= 2016–17 FC Arsenal Tula season =

FC Arsenal Tula
2016–17 season
- Chairman: Guram Adzhoyev
- Manager: Sergei Kiriakov
- Stadium: Arsenal Stadium
- Russian Premier League: 14th
- Relegation play-offs: vs Yenisey Krasnoyarsk
- Russian Cup: Round of 32 vs Tosno
- Top goalscorer: League: Federico Rasic (6); All: Federico Rasic (6)
Home colours	Away colours	Third colours

The 2016–17 FC Arsenal Tula season is the club's first season back in the Russian Premier League, the highest tier of association football in Russia, since relegation at the end of the 2014–15 season, and their 2nd in total. Arsenal Tula also reached the Russian Cup Round of 32, where they were eliminated by Tosno.

== Squad ==
As of 28 February 2017

Note: Flags indicate national team as defined under FIFA eligibility rules; some limited exceptions apply. Players may hold more than one non-FIFA nationality.

No.	Pos.	Nation	Player
2	DF	RUS	Ivan Yershov
5	DF	RUS	Anri Khagush
6	DF	RUS	Maksim Belyayev
7	MF	RUS	Kantemir Berkhamov
9	DF	RUS	Kirill Kombarov
13	DF	ZAM	Stoppila Sunzu
18	MF	RUS	Nikita Burmistrov
19	FW	ARG	Federico Rasic
20	MF	RUS	Vadim Steklov
21	DF	COL	Jherson Vergara
25	GK	RUS	Vladimir Gabulov

No.	Pos.	Nation	Player
26	MF	MLI	Moussa Doumbia (loan from Rostov)
28	MF	RUS	Vladislav Ryzhkov
36	GK	RUS	Mikhail Levashov
61	DF	GEO	Gia Grigalava
62	MF	ROU	Alexandru Bourceanu
71	DF	RUS	Aleksandr Denisov
78	MF	RUS	Ilya Maksimov
84	MF	RUS	Oleg Vlasov
86	DF	BUL	Ivan Ivanov
88	FW	RUS	Igor Shevchenko
98	MF	BUL	Mihail Aleksandrov

=== On Loan ===
Note: Flags indicate national team as defined under FIFA eligibility rules; some limited exceptions apply. Players may hold more than one non-FIFA nationality.

No.	Pos.	Nation	Player
10	FW	CRC	Felicio Brown (at Anzhi Makhachkala)

=== Reserve squad ===
Reserve team players are registered with the Premier League and are eligible to play in any official games.

Note: Flags indicate national team as defined under FIFA eligibility rules; some limited exceptions apply. Players may hold more than one non-FIFA nationality.

No.	Pos.	Nation	Player
17	FW	RUS	Guram Adzhoyev
30	FW	RUS	Dzhamshed Maksumov
31	GK	RUS	Aleksei Berezin
33	MF	RUS	Igor Veprikov
34	DF	RUS	Aleksandr Osipov
35	GK	RUS	Nikita Makeyev
38	DF	RUS	Rustam Normatov
40	DF	RUS	Pavel Borisov
41	DF	RUS	Dmitri Doronin
44	FW	RUS	Roman Izotov
45	FW	RUS	Arkadi Lobzin
47	DF	RUS	Andrius Rukas
48	MF	RUS	Roman Pekulov
49	MF	RUS	Nikita Golub
50	GK	RUS	Aleksandr Puchkov
51	GK	RUS	Vitali Ushakov
52	DF	RUS	Ilya Klementyev
57	MF	RUS	Artyom Mingazov
58	MF	RUS	Yaroslav Ivakin

No.	Pos.	Nation	Player
59	MF	RUS	Kirill Chernov
60	MF	RUS	Andrei Potapov
65	MF	RUS	Ilya Savkin
66	DF	RUS	Yevgeni Yezhov
69	FW	RUS	Sergei Stepanov
70	FW	RUS	Valeri Alshanskiy
72	FW	RUS	Aleksandr Zharinov
74	DF	RUS	Ilya Salnikov
75	DF	RUS	Stepan Rebenko
80	MF	RUS	Aleksandr Gordiyenko
82	GK	RUS	Vladislav Suslov
85	GK	RUS	Maksim Staroverov
87	MF	RUS	Aleksandr Kotenko
92	MF	RUS	Aleksei Kiselyov
94	DF	RUS	Aleksandr Matrenov
95	DF	RUS	Artur Farion
96	DF	RUS	Yanis Linda
97	FW	RUS	Vladislav Kormishin

== Transfers ==
=== Summer ===
In: Note: Flags indicate national team as defined under FIFA eligibility rules; some limited exceptions apply. Players may hold more than one non-FIFA nationality.

No.	Pos.	Nation	Player
1	GK	RUS	Roman Gerus (from (Russia) Amkar Perm)
8	MF	RUS	Aleksandr Sheshukov (from (Russia) Lokomotiv Moscow)
11	FW	RUS	Khyzyr Appayev (from (Russia) Orenburg)
16	MF	GHA	Emmanuel Frimpong
17	MF	RUS	Ernest Lukiv (from (Russia) Yenisey Krasnoyarsk)
18	MF	RUS	Nikita Burmistrov (from (Russia) Krasnodar)
22	DF	SVK	Lukáš Tesák (from (Kazakhstan) Kairat)
21	DF	COL	Jherson Vergara (on loan from (Italy) Milan)
23	FW	RUS	Ruslan Mukhametshin (from (Russia) Mordovia Saransk)
29	DF	RUS	Aleksandr Gorbatyuk (from (Russia) Sokol Saratov)
30	FW	RUS	Dzhamshed Maksumov (from (Tajikistan) Istiklol)
33	MF	RUS	Igor Veprikov
34	MF	RUS	Oleg Vlasov (from (Russia) Mordovia Saransk)
34	DF	RUS	Aleksandr Osipov (from (Russia) UOR #5 Yegoryevsk)
35	GK	RUS	Nikita Makeyev (from (Russia) Oryol)
36	GK	RUS	Mikhail Levashov (from (Russia) Arsenal-2 Tula)
37	DF	RUS	Pavel Kaloshin (from (Russia) Khimki-M)
38	DF	RUS	Rustam Normatov (from (Russia) Arsenal-2 Tula)
39	MF	RUS	Igor Gorbatenko (from (Russia) Krylia Sovetov Samara, previously on loan)
40	DF	RUS	Pavel Borisov (from (Russia) Arsenal-2 Tula)
41	DF	RUS	Dmitri Doronin (from (Russia) UOR #5 Yegoryevsk)
44	FW	RUS	Roman Izotov (from (Russia) Arsenal-2 Tula)
45	FW	RUS	Arkadi Lobzin (from (Russia) Arsenal-2 Tula)
47	DF	RUS	Andrius Rukas
48	MF	RUS	Roman Pekulov
49	MF	RUS	Nikita Golub
50	GK	RUS	Aleksandr Puchkov (from (Russia) Arsenal-2 Tula)
51	GK	RUS	Vitali Ushakov (from (Russia) UOR #5 Yegoryevsk)
52	DF	RUS	Ilya Klementyev (from (Russia) UOR #5 Yegoryevsk)
55	MF	RUS	Vladimir Mikhaylov (from (Russia) Arsenal-2 Tula)
57	MF	RUS	Artyom Mingazov (from (Russia) Arsenal-2 Tula)
58	MF	RUS	Yaroslav Ivakin (from (Russia) UOR #5 Yegoryevsk)
59	MF	RUS	Kirill Chernov
60	MF	RUS	Andrei Potapov (from (Russia) UOR #5 Yegoryevsk)
63	MF	RUS	Vladimir Pestryachyov
65	MF	RUS	Ilya Savkin
66	DF	RUS	Yevgeni Yezhov (from (Russia) Torpedo Moscow)
69	FW	RUS	Sergei Stepanov
70	FW	RUS	Valeri Alshanskiy (from (Russia) Arsenal-2 Tula)
72	FW	RUS	Aleksandr Zharinov
74	DF	RUS	Ilya Salnikov (from (Russia) Aventa-2000 Moscow)
78	MF	RUS	Ilya Maksimov (from (Russia) Anzhi Makhachkala)
80	MF	RUS	Stepan Rebenko (from (Russia) Zenit St. Petersburg)
80	MF	RUS	Aleksandr Gordiyenko
81	MF	RUS	Dmitri Shilov (from (Russia) Arsenal-2 Tula)
82	GK	RUS	Vladislav Suslov (from (Russia) Rostov)
85	GK	RUS	Maksim Staroverov (from (Russia) Arsenal-2 Tula)
87	MF	RUS	Aleksandr Kotenko (from (Russia) Arsenal-2 Tula)
89	MF	RUS	Sergei Shapovalov (from (Russia) Dynamo Kirov)
90	MF	RUS	Nikolai Izvekov (from (Russia) Arsenal-2 Tula)
92	MF	RUS	Aleksei Kiselyov (from (Armenia) Mika)
94	DF	RUS	Aleksandr Matrenov (from (Russia) Arsenal-2 Tula)
95	DF	RUS	Artur Farion (from (Russia) Arsenal-2 Tula)
96	DF	RUS	Yanis Linda (from (Russia) Lokomotiv Liski)
97	FW	RUS	Vladislav Kormishin (from (Russia) Sibir-2 Novosibirsk)

Out: Note: Flags indicate national team as defined under FIFA eligibility rules; some limited exceptions apply. Players may hold more than one non-FIFA nationality.

No.	Pos.	Nation	Player
9	FW	MNE	Goran Vujović (to (Montenegro) Budućnost Podgorica)
10	MF	UKR	Vitaliy Fedotov
11	MF	RUS	Aleksei Bazanov (to (Russia) Tekstilshchik Ivanovo)
15	DF	RUS	Aleksandr Stolyarenko (on loan to (Russia) Tambov, previously from (Russia) Sokol Saratov)
16	GK	RUS	Sergei Kotov
19	MF	RUS	Artyom Dudolev (to (Russia) Sokol Saratov)
21	MF	RUS	Maksim Mashnev (on loan to (Russia) Luch-Energiya Vladivostok)
27	MF	RUS	Sergei Ignatyev (on loan to (Russia) Sochi)
33	GK	RUS	Igor Kot (to (Russia) Mordovia Saransk)
54	FW	RUS	Aleksandr Zakarlyuka (to (Russia) Zenit Penza)
—	MF	RUS	Pavel Deobald (to (Russia) Mordovia Saransk, previously on loan to (Russia) Torpedo Armavir)

=== Winter ===
In: Note: Flags indicate national team as defined under FIFA eligibility rules; some limited exceptions apply. Players may hold more than one non-FIFA nationality.

No.	Pos.	Nation	Player
9	DF	RUS	Kirill Kombarov (from (Russia) Tom Tomsk)
13	DF	ZAM	Stoppila Sunzu (on loan from (China) Shanghai Shenhua)
19	FW	ARG	Federico Rasic (from (Argentina) Gimnasia y Esgrima)
25	GK	RUS	Vladimir Gabulov (free agent)
26	MF	MLI	Moussa Doumbia (on loan from (Russia) Rostov)
43	DF	RUS	Konstantin Markin
53	FW	RUS	Aslanbek Sikoyev
54	MF	RUS	Daniil Zuyev
56	DF	RUS	Boris Samoylov
61	DF	GEO	Gia Grigalava (from (Cyprus) Ethnikos Achna)
62	MF	ROU	Alexandru Bourceanu (from (Romania) Steaua București)
67	DF	RUS	Aleksandr Tsogoyev
68	DF	RUS	Nikita Melnikov (from (Russia) LFK Lokomotiv Moscow)
79	MF	RUS	Danila Buranov (from (Belarus) Belshina Bobruisk)
83	DF	RUS	Kirill Merkotan
86	DF	BUL	Ivan Ivanov (from (Greece) Panathinaikos)
98	MF	BUL	Mihail Aleksandrov (from (Poland) Legia Warsaw)

Out: Note: Flags indicate national team as defined under FIFA eligibility rules; some limited exceptions apply. Players may hold more than one non-FIFA nationality.

No.	Pos.	Nation	Player
1	GK	RUS	Roman Gerus
3	DF	RUS	Igor Kaleshin (to (Russia) Sochi)
4	DF	RUS	Dmitry Aydov
8	MF	RUS	Aleksandr Sheshukov (to (Russia) Baltika Kaliningrad)
10	FW	CRC	Felicio Brown Forbes (on loan to (Russia) Anzhi Makhachkala)
11	FW	RUS	Khyzyr Appayev
14	FW	RUS	Sergey Maslov
16	MF	GHA	Emmanuel Frimpong (to (Sweden) AFC Eskilstuna)
22	DF	SVK	Lukáš Tesák
23	FW	RUS	Ruslan Mukhametshin (to (Kazakhstan) Taraz)
24	MF	RUS	Dmitri Smirnov
29	DF	RUS	Aleksandr Gorbatyuk (to (Russia) Tambov)
32	MF	RUS	Andrei Gorbanets
37	DF	RUS	Pavel Kaloshin (to (Russia) FSC Dolgoprudny-2)
55	MF	RUS	Vladimir Mikhaylov
63	MF	RUS	Vladimir Pestryachyov
64	MF	RUS	Ernest Lukiv
73	MF	RUS	Renat Gagity
77	GK	RUS	Aleksandr Filtsov (end of loan from (Russia) Rubin Kazan)
81	MF	RUS	Dmitri Shilov
89	MF	RUS	Sergei Shapovalov
90	MF	RUS	Nikolai Izvekov
93	GK	RUS	Aleksei Skornyakov (to (Russia) Torpedo Moscow)

== Competitions ==
=== Russian Premier League ===
==== Results by round ====
Round	1	2	3	4	5	6	7	8	9	10	11	12	13	14	15	16	17	18	19	20	21	22	23	24	25	26	27	28	29	30
Ground	A	H	A	H	A	H	A	H	A	H	A	H	A	H	A	A	H	A	H	A	H	A	H	A	H	A	H	A	H	H
Result	L	W	L	D	D	L	L	D	D	D	D	L	L	L	L	L	W	L	W	L	W	L	L	L	W	L	W	L	D	W
Position	16	8	11	10	10	12	13	14	14	14	13	14	14	15	16	16	15	15	14	15	13	13	15	15	14	15	15	15	15	14

Updated to match(es) played on 21 May 2017. Source: See Results
A = Away; H = Home; W = Win; D = Draw; L = Loss

==== Matches ====
31 July 2016 1	Spartak Moscow	4–0	Arsenal Tula	Moscow
18:00 MSK (UTC+3)	Jano 6', 34'; Promes 47', 90+2'; Zuyev (yellow card) 74'	Summary		Stadium: Otkrytiye Arena; Attendance: 28,052; Referee: Kirill Levnikov

6 August 2016 2	Arsenal Tula	1–0	Rubin Kazan	Tula
19:30 MSK (UTC+3)	Shevchenko 21' (yellow card) 76'	Summary	Sánchez (yellow card) 39'; Burlak (yellow card) 88'; Dević (yellow card) 90+4'	Stadium: Arsenal Stadium; Attendance: 11,500; Referee: Evgeny Turbin

14 August 2016 3	Anzhi Makhachkala	1–0	Arsenal Tula	Kaspiysk
20:00 MSK (UTC+3)	Yambéré (yellow card) 15'; Ebecilio (yellow card) 29'; Mayewski 45+2'; Berisha (yellow card) 82'; Budkivskyi (yellow card) 90'; Gadzhibekov (yellow card) 90+1'	Summary	Belyayev (yellow card) 58'; Denisov (yellow card) 79'	Stadium: Anzhi Arena; Attendance: 7,300; Referee: Aleksei Matyunin

22 August 2016 3	Arsenal Tula	0–0	Orenburg	Tula
19:30 MSK (UTC+3)	Brown (yellow card) 44'; Shevchenko (yellow card) 62'	Summary	Pomerko (yellow card) 34'; Malykh (yellow card) 50' (yellow-red card) 68'; Vorobyov (yellow card) 56'	Stadium: Arsenal Stadium; Attendance: 10,900; Referee: Mikhail Vilkov

28 August 2016 5	Ural Yekaterinburg	1–1	Arsenal Tula	Yekaterinburg
17:00 MSK (UTC+3)	Lungu 87'	Summary	Vlasov 48'; Denisov (yellow card) 57'; Gorbanets (yellow card) 85'; Filtsov (yellow card) 90+5'	Stadium: SKB-Bank Arena; Attendance: 6,556; Referee: Roman Galimov

11 September 2016 6	Arsenal Tula	0–5	Zenit St.Petersburg	Tula
19:00 MSK (UTC+3)		Summary	Kokorin 18'; Dzyuba 38'; Mak 66'; Giuliano 84'; Kerzhakov 89' (pen.)	Stadium: Arsenal Stadium; Attendance: 18,200; Referee: Aleksandr Egorov

17 September 2016 7	Tom Tomsk	1–0	Arsenal Tula	Tomsk
14:00 MSK (UTC+3)	Dyakov 25'	Summary	Aydov (yellow card) 55'; Gorbatyuk (yellow card) 56'; Berkhamov (yellow card) 68'	Stadium: Trud Stadium; Attendance: 4,250; Referee: Igor Fedotov

25 September 2016 8	Arsenal Tula	0–0	Terek Grozny	Tula
14:30 MSK (UTC+3)	Gorbatyuk (yellow card) 24'; Berkhamov (yellow card) 77'; Denisov (yellow card) 84'; Ryzhkov (yellow card) 90+1'	Summary	Pliyev (yellow card) 66'; Píriz (yellow card) 77'	Stadium: Arsenal Stadium; Attendance: 6,800; Referee: Vladislav Bezborodov

1 October 2016 9	Lokomotiv Moscow	1–1	Arsenal Tula	Moscow
17:00 MSK (UTC+3)	Barinov (yellow card) 67'; Samedov 90+1' (pen.)	Summary	Brown Forbes 44'; Tesák (yellow card) 72'; Gorbatyuk (yellow card) 90'	Stadium: Lokomotiv Stadium; Attendance: 8,743; Referee: Vladimir Seldyakov

16 October 2016 10	Arsenal Tula	0–0	Krasnodar	Tula
19:00 MSK (UTC+3)	Steklov (yellow card) 71'	Summary	Martynovich (yellow card) 80'	Stadium: Arsenal Stadium; Attendance: 7,500; Referee: Aleksei Eskov

21 October 2016 11	Krylia Sovetov	1–1	Arsenal Tula	Samara
18:00 MSK (UTC+3)	Mollo 36' (pen.); Bashkirov (red card) 43'; Nadson (yellow card) 65'; Kornilenko (yellow card) 74'	Summary	Brown 44' (pen.); Vergara (yellow card) 66'	Stadium: Metallurg Stadium; Attendance: 4,678; Referee: Vitali Meshkov

30 October 2016 12	Arsenal Tula	0–2	Ufa	Tula
13:30 MSK (UTC+3)	Vergara (yellow card) 50'; Khagush (yellow card) 52'	Summary	Igboun (yellow card) 7' (goal) 45+1'; Nikitin (yellow card) 25'; Zaseyev (yellow card) 52'; Bezdenezhnykh (yellow card) 64'; Fatai 80'	Stadium: Arsenal Stadium; Attendance: 7,050; Referee: Alexander Yegorov

6 November 2016 13	Rostov	4–1	Arsenal Tula	Rostov-on-Don
17:00 MSK (UTC+3)	Yerokhin 26', 90'; Azmoun 36'; Gațcan (yellow card) 70'; Poloz 85'	Summary	Burmistrov 8'; Belyayev (yellow card) 90+3'	Stadium: Olimp-2; Attendance: 8,400; Referee: Kirill Levnikov

18 November 2016 14	Arsenal Tula	0–1	CSKA Moscow	Tula
19:00 MSK (UTC+3)	Khagush (yellow card) 80'; Gorbatenko (yellow card) 82'	Summary	Milanov 20'; Shchennikov (yellow card) 90+3'	Stadium: Arsenal Stadium; Attendance: 16,100; Referee: Vladislav Bezborodov

26 November 2016 15	Amkar Perm	1–0	Arsenal Tula	Perm
11:30 MSK (UTC+3)	Prokofyev 7'	Summary	Maksimov (yellow card) 58'; Burmistrov (yellow card) 65'; Steklov (yellow card) 90+4'	Stadium: Zvezda Stadium; Attendance: 4,150; Referee: Evgeny Turbin

30 November 2016 16	Rubin Kazan	1–0	Arsenal Tula	Kazan
19:00 MSK (UTC+3)	Jonathas 62'; Ryzhikov (yellow card) 89'	Summary	Khagush (yellow card) 32'	Stadium: Kazan Arena; Attendance: 3,289; Referee: Vladimir Moskalyov

5 December 2016 17	Arsenal Tula	1–0	Anzhi Makhachkala	Tula
19:30 MSK (UTC+3)	Berkhamov (yellow card) 34'; Belyayev 70'; Levashov (yellow card) 90+2'	Summary	Budkivskyi (yellow card) 17'; Ebecilio (yellow card) 42'	Stadium: Arsenal Stadium; Attendance: 4,597; Referee: Aleksei Eskov

4 March 2017 18	Orenburg	3–0	Arsenal Tula	Orenburg
14:00 MSK (UTC+3)	Georgiev 3', 21' (pen.); Grigoryev (yellow card) 12'; Vorobyov 50'; Poluyakhtov (yellow card) 74'	Summary	Gorbatenko (yellow card) 36'; Burmistrov (yellow card) 70'	Stadium: Gazovik Stadium; Attendance: 4,232; Referee: Vladimir Seldyakov

10 March 2017 19	Arsenal Tula	2–0	Ural Yekaterinburg	Tula
19:00 MSK (UTC+3)	Doumbia (yellow card) 3'; Rasic 19' (pen.), 62' (yellow card) 42'; Burmistrov (yellow card) 76'	Summary	Fidler (yellow card) 52'; Balažic (yellow card) 61' (yellow-red card) 65'	Stadium: Arsenal Stadium; Attendance: 10,200; Referee: Sergey Lapochkin

19 March 2017 20	Zenit St.Petersburg	2–0	Arsenal Tula	Saint Petersburg
19:30 MSK (UTC+3)	Kokorin (yellow card) 36'; Criscito 51' (pen.); Danny 53'; Hernani (yellow card) 61'	Summary	Gabulov (yellow card) 53'	Stadium: Petrovsky Stadium; Attendance: 16,903; Referee: Aleksey Eskov

1 April 2017 21	Arsenal Tula	3–0	Tom Tomsk	Tula
19:00 MSK (UTC+3)	Aleksandrov 19'; Doumbia (yellow card) 62' (goal) 74'; Bourceanu (yellow card) 83'; Kombarov 89'; Adzhoyev (yellow card) 90+1'	Summary	Osipov (yellow card) 23'; Sasin (yellow card) 31'; Balyaikin (yellow card) 73'; Karymov (yellow card) 80'	Stadium: Arsenal Stadium; Attendance: 10,100; Referee: Vladimir Moskalyov

8 April 2017 22	Terek Grozny	3–1	Arsenal Tula	Grozny
16:30 MSK (UTC+3)	Mitrishev 5', 20'; Gyömbér (yellow card) 76'; Berisha 90+1'	Summary	Doumbia (yellow card) 57'; Bourceanu (yellow card) 66'; Rasic 77' (pen.)	Stadium: Akhmat-Arena; Attendance: 18,735; Referee: Kirill Levnikov

16 April 2017 23	Arsenal Tula	0–3	Lokomotiv Moscow	Tula
17:30 MSK (UTC+3)	Vergara (yellow card) 9'; Rasic (yellow card) 34' (yellow-red card) 37'; Shevchenko (yellow card) 90+1'	Summary	Denisov (yellow card) 38'; Fernandes 53'; Maicon 74' (pen.); Ari 75'; Denisov (yellow card) 75'; Miranchuk (yellow card) 81'	Stadium: Arsenal Stadium; Attendance: 12,430; Referee: Sergey Lapochkin

23 April 2017 24	Krasnodar	2–0	Arsenal Tula	Krasnodar
17:00 MSK (UTC+3)	Kaboré 49'; Smolov 84'	Summary	Maksimov (yellow card) 24'; Vergara (yellow card) 82'	Stadium: Krasnodar Stadium; Attendance: 16,214; Referee: Aleksei Matyunin

26 April 2017 25	Arsenal Tula	2–0	Krylia Sovetov	Tula
19:30 MSK (UTC+3)	Belyayev (yellow card) 14'; Grigalava 31'; Bourceanu (yellow card) 60'; Rasic 80'	Summary	Taranov (yellow card) 18'; Mijailović (yellow card) 44'; Zotov (yellow card) 59'	Stadium: Arsenal Stadium; Attendance: 11,730; Referee: Aleksandr Egorov

30 April 2017 26	Ufa	1–0	Arsenal Tula	Ufa
14:30 MSK (UTC+3)	Alikin (yellow card) 28'; Sukhov 90+3'	Summary	Vergara (yellow card) 88'	Stadium: Neftyanik Stadium; Attendance: 5,862; Referee: Evgeny Turbin

6 May 2017 27	Arsenal Tula	1–0	Rostov	Tula
16:30 MSK (UTC+3)	Rasic (yellow card) 16'; Burmistrov 37'; Doumbia (yellow card) 70'; Gabulov (yellow card) 90+1'	Summary	Bayramyan (yellow card) 20'	Stadium: Arsenal Stadium; Attendance: 10,100; Referee: Alexey Nikolaev

12 May 2017 28	CSKA Moscow	3–0	Arsenal Tula	Moscow
19:30 MSK (UTC+3)	Natcho 31' (pen.); Chalov 41', 53'; Kuchayev (yellow card) 90+2'	Report	Sunzu (yellow card) 29'; Kombarov (yellow card) 88'	Stadium: VEB Arena; Attendance: 10,791; Referee: Vladimir Seldyakov

17 May 2017 29	Arsenal Tula	0–0	Amkar Perm	Tula
19:30 MSK (UTC+3)	Grigalava (yellow card) 89'	Report	Miljković (yellow card) 72'; Kostyukov (yellow card) 77'	Stadium: Arsenal Stadium; Attendance: 8,100; Referee: Vladimir Moskalyov

21 May 2017 30	Arsenal Tula	3–0	Spartak Moscow	Tula
15:00 MSK (UTC+3)	Rasic 3', 63'; Maksimov 24'	Report	Dzhikiya (red card) 12'	Stadium: Arsenal Stadium; Attendance: 18,500; Referee: Aleksandr Egorov

==== League table ====
Pos	Team	Pld	W	D	L	GF	GA	GD	Pts	Qualification or relegation
12	Anzhi Makhachkala	30	7	9	14	24	38	−14	30 (Note: Anzhi Makhachkala ahead of Orenburg on head-to-head points; Orenburg–Anzhi Makhachkala 0–0, Anzhi Makhachkala–Orenburg 1–0.)	
13	Orenburg (R)	30	7	9	14	25	36	−11	30	Qualification for the Relegation play-offs
14	Arsenal Tula (O)	30	7	7	16	18	40	−22	28	Qualification for the Relegation play-offs
15	Krylia Sovetov Samara (R)	30	6	10	14	31	39	−8	28	Relegation to Football National League
16	Tom Tomsk (R)	30	3	5	22	17	64	−47	14	Relegation to Football National League

Source: Russian Premier League, Soccerway
Rules for classification: 1) Points; 2) Matches won; 3) Head-to-head points; 4) Head-to-head matches won; 5) Head-to-head goal difference; 6) Head-to-head goals scored; 7) Head-to-head away goals; 8) Goal difference; 9) Goals scored; 10) Away goals scored.
(O) Play-off winners; (R) Relegated

==== Relegation play-offs ====
25 May 2016 1st Leg	Yenisey Krasnoyarsk	2 – 1	Arsenal Tula	Krasnoyarsk
19:30 MSK (UTC+3)	Aleksandrov 11' (o.g.); Chicherin (yellow card) 31'; Maloyan 90'	Report	Grigalava (yellow card) 38'; Doumbia (yellow card) 65'; Kombarov 72'	Stadium: Central Stadium; Referee: Vladislav Bezborodov

27 May 2016 2nd Leg	Arsenal Tula	– (– agg.)	Yenisey Krasnoyarsk	Tula
MSK (UTC+3)				Stadium: Arsenal Stadium

=== Russian Cup ===
21 September 2016 Round of 32	Tosno	2–0	Arsenal Tula	Veliky Novgorod
18:30 MSK (UTC+3)	Paliyenko 10'; Abazov 86'	Summary	Steklov (yellow card) 70'	Stadium: Elektron Stadium; Attendance: 2,400; Referee: Pavel Kukuyan

== Squad statistics ==
As of Match played 25 May 2017

=== Appearances and goals ===
No.	Pos	Nat	Player	Total		Premier League		Russian Cup		playoffs	
No.	Pos	Nat	Player	Apps	Goals	Apps	Goals	Apps	Goals	Apps	Goals
2	DF	(Russia) RUS	Ivan Yershov	6	0	5	0	1	0	0	0
5	DF	(Russia) RUS	Anri Khagush	12	0	9+2	0	1	0	0	0
6	DF	(Russia) RUS	Maksim Belyayev	29	1	26+1	1	1	0	1	0
7	MF	(Russia) RUS	Kantemir Berkhamov	13	0	10+1	0	1	0	1	0
9	DF	(Russia) RUS	Kirill Kombarov	13	2	12	1	0	0	1	1
13	DF	(Zambia) ZAM	Stoppila Sunzu	14	0	13	0	0	0	1	0
17	FW	(Russia) RUS	Guram Adzhoyev	1	0	0+1	0	0	0	0	0
18	FW	(Russia) RUS	Nikita Burmistrov	20	2	19+1	2	0	0	0	0
19	FW	(Argentina) ARG	Federico Rasic	12	6	8+4	6	0	0	0	0
20	MF	(Russia) RUS	Vadim Steklov	20	0	17+2	0	1	0	0	0
21	DF	(Colombia) COL	Jherson Vergara	18	0	17+1	0	0	0	0	0
22	DF	(Slovakia) SVK	Lukáš Tesák	12	0	12	0	0	0	0	0
25	GK	(Russia) RUS	Vladimir Gabulov	14	0	13	0	0	0	1	0
26	MF	(Mali) MLI	Moussa Doumbia	13	1	11+1	1	0	0	1	0
28	MF	(Russia) RUS	Vladislav Ryzhkov	10	0	3+6	0	0+1	0	0	0
36	GK	(Russia) RUS	Mikhail Levashov	13	0	11+1	0	1	0	0	0
39	MF	(Russia) RUS	Igor Gorbatenko	25	0	15+8	0	1	0	0+1	0
61	DF	(Georgia (country)) GEO	Gia Grigalava	5	1	3+1	1	0	0	1	0
62	MF	(Romania) ROU	Alexandru Bourceanu	14	0	13	0	0	0	1	0
71	DF	(Russia) RUS	Aleksandr Denisov	11	0	8+2	0	1	0	0	0
78	MF	(Russia) RUS	Ilya Maksimov	14	1	12+1	1	0	0	1	0
79	MF	(Russia) RUS	Danila Buranov	2	0	0+2	0	0	0	0	0
84	MF	(Russia) RUS	Oleg Vlasov	20	1	8+12	1	0	0	0	0
86	DF	(Bulgaria) BUL	Ivan Ivanov	6	0	5+1	0	0	0	0	0
88	FW	(Russia) RUS	Igor Shevchenko	18	1	10+7	1	0	0	1	0
98	MF	(Bulgaria) BUL	Mihail Aleksandrov	14	1	13	1	0	0	1	0
Players away from the club on loan:
10	FW	(Costa Rica) CRC	Felicio Brown	14	2	14	2	0	0	0	0
Players who left Arsenal Tula during the season:
1	GK	(Russia) RUS	Roman Gerus	3	0	3	0	0	0	0	0
4	DF	(Russia) RUS	Dmitry Aydov	4	0	2+1	0	1	0	0	0
8	MF	(Russia) RUS	Aleksandr Sheshukov	8	0	7+1	0	0	0	0	0
11	FW	(Russia) RUS	Khyzyr Appayev	14	0	3+10	0	1	0	0	0
16	MF	(Ghana) GHA	Emmanuel Frimpong	4	0	1+2	0	1	0	0	0
23	FW	(Russia) RUS	Ruslan Mukhametshin	11	0	5+5	0	0+1	0	0	0
24	MF	(Russia) RUS	Dmitry Smirnov	2	0	0+2	0	0	0	0	0
29	DF	(Russia) RUS	Aleksandr Gorbatyuk	17	0	16	0	0+1	0	0	0
32	MF	(Russia) RUS	Andrei Gorbanets	5	0	3+2	0	0	0	0	0
77	GK	(Russia) RUS	Aleksandr Filtsov	3	0	3	0	0	0	0	0

=== Goal scorers ===
Place	Position	Nation	Number	Name	Premier League	Russian Cup	Playoffs	Total
1	FW	(Argentina)	19	Federico Rasic	6	0	0	6
2	FW	(Costa Rica)	10	Felicio Brown	2	0	0	2
2	FW	(Russia)	18	Nikita Burmistrov	2	0	0	2
2	DF	(Russia)	9	Kirill Kombarov	1	0	1	2
5	FW	(Russia)	63	Igor Shevchenko	1	0	0	1
5	DF	(Russia)	6	Maksim Belyayev	1	0	0	1
5	MF	(Russia)	34	Oleg Vlasov	1	0	0	1
5	FW	(Bulgaria)	98	Mihail Aleksandrov	1	0	0	1
5	MF	(Mali)	26	Moussa Doumbia	1	0	0	1
5	DF	(Georgia (country))	61	Gia Grigalava	1	0	0	1
5	MF	(Russia)	78	Ilya Maksimov	1	0	0	1
				TOTALS	18	0	0	18

=== Disciplinary record ===
Number	Nation	Position	Name	Premier League		Russian Cup		Playoffs		Total	
Number	Nation	Position	Name	Yellow card	Red card	Yellow card	Red card	Yellow card	Red card	Yellow card	Red card
1	(Russia)	GK	Roman Gerus	1	0	0	0	0	0	1	0
4	(Russia)	DF	Dmitry Aydov	1	0	0	0	0	0	1	0
5	(Russia)	DF	Anri Khagush	3	0	0	0	0	0	3	0
6	(Russia)	DF	Maksim Belyayev	3	0	0	0	0	0	3	0
7	(Russia)	MF	Kantemir Berkhamov	3	0	0	0	0	0	3	0
9	(Russia)	DF	Kirill Kombarov	1	0	0	0	0	0	1	0
10	(Costa Rica)	FW	Felicio Brown	1	0	0	0	0	0	1	0
13	(Zambia)	DF	Stoppila Sunzu	1	0	0	0	0	0	1	0
17	(Russia)	FW	Guram Adzhoyev	1	0	0	0	0	0	1	0
18	(Russia)	FW	Nikita Burmistrov	3	0	0	0	0	0	3	0
19	(Argentina)	FW	Federico Rasic	4	1	0	0	0	0	4	1
20	(Russia)	MF	Vadim Steklov	2	0	1	0	0	0	3	0
21	(Colombia)	DF	Jherson Vergara	5	0	0	0	0	0	5	0
22	(Slovakia)	DF	Lukáš Tesák	1	0	0	0	0	0	1	0
25	(Russia)	GK	Vladimir Gabulov	2	0	0	0	0	0	2	0
26	(Mali)	MF	Moussa Doumbia	4	0	0	0	1	0	5	0
28	(Russia)	MF	Vladislav Ryzhkov	1	0	0	0	0	0	1	0
29	(Russia)	DF	Aleksandr Gorbatyuk	3	0	0	0	0	0	3	0
32	(Russia)	MF	Andrei Gorbanets	1	0	0	0	0	0	1	0
36	(Russia)	GK	Mikhail Levashov	1	0	0	0	0	0	1	0
39	(Russia)	MF	Igor Gorbatenko	2	0	0	0	0	0	2	0
61	(Georgia (country))	DF	Gia Grigalava	1	0	0	0	1	0	2	0
62	(Romania)	MF	Alexandru Bourceanu	3	0	0	0	0	0	3	0
63	(Russia)	FW	Igor Shevchenko	2	0	0	0	0	0	2	0
71	(Russia)	DF	Aleksandr Denisov	3	0	0	0	0	0	3	0
77	(Russia)	GK	Aleksandr Filtsov	1	0	0	0	0	0	1	0
78	(Russia)	MF	Ilya Maksimov	2	0	0	0	0	0	2	0
88	(Russia)	FW	Igor Shevchenko	1	0	0	0	0	0	1	0
			TOTALS	57	1	1	0	2	0	60	1
