= 2017–18 FC Arsenal Tula season =

Arsenal Tula
2017–18 season
- Chairman: Guram Adzhoyev
- Manager: Miodrag Božović
- Stadium: Arsenal Stadium
- Russian Premier League: 7th
- Russian Cup: Round of 32 vs Tambov
- Top goalscorer: League: Luka Đorđević (7); All: Luka Đorđević (7)
Home colours

The 2017–18 FC Arsenal Tula season was the club's second season back in the Russian Premier League, the highest tier of association football in Russia, since relegation at the end of the 2014–15 season, and their third in total. They finished the season in seventh position and were knocked out of the Russian Cup by FC Tambov at the Round of 32 stage.

== Squad ==
As of 28 February 2018

Note: Flags indicate national team as defined under FIFA eligibility rules; some limited exceptions apply. Players may hold more than one non-FIFA nationality.

No.	Pos.	Nation	Player
1	GK	RUS	Igor Obukhov (on loan from Zenit St. Petersburg)
6	DF	RUS	Maksim Belyayev
7	MF	RUS	Kantemir Berkhamov
8	DF	GEO	Gia Grigalava
9	DF	RUS	Kirill Kombarov
10	FW	ZAM	Evans Kangwa
11	MF	RUS	Sergei Tkachyov (on loan from CSKA Moscow)
13	DF	ZAM	Stoppila Sunzu (on loan from Lille)
14	DF	RUS	Anri Khagush
15	MF	CIV	Habib Maïga (on loan from Saint-Étienne)
17	FW	RUS	Guram Adzhoyev
18	FW	MNE	Luka Đorđević (on loan from Zenit St. Petersburg)
19	FW	ARG	Federico Rasic

No.	Pos.	Nation	Player
20	MF	SRB	Goran Čaušić
21	DF	ESP	Víctor Álvarez
23	MF	RUS	Igor Gorbatenko
24	FW	RUS	Artem Dzyuba (on loan from Zenit St. Petersburg)
33	FW	RUS	Aslanbek Sikoyev
36	GK	RUS	Mikhail Levashov
52	DF	RUS	Ivan Novoseltsev (on loan from Zenit St. Petersburg)
55	MF	ROU	Alexandru Bourceanu
71	DF	RUS	Aleksandr Denisov
77	MF	BUL	Mihail Aleksandrov
80	MF	RUS	Yaroslav Ivakin
87	MF	RUS	Ilya Maksimov
88	FW	RUS	Igor Shevchenko

=== Out on loan ===
Note: Flags indicate national team as defined under FIFA eligibility rules; some limited exceptions apply. Players may hold more than one non-FIFA nationality.

No.	Pos.	Nation	Player
—	DF	RUS	Dmitry Aydov (on loan to Gomel)
—	DF	RUS	Aleksandr Stolyarenko (on loan to Rotor Volgograd)
—	MF	RUS	Maksim Mashnev (on loan to Luch-Energiya Vladivostok)

No.	Pos.	Nation	Player
—	MF	RUS	Artyom Mingazov (on loan to Khimik Novomoskovsk)
—	MF	RUS	Vladislav Ryzhkov (on loan to Tambov)
—	FW	RUS	Roman Izotov (on loan to Torpedo Moscow)

== Transfers ==
=== Summer ===
In: Note: Flags indicate national team as defined under FIFA eligibility rules; some limited exceptions apply. Players may hold more than one non-FIFA nationality.

No.	Pos.	Nation	Player
10	FW	ZAM	Evans Kangwa (from (Turkey) Gaziantepspor)
11	MF	RUS	Sergei Tkachyov (on loan from (Russia) CSKA Moscow)
13	DF	ZAM	Stoppila Sunzu (loan extended from (France) Lille)
18	FW	MNE	Luka Đorđević (loan from (Russia) Zenit St.Petersburg)
20	MF	SRB	Goran Čaušić (from (Spain) Osasuna)
21	DF	ESP	Víctor Álvarez (from (Spain) Espanyol)
25	DF	RUS	Artyom Yarmolitsky
42	MF	RUS	Aleksandr Grebenshchikov
47	DF	RUS	Svyatoslav Artyushkin
54	MF	RUS	Osman Isayev
58	FW	RUS	Artyom Maksimenko (from (Russia) Spartak Dzhankoy)
81	MF	RUS	Vladimir Kabakhidze (from (Russia) CSKA Moscow)
91	FW	RUS	Konstantin Antipov (from (Russia) Tom Tomsk)
95	DF	RUS	Andrei Shustov (from (Russia) Chertanovo-M Moscow)
96	GK	RUS	Aleksandr Mironov
98	MF	RUS	Denis Sedykh (from (Russia) Dynamo-2 Moscow)
—	DF	RUS	Dmitry Aydov (end of loan to (Belarus) Gomel)
—	MF	RUS	Maksim Mashnev (end of loan to (Russia) Luch-Energiya Vladivostok)

Out: Note: Flags indicate national team as defined under FIFA eligibility rules; some limited exceptions apply. Players may hold more than one non-FIFA nationality.

No.	Pos.	Nation	Player
2	DF	RUS	Ivan Yershov (to (Russia) Pskov-747)
18	MF	RUS	Nikita Burmistrov (to (Russia) Baltika Kaliningrad)
20	MF	RUS	Vadim Steklov (to (Russia) Yenisey Krasnoyarsk)
21	DF	COL	Jherson Vergara (end of loan from (Italy) Milan)
26	MF	MLI	Moussa Doumbia (end of loan from (Russia) Rostov)
27	MF	RUS	Artyom Mingazov (to (Russia) Khimik Novomoskovsk)
28	MF	RUS	Vladislav Ryzhkov (to (Russia) Tambov)
30	FW	RUS	Dzhamshed Maksumov
31	GK	RUS	Aleksei Berezin
42	MF	RUS	Atsamaz Torchinov
44	FW	RUS	Roman Izotov (on loan to (Russia) Torpedo Moscow)
47	DF	RUS	Andrius Rukas (to (Portugal) União de Leiria)
48	MF	RUS	Roman Pekulov
49	MF	RUS	Nikita Golub (to (Russia) CRFSO Smolensk)
50	GK	RUS	Aleksandr Puchkov
54	MF	RUS	Daniil Zuyev
59	MF	RUS	Kirill Chernov
65	MF	RUS	Ilya Savkin
66	DF	RUS	Yevgeni Yezhov
67	DF	RUS	Aleksandr Tsogoyev
69	FW	RUS	Sergei Stepanov
70	FW	RUS	Valeri Alshanskiy
72	FW	RUS	Aleksandr Zharinov
74	DF	RUS	Ilya Salnikov (to (Russia) Zorky Krasnogorsk)
75	DF	RUS	Stepan Rebenko
76	MF	RUS	Maksim Zhumabekov (to (Russia) UOR #5 Yegoryevsk)
79	MF	RUS	Danila Buranov
80	MF	RUS	Aleksandr Gordiyenko
82	GK	RUS	Vladislav Suslov (to (Russia) Chayka Peschanokopskoye)
83	DF	RUS	Kirill Merkotan
84	MF	RUS	Oleg Vlasov (to (Russia) Dynamo St. Petersburg)
85	GK	RUS	Maksim Staroverov (to (Russia) Zenit Penza)
86	DF	BUL	Ivan Ivanov (to (Bulgaria) Beroe Stara Zagora)
87	MF	RUS	Aleksandr Kotenko
91	DF	RUS	Nikita Sorokin
92	MF	RUS	Aleksei Kiselyov
94	DF	RUS	Aleksandr Matrenov
95	DF	RUS	Artur Farion
96	DF	RUS	Yanis Linda
97	FW	RUS	Vladislav Kormishin (to (Russia) Akademiya Futbola Rostov-on-Don)
99	MF	RUS	Dmitri Starodub (to (Russia) Veles Moscow)
99	MF	RUS	Andrei Potapov (to (Russia) Rostov)
—	DF	RUS	Aleksandr Stolyarenko (on loan to (Russia) Rotor Volgograd, previously on loan to (Russia) Tambov)
—	MF	RUS	Sergei Ignatyev (released, previously on loan to (Russia) Sochi)
—	FW	CRC	Felicio Brown Forbes (to (Russia) Amkar Perm, previously on loan to (Russia) Anzhi Makhachkala)

=== Winter ===
In: Note: Flags indicate national team as defined under FIFA eligibility rules; some limited exceptions apply. Players may hold more than one non-FIFA nationality.

No.	Pos.	Nation	Player
1	GK	RUS	Igor Obukhov (on loan from (Russia) Zenit Saint Petersburg)
15	MF	CIV	Habib Maïga (on loan from (France) Saint-Étienne)
24	FW	RUS	Artem Dzyuba (on loan from (Russia) Zenit Saint Petersburg)
37	DF	RUS	Aleksei Rodinkov
52	DF	RUS	Ivan Novoseltsev (on loan from (Russia) Zenit Saint Petersburg)
74	MF	RUS	Eduard Sholokh (from (Russia) Lokomotiv Moscow)
78	MF	RUS	Bogdan Petosh
92	MF	RUS	Sergei Svitlik

Out: Note: Flags indicate national team as defined under FIFA eligibility rules; some limited exceptions apply. Players may hold more than one non-FIFA nationality.

No.	Pos.	Nation	Player
30	GK	RUS	Vladimir Gabulov (to (Belgium) Club Brugge)
40	DF	RUS	Pavel Borisov
41	DF	RUS	Dmitri Doronin (to (Russia) Saturn Ramenskoye)
54	MF	RUS	Osman Isayev
68	FW	RUS	Nikita Melnikov (to (Russia) Strogino Moscow)
81	MF	RUS	Vladimir Kabakhidze
86	DF	RUS	Rustam Normatov

== Friendlies ==
27 January 2018	Gabala (Azerbaijan)	3 – 3	(Russia) Arsenal Tula	Antalya, Turkey
17:00 MSK (UTC+3)	Ozobić 16'; Joseph-Monrose 32'; Vernydub 83'	Report	Berkhamov 5', 28', 44'

== Competitions ==
=== Russian Premier League ===
==== Results by round ====
Round	1	2	3	4	5	6	7	8	9	10	11	12	13	14	15	16	17	18	19	20	21	22	23	24	25	26	27	28	29	30
Ground	A	H	A	H	A	H	A	A	A	H	A	H	A	A	H	A	H	A	H	A	A	A	H	A	H	A	A	H	A	H
Result	L	W	L	L	L	D	W	L	D	W	L	W	W	L	W	W	D	L	L	D	W	W	D	L	W	L	D	W	L	W
Position	14	9	10	14	13	13	13	13	13	10	12	11	8	9	8	7	8	9	9	8	7	7	7	7	6	7	7	7	7	7

Updated to match(es) played on 13 May 2018. Source: See Results
A = Away; H = Home; W = Win; D = Draw; L = Loss

==== Results ====
18 July 2017 1	Lokomotiv Moscow	1 – 0	Arsenal Tula	Moscow
19:30 MSK (UTC+3)	Barinov (yellow card) 28'; Kvirkvelia 57'	Report	Aleksandrov (yellow card) 56'; Sunzu (yellow card) 60'	Stadium: Lokomotiv Stadium; Attendance: 6,166; Referee: Aleksey Sukhoy

24 July 2017 2	Arsenal Tula	1 – 0	SKA-Khabarovsk	Tula
19:30 MSK (UTC+3)	Tkachyov 18'; Gabulov (yellow card) 90+4'; Čaušić (yellow card) 90+4'	Report	Kazankov (yellow card) 31'; Cherevko (yellow card) 40'	Stadium: Arsenal Stadium; Attendance: 12,700; Referee: Evgeny Turbin

29 July 2017 3	Rubin Kazan	2 – 1	Arsenal Tula	Kazan
17:30 MSK (UTC+3)	Granat (yellow card) 51'; Song 60'; Caktaš 74' (pen.); Kambolov (yellow card) 86'	Report	Shevchenko 34' (yellow card) 65'; Aleksandrov (yellow card) 58'	Stadium: Kazan Arena; Attendance: 7,220; Referee: Vladimir Moskalyov

6 August 2017 4	Arsenal Tula	1 – 2	Tosno	Tula
15:00 MSK (UTC+3)	Berkhamov 40' (yellow card) 55'	Report	Galiulin 48'; Markov 55'	Stadium: Arsenal Stadium; Attendance: 11,150; Referee: Sergey Ivanov

9 August 2017 5	Spartak Moscow	2 – 0	Arsenal Tula	Moscow
19:30 MSK (UTC+3)	Promes 20'; Tigiyev (yellow card) 24'; Samedov (yellow card) 64'; Zé Luís 84'	Report	Álvarez (yellow card) 45+2'; Denisov (yellow card) 75'; Belyayev (yellow card) 90+2'	Stadium: Otkrytiye Arena; Attendance: 26,183; Referee: Sergey Kulikov

14 August 2017 6	Arsenal Tula	2 – 2	Ural Yekaterinburg	Tula
19:30 MSK (UTC+3)	Sunzu 5'; Maksimov 10'; Čaušić (yellow card) 18'; Shevchenko (yellow card) 90+2'	Report	Yemelyanov (yellow card) 37'; Bicfalvi 42' (yellow card) 79'; Yevseyev 69'; Bavin (yellow card) 77'	Stadium: Arsenal Stadium; Attendance: 10,050; Referee: Aleksey Sukhoy

21 August 2017 7	Akhmat Grozny	1 – 2	Arsenal Tula	Grozny
20:00 MSK (UTC+3)	Shvets (yellow card) 55'; Sadayev 74'	Report	Tkachyov 30'; Đorđević 76' (yellow card) 77'; Álvarez (yellow card) 83'	Stadium: Akhmat-Arena; Attendance: 17,134; Referee: Vladimir Moskalyov

26 August 2017 8	Arsenal Tula	0 – 1	Amkar Perm	Tula
15:00 MSK (UTC+3)	Sunzu (yellow card) 50'; Belyayev (yellow card) 75'	Report	Ryazantsev 21'; Nigmatullin (yellow card) 90'	Stadium: Arsenal Stadium; Attendance: 10,870; Referee: Evgeny Turbin

9 September 2017 9	Rostov	2 – 2	Arsenal Tula	Rostov-on-Don
16:30 MSK (UTC+3)	Yusupov 7'; Kalachev 85' (pen.)	Report	Đorđević 32', 70'; Maksimov (yellow card) 52'; Belyayev (yellow card) 84'; Čaušić (yellow card) 86'	Stadium: Olimp-2; Attendance: 10,856; Referee: Aleksei Nikolaev

15 September 2017 10	Arsenal Tula	1 – 0	Dynamo Moscow	Tula
19:30 MSK (UTC+3)	Belyayev 16'; Shevchenko (yellow card) 67'; Kombarov (yellow card) 90+4'	Report	Sosnin (yellow card) 24'; Terekhov (yellow card) 44'	Stadium: Arsenal Stadium; Attendance: 12,450; Referee: Mikhail Vilkov

24 September 2017 11	Ufa	1 – 0	Arsenal Tula	Ufa
16:30 MSK (UTC+3)	Tumasyan (yellow card) 34'; Sly 77'; Sysuyev (yellow card) 82'; Belenov (yellow card) 90+1'; Stotsky (yellow card) 90+1'	Report	Shevchenko (yellow card) 42'	Stadium: Neftyanik Stadium; Attendance: 3,827; Referee: Vladislav Bezborodov

29 September 2017 12	Arsenal Tula	1 – 0	Krasnodar	Tula
19:30 MSK (UTC+3)	Đorđević 16'; Gorbatenko (yellow card) 44'; Bourceanu (yellow card) 45+1'	Report	Kaboré (red card) 56'; Martynovich (yellow card) 90'	Stadium: Arsenal Stadium; Attendance: 10,064; Referee: Sergey Ivanov

15 October 2017 13	Arsenal Tula	0 – 1	Zenit St.Petersburg	Saint Petersburg
19:00 MSK (UTC+3)	Paredes (yellow card) 77'	Report	Čaušić (yellow card) 37'; Sunzu (yellow card) 53'; Kangwa 73'; Gabulov (yellow card) 90+3'	Stadium: Krestovsky Stadium; Attendance: 45,746; Referee: Artem Chistyakov

22 October 2017 14	Anzhi Makhachkala	3 – 2	Arsenal Tula	Kaspiysk
19:00 MSK (UTC+3)	Gabulov 7' (o.g.); Khubulov 49' (pen.); Guliyev 64'; Samardžić (yellow card) 83'	Report	Tkachyov 40' (yellow card) 77'; Đorđević 65'; Kombarov (yellow card) 90+4'	Stadium: Anzhi Arena; Attendance: 3,850; Referee: Vladislav Bezborodov

27 October 2017 15	Arsenal Tula	1 – 0	CSKA Moscow	Tula
19:30 MSK (UTC+3)	Causic 80'; Grigalava (yellow card) 85'	Report	Kuchayev (yellow card) 23' (yellow-red card) 54'; Natkho (yellow card) 90+1'	Stadium: Arsenal Stadium; Attendance: 15,120; Referee: Sergey Lapochkin

5 November 2017 16	SKA-Khabarovsk	0 – 1	Arsenal Tula	Khabarovsk
11:00 MSK (UTC+3)	Fedotov 33'; Dedechko (yellow card) 39'; Ediyev (yellow card) 59'	Report	Kangwa 5'; Grigalava (yellow card) 42'; Đorđević 86'; Gorbatenko (yellow card) 90+1'	Stadium: Lenin Stadium; Attendance: 4,155; Referee: Evgeny Turbin

18 November 2017 17	Arsenal Tula	0 – 0	Rubin Kazan	Tula
19:00 MSK (UTC+3)	Gorbatenko (yellow card) 29'; Khagush (yellow card) 45'	Report	Kudryashov (yellow card) 43'	Stadium: Arsenal Stadium; Attendance: 9,688; Referee: Vladimir Seldyakov

25 November 2017 18	Tosno	3 – 2	Arsenal Tula	Saint Petersburg
16:30 MSK (UTC+3)	Markov 61', 79', 81'	Report	Čaušić 28'; Grigalava (yellow card) 68'; Tkachyov 76'	Stadium: Petrovsky Stadium; Attendance: 3,079; Referee: Alexey Nikolaev

1 December 2017 19	Arsenal Tula	0 – 1	Spartak Moscow	Tula
19:30 MSK (UTC+3)	Grigalava (yellow card) 17'; Đorđević (yellow card) 67'	Report	Kutepov (yellow card) 40'; Glushakov (yellow card) 79' (goal) 90'	Stadium: Arsenal Stadium; Attendance: 14,690; Referee: Vladislav Bezborodov

8 December 2017 20	Ural Yekaterinburg	1 – 1	Arsenal Tula	Yekaterinburg
17:30 MSK (UTC+3)	Portnyagin 30'; Haroyan (yellow card) 87'	Report	Sunzu (yellow card) 57'; Đorđević 73'	Stadium: SKB-Bank Arena; Attendance: 1,345; Referee: Vitaly Meshkov

4 March 2018 21	Arsenal Tula	1 – 0	Akhmat Grozny	Tula
19:00 MSK (UTC+3)	Khagush (yellow card) 80'; Čaušić 90+1' (yellow card) 90+1'; Grigalava (yellow card) 90+4'; Dzyuba (yellow card) 90+4'	Report	Rodolfo (red card) 90+4'; Semyonov (yellow card) 90+4'	Stadium: Arsenal Stadium; Attendance: 7,080; Referee: Vladislav Bezborodov

9 March 2018 22	Amkar Perm	0 – 2	Arsenal Tula	Perm
14:00 MSK (UTC+3)	Belorukov (yellow card) 67' (yellow-red card) 80'; Ogude (red card) 76'	Report	Dzyuba (penalty missed) 11' 11' (yellow card) 67'; Kangwa (yellow card) 58' (penalty missed) 81'; Tkachyov 83'	Stadium: Zvezda Stadium; Attendance: 1,089; Referee: Mikhail Vilkov

17 March 2018 23	Arsenal Tula	2 – 2	Rostov	Tula
14:00 MSK (UTC+3)	Dzyuba 14', 59'; Aleksandrov (yellow card) 16'; Gorbatenko (yellow card) 56'; Álvarez (yellow card) 87'	Report	Ionov 8', 31'; Sapeta (yellow card) 31'; Zuyev (yellow card) 72'	Stadium: Arsenal Stadium; Attendance: 7,760; Referee: Sergey Lapochkin

31 March 2018 24	Dynamo Moscow	2 – 1	Arsenal Tula	Khimki
16:30 MSK (UTC+3)	Rykov 71'; Černych 74' (yellow card) 75'; Panchenko (penalty missed) 81'	Report	Berkhamov (yellow card) 42'; Dzyuba 53'; Kombarov (yellow card) 73'; Novoseltsev (yellow card) 80'	Stadium: Arena Khimki; Attendance: 5,374; Referee: Vladimir Moskalyov

7 April 2018 25	Arsenal Tula	2 – 1	Ufa	Tula
19:00 MSK (UTC+3)	Gorbatenko 2', 72'; Belyayev (yellow card) 40'	Report	Sysuyev (yellow card) 5'; Stotsky 16'; Salatić (yellow card) 56'; Jokić (yellow card) 64'	Stadium: Arsenal Stadium; Attendance: 10,250; Referee: Kirill Levnikov

14 April 2018 26	Krasnodar	3 – 0	Arsenal Tula	Krasnodar
19:00 MSK (UTC+3)	Claesson 4' (yellow card) 90+2'; Petrov 23' (yellow card) 81'; Smolov (yellow card) 34'; Joãozinho (yellow card) 59'; Laborde 86'	Report	Berkhamov (yellow card) 8'; Khagush (yellow card) 57'	Stadium: Krasnodar Stadium; Attendance: 19,667; Referee: Artem Chistyakov

22 April 2018 27	Arsenal Tula	3 – 3	Zenit St.Petersburg	Tula
14:00 MSK (UTC+3)	Gorbatenko 3' (yellow card) 23' (yellow-red card) 77'; Tkachyov 45' (yellow card) 45+1'; Aleksandrov (yellow card) 81'; Dzyuba 88'	Report	Driussi (yellow card) 26'; Paredes 36'; Kuzyayev 82', 84'	Stadium: Arsenal Stadium; Attendance: 17,650; Referee: Vladimir Moskalyov

28 April 2018 28	Arsenal Tula	2 – 1	Anzhi Makhachkala	Tula
19:30 MSK (UTC+3)	Berkhamov 16'; Sunzu 62'; Kangwa (yellow card) 88'; Adzhoyev (yellow card) 90+4'	Report	Khubulov 22'; Samardžić (yellow card) 59'; Danchenko (yellow card) 73'; Armaș (yellow card) 86'	Stadium: Arsenal Stadium; Attendance: 11,200; Referee: Sergey Karasev

6 May 2018 29	CSKA Moscow	6 – 0	Arsenal Tula	Moscow
19:00 MSK (UTC+3)	Chalov 2', 21', 43'; Musa 11', 49'; Golovin 40'	Report	Aleksandrov (yellow card) 36'	Stadium: VEB Arena; Attendance: 18,311; Referee: Kirill Levnikov

13 May 2018 30	Arsenal Tula	2 – 0	Lokomotiv Moscow	Tula
14:00 MSK (UTC+3)	Dzyuba 29'; Belyayev (yellow card) 41'; Sunzu (yellow card) 53'; Khagush (yellow card) 78'; Berkhamov 90+1'	Report	Kvirkvelia (yellow card) 45+1' (yellow-red card) 86'; Rotenberg (yellow card) 57'; Fernandes (yellow card) 80'	Stadium: Arsenal Stadium; Attendance: 18,175; Referee: Evgeny Turbin

==== League table ====
Pos	Team	Pld	W	D	L	GF	GA	GD	Pts	Qualification or relegation
5	Zenit Saint Petersburg	30	14	11	5	46	21	+25	53	Qualification for the Europa League third qualifying round (Note: Tosno qualified for the Europa League group stage by winning the 2017–18 Russian Cup. However, since they failed to obtain a UEFA licence, the spot awarded to the cup winners was passed to fourth-placed team, the spot awarded to the fourth-placed team was passed to fifth-placed team, and the spot awarded to the fifth-placed team was passed to sixth-placed team.)
6	Ufa	30	11	10	9	34	30	+4	43	Qualification for the Europa League second qualifying round
7	Arsenal Tula	30	12	6	12	35	41	−6	42	
8	Dynamo Moscow	30	10	10	10	29	30	−1	40	
9	Akhmat Grozny	30	10	9	11	30	34	−4	39	

Updated to match(es) played on 13 May 2018. Source: Russian Premier League, Soccerway
Rules for classification: 1) Points; 2) Head-to-head points; 3) Head-to-head matches won; 4) Head-to-head goal difference; 5) Head-to-head goals scored; 6) Head-to-head away goals; 7) Matches won; 8) Goal difference; 9) Goals scored; 10) Away goals scored.

=== Russian Cup ===
20 September 2017 Round of 32	Tambov	1 – 0	Arsenal Tula	Tambov
15:00 MSK (UTC+3)	Ovsiyenko (yellow card) 43'; Skvortsov 90'; Smirnov (yellow card) 90+5'	Report	Khagush (yellow card) 79'; Denisov (yellow card) 81'	Stadium: Spartak Stadium; Attendance: 4,500; Referee: Nikolay Voloshin

== Squad statistics ==
As of Match played 13 May 2018

=== Appearances and goals ===
No.	Pos	Nat	Player	Total		Premier League		Russian Cup	
No.	Pos	Nat	Player	Apps	Goals	Apps	Goals	Apps	Goals
1	GK	(Russia) RUS	Igor Obukhov	1	0	1	0	0	0
6	DF	(Russia) RUS	Maksim Belyayev	28	1	27	1	1	0
7	MF	(Russia) RUS	Kantemir Berkhamov	17	3	11+6	3	0	0
8	DF	(Georgia (country)) GEO	Gia Grigalava	11	0	8+3	0	0	0
9	DF	(Russia) RUS	Kirill Kombarov	24	0	24	0	0	0
10	FW	(Zambia) ZAM	Evans Kangwa	19	2	17+1	2	1	0
11	MF	(Russia) RUS	Sergei Tkachyov	29	6	27+1	6	1	0
13	DF	(Zambia) ZAM	Stoppila Sunzu	29	2	28	2	1	0
14	DF	(Russia) RUS	Anri Khagush	18	0	7+10	0	1	0
15	MF	(Ivory Coast) CIV	Habib Maïga	1	0	1	0	0	0
17	FW	(Russia) RUS	Guram Adzhoyev	1	0	0+1	0	0	0
18	FW	(Montenegro) MNE	Luka Đorđević	23	7	18+4	7	0+1	0
19	FW	(Argentina) ARG	Federico Rasic	19	0	2+16	0	1	0
20	MF	(Serbia) SRB	Goran Čaušić	27	3	25+1	3	1	0
21	DF	(Spain) ESP	Víctor Álvarez	21	0	20+1	0	0	0
23	MF	(Russia) RUS	Igor Gorbatenko	25	3	20+4	3	1	0
24	FW	(Russia) RUS	Artem Dzyuba	10	6	10	6	0	0
33	FW	(Russia) RUS	Aslanbek Sikoyev	4	0	0+4	0	0	0
36	GK	(Russia) RUS	Mikhail Levashov	10	0	9	0	1	0
52	DF	(Russia) RUS	Ivan Novoseltsev	2	0	2	0	0	0
55	MF	(Romania) ROU	Alexandru Bourceanu	21	0	18+2	0	0+1	0
71	DF	(Russia) RUS	Aleksandr Denisov	10	0	2+7	0	1	0
77	MF	(Bulgaria) BUL	Mihail Aleksandrov	20	0	14+5	0	1	0
80	MF	(Russia) RUS	Yaroslav Ivakin	1	0	0+1	0	0	0
87	MF	(Russia) RUS	Ilya Maksimov	11	1	7+4	1	0	0
88	FW	(Russia) RUS	Igor Shevchenko	18	0	12+5	0	0+1	0
Players away from the club on loan:
Players who left Arsenal Tula during the season:
30	GK	(Russia) RUS	Vladimir Gabulov	20	0	20	0	0	0

=== Goal scorers ===
Place	Position	Nation	Number	Name	Premier League	Russian Cup	Total
1	FW	(Montenegro)	18	Luka Đorđević	7	0	7
2	MF	(Russia)	11	Sergei Tkachyov	6	0	6
2	FW	(Russia)	24	Artem Dzyuba	6	0	6
4	MF	(Serbia)	20	Goran Čaušić	3	0	3
4	MF	(Russia)	23	Igor Gorbatenko	3	0	3
4	MF	(Russia)	7	Kantemir Berkhamov	3	0	3
7	FW	(Zambia)	10	Evans Kangwa	2	0	2
7	DF	(Zambia)	13	Stoppila Sunzu	2	0	2
9	FW	(Russia)	88	Igor Shevchenko	1	0	1
9	MF	(Russia)	87	Ilya Maksimov	1	0	1
9	DF	(Russia)	6	Maksim Belyayev	1	0	1
				TOTALS	35	0	35

=== Disciplinary record ===
Number	Nation	Position	Name	Premier League		Russian Cup		Total	
Number	Nation	Position	Name	Yellow card	Red card	Yellow card	Red card	Yellow card	Red card
6	(Russia)	DF	Maksim Belyayev	5	0	0	0	5	0
7	(Russia)	MF	Kantemir Berkhamov	3	0	0	0	3	0
8	(Georgia (country))	DF	Gia Grigalava	5	0	0	0	5	0
9	(Russia)	DF	Kirill Kombarov	3	0	0	0	3	0
10	(Zambia)	FW	Evans Kangwa	2	0	0	0	2	0
11	(Russia)	MF	Sergei Tkachyov	2	0	0	0	2	0
13	(Zambia)	DF	Stoppila Sunzu	5	0	0	0	5	0
14	(Russia)	DF	Anri Khagush	4	0	1	0	5	0
17	(Russia)	FW	Guram Adzhoyev	1	0	0	0	1	0
18	(Montenegro)	FW	Luka Đorđević	2	0	0	0	2	0
20	(Serbia)	MF	Goran Čaušić	5	0	0	0	5	0
21	(Spain)	DF	Víctor Álvarez	3	0	0	0	3	0
23	(Russia)	MF	Igor Gorbatenko	6	1	0	0	6	1
24	(Russia)	FW	Artem Dzyuba	2	0	0	0	2	0
52	(Russia)	DF	Ivan Novoseltsev	1	0	0	0	1	0
55	(Romania)	MF	Alexandru Bourceanu	1	0	0	0	1	0
71	(Russia)	DF	Aleksandr Denisov	1	0	1	0	2	0
77	(Bulgaria)	MF	Mihail Aleksandrov	5	0	0	0	5	0
87	(Russia)	MF	Ilya Maksimov	1	0	0	0	1	0
88	(Russia)	FW	Igor Shevchenko	4	0	0	0	4	0
Players who left Arsenal Tula during the season:
30	(Russia)	GK	Vladimir Gabulov	2	0	0	0	2	0
			TOTALS	63	1	2	0	65	1
