= 2018–19 FC Arsenal Tula season =

Arsenal Tula
2018–19 season
- Chairman: Guram Adzhoyev
- Manager: Oleg Kononov (until 11 November); Igor Cherevchenko (from 13 November)
- Stadium: Arsenal Stadium
- Russian Premier League: 6th
- Russian Cup: Semifinal vs Ural Yekaterinburg
- Top goalscorer: League: Zelimkhan Bakayev (8); All: Luka Đorđević (9)
Home colours	Away colours	Third colours

The 2018–19 FC Arsenal Tula season was the club's third season back in the Russian Premier League, the highest tier of association football in Russia, since relegation at the end of the 2014–15 season, and their fourth in total. Arsenal Tula finished the season in 6th and were knocked out of the Russian Cup by Ural Yekaterinburg in the semifinals. Due to Ural's defeat to Lokomotiv Moscow in the Cup Final, Arsenal Tula qualified for the 2019–20 UEFA Europa League qualifying stages for the first time.

== Season events ==
On 1 June, Oleg Kononov was announced as Arsenal Tula's new manager. Kononov left Arsenal Tula by mutual consent on 12 November, with Igor Cherevchenko being announced as his replacement on 13 November.

== Squad ==
As of 11 February 2019

Note: Flags indicate national team as defined under FIFA eligibility rules; some limited exceptions apply. Players may hold more than one non-FIFA nationality.

No.	Pos.	Nation	Player
1	GK	RUS	Artur Nigmatullin
5	DF	GHA	Abdul Kadiri Mohammed (on loan from Austria Wien)
6	DF	RUS	Maksim Belyayev
7	MF	RUS	Kantemir Berkhamov
8	DF	GEO	Gia Grigalava
9	DF	RUS	Kirill Kombarov
10	MF	ZAM	Evans Kangwa
11	MF	RUS	Sergei Tkachyov
13	DF	BLR	Maksim Valadzko
14	DF	RUS	Anri Khagush
17	FW	RUS	Guram Adzhoyev
18	FW	MNE	Luka Đorđević (on loan from Zenit St. Petersburg)
19	MF	RUS	Reziuan Mirzov (on loan from FC Rostov)

No.	Pos.	Nation	Player
21	DF	ESP	Víctor Álvarez
22	FW	RUS	Daniil Lesovoy (on loan from Zenit St. Petersburg)
23	MF	RUS	Igor Gorbatenko
26	DF	BFA	Bakary Koné
33	DF	RUS	Artyom Sokol
36	GK	RUS	Mikhail Levashov
45	FW	SRB	Ognjen Ožegović (on loan from Partizan)
50	GK	RUS	Yegor Shamov
70	MF	BUL	Georgi Kostadinov
71	DF	RUS	Aleksandr Denisov
77	MF	BUL	Mihail Aleksandrov
78	MF	RUS	Zelimkhan Bakayev (on loan from Spartak Moscow)
80	MF	RUS	Yaroslav Ivakin

== Transfers ==
=== Summer ===
In: Note: Flags indicate national team as defined under FIFA eligibility rules; some limited exceptions apply. Players may hold more than one non-FIFA nationality.

No.	Pos.	Nation	Player
1	GK	RUS	Artur Nigmatullin (from (Russia) Amkar Perm)
5	DF	GHA	Abdul Kadiri Mohammed (on loan from Austria Wien)
19	MF	RUS	Reziuan Mirzov (on loan from (Russia) Rostov)
22	FW	RUS	Daniil Lesovoy (on loan from (Russia) Zenit Saint Petersburg)
31	FW	RUS	Yegor Prilepsky (from (Russia) Energomash Belgorod)
33	DF	RUS	Artyom Sokol (from (Russia) Spartak Moscow)
45	FW	SRB	Ognjen Ožegović (on loan from (Serbia) Partizan)
50	GK	RUS	Yegor Shamov (from (Russia) Luch Vladivostok)
57	MF	RUS	Kirill Orekhov (from (Russia) Spartak Moscow)
69	FW	RUS	Nikita Yeryomenko
70	MF	BUL	Georgi Kostadinov (from (Israel) Maccabi Haifa)
78	MF	RUS	Zelimkhan Bakayev (on loan from (Russia) Spartak Moscow)
87	MF	RUS	Yuri Petrovskiy
89	FW	RUS	Luchano Bobrov (from (Russia) Dynamo Moscow academy)
90	DF	RUS	Aleksandr Krikunenko (from (Russia) Khimik Novomoskovsk)
93	MF	RUS	Denis Patsev (from (Russia) Spartak Moscow)
99	DF	RUS	Ilya Ivanov (from (Russia) Spartak Moscow)

Out: Note: Flags indicate national team as defined under FIFA eligibility rules; some limited exceptions apply. Players may hold more than one non-FIFA nationality.

No.	Pos.	Nation	Player
1	GK	RUS	Igor Obukhov (end of loan from (Russia) Zenit Saint Petersburg)
13	DF	ZAM	Stoppila Sunzu (end of loan from (France) Lille)
15	MF	CIV	Habib Maïga (end of loan from (France) Saint-Étienne)
16	GK	RUS	Aleksei Berezin (to (Belarus) Dnepr Mogilev)
19	FW	ARG	Federico Rasic (to (Cyprus) Pafos)
20	MF	SRB	Goran Čaušić (to (Serbia) Red Star Belgrade)
22	MF	RUS	Danila Buranov (to (Russia) Strogino Moscow)
24	FW	RUS	Artem Dzyuba (end of loan from (Russia) Zenit Saint Petersburg)
25	DF	RUS	Artyom Yarmolitsky (to (Russia) Khimik Novomoskovsk)
27	MF	RUS	Artyom Mingazov (to (Russia) Khimik Novomoskovsk, previously on loan)
33	FW	RUS	Aslanbek Sikoyev
35	GK	RUS	Nikita Makeyev (to (Russia) Tekstilshchik Ivanovo)
41	MF	RUS	Dmitry Doronin (to (Russia) Saturn Ramenskoye)
45	FW	RUS	Arkady Lobzin (to (Russia) Torpedo Vladimir)
47	DF	RUS	Svyatoslav Artyushkin
52	DF	RUS	Ivan Novoseltsev (end of loan from (Russia) Zenit Saint Petersburg)
55	MF	ROU	Alexandru Bourceanu (to (Romania) Dunărea Călărași)
65	DF	RUS	Boris Samoylov (to (Russia) Khimki-M)
74	MF	RUS	Eduard Sholokh
87	MF	RUS	Ilya Maksimov
88	MF	RUS	Igor Shevchenko (to (Russia) Syzran-2003)
91	FW	RUS	Konstantin Antipov (to (Russia) Sibir-2 Novosibirsk)
95	DF	RUS	Andrei Shustov
98	MF	RUS	Denis Sedykh
—	DF	RUS	Aleksandr Stolyarenko (to (Russia) Tyumen, previously on loan to (Russia) Rotor Volgograd)
—	MF	RUS	Maksim Mashnev (to (Russia) Luch-Energiya Vladivostok, previously on loan)
—	MF	RUS	Vladislav Ryzhkov (to (Russia) Sibir Novosibirsk, previously on loan to (Russia) Tambov)
—	MF	RUS	Vadim Steklov (to (Russia) Avangard Kursk, previously on loan to (Russia) Yenisey Krasnoyarsk)
—	FW	RUS	Roman Izotov (to (Russia) Khimik Novomoskovsk, previously on loan to (Russia) Torpedo Moscow)

=== Winter ===
In: Note: Flags indicate national team as defined under FIFA eligibility rules; some limited exceptions apply. Players may hold more than one non-FIFA nationality.

No.	Pos.	Nation	Player
13	DF	BLR	Maksim Valadzko (from (Belarus) BATE)
26	DF	BFA	Bakary Koné (from (Turkey) Ankaragücü)
35	GK	RUS	Denis Mukhin (from (Russia) Krasnodar)
66	FW	RUS	Stanislav Krokhin (from (Russia) Dynamo Moscow)
68	MF	RUS	Ilya Bykovsky
73	DF	RUS	Arseni Levshuk (from (Russia) Spartak Moscow academy)
74	FW	RUS	Ruslan Kul (from (Russia) Lokomotiv Moscow)
76	MF	RUS	Vladimir Laptev
79	MF	RUS	Yuri Yevdokimov
81	MF	RUS	Timur Farrakhov (from (Russia) Yenisey Krasnoyarsk)
86	DF	RUS	Timofey Prokopenko
94	MF	RUS	Georgy Sulakvelidze
95	FW	RUS	Daniil Pavlov

Out: Note: Flags indicate national team as defined under FIFA eligibility rules; some limited exceptions apply. Players may hold more than one non-FIFA nationality.

No.	Pos.	Nation	Player
31	MF	RUS	Yegor Prilepsky
33	DF	RUS	Artyom Sokol (on loan to (Norway) Tromsø)
43	MF	RUS	Konstantin Markin
57	MF	RUS	Kirill Orekhov
63	MF	RUS	Dzhamshed Maksumov (to (Tajikistan) Istiklol)
69	FW	RUS	Nikita Yeryomenko
87	MF	RUS	Yuri Petrovskiy
89	FW	RUS	Luchano Bobrov (to (Russia) Khimki-M)

== Competitions ==
=== Russian Premier League ===
==== Results by round ====
Round	1	2	3	4	5	6	7	8	9	10	11	12	13	14	15	16	17	18	19	20	21	22	23	24	25	26	27	28	29	30
Ground	H	A	H	A	H	A	H	H	A	H	A	H	A	H	A	H	A	H	A	H	A	A	H	A	H	A	H	A	H	A
Result	D	L	W	L	L	D	W	D	L	D	W	D	L	W	L	W	L	W	D	W	W	D	D	W	W	D	W	W	L	D
Position	9	14	7	10	10	12	11	10	13	12	10	10	12	11	11	10	11	9	9	9	9	7	8	8	6	6	6	6	6	6

Updated to match(es) played on 26 May 2019. Source: See Results
A = Away; H = Home; W = Win; D = Draw; L = Loss

==== Results ====
29 July 2018 1	Arsenal Tula	0 – 0	Dynamo Moscow	Tula
16:30 MSK (UTC+3)	Čaušić (yellow card) 9'; Berkhamov (yellow card) 52'; Grigalava (yellow card) 89'	Report	Tetteh (red card) 7'; Markov (yellow card) 87'	Stadium: Arsenal Stadium; Attendance: 15,646; Referee: Stanislav Vasilyev

4 August 2018 2	Zenit St.Petersburg	1 – 0	Arsenal Tula	Saint Petersburg
16:30 MSK (UTC+3)	Paredes (yellow card) 49'; Shatov 61'; Nabiullin (yellow card) 76'	Report	Grigalava (yellow card) 90'	Stadium: Krestovsky Stadium; Attendance: 47,004; Referee: Aleksei Matyunin

12 August 2018 3	Arsenal Tula	3 – 1	Akhmat Grozny	Tula
16:30 MSK (UTC+3)	Berkhamov (yellow card) 37' (yellow-red card) 41'; Belyayev (yellow card) 44'; Đorđević 53'; Bakayev 57'; Lesovoy 90+4'	Report	Roshi (yellow card) 23'; Ivanov 39'; Balaj (yellow card) 45'; Utsiyev (yellow card) 45+2'; Shvets (yellow card) 54'; Berisha (yellow card) 62'; Doumbia (yellow card) 90'; Mbengue (yellow card) 90+5'	Stadium: Arsenal Stadium; Attendance: 11,554; Referee: Sergey Lapochkin

18 August 2018 4	CSKA Moscow	3 – 0	Arsenal Tula	Moscow
16:30 MSK (UTC+3)	Hernández 10'; Magnússon (yellow card) 70'; Bistrović 77'; Chalov 82'	Report	Khagush (yellow card) 37'; Đorđević (yellow card) 45+1'; Grigalava (red card) 67'; Mohammed (yellow card) 72'	Stadium: VEB Arena; Attendance: 15,948; Referee: Vladislav Bezborodov

24 August 2018 5	Arsenal Tula	0 – 1	Rostov	Tula
19:30 MSK (UTC+3)		Report	Ionov 65' (pen.); Zuyev (yellow card) 88'; Gațcan (yellow card) 90+4'	Stadium: Arsenal Stadium; Attendance: 12,289; Referee: Kirill Levnikov

2 September 2018 6	Yenisey Krasnoyarsk	0 – 0	Arsenal Tula	Tyumen
14:00 MSK (UTC+3)	Ogude (yellow card) 77'; Torbinski (yellow card) 90+3'	Report	Kostadinov (yellow card) 65'; Denisov (yellow card) 70'	Stadium: Geolog Stadium; Attendance: 1,285; Referee: Sergey Ivanov
Note: Match played at the Geolog Stadium in Tyumen, due renovation work at Yenisey Krasnoyarsk's Central Stadium in Krasnoyarsk.

15 September 2018 7	Arsenal Tula	4 – 0	Krylia Sovetov	Tula
19:00 MSK (UTC+3)	Tkachyov 21', 50'; Đorđević 73'; Bakayev 82'	Report	Mollo (yellow card) 78'	Stadium: Arsenal Stadium; Attendance: 10,130; Referee: Sergei Karasev

22 September 2018 8	Arsenal Tula	2 – 2	Rubin Kazan	Tula
16:30 MSK (UTC+3)	Mohammed 13'; Berkhamov (yellow card) 24'; Bakayev 76'; Denisov (yellow card) 79'; Lesovoy (yellow card) 85'	Report	Podberyozkin (yellow card) 7'; Mogilevets (yellow card) 69'; Konovalov 77'; Bayramyan (penalty missed) 79'; Bukharov (yellow card) 83'; Uremović 90+2' (yellow card) 90+3'; Navas (yellow card) 90+5'	Stadium: Arsenal Stadium; Attendance: 11,805; Referee: Nikolay Voloshin

29 September 2018 9	Ural Yekaterinburg	2 – 1	Arsenal Tula	Yekaterinburg
11:30 MSK (UTC+3)	Kulakov (yellow card) 56'; Panyukov 63', 84'; Boumal (yellow card) 83'; Bicfalvi (yellow card) 90+4'	Report	Tkachyov 27'; Khagush (yellow card) 52'; Berkhamov (yellow card) 61'	Stadium: Central Stadium; Attendance: 11,217; Referee: Sergey Lapochkin

5 October 2018 10	Arsenal Tula	1 – 1	Ufa	Tula
19:30 MSK (UTC+3)	Kostadinov 70'	Report	Sysuyev (yellow card) 19'; Igboun 45+2'; Carp (yellow card) 90+4'	Stadium: Arsenal Stadium; Attendance: 8,752; Referee: Sergei Karasev

21 October 2018 11	Spartak Moscow	2 – 3	Arsenal Tula	Moscow
16:30 MSK (UTC+3)	Zé Luís 13', 45+2'; Kutepov (yellow card) 35'; Fernando (yellow card) 40'; Petković (yellow card) 45+3'	Report	Ožegović (penalty missed) 35' 35' (yellow card) 40'; Lesovoy 48'; Mirzov 65'	Stadium: Otkritie Arena; Attendance: 31,684; Referee: Mikhail Vilkov

27 October 2018 12	Arsenal Tula	2 – 2	Orenburg	Tula
16:30 MSK (UTC+3)	Gorbatenko (yellow card) 21'; Mirzov 42'; Đorđević 64'; Tkachyov (yellow card) 78'	Report	Oyewole (yellow card) 38'; Sivakow (yellow card) 50'; Terekhov 61'; Popović 76' (yellow card) 85'	Stadium: Arsenal Stadium; Attendance: 8,744; Referee: Aleksey Sukhoy

3 November 2018 13	Lokomotiv Moscow	3 – 1	Arsenal Tula	Moscow
14:00 MSK (UTC+3)	Höwedes 26'; Barinov (yellow card) 32'; Miranchuk 70', 74'; Idowu (yellow card) 76'	Report	Mohammed (yellow card) 19'; Belyayev 35'; Mirzov (yellow card) 69'; Đorđević (yellow card) 77'	Stadium: RZD Arena; Attendance: 12,257; Referee: Sergey Ivanov

9 November 2018 14	Arsenal Tula	2 – 0	Anzhi Makhachkala	Tula
19:30 MSK (UTC+3)	Tkachyov 25'; Bakayev 63'; Levashov (yellow card) 90'	Report	Chancellor (yellow card) 77'; Glebov (yellow card) 78'; Khamdamov (yellow card) 88'	Stadium: Arsenal Stadium; Attendance: 7,869; Referee: Vasiliy Kazartsev

25 November 2018 15	Krasnodar	3 – 0	Arsenal Tula	Krasnodar
16:30 MSK (UTC+3)	Wanderson 40'; Kaboré (yellow card) 41' (yellow-red card) 88'; Ignatyev 48'; Suleymanov 76'	Report	Đorđević (yellow card) 4'; Belyayev (yellow card) 45'; Bakayev (yellow card) 53'	Stadium: Krasnodar Stadium; Attendance: 16,628; Referee: Sergei Karasev

3 December 2018 16	Arsenal Tula	4 – 2	Zenit St.Petersburg	Tula
19:30 MSK (UTC+3)	Kangwa 6', 74'; Álvarez (yellow card) 21'; Mirzov 39' (yellow card) 41'; Bakayev 77'	Report	Kuzyayev 21' (yellow card) 53'; Paredes (yellow card) 41'; Hernani 57'; Dzyuba (yellow card) 71'; Anyukov (yellow card) 86'	Stadium: Arsenal Stadium; Attendance: 10,658; Referee: Aleksei Eskov

10 December 2018 17	Akhmat Grozny	2 – 0	Arsenal Tula	Grozny
19:30 MSK (UTC+3)	Semyonov (yellow card) 31'; Ravanelli 34' (yellow card) 65'; Ivanov (yellow card) 55'; Ismael (yellow card) 80'; Mbengue (yellow card) 86' (goal) 90+5'; Utsiyev (yellow card) 90+2'	Report	Kostadinov (yellow card) 4'; Bakayev (yellow card) 55'; Mirzov (yellow card) 60'; Mohammed (yellow card) 66'; Grigalava (yellow card) 76'; Gorbatenko (yellow card) 87'	Stadium: Akhmat-Arena; Attendance: 7,924; Referee: Mikhail Vilkov

2 March 2019 18	Arsenal Tula	2 – 0	CSKA Moscow	Grozny
14:00 MSK (UTC+3)	Đorđević 48' (yellow card) 69'; Kostadinov (yellow card) 52'; Bakayev (yellow card) 54'; Kangwa 88'; Mirzov (yellow card) 90+3'	Report	Nababkin (yellow card) 32'; Sigurðsson (yellow card) 44'; Akhmetov (yellow card) 55'	Stadium: Akhmat-Arena; Attendance: 1,850; Referee: Evgeny Turbin
Note: Match moved to the Akhmat-Arena in Grozny due to the poor condition of the Arsenal Stadium pitch.

10 March 2019 19	Rostov	0 – 0	Arsenal Tula	Rostov-on-Don
14:00 MSK (UTC+3)	Sigurðarson (yellow card) 21'; Eremenko (yellow card) 83'; Novoseltsev (yellow card) 90+1'	Report	Bakayev (yellow card) 66'	Stadium: Rostov Arena; Attendance: 1,850; Referee: Aleksey Sukhoy

16 March 2019 20	Arsenal Tula	2 – 0	Yenisey Krasnoyarsk	Tula
19:00 MSK (UTC+3)	Đorđević (yellow card) 9'; Mirzov 29'; Gorbatenko (yellow card) 58' (goal) 87'; Tkachyov (yellow card) 59'; Levashov (yellow card) 71'	Report	Savichev (yellow card) 17'; Yatchenko (yellow card) 69'	Stadium: Arsenal Stadium; Attendance: 8,957; Referee: Vasiliy Kazartsev

29 March 2019 21	Krylia Sovetov	0 – 1	Arsenal Tula	Samara
18:30 MSK (UTC+3)	Kornilenko (yellow card) 27'; Burlak (yellow card) 54'; Shishkin (yellow card) 80'; Samedov (yellow card) 82'	Report	Đorđević (yellow card) 2' (goal) 66'; Khagush (yellow card) 9'; Kombarov (yellow card) 17'; Tkachyov (yellow card) 54'; Gorbatenko (yellow card) 79'; Nigmatullin (yellow card) 89'	Stadium: Samara Arena; Attendance: 8,957; Referee: Aleksei Matyunin

7 April 2019 22	Rubin Kazan	0 – 0	Arsenal Tula	Kazan
16:30 MSK (UTC+3)	Mogilevets (yellow card) 44'; Kambolov (yellow card) 79'; Podberyozkin (yellow card) 90'	Report	Berkhamov (yellow card) 88'	Stadium: Kazan Arena; Attendance: 6,118; Referee: Mikhail Vilkov

13 April 2019 23	Arsenal Tula	0 – 0	Ural Yekaterinburg	Tula
14:00 MSK (UTC+3)	Gorbatenko (yellow card) 30'; Álvarez (yellow card) 90+1'	Report	Boumal (yellow card) 37'; Yegorychev (yellow card) 58'; Merkulov (red card) 76'; Pogrebnyak (yellow card) 83'; Haroyan (yellow card) 84'	Stadium: Arsenal Stadium; Attendance: 10,156; Referee: Vitali Meshkov

20 April 2019 24	Ufa	1 – 2	Arsenal Tula	Ufa
11:30 MSK (UTC+3)	Jokić (yellow card) 7'; Bezdenezhnykh (yellow card) 26'; Igboun 38'; Nedelcearu (yellow card) 63'; Sysuyev (yellow card) 83'	Report	Bakayev 3'; Gorbatenko 24'; Grigalava (yellow card) 47'; Berkhamov (yellow card) 70'	Stadium: Neftyanik Stadium; Referee: Vladimir Moskalyov

25 April 2019 25	Arsenal Tula	3 – 0	Spartak Moscow	Tula
20:30 MSK (UTC+3)	Kangwa 6'; Gorbatenko (yellow card) 22'; Tkachyov 24' (yellow card) 57'; Mirzov 37' (pen.); Kostadinov (yellow card) 60'	Report		Stadium: Arsenal Stadium; Attendance: 18,347; Referee: Mikhail Vilkov

29 April 2019 26	Orenburg	1 – 1	Arsenal Tula	Orenburg
17:00 MSK (UTC+3)	Afonin (yellow card) 15'; Malyarov (yellow card) 22'; Alves 78' (yellow card) 80'	Report	Mohammed (yellow card) 41'; Đorđević 62'; Mirzov (yellow card) 88'; Grigalava (yellow card) 90+1'	Stadium: Gazovik Stadium; Referee: Nikolay Voloshin

4 May 2019 27	Arsenal Tula	2 – 0	Lokomotiv Moscow	Tula
19:00 MSK (UTC+3)	Bakayev 24'; Kostadinov (yellow card) 48'; Đorđević 59'	Report	Eder (yellow card) 6'; Barinov (yellow card) 67'	Stadium: Arsenal Stadium; Attendance: 17,782; Referee: Evgeny Turbin

10 May 2019 28	Anzhi Makhachkala	0 – 1	Arsenal Tula	Kaspiysk
16:30 MSK (UTC+3)	Kaloshin (yellow card) 60'; Ivanchenko (yellow card) 90'	Report	Bakayev 34' (pen.); Kostadinov (yellow card) 70'; Ožegović (yellow card) 89'	Stadium: Anzhi Arena; Attendance: 2,530; Referee: Sergey Lapochkin

19 May 2019 29	Arsenal Tula	0 – 3	Krasnodar	Tula
16:30 MSK (UTC+3)	Kostadinov (yellow card) 67'	Report	Petrov 55'; Kaboré (yellow card) 59'; Spajić (yellow card) 60'; Pereyra 68'; Safonov (yellow card) 76'; Ari 82'	Stadium: Arsenal Stadium; Attendance: 14,470; Referee: Vitali Meshkov

26 May 2019 30	Dynamo Moscow	3 – 3	Arsenal Tula	Moscow
14:00 MSK (UTC+3)	Cardoso 2'; Yusupov (yellow card) 16'; Panchenko 29', 60'; Tetteh (yellow card) 31'; Morozov (yellow card) 45'	Report	Grigalava 16'; Kostadinov (yellow card) 47'; Kombarov (yellow card) 48'; Mirzov 52' (pen.) (yellow card) 63'; Gorbatenko 84'	Stadium: VTB Arena; Attendance: 23,340; Referee: Vladislav Bezborodov

==== League table ====
Pos	Team	Pld	W	D	L	GF	GA	GD	Pts	Qualification or relegation
4	CSKA Moscow	30	14	9	7	46	23	+23	51	Qualification for the Europa League group stage (Note: Lokomotiv Moscow won the 2018–19 Russian Cup. As they already qualified for the Champions League, the Europa League group stage spot (originally designated for the Cup winner) goes to the fourth-placed team, third qualifying round spot goes to fifth-placed team and second qualifying round spot goes to sixth-placed team.)
5	Spartak Moscow	30	14	7	9	36	31	+5	49	Qualification for the Europa League third qualifying round
6	Arsenal Tula	30	12	10	8	40	33	+7	46	Qualification for the Europa League second qualifying round
7	Orenburg	30	12	7	11	39	34	+5	43	
8	Akhmat Grozny	30	11	9	10	29	30	−1	42	

Updated to match(es) played on 26 May 2019. Source: Russian Premier League, Soccerway
Rules for classification: 1) Points; 2) Head-to-head points; 3) Head-to-head matches won; 4) Head-to-head goal difference; 5) Head-to-head goals scored; 6) Head-to-head away goals; 7) Matches won; 8) Goal difference; 9) Goals scored; 10) Away goals scored; 11) Play-off.

=== Russian Cup ===
26 September 2018 Round of 32	Sakhalin Yuzhno-Sakhalinsk	1 – 2	Arsenal Tula	Tomsk
11:00 MSK (UTC+3)	Gagloyev (yellow card) 11' (goal) 70'; Alakhverdov (yellow card) 90+1'	Report	Kombarov (yellow card) 6'; Mohammed 10' (yellow card) 58'; Denisov 29'	Stadium: Temp Stadium; Attendance: 500; Referee: Pavel Shadykhanov

31 October 2018 Round of 16	Akhmat Grozny	0 – 2	Arsenal Tula	Grozny
19:30 MSK (UTC+3)	Gashchenkov (yellow card) 23'; Ismael (yellow card) 31'; Semyonov (yellow card) 90+1'	Report	Đorđević 16'; Kostadinov (yellow card) 43'; Mirzov 70'	Stadium: Akhmat-Arena; Attendance: 9,328; Referee: Kirill Levnikov

28 November 2018 Quarterfinal 1st leg	Orenburg	2 – 4	Arsenal Tula	Orenburg
16:00 MSK (UTC+3)	Sutormin (yellow card) 18'; Begić 41' (yellow card) 90'; Despotović 79'; Terekhov (yellow card) 90+2'	Report	Kangwa 7', 21'; Ožegović (yellow card) 30'; Kombarov 62'; Levashov (yellow card) 90+4'; Đorđević 90+5'	Stadium: Gazovik Stadium; Attendance: 1,615; Referee: Aleksei Matyunin

6 March 2019 Quarterfinal 2nd leg	Arsenal Tula	1 – 1 (5 – 3 agg.)	Orenburg	Khimki
19:00 MSK (UTC+3)	Kombarov (yellow card) 39'; Grigalava 54'	Report	Begić (yellow card) 51'; Malyarov (yellow card) 70'; Popović 86' (pen.)	Stadium: Arena Khimki; Attendance: 740; Referee: Aleksey Eskov

3 April 2019 Semifinal 1st leg	Ural Yekaterinburg	1 – 0	Arsenal Tula	Yekaterinburg
17:00 MSK (UTC+3)	Panyukov 17'; Boumal (red card) 61'; Palyakow (yellow card) 83'; Strandberg (yellow card) 85'	Report	Mohammed (yellow card) 44'; Grigalava (red card) 85'; Berkhamov (yellow card) 90'	Stadium: Central Stadium; Attendance: 12,304; Referee: Aleksei Eskov

15 May 2019 Semifinal 2nd leg	Arsenal Tula	2 – 2 (2 – 3 agg.)	Ural Yekaterinburg	Tula
19:00 MSK (UTC+3)	Belyayev (yellow card) 23'; Gorbatenko (yellow card) 45+4'; Haroyan 58' (o.g.); Mirzov 67'; Álvarez (yellow card) 90+2'	Report	Bicfalvi 1' (red card) 34'; El Kabir (penalty missed) 24' 24'; Aratore (yellow card) 45+4'; Yemelyanov (yellow card) 62'	Stadium: Arsenal Stadium; Attendance: 12,850; Referee: Sergei Karasev

== Squad statistics ==
As of match played 26 May 2019

=== Appearances and goals ===
No.	Pos	Nat	Player	Total		Premier League		Russian Cup	
No.	Pos	Nat	Player	Apps	Goals	Apps	Goals	Apps	Goals
1	GK	(Russia) RUS	Artur Nigmatullin	19	0	15+1	0	3	0
5	DF	(Ghana) GHA	Abdul Kadiri Mohammed	27	2	20+2	1	5	1
6	DF	(Russia) RUS	Maksim Belyayev	34	1	28	1	6	0
7	MF	(Russia) RUS	Kantemir Berkhamov	18	0	12+4	0	0+2	0
8	DF	(Georgia (country)) GEO	Gia Grigalava	30	2	26	1	4	1
9	DF	(Russia) RUS	Kirill Kombarov	26	1	21+1	0	4	1
10	FW	(Zambia) ZAM	Evans Kangwa	29	6	15+10	4	3+1	2
11	MF	(Russia) RUS	Sergei Tkachyov	30	5	20+6	5	4	0
13	DF	(Belarus) BLR	Maksim Valadzko	2	0	1+1	0	0	0
14	DF	(Russia) RUS	Anri Khagush	24	0	16+5	0	3	0
17	FW	(Russia) RUS	Guram Adzhoyev	7	0	0+5	0	0+2	0
18	FW	(Montenegro) MNE	Luka Đorđević	27	9	23	7	3+1	2
19	MF	(Russia) RUS	Reziuan Mirzov	29	8	18+5	6	5+1	2
21	DF	(Spain) ESP	Víctor Álvarez	28	0	22+1	0	5	0
22	FW	(Russia) RUS	Daniil Lesovoy	17	2	3+10	2	2+2	0
23	MF	(Russia) RUS	Igor Gorbatenko	34	3	22+6	3	5+1	0
26	DF	(Burkina Faso) BFA	Bakary Koné	2	0	1	0	1	0
36	GK	(Russia) RUS	Mikhail Levashov	18	0	15	0	3	0
45	FW	(Serbia) SRB	Ognjen Ožegović	11	1	3+5	1	1+2	0
70	MF	(Bulgaria) BUL	Georgi Kostadinov	32	1	20+7	1	4+1	0
71	DF	(Russia) RUS	Aleksandr Denisov	7	1	4+1	0	1+1	1
77	MF	(Bulgaria) BUL	Mihail Aleksandrov	1	0	1	0	0	0
78	MF	(Russia) RUS	Zelimkhan Bakayev	29	8	21+4	8	4	0
80	MF	(Russia) RUS	Yaroslav Ivakin	3	0	0+2	0	0+1	0
82	MF	(Russia) RUS	Daniil Khlusevich	1	0	0	0	0+1	0
Players away from the club on loan:
Players who left Arsenal Tula during the season:
20	MF	(Serbia) SRB	Goran Čaušić	5	0	4+1	0	0	0

=== Goal scorers ===
Place	Position	Nation	Number	Name	Premier League	Russian Cup	Total
1	FW	(Montenegro)	18	Luka Đorđević	7	2	9
2	FW	(Russia)	78	Zelimkhan Bakayev	8	0	8
2	MF	(Russia)	19	Reziuan Mirzov	7	1	8
4	FW	(Zambia)	10	Evans Kangwa	4	2	6
5	MF	(Russia)	11	Sergei Tkachyov	5	0	5
6	MF	(Russia)	23	Igor Gorbatenko	3	0	3
7	FW	(Russia)	22	Daniil Lesovoy	2	0	2
7	DF	(Ghana)	5	Abdul Kadiri Mohammed	1	1	2
7	DF	(Georgia (country))	8	Gia Grigalava	1	1	2
9	MF	(Bulgaria)	70	Georgi Kostadinov	1	0	1
9	FW	(Serbia)	45	Ognjen Ožegović	1	0	1
9	DF	(Russia)	6	Maksim Belyayev	1	0	1
9	DF	(Russia)	71	Aleksandr Denisov	0	1	1
9	DF	(Russia)	9	Kirill Kombarov	0	1	1
9				Own goal	0	1	1
				TOTALS	40	11	51

=== Disciplinary record ===
Number	Nation	Position	Name	Premier League		Russian Cup		Total	
Number	Nation	Position	Name	Yellow card	Red card	Yellow card	Red card	Yellow card	Red card
1	(Russia)	GK	Artur Nigmatullin	1	0	0	0	1	0
5	(Ghana)	DF	Abdul Kadiri Mohammed	4	0	2	0	6	0
6	(Russia)	DF	Maksim Belyayev	2	0	1	0	3	0
7	(Russia)	MF	Kantemir Berkhamov	7	1	1	0	8	1
8	(Georgia (country))	DF	Gia Grigalava	5	1	0	1	5	2
9	(Russia)	DF	Kirill Kombarov	2	0	2	0	4	0
11	(Russia)	MF	Sergei Tkachyov	4	0	0	0	4	0
14	(Russia)	DF	Anri Khagush	3	0	0	0	3	0
18	(Montenegro)	FW	Luka Đorđević	6	0	0	0	6	0
19	(Russia)	MF	Reziuan Mirzov	6	0	0	0	6	0
21	(Spain)	DF	Víctor Álvarez	2	0	1	0	3	0
22	(Russia)	FW	Daniil Lesovoy	1	0	0	0	1	0
23	(Russia)	MF	Igor Gorbatenko	6	0	1	0	7	0
36	(Russia)	GK	Mikhail Levashov	2	0	1	0	3	0
45	(Serbia)	FW	Ognjen Ožegović	2	0	1	0	3	0
70	(Bulgaria)	MF	Georgi Kostadinov	8	0	1	0	9	0
71	(Russia)	DF	Aleksandr Denisov	2	0	0	0	2	0
78	(Russia)	MF	Zelimkhan Bakayev	4	0	0	0	4	0
Players who left Arsenal Tula during the season:
20	(Serbia)	MF	Goran Čaušić	1	0	0	0	1	0
			TOTALS	68	2	11	1	79	3
