= Guram Adzhoyev =

Guram Adzhoyev may refer to:

- Guram Adzhoyev (footballer, born 1961), Russian football player
- Guram Adzhoyev (footballer, born 1995), Russian football player
