= Mikhail Levashov (footballer) =

Russian footballer

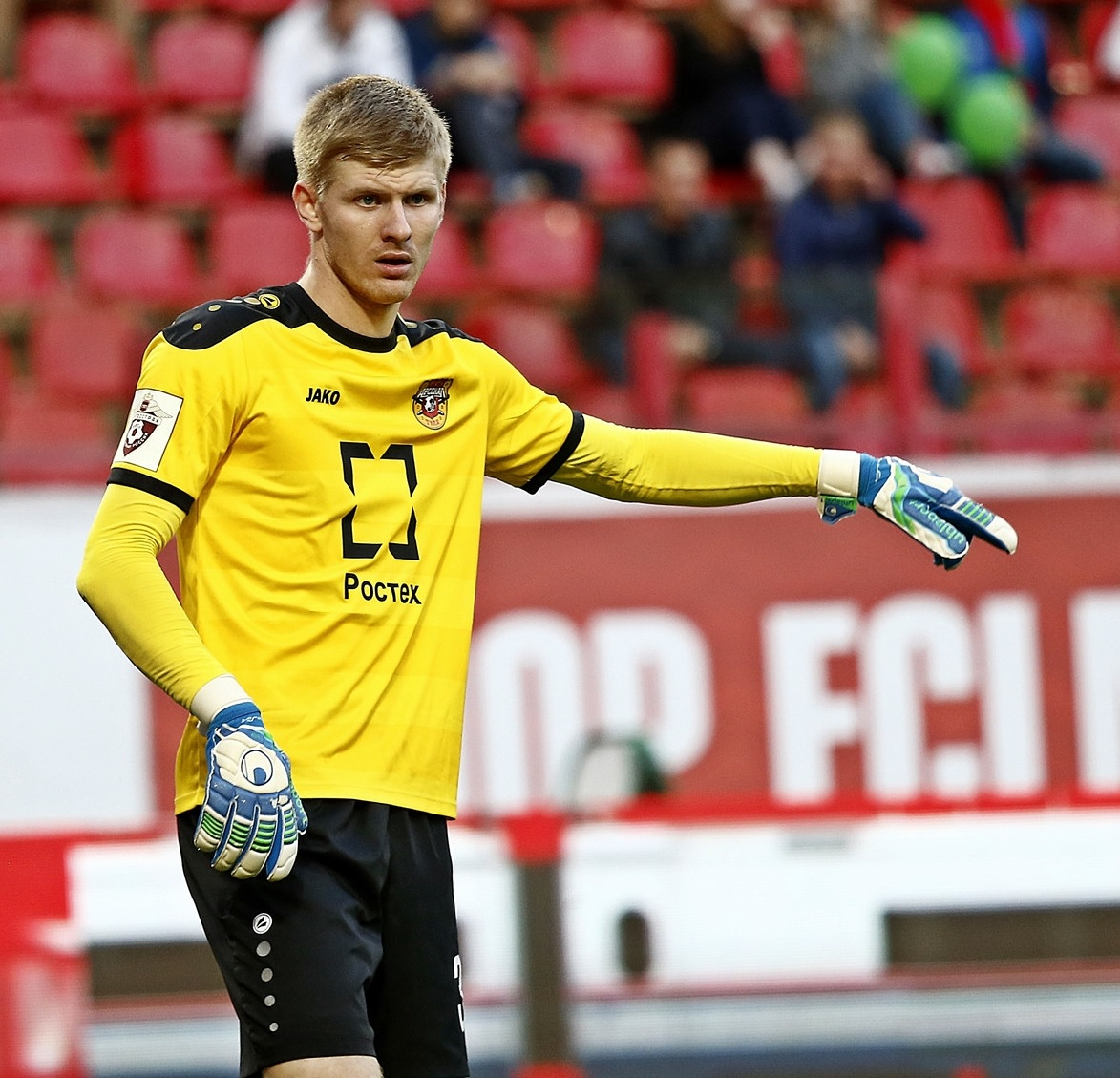
- Levashov with Arsenal Tula in 2016

Personal information
- Full name: Mikhail Alekseyevich Levashov
- Date of birth: 4 October 1991 (age 35)
- Place of birth: Bogoroditsk, Russian SFSR
- Height: 1.93 m (6 ft 4 in)
- Position: Goalkeeper

Team information
- Current team: FC Arsenal Tula; FC Arsenal-2 Tula
- Number: 36

Youth career
- FC Krasnodar-2000

Senior career*
Years	Team	Apps	(Gls)
2008	FC Don Novomoskovsk (amateur)		
2009–2010	FC Volga-d Nizhny Novgorod		
2010	FC Volga Nizhny Novgorod	0	(0)
2011–2012	FC Shakhtyor Peshelan		
2012–2016	FC Arsenal-2 Tula	29	(0)
2014–2025	FC Arsenal Tula	106	(0)
2025	→ FC Sokol Saratov (loan)	2	(0)
2025–2026	FC Sokol Saratov	14	(0)
2026–	FC Arsenal Tula	1	(0)
2026–	FC Arsenal-2 Tula	1	(0)
- * Club domestic league appearances and goals as of 31 October 2026

Mikhail Alekseyevich Levashov (Russian: Михаил Алексеевич Левашов; born 4 October 1991) is a Russian football player who plays as a goalkeeper for FC Arsenal Tula and FC Arsenal-2 Tula.

== Club career ==
He made his professional debut in the Russian Professional Football League for FC Arsenal-2 Tula on 12 July 2014 in a game against FC Avangard Kursk.

He made his Russian Premier League debut for FC Arsenal Tula in a game against FC Tom Tomsk on 17 September 2016.

== Career statistics ==
=== Club ===
As of 21 May 2022

Club	Season	League			Cup		Continental		Total	
Club	Season	Division	Apps	Goals	Apps	Goals	Apps	Goals	Apps	Goals
Volga Nizhny Novgorod	2010	FNL	0	0	0	0	–		0	0
Arsenal-2 Tula	2014–15	PFL	20	0	–		–		20	0
Arsenal-2 Tula	2015–16	PFL	9	0	–		–		9	0
Arsenal-2 Tula	Total		29	0	0	0	0	0	29	0
Arsenal Tula	2016–17	RPL	12	0	1	0	–		13	0
Arsenal Tula	2017–18	RPL	9	0	1	0	–		10	0
Arsenal Tula	2018–19	RPL	15	0	3	0	–		18	0
Arsenal Tula	2019–20	RPL	18	0	0	0	2 (Note: Appearances in the UEFA Europa League)	0	20	0
Arsenal Tula	2020–21	RPL	3	0	0	0	–		3	0
Arsenal Tula	2021–22	RPL	10	0	0	0	–		10	0
Arsenal Tula	Total		67	0	5	0	2	0	74	0
Career total			96	0	5	0	2	0	103	0
