= Maksim Belyayev (footballer) =

Russian professional footballer

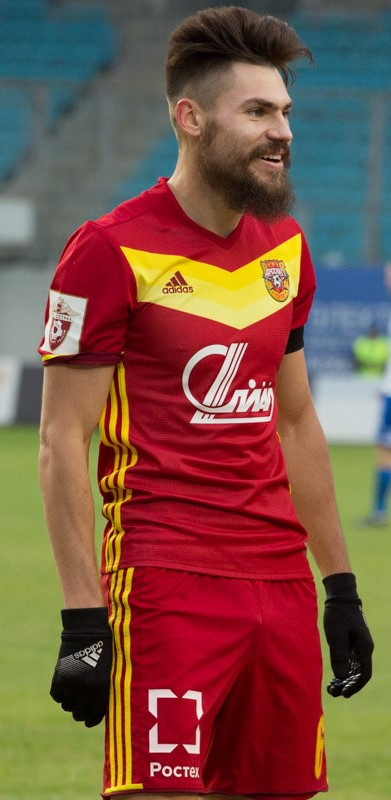
- Belyayev with Arsenal Tula in 2018

Personal information
- Full name: Maksim Aleksandrovich Belyayev
- Date of birth: 30 September 1991 (age 35)
- Place of birth: Ozyory, Moscow Oblast, Russia
- Height: 1.88 m (6 ft 2 in)
- Position: Defender

Youth career
- 1999–2005: Spartak Moscow
- 2005–2009: Lokomotiv Moscow

Senior career*
Years	Team	Apps	(Gls)
2009–2015	Lokomotiv Moscow	12	(1)
2011	→ Dynamo Bryansk (loan)	10	(0)
2011	→ Torpedo Vladimir (loan)	14	(4)
2013	→ FC Rostov (loan)	5	(0)
2015	Shinnik Yaroslavl	16	(0)
2016–2023	Arsenal Tula	153	(4)
2023–2025	Leningradets	41	(0)

International career^{‡}
2010	Russia U-19	4	(0)
2012–2013	Russia U-21	10	(0)
2019	Russia	1	(0)
- * Club domestic league appearances and goals as of 14 June 2025 ‡ National team caps and goals as of 19 November 2019

Maksim Aleksandrovich Belyayev (Russian: Максим Александрович Беляев; born 30 September 1991) is a Russian former professional footballer.

== Club career ==
He made his debut in the Russian Premier League for FC Lokomotiv Moscow on 19 July 2009 when he replaced Dmitry Sennikov during the game against FC Amkar Perm.

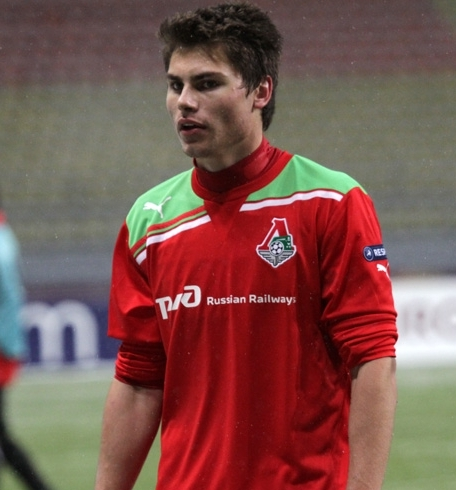
Belyayev with Lokomotiv Moscow in 2012

After leaving Arsenal Tula as a free agent at the end of the 2020–21 season and missing the first 6 games of the 2021–22 Russian Premier League, he returned to Arsenal on 6 September 2021 and signed a new two-year contract with the club.

== International ==
On 11 March 2019, he was called up to the Russia national football team for the Euro 2020 qualifiers against Belgium on 21 March 2019 and Kazakhstan on 24 March 2019.

He made his debut for the team on 19 November 2019 in a UEFA Euro 2020 qualifier against San Marino.

== Career statistics ==
=== Club ===
As of 21 May 2022

Club	Season	League			Cup		Continental		Other		Total	
Club	Season	Division	Apps	Goals	Apps	Goals	Apps	Goals	Apps	Goals	Apps	Goals
Lokomotiv Moscow	2009	RPL	1	0	1	0	–		–		2	0
Lokomotiv Moscow	2010	RPL	0	0	0	0	0	0	–		0	0
Lokomotiv Moscow	2011–12	RPL	10	1	0	0	2 (Note: Appearances in the UEFA Europa League)	0	–		12	1
Lokomotiv Moscow	2012–13	RPL	1	0	1	0	–		–		2	0
Lokomotiv Moscow	2013–14	RPL	0	0	0	0	–		–		0	0
Lokomotiv Moscow	2014–15	RPL	0	0	0	0	0	0	–		0	0
Lokomotiv Moscow	Total		12	1	2	0	2	0	0	0	16	1
Dynamo Bryansk (loan)	2011–12	FNL	10	0	–		–		–		10	0
Torpedo Vladimir (loan)	2011–12	FNL	14	4	1	0	–		–		15	4
Rostov (loan)	2012–13	RPL	5	0	2	0	–		–		7	0
Shinnik Yaroslavl	2015–16	FNL	16	0	2	0	–		2 (Note: Appearances in the FNL Cup)	0	20	0
Arsenal Tula	2015–16	FNL	14	1	–		–		1	0	15	1
Arsenal Tula	2016–17	RPL	27	1	1	0	–		2 (Note: Appearances in the relegation play-offs)	0	30	1
Arsenal Tula	2017–18	RPL	27	1	1	0	–		–		28	1
Arsenal Tula	2018–19	RPL	28	1	6	0	–		–		34	1
Arsenal Tula	2019–20	RPL	29	0	2	1	2	0	–		33	1
Arsenal Tula	2020–21	RPL	16	0	0	0	–		–		16	0
Arsenal Tula	2021–22	RPL	12	0	2	0	–		–		14	0
Arsenal Tula	Total		153	4	12	1	2	0	3	0	170	5
Career total			210	9	19	1	4	0	5	0	238	10
