= Moussa Doumbia (footballer, born 1994) =

Malian footballer (born 1994)

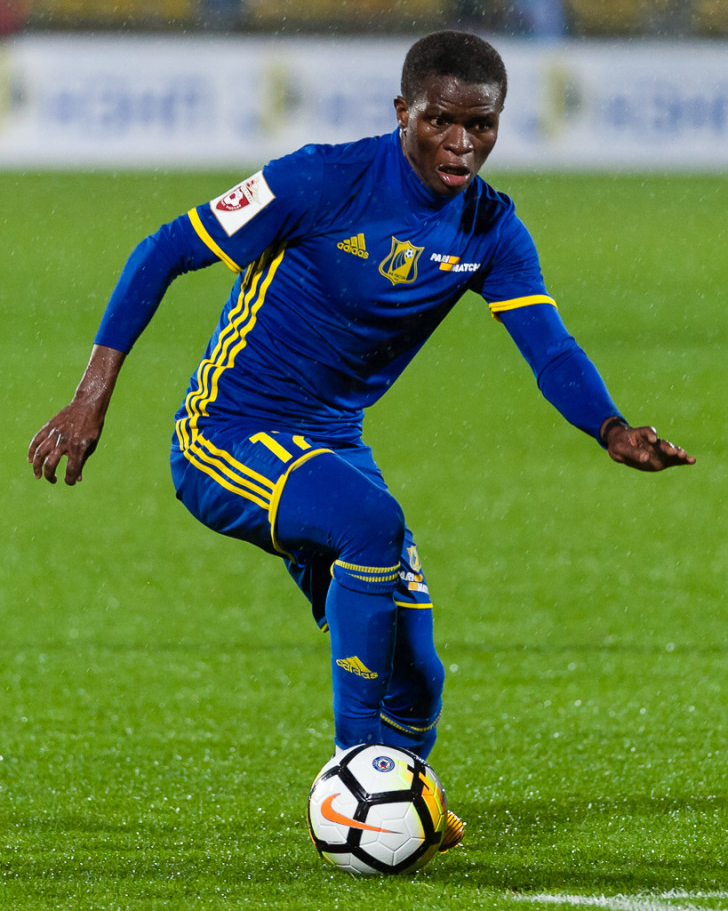
- Doumbia with FC Rostov in 2017

Personal information
- Date of birth: 15 August 1994 (age 32)
- Place of birth: Bouaké, Ivory Coast
- Height: 1.73 m (5 ft 8 in)
- Position: Midfielder

Senior career*
Years	Team	Apps	(Gls)
2012–2014	Real Bamako		
2014–2018	Rostov	55	(3)
2017	→ Arsenal Tula (loan)	12	(1)
2018–2022	Reims	78	(5)
2022–2023	Sochaux	34	(11)
2023–2024	Al-Adalah	24	(4)
2025	Sochaux	8	(0)

International career^{‡}
2014–	Mali	43	(6)
- * Club domestic league appearances and goals as of 26 May 2025 ‡ National team caps and goals as of 23:23, 24 November 2023 (UTC)

Moussa Doumbia (born 15 August 1994) is a professional footballer who plays as an attacking midfielder and left winger. Born in Ivory Coast, he plays for the Mali national team.

== Club career ==
On 16 June 2014, Doumbia signed a four-year contract with Rostov of the Russian Premier League. His previous team AS Real Bamako, and was a free agent before sigining for Rostov.

On 25 February 2017, Doumbia signed for Arsenal Tula on loan for the rest of the 2016–17 season.

On 27 June 2018, he signed a four-year contract with French club Reims.

On 29 June 2022, Doumbia joined Sochaux on a three-year deal. This was seen as his best spell of his senior career, scoring 11 goals in 34 appearances. Shortly after a single season at Sochaux, he joined Saudi Arabian club Al-Adalah., on 3 August 2023.

On 1 February 2025, Doumbia returned to Sochaux, signing on for the remainder of the 2024–25 season.

== International career ==
Doumbia made his debut for Mali on 29 June 2014 in a 3–1 victory over China in Shenzhen.

In a match against Ivory Coast in October 2016, Doumbia lost consciousness following a collision with an Ivorian player. Serge Aurier, player of the Ivory Coast national team, helped save Doumbia's life by putting two fingers inside his mouth as a makeshift tracheal tube to keep his airways open, preventing him from suffocating.

== Career statistics ==
=== Club ===
As of match played 21 February 2025

Appearances and goals by club, season and competition
Club	Season	League			National Cup		League Cup		Continental		Other		Total	
Club	Season	Division	Apps	Goals	Apps	Goals	Apps	Goals	Apps	Goals	Apps	Goals	Apps	Goals
Real Bamako	2013–14	Malian Première Division					–		4	1	–		4	1
Rostov	2014–15	Russian Premier League	19	0	1	0	–		2 (Note: Appearances in UEFA Europa League)	0	1 (Note: Appearance in Russian Super Cup)	0	23	0
Rostov	2015–16	Russian Premier League	12	3	0	0	–		–		–		12	3
Rostov	2016–17	Russian Premier League	6	0	0	0	–		5	0	–		11	0
Rostov	2017–18	Russian Premier League	18	0	2	0	–		–		–		20	0
Rostov	Total		55	3	3	0	–		7	0	1	0	66	3
Arsenal Tula (loan)	2016–17	Russian Premier League	12	1	0	0	–		–		1	0	13	1
Reims	2018–19	Ligue 1	28	3	0	0	1	0	–		–		29	3
Reims	2019–20	Ligue 1	26	2	1	0	4	1	–		–		31	3
Reims	2020–21	Ligue 1	23	0	1	0	–		–		–		24	0
Reims	2021–22	Ligue 1	4	0	0	0	–		–		–		4	0
Reims	Total		84	5	2	0	5	1	–		–		88	6
Reims B	2020–21	CFA 2	1	0	–		–		–		–		1	0
Sochaux	2022–23	Ligue 2	34	11	1	2	–		–		–		35	13
Al-Adalah	2023–24	Saudi Pro League	24	4	1	0	–		–		–		25	4
Sochaux	2024–25	CFA	2	0	–		–		–		–		2	0
Career total			209	24	7	2	5	1	11	1	2	0	234	28

=== International ===
As of match played 20 November 2023

Appearances and goals by national team and year
National team	Year	Apps	Goals
Mali	2014	1	0
Mali	2015	0	0
Mali	2016	5	2
Mali	2017	7	0
Mali	2018	2	1
Mali	2019	7	0
Mali	2020	2	1
Mali	2021	8	1
Mali	2022	6	0
Mali	2023	5	1
Total		43	6

As of match played 17 October 2023
Scores and results list Mali's goal tally first, score column indicates score after each Doumbia goal.

List of international goals scored by Moussa Doumbia
No.	Date	Venue	Cap	Opponent	Score	Result	Competition
1	4 June 2016	Juba Stadium, Juba, South Sudan	3	South Sudan	3–0	3–0	2017 Africa Cup of Nations qualification
2	4 September 2016	Stade du 26 Mars, Bamako, Mali	4	Benin	5–1	5–2	2017 Africa Cup of Nations qualification
3	17 November 2018	Stade d'Angondjé, Libreville, Gabon	15	Gabon	1–0	1–0	2019 Africa Cup of Nations qualification
4	17 November 2020	Sam Nujoma Stadium, Windhoek, Namibia	24	Namibia	2–0	2–1	2021 Africa Cup of Nations qualification
5	7 October 2021	Adrar Stadium, Souss-Massa, Morocco	29	Kenya	5–0	5–0	2022 FIFA World Cup qualification
6	17 October 2023	Estádio Municipal de Portimão, Portimão, Portugal	41	Saudi Arabia	1–0	3–1	Friendly
