= Federico Rasic =

Argentine footballer

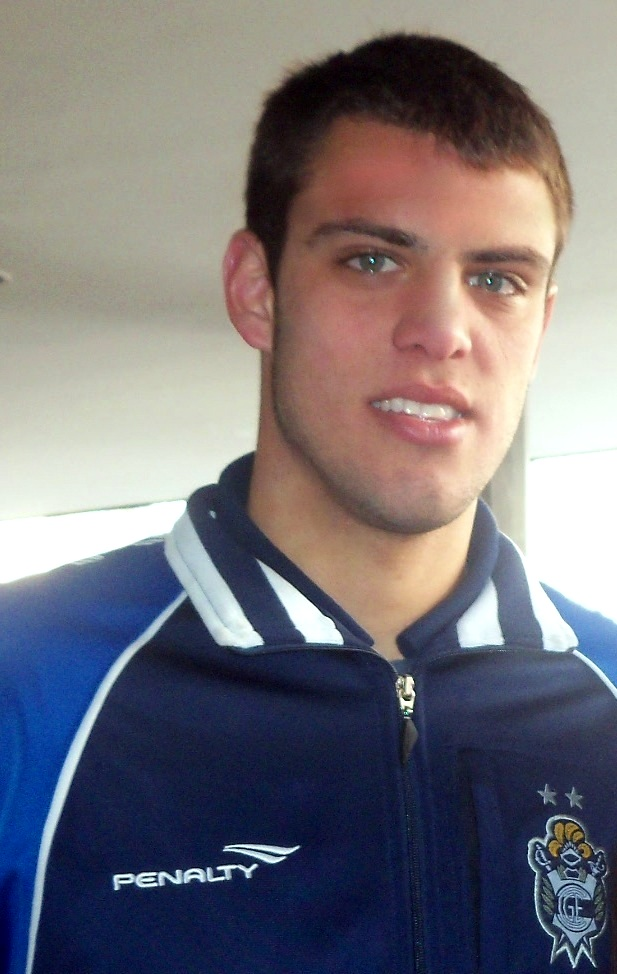
- Rasic in 2012

Personal information
- Full name: Federico Iván Rasic
- Date of birth: 24 March 1992 (age 34)
- Place of birth: Mar del Plata, Argentina
- Height: 1.96 m (6 ft 5 in)
- Position: Forward

Team information
- Current team: FC Paradiso
- Number: 10

Youth career
- Gimnasia y Esgrima

Senior career*
Years	Team	Apps	(Gls)
2012–2017	Gimnasia y Esgrima	30	(6)
2014	→ Amkar Perm (loan)	0	(0)
2014–2015	→ Arsenal de Sarandí (loan)	20	(3)
2017–2018	Arsenal Tula	30	(6)
2018–2020	Pafos	30	(4)
2021	Sona Calcio	11	(2)
2021–2022	Karmiotissa Polemidion		
2022–2023	Club General Caballero JLM	9	(0)
2023-2024	Chacarita Juniors	13	(0)
2024–2025	Deportivo Maipú	28	(5)
2025–	FC Paradiso	29	(14)
- * Club domestic league appearances and goals as of 1 October 2026

Federico Iván "Fede" Rasic (Spanish pronunciation: [feðeˈɾikojˈβaɱ ˈfeðe raˈsik]; Croatian: Rašić, pronounced [rǎːʃitɕ]; born 24 March 1992) is an Argentine footballer who plays as a forward for Swiss club FC Paradiso. He also holds Croatian citizenship. He has been called up for the Croatia national football team.

== Club career ==
In December 2013, Rasic attracted interest from Spartak Moscow and Dynamo Kyiv, before signing a six-month loan deal with Amkar Perm, with the option to make it permanent. Rasic failed to make an appearance for Amkar Perm and returned to Gimnasia y Esgrima upon its expiration.

At the beginning of August 2014, Rasic was joined Arsenal de Sarandí on loan for 18-months.

On 19 January 2017, he signed a contract with the Russian Premier League club FC Arsenal Tula.

== Career statistics ==
=== Club ===
As of match played 27 October 2019

Appearances and goals by club, season and competition
Club	Season	League			National Cup		Continental		Other		Total	
Club	Season	Division	Apps	Goals	Apps	Goals	Apps	Goals	Apps	Goals	Apps	Goals
Gimnasia y Esgrima	2011–12	Primera B Nacional	2	1	0	0	—		—		2	1
Gimnasia y Esgrima	2012–13	Primera B Nacional	4	2	0	0	—		—		4	2
Gimnasia y Esgrima	2013–14	Superliga Argentina	13	3	0	0	—		—		13	3
Gimnasia y Esgrima	2014	Superliga Argentina	0	0	0	0	—		—		0	0
Gimnasia y Esgrima	2015	Superliga Argentina	0	0	0	0	—		—		0	0
Gimnasia y Esgrima	2016	Superliga Argentina	9	0	1	0	—		—		10	0
Gimnasia y Esgrima	2016–17	Superliga Argentina	2	0	0	0	—		—		2	0
Gimnasia y Esgrima	Total		30	6	1	0	—		—		31	6
Amkar Perm (loan)	2013–14	Russian Premier League	0	0	0	0	—		—		0	0
Arsenal (loan)	2014	Superliga Argentina	6	0	0	0	—		—		6	0
Arsenal (loan)	2015	Superliga Argentina	14	3	0	0	1	0	—		15	3
Arsenal (loan)	Total		20	3	0	0	1	0	—		21	3
Arsenal Tula	2016–17	Russian Premier League	12	6	0	0	—		1	0	13	6
Arsenal Tula	2017–18	Russian Premier League	18	0	1	0	—		—		19	0
Arsenal Tula	Total		30	6	1	0	—		1	0	32	6
Pafos	2018–19	Cypriot First Division	26	3	4	5	—		—		30	8
Pafos	2019–20	Cypriot First Division	4	1	0	0	—		—		4	1
Pafos	Total		30	4	4	5	—		—		34	9
Career total			110	19	6	5	1	0	1	0	118	24
