= Sergei Shapovalov =

Russian footballer

Personal information
- Full name: Sergei Sergeyevich Shapovalov
- Date of birth: 14 February 1995 (age 31)
- Place of birth: Dalnerechensk, Russia
- Height: 1.79 m (5 ft 10 1/2 in)
- Positions: Forward; midfielder

Youth career
- FC Luch-Energiya Vladivostok

Senior career*
Years	Team	Apps	(Gls)
2012–2013	FC Luch-Energiya Vladivostok	3	(0)
2014	FC Sibir-2 Novosibirsk	7	(1)
2014–2015	FC Smena Komsomolsk-na-Amure	16	(1)
2016	FC Dynamo Kirov	8	(1)
2016	FC Arsenal Tula	0	(0)
2016	FC Arsenal-2 Tula	6	(0)
- * Club domestic league appearances and goals

Sergei Sergeyevich Shapovalov (Russian: Серге́й Серге́евич Шаповалов; born 14 February 1995) is a former Russian professional football player.

== Club career ==
He made his Russian Football National League debut for FC Luch-Energiya Vladivostok on 27 May 2012 in a game against FC Fakel Voronezh.
