= Aleksandr Gorbatyuk =

Russian footballer

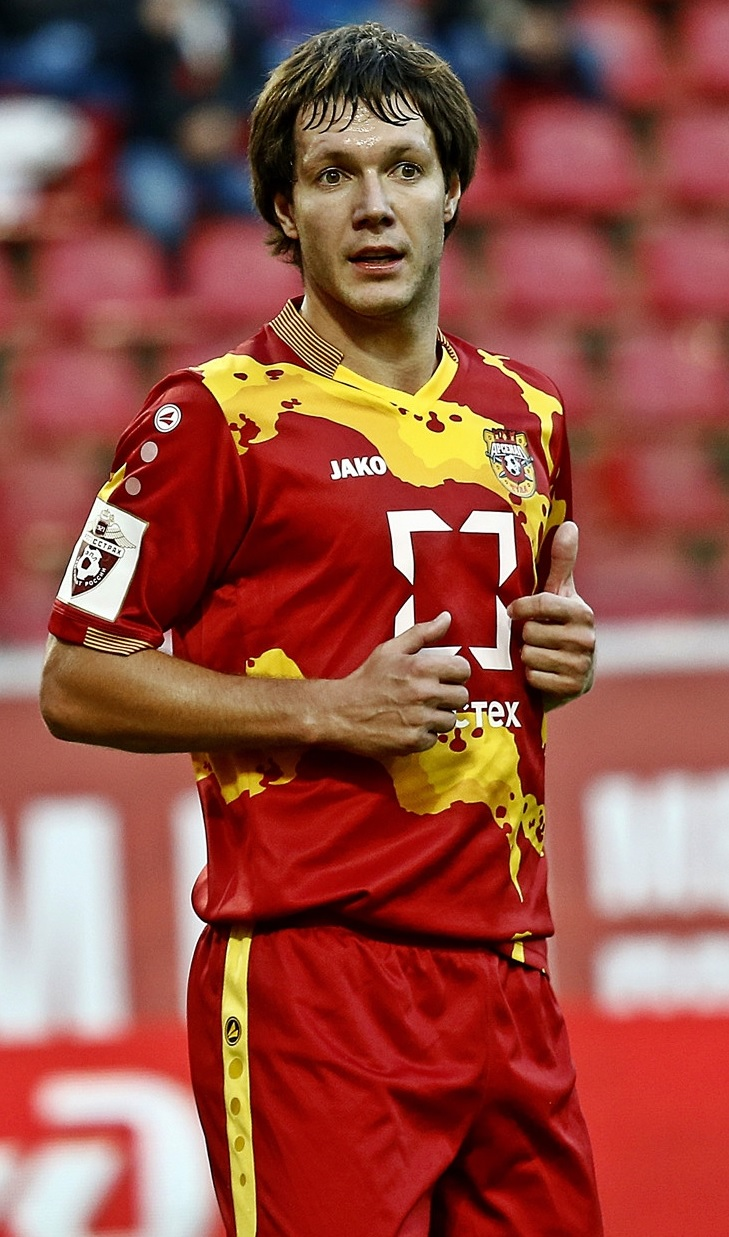
- Gorbatyuk with Arsenal Tula in 2016

Personal information
- Full name: Aleksandr Yuryevich Gorbatyuk
- Date of birth: 21 April 1985 (age 41)
- Place of birth: Seversk, Tomsk Oblast, Russian SFSR
- Height: 1.86 m (6 ft 1 in)
- Positions: Defender; midfielder

Senior career*
Years	Team	Apps	(Gls)
2002–2003	FC Chkalovets-Olimpik Novosibirsk	44	(1)
2005	FC Chkalovets Novosibirsk	8	(1)
2006	FC Neftekhimik Nizhnekamsk	25	(0)
2007–2010	FC SKA-Energiya Khabarovsk	19	(0)
2008–2010	→ FC Smena Komsomolsk-na-Amure (loan)	67	(9)
2011–2012	FC Salyut Belgorod	38	(2)
2012–2016	FC Sokol Saratov	123	(8)
2016	FC Arsenal Tula	16	(0)
2017–2019	FC Tambov	70	(5)
2019–2020	FC Tom Tomsk	14	(1)
2020–2021	FC Kuban Krasnodar	17	(1)
- * Club domestic league appearances and goals

Aleksandr Yuryevich Gorbatyuk (Russian: Александр Юрьевич Горбатюк; born 21 April 1985) is a Russian former professional football player.

== Club career ==
He made his Russian Premier League debut for FC Arsenal Tula on 6 August 2016 in a game against FC Rubin Kazan.
