= Dmitri Shilov =

Russian footballer

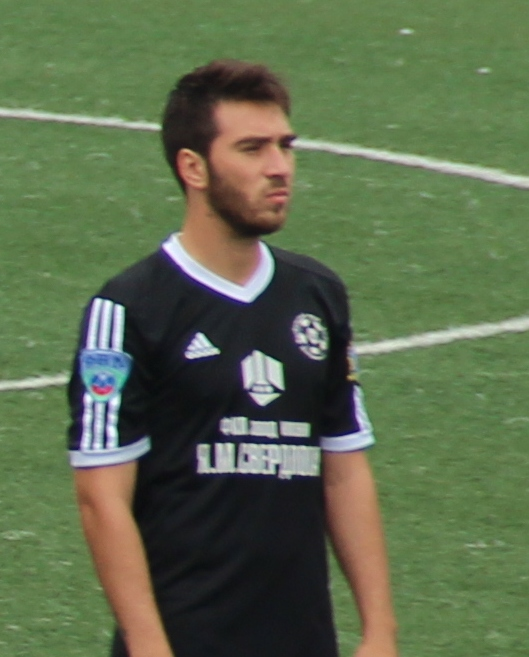
- Shilov in 2014

Personal information
- Full name: Dmitri Vyacheslavovich Shilov
- Date of birth: 30 January 1991 (age 35)
- Place of birth: Tula, Russian SFSR
- Height: 1.79 m (5 ft 10 in)
- Position: Left-back

Team information
- Current team: Salyut Belgorod
- Number: 19

Senior career*
Years	Team	Apps	(Gls)
2011	Znamya Truda	5	(0)
2012–2015	Arsenal Tula	38	(6)
2014–2015	→ Khimik Dzerzhinsk (loan)	25	(1)
2015–2016	Arsenal-2 Tula	28	(4)
2017–2020	Tekstilshchik Ivanovo	73	(3)
2020	Luki-Energiya	8	(0)
2021	Krasny	11	(0)
2021–2022	Shinnik Yaroslavl	22	(1)
2022–2024	Tekstilshchik Ivanovo	39	(2)
2024–	Salyut Belgorod	55	(5)
- * Club domestic league appearances and goals as of 31 October 2026

Dmitri Vyacheslavovich Shilov (Russian: Дмитрий Вячеславович Шилов; born 30 January 1991) is a Russian professional football player who plays for Salyut Belgorod.

== Club career ==
He made his Russian Football National League debut for Arsenal Tula on 7 July 2013 in a game against Dynamo St. Petersburg.
