= Guram Adzhoyev (footballer, born 1995) =

Russian footballer

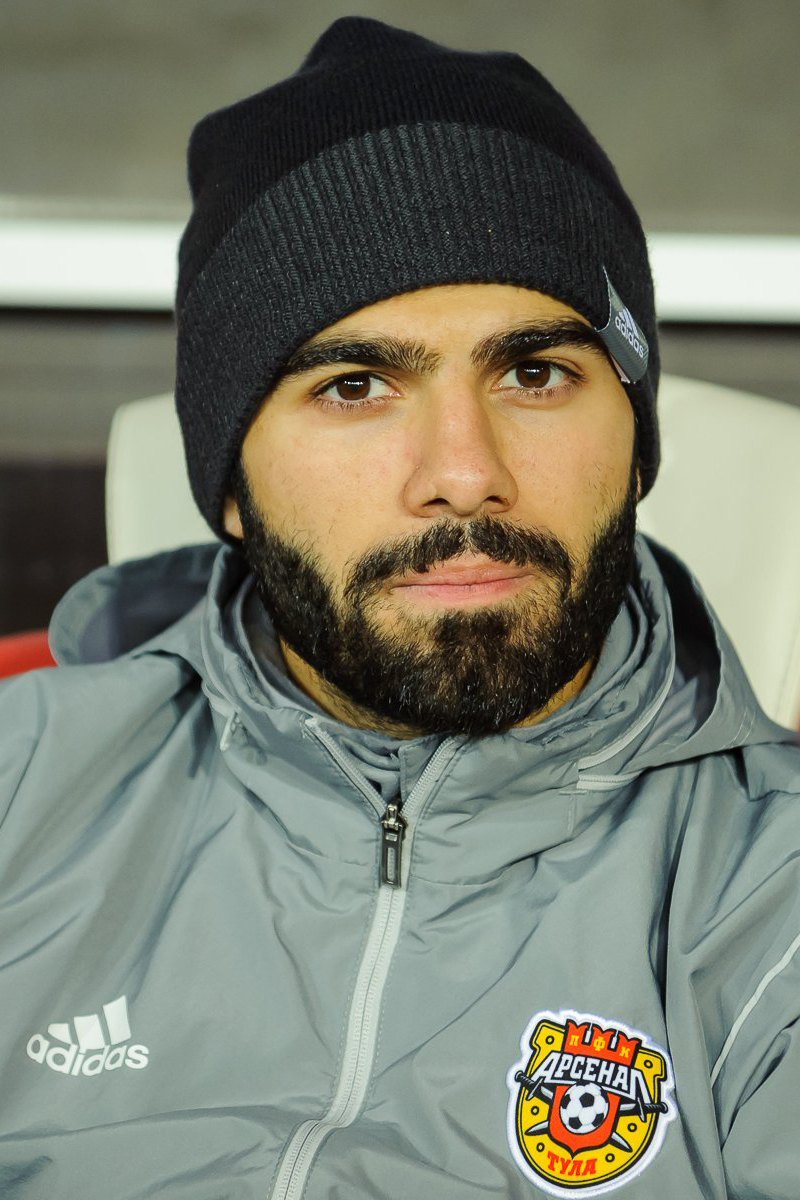
- Adzhoyev with Arsenal Tula in 2019

Personal information
- Full name: Guram Guramovich Adzhoyev
- Date of birth: 27 February 1995 (age 31)
- Place of birth: Miskolc, Hungary
- Height: 1.85 m (6 ft 1 in)
- Position: Forward

Youth career
- –2013: FC Saturn Ramenskoye
- 2013–2016: Dynamo Moscow

Senior career*
Years	Team	Apps	(Gls)
2016–2023	Arsenal Tula	18	(0)
2019–2020	→ FC Khimik-Arsenal	6	(2)
2021–2023	Arsenal-2 Tula	5	(0)
- * Club domestic league appearances and goals

Guram Guramovich Adzhoyev (Russian: Гурам Гурамович Аджоев; born 27 February 1995) is a Russian former football player.

== Club career ==
Adzhoyev made his debut in the Russian Football National League for Arsenal Tula on 15 May 2016 in a game against FC Fakel Voronezh.

Adzhoyev made his Russian Premier League debut for Arsenal Tula on 1 April 2017 in a game against FC Tom Tomsk.

== Personal life ==
He is of Yazidi heritage and his father, also named Guram Adzhoyev, was a professional footballer as well and is the current president of Arsenal Tula.

== Career statistics ==
=== Club ===
As of 11 December 2021

Club	Season	League			Cup		Continental		Total	
Club	Season	Division	Apps	Goals	Apps	Goals	Apps	Goals	Apps	Goals
Arsenal Tula	2015–16	FNL	2	0	0	0	–		2	0
Arsenal Tula	2016–17	RPL	1	0	0	0	–		1	0
Arsenal Tula	2017–18	RPL	1	0	0	0	–		1	0
Arsenal Tula	2018–19	RPL	5	0	2	0	–		7	0
Arsenal Tula	2019–20	RPL	1	0	0	0	0	0	1	0
Arsenal Tula	2020–21	RPL	5	0	2	0	–		7	0
Arsenal Tula	2021–22	RPL	0	0	0	0	–		0	0
Arsenal Tula	Total		15	0	4	0	0	0	19	0
Khimik-Arsenal	2019–20	PFL	6	2	–		–		6	2
Arsenal-2 Tula	2021–22	FNL 2	3	0	–		–		3	0
Career total			24	2	4	0	0	0	28	2
