= Nikita Golub =

Russian footballer

Personal information
- Full name: Nikita Sergeyevich Golub
- Date of birth: 14 February 1997 (age 29)
- Place of birth: Veliky Novgorod, Russia
- Height: 1.74 m (5 ft 9 in)
- Positions: Midfielder; forward

Team information
- Current team: Belshina Bobruisk
- Number: 21

Youth career
- SDYuSShOR-2 Veliky Novgorod

Senior career*
Years	Team	Apps	(Gls)
2015–2016	Vityaz Podolsk	21	(1)
2016–2017	Arsenal Tula	0	(0)
2017	Elektron Veliky Novgorod		
2017–2018	Dnepr Smolensk	13	(1)
2018–2019	Veles Moscow	26	(10)
2019–2020	Murom	8	(6)
2020–2021	Shinnik Yaroslavl	15	(2)
2021–2023	Murom	52	(11)
2023	Torpedo Vladimir	12	(0)
2024–	Belshina Bobruisk	74	(21)
- * Club domestic league appearances and goals as of 3 July 2026

Nikita Sergeyevich Golub (Russian: Никита Сергеевич Голуб; born 14 February 1997) is a Russian football player who plays as a midfielder for Belshina Bobruisk.

== Club career ==
He made his debut in the Russian Football National League for FC Shinnik Yaroslavl on 22 August 2020 in a game against FC Veles Moscow.
