= Andrei Potapov =

Russian footballer

Personal information
- Full name: Andrei Sergeyevich Potapov
- Date of birth: 26 January 1999 (age 27)
- Place of birth: Ramenskoye, Russia
- Height: 1.85 m (6 ft 1 in)
- Position: Midfielder

Youth career
- –2012: FC Saturn Ramenskoye
- 2013–2016: UOR #5 Yegoryevsk

Senior career*
Years	Team	Apps	(Gls)
2016–2017	FC Arsenal Tula	0	(0)
2017–2018	FC Rostov	0	(0)
2018–2020	FC Saturn Ramenskoye	34	(0)
2020–2022	FC Akron Tolyatti	38	(0)
2022–2023	FC Znamya Truda Orekhovo-Zuyevo	18	(0)
- * Club domestic league appearances and goals

Andrei Sergeyevich Potapov (Russian: Андрей Сергеевич Потапов; born 26 January 1999) is a Russian former football player.

== Club career ==
He made his debut in the Russian Football National League for FC Akron Tolyatti on 22 August 2020 in a game against FC Krasnodar-2.
