= Jherson Vergara =

Colombian footballer (born 1994)

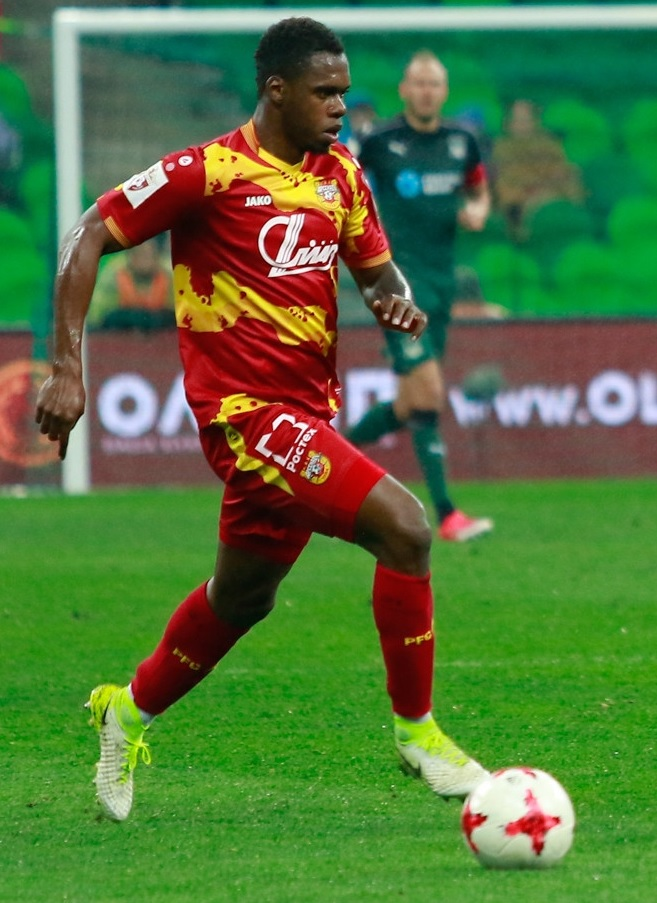
- Jherson with Arsenal Tula in 2017

Personal information
- Full name: Jherson Vergara Amú
- Date of birth: 26 May 1994 (age 32)
- Place of birth: Florida, Colombia
- Height: 1.87 m (6 ft 2 in)
- Position: Centre back

Youth career
- 2009–2011: Boca Juniors de Cali

Senior career*
Years	Team	Apps	(Gls)
2011–2013	Deportes Quindío	5	(0)
2011–2013	→ Universitario Popayán	30	(0)
2013–2018	AC Milan	0	(0)
2014	→ Parma (loan)	0	(0)
2014–2015	→ Avellino (loan)	14	(1)
2015–2016	→ Livorno (loan)	22	(1)
2016–2017	→ Arsenal Tula (loan)	18	(0)
2018–2019	Cagliari	0	(0)
2018–2019	→ Olbia (loan)	3	(0)
2020	Olbia	0	(0)
2021–2022	Vibonese	22	(1)

International career
2011	Colombia U17	9	(0)
2013	Colombia U20	18	(3)
- * Club domestic league appearances and goals as of 23 January 2022

Jherson Vergara Amú (born 26 May 1994) is a Colombian professional footballer who plays as a centre back.

== Career ==
=== Early career ===
A youth product of Boca Juniors de Cali, an amateur team, he signed his first official professional contract in 2011 with Deportes Quindío. Eventually, he was loaned to Universitario Popayán.

=== AC Milan ===
In May 2013, Vergara signed for Italian side AC Milan, for a fee of £1,760,000.

Although unofficial, Vergara played his first match with Milan in the 2013 Audi Cup against Manchester City. A game which Milan lost 3–5. During the pre-season, Vegara dislocated his shoulder and was reported to be out for a month. In late November 2013, it was reported that Vergara would go on loan during the January transfer.

==== Loan at Parma ====
In January 2014, Vergara was sent to Italian Serie A side Parma for the rest of the 2013–14 season.

==== Loan at Avellino ====
For the 2014–15 season, Vergara was loaned out to Avellino. He scored a goal in a win against Latina.

==== Loan at Livorno ====
For the 2015–16 season, Vergara was loaned out to Livorno.

==== Returning to Milan ====
After his stint at Livorno, Milan gave Vergara another chance during the 2016 summer pre-season.

==== Loan to Arsenal Tula ====
On 31 August 2016, he moved on loan to the Russian Premier League team FC Arsenal Tula for the 2016–17 season.

==== Back to Milan ====
For the 2017–18 season, Vergara was supposed to go on yet another loan. However, no deal materialized during both transfer windows and, as a result, he stayed at Milan as a non-playing member of the senior squad, similarly to Hachim Mastour, Nnamdi Oduamadi and Juan Mauri.

=== Cagliari ===
==== Loan to Olbia ====
On 17 August 2018, Cagliari announced the signing of Vergara and that he will be sent on loan to Serie C club Olbia for the 2018–19 season. On 31 January 2019 Olbia terminated the loan prematurely after he made only three appearances in the first half of the season.

=== Return to Olbia ===
He returned to Olbia on 9 June 2020 until the end of the 2019–20 season. The regular Serie C season was never resumed due to COVID-19 pandemic in Italy, Vergara remained on the bench in two relegation play-off games that Olbia played, and he left the club once again.

=== Vibonese ===
On 10 March 2021, he joined Serie C club Vibonese. On 27 January 2022, his contract with Vibonese was terminated by mutual consent.

== International career ==
=== Youth ===
Vergara was called up to represent the U20 side for Colombia during the 2013 South American Youth Championship. He scored a goal in the tournament against Paraguay in the last match of the second stage. Eventually, he won the championship with Colombia and received attention from many European clubs. Most noticeably, Italian giants A.C. Milan.

Vergara took part in the Colombian squad that finished runner-up in the 2013 Toulon Tournament. He scored two goals, both being equalizers against the United States and France. Colombia would end up winning both games.

== Career statistics ==
As of 20 October 2023

Appearances and goals by club, season and competition
Club	Season	League			National Cup		Continental		Other		Total	
Club	Season	Division	Apps	Goals	Apps	Goals	Apps	Goals	Apps	Goals	Apps	Goals
Milan	2013–14	Serie A	0	0	0	0	0	0	—		0	0
Avellino (loan)	2014–15	Serie B	14	1	1	0	—		1	0	16	1
Livorno (loan)	2015–16	Serie B	22	1	0	0	—		—		22	1
Tula (loan)	2016–17	Premier League	18	0	0	0	—		—		18	0
Olbia (loan)	2018–19	Serie C	3	0	0	0	—		—		3	0
Vibonese	2020–21	Serie C	7	0	0	0	—		—		7	0
Vibonese	2021–22	Serie C	15	1	0	0	—		—		15	1
Vibonese	Total		22	1	0	0	0	0	0	0	22	1
Career total			79	3	1	0	0	0	1	0	81	3

== Honours ==
=== National team ===
Colombia

- South American Youth Championship: 2013
