= Yaroslav Ivakin =

Russian footballer

Personal information
- Full name: Yaroslav Igorevich Ivakin
- Date of birth: 22 July 1998 (age 28)
- Place of birth: Murom, Russia
- Height: 1.73 m (5 ft 8 in)
- Position: Midfielder

Youth career
- –2010: SDYuShOR Vladimir
- 2010–2016: UOR #5 Yegoryevsk
- 2016–2018: FC Arsenal Tula

Senior career*
| Years | Team | Apps | (Gls) |
| 2016–2020 | FC Arsenal Tula | 3 | (0) |
| 2019–2020 | → FC Khimik-Arsenal | 15 | (4) |
| 2020–2021 | FC Tver | 18 | (7) |
| 2021–2022 | FC Arsenal-2 Tula | 5 | (2) |
| 2022 | FC Kosmos Dolgoprudny | 7 | (1) |
| 2023 | FC Yenisey Krasnoyarsk | 9 | (1) |
| 2023–2025 | FC Veles Moscow | 56 | (9) |
- * Club domestic league appearances and goals as of 14 June 2025

Yaroslav Igorevich Ivakin (Russian: Ярослав Игоревич Ивакин; born 22 July 1998) is a Russian football player.

== Club career ==
He made his debut in the Russian Premier League for FC Arsenal Tula on 13 May 2018 in a game against FC Lokomotiv Moscow.

== Career statistics ==
As of 13 May 2018

| Club | Season | League | | | Cup | | Continental | | Total | |
| Club | Season | Division | Apps | Goals | Apps | Goals | Apps | Goals | Apps | Goals |
|---|---|---|---|---|---|---|---|---|---|---|
| Arsenal Tula | 2016–17 | Russian Premier League | 0 | 0 | 0 | 0 | – | | 0 | 0 |
| Arsenal Tula | 2017–18 | Russian Premier League | 1 | 0 | 0 | 0 | – | | 1 | 0 |
| Career total | | | 1 | 0 | 0 | 0 | 0 | 0 | 1 | 0 |
