= Guram Adzhoyev (footballer, born 1961) =

Soviet footballer

Guram Adzhoyev Гурам Аджоев
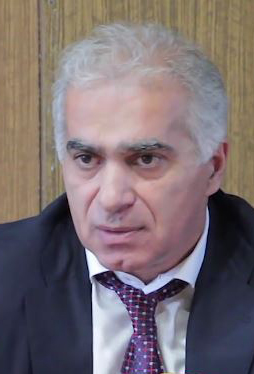

Personal information
- Full name: Guram Zakharovich Adzhoyev
- Date of birth: 18 October 1961 (age 65)
- Place of birth: Tbilisi, Georgian SSR
- Height: 1.82 m (5 ft 11 1/2 in)
- Positions: Midfielder; forward

Team information
- Current team: FC Arsenal Tula (president)

Youth career
- FSh Yuny Dinamovets Tbilisi

Senior career*
Years	Team	Apps	(Gls)
1979	FC Metallurg Rustavi		
1980	FC Dinamo Tbilisi	0	(0)
1980–1981	FC Torpedo Kutaisi	28	(7)
1981–1983	FC Dynamo Moscow	73	(6)
1984–1985	FC Spartak Moscow	20	(2)
1986–1987	FC Metalist Kharkiv	45	(7)
1987–1988	FC Dinamo Tbilisi	4	(0)
1988–1989	FC Metalist Kharkiv	51	(6)
1990	Beitar Jerusalem F.C.	17	(6)
1991–1993	FC Metalist Kharkiv	41	(9)
1993–1994	Diósgyőri VTK	46	(6)
1996–1998	FC Saturn Ramenskoye	83	(7)

Managerial career
- 2013–2015: FC Dynamo Moscow (director of sports)
- 2016–: FC Arsenal Tula (president)
- * Club domestic league appearances and goals

Guram Zakharovich Adzhoyev (Russian: Гурам Захарович Аджоев; born 18 October 1961) is a retired Soviet-Yazidi professional footballer. He is the president of FC Arsenal Tula.

== Playing career ==
He made his professional debut in the Soviet First League in 1980 for FC Torpedo Kutaisi.

His son, also called Guram Adzhoyev, is now a professional footballer as well.

== Honours ==
- Soviet Top League runner-up: 1984, 1985.
- Soviet Cup winner: 1988.
- Ukrainian Cup finalist: 1992.

== European Club Competitions ==
- UEFA Cup 1982–83 with FC Dynamo Moscow: 1 game.
- UEFA Cup 1984–85 with FC Spartak Moscow: 4 games.
- UEFA Cup 1985–86 with FC Spartak Moscow: 1 game.
- UEFA Cup 1987–88 with FC Dinamo Tbilisi: 2 games.
- European Cup Winners' Cup 1988–89 with FC Metalist Kharkiv: 4 games, 1 goal.
