= 2014–15 FC Arsenal Tula season =

FC Arsenal Tula
2014–15 season
- Chairman: Viktor Sokolovskiy
- Manager: Dmitri Alenichev
- Stadium: Arsenal Stadium
- Russian Premier League: 16th (Relegated)
- Russian Cup: Quarter-final vs Gazovik Orenburg
- Top goalscorer: League: Two Players (3); All: Artur Maloyan (4)
- Highest home attendance: 19,000 vs Zenit St. Petersburg; 2 August 2014
- Lowest home attendance: 2,100 vs Ufa; 2 December 2014
- Average home league attendance: 10,500; 31 May 2015
Home colours	Away colours

The 2014–15 FC Arsenal Tula season was the club's first season in the Russian Premier League, the highest tier of association football in Russia, and 7th in total. Terek Grozny will also be taking part in the Russian Cup.

== Squad ==
Note: Flags indicate national team as defined under FIFA eligibility rules; some limited exceptions apply. Players may hold more than one non-FIFA nationality.

No.	Pos.	Nation	Player
1	GK	RUS	Aleksandr Filimonov
2	DF	RUS	Ivan Yershov
3	DF	RUS	Ivan Lozenkov
4	DF	RUS	Andrei Vasilyev (on loan from Rostov)
5	DF	RUS	Anri Khagush
7	MF	RUS	Aleksandr Zotov (on loan from Spartak Moscow)
8	DF	RUS	Sergei Sukharev
9	MF	BLR	Uladzimir Karytska (on loan from Shinnik Yaroslavl)
10	MF	RUS	Sergey Kuznetsov
11	FW	ROU	Florin Costea
13	DF	RUS	Vladimir Mazov
14	FW	RUS	Sergey Maslov
15	MF	RUS	Vitali Orlov
16	GK	RUS	Sergei Kotov
17	MF	RUS	Ivan Baklanov (on loan from Rostov)
18	MF	MNE	Mladen Kašćelan
19	DF	RUS	Yevgeni Osipov
20	FW	RUS	Rinat Timokhin
21	MF	RUS	Pavel Sergeyev
22	DF	SVK	Lukáš Tesák
23	DF	RUS	Igor Kaleshin
24	MF	RUS	Dmitry Smirnov
25	FW	RUS	Marat Gubzhev
28	MF	RUS	Vladislav Ryzhkov
29	MF	RUS	Aleksei Gogiya
30	GK	RUS	Maksim Klikin
35	DF	RUS	Maksim Biryulin
36	GK	RUS	Mikhail Levashov

No.	Pos.	Nation	Player
37	GK	RUS	Maksim Staroverov
38	MF	RUS	Artur Maloyan
39	DF	RUS	Irakli Chezhiya
42	DF	RUS	Yevgeni Yezhov
44	DF	RUS	Yuri Medvedev
45	DF	RUS	Sergei Shaginyan
47	MF	RUS	Andrei Polin
48	FW	RUS	Aleksandr Kutyin
50	DF	RUS	Nikita Abramov
55	DF	RUS	Artur Farion
57	GK	RUS	Aleksei Skornyakov
59	FW	RUS	Edgar Gagity
69	FW	RUS	Pavel Belyanin
70	FW	RUS	Valeri Alshanskiy
71	MF	RUS	Aleksandr Zharinov
77	MF	RUS	Maksim Lepskiy
78	MF	RUS	Anton Babushkin
79	MF	RUS	Aleksandr Gordiyenko
82	FW	RUS	Vladimir Kotlov
86	FW	RUS	Leonid Boyev
87	GK	RUS	Aleksandr Leykin
90	MF	RUS	Andrei Lyakh
91	DF	RUS	Nikita Sorokin
93	DF	RUS	Aleksei Makorin
95	FW	RUS	Sergey Stepanov
99	GK	SVK	Ján Mucha (on loan from Krylia Sovetov)

=== Out on loan ===
Note: Flags indicate national team as defined under FIFA eligibility rules; some limited exceptions apply. Players may hold more than one non-FIFA nationality.

No. / Pos. / Nation / Player; 11 / FW / RUS / Aleksei Bazanov (at Baltika Kaliningrad)	No. / Pos. / Nation / Player; 88 / MF / RUS / Aleksandr Makarenko (at Baltika Kaliningrad)

=== Youth Team ===
Note: Flags indicate national team as defined under FIFA eligibility rules; some limited exceptions apply. Players may hold more than one non-FIFA nationality.

No.	Pos.	Nation	Player
26	FW	RUS	Arkadi Lobzin
37	DF	RUS	Dmitriy Tcukanov
40	DF	RUS	Pavel Borisov
46	GK	RUS	Sergei Kuziev
49	MF	RUS	Artyom Mingazov
51	DF	RUS	Aleksey Yurchak
54	FW	RUS	Aleksandr Zakarlyuka
61	GK	RUS	Anton Ilyin
66	DF	RUS	Aleksandr Karasyov
73	MF	RUS	Renat Gagity
75	MF	RUS	Yevgeni Alfyorov

No.	Pos.	Nation	Player
78	MF	RUS	Anton Babushkin
80	DF	RUS	Rustam Normatov
81	MF	RUS	Roman Salimov
89	MF	RUS	Dmitri Starodub
91	FW	RUS	Roman Izotov
92	DF	RUS	Andrei Nalyotov
94	DF	RUS	Aleksandr Matryonov
96	GK	RUS	Aleksandr Puchkov
97	FW	RUS	Denis Skoropupov
98	FW	RUS	Dmitri Fedchenko

== Transfers ==
=== Summer ===
In: Note: Flags indicate national team as defined under FIFA eligibility rules; some limited exceptions apply. Players may hold more than one non-FIFA nationality.

No.	Pos.	Nation	Player
7	MF	RUS	Aleksandr Zotov (on loan from (Russia) Spartak Moscow)
13	DF	RUS	Vladimir Mazov (from (Russia) FC Arsenal-2 Tula)
15	MF	RUS	Vitali Orlov (from (Russia) FC Arsenal-2 Tula)
17	MF	RUS	Ivan Baklanov (on loan from (Russia) Rostov)
19	DF	RUS	Yevgeni Osipov (from (Russia) Ufa)
22	DF	SVK	Lukáš Tesák (from (Russia) Torpedo Moscow)
25	FW	RUS	Marat Gubzhev (from (Russia) FC Arsenal-2 Tula)
29	MF	RUS	Aleksei Gogiya (from (Russia) FC Arsenal-2 Tula)
31	MF	RUS	Aleksandr Shmarov
32	DF	RUS	Nikita Sorokin (from (Russia) FC Arsenal-2 Tula)
33	MF	RUS	Aleksandr Kotenko (from (Russia) FC Arsenal-2 Tula)
35	DF	RUS	Maksim Biryulin
36	GK	RUS	Mikhail Levashov (from (Russia) FC Arsenal-2 Tula)
37	DF	RUS	Dmitri Tsukanov
38	FW	RUS	Artur Maloyan (on loan from (Russia) Shinnik Yaroslavl)
39	DF	RUS	Irakli Chezhiya (from (Russia) FC Arsenal-2 Tula)
40	DF	RUS	Pavel Borisov
41	GK	RUS	Maksim Staroverov (from (Russia) FC Arsenal-2 Tula)
42	FW	RUS	Andrei Zolotoy
44	DF	RUS	Yuri Medvedev (from (Russia) FC Arsenal-2 Tula)
49	MF	RUS	Artyom Mingazov (from (Russia) Khimik Novomoskovsk)
50	DF	RUS	Nikita Abramov (from (Russia) FC Arsenal-2 Tula)
51	MF	RUS	Aleksei Yurchak
54	FW	RUS	Aleksandr Zakarlyuka (from (Russia) Volga Nizhny Novgorod)
55	DF	RUS	Artur Farion (from (Russia) FC Arsenal-2 Tula)
57	MF	RUS	Vladislav Zotov (from (Russia) Dolgoprudny)
61	GK	RUS	Anton Ilyin
66	DF	RUS	Aleksandr Karasyov
69	FW	RUS	Pavel Belyanin (from (Russia) FC Arsenal-2 Tula)
71	MF	RUS	Aleksandr Zharinov (from (Russia) FC Arsenal-2 Tula)
75	DF	RUS	Yevgeni Alfyorov (on loan from (Russia) Zenit St. Petersburg)
78	MF	RUS	Anton Babushkin
79	MF	RUS	Aleksandr Gordiyenko (from (Russia) FC Arsenal-2 Tula)
80	DF	RUS	Rustam Normatov
81	MF	RUS	Roman Salimov (from (Russia) Kuban Krasnodar)
86	FW	RUS	Leonid Boyev (from (Russia) FC Arsenal-2 Tula)
87	GK	RUS	Aleksandr Leykin
91	FW	RUS	Roman Izotov
92	DF	RUS	Andrei Nalyotov (from (Russia) Volga Nizhny Novgorod)
93	DF	RUS	Aleksei Makorin
94	DF	RUS	Aleksandr Matrenov
95	FW	RUS	Sergei Stepanov (from (Russia) FC Arsenal-2 Tula)
96	GK	RUS	Aleksandr Puchkov
97	MF	RUS	Denis Skoropupov
98	MF	RUS	Dmitri Fedchenko
99	FW	RUS	Maxim Votinov (from (Russia) Baltika Kaliningrad)

Out: Note: Flags indicate national team as defined under FIFA eligibility rules; some limited exceptions apply. Players may hold more than one non-FIFA nationality.

No.	Pos.	Nation	Player
13	DF	MNE	Predrag Kašćelan (to (Russia) Khimik Dzerzhinsk)
19	MF	RUS	Dmitri Shilov (on loan to (Russia) Khimik Dzerzhinsk)
22	FW	RUS	Rinat Timokhin
92	MF	RUS	Aleksandr Kotenko (to (Russia) Arsenal-2 Tula)
99	FW	RUS	Pavel Belyanin (to (Russia) Arsenal-2 Tula)
—	MF	RUS	Vitali Orlov (to (Russia) Arsenal-2 Tula, previously on loan to (Russia) Kaluga)

=== Winter ===
In: Note: Flags indicate national team as defined under FIFA eligibility rules; some limited exceptions apply. Players may hold more than one non-FIFA nationality.

No.	Pos.	Nation	Player
5	DF	RUS	Anri Khagush (from (Belarus) BATE)
9	MF	BLR	Uladzimir Karytska (on loan from (Russia) Shinnik Yaroslavl)
11	FW	ROU	Florin Costea (from (Romania) Cluj)
20	FW	RUS	Rinat Timokhin
42	DF	RUS	Yevgeni Yezhov (from (Russia) Spartak Moscow)
45	DF	RUS	Sergei Shaginyan (from (Russia) Olimpik Mytishchi)
47	MF	RUS	Andrei Polin (from (Russia) Sportakademklub Moscow)
57	GK	RUS	Aleksei Skornyakov (from (Russia) Sokol Saratov)
59	FW	RUS	Edgar Gagity
70	FW	RUS	Valeri Alshanskiy (from (Russia) Krasnodar)
82	FW	RUS	Vladimir Kotlov (from (Russia) Sportakademklub Moscow)
99	GK	SVK	Ján Mucha (loan from (Russia) Krylia Sovetov)

Out: Note: Flags indicate national team as defined under FIFA eligibility rules; some limited exceptions apply. Players may hold more than one non-FIFA nationality.

No.	Pos.	Nation	Player
11	FW	RUS	Aleksei Bazanov (on loan to (Russia) Baltika Kaliningrad)
27	DF	RUS	Sergei Ignatyev (to (Kazakhstan) Irtysh)
31	MF	RUS	Aleksandr Shmarov
42	FW	RUS	Andrei Zolotoy
45	FW	RUS	Saveliy Larichkin
57	MF	RUS	Vladislav Zotov
68	MF	RUS	Artyom Zhabin
88	MF	RUS	Aleksandr Makarenko (on loan to (Russia) Baltika Kaliningrad)
99	FW	RUS	Maxim Votinov (to (Russia) Tosno)

== Competitions ==
=== Russian Premier League ===
==== Results by round ====
Round	1	2	3	4	5	6	7	8	9	10	11	12	13	14	15	16	17	18	19	20	21	22	23	24	25	26	27	28	29	30
Ground	A	H	H	H	A	H	A	H	A	H	A	A	A	H	H	H	A	A	A	H	H	H	A	A	A	H	A	H	A	A
Result	L	L	D	L	L	L	L	L	L	D	L	W	L	W	L	L	W	L	W	L	L	W	W	W	L	L	L	D	D	L
Position	16	15	16	16	16	16	16	16	16	16	16	16	16	16	16	16	15	15	14	14	15	15	13	13	14	15	15	15	16	16

Updated to match(es) played on 27 May 2015. Source: Russian Premier League
A = Away; H = Home; W = Win; D = Draw; L = Loss

==== Matches ====
2 August 2014 1	Arsenal Tula	0 – 4	Zenit St. Petersburg	Tula
19:00 MSK (UTC+4)	Kašćelan (yellow card) 49'	Summary	Criscito 9', 69'; Salomón Rondón 18'; Hulk 36'; Fayzulin (yellow card) 53'; Neto (yellow card) 90+1'	Stadium: Arsenal Stadium; Attendance: 19,000; Referee: Alexy Nikolaev

10 August 2014 2	Arsenal Tula	0 – 2	Lokomotiv Moscow	Tula
19:30 MSK (UTC+4)	Kaleshin (yellow card) 39'; Lyakh (yellow card) 57'	Summary	Ďurica (yellow card) 36'; Ćorluka (yellow card) 42'; Fernandes 53'; N'Doye 83'	Stadium: Arsenal Stadium; Attendance: 17,000; Referee: Sergey Ivanov

13 August 2014 3	Arsenal Tula	0 – 0	Rubin Kazan'	Tula
20:00 MSK (UTC+4)	Votinov (yellow card) 75'	Summary	Kvirkvelia (yellow card) 27'; Karadeniz (yellow card) 33'; Ryzhikov (yellow card) 75'; Kuzmin (yellow card) 85'; Ozdoev (yellow card) 90+2'; Wakaso (yellow card) 90+5'	Stadium: Arsenal Stadium; Attendance: 15,000; Referee: Igor Nizovtsev

17 August 2014 4	Arsenal Tula	1 – 2	Dynamo Moscow	Tula
16:00 MSK (UTC+4)	Kašćelan (yellow card) 21'; Lyakh (yellow card) 22'; Yershov 47'	Summary	Douglas 32'; Kurányi 45+1'; Valbuena (yellow card) 89'	Stadium: Arsenal Stadium; Attendance: 16,800; Referee: Aleksandr Egorov

22 August 2014 5	Terek Grozny	3 – 0	Arsenal Tula	Grozny
20:00 MSK (UTC+4)	Lebedenko 19'; Maurício 32'; Komorowski 45'; Utsiev (yellow card) 59'; Semyonov (yellow card) 71'	Summary	Maloyan (yellow card) 67'; Kašćelan (yellow card) 67'	Stadium: Akhmat-Arena; Attendance: 15,225; Referee: Sergey Lapochkin

30 August 2014 6	Arsenal Tula	0 – 1	Kuban Krasnodar	Tula
20:00 MSK (UTC+4)	Lozenkov (yellow card) 38'; Bazanov (yellow card) 85'; Ignatyev (yellow card) 87'	Summary	Bucur 86' (yellow card) 90'	Stadium: Arsenal Stadium; Attendance: 12,500; Referee: Aleksei Matyunin

13 September 2014 7	CSKA Moscow	2 – 1	Arsenal Tula	Khimki
13:30 MSK (UTC+4)	Natcho 20' (pen.); Eremenko 78'	Summary	Zotov 50'; Ryzhkov (yellow card) 61'; Vasilyev (yellow card) 63'	Stadium: Arena Khimki; Attendance: Vitali Meshkov; Referee: 10,000

19 September 2014 8	Arsenal Tula	0 – 1	Mordovia Saransk	Tula
20:00 MSK (UTC+4)	Tesák (yellow card) 89'	Summary	Vlasov (yellow card) 19'; Le Tallec (yellow card) 47'; Nakhushev (yellow card) 54'; R.Mukhametshin 70'; Lomić (yellow card) 76'; Danilo (yellow card) 88'	Stadium: Arsenal Stadium; Attendance: 10,100; Referee: Kirill Levnikov

28 September 2014 9	Krasnodar	3 – 0	Arsenal Tula	Krasnodar
18:30 MSK (UTC+4)	Gazinskiy (yellow card) 27'; Wánderson 33'; Pereyra 60'; Ari 66'	Summary	Lyakh (yellow card) 7'; Lozenkov (yellow card) 85'	Stadium: Kuban Stadium; Attendance: 5,987; Referee: Igor Fedotov

19 October 2014 10	Arsenal Tula	1 – 1	Rostov	Tula
16:30 MSK (UTC+4)	Ryzhkov (yellow card) 32'; Lozenkov (yellow card) 34'; Maloyan 57'	Summary	Bukharov 33' (yellow card) 70'; Gațcan (yellow card) 38'; Bardachow (yellow card) 62'	Stadium: Arsenal Stadium; Attendance: 8,500; Referee: Aleksei Matyunin

24 October 2014 11	Ural	1 – 0	Arsenal Tula	Yekaterinburg
17:00 MSK (UTC+4)	Yerokhin 38'	Summary	Zotov (yellow card) 6'	Stadium: Central Stadium; Attendance: 2,100; Referee: Aleksey Eskov

3 November 2014 12	Torpedo Moscow	0 – 1	Arsenal Tula	Ramensky District
14:00 MSK (UTC+3)	Steklov (yellow card) 29'	Summary	Maloyan 48'	Stadium: Saturn Stadium; Attendance: 2,200; Referee: Igor Nizovtsev

9 November 2014 13	Spartak Moscow	2 – 0	Arsenal Tula	Moscow
18:00 MSK (UTC+3)	Movsisyan 8'; Promes 22'; Ebert (yellow card) 61'	Summary	Lozenkov (yellow card) 90+2'	Stadium: Otkrytie Arena; Attendance: 21,100; Referee: Vladimir Moskalyov

23 November 2014 14	Arsenal Tula	4 – 0	Amkar Perm'	Tula
16:00 MSK (UTC+3)	Kuznetsov 8', 67'; Osipov 52'; Kutyin 56'	Summary	Ogude (yellow card) 20'; Gol (yellow card) 54'	Stadium: Arsenal Stadium; Attendance: 7,800; Referee: Aleksandr Egorov

29 November 2014 15	Arsenal Tula	1 – 2	Ural	Tula
13:30 MSK (UTC+3)	Lyakh (yellow card) 30'; Osipov (yellow card) 34'; Kašćelan (yellow card) 45+1'; Maslov 73'; Kutyin (yellow card) 90+3'	Summary	Yemelyanov (yellow card) 39'; Khozin 45'; Smolov 45+2'; Fontanello (yellow card) 48'; Manucharyan (yellow card) 65'	Stadium: Arsenal Stadium; Attendance: 7,500; Referee: Sergey Karasev

2 December 2014 16	Arsenal Tula	0 – 1	Ufa	Tula
19:00 MSK (UTC+3)	Zotov (yellow card) 55'; Osipov (yellow card) 83'	Summary	Handžić 22' (yellow card) 53'; Frimpong (yellow card) 54'; Marcinho (yellow card) 63'	Stadium: Arsenal Stadium; Attendance: 2,100; Referee: Aleksey Eskov

8 December 2014 17	Rostov	0 – 1	Arsenal Tula	Rostov-on-Don
19:00 MSK (UTC+3)	Goreux (yellow card) 30'; Bastos (yellow card) 46'; Dyakov (yellow card) 52'	Summary	Ryzhkov (yellow card) 16' (yellow-red card) 90+5'; Kašćelan 34'; Sukharev (yellow card) 39'	Stadium: Olimp-2; Attendance: 5,400; Referee: Aleksei Matyunin

9 March 2015 18	Rubin Kazan'	1 – 0	Arsenal Tula	Kazan
15:30 MSK (UTC+3)	Portnyagin 5'; Karadeniz (yellow card) 60'	Summary	Osipov (yellow card) 50'; Kašćelan (yellow card) 80'	Stadium: Kazan Arena; Attendance: 2,700; Referee: Vitaly Rushakov

14 March 2015 19	Lokomotiv Moscow	0 – 1	Arsenal Tula	Moscow
19:00 MSK (UTC+3)	Tarasov (yellow card) 84'	Summary	Maslov (yellow card) 32'; Zotov 66'; Mucha (yellow card) 84'	Stadium: Lokomotiv Stadium; Attendance: 8,427; Referee: Sergey Lapochkin

21 March 2015 20	Arsenal Tula	1 – 4	CSKA Moscow	Moscow
14:15 MSK (UTC+3)	Nalyotov (yellow card) 46'; Timokhin 53'; Chibirov (yellow card) 73'; Sergeyev (yellow card) 83'	Summary	Dzagoev 3'; Natcho 47'; Eremenko 82'; Strandberg 88'	Stadium: MSA Lokomotiv; Attendance: 1,300; Referee: Sergey Kulikov

5 April 2015 21	Arsenal Tula	1 – 3	Torpedo Moscow	Tula
19:15 MSK (UTC+3)	Maloyan 49'; Costea (yellow card) 65'	Summary	Pugin 42'; Mikuckis (yellow card) 46'; Katsalapov (yellow card) 57'; Kombarov 62'; Putsila 71'	Stadium: Arsenal Stadium; Attendance: 10,500; Referee: Aleksandr Egorov

9 April 2015 22	Arsenal Tula	1 – 0	Spartak Moscow	Tula
16:45 MSK (UTC+3)	Kašćelan (yellow card) 14'; Lyakh (yellow card) 70'; Smirnov 90+1'	Summary	Makeyev (yellow card) 41'; Promes (yellow card) 86'	Stadium: Arsenal Stadium; Attendance: 18,500; Referee: Mikhail Vilkov

12 April 2015 23	Ufa	0 – 1	Arsenal Tula	Saransk
16:00 MSK (UTC+3)		Summary	Karytska 33'; Zotov (yellow card) 78'	Stadium: Start Stadium; Attendance: 1,768; Referee: Aleksey Eskov

20 April 2015 24	Amkar Perm	0 – 1	Arsenal Tula	Perm
17:00 MSK (UTC+3)		Summary	Osipov (yellow card) 78'; Kašćelan (yellow card) 84'; Smirnov 90'	Stadium: Zvezda Stadium; Attendance: 4,800; Referee: Kirill Levnikov

26 April 2015 25	Zenit St. Petersburg	1 – 0	Arsenal Tula	Saint Petersburg
18:30 MSK (UTC+3)	Witsel 17' (yellow card) 36'	Summary	Yershov (yellow card) 27'	Stadium: Petrovsky Stadium; Attendance: 16,789; Referee: Vladimir Moskalyov

4 May 2015 26	Arsenal Tula	0 – 3	Krasnodar	Moscow
15:30 MSK (UTC+3)	Osipov (yellow card) 41'; Khagush (yellow card) 63'	Summary	Shirokov 38' (yellow card) 45+1'; Ari 55'; Granqvist (yellow card) 87'; Laborde 90+1'	Stadium: Lokomotiv Stadium; Attendance: 2,000; Referee: Sergey Ivanov

11 May 2015 27	Mordovia Saransk	1 – 0	Arsenal Tula	Saransk
16:00 MSK (UTC+3)	Le Tallec 45+2'; Niasse (yellow card) 69'	Summary	Sukharev (yellow card) 22'; Osipov (yellow card) 47'; Khagush (yellow card) 64'; Lyakh (yellow card) 78'; Kutyin (yellow card) 83'; Smirnov (yellow card) 87'	Stadium: Start Stadium; Referee: Aleksei Matyunin

16 May 2015 28	Arsenal Tula	1 – 1	Terek Grozny	Tula
16:30 MSK (UTC+3)	Karytska (yellow card) 30'; Kutyin 39'; Tesák (yellow card) 52'; Kašćelan (yellow card) 61'; Lyakh (yellow card) 80'	Summary	Mbengue 23'; Kuzyayev (yellow card) 38'; Hodzyur (yellow card) 69'	Stadium: Arsenal Stadium; Attendance: 9,200; Referee: Igor Fedotov

24 May 2015 29	Dynamo Moscow	2 – 2	Arsenal Tula	Moscow
18:30 MSK (UTC+3)	Büttner (yellow card) 28' (yellow-red card) 58'; Ionov (yellow card) 35' (goal) 42'; Zhirkov (yellow card) 43'; Douglas (yellow card) 64'; Zobnin (yellow card) 70'; Vainqueur 76'	Summary	Kaleshin (yellow card) 25'; Osipov 34' (yellow card) 90+1'; Khagush (yellow card) 48' (goal) 60'; Kašćelan (yellow card) 72'; Zotov (yellow card) 79'	Stadium: Arena Khimki; Attendance: 4,375; Referee: Vitaly Meshkov

30 May 2015 30	Kuban Krasnodar	5 – 1	Arsenal Tula	Krasnodar
13:30 MSK (UTC+3)	Baldé 45', 67'; Tkachyov 55', 62'; Kaleshin 81' (o.g.)	Summary	Kašćelan (yellow card) 72'; Kuznetsov 77'	Stadium: Kuban Stadium; Attendance: 6,521; Referee: Sergey Karasev

==== League table ====
Pos	Team	Pld	W	D	L	GF	GA	GD	Pts	Qualification or relegation
12	Ufa	30	7	10	13	26	39	−13	31	
13	Ural Sverdlovsk Oblast (O)	30	9	3	18	31	44	−13	30	Qualification for the Relegation play-offs
14	Rostov (O)	30	7	8	15	27	51	−24	29	Qualification for the Relegation play-offs
15	Torpedo Moscow (R)	30	6	11	13	28	45	−17	29	Relegation to Professional Football League
16	Arsenal Tula (R)	30	7	4	19	20	46	−26	25	Relegation to Football National League

Source: Russian Premier League
Rules for classification: 1) points; 2) number of matches won; 3) head-to-head points; 4) head-to-head wins; 5) head-to-head goal difference; 6) head-to-head goals; 7) number of head-to-head away goals; 8) goal difference; 9) number of goals scored; 10) number of away goals scored
(O) Play-off winners; (R) Relegated

=== Russian Cup ===
24 September 2014 Round of 32	Volgar Astrakhan	0 – 1	Arsenal Tula	Astrakhan
19:00 MSK (UTC+4)		Summary	Sukharev 51'; Smirnov (yellow card) 72'; Kašćelan (yellow card) 87'	Stadium: Central Stadium; Attendance: 3,000; Referee: Artem Chistyakov

29 October 2014 Round of 16	Zenit St. Petersburg	2 – 3 (a.e.t.)	Arsenal Tula	Saint Petersburg
19:00 MSK (UTC+3)	Arshavin 20'; Neto (yellow card) 27'; Rodić (yellow card) 70' (goal) 71'	Summary	Kaleshin 80'; Garay 90' (o.g.); Maloyan 104'; Sukharev (yellow card) 120'	Stadium: Petrovsky Stadium; Attendance: 17,625; Referee: Sergey Kulikov

3 March 2015 Quarterfinal	Arsenal Tula	0 – 1 (a.e.t.)	Gazovik Orenburg	Tula
18:00 MSK (UTC+3)	Zotov (yellow card) 115'	Summary	Koronov 112'; Poluyakhtov (yellow card) 120'	Stadium: Arsenal Stadium; Attendance: 10,200; Referee: Sergey Ivanov

== Squad statistics ==
As of match played 30 May 2015

=== Appearances and goals ===
No.	Pos	Nat	Player	Total		Premier League		Russian Cup	
No.	Pos	Nat	Player	Apps	Goals	Apps	Goals	Apps	Goals
1	GK	(Russia) RUS	Aleksandr Filimonov	19	0	17	0	2	0
2	DF	(Russia) RUS	Ivan Yershov	16	1	11+3	1	2	0
3	DF	(Russia) RUS	Ivan Lozenkov	13	0	12+1	0	0	0
4	DF	(Russia) RUS	Andrei Vasilyev	17	0	14+1	0	1+1	0
5	DF	(Russia) RUS	Anri Khagush	12	1	11	1	1	0
7	MF	(Russia) RUS	Aleksandr Zotov	23	2	18+3	2	2	0
8	DF	(Russia) RUS	Sergei Sukharev	19	1	14+2	0	3	1
9	MF	(Belarus) BLR	Uladzimir Karytska	8	1	7+1	1	0	0
10	FW	(Russia) RUS	Sergey Kuznetsov	30	3	21+6	3	3	0
11	FW	(Romania) ROU	Florin Costea	7	0	3+4	0	0	0
14	FW	(Russia) RUS	Sergey Maslov	13	1	11+1	1	0+1	0
16	GK	(Russia) RUS	Sergei Kotov	2	0	1	0	1	0
18	MF	(Montenegro) MNE	Mladen Kašćelan	29	1	25+1	1	3	0
19	DF	(Russia) RUS	Yevgeni Osipov	25	2	24	2	1	0
20	FW	(Russia) RUS	Rinat Timokhin	1	1	0+1	1	0	0
21	MF	(Russia) RUS	Pavel Sergeyev	1	0	0+1	0	0	0
22	DF	(Slovakia) SVK	Lukáš Tesák	26	0	22+1	0	2+1	0
23	DF	(Russia) RUS	Igor Kaleshin	20	1	17	0	3	1
24	MF	(Russia) RUS	Dmitry Smirnov	20	2	7+10	2	2+1	0
28	MF	(Russia) RUS	Vladislav Ryzhkov	27	0	18+8	0	1	0
38	MF	(Russia) RUS	Artur Maloyan	23	4	15+7	3	1	1
42	DF	(Russia) RUS	Yevgeni Yezhov	1	0	1	0	0	0
44	DF	(Russia) RUS	Yuri Medvedev	1	0	0+1	0	0	0
48	FW	(Russia) RUS	Aleksandr Kutyin	19	2	13+3	2	2+1	0
54	FW	(Russia) RUS	Aleksandr Zakarlyuka	1	0	1	0	0	0
55	DF	(Russia) RUS	Artur Farion	1	0	1	0	0	0
63	DF	(Russia) RUS	Aleksandr Chibirov	1	0	1	0	0	0
75	MF	(Russia) RUS	Yevgeni Alfyorov	1	0	1	0	0	0
77	MF	(Russia) RUS	Maksim Lepskiy	3	0	2+1	0	0	0
81	MF	(Russia) RUS	Roman Salimov	1	0	1	0	0	0
85	MF	(Russia) RUS	Aleksandr Kryuchkov	1	0	1	0	0	0
86	FW	(Russia) RUS	Leonid Boyev	1	0	1	0	0	0
88	MF	(Russia) RUS	Aleksandr Makarenko	5	0	1+3	0	1	0
89	MF	(Russia) RUS	Dmitri Starodub	1	0	1	0	0	0
90	MF	(Russia) RUS	Andrei Lyakh	23	0	14+7	0	2	0
92	DF	(Russia) RUS	Andrei Nalyotov	1	0	1	0	0	0
99	GK	(Slovakia) SVK	Ján Mucha	12	0	12	0	0	0
Players away from the club on loan:
11	FW	(Russia) RUS	Aleksei Bazanov	9	0	2+6	0	1	0
Players who appeared for Arsenal Tula no longer at the club:
27	DF	(Russia) RUS	Sergei Ignatyev	9	0	4+4	0	1	0
99	FW	(Russia) RUS	Maxim Votinov	10	0	3+6	0	1	0

=== Goal scorers ===
Place	Position	Nation	Number	Name	Russian Premier League	Russian Cup	Total
1	MF	(Russia)	38	Artur Maloyan	3	1	4
2	FW	(Russia)	10	Sergey Kuznetsov	3	0	3
3	MF	(Russia)	7	Aleksandr Zotov	2	0	2
3	MF	(Russia)	24	Dmitry Smirnov	2	0	2
3	FW	(Russia)	48	Aleksandr Kutyin	2	0	2
3	DF	(Russia)	19	Yevgeni Osipov	2	0	2
7	DF	(Russia)	2	Ivan Yershov	1	0	1
7	FW	(Russia)	14	Sergey Maslov	1	0	1
7	MF	(Montenegro)	18	Mladen Kašćelan	1	0	1
7	FW	(Russia)	20	Rinat Timokhin	1	0	1
7	MF	(Belarus)	9	Uladzimir Karytska	1	0	1
7	DF	(Russia)	5	Anri Khagush	1	0	1
7	DF	(Russia)	8	Sergei Sukharev	0	1	1
7	DF	(Russia)	23	Igor Kaleshin	0	1	1
7				Own goal	0	1	1
				TOTALS	20	4	24

=== Disciplinary record ===
Number	Nation	Position	Name	Russian Premier League		Russian Cup		Total	
Number	Nation	Position	Name	Yellow card	Red card	Yellow card	Red card	Yellow card	Red card
2	(Russia)	DF	Ivan Yershov	1	0	0	0	1	0
3	(Russia)	DF	Ivan Lozenkov	4	0	0	0	4	0
4	(Russia)	DF	Andrei Vasilyev	1	0	0	0	1	0
5	(Russia)	DF	Anri Khagush	3	0	0	0	3	0
7	(Russia)	MF	Aleksandr Zotov	4	0	1	0	5	0
8	(Russia)	DF	Sergei Sukharev	3	0	0	0	3	0
9	(Belarus)	MF	Uladzimir Karytska	1	0	0	0	1	0
11	(Russia)	FW	Aleksei Bazanov	1	0	0	0	1	0
11	(Romania)	FW	Florin Costea	1	0	0	0	1	0
14	(Russia)	FW	Sergey Maslov	1	0	0	0	1	0
18	(Montenegro)	MF	Mladen Kašćelan	10	0	1	0	11	0
19	(Russia)	DF	Yevgeni Osipov	7	0	0	0	7	0
21	(Russia)	MF	Pavel Sergeyev	1	0	0	0	1	0
22	(Slovakia)	DF	Lukáš Tesák	2	0	0	0	2	0
23	(Russia)	DF	Igor Kaleshin	2	0	0	0	2	0
24	(Russia)	MF	Dmitry Smirnov	1	0	1	0	2	0
27	(Russia)	DF	Sergei Ignatyev	1	0	0	0	1	0
28	(Russia)	MF	Vladislav Ryzhkov	4	1	0	0	4	1
38	(Russia)	MF	Artur Maloyan	1	0	0	0	1	0
48	(Russia)	FW	Aleksandr Kutyin	2	0	0	0	2	0
63	(Russia)	DF	Aleksandr Chibirov	1	0	0	0	1	0
90	(Russia)	MF	Andrei Lyakh	7	0	0	0	7	0
92	(Russia)	DF	Andrei Nalyotov	1	0	0	0	1	0
99	(Russia)	FW	Maxim Votinov	1	0	0	0	1	0
99	(Slovakia)	GK	Ján Mucha	1	0	0	0	1	0
			TOTALS	61	1	4	0	65	1

== Notes ==
- MSK time changed from UTC+4 to UTC+3 permanently on 26 October 2014.
