= List of Russian football transfers winter 2014–15 =

This is a list of Russian football transfers in the winter transfer window 2014–15 by club. Only clubs of the 2014–15 Russian Premier League are included.

== Russian Premier League 2014-15 ==
=== Amkar Perm ===
In: Note: Flags indicate national team as defined under FIFA eligibility rules; some limited exceptions apply. Players may hold more than one non-FIFA nationality.

No.	Pos.	Nation	Player
4	DF	RUS	Maksim Batov (from Zenit St. Petersburg)
9	FW	RUS	Aleksandr Prudnikov (from Dynamo Moscow)
15	GK	RUS	Dmitri Khomich (from (Kazakhstan) Kairat)
50	DF	ARM	Robert Arzumanyan (from (Kazakhstan) Aktobe)
53	DF	RUS	Aleksandr Mosunov
71	GK	RUS	Anatoli Krasilnikov
72	FW	RUS	Ivan Ivanchenko
89	FW	BLR	Kirill Sidorenko (end of loan to (Belarus) Vitebsk)
91	DF	UKR	Bohdan Butko (on loan from (Ukraine) Shakhtar Donetsk)

Out: Note: Flags indicate national team as defined under FIFA eligibility rules; some limited exceptions apply. Players may hold more than one non-FIFA nationality.

No.	Pos.	Nation	Player
15	FW	LVA	Vladimirs Kamešs (to (Poland) Pogoń Szczecin)
25	DF	POL	Damian Zbozień (on loan to (Poland) GKS Bełchatów)
31	DF	POL	Jakub Wawrzyniak (to (Poland) Lechia Gdańsk)
42	GK	RUS	Sergei Narubin (to Tosno)
47	DF	RUS	Roman Urkhov (to Region 69 Tver Oblast)
95	MF	RUS	Mikhail Rozhkov (to Astrakhan)
97	DF	FRA	Thomas Phibel (released)
99	FW	RUS	Aleksandr Subbotin (to Baltika Kaliningrad)

=== Arsenal Tula ===
In: Note: Flags indicate national team as defined under FIFA eligibility rules; some limited exceptions apply. Players may hold more than one non-FIFA nationality.

No.	Pos.	Nation	Player
5	DF	RUS	Anri Khagush (from (Belarus) BATE)
9	MF	BLR	Uladzimir Karytska (on loan from Shinnik Yaroslavl)
11	FW	ROU	Florin Costea (from (Romania) CFR Cluj)
20	FW	RUS	Rinat Timokhin (free agent)
42	DF	RUS	Yevgeni Yezhov (from Spartak Moscow)
45	DF	RUS	Sergei Shaginyan (from Olimpik Mytishchi)
47	MF	RUS	Andrei Polin (from Sportakademklub Moscow)
57	GK	RUS	Aleksei Skornyakov (from Sokol Saratov)
59	FW	RUS	Edgar Gagity (free agent)
63	DF	RUS	Aleksandr Chibirov (from Kolomna)
70	FW	RUS	Valeri Alshanskiy (from Krasnodar)
82	FW	RUS	Vladimir Kotlov (from Sportakademklub Moscow)
99	GK	SVK	Ján Mucha (loan from Krylia Sovetov)

Out: Note: Flags indicate national team as defined under FIFA eligibility rules; some limited exceptions apply. Players may hold more than one non-FIFA nationality.

No.	Pos.	Nation	Player
11	FW	RUS	Aleksei Bazanov (on loan to Baltika Kaliningrad)
27	DF	RUS	Sergei Ignatyev (to (Kazakhstan) Irtysh)
31	MF	RUS	Aleksandr Shmarov
39	DF	RUS	Irakli Chezhiya (to (Armenia) Ulisses)
42	FW	RUS	Andrei Zolotoy
45	FW	RUS	Saveliy Larichkin
47	MF	RUS	Andrei Polin
57	MF	RUS	Vladislav Zotov
68	MF	RUS	Artyom Zhabin
82	FW	RUS	Vladimir Kotlov
88	MF	RUS	Aleksandr Makarenko (on loan to Baltika Kaliningrad)
99	FW	RUS	Maxim Votinov (to Tosno)

=== CSKA Moscow ===
In: Note: Flags indicate national team as defined under FIFA eligibility rules; some limited exceptions apply. Players may hold more than one non-FIFA nationality.

No.	Pos.	Nation	Player
17	FW	SWE	Alibek Aliev (from (Sweden) Elfsborg)
26	MF	LBR	Sekou Oliseh (end of loan to Kuban Krasnodar)
44	GK	RUS	Georgi Kyrnats
76	DF	RUS	Kirill Sarayev
77	GK	RUS	Dmitri Zhuravlyov (from own academy)
84	GK	RUS	Pavel Ovchinnikov
97	FW	SWE	Carlos Strandberg (from (Sweden) BK Häcken)

Out: Note: Flags indicate national team as defined under FIFA eligibility rules; some limited exceptions apply. Players may hold more than one non-FIFA nationality.

No.	Pos.	Nation	Player
11	FW	BRA	Vitinho (on loan to (Brazil) Internacional)
20	MF	SWE	Rasmus Elm (to (Sweden) Kalmar)
33	GK	RUS	Vyacheslav Isupov (released)
41	GK	RUS	Pavel Mayorov (released)
46	FW	RUS	Nikolai Dergachyov (on loan to (Czech Republic) Dukla Prague)
59	DF	RUS	Andrei Sorokin (released)
62	DF	RUS	Denis Nikitin (to Lokomotiv Moscow)
63	DF	RUS	Yegor Matunov (released)
71	FW	RUS	Konstantin Bazelyuk (on loan to Torpedo Moscow)
88	FW	CIV	Seydou Doumbia (to (Italy) Roma)
89	FW	CZE	Tomáš Necid (to (Netherlands) PEC Zwolle, previously on loan)
95	GK	RUS	Sergei Revyakin (released)
96	FW	RUS	Vadim Larionov (on loan to Sibir-2 Novosibirsk)
—	MF	CHI	Mark González (released, previously on loan to (Chile) Universidad Católica)

=== Dynamo Moscow ===
In: Note: Flags indicate national team as defined under FIFA eligibility rules; some limited exceptions apply. Players may hold more than one non-FIFA nationality.

No.	Pos.	Nation	Player
85	MF	RUS	Nikita Kanavin
86	MF	RUS	Artyom Malakhov (free agent, previously at Metallurg-Oskol Stary Oskol)
89	DF	RUS	Nikolai Mayorsky

Out: Note: Flags indicate national team as defined under FIFA eligibility rules; some limited exceptions apply. Players may hold more than one non-FIFA nationality.

No.	Pos.	Nation	Player
13	DF	RUS	Vladimir Granat (on loan to Rostov)
16	MF	ECU	Christian Noboa (to (Greece) PAOK)
23	MF	BUL	Stanislav Manolev (to Kuban Krasnodar)
57	DF	RUS	Pavel Derevyagin
78	FW	RUS	Ruslan Suanov (to Zenit St. Petersburg)
99	FW	RUS	Aleksandr Prudnikov (to Amkar Perm)
—	FW	RUS	Dmitri Otstavnov (to Rubin Kazan, previously on loan to Neftekhimik Nizhnekamsk)
—	FW	RUS	Andrei Panyukov (on loan to (Lithuania) Atlantas, previously on loan to Baltika Kaliningrad)

=== Krasnodar ===
In: Note: Flags indicate national team as defined under FIFA eligibility rules; some limited exceptions apply. Players may hold more than one non-FIFA nationality.

No.	Pos.	Nation	Player
15	MF	RUS	Roman Shirokov (on loan from Spartak Moscow)
41	DF	RUS	Aleksei Tatayev
43	MF	RUS	Daur Kvekveskiri (from Krasnodar-3)
48	MF	RUS	Aleksandr Sergeyev
52	GK	RUS	Yevgeni Latyshonok
58	FW	RUS	Ilya Yurchenko (from Viktor Ponedelnik Academy Rostov-on-Don)
59	DF	RUS	Nikita Katayev
62	MF	RUS	Ruslan Rzayev
63	MF	RUS	Vladislav Pavlyuchenko (from Dynamo Moscow)
65	DF	RUS	Andrei Gamalyan (end of loan to (Armenia) Shirak)
67	MF	RUS	Yaroslav Komarov
79	DF	RUS	Batraz Gurtsiyev
82	MF	RUS	Nikita Rulevsky
92	MF	RUS	Ivan Takhmazov

Out: Note: Flags indicate national team as defined under FIFA eligibility rules; some limited exceptions apply. Players may hold more than one non-FIFA nationality.

No.	Pos.	Nation	Player
2	DF	RUS	Nikolai Markov (on loan to Ural Sverdlovsk Oblast)
19	FW	RUS	Nikita Burmistrov (on loan to Tom Tomsk)
41	MF	RUS	Yevgeni Andriyenko (released)
43	DF	RUS	Ruslan Shlyakhov (released)
48	DF	RUS	Aleksandr Marchenko (on loan to Chernomorets Novorossiysk)
54	MF	RUS	Aleksei Orlov (released)
58	MF	RUS	Pavel Kryzhevskikh (on loan to Spartak Nalchik)
62	FW	RUS	Valeri Alshanskiy (to Arsenal Tula)
63	FW	RUS	Nikolay Komlichenko (on loan to Chernomorets Novorossiysk)
65	FW	RUS	Boris Shavlokhov (released)
82	MF	RUS	Nikolay Ogurtsov (on loan to Spartak Nalchik)
85	DF	RUS	Stepan Protsenko (released)
92	DF	RUS	Aleksei Shatokhin (released)
—	DF	RUS	Oleg Mikhaylov (released, previously on loan to Spartak Nalchik)
—	MF	ARM	Marcos Pizzelli (to (Kazakhstan) Aktobe, previously on loan)

=== Kuban Krasnodar ===
In: Note: Flags indicate national team as defined under FIFA eligibility rules; some limited exceptions apply. Players may hold more than one non-FIFA nationality.

No.	Pos.	Nation	Player
20	FW	POR	Hugo Almeida (from (Italy) Cesena)
29	MF	BUL	Stanislav Manolev (from Dynamo Moscow)
60	MF	RUS	Valeri Zubov
61	FW	RUS	Sergei Obraztsov (from TsSPF Krasnodar)
62	MF	RUS	Artyom Yakovlev
63	MF	RUS	Aleksandr Kurteyan (from Dynamo St. Petersburg school)
69	MF	RUS	Vladislav Rochev (from TsSPF Krasnodar)
77	MF	RUS	Sergei Tkachyov (loan from Lokomotiv Moscow)
80	DF	RUS	Aleksandr Ladik
82	GK	RUS	Maksim Zamyshlyayev (free agent)
87	FW	RUS	Aleksandr Rybakov
85	FW	RUS	Vardan Pogosyan (from (Spain) S.S. Reyes)
96	MF	UKR	Dmytro Shcherbak

Out: Note: Flags indicate national team as defined under FIFA eligibility rules; some limited exceptions apply. Players may hold more than one non-FIFA nationality.

No.	Pos.	Nation	Player
15	DF	BLR	Maksim Zhavnerchik (to (Belarus) BATE)
19	FW	BRA	Danilo (end of loan from (Ukraine) Zorya Luhansk)
20	FW	URU	Gonzalo Bueno (on loan to (Uruguay) Nacional)
26	MF	LBR	Sekou Oliseh (end of loan from CSKA Moscow)
33	GK	RUS	Bogdan Karyukin (released)
47	DF	RUS	Artur Akhmedzhanov (to Chernomorets Novorossiysk)
80	MF	RUS	Anton Sekret (released)
87	MF	RUS	Islam Tsaniyev (released)
94	MF	RUS	Andrei Tsepa (released)
95	MF	RUS	Viktor Chuvilov (on loan to Torpedo Armavir)
—	FW	CRC	Marco Ureña (to (Denmark) Midtjylland, previously on loan)

=== Lokomotiv Moscow ===
In: Note: Flags indicate national team as defined under FIFA eligibility rules; some limited exceptions apply. Players may hold more than one non-FIFA nationality.

No.	Pos.	Nation	Player
25	FW	SRB	Petar Škuletić (from (Serbia) Partizan)
54	DF	RUS	Vladislav Shadrin
63	DF	RUS	Denis Nikitin (from CSKA Moscow)
64	FW	RUS	Aleksandr Smirnov (from own academy)
65	DF	RUS	Innokenti Samokhvalov
72	DF	RUS	Ratibor Gusar
89	MF	RUS	Nikita Dorofeyev
91	FW	RUS	Nikita Podyachev
93	MF	RUS	Andrei Mostovoy (from own academy)
94	MF	RUS	Dmitri Rybchinsky

Out: Note: Flags indicate national team as defined under FIFA eligibility rules; some limited exceptions apply. Players may hold more than one non-FIFA nationality.

No.	Pos.	Nation	Player
30	FW	RUS	Arshak Koryan (to (Netherlands) Vitesse Arnhem)
33	FW	SEN	Dame N'Doye (to (England) Hull City)
46	DF	RUS	Artyom Vyatkin (to Zenit St. Petersburg)
56	DF	RUS	Tomas Rukas (to (Portugal) Leiria)
75	DF	RUS	Aleksandr Seraskhov (to Sokol Saratov)
77	MF	RUS	Sergei Tkachyov (on loan to Kuban)
95	FW	RUS	Nojim Babadzhanov
97	FW	RUS	Grigori Gerasimov (to Zenit Penza)

=== Mordovia Saransk ===
In: Note: Flags indicate national team as defined under FIFA eligibility rules; some limited exceptions apply. Players may hold more than one non-FIFA nationality.

No.	Pos.	Nation	Player
3	DF	RUS	Yevgeni Gapon (from Shinnik Yaroslavl)
14	FW	RUS	Pavel Yakovlev (on loan from Spartak Moscow)
16	FW	POR	Yannick Djaló (on loan from (Portugal) S.L. Benfica)
22	FW	RUS	Sergey Samodin (end of loan to Shinnik Yaroslavl)
23	FW	RUS	Ruslan Mukhametshin (from Rubin Kazan, previously on loan)
69	MF	RUS	Vladislav Nurgaleyev (own academy)
71	GK	RUS	Ilya Kamalikhin (from MGPI-Mordovia Saransk)
72	DF	RUS	Eduard Mansurov (from Mordovia-2 Saransk)
74	FW	RUS	Aleksandr Cherentayev (from Mordovia-2 Saransk)
75	FW	RUS	Denis Abramov (free agent)
76	FW	RUS	Ilya Yermoshkin (from Saransk-Mordovia Saransk)
77	DF	RUS	Sergei Uchelkin (from Mordovia-2 Saransk)
81	GK	RUS	Nikita Khaykin
82	DF	RUS	Vladimir Kotkov
83	FW	RUS	Maksim Churakov

Out: Note: Flags indicate national team as defined under FIFA eligibility rules; some limited exceptions apply. Players may hold more than one non-FIFA nationality.

No.	Pos.	Nation	Player
13	FW	RUS	Mikhail Markin (on loan to Khimki)
24	MF	MDA	Alexandru Suvorov (to (Moldova) Milsami Orhei)

=== Rostov ===
In: Note: Flags indicate national team as defined under FIFA eligibility rules; some limited exceptions apply. Players may hold more than one non-FIFA nationality.

No.	Pos.	Nation	Player
3	DF	RUS	Vladimir Granat (on loan from Dynamo Moscow)
17	MF	TKM	Vahyt Orazsahedov (from (Turkey) Osmanlıspor)
16	MF	MDA	Mihai Plătică (from (Moldova) Zimbru Chișinău)
20	FW	IRN	Sardar Azmoun (on loan from Rubin Kazan)
22	FW	RUS	Artem Dzyuba (on loan from Spartak Moscow)
25	DF	RUS	Ivan Novoseltsev (from Torpedo Moscow)
71	MF	RUS	Said-Ali Akhmayev (from Spartak Moscow)
73	FW	RUS	Aleksei Grechkin (from Spartak Moscow)
91	FW	RUS	Danila Khakhalev (from Rostov-M-2 Rostov-on-Don)
96	MF	RUS	Aleksandr Yuryev (from Spartak Moscow)
97	GK	RUS	Yevgeni Goshev (from Rostov-M-2 Rostov-on-Don)

Out: Note: Flags indicate national team as defined under FIFA eligibility rules; some limited exceptions apply. Players may hold more than one non-FIFA nationality.

No.	Pos.	Nation	Player
3	DF	RUS	Ruslan Abazov (on loan to Tyumen)
17	MF	RUS	Nika Chkhapeliya (on loan to Zenit Penza)
18	MF	RUS	Azim Fatullayev (on loan to Tosno)
20	DF	HAI	Réginal Goreux

=== Rubin Kazan ===
In: Note: Flags indicate national team as defined under FIFA eligibility rules; some limited exceptions apply. Players may hold more than one non-FIFA nationality.

No.	Pos.	Nation	Player
4	DF	URU	Guillermo Cotugno (on loan from (Uruguay) Danubio)
6	MF	RUS	Insar Salakhetdinov (from LFK Lokomotiv Moscow)
8	DF	RUS	Ilya Shabanov (from LFK Rubin Kazan)
9	FW	RUS	Dmitri Otstavnov (from Dynamo Moscow, previously on loan to Neftekhimik Nizhnekamsk)
11	MF	RUS	Almaz Sharafeyev
21	FW	RUS	Nikita Vorona (free agent)
11	MF	RUS	Arthur Sharafeyev

Out: Note: Flags indicate national team as defined under FIFA eligibility rules; some limited exceptions apply. Players may hold more than one non-FIFA nationality.

No.	Pos.	Nation	Player
4	DF	RUS	Taras Burlak (on loan to Krylia Sovetov Samara)
11	FW	UKR	Marko Dević (on loan to (Qatar) Al Rayyan)
19	FW	RUS	Kamil Mullin (on loan to Sokol Saratov)
32	MF	RUS	Stefan Balabanov (released)
50	MF	RUS	Ivan Zaytsev (to Zenit-Izhevsk)
51	DF	RUS	Ayrat Mukhtarov (released)
69	FW	IRN	Sardar Azmoun (on loan to Rostov)
87	DF	AZE	Ruslan Abışov (to (Azerbaijan) Gabala, previously on loan)
—	FW	RUS	Ruslan Mukhametshin (to Mordovia Saransk, previously on loan)

=== Spartak Moscow ===
In: Note: Flags indicate national team as defined under FIFA eligibility rules; some limited exceptions apply. Players may hold more than one non-FIFA nationality.

No.	Pos.	Nation	Player
11	MF	ARM	Aras Özbiliz (back from serious injury)
71	FW	RUS	Maksimiliano Artemio Lyalyushkin (from own academy)
91	GK	RUS	Aleksandr Maksimenko (from own academy)
98	GK	RUS	Ilya Sukhoruchenko (free agent)

Out: Note: Flags indicate national team as defined under FIFA eligibility rules; some limited exceptions apply. Players may hold more than one non-FIFA nationality.

No.	Pos.	Nation	Player
5	MF	ARG	Tino Costa (on loan to (Italy) Genoa)
9	MF	RUS	Roman Shirokov (on loan to Krasnodar)
14	DF	RUS	Pavel Yakovlev (on loan to Mordovia Saransk)
22	FW	RUS	Artem Dzyuba (on loan to Rostov)
33	DF	ITA	Salvatore Bocchetti (on loan to (Italy) Milan)
43	GK	RUS	Yuri Shleyev (to Mashuk-KMV Pyatigorsk)
71	FW	RUS	Said-Ali Akhmayev (to Rostov)
75	DF	RUS	Aleksei Grechkin (to Rostov)
82	DF	RUS	Yevgeni Yezhov (to Arsenal Tula)
84	FW	RUS	Aleksandr Yuryev (to Rostov)

=== Terek Grozny ===
In: Note: Flags indicate national team as defined under FIFA eligibility rules; some limited exceptions apply. Players may hold more than one non-FIFA nationality.

No.	Pos.	Nation	Player
2	DF	BRA	Rodolfo (free agent)
3	DF	CMR	Adolphe Teikeu (on loan from (Ukraine) Chornomorets Odesa)
17	FW	SEN	Ablaye Mbengue (from (Gabon) Sapins)
20	FW	RUS	Adlan Katsayev (end of loan to (Poland) Lechia Gdańsk)
22	FW	SRB	Marko Šćepović (loan from (Greece) Olympiacos, previously on loan to (Spain) Mallorca)
51	GK	RUS	Yevgeni Kobozev (end of loan to Krylia Sovetov Samara)
64	FW	RUS	Radzhab Isayev
88	MF	RUS	Ayub Magamayev
92	FW	RUS	Khalit Saytkhadzhiyev

Out: Note: Flags indicate national team as defined under FIFA eligibility rules; some limited exceptions apply. Players may hold more than one non-FIFA nationality.

No.	Pos.	Nation	Player
5	DF	BRA	Antonio Ferreira (to (Brazil) Bragantino)
28	MF	RUS	Magomed-Emi Shapiyev
30	FW	ROU	Gheorghe Grozav (on loan to (Romania) Dinamo București)
88	MF	RUS	Tamerlan Saidkhadzhiyev
92	MF	RUS	Sulim Didigov

=== Torpedo Moscow ===
In: Note: Flags indicate national team as defined under FIFA eligibility rules; some limited exceptions apply. Players may hold more than one non-FIFA nationality.

No.	Pos.	Nation	Player
4	FW	ISL	Arnór Smárason (on loan from (Sweden) Helsingborg)
19	FW	EST	Sergei Zenjov (from (England) Blackpool)
22	FW	RUS	Konstantin Bazelyuk (loan from CSKA Moscow)
32	MF	RUS	Ivan Melnikov (from own academy)
57	MF	RUS	Filipp Dvoretskov
60	DF	RUS	Viktor Chigiryov (from Meteor Balashikha school)
68	FW	RUS	Roman Drozdov (from Mordovia Saransk academy)
99	DF	RUS	Nikita Cherepanov (from (Latvia) Spartaks Jūrmala)

Out: Note: Flags indicate national team as defined under FIFA eligibility rules; some limited exceptions apply. Players may hold more than one non-FIFA nationality.

No.	Pos.	Nation	Player
12	DF	RUS	Aleksandr Tsybikov (on loan to Zenit Penza)
17	DF	RUS	Mikhail Bagayev (on loan to Tyumen)
25	DF	RUS	Ivan Novoseltsev (to Rostov)
40	MF	RUS	Yuri Kuleshov (to Sakhalin Yuzhno-Sakhalinsk)
55	GK	LTU	Saulius Klevinskas (to (Lithuania) Žalgiris Vilnius)
66	MF	RUS	Daniil Savichev (on loan to Saturn Ramenskoye)
69	MF	RUS	Vladislav Semyonov (to Spartak Nalchik)
88	FW	RUS	Igor Shevchenko (to Ufa)

=== Ufa ===
In: Note: Flags indicate national team as defined under FIFA eligibility rules; some limited exceptions apply. Players may hold more than one non-FIFA nationality.

No.	Pos.	Nation	Player
17	MF	UKR	Oleksandr Zinchenko (from (Ukraine) Shakhtar Donetsk)
39	MF	RUS	Dmitri Stotskiy (from Baltika Kaliningrad)
57	DF	RUS	Ruslan Khaziyev (from Ufa-2)
63	MF	RUS	Radmir Zaripov (from Ufa-2)
66	FW	RUS	Ilya Blinnikov (from Zenit Salavat)
74	DF	RUS	Dmitri Pavlov (from DYuSSh-Olimpiyets-D Nizhny Novgorod)
88	FW	RUS	Igor Shevchenko (from Torpedo Moscow)

Out: Note: Flags indicate national team as defined under FIFA eligibility rules; some limited exceptions apply. Players may hold more than one non-FIFA nationality.

No.	Pos.	Nation	Player
6	MF	BRA	William (released)
7	MF	RUS	Nikita Bezlikhotnov (on loan to Baltika Kaliningrad)
27	MF	JPN	Takafumi Akahoshi (on loan to (Poland) Pogoń Szczecin)
49	FW	RUS	Aleksandr Vasilyev (on loan to Tyumen)
77	FW	RUS	Bulat Khayernasov (released)

=== Ural Sverdlovsk Oblast ===
In: Note: Flags indicate national team as defined under FIFA eligibility rules; some limited exceptions apply. Players may hold more than one non-FIFA nationality.

No.	Pos.	Nation	Player
24	DF	RUS	Denis Fomin (from Tekstilschik Ivanovo)
26	MF	RUS	Aleksandr Shcherbakov
36	MF	RUS	Ilya Korelin
48	DF	RUS	Denis Drozhalkin
50	DF	RUS	Nikolai Markov (on loan from Krasnodar)
51	GK	RUS	Yevgeni Zharikov
64	MF	RUS	Vladislav Zolotukhin
88	DF	RUS	Aleksei Gerasimov (end of loan to SKA-Energiya Khabarovsk)
92	MF	RUS	Roman Yemelyanov (from (Ukraine) Shakhtar Donetsk, previously on loan)

Out: Note: Flags indicate national team as defined under FIFA eligibility rules; some limited exceptions apply. Players may hold more than one non-FIFA nationality.

No.	Pos.	Nation	Player
4	DF	AUT	Markus Berger (to (Portugal) Gil Vicente)
6	DF	ISL	Sölvi Ottesen (to (China) Jiangsu Guoxin-Sainty)
11	MF	RUS	Aleksandr Shchanitsyn (to Tekstilshchik Ivanovo)
15	MF	RUS	Arsen Oganesyan (to Sokol Saratov)
18	FW	RUS	Georgi Nurov (on loan to Baltika Kaliningrad)
19	FW	RUS	Arsen Goshokov (on loan to Spartak Nalchik)
20	MF	RUS	Igor Lambarschi (on loan to Tyumen)
49	MF	RUS	Roman Markelov
60	DF	RUS	Ratmir Kireev
77	DF	RUS	Arsen Omarbekov

=== Zenit Saint Petersburg ===
In: Note: Flags indicate national team as defined under FIFA eligibility rules; some limited exceptions apply. Players may hold more than one non-FIFA nationality.

No.	Pos.	Nation	Player
74	MF	RUS	Sergei Ivanov
84	DF	RUS	Mikhail Kovalenko (free agent)
87	DF	RUS	Artyom Vyatkin (from Lokomotiv Moscow)
93	FW	RUS	Ruslan Suanov (from Dynamo Moscow)

Out: Note: Flags indicate national team as defined under FIFA eligibility rules; some limited exceptions apply. Players may hold more than one non-FIFA nationality.

No.	Pos.	Nation	Player
49	DF	RUS	Denis Terentyev (on loan to Tom Tomsk)
75	MF	ARM	Artyom Simonyan (to (Switzerland) Zürich)
