= 2014–15 Russian Premier League =

23rd season of top-tier football league in Russia

Russian Premier League
- Season: 2014–15
- Champions: Zenit St. Petersburg
- Relegated: Torpedo Moscow; Arsenal Tula
- Champions League: Zenit St. Petersburg; CSKA Moscow
- Europa League: Lokomotiv Moscow; Krasnodar; Rubin Kazan
- Matches: 240
- Goals: 583 (2.43 per match)
- Top goalscorer: Hulk (15 goals)
- Biggest home win: Zenit 8–1 Torpedo
- Biggest away win: Rostov 0–5 Zenit
- Highest scoring: Dynamo 7–3 Rostov
- Longest winning run: 8 matches: Zenit (2 Aug-20 Sep)
- Longest unbeaten run: 13 matches: Zenit (3 Dec-17 May); Krasnodar (8 Mar-30 May)
- Longest winless run: 11 matches: Arsenal (2 Aug-24 Oct); Amkar (3 Nov-7 Apr)
- Longest losing run: 6 matches: Arsenal (17 Aug-28 Sep)

The 2014–15 Russian Premier League was the 23rd season of the Russian football championship since the dissolution of the Soviet Union and the 13th under the current Russian Premier League name.

The season began on August 1, 2014, when Rubin Kazan opened its season at home against Spartak Moscow. The season ended on May 29, 2015. Zenit won the championship, on 17 May, 2 rounds before the season ended.

== Teams ==
Locations of teams in the 2014–15 Russian Premier League

After the 2013–14 season, FC Anzhi Makhachkala and FC Volga Nizhny Novgorod were relegated to the 2014–15 Russian National Football League. Anzhi's relegation was confirmed on 11 May 2014 after losing 0–1 to FC Krasnodar, a result that came one year after the club finished third in the previous season, and thus returns to FNL after five seasons. FC Volga Nizhny Novgorod has been relegated after playing in the Russian Premier League for three seasons, during its first stint in Russia's top division. They have been replaced by two clubs which directly qualified from the 2013–14 Russian National Football League. FC Mordovia Saransk returned to the Premier League at its first attempt as FNL champions in the 2013–14 season, after being relegated from the Premier League in the season before. And 2013-14 FNL runner-up FC Arsenal Tula, which make their debut in Premier League for 2014–15 season, to play in top division of any level for the first time in its 68-year history.

On 18 and 22 May 2014, FC Tom Tomsk and FC Krylia Sovetov Samara also played their relegation playoff matches against FC Ufa and FC Torpedo Moscow respectively. The 2012-13 season FNL runner-up which has been directly promoted to Premier League season before, FC Tom Tomsk lost their relegation playoffs from FC Ufa (4th 2013-14 FNL) with 4–6 on aggregate. Ufa's qualification to the Premier League was all the more impressive considering that the club was founded at the end of 2010 and played its 2011–12 season in the second division. FC Krylia Sovetov Samara were also relegated to play in FNL in 2014–15 season, after they lose from FC Torpedo Moscow (3rd 2013-14 FNL) with 0–2 on aggregate, and the Moscow-based club will return to Premier League for the first time since the 2006 season. FC Krylia Sovetov Samara, as one of founding members of Russia's first division since breakup of the Soviet Union, will be playing outside top division for the first time since 1991.

=== Stadiums ===
Team	Stadium	Opened	Capacity	Average attendance	Notes
Amkar	Zvezda, Perm	1969	17,000	8,275	
Arsenal Tula	Arsenal, Tula	1959	20,048	12,154	
Arsenal Tula	Lokomotiv, Moscow	2002	28,800	2,000	Used as home ground in round 26.
Arsenal Tula	MSA Lokomotiv, Moscow	2009	10,000	1,300	Used as home ground in round 20.
CSKA	Arena Khimki, Khimki	2008	18,636	8,967	
Dynamo Moscow	Arena Khimki, Khimki	2008	18,636	7,336	
Krasnodar	Kuban, Krasnodar	1961	31,654	11,290	
Kuban	Kuban, Krasnodar	1961	31,654	9,228	
Lokomotiv	Lokomotiv, Moscow	2002	28,800	8,822	
Mordovia	Start, Saransk	2004	11,613	5,313	
Rostov	Olimp-2, Rostov-on-Don	1930	15,840	10,059	
Rubin	Kazan Arena, Kazan	2013	45,105	20,066	
Rubin	Rubin, Kazan	1958	10,000	3,682	Used as home ground in rounds 18–27.
Rubin	Central Stadium, Kazan	1960	28,856	20,624	Used as home ground in round 1.
Spartak Moscow	Otkrytiye Arena, Moscow	2014	45,360	25,001	
Terek	Akhmat-Arena, Grozny	2011	30,597	16,822	
Terek	Sultan Bilimkhanov Stadium, Grozny	1946	10,600	8,500	Used as home ground in rounds 18, 24.
Torpedo Moscow	Saturn, Ramenskoye	1999	14,685	3,544	
Torpedo Moscow	Eduard Streltsov Stadium, Moscow	1959	13,450	3,517	Used as home ground in rounds 14, 17, 26–30.
Torpedo Moscow	Otkrytiye Arena, Moscow	2014	45,360	20,147	Used as home ground in round 20.
Ufa	Dynamo, Ufa	1934	5,350	4,183	
Ufa	Start, Saransk	2004	11,613	1,964	Used as home ground in rounds 19–23, 30.
Ufa	Zvezda, Perm	1969	17,000	1,383	Used as home ground in rounds 5, 11, 13, 24–26.
Ufa	Petrovsky, Saint Petersburg	1925	20,985	16,925	Used as home ground in round 28.
Ural	Central Stadium, Yekaterinburg	1957	27,000	9,193	
Ural	Geolog, Tyumen	1982	12,057	5,167	Used as home ground in rounds 23, 27, 28.
Ural	Ural Indoor Arena, Yekaterinburg		3,000	2,640	Used as home ground in rounds 11, 20, 21.
Zenit	Petrovsky, Saint Petersburg	1925	20,985	16,508	

=== Personnel and sponsorship ===
Team	Location	Head coach	Captain	Kitmaker	Sponsor
Amkar	Perm	(Russia) Gadzhi Gadzhiyev	(Russia) Dmitri Belorukov	Joma	
Arsenal	Tula	(Russia) Dmitri Alenichev	(Russia) Aleksandr Filimonov	Macron	Government of Tula region
CSKA	Moscow	(Russia) Leonid Slutsky	(Russia) Igor Akinfeev	Adidas	Rosseti
Dynamo	Moscow	(Russia) Stanislav Cherchesov	(Russia) Aleksandr Kokorin	Nike	VTB
Krasnodar	Krasnodar	(Russia) Oleg Kononov	(Sweden) Andreas Granqvist	Kappa	Constell Group
Kuban	Krasnodar	(Belarus) Andrei Sosnitskiy (caretaker)	(Russia) Aleksandr Belenov	Adidas	RGMK
Lokomotiv	Moscow	(Tajikistan) Igor Cherevchenko	(Slovakia) Ján Ďurica	Adidas	RZD
Mordovia	Saransk	(Russia) Yury Semin	(Russia) Anton Kochenkov	Adidas	Mordovcement
Rostov	Rostov-on-Don	(Turkmenistan) Kurban Berdyev	(Croatia) Stipe Pletikosa	Joma	Energosbyt Rostovenergo
Rubin	Kazan	(Russia) Rinat Bilyaletdinov	(Russia) Oleg Kuzmin	Puma	TAIF
Spartak	Moscow	(Switzerland) Murat Yakin	(Russia) Artyom Rebrov	Nike	Lukoil
Terek	Grozny	(Russia) Rashid Rakhimov	(Russia) Rizvan Utsiyev	Adidas	Akhmat
Torpedo	Moscow	(Russia) Valery Petrakov	(Russia) Kirill Kombarov	Legea	
Ufa	Ufa	(Russia) Igor Kolyvanov	(Russia) Azamat Zaseyev	Joma	Bashinformsvyaz
Ural	Yekaterinburg	(Russia) Aleksandr Tarkhanov	(Russia) Artyom Fidler	Umbro	TMK Group; Renova Group
Zenit	St. Petersburg	(Portugal) André Villas-Boas	(Portugal) Danny	Nike	Gazprom

=== Managerial changes ===
Team	Outgoing	Manner	Date	Table	Incoming	Date	Table
Mordovia Saransk	(Ukraine) Yuriy Maksymov	Mutual consent	18 May 2014	Pre-season	(Russia) Yuri Semin	28 May 2014	Pre-season
Spartak Moscow	(Russia) Dmitri Gunko	Contract expired	1 June 2014	Pre-season	(Switzerland) Murat Yakin	16 June 2014	Pre-season
Torpedo Moscow	(Russia) Aleksandr Borodyuk	Contract expired	5 June 2014	Pre-season	(Russia) Nikolai Savichev	19 June 2014	Pre-season
Amkar Perm	(Russia) Konstantin Paramonov	Caretaker spell over	17 June 2014	Pre-season	(Serbia) Slavoljub Muslin	17 June 2014	Pre-season
Lokomotiv Moscow	(Belarus) Leonid Kuchuk	Sacked	17 September 2014	9th	(Tajikistan) Igor Cherevchenko (caretaker)	17 September 2014	9th
Rostov	(Montenegro) Miodrag Božović	Resigned	25 September 2014	14th	(Russia) Igor Gamula	25 September 2014	14th
Lokomotiv Moscow	(Tajikistan) Igor Cherevchenko (caretaker)	Caretaking spell over	4 October 2014	9th	(Montenegro) Miodrag Božović	4 October 2014	9th
Torpedo Moscow	(Russia) Nikolai Savichev	Resigned	4 November 2014	15th	(Russia) Valery Petrakov	4 November 2014	15th
Kuban Krasnodar	(Belarus) Viktor Goncharenko	Mutual consent	13 November 2014	5th	(Belarus) Leonid Kuchuk	17 November 2014	5th
Amkar Perm	(Serbia) Slavoljub Muslin	Sacked	9 December 2014	14th	(Russia) Gadzhi Gadzhiyev	30 December 2014	14th
Rostov	(Russia) Igor Gamula	Moved to the U-21 team	18 December 2014	16th	(Turkmenistan) Kurban Berdyev	18 December 2014	16th
Lokomotiv Moscow	(Montenegro) Miodrag Božović	Resigned	11 May 2015	7th	(Tajikistan) Igor Cherevchenko	11 May 2015 (caretaker); 2 June 2015 (permanent)	7th
Kuban Krasnodar	(Belarus) Leonid Kuchuk	Mutual consent	25 May 2015	10th	(Belarus) Andrei Sosnitskiy (caretaker)	25 May 2015	10th

Last updated: 2 June 2015

== Tournament format and regulations ==
=== Basic ===
The 16 teams played a round-robin tournament whereby each team plays each one of the other teams twice, once at home and once away. Thus, a total of 240 matches was played, with 30 matches played by each team.

=== Promotion and relegation ===
The teams that finish 15th and 16th will be relegated to the RNFL, while the top 2 in that league will be promoted to the Premier League for the 2015–16 season.

The 13th and 14th Premier League teams will play the 4th and 3rd FNL teams respectively in two playoff games with the winners securing Premier League spots for the 2015–16 season.

== League table ==
Pos	Team	Pld	W	D	L	GF	GA	GD	Pts	Qualification or relegation
1	Zenit St. Petersburg (C)	30	20	7	3	58	17	+41	67	Qualification for the Champions League group stage
2	CSKA Moscow	30	19	3	8	67	27	+40	60	Qualification for the Champions League third qualifying round
3	Krasnodar	30	17	9	4	52	27	+25	60	Qualification for the Europa League third qualifying round
4	Dynamo Moscow	30	14	8	8	53	36	+17	50	
5	Rubin Kazan	30	13	9	8	39	33	+6	48	Qualification for the Europa League third qualifying round
6	Spartak Moscow	30	12	8	10	42	42	0	44	
7	Lokomotiv Moscow	30	11	10	9	31	25	+6	43	Qualification for the Europa League group stage (Note: Lokomotiv Moscow qualified for Europa League group stage by winning the 2014–15 Russian Cup.)
8	Mordovia Saransk	30	11	5	14	22	43	−21	38	
9	Terek Grozny	30	10	7	13	30	30	0	37	
10	Kuban Krasnodar	30	8	12	10	32	36	−4	36	
11	Amkar Perm	30	8	8	14	25	42	−17	32	
12	Ufa	30	7	10	13	26	39	−13	31	
13	Ural Sverdlovsk Oblast (O)	30	9	3	18	31	44	−13	30	Qualification for the Relegation play-offs
14	Rostov (O)	30	7	8	15	27	51	−24	29	Qualification for the Relegation play-offs
15	Torpedo Moscow (R)	30	6	11	13	28	45	−17	29	Relegation to Professional Football League
16	Arsenal Tula (R)	30	7	4	19	20	46	−26	25	Relegation to Football National League

Source: Russian Premier League
Rules for classification: 1) points; 2) number of matches won; 3) head-to-head points; 4) head-to-head wins; 5) head-to-head goal difference; 6) head-to-head goals; 7) number of head-to-head away goals; 8) goal difference; 9) number of goals scored; 10) number of away goals scored
(C) Champions; (O) Play-off winners; (R) Relegated

== Relegation play-offs ==
=== First leg ===
3 June 2015
19:00 OMS (UTC+6)

Tom Tomsk	0–1	Ural Sverdlovsk Oblast
	Summary	Stavpets 83'

Trud Stadium, Tomsk
Attendance: 5,519
Referee: Sergei Ivanov (Rostov-on-Don)

3 June 2015
18:30 MSK (UTC+3)

Tosno	0–1	Rostov
	Summary	Bukharov 88'

Stadion Kirovets, Tikhvin
Attendance: 3,100
Referee: Mikhail Vilkov (Nizhny Novgorod)

=== Second leg ===
7 June 2015
17:00 YEK (UTC+5)

Ural Sverdlovsk Oblast	0–0	Tom Tomsk
	Summary

Geolog Stadium, Tyumen
Attendance: 1,840
Referee: Vladislav Bezborodov (Saint Petersburg)

Ural Sverdlovsk Oblast won 1–0 on aggregate score and remained in the 2015–16 Russian Premier League.

7 June 2015
19:00 MSK (UTC+3)

Rostov	4–1	Tosno
Dyakov 39', 59', 61' (pen.); Azmoun 89'	Summary	Prokofyev 6'

Olimp-2, Rostov-on-Don
Attendance: 15,025
Referee: Sergei Karasev (Moscow)

Rostov won 5–1 on aggregate score and remained in the 2015–16 Russian Premier League.

== Results ==
Home \ Away	AMK	ARS	CSK	DYN	KRA	KUB	LOK	MOR	ROS	RUB	SPA	TER	TOR	UFA	URA	ZEN
Amkar Perm		0–1	1–0	2–0	1–2	1–0	1–1	0–1	2–0	0–3	2–0	2–1	0–0	0–1	2–1	1–0
Arsenal Tula	4–0		1–4	1–2	0–3	0–1	0–2	0–1	1–1	0–0	1–0	1–1	1–3	0–1	1–2	0–4
CSKA Moscow	2–1	2–1		1–2	1–1	6–0	1–0	4–0	6–0	3–0	0–1	1–0	4–1	5–0	3–1	0–1
Dynamo Moscow	5–0	2–2	1–0		1–1	2–2	2–2	2–1	7–3	0–2	1–2	3–0	0–0	3–1	2–0	0–1
Krasnodar	1–1	3–0	2–1	0–2		3–2	1–0	4–0	2–1	2–0	4–0	2–0	2–2	0–2	1–1	2–2
Kuban Krasnodar	1–0	5–1	0–1	1–2	1–1		2–1	0–0	2–2	2–1	3–3	1–0	1–1	2–0	0–2	0–0
Lokomotiv Moscow	3–1	0–1	1–3	4–2	0–0	1–1		1–1	2–1	3–0	1–0	2–1	2–0	0–0	1–0	0–1
Mordovia Saransk	1–0	1–0	0–1	0–1	2–1	0–0	0–0		0–0	0–1	1–3	1–0	1–0	0–2	2–1	1–0
Rostov	1–1	0–1	1–1	2–2	0–2	2–1	0–1	2–1		1–2	2–1	0–1	1–0	2–0	1–0	0–5
Rubin Kazan	1–1	1–0	2–1	1–1	1–2	1–0	1–1	5–0	2–0		0–4	2–1	2–1	1–1	2–1	0–1
Spartak Moscow	3–3	2–0	0–4	1–0	1–3	1–1	1–1	4–2	1–1	1–0		1–1	3–1	1–2	2–0	1–1
Terek Grozny	4–0	3–0	1–2	0–0	0–1	0–0	0–0	1–0	2–1	1–1	4–2		0–1	1–0	1–3	1–2
Torpedo Moscow	1–1	0–1	0–2	1–3	0–3	0–0	0–1	2–0	2–1	2–2	0–1	0–0		2–2	3–1	1–1
Ufa	1–1	0–1	3–3	0–2	0–2	3–2	1–0	1–2	0–0	1–1	1–2	0–1	1–1		0–1	1–1
Ural Sverdlovsk Oblast	1–0	1–0	3–4	2–1	1–1	0–1	2–0	2–3	0–1	1–3	2–0	0–1	0–2	1–1		1–2
Zenit St. Petersburg	2–0	1–0	2–1	3–2	4–0	1–0	1–0	5–0	3–0	1–1	0–0	1–3	8–1	1–0	3–0	

Source: Russian Premier League
Legend: Blue = home team win; Yellow = draw; Red = away team win.

=== Positions by round ===
The table lists the positions of teams after each week of matches. In order to preserve chronological evolvements, any postponed matches are not included to the round at which they were originally scheduled, but added to the full round they were played immediately afterwards. For example, if a match is scheduled for matchday 10, but then postponed and played between days 25 and 26, it will be added to the standings for day 25.

Team ╲ Round	1	2	3	4	5	6	7	8	9	10	11	12	13	14	15	16	17	18	19	20	21	22	23	24	25	26	27	28	29	30
Zenit St. Petersburg	2	1	1	1	1	1	1	1	1	1	1	1	1	1	1	1	1	1	1	1	1	1	1	1	1	1	1	1	1	1
CSKA Moscow	5	3	2	4	7	6	4	3	2	2	2	2	2	4	3	2	2	2	2	2	2	3	3	3	3	3	3	2	2	2
Krasnodar	9	10	6	5	4	7	7	7	6	5	3	3	3	2	2	3	4	4	4	3	3	2	2	2	2	2	2	3	3	3
Dynamo Moscow	1	7	5	3	3	2	3	2	3	3	5	7	6	3	4	4	3	3	3	5	5	4	4	4	4	4	4	4	4	4
Rubin Kazan	14	13	11	12	9	10	8	9	8	8	6	6	9	9	9	9	7	6	6	4	4	5	5	5	5	5	5	5	5	5
Spartak Moscow	3	2	4	2	2	5	2	5	7	7	8	9	8	5	6	6	6	7	7	6	6	7	7	6	6	6	6	6	6	6
Lokomotiv Moscow	8	6	3	6	8	8	9	10	9	9	9	8	7	8	5	5	5	5	5	7	7	6	6	7	7	7	7	7	7	7
Mordovia Saransk	7	8	9	9	11	9	10	8	10	11	11	10	10	10	10	10	10	10	10	10	10	10	10	11	10	10	9	9	8	8
Terek Grozny	4	4	8	8	6	4	6	6	5	6	7	4	4	6	8	8	9	9	9	9	9	9	9	9	9	8	8	8	9	9
Kuban Krasnodar	6	5	7	7	5	3	5	4	4	4	4	5	5	7	7	7	8	8	8	8	8	8	8	8	8	9	10	10	10	10
Amkar Perm	15	14	12	14	15	13	12	12	12	12	12	12	12	12	13	14	14	14	15	15	16	16	16	16	15	13	13	11	11	11
Ufa	11	9	10	11	13	11	11	11	11	10	10	11	11	11	11	11	11	11	11	11	11	13	15	14	12	12	12	14	12	12
Ural Sverdlovsk Oblast	10	11	14	13	14	15	15	15	15	13	13	13	13	13	12	12	13	13	13	12	13	11	11	12	13	14	14	13	14	13
Rostov	13	12	15	15	10	14	13	14	14	15	15	14	14	15	15	15	16	16	16	16	14	12	12	10	11	11	11	12	13	14
Torpedo Moscow	12	16	13	10	12	12	14	13	13	14	14	15	15	14	14	13	12	12	12	13	12	14	14	15	16	16	16	16	15	15
Arsenal Tula	16	15	16	16	16	16	16	16	16	16	16	16	16	16	16	16	15	15	14	14	15	15	13	13	14	15	15	15	16	16

Source: resultados-futbol.com

== Season events ==
=== Arsenal–CSKA game ===
On 16 March 2015, the league decided that the game between FC Arsenal Tula and PFC CSKA Moscow on 21 March 2015 can not be played at Arsenal Stadium due to unacceptable pitch condition. The backup stadium registered by Arsenal with the league for such occasions is MSA Lokomotiv in Moscow, where the game was moved, in effect making Arsenal visitors at their own home game. In protest, Arsenal manager Dmitri Alenichev decided to field the reserves squad for this game. Most of the players from the reserves teams are registered to play in league games, therefore the league could not reverse such a decision. 9 of the 11 Arsenal starters in the game (except for Sergei Kotov and Leonid Boyev) made their Premier League debut in the game. Kotov and Boyev had played in the Premier League for 185 combined minutes before this game. It was also a first game since 21 July 2012 in which one of the teams (in this case, Arsenal) did not play a single foreign player. CSKA won the game 4–1.

== Season statistics ==
=== Scoring ===
- First goal of the season: Artem Dzyuba for Spartak Moscow against Rubin Kazan (1 August 2014)

=== Top goalscorers ===
Rank	Player	Team	Goals	Minutes
1	(Brazil) Hulk	Zenit	15 (3)	2283
2	(Venezuela) Salomón Rondón	Zenit	13	1516
2	(Finland) Roman Eremenko	CSKA	13	2213
2	(Netherlands) Quincy Promes	Spartak	13	2379
5	(Israel) Bibras Natcho	CSKA	12 (7)	2174
6	(Russia) Igor Portnyagin	Rubin	11	2018
7	(Nigeria) Ahmed Musa	CSKA	10	2431
8	(Germany) Kevin Kurányi	Dynamo	10 (3)	1578
9	(Russia) Aleksei Ionov	Dynamo	9	2054
10	(Uruguay) Mauricio Pereyra	Krasnodar	9 (1)	2013

Last updated: 30 May 2015

=== Hat-tricks ===
Player	For	Against	Result	Date
(Russia) Aleksandr Kokorin	Dynamo	Rostov	7–3	2 August 2014
(Israel) Bibras Natcho	CSKA	Rostov	6–0	31 August 2014
(Venezuela) Salomón Rondón	Zenit	Rostov	5–0	20 September 2014
(Venezuela) Salomón Rondón	Zenit	Ural	3–0	7 March 2015

=== Round One Scoring Record ===
In the first round of matches, the 16 clubs (10 of which scored) combined for 34 goals to open the Russian Premier League, a new record that was elapsed even prior to Terek Grozny's home match against Amkar Perm on August 4. Ten of those goals came in Dinamo Moskva's 7–3 victory over FC Rostov.

=== Zenit Saint Petersburg winning record ===
Zenit started the competition with 8 victories in a row, beating the previous record set by FC Rubin Kazan in 2008 with 7.

== Awards ==
=== Top 33 ===
On 24 June 2015, Russian Football Union named its list of 33 top players:

Goalkeepers

1. (Russia) Igor Akinfeev (CSKA)
2. (Russia) Yuri Lodygin (Zenit)
3. (Russia) Sergey Ryzhikov (Rubin)

Right backs

1. (Brazil) Mário Fernandes (CSKA)
2. (Russia) Igor Smolnikov (Zenit)
3. (Russia) Vitali Kaleshin (Krasnodar)

Right-centre backs

1. (Argentina) Ezequiel Garay (Zenit)
2. (Russia) Vasili Berezutski (CSKA)
3. (Croatia) Vedran Ćorluka (Lokomotiv)

Left-centre backs

1. (Belgium) Nicolas Lombaerts (Zenit)
2. (Sweden) Andreas Granqvist (Krasnodar)
3. (Russia) Sergei Ignashevich (CSKA)

Left backs

1. (Italy) Domenico Criscito (Zenit)
2. (Russia) Dmitri Kombarov (Spartak)
3. (Russia) Elmir Nabiullin (Rubin)

Defensive midfielders

1. (Israel) Bibras Natcho (CSKA)
2. (Spain) Javi García (Zenit)
3. (Uzbekistan) Odil Ahmedov (Krasnodar)

Right wingers

1. (Russia) Oleg Shatov (Zenit)
2. (Netherlands) Quincy Promes (Spartak)
3. (Serbia) Zoran Tošić (CSKA)

Central midfielders

1. (Finland) Roman Eremenko (CSKA)
2. (France) Mathieu Valbuena (Dynamo)
3. (Russia) Roman Shirokov (Krasnodar)

Left wingers

1. (Portugal) Danny (Zenit)
2. (Russia) Pavel Mamayev (Krasnodar)
3. (Russia) Alan Dzagoev (CSKA)

Right forwards

1. (Brazil) Hulk (Zenit)
2. (Russia) Igor Portnyagin (Rubin)
3. (Nigeria) Ahmed Musa (CSKA)

Left forwards

1. (Brazil) Ari (Krasnodar)
2. (Venezuela) Salomón Rondón (Zenit)
3. (Russia) Fyodor Smolov (Ural)

== Attendances ==
Rank	Club	Average	Highest
1	Spartak	25,001	40,455
2	Terek	15,626	22,730
3	Zenit	14,307	18,261
4	Rubin	13,550	36,855
5	Krasnodar	11,290	23,700
6	Arsenal Tula	10,907	19,500
7	Rostov	10,439	15,710
8	Kuban	9,894	22,172
9	PFC CSKA	9,460	18,000
10	Lokomotiv Moscow	8,822	14,870
11	Amkar	8,265	12,800
12	Ural	7,744	19,500
13	Dynamo Moscow	7,336	15,351
14	Mordovia	5,326	11,613
15	Torpedo Moscow	3,754	20,147
16	Ufa	3,173	16,925
