= Maksim Lepskiy =

Maksim Lepskiy may refer to:

- Maksim Nikolayevich Lepskiy (born 1992), Russian footballer
- Maksim Stanislavovich Lepskiy (born 1985), Russian footballer
