= Chibirov =

Chibirov (masculine, Russian: Чибиров) or Chibirova (feminine, Russian: Чибирова) is a Russian surname. Notable people with the surname include:

- Aleksandr Chibirov (born 1992), Russian football defender
- Lyudvig Chibirov (born 1932), first President of South Ossetia
