= Yuri Medvedev =

Russian footballer

Personal information
- Full name: Yuri Valeryevich Medvedev
- Date of birth: 3 January 1990 (age 36)
- Height: 1.88 m (6 ft 2 in)
- Position: Defender

Youth career
- FC Arsenal Tula

Senior career*
Years	Team	Apps	(Gls)
2007–2009	FC Dynamo Moscow	0	(0)
2010	FC Plavsk		
2011–2012	FC Arsenal Tula	0	(0)
2014–2015	FC Arsenal-2 Tula	11	(0)
2014–2015	FC Arsenal Tula	1	(0)
- * Club domestic league appearances and goals

Yuri Valeryevich Medvedev (Russian: Юрий Валерьевич Медведев; born 3 January 1990) is a Russian former football player.

== Club career ==
He made his professional debut in the Russian Professional Football League for FC Arsenal-2 Tula on 12 July 2014 in a game against FC Avangard Kursk.

He made his Russian Football Premier League debut on 21 March 2015 for FC Arsenal Tula in a game against PFC CSKA Moscow.
