= Thomas Phibel =

Guadeloupean footballer (born 1986)

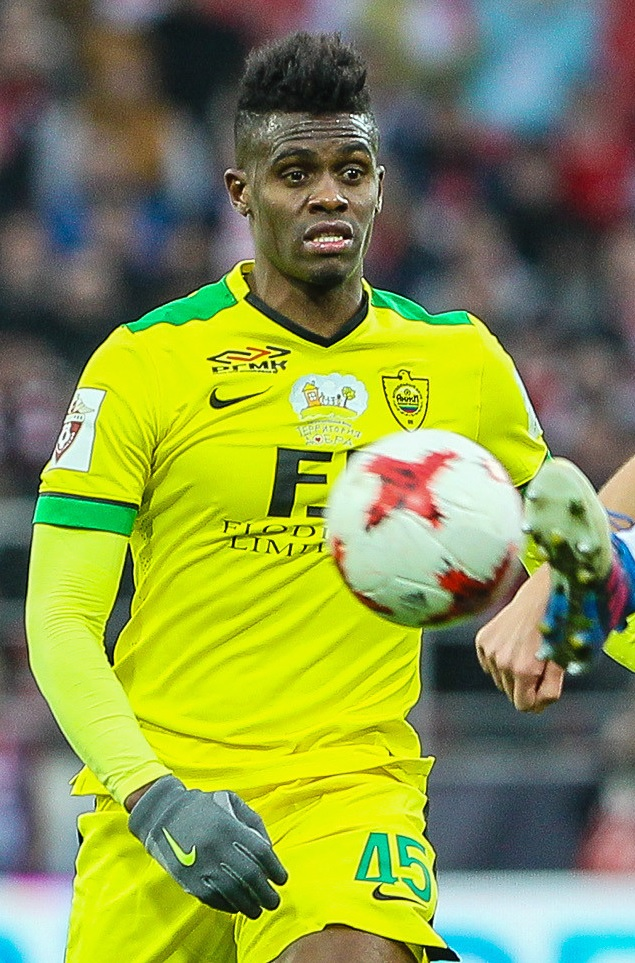
- Phibel with Anzhi Makhachkala in 2017

Personal information
- Date of birth: 31 May 1986 (age 40)
- Place of birth: Les Abymes, Guadeloupe
- Height: 1.92 m (6 ft 4 in)
- Position: Centre back

Youth career
- MJC Abymes
- SCO Roubaix 59
- Lens

Senior career*
Years	Team	Apps	(Gls)
2004–2005	Avionnais	9	(0)
2005–2006	Lens B	2	(0)
2006	Virton	15	(0)
2007–2008	Standard Liège	2	(0)
2008	Brussels	10	(0)
2009–2012	Royal Antwerp	67	(6)
2012–2013	Widzew Łódź	33	(0)
2013–2014	Amkar Perm	30	(1)
2015–2016	Mordovia Saransk	17	(1)
2016	Red Star Belgrade	10	(0)
2017–2018	Anzhi Makhachkala	22	(0)
2019	Palanga	16	(0)
2020	Ararat Yerevan	8	(0)
2021–2022	Meyrin	20	(3)
Total		261	(11)
- * Club domestic league appearances and goals

Thomas Phibel (born 31 May 1986) is a Guadeloupean former professional footballer who played as a centre back.

== Club career ==
Phibel spent the 2008–09 season on loan at Brussels from Standard Liège. He made two Belgian First Division appearances for Standard Liège.

After having his contract with Widzew Łódź terminated, Phibel signed for Russian Premier League side Amkar Perm, before leaving them during the 2014–15 winter break. In early February 2015, Dynamo Moscow was considering signing him, but he failed the medical examination and the signing fell through.

On 3 June 2016, he signed a two-year contract with Serbian side Red Star Belgrade. He made his debut in an official match for Red Star on 12 July, in the first leg of the second qualifying round of the 2016–17 UEFA Champions League in a game Red Star was playing against Valletta F.C. away, he was a starter and Red Star won 2–1.

On 22 January 2017, he returned to Russia, signing with Anzhi Makhachkala.

In January 2018, his Anzhi contract was dissolved following his arrest in the autumn of 2017 in Belgium. The charges for his arrest were not disclosed at the time. Anzhi's director of sports Aleksandr Tantsyura declined to comment further.

In February 2019, he joined Palanga.

On 29 February 2020, Ararat Yerevan announced the signing of Phibel. He left the club again in July 2020.

On 31 May 2021, Phibel joined Swiss club Meyrin.

== Personal life ==
Phibel hails from Les Abymes in Guadeloupe. In November 2008, he caused a deadly accident on the turnpike of Dutch city Maastricht.
