= Vladimir Mazov =

Russian footballer

Personal information
- Full name: Vladimir Vladimirovich Mazov
- Date of birth: 8 March 1981 (age 45)
- Place of birth: Tula, Russian SFSR
- Height: 1.85 m (6 ft 1 in)
- Position: Defender

Senior career*
Years	Team	Apps	(Gls)
1998–2000	FC Arsenal-2 Tula	66	(3)
2000–2004	FC Arsenal Tula	121	(5)
2005	FC Tom Tomsk	2	(0)
2005	FC Khimki	19	(0)
2006–2007	FC Alania Vladikavkaz	37	(3)
2007	FC Salyut-Energia Belgorod	9	(0)
2008	FC Dynamo-Voronezh Voronezh	28	(1)
2009	FC MVD Rossii Moscow	16	(0)
2009	FC Tyumen	14	(0)
2010	FC Neftekhimik Nizhnekamsk	18	(0)
2011	FC Mostovik-Primorye Ussuriysk	16	(0)
2012	FC Amur-2010 Blagoveshchensk	6	(0)
2012	FC Oryol	4	(0)
2014	FC Arsenal-2 Tula	27	(0)
2014–2015	FC Arsenal Tula	0	(0)
- * Club domestic league appearances and goals

Vladimir Vladimirovich Mazov (Russian: Владимир Владимирович Мазов; born 8 March 1981) is a Russian former professional footballer.

== Club career ==
He made his debut in the Russian Premier League in 2005 for FC Tom Tomsk.
