= Vitali Orlov =

Russian footballer

Personal information
- Full name: Vitali Sergeyevich Orlov
- Date of birth: 9 January 1992 (age 34)
- Height: 1.82 m (5 ft 11 1/2 in)
- Position: Midfielder

Youth career
- FShM Moscow

Senior career*
Years	Team	Apps	(Gls)
2009	SC Torpedo Moscow		
2010–2011	FC Chertanovo Moscow (amateur)		
2011	FC Zvezda Ryazan	11	(0)
2012	FC Arsenal-2 Tula (amateur)		
2013–2014	FC Arsenal Tula	15	(0)
2014	→ FC Kaluga (loan)	5	(0)
2014–2015	FC Arsenal-2 Tula	26	(0)
2014–2015	FC Arsenal Tula	0	(0)
- * Club domestic league appearances and goals

Vitali Sergeyevich Orlov (Russian: Виталий Сергеевич Орлов; born 9 January 1992) is a former Russian football midfielder.

== Club career ==
He made his debut in the Russian Second Division for FC Zvezda Ryazan on 5 August 2011 in a game against FC Spartak Tambov.

He made his Russian Football National League debut for FC Arsenal Tula on 2 August 2013 in a game against FC Shinnik Yaroslavl.
