= Predrag Kašćelan =

Montenegrin footballer

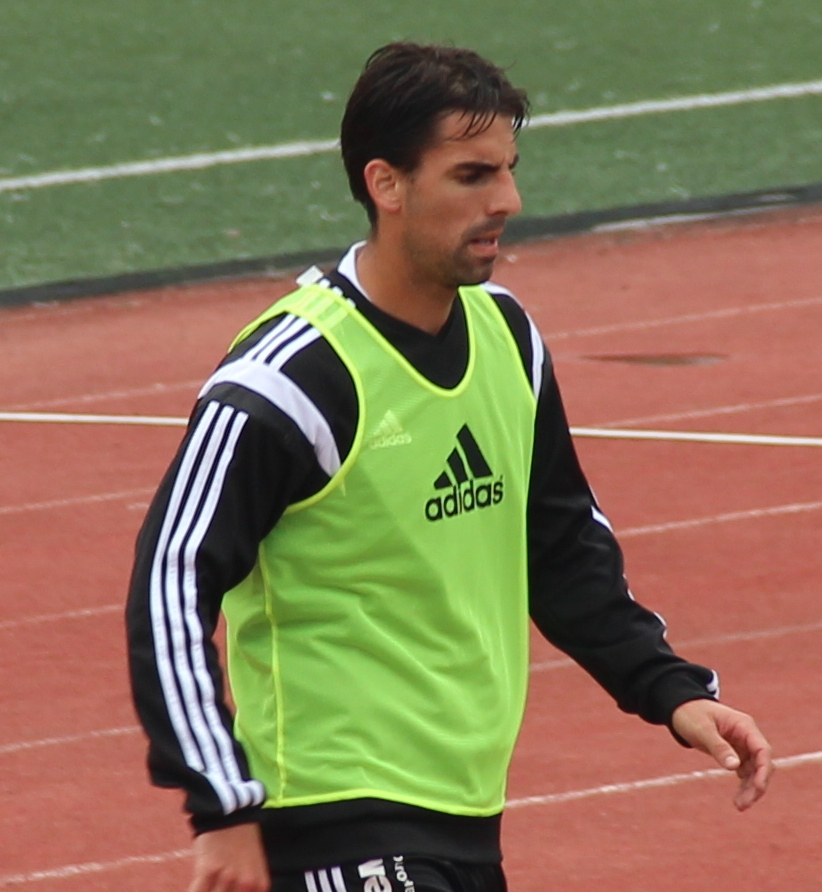

Personal information
- Full name: Predrag Kašćelan
- Date of birth: 30 June 1990 (age 36)
- Place of birth: Cetinje, SFR Yugoslavia
- Height: 1.83 m (6 ft 0 in)
- Position: Centre back

Team information
- Current team: SCM Zalău
- Number: 15

Youth career
- 2004–2005: Bokelj
- 2006–2009: Red Star Belgrade
- 2006–2007: → OFK Beograd (loan)

Senior career*
Years	Team	Apps	(Gls)
2009	→ Spartak Subotica (loan)	0	(0)
2009–2010	Spartak Subotica	0	(0)
2009–2010	→ Palić (loan)		
2010–2012	Bokelj		
2012	Doxa Drama	4	(0)
2013	Mladost Podgorica	19	(0)
2014	Arsenal Tula	3	(0)
2014–2015	Khimik Dzerzhinsk	6	(0)
2015	Vasalund	2	(0)
2016–2018	Bokelj	40	(3)
2018–2019	Grbalj	31	(1)
2019–2022	Rudar Pljevlja	86	(2)
2022–2023	Dečić	5	(0)
2023–	SCM Zalău	4	(0)

International career
- Serbia U17
- Montenegro U19
- * Club domestic league appearances and goals as of 9 October 2022

Predrag Kašćelan (Cyrillic: Предраг Кашћелан; born 30 June 1990) is a Montenegrin footballer who plays for Alga Bishkek as defender.

== Club career ==
He had a spell alongside cousin Mladen at Russian side Arsenal Tula. In August 2020, he extended his contract with Rudar Pljevlja.

== Personal life ==
Predrag is the cousin of FC Tambov midfielder Mladen Kašćelan.
