= Ivan Baklanov =

Russian footballer (born 1995)

Personal information
- Full name: Ivan Aleksandrovich Baklanov
- Date of birth: 6 March 1995 (age 31)
- Place of birth: Aleksin, Tula Oblast, Russia
- Height: 1.76 m (5 ft 9 in)
- Position: Midfielder

Youth career
- CSKA Moscow

Senior career*
Years	Team	Apps	(Gls)
2013	CSKA Moscow	0	(0)
2013–2015	Rostov	0	(0)
2014–2015	→ Arsenal-2 Tula (loan)	22	(1)
2016	Domodedovo Moscow	10	(4)
2016–2017	Sokol Saratov	2	(0)
2016	→ Domodedovo Moscow (loan)	12	(3)
2017–2018	Afips Afipsky	10	(2)
2018	Urozhay Krasnodar	10	(0)
2019	Palanga	10	(1)
2021	Neman Grodno	8	(0)
2022–2023	Belshina Bobruisk	8	(0)
2023	Peresvet Domodedovo	6	(0)

International career
2010	Russia U15	2	(0)
2010	Russia U16	2	(0)
- * Club domestic league appearances and goals as of 12 November 2023

Ivan Aleksandrovich Baklanov (Russian: Иван Александрович Бакланов; born 16 March 1995) is a Russian former footballer.

== Club career ==
He made his professional debut in the Russian Professional Football League for FC Arsenal-2 Tula on 12 July 2014 in a game against FC Avangard Kursk.

He made his Russian Football National League debut for FC Sokol Saratov on 8 April 2017 in a game against FC Kuban Krasnodar.
