= Marat Gubzhev =

Russian footballer

Personal information
- Full name: Marat Vyacheslavovich Gubzhev
- Date of birth: 2 August 1992 (age 34)
- Place of birth: Nalchik, Russia
- Height: 1.76 m (5 ft 9 1/2 in)
- Position: Forward

Youth career
- PFC Spartak Nalchik

Senior career*
Years	Team	Apps	(Gls)
2007–2009	PFC Spartak Nalchik	0	(0)
2010	FC Saturn Moscow Oblast	0	(0)
2011	FC Krylia Sovetov Samara	0	(0)
2013–2014	PFC Spartak Nalchik	0	(0)
2014–2015	FC Arsenal-2 Tula	15	(1)
2016	FC Arsenal-2 Tula	5	(0)
- * Club domestic league appearances and goals

Marat Vyacheslavovich Gubzhev (Russian: Марат Вячеславович Губжев; born 2 August 1992) is a Russian former football player.

== Club career ==
He made his senior debut for PFC Spartak Nalchik on 31 August 2013 in the Russian Cup game against FC Alania Vladikavkaz.
