= Aleksandr Kryuchkov =

Russian footballer

Personal information
- Full name: Aleksandr Nikolayevich Kryuchkov
- Date of birth: 20 July 1985 (age 41)
- Place of birth: Dubovka, Russian SFSR
- Height: 1.75 m (5 ft 9 in)
- Position: Defender

Senior career*
Years	Team	Apps	(Gls)
2003–2005	FC Venyov		
2005–2006	FC Arsenal Tula	34	(5)
2007	FC Tsentrgaz Tula		
2008–2009	FC Spartak Shchyolkovo	42	(6)
2009	FC Olimp Fryazino		
2010	FC Istra	31	(6)
2011–2012	FC Mostovik-Primorye Ussuriysk	34	(2)
2012–2013	FC Arsenal Tula	20	(4)
2014–2016	FC Arsenal Tula	1	(0)
2014–2016	→ FC Arsenal-2 Tula	20	(2)
2016–2017	FC Kaluga	32	(0)
2017–2018	FC Spartak Kostroma	25	(1)
2018–2021	FC Dynamo Bryansk	67	(1)
2021–2022	FC Krasava Odintsovo	26	(7)
- * Club domestic league appearances and goals

Aleksandr Nikolayevich Kryuchkov (Russian: Александр Николаевич Крючков; born 20 July 1985) is a Russian former football player.

== Club career ==
He made his debut in the Russian Premier League for FC Arsenal Tula on 21 March 2015 in a game against PFC CSKA Moscow, he played the full game. The game was moved to Moscow due to unacceptable pitch conditions in Tula and Arsenal's manager Dmitri Alenichev fielded the reserve squad in protest.

He played his next game above the third tier of Russian football on 1 August 2020, when he started for FC Dynamo Bryansk in their Russian Football National League game against FC Orenburg.
