= Andrei Nalyotov =

Russian footballer

Personal information
- Full name: Andrei Vasilyevich Nalyotov
- Date of birth: 31 March 1995 (age 31)
- Place of birth: Domodedovo, Russia
- Height: 1.88 m (6 ft 2 in)
- Position: Defender

Youth career
- 2012–2013: PFC CSKA Moscow

Senior career*
| Years | Team | Apps | (Gls) |
| 2013–2014 | FC Volga Nizhny Novgorod | 0 | (0) |
| 2014–2015 | FC Arsenal Tula | 1 | (0) |
| 2014–2016 | FC Arsenal-2 Tula | 26 | (1) |
| 2016–2017 | FC Domodedovo Moscow | 2 | (0) |
- * Club domestic league appearances and goals

Andrei Vasilyevich Nalyotov (Russian: Андрей Васильевич Налётов; born 31 March 1995) is a Russian former football defender.

== Club career ==
He made his Russian Premier League debut on 21 March 2015 for FC Arsenal Tula in a game against PFC CSKA Moscow.

He played for the main squad of FC Volga Nizhny Novgorod in the Russian Cup.
