= Aleksandr Zakarlyuka =

Estonian footballer (born 1995)

Personal information
- Full name: Aleksandr Arkadyevich Zakarlyuka
- Date of birth: 24 June 1995 (age 31)
- Place of birth: Kohtla-Järve, Estonia
- Height: 1.78 m (5 ft 10 in)
- Position: Forward

Team information
- Current team: FCI Levadia
- Number: 8

Youth career
- 2011–2013: Zenit St. Petersburg

Senior career*
Years	Team	Apps	(Gls)
2013–2014	Zenit St. Petersburg	0	(0)
2013–2014	→ Zenit-2 St. Petersburg	1	(0)
2014	Volga Nizhny Novgorod	0	(0)
2014–2016	Arsenal Tula	1	(0)
2015–2016	→ Arsenal-2 Tula (loan)	22	(1)
2016–2017	Zenit Penza	23	(2)
2017–2022	Narva Trans	159	(37)
2023–	FCI Levadia	63	(3)
2023–	Levadia U21	32	(8)
- * Club domestic league appearances and goals as of 17 November 2026

Aleksandr Arkadyevich Zakarlyuka (Russian: Александр Аркадьевич Закарлюка; born 24 June 1995) is an Estonian professional footballer who plays as a forward for FCI Levadia.

== Club career ==
He made his professional debut in the Russian Professional Football League for FC Zenit-2 St. Petersburg on 15 July 2013 in a game against FC Tosno.

He made his Russian Premier League debut on 21 March 2015 for FC Arsenal Tula in a game against PFC CSKA Moscow.
