= Artur Farion =

Russian football player

Personal information
- Full name: Artur Yevgenyevich Farion
- Date of birth: 27 January 1995 (age 31)
- Place of birth: Tula, Russia
- Height: 1.83 m (6 ft 0 in)
- Position: Defender

Youth career
- –2010: UOR Master-Saturn Yegoryevsk
- 2011–2013: FC Krasnodar
- 2014–2015: FC Arsenal Tula

Senior career*
Years	Team	Apps	(Gls)
2013	FC Kaluga-2		
2014–2017	FC Arsenal-2 Tula	55	(1)
2015	FC Arsenal Tula	1	(0)

International career
2010	Russia U-15	1	(0)
- * Club domestic league appearances and goals

Artur Yevgenyevich Farion (Russian: Артур Евгеньевич Фарион; born 27 January 1995) is a Russian former football player.

== Club career ==
He made his professional debut in the Russian Professional Football League for FC Arsenal-2 Tula on 12 July 2014 in a game against FC Avangard Kursk.

He made his Russian Premier League debut on 21 March 2015 for FC Arsenal Tula in a game against PFC CSKA Moscow.
