= Leonid Boyev =

Russian professional footballer

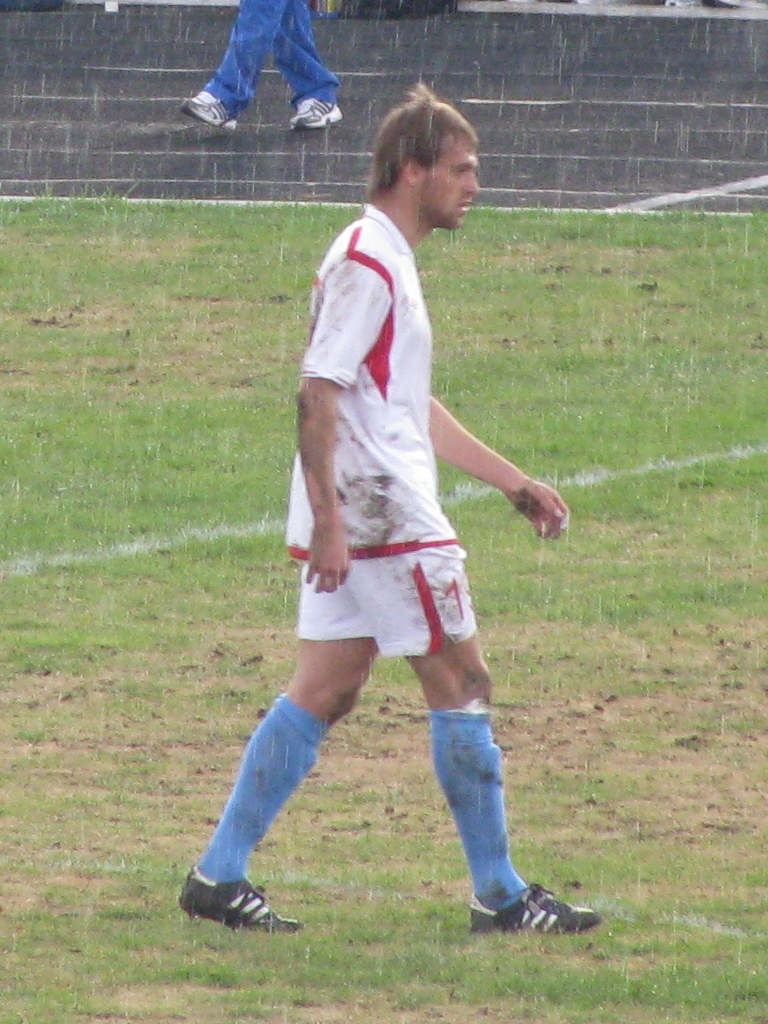

Personal information
- Full name: Leonid Olegovich Boyev
- Date of birth: 19 January 1986 (age 40)
- Place of birth: Tula, Soviet Union
- Height: 1.84 m (6 ft 0 in)
- Position: Striker

Youth career
- FC Krasnodar-2000

Senior career*
Years	Team	Apps	(Gls)
2004–2007	FC Krasnodar-2000	51	(13)
2007	FC Kuban Krasnodar	3	(0)
2008	FC Gubkin	1	(0)
2008–2010	FC Krasnodar-2000	61	(12)
2011	FC MITOS Novocherkassk	14	(2)
2011–2013	FC Khimik Novomoskovsk		
2014	FC Titan Klin		
2014–2015	FC Arsenal-2 Tula	15	(2)
2014–2015	FC Arsenal Tula	1	(0)
- * Club domestic league appearances and goals

Leonid Olegovich Boyev (Russian: Леонид Олегович Боев; born 19 January 1986) is a Russian former professional footballer.

== Club career ==
He made his debut in the Russian Premier League in 2007 for FC Kuban Krasnodar.
