= Andrei Vasilyev (footballer) =

Russian footballer

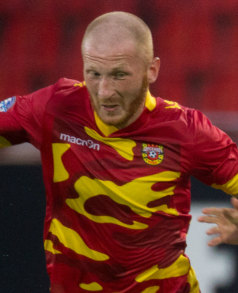

Personal information
- Full name: Andrei Dmitriyevich Vasilyev
- Date of birth: 11 February 1992 (age 34)
- Place of birth: Saint Petersburg, Russia
- Height: 1.84 m (6 ft 1/2 in)
- Position: Defender

Team information
- Current team: Neman Grodno
- Number: 4

Youth career
- 2009–2010: Zenit Saint Petersburg

Senior career*
Years	Team	Apps	(Gls)
2010–2011	Zenit Saint Petersburg	0	(0)
2012–2015	Rostov	5	(0)
2013	→ Dynamo Saint Petersburg (loan)	19	(0)
2014–2015	→ Arsenal Tula (loan)	15	(0)
2015–2016	Zenit-2 Saint Petersburg	26	(1)
2017	Chayka Peschanokopskoye	32	(1)
2018–2019	Torpedo Minsk	38	(1)
2019	Gomel	14	(0)
2020–2024	Neman Grodno	97	(1)
2025	Kyzylzhar	23	(1)
2026–	Neman Grodno	12	(0)

International career
2010	Russia U18	3	(0)
2011	Russia U19	6	(0)
2013	Russia U21	1	(0)
- * Club domestic league appearances and goals as of 3 July 2026

Andrei Dmitriyevich Vasilyev (Russian: Андрей Дмитриевич Васильев; born 11 February 1992) is a Russian professional football player who plays for Neman Grodno.

== Career ==
He made his Russian Premier League debut for FC Rostov on 11 March 2012 in a game against FC Krylia Sovetov Samara.
