= Irakli Chezhiya =

Russian footballer (born 1992)

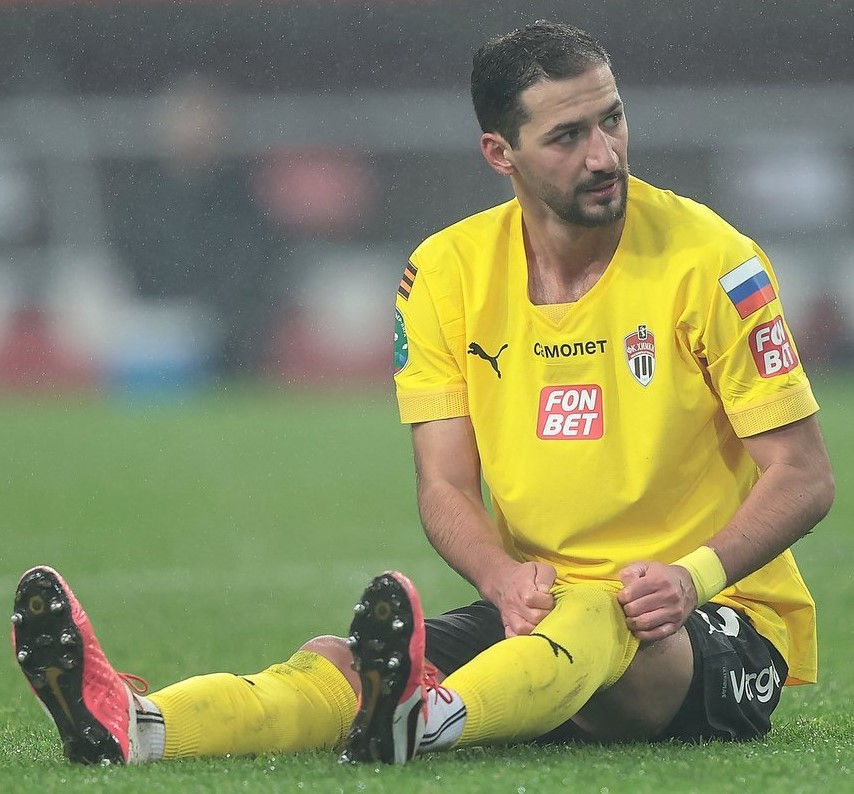
- Chezhiya with Khimki in 2022

Personal information
- Full name: Irakli Robertovich Chezhiya
- Date of birth: 22 May 1992 (age 34)
- Place of birth: Gali, Georgia
- Height: 1.87 m (6 ft 2 in)
- Positions: Defensive midfielder; centre-back

Youth career
- 1998–2012: Spartak Moscow

Senior career*
Years	Team	Apps	(Gls)
2011–2012	Spartak Moscow	0	(0)
2012–2013	Khimik Dzerzhinsk	24	(0)
2014	Kaluga	9	(0)
2014	Arsenal-2 Tula	11	(0)
2015	Ulisses	12	(1)
2015–2016	Torpedo Armavir	19	(0)
2016–2017	Shukura Kobuleti	18	(1)
2017–2019	Olimp Khimki (amateur)		
2019–2020	Olimp Khimki	2	(0)
2020–2022	Olimp-Dolgoprudny	30	(5)
2022–2024	Khimki-M	17	(0)
2022–2025	Khimki	10	(0)

International career
2008	Russia U17	3	(0)
2009–2010	Russia U18	7	(1)
2010	Russia U19	7	(0)
- * Club domestic league appearances and goals as of 3 November 2024

Irakli Robertovich Chezhiya (Russian: Ираклий Робертович Чежия; Georgian: ირაკლი ჭეჟია; born 22 May 1992) is a professional footballer who plays as a defensive midfielder or centre-back. Born in Georgia, he represented Russia at youth level.

== Club career ==
He made his debut in the Russian Second Division for Khimik Dzerzhinsk on 18 September 2012 in a game against Dnepr Smolensk. He made his Russian Football National League debut for Khimik on 13 July 2013 in a game against Baltika Kaliningrad.

He made his Russian Premier League debut for Khimki on 15 October 2022 against Fakel Voronezh.

== Career statistics ==
As of 25 May 2024

Club	Season	League			Cup		Continental		Total	
Club	Season	Division	Apps	Goals	Apps	Goals	Apps	Goals	Apps	Goals
Spartak Moscow	2011–12	Russian Premier League	0	0	0	0	0	0	0	0
Khimik Dzerzhinsk	2012–13	Russian Second League	17	0	1	0	–		18	0
Khimik Dzerzhinsk	2013–14	Russian First League	7	0	1	0	–		8	0
Khimik Dzerzhinsk	Total		24	0	2	0	0	0	26	0
Kaluga	2013–14	Russian Second League	9	0	–		–		9	0
Arsenal-2 Tula	2014–15	Russian Second League	11	0	–		–		11	0
Ulisses	2014–15	Armenian Premier League	12	1	–		–		12	1
Ulisses	2015–16	Armenian Premier League	–		–		1 (Note: Appearance in the UEFA Europa League)	0	1	0
Ulisses	Total		12	1	0	0	1	0	13	1
Torpedo Armavir	2015–16	Russian First League	19	0	2	0	–		21	0
Shukura Kobuleti	2016	Erovnuli Liga	12	0	0	0	–		12	0
Shukura Kobuleti	2017	Erovnuli Liga	6	1	1	0	–		7	1
Shukura Kobuleti	Total		18	1	1	0	0	0	19	1
Olimp Khimki	2019–20	Russian Second League	2	0	1	0	–		3	0
Olimp-Dolgoprudny	2020–21	Russian Second League	22	4	2	0	–		24	4
Olimp-Dolgoprudny	2021–22	Russian First League	8	1	1	0	–		9	1
Olimp-Dolgoprudny	Total		30	5	3	0	0	0	33	5
Khimki-M	2022–23	Russian Second League	4	0	–		–		4	0
Khimki-M	2023	Russian Second League B	7	0	–		–		7	0
Khimki-M	Total		11	0	0	0	0	0	11	0
Khimki	2022–23	Russian Premier League	5	0	1	0	–		6	0
Khimki	2023–24	Russian First League	2	0	0	0	–		2	0
Khimki	Total		7	0	1	0	0	0	8	0
Career total			143	7	10	0	1	0	154	7
