= Aleksei Bazanov =

Russian professional footballer

Personal information
- Full name: Aleksei Vladimirovich Bazanov
- Date of birth: 24 January 1986 (age 40)
- Place of birth: Zheleznogorsk, Krasnoyarsk Krai, Russian SFSR
- Height: 1.85 m (6 ft 1 in)
- Position: Midfielder

Senior career*
Years	Team	Apps	(Gls)
2005–2007	FC Metallurg Krasnoyarsk	71	(14)
2008–2009	FC KAMAZ Naberezhnye Chelny	0	(0)
2008	→ FK Blāzma Rēzekne (loan)		
2008	→ FC Lada Togliatti (loan)	16	(0)
2009	→ FC Metallurg Krasnoyarsk (loan)	25	(8)
2010–2013	FC Yenisey Krasnoyarsk	97	(34)
2013	FC Sibir Novosibirsk	24	(4)
2014–2016	FC Arsenal Tula	21	(3)
2015	→ FC Baltika Kaliningrad (loan)	11	(2)
2015	→ FC Arsenal-2 Tula (loan)	13	(1)
2016	FC Tekstilshchik Ivanovo	1	(0)
- * Club domestic league appearances and goals

Aleksei Vladimirovich Bazanov (Russian: Алексей Владимирович Базанов; born 24 January 1986) is a Russian former professional footballer.
