= Aleksei Skornyakov =

Russian footballer

Personal information
- Full name: Aleksei Sergeyevich Skornyakov
- Date of birth: 16 March 1993 (age 33)
- Place of birth: Dubna, Russia
- Height: 1.86 m (6 ft 1 in)
- Position: Goalkeeper

Youth career
- UOR Master-Saturn Yegoryevsk

Senior career*
Years	Team	Apps	(Gls)
2010	Saturn Ramenskoye	0	(0)
2010	Znamya Truda Orekhovo-Zuyevo	7	(0)
2011–2012	Spartak Moscow	0	(0)
2012	Spartak Shchyolkovo		
2013–2014	Sokol Saratov	23	(0)
2015–2016	Arsenal Tula	0	(0)
2015–2016	→ Arsenal-2 Tula	8	(0)
2017	Torpedo Moscow	0	(0)
2017–2018	Tekstilshchik Ivanovo	2	(0)

International career
2009	Russia U-17	3	(0)
- * Club domestic league appearances and goals

Aleksei Sergeyevich Skornyakov (Russian: Алексей Серге́евич Скорняков; born 16 March 1993) is a Russian former professional football player.

== Club career ==
He made his Russian Football National League debut for FC Sokol Saratov on 19 October 2014 in a game against FC Volgar Astrakhan.
