= Maksim Lepskiy (footballer, born 1985) =

Russian footballer

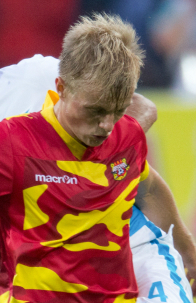
- Lepskiy in 2014

Personal information
- Full name: Maksim Stanislavovich Lepskiy
- Date of birth: 7 December 1985 (age 40)
- Place of birth: Stavropol, Russian SFSR
- Height: 1.80 m (5 ft 11 in)
- Position: Midfielder

Senior career*
Years	Team	Apps	(Gls)
2003–2006	FC Mashuk-KMV Pyatigorsk	52	(1)
2006	FC Dynamo Vologda	0	(0)
2007–2009	FC Mashuk-KMV Pyatigorsk	81	(3)
2010	FC Torpedo-ZIL Moscow	28	(4)
2011–2012	FC Ufa	39	(6)
2012–2015	FC Arsenal Tula	56	(1)
2015–2016	FC Arsenal-2 Tula	5	(0)
- * Club domestic league appearances and goals

Maksim Stanislavovich Lepskiy (Russian: Максим Станиславович Лепский; born 7 December 1985) is a Russian former professional football player.
