= Ivan Lozenkov =

Russian footballer

Personal information
- Full name: Ivan Sergeyevich Lozenkov
- Date of birth: 14 April 1984 (age 42)
- Place of birth: Leningrad, Russian SFSR
- Height: 1.85 m (6 ft 1 in)
- Position: Defender

Senior career*
Years	Team	Apps	(Gls)
2003	Zenit	0	(0)
2004	Zenit-2	25	(0)
2005–2006	Spartak Kostroma	52	(1)
2007	Tekstilshchik-Telekom	28	(0)
2008	Metallurg-Kuzbass	8	(0)
2008	Dynamo St. Petersburg	11	(0)
2009	Smena-Zenit	19	(0)
2009	Dynamo St. Petersburg	12	(0)
2010–2011	Dynamo Vologda	59	(2)
2012	Dnepr Smolensk	8	(0)
2012–2015	Arsenal Tula	55	(1)
2015–2016	Sokol Saratov	20	(0)
2016	Sochi	10	(0)
2017	Kaluga	6	(0)
2020	Zvezda St. Petersburg	9	(0)
- * Club domestic league appearances and goals

Ivan Sergeyevich Lozenkov (Russian: Иван Серге́евич Лозенков; born 14 April 1984) is a Russian former professional football player.

== Club career ==
He played for the main squad of Zenit St. Petersburg in the Russian Premier League Cup.

In October 2009, he received a contusion when a fan threw a firecracker at him from the stands. Early in 2009, he played for the farm club of Zenit called Smena-Zenit and was the team's captain. Zenit fans considered him transferring to the rival Dynamo St. Petersburg team as betrayal.
