= Roman Salimov =

Russian footballer

Personal information
- Full name: Roman Rafekovich Salimov
- Date of birth: 24 March 1995 (age 31)
- Place of birth: Novyi Rozdil, Lviv Oblast, Ukraine
- Height: 1.71 m (5 ft 7 in)
- Position: Midfielder

Youth career
- 2012–2013: Spartak Moscow

Senior career*
Years	Team	Apps	(Gls)
2013–2014	Kuban Krasnodar	0	(0)
2014–2015	Arsenal Tula	1	(0)
2015–2016	Neftekhimik Nizhnekamsk	23	(4)
2016	Oryol	6	(1)
2017–2019	Luki-Energiya Velikiye Luki	41	(3)
2019–2020	Belshina Bobruisk	38	(6)
2021	Slutsk	6	(0)
2021	FC Aluston-YBK Alushta	7	(0)

International career
2014	Russia U19	5	(0)
- * Club domestic league appearances and goals

Roman Rafekovich Salimov (Russian: Роман Рафекович Салимов; born 24 March 1995) is a Russian former football player.

== Club career ==
He made his Russian Football Premier League debut on 21 March 2015 for FC Arsenal Tula in a game against PFC CSKA Moscow.

He played for the main squad of FC Kuban Krasnodar in the Russian Cup.
