= Yevgeni Yezhov =

Russian footballer (born 1995)

Personal information
- Full name: Yevgeni Vladimirovich Yezhov
- Date of birth: 11 February 1995 (age 31)
- Place of birth: Rzhanitsa, Russia
- Height: 1.79 m (5 ft 10 in)
- Position: Defender

Youth career
- –2008: FC FShM Torpedo Moscow
- 2009–2011: UOR Master-Saturn Yegoryevsk
- 2011–2012: FC Dynamo Moscow
- 2012–2014: FC Spartak Moscow

Senior career*
Years	Team	Apps	(Gls)
2013–2014	FC Spartak-2 Moscow	2	(0)
2015	FC Arsenal Tula	1	(0)
2015–2016	FC Torpedo Moscow	18	(0)
2016–2017	FC Arsenal-2 Tula	22	(0)
2017	FC Khimik Novomoskovsk	2	(0)
- * Club domestic league appearances and goals

Yevgeni Vladimirovich Yezhov (Russian: Евгений Владимирович Ежов; born 11 February 1995) is a Russian former football defender.

== Club career ==
He made his professional debut in the Russian Professional Football League for FC Spartak-2 Moscow on 25 May 2014, in a game against FC Oryol.

He made his Russian Premier League debut on 21 March 2015 for FC Arsenal Tula in a game against PFC CSKA Moscow.
