= Ivan Yershov (footballer) =

Russian footballer

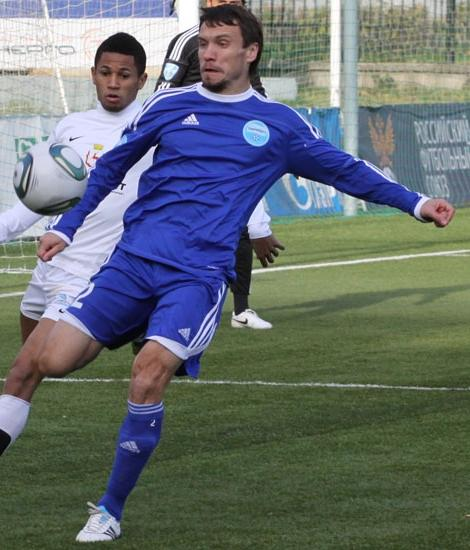
- Yershov in 2011

Personal information
- Full name: Ivan Ivanovich Yershov
- Date of birth: 22 May 1979 (age 47)
- Place of birth: Polyarnye Zori, Russian SFSR
- Height: 1.72 m (5 ft 7 1/2 in)
- Position: Defender

Senior career*
Years	Team	Apps	(Gls)
1997	FC Dnipro-2 Dnipropetrovsk	12	(0)
1998	FC Metalurh Komsomolske	12	(0)
1999–2000	FC Pskov	34	(1)
2001	FC Chernomorets Novorossiysk	17	(0)
2003	FC Lada Togliatti	39	(0)
2004–2006	FC Volgar-Gazprom Astrakhan	104	(1)
2007	FC Metallurg Lipetsk	29	(0)
2008	FC Chernomorets Novorossiysk	39	(0)
2009	FC Volgar-Gazprom Astrakhan	33	(0)
2010–2012	FC Chernomorets Novorossiysk	67	(1)
2012–2017	FC Arsenal Tula	104	(1)
2017–2018	FC Pskov-747	33	(0)
- * Club domestic league appearances and goals

Ivan Ivanovich Yershov (Russian: Иван Иванович Ершов; born 22 May 1979) is a former Russian professional footballer.

== Club career ==
He made his debut in the Russian Premier League in 2001 for FC Chernomorets Novorossiysk. He played 2 games in the UEFA Cup 2001–02 with FC Chernomorets Novorossiysk.

In September 2018, he tested positive for trimetazidine and meldonium, admitted his use and was banned pending further investigation.
