= Yevgeni Alfyorov =

Russian football defender (born 1995)

Personal information
- Full name: Yevgeni Alekseyevich Alfyorov
- Date of birth: 31 January 1995 (age 31)
- Place of birth: Taldykorgan, Kazakhstan
- Height: 1.73 m (5 ft 8 in)
- Position: Defender

Senior career*
Years	Team	Apps	(Gls)
2013–2015	FC Zenit St. Petersburg	0	(0)
2013–2015	→ FC Zenit-2 St. Petersburg	10	(0)
2014–2015	→ FC Arsenal Tula (loan)	1	(0)
2016–2017	FC Zenit Penza	31	(4)
2017	FC Khimki	8	(0)
2018	FC Chayka Peschanokopskoye	14	(0)
2020–2021	FC Dynamo Saint Petersburg (amateur)		
2021–2022	FC Dynamo Saint Petersburg	6	(1)

International career
2013	Russia U-18	2	(0)
2013	Russia U-19	2	(0)
- * Club domestic league appearances and goals

Yevgeni Alekseyevich Alfyorov (Russian: Евгений Алексеевич Алфёров; born 31 January 1995) is a Russian former football defender.

== Club career ==
He made his professional debut in the Russian Professional Football League for FC Zenit-2 St. Petersburg on 15 July 2013 in a game against FC Tosno.

He made his Russian Premier League debut on 21 March 2015 for FC Arsenal Tula in a game against PFC CSKA Moscow.
