= Valery Alshansky =

Russian footballer

Personal information
- Full name: Valery Olegovich Alshansky
- Date of birth: 20 June 1995 (age 31)
- Place of birth: Rostov-on-Don, Russia
- Height: 1.80 m (5 ft 11 in)
- Position: Forward

Youth career
- –2008: FC SKA Rostov-on-Don
- 2008–2009: FC DYuSSh-5 Shakhty
- 2009: FC SKA Rostov-on-Don
- 2009–2013: FC Spartak Moscow
- 2013–2014: FC Krasnodar
- 2015: FC Arsenal Tula

Senior career*
Years	Team	Apps	(Gls)
2013–2014	FC Krasnodar-2	14	(0)
2015	FC Arsenal Tula	0	(0)
2015–2017	FC Arsenal-2 Tula	45	(4)
2017	FC Zelenodolsk		
2017	RO Rostselmash Rostov-on-Don		
2018	FC SKA Rostov-on-Don	11	(1)
2018–2019	FC Aksay		
2019–2020	FC Saturn Ramenskoye	24	(13)
2020–2021	FC Tekstilshchik Ivanovo	24	(1)
2021	FC Zvezda Perm	10	(1)
2022	FC Olimp-Dolgoprudny-2	6	(4)
2022–2023	FC Kosmos Dolgoprudny	17	(11)
2023	FC SKA Rostov-on-Don	14	(2)
2023–2024	FC Sakhalin Yuzhno-Sakhalinsk	45	(10)

International career^{‡}
2010	Russia U-16	1	(0)
- * Club domestic league appearances and goals as of 3 November 2024 ‡ National team caps and goals as of 4 July 2010

Valery Olegovich Alshansky (Russian: Валерий Олегович Альшанский; born 20 June 1995) is a Russian football player.

== Club career ==
He made his debut in the Russian Football National League for FC Tekstilshchik Ivanovo on 12 August 2020 in a game against FC Chayka Peschanokopskoye.
