= Sergey Maslov (footballer, born 1990) =

Russian footballer

Personal information
- Full name: Sergey Yuryevich Maslov
- Date of birth: 3 September 1990 (age 36)
- Place of birth: Moscow, Russian SFSR
- Height: 1.77 m (5 ft 10 in)
- Position: Forward

Senior career*
Years	Team	Apps	(Gls)
2006–2009	FC Moscow	0	(0)
2010–2011	FC Khimki	10	(0)
2012–2016	FC Arsenal Tula	85	(16)
- * Club domestic league appearances and goals

Sergey Yuryevich Maslov (Russian: Серге́й Ю́рьевич Ма́слов; born 3 September 1990) is a Russian former professional association football player.

== Club career ==
He made his professional debut in the Russian First Division in 2010 for FC Khimki.
