= Rinat Timokhin =

Russian footballer

Personal information
- Full name: Rinat Igorevich Timokhin
- Date of birth: 28 February 1988 (age 38)
- Place of birth: Yelets, Russian SFSR
- Height: 1.92 m (6 ft 4 in)
- Position: Forward

Youth career
- UOR Master-Saturn Yegoryevsk

Senior career*
Years	Team	Apps	(Gls)
2006	FC Saturn Yegoryevsk	31	(8)
2007	FC Znamya Truda Orekhovo-Zuyevo	24	(3)
2008	FC Yelets	13	(3)
2008	FC Zvezda Serpukhov	16	(1)
2009	FC Fakel-Voronezh Voronezh	14	(4)
2009	FC FSA Voronezh	7	(0)
2010	FC Metallurg Lipetsk	10	(0)
2012–2014	FC Arsenal Tula	51	(17)
2015	FC Arsenal Tula	1	(1)
2015	FC Arsenal-2 Tula	9	(2)
2015	FC Torpedo Moscow	6	(0)
2015–2016	FC Metallurg Lipetsk	17	(1)
2016–2017	FC Yelets (amateur)		
- * Club domestic league appearances and goals

Rinat Igorevich Timokhin (Russian: Ринат Игоревич Тимохин; born 28 February 1988) is a Russian former professional football player.
