= Denis Nikitin =

Russian footballer

Personal information
- Full name: Denis Aleksandrovich Nikitin
- Date of birth: 5 May 1997 (age 29)
- Place of birth: Pavlodolskaya, Russia
- Height: 1.75 m (5 ft 9 in)
- Position: Defender

Youth career
- –2008: FC Znamya Truda Orekhovo-Zuyevo
- 2008–2015: PFC CSKA Moscow
- 2015–2016: FC Lokomotiv Moscow

Senior career*
Years	Team	Apps	(Gls)
2016–2017	FC Avangard Kursk	15	(0)
2017–2018	FC Tosno	7	(0)
2017	→ FC Orenburg (loan)	1	(0)
2017–2018	→ FC Avangard Kursk (loan)	18	(0)
2018–2019	FC Avangard Kursk	54	(0)
2020	FC Yenisey Krasnoyarsk	1	(0)
2020–2021	FC Dynamo Bryansk	9	(0)
2021–2023	FC Biolog-Novokubansk	55	(2)
- * Club domestic league appearances and goals as of 4

Denis Aleksandrovich Nikitin (Russian: Денис Александрович Никитин; born 5 May 1997) is a Russian former football player.

== Club career ==
He made his debut in the Russian Professional Football League for FC Avangard Kursk on 20 July 2016 in a game against FC Energomash Belgorod.

He made his Russian Football National League debut for FC Tosno on 1 April 2017 in a game against FC Baltika Kaliningrad.
