= Sergei Ignatyev (footballer) =

Russian footballer

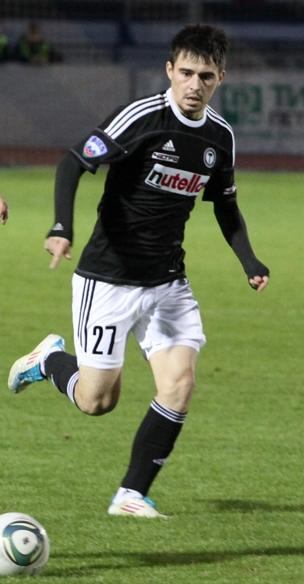
- Ignatyev with Torpedo Vladimir in 2011

Personal information
- Full name: Sergei Vladimirovich Ignatyev
- Date of birth: 9 December 1986 (age 39)
- Place of birth: Chelyabinsk, Soviet Union
- Height: 1.78 m (5 ft 10 in)
- Positions: Midfielder; forward

Senior career*
Years	Team	Apps	(Gls)
2004–2005	Spartak Chelyabinsk	20	(0)
2006–2010	Chelyabinsk	122	(11)
2011	Sibir Novosibirsk	5	(0)
2011–2012	Torpedo Vladimir	19	(0)
2012–2013	Baltika Kaliningrad	17	(0)
2013	Tyumen	9	(2)
2013–2014	Arsenal Tula	41	(7)
2015	Irtysh	5	(0)
2015–2017	Arsenal Tula	15	(0)
2015	→ Arsenal-2 Tula (loan)	5	(0)
2016	→ Arsenal-2 Tula (loan)	4	(1)
2016–2017	→ Sochi (loan)	14	(1)
2017–2021	Chelyabinsk	62	(20)
- * Club domestic league appearances and goals

Sergei Vladimirovich Ignatyev (Russian: Серге́й Владимирович Игнатьев; born 9 December 1986) is a Russian former professional football player.

== Career ==
He made his Russian Premier League debut for FC Arsenal Tula on 2 August 2014 in a game against FC Zenit Saint Petersburg.

In January 2015, Ignatyev signed for Kazakhstan Premier League side FC Irtysh Pavlodar.
