= Mladen Kašćelan =

Montenegrin footballer

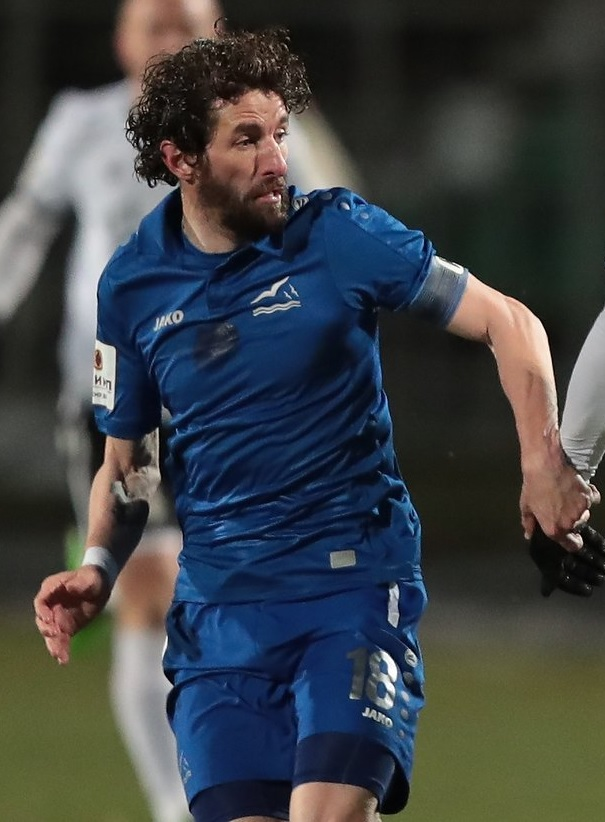
- Kašćelan with Baltika Kaliningrad in 2019

Personal information
- Date of birth: 13 February 1983 (age 43)
- Place of birth: Kotor, Yugoslavia
- Height: 1.78 m (5 ft 10 in)
- Position: Midfielder

Team information
- Current team: Septemvri Sofia (manager)

Senior career*
Years	Team	Apps	(Gls)
2000–2002	Bokelj	54	(1)
2002–2003	Borussia Dortmund II	25	(0)
2003–2004	Karlsruher SC II	6	(0)
2003–2004	Karlsruher SC	2	(0)
2004–2006	OFK Beograd	35	(0)
2006–2007	Voždovac	33	(0)
2007–2009	ŁKS Łódź	44	(2)
2007	→ Stal Głowno (loan)	1	(0)
2009–2010	Karpaty Lviv	7	(0)
2010–2012	Jagiellonia	22	(0)
2011–2012	→ ŁKS Łódź (loan)	11	(0)
2012	→ Ludogorets Razgrad (loan)	11	(1)
2012–2013	Panthrakikos	20	(0)
2013–2015	Arsenal Tula	76	(1)
2016–2017	Tosno	46	(2)
2017–2019	Tambov	60	(2)
2019–2023	Baltika Kaliningrad	106	(4)
Total		559	(13)

International career
2009–2016	Montenegro	25	(0)

Managerial career
- 2023–2024: Pari Nizhny Novgorod (assistant)
- 2025–2026: Sokol Saratov
- 2026–: Septemvri Sofia
- * Club domestic league appearances and goals

Mladen Kašćelan (Montenegrin Cyrillic: Mлaдeн Kaшћeлaн, born 13 February 1983) is a Montenegrin football coach and former player who played as midfielder. He is currently manager of Septemvri Sofia.

== Playing career ==
=== Club ===
In August 2011, he was loaned to ŁKS Łódź on a one-year deal.

In January 2012, he was loaned to PFC Ludogorets Razgrad on a half-year deal.

=== International ===
Kašćelan made his debut for Montenegro in a June 2009 FIFA World Cup qualification match away against Cyprus and has earned a total of 25 caps, scoring no goals. His final international was a May 2016 friendly match against Turkey.

== Coaching career ==
On 3 August 2023, Kašćelan was hired as an assistant coach by Russian Premier League club Pari Nizhny Novgorod.

== Personal life ==
Mladen is married to Serbian model, Marijana Križanović Kašćelan. They got married on June 5 in the luxurious hotel "Splendid" in Montenegro. Many people attending the wedding compared it with the royal wedding that marked the year.

== Honours ==
Jagiellonia Białystok

- Polish Super Cup: 2010

Ludogorets Razgrad

- A PFG: 2011–12
- Bulgarian Cup: 2011–12
