= Sergei Kotov (footballer) =

Russian footballer and coach

Personal information
- Full name: Sergei Vladimirovich Kotov
- Date of birth: 17 March 1982 (age 44)
- Place of birth: Kamyshin, Russian SFSR
- Height: 1.85 m (6 ft 1 in)
- Position: Goalkeeper

Team information
- Current team: FC Dynamo-2 Moscow (GK coach)

Senior career*
Years	Team	Apps	(Gls)
1997–1998	FC Energia Kamyshin	15	(0)
1998–1999	FC Spartak-2 Moscow	28	(0)
2000–2001	FC Khimki	23	(0)
2002	FC Saturn-RenTV Ramenskoye	1	(0)
2003	FC Chernomorets Novorossiysk	0	(0)
2004–2005	FC Saturn Yegoryevsk	31	(0)
2005	FC Khimki	8	(0)
2006	FC Dynamo Makhachkala	2	(0)
2006–2008	FC Zvezda Irkutsk	59	(0)
2008–2010	FC Salyut Belgorod	37	(0)
2011	FC Gornyak Uchaly	16	(0)
2012–2013	FC Khimki	1	(0)
2013–2016	FC Arsenal Tula	23	(0)

Managerial career
- 2017–2019: FC Dynamo Moscow (academy GK coach)
- 2019–2020: FC Dynamo Moscow (U20 GK coach)
- 2020–: FC Dynamo-2 Moscow (GK coach)
- * Club domestic league appearances and goals

Sergei Vladimirovich Kotov (Russian: Сергей Владимирович Котов; born 17 March 1982) is a Russian professional football coach and a former player. He is the goalkeeping coach for FC Dynamo-2 Moscow.

== Playing career ==
He made his debut in the Russian Premier League in 2002 for FC Saturn-RenTV Ramenskoye.

== Coaching career ==
On 9 January 2020 he was promoted to the position of the goalkeeping coach with the Under-20 squad of FC Dynamo Moscow.
