= Arsenal Stadium (Tula) =

Sports venue in Tula, Russia

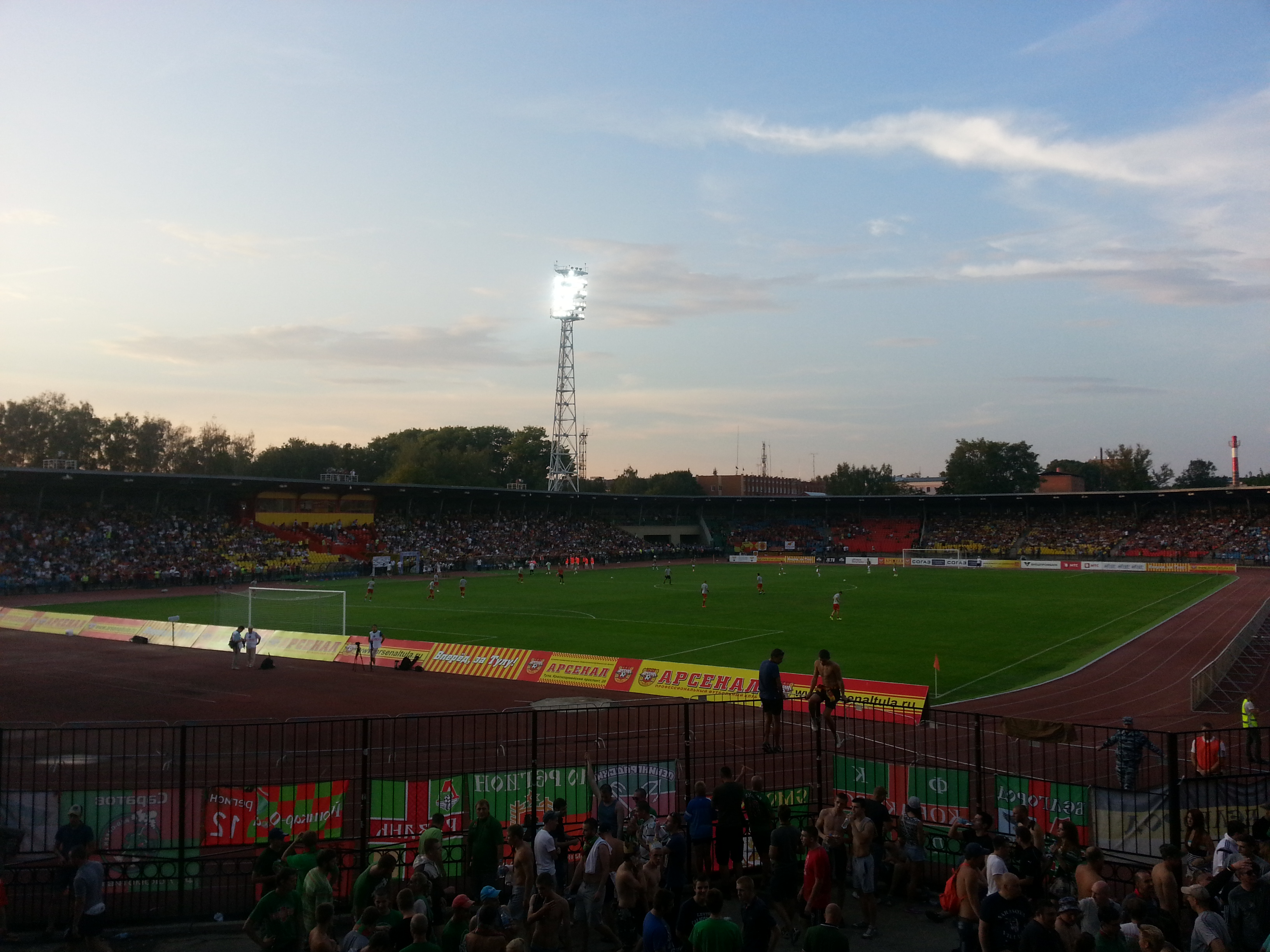
- Stadium in 2014
- Interactive map of Arsenal Stadium
- Location: Tula, Russia
- Coordinates: 54°10′29″N 37°36′09″E
- Capacity: 20,048
- Surface: grass

Construction
- Opened: August 29, 1959
- Renovated: 1996–1998, 2014

Tenant
- FC Arsenal Tula (1959–present)

The Arsenal Stadium is a multi-use stadium in Tula, Russia. It is used mostly for FC Arsenal Tula football matches. The stadium was constructed in 1959 and holds 20,048 people
