= Andrei Polin =

Russian footballer

Personal information
- Full name: Andrei Aleksandrovich Polin
- Date of birth: 8 February 1994 (age 32)
- Place of birth: Moscow, Russia
- Height: 1.76 m (5 ft 9 1/2 in)
- Position: Midfielder

Senior career*
Years	Team	Apps	(Gls)
2013–2014	FC Sportakademklub Moscow (amateur)		
2015	FC Arsenal Tula	0	(0)
2015–2016	FC Tyumen	12	(0)
2016–2017	FC Solyaris Moscow	5	(0)
- * Club domestic league appearances and goals

Andrei Aleksandrovich Polin (Russian: Андрей Александрович Полин; born 8 February 1994) is a Russian former football player.

He made his debut in the Russian Football National League for FC Tyumen on 23 August 2015 in a game against FC Baikal Irkutsk.
