= Aleksandr Chibirov =

Russian football defender

Personal information
- Full name: Aleksandr Alibegovich Chibirov
- Date of birth: 28 February 1992 (age 34)
- Place of birth: Moscow, Russia
- Height: 1.86 m (6 ft 1 in)
- Position: Defender

Youth career
- FC Timiryazevets Moscow

Senior career*
Years	Team	Apps	(Gls)
2010–2011	FC Khimki-2		
2011–2012	FC Timiryazevets Moscow		
2012	FC Sparta Shchyolkovo		
2013	FC Sparta-2 Shchyolkovskiy Rayon		
2013	FC Kolomna	14	(1)
2014	FC Chernomorets Novorossiysk	5	(0)
2014	FC Kolomna	18	(0)
2015	FC Arsenal-2 Tula	17	(2)
2015	FC Arsenal Tula	1	(0)
2016	FC Ryazan	8	(0)
2016–2020	FC Tekstilshchik Ivanovo	71	(5)
2020	FC Ryazan	11	(2)
- * Club domestic league appearances and goals

Aleksandr Alibegovich Chibirov (Russian: Александр Алибегович Чибиров; born 28 February 1992) is a Russian former football defender.

== Club career ==
He made his debut in the Russian Second Division for FC Kolomna on 18 July 2013 in a game against FC Znamya Truda Orekhovo-Zuyevo.

He made his Russian Football Premier League debut on 21 March 2015 for FC Arsenal Tula in a game against PFC CSKA Moscow.
