= FC Arsenal-2 Tula =

- Full name: Football Club Arsenal-2 Tula
- Founded: 2012; 14 years ago
- Ground: Arsenal Academy Stadium
- Capacity: 1,500
- Manager: Aleksandr Shmarov
- League: Russian Second League, Division B, Group 3
- 2026: 15th
- Website: arsenaltula.ru/komanda/arsenal-2

FC Arsenal-2 Tula (Russian: ФК «Арсенал-2» Тула) is a Russian football team from Tula, founded in 2012. Beginning in the 2014–15 season, it started playing in the Russian Professional Football League (third level). It is a farm club for FC Arsenal Tula. It was dissolved after the 2016–17 season. From 1998 to 2002 a different club was called FC Arsenal-2 Tula, that club last competed under the name FC Dynamo Tula. From 2017–18 to 2020–21 season, Arsenal's farm club played professionally as FC Khimik-Arsenal. For the 2021–22 season, it was registered as FC Arsenal-2 Tula once again.

== Current squad ==
As of 11 September 2026, according to the Second League website.

Note: Flags indicate national team as defined under FIFA eligibility rules; some limited exceptions apply. Players may hold more than one non-FIFA nationality.

No.	Pos.	Nation	Player
18	GK	RUS	Mikhail Tsulaya
30	DF	RUS	Maksim Sergeyev
33	MF	RUS	Danila Shramko
34	MF	RUS	Denis Senik
35	GK	RUS	Matvey Kholin
36	GK	RUS	Mikhail Levashov
42	GK	RUS	Aleksandr Melikhov
44	DF	RUS	Oleg Isayenko
45	DF	RUS	Nikita Karmayev
46	FW	RUS	Nikita Pelipenko
47	FW	RUS	Dmitry Gusarov
48	MF	RUS	Artyom Lychagin
49	DF	RUS	Ivan Kochetkov
51	FW	RUS	Klim Zvonaryov
52	DF	RUS	Artyom Kuzin
53	DF	RUS	Denis Grigoryev
56	MF	RUS	Aleksey Kolyshev
57	DF	RUS	Yaroslav Demchenko

No.	Pos.	Nation	Player
59	DF	RUS	Dmitry Zharikov
61	MF	RUS	Aleksey Belyanin
66	GK	RUS	Konstantin Nechkin
67	MF	RUS	Aleksandr Bastrykin
70	MF	RUS	Mikhail Gulyayev
71	MF	RUS	Arseny Yefremov
72	FW	RUS	Maksim Chernov
74	DF	RUS	Kirill Shpuntov
79	FW	RUS	Timur Kim
80	FW	RUS	Nikita Yermoshin
85	FW	RUS	Ilya Annenkov
88	MF	RUS	Dmitry Sushilin
91	MF	RUS	Yegor Knyazev
92	MF	RUS	Artyom Isayev
93	GK	RUS	Gleb Kosteley
96	FW	RUS	Yury Shilov
97	DF	RUS	Yegor Styopin
99	FW	RUS	Yury Sychyov
