= 2019–20 FC Arsenal Tula season =

Arsenal Tula
2018–19 season
- Chairman: Guram Adzhoyev
- Manager: Igor Cherevchenko (until 1 July); Sergei Podpaly (caretaker) (from 1 July)
- Stadium: Arsenal Stadium
- Premier League: 8th
- Russian Cup: Round of 16 vs Ural Yekaterinburg
- Europa League: Second qualifying round vs Neftçi
- Top goalscorer: League: Yevgeni Lutsenko (15); All: Yevgeni Lutsenko (15)
Home colours	Away colours

The 2019–20 FC Arsenal Tula season was the club's fourth season back in the Russian Premier League, the highest tier of association football in Russia, since relegation at the end of the 2014–15 season, and their fifth in total.

== Season events ==
On 17 March, the Russian Premier League postponed all league fixtures until April 10th due to the COVID-19 pandemic.

On 1 April, the Russian Football Union extended the suspension of football until 31 May.

On 15 May, the Russian Football Union announced that the Russian Premier League season would resume on 21 June.

On 17 June, FC Rostov announced that six of their players had tested positive for COVID-19.

On 1 July 2020, Igor Cherevchenko resigned as manager, with Sergei Podpaly being appointed as the clubs caretaker manager.

== Squad ==
As of 22 July 2020

Note: Flags indicate national team as defined under FIFA eligibility rules; some limited exceptions apply. Players may hold more than one non-FIFA nationality.

No.	Pos.	Nation	Player
1	GK	RUS	Artur Nigmatullin
3	DF	RUS	Artyom Sokol
4	DF	GER	Robert Bauer
5	DF	RUS	Aleksandr Dovbnya
6	DF	RUS	Maksim Belyayev
8	DF	GEO	Gia Grigalava
9	DF	RUS	Kirill Kombarov
10	FW	ZAM	Evans Kangwa
11	MF	RUS	Sergei Tkachyov
13	DF	BLR	Maksim Valadzko
14	DF	RUS	Anri Khagush
15	MF	BLR	Yury Kavalyow
17	FW	RUS	Guram Adzhoyev
18	MF	BLR	Valeriy Gromyko
19	GK	RUS	Yuri Lodygin
20	MF	SRB	Goran Čaušić

No.	Pos.	Nation	Player
21	DF	ESP	Víctor Álvarez
22	MF	RUS	Daniil Lesovoy
23	MF	RUS	Igor Gorbatenko
25	MF	ZAM	Kings Kangwa
27	MF	RUS	Aleksandr Lomovitsky (on loan from Spartak Moscow)
28	MF	RUS	Vladislav Panteleyev
29	MF	ZAM	Lameck Banda
36	GK	RUS	Mikhail Levashov
48	FW	RUS	Yevgeni Lutsenko
50	GK	RUS	Yegor Shamov
70	MF	BUL	Georgi Kostadinov
71	DF	RUS	Aleksandr Denisov
77	FW	RUS	Roman Minayev
82	MF	RUS	Daniil Khlusevich
—	MF	RUS	Artyom Mingazov

=== Out on loan ===
Note: Flags indicate national team as defined under FIFA eligibility rules; some limited exceptions apply. Players may hold more than one non-FIFA nationality.

No. / Pos. / Nation / Player; 30 / FW / ROU / Alexandru Tudorie (at Voluntari)	No. / Pos. / Nation / Player

== Transfers ==
=== In ===
Date	Position	Nationality	Name	From	Fee	Ref.
Summer 2019	MF	(Russia)	Ansor Khabibov			
Summer 2019	MF	(Russia)	Yuri Petrovskiy			
16 June 2019	FW	(Russia)	Yevgeni Lutsenko	Dynamo Moscow	Undisclosed	
27 June 2019	MF	(Russia)	Sergei Tkachyov	CSKA Moscow	Undisclosed	
27 June 2019	MF	(Russia)	Vladislav Panteleyev	Rubin Kazan	Undisclosed	
4 July 2019	FW	(Romania)	Alexandru Tudorie	Voluntari	Undisclosed	
7 July 2019	MF	(Serbia)	Goran Čaušić	Red Star Belgrade	Undisclosed	
10 July 2019	MF	(Zambia)	Lameck Banda	ZESCO United	Undisclosed	
10 July 2019	MF	(Zambia)	Kings Kangwa	Buildcon	Undisclosed	
20 August 2019	DF	(Germany)	Robert Bauer	Werder Bremen	Undisclosed	
15 January 2020	MF	(Belarus)	Valeriy Gromyko	Shakhtyor Soligorsk	Undisclosed	
15 January 2020	MF	(Belarus)	Yury Kavalyow	Shakhtyor Soligorsk	Undisclosed	
4 February 2020	FW	(Russia)	Roman Minayev	Avangard Kursk	Undisclosed	
18 February 2020	GK	(Russia)	Yuri Lodygin	Gaziantep	Free	
3 July 2020	MF	(Russia)	Daniil Lesovoy	Zenit St.Petersburg	Undisclosed	

=== Loans in ===
Date from	Position	Nationality	Name	From	Date to	Ref.
4 July 2019	MF	(Russia)	Daniil Lesovoy	Zenit St.Petersburg	3 July 2020	
26 July 2019	MF	(Russia)	Aleksandr Lomovitsky	Spartak Moscow	End of Season	

=== Out ===
Date	Position	Nationality	Name	To	Fee	Ref.
3 July 2019	MF	(Russia)	Danila Buranov	Mordovia Saransk	Undisclosed	
4 July 2019	FW	(Russia)	Artyom Maksimenko	Nizhny Novgorod	Undisclosed	
22 July 2019	DF	(Russia)	Aleksandr Krikunenko	Irtysh Omsk	Undisclosed	

=== Loans out ===
Date from	Position	Nationality	Name	To	Date to	Ref.
29 January 2020	DF	(Russia)	Aleksandr Dovbnya	Rotor Volgograd	End of Season	
6 February 2020	FW	(Romania)	Alexandru Tudorie	Voluntari	End of Season	

=== Released ===
Date	Position	Nationality	Name	Joined	Date
9 August 2019	MF	(Bulgaria)	Mihail Aleksandrov	Arda Kardzhali	2 September 2019
30 June 2020	GK	(Russia)	Dmitri Gerasimov		
30 June 2020	GK	(Russia)	Grigori Kevayev		
30 June 2020	DF	(Burkina Faso)	Bakary Koné	Kerala Blasters	21 October 2020
30 June 2020	DF	(Russia)	Aleksandr Smelov	Kafa Feodosia	
30 June 2020	DF	(Russia)	Anton Ivanov		
30 June 2020	DF	(Russia)	Artyom Sukhanov		
30 June 2020	MF	(Russia)	Ivan Belikov	Kyzyltash Bakhchisaray	
30 June 2020	MF	(Russia)	Kantemir Berkhamov	Kuban-Holding Pavlovskaya	
30 June 2020	MF	(Russia)	Yaroslav Ivakin	Tver	
30 June 2020	MF	(Russia)	Timur Lobanov		
30 June 2020	MF	(Russia)	Dmitri Malikov		
30 June 2020	MF	(Russia)	Emrakh Nabatov		
30 June 2020	MF	(Russia)	Maksim Petrov		
31 July 2020	GK	(Russia)	Yuri Lodygin	PAS Giannina	20 January 2021
31 July 2020	DF	(Belarus)	Maksim Valadzko	Tambov	14 October 2020
31 July 2020	DF	(Spain)	Víctor Álvarez	Pafos	28 January 2021

== Friendlies ==
20 June 2019	Arsenal Tula	0 – 4	Avangard Kursk	Tula
17:00 MSK (UTC+3)		Report	Fedchuk 16'; Gotsuk 25'; Mashukov 43'; Minayev 73'	Stadium: Arsenal Stadium

23 June 2019	Arsenal Tula	0 – 0	Luch Vladivostok
17:00 MSK (UTC+3)		Report

29 June 2019	Arsenal Tula (Russia)	3 – 1	(Austria) Wacker Innsbruck	Austria
17:30 MSK (UTC+3)	Tkachyov 12', 40'; Kangwa 38'	Report	Satin 63'

2 July 2019	Arsenal Tula (Russia)	0 – 0	(Czech Republic) 1. FK Příbram	Austria
17:30 MSK (UTC+3)		Report

6 July 2019	Arsenal Tula (Russia)	1 – 1	(Austria) Red Bull Salzburg	Austria
17:00 MSK (UTC+3)	Tkachyov 45+3'	Report	Haaland 90'

22 January 2020	Arsenal Tula (Russia)	1 – 2	(Azerbaijan) Keşla	Antalya, Turkey
17:00 MSK (UTC+3)	Christovão 70'	Report	K.Kangwa 74'; Minayev 81'

23 January 2020	Arsenal Tula (Russia)	1 – 0	(Romania) Sepsi OSK	Antalya, Turkey
17:00 MSK (UTC+3)	Dovbnya 50'	Report

25 January 2020	Arsenal Tula (Russia)	1 – 1	(Poland) Korona Kielce	Antalya, Turkey
17:30 MSK (UTC+3)	Gardawski 52' (o.g.)	Report	Čečarić 75'

26 January 2020	Arsenal Tula (Russia)	2 – 2	(Serbia) Mladost Lučani	Antalya, Turkey
17:00 MSK (UTC+3)	Tkachyov 22'; E.Kangwa 39'	Report	Bojović 53', 67'

4 February 2020	Arsenal Tula (Russia)	1 – 1	(Czech Republic) 1. FK Příbram	Antalya, Turkey
17:00 MSK (UTC+3)	Lomovitsky 38'	Report	M.Cmiljanovic (red card) 45'; K.Soldat (yellow card) (yellow-red card) 58'; M.Novy 73'

12 February 2020	Arsenal Tula (Russia)	0 – 2	(Romania) UTA Arad	Antalya, Turkey
11:00 MSK (UTC+3)		Report	V.Buhacianu 19'; C.Bustea 25'

12 February 2020	Arsenal Tula (Russia)	2 – 3	(Belarus) Shakhtyor Soligorsk	Antalya, Turkey
17:00 MSK (UTC+3)	Lutsenko 18'; Čaušić 48'	Report	Kendysh 28'; Bodul 34', 45'

20 February 2020	Arsenal Tula (Russia)	2 – 0	(Kazakhstan) Ordabasy	Antalya, Turkey
17:00 MSK (UTC+3)	Kostadinov 16'; Minayev 67'	Report

23 February 2020	Arsenal Tula (Russia)	1 – 1	(Kazakhstan) Astana	Antalya, Turkey
17:00 MSK (UTC+3)	28'	Report	Sigurjónsson 7'; (red card) 68'

24 February 2020	Arsenal Tula	2 – 0	Alania Vladikavkaz	Antalya, Turkey
17:00 MSK (UTC+3)	28'	Report	K.Kangwa 14'; Panteleyev 47'

== Competitions ==
=== Premier League ===
==== Results by round ====
Round	1	2	3	4	5	6	7	8	9	10	11	12	13	14	15	16	17	18	19	20	21	22	23	24	25	26	27	28	29	30
Ground	H	A	H	A	H	A	H	H	A	H	A	A	H	A	A	H	H	A	H	A	A	H	H	A	H	A	H	H	A	A
Result	D	W	L	W	W	L	W	L	L	D	L	L	D	D	W	L	L	W	W	W	L	L	L	L	L	W	L	W	W	D
Position	8	3	8	7	5	8	7	7	7	7	8	7	11	10	6	7	9	7	6	6	6	7	9	9	11	10	11	10	7	8

Updated to match(es) played on 22 July 2020. Source: See Results
A = Away; H = Home; W = Win; D = Draw; L = Loss

==== Results ====
12 July 2019 1	Arsenal Tula	1 – 1	Dynamo Moscow	Tula
20:00 MSK (UTC+3)	Grigalava 84'	Report	Cardoso 16' (yellow card) 41'; Pliyev (yellow card) 58'; Yevgenyev (yellow card) 61'	Stadium: Arsenal Stadium; Attendance: 14,742; Referee: Sergey Lapochkin

20 July 2019 2	Krylia Sovetov	2 – 3	Arsenal Tula	Samara
16:30 MSK (UTC+3)	Sobolev 43' (yellow card) 90+6'; Burlak 56'; Mijailović (yellow card) 59'; Kabutov (yellow card) 72'	Report	Tkachyov 22' (yellow card) 90+5'; Kangwa 24' (yellow card) 55'; Tudorie 52'; Lutsenko (yellow card) 82'; Álvarez (yellow card) 90+1'; Grigalava (yellow card) 90+6'	Stadium: Samara Arena; Attendance: 15,780; Referee: Pavel Kukuyan

28 July 2019 3	Arsenal Tula	2 – 3	Rostov	Tula
16:30 MSK (UTC+3)	Grigalava (yellow card) 11'; Kostadinov (yellow card) 37'; Lutsenko 67'; Gorbatenko (yellow card) 80'; Čaušić 90+4'	Report	Eremenko 21'; Kozlov (yellow card) 27'; Popov (yellow card) 47'; Ionov 49'; Bayramyan (yellow card) 57'; Shomurodov 81'	Stadium: Arsenal Stadium; Attendance: 9,654; Referee: Aleksei Matyunin

4 August 2019 4	Tambov	0 – 1	Arsenal Tula	Saransk
16:30 MSK (UTC+3)	Oyewole (yellow card) 25'; Ciupercă (yellow card) 53'; Appayev (yellow card) 65'; Tetrashvili (yellow card) 90'	Report	Lutsenko 13'; Denisov (yellow card) 42'; Lomovitsky (yellow card) 50'	Stadium: Mordovia Arena; Attendance: 4,332; Referee: Sergey Ivanov
Note: Match played at the Mordovia Arena in Saransk instead of Tambov's regular Spartak Stadium.

11 August 2019 5	Arsenal Tula	1 – 0	Ufa	Tula
14:00 MSK (UTC+3)	Lomovitsky (yellow card) 21'; Álvarez 28'	Report	Carp (yellow card) 70'	Stadium: Arsenal Stadium; Attendance: 11,340; Referee: Mikhail Vilkov

18 August 2019 6	Rubin Kazan	1 – 0	Arsenal Tula	Kazan
14:00 MSK (UTC+3)	Markov 72'; Uremović (yellow card) 76'; Mikeltadze (yellow card) 89'	Report	Álvarez (yellow card) 74'; Grigalava (yellow card) 85'	Stadium: Kazan Arena; Attendance: 10,022; Referee: Vladislav Bezborodov

25 August 2019 7	Arsenal Tula	2 – 1	Orenburg	Tula
21:30 MSK (UTC+3)	Lomovitsky 23'; Lutsenko 69'	Report	Despotović (yellow card) 21' (goal) 52'	Stadium: Arsenal Stadium; Attendance: 8,347; Referee: Aleksey Sukhoy

1 September 2019 8	Arsenal Tula	1 – 2	CSKA Moscow	Tula
16:30 MSK (UTC+3)	Lesovoy 10'; Čaušić (yellow card) 38'; Lomovitsky (yellow card) 73'	Report	Akhmetov 17'; Oblyakov (yellow card) 49'; Gogoua 74'	Stadium: Arsenal Stadium; Attendance: 18,758; Referee: Evgeny Turbin

13 September 2019 9	Zenit St.Petersburg	3 – 1	Arsenal Tula	Saint Petersburg
20:00 MSK (UTC+3)	Dzyuba 6'; Azmoun (penalty missed) 22' (yellow card) 75'; Driussi 66' (pen.); Shatov 88'	Report	Denisov (yellow card) 39'; Bauer (yellow card) 42'; Berkhamov 56'; Lutsenko (yellow card) 67'	Stadium: Krestovsky Stadium; Attendance: 42,431; Referee: Pavel Kukyan

22 September 2019 10	Arsenal Tula	1 – 1	Ural Yekaterinburg	Tula
16:30 MSK (UTC+3)	Gorbatenko (yellow card) 3'; Bauer 25'	Report	Augustyniak 48'; El Kabir (penalty missed) 76'; Ilyin (yellow card) 90+3'	Stadium: Arsenal Stadium; Attendance: 7,256; Referee: Vitali Meshkov

29 September 2019 11	Krasnodar	2 – 0	Arsenal Tula	Krasnodar
19:00 MSK (UTC+3)	Ari 38' (pen.); Olsson (yellow card) 45'; Suleymanov 63'; Vilhena (red card) 90+2'; Martynovich (yellow card) 90+6'	Report	Lomovitsky (yellow card) 43'	Stadium: Krasnodar Stadium; Attendance: 23,516; Referee: Vasili Kazartsev

6 October 2019 12	Lokomotiv Moscow	2 – 1	Arsenal Tula	Moscow
14:00 MSK (UTC+3)	Eder 9'; Ignatyev (yellow card) 22'; Barinov (yellow card) 50'; Al.Miranchuk 45+2' (pen.)	Report	Kangwa 11'; Levashov (yellow card) 45+1'; Álvarez (yellow card) 61'; Kostadinov (yellow card) 64'; Lomovitsky (yellow card) 73'; Grigalava (yellow card) 82'	Stadium: RZD Arena; Attendance: 11,204; Referee: Sergey Lapochkin

20 October 2019 13	Arsenal Tula	1 – 1	Sochi	Tula
16:30 MSK (UTC+3)	Lutsenko (penalty missed) 27' (yellow card) 31'; Bauer (yellow card) 42'; Lomovitsky 43' (pen.) (penalty missed) 54'; Kangwa (yellow card) 57'; Belyayev (yellow card) 60'	Report	Zabolotny (yellow card) 1'; Mostovoy 6'; Kudryashov (yellow card) 42' (yellow-red card) 64'; Kalugin (yellow card) 45+1'; Miladinović (yellow card) 62'; Burmistrov (yellow card) 66'	Stadium: Arsenal Stadium; Attendance: 11,475; Referee: Vitali Meshkov

26 October 2019 14	Akhmat Grozny	1 – 1	Arsenal Tula	Grozny
19:00 MSK (UTC+3)	Semyonov 20'; Roshi (yellow card) 79' (yellow-red card) 84'; Shvets (yellow card) 88'; Utsiyev (yellow card) 90+3'	Report	Lomovitsky (yellow card) 18'; Kostadinov (yellow card) 23'; Álvarez (yellow card) 29'; Kangwa 76'	Stadium: Akhmat-Arena; Attendance: 11,265; Referee: Nikolay Voloshin

4 November 2019 15	Spartak Moscow	0 – 1	Arsenal Tula	Moscow
19:00 MSK (UTC+3)	Umyarov (yellow card) 86'	Report	Lutsenko 16' (yellow card) 30'; Denisov (yellow card) 60'	Stadium: Otkritie Arena; Attendance: 19,310; Referee: Aleksey Sukhoy

10 November 2019 16	Arsenal Tula	0 – 1	Zenit St.Petersburg	Tula
14:00 MSK (UTC+3)	Álvarez (yellow card) 54'; Tkachyov (yellow card) 69'	Report	Karavayev (yellow card) 23'; Azmoun 63'	Stadium: Arsenal Stadium; Attendance: 16,095; Referee: Aleksei Eskov

24 November 2019 17	Arsenal Tula	1 – 2	Krasnodar	Tula
16:30 MSK (UTC+3)	Álvarez (yellow card) 24'; Lutsenko 43'; Shamov (yellow card) 62'; Grigalava (yellow card) 90+4'	Report	Vilhena 7' (yellow card) 67'; Martynovich (yellow card) 16'; Petrov 25'; Berg (yellow card) 26'; Utkin (yellow card) 61'; Ignatyev (penalty missed) 63' (yellow card) 90+2'	Stadium: Arsenal Stadium; Attendance: 7,815; Referee: Stanislav Vasilyev

2 December 2019 18	CSKA Moscow	0 – 1	Arsenal Tula	Moscow
19:30 MSK (UTC+3)	Diveyev (yellow card) 90+4'	Report	Kombarov (yellow card) 24'; Lesovoy 52' (yellow card) 84'	Stadium: VEB Arena; Attendance: 8,112; Referee: Nikolay Voloshin

6 December 2019 19	Arsenal Tula	4 – 0	Lokomotiv Moscow	Tula
19:30 MSK (UTC+3)	Grigalava (yellow card) 43'; Gorbatenko 48'; Lutsenko 63', 78'; Čaušić 83'	Report	Barinov (yellow card) 29'; Krychowiak (yellow card) 50'; Rybus (yellow card) 65' (yellow-red card) 73'	Stadium: Arsenal Stadium; Attendance: 10,284; Referee: Sergey Ivanov

1 March 2019 20	Sochi	1 – 2	Arsenal Tula	Sochi
19:00 MSK (UTC+3)	Burmistrov (yellow card) 28'; Zaika (yellow card) 51'; Kokorin 64'	Report	Lutsenko 5', 90+5'; Kostadinov (yellow card) 74'; Levashov (yellow card) 90+4'	Stadium: Fisht Olympic Stadium; Attendance: 5,720; Referee: Vladislav Bezborodov

7 March 2020 21	Orenburg	2 – 0	Arsenal Tula	Orenburg
14:00 MSK (UTC+3)	Despotović 13', 77'; Kuat (yellow card) 51'; Fameyeh (yellow card) 81'; Ayupov (yellow card) 90'	Report	Grigalava (yellow card) 16'; Čaušić (yellow card) 44'; Lomovitsky (yellow card) 50'; Bauer (yellow card) 65' (yellow-red card) 74'; Kombarov (yellow card) 70'	Stadium: Gazovik Stadium; Attendance: 2,457; Referee: Pavel Kukuyan

14 March 2020 22	Arsenal Tula	0 – 1	Rubin Kazan	Tula
19:00 MSK (UTC+3)	Denisov (yellow card) 47'; Tkachyov (yellow card) 65'; Čaušić (yellow card) 90+3'	Report	Davitashvili 43' (yellow card) 79'; Makarov (yellow card) 45' (yellow-red card) 55'; Podberyozkin (yellow card) 48'; Ignatyev (yellow card) 52'	Stadium: Arsenal Stadium; Attendance: 8,831; Referee: Sergey Lapochkin

20 June 2020 23	Arsenal Tula	2 – 3	Spartak Moscow	Tula
16:30 MSK (UTC+3)	Tkachyov (yellow card) 68'; Kavalyow (yellow card) 72'; Banda (yellow card) 90+1'; Lutsenko 90+4'; Lesovoy (penalty missed) 90+8' 90+9'	Report	Gigot (yellow card) 3'; Sobolev (yellow card) 28' (goal) 44'; Ayrton (yellow card) 42'; Bakayev (yellow card) 45+4'; Rasskazov 66'; Ponce 79'; Dzhikiya (yellow card) 90+5'; Yeshchenko (yellow card) 90+5'	Stadium: Arsenal Stadium; Referee: Evgeny Turbin
Note: Match originally scheduled for 21 March, but postponed on 17 March due to the COVID-19 pandemic.

27 June 2020 24	Rostov	2 – 1	Arsenal Tula	Rostov-on-Don
20:00 MSK (UTC+3)	Mamayev 1'; Ionov 17'; Glebov (yellow card) 62'; Kozlov (yellow card) 66'; Proshlyakov (yellow card) 76' (yellow-red card) 90+5'	Report	Denisov (yellow card) 10'; Lesovoy (yellow card) 57'; Lutsenko 58'; Gorbatenko (yellow card) 70'; Kavalyow (yellow card) 77'; K.Kangwa (yellow card) 90'	Stadium: Rostov Arena; Referee: Vladimir Moskalev
Note: Match originally scheduled for 4 April, but postponed on 17 March due to the COVID-19 pandemic.

1 July 2020 25	Arsenal Tula	1 – 3	Akhmat Grozny	Tula
17:30 MSK (UTC+3)	Kostadinov (yellow card) 15'; Khagush (yellow card) 24'; Lutsenko 90+2'	Report	Kharin 15' (yellow card) 24'; Roshi 22' (pen.), 88'; Bogosavac (yellow card) 33'; Glushakov (yellow card) 69'; Ivanov (yellow card) 71'	Stadium: Arsenal Stadium; Referee: Vasiliy Kazartsev
Note: Match originally scheduled for 12 April, but postponed on 1 April due to the COVID-19 pandemic.

4 July 2020 26	Dynamo Moscow	0 – 1	Arsenal Tula	Moscow
16:30 MSK (UTC+3)	Yusupov (yellow card) 38'; Igboun (yellow card) 50'	Report	Lutsenko 17'; Kombarov (yellow card) 20' (yellow-red card) 35'; Álvarez (yellow card) 28'; Kostadinov (yellow card) 36'; Lesovoy (yellow card) 81'; Khlusevich (yellow card) 84'; Minayev (yellow card) 90'; Shamov (yellow card) 90+3'	Stadium: VTB Arena; Referee: Vladislav Bezborodov
Note: Match originally scheduled for 18 April, but postponed on 1 April due to the COVID-19 pandemic.

7 July 2020 27	Arsenal Tula	2 – 4	Krylia Sovetov	Tula
20:30 MSK (UTC+3)	Denisov 8'; Lesovoy (yellow card) 42'; Kostadinov (yellow card) 50'; Čaušić (yellow card) 56'; Lutsenko 79'	Report	Chicherin (yellow card) 11'; Timofeyev (yellow card) 19'; Kombarov (yellow card) 32'; Lystsov 38' (yellow card) 41'; Popović 57'; Glushenkov 62'; Radonjić 69'; Chernov (yellow card) 83'	Stadium: Arsenal Stadium; Referee: Mikhail Vilkov
Note: Match originally scheduled for 25 April, but postponed on 1 April due to the COVID-19 pandemic.

11 July 2020 28	Arsenal Tula	2 – 1	Tambov	Tula
16:00 MSK (UTC+3)	Kostadinov (yellow card) 8'; Panteleyev 20' (pen.) (yellow card) 71'; Lutsenko 84'	Report	Tetrashvili (yellow card) 18'; Kostyukov 55'	Stadium: Arsenal Stadium; Referee: Pavel Kukuyan
Note: Match originally scheduled for 1 May, but postponed on 1 April due to the COVID-19 pandemic.

15 July 2020 29	Ural Yekaterinburg	1 – 3	Arsenal Tula	Yekaterinburg
16:00 MSK (UTC+3)	Kulakov (yellow card) 32'; Bicfalvi 38'; Zolotov (yellow card) 73'; Pogrebnyak (yellow card) 86'	Report	Khlusevich 13' (yellow card) 45+4'; Khagush (yellow card) 53'; K.Kangwa (yellow card) 56'; Panteleyev 74'; Čaušić (yellow card) 86'; Lomovitsky (yellow card) 88'; Banda (yellow card) 90+1'; Tkachyov 90+4' (yellow card) 90+5'	Stadium: Central Stadium; Referee: Nikolay Voloshin
Note: Match originally scheduled for 6 May, but postponed on 1 April due to the COVID-19 pandemic.

22 July 2020 30	Ufa	0 – 0	Arsenal Tula	Ufa
19:00 MSK (UTC+3)	Thill (yellow card) 43'	Report	Belyayev (yellow card) 53'; Čaušić (yellow card) 79'; Gromyko (yellow card) 90'	Stadium: Neftyanik Stadium; Referee: Aleksey Matyunin
Note: Match originally scheduled for 17 May, but postponed on 1 April due to the COVID-19 pandemic.

==== League table ====
Pos	Team	Pld	W	D	L	GF	GA	GD	Pts	Qualification or relegation
6	Dynamo Moscow	30	11	8	11	27	30	−3	41	Qualification for the Europa League second qualifying round
7	Spartak Moscow	30	11	6	13	35	33	+2	39	
8	Arsenal Tula	30	11	5	14	37	41	−4	38 (Note: Head-to-head points: Arsenal Tula 4, Ufa 1)	
9	Ufa	30	8	14	8	22	24	−2	38	
10	Rubin Kazan	30	8	11	11	18	28	−10	35 (Note: Head-to-head points: Rubin Kazan 4, Ural 1)	

Source: Russian Premier Liga, Soccerway
Rules for classification: 1) Points; 2) Head-to-head points; 3) Head-to-head matches won; 4) Head-to-head goal difference; 5) Head-to-head goals scored; 6) Matches won; 7) Goal difference; 8) Goals scored; 9) Play-off.

=== Russian Cup ===
25 September 2019 Round of 32	Fakel Voronezh	1 – 2	Arsenal Tula	Voronezh
19:00 MSK (UTC+3)	Kosyanchuk (yellow card) 33' (yellow-red card) 85'; Masternoy 44'; Koryan (yellow card) 50'; Solovyov (yellow card) 90'	Report	Álvarez 26'; Lesovoy (yellow card) 49'; Belyayev 90'	Stadium: Tsentralnyi Profsoyuz Stadion; Attendance: 7,513; Referee: Aleksey Suhoy

30 October 2019 Round of 16	Ural Yekaterinburg	2 – 2 (a.e.t.) (5 – 4 p)	Arsenal Tula	Yekaterinburg
17:00 MSK (UTC+3)	Dimitrov 24'; El Kabir (yellow card) 30' (goal) 37' (pen.); Pogrebnyak (yellow card) 38'; Boumal (red card) 53'; Kulakov (yellow card) 120'	Report	Kostadinov 14'; Tkachyov 34'; Khagush (yellow card) 37'; Lomovitsky (yellow card) 65'; Bauer (yellow card) 97'; Lesovoy (yellow card) 109'	Stadium: Central Stadium; Referee: Anatoliy Zhabchenko
	Penalties
	Kulakov (penalty scored); Nasyrov (penalty missed); Augustyniak (penalty scored); Merkulov (penalty scored); Bavin (penalty scored); Haroyan (penalty scored)		(penalty scored) Bauer; (penalty scored) Álvarez; (penalty scored) Čaušić; (penalty missed) Tkachyov; (penalty scored) Lesovoy; (penalty missed) Kangwa

=== UEFA Europa League ===
==== Qualifying rounds ====
25 July 2019 Second qualifying round 1st leg	Arsenal Tula (Russia)	0 – 1	(Azerbaijan) Neftçi	Tula, Russia
20:00 MSK (UTC+3)	Kombarov (yellow card) 81'; Tkachyov (yellow card) 90+3'	Report	M.Kane (yellow card) 25'; Aliyev (yellow card) 37'; Dário 45+1'; Mahmudov (yellow card) 68'; Buludov (yellow card) 79'	Stadium: Arsenal Stadium; Attendance: 16,720; Referee: Enea Jorgji (Albania)

1 August 2019 Second qualifying round 2nd leg	Neftçi (Azerbaijan)	3 – 0 (4 – 0 agg.)	(Russia) Arsenal Tula	Baku, Azerbaijan
20:00 MSK (UTC+3)	Aliyev 49'; Petrov (yellow card) 67'; Krivotsyuk (yellow card) 87'; Dário 89' (pen.); Mbodj 90+3' (yellow card) 90+4'	Report	Čaušić (yellow card) 9'; Kostadinov (yellow card) 80'; Grigalava (yellow card) 88'	Stadium: Bakcell Arena; Attendance: 9,000; Referee: Alan Mario Sant (Malta)

== Squad statistics ==
As of match played 22 July 2020

=== Appearances and goals ===
No.	Pos	Nat	Player	Total		Premier League		Russian Cup		Europa League	
No.	Pos	Nat	Player	Apps	Goals	Apps	Goals	Apps	Goals	Apps	Goals
1	GK	(Russia) RUS	Artur Nigmatullin	2	0	1	0	1	0	0	0
3	DF	(Russia) RUS	Artyom Sokol	3	0	1+2	0	0	0	0	0
4	DF	(Germany) GER	Robert Bauer	16	1	12+2	1	1+1	0	0	0
5	DF	(Russia) RUS	Aleksandr Dovbnya	5	0	4+1	0	0	0	0	0
6	DF	(Russia) RUS	Maksim Belyayev	33	1	29	0	2	1	2	0
7	MF	(Russia) RUS	Kantemir Berkhamov	2	0	1	0	1	0	0	0
8	DF	(Georgia (country)) GEO	Gia Grigalava	25	1	22	1	1	0	2	0
9	DF	(Russia) RUS	Kirill Kombarov	21	0	16+3	0	0	0	2	0
10	FW	(Zambia) ZAM	Evans Kangwa	23	3	14+8	3	0+1	0	0	0
11	MF	(Russia) RUS	Sergei Tkachyov	31	3	22+5	2	1+1	1	2	0
13	DF	(Belarus) BLR	Maksim Valadzko	4	0	0+4	0	0	0	0	0
14	DF	(Russia) RUS	Anri Khagush	8	0	4+3	0	1	0	0	0
15	MF	(Belarus) BLR	Yury Kavalyow	5	0	1+4	0	0	0	0	0
17	FW	(Russia) RUS	Guram Adzhoyev	1	0	0+1	0	0	0	0	0
18	MF	(Belarus) BLR	Valeriy Gromyko	3	0	0+3	0	0	0	0	0
19	GK	(Russia) RUS	Yuri Lodygin	2	0	2	0	0	0	0	0
20	MF	(Serbia) SRB	Goran Čaušić	24	2	20+1	2	0+1	0	2	0
21	DF	(Spain) ESP	Víctor Álvarez	28	2	24	1	2	1	2	0
22	MF	(Russia) RUS	Daniil Lesovoy	31	3	22+5	3	2	0	2	0
23	MF	(Russia) RUS	Igor Gorbatenko	28	1	20+4	1	2	0	2	0
25	MF	(Zambia) ZAM	Kings Kangwa	9	0	4+4	0	1	0	0	0
27	MF	(Russia) RUS	Aleksandr Lomovitsky	26	2	14+10	2	2	0	0	0
28	MF	(Russia) RUS	Vladislav Panteleyev	6	2	3+3	2	0	0	0	0
29	MF	(Zambia) ZAM	Lameck Banda	11	0	1+8	0	0	0	1+1	0
36	GK	(Russia) RUS	Mikhail Levashov	20	0	18	0	0	0	2	0
48	FW	(Russia) RUS	Yevgeni Lutsenko	31	15	25+3	15	1	0	1+1	0
50	GK	(Russia) RUS	Yegor Shamov	10	0	9	0	1	0	0	0
70	MF	(Bulgaria) BUL	Georgi Kostadinov	27	1	23+1	0	1	1	1+1	0
71	DF	(Russia) RUS	Aleksandr Denisov	14	1	12+1	1	1	0	0	0
77	FW	(Russia) RUS	Roman Minayev	3	0	0+3	0	0	0	0	0
82	MF	(Russia) RUS	Daniil Khlusevich	5	1	4+1	1	0	0	0	0
Players away from the club on loan:
30	FW	(Romania) ROU	Alexandru Tudorie	11	1	2+5	1	1+1	0	1+1	0
Players who appeared for Arsenal Tula but left during the season:

=== Goal scorers ===
Place	Position	Nation	Number	Name	Premier League	Russian Cup	Europa League	Total
1	FW	(Russia)	48	Yevgeni Lutsenko	15	0	0	15
2	FW	(Zambia)	10	Evans Kangwa	3	0	0	3
2	MF	(Russia)	22	Daniil Lesovoy	3	0	0	3
2	MF	(Russia)	11	Sergei Tkachyov	2	1	0	3
5	MF	(Russia)	27	Aleksandr Lomovitsky	2	0	0	2
5	MF	(Serbia)	20	Goran Čaušić	2	0	0	2
5	DF	(Spain)	21	Víctor Álvarez	1	1	0	2
5	MF	(Russia)	28	Vladislav Panteleyev	1	0	0	1
8	DF	(Georgia (country))	8	Gia Grigalava	1	0	0	1
8	FW	(Romania)	30	Alexandru Tudorie	1	0	0	1
8	MF	(Russia)	7	Kantemir Berkhamov	1	0	0	1
8	DF	(Germany)	4	Robert Bauer	1	0	0	1
8	MF	(Russia)	23	Igor Gorbatenko	1	0	0	1
8	DF	(Russia)	71	Aleksandr Denisov	1	0	0	1
8	MF	(Russia)	82	Daniil Khlusevich	1	0	0	1
8	DF	(Russia)	6	Maksim Belyayev	0	1	0	1
8	MF	(Bulgaria)	70	Georgi Kostadinov	0	1	0	1
Total					36	4	0	40

=== Clean sheets ===
Place	Position	Nation	Number	Name	Premier League	Russian Cup	Europa League	Total
1	GK	(Russia)	36	Mikhail Levashov	4	0	0	4
2	GK	(Russia)	50	Yegor Shamov	3	0	0	3
Total					7	0	0	7

=== Disciplinary record ===
Number	Nation	Position	Name	Premier League		Russian Cup		Europa League		Total	
Number	Nation	Position	Name	Yellow card	Red card	Yellow card	Red card	Yellow card	Red card	Yellow card	Red card
4	(Germany)	DF	Robert Bauer	4	1	1	0	0	0	5	1
6	(Russia)	DF	Maksim Belyayev	2	0	0	0	0	0	2	0
8	(Georgia (country))	DF	Gia Grigalava	7	0	0	0	1	0	8	0
9	(Russia)	DF	Kirill Kombarov	5	1	0	0	1	0	6	1
10	(Zambia)	FW	Evans Kangwa	2	0	0	0	0	0	2	0
11	(Russia)	MF	Sergei Tkachyov	5	0	0	0	1	0	6	0
14	(Russia)	DF	Anri Khagush	2	0	1	0	0	0	3	0
15	(Belarus)	MF	Yury Kavalyow	2	0	0	0	0	0	2	0
18	(Belarus)	MF	Valeriy Gromyko	1	0	0	0	0	0	1	0
20	(Serbia)	MF	Goran Čaušić	6	0	0	0	1	0	7	0
21	(Spain)	DF	Víctor Álvarez	7	0	0	0	0	0	7	0
22	(Russia)	MF	Daniil Lesovoy	4	0	2	0	0	0	6	0
23	(Russia)	MF	Igor Gorbatenko	3	0	0	0	0	0	3	0
25	(Zambia)	MF	Kings Kangwa	2	0	0	0	0	0	2	0
27	(Russia)	MF	Aleksandr Lomovitsky	8	0	1	0	0	0	9	0
28	(Russia)	MF	Vladislav Panteleyev	1	0	0	0	0	0	1	0
29	(Zambia)	MF	Lameck Banda	2	0	0	0	0	0	2	0
36	(Russia)	GK	Mikhail Levashov	2	0	0	0	0	0	2	0
48	(Russia)	FW	Yevgeni Lutsenko	4	0	0	0	0	0	4	0
50	(Russia)	GK	Yegor Shamov	2	0	0	0	0	0	2	0
70	(Bulgaria)	MF	Georgi Kostadinov	8	0	0	0	1	0	9	0
71	(Russia)	DF	Aleksandr Denisov	5	0	0	0	0	0	5	0
77	(Russia)	FW	Roman Minayev	1	0	0	0	0	0	1	0
82	(Russia)	MF	Daniil Khlusevich	2	0	0	0	0	0	2	0
Players away on loan:
Players who left Arsenal Tula during the season:
Total				86	2	5	0	5	0	96	2
