= 2020–21 FC Arsenal Tula season =

FC Arsenal Tula
2020–21 season
- Chairman: Guram Adzhoyev
- Manager: Sergei Podpaly (until 2 November); Dmytro Parfenov (from 2 November)
- Stadium: Arsenal Stadium
- Premier League: 14th
- Russian Cup: Quarterfinal vs CSKA Moscow
- Top goalscorer: League: Evans Kangwa (4); All: Evans Kangwa (4)
- Highest home attendance: 9,890 vs CSKA Moscow (13 March 2021)
- Lowest home attendance: 1,743 vs Rotor Volgograd (7 November 2020)
- Average home league attendance: 5,355 (8 May 2021)
Home colours	Away colours

The 2020–21 FC Arsenal Tula season was the 5th successive season that the club played in the Russian Premier League, the highest tier of association football in Russia. Arsenal Tula finished the season in 14th place and where knocked out of the Russian Cup in the Quarterfinals by CSKA Moscow.

== Season events ==
On 11 October, Arsenal Tula signed Kirill Panchenko from Tambov.

On 15 October, Luka Đorđević returned to Arsenal Tula on loan from Lokomotiv Moscow, having previously played for Arsenal on loan from Zenit St.Petersburg during the 2017–18 and 2018–19 seasons.

On 2 November, Sergei Podpaly was fired as manager, with Dmytro Parfenov being appointed as his replacement.

On 12 January, Arsenal Tula announced the signing of Igor Konovalov on loan from Rubin Kazan for the remainder of the season.

== Squad ==
As of 25 February 2021

Note: Flags indicate national team as defined under FIFA eligibility rules; some limited exceptions apply. Players may hold more than one non-FIFA nationality.

No.	Pos.	Nation	Player
1	GK	RUS	Artur Nigmatullin
3	DF	RUS	Artyom Sokol
4	DF	GER	Robert Bauer
5	DF	RUS	Taras Burlak
6	DF	RUS	Maksim Belyayev
7	MF	RUS	Aleksandr Lomovitsky (on loan from Spartak Moscow)
8	DF	GEO	Gia Grigalava
9	DF	RUS	Kirill Kombarov
10	FW	ZAM	Evans Kangwa
11	MF	RUS	Sergei Tkachyov
13	FW	RUS	Kirill Panchenko
14	DF	RUS	Anri Khagush
15	MF	BLR	Yury Kavalyow
17	FW	RUS	Guram Adzhoyev
18	MF	BLR	Valeriy Gromyko

No.	Pos.	Nation	Player
19	FW	MNE	Luka Đorđević (on loan from Lokomotiv Moscow)
20	MF	SRB	Goran Čaušić
21	MF	RUS	Igor Konovalov (on loan from Rubin Kazan)
23	MF	RUS	Igor Gorbatenko
28	MF	RUS	Vladislav Panteleyev
36	GK	RUS	Mikhail Levashov
44	MF	ZAM	Kings Kangwa
48	FW	RUS	Yevgeni Lutsenko
50	GK	RUS	Yegor Shamov
55	DF	RUS	Nikolai Zlobin
70	MF	BUL	Georgi Kostadinov
82	MF	RUS	Daniil Khlusevich
90	DF	RUS	Aleksandr Dovbnya
92	DF	RUS	Nikolai Rasskazov (on loan from Spartak Moscow)
96	FW	RUS	Aleksandr Konev

=== Out on loan ===
Note: Flags indicate national team as defined under FIFA eligibility rules; some limited exceptions apply. Players may hold more than one non-FIFA nationality.

No.	Pos.	Nation	Player
19	MF	ZAM	Lameck Banda (at Maccabi Netanya)
71	DF	RUS	Aleksandr Denisov (at Tambov)

No.	Pos.	Nation	Player
77	FW	RUS	Roman Minayev (at Tambov)
—	FW	ROU	Alexandru Tudorie (at CS Universitatea Craiova)

== Transfers ==
=== In ===
Date	Position	Nationality	Name	From	Fee	Ref.
6 August 2020	DF	(Russia)	Ilya Yermolayev		Free	
6 August 2020	FW	(Russia)	Pyotr Ivanov	Sakhalin Yuzhno-Sakhalinsk	Undisclosed	
7 August 2020	MF	(Russia)	Yegor Kudinov	Lada-Tolyatti	Undisclosed	
7 August 2020	FW	(Russia)	Maksim Rozhin	Kolomna	Undisclosed	
15 August 2020	DF	(Russia)	Taras Burlak	Krylia Sovetov	Undisclosed	
11 October 2020	FW	(Russia)	Kirill Panchenko	Tambov	Undisclosed	
17 October 2020	FW	(Russia)	Aleksandr Konev	Chertanovo Moscow	Undisclosed	

=== Loans in ===
Date from	Position	Nationality	Name	From	Date to	Ref.
16 September 2020	MF	(Ghana)	Mohammed Kadiri	Dynamo Kyiv	5 January 2021	
1 October 2020	DF	(Russia)	Nikolai Rasskazov	Spartak Moscow	End of Season	
1 October 2020	MF	(Russia)	Aleksandr Lomovitsky	Spartak Moscow	End of Season	
15 October 2020	FW	(Montenegro)	Luka Đorđević	Lokomotiv Moscow	End of season	
12 January 2021	MF	(Russia)	Igor Konovalov	Rubin Kazan	End of season	

=== Out ===
Date	Position	Nationality	Name	To	Fee	Ref.
7 September 2020	MF	(Russia)	Daniil Lesovoy	Dynamo Moscow	Undisclosed	

=== Loans out ===
Date from	Position	Nationality	Name	To	Date to	Ref.
12 August 2020	FW	(Romania)	Alexandru Tudorie	CS Universitatea Craiova	End of season	
7 September 2020	MF	(Zambia)	Lameck Banda	Maccabi Netanya	End of season	
20 February 2021	DF	(Russia)	Aleksandr Denisov	Tambov	End of season	
20 February 2021	FW	(Russia)	Roman Minayev	Tambov	End of season	

=== Released ===
Date	Position	Nationality	Name	Joined	Date	Ref.
31 December 2020	DF	(Russia)	Yaroslav Garastyuk			
31 December 2020	MF	(Russia)	Yegor Makarov			
31 December 2020	FW	(Russia)	Dmitri Bykov			
31 December 2020	FW	(Russia)	Danil Polyakh			
23 June 2021	DF	(Russia)	Kirill Kombarov	Retired	5 July 2021	
30 June 2021	GK	(Russia)	Grigori Kevayev	Neftekhimik Nizhnekamsk		
30 June 2021	GK	(Russia)	Igor Telkov	Retired		
30 June 2021	GK	(Russia)	Pavel Boriskin			
30 June 2021	DF	(Georgia (country))	Gia Grigalava	Khimki		
30 June 2021	DF	(Russia)	Anri Khagush			
30 June 2021	DF	(Russia)	Kirill Lomakin	Khimik Dzerzhinsk		
30 June 2021	DF	(Russia)	Ilya Yermolayev			
30 June 2021	MF	(Russia)	Vladimir Banykin			
30 June 2021	MF	(Belarus)	Yury Kavalyow	Orenburg		
30 June 2021	MF	(Russia)	Ruslan Kul	Sokol Saratov		
30 June 2021	MF	(Russia)	Timur Lobanov	Saturn Ramenskoye		
30 June 2021	MF	(Russia)	Artyom Mingazov	Avangard Kursk		
30 June 2021	MF	(Russia)	Danila Polyakov	Kolomna		
30 June 2021	MF	(Russia)	Kirill Shekhov	Khimki-M		
30 June 2021	MF	(Russia)	Giorgi Uridia	Volga Ulyanovsk		
30 June 2021	FW	(Russia)	Aleksandr Konev			
30 June 2021	FW	(Russia)	Roman Minayev	Rotor Volgograd	1 July 2021	
30 June 2021	FW	(Russia)	Maksim Rozhin			
30 June 2021	FW	(Russia)	David Rudakov			

== Friendlies ==
8 September 2020	CSKA Moscow	1 – 0	Arsenal Tula	Moscow
16:00 MSK (UTC+3)	Tiknizyan (yellow card) 39'; T.Avanesyan (yellow card) 51'; Gaich 90'	Report	Čaušić (yellow card) 19'; R.Izotov (yellow card) 88'	Stadium: VEB Arena

17 January 2021	Arsenal Tula (Russia)	0 – 0	(Serbia) TSC Bačka Topola	Belek, Turkey
MSK (UTC+3)		Report	D.Ponjević (yellow card) 72'	Stadium: Kempinski Hotel; Attendance: 0 Referee: Bahadir Bulut

23 January 2021	Arsenal Tula (Russia)	1 – 0	(Serbia) Novi Pazar	Belek, Turkey
MSK (UTC+3)	Panchenko (yellow card) 21'; Panteleyev 57'	Report		Stadium: Kempinski Hotel; Attendance: 0 Referee: Bahadir Bulut

30 January 2020	Arsenal Tula (Russia)	4 – 1	(North Macedonia) Sileks	Belek, Turkey
17:00 MSK (UTC+3)	E.Kangwa 14'; Burlak 30'; Gromyko 60'; Lomovitsky 73'	Report	D.Karcheski (yellow card) 37' (goal) 59'	Referee: Genjay Khurman (Turkey)

31 January 2020	Arsenal Tula (Russia)	4 – 1	(Latvia) Liepāja	Belek, Turkey
17:00 MSK (UTC+3)	Panteleyev 12', 24'; Lutsenko 17'; Panchenko 88'	Report	Ikaunieks 85'

3 February 2020	Arsenal Tula (Russia)	4 – 0	(Bulgaria) Montana	Belek, Turkey
17:00 MSK (UTC+3)	7' (o.g.); Tkachyov (yellow card) 23'; Panchenko 27'; Grigalava 37'	Report

6 February 2020	Arsenal Tula (Russia)	3 – 3	(Bosnia and Herzegovina) Velež Mostar	Belek, Turkey
17:00 MSK (UTC+3)	Panchenko 13'; E.Vehabović 61'; H.Ovčina 90'	Report	Brandao 9'; E.Kangwa 41'; Burlak 81'

== Competitions ==
=== Overview ===
Competition	First match	Last match	Starting round	Record							
Competition	First match	Last match	Starting round	Pld	W	D	L	GF	GA	GD	Win %
Premier League	9 August 2020	May 2021	Matchday 1	30	6	5	19	28	51	−23	20.00
Russian Cup	2020		Round of 32	3	1	2	0	3	2	+1	33.33
Total				33	7	7	19	31	53	−22	21.21

Last updated: 16 May 2021
Source: Competitions

=== Premier League ===
==== Results summary ====
Overall								Home						Away					
Pld	W	D	L	GF	GA	GD	Pts	W	D	L	GF	GA	GD	W	D	L	GF	GA	GD
30	6	5	19	28	51	−23	23	6	4	5	22	20	+2	0	1	14	6	31	−25

Last updated: 16 May 2021.
Source: See Results

==== Results by round ====
Round	1	2	3	4	5	6	7	8	9	10	11	12	13	14	15	16	17	18	19	20	21	22	23	24	25	26	27	28	29	30
Ground	H	H	A	H	H	A	A	H	H	A	H	A	A	H	A	H	A	A	A	A	H	H	A	A	H	H	A	H	H	A
Result	D	L	L	W	D	L	L	W	L	D	W	L	L	D	L	D	L	L	L	L	L	W	L	L	W	W	L	L	L	L
Position	9	10	14	13	11	13	14	12	12	12	11	12	13	12	13	13	13	13	14	14	15	14	14	14	13	13	13	13	13	14

Updated to match(es) played on 16 May 2021. Source: Premier Liga
A = Away; H = Home; W = Win; D = Draw; L = Loss

==== Results ====
9 August 2020 1	Arsenal Tula	0 – 0	Akhmat Grozny	Tula
19:00 MSK (UTC+3)	Dovbnya (yellow card) 14'; Khlusevich (yellow card) 90'; Gromyko (yellow card) 90+5'	Report	Nenakhov (yellow card) 14'; Nižić (yellow card) 49'	Stadium: Arsenal Stadium; Attendance: 1,892; Referee: Kirill Levnikov

14 August 2020 2	Arsenal Tula	2 – 3	Ufa	Tula
18:00 MSK (UTC+3)	Grigalava (yellow card) 23'; Lutsenko 26'; Khlusevich (yellow card) 52'; K.Kangwa (yellow card) 59' (yellow-red card) 85' (goal) 72'; Bauer (yellow card) 62'; E.Kangwa (yellow card) 78' (yellow-red card) 90+'; Belyayev (yellow card) 90+'	Report	Golubev (yellow card) 25' (goal) 54'; Krotov 45+'; Bizjak 63' (pen.); Jokić (yellow card) 64'	Stadium: Arsenal Stadium; Attendance: 1,896; Referee: Sergey Lapochkin

18 August 2020 3	Krasnodar	2 – 0	Arsenal Tula	Krasnodar
20:00 MSK (UTC+3)	Utkin (yellow card) 27'; Petrov 35' (yellow card) 62'; Berg (yellow card) 64' (goal) 66'; Olsson (yellow card) 74'	Report	Denisov (yellow card) 16'; Bauer (yellow card) 37'; Čaušić (yellow card) 54'	Stadium: Krasnodar Stadium; Attendance: 3,518; Referee: Sergey Ivanov

22 August 2020 4	Arsenal Tula	2 – 0	Dynamo Moscow	Tula
17:30 MSK (UTC+3)	Lesovoy 23', 74' (pen.); Čaušić (yellow card) 38'; Bauer (yellow card) 58'; Gromyko (yellow card) 62'; E.Kangwa (yellow card) 65'	Report	Fomin (yellow card) 35'; Yevgenyev (yellow card) 80'; Grulyov (yellow card) 83'	Stadium: Arsenal Stadium; Attendance: 1,897; Referee: Vladimir Moskalyov

25 August 2020 5	Arsenal Tula	1 – 1	Khimki	Tula
20:30 MSK (UTC+3)	Sokol (yellow card) 59'; E.Kangwa 76'	Report	Aliyev (yellow card) 8' (goal) 30'; Kukharchuk (yellow card) 11'; Troshechkin (yellow card) 15'; Kazantsev (yellow card) 68' (yellow-red card) 77'	Stadium: Arsenal Stadium; Attendance: 3,244; Referee: Nikolay Voloshin

29 August 2020 6	Spartak Moscow	2 – 1	Arsenal Tula	Moscow
18:00 MSK (UTC+3)	Sobolev 41'; Gigot 45+' (yellow card) 71'	Report	Lesovoy (yellow card) 13' (yellow-red card) 45'; Sokol (yellow card) 30'; Khlusevich 36'; Panteleyev (yellow card) 42'; Čaušić (yellow card) 90'	Stadium: Otkritie Arena; Attendance: 9,186; Referee: Aleksei Matyunin

14 September 2020 7	Zenit St.Petersburg	3 – 1	Arsenal Tula	Saint Petersburg
18:30 MSK (UTC+3)	Mostovoy 25'; Dzyuba 31'; Barrios (yellow card) 37'; Yerokhin 87'	Report	Burlak (yellow card) 21'; Khlusevich (yellow card) 45+'; Kavalyow 60'; Tkachyov (yellow card) 79'	Stadium: Krestovsky Stadium; Attendance: 21,559; Referee: Pavel Kukuyan

20 September 2020 8	Arsenal Tula	3 – 2	Sochi	Tula
14:00 MSK (UTC+3)	Sokol (yellow card) 6'; Lutsenko (yellow card) 9'; E.Kangwa (yellow card) 16' (goal) 45'; Tkachyov 21', 71'	Report	Noboa 10' (pen.); Margasov (yellow card) 29'; Zaika (yellow card) 54'; Mevlja 65'; Tsallagov 69'	Stadium: Arsenal Stadium; Attendance: 5,028; Referee: Evgeny Kukulyak

27 September 2020 9	Arsenal Tula	2 – 3	Rostov	Tula
14:00 MSK (UTC+3)	E.Kangwa 9'; Kavalyow (yellow card) 35'; K.Kangwa (yellow card) 38'; Bauer (yellow card) 47'; Kombarov (yellow card) 60'; Kadiri 90+'	Report	Chernov 13' (yellow card) 25'; Ionov (yellow card) 17'; Hashimoto 40', 45' (yellow card) 53'; Bayramyan (yellow card) 47'; Normann (yellow card) 52'; Glebov (yellow card) 54' (yellow-red card) 67'	Stadium: Arsenal Stadium; Attendance: 5,945; Referee: Vitali Meshkov

3 October 2020 10	Tambov	1 – 1	Arsenal Tula	Saransk
16:30 MSK (UTC+3)	Ciupercă 87' (pen.)	Report	K.Kangwa (yellow card) 5'; Kostadinov (yellow card) 27'; Kadiri 43'; Belyayev (yellow card) 77'; Gorbatenko (yellow card) 86'; Zlobin (yellow card) 88'	Stadium: Mordovia Arena; Attendance: 1,983; Referee: Vladislav Bezborodov
Note: Match played at the Mordovia Arena in Saransk instead of Tambov's regular Spartak Stadium.

18 October 2020 11	Arsenal Tula	1 – 0	Ural Yekaterinburg	Tula
14:00 MSK (UTC+3)	Lomovitsky (yellow card) 28' (goal) 36'; Panchenko (yellow card) 39'; Bauer (yellow card) 81'	Report	Strandberg (yellow card) 14'; Miškić (yellow card) 56'; Kalinin (yellow card) 67'; Yemelyanov (yellow card) 90'	Stadium: Arsenal Stadium; Attendance: 4,230; Referee: Sergey Lapochkin

26 October 2020 12	CSKA Moscow	5 – 1	Arsenal Tula	Moscow
19:00 MSK (UTC+3)	Kuchayev (yellow card) 43'; Chalov 45+' (pen.); Vlašić 50', 58'; Sigurðsson 86'; Oblyakov 87'	Report	Grigalava (yellow card) 28'; Đorđević (yellow card) 31' (goal) 78'; Bauer (yellow card) 90'	Stadium: VEB Arena; Attendance: 5,092; Referee: Igor Panin

31 October 2020 13	Rubin Kazan	3 – 1	Arsenal Tula	Kazan
14:00 MSK (UTC+3)	Starfelt 20'; Despotović 22'; Bakayev 53'; Samoshnikov (yellow card) 63'; Kosarev (yellow card) 90+'	Report	E.Kangwa (yellow card) 55'; Panchenko 83'; Belyayev (yellow card) 85'	Stadium: Ak Bars Arena; Attendance: 3,899; Referee: Vasily Kazartsev

7 November 2020 14	Arsenal Tula	1 – 1	Rotor Volgograd	Tula
16:30 MSK (UTC+3)	Panchenko 5'; Rasskazov (yellow card) 36'; Dovbnya (yellow card) 59'	Report	Bairyyev (yellow card) 12' (yellow-red card) 37'; Makarov (yellow card) 26'; Stepanov 62'; Davitashvili (yellow card) 67'	Stadium: Arsenal Stadium; Attendance: 1,743; Referee: Stanislav Vasiliev

21 November 2020 15	Lokomotiv Moscow	1 – 0	Arsenal Tula	Moscow
19:00 MSK (UTC+3)	Krychowiak (yellow card) 8'; Ćorluka (yellow card) 21' (yellow-red card) 45+'; Miranchuk 72' (pen.)	Report	Panchenko (yellow card) 37'; Čaušić (yellow card) 52'; Kostadinov (yellow card) 75'	Stadium: RZD Arena; Attendance: 3,976; Referee: Alexey Sukhoi

28 November 2020 16	Arsenal Tula	0 – 0	Zenit St.Petersburg	Tula
14:00 MSK (UTC+3)	Lomovitsky (yellow card) 37'; K.Kangwa (yellow card) 39'; Kostadinov (yellow card) 72'; Panchenko (yellow card) 90+'	Report	Barrios (yellow card) 90+'	Stadium: Arsenal Stadium; Attendance: 1,916; Referee: Evgeny Kukulyak

6 December 2020 17	Dynamo Moscow	1 – 0	Arsenal Tula	Moscow
16:30 MSK (UTC+3)	Fomin 45'; Ordets (yellow card) 72'; Tyukavin (yellow card) 83'	Report	Dovbnya (yellow card) 78'	Stadium: VTB Arena; Attendance: 4,768; Referee: Vasily Kazartsev

11 December 2020 18	Khimki	1 – 0	Arsenal Tula	Khimki
19:00 MSK (UTC+3)	Kukharchuk 12'; Glushakov (yellow card) 46'; Tikhiy (yellow card) 63'; Idowu (yellow card) 90+2'	Report	Sokol (yellow card) 18'; Gromyko (yellow card) 90'	Stadium: Arena Khimki; Referee: Ivan Sidenkov

16 December 2020 19	Rotor Volgograd	1 – 0	Arsenal Tula	Volgograd
18:00 MSK (UTC+3)	Stepanov (yellow card) 15'; Kozhemyakin (yellow card) 37'; Flamarion 81' (pen.)	Report	Tkachyov (yellow card) 16'; Rasskazov (yellow card) 58'; Kostadinov (yellow card) 73'; Kadiri (yellow card) 82'; Gorbatenko (yellow card) 87'; Khagush (yellow card) 90'	Stadium: Volgograd Arena; Attendance: 2,118; Referee: Igor Panin

27 February 2020 20	Sochi	4 – 0	Arsenal Tula	Sochi
19:00 MSK (UTC+3)	Zabolotny 51'; Terekhov 53'; Joãozinho 58'; Yusupov 67'; Zaika (yellow card) 81'	Report	Dovbnya (yellow card) 41'; Grigalava (yellow card) 68'; Tkachyov (yellow card) 86'	Stadium: Fisht Olympic Stadium; Attendance: 3,311; Referee: Mikhail Vilkov

8 March 2021 21	Arsenal Tula	0 – 3	Lokomotiv Moscow	Tula
14:00 MSK (UTC+3)	Tkachyov (yellow card) 49'; Bauer (yellow card) 63'; Đorđević (yellow card) 84'	Report	Rybchinsky (yellow card) 8'; Mukhin (yellow card) 40'; Kulikov (yellow card) 52'; Smolov 71'; Murilo 75'; Rybus (yellow card) 78'; Zhemaletdinov 85'	Stadium: Arsenal Stadium; Attendance: 7,951; Referee: Kirill Levnikov

13 March 2021 22	Arsenal Tula	2 – 1	CSKA Moscow	Tula
14:00 MSK (UTC+3)	Zaynutdinov (yellow card) 40'; Diveyev (yellow card) 80'; Tiknizyan 90' (yellow card) 90+'	Report	Panteleyev 42' (pen.); Lomovitsky 45'; Bauer (yellow card) 63'; Dovbnya (yellow card) 83' (yellow-red card) 90+'; Gromyko (yellow card) 89' (yellow-red card) 90+'	Stadium: Arsenal Stadium; Attendance: 9,890; Referee: Vladislav Bezborodov

17 March 2021 23	Akhmat Grozny	2 – 0	Arsenal Tula	Grozny
20:00 MSK (UTC+3)	Ismael (yellow card) 21'; Shvets (yellow card) 28'; Semyonov 34'; Ilyin (yellow card) 41' (goal) 47'	Report	Čaušić (yellow card) 27'; Sokol (yellow card) 32'; Panteleyev (yellow card) 35'; E.Kangwa (yellow card) 90+'	Stadium: Akhmat-Arena; Attendance: 2,589; Referee: Sergey Lapochkin

4 April 2021 24	Ural Yekaterinburg	2 – 0	Arsenal Tula	Yekaterinburg
14:00 MSK (UTC+3)	Kalinin (yellow card) 2'; Pogrebnyak 13' (yellow card) 55'; Gadzhimuradov 85' (yellow card) 90+'	Report	Panteleyev (penalty missed) 3' (yellow card) 40'; Lutsenko (yellow card) 17'; Khagush (yellow card) 34'; Konovalov (yellow card) 82'; Lomovitsky (yellow card) 90+'	Stadium: Central Stadium; Attendance: 7,526; Referee: Sergey Ivanov

11 April 2021 25	Arsenal Tula	1 – 0	Krasnodar	Tula
14:00 MSK (UTC+3)	Belyayev (yellow card) 58'; Čaušić 62'	Report	Berg (yellow card) 8'; Cabella (yellow card) 53'; Vilhena (yellow card) 66'; Wanderson (yellow card) 73'	Stadium: Arsenal Stadium; Attendance: 8,974; Referee: Ivan Sidenkov

18 April 2021 26	Arsenal Tula	4 – 0	Tambov	Tula
14:00 MSK (UTC+3)	Bauer 11' (pen.); Lutsenko 25'; E.Kangwa (yellow card) 54'; Tkachyov 65'; Khlusevich 66' Lomovitsky (yellow card) 78'	Report	Bavin (yellow card) 27'; Martynov (yellow card) 35'	Stadium: Arsenal Stadium; Attendance: 6,420; Referee: Evgeny Kukulyak

25 April 2021 27	Rostov	1 – 0	Arsenal Tula	Rostov-on-Don
16:30 MSK (UTC+3)	Poloz (yellow card) 41' (goal) 74' (pen.); Obukhov (yellow card) 89'	Report	Grigalava (yellow card) 39'; Burlak (red card) 50'; Khlusevich (yellow card) 66'; Panchenko (yellow card) 83'; Bauer (penalty missed) 89'	Stadium: Rostov Arena; Attendance: 15,021; Referee: Vladislav Bezborodov

3 May 2021 28	Arsenal Tula	1 – 2	Spartak Moscow	Tula
16:30 MSK (UTC+3)	Đorđević (yellow card) 38'; Čaušić (yellow card) 40'; Kutepov 45' (o.g.); Kavalyow (yellow card) 60'; Tkachyov (yellow card) 90'	Report	Sobolev 21' (yellow card) 29'; Larsson 76'	Stadium: Arsenal Stadium; Attendance: 9,432; Referee: Sergey Ivanov

8 May 2021 29	Arsenal Tula	2 – 4	Rubin Kazan	Tula
16:30 MSK (UTC+3)	Khlusevich 25' (yellow card) 82'; Tkachyov (yellow card) 28' (yellow-red card) 52'; Đorđević 32' (yellow card) 62'; Grigalava (yellow card) 90+'	Report	Despotović 52' (pen.); Bakayev (yellow card) 54'; Makarov 59'; Zuyev (yellow card) 63'; Starfelt 66'; Zotov (yellow card) 79'; Kostyukov 89'	Stadium: Arsenal Stadium; Attendance: 6,103; Referee: Kirill Levnikov

16 May 2021 30	Ufa	2 – 1	Arsenal Tula	Ufa
14:00 MSK (UTC+3)	Ivanov 7'; Belyayev 43' (o.g.); Sysuyev (yellow card) 80'	Report	E.Kangwa 33'; Grigalava (red card) 53'	Stadium: Neftyanik Stadium; Attendance: 8,345; Referee: Sergei Karasev

==== League table ====
Pos	Team	Pld	W	D	L	GF	GA	GD	Pts	Qualification or relegation
12	Ural Yekaterinburg	30	7	13	10	26	36	−10	34	
13	Ufa	30	6	7	17	26	46	−20	25	
14	Arsenal Tula	30	6	5	19	28	51	−23	23	
15	Rotor Volgograd (R)	30	5	7	18	15	52	−37	22	Relegation to Football National League
16	Tambov (D)	30	3	4	23	19	65	−46	13	Dissolved after the season (Note: On 19 May 2021, FC Tambov announced that most of the staff and players were released from their contracts and the club began the process of liquidation.)

Source: Premier Liga
Rules for classification: 1) Points; 2) Head-to-head points; 3) Head-to-head matches won; 4) Head-to-head goal difference; 5) Head-to-head goals scored; 6) Matches won; 7) Goal difference; 8) Goals scored; 9) Play-off.
(D) Disqualified; (R) Relegated

=== Russian Cup ===
==== Round of 32 ====
Pos	Team	Pld	W	PW	PL	L	GF	GA	GD	Pts	Final result
1	Arsenal Tula (Q)	2	0	2	0	0	1	1	0	4	Advance to Play-off
2	Tekstilshchik Ivanovo	2	1	0	1	0	3	0	+3	4	
3	Salyut Belgorod	2	0	0	1	1	1	4	−3	1	

Rules for classification: 1) Points; 2) Wins; 3) Goal differential; 4) Goals scored; 5) Head-to-head result; 6) Disciplinary points.
(Q) Qualified to the phase indicated

23 September 2020 1	Salyut Belgorod	1 – 1 (a.e.t.) (3–4 p)	Arsenal Tula	Belgorod
17:00 MSK (UTC+3)	Burykin 64'; A.Ivanteev (yellow card) 81'; D.Matvevnin (yellow card) 90+3'	Report	Panteleyev 62'	Stadium: Energomash Stadium; Referee: Ivan Abrosimov
	Penalties
	Burykin (penalty scored); Semeykin (penalty scored); Yesin (penalty missed); Dyogtev (penalty scored); Ivanteev (penalty missed); Masterov (penalty missed)		Kombarov (penalty scored); Čaušić (penalty scored); Gorbatenko (penalty missed); Grigalava (penalty missed); Panteleyev (penalty scored); Kavalyow (penalty scored)

21 October 2020 2	Tekstilshchik Ivanovo	0 – 0 (a.e.t.) (3–4 p)	Arsenal Tula	Ivanovo
15:00 MSK (UTC+3)	Morozov (yellow card) 47'; Fomin (yellow card) 54'	Report	K.Kangwa (yellow card) 14'; Sokol (red card) 84'	Stadium: Tekstilshchik Stadium; Referee: Sergey Kulikov
	Penalties
	Fomin (penalty missed); Romanenko (penalty scored); Mnatsakanyan (penalty scored); Appayev (penalty scored); Sidorov (penalty missed)		Burlak (penalty scored); Bauer (penalty scored); Panchenko (penalty scored); Lomovitsky (penalty scored)

==== Round of 16 ====
20 February 2021 Round of 16	Zenit St.Petersburg	1 – 2	Arsenal Tula	Saint Petersburg
17:00 MSK (UTC+3)	Kuzyayev 19'; Rakitskiy (yellow card) 24'; Krapukhin (yellow card) 86'; Ozdoyev (yellow card) 89'	Report	Panchenko 25' (yellow card) 71'; Bauer (yellow card) 27' (goal) 37' (pen.); E.Kangwa (yellow card) 76'; Grigalava (yellow card) 89'	Stadium: Krestovsky Stadium; Attendance: 18,463; Referee: Stanislav Vasilyev

8 April 2021 Quarterfinal	Arsenal Tula	1 – 2	CSKA Moscow	Tula
19:30 MSK (UTC+3)	Lutsenko (yellow card) 21' (yellow-red card) 55' (goal) 33'; Panchenko (yellow card) 47'; Lomovitsky (yellow card) 71'	Report	Shchennikov (yellow card) 23'; Karpov 48'; Fernandes 86'; Tiknizyan (yellow card) 90'	Stadium: Arsenal Stadium; Attendance: 9,123; Referee: Mikhail Vilkov

== Squad statistics ==
As of match played 16 May 2021

=== Appearances and goals ===
No.	Pos	Nat	Player	Total		Premier League		Russian Cup	
No.	Pos	Nat	Player	Apps	Goals	Apps	Goals	Apps	Goals
1	GK	(Russia) RUS	Artur Nigmatullin	10	0	9	0	1	0
3	DF	(Russia) RUS	Artyom Sokol	17	0	10+5	0	1+1	0
4	DF	(Germany) GER	Robert Bauer	25	2	22	1	3	1
5	DF	(Russia) RUS	Taras Burlak	18	0	13+2	0	1+2	0
6	DF	(Russia) RUS	Maksim Belyayev	16	0	15+1	0	0	0
7	MF	(Russia) RUS	Aleksandr Lomovitsky	21	2	17+1	2	2+1	0
8	DF	(Georgia (country)) GEO	Gia Grigalava	21	0	18	0	3	0
9	DF	(Russia) RUS	Kirill Kombarov	5	0	3+1	0	1	0
10	MF	(Zambia) ZAM	Evans Kangwa	28	4	19+6	4	1+2	0
11	MF	(Russia) RUS	Sergei Tkachyov	23	3	11+10	3	1+1	0
13	FW	(Russia) RUS	Kirill Panchenko	19	3	10+6	2	3	1
14	DF	(Russia) RUS	Anri Khagush	5	0	1+3	0	1	0
15	MF	(Belarus) BLR	Yury Kavalyow	13	1	8+3	1	1+1	0
17	FW	(Russia) RUS	Guram Adzhoyev	7	0	0+5	0	1+1	0
18	MF	(Belarus) BLR	Valeriy Gromyko	16	0	4+12	0	0	0
19	FW	(Montenegro) MNE	Luka Đorđević	14	2	10+4	2	0	0
20	MF	(Serbia) SRB	Goran Čaušić	24	1	21+1	1	2	0
21	MF	(Russia) RUS	Igor Konovalov	10	0	3+6	0	1	0
23	MF	(Russia) RUS	Igor Gorbatenko	16	0	4+10	0	1+1	0
28	MF	(Russia) RUS	Vladislav Panteleyev	21	2	11+8	1	1+1	1
36	GK	(Russia) RUS	Mikhail Levashov	3	0	3	0	0	0
44	MF	(Zambia) ZAM	Kings Kangwa	24	1	14+7	1	1+2	0
48	FW	(Russia) RUS	Yevgeni Lutsenko	21	2	14+5	2	2	0
50	GK	(Russia) RUS	Yegor Shamov	22	0	18+1	0	3	0
55	DF	(Russia) RUS	Nikolai Zlobin	1	0	0+1	0	0	0
70	MF	(Bulgaria) BUL	Georgi Kostadinov	22	0	17+3	0	2	0
82	MF	(Russia) RUS	Daniil Khlusevich	28	3	13+12	3	3	0
90	DF	(Russia) RUS	Aleksandr Dovbnya	17	0	11+2	0	4	0
92	DF	(Russia) RUS	Nikolai Rasskazov	17	0	15+1	0	1	0
Players away from the club on loan:
19	MF	(Zambia) ZAM	Lameck Banda	2	0	0+2	0	0	0
71	DF	(Russia) RUS	Aleksandr Denisov	2	0	1+1	0	0	0
77	FW	(Russia) RUS	Roman Minayev	6	0	0+4	0	1+1	0
Players who appeared for Arsenal Tula but left during the season:
7	MF	(Russia) RUS	Daniil Lesovoy	6	2	6	2	0	0
21	MF	(Ghana) GHA	Mohammed Kadiri	13	2	9+2	2	2	0

=== Goal scorers ===
Place	Position	Nation	Number	Name	Premier League	Russian Cup	Total
1	MF	(Zambia)	10	Evans Kangwa	4	0	4
2	MF	(Russia)	11	Sergei Tkachyov	3	0	3
2	MF	(Russia)	82	Daniil Khlusevich	3	0	3
2	FW	(Russia)	13	Kirill Panchenko	2	1	3
2	FW	(Russia)	48	Yevgeni Lutsenko	2	1	3
6	MF	(Russia)	7	Daniil Lesovoy	2	0	2
6	MF	(Ghana)	21	Mohammed Kadiri	2	0	2
6	MF	(Russia)	7	Aleksandr Lomovitsky	2	0	2
6	FW	(Montenegro)	19	Luka Đorđević	2	0	2
6	MF	(Russia)	28	Vladislav Panteleyev	1	1	2
6	DF	(Germany)	4	Robert Bauer	1	1	2
12	MF	(Zambia)	44	Kings Kangwa	1	0	1
12	MF	(Belarus)	15	Yury Kavalyow	1	0	1
12	MF	(Serbia)	20	Goran Čaušić	1	0	1
12				Own goal	1	0	1
Total					28	4	32

=== Clean sheets ===
Place	Position	Nation	Number	Name	Premier League	Russian Cup	Total
1	GK	(Russia)	50	Yegor Shamov	6	1	7
2	GK	(Russia)	1	Artur Nigmatullin	1	0	1
Total					6	1	7

Note. Both Shamov & Nigmatullin featured in Arsenal Tula's 2-0 win over Dynamo Moscow on 22 August 2020

=== Disciplinary record ===
Number	Nation	Position	Name	Premier League		Russian Cup		Total	
Number	Nation	Position	Name	Booked	Sent off (straight red)	Booked	Sent off (straight red)	Booked	Sent off (straight red)
3	(Russia)	DF	Artyom Sokol	5	1	0	0	5	1
4	(Germany)	DF	Robert Bauer	9	0	2	0	11	0
5	(Russia)	DF	Taras Burlak	1	1	0	0	1	1
6	(Russia)	DF	Maksim Belyayev	4	0	0	0	4	0
7	(Russia)	MF	Aleksandr Lomovitsky	4	0	1	0	5	0
8	(Georgia (country))	DF	Gia Grigalava	6	0	1	0	7	0
9	(Russia)	DF	Kirill Kombarov	1	0	0	0	1	0
10	(Zambia)	MF	Evans Kangwa	7	1	1	0	8	1
11	(Russia)	MF	Sergei Tkachyov	7	1	0	0	7	1
13	(Russia)	FW	Kirill Panchenko	4	0	2	0	6	0
14	(Russia)	DF	Anri Khagush	2	0	0	0	2	0
15	(Belarus)	MF	Yury Kavalyow	2	0	0	0	2	0
18	(Belarus)	MF	Valeriy Gromyko	5	1	0	0	5	1
19	(Montenegro)	FW	Luka Đorđević	4	0	0	0	4	0
20	(Serbia)	MF	Goran Čaušić	6	0	0	0	6	0
21	(Russia)	MF	Igor Konovalov	1	0	0	0	1	0
23	(Russia)	MF	Igor Gorbatenko	2	0	0	0	2	0
28	(Russia)	MF	Vladislav Panteleyev	3	0	0	0	3	0
44	(Zambia)	MF	Kings Kangwa	5	1	1	0	6	1
48	(Russia)	FW	Yevgeni Lutsenko	2	0	2	1	4	1
55	(Russia)	DF	Nikolai Zlobin	1	0	0	0	1	0
70	(Bulgaria)	MF	Georgi Kostadinov	4	0	0	0	4	0
82	(Russia)	MF	Daniil Khlusevich	5	0	0	0	5	0
90	(Russia)	DF	Aleksandr Dovbnya	6	1	0	0	6	1
92	(Russia)	DF	Nikolai Rasskazov	2	0	0	0	2	0
Players away on loan:
71	(Russia)	DF	Aleksandr Denisov	1	0	0	0	1	0
Players who left Arsenal Tula during the season:
7	(Russia)	MF	Daniil Lesovoy	2	1	0	0	2	1
21	(Ghana)	MF	Mohammed Kadiri	1	0	0	0	1	0
Total				101	8	10	2	111	10
