= Artyom Sokol (Russian footballer) =

Russian footballer

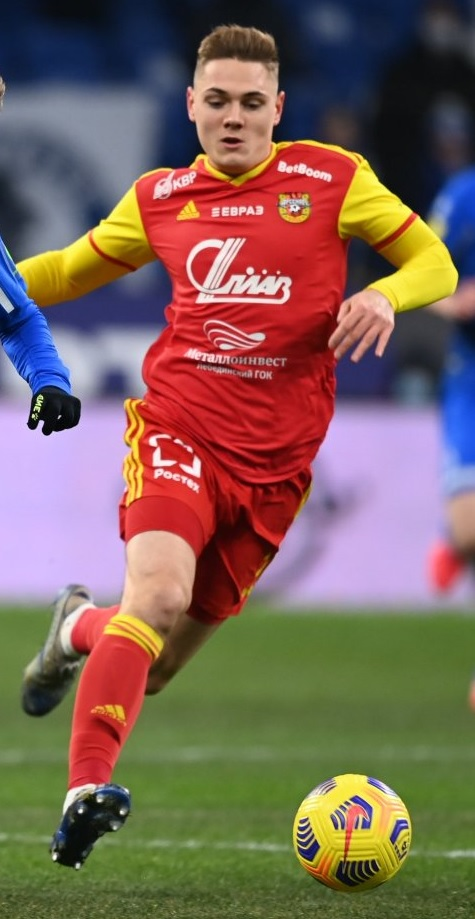
- Sokol with Arsenal Tula in 2020

Personal information
- Full name: Artyom Denisovich Sokol
- Date of birth: 11 June 1997 (age 29)
- Place of birth: Moscow, Russia
- Height: 1.85 m (6 ft 1 in)
- Position: Left-back

Team information
- Current team: Rodina Moscow
- Number: 88

Youth career
- –2017: Spartak Moscow
- 2018: Arsenal Tula

Senior career*
Years	Team	Apps	(Gls)
2016–2018	Spartak-2 Moscow	39	(1)
2018–2023	Arsenal Tula	60	(0)
2019	→ Tromsø (loan)	9	(0)
2019	→ Tromsø 2 (loan)	5	(0)
2021	→ Arsenal-2 Tula	1	(0)
2023–	Rodina Moscow	79	(1)

International career^{‡}
2015	Russia U19	3	(0)
- * Club domestic league appearances and goals as of 16 September 2026 ‡ National team caps and goals as of 16 November 2015

Artyom Denisovich Sokol (Russian: Артём Денисович Сокол; born 11 June 1997) is a Russian football player who plays for Rodina Moscow.

== Club career ==
He made his debut in the Russian Football National League for Spartak-2 Moscow on 12 March 2017 in a game against Yenisey Krasnoyarsk.

On 11 February 2019, he joined Norwegian club Tromsø on loan until 10 July 2019. On 14 June 2019, his loan was extended until the end of 2019.

He made his debut in the Russian Premier League for Arsenal Tula on 11 July 2020 in a game against Tambov, replacing Vladislav Panteleyev in added time.

== Career statistics ==
As of 16 September 2026

Club	Season	League			Cup		Other		Total	
Club	Season	Division	Apps	Goals	Apps	Goals	Apps	Goals	Apps	Goals
Spartak-2 Moscow	2015–16	Russian First League	0	0	—		3 (Note: Appearances in FNL Cup)	0	3	0
Spartak-2 Moscow	2016–17	Russian First League	9	0	—		3	0	12	0
Spartak-2 Moscow	2017–18	Russian First League	30	1	—		3	0	33	1
Spartak-2 Moscow	Total		39	1	0	0	9	0	48	1
Arsenal Tula	2018–19	Russian Premier League	0	0	0	0	—		0	0
Arsenal Tula	2019–20	Russian Premier League	3	0	—		—		3	0
Arsenal Tula	2020–21	Russian Premier League	15	0	2	0	—		17	0
Arsenal Tula	2021–22	Russian Premier League	20	0	3	1	—		23	1
Arsenal Tula	2022–23	Russian First League	22	0	1	0	—		23	0
Arsenal Tula	Total		60	0	6	1	0	0	66	1
Tromsø (loan)	2019	Eliteserien	9	0	1	0	—		10	0
Tromsø 2 (loan)	2019	Norwegian Third Division	5	0	—		—		5	0
Arsenal-2 Tula	2021–22	Russian Second League	1	0	—		—		1	0
Rodina Moscow	2023–24	Russian First League	19	1	3	0	—		22	1
Rodina Moscow	2024–25	Russian First League	28	0	1	0	—		29	0
Rodina Moscow	2025–26	Russian First League	26	0	1	0	—		27	0
Rodina Moscow	2026–27	Russian Premier League	6	0	1	0	—		7	0
Rodina Moscow	Total		79	1	6	0	0	0	85	1
Career total			193	2	13	1	9	0	215	3
