= Evans Kangwa =

Zambian footballer (born 1992)

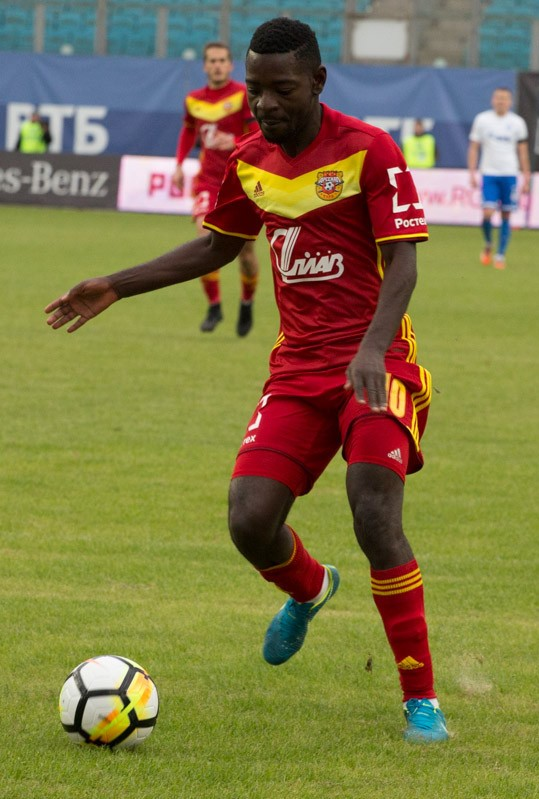
- Kangwa playing for Arsenal Tula in 2018.

Personal information
- Date of birth: 9 October 1992 (age 34)
- Place of birth: Kasama, Zambia
- Height: 1.80 m (5 ft 11 in)
- Position: Left winger

Senior career*
Years	Team	Apps	(Gls)
2010–2015	Nkana		
2014–2015	→ Hapoel Ra'anana (loan)	23	(4)
2015–2016	Hapoel Ra'anana	33	(11)
2016–2017	Gaziantepspor	24	(4)
2017–2023	Arsenal Tula	117	(16)
2023–2024	Qingdao Hainiu	49	(12)
2025	Abha	8	(1)
2025–2026	Nkana		
2026	Green Eagles		

International career
2011–2024	Zambia	32	(4)
- * Club domestic league appearances and goals

Evans Kangwa (born 9 October 1992) is a Zambian former international footballer who played as a left winger.

== Club career ==
Born in Kasama, Kangwa has played club football in Zambia for Nkana. He scored two league goals during the 2010 season, and one league goal during the 2011 season. In December 2012, it was announced that Kangwa would join English club Watford on trial in January 2013.

On 3 July 2014 he was loaned to Israeli club Hapoel Ra'anana He made his league debut for the club on 13 September 2014 in a 4–0 home victory over Hapoel Petah Tikva. He was replaced by Mamadou Touré Thiam in the 60th minute. He scored his first league goal for the club on 25 October 2014 in a 2–0 away win against Maccabi Haifa. His goal, the first of the match, came in the 13th minute.

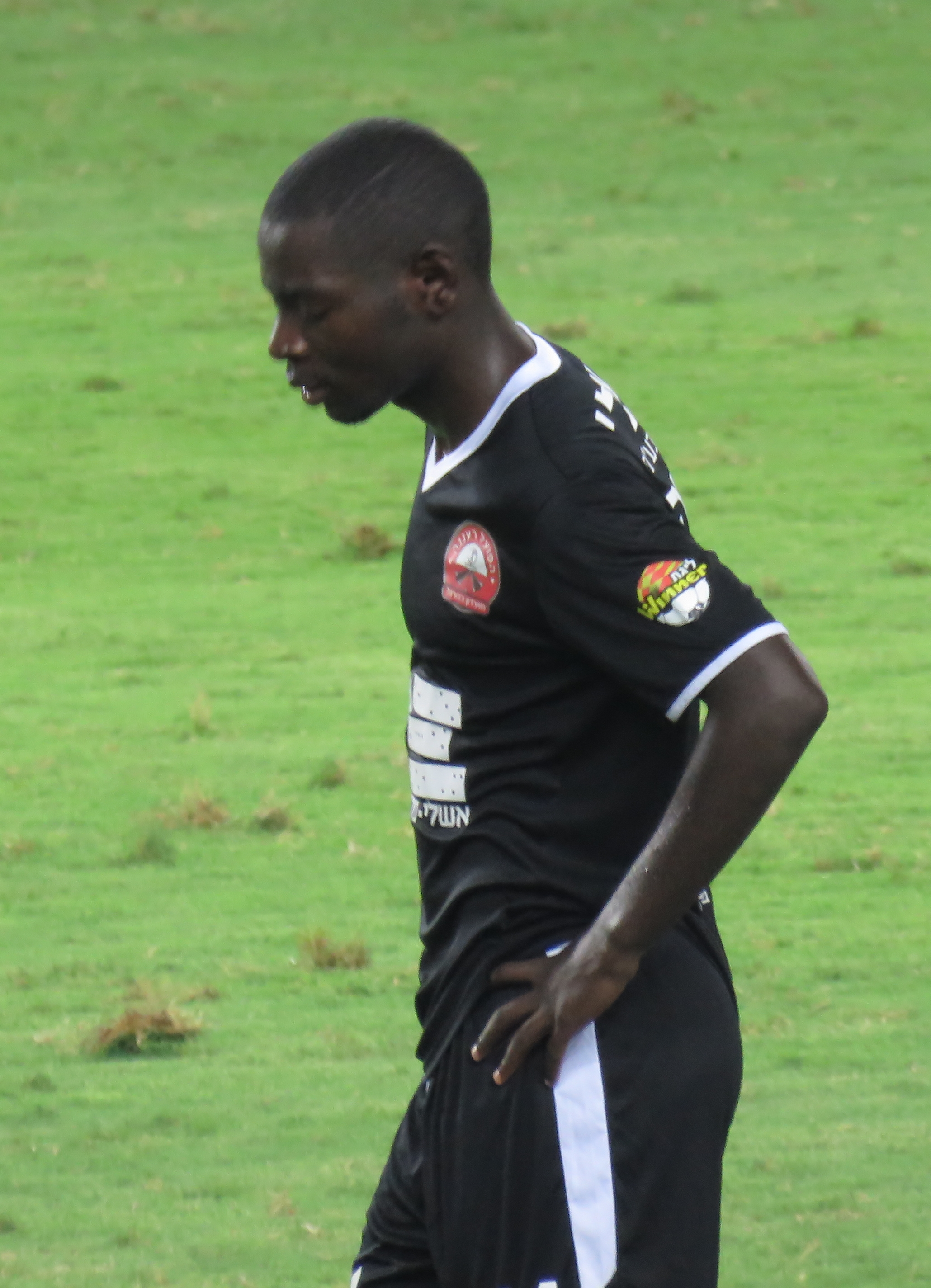
Kangwa playing for Hapoel Ra'anana in 2015.

On 1 August 2016, Kangwa transferred to Turkish Süper Lig club Gaziantepspor on a free transfer. His league debut came on 21 August 2016 in a 2–0 away defeat to Gençlerbirliği. He was replaced by Alpay Koçaklı in the 58th minute. His first league goal for the club came as a brace against Bursaspor on 1 October 2016. The match ended 3–2 in favor of Gaziantepspor. Kangwa started the game off with an assist on Nabil Ghilas's 31st-minute goal. He scored his first of the game in the 60th minute, with an assist from Bart van Hintum. He rounded the day off with a 79th-minute goal, assisted by substitute Daniel Larsson, that sealed the victory for his side that day.

On 26 August 2017, he moved to the Russian Premier League, signing with FC Arsenal Tula. He made his league debut for the club on 29 September 2017 in a 1–0 home victory over FC Krasnodar. He scored his first goal in the Russian Premier League on 15 October 2017 in a 1–0 away win against Zenit. His goal, assisted by Kirill Kombarov, came in the 73rd minute.

On 19 June 2021, he extended his contract with Arsenal Tula for two more seasons. Kangwa left Arsenal on 28 January 2023.

In February 2023, he joined Chinese Super League club Qingdao Hainiu.

On 1 February 2025, Kangwa joined Saudi club Abha.

== International career ==
Kangwa played for the Zambian under-20 side, winning the COSAFA U-20 Challenge Cup in 2011.

Kangwa made his senior debut for Zambia in 2011, and was selected for the final 23-man squad at the 2012 Africa Cup of Nations. Kangwa did not appear at the tournament, with manager Hervé Renard stating he did not want to rush the youngster.

In December 2014 he was named as part of Zambia's preliminary squad for the 2015 Africa Cup of Nations.

== Personal life ==
Kangwa's younger brother, Kings, also represents the Zambian national team.

== Career statistics ==
=== Club ===
As of match played 18 May 2025

Appearances and goals by club, season and competition
Club	Season	League			National Cup		League Cup		Continental		Other		Total	
Club	Season	Division	Apps	Goals	Apps	Goals	Apps	Goals	Apps	Goals	Apps	Goals	Apps	Goals
Hapoel Ra'anana (loan)	2014–15	Israeli Premier League	23	4	0	0	2	0	—		—		25	4
Hapoel Ra'anana	2015–16	Israeli Premier League	33	11	0	0	1	0	—		—		34	11
Gaziantepspor	2016–17	Süper Lig	24	4	2	0	—		—		—		26	4
Arsenal Tula	2017–18	Russian Premier League	18	2	1	0	—		—		—		19	2
Arsenal Tula	2018–19	Russian Premier League	25	4	4	2	—		—		—		29	6
Arsenal Tula	2019–20	Russian Premier League	22	3	1	0	—		0	0	—		23	3
Arsenal Tula	2020–21	Russian Premier League	25	4	3	0	—		—		—		28	4
Arsenal Tula	2021–22	Russian Premier League	22	3	3	1	—		—		—		25	4
Arsenal Tula	2022–23	Russian First League	5	0	0	0	—		—		—		5	0
Arsenal Tula	Total		117	16	12	3	—		0	0	—		129	19
Qingdao Hainiu	2023	Chinese Super League	22	7	3	0	—		—		—		25	7
Qingdao Hainiu	2024	Chinese Super League	27	5	1	0	—		—		—		28	5
Qingdao Hainiu	Total		49	12	4	0	—		—		—		53	12
Abha	2024–25	Saudi First Division League	8	1	—		—		—		—		8	1
Career total			254	48	18	3	3	0	0	0	0	0	275	51

=== International ===
As of match played 11 June 2024

National team	Year	Apps	Goals
Zambia
Zambia	2011	1	0
Zambia	2012	2	0
Zambia	2013	2	1
Zambia	2014	2	2
Zambia	2015	4	0
Zambia	2016	5	0
Zambia	2019	2	0
Zambia	2020	2	0
Zambia	2021	2	0
Zambia	2022	2	0
Zambia	2023	3	0
Zambia	2024	2	0
Total		29	3

International goals

Scores and results list Zambia's goal tally first.

No.	Date	Venue	Opponent	Score	Result	Competition
1.	5 December 2012	Prince Mohamed bin Fahd Stadium, Dammam, Saudi Arabia	Saudi Arabia	1–2	1–2	Friendly
2.	3 August 2013	Levy Mwanawasa Stadium, Ndola, Zambia	Botswana	2–0	2–0	2014 African Nations Championship qualification
3.	5 March 2014	Levy Mwanawasa Stadium, Ndola, Zambia	Uganda	1–1	2–1	Friendly
4.	5 March 2014	Levy Mwanawasa Stadium, Ndola, Zambia	Uganda	2–1	2–1	Friendly

== Honours ==
Nkana

- Zambian Premier League: 2013

Zambia

- Africa Cup of Nations: 2012
