= Shamov =

Shamov (masculine, Russian: Шамов) or Shamova (feminine, Russian: Шамова) is a Russian surname. Notable people with the surname include:

- Nikolai Schamov (born 1936), Soviet ski jumper
- Yegor Shamov (born 1994), Russian soccer player
