= Aleksandr Dovbnya (footballer, born 1996) =

Russian footballer

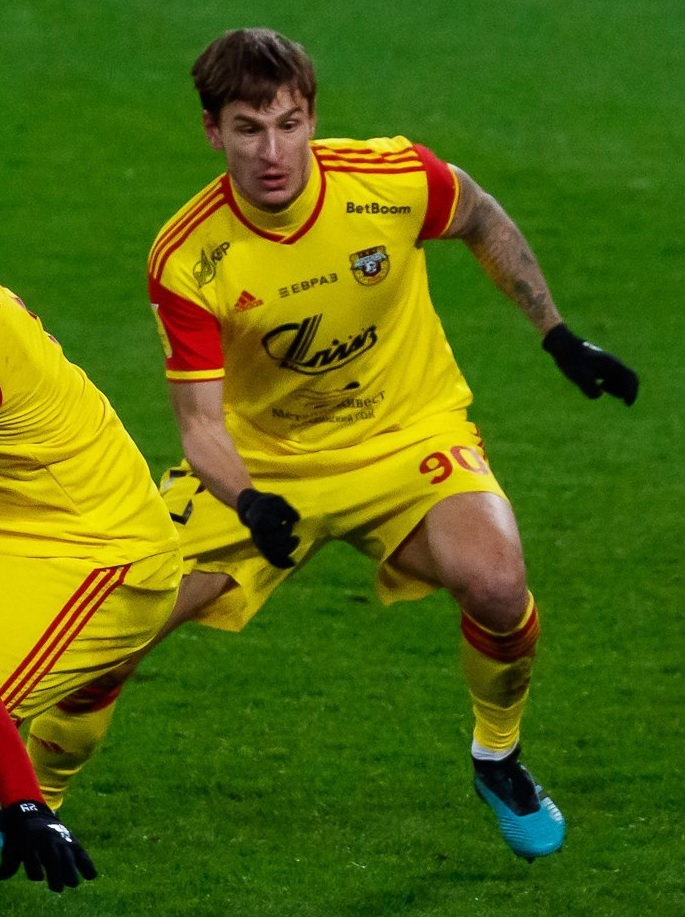
- Dovbnya with Arsenal Tula in 2020

Personal information
- Full name: Aleksandr Yevgenyevich Dovbnya
- Date of birth: 14 February 1996 (age 30)
- Place of birth: Moscow, Russia
- Height: 1.89 m (6 ft 2 in)
- Position: Centre back

Team information
- Current team: Amkal Moscow

Youth career
- Lokomotiv Moscow

Senior career*
Years	Team	Apps	(Gls)
2016–2018	Ethnikos Achna	40	(0)
2018–2019	Pafos	23	(2)
2019–2021	Arsenal Tula	20	(0)
2020	→ Rotor Volgograd (loan)	1	(0)
2022	Kyzylzhar	2	(0)
2022–	Amkal Moscow		

International career^{‡}
2011	Russia U-15	1	(0)
2011–2012	Russia U-16	10	(1)
2017–2018	Russia U-21	6	(0)
- * Club domestic league appearances and goals as of 23 October 2022 ‡ National team caps and goals as of 20 May 2018

Aleksandr Yevgenyevich Dovbnya (Russian: Александр Евгеньевич Довбня; born 14 February 1996) is a Russian professional footballer who plays as a defender for Amkal Moscow.

== Club career ==
On 16 July 2019, he signed a long-term contract with Russian Premier League club FC Arsenal Tula. On 29 January 2020, he joined FC Rotor Volgograd on loan until the end of the 2019–20 season. He made his Russian Premier League debut for Arsenal on 4 July 2020 in a game against FC Dynamo Moscow, replacing Aleksandr Denisov at half-time.

== International career ==
He was on the roster of the Russia national under-17 football team at the 2013 UEFA European Under-17 Championship, which Russia won, even though he didn't play in any games at the tournament.

== Career statistics ==
=== Club ===
As of match played 11 December 2021

Club	Season	League			Cup		Continental		Other		Total	
Club	Season	Division	Apps	Goals	Apps	Goals	Apps	Goals	Apps	Goals	Apps	Goals
Ethnikos Achna	2016–17	Cypriot First Division	21	0	1	0	–		–		22	0
Ethnikos Achna	2017–18	Cypriot First Division	19	0	0	0	–		–		19	0
Ethnikos Achna	Total		40	0	1	0	0	0	0	0	41	0
Pafos	2017–18	Cypriot First Division	7	1	3	0	–		–		10	1
Pafos	2018–19	Cypriot First Division	16	1	1	0	–		–		17	1
Pafos	Total		23	2	4	0	0	0	0	0	27	2
Arsenal Tula	2019–20	RPL	5	0	0	0	0	0	–		5	0
Arsenal Tula	2020–21	RPL	13	0	4	0	–		–		17	0
Arsenal Tula	2021–22	RPL	2	0	2	0	–		–		4	0
Arsenal Tula	Total		20	0	6	0	0	0	0	0	26	0
Rotor Volgograd (loan)	2019–20	FNL	1	0	0	0	–		–		1	0
Arsenal-2 Tula	2021–22	FNL 2	1	0	–		–		–		1	0
Career total			85	2	11	0	0	0	0	0	96	2

== Honours ==
Russia

- UEFA European Under-17 Championship: 2013
