= Ilya Bobryshov =

Russian football player

Personal information
- Full name: Ilya Mikhailovich Bobryshov
- Date of birth: 22 July 1997 (age 29)
- Place of birth: Kursk, Russia
- Height: 1.85 m (6 ft 1 in)
- Position: Defender

Youth career
- FC Avangard Kursk

Senior career*
Years	Team	Apps	(Gls)
2016–2025	FC Avangard Kursk	82	(4)
2018–2019	→ FC Khimik Novomoskovsk (loan)	19	(0)
2019	→ FC Ryazan (loan)	16	(0)
2025	FC Oryol	6	(1)
- * Club domestic league appearances and goals as of 1 November 2025

Ilya Mikhailovich Bobryshov (Russian: Илья Михайлович Бобрышов; born 22 July 1997) is a Russian football player.

== Club career ==
He made his debut in the Russian Football National League for FC Avangard Kursk on 12 May 2018 in a game against FC Olimpiyets Nizhny Novgorod.
