= Igor Telkov =

Russian footballer

Personal information
- Full name: Igor Sergeyevich Telkov
- Date of birth: 6 May 1989 (age 37)
- Place of birth: Novomoskovsk, Tula Oblast, Soviet Union
- Height: 1.90 m (6 ft 3 in)
- Position: Goalkeeper

Team information
- Current team: FC Torpedo Moscow (GK coach)

Youth career
- –2004: FC Don Novomoskovsk

Senior career*
Years	Team	Apps	(Gls)
2005–2006	FC Don Novomoskovsk	0	(0)
2007–2010	FC Saturn-2 Moscow Region	16	(0)
2009–2010	→ FC Gubkin (loan)	1	(0)
2011–2013	FC Gubkin	53	(0)
2013	FC Salyut Belgorod	4	(0)
2014–2018	FC Tyumen	41	(0)
2018	FC Salyut Belgorod	6	(0)
2019–2021	FC Khimik-Arsenal	7	(0)
Total		128	(0)

Managerial career
- 2021–2023: FC Arsenal-2 Tula (GK coach)
- 2024–2025: FC Torpedo Moscow (GK coach)
- 2025: FC Torpedo Moscow (U-21 GK coach)
- 2025–: FC Torpedo Moscow (GK coach)
- * Club domestic league appearances and goals

Igor Sergeyevich Telkov (Russian: Игорь Сергеевич Телков; born 6 May 1989) is a Russian professional football coach and former goalkeeper who is the goalkeeping coach with FC Torpedo Moscow.

== Club career ==
He made his Russian Football National League debut for FC Salyut Belgorod on 28 August 2013 in a game against FC Luch-Energiya Vladivostok.
