= Aleksandr Krikunenko =

Russian footballer

Personal information
- Full name: Aleksandr Yevgenyevich Krikunenko
- Date of birth: 3 August 1998 (age 28)
- Place of birth: Novaya Usman, Russia
- Height: 1.91 m (6 ft 3 in)
- Position: Defender

Team information
- Current team: FC Salyut Belgorod
- Number: 95

Youth career
- 2008–2009: DYuSSh Novaya Usman
- 2009–2014: FC Fakel Voronezh

Senior career*
Years	Team	Apps	(Gls)
2015–2016	FC Olimpik Novaya Usman		
2016–2018	FC Afips Afipsky	6	(0)
2018	FC Khimik Novomoskovsk	2	(0)
2018–2020	FC Arsenal Tula	0	(0)
2018–2020	→ FC Khimik-Arsenal	18	(1)
2020	FC Irtysh Omsk	9	(0)
2021	FC SKA Rostov-on-Don	16	(2)
2021–2023	FC Salyut Belgorod	58	(5)
2023–2024	FC Metallurg Lipetsk	38	(2)
2024–	FC Salyut Belgorod	55	(10)
- * Club domestic league appearances and goals as of 31 October 2026

Aleksandr Yevgenyevich Krikunenko (Russian: Александр Евгеньевич Крикуненко; born 3 August 1998) is a Russian football player who plays for FC Salyut Belgorod.

== Club career ==
He made his debut in the Russian Football National League for FC Irtysh Omsk on 1 August 2020 in a game against FC Yenisey Krasnoyarsk, as a starter.
