= Nikolai Zlobin (footballer) =

Russian footballer

Personal information
- Full name: Nikolai Dmitriyevich Zlobin
- Date of birth: 14 May 1996 (age 30)
- Place of birth: Lobnya, Russia
- Height: 1.72 m (5 ft 8 in)
- Position: Right-back

Youth career
- –2010: FC Dynamo Moscow
- 2010–2013: FC Spartak Moscow
- 2013: FC Rubin Kazan

Senior career*
Years	Team	Apps	(Gls)
2014	FC Dolgoprudny-2		
2014–2016	FC Tom-2 Tomsk	29	(1)
2016–2019	FC Saturn Ramenskoye	65	(3)
2019–2022	FC Arsenal Tula	1	(0)
2019–2021	→ FC Khimik-Arsenal	39	(4)
2021–2022	FC Arsenal-2 Tula	26	(3)
2022–2023	FC Chelyabinsk	24	(1)
2023	FC Arsenal-2 Tula	16	(2)
2024–2025	SC Astrakhan	57	(1)
- * Club domestic league appearances and goals as of 1 November 2025

Nikolai Dmitriyevich Zlobin (Russian: Николай Дмитриевич Злобин; born 14 May 1996) is a Russian football player.

== Club career ==
He made his debut in the Russian Premier League for FC Arsenal Tula on 3 October 2020 in a game against FC Tambov.
