= Yegor Shamov =

Russian footballer (born 1994)

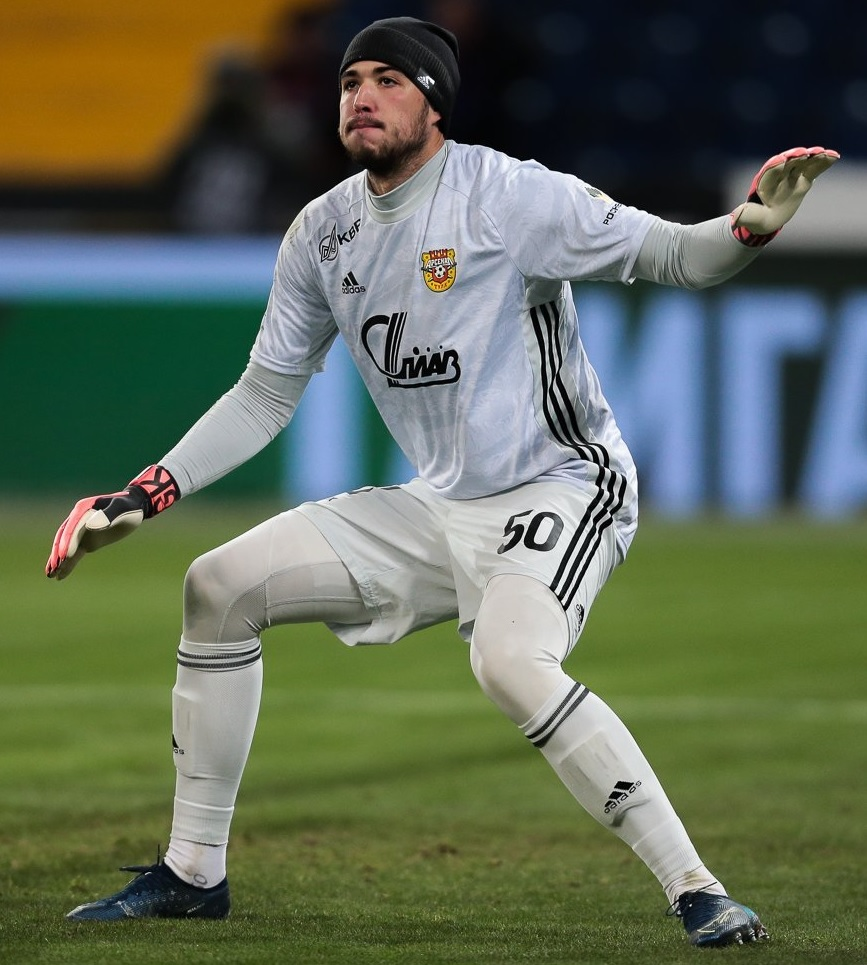
- Shamov with Arsenal Tula in 2019

Personal information
- Full name: Yegor Valentinovich Shamov
- Date of birth: 2 June 1994 (age 32)
- Place of birth: Moscow, Russia
- Height: 1.90 m (6 ft 3 in)
- Position: Goalkeeper

Team information
- Current team: Spartak Kostroma
- Number: 50

Youth career
- CSKA Moscow
- Yunost Moskvy-Spartak-2 (youth school)

Senior career*
Years	Team	Apps	(Gls)
2013–2015	Biolog-Novokubansk	23	(0)
2016–2017	Dynamo Bryansk	21	(0)
2017–2018	Luch-Energiya Vladivostok	9	(0)
2018–2023	Arsenal Tula	41	(0)
2019	→ Khimik-Arsenal	2	(0)
2023–2024	Rubin Kazan	1	(0)
2024–2026	Yenisey Krasnoyarsk	48	(0)
2026–	Spartak Kostroma	0	(0)
- * Club domestic league appearances and goals as of 31 May 2026

Yegor Valentinovich Shamov (Russian: Егор Валентинович Шамов; born 2 June 1994) is a Russian football goalkeeper who plays for Spartak Kostroma.

== Career ==
He made his debut in the Russian Second Division for Biolog-Novokubansk on 9 August 2013 in a game against Vityaz Krymsk.

He made his Russian Premier League debut for Arsenal Tula on 26 October 2019 in a game against Akhmat Grozny.

On 14 September 2023, Shamov signed with Rubin Kazan for the 2023–24 season. Shamov left Rubin as his contract expired on 20 June 2024.

== Career statistics ==
As of 16 May 2026

Club	Season	League			Cup		Continental		Total	
Club	Season	Division	Apps	Goals	Apps	Goals	Apps	Goals	Apps	Goals
Biolog-Novokubansk	2013–14	Russian Second League	15	0	1	0	–		16	0
Biolog-Novokubansk	2014–15	Russian Second League	8	0	1	0	–		9	0
Biolog-Novokubansk	Total		23	0	2	0	0	0	25	0
Dynamo Bryansk	2016–17	Russian Second League	21	0	2	0	–		23	0
Luch-Energia Vladivostok	2017–18	Russian First League	9	0	4	0	–		13	0
Arsenal Tula	2018–19	Russian Premier League	0	0	0	0	–		0	0
Arsenal Tula	2019–20	Russian Premier League	9	0	1	0	0	0	10	0
Arsenal Tula	2020–21	Russian Premier League	19	0	3	0	–		22	0
Arsenal Tula	2021–22	Russian Premier League	2	0	2	0	–		4	0
Arsenal Tula	2022–23	Russian First League	11	0	1	0	–		12	0
Arsenal Tula	Total		41	0	7	0	0	0	48	0
Khimik-Arsenal	2019–20	Russian Second League	2	0	–		–		2	0
Rubin Kazan	2023–24	Russian Premier League	1	0	2	0	–		3	0
Yenisey Krasnoyarsk	2024–25	Russian First League	15	0	0	0	–		15	0
Yenisey Krasnoyarsk	2025–26	Russian First League	33	0	0	0	–		33	0
Yenisey Krasnoyarsk	Total		48	0	0	0	0	0	48	0
Career total			145	0	17	0	0	0	162	0
