= Vladislav Panteleyev =

Russian footballer

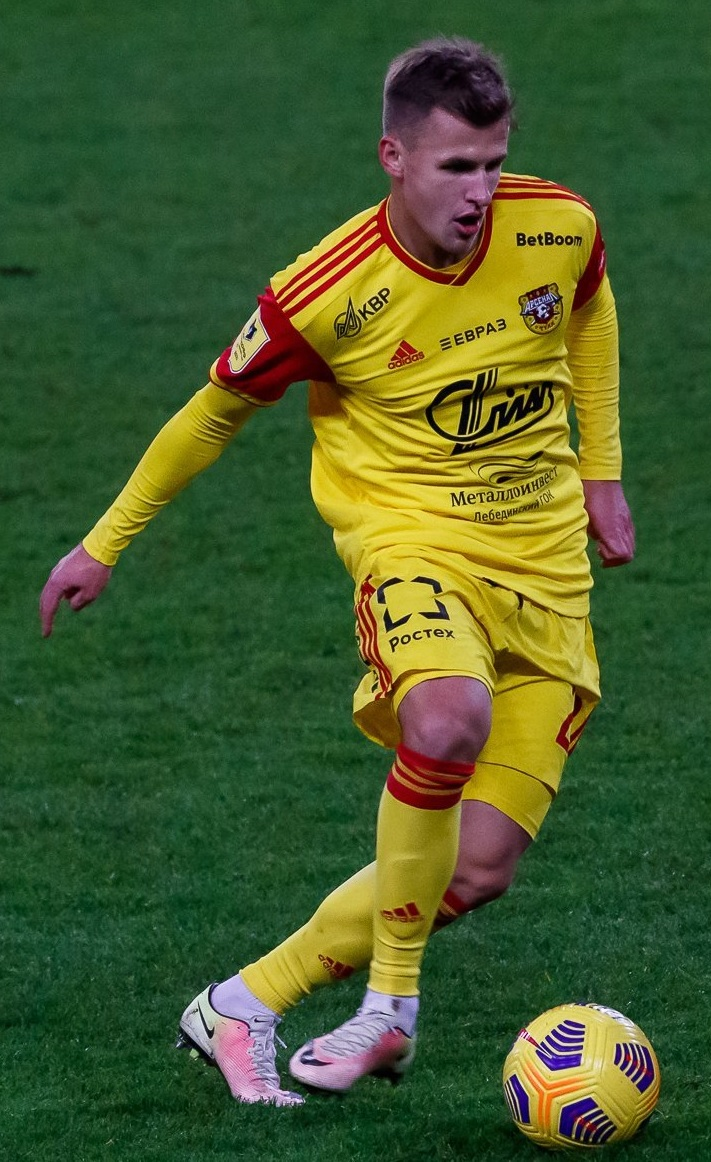
- Panteleyev with Arsenal Tula in 2020

Personal information
- Full name: Vladislav Vladimirovich Panteleyev
- Date of birth: 15 August 1996 (age 30)
- Place of birth: Aleksin, Russia
- Height: 1.78 m (5 ft 10 in)
- Position: Midfielder

Youth career
- –2016: Spartak Moscow

Senior career*
Years	Team	Apps	(Gls)
2014–2018	Spartak-2 Moscow	106	(26)
2018	Spartak Moscow	1	(0)
2019	Rubin Kazan	4	(0)
2019	Khimik-Arsenal	3	(2)
2019–2023	Arsenal Tula	38	(3)
2023	Arsenal-2 Tula	5	(1)
2024	Urartu	5	(0)

International career^{‡}
2012	Russia U16	5	(0)
2014	Russia U18	3	(1)
2018	Russia U21	3	(1)
- * Club domestic league appearances and goals as of 29 May 2024 ‡ National team caps and goals as of 16 October 2018

Vladislav Vladimirovich Panteleyev (Russian: Владислав Владимирович Пантелеев; born 15 August 1996) is a Russian football player who plays as a central midfielder.

== Club career ==
He made his professional debut in the Russian Professional Football League for FC Spartak-2 Moscow on 15 April 2014 in a game against FC Spartak Ryazan. He made his debut for the main squad of FC Spartak Moscow on 26 September 2018 in a Russian Cup game against FC Chernomorets Novorossiysk. He played his first Russian Premier League game for Spartak on 11 November 2018 in a game against FC Ufa as a 65th-minute substitute for Denis Glushakov.

On 27 December 2018, he signed a 3.5-year contract with FC Rubin Kazan. He left Rubin by mutual consent on 26 June 2019.

On 27 June 2019, he signed a 2-year contract with FC Arsenal Tula.

On 16 January 2024, Panteleyev joined Urartu in Armenia. On 26 May 2024, Panteleyev left Urartu by mutual agreement.

== Career statistics ==
As of 21 May 2022

Club	Season	League			Cup		Continental		Other		Total	
Club	Season	Division	Apps	Goals	Apps	Goals	Apps	Goals	Apps	Goals	Apps	Goals
Spartak-2 Moscow	2013–14	PFL	9	1	–		–		–		9	1
Spartak-2 Moscow	2014–15	PFL	3	0	–		–		–		3	0
Spartak-2 Moscow	2015–16	FNL	8	1	–		–		3 (Note: Appearances in the FNL Cup)	2	11	3
Spartak-2 Moscow	2016–17	FNL	32	5	–		–		4	1	36	6
Spartak-2 Moscow	2017–18	FNL	34	9	–		–		4	1	38	10
Spartak-2 Moscow	2018–19	FNL	20	10	–		–		–		20	10
Spartak-2 Moscow	Total		106	26	0	0	0	0	11	4	117	30
Spartak Moscow	2017–18	RPL	0	0	0	0	0	0	–		0	0
Spartak Moscow	2018–19	RPL	1	0	1	0	0	0	–		2	0
Spartak Moscow	Total		1	0	1	0	0	0	0	0	2	0
Rubin Kazan	2018–19	RPL	4	0	1	0	–		–		5	0
Khimik-Arsenal	2019–20	PFL	3	2	–		–		–		3	2
Arsenal Tula	2019–20	RPL	6	2	0	0	0	0	–		6	2
Arsenal Tula	2020–21	RPL	19	1	2	1	–		–		21	2
Arsenal Tula	2021–22	RPL	5	0	0	0	–		–		5	0
Arsenal Tula	Total		30	3	2	1	0	0	0	0	32	4
Career total			144	31	4	1	0	0	11	4	159	36
