= Aleksandr Konev =

Russian footballer

Personal information
- Full name: Aleksandr Vyacheslavovich Konev
- Date of birth: 2 April 2001 (age 25)
- Place of birth: Moscow, Russia
- Height: 1.83 m (6 ft 0 in)
- Position: Forward

Senior career*
| Years | Team | Apps | (Gls) |
| 2018–2020 | Chertanovo Moscow | 12 | (1) |
| 2018–2019 | → Chertanovo-2 Moscow | 8 | (4) |
| 2020–2021 | Arsenal Tula | 0 | (0) |
| 2022–2024 | Chertanovo Moscow | 55 | (16) |
| 2024 | Sibir Novosibirsk | 30 | (6) |
| 2025 | Amkal Moscow (amateur) | | |
| 2026 | Salyut Belgorod | 15 | (2) |

International career^{‡}
| 2017–2018 | Russia U17 | 6 | (3) |
| 2019 | Russia U18 | 4 | (0) |
- * Club domestic league appearances and goals as of 1 July 2026 ‡ National team caps and goals as of 12 June 2019

Aleksandr Vyacheslavovich Konev (Russian: Александр Вячеславович Конев; born 2 April 2001) is a Russian football player.

== Club career ==
He made his debut in the Russian Professional Football League for Chertanovo-2 Moscow on 24 July 2018 in a game against Dolgoprudny.

He made his Russian Football National League debut for Chertanovo Moscow on 13 April 2019 in a game against Tom Tomsk.
