= Kantemir Berkhamov =

Russian footballer

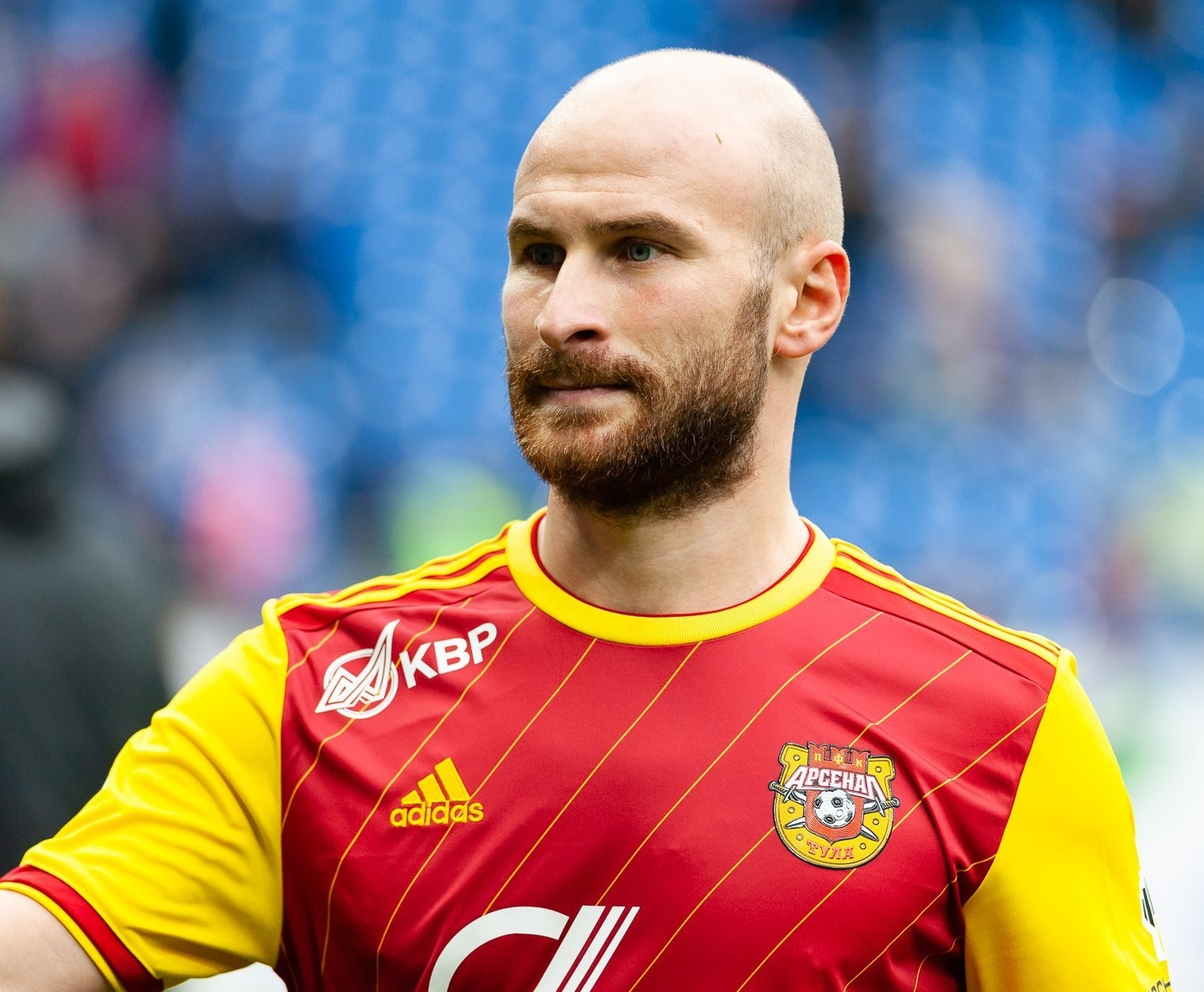
- Berkhamov with Arsenal Tula in 2019

Personal information
- Full name: Kantemir Mikhailovich Berkhamov
- Date of birth: 7 August 1988 (age 38)
- Place of birth: Nalchik, Soviet Union (now Russia)
- Height: 1.80 m (5 ft 11 in)
- Position: Midfielder

Youth career
- FC Lokomotiv Moscow

Senior career*
Years	Team	Apps	(Gls)
2005	FC Lokomotiv Kaluga	2	(0)
2005–2010	FC Lokomotiv Moscow	0	(0)
2009	→ PFC Spartak Nalchik (loan)	10	(0)
2010	→ FC Nizhny Novgorod (loan)	29	(8)
2011–2012	PFC Spartak Nalchik	13	(1)
2012–2014	FC Ural Sverdlovsk Oblast	31	(1)
2014–2015	FC Tosno	23	(4)
2015–2020	FC Arsenal Tula	75	(9)
2021	FC Kuban-Holding Pavlovskaya	7	(1)

International career
2007	Russia U19	12	(5)
- * Club domestic league appearances and goals

Kantemir Mikhailovich Berkhamov (Russian: Кантемир Михайлович Берхамов; born 7 August 1988) is a Russian former footballer who played as a central midfielder.

== Club career ==
He made his debut in the Russian Premier League on 22 March 2009 for PFC Spartak Nalchik in a game against FC Rubin Kazan.

== Career statistics ==
=== Club ===
As of 13 May 2018

Club	Season	League			Cup		Continental		Other		Total	
Club	Season	Division	Apps	Goals	Apps	Goals	Apps	Goals	Apps	Goals	Apps	Goals
Lokomotiv Kaluga	2005	PFL	2	0	0	0	–		–		2	0
Lokomotiv Moscow	2005	Russian Premier League	0	0	0	0	0	0	–		0	0
Lokomotiv Moscow	2006	Russian Premier League	0	0	0	0	0	0	–		0	0
Lokomotiv Moscow	2007	Russian Premier League	0	0	0	0	0	0	–		0	0
Lokomotiv Moscow	2008	Russian Premier League	0	0	0	0	–		–		0	0
Lokomotiv Moscow	Total		0	0	0	0	0	0	0	0	0	0
Spartak Nalchik	2008	Russian Premier League	0	0	0	0	–		–		0	0
Spartak Nalchik	2009	Russian Premier League	10	0	1	0	–		–		11	0
Nizhny Novgorod	2010	FNL	29	8	1	0	–		–		30	8
Spartak Nalchik	2011–12	Russian Premier League	13	1	0	0	–		–		13	1
Spartak Nalchik	Total (2 spells)		23	1	1	0	0	0	0	0	24	1
Ural Yekaterinburg	2012–13	FNL	19	1	2	0	–		–		21	1
Ural Yekaterinburg	2013–14	Russian Premier League	12	0	0	0	–		–		12	0
Ural Yekaterinburg	Total		31	1	2	0	0	0	0	0	33	1
Tosno	2014–15	FNL	23	4	1	1	–		2 (Note: Two appearances in promotion play-offs)	0	26	5
Arsenal Tula	2015–16	FNL	30	5	1	0	–		–		31	5
Arsenal Tula	2016–17	Russian Premier League	11	0	1	0	–		2 (Note: Two appearances in relegation play-offs)	0	14	0
Arsenal Tula	2017–18	Russian Premier League	17	3	0	0	–		–		17	3
Arsenal Tula	Total		58	8	2	0	0	0	2	0	62	8
Career total			166	22	7	1	0	0	4	0	177	23
