= Nikolai Rasskazov =

Russian footballer

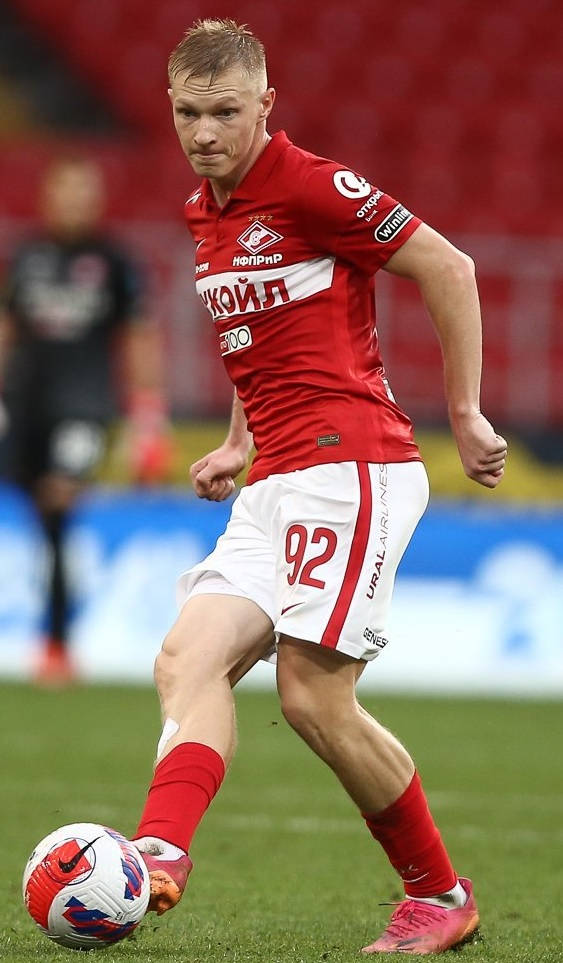
- Rasskazov with Spartak Moscow in 2021

Personal information
- Full name: Nikolai Olegovich Rasskazov
- Date of birth: 4 January 1998 (age 28)
- Place of birth: Yefremov, Russia
- Height: 1.78 m (5 ft 10 in)
- Position: Right-back

Team information
- Current team: PFC Krylia Sovetov Samara
- Number: 15

Youth career
- –2018: FC Spartak Moscow

Senior career*
Years	Team	Apps	(Gls)
2017–2020	FC Spartak-2 Moscow	21	(1)
2017–2023	FC Spartak Moscow	58	(2)
2020–2021	→ FC Arsenal Tula (loan)	16	(0)
2023–	PFC Krylia Sovetov Samara	102	(4)

International career^{‡}
2013	Russia U-15	10	(0)
2013–2014	Russia U-16	8	(0)
2014–2015	Russia U-17	8	(0)
2016	Russia U-18	3	(0)
2016	Russia U-19	5	(0)
2017–2020	Russia U-21	18	(1)
- * Club domestic league appearances and goals as of 8 November 2026 ‡ National team caps and goals as of 8 September 2020

Nikolai Olegovich Rasskazov (Russian: Никола́й Оле́гович Расска́зов; born 4 January 1998) is a Russian football player who plays as a right-back for PFC Krylia Sovetov Samara.

== Club career ==
He made his debut in the Russian Football National League for FC Spartak-2 Moscow on 23 March 2017 in a game against FC Baltika Kaliningrad.

He made his debut in the Russian Premier League for FC Spartak Moscow due to the injury of Salvatore Bocchetti on 11 August 2018 as a starter in a game against FC Anzhi Makhachkala.

On 1 October 2020, he joined FC Arsenal Tula on loan.

On 8 June 2022, Rasskazov extended his contract with Spartak until 2023.

On 27 January 2023, Rasskazov signed a 3.5-year contract with PFC Krylia Sovetov Samara. On 18 June 2026, his contract was extended until June 2028.

== Career statistics ==
As of match played 8 November 2026

Appearances and goals by club, season and competition
Club	Season	League			Cup		Europe		Other		Total	
Club	Season	Division	Apps	Goals	Apps	Goals	Apps	Goals	Apps	Goals	Apps	Goals
Spartak-2 Moscow	2016–17	Russian Football National League	2	0	—		—		2 (Note: Appearances in the FNL Cup)	0	4	0
Spartak-2 Moscow	2017–18	Russian Football National League	16	1	—		—		—		16	1
Spartak-2 Moscow	2018–19	Russian Football National League	2	0	—		—		—		2	0
Spartak-2 Moscow	2020–21	Russian Football National League	1	0	—		—		—		1	0
Spartak-2 Moscow	Total		21	1	0	0	0	0	2	0	23	1
Spartak Moscow	2017–18	Russian Premier League	0	0	0	0	0	0	0	0	0	0
Spartak Moscow	2018–19	Russian Premier League	16	1	3	0	6 (Note: One appearance in the UEFA Champions League, five appearances in the UEFA Europa League)	0	—		25	1
Spartak Moscow	2019–20	Russian Premier League	20	1	4	0	1 (Note: Appearance in the UEFA Europa League)	0	—		25	1
Spartak Moscow	2020–21	Russian Premier League	0	0	0	0	—		—		0	0
Spartak Moscow	2021–22	Russian Premier League	18	0	2	0	5 (Note: Two appearances in the UEFA Champions League, three appearances in the UEFA Europa League)	0	—		25	0
Spartak Moscow	2022–23	Russian Premier League	4	0	6	1	—		1 (Note: Appearances in the Russian Super Cup)	0	11	1
Spartak Moscow	Total		58	2	14	1	12	0	1	0	85	3
Arsenal Tula (loan)	2020–21	Russian Premier League	16	0	1	0	—		—		17	0
Krylya Sovetov Samara	2022–23	Russian Premier League	12	1	5	0	—		—		17	1
Krylya Sovetov Samara	2023–24	Russian Premier League	26	2	5	0	—		—		31	2
Krylya Sovetov Samara	2024–25	Russian Premier League	24	0	2	0	—		—		26	0
Krylya Sovetov Samara	2025–26	Russian Premier League	26	1	10	0	—		—		36	1
Krylya Sovetov Samara	2026–27	Russian Premier League	14	0	1	0	—		—		15	0
Krylya Sovetov Samara	Total		102	4	23	0	—		—		125	4
Career total			197	7	39	1	12	0	3	0	251	8

== Honours ==
Spartak Moscow

- Russian Cup: 2021–22
