= Yury Petrovsky =

Russian footballer

Personal information
- Full name: Yury Vladimirovich Petrovsky
- Date of birth: 14 October 2000 (age 26)
- Place of birth: Saint Petersburg, Russia
- Height: 1.84 m (6 ft 0 in)
- Position: Midfielder

Team information
- Current team: Volgar Astrakhan
- Number: 23

Youth career
- –2013: Zenit St. Petersburg
- 2013–2015: Lokomotiv St. Petersburg
- 2015–2018: Dynamo St. Petersburg
- 2018–2020: Arsenal Tula

Senior career*
Years	Team	Apps	(Gls)
2020–2022	Baltika Kaliningrad	1	(0)
2020	→ Zorky Krasnogorsk (loan)	0	(0)
2020–2021	→ Tver (loan)	25	(2)
2021	→ Baltika-BFU Kaliningrad	15	(0)
2022	→ Salyut Belgorod (loan)	4	(0)
2022–2024	Baltika-BFU Kaliningrad	62	(5)
2024	Baltika Kaliningrad	0	(0)
2025	Kaluga	18	(0)
2025–	Volgar Astrakhan	51	(1)
- * Club domestic league appearances and goals as of 15 November 2026

Yury Vladimirovich Petrovsky (Russian: Юрий Владимирович Петровский; born 14 October 2000) is a Russian football player who plays for Volgar Astrakhan.

== Club career ==
He made his debut in the Russian Football National League for Baltika Kaliningrad on 17 July 2021 in a game against Tom Tomsk.
