= Sergei Podpaly =

Russian footballer (born 1963)

Sergei Podpaly Серге́й Подпалый
Personal information
- Full name: Sergei Ivanovich Podpaly
- Date of birth: 13 September 1963 (age 63)
- Place of birth: Kiev, Ukrainian SSR, Soviet Union
- Height: 1.77 m (5 ft 10 in)
- Position: Defender

Team information
- Current team: Leningradets Leningrad Oblast (manager)

Youth career
- 1979–1981: Vympel Kyiv

Senior career*
Years	Team	Apps	(Gls)
1982	Tsementnik Tsementozavodskoy		
1983–1987	Geolog Tyumen	141	(12)
1988	Zenit Leningrad	24	(2)
1989	Shakhtyor Donetsk	14	(1)
1989–1990	Zenit Leningrad	45	(0)
1991	Geolog Tyumen	20	(7)
1991–1994	Lokomotiv Moscow	73	(11)
1994	Hapoel Haifa	4	(0)
1995–1996	Dynamo Moscow	27	(1)
1996–1997	Dynamo Stavropol	26	(1)
1997–1998	Tyumen	25	(4)
1998	Lokomotiv Nizhny Novgorod	18	(0)
1999–2000	Torpedo-ZIL Moscow	32	(0)
2001	Gomel	12	(0)

International career
1992–1994	Russia	2	(0)

Managerial career
- 2001–2004: Gomel
- 2004: Torpedo-SKA Minsk
- 2005–2009: Nosta Novotroitsk
- 2010–2011: Tyumen
- 2011–2012: Ventspils
- 2013: Mordovia Saransk
- 2013–2014: Salyut Belgorod
- 2018–2019: Shakhtyor Soligorsk (assistant)
- 2019–2020: Khimik-Arsenal
- 2020: Arsenal Tula
- 2021: Khimik-Arsenal
- 2021: Arsenal-2 Tula
- 2022–2023: Arsenal Tula (director of sports)
- 2024: Shakhtyor Soligorsk (director of sports)
- 2024–2025: Shakhtyor Soligorsk
- 2025: Ryazan (director of sports)
- 2026–: Leningradets Leningrad Oblast
- * Club domestic league appearances and goals

Sergei Ivanovich Podpaly (Russian: Серге́й Иванович Подпалый; born 13 September 1963) is a Russian association football coach and former player who is the manager of Leningradets Leningrad Oblast.

== International career ==
Podpaly made his debut for Russia on 16 August 1992 in a friendly against Mexico. That was the first game Russia played under its name after the breakup of the Soviet Union.

== Coaching career ==
On 1 July 2020, he was appointed caretaker manager of Russian Premier League club FC Arsenal Tula. On 31 July 2020, he signed a contract to manage Arsenal for the 2020–21 season. He was dismissed by Arsenal on 2 November 2020.

== Honours ==
- Russian Premier League bronze: 1994
- Russian Cup: 1995
