= Roman Minayev =

Russian footballer

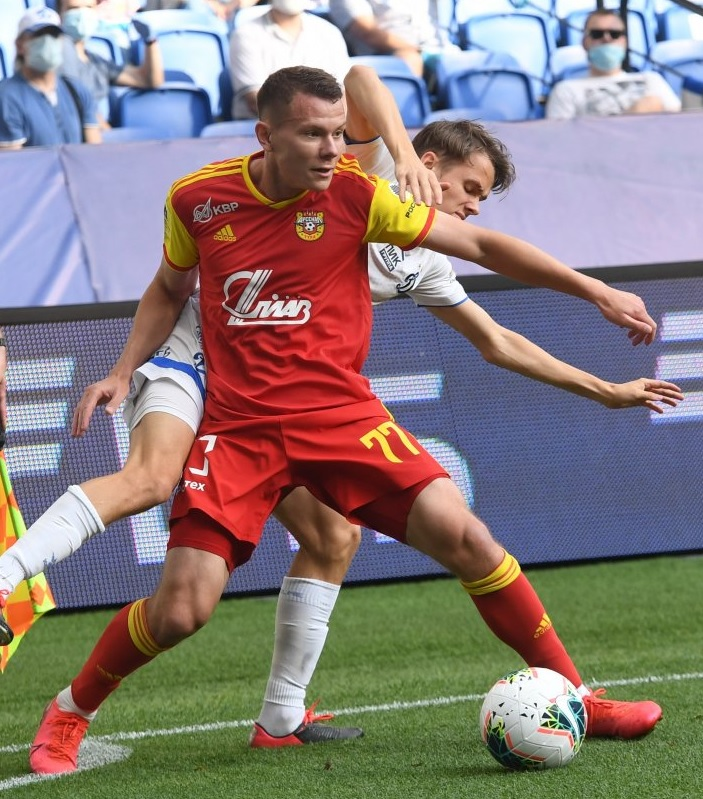
- Minayev with Arsenal Tula in 2020

Personal information
- Full name: Roman Eduardovich Minayev
- Date of birth: 24 December 1997 (age 28)
- Place of birth: Kursk, Russia
- Height: 1.78 m (5 ft 10 in)
- Position: Forward

Team information
- Current team: Vitebsk
- Number: 77

Senior career*
Years	Team	Apps	(Gls)
2016–2019	Avangard Kursk	79	(14)
2020–2021	Arsenal Tula	7	(0)
2021	→ Tambov (loan)	6	(0)
2021–2022	Rotor Volgograd	26	(1)
2022–2024	Ufa	61	(7)
2024	Arsenal Tula	4	(0)
2024–2025	Volga Ulyanovsk	27	(3)
2025	Salyut Belgorod	8	(1)
2026–	Vitebsk	13	(3)
- * Club domestic league appearances and goals as of 3 July 2026

Roman Eduardovich Minayev (Russian: Роман Эдуардович Минаев; born 24 December 1997) is a Russian football player who plays for Belarusian Premier League club Vitebsk.

== Club career ==
He made his debut in the Russian Professional Football League for Avangard Kursk on 20 July 2016 in a game against Energomash Belgorod. He made his Russian Football National League debut for Avangard on 22 July 2017 in a game against Krylia Sovetov Samara.

On 4 February 2020, he signed a 2.5-year contract with Russian Premier League club Arsenal Tula. He made his Russian Premier League debut for the club on 20 June 2020 in a game against Spartak Moscow.

On 28 June 2021, he moved to Rotor Volgograd.
