= Aleksandr Denisov =

Russian footballer

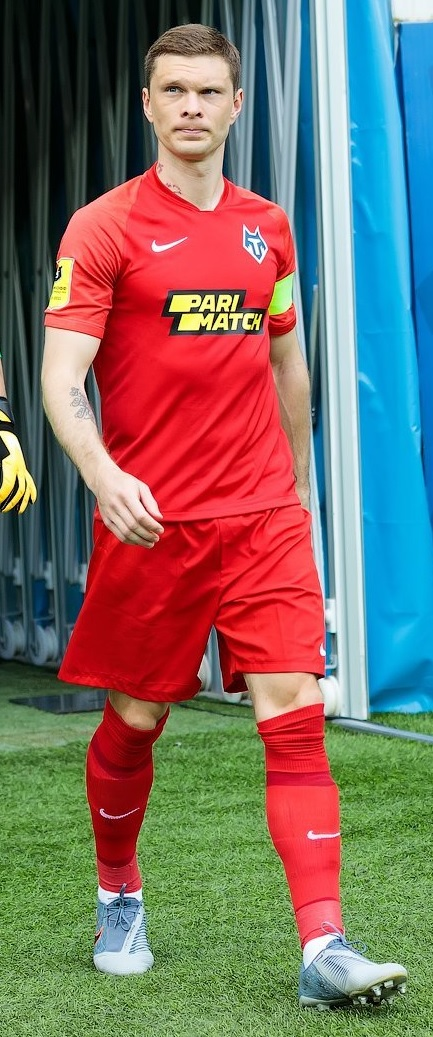
- Denisov with FC Tambov in 2021

Personal information
- Full name: Aleksandr Mikhailovich Denisov
- Date of birth: 23 February 1989 (age 37)
- Place of birth: Tula, USSR
- Height: 1.86 m (6 ft 1 in)
- Position: Centre back

Youth career
- FC Dynamo Moscow

Senior career*
Years	Team	Apps	(Gls)
2007–2010	FC Dynamo Moscow	7	(0)
2008	→ FC Salyut-Energiya Belgorod (loan)	6	(0)
2010	→ FC Dynamo Bryansk (loan)	14	(0)
2010–2011	FC Dynamo Bryansk	36	(0)
2012–2013	FC Fakel Voronezh	19	(0)
2013	FC Arsenal Tula	32	(0)
2014	FC Neftekhimik Nizhnekamsk	11	(0)
2014–2015	FC Volgar Astrakhan	23	(0)
2015–2021	FC Arsenal Tula	75	(2)
2021	→ FC Tambov (loan)	10	(0)
2021–2022	FC SKA-Khabarovsk	9	(0)
2022	FC KAMAZ Naberezhnye Chelny	4	(1)
2023–2024	FC Arsenal Tula	5	(0)

International career
2008	Russia U-19	10	(0)
2008–2010	Russia U-21	6	(1)
- * Club domestic league appearances and goals

Aleksandr Mikhailovich Denisov (Russian: Александр Михайлович Денисов; born 23 February 1989) is a Russian former footballer who played as a centre-back.

== Club career ==
He made his debut in the Russian Premier League for FC Dynamo Moscow on 20 July 2008 in a game against FC Luch-Energiya Vladivostok.

== International career ==
Denisov was a part of the Russia U-21 side that was competing in the 2011 European Under-21 Championship qualification.

== Career statistics ==
=== Club ===
As of 13 May 2018

Club	Season	League			Cup		Continental		Other		Total	
Club	Season	Division	Apps	Goals	Apps	Goals	Apps	Goals	Apps	Goals	Apps	Goals
Dynamo Moscow	2007	Russian Premier League	0	0	0	0	–		–		0	0
Dynamo Moscow	2008	Russian Premier League	1	0	0	0	–		–		1	0
Salyut-Energia Belgorod	2008	FNL	6	0	1	0	–		–		7	0
Dynamo Moscow	2009	Russian Premier League	6	0	2	0	0	0	–		8	0
Dynamo Moscow	2010	Russian Premier League	0	0	–		–		–		0	0
Dynamo Moscow	Total (2 spells)		7	0	2	0	0	0	0	0	9	0
Dynamo Bryansk	2010	FNL	30	0	1	0	–		–		31	0
Dynamo Bryansk	2011–12	FNL	20	0	1	0	–		–		21	0
Dynamo Bryansk	Total		50	0	2	0	0	0	0	0	52	0
Fakel Voronezh	2011–12	FNL	10	0	1	0	–		–		11	0
Fakel Voronezh	2012–13	PFL	9	0	2	0	–		–		11	0
Fakel Voronezh	Total		19	0	3	0	0	0	0	0	22	0
Arsenal Tula	2012–13	PFL	11	0	–		–		–		11	0
Arsenal Tula	2013–14	FNL	21	0	0	0	–		–		21	0
Neftekhimik Nizhnekamsk	2013–14	FNL	11	0	–		–		–		11	0
Volgar Astrakhan	2014–15	FNL	23	0	1	0	–		–		24	0
Arsenal Tula	2015–16	FNL	36	1	1	0	–		–		37	1
Arsenal Tula	2016–17	Russian Premier League	10	1	1	0	–		1 (Note: One appearance in relegation play-offs)	0	12	1
Arsenal Tula	2017–18	Russian Premier League	9	0	1	0	–		–		10	0
Arsenal Tula	Total (2 spells)		87	2	3	0	0	0	1	0	91	2
Career total			203	2	12	0	0	0	1	0	216	2
