= Kirill Kombarov =

Russian footballer

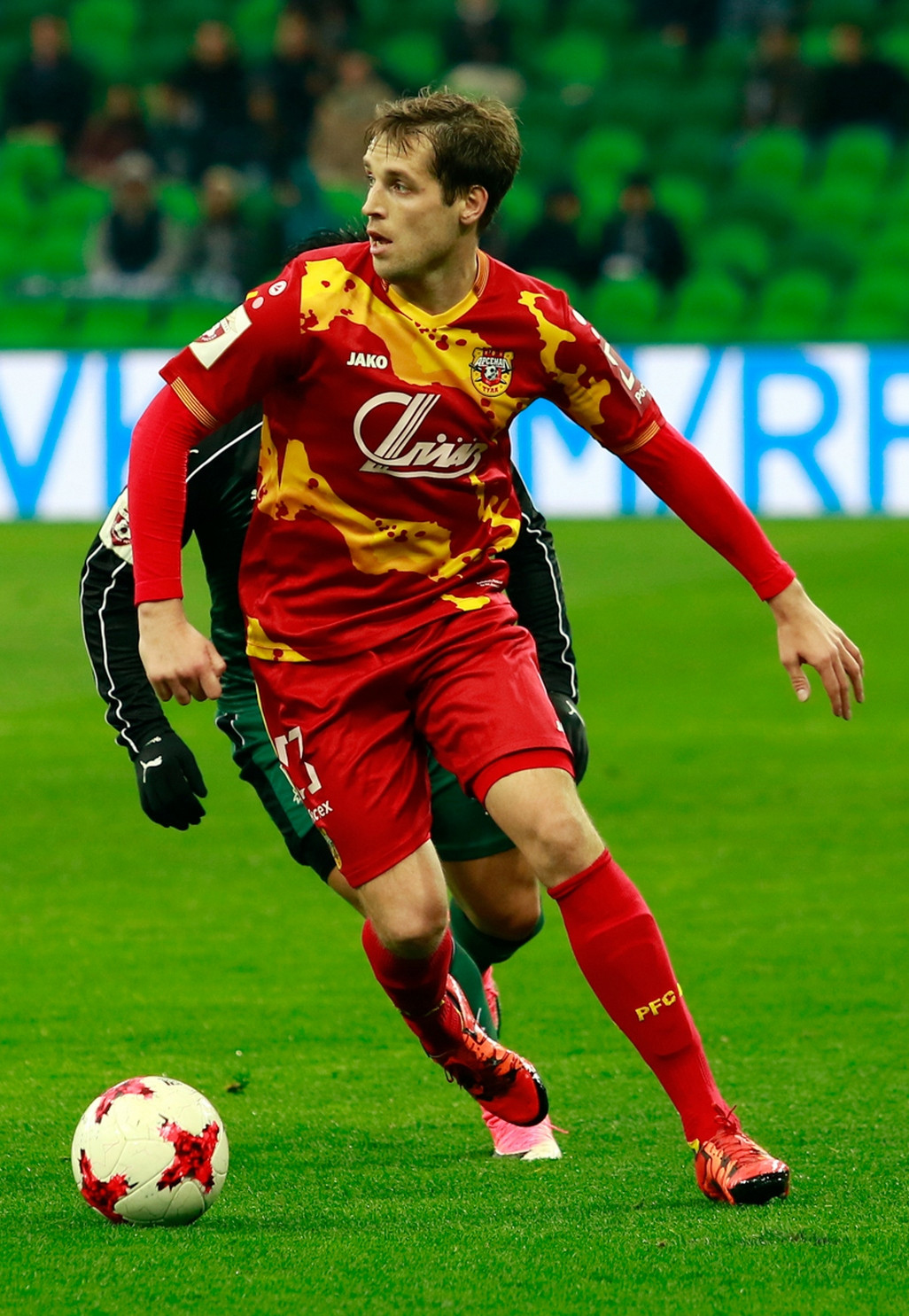
- Kombarov with Arsenal Tula in 2017

Personal information
- Full name: Kirill Vladimirovich Kombarov
- Date of birth: 22 January 1987 (age 39)
- Place of birth: Moscow, Soviet Union
- Height: 1.82 m (6 ft 0 in)
- Position: Right-back

Team information
- Current team: FC Arsenal-2 Tula (director of sports)

Youth career
- 1993–2001: Spartak Moscow
- 2001–2006: Dynamo Moscow

Senior career*
Years	Team	Apps	(Gls)
2006–2010	Dynamo Moscow	101	(7)
2010–2016	Spartak Moscow	73	(0)
2014–2015	→ Torpedo Moscow (loan)	23	(3)
2016	→ Spartak-2 Moscow	11	(1)
2016	Tom Tomsk	14	(0)
2017–2021	Arsenal Tula	81	(1)
Total		303	(12)

International career
2007–2008	Russia U-21	11	(3)
2011	Russia-2	2	(0)

Managerial career
- 2021–: FC Arsenal-2 Tula (director of sports)
- * Club domestic league appearances and goals

Kirill Vladimirovich Kombarov (Russian: Кири́лл Влади́мирович Комба́ров, IPA: [kʲɪˈrʲil vlɐˈdʲimʲɪrəvʲɪtɕ kɐmˈbarəf]; born 22 January 1987) is a Russian football official and a former player who played as a right-back. He is director of sports with FC Arsenal-2 Tula. He is an identical twin brother of Dmitri Kombarov.

== Career ==
Kirill started playing football at the age of 4. In 1993, Kirill and his brother Dmitri joined the Spartak Moscow football academy. After a conflict with the school coaches, the brothers left Spartak and joined the Dynamo Moscow academy.

Kirill made his first appearance for the main squad of Dynamo on 20 September 2006 in a Russian Cup game against Spartak Nizhny Novgorod.

In August 2010, the Kombarov brothers left Dynamo Moscow for their city rivals Spartak Moscow where they started their football education.

== Career statistics ==
=== Club ===
As of 13 May 2018

Club	Season	League			Cup		Continental		Other		Total	
Club	Season	Division	Apps	Goals	Apps	Goals	Apps	Goals	Apps	Goals	Apps	Goals
Dynamo Moscow	2004	Russian Premier League	0	0	0	0	–		–		0	0
Dynamo Moscow	2005	Russian Premier League	0	0	0	0	–		–		0	0
Dynamo Moscow	2006	Russian Premier League	9	0	1	0	–		–		10	0
Dynamo Moscow	2007	Russian Premier League	29	4	5	0	–		–		34	4
Dynamo Moscow	2008	Russian Premier League	26	1	2	1	–		–		28	2
Dynamo Moscow	2009	Russian Premier League	26	0	2	0	4	0	–		32	0
Dynamo Moscow	2010	Russian Premier League	11	2	0	0	–		–		11	2
Dynamo Moscow	Total		101	7	10	1	4	0	0	0	115	8
Spartak Moscow	2010	Russian Premier League	0	0	0	0	1	0	–		1	0
Spartak Moscow	2011–12	Russian Premier League	37	0	3	0	8	2	–		48	2
Spartak Moscow	2012–13	Russian Premier League	18	0	1	0	6	0	–		25	0
Spartak Moscow	2013–14	Russian Premier League	6	0	1	0	1	0	–		8	0
Spartak Moscow	2014–15	Russian Premier League	0	0	–		–		–		0	0
Torpedo Moscow	2014–15	Russian Premier League	23	3	2	0	–		–		25	3
Spartak Moscow	2015–16	Russian Premier League	12	0	1	0	–		–		13	0
Spartak Moscow	Total (2 spells)		73	0	6	0	16	2	0	0	95	2
Spartak-2 Moscow	2015–16	FNL	11	1	–		–		–		11	1
Tom Tomsk	2016–17	Russian Premier League	14	0	0	0	–		–		14	0
Arsenal Tula	2016–17	Russian Premier League	12	1	–		–		2 (Note: Two appearances in relegation play-offs)	1	14	2
Arsenal Tula	2017–18	Russian Premier League	24	0	0	0	–		–		24	0
Arsenal Tula	Total		36	1	0	0	0	0	2	1	38	2
Career total			258	12	18	1	20	2	2	1	298	16
