= FC Khimik-Arsenal =

Russian football club

- Full name: Football Club Khimik-Arsenal
- Founded: 1954
- Ground: Khimik Stadium, Novomoskovsk
- Capacity: 5200
- Chairman: Dmitry Trifonov
- Manager: Sergei Podpaly
- League: Russian Professional Football League, Group 3
- 2019–20: Zone Center, 5th
- Website: http://www.fchimik.ru/
Home colours	Away colours

FC Khimik-Arsenal (Russian: «Химик-Арсенал») is a Russian football team from Novomoskovsk. It played professionally from 1954 to 1979, from 1993 to 2007 and again from the 2017–18 season to 2020–21. They played on the second-highest level in the Soviet First League from 1954 to 1979, where their best result was 2nd place in Zone 1 in 1970. They were a farm-club for FC Arsenal Tula. For the 2021–22 season, Arsenal registered FC Arsenal-2 Tula for the third tier as their farm club.

== Team name history ==
- 1954–1955: FC Shakhtyor Stalinogorsk (Novomoskovsk was called Stalinogorsk at the time)
- 1956–1957: FC Shakhtyor Mosbass (Mosbass was a regional subdivision of Moscow Oblast that Stalinogorsk was a capital of at the time)
- 1958: FC Trud Stalinogorsk
- 1959–1960: FC Shakhtyor Stalinogorsk
- 1961–1992: FC Khimik Novomoskovsk
- 1993–2009: FC Don Novomoskovsk
- 2010–2019: FC Khimik Novomoskovsk
- 2019–p.d: FC Khimik-Arsenal
