= List of Kazakhstan football transfers summer 2015 =

This is a list of Kazakh football transfers in the summer transfer window 2015 by club. Only clubs of the 2015 Kazakhstan Premier League are included.

== Kazakhstan Premier League 2015 ==
=== Aktobe ===
In: Note: Flags indicate national team as defined under FIFA eligibility rules; some limited exceptions apply. Players may hold more than one non-FIFA nationality.

No.	Pos.	Nation	Player
20	MF	ROU	Ciprian Deac (from (Romania) CFR Cluj)

Out: Note: Flags indicate national team as defined under FIFA eligibility rules; some limited exceptions apply. Players may hold more than one non-FIFA nationality.

No.	Pos.	Nation	Player
29	MF	KAZ	Pavel Shabalin (to (Kazakhstan) Okzhetpes)
69	FW	UKR	Oleksiy Antonov (to (Azerbaijan) Gabala)

=== Astana ===
In: Note: Flags indicate national team as defined under FIFA eligibility rules; some limited exceptions apply. Players may hold more than one non-FIFA nationality.

No.	Pos.	Nation	Player
7	MF	KAZ	Serikzhan Muzhikov (from (Kazakhstan) Kaisar)
20	MF	KAZ	Zhakyp Kozhamberdy (from (Kazakhstan) Taraz)
24	MF	UKR	Denys Dedechko (from (Ukraine) Vorskla Poltava)
33	DF	SVN	Branko Ilić (from (Serbia) Partizan)
89	FW	COD	Junior Kabananga (from (Belgium) Cercle Brugge)
—	MF	KAZ	Rinat Khayrullin (from (Kazakhstan) Zhetysu)

Out: Note: Flags indicate national team as defined under FIFA eligibility rules; some limited exceptions apply. Players may hold more than one non-FIFA nationality.

No.	Pos.	Nation	Player
3	DF	DEN	Kasper Larsen (loan return to (Denmark) OB)
7	MF	KAZ	Ulan Konysbayev (loan to (Kazakhstan) Kairat)
13	DF	KAZ	Berik Shaikhov (to (Kazakhstan) Irtysh)
25	FW	KAZ	Toktar Zhangylyshbay (loan to (Kazakhstan) Kairat)

=== Atyrau ===
In: Note: Flags indicate national team as defined under FIFA eligibility rules; some limited exceptions apply. Players may hold more than one non-FIFA nationality.

No.	Pos.	Nation	Player
24	FW	UKR	Ruslan Fomin (from (Azerbaijan) Gabala)

Out: Note: Flags indicate national team as defined under FIFA eligibility rules; some limited exceptions apply. Players may hold more than one non-FIFA nationality.

No.	Pos.	Nation	Player
13	MF	KAZ	Aibar Nurybekov (to (Kazakhstan) Shakhter Karagandy)
14	FW	SRB	Miloš Trifunović (to (Serbia) Radnički Niš)

=== Irtysh ===
In: Note: Flags indicate national team as defined under FIFA eligibility rules; some limited exceptions apply. Players may hold more than one non-FIFA nationality.

No.	Pos.	Nation	Player
20	MF	CZE	Tomáš Jirsák (from (Bulgaria) Botev Plovdiv)
40	MF	POR	Carlos Fonseca (loan from (Bulgaria) Slavia Sofia)
50	DF	CTA	Fernander Kassaï (loan from (Bulgaria) Slavia Sofia)
80	MF	FRA	Alassane N'Diaye (from (Bulgaria) Beroe)
60	FW	BRA	Evandro Roncatto (from (Portugal) Oriental Lisboa)
70	FW	GAM	Toubabo (from (United Arab Emirates) Hatta Club)
90	DF	BRA	Antonio Ferreira (from (Brazil) Bragantino)
—	DF	KAZ	Berik Shaikhov (from (Kazakhstan) Astana)

Out: Note: Flags indicate national team as defined under FIFA eligibility rules; some limited exceptions apply. Players may hold more than one non-FIFA nationality.

No.	Pos.	Nation	Player
7	MF	RUS	Alan Gatagov (to (Kazakhstan) Taraz)
10	MF	KAZ	Alisher Suley (to (Kazakhstan) Taraz)
13	MF	KAZ	Alibek Ayaganov (loan to (Kazakhstan) Spartak Semey)
15	FW	BFA	Aristide Bancé
22	DF	RUS	Artyom Samsonov (to (Russia) Energomash Belgorod)
24	DF	MDA	Simeon Bulgaru (to (Moldova) Dacia Chișinău)
27	MF	RUS	Sergei Ignatyev (loan return to (Russia) Arsenal Tula)
55	DF	CRO	Ivan Graf
70	FW	GAM	Toubabo
89	FW	NGA	Izu Azuka (to (Kazakhstan) Taraz)

=== Kairat ===
In: Note: Flags indicate national team as defined under FIFA eligibility rules; some limited exceptions apply. Players may hold more than one non-FIFA nationality.

No.	Pos.	Nation	Player
4	DF	BRA	Bruno Soares (from (Germany) Fortuna Düsseldorf)
27	MF	KAZ	Ulan Konysbayev (loan from (Kazakhstan) Astana)
28	FW	SRB	Djordje Despotović (loan from (Serbia) Red Star Belgrade)
29	FW	KAZ	Toktar Zhangylyshbay (loan from (Kazakhstan) Astana)
44	MF	UKR	Anatoliy Tymoshchuk (from (Russia) Zenit St.Petersburg)

Out: Note: Flags indicate national team as defined under FIFA eligibility rules; some limited exceptions apply. Players may hold more than one non-FIFA nationality.

No.	Pos.	Nation	Player
21	FW	GAM	Momodou Ceesay
23	MF	KAZ	Ilia Kalinin (to (Kazakhstan) Kaisar)
—	MF	BRA	Paulo César (loan return to (Brazil) Corinthians)

=== Kaisar ===
In: Note: Flags indicate national team as defined under FIFA eligibility rules; some limited exceptions apply. Players may hold more than one non-FIFA nationality.

No.	Pos.	Nation	Player
15	FW	BUL	Georgi Karaneychev (from (Moldova) Tiraspol)
19	MF	CRO	Josip Knežević
27	DF	BLR	Anton Matsveenka (from (Belarus) Torpedo-BelAZ Zhodino)
77	MF	KAZ	Ilia Kalinin (from (Kazakhstan) Kairat)

Out: Note: Flags indicate national team as defined under FIFA eligibility rules; some limited exceptions apply. Players may hold more than one non-FIFA nationality.

No.	Pos.	Nation	Player
7	MF	KAZ	Serikzhan Muzhikov (to (Kazakhstan) Astana)
10	MF	KAZ	Sergei Skorykh (to (Kazakhstan) Shakhter Karagandy)
20	MF	UKR	Vladyslav Nekhtiy
25	DF	BUL	Plamen Dimov (to (Kazakhstan) Shakhter Karagandy)
31	DF	KAZ	Aleksei Muldarov (to (Kazakhstan) Shakhter Karagandy)
33	FW	SVK	Juraj Piroska (to (Slovakia) Spartak Myjava)
86	FW	CRO	Edin Junuzović (to (Kazakhstan) Ordabasy)

=== Okzhetpes ===
In: Note: Flags indicate national team as defined under FIFA eligibility rules; some limited exceptions apply. Players may hold more than one non-FIFA nationality.

No.	Pos.	Nation	Player
27	MF	KAZ	Pavel Shabalin (from (Kazakhstan) Aktobe)
28	FW	KAZ	Sergey Gridin
29	MF	SRB	Ivan Cvetković (from (Kazakhstan) Zhetysu)

Out: Note: Flags indicate national team as defined under FIFA eligibility rules; some limited exceptions apply. Players may hold more than one non-FIFA nationality.

No.	Pos.	Nation	Player
16	DF	KAZ	Yevgeni Goryachi (to (Kazakhstan) Zhetysu)
21	MF	CAN	Joseph Di Chiara

=== Ordabasy ===
In: Note: Flags indicate national team as defined under FIFA eligibility rules; some limited exceptions apply. Players may hold more than one non-FIFA nationality.

No.	Pos.	Nation	Player
28	FW	CRO	Edin Junuzović (from (Kazakhstan) Kaisar)

Out: Note: Flags indicate national team as defined under FIFA eligibility rules; some limited exceptions apply. Players may hold more than one non-FIFA nationality.

No.	Pos.	Nation	Player

=== Shakhter Karagandy ===
In: Note: Flags indicate national team as defined under FIFA eligibility rules; some limited exceptions apply. Players may hold more than one non-FIFA nationality.

No.	Pos.	Nation	Player
3	DF	KAZ	Aleksei Muldarov (from (Kazakhstan) Kaisar)
7	MF	NED	Desley Ubbink (loan from (Kazakhstan) Taraz)
10	FW	UKR	Maksym Feshchuk (from (Ukraine) Hoverla Uzhhorod)
15	MF	KAZ	Aibar Nurybekov (from (Kazakhstan) Atyrau)
70	MF	BUL	Plamen Dimov (from (Kazakhstan) Kaisar)
84	MF	KAZ	Sergei Skorykh (from (Kazakhstan) Kaisar)

Out: Note: Flags indicate national team as defined under FIFA eligibility rules; some limited exceptions apply. Players may hold more than one non-FIFA nationality.

No.	Pos.	Nation	Player
5	MF	BRA	Pedro Sass
7	MF	KAZ	Gevorg Najaryan
10	MF	CRO	Nikola Pokrivač (to (Israel) Maccabi Petah Tikva)

=== Taraz ===
In: Note: Flags indicate national team as defined under FIFA eligibility rules; some limited exceptions apply. Players may hold more than one non-FIFA nationality.

No.	Pos.	Nation	Player
13	FW	NGA	Izu Azuka (from (Kazakhstan) Irtysh Pavlodar)
18	MF	KAZ	Alisher Suley (from (Kazakhstan) Irtysh Pavlodar)
74	MF	RUS	Alan Gatagov (from (Kazakhstan) Irtysh Pavlodar)

Out: Note: Flags indicate national team as defined under FIFA eligibility rules; some limited exceptions apply. Players may hold more than one non-FIFA nationality.

No.	Pos.	Nation	Player
10	MF	KAZ	Zhakyp Kozhamberdy (to (Kazakhstan) Astana)
18	MF	KAZ	Vitaliy Evstigneev
20	MF	NED	Desley Ubbink (loan to (Kazakhstan) Shakhter Karagandy)

=== Tobol ===
In: Note: Flags indicate national team as defined under FIFA eligibility rules; some limited exceptions apply. Players may hold more than one non-FIFA nationality.

No.	Pos.	Nation	Player
23	DF	UKR	Serhiy Yavorskyi (from (Ukraine) Illichivets Mariupol)
78	FW	BLR	Ihar Zyankovich (from (Turkey) Elazığspor)
99	FW	LTU	Deivydas Matulevičius (from (Romania) Pandurii Târgu Jiu)

Out: Note: Flags indicate national team as defined under FIFA eligibility rules; some limited exceptions apply. Players may hold more than one non-FIFA nationality.

No.	Pos.	Nation	Player
6	MF	ARM	Karlen Mkrtchyan
16	MF	EST	Sergei Mošnikov
25	DF	CZE	Stepan Kucera

=== Zhetysu ===
In: Note: Flags indicate national team as defined under FIFA eligibility rules; some limited exceptions apply. Players may hold more than one non-FIFA nationality.

No.	Pos.	Nation	Player
6	MF	RUS	Mikhail Petrolay (loan from (Russia) Rubin Kazan)
14	DF	KAZ	Yevgeni Goryachi (from (Kazakhstan) Okzhetpes)
19	MF	UZB	Bobir Davlyatov (loan from (Russia) Rubin Kazan)
21	FW	AZE	Elbeyi Guliyev (loan from (Russia) Ural)
23	FW	RUS	Ruslan Galiakberov (loan from (Russia) Rubin Kazan)
88	DF	RUS	Aleksei Gerasimov (loan from (Russia) Ural)
91	MF	RUS	Ilsur Samigullin (loan from (Russia) Rubin Kazan)

Out: Note: Flags indicate national team as defined under FIFA eligibility rules; some limited exceptions apply. Players may hold more than one non-FIFA nationality.

No.	Pos.	Nation	Player
3	MF	LTU	Gediminas Vičius
6	MF	KAZ	Denis Rodionov
14	DF	KAZ	Aleksandr Kirov
19	MF	KAZ	Rinat Khayrullin (to (Kazakhstan) Astana)
21	DF	SRB	Miloš Mihajlov (to (Serbia) Voždovac)
23	DF	KAZ	Ashat Mynbaev
24	DF	KAZ	Viktor Kovalev (Retired)
31	MF	SRB	Ivan Cvetković (to (Kazakhstan) Okzhetpes)
89	FW	SRB	Djordje Despotović (loan return to (Serbia) Red Star Belgrade)
