= 2015 FC Zhetysu season =

FC Zhetysu
2015 season
- Chairman: Evgeniy Nam
- Manager: Askar Kozhabergenov (until 20 April); Ivan Azovskiy(caretaker) (20 April - 28 May )
- Stadium: Zhetysu Stadium
- Kazakhstan Premier League: 11th
- Kazakhstan Cup: Quarterfinal vs Tobol
- Top goalscorer: League: Dušan Savić (12); All: Dušan Savić (12)
Home colours	Away colours

The 2015 FC Zhetysu season is the 9th successive season that the club playing in the Kazakhstan Premier League, the highest tier of association football in Kazakhstan, and 19th in total. Zhetysu will also take part in the Kazakhstan Cup.

Askar Kozhabergenov resigned as the club's manager on 20 April 2015, with Ivan Azovskiy taking over in a caretaker capacity. On 28 May, Azovskiy was appointed as the club's permanent manager.

== Squad ==
As of 24 September 2015

Note: Flags indicate national team as defined under FIFA eligibility rules; some limited exceptions apply. Players may hold more than one non-FIFA nationality.

No.	Pos.	Nation	Player
1	GK	KAZ	Andrey Shabanov
2	DF	KAZ	Temirlan Adilkhanov
4	DF	TJK	Davron Ergashev
5	MF	KAZ	Marat Shakhmetov
6	MF	RUS	Mikhail Petrolay (loan from Rubin Kazan)
7	MF	KAZ	Sayat Sariyev
8	DF	KAZ	Serik Sagyndykov
9	FW	KAZ	Bauyrzhan Turysbek
10	FW	MKD	Dušan Savić
11	MF	KAZ	Marlan Muzhikov
13	DF	KAZ	Ilyas Amirseitov
14	DF	KAZ	Yevgeni Goryachi

No.	Pos.	Nation	Player
15	MF	KAZ	Ruslan Barzukayev
16	GK	KAZ	Rimas Martinkus
18	MF	KAZ	Maksim Azovskiy
19	MF	UZB	Bobir Davlatov (loan from Rubin Kazan)
20	GK	KAZ	Andrey Pasechenko
21	FW	AZE	Elbeyi Guliyev (loan from Ural)
22	GK	KAZ	Erik Duysenbekuly
23	FW	RUS	Ruslan Galiakberov (loan from Rubin Kazan)
25	MF	KAZ	Zhaksylyk Seydakhmetov
88	DF	RUS	Aleksei Gerasimov (loan from Ural)
91	MF	RUS	Ilsur Samigullin (loan from Rubin Kazan)

== Transfers ==
=== Winter ===
In: Note: Flags indicate national team as defined under FIFA eligibility rules; some limited exceptions apply. Players may hold more than one non-FIFA nationality.

No.	Pos.	Nation	Player
1	GK	KAZ	Andrey Shabanov (from (Kazakhstan) Atyrau)
3	DF	LTU	Gediminas Vičius (from (Kazakhstan) Shakhter Karagandy)
5	MF	KAZ	Marat Shakhmetov (from (Kazakhstan) Astana)
8	DF	KAZ	Serik Sagyndykov (from (Kazakhstan) Spartak Semey)
9	FW	KAZ	Bauyrzhan Turysbek (from (Serbia) Radnički Niš)
10	FW	MKD	Dušan Savić (from (Bulgaria) Slavia Sofia)
11	MF	KAZ	Marlan Muzhikov (from (Kazakhstan) Gefest)
13	MF	KAZ	Ilyas Amirseitov (from (Kazakhstan) Spartak Semey)
14	DF	KAZ	Aleksandr Kirov (from (Kazakhstan) Shakhter Karagandy)
18	MF	KAZ	Maksim Azovskiy (from (Kazakhstan) Spartak Semey)
19	MF	KAZ	Rinat Khayrullin (from (Kazakhstan) Astana)
21	DF	SRB	Miloš Mihajlov (from (Serbia) Voždovac)
23	DF	KAZ	Ashat Mynbaev
31	MF	SRB	Ivan Cvetković (from (Serbia) Jagodina)
89	FW	SRB	Djordje Despotović (loan from (Serbia) Red Star Belgrade)

Out: Note: Flags indicate national team as defined under FIFA eligibility rules; some limited exceptions apply. Players may hold more than one non-FIFA nationality.

No.	Pos.	Nation	Player
4	DF	CIV	Didier Kadio (to (Finland) Jaro)
7	FW	KAZ	Sergei Schaff
9	FW	KAZ	Beibut Tatishev
10	MF	KAZ	Konstantin Zarechny (to (Kazakhstan) Atyrau)
11	MF	KAZ	Konstantin Zotov
12	DF	KAZ	Ruslan Esatov (to (Kazakhstan) Atyrau)
14	DF	KAZ	Nurzhan Nusipzhanov
18	MF	KAZ	Taras Danilyuk
21	FW	BIH	Mersudin Ahmetović (to (Bosnia and Herzegovina) Sloboda Tuzla)
28	DF	KAZ	Vladislav Kuzmin (to (Kazakhstan) Atyrau)
29	DF	LTU	Arūnas Klimavičius (to (Kazakhstan) Tobol)
33	GK	KAZ	Vladimir Plotnikov (to (Kazakhstan) Kairat)
50	MF	KAZ	Alisher Yesimkhanov
77	MF	SRB	Marko Putinčanin
79	FW	CIV	Boti Goa

=== Summer ===
In: Note: Flags indicate national team as defined under FIFA eligibility rules; some limited exceptions apply. Players may hold more than one non-FIFA nationality.

No.	Pos.	Nation	Player
6	MF	RUS	Mikhail Petrolay (loan from (Russia) Rubin Kazan)
14	DF	KAZ	Yevgeni Goryachi (from (Kazakhstan) Okzhetpes)
19	MF	UZB	Bobir Davlatov (loan from (Russia) Rubin Kazan)
21	FW	AZE	Elbeyi Guliyev (loan from (Russia) Ural)
23	FW	RUS	Ruslan Galiakberov (loan from (Russia) Rubin Kazan)
88	DF	RUS	Aleksei Gerasimov (loan from (Russia) Ural)
91	MF	RUS	Ilsur Samigullin (loan from (Russia) Rubin Kazan)

Out: Note: Flags indicate national team as defined under FIFA eligibility rules; some limited exceptions apply. Players may hold more than one non-FIFA nationality.

No.	Pos.	Nation	Player
3	MF	LTU	Gediminas Vičius
6	MF	KAZ	Denis Rodionov
14	DF	KAZ	Aleksandr Kirov
19	MF	KAZ	Rinat Khayrullin (to (Kazakhstan) Astana)
21	DF	SRB	Miloš Mihajlov
23	DF	KAZ	Ashat Mynbaev
24	DF	KAZ	Viktor Kovalev (Retired)
31	MF	SRB	Ivan Cvetković (to (Kazakhstan) Okzhetpes)
89	FW	SRB	Djordje Despotović (loan return to (Serbia) Red Star Belgrade)

== Competitions ==
=== Kazakhstan Premier League ===
==== First round ====
===== Results summary =====
Overall								Home						Away					
Pld	W	D	L	GF	GA	GD	Pts	W	D	L	GF	GA	GD	W	D	L	GF	GA	GD
22	5	6	11	16	28	−12	21	4	3	4	12	11	+1	1	3	7	4	17	−13

Last updated: 28 July 2015.
Source: Soccerway

===== Results by round =====
Round	1	2	3	4	5	6	7	8	9	10	11	12	13	14	15	16	17	18	19	20	21	22
Ground	A	H	A	A	H	A	H	A	H	A	H	A	H	H	A	H	A	H	A	H	A	H
Result	D	D	L	L	D	L	L	L	W	D	L	L	L	L	L	W	W	D	L	W	L	W
Position	10	7	8	10	11	12	12	12	11	11	11	11	11	11	12	11	11	11	11	10	12	11

Source: Soccerway
A = Away; H = Home; W = Win; D = Draw; L = Loss

===== Results =====
7 March 2015 1	Kaisar	0 – 0	Zhetysu	Kyzylorda
15:00 (UTC+6)	Irismetov (yellow card) 59'	Summary	S.Sariyev (yellow card) 66'	Stadium: Gany Muratbayev Stadium; Attendance: 2,500; Referee: Bagdat Abdullaev

11 March 2015 2	Zhetysu	0 – 0	Tobol	Taldykorgan
15:00 (UTC+6)	S.Sagyndykov (yellow card) 74'	Summary	R.Aslan (yellow card) 7'; Kurgulin (yellow card) 72'	Stadium: Zhetysu Stadium; Attendance: 1,000; Referee: Timur Kumashev

15 March 2015 3	Kairat	2 – 0	Zhetysu	Almaty
17:00 (UTC+6)	B.Baitana (yellow card) 50'; E.Kuantayev 59'; Gohou 90+3'	Summary	Despotović (yellow card) 45'; Cvetković (yellow card) 68'; Azovskiy (yellow card) 71'; A.Pasechenko (yellow card) 90+2'	Stadium: Central Stadium; Attendance: 6,500; Referee: Igor Chesnokov

21 March 2015 4	Okzhetpes	2 – 0	Zhetysu	Kokshetau
16:00 (UTC+6)	Pawlaw (yellow card) 38'; Rotkovic 69' (yellow card) 90+2'; Buleshev 75'	Summary	Savić (yellow card) 39'	Stadium: Okzhetpes Stadium; Attendance: 500; Referee: Anatolyi Vishnichenko

5 April 2015 5	Zhetysu	2 – 2	Irtysh	Taldykorgan
15:00 (UTC+6)	Despotović 58'; Savić 67'	Summary	Samsonov (yellow card) 9'; Aliev (yellow card) 36' (goal) 89'; Azuka 75'	Stadium: Zhetysu Stadium; Attendance: 3,500; Referee: Aleksandr Aliyev

11 April 2015 6	Shakhter Karagandy	2 – 1	Zhetysu	Karaganda
16:00 (UTC+6)	Pokrivač (yellow card) 20'; Karpovich 27'; R.Murtazayev 90+1'	Summary	Despotović 44'; Ergashev (yellow card) 56'	Stadium: Shakhter Stadium; Attendance: 1,500; Referee: Marat Iskakov

15 April 2015 7	Zhetysu	1 – 2	Atyrau	Taldykorgan
17:00 (UTC+6)	S.Sariyev (yellow card) 23'; Ergashev (yellow card) 31'; Savić 57'; T.Adilkhanov (yellow card) 74'; Despotović (yellow card) 85'; Cvetković (yellow card) 90+4'	Summary	Arzhanov 15' (pen.); Baizhanov 67'; Narzikulov (yellow card) 90+4'	Stadium: Zhetysu Stadium; Referee: Bolat Karlibayev

19 April 2015 8	Aktobe	2 – 0	Zhetysu	Aktobe
17:00 (UTC+6)	D.Zhalmukan (yellow card) 41' (goal) 75'; E.Levin (yellow card) 57'; Khizhnichenko 65'	Summary	Ergashev (yellow card) 17'	Stadium: Central Stadium; Attendance: 3,000; Referee: Aydin Rakhimbayev

25 April 2015 9	Zhetysu	1 – 0	Taraz	Taldykorgan
17:00 (UTC+6)	Cvetković (yellow card) 74'; Despotović 90' (yellow card) 90+1'	Summary	D.Bashlay (yellow card) 46'; Mukhutdinov (yellow card) 74'	Stadium: Zhetysu Stadium; Attendance: 1,500; Referee: Igor Aleshin

2 May 2015 10	Ordabasy	0 – 0	Zhetysu	Shymkent
16:00 (UTC+6)	Božić (yellow card) 40'; Geynrikh (yellow card) 41'; E.Tungyshbaev (yellow card) 49'; Petrov (yellow card) 60'	Summary	S.Sagyndykov (yellow card) 40'	Stadium: Kazhimukan Munaitpasov Stadium; Attendance: 4,000; Referee: Artyom Kuchin

7 May 2015 11	Zhetysu	1 – 3	Astana	Taldykorgan
17:00 (UTC+6)	Despotović 30'; Cvetković (red card) 53'	Summary	Cañas 27'; Twumasi 57'; Beisebekov (yellow card) 77'; Shchetkin 86'	Stadium: Zhetysu Stadium; Attendance: 2,500; Referee: Ruslan Duzmambetov

16 May 2015 12	Tobol	3 – 1	Zhetysu	Kostanay
18:00 (UTC+6)	Kalu 37', 43', 71'	Summary	Savić 65'; S.Sagyndykov (yellow card) 69'	Stadium: Central Stadium; Attendance: 1,500; Referee: Marat Iskakov

24 May 2015 13	Zhetysu	0 – 3	Kairat	Taldykorgan
17:00 (UTC+6)		Summary	Islamkhan 17'; Pliyev (yellow card) 41'; Isael (yellow card) 76'; Gorman (yellow card) 81'; Gohou 83'; Kukeyev 89'	Stadium: Zhetysu Stadium; Attendance: 2,000; Referee: Bolat Karlibayev

29 May 2015 14	Zhetysu	0 – 1	Okzhetpes	Taldykorgan
18:30 (UTC+6)	S.Sagyndykov (yellow card) 15'; Turysbek (yellow card) 65'; Despotović (yellow card) 70'; Savić (yellow card) 90+2'	Summary	Rotković 30'; V.Kryukov (yellow card) 39'	Stadium: Zhetysu Stadium; Attendance: 2,000; Referee: Bagdat Abdullaev

6 June 2015 15	Irtysh	1 – 0	Zhetysu	Pavlodar
15:00 (UTC+6)	G.Sartakov (yellow card) 32'; Geteriev (yellow card) 36'; Smakov (yellow card) 49'; I.Graf (yellow card) 78'; Kislitsyn (yellow card) 89'	Summary	Ergashev (yellow card) 58'	Stadium: Central Stadium; Attendance: 2,500; Referee: Aydin Rakhimbayev

20 June 2015 16	Zhetysu	3 – 0	Shakhter Karagandy	Taldykorgan
18:00 (UTC+6)	Turysbek 5'; Savić 8', 80'; Shakhmetov (yellow card) 45'	Summary	Paryvaew (yellow card) 61'	Stadium: Zhetysu Stadium; Attendance: 2,000; Referee: Aleksandr Aliyev

24 June 2015 17	Atyrau	3 – 0^{1}	Zhetysu	Atyrau
20:00 (UTC+6)	Grigoryev 30'	Summary	Savić 27', 71'; S.Sagyndykov (yellow card) 47'; Ergashev (yellow card) 65'	Stadium: Munaishy Stadium; Attendance: 5,000; Referee: Akmalkhan Kholmatov

27 June 2015 18	Zhetysu	1 – 1	Aktobe	Taldykorgan
18:30 (UTC+6)	Ergashev (yellow card) 11'; Turysbek (yellow card) 22' (yellow-red card) 77'; Despotović 65'	Summary	D.Miroshnichenko (yellow card) 48'; Logvinenko (yellow card) 64'; Korobkin (yellow card) 76'; Pokatilov (yellow card) 77'; D.Zhalmukan 90+1'	Stadium: Zhetysu Stadium; Attendance: 2,000; Referee: Igor Chesnokov

4 July 2015 19	Taraz	2 – 0	Zhetysu	Taraz
19:00 (UTC+6)	Dosmagambetov (yellow card) 30'; A.Suley 61'; Pyschur 84'	Summary	Shakhmetov (yellow card) 27'; Vičius (yellow card) 32'	Stadium: Central Stadium; Attendance: 3,000; Referee: Marat Iskakov

12 July 2015 20	Zhetysu	3 – 0	Ordabasy	Taldykorgan
18:30 (UTC+6)	Savić 23' (pen.); Galiakberov 38'; S.Sagyndykov (yellow card) 75'; Turysbek 78'	Summary	T.Adyrbekov (yellow card) 77'; B.Beisenov (yellow card) 87'	Stadium: Zhetysu Stadium; Attendance: 2,000; Referee: Denis Tevyashov

18 July 2015 21	Astana	2 – 1	Zhetysu	Astana
17:30 (UTC+6)	Dedechko 5'; Maksimović 84'	Summary	Ergashev (yellow card) 26'; Galiakberov 75'; S.Sagyndykov (yellow card) 77'	Stadium: Astana Arena; Attendance: 3,000; Referee: Daniyar Sakhi

26 July 2015 22	Zhetysu	2 – 1	Kaisar	Taldykorgan
18:30 (UTC+6)	Galiakberov 12', 58'; A.Pasechenko (yellow card) 90+4'	Summary	Shestakov 21'; Karaneychev (yellow card) 26'	Stadium: Zhetysu Stadium; Attendance: 1,500; Referee: Timur Kumashev

===== League table =====
Pos	Team	Pld	W	D	L	GF	GA	GD	Pts	Qualification
8	Tobol	22	7	4	11	22	32	−10	25	Qualification for the relegation round
9	Taraz	22	7	3	12	17	25	−8	24	Qualification for the relegation round
10	Shakhter Karagandy	22	5	3	14	16	38	−22	18	Qualification for the relegation round
11	Zhetysu	22	4	5	13	17	32	−15	17	Qualification for the relegation round
12	Kaisar	22	3	8	11	12	25	−13	17	Qualification for the relegation round

Source: UEFA.com, Soccerway
Rules for classification: 1) Points; 2) Matches won; 3) Head-to-head points; 4) Head-to-head matches won; 5) Head-to-head goal difference; 6) Head-to-head goals scored; 7) Head-to-head away goals scored; 8) Goal difference; 9) Goals scored; 10) Away goals scored; 11) Draw.

==== Relegation round ====
===== Results summary =====
Overall								Home						Away					
Pld	W	D	L	GF	GA	GD	Pts	W	D	L	GF	GA	GD	W	D	L	GF	GA	GD
10	4	1	5	10	14	−4	13	3	0	2	4	5	−1	1	1	3	6	9	−3

Last updated: 10 November 2015.
Source: Soccerway

===== Results by round =====
Round	1	2	3	4	5	6	7	8	9	10
Ground	A	H	A	H	A	A	H	A	H	H
Result	W	W	L	L	L	L	L	D	W	W
Position	10	9	9	9	10	10	11	11	11	11

Source: Soccerway
A = Away; H = Home; W = Win; D = Draw; L = Loss

===== Results =====
16 August 2015 23	Tobol	1 – 3	Zhetysu	Kostanay
19:00 (UTC+6)	Zyankovich 15' (pen.); Kurgulin (yellow card) 23'; Klimavičius (yellow card) 35'	Summary	Galiakberov 3', 72'; Turysbek 17'	Stadium: Central Stadium; Attendance: 3,000; Referee: Viktor Antonov

23 August 2015 24	Zhetysu	1 – 0	Taraz	Taldykorgan
17:00 (UTC+6)	Turysbek (yellow card) 19'; Samigullin (yellow card) 21'; Savić 67'; A.Pasechenko (yellow card) 90+3'	Summary	S.Zhumahanov (yellow card) 70'; Gatagov (yellow card) 77'; Pyschur (yellow card) 89'; Mukhutdinov (yellow card) 90'	Stadium: Zhetysu Stadium; Attendance: 2,500; Referee: Aleksandr Aliyev

13 September 2015 3	Shakhter Karagandy	3 – 1	Zhetysu	Karaganda
17:00 (UTC+6)	Đidić 34'; Topčagić 81' (pen.); Feshchuk 84'	Summary	S.Sagyndykov (yellow card) 16'; Savić 23'	Stadium: Shakhter Stadium; Attendance: 1,800; Referee: Ruslan Duzmambetov

19 September 2015 26	Zhetysu	0 – 3	Okzhetpes	Taldykorgan
17:00 (UTC+6)	Samigullin (yellow card) 35'; Savić (yellow card) 53'	Summary	A.Kuksin (yellow card) 23'; Chyzhov (yellow card) 30'; Buleshev 40'; Rotković 76', 90+1'	Stadium: Zhetysu Stadium; Attendance: 2,000; Referee: Furkat Atajanow

27 September 2015 27	Kaisar	3 – 1	Zhetysu	Kyzylorda
17:00 (UTC+6)	Klein 10'; Z.Moldakaraev 58' (yellow card) 78'; I.Kalinin 70'	Summary	S.Sagyndykov (yellow card) 73'; Gerasimov (yellow card) 78'; Turysbek 90+3'	Stadium: Gani Muratbayev Stadium; Attendance: 3,000; Referee: Bolat Karlibayev

3 October 2015 28	Taraz	1 – 0	Zhetysu	Taraz
16:00 (UTC+6)	Mukhutdinov 3' (yellow card) 71'; Sergienko (yellow card) 30'; M.Amirkhanov (yellow card) 89'	Summary	Turysbek (yellow card) 7'; Galiakberov (yellow card) 23'	Stadium: Central Stadium; Attendance: 1,500; Referee: Denis Tevyashov

18 October 2015 29	Zhetysu	0 – 1	Shakhter Karagandy	Taldykorgan
16:00 (UTC+6)	T.Adilkhanov (yellow card) 26'; Turysbek (yellow card) 45'	Summary	D.Ubbink (yellow card) 26'; Karpovich 78'	Stadium: Zhetysu Stadium; Attendance: 1,000; Referee: Marat Iskakov

24 October 2015 30	Okzhetpes	1 – 1	Zhetysu	Kokshetau
14:00 (UTC+6)	Sychev 32'; A.Kuksin (yellow card) 89'	Summary	Savić 44'; Shakhmetov (yellow card) 60'	Stadium: Okzhetpes Stadium; Attendance: 1,500; Referee: Askhat Abdanbayev

31 October 2015 31	Zhetysu	2 – 1	Kaisar	Taldykorgan
15:00 (UTC+6)	S.Sagyndykov (yellow card) 21'; Turysbek (yellow card) 64'; E.Guliev 79'; Ergashev (red card) 90+4'; Savić 90+5'	Summary	A.Baltaev 13'; R.Rozybakiev (yellow card) 32'; Matsveenka (yellow card) 52'; Irismetov (yellow card) 64' (red card) 90+4'	Stadium: Zhetysu Stadium; Attendance: 2,000; Referee: Aydin Rakhimbayev

8 November 2015 32	Zhetysu	2 – 0	Tobol	Taldykorgan
15:00 (UTC+6)	Turysbek (yellow card) 40'; Savić 57', 59'; S.Sariyev (yellow card) 89'	Summary	R.Aslan (yellow card) 7'; O.Nedashkovsky (yellow card) 17'	Stadium: Zhetysu Stadium; Attendance: 1,000; Referee: Aleksandr Gauzer

===== League table =====
Pos	Team	Pld	W	D	L	GF	GA	GD	Pts	Relegation
7	Tobol	32	12	6	14	32	42	−10	30	
8	Okzhetpes	32	12	6	14	36	41	−5	29	
9	Taraz	32	10	8	14	25	33	−8	26	
10	Shakhter Karagandy	32	9	5	18	27	47	−20	23	
11	Zhetysu (O)	32	8	6	18	28	46	−18	22	Qualification for the relegation play-off
12	Kaisar (R)	32	4	12	16	20	36	−16	16	Relegation to the Kazakhstan First Division

Source: Soccerway
Rules for classification: 1) Points; 2) Matches won; 3) Head-to-head points; 4) Head-to-head matches won; 5) Head-to-head goal difference; 6) Head-to-head goals scored; 7) Head-to-head away goals scored; 8) Goal difference; 9) Goals scored; 10) Away goals scored; 11) Draw.
(O) Play-off winners; (R) Relegated

==== Relegation play-off ====
14 November 2015	Zhetysu	1 – 0	Vostok	Astana
15:00 (UTC+6)	Shakhmetov (yellow card) 23' (goal) 31'; Savić (yellow card) 78'; E.Guliev (yellow card) 84'	Summary	I.Shevchenko (yellow card) 7'	Stadium: Astana Arena; Attendance: 1,000; Referee: Igor Aleshin

=== Kazakhstan Cup ===
29 April 2015 Second Round	Atyrau	0 – 1	Zhetysu	Atyrau
18:00 (UTC+6)	A.Marov (yellow card) 69'; Diakate (yellow card) 88'; Essame (yellow card) 88'	[ Summary]	Savić (yellow card) 77'; Turysbek 79'	Stadium: Munaishy Stadium; Attendance: 4,000; Referee: Denis Tevyashov

20 May 2015 Quarter Final	Tobol	2 – 0	Zhetysu	Kostanay
18:00 (UTC+6)	Šimkovič 6'; A.Deli 83'	Summary	Savić (yellow card) 35'; S.Sagyndykov (yellow card) 74'	Stadium: Central Stadium; Attendance: 2,000; Referee: Askhat Abdanbayev

== Squad statistics ==
As of Match played 14 November 2015

=== Appearances and goals ===
No.	Pos	Nat	Player	Total		Premier League		Kazakhstan Cup		Relegation play-off	
No.	Pos	Nat	Player	Apps	Goals	Apps	Goals	Apps	Goals	Apps	Goals
1	GK	(Kazakhstan) KAZ	Andrey Shabanov	21	0	19	0	1	0	1	0
2	DF	(Kazakhstan) KAZ	Temirlan Adilkhanov	30	0	21+6	0	2	0	1	0
4	DF	(Tajikistan) TJK	Davron Ergashev	18	0	18	0	0	0	0	0
5	MF	(Kazakhstan) KAZ	Marat Shakhmetov	31	0	21+8	0	0+1	0	1	0
6	MF	(Russia) RUS	Mikhail Petrolay	9	0	5+3	0	0	0	0+1	0
7	MF	(Kazakhstan) KAZ	Sayat Sariyev	21	0	12+8	0	0	0	0+1	0
8	DF	(Kazakhstan) KAZ	Serik Sagyndykov	29	0	23+3	0	2	0	1	0
9	FW	(Kazakhstan) KAZ	Bauyrzhan Turysbek	29	5	19+7	4	2	1	1	0
10	FW	(North Macedonia) MKD	Dušan Savić	35	12	32	12	2	0	1	0
11	MF	(Kazakhstan) KAZ	Marlan Muzhikov	9	0	2+6	0	0+1	0	0	0
13	DF	(Kazakhstan) KAZ	Ilyas Amirseitov	20	0	13+5	0	1	0	1	0
14	DF	(Kazakhstan) KAZ	Yevgeni Goryachi	11	0	10	0	0	0	1	0
15	MF	(Kazakhstan) KAZ	Ruslan Barzukayev	3	0	1+2	0	0	0	0	0
17	MF	(Kazakhstan) KAZ	Dias Mynbaev	4	0	2+2	0	0	0	0	0
18	MF	(Kazakhstan) KAZ	Maksim Azovskiy	31	0	23+6	0	2	0	0	0
19	MF	(Uzbekistan) UZB	Bobir Davlatov	10	0	7+2	0	0	0	1	0
20	GK	(Kazakhstan) KAZ	Andrey Pasechenko	15	0	13+1	0	1	0	0	0
21	FW	(Azerbaijan) AZE	Elbeyi Guliyev	7	1	1+5	1	0	0	0+1	0
23	FW	(Russia) RUS	Ruslan Galiakberov	14	6	13	6	0	0	1	0
25	MF	(Kazakhstan) KAZ	Zhaksylyk Seydakhmetov	5	0	1+4	0	0	0	0	0
46	FW	(Kazakhstan) KAZ	Sanzhar Sapiyanov	3	0	0+3	0	0	0	0	0
88	DF	(Russia) RUS	Aleksei Gerasimov	10	0	8+1	0	0	0	1	0
91	MF	(Russia) RUS	Ilsur Samigullin	10	0	10	0	0	0	0	0
Players away from Zhetysu on loan:
Players who appeared for Zhetysu that left during the season:
3	MF	(Lithuania) LTU	Gediminas Vičius	9	0	4+4	0	1	0	0	0
6	MF	(Kazakhstan) KAZ	Denis Rodionov	5	0	3+1	0	1	0	0	0
14	DF	(Kazakhstan) KAZ	Aleksandr Kirov	16	0	13+1	0	2	0	0	0
19	MF	(Kazakhstan) KAZ	Rinat Khairullin	15	0	8+5	0	1+1	0	0	0
21	DF	(Serbia) SRB	Miloš Mihajlov	21	0	19	0	2	0	0	0
23	DF	(Kazakhstan) KAZ	Ashat Mynbaev	1	0	0+1	0	0	0	0	0
31	MF	(Serbia) SRB	Ivan Cvetković	16	0	14	0	1+1	0	0	0
89	FW	(Serbia) SRB	Djordje Despotović	20	5	17+1	5	2	0	0	0

=== Goal scorers ===
Place	Position	Nation	Number	Name	Premier League	Kazakhstan Cup	Relegation play-off	Total
1	FW	(North Macedonia)	10	Dušan Savić	12	0	0	12
2	FW	(Russia)	23	Ruslan Galiakberov	6	0	0	6
3	FW	(Serbia)	89	Djordje Despotović	5	0	0	5
3	FW	(Kazakhstan)	9	Bauyrzhan Turysbek	4	1	0	5
5	FW	(Azerbaijan)	21	Elbeyi Guliyev	1	0	0	1
5	MF	(Kazakhstan)	5	Marat Shakhmetov	0	0	1	1
				TOTALS	28	1	1	30

=== Disciplinary record ===
Number	Nation	Position	Name	Premier League		Kazakhstan Cup		Relegation play-off		Total	
Number	Nation	Position	Name	Yellow card	Red card	Yellow card	Red card	Yellow card	Red card	Yellow card	Red card
2	(Kazakhstan)	DF	Temirlan Adilkhanov	2	0	0	0	0	0	2	0
3	(Lithuania)	MF	Gediminas Vičius	1	0	0	0	0	0	1	0
4	(Tajikistan)	DF	Davron Ergashev	7	1	0	0	0	0	7	1
5	(Kazakhstan)	MF	Marat Shakhmetov	3	0	0	0	1	0	4	0
7	(Kazakhstan)	MF	Sayat Sariyev	3	0	0	0	0	0	3	0
8	(Kazakhstan)	DF	Serik Sagyndykov	10	0	1	0	0	0	11	0
9	(Kazakhstan)	FW	Bauyrzhan Turysbek	8	1	0	0	0	0	8	1
10	(North Macedonia)	FW	Dušan Savić	3	0	2	0	1	0	6	0
18	(Kazakhstan)	MF	Maksim Azovskiy	1	0	0	0	0	0	1	0
20	(Kazakhstan)	GK	Andrey Pasechenko	3	0	0	0	0	0	3	0
21	(Azerbaijan)	FW	Elbeyi Guliyev	0	0	0	0	1	0	1	0
23	(Russia)	FW	Ruslan Galiakberov	1	0	0	0	0	0	1	0
31	(Serbia)	MF	Ivan Cvetković	3	1	0	0	0	0	3	1
88	(Russia)	DF	Aleksei Gerasimov	1	0	0	0	0	0	1	0
89	(Serbia)	FW	Djordje Despotović	4	0	0	0	0	0	4	0
91	(Russia)	MF	Ilsur Samigullin	2	0	0	0	0	0	2	0
			TOTALS	52	3	3	0	3	0	58	3

== Notes ==
- Atyrau were awarded the victory after Zhetysu fielded to many foreign players.
