= 2015 Kazakhstan Premier League =

Kazakhstan Premier League
- Season: 2015
- Champions: Astana (2nd title)
- Relegated: Kaisar
- Champions League: Astana
- Europa League: Kairat; Aktobe; Ordabasy
- Matches: 192
- Goals: 418 (2.18 per match)
- Top goalscorer: Gerard Gohou (22)
- Biggest home win: Kairat 4–0 Tobol; Kairat 4–0 Shakhter; Astana 4–0 Tobol
- Biggest away win: Shakhter 0–5 Kairat
- Highest scoring: Astana 4–3 Kairat; Kairat 5–2 Irtysh

The 2015 Kazakhstan Premier League is the 24th season of the Kazakhstan Premier League, the highest football league competition in Kazakhstan. The season began in March 2015 and finished in November. Astana were the defending champions having won their first league championship the previous year.

== Teams ==
Spartak Semey was relegated at the end of the 2014 season, and were replaced by Okzhetpes.

=== Team overview ===
Locations of teams in the 2015 Kazakhstan Premier League

Team	Location	Venue	Capacity
Aktobe	Aktobe	Aktobe Central Stadium	15,000
Astana	Astana	Astana Arena	30,000
Atyrau	Atyrau	Munaishy Stadium	8,690
Irtysh	Pavlodar	Pavlodar Central Stadium	15,000
Kairat	Almaty	Almaty Central Stadium	25,057
Kaisar	Kyzylorda	Gany Muratbayev Stadium	7,500
Okzhetpes	Kokshetau	Okzhetpes Stadium	4,158
Ordabasy	Shymkent	Kazhimukan Munaitpasov Stadium	35,000
Shakhter	Karagandy	Shakhter Stadium	20,000
Taraz	Taraz	Taraz Central Stadium	11,525
Tobol	Kostanay	Kostanay Central Stadium	10,500
Zhetysu	Taldykorgan	Zhetysu Stadium	4,000

=== Personnel and kits ===
Note: Flags indicate national team as has been defined under FIFA eligibility rules. Players and Managers may hold more than one non-FIFA nationality.

Team	Manager	Captain	Kit manufacturer	Shirt sponsor
Aktobe	(Romania) Ioan Andone	(Kazakhstan) Yuriy Logvinenko	Adidas	—
Astana	(Bulgaria) Stanimir Stoilov	(Kazakhstan) Tanat Nusserbayev	Adidas	Samruk-Kazyna
Atyrau	(Kazakhstan) Vladimir Nikitenko	(Cameroon) Guy Essame	Nike	—
Irtysh	(Bulgaria) Dimitar Dimitrov	(Kazakhstan) Samat Smakov	Nike	ENRC
Kairat	(Slovakia) Vladimír Weiss	(Kazakhstan) Bauyrzhan Islamkhan	Nike	KazRosGaz
Kaisar	(Russia) Fyodor Shcherbachenko	(Czech Republic) Martin Klein	Nike	—
Okzhetpes	(Russia) Vladimir Mukhanov	(Kazakhstan) Alibek Buleshev	Adidas	—
Ordabasy	(Russia) Viktor Kumykov	(Kazakhstan) Kairat Ashirbekov	Adidas	TAU
Shakhter	(Ukraine) Ihor Zakharyak	(Bosnia and Herzegovina) Aldin Đidić	Adidas	—
Taraz	(Ukraine) Evgeny Yarovenko	(Kazakhstan) Dmitri Yevstigneyev	Nike	—
Tobol	(Kazakhstan) Sergey Maslenov	(Kazakhstan) Nurbol Zhumaskaliyev	Joma	—
Zhetysu	(Kazakhstan) Ivan Azovskiy	(Kazakhstan) Andrey Pasechenko	Puma	—

=== Foreign players ===
The number of foreign players is restricted to eight per KPL team. A team can use only five foreign players on the field in each game.

Club	Player 1	Player 2	Player 3	Player 4	Player 5	Player 6	Player 7	Player 8
Aktobe	(Romania) **Ciprian Deac**	(Armenia) **Marcos Pizzelli**	(Brazil) Danilo Neco	(Brazil) Anderson Mineiro	(Brazil) Danilo	(Lithuania) **Artūras Žulpa**	(Nigeria) **Dele Adeleye**	
Astana	(Bosnia and Herzegovina) Marin Aničić	(Colombia) Roger Cañas	(Ghana) **Patrick Twumasi**	(Central African Republic) **Foxi Kéthévoama**	(Slovenia) **Branko Ilić**	(Serbia) Nemanja Maksimović	(Ukraine) **Denys Dedechko**	(Democratic Republic of the Congo) **Junior Kabananga**
Atyrau	(Nigeria) **Michael Odibe**	(Russia) Anton Grigoryev	(Ukraine) Ruslan Fomin	(Cameroon) **Guy Essame**	(Ukraine) Volodymyr Arzhanov	(Senegal) Abdoulaye Diakate	(Belarus) Dmitri Parkhachev	(Montenegro) Ivan Ivanović
Irtysh	(France) Alassane N'Diaye	(Ukraine) Kostyantyn Dudchenko	(Czech Republic) Tomáš Jirsák	(Portugal) Carlos Fonseca	(Central African Republic) **Fernander Kassaï**	(Brazil) Evandro Roncatto	(Brazil) Ferreira	(The Gambia) **Mustapha Jarju**
Kairat	(Serbia) Žarko Marković	(Spain) Sito Riera	(Brazil) Isael	(Ivory Coast) Gerard Gohou	(Ukraine) **Anatoliy Tymoshchuk**	(Serbia) Djordje Despotović	(Brazil) Serginho	(Brazil) Bruno Soares
Kaisar	(Czech Republic) **Martin Klein**	(Estonia) **Rimo Hunt**	(Russia) Sergei Strukov	(Serbia) Vuk Mitošević	(Croatia) Josip Knežević	(Belarus) Anton Matsveenka	(Bulgaria) Georgi Karaneychev	
Okzhetpes	(Belarus) **Alyaksandr Pawlaw**	(Russia) Vitali Volkov	(Russia) Daniil Chertov	(Ukraine) Oleksandr Chyzhov	(Czech Republic) Michal Smejkal	(Montenegro) Luka Rotković	(Serbia) Ivan Cvetković	(Russia) **Dmitry Sychev**
Ordabasy	(Ukraine) Artem Kasyanov	(Serbia) **Branislav Trajković**	(Ukraine) Kyrylo Petrov	(Croatia) Ivan Božić	(Uzbekistan) **Alexander Geynrikh**	(Serbia) Aleksandar Simčević	(Croatia) Edin Junuzović	
Shakhter	(Bosnia and Herzegovina) **Nikola Vasiljević**	(Austria) Mihret Topcagić	(Czech Republic) Jan Vošahlík	(Brazil) Pedro Sass	(Trinidad and Tobago) **Aubrey David**	(Netherlands) Desley Ubbink	(Ukraine) Maksym Feshchuk	(Bulgaria) Plamen Dimov
Taraz	(Serbia) Jovan Golić	(Ukraine) Denys Vasilyev	(Ukraine) Oleksandr Yarovenko	(Ukraine) Dmytro Bashlay	(Romania) Ioan Mera	(Ukraine) Oleksandr Pyschur	(Nigeria) **Izu Azuka**	(Russia) Alan Gatagov
Tobol	(Ukraine) Serhiy Yavorskyi	(Serbia) Nenad Šljivić	(Serbia) Ognjen Krasić	(Nigeria) **Uche Kalu**	(Austria) Tomáš Šimkovič	(Lithuania) **Arūnas Klimavičius**	(Lithuania) **Deivydas Matulevičius**	
Zhetysu	(Tajikistan) **Davron Ergashev**	(North Macedonia) **Dušan Savić**	(Russia) Ruslan Galiakberov	(Russia) Ilsur Samigullin	(Russia) Aleksei Gerasimov	(Azerbaijan) Elbeyi Guliyev	(Uzbekistan) Bobir Davlatov	(Russia) Mikhail Petrolay

In bold: Players that have been capped for their national team.

=== Managerial changes ===
Team	Outgoing manager	Manner of departure	Date of vacancy	Position in table	Incoming manager	Date of appointment
Tobol	(Armenia) Vardan Minasyan	Sacked	16 April 2015	8th	(Kazakhstan) Sergei Maslenov (caretaker)	16 April 2015
Zhetysu	(Kazakhstan) Askar Kozhabergenov	Resigned	20 April 2015	12th	(Kazakhstan) Ivan Azovskiy (caretaker)	20 April 2015
Shakhter	(Kazakhstan) Vladimir Cheburin	Resigned	6 May 2015	12th	(Kazakhstan) Yevgeni Sveshnikov (caretaker)	8 May 2015
Irtysh	(Russia) Dmitri Cheryshev	Sacked	8 May 2015	10th	(Kazakhstan) Sergey Klimov (caretaker)	8 May 2015
Zhetysu	(Kazakhstan) Ivan Azovskiy (caretaker)	End of caretaker role	28 May 2015	12th	(Kazakhstan) Ivan Azovskiy	28 May 2015
Irtysh	(Kazakhstan) Sergey Klimov (caretaker)	End of caretaker role	1 June 2015	10th	(Bulgaria) Dimitar Dimitrov	1 June 2015
Shakhter	(Kazakhstan) Yevgeni Sveshnikov (caretaker)	End of caretaker role	5 June 2015	12th	(Ukraine) Ihor Zakharyak (caretaker)	5 June 2015
Aktobe	(Russia) Vladimir Gazzayev		20 July 2015	1st	(Romania) Ioan Andone	20 July 2015
Kaisar	(Kazakhstan) Dmitriy Ogai	Resigned	23 July 2015	12th	(Russia) Fyodor Shcherbachenko	06 August 2015

== Regular season ==
In the regular season twelve teams played each other home-and-away in a round-robin format for a total of 22 matches per team. The top six teams advanced to the Championship round and the bottom six teams qualified for the Relegation round.

=== Regular season table ===
Pos	Team	Pld	W	D	L	GF	GA	GD	Pts	Qualification
1	Kairat	22	13	5	4	43	14	+29	44	Qualification for the championship round
2	Aktobe	22	12	8	2	27	12	+15	44	Qualification for the championship round
3	Astana	22	12	7	3	40	19	+21	43	Qualification for the championship round
4	Atyrau	22	9	10	3	25	19	+6	37	Qualification for the championship round
5	Ordabasy	22	9	8	5	21	18	+3	35	Qualification for the championship round
6	Irtysh Pavlodar	22	7	9	6	26	23	+3	30	Qualification for the championship round
7	Okzhetpes	22	8	2	12	24	33	−9	26	Qualification for the relegation round
8	Tobol	22	7	4	11	22	32	−10	25	Qualification for the relegation round
9	Taraz	22	7	3	12	17	25	−8	24	Qualification for the relegation round
10	Shakhter Karagandy	22	5	3	14	16	38	−22	18	Qualification for the relegation round
11	Zhetysu	22	4	5	13	17	32	−15	17	Qualification for the relegation round
12	Kaisar	22	3	8	11	12	25	−13	17	Qualification for the relegation round

Source: UEFA.com, Soccerway
Rules for classification: 1) Points; 2) Matches won; 3) Head-to-head points; 4) Head-to-head matches won; 5) Head-to-head goal difference; 6) Head-to-head goals scored; 7) Head-to-head away goals scored; 8) Goal difference; 9) Goals scored; 10) Away goals scored; 11) Draw.

=== Regular season results ===
Home \ Away	AKT	AST	ATY	IRT	KRT	KSR	OKZ	ORD	SHA	TAR	TOB	ZHE
Aktobe		0–0	1–1	2–1	0–0	0–0	4–2	0–0	0–1	3–1	2–1	2–0
Astana	0–0		0–0	2–2	4–3	2–0	2–0	1–1	2–1	4–1	4–0	2–1
Atyrau	0–2	1–1		0–0	0–0	2–1	2–1	1–1	1–0	2–1	1–2	3–0
Irtysh Pavlodar	1–0	0–3	1–2		1–1	4–2	3–1	2–0	3–1	0–1	1–1	1–0
Kairat	1–2	2–0	0–1	1–0		1–0	4–0	2–1	4–0	2–0	4–0	2–0
Kaisar	0–0	2–1	0–0	0–0	0–0		0–2	1–1	2–0	1–3	0–1	0–0
Okzhetpes	2–3	1–2	2–2	0–1	1–3	1–0		0–1	1–0	2–0	1–0	2–0
Ordabasy	0–1	0–2	2–0	1–1	2–2	0–0	2–1		1–0	1–0	2–0	0–0
Shakhter Karagandy	0–1	0–4	1–1	2–2	0–5	1–2	3–0	0–1		2–0	1–0	2–1
Taraz	0–1	2–0	0–1	0–0	1–0	3–0	1–1	0–1	0–0		1–0	2–0
Tobol	0–2	1–1	2–2	1–0	1–3	1–0	0–2	1–3	4–1	3–0		3–1
Zhetysu	1–1	1–3	1–2	2–2	0–3	2–1	0–1	3–0	3–0	1–0	0–0	

Source: Soccerway
Legend: Blue = home team win; Yellow = draw; Red = away team win.

== Championship round ==
The top six teams from Regular season will participate in the Championship round where they will play each other home-and-away in a round-robin format for a total of 10 matches per team. They will start this round with their points from Regular season halved, rounded upwards, and they will keep their Regular season record (matches won, draws, losses and goal differential). After completion of the Championship round the winners will be the Champions of 2015 Kazakhstan Premier League and qualify for 2016–17 UEFA Champions League second qualifying round. The runners-up and third-placed team will qualify for Europa League first qualifying round and the fourth placed team may also qualify for Europa League if they or one of the top three teams wins the 2015 Kazakhstan Cup.

=== Championship round table ===
Pos	Team	Pld	W	D	L	GF	GA	GD	Pts	Qualification
1	Astana (C)	32	20	7	5	55	26	+29	46	Qualification for the Champions League second qualifying round
2	Kairat	32	20	7	5	60	19	+41	45	Qualification for the Europa League first qualifying round (Note: Kairat qualified for the UEFA Europa League first qualifying round by winning the 2015 Kazakhstan Cup.)
3	Aktobe	32	15	9	8	35	25	+10	32	Qualification for the Europa League first qualifying round
4	Ordabasy	32	12	10	10	32	31	+1	29	Qualification for the Europa League first qualifying round
5	Atyrau	32	11	12	9	31	33	−2	27	
6	Irtysh Pavlodar	32	10	10	12	37	39	−2	25	

Source: Soccerway
Rules for classification: 1) Points; 2) Play-off (only if deciding champion when two teams are tied); 3) Matches won; 4) Head-to-head points; 5) Head-to-head matches won; 6) Head-to-head goal difference; 7) Head-to-head goals scored; 8) Head-to-head away goals scored; 9) Goal difference; 10) Goals scored; 11) Away goals scored; 12) Play-off (only if deciding champion when three or teams are tied); 13) Draw.
(C) Champions

=== Championship round results ===
Home \ Away	AKT	AST	ATY	IRT	KRT	ORD
Aktobe		0–1	1–0	3–2	0–3	1–0
Astana	1–0		4–1	1–0	0–1	2–1
Atyrau	1–1	0–1		1–0	1–2	1–3
Irtysh Pavlodar	1–0	2–1	2–0		0–2	1–2
Kairat	2–1	0–1	0–0	5–2		2–0
Ordabasy	2–1	2–3	0–1	1–1	0–0	

Source: Soccerway
Legend: Blue = home team win; Yellow = draw; Red = away team win.

== Relegation round ==
The bottom six teams from Regular season will participate in the Relegation round where they will play each other home-and-away in a round-robin format for a total of 10 matches per team. They will start this round with their points from Regular season halved, rounded upwards, and they will keep their Regular season record (matches won, draws, losses and goal differential). After completion of the Relegation round the winners will be considered 7th-placed team of 2015 Kazakhstan Premier League, the runners-up will be 8th and so on, with the last team being 12th. The 11th-placed team will qualify for Relegation play-off against runners-up of 2015 Kazakhstan First Division, with the loser being eliminated, and the 12th-placed team will be directly relegated to 2016 Kazakhstan First Division as the last-placed team.

=== Relegation round table ===
Pos	Team	Pld	W	D	L	GF	GA	GD	Pts	Relegation
7	Tobol	32	12	6	14	32	42	−10	30	
8	Okzhetpes	32	12	6	14	36	41	−5	29	
9	Taraz	32	10	8	14	25	33	−8	26	
10	Shakhter Karagandy	32	9	5	18	27	47	−20	23	
11	Zhetysu (O)	32	8	6	18	28	46	−18	22	Qualification for the relegation play-off
12	Kaisar (R)	32	4	12	16	20	36	−16	16	Relegation to the Kazakhstan First Division

Source: Soccerway
Rules for classification: 1) Points; 2) Matches won; 3) Head-to-head points; 4) Head-to-head matches won; 5) Head-to-head goal difference; 6) Head-to-head goals scored; 7) Head-to-head away goals scored; 8) Goal difference; 9) Goals scored; 10) Away goals scored; 11) Draw.
(O) Play-off winners; (R) Relegated

=== Relegation round results ===
Home \ Away	KSR	OKZ	SHA	TAR	TOB	ZHE
Kaisar		0–1	0–1	0–0	1–2	3–1
Okzhetpes	2–1		1–0	0–0	1–2	1–1
Shakhter Karagandy	1–1	0–0		3–0	1–2	3–1
Taraz	1–1	3–3	2–0		1–0	1–0
Tobol	0–0	1–0	2–1	0–0		1–3
Zhetysu	2–1	0–3	0–1	1–0	2–0	

Source: Soccerway
Legend: Blue = home team win; Yellow = draw; Red = away team win.

== Relegation play-offs ==
14 November 2015	Zhetysu	1–0	Vostok	Astana
15:00 (UTC+6)	Shakhmetov 31'	Summary		Stadium: Astana Arena; Attendance: 1,000; Referee: Igor Aleshin

== Statistics ==
=== Top scorers ===
As of matches played by 8 November 2015

Rank	Player	Club	Goals
1	(Ivory Coast) Gerard Gohou	Kairat	22
2	(Montenegro) Luka Rotković	Okzhetpes	13
2	(Serbia) Đorđe Despotović	Zhetysu/Kairat	13
4	(North Macedonia) Dušan Savić	Zhetysu	12
5	(Kazakhstan) Tanat Nusserbayev	Astana	11
6	(Kazakhstan) Sergei Khizhnichenko	Aktobe	9
6	(Ukraine) Oleksandr Pyschur	Taraz	9
8	(Ukraine) Kostyantyn Dudchenko	Irtysh	8
8	(Colombia) Roger Cañas	Astana	8
8	(Kazakhstan) Alibek Buleshev	Okzhetpes	8
8	(Croatia) Edin Junuzović	Kaisar/Ordabasy	8

=== Hat-tricks ===
Player	For	Against	Result	Date
(Ivory Coast) Gerard Gohou	Kairat	Tobol	4–0	7 March 2015
(Kazakhstan) Nurbol Zhumaskaliyev	Tobol	Shakhter Karagandy	4–1	5 April 2015
(Nigeria) Uche Kalu	Tobol	Zhetysu	3–1	16 May 2015
(Ukraine) Kostyantyn Dudchenko	Irtysh	Kaisar	4–2	24 May 2015
(Ivory Coast) Gerard Gohou	Kairat	Okzhetpes	3–1	6 June 2015
(Kazakhstan) Sergei Khizhnichenko	Aktobe	Okzhetpes	4–2	5 July 2015

=== Scoring ===
- First goal of the season: Ivan Božić for Ordabasy against Irtysh (7 March 2015)
- Fastest goal of the season: 2nd minute,
  - Grigori Sartakov for Irtysh against Tobol (21 March 2015)
- Latest goal of the season: 94th minute,
  - Gerard Gohou for Kairat against Tobol (7 March 2015)

== Awards ==
=== Annual awards ===
Award	Winner	Club
Premier League Player of the Year	(Ivory Coast) Gerard Gohou	Kairat
Premier League Goalkeeper of the Year	(Kazakhstan) Stas Pokatilov	Aktobe
Premier League Manager of the Year	(Bulgaria) Stanimir Stoilov	Astana
Premier League Top Scorer	(Ivory Coast) Gerard Gohou	Kairat

=== Team of the Year ===
The Kazakhstan Premier League Team of the Year for 2015 was a symbolic selection of 22 players compiled by the Professional Football League of Kazakhstan following a survey of the league's club head coaches.

Goalkeepers	Defenders	Midfielders	Forwards
(Kazakhstan) Stas Pokatilov (Kazakhstan) Nenad Erić	(Kazakhstan) Dmitry Shomko (Kazakhstan) Gafurzhan Suyumbayev (Kazakhstan) Yermek Kuantayev (Kazakhstan) Abzal Beysebekov (Bosnia and Herzegovina) Marin Aničić (Kazakhstan) Yuri Logvinenko (Serbia) Žarko Marković (Kazakhstan) Yevgeny Postnikov	(Colombia) Roger Cañas (Kazakhstan) Mikhail Bakayev (Kazakhstan) Bauyrzhan Islamkhan (Armenia) Marcos Pizzelli (Kazakhstan) Baurzhan Dzholchiyev (Portugal) Carlos Fonseca (Brazil) Isael (Kazakhstan) Azat Nurgaliyev	(Ivory Coast) Gerard Gohou (Kazakhstan) Tanat Nusserbayev (Ukraine) Konstantin Dudchenko (Serbia) Đorđe Despotović

== Attendances ==
#	Club	Average
1	Kairat	8,675
2	Aktobe	5,300
3	Atyrau	4,172
4	Astana	3,894
5	Irtysh	3,550
6	Taraz	3,344
7	Ordabasy	3,144
8	Tobol	2,656
9	Kaysar	2,563
10	Shakhter	2,131
11	Zhetysu	1,844
12	Okzhetpes	1,681
