= 2021–22 FC Arsenal Tula season =

Arsenal Tula
2021–22 season
- Owner: Rostec (Tulamashzavod)
- General director: Guram Adzhoyev
- Head coach: Dmytro Parfenov
- Stadium: Arsenal Stadium
- Premier League: 16th (Relegated)
- Russian Cup: Round of 16 vs Alania Vladikavkaz
- Top goalscorer: League: Three Players (4); All: Two Players (5)
- Highest home attendance: 5,246 vs Dynamo Moscow (12 March 2022)
- Lowest home attendance: 0 vs Sochi (31 October 2021)
- Average home league attendance: 3,367 (21 May 2022)
Home colours	Away colours
- All statistics correct as of 14 May 2022.

The 2021–22 season was the 64th season in the existence of FC Arsenal Tula, the club's 19th and final consecutive season in the topflight of Russian football. In addition to the domestic league, FC Arsenal Tula participated in this season's editions of the Russian Cup. They were eliminated in the round of 16.

== Squad ==
Note: Flags indicate national team as defined under FIFA eligibility rules; some limited exceptions apply. Players may hold more than one non-FIFA nationality.

No.	Pos.	Nation	Player
1	GK	KGZ	Anton Kochenkov
3	DF	RUS	Artyom Sokol
4	DF	SRB	Uroš Radaković
5	DF	RUS	Taras Burlak
6	DF	RUS	Igor Smolnikov
7	FW	RUS	Yevgeni Markov
8	FW	RUS	Kirill Panchenko
9	MF	RUS	Ayaz Guliyev
10	FW	ZAM	Evans Kangwa
11	MF	RUS	Sergei Tkachyov
20	MF	SRB	Goran Čaušić
21	MF	RUS	Vladislav Panteleyev

No.	Pos.	Nation	Player
23	MF	RUS	Igor Gorbatenko
25	DF	RUS	Danil Stepanov
28	FW	SRB	Đorđe Despotović
36	GK	RUS	Mikhail Levashov
38	DF	RUS	Ilya Kuleshin
44	MF	ZAM	Kings Kangwa
48	FW	RUS	Yevgeni Lutsenko
50	GK	RUS	Yegor Shamov
60	DF	RUS	Maksim Belyayev
70	MF	BUL	Georgi Kostadinov
76	DF	RUS	Artyom Sukhanov
99	DF	RUS	Ivan Novoseltsev

=== Out on loan ===
Note: Flags indicate national team as defined under FIFA eligibility rules; some limited exceptions apply. Players may hold more than one non-FIFA nationality.

No.	Pos.	Nation	Player
—	MF	ZAM	Lameck Banda (at Maccabi Petah Tikva until 30 June 2022)

== Transfers ==
=== In ===
Date	Position	Nationality	Name	From	Fee	Ref.
9 June 2021	FW	(Russia)	Yevgeni Markov	Krasnodar	Undisclosed	
21 June 2021	MF	(Russia)	Ayaz Guliyev	Spartak Moscow	Undisclosed	
2 July 2021	DF	(Russia)	Ivan Novoseltsev	Sochi	Undisclosed	
6 July 2021	DF	(Sweden)	Axel Björnström	IK Sirius	Undisclosed	
20 July 2021	MF	(Georgia (country))	Zuriko Davitashvili	Rubin Kazan	Undisclosed	
23 July 2021	DF	(Russia)	Igor Smolnikov	Krasnodar	Undisclosed	
23 July 2021	DF	(Serbia)	Uroš Radaković	Sparta Prague	Undisclosed	
2 August 2021	GK	(Russia)	Anton Kochenkov	Lokomotiv Moscow	Undisclosed	
7 September 2021	MF	(Russia)	Ruslan Kambolov	Krasnodar	Undisclosed	
29 December 2021	MF	(Russia)	Danil Stepanov	Rubin Kazan	Undisclosed	
2 February 2022	FW	(Serbia)	Đorđe Despotović	Rubin Kazan	Undisclosed	

=== Loans in ===
Date from	Position	Nationality	Name	From	Date to	Ref.
29 May 2021	MF	(Russia)	Danil Stepanov	Rubin Kazan	29 December 2021	

=== Out ===
Date	Position	Nationality	Name	To	Fee	Ref.
6 September 2021	DF	(Germany)	Robert Bauer	Sint-Truiden	Undisclosed	
11 December 2021	DF	(Russia)	Aleksandr Denisov	SKA-Khabarovsk	Undisclosed	
1 January 2022	MF	(Russia)	Daniil Khlusevich	Spartak Moscow	Undisclosed	
4 January 2022	FW	(Romania)	Alexandru Tudorie	Sepsi OSK	Undisclosed	
19 February 2022	DF	(Russia)	Aleksandr Dovbnya	Kyzylzhar	Undisclosed	
28 February 2022	MF	(Belarus)	Valery Gromyko	BATE Borisov	Undisclosed	

=== Loans out ===
Date from	Position	Nationality	Name	To	Date to	Ref.
30 June 2021	MF	(Belarus)	Valery Gromyko	BATE Borisov	31 December 2021	
6 August 2021	MF	(Zambia)	Lameck Banda	Maccabi Petah Tikva	End of season	

=== Released ===
Date	Position	Nationality	Name	Joined	Date	Ref.
23 June 2021	GK	(Russia)	Artur Nigmatullin	Nizhny Novgorod	8 July 2021	
31 December 2021	GK	(Russia)	Mikhail Ponomarenko			
31 December 2021	MF	(Russia)	Yegor Kudinov	Shakhtyor Petrikov		
31 December 2021	MF	(Russia)	Aleksandr Zyuzin			
31 December 2021	FW	(Russia)	Daniil Antonov			
31 December 2021	FW	(Russia)	Danila Strelchuk	SKA Rostov-on-Don		
14 January 2022	MF	(Russia)	Ruslan Kambolov	Aktobe	5 March 2022	
9 March 2022	DF	(Sweden)	Axel Björnström	AIK	9 March 2022	
6 April 2022	MF	(Georgia (country))	Zuriko Davitashvili	Dinamo Batumi		

== Friendlies ==
18 January 2022	Arsenal Tula (Russia)	2 – 2	(Hungary) Kisvárda	Belek, Turkey
17:00 MSK (UTC+3)	Smolnikov 26'; K.Sidorenko 74' (pen.)	Report	Khimich 29', 69'	Stadium: Kempinski Hotel Field

21 January 2022	Arsenal Tula (Russia)	1 – 2	(Hungary) Szeged-Csanád	Belek, Turkey
11:00 MSK (UTC+3)	Tkachyov 27'; Kostadinov (yellow card) 40'	Report	Germán 40' (pen.); D.Pejović 89'	Stadium: Kempinski Hotel Field

30 January 2022	Arsenal Tula (Russia)	1 – 1	(Serbia) Novi Pazar	Belek, Turkey
17:00 MSK (UTC+3)	Sokol (yellow card) 5'; K.Kangwa (red card) 44'; Panchenko 60'; Kostadinov (red card) 89'	Report	Aganspahić 6' (pen.)	Stadium: Kempinski Hotel Field

5 February 2022	Arsenal Tula (Russia)	1 – 2	(Denmark) Esbjerg	Belek, Turkey
11:00 MSK (UTC+3)	Panchenko 87'	Report	10'; Holten 24'; (yellow card) 43'; K.Tekiela (yellow card) 74'	Stadium: Kempinski Hotel Field

5 February 2022	Arsenal Tula (Russia)	0 – 0	(Bosnia and Herzegovina) Borac Banja Luka	Belek, Turkey
17:00 MSK (UTC+3)	Kostadinov (yellow card) 25'	Report	(yellow card) 41'	Stadium: Kempinski Hotel Field

12 February 2022	Arsenal Tula (Russia)	3 – 2	(Denmark) Randers	Belek, Turkey
17:00 MSK (UTC+3)	K.Kangwa 50', 60'; Čaušić 85'	Report	Odey 32'; Egho 52'	Stadium: Cornelia Diamond Kempinski Hotel Field

19 February 2022	Arsenal Tula (Russia)	2 – 2	(Latvia) Liepāja	Belek, Turkey
17:00 MSK (UTC+3)	Goal	Report	Goal

== Competitions ==
=== Overview ===
Competition	First match	Last match	Starting round	Final position	Record							
Competition	First match	Last match	Starting round	Final position	Pld	W	D	L	GF	GA	GD	Win %
Premier League	24 July 2021	21 May 2022	Matchday 1	16th	29	5	8	16	29	57	−28	17.24
Russian Cup	22 September 2021	2 March 2022	Group stage	Round of 16	3	1	1	1	7	3	+4	33.33
Total					32	6	9	17	36	60	−24	18.75

Last updated: 14 May 2022
Source: Soccerway

=== Premier League ===
==== League table ====
Pos	Team	Pld	W	D	L	GF	GA	GD	Pts	Qualification or relegation
12	Ural Yekaterinburg	30	8	9	13	27	35	−8	33 (Note: Head-to-head points: Nizhny Novgorod 4, Ural Yekaterinburg 1.)	
13	Khimki (O)	30	7	11	12	34	47	−13	32	Qualification for the relegation play-offs
14	Ufa (R)	30	6	12	12	29	40	−11	30	Qualification for the relegation play-offs
15	Rubin Kazan (R)	30	8	5	17	34	56	−22	29	Relegation to First League
16	Arsenal Tula (R)	30	5	8	17	30	59	−29	23	Relegation to First League

Source: Premier Liga
Rules for classification: 1) Points; 2) Head-to-head points; 3) Head-to-head matches won; 4) Head-to-head goal difference; 5) Head-to-head goals scored; 6) Matches won; 7) Goal difference; 8) Goals scored; 9) 2020–21 position (not applicable to final standings); 10) Play-off.
(O) Play-off winners; (R) Relegated

==== Results summary ====
Overall								Home						Away					
Pld	W	D	L	GF	GA	GD	Pts	W	D	L	GF	GA	GD	W	D	L	GF	GA	GD
30	5	8	17	30	59	−29	23	3	7	5	17	22	−5	2	1	12	13	37	−24

Last updated: 21 May 2022.
Source: FBref

==== Results by round ====
Round	1	2	3	4	5	6	7	8	9	10	11	12	13	14	15	16	17	18	19	20	21	22	23	24	25	26	27	28	29	30
Ground	A	H	H	A	H	A	H	A	A	H	H	A	Н	Н	A	H	А	A	A	A	H	A	H	A	H	A	H	H	A	H
Result	L	L	W	L	D	L	D	W	L	D	W	L	L	D	L	W	W	L	L	D	L	L	D	L	L	L	D	D	L	L
Position	13	16	12	13	13	15	15	13	13	14	12	13	14	14	14	12	11	12	13	12	14	14	15	16	16	16	16	16	16	16

Updated to match(es) played on 21 May 2022. Source: Premier Liga
A = Away; H = Home; W = Win; D = Draw; L = Loss

==== Matches ====
24 July 2021 1	Lokomotiv Moscow	3 – 1	Arsenal Tula	Moscow
20:00 MSK (UTC+3)	Kamano (yellow card) 45+1'; Zhemaletdinov 80', 86'; Smolov 89'	Report	Tkachyov 22'; Markov (yellow card) 57'; Sokol (yellow card) 36' (yellow-red card) 79'	Stadium: RZD Arena; Attendance: 0 Referee: Igor Panin

30 July 2021 2	Arsenal Tula	0 – 3	Rubin Kazan	Tula
19:00 MSK (UTC+3)	Kostadinov (yellow card) 33'; Smolnikov (yellow card) 53'	Report	Hwang 12'; Begić (yellow card) 24'; Despotović 37' (pen.); Kvaratskhelia 40'; Bakayev (yellow card) 70'	Stadium: Arsenal Stadium; Attendance: 996; Referee: Sergey Ivanov

7 August 2021 3	Arsenal Tula	2 – 1	Krylia Sovetov	Tula
17:30 MSK (UTC+3)	Davitashvili 3'; Khlusevich 45+2'; Burlak (yellow card) 48'	Report	Sergeyev 49' (pen.); Soldatenkov (yellow card) 75'	Stadium: Arsenal Stadium; Attendance: 988; Referee: Evgeniy Kukulyak

15 August 2021 4	Krasnodar	3 – 2	Arsenal Tula	Krasnodar
20:00 MSK (UTC+3)	Cabella 24'; Gazinsky 29'; Córdoba 37' (penalty missed) 84'; Chernikov (yellow card) 56'	Report	Lutsenko 10', 86'; Björnström (yellow card) 65'; Novoseltsev (yellow card) 88'	Stadium: Krasnodar Stadium; Attendance: 500; Referee: Pavel Shadykhanov

21 August 2021 5	Arsenal Tula	1 – 1	Spartak Moscow	Tula
16:00 MSK (UTC+3)	Smolnikov (yellow card) 16'; Markov (yellow card) 27'; Guliyev (yellow card) 41'; Novoseltev (yellow card) 50'; Khlusevich 82' (yellow card) 90+2'	Report	Zobnin (yellow card) 32'; Hendrix (yellow card) 75'; Ponce 76'; Larsson (yellow card) 86'; Rasskazov (yellow card) 90+7'	Stadium: Arsenal Stadium; Attendance: 2,945; Referee: Vladimir Moskalev

26 August 2021 6	Akhmat Grozny	2 – 1	Arsenal Tula	Grozny
20:30 MSK (UTC+3)	Konaté 31' (yellow card) 63'; Utsiyev (yellow card) 84'; Konovalov 90+'	Report	Radaković (yellow card) 31'; Smolnikov (yellow card) 31'; Stepanov 38'; Panchenko (yellow card) 80'	Stadium: Akhmat-Arena; Attendance: 7,517; Referee: Alexey Sukhoi

12 September 2021 7	Arsenal Tula	2 – 2	CSKA Moscow	Tula
MSK (UTC+3)	Markov 18'; Kostadinov (yellow card) 45+2'; Kochenkov (yellow card) 45+4'; Novoseltsev 66', (yellow card) 84'	Report	Diveyev 5', (yellow card) 62'; Kuchayev (yellow card) 17'; Mukhin (yellow card) 57'; Chalov 74'	Stadium: Arsenal Stadium; Attendance: Ivan Sidenkov; Referee: 4,650

19 September 2021 8	Nizhny Novgorod	2 – 3	Arsenal Tula	Nizhny Novgorod
16:30 MSK (UTC+3)	Kalinsky 9' (yellow card) 75'; Kozlov 85'; Gotsuk (yellow card) 90+'	Report	Čaušić 17', 90+' (yellow card) 90+'; Sukhanov (yellow card) 32'; Markov 45+'	Stadium: Nizhny Novgorod Stadium; Attendance: 497; Referee: Artyom Lyubimov

27 September 2021 9	Ural Yekaterinburg	2 – 0	Arsenal Tula	Yekaterinburg
17:00 MSK (UTC+3)	Bicfalvi 5'; Yegorychev 32'; Gerasimov (yellow card) 45+'; Kuzmichyov (yellow card) 65'; Kolesnichenko (yellow card) 90+'; Pomazun (yellow card) 90+'	Report	Markov (yellow card) 19+'; Björnström (yellow card) 75'; Belyayev (yellow card) 90+'	Stadium: Central Stadium; Attendance: 751; Referee: Alexey Matyunin

2 October 2021 10	Arsenal Tula	0 – 0	Khimki	Tula
19:00 MSK (UTC+3)	K.Kangwa (yellow card) 38'; Novoseltsev (yellow card) 73'; Davitashvili (yellow card) 90+1'	Report	Filin (yellow card) 17'; Tikhy (yellow card) 29'; Bozhenov (yellow card) 59'	Stadium: Arsenal Stadium; Attendance: 2,868; Referee: Vladislav Bezborodov

16 October 2021 11	Arsenal Tula	2 – 1	Zenit St.Petersburg	Tula
14:00 MSK (UTC+3)	Markov (yellow card) 40'; Davitashvili 54'; Khlusevich (yellow card) 62'; Lutsenko (yellow card) 74'; Kochenkov (yellow card) 81'; K.Kangwa 90' (yellow card) 90+'	Report	Kuzyaev (yellow card) 19'; Dzyuba 88'	Stadium: Arsenal Stadium; Attendance: 4,867; Referee: Pavel Kukuyan^{ru}

23 October 2021 12	Rostov	4 – 0	Arsenal Tula	Rostov-on-Don
16:30 MSK (UTC+3)	Hashimoto (yellow card) 26' (goal) 27'; Sowe 29'; Poloz 62' (pen.); Terentyev 64'; Sukhomlinov (yellow card) 72'; Bastos (yellow card) 87'	Report		Stadium: Rostov Arena; Attendance: 4,224; Referee: Kirill Levnikov

31 October 2021 13	Arsenal Tula	1 – 2	Sochi	Tula
16:30 MSK (UTC+3)	Čaušić (yellow card) 56'; E.Kangwa 65'	Report	Cassierra 2', 79'; Yusupov (yellow card) 75'; Prokhin (yellow card) 84'; Zaika (yellow card) 88'	Stadium: Arsenal Stadium; Attendance: 0 Referee: Pavel Shadyhanov

6 November 2021 14	Arsenal Tula	0 – 0	Ufa	Tula
14:00 MSK (UTC+3)	Kambolov (yellow card) 16'; Tkachyov (yellow card) 36'; Radaković (yellow card) 45'	Report	Fishchenko (yellow card) 1' (yellow-red card) 18'	Stadium: Arsenal Stadium; Attendance: 1,652; Referee: Kirill Levnikov

21 November 2021 15	Dynamo Moscow	5 – 1	Arsenal Tula	Moscow
16:30 MSK (UTC+3)	Szymański 15'; Balbuena 22' (yellow card) 74'; Grulyov 25', 27'; Zakharyan 60'; Makarov (yellow card) 82'	Report	Kostadinov (yellow card) 7'; Radaković (yellow card) 58'; Khlusevich 85'; K.Kangwa (yellow card) 90'	Stadium: VTB Arena; Attendance: 6,579; Referee: Vitali Meshkov

29 November 2021 16	Arsenal Tula	3 – 1	Lokomotiv Moscow	Tula
19:00 MSK (UTC+3)	Khlusevich 17'; Markov 40', 58'; Kostadinov (yellow card) 73'; Khlusevich (yellow card) 77'; Kambolov (yellow card) 84'	Report	Rybus (yellow card) 53'; Jedvaj (yellow card) 60'; Lisakovich (yellow card) 71'; Pablo 90+3'	Stadium: Arsenal Stadium; Attendance: 3,255; Referee: Vladimir Moskalyov

5 December 2021 17	Khimki	1 – 2	Arsenal Tula	Khimki
14:00 MSK (UTC+3)	Glushakov (yellow card) 27'; Idowu (yellow card) 32' (yellow-red card) 90'; Mirzov 36' (pen.); Nabiullin (yellow card) 85'	Report	K.Kangwa (yellow card) 22'; Davitashvili 61'; Čaušić (yellow card) 83'; E.Kangwa 87'	Stadium: Arena Khimki; Attendance: 761; Referee: Kukulyak Lazarevich

11 December 2021 18	CSKA Moscow	2 – 0	Arsenal Tula	Moscow
16:30 MSK (UTC+3)	Zabolotny 33', 76' (pen.); Diveyev (yellow card) 69'; Akhmetov (yellow card) 80'	Report	Belyayev (yellow card) 49'; Radaković (yellow card) 75'	Stadium: VEB Arena; Attendance: 0 Referee: Igor Panin
Note: Match played behind closed doors.

26 February 2021 19	Sochi	2 – 0	Arsenal Tula	Sochi
16:30 MSK (UTC+3)	Zaika (yellow card) 9'; Angban 50'; Prokhin (yellow card) 59'; Rodrigão (yellow card) 62'; Yusupov 77' (pen.)	Report	Markov (yellow card) 10'; Belyayev (yellow card) 27'; Stepanov (yellow card) 45+'	Stadium: Fisht Olympic Stadium; Attendance: 3,234; Referee: Vladislav Bezborodov

6 March 2022 20	Krylia Sovetov	2 – 2	Arsenal Tula	Samara
14:00 MSK (UTC+3)	Bijl (yellow card) 44'; Sarveli 52'; Yezhov (yellow card) 78'; Ignatyev 83'	Report	K.Kangwa 13'; Stepanov (yellow card) 54'; Čaušić (yellow card) 61' (yellow-red card) 86'; Davitashvili (yellow card) 65'; Despotović 70' (pen.); Guliyev (yellow card) 77'; Kochenkov (yellow card) 88'; Sukhanov (yellow card) 90+2'}	Stadium: Solidarnost Arena; Attendance: 3,756; Referee: Pavel Shadykhanov

12 March 2022 21	Arsenal Tula	1 – 4	Dynamo Moscow	Tula
16:30 MSK (UTC+3)	E.Kangwa (yellow card) 8' (goal) 30'; K.Kangwa (yellow card) 18'; Despotović (yellow card) 35'; Kostadinov (yellow card) 37'	Report	Smolov 14'; Moro (yellow card) 45'; Zakharyan 46'; Fomin 76' (pen.); Tyukavin 90+'	Stadium: Arsenal Stadium; Attendance: 5,246; Referee: Yan Bobrovsky

19 March 2022 22	Zenit St.Petersburg	3 – 0	Arsenal Tula	Saint Petersburg
19:30 MSK (UTC+3)	Malcom 44', 55'; Alberto 89'	Report	Sokol (yellow card) 33'; Despotović (yellow card) 38'; Smolnikov (yellow card) 41'	Stadium: Krestovsky Stadium; Attendance: 31,426; Referee: Sergei Karasev

2 April 2022 23	Arsenal Tula	0 – 0	Akhmat Grozny	Tula
14:00 MSK (UTC+3)	Čaušić (red card) 45+'; Panchenko (yellow card) 64'	Report	Todorović (yellow card) 90+'	Stadium: Arsenal Stadium; Attendance: 3,244; Referee: Vitali Meshkov

10 April 2022 24	Spartak Moscow	3 – 0	Arsenal Tula	Moscow
16:30 MSK (UTC+3)	Zobnin 53'; Nicholson 57', 75'; Gigot (yellow card) 62'	Report	K.Kangwa (yellow card) 32' (yellow-red card) 86'; Radaković (yellow card) 44'	Stadium: Otkritie Arena; Attendance: 7,022; Referee: Vladislav Bezborodov

17 April 2022 25	Arsenal Tula	1 – 2	Rostov	Tula
14:00 MSK (UTC+3)	Kostadinov (yellow card) 16'; Stepanov (yellow card) 21'; Smolnikov (yellow card) 38' (goal) 44'; Belyayev (yellow card) 90+'; Markov (yellow card) 90+'	Report	Komlichenko 10'; Bayramyan (yellow card) 38'; Langovich (yellow card) 58'; Poloz 87'	Stadium: Arsenal Stadium; Attendance: 3,983; Referee: Evgeniy Kukulyak

24 April 2022 26	Rubin Kazan	1 – 0	Arsenal Tula	Kazan
14:00 MSK (UTC+3)	Lomovitsky 22'	Report	Kaynov (yellow card) 50'	Stadium: Ak Bars Arena; Attendance: 4,773; Referee: Artyom Chistyakov

2 May 2022 27	Arsenal Tula	2 – 2	Nizhny Novgorod	Tula
19:00 MSK (UTC+3)	Sokol (yellow card) 32'; Tkachyov 45+'; Despotović (penalty missed) 66'; Lutsenko 71'; Čaušić (yellow card) 89'	Report	Gotsuk 18' (yellow card) 79'; Kalinsky 30'; Suleymanov (yellow card) 50'	Stadium: Arsenal Stadium; Attendance: 4,980; Referee: Sergei Karasev

8 May 2022 28	Arsenal Tula	1 – 1	Krasnodar	Tula
16:30 MSK (UTC+3)	K.Kangwa 19' (yellow card) 80'; Kaynov (yellow card) 22'; Smolnikov (yellow card) 63'; Kostadinov (yellow card) 77'	Report	Litvinov (yellow card) 31'; Spertsyan 76' (pen.); Matsukatov (yellow card) 83'; Sorokin (red card) 90'	Stadium: Arsenal Stadium; Attendance: 7,254; Referee: Sergey Ivanov

14 May 2022 29	Ufa	2 – 1	Arsenal Tula	Ufa
14:00 MSK (UTC+3)	Kabutov 13' (yellow card) 90+'; Agalarov 76'	Report	Smolnikov (yellow card) 24'; K.Kangwa 25'; E.Kangwa (yellow card) 40' (yellow-red card) 72'; Kostadinov (yellow card) 45'	Stadium: BetBoom Arena; Attendance: 6,077; Referee: Vitali Meshkov

21 May 2022 30	Arsenal Tula	1 – 2	Ural Yekaterinburg	Tula
17:00 MSK (UTC+3)	Markov (red card) 30'; Kaynov 42'	Report	Augustyniak 31' (pen.); Miškić 33'	Stadium: Arsenal Stadium; Attendance: 3,578; Referee: Pavel Kukuyan

=== Russian Cup ===
==== Round of 32 ====
Pos	Team	Pld	W	PW	PL	L	GF	GA	GD	Pts	Final result
1	Arsenal Tula (Q)	2	1	1	0	0	7	2	+5	5	Advance to Play-off
2	Veles Moscow	2	1	0	1	0	4	1	+3	4	
3	Dynamo Bryansk	2	0	0	0	2	1	9	−8	0	

Rules for classification: 1) Points; 2) Wins; 3) Goal differential; 4) Goals scored; 5) Head-to-head result; 6) Disciplinary points.
(Q) Qualified to the phase indicated

22 September 2021 2	Dynamo Bryansk	1 – 6	Arsenal Tula	Bryansk
16:00 MSK (UTC+3)	Aloyan (yellow card) 25'; M.Novikov 45+2'; Y.Shanin (yellow card) 64'; Sorokin (yellow card) 75'	Report	Davitashvili (yellow card) 7' (goal) 58'; Sokol 11'; Panchenko 14'; Khlusevich 19'; K.Kangwa 44'; Tudorie 86'	Stadium: Dynamo Stadium; Referee: Igor Kaplenkov

27 October 2021 3	Veles Moscow	1 – 1 (3 – 4 p)	Arsenal Tula	Moscow
14:00 MSK (UTC+3)	Vulfov (yellow card) 1'; Galoyan 75'; Tarasov (yellow card) 60' (yellow-red card) 90'; Yezhkov (yellow card) 90+3'	Report	E.Kangwa 33'; Sukhanov (yellow card) 38'; Kambolov (yellow card) 45'; Dovbnya (yellow card) 63'; Khlusevich (yellow card) 90'; Panchenko (yellow card) 90+5'; Smolnikov (red card) 90+5'	Stadium: Avangard Stadium; Referee: Rafael Shafeev
	Penalties
	Osipov (penalty missed); Galoyan (penalty scored); Lopatin (penalty missed); Yezhkov (penalty scored); Kertanov (penalty scored)		(penalty scored) Lutsenko; (penalty scored) Kostadinov; (penalty missed) Davitashvili; (penalty scored) E.Kangwa; (penalty scored) Tkachyov

==== Knockout stage ====
2 March 2022 Round of 16	Alania Vladikavkaz	1 – 0	Arsenal Tula	Grozny
19:00 MSK (UTC+3)	Khubulov 4'; Khabalov (yellow card) 19'; Kochiyev (yellow card) 37'; Kachmazov (yellow card) 90+2'	Report	Radaković (yellow card) 66'; Belyayev (yellow card) 70'; Čaušić (yellow card) 81'	Stadium: Sultan Bilimkhanov Stadium; Referee: Evgeny Turbin
Note: Alania Vladikavkaz play their home games at the Sultan Bilimkhanov Stadium in Grozny whilst their Republican Spartak Stadium in Vladikavkaz is renovated.

== Squad statistics ==
As of match played 21 May 2022

=== Appearances and goals ===
No.	Pos	Nat	Player	Total		Premier League		Russian Cup	
No.	Pos	Nat	Player	Apps	Goals	Apps	Goals	Apps	Goals
1	GK	(Russia) RUS	Anton Kochenkov	20	0	19	0	1	0
3	DF	(Russia) RUS	Artyom Sokol	23	1	17+3	0	3	1
4	DF	(Serbia) SRB	Uroš Radaković	19	0	17+1	0	1	0
5	DF	(Russia) RUS	Taras Burlak	2	0	2	0	0	0
6	DF	(Russia) RUS	Igor Smolnikov	27	1	27	1	0	0
7	FW	(Russia) RUS	Yevgeni Markov	30	4	16+12	4	2	0
8	FW	(Russia) RUS	Kirill Panchenko	13	1	2+8	0	2+1	1
9	MF	(Russia) RUS	Ayaz Guliyev	26	0	16+8	0	2	0
10	FW	(Zambia) ZAM	Evans Kangwa	25	4	16+6	3	2+1	1
11	MF	(Russia) RUS	Sergei Tkachyov	21	2	16+4	2	0+1	0
20	MF	(Serbia) SRB	Goran Čaušić	24	2	23	2	1	0
21	MF	(Russia) RUS	Vladislav Panteleyev	5	0	2+3	0	0	0
25	DF	(Russia) RUS	Danil Stepanov	30	1	24+4	1	1+1	0
28	FW	(Serbia) SRB	Đorđe Despotović	11	1	7+3	1	0+1	0
36	GK	(Russia) RUS	Mikhail Levashov	10	0	9+1	0	0	0
38	DF	(Russia) RUS	Ilya Kuleshin	1	0	1	0	0	0
44	MF	(Zambia) ZAM	Kings Kangwa	22	5	17+2	4	2+1	1
48	FW	(Russia) RUS	Yevgeni Lutsenko	22	3	9+12	3	0+1	0
50	GK	(Russia) RUS	Yegor Shamov	4	0	2	0	2	0
60	DF	(Russia) RUS	Maksim Belyayev	14	0	10+2	0	1+1	0
70	MF	(Bulgaria) BUL	Georgi Kostadinov	27	0	21+4	0	1+1	0
73	MF	(Russia) RUS	Ansor Khabibov	8	0	0+8	0	0	0
76	DF	(Russia) RUS	Artyom Sukhanov	10	0	4+4	0	2	0
78	MF	(Russia) RUS	Maksim Kaynov	7	1	6+1	1	0	0
99	DF	(Russia) RUS	Ivan Novoseltsev	16	1	15	1	1	0
Players away from the club on loan:
Players who appeared for Arsenal Tula but left during the season:
2	MF	(Russia) RUS	Ruslan Kambolov	5	0	1+3	0	1	0
16	DF	(Sweden) SWE	Axel Björnström	10	0	2+6	0	2	0
22	MF	(Georgia (country)) GEO	Zuriko Davitashvili	23	4	14+6	3	2+1	1
30	FW	(Romania) ROU	Alexandru Tudorie	8	1	0+6	0	1+1	1
82	MF	(Russia) RUS	Daniil Khlusevich	18	5	15+1	4	2	1
90	DF	(Russia) RUS	Aleksandr Dovbnya	4	0	0+2	0	1+1	0

=== Goal scorers ===
Place	Position	Nation	Number	Name	Premier League	Russian Cup	Total
1	MF	(Russia)	82	Daniil Khlusevich	4	1	5
1	MF	(Zambia)	44	Kings Kangwa	4	1	5
3	FW	(Russia)	7	Yevgeni Markov	4	0	4
3	MF	(Georgia (country))	22	Zuriko Davitashvili	3	1	4
3	FW	(Zambia)	10	Evans Kangwa	3	1	4
6	FW	(Russia)	48	Yevgeni Lutsenko	3	0	3
7	MF	(Serbia)	20	Goran Čaušić	2	0	2
7	MF	(Russia)	11	Sergei Tkachyov	2	0	2
9	DF	(Russia)	25	Danil Stepanov	1	0	1
9	DF	(Russia)	99	Ivan Novoseltsev	1	0	1
9	FW	(Serbia)	28	Đorđe Despotović	1	0	1
9	DF	(Russia)	6	Igor Smolnikov	1	0	1
9	MF	(Russia)	78	Maksim Kaynov	1	0	1
9	DF	(Russia)	3	Artyom Sokol	0	1	1
9	FW	(Russia)	8	Kirill Panchenko	0	1	1
9	FW	(Romania)	30	Alexandru Tudorie	0	1	1
Total					30	7	37

=== Clean sheets ===
Place	Position	Nation	Number	Name	Premier League	Russian Cup	Total
1	GK	(Russia)	1	Anton Kochenkov	2	0	2
2	GK	(Russia)	36	Mikhail Levashov	1	0	1
Total					2	0	2

Kochenkov & Levashov both played in Arsenal's 0-0 draw against Akhmat Grozny on 2 April 2022

=== Disciplinary record ===
Number	Nation	Position	Name	Premier League		Russian Cup		Total	
Number	Nation	Position	Name	Yellow card	Red card	Yellow card	Red card	Yellow card	Red card
1	(Russia)	GK	Anton Kochenkov	3	0	0	0	3	0
3	(Russia)	DF	Artyom Sokol	4	1	0	0	4	1
4	(Serbia)	DF	Uroš Radaković	5	0	1	0	6	0
5	(Russia)	DF	Taras Burlak	1	0	0	0	1	0
6	(Russia)	DF	Igor Smolnikov	7	0	0	1	7	1
7	(Russia)	FW	Yevgeni Markov	6	1	0	0	6	1
8	(Russia)	FW	Kirill Panchenko	2	0	1	0	3	0
9	(Russia)	MF	Ayaz Guliyev	2	0	0	0	2	0
10	(Zambia)	FW	Evans Kangwa	3	1	0	0	3	1
11	(Russia)	MF	Sergei Tkachyov	1	0	0	0	1	0
20	(Serbia)	MF	Goran Čaušić	6	2	1	0	7	2
25	(Russia)	DF	Danil Stepanov	3	0	0	0	3	0
28	(Serbia)	FW	Đorđe Despotović	2	0	0	0	2	0
44	(Zambia)	MF	Kings Kangwa	8	1	0	0	8	1
48	(Russia)	FW	Yevgeni Lutsenko	1	0	0	0	1	0
60	(Russia)	DF	Maksim Belyayev	4	0	1	0	5	0
70	(Bulgaria)	MF	Georgi Kostadinov	8	0	0	0	8	0
76	(Russia)	DF	Artyom Sukhanov	2	0	1	0	3	0
78	(Russia)	MF	Maksim Kaynov	2	0	0	0	2	0
99	(Russia)	DF	Ivan Novoseltsev	4	0	0	0	4	0
Players away on loan:
Players who left Arsenal Tula during the season:
2	(Russia)	MF	Ruslan Kambolov	2	0	1	0	3	0
16	(Sweden)	DF	Axel Björnström	2	0	0	0	2	0
22	(Georgia (country))	MF	Zuriko Davitashvili	2	0	1	0	3	0
82	(Russia)	MF	Daniil Khlusevich	3	0	1	0	4	0
90	(Russia)	DF	Aleksandr Dovbnya	0	0	1	0	1	0
Total				83	6	9	1	92	7
