= Maksim Kaynov =

Russian footballer

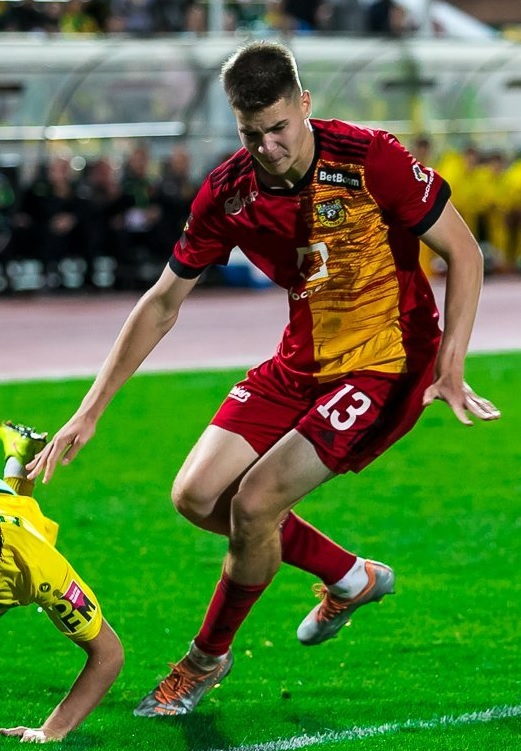
- Kaynov with Arsenal Tula in 2022

Personal information
- Full name: Maksim Konstantinovich Kaynov
- Date of birth: 24 March 2002 (age 24)
- Place of birth: Bronnitsy, Russia
- Height: 1.91 m (6 ft 3 in)
- Position: Defensive midfielder

Team information
- Current team: Ural Yekaterinburg (on loan from Sochi)
- Number: 13

Youth career
- –2013: SDYuSShOR im. Syroyezhkina Bronnitsy
- 2013–2021: UOR #5 Yegoryevsk
- 2021–2022: Arsenal Tula

Senior career*
Years	Team	Apps	(Gls)
2022–2025	Arsenal Tula	87	(3)
2022–2024	Arsenal-2 Tula	6	(2)
2025	→ Sochi (loan)	12	(1)
2025–	Sochi	10	(1)
2025–2026	→ Rotor Volgograd (loan)	25	(1)
2026–	→ Ural Yekaterinburg (loan)	0	(0)
- * Club domestic league appearances and goals as of 10 September 2026

Maksim Konstantinovich Kaynov (Russian: Максим Константинович Кайнов; born 24 March 2002) is a Russian football player who plays as a defensive midfielder for Ural Yekaterinburg on loan from Sochi.

== Club career ==
He made his debut in the Russian Premier League for Arsenal Tula on 2 April 2022 in a game against Akhmat Grozny.

On 20 August 2025, Kaynov was loaned by Rotor Volgograd, with an option to buy.

== Personal life ==
He is a son of former footballer Konstantin Kaynov.

== Career statistics ==
As of 29 July 2025

Club	Season	League			Cup		Continental		Other		Total	
Club	Season	Division	Apps	Goals	Apps	Goals	Apps	Goals	Apps	Goals	Apps	Goals
Arsenal Tula	2021–22	Russian Premier League	7	1	0	0	–		–		7	1
Arsenal Tula	2022–23	Russian First League	29	2	0	0	–		–		29	2
Arsenal Tula	2023–24	Russian First League	30	0	0	0	–		2 (Note: Appearances in promotion play-offs)	1	32	1
Arsenal Tula	2024–25	Russian First League	21	0	0	0	–		–		21	0
Arsenal Tula	Total		87	3	0	0	0	0	2	1	89	4
Arsenal-2 Tula	2021–22	Russian Second League	1	1	–		–		–		1	1
Arsenal-2 Tula	2022–23	Russian Second League	5	1	–		–		–		5	1
Arsenal-2 Tula	Total		6	2	0	0	0	0	0	0	6	2
Sochi (loan)	2024–25	Russian First League	12	1	–		–		2	0	14	1
Sochi	2025–26	Russian Premier League	0	0	1	0	–		–		1	0
Career total			105	6	1	0	0	0	4	1	110	7
