= Ilya Kuleshin =

Russian footballer (2000–2026)

Personal information
- Full name: Ilya Vladimirovich Kuleshin
- Date of birth: 29 August 2000
- Place of birth: Yukhnov, Kaluga Oblast, Russia
- Date of death: 9 August 2026 (aged 25)
- Height: 1.79 m (5 ft 10 in)
- Position: Defender

Youth career
- Arsenal Tula

Senior career*
Years	Team	Apps	(Gls)
2020–2021	FC Khimik-Arsenal	28	(3)
2021–2024	Arsenal-2 Tula	61	(2)
2022–2024	Arsenal Tula	4	(0)
2024–2025	Avangard Kursk	41	(1)
2025	FC Khimik Dzerzhinsk	7	(0)
- * Club domestic league appearances and goals

Ilya Vladimirovich Kuleshin (Russian: Илья Владимирович Кулешин; 29 August 2000 – 9 August 2026) was a Russian professional footballer who played as a defender.

== Career ==
Kuleshin made his debut in the Russian Premier League for Arsenal Tula on 21 May 2022 in a game against FC Ural Yekaterinburg.

== Death ==
Kuleshin died on 9 August 2026, at the age of 25, due to complications from cancer.

== Career statistics ==
Appearances and goals by club, season and competition
Club	Season	League			Cup		Continental		Total	
Club	Season	Division	Apps	Goals	Apps	Goals	Apps	Goals	Apps	Goals
Khimik-Arsenal	2020–21	Russian National League 2	28	3	–		–		28	3
Arsenal-2 Tula	2021–22	Russian National League 2	21	2	–		–		21	2
Arsenal Tula	2021–22	Russian Premier League	1	0	0	0	–		1	0
Career total			50	5	0	0	0	0	50	5
