= Artyom Sukhanov =

Russian footballer

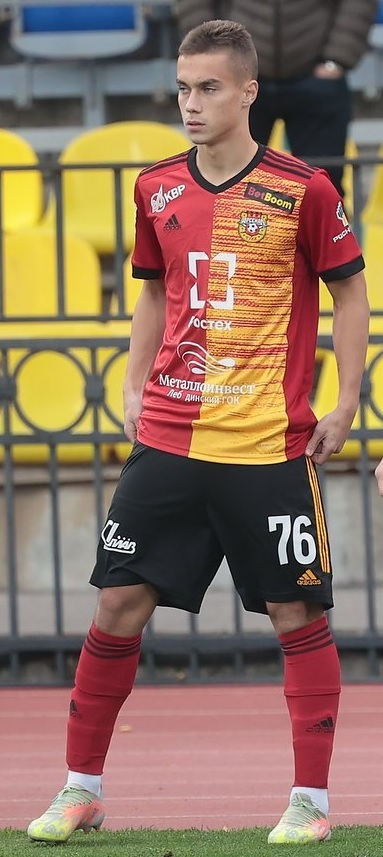
- Sukhanov with Arsenal Tula in 2021

Personal information
- Full name: Artyom Romanovich Sukhanov
- Date of birth: 29 May 2001 (age 25)
- Place of birth: Vologda, Russia
- Height: 1.77 m (5 ft 10 in)
- Position: Right-back

Team information
- Current team: FC KAMAZ Naberezhnye Chelny
- Number: 76

Youth career
- –2019: FC Lokomotiv Moscow
- 2020–2021: FC Arsenal Tula

Senior career*
Years	Team	Apps	(Gls)
2021–2025	FC Arsenal-2 Tula	10	(1)
2021–2025	FC Arsenal Tula	38	(1)
2024–2025	→ FC KAMAZ Naberezhnye Chelny (loan)	17	(1)
2025–	FC KAMAZ Naberezhnye Chelny	7	(0)
- * Club domestic league appearances and goals as of 16 May 2026

Artyom Romanovich Sukhanov (Russian: Артём Романович Суханов; born 29 May 2001) is a Russian football player who plays as a right back for FC KAMAZ Naberezhnye Chelny.

== Club career ==
He made his debut in the Russian Premier League for FC Arsenal Tula on 15 August 2021 in a game against FC Krasnodar.

== Career statistics ==
As of 28 May 2022

Club	Season	League			Cup		Continental		Total	
Club	Season	Division	Apps	Goals	Apps	Goals	Apps	Goals	Apps	Goals
Arsenal Tula	2021–22	RPL	8	0	2	0	–		10	0
Arsenal-2 Tula	2021–22	FNL 2	7	1	–		–		7	1
Career total			15	1	2	0	0	0	17	1
