= Axel Björnström =

Swedish footballer

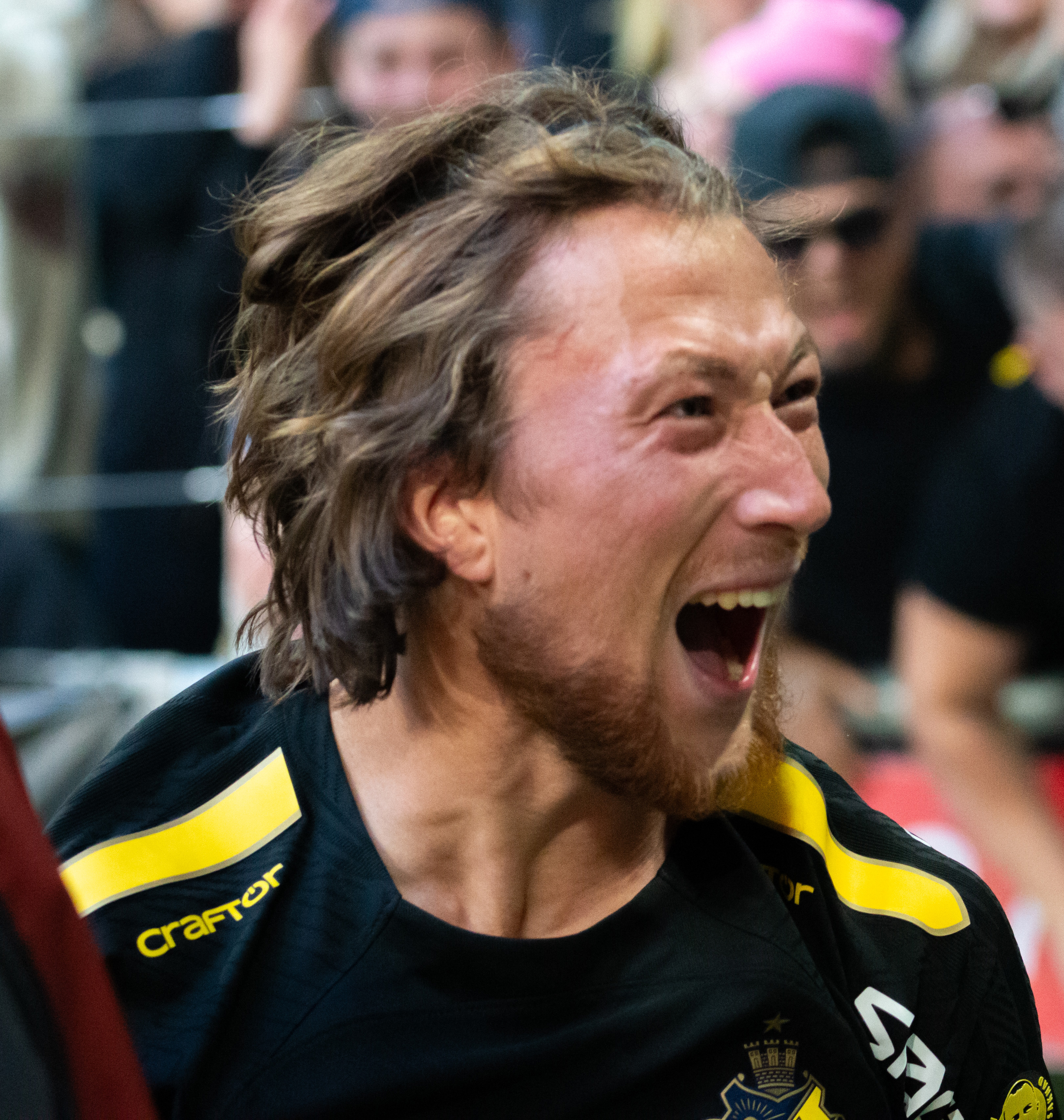

Personal information
- Full name: Axel Erik Gustaf Björnström
- Date of birth: 10 September 1995 (age 31)
- Place of birth: Sweden
- Height: 1.76 m (5 ft 9 in)
- Position: Defender

Team information
- Current team: IFK Värnamo
- Number: 3

Youth career
- FC Djursholm
- –2014: Vasalund IF

Senior career*
Years	Team	Apps	(Gls)
2015–2017	Vasalund IF	64	(11)
2018–2021	IK Sirius	79	(6)
2021–2022	Arsenal Tula	8	(0)
2022–2024	AIK	64	(0)
2025–	IFK Värnamo	57	(3)
- * Club domestic league appearances and goals as of 12 November 2026

Axel Erik Gustaf Björnström (born 10 September 1995) is a Swedish professional footballer who plays as a left back or left midfielder for IFK Värnamo.

== Club career ==
Björnström signed his first professional contract with Vasalund IF in 2015.

On 6 July 2021, Björnström signed a two-year contract with Russian Premier League club Arsenal Tula. On 8 March 2022, the president of Arsenal Tula confirmed that Björnström left the club earlier in the year.

On 9 March 2022, Björnström signed a contract with AIK until the end of 2024.

On 31 January 2025, Björnström joined IFK Värnamo on a three-year deal.

== Career statistics ==
As of 11 December 2021

Club	Season	League			Cup		Continental		Other		Total	
Club	Season	Division	Apps	Goals	Apps	Goals	Apps	Goals	Apps	Goals	Apps	Goals
Vasalund IF	2015	Ettan	14	1	1	0	–		–		15	1
Vasalund IF	2016	Ettan	25	9	1	0	–		2 (Note: Appearances in promotion play-offs)	0	28	9
Vasalund IF	2017	Ettan	25	1	2	1	–		–		27	2
Vasalund IF	Total		64	11	4	1	0	0	2	0	70	12
Sirius	2018	Allsvenskan	15	0	3	0	–		–		18	0
Sirius	2019	Allsvenskan	25	1	4	0	–		–		29	1
Sirius	2020	Allsvenskan	30	5	3	1	–		–		33	6
Sirius	2021	Allsvenskan	9	0	3	1	–		–		12	1
Sirius	Total		79	6	13	2	0	0	0	0	92	8
Arsenal Tula	2021–22	RPL	8	0	2	0	–		–		10	0
Career total			151	17	19	3	0	0	2	0	172	20
