= Miloš Mihajlov =

Serbian footballer

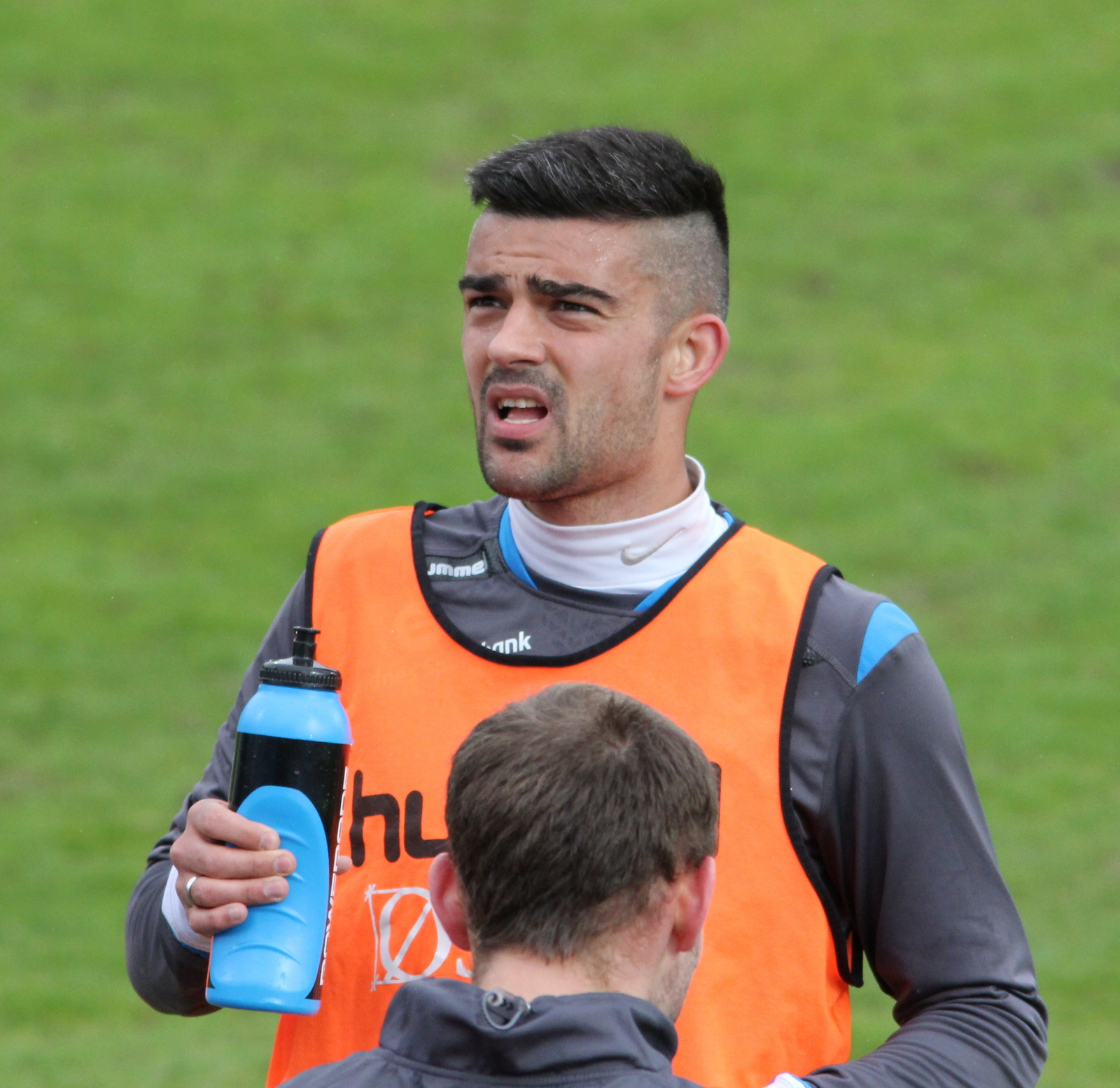
- Mihajlov with Sandnes Ulf in May 2013

Personal information
- Date of birth: 15 December 1982 (age 43)
- Place of birth: Belgrade, SFR Yugoslavia
- Height: 1.84 m (6 ft 0 in)
- Position: Centre-back

Youth career
- Voždovac

Senior career*
Years	Team	Apps	(Gls)
2001–2006	Voždovac	89	(2)
2006–2007	Partizan	32	(1)
2008–2009	Konyaspor	39	(2)
2009–2010	Politehnica Iași	22	(0)
2010	Changchun Yatai	16	(1)
2011–2012	Zhetysu	55	(4)
2013	Sandnes Ulf	23	(0)
2014	Voždovac	27	(0)
2015	Zhetysu	19	(0)
2015–2019	Voždovac	133	(5)
2020–2021	Inđija	24	(0)
2021	Železničar Pančevo	14	(0)
- * Club domestic league appearances and goals

Miloš Mihajlov (Serbian Cyrillic: Милош Михајлов; born 15 December 1982) is a Serbian retired footballer who played as a defender.

== Career ==
Born in Belgrade, Mihajlov started out at Voždovac. He helped the Dragons win the Serbian League Belgrade in the 2003–04 season and gain promotion to the 2004–05 Serbian Second League. Following the club's merger with Železnik, Mihajlov made his debut in the top flight during the 2005–06 campaign.

In June 2006, Mihajlov signed a four-year contract with Partizan. He scored the opening goal in the Belgrade derby on 24 February 2007, heading in Marko Lomić's corner kick, as Partizan won the game 4–2. In January 2008, Mihajlov moved to Turkish club Konyaspor. He subsequently played for Romanian club Politehnica Iași and Chinese club Changchun Yatai.

In 2011, Mihajlov moved to Kazakhstan, staying there for the next two seasons with Zhetysu. He also played for Norwegian club Sandnes Ulf in 2013. In January 2014, Mihajlov returned to Serbia and signed for his former club Voždovac.

In February 2015, Mihajlov rejoined Zhetysu. He spent only six months there, before again returning to Voždovac.

== Career statistics ==
As of 19 May 2019

Club	Season	League			Cup		Continental		Total	
Club	Season	Division	Apps	Goals	Apps	Goals	Apps	Goals	Apps	Goals
Partizan	2006–07	SuperLiga	17	1	3	0	3	0	23	1
Partizan	2007–08	SuperLiga	15	0	1	0	2	0	18	0
Partizan	Total		32	1	4	0	5	0	41	1
Konyaspor	2007–08	Süper Lig	13	0	0	0	—		13	0
Konyaspor	2008–09	Süper Lig	26	2	2	0	—		28	2
Konyaspor	Total		39	2	2	0	—		41	2
Politehnica Iași	2009–10	Liga I	22	0	1	0	—		23	0
Changchun Yatai	2010	Super League	16	1			0	0	16	1
Zhetysu	2011	Premier League	30	2			—		30	2
Zhetysu	2012	Premier League	25	2	5	1	2	0	32	3
Zhetysu	Total		55	4	5	1	2	0	62	5
Sandnes Ulf	2013	Eliteserien	23	0	2	0	—		25	0
Voždovac	2013–14	SuperLiga	14	0	0	0	—		14	0
Voždovac	2014–15	SuperLiga	13	0	2	0	—		15	0
Voždovac	Total		27	0	2	0	—		29	0
Zhetysu	2015	Premier League	19	0	2	0	—		21	0
Voždovac	2015–16	SuperLiga	28	3	2	0	—		30	3
Voždovac	2016–17	SuperLiga	32	0	2	0	—		34	0
Voždovac	2017–18	SuperLiga	35	1	1	2	—		36	3
Voždovac	2018–19	SuperLiga	33	1	0	0	—		33	1
Voždovac	Total		128	5	5	2	—		133	7
Career total			361	13	23	3	7	0	391	16
