= Isael =

Isael is a given name. It may refer to:

- Isael Villa Villa (born 1956), Mexican politician
- Isael Álvarez (born 1974), Cuban boxer
- Isael (footballer) (born 1988), Isael da Silva Barbosa, Brazilian football midfielder

== See also ==
- Israel (name)
