= Valeri Sorokin (footballer, born 1987) =

Russian footballer

Personal information
- Full name: Valeri Aleksandrovich Sorokin
- Date of birth: 27 March 1987 (age 39)
- Place of birth: Kirov, Russian SFSR
- Height: 1.85 m (6 ft 1 in)
- Position: Midfielder

Youth career
- DYuSSh-5 Kirov

Senior career*
Years	Team	Apps	(Gls)
2005–2013	FC Dynamo Kirov	172	(14)
2011	→ FC Amur-2010 Blagoveshchensk (loan)	26	(0)
2013–2016	FC Nosta Novotroitsk	70	(7)
2016–2018	FC Spartak Kostroma	47	(6)
2018–2022	FC Dynamo Bryansk	89	(14)
- * Club domestic league appearances and goals

Valeri Aleksandrovich Sorokin (Russian: Валерий Александрович Сорокин; born 27 March 1987) is a Russian former football player.

== Club career ==
He made his debut in the Russian Football National League for FC Dynamo Bryansk on 1 August 2020 in a game against FC Orenburg, as a starter.
