= Đorđe Despotović =

Serbian footballer

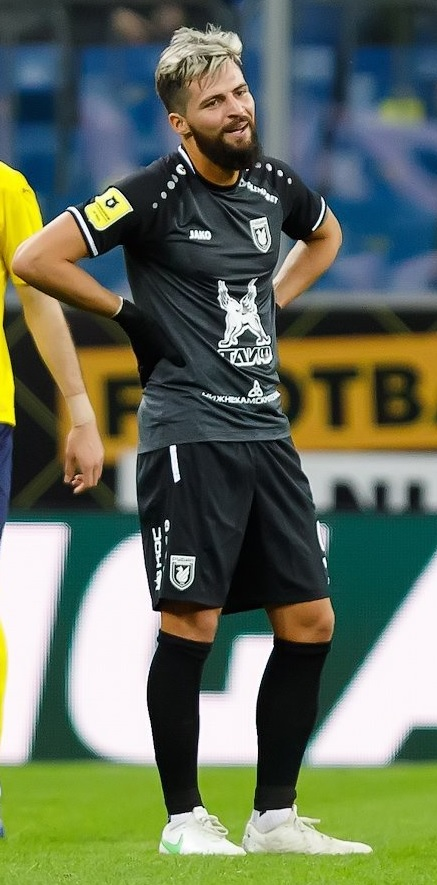
- Despotović with Rubin Kazan in 2021

Personal information
- Date of birth: 4 March 1992 (age 34)
- Place of birth: Loznica, SR Serbia, SFR Yugoslavia
- Height: 1.90 m (6 ft 3 in)
- Position: Forward

Youth career
- Red Star Belgrade

Senior career*
| Years | Team | Apps | (Gls) |
| 2010–2011 | Red Star Belgrade | 0 | (0) |
| 2010 | → Sopot (loan) | 6 | (2) |
| 2011–2013 | Spartak Subotica | 54 | (13) |
| 2013–2014 | Lokeren | 4 | (0) |
| 2014–2015 | Red Star Belgrade | 10 | (1) |
| 2015 | → Zhetysu (loan) | 18 | (5) |
| 2015 | → Kairat (loan) | 9 | (8) |
| 2016–2018 | Astana | 53 | (14) |
| 2017 | → Tobol (loan) | 16 | (3) |
| 2018–2020 | Orenburg | 43 | (12) |
| 2020–2022 | Rubin Kazan | 35 | (15) |
| 2022–2023 | Arsenal Tula | 21 | (1) |
| 2024 | Budućnost | 17 | (9) |
| 2024–2025 | Borac Banja Luka | 28 | (15) |
| 2025–2026 | Buriram United | 0 | (0) |

International career
| 2010–2011 | Serbia U19 | 8 | (3) |
| 2011–2012 | Serbia U21 | 7 | (0) |
- * Club domestic league appearances and goals as of 15 August 2026

Đorđe Despotović (Serbian Cyrillic: Ђорђе Деспотовић; born 4 March 1992) is a Serbian footballer who plays as a centre forward.

== Career ==
In February 2015, Despotović moved on loan to FC Zhetysu for six-months. In July 2015 he went for another loan move to FC Kairat. The following February, Despotović signed for FC Astana.

On 15 February 2017, Despotović moved to FC Tobol on loan for the 2017 season, but the loan was cut short and Despotović returned to Astana on 15 June 2017. Despotović left Astana on 23 July 2018 at the end of his contract.

On 31 August 2018, Despotović signed for FC Orenburg. On 1 June 2020, Despotović left FC Orenburg after his contract had expired.

On 21 July 2020, he signed a 3-year contract with another Russian Premier League club Rubin Kazan. On 30 January 2022, his contract with Rubin was terminated by mutual consent.

On 2 February 2022, Despotović signed a 3-year contract with Arsenal Tula.

== Career statistics ==
As of match played 21 May 2022

| Club | Season | League | | | National Cup | | Continental | | Other | | Total | |
| Club | Season | Division | Apps | Goals | Apps | Goals | Apps | Goals | Apps | Goals | Apps | Goals |
|---|---|---|---|---|---|---|---|---|---|---|---|---|
| Sopot (loan) | 2010–11 | Serbian League Belgrade | 6 | 2 | — | | — | | — | | 6 | 2 |
| Spartak Subotica | 2011–12 | Serbian SuperLiga | 27 | 1 | 1 | 2 | — | | — | | 28 | 3 |
| Spartak Subotica | 2012–13 | Serbian SuperLiga | 27 | 12 | 2 | 1 | — | | — | | 29 | 13 |
| Spartak Subotica | Total | | 54 | 13 | 3 | 3 | — | | — | | 57 | 16 |
| Lokeren | 2013–14 | Belgian Pro League | 4 | 0 | 1 | 1 | — | | 0 | 0 | 5 | 1 |
| Red Star Belgrade | 2014–15 | Serbian SuperLiga | 10 | 1 | 2 | 1 | — | | — | | 12 | 2 |
| Red Star Belgrade | 2015–16 | Serbian SuperLiga | 0 | 0 | 0 | 0 | — | | — | | 0 | 0 |
| Red Star Belgrade | Total | | 10 | 1 | 2 | 1 | — | | — | | 12 | 2 |
| Zhetysu (loan) | 2015 | Kazakhstan Premier League | 18 | 5 | 2 | 0 | — | | — | | 20 | 5 |
| Kairat (loan) | 2015 | Kazakhstan Premier League | 9 | 8 | 1 | 0 | 6 (Note: Appearances in the UEFA Europa League) | 1 | 0 | 0 | 16 | 9 |
| Astana | 2016 | Kazakhstan Premier League | 31 | 8 | 4 | 3 | 11 (Note: Four appearances in the UEFA Champions League, seven appearances, two goals in the UEFA Europa League) | 2 | 1 | 0 | 47 | 13 |
| Astana | 2017 | Kazakhstan Premier League | 7 | 1 | 0 | 0 | 4 (Note: Two appearances in the UEFA Champions League, two appearances in the UEFA Europa League) | 0 | 0 | 0 | 11 | 1 |
| Astana | 2018 | Kazakhstan Premier League | 15 | 5 | 0 | 0 | 4 (Note: Two appearances, one goal in the UEFA Champions League, two appearances in the UEFA Europa League) | 1 | 1 | 0 | 20 | 6 |
| Astana | Total | | 53 | 14 | 4 | 3 | 19 | 3 | 2 | 0 | 78 | 20 |
| Tobol (loan) | 2017 | Kazakhstan Premier League | 16 | 3 | 1 | 0 | — | | — | | 17 | 3 |
| Orenburg | 2018–19 | Russian Premier League | 23 | 4 | 2 | 1 | — | | — | | 25 | 5 |
| Orenburg | 2019–20 | Russian Premier League | 20 | 8 | 2 | 1 | — | | — | | 22 | 9 |
| Orenburg | Total | | 43 | 12 | 4 | 2 | — | | — | | 47 | 14 |
| Rubin Kazan | 2020–21 | Russian Premier League | 26 | 14 | 0 | 0 | — | | — | | 26 | 14 |
| Rubin Kazan | 2021–22 | Russian Premier League | 9 | 1 | 0 | 0 | 1 (Note: Appearance in the UEFA Europa Conference League) | 0 | — | | 10 | 1 |
| Rubin Kazan | Total | | 35 | 15 | 0 | 0 | 1 | 0 | — | | 36 | 15 |
| Arsenal Tula | 2021–22 | Russian Premier League | 10 | 1 | 1 | 0 | — | | — | | 11 | 1 |
| Career total | | | 258 | 74 | 19 | 10 | 26 | 4 | 2 | 0 | 305 | 88 |

== Honours ==
Lokeren

- Belgian Cup: 2013–14

Kairat

- Kazakhstan Cup: 2015

Astana

- Kazakhstan Premier League: 2016, 2017
- Kazakhstan Cup: 2016
- Kazakhstan Super Cup: 2018
