= Aleksey Gerasimov (footballer) =

Russian footballer (born 1993)

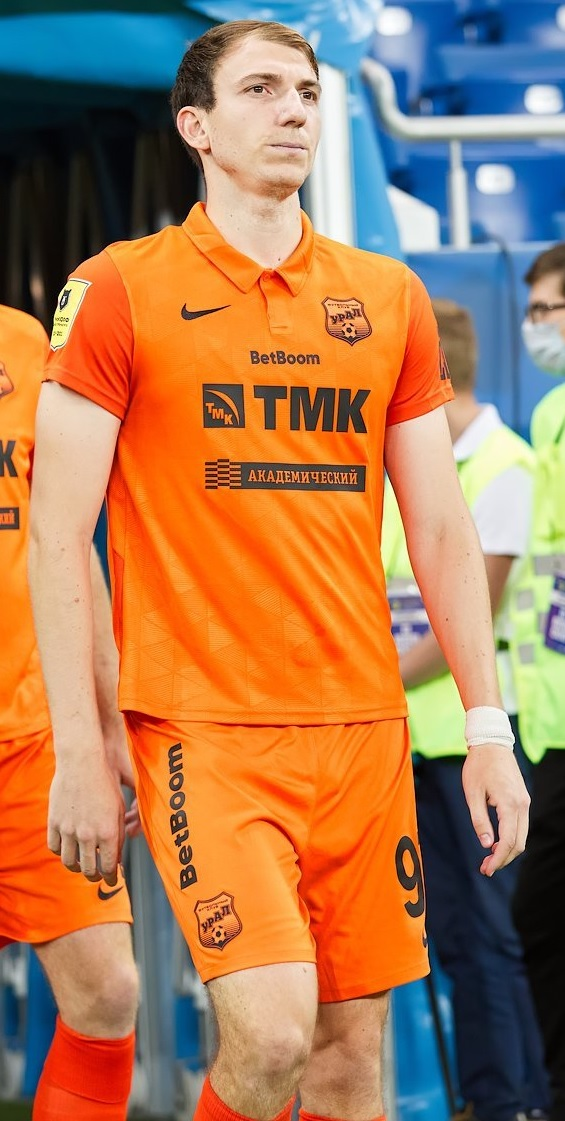
- Gerasimov with Ural in 2020

Personal information
- Full name: Aleksey Alekseyevich Gerasimov
- Date of birth: 15 April 1993 (age 33)
- Place of birth: Borisoglebsk, Russia
- Height: 1.91 m (6 ft 3 in)
- Position: Centre-back

Youth career
- 2008–2011: Tobol Kurgan
- 2011–2015: Ural Yekaterinburg

Senior career*
Years	Team	Apps	(Gls)
2010	Tobol Kurgan (amateur)		
2013–2024	Ural Yekaterinburg	55	(0)
2014	→ SKA-Energiya Khabarovsk (loan)	5	(0)
2015	→ Zhetysu (loan)	9	(0)
2016	→ Volga-Olimpiyets Nizhny Novgorod (loan)	0	(0)
2016	→ Belshina Bobruisk (loan)	14	(2)
2017	→ Tom Tomsk (loan)	13	(1)
2018–2020	→ Ural-2 Yekaterinburg	45	(5)
2023	→ KAMAZ Naberezhnye Chelny (loan)	12	(0)
2023–2024	→ Neftekhimik Nizhnekamsk (loan)	11	(0)
2024	→ Uralets-TS Nizhny Tagil (loan)	7	(1)
- * Club domestic league appearances and goals

Aleksey Alekseyevich Gerasimov (Russian: Алексей Алексеевич Герасимов; born 15 April 1993) is a Russian former football player who played as a centre-back.

== Career ==
He made his professional debut in the Russian Football National League for SKA-Energiya Khabarovsk on 24 August 2014 in a game against Sibir Novosibirsk.

In July 2015, Gerasimov, along with Elbeyi Guliyev, moved on loan to Kazakhstan Premier League side Zhetysu.

He made his Russian Premier League debut for Ural Yekaterinburg on 28 June 2020 in a game against Tambov, as a starter, seven years after he was first registered as Ural player.

On 11 January 2023, Gerasimov moved on loan to KAMAZ Naberezhnye Chelny until the end of the 2022–23 season. On 30 June 2023, Gerasimov was loaned to Neftekhimik Nizhnekamsk for the 2023–24 season.

== Career statistics ==
As of 21 May 2022

Club	Season	League			Cup		Continental		Other		Total	
Club	Season	Division	Apps	Goals	Apps	Goals	Apps	Goals	Apps	Goals	Apps	Goals
Ural Yekaterinburg	2013–14	Premier League	0	0	0	0	–		–		0	0
Ural Yekaterinburg	2014–15	Premier League	0	0	0	0	–		–		0	0
Ural Yekaterinburg	2018–19	Premier League	0	0	0	0	–		3 (Note: Appearances in the FNL Cup)	0	3	0
Ural Yekaterinburg	2019–20	Premier League	4	0	1	0	–		3	1	8	1
Ural Yekaterinburg	2020–21	Premier League	19	0	2	0	–		–		21	0
Ural Yekaterinburg	2021–22	Premier League	23	0	1	0	–		–		24	0
Ural Yekaterinburg	2022–23	Premier League	9	0	1	0	–		–		10	0
Ural Yekaterinburg	Total		55	0	5	0	0	0	6	1	66	1
SKA-Khabarovsk (loan)	2014–15	First League	5	0	1	0	–		–		6	0
Zhetysu (loan)	2015	Kazakhstan Premier League	9	0	–		–		1 (Note: Appearance in the relegation play-off)	0	10	0
Volga-Olimpiyets (loan)	2015–16	Second League	0	0	–		–		–		0	0
Belshina Bobruisk (loan)	2016	Belarusian Premier League	14	2	–		–		–		14	2
Tom Tomsk (loan)	2017–18	First League	13	1	1	0	–		–		14	1
Ural-2 Yekaterinburg	2017–18	Second League	8	1	–		–		–		8	1
Ural-2 Yekaterinburg	2018–19	Second League	23	2	–		–		–		23	2
Ural-2 Yekaterinburg	2019–20	Second League	14	2	–		–		–		14	2
Ural-2 Yekaterinburg	Total		45	5	0	0	0	0	0	0	45	5
Career total			141	8	7	0	0	0	7	1	155	9
