= Ivan Cvetković =

Serbian footballer

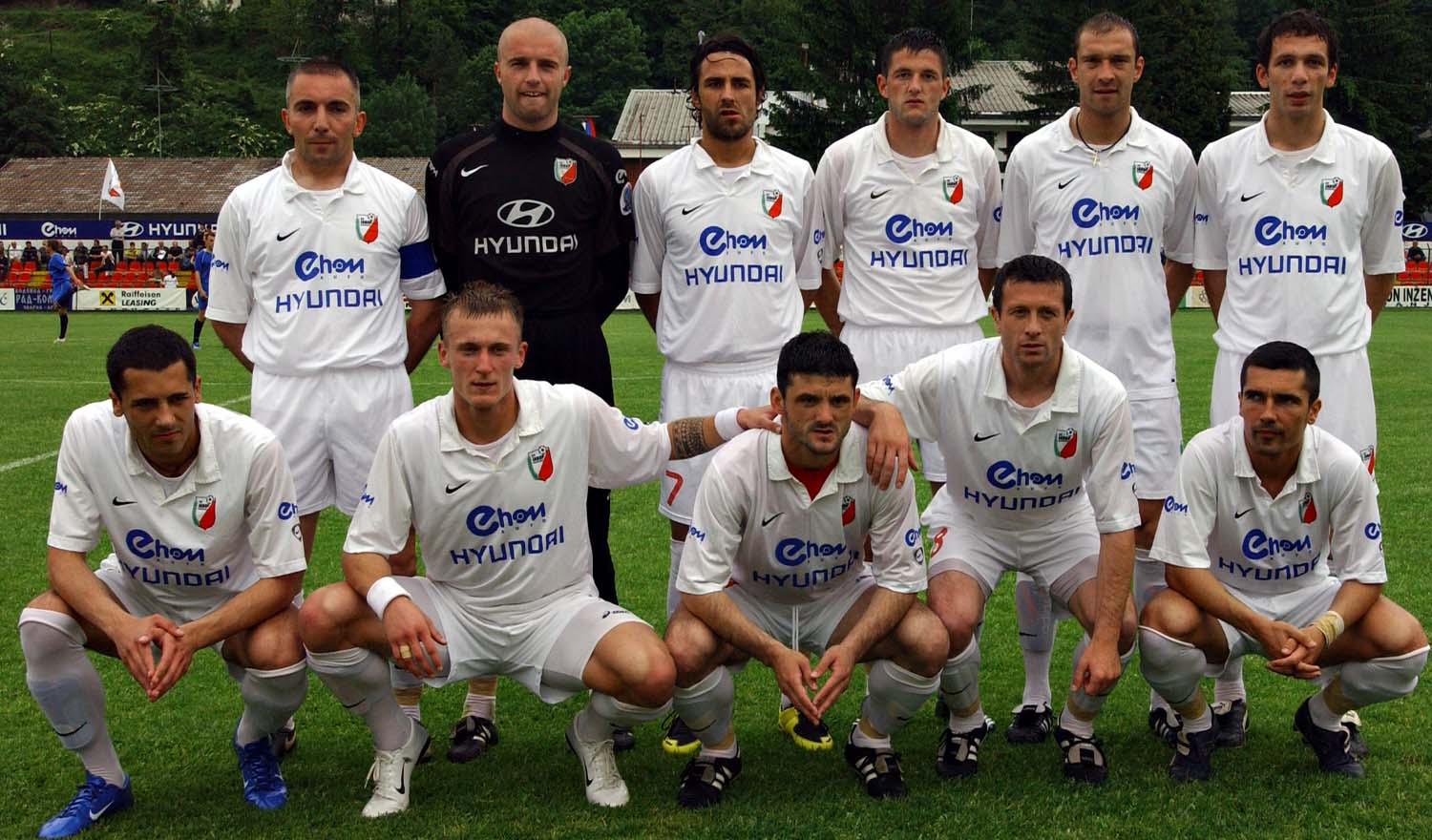
- Cvetković with Javor Ivanjica in 2008

Personal information
- Date of birth: 12 February 1981 (age 45)
- Place of birth: Prizren, SFR Yugoslavia
- Height: 1.77 m (5 ft 10 in)
- Position: Midfielder

Senior career*
Years	Team	Apps	(Gls)
2001–2002	Zvezdara	30	(0)
2002–2004	OFK Beograd	54	(3)
2005–2008	Javor Ivanjica	124	(8)
2009	Khimki	21	(2)
2010	Javor Ivanjica	14	(1)
2010–2012	Zhetysu	56	(3)
2012–2014	Jagodina	66	(4)
2015	Zhetysu	14	(0)
2015	Okzhetpes	13	(1)
2016	Jagodina	0	(0)
2016–2020	Javor Ivanjica	97	(12)

International career
2002	FR Yugoslavia U21	1	(0)
- * Club domestic league appearances and goals

Ivan Cvetković (Serbian Cyrillic: Иван Цветковић; born 12 February 1981) is a Serbian former professional footballer who played as midfielder.

== Club career ==
While playing for Zvezdara, Cvetković made his First League of FR Yugoslavia debuts in the 2001–02 campaign, the club's first season in the nation's top flight. He subsequently moved to OFK Beograd in the summer of 2002. During his first season with the Romantičari, Cvetković was a first-team regular, making 30 league appearances and scoring two goals.

In the 2005 winter transfer window, Cvetković switched to Javor Ivanjica. He was a regular member of the team that won the 2007–08 Serbian First League with an unbeaten record. In early 2009, Cvetković moved abroad for the first time and joined Russian side Khimki. He scored two goals in 21 games during the 2009 Russian Premier League, as the club suffered relegation.

After a short spell at Javor Ivanjica, Cvetković moved abroad again and signed with Kazakhstan Premier League club Zhetysu in the summer of 2010. He amassed 56 league appearances and scored three goals over the next two years. In August 2012, Cvetković returned to Serbia and joined Jagodina. He helped the club win the Serbian Cup in 2013, their first major trophy ever, and reach the final the very next year. In early 2015, Cvetković made a return to Kazakhstan and his former club Zhetysu. He also played for Okzhetpes in the second half of the year. In early 2016, Cvetković returned to Jagodina.

In the summer of 2016, Cvetković rejoined Javor Ivanjica. In June 2020, Cvetković finished his playing career, after Serbian SuperLiga game between Inđija and Javor.

== International career ==
At international level, Cvetković made one appearance for FR Yugoslavia U21, playing the first half of a 1–2 friendly loss away against Spain U21 in April 2002.

== Honours ==
Javor Ivanjica

- Serbian First League: 2007–08

Jagodina

- Serbian Cup: 2012–13; Runner-up 2013–14
