= Ruslan Galiakberov =

Russian footballer

Personal information
- Full name: Ruslan Albertovich Galiakberov
- Date of birth: 20 November 1989 (age 36)
- Place of birth: Kazan, Russian SFSR
- Height: 1.74 m (5 ft 9 in)
- Position: Striker

Youth career
- FC DYuSSh-Vakhitovskiy Kazan

Senior career*
Years	Team	Apps	(Gls)
2010–2012	FC Rubin-2 Kazan	69	(21)
2013	FC Neftekhimik Nizhnekamsk	8	(0)
2013	FC Zenit Penza	19	(3)
2014–2015	FC Rubin-2 Kazan	32	(14)
2014–2017	FC Rubin Kazan	0	(0)
2015	→ FC Zhetysu (loan)	13	(6)
2016–2017	→ FC Neftekhimik Nizhnekamsk (loan)	45	(8)
2017	FC Syzran-2003	11	(7)
2018	FC KAMAZ Naberezhnye Chelny	16	(10)
2019	FC Neftekhimik Nizhnekamsk	22	(1)
2020–2021	FC KAMAZ Naberezhnye Chelny	25	(15)
2021–2022	FC Novosibirsk	16	(3)

Managerial career
- 2023: FC KAMAZ Naberezhnye Chelny (assistant)
- * Club domestic league appearances and goals

Ruslan Albertovich Galiakberov (Tatar: Руслан Әлбирт улы Галиәкбәров, Russian: Руслан Альбертович Галиакберов; born 20 November 1989) is a Russian professional football coach and a former player.

== Club career ==
He made his Russian Football National League debut for FC Neftekhimik Nizhnekamsk on 1 April 2013 in a game against FC Khimki.

On 8 July 2015, Galiakberov joined Kazakhstan Premier League side FC Zhetysu on loan.
