= Ilsur Samigullin =

Russian footballer

Personal information
- Full name: Ilsur Gumerovich Samigullin
- Date of birth: 6 February 1991 (age 35)
- Place of birth: Nizhnekamsk, Russian SFSR
- Height: 1.78 m (5 ft 10 in)
- Position: Midfielder

Youth career
- Neftekhimik Nizhnekamsk
- 2007–2008: Rubin Kazan

Senior career*
Years	Team	Apps	(Gls)
2008–2016	Rubin Kazan	0	(0)
2011–2012	→ Neftekhimik Nizhnekamsk (loan)	30	(0)
2013–2014	→ Neftekhimik Nizhnekamsk (loan)	8	(0)
2014–2015	→ Rubin-2 Kazan	21	(0)
2015	→ Zhetysu (loan)	10	(0)
2016	→ Neftekhimik Nizhnekamsk (loan)	5	(1)
2016–2017	Syzran-2003	18	(0)
2017–2018	Zenit-Izhevsk	9	(0)
2019	Khujand	8	(0)
2019–2020	FC Yevpatoria		

International career
2009	Russia U-19	4	(1)
2011	Russia U-20	4	(0)
- * Club domestic league appearances and goals

Ilsur Gumerovich Samigullin (Tatar: Илсур Гомәр улы Сәмигуллин, Russian: Ильсур Гумерович Самигуллин; born 6 February 1991) is a Russian former football midfielder.

== Career ==
Samigullin made his professional debut for FC Rubin Kazan on 15 July 2009 in the Russian Cup game against FC Volga Tver.

In July 2015, Samigullin moved on loan to Kazakhstan Premier League side FC Zhetysu.
