= Anton Matveyenko (footballer, born 1986) =

Belarusian footballer

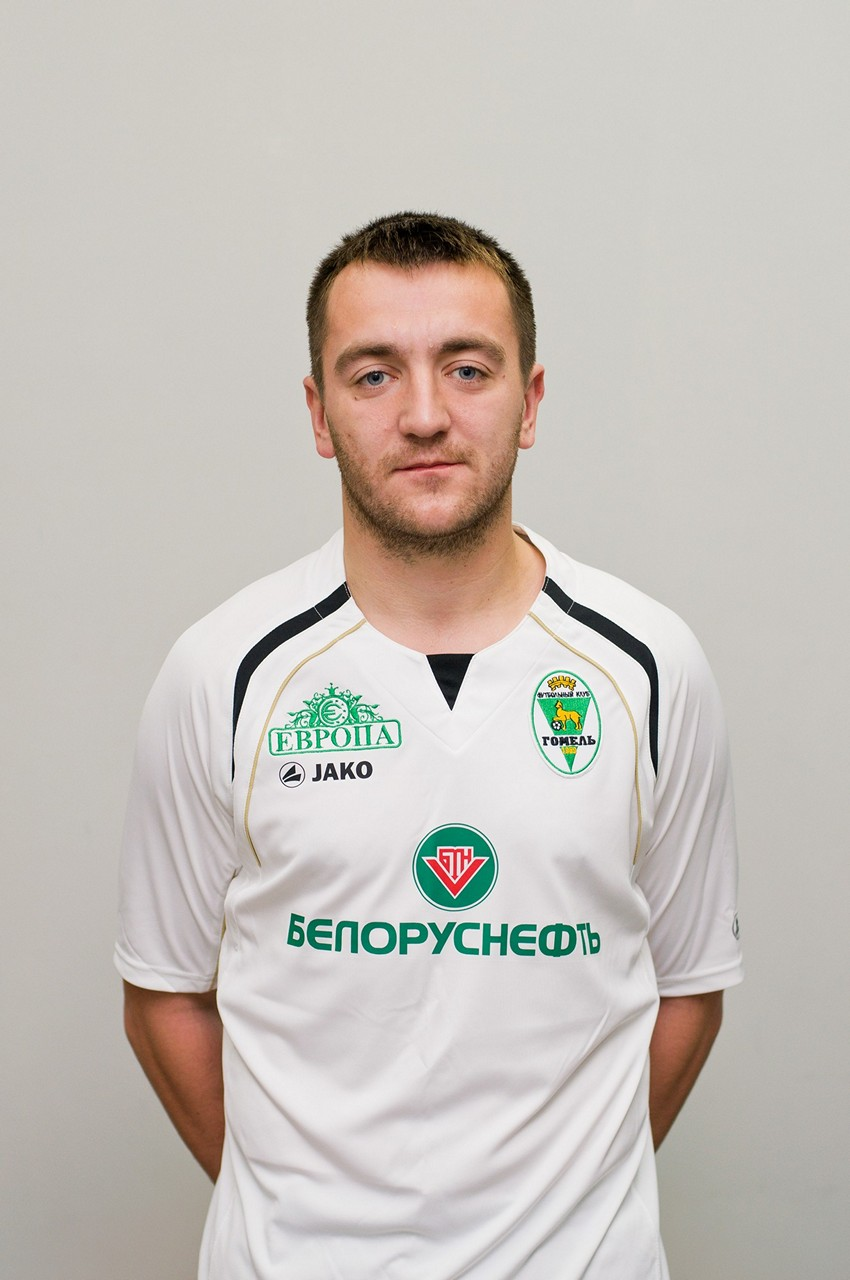

Personal information
- Full name: Anton Yevgenyevich Matveyenko
- Date of birth: 3 September 1986 (age 40)
- Place of birth: Mogilev, Belarusian SSR, Soviet Union
- Height: 1.79 m (5 ft 10 1/2 in)
- Position: Midfielder

Youth career
- 2003–2005: Dnepr Mogilev

Senior career*
Years	Team	Apps	(Gls)
2003–2009	Dnepr Mogilev	107	(10)
2010	Dinamo Minsk	10	(0)
2010	→ Dnepr Mogilev (loan)	12	(0)
2011–2012	Dnepr Mogilev	59	(20)
2013–2014	Gomel	53	(12)
2015	Torpedo-BelAZ Zhodino	11	(0)
2015	Kaisar	12	(0)
2016	Belshina Bobruisk	15	(3)
2016	Minsk	15	(2)
2017–2023	Vitebsk	191	(29)
- * Club domestic league appearances and goals

Anton Yevgenyevich Matveyenko (Belarusian: Антон Яўгенавіч Мацвеенка; Russian: Антон Евгеньевич Матвеенко; born 3 September 1986) is a Belarusian former professional footballer.
