= Elbeyi Guliyev =

Azerbaijani football player (born 1995)

Personal information
- Full name: Elbeyi Anar oglu Guliyev
- Date of birth: 14 October 1995 (age 31)
- Place of birth: Yekaterinburg, Russia
- Height: 1.84 m (6 ft 0 in)
- Position: Forward

Youth career
- 2001–2013: FC Ural Yekaterinburg

Senior career*
Years	Team	Apps	(Gls)
2013–2018	FC Ural Yekaterinburg	1	(0)
2015	→ FC Zhetysu (loan)	7	(1)
2017–2018	→ FC Ural-2 Yekaterinburg	19	(1)
2019	FC Irtysh Omsk	4	(2)

International career
2014–2016	Azerbaijan U21	2	(0)
- * Club domestic league appearances and goals

Elbeyi Guliyev (Azerbaijani: Elbəyi Anar oğlu Quliyev, Russian: Эльбейи Анарович Гулиев; born 14 October 1995) is an Azerbaijani former professional football player. He also holds Russian citizenship.

== Club career ==
=== Ural Sverdlovsk Oblast ===
Guliyev was a product of the Ural Sverdlovsk Oblast youth system.

He made his professional debut for Ural on 19 March 2016 in a Russian Premier League 1–1 away draw against Terek, coming on as a substitute in the second half.

=== Loan to Zhetysu ===
On July 8, 2015, Guliyev was loaned to Kazakh side Zhetysu.

He scored his first competitive goal for Zhetysu on 31 October 2015, in a 2–1 home victory against Kaisar.

== International career ==
He was called up Azerbaijan U21 in October 2014 for training camp in Frankfurt and in March 2015 for training camp in Baku.
