= 2016–17 FC Dynamo Moscow season =

Russian association football club season

Dynamo Moscow
2016–17 season
- Chairman: Sergei Sysoyev
- Manager: Yuriy Kalitvintsev
- Stadium: Arena Khimki
- Russian FNL: 1st (promoted)
- Russian Cup: Round of 16
- Top goalscorer: League: Kirill Panchenko (24); All: Kirill Panchenko (25)
- Highest home attendance: 7,375 v. Tyumen (20 May 2017)
- Lowest home attendance: 2,576 v. Mordovia Saransk (23 April 2017)
- Average home league attendance: 4,089 (10 May 2017)
Home colours	Away colours

The 2016–17 Dynamo Moscow season was the 94th season in the club's history and its first ever below the top level of Russian or Soviet football. They are currently participating in the Russian National Football League and the Russian Cup.

== Squad ==
As of 10 May 2017

Note: Flags indicate national team as defined under FIFA eligibility rules; some limited exceptions apply. Players may hold more than one non-FIFA nationality.

No.	Pos.	Nation	Player
1	GK	RUS	Anton Shunin
2	DF	RUS	Grigori Morozov
3	DF	SWE	Sebastian Holmén
4	DF	RUS	Vladimir Rykov
5	DF	RUS	Vitali Dyakov
8	FW	RUS	Kirill Panchenko
9	FW	RUS	Pavel Pogrebnyak
10	MF	RUS	Aleksandr Zotov
11	DF	RUS	Ivan Temnikov
12	DF	RUS	Dmitri Belorukov
13	DF	RUS	Sergei Terekhov
14	MF	RUS	Ivan Markelov
21	FW	MNE	Fatos Bećiraj
22	GK	RUS	Igor Leshchuk

No.	Pos.	Nation	Player
23	MF	RUS	Anton Sosnin
25	DF	RUS	Aleksei Kozlov
26	DF	RUS	Nikita Kalugin
29	DF	AUS	Luke Wilkshire
33	DF	RUS	Anton Ivanov
41	MF	RUS	Aleksandr Sapeta
42	GK	RUS	Sergei Narubin
48	FW	RUS	Yevgeni Lutsenko
77	MF	RUS	Anatoli Katrich
87	MF	RUS	Valeri Saramutin
88	MF	RUS	Aleksandr Tashayev
90	FW	RUS	Nikolay Obolsky
96	MF	RUS	Maksim Kuzmin
98	FW	RUS	Anton Terekhov

=== Out on loan ===
Note: Flags indicate national team as defined under FIFA eligibility rules; some limited exceptions apply. Players may hold more than one non-FIFA nationality.

No.	Pos.	Nation	Player
27	MF	RUS	Igor Denisov (at (Russia) Lokomotiv Moscow)
—	MF	RUS	Aleksei Ionov (at (Russia) CSKA Moscow)

No.	Pos.	Nation	Player
—	MF	RUS	Ilya Petrov (at (Russia) Mordovia Saransk)

=== Reserve squad ===
Note: Flags indicate national team as defined under FIFA eligibility rules; some limited exceptions apply. Players may hold more than one non-FIFA nationality.

No.	Pos.	Nation	Player
41	GK	RUS	Igor Leshchuk
43	GK	RUS	Stanislav Cherchesov Jr.
51	DF	RUS	Roman Yevgenyev
52	DF	RUS	Ilya Panin
54	MF	RUS	Ilya Gomanyuk
55	FW	RUS	Kirill Burykin
56	MF	RUS	Viktor Demyanov
57	MF	RUS	Denis Sedykh
58	FW	RUS	Semyon Belyakov
60	DF	RUS	Artyom Gorbulin
61	DF	RUS	Semyon Matviychuk
62	DF	RUS	Nikita Kalugin
63	MF	RUS	Pavel Lelyukhin
64	DF	RUS	Aleksandr Shchegolkov
66	MF	RUS	Anton Antonov
67	MF	RUS	Pavel Farafonov
69	MF	RUS	Nikita Kireyev
70	DF	RUS	Maksim Nenakhov

No.	Pos.	Nation	Player
71	DF	RUS	Roman Denisov
73	DF	RUS	Sergei Yevtushenko
74	DF	RUS	Nikita Klimov
75	MF	RUS	Mikhail Mogulkin
76	MF	RUS	Osman Isayev
78	FW	RUS	Stanislav Latsevich
81	GK	RUS	Pyotr Kosarevsky
82	GK	RUS	David Sangare
83	GK	RUS	Andrei Rebrikov
84	GK	RUS	Ivan Zirikov
85	MF	RUS	Nikita Kanavin
86	MF	RUS	Vyacheslav Grulyov
87	MF	RUS	Valeri Saramutin
91	DF	RUS	Aleksandr Stepanov
92	FW	RUS	Maksim Obolskiy
93	MF	RUS	Eduard Sholokh
96	DF	RUS	Aleksandr Zakharov
97	MF	RUS	Anton Altunin

== Competitions ==
=== Russian National Football League ===
==== Results by round ====
Round	1	2	3	4	5	6	7	8	9	10	11	12	13	14	15	16	17	18	19	20	21	22	23	24	25	26	27	28	29	30	31	32	33	34	35	36	37	38
Ground	H	A	H	H	A	H	A	H	A	H	A	H	H	A	H	A	A	H	A	H	A	A	H	A	H	A	H	A	H	A	H	A	H	A	H	A	H	A
Result	W	D	W	W	D	W	W	W	W	L	W	W	W	W	W	D	L	D	W	D	W	W	D	W	D	W	D	W	W	W	D	W	W	W	L	W	W	W
Position	1	3	2	1	1	1	1	1	1	1	1	1	1	1	1	1	1	1	1	1	1	1	1	1	1	1	1	1	1	1	1	1	1	1	1	1	1	1

Updated to match(es) played on 20 May 2017. Source: Russian National Football League
A = Away; H = Home; W = Win; D = Draw; L = Loss

==== Matches ====
11 July 2016 1	Dynamo Moscow	3 – 0	Tyumen	Khimki
19:30 MSK (UTC+3)	Temnikov 22'; Panchenko 57', 61'; A. Terekhov (yellow card) 81'; Sapeta (yellow card) 90'	Report	Leshonok (yellow card) 22'	Stadium: Arena Khimki; Attendance: 5,000; Referee: Vladimir Moskalyov

16 July 2016 2	Yenisey	0 – 0	Dynamo Moscow	Krasnoyarsk
12:00 MSK (UTC+3)	Chicherin (yellow card) 23'; Geloyan (yellow card) 90+2'	Report	Morozov (yellow card) 34'; Bećiraj (yellow card) 70'	Stadium: Central Stadium; Attendance: 6,000; Referee: Aleksandr Yegorov

23 July 2016 3	Dynamo Moscow	3 – 1	Neftekhimik	Khimki
16:00	Morozov 6'; Sapeta (yellow card) 50'; Tashayev 60'; Panchenko 67'	Report	Kornilov (yellow card) 20'; Gagloyev 64' (pen.); Zamaliyev (yellow card) 65'	Stadium: Arena Khimki; Attendance: 4,500; Referee: Vladislav Bezborodov

27 July 2016 4	Dynamo Moscow	2 – 1	Baltika	Khimki
19:30	Panchenko 38', 82'	Report	Kalenkovich (yellow card) 33'; Zimulka (yellow card) 39'; Pochivalin 45+2'	Stadium: Arena Khimki; Attendance: 4,417; Referee: Sergei Kulikov

31 July 2016 5	Zenit-2 St. Petersburg	1 – 1	Dynamo Moscow	Saint Petersburg
14:00	Pronichev (yellow card) 5'; Gasilin 40'; Mustafin (yellow card) 90+2'	Report	Bećiraj 18'; Morozov (yellow card) 45+1' (yellow-red card) 75'; Kuzmin (yellow card) 85'; Tashayev (yellow card) 90+2'	Stadium: MSA Petrovsky; Attendance: 3,000; Referee: Vladimir Seldyakov

6 August 2016 6	Dynamo Moscow	5 – 0	Volgar Astrakhan	Khimki
19:00	Bećiraj 45'; Kuzmin 60'; Panchenko 71'; Zotov 74'; Temnikov 88'	Report	3,985	Stadium: Arena Khimki; Referee: Roman Galimov

13 August 2016 7	Spartak Nalchik	0 – 1	Dynamo Moscow	Nalchik
18:30		Report	Belorukov (yellow card) 31'; Katrich 86'	Stadium: Spartak Stadium; Attendance: 6,000; Referee: Artyom Chistyakov

17 August 2016 8	Dynamo Moscow	3 – 2	Luch-Energiya	Khimki
19:00	S. Terekhov 55', (yellow card) 77'; Temnikov 85', (yellow card) 87'; Zotov 90+1'	Report	Popov (yellow card) 30'; Gritsayenko 78'; Hawrylaw (yellow card) 87'; S. Terekhov 89' (o.g.)	Stadium: Arena Khimki; Attendance: 3,824; Referee: Nikolay Voloshin

22 August 2016 9	Spartak-2 Moscow	1 – 2	Dynamo Moscow	Khimki
18:00	Khomukha (yellow card) 5'; Granat 22'; Samsonov (yellow card) 35'	Report	Panchenko 42'; Sapeta 52', (yellow card) 81'	Stadium: Arena Khimki; Attendance: 7,162; Referee: Yevgeni Turbin

28 August 2016 10	Dynamo Moscow	0 – 1	Tosno	Khimki
16:00	Panchenko (yellow card) 18'; Rykov (yellow card) 45+3'; Morozov (yellow card) 64'	Report	Kašćelan (yellow card) 11', (goal) 78'; Makarov (yellow card) 15'	Stadium: Arena Khimki; Attendance: 4,779; Referee: Vitaliy Meshkov

3 September 2016 11	Tambov	1 – 2	Dynamo Moscow	Tambov
15:00	Poyarkov 43' (pen.); Rybin (yellow card) 73'	Report	Panchenko 4', 26'; Morozov (yellow card) 20'; Belorukov (yellow card) 60'; Zotov (yellow card) 63'; Shunin (yellow card) 65'	Stadium: Spartak Stadium; Attendance: 5,000; Referee: Vladimir Moskalyov

10 September 2016 12	Dynamo Moscow	3 – 2	SKA-Khabarovsk	Khimki
16:00	Panchenko 6', 36'; Bećiraj 21' (pen.); Tashayev (yellow card) 65'; Wilkshire (yellow card) 81'	Report	Udaliy 12'; Ediyev 16', (yellow card) 60'; Koryan (yellow card) 73'; Ivanov (yellow card) 76'; Mikuckis (yellow card) 84'	Stadium: Arena Khimki; Attendance: 3,362; Referee: Sergey Ivanov

26 September 2016 14	Dynamo Moscow	1 – 0	Sibir	Khimki
19:30	Belorukov 52'	Report	Makarenko (yellow card) 48'; Magal (yellow card) 61'	Stadium: Arena Khimki; Attendance: 2,655; Referee: Denis Shpilyov

2 October 2016 15	Mordovia Saransk	0 – 1	Dynamo Moscow	Saransk
18:00	Ignatovich (yellow card) 24'; Sarkisov (yellow card) 39'; Ambartsumyan (yellow card) 52'; Bagayev (yellow card) 58'; Lebedev (yellow card) 70' (yellow-red card) 90'	Report	Wilkshire (yellow card) 6' (yellow-red card) 32'; Markelov 10'; Terekhov (yellow card) 14'	Stadium: Start Stadium; Attendance: 2,022; Referee: Lasha Verulidze

8 October 2016 16	Dynamo Moscow	1 – 0	Kuban Krasnodar	Khimki
16:00	Markelov (yellow card) 8', (goal) 44'; Rykov (yellow card) 26'; Sosnin (yellow card) 33'	Report	Shchadin (yellow card) 55'; Smirnov (yellow card) 67'; Bendz (yellow card) 84'	Stadium: Arena Khimki; Attendance: 3,591; Referee: Artyom Chistyakov

12 October 2016 13	Khimki	0 – 0	Dynamo Moscow	Khimki
18:30		Report	Lapin (yellow card) 20'; Galešić (yellow card) 49'; Yarkovoy (yellow card) 52'; Shumskikh (yellow card) 82'	Stadium: Rodina Stadium; Attendance: 2,500; Referee: Sergei Kulikov
Note: Match originally scheduled to be played on 17 September 2017 but was postponed.

15 October 2016 17	Fakel	2 – 1	Dynamo Moscow	Voronezh
18:00	Biryukov 30'; Shakhov 71'	Report	Panchenko 8'; Rykov (yellow card) 24'; Zotov (yellow card) 57'; Bećiraj (yellow card) 68'; Markelov (yellow card) 86'	Stadium: Trade Unions Central Stadium; Attendance: 12,900; Referee: Aleksandr Yegorov

22 October 2016 18	Dynamo Moscow	1 – 1	Sokol	Khimki
16:00	Panchenko 79'	Report	Perchenok (yellow card) 71'; Klimov 90'	Stadium: Arena Khimki; Attendance: 3,146; Referee: Andrei Fisenko

30 October 2016 19	Shinnik	2 – 3	Dynamo Moscow	Yaroslavl
16:00	Sirotov 69'; Zemskov 72'; Chistyakov (yellow card) 90+3'	Report	Temnikov 29', (yellow card) 90+2'; Panchenko 40', 74'; Sosnin (yellow card) 77'	Stadium: Shinnik Stadium; Attendance: 4,000; Referee: Roman Galimov

5 November 2016 20	Dynamo Moscow	2 – 2	Yenisey	Khimki
14:00	Temnikov 12', 44', (yellow card) 41'	Report	Chicherin (yellow card) 21'; Gultyaev 31', 51', (yellow card) 42'; Nivaldo (yellow card) 90+3'	Stadium: Arena Khimki; Attendance: 2,758; Referee: Aleksei Sukhoi

9 November 2016 21	Neftekhimik	0 – 1	Dynamo Moscow	Nizhnekamsk
14:00	Mullin (yellow card) 61'; Zamaliyev (yellow card) 83'; Samokhvalov (red card) 89'	Report	Lutsenko 9' (pen.); Temnikov (yellow card) 56'; Katrich (yellow card) 90+1'	Stadium: Neftekhimik Stadium; Attendance: 1,000; Referee: Pavel Kukuyan

13 November 2016 22	Baltika	0 – 3	Dynamo Moscow	Kaliningrad
18:00	Kryuchkov (yellow card) 29'; Podbeltsev (yellow card) 61'	Report	Rykov 13'; Lutsenko 27', 69'; Drahun (yellow card) 82'; Holmén (yellow card) 86'	Stadium: Baltika Stadium; Attendance: 3,900; Referee: Aleksei Lebedev

19 November 2016 23	Dynamo Moscow	0 – 0	Zenit-2 St. Petersburg	Khimki
14:00	Zotov (yellow card) 58'; Sapeta (yellow card) 90+4'	Report	Pronichev (yellow card) 23'; Isayev (yellow card) 73'; Baburin (yellow card) 90+2'	Stadium: Arena Khimki; Attendance: 3,546; Referee: Oleg Sokolov

26 November 2016 24	Volgar	0 – 1	Dynamo Moscow	Astrakhan
18:00	Zuykov (yellow card) 16'; Bolonin (yellow card) 45'; Kabutov (yellow card) 45'; Dyshekov (yellow card) 87'	Report	Bećiraj 79'	Stadium: Central Stadium; Attendance: 1,400; Referee: Igor Panin

8 March 2017 25	Dynamo Moscow	1 – 1	Spartak Nalchik	Khimki
14:00	Sapeta (yellow card) 53', (goal) 72'; Rykov (yellow card) 56'; Markelov (yellow card) 84'	Report	Makoyev (yellow card) 44'; Voynov 71'	Stadium: Arena Khimki; Attendance: 3,786; Referee: Anton Anopa

12 March 2017 26	Luch-Energiya	0 – 2	Dynamo Moscow	Khimki
10:00	Piskunov (yellow card) 38'	Report	Lutsenko 40'; Temnikov (yellow card) 45'; Panchenko 90+1' (pen.)	Stadium: Arena Khimki; Attendance: 2,074; Referee: Sergei Ivanov

19 March 2017 27	Spartak-2 Moscow	1 – 1	Dinamo Moscow	Moscow
16:00	Kutin (yellow card) 27' (yellow-red card); Melkadze (yellow card) 85' (goal) 90+1'; Davydov (yellow card) 90+4'	Report	Sapeta 53'; Temnikov (yellow card) 67'; Bećiraj (yellow card) 89'; Morozov (yellow card) 90+4'	Stadium: Otkrytiye Arena; Attendance: 10,355; Referee: Aleksei Sukhoi

26 March 2017 28	Tosno	1 – 2	Dynamo Moscow	Veliky Novgorod
16:00	Paliyenko 35'; Garbuz (yellow card) 65'; Chirkin (yellow card) 71'; Buivolov (yellow card) 83'	Report	Panchenko 66', 69'; Temnikov (yellow card) 90+1'	Stadium: Stadion im. Aleksandra Nevskogo; Attendance: 2,900; Referee: Vladimir Seldyakov

1 April 2017 29	Dynamo Moscow	3 – 0	Tambov	Khimki
15:00	Belorukov 23'; Lutsenko 44'; Katrich 48'	Report		Stadium: Arena Khimki; Attendance: 3,031; Referee: Vladislav Bezborodov

8 April 2017 30	SKA-Khabarovsk	2 – 3	Dynamo Moscow	Khabarovsk
08:00	Lescano 12'; Kalinsky (yellow card) 65'; Koryan 88'; Kobyalko (yellow card) 89'	Report	Panchenko 24', 31', 43'; Sosnin (yellow card) 59'; Markelov (yellow card) 60'	Stadium: Lenin Stadium; Attendance: 4,000; Referee: Mikhail Vilkov

12 April 2017 31	Dynamo Moscow	0 – 0	Khimki	Khimki
19:30	Morozov (yellow card) 41'	Report	Lapin (yellow card) 31'; Kokoyev (yellow card) 42'; Kazayev (yellow card) 78'	Stadium: Arena Khimki; Attendance: 3,847; Referee: Aleksandr Borisov

17 April 2017 32	Sibir	1 – 3	Dynamo Moscow	Novosibirsk
16:00	Cebotaru 3'; Mishchenko (yellow card) 52'; Belyayev (yellow card) 63'	Report	Lutsenko 21'; Morozov (yellow card) 40'; Bećiraj 67'; Zotov 75'	Stadium: Spartak Stadium; Attendance: 2,200; Referee: Oleg Sokolov

23 April 2017 33	Dynamo Moscow	2 – 1	Mordovia Saransk	Khimki
16:00	Panchenko 13'; Bećiraj 52'; Sosnin (yellow card) 70'	Report	Sabitov (yellow card) 30'; Osipov 40'; Bagayev (yellow card) 62'	Stadium: Arena Khimki; Attendance: 2,576; Referee: Stanislav Vasilyev

29 April 2017 34	Kuban Krasnodar	0 – 1	Dynamo Moscow	Krasnodar
17:00	Yakuba (yellow card) 37'	Report	Panchenko (yellow card) 56'; Rykov (yellow card) 60'; Temnikov 90+1'	Stadium: Kuban Stadium; Attendance: 6,211; Referee: Nikolai Voloshin

6 May 2017 35	Dynamo Moscow	0 – 1	Fakel	Khimki
16:00	Sosnin (yellow card) 47'; Sapeta (yellow card) 90+3'	Report	Bagayev (yellow card) 36'; Osipenko (yellow card) 68'; Kasyan 79'	Stadium: Arena Khimki; Attendance: 4,342; Referee: Roman Galimov

10 May 2017 36	Sokol	0 – 3	Dynamo Moscow	Saratov
19:00		Report	Panchenko 71', 90+3'; Bećiraj 74'	Stadium: Lokomotiv Stadium; Attendance: 2,300; Referee: Aleksandr Borisov

14 May 2017 37	Dynamo Moscow	1 – 0	Shinnik	Khimki
16:00	Chistyakov 25' (o.g.); Sosnin (yellow card) 29'; Temnikov (yellow card) 78'	Report	Mitasov (yellow card) 24'; Gotsuk (yellow card) 29'; Troyanov (yellow card) 50'; Podolyak (yellow card) 83'; Tskhovrebov (yellow card) 90+2'	Stadium: Arena Khimki; Attendance: 7,375; Referee: Anton Sokolov

20 May 2017 38	Tyumen	0 – 2	Dynamo Moscow	Tyumen
13:00	Guz (yellow card) 26'	Report	Bećiraj 2', 4'; Sapeta (yellow card) 24'; Sosnin (yellow card) 89'	Stadium: Geolog Stadium; Attendance: 2,500; Referee: Yevgeni Kukulyak

=== Russian Cup ===
25 August 2016 Fourth Round	Baltika	1 – 3 (a.e.t.)	Dynamo Moscow	Kaliningrad
20:00	Yeliseyev (yellow card) 40', (goal) 50'; Marushchak (yellow card) 51'	Report	Lutsenko 43'; Kuzmin (yellow card) 99', (goal) 120'; Holmén 108'; Sapeta (yellow card) 115'	Stadium: Baltika Stadium; Attendance: 7,300; Referee: Denis Shpilev

21 September 2016 Round of 32	Dynamo Moscow	4 – 0	Rostov	Khimki
14:00	Rykov 6'; Gueye 18' (o.g.); Markelov 45'; Temnikov 90+2'	Report	Khodunov (yellow card) 5'; Ezatolahi (yellow card) 58'	Stadium: Arena Khimki; Attendance: 3,473; Referee: Vladimir Seldyakov

26 October 2016 Round of 16	Tosno	3 - 2	Dynamo Moscow	Veliky Novgorod
19:00	Dugalić (yellow card) 5'; Galiulin 22'; Kašćelan (yellow card) 38'; Mukhametshin 45+2'; Kutyin (yellow card) 69'; Nigmatullin (yellow card) 80'; Kireyenko 88'	Report	Panchenko 54'; Bećiraj 85'	Stadium: Stadion im. Aleksandra Nevskogo; Attendance: 2,750; Referee: Mikhail Vilkov

== Squad statistics ==
As of match played 20 May 2017

=== Appearances and goals ===
No.	Pos	Nat	Player	Total		Russian FNL		Russian Cup	
No.	Pos	Nat	Player	Apps	Goals	Apps	Goals	Apps	Goals
1	GK	(Russia) RUS	Anton Shunin	35	0	35	0	0	0
2	DF	(Russia) RUS	Grigori Morozov	32	1	26+4	1	2	0
3	DF	(Sweden) SWE	Sebastian Holmén	36	1	33	0	3	1
4	DF	(Russia) RUS	Vladimir Rykov	26	2	21+2	1	3	1
5	DF	(Russia) RUS	Vitali Dyakov	3	0	0	0	3	0
8	FW	(Russia) RUS	Kirill Panchenko	37	25	34	24	2+1	1
9	FW	(Russia) RUS	Pavel Pogrebnyak	9	0	2+6	0	0+1	0
10	MF	(Russia) RUS	Aleksandr Zotov	33	3	29+1	3	2+1	0
11	DF	(Russia) RUS	Ivan Temnikov	33	8	23+8	7	1+1	1
12	DF	(Russia) RUS	Dmitri Belorukov	24	2	23+1	2	0	0
13	MF	(Russia) RUS	Sergei Terekhov	26	1	23+1	1	2	0
14	MF	(Russia) RUS	Ivan Markelov	14	3	5+8	2	1	1
21	FW	(Montenegro) MNE	Fatos Bećiraj	33	10	22+8	9	1+2	1
22	GK	(Russia) RUS	Igor Leshchuk	1	0	1	0	0	0
23	MF	(Russia) RUS	Anton Sosnin	18	0	12+6	0	0	0
25	DF	(Russia) RUS	Aleksei Kozlov	17	0	15+1	0	0+1	0
26	DF	(Russia) RUS	Nikita Kalugin	7	0	5+2	0	0	0
29	DF	(Australia) AUS	Luke Wilkshire	7	0	5+1	0	1	0
41	MF	(Russia) RUS	Aleksandr Sapeta	36	3	30+3	3	2+1	0
42	GK	(Russia) RUS	Sergei Narubin	5	0	2	0	3	0
48	FW	(Russia) RUS	Yevgeni Lutsenko	32	7	16+14	6	2	1
77	MF	(Russia) RUS	Anatoli Katrich	33	2	21+10	2	2	0
87	MF	(Russia) RUS	Valeri Saramutin	1	0	0+1	0	0	0
88	MF	(Russia) RUS	Aleksandr Tashayev	24	1	21+2	1	1	0
90	FW	(Russia) RUS	Nikolai Obolski	1	0	1	0	0	0
96	MF	(Russia) RUS	Maksim Kuzmin	26	2	7+17	1	1+1	1
98	FW	(Russia) RUS	Anton Terekhov	4	0	0+3	0	1	0
Players away from the club on loan:
27	MF	(Russia) RUS	Igor Denisov	3	0	1+1	0	1	0
Players who appeared for Dynamo Moscow but left during the season:
7	MF	(Belarus) BLR	Stanislaw Drahun	13	0	3+9	0	1	0
18	MF	(Russia) RUS	Vladislav Lyovin	2	0	0+2	0	0	0
24	DF	(Netherlands) NED	Alexander Büttner	5	0	2+2	0	1	0

=== Goal scorers ===
Place	Position	Nation	Number	Name	Russian FNL	Russian Cup	Total
1	FW	(Russia)	8	Kirill Panchenko	24	1	25
2	FW	(Montenegro)	21	Fatos Bećiraj	9	1	10
3	DF	(Russia)	11	Ivan Temnikov	7	1	8
4	FW	(Russia)	48	Yevgeni Lutsenko	6	1	7
5	MF	(Russia)	10	Aleksandr Zotov	3	0	3
5	MF	(Russia)	41	Aleksandr Sapeta	3	0	3
5	MF	(Russia)	14	Ivan Markelov	2	1	3
8	DF	(Russia)	12	Dmitri Belorukov	2	0	2
8	MF	(Russia)	77	Anatoli Katrich	2	0	2
8	DF	(Russia)	4	Vladimir Rykov	1	1	2
8	MF	(Russia)	96	Maksim Kuzmin	1	1	2
12	DF	(Russia)	2	Grigori Morozov	1	0	1
12	DF	(Russia)	13	Sergei Terekhov	1	0	1
12	MF	(Russia)	88	Aleksandr Tashayev	1	0	1
12	DF	(Sweden)	3	Sebastian Holmén	0	1	1
Own goal					1	1	2
				TOTALS	64	9	73

=== Disciplinary record ===
Number	Nation	Position	Name	Russian FNL		Russian Cup		Total	
Number	Nation	Position	Name	Yellow card	Red card	Yellow card	Red card	Yellow card	Red card
1	(Russia)	GK	Anton Shunin	1	0	0	0	1	0
2	(Russia)	DF	Grigori Morozov	8	1	0	0	8	1
3	(Sweden)	DF	Sebastian Holmén	1	0	0	0	1	0
4	(Russia)	DF	Vladimir Rykov	6	0	0	0	6	0
8	(Russia)	FW	Kirill Panchenko	2	0	0	0	2	0
10	(Russia)	MF	Aleksandr Zotov	4	0	0	0	4	0
11	(Russia)	DF	Ivan Temnikov	8	0	0	0	8	0
12	(Russia)	DF	Dmitri Belorukov	2	0	0	0	2	0
13	(Russia)	DF	Sergei Terekhov	2	0	0	0	2	0
14	(Russia)	MF	Ivan Markelov	4	0	0	0	4	0
21	(Montenegro)	FW	Fatos Bećiraj	2	0	0	0	2	0
23	(Russia)	MF	Anton Sosnin	5	0	0	0	5	0
29	(Australia)	DF	Luke Wilkshire	2	1	0	0	2	1
41	(Russia)	MF	Aleksandr Sapeta	8	0	1	0	9	0
77	(Russia)	MF	Anatoli Katrich	1	0	0	0	1	0
88	(Russia)	MF	Aleksandr Tashayev	2	0	0	0	2	0
96	(Russia)	MF	Maksim Kuzmin	1	0	1	0	2	0
98	(Russia)	FW	Anton Terekhov	1	0	0	0	1	0
			TOTALS	60	2	2	0	62	2
