= 2017–18 FC Dynamo Moscow season =

Dinamo Moscow
2017–18 season
- Chairman: Yevgeni Muravyov
- Manager: Yuriy Kalitvintsev (until 7 October); Dmitri Khokhlov (from 7 October)
- Stadium: Arena Khimki
- Russian Premier League: 8th
- Russian Cup: Round of 32
- Top goalscorer: League: Aleksandr Tashayev (7); All: Aleksandr Tashayev (7)
Home colours	Away colours

The 2017–18 Dinamo Moscow season was the club's first season back in the Russian Premier League, following their relegation at the end of the 2015–16 season. Dynamo finished the season in 8th place, whilst being knocked out of the Russian Cup by Spartak Nalchik.

== Season events ==
On 7 October, manager Yuriy Kalitvintsev left Dynamo Moscow by Mutual consent, with Dmitri Khokhlov being appointed as Kalitvintsev's successor.

== Squad ==
As of 22 January 2018, according to the FNL official website Note: Flags indicate national team as defined under FIFA eligibility rules; some limited exceptions apply. Players may hold more than one non-FIFA nationality.

No.	Pos.	Nation	Player
1	GK	RUS	Anton Shunin
2	DF	RUS	Grigori Morozov
3	DF	SWE	Sebastian Holmén
4	DF	RUS	Vladimir Rykov
5	MF	GHA	Abdul Aziz Tetteh
7	FW	RUS	Yevgeni Markov
8	FW	RUS	Kirill Panchenko
10	MF	RUS	Aleksandr Zotov
11	MF	RUS	Ivan Temnikov
13	FW	LTU	Fiodor Černych
15	DF	RUS	Ibragim Tsallagov (on loan from Zenit St.Petersburg)
17	FW	RUS	Anton Terekhov

No.	Pos.	Nation	Player
20	MF	RUS	Vyacheslav Grulyov
23	MF	RUS	Anton Sosnin
25	DF	RUS	Aleksei Kozlov
26	DF	RUS	Nikita Kalugin
27	MF	MLI	Samba Sow
31	GK	RUS	Igor Leshchuk
34	DF	RUS	Konstantin Rausch
44	DF	BIH	Toni Šunjić
48	FW	RUS	Yevgeni Lutsenko
77	MF	RUS	Anatoli Katrich
88	MF	RUS	Aleksandr Tashayev
90	FW	RUS	Nikolay Obolsky

=== Out on loan ===
Note: Flags indicate national team as defined under FIFA eligibility rules; some limited exceptions apply. Players may hold more than one non-FIFA nationality.

No.	Pos.	Nation	Player
—	DF	RUS	Dmitri Belorukov (on loan to Amkar Perm)
—	DF	RUS	Maksim Nenakhov (on loan to Tyumen)
—	MF	RUS	Maksim Kuzmin (on loan to Fakel Voronezh)

No.	Pos.	Nation	Player
—	MF	RUS	Pavel Lelyukhin (on loan to Spartak-2 Moscow)
—	MF	RUS	Mikhail Mogulkin (on loan to Veles Moscow)

== Transfers ==
=== Summer ===
In: Note: Flags indicate national team as defined under FIFA eligibility rules; some limited exceptions apply. Players may hold more than one non-FIFA nationality.

No.	Pos.	Nation	Player
6	MF	SEN	Khaly Thiam (on loan from (Hungary) MTK Budapest)
7	MF	RUS	Aleksei Ionov (end of loan to (Russia) CSKA Moscow)
8	FW	RUS	Kirill Panchenko (from (Russia) CSKA Moscow, previously on loan)
14	FW	BRA	Wánderson (from (Russia) Krasnodar)
15	DF	RUS	Ibragim Tsallagov (on loan from (Russia) Zenit St. Petersburg)
16	GK	RUS	Ivan Zirikov (from (Russia) Dynamo-2 Moscow)
20	MF	RUS	Vyacheslav Grulyov (from (Russia) Dynamo-2 Moscow)
22	DF	RUS	Maksim Nenakhov (from (Russia) Dynamo-2 Moscow)
24	DF	RUS	Roman Yevgenyev (from (Russia) Dynamo-2 Moscow)
27	MF	MLI	Samba Sow (from (Turkey) Kayserispor)
35	GK	RUS	Pyotr Kosarevsky (from (Russia) Dynamo-2 Moscow)
44	DF	BIH	Toni Šunjić (from (Germany) Stuttgart)
52	DF	RUS	Ilya Panin (from (Russia) Dynamo-2 Moscow)
53	GK	RUS	Maksim Afanasyev
54	DF	RUS	Ilya Kalachyov
55	FW	RUS	Kirill Burykin (from (Russia) Dynamo-2 Moscow)
56	MF	RUS	Viktor Demyanov (from (Russia) Dynamo-2 Moscow)
57	MF	RUS	Ilya Gomanyuk
59	DF	RUS	Daniil Yermolin
61	GK	RUS	David Sangare
62	DF	RUS	Bogdan Zorin
63	FW	RUS	Mikhail Ageyev
65	MF	RUS	Vladimir Moskvichyov
67	DF	RUS	Stanislav Tses
68	MF	RUS	Georgi Chelidze
69	FW	RUS	Semyon Belyakov
71	DF	RUS	Roman Denisov
78	DF	RUS	Danil Lipovoy (from (Russia) Dynamo-2 Moscow)
79	MF	RUS	Sergei Slepov (from (Russia) Dynamo-2 Moscow)
92	FW	RUS	Maksim Obolsky
99	FW	RUS	Stanislav Latsevich (from (Russia) Dynamo-2 Moscow)
—	DF	RUS	Artyom Gorbulin (from (Russia) Dynamo-2 Moscow)
—	MF	RUS	Pavel Lelyukhin (from (Russia) Dynamo-2 Moscow)

Out: Note: Flags indicate national team as defined under FIFA eligibility rules; some limited exceptions apply. Players may hold more than one non-FIFA nationality.

No.	Pos.	Nation	Player
5	DF	RUS	Vitali Dyakov (to (Turkey) Sivasspor)
7	MF	RUS	Aleksei Ionov (to (Russia) Rostov)
12	DF	RUS	Dmitri Belorukov (on loan to (Russia) Amkar Perm)
14	MF	RUS	Ivan Markelov (to (Russia) Anzhi Makhachkala)
29	DF	AUS	Luke Wilkshire (to (Australia) Sydney)
43	GK	RUS	Stanislav Cherchesov Jr. (to (Russia) Chernomorets Novorossiysk)
87	MF	RUS	Valeri Saramutin (to (Russia) Dynamo St. Petersburg)
—	MF	RUS	Igor Denisov (to (Russia) Lokomotiv Moscow, previously on loan)
—	MF	RUS	Ilya Petrov (on loan to (Russia) Avangard Kursk, previously on loan to (Russia) Mordovia Saransk)

=== Winter ===
In: Note: Flags indicate national team as defined under FIFA eligibility rules; some limited exceptions apply. Players may hold more than one non-FIFA nationality.

No.	Pos.	Nation	Player
5	MF	GHA	Abdul Aziz Tetteh (from (Poland) Lech Poznań)
7	FW	RUS	Yevgeni Markov (from (Russia) Tosno)
13	FW	LTU	Fiodor Černych (from (Poland) Jagiellonia Białystok)
34	DF	RUS	Konstantin Rausch (from (Germany) Köln)
51	DF	RUS	Kirill Glushchenkov
58	MF	RUS	Artyom Gorbunov
81	FW	RUS	Timur Melekestsev
82	MF	RUS	Andrei Mazurin
83	MF	RUS	Igor Shkolik
84	MF	RUS	Aleksei Usanov
85	DF	RUS	Dmitri Vladimirov
86	DF	RUS	Yuri Nesov
87	MF	RUS	Valentin Zekhov
89	GK	RUS	Vladislav Yarukov
98	FW	RUS	Roman Pukhov (from (Russia) CSKA Moscow)

Out: Note: Flags indicate national team as defined under FIFA eligibility rules; some limited exceptions apply. Players may hold more than one non-FIFA nationality.

No.	Pos.	Nation	Player
6	MF	SEN	Khaly Thiam (end of loan from (Hungary) MTK Budapest)
9	FW	RUS	Pavel Pogrebnyak (to (Russia) Tosno)
13	DF	RUS	Sergei Terekhov (to (Russia) Orenburg)
14	MF	BRA	Wánderson (to (Turkey) Alanyaspor)
21	FW	MNE	Fatos Bećiraj (to (Belgium) Mechelen)
22	DF	RUS	Maksim Nenakhov (on loan to (Russia) Tyumen)
41	MF	RUS	Aleksandr Sapeta (to (Russia) Rostov)
42	GK	RUS	Sergei Narubin
59	DF	RUS	Daniil Yermolin
69	FW	RUS	Semyon Belyakov (to (Russia) Anzhi Makhachkala)
96	MF	RUS	Maksim Kuzmin (on loan to (Russia) Fakel Voronezh)
—	MF	RUS	Ilya Petrov (to (Portugal) União de Leiria, previously on loan to (Russia) Avangard Kursk)

== Competitions ==
=== Russian Premier League ===
==== Results by round ====
Round	1	2	3	4	5	6	7	8	9	10	11	12	13	14	15	16	17	18	19	20	21	22	23	24	25	26	27	28	29	30
Ground	H	H	A	H	A	A	H	A	H	A	A	A	H	A	H	A	H	A	H	H	A	H	H	A	H	A	A	H	A	A
Result	D	L	L	W	L	W	D	L	D	L	D	L	W	D	L	D	D	L	W	W	D	D	W	L	L	L	W	D	W	W
Position	9	11	13	11	11	11	10	11	11	12	13	15	13	13	14	15	14	14	14	12	13	12	11	10	11	11	11	11	10	8

Updated to match(es) played on 13 May 2018. Source: See Results
A = Away; H = Home; W = Win; D = Draw; L = Loss

==== Results ====
18 July 2017 1	Dynamo Moscow	2 – 2	Spartak Moscow	Moscow
19:30 MSK (UTC+3)	Bećiraj (yellow card) 41'; Panchenko 54'; Tashayev 90+2'	Report	Promes 29'; Adriano 32'; Popov (yellow card) 72'	Stadium: Arena Khimki; Attendance: 17,133; Referee: Sergei Karasev

23 July 2017 2	Dynamo Moscow	0 – 1	Ural Yekaterinburg	Moscow
17:30 MSK (UTC+3)		Report	Merkulov (yellow card) 57'; Chanturia 89'; Bavin (yellow card) 90+2'	Stadium: Arena Khimki; Attendance: 6,853; Referee: Vladimir Moskalyov

29 July 2017 3	Akhmat Grozny	2 – 0	Dynamo Moscow	Grozny
20:00 MSK (UTC+3)	Ravanelli (yellow card) 58'; Ángel (yellow card) 74'; Mitrishev 80'; Rodolfo 83' (pen.)	Report	Sosnin (yellow card) 19'; Kozlov (yellow card) 77'	Stadium: Akhmat-Arena; Attendance: 17,324; Referee: Vladislav Bezborodov

5 August 2017 4	Dynamo Moscow	3 – 0	Amkar Perm	Moscow
17:30 MSK (UTC+3)	Panchenko 49'; Zotov 64'; Wánderson 82'	Report	Zaytsev (yellow card) 42'; Salugin (yellow card) 76'; Condé (yellow card) 90+1'	Stadium: Arena Khimki; Attendance: 5,423; Referee: Evgeny Turbin

9 August 2017 5	Rostov	1 – 0	Dynamo Moscow	Rostov-on-Don
20:00 MSK (UTC+3)	Gațcan (yellow card) 15'; Kalachev 19' (pen.); Bayramyan (yellow card) 21'; Ingason (yellow card) 26'; Parshivlyuk (yellow card) 56'	Report	Sow (yellow card) 11'; Terekhov (yellow card) 17'; Katrich (yellow card) 21'	Stadium: Olimp-2; Attendance: 10,215; Referee: Sergey Lapochkin

12 August 2017 6	Anzhi Makhachkala	1 – 3	Dynamo Moscow	Kaspiysk
20:00 MSK (UTC+3)	Yakovlev 9'; Khubulov (yellow card) 24'	Report	Bećiraj 15'; Panchenko 34', 76' (pen.); Sow (yellow card) 59'; Rykov (yellow card) 85'	Stadium: Anzhi Arena; Attendance: 5,339; Referee: Mikhail Vilkov

20 August 2017 7	Dynamo Moscow	1 – 1	Ufa	Moscow
17:30 MSK (UTC+3)	Zotov 87'	Report	Vaněk 45'; Oblyakov (yellow card) 71'; Paurević (yellow card) 76'; Jokić (yellow card) 90+1'	Stadium: Arena Khimki; Attendance: 6,179; Referee: Vladislav Bezborodov

27 August 2017 8	Krasnodar	2 – 0	Dynamo Moscow	Krasnodar
20:00 MSK (UTC+3)	Smolov 27', 60'; Kaboré (yellow card) 40'; Petrov (yellow card) 49'; Granqvist (yellow card) 71'	Report	Rykov (yellow card) 60'; Sow (yellow card) 63'	Stadium: Krasnodar Stadium; Attendance: 23,877; Referee: Kirill Levnikov

10 September 2017 9	Dynamo Moscow	0 – 0	Zenit St.Petersburg	Khimki
14:00 MSK (UTC+3)	Sow (yellow card) 45+2'; Temnikov (yellow card) 66'; Wánderson (yellow card) 84'	Report	Yerokhin (yellow card) 70'	Stadium: Arena Khimki; Attendance: 11,518; Referee: Aleksey Sukhoy

15 September 2017 10	Arsenal Tula	1 – 0	Dynamo Moscow	Tula
19:30 MSK (UTC+3)	Belyayev 16'; Shevchenko (yellow card) 67'; Kombarov (yellow card) 90+4'	Report	Sosnin (yellow card) 24'; Terekhov (yellow card) 44'	Stadium: Arsenal Stadium; Attendance: 12,450; Referee: Mikhail Vilkov

23 September 2017 11	Dynamo Moscow	0 – 0	CSKA Moscow	Khimki
16:30 MSK (UTC+3)		Report	Vitinho (yellow card) 83'	Stadium: Arena Khimki; Attendance: 10,427; Referee: Aleksei Nikolaev

1 October 2017 12	Lokomotiv Moscow	3 – 0	Dynamo Moscow	Moscow
16:30 MSK (UTC+3)	Fernandes 24'; Eder 33'; Al.Miranchuk 58'; Denisov (yellow card) 62'	Report		Stadium: RZD Arena; Attendance: 12,007; Referee: Sergei Karasev

14 October 2017 13	Dynamo Moscow	2 – 0	SKA-Khabarovsk	Khimki
14:00 MSK (UTC+3)	Kozlov 18'; Tashayev 78'	Report		Stadium: Arena Khimki; Attendance: 3,632; Referee: Sergey Ivanov

21 October 2017 14	Rubin Kazan	0 – 0	Dynamo Moscow	Kazan
16:30 MSK (UTC+3)		Report	Sosnin (yellow card) 57'; Morozov (yellow card) 90+1'	Stadium: Kazan Arena; Attendance: 5,878; Referee: Kirill Levnikov

29 October 2017 15	Dynamo Moscow	0 – 1	Tosno	Khimki
14:00 MSK (UTC+3)	Pogrebnyak (yellow card) 90+1'	Report	Galiulin 9'; Sukharev (yellow card) 32'; Kazayev (yellow card) 43'; Troshechkin (yellow card) 55'; Zabolotny (yellow card) 59'; Karnitsky (yellow card) 90+2'	Stadium: Arena Khimki; Attendance: 3,657; Referee: Aleksey Sukhoy

3 November 2017 16	Ural Yekaterinburg	2 – 2	Dynamo Moscow	Yekaterinburg
17:30 MSK (UTC+3)	Balažic 17', 90+1'; Boumal (yellow card) 32'; Bavin (yellow card) 40'; Kulakov (yellow card) 64'; Fidler (yellow card) 68'	Report	Holmén (yellow card) 41'; Šunjić 49'; Terekhov 74'	Stadium: SKB-Bank Arena; Attendance: 3,815; Referee: Sergey Ivanov

18 November 2017 17	Dynamo Moscow	1 – 1	Akhmat Grozny	Khimki
14:00 MSK (UTC+3)	Lutsenko 62'; Holmén (yellow card) 64'	Report	Ángel 31'; Sampaio (yellow card) 83'	Stadium: Arena Khimki; Attendance: 3,329; Referee: Vladislav Bezborodov

24 November 2017 18	Amkar Perm	2 – 1	Dynamo Moscow	Perm
17:30 MSK (UTC+3)	Gol 48'; Ezatolahi 68'; Zaytsev (yellow card) 90+2'	Report	Sosnin (yellow card) 18'; Sow (yellow card) 43'; Lutsenko 54' (pen.) (yellow card) 60'; Shunin (yellow card) 69'; Tsallagov (yellow card) 76'	Stadium: Zvezda Stadium; Attendance: 4,890; Referee: Artem Chistyakov

2 December 2017 19	Dynamo Moscow	2 – 0	Rostov	Khimki
14:00 MSK (UTC+3)	Temnikov (yellow card) 12'; Bećiraj 42'; Tashayev 45'; Rykov (yellow card) 58'	Report	Kalachev (yellow card) 25'; Makeyev (yellow card) 71'	Stadium: Arena Khimki; Attendance: 3,250; Referee: Vitaly Meshkov

9 December 2017 20	Dynamo Moscow	2 – 0	Anzhi Makhachkala	Khimki
14:00 MSK (UTC+3)	Tashayev 8'; Lutsenko 60'	Report		Stadium: Arena Khimki; Attendance: 3,525; Referee: Sergey Lapochkin

4 March 2018 21	Ufa	1 – 1	Dynamo Moscow	Ufa
13:00 YEKT (UTC+5)	Nedelcearu (yellow card) 46'; Paurević 51'	Report	Markov 17' (pen.); Sow (yellow card) 70'	Stadium: Neftyanik Stadium; Attendance: 6,178; Referee: Sergey Lapochkin

10 March 2018 22	Dynamo Moscow	0 – 0	Krasnodar	Khimki
16:30 MSK (UTC+3)		Report	Granqvist (yellow card) 50'; Pereyra (yellow card) 60'	Stadium: Arena Khimki; Attendance: 5,100; Referee: Evgeny Turbin

31 March 2018 24	Dynamo Moscow	2 – 1	Arsenal Tula	Khimki
16:30 MSK (UTC+3)	Rykov 71'; Černych 74' (yellow card) 75'; Panchenko (penalty missed) 81'	Report	Berkhamov (yellow card) 42'; Dzyuba 53'; Kombarov (yellow card) 73'; Novoseltsev (yellow card) 80'	Stadium: Arena Khimki; Attendance: 5,374; Referee: Vladimir Moskalyov

9 April 2018 25	CSKA Moscow	1 – 2	Dynamo Moscow	Moscow
19:30 MSK (UTC+3)	Chalov 60'; Wernbloom (yellow card) 68'; Dzagoev (yellow card) 80'	Report	Tashayev 11', 49' (yellow card) 83'; Sow (yellow card) 39'; Morozov (yellow card) 45'	Stadium: VEB Arena; Attendance: 19,504; Referee: Sergey Karasev

14 April 2018 26	Dynamo Moscow	0 – 4	Lokomotiv Moscow	Khimki
14:00 MSK (UTC+3)	Rykov (yellow card) 41'; Šunjić (yellow card) 58'; Rausch (yellow card) 76'	Report	An.Miranchuk 3', 72'; Al.Miranchuk (penalty missed) 21'; Denisov (yellow card) 29'; Farfán 42' (yellow card) 57'; Tarasov 58'; Rybus (yellow card) 67'; Ćorluka (yellow card) 69'	Stadium: Arena Khimki; Attendance: 10,114; Referee: Aleksey Eskov

18 April 2018 23	Zenit St.Petersburg	2 – 1	Dynamo Moscow	Saint Petersburg
19:30 MSK (UTC+3)	Criscito 57' (pen.); Skrobotov 90+3'	Report	Morozov (yellow card) 57'; Šunjić 88'; Temnikov (yellow card) 90+2'	Stadium: Krestovsky Stadium; Attendance: 33,793; Referee: Mikhail Vilkov

22 April 2018 27	SKA-Khabarovsk	0 – 1	Dynamo Moscow	Khabarovsk
11:00 MSK (UTC+3)	Hryshko (yellow card) 36'	Report	Šunjić (yellow card) 7'; Sow (yellow card) 34'; Rykov (yellow card) 43'; Tashayev 69'	Stadium: Lenin Stadium; Attendance: 6,120; Referee: Sergey Ivanov

30 April 2018 28	Dynamo Moscow	0 – 0	Rubin Kazan	Khimki
14:00 MSK (UTC+3)	Rausch (yellow card) 26'; Markov (yellow card) 56'	Report	Kuzmin (yellow card) 17'; Popov (yellow card) 35'; Podberyozkin (yellow card) 58'	Stadium: Arena Khimki; Attendance: 6,415; Referee: Vitaly Meshkov

5 May 2018 29	Tosno	1 – 2	Dynamo Moscow	Saint Petersburg
14:00 MSK (UTC+3)	Mirzov (yellow card) 5' (goal) 68'; Paliyenko (yellow card) 50'; Dugalić (yellow card) 85'; Yurchenko (yellow card) 90+4'	Report	Morozov (yellow card) 54'; Šunjić 56' (yellow card) 81'; Panchenko 79'	Stadium: Petrovsky Stadium; Attendance: 5,405; Referee: Pavel Kukuyan

13 May 2018 30	Spartak Moscow	0 – 1	Dynamo Moscow	Moscow
14:00 MSK (UTC+3)	Kutepov (yellow card) 34'; Rebrov (yellow card) 90+5'	Report	Rykov (yellow card) 8'; Kozlov (yellow card) 8'; Lutsenko 35' (pen.); Markov (yellow card) 90+4'; Tashayev (yellow card) 90+5'	Stadium: Otkritie Arena; Attendance: 42,124; Referee: Sergey Karasev

==== League table ====
Pos	Team	Pld	W	D	L	GF	GA	GD	Pts	Qualification or relegation
6	Ufa	30	11	10	9	34	30	+4	43	Qualification for the Europa League second qualifying round (Note: Tosno qualified for the Europa League group stage by winning the 2017–18 Russian Cup. However, since they failed to obtain a UEFA licence, the spot awarded to the cup winners was passed to fourth-placed team, the spot awarded to the fourth-placed team was passed to fifth-placed team, and the spot awarded to the fifth-placed team was passed to sixth-placed team.)
7	Arsenal Tula	30	12	6	12	35	41	−6	42	
8	Dynamo Moscow	30	10	10	10	29	30	−1	40	
9	Akhmat Grozny	30	10	9	11	30	34	−4	39	
10	Rubin Kazan	30	9	11	10	32	25	+7	38	

Updated to match(es) played on 13 May 2018. Source: Russian Premier League, Soccerway
Rules for classification: 1) Points; 2) Head-to-head points; 3) Head-to-head matches won; 4) Head-to-head goal difference; 5) Head-to-head goals scored; 6) Head-to-head away goals; 7) Matches won; 8) Goal difference; 9) Goals scored; 10) Away goals scored.

=== Russian Cup ===
20 September 2017 Round of 32	Spartak Nalchik	0 – 0 (4 – 2 p)	Dynamo Moscow	Nalchik
18:30 MSK (UTC+3)	Lelyukayev (yellow card) 55'	Report	Katrich (yellow card) 51'; Sapeta (yellow card) 80'; Morozov (yellow card) 81'; Sow (yellow card) 118'	Stadium: Spartak Stadium; Attendance: 3,000
	Penalties
	Khalid Shakhtiyev (penalty scored); Abazov (penalty scored); Mashukov (penalty scored); Pashtov (penalty scored)		Katrich (penalty missed); Lutsenko (penalty scored); Sapeta (penalty scored); Obolsky (penalty missed)

== Squad statistics ==
As of Match played 13 May 2018

=== Appearances and goals ===
No.	Pos	Nat	Player	Total		Premier League		Russian Cup	
No.	Pos	Nat	Player	Apps	Goals	Apps	Goals	Apps	Goals
1	GK	(Russia) RUS	Anton Shunin	30	0	30	0	0	0
2	DF	(Russia) RUS	Grigori Morozov	14	0	12+1	0	1	0
3	DF	(Sweden) SWE	Sebastian Holmén	24	0	23	0	0+1	0
4	DF	(Russia) RUS	Vladimir Rykov	16	1	15+1	1	0	0
5	MF	(Ghana) GHA	Aziz Tetteh	7	0	6+1	0	0	0
7	FW	(Russia) RUS	Yevgeni Markov	6	1	1+5	1	0	0
8	FW	(Russia) RUS	Kirill Panchenko	19	5	17+2	5	0	0
10	MF	(Russia) RUS	Aleksandr Zotov	15	2	10+4	2	1	0
11	MF	(Russia) RUS	Ivan Temnikov	19	0	12+7	0	0	0
13	FW	(Lithuania) LTU	Fiodor Černych	9	1	7+2	1	0	0
15	DF	(Russia) RUS	Ibragim Tsallagov	13	0	8+4	0	1	0
17	FW	(Russia) RUS	Anton Terekhov	6	1	4+2	1	0	0
20	MF	(Russia) RUS	Vyacheslav Grulyov	2	0	0+2	0	0	0
23	MF	(Russia) RUS	Anton Sosnin	22	0	13+9	0	0	0
25	DF	(Russia) RUS	Aleksei Kozlov	25	1	24+1	1	0	0
26	DF	(Russia) RUS	Nikita Kalugin	1	0	0	0	1	0
27	MF	(Senegal) SEN	Samba Sow	24	0	21+2	0	0+1	0
31	GK	(Russia) RUS	Igor Leshchuk	1	0	0	0	1	0
34	DF	(Russia) RUS	Konstantin Rausch	10	0	10	0	0	0
44	DF	(Bosnia and Herzegovina) BIH	Toni Šunjić	28	3	26+1	3	1	0
48	FW	(Russia) RUS	Yevgeni Lutsenko	23	4	18+4	4	1	0
77	MF	(Russia) RUS	Anatoli Katrich	5	0	2+2	0	1	0
88	MF	(Russia) RUS	Aleksandr Tashayev	27	7	23+3	7	1	0
90	FW	(Russia) RUS	Nikolay Obolsky	10	0	2+7	0	0+1	0
Players away from the club on loan:
Players who left Dynamo Moscow during the season:
6	MF	(Senegal) SEN	Khaly Thiam	6	0	4+2	0	0	0
7	MF	(Russia) RUS	Aleksei Ionov	5	0	5	0	0	0
9	FW	(Russia) RUS	Pavel Pogrebnyak	1	0	0+1	0	0	0
13	DF	(Russia) RUS	Sergei Terekhov	13	0	13	0	0	0
14	MF	(Brazil) BRA	Wánderson	14	1	4+9	1	1	0
21	FW	(Montenegro) MNE	Fatos Bećiraj	18	2	12+6	2	0	0
41	MF	(Russia) RUS	Aleksandr Sapeta	13	0	9+3	0	1	0

=== Goal scorers ===
Place	Position	Nation	Number	Name	Premier League	Russian Cup	Total
1	MF	(Russia)	88	Aleksandr Tashayev	7	0	7
2	FW	(Russia)	8	Kirill Panchenko	5	0	5
3	FW	(Russia)	48	Yevgeni Lutsenko	4	0	4
4	DF	(Bosnia and Herzegovina)	44	Toni Šunjić	3	0	3
5	MF	(Russia)	10	Aleksandr Zotov	2	0	2
5	FW	(Montenegro)	21	Fatos Bećiraj	2	0	2
7	FW	(Brazil)	14	Wánderson	1	0	1
7	DF	(Russia)	21	Aleksei Kozlov	1	0	1
7	FW	(Russia)	17	Anton Terekhov	1	0	1
7	FW	(Russia)	7	Yevgeni Markov	1	0	1
7	DF	(Russia)	4	Vladimir Rykov	1	0	1
7	FW	(Lithuania)	13	Fiodor Černych	1	0	1
				TOTALS	29	0	29

=== Disciplinary record ===
Number	Nation	Position	Name	Premier League		Russian Cup		Total	
Number	Nation	Position	Name	Yellow card	Red card	Yellow card	Red card	Yellow card	Red card
1	(Russia)	GK	Anton Shunin	1	0	1	0	2	0
2	(Russia)	DF	Grigori Morozov	4	0	1	0	5	0
3	(Sweden)	DF	Sebastian Holmén	2	0	0	0	2	0
4	(Russia)	DF	Vladimir Rykov	6	0	0	0	6	0
7	(Russia)	FW	Yevgeni Markov	2	0	0	0	2	0
11	(Russia)	MF	Ivan Temnikov	3	0	0	0	3	0
13	(Lithuania)	FW	Fiodor Černych	1	0	0	0	1	0
15	(Russia)	DF	Ibragim Tsallagov	1	0	0	0	1	0
23	(Russia)	MF	Anton Sosnin	4	0	0	0	4	0
25	(Russia)	DF	Aleksei Kozlov	2	0	0	0	2	0
27	(Senegal)	MF	Samba Sow	8	0	1	0	9	0
34	(Russia)	DF	Konstantin Rausch	2	0	0	0	2	0
44	(Bosnia and Herzegovina)	DF	Toni Šunjić	3	0	0	0	3	0
48	(Russia)	FW	Yevgeni Lutsenko	1	0	0	0	1	0
77	(Russia)	MF	Anatoli Katrich	1	0	1	0	2	0
88	(Russia)	MF	Aleksandr Tashayev	2	0	0	0	2	0
Players who left Dynamo Moscow during the season:
9	(Russia)	FW	Pavel Pogrebnyak	1	0	0	0	1	0
13	(Russia)	DF	Sergei Terekhov	2	0	0	0	2	0
14	(Brazil)	MF	Wánderson	1	0	0	0	1	0
21	(Montenegro)	FW	Fatos Bećiraj	1	0	0	0	1	0
41	(Russia)	MF	Aleksandr Sapeta	0	0	1	0	1	0
			TOTALS	48	0	4	0	52	0
