= 2018–19 FC Dynamo Moscow season =

Dinamo Moscow
2018–19 season
- Chairman: Yevgeni Muravyov
- Manager: Dmitri Khokhlov
- Stadium: Arena Khimki; VTB Arena
- Russian Premier League: 12th
- Russian Cup: Round of 16 vs Rubin Kazan
- Top goalscorer: League: Kirill Panchenko (5); All: Kirill Panchenko (5)
| Home colours | Away colours |

The 2018–19 Dinamo Moscow season was the club's second season back in the Russian Premier League, following their relegation at the end of the 2015–16 season. They finished the season in 12th place, reached the Round of 16 in the Russian Cup, where they were defeated by Rubin Kazan, and officially moved into their new stadium, the VTB Arena, on the final day of the season.

== Squad ==
Note: Flags indicate national team as defined under FIFA eligibility rules; some limited exceptions apply. Players may hold more than one non-FIFA nationality.

| No. | Pos. | Nation | Player |
|---|---|---|---|
| 1 | GK | RUS | Anton Shunin |
| 2 | DF | RUS | Grigori Morozov |
| 3 | DF | SWE | Sebastian Holmén |
| 4 | DF | RUS | Vladimir Rykov |
| 5 | MF | GHA | Abdul Aziz Tetteh |
| 6 | MF | RUS | Artur Yusupov |
| 7 | FW | RUS | Yevgeni Markov |
| 8 | FW | RUS | Kirill Panchenko |
| 9 | MF | POR | Miguel Cardoso |
| 10 | MF | LTU | Fiodor Černych |
| 11 | MF | RUS | Ivan Temnikov |
| 16 | GK | RUS | Ivan Zirikov |
| 17 | MF | RUS | Anton Terekhov |

| No. | Pos. | Nation | Player |
|---|---|---|---|
| 19 | MF | RUS | Vladimir Moskvichyov |
| 20 | MF | RUS | Vyacheslav Grulyov |
| 22 | MF | BRA | Joãozinho |
| 23 | MF | RUS | Anton Sosnin |
| 24 | DF | RUS | Roman Yevgenyev |
| 25 | DF | RUS | Aleksei Kozlov |
| 27 | MF | MLI | Samba Sow |
| 31 | GK | RUS | Igor Leshchuk |
| 34 | MF | RUS | Konstantin Rausch |
| 44 | DF | BIH | Toni Šunjić |
| 48 | FW | RUS | Yevgeni Lutsenko |
| 78 | MF | RUS | Danil Lipovoy |
| — | DF | RUS | Daniil Fyodorov |

=== Out on loan ===
Note: Flags indicate national team as defined under FIFA eligibility rules; some limited exceptions apply. Players may hold more than one non-FIFA nationality.

| No. | Pos. | Nation | Player |
|---|---|---|---|
| — | DF | RUS | Maksim Nenakhov (at SKA-Khabarovsk until 30 June 2019) |
| — | MF | RUS | Maksim Kuzmin (at Fakel Voronezh until 30 June 2019) |

| No. | Pos. | Nation | Player |
|---|---|---|---|
| — | MF | RUS | Aleksandr Zotov (at Yenisey Krasnoyarsk until 30 June 2019) |
| — | FW | RUS | Nikolay Obolsky (at Sochi until 30 June 2019) |

== Transfers ==
=== Summer ===
In: Note: Flags indicate national team as defined under FIFA eligibility rules; some limited exceptions apply. Players may hold more than one non-FIFA nationality.

| No. | Pos. | Nation | Player |
|---|---|---|---|
| 9 | MF | POR | Miguel Cardoso (from (Portugal) Tondela) |
| 22 | MF | BRA | Joãozinho (from (Russia) Krasnodar) |
| 57 | DF | RUS | Andrei Sorokin |
| 85 | DF | RUS | Vladislav Kozlov |
| 89 | MF | RUS | Maksim Danilin |

Out: Note: Flags indicate national team as defined under FIFA eligibility rules; some limited exceptions apply. Players may hold more than one non-FIFA nationality.

| No. | Pos. | Nation | Player |
|---|---|---|---|
| 10 | MF | RUS | Aleksandr Zotov (on loan to (Russia) Yenisey Krasnoyarsk) |
| 15 | MF | RUS | Ibragim Tsallagov (end of loan from (Russia) Zenit Saint Petersburg) |
| 26 | DF | RUS | Nikita Kalugin (to (Russia) Dynamo Saint Petersburg) |
| 35 | GK | RUS | Pyotr Kosarevsky (to (Russia) Veles Moscow) |
| 55 | FW | RUS | Kirill Burykin (to (Latvia) Ventspils II) |
| 68 | MF | RUS | Georgi Chelidze (to (Belgium) Tubize) |
| 70 | MF | RUS | Artyom Gorbunov (to (Russia) Krylia Sovetov Samara) |
| 77 | MF | RUS | Anatoli Katrich (to (Russia) Krasnodar) |
| 88 | MF | RUS | Aleksandr Tashayev (to (Russia) Spartak Moscow) |
| 90 | FW | RUS | Nikolay Obolsky (on loan to (Russia) Sochi) |
| 92 | FW | RUS | Maksim Obolsky |
| — | DF | RUS | Dmitri Belorukov (to (Russia) Anzhi Makhachkala, previously on loan to (Russia) Amkar Perm) |
| — | DF | RUS | Pavel Lelyukhin (released, previously on loan to (Russia) Spartak Moscow) |
| — | DF | RUS | Maksim Nenakhov (on loan to (Russia) SKA-Khabarovsk, previously on loan to (Russia) Tyumen) |
| — | MF | RUS | Mikhail Mogulkin (to (Russia) KAMAZ Naberezhnye Chelny, previously on loan to (Russia) Veles Moscow) |

=== Winter ===
In: Note: Flags indicate national team as defined under FIFA eligibility rules; some limited exceptions apply. Players may hold more than one non-FIFA nationality.

| No. | Pos. | Nation | Player |
|---|---|---|---|
| 6 | MF | RUS | Artur Yusupov (from (Russia) Rostov) |
| 52 | DF | RUS | Daniil Fyodorov (from (Russia) CSKA Moscow) |
| 57 | GK | RUS | Pyotr Kudakovskiy |
| 65 | DF | RUS | Ivan Yurchenko (from (Russia) Chertanovo-2 Moscow) |
| 68 | MF | RUS | Vladislav Lepyokhin |
| 70 | FW | RUS | Konstantin Tyukavin |
| 75 | DF | RUS | Robinzon Zvonkov |
| 92 | MF | RUS | Vladislav Galkin |

Out: Note: Flags indicate national team as defined under FIFA eligibility rules; some limited exceptions apply. Players may hold more than one non-FIFA nationality.

| No. | Pos. | Nation | Player |
|---|---|---|---|
| 64 | FW | RUS | Stanislav Krokhin (to (Russia) Arsenal Tula) |
| 91 | FW | RUS | Mikhail Ageyev (to (Russia) Lokomotiv Moscow) |

== Competitions ==
=== Russian Premier League ===
==== Results by round ====
| Round | 1 | 2 | 3 | 4 | 5 | 6 | 7 | 8 | 9 | 10 | 11 | 12 | 13 | 14 | 15 | 16 | 17 | 18 | 19 | 20 | 21 | 22 | 23 | 24 | 25 | 26 | 27 | 28 | 29 | 30 |
|---|---|---|---|---|---|---|---|---|---|---|---|---|---|---|---|---|---|---|---|---|---|---|---|---|---|---|---|---|---|---|
| Ground | H | H | A | H | A | H | A | H | A | A | H | A | H | A | H | A | H | A | H | A | H | A | H | H | A | H | A | H | A | H |
| Result | D | D | D | W | L | W | D | L | L | L | W | D | D | D | L | D | W | W | L | L | L | D | D | W | L | D | D | D | D | D |
| Position | 10 | 10 | 12 | 6 | 7 | 7 | 9 | 9 | 11 | 14 | 11 | 11 | 11 | 12 | 12 | 12 | 12 | 10 | 10 | 12 | 12 | 13 | 13 | 12 | 12 | 12 | 12 | 12 | 12 | 12 |

Updated to match(es) played on 26 May 2019. Source: See Results
A = Away; H = Home; W = Win; D = Draw; L = Loss

==== Results ====
| 29 July 2018 1 | Arsenal Tula | 0 – 0 | Dynamo Moscow | Tula |
| 16:30 MSK (UTC+3) | Čaušić (yellow card) 9'; Berkhamov (yellow card) 52'; Grigalava (yellow card) 89' | Report | Tetteh (red card) 7'; Markov (yellow card) 87' | Stadium: Arsenal Stadium; Attendance: 15,646; Referee: Stanislav Vasilyev |

| 3 August 2018 2 | Dynamo Moscow | 1 – 1 | Rubin Kazan | Khimki |
| 19:30 MSK (UTC+3) | Černych 14'; Sow (yellow card) 35'; Panchenko (yellow card) 45+2'; Markov (yellow card) 64' | Report | Poloz 51' | Stadium: Arena Khimki; Attendance: 5,841; Referee: Pavel Kukuyan |

| 10 August 2018 3 | Ural Yekaterinburg | 1 – 1 | Dynamo Moscow | Yekaterinburg |
| 17:30 MSK (UTC+3) | Yemelyanov (yellow card) 43'; Bicfalvi 54' | Report | Sosnin (yellow card) 83'; Markov 85' | Stadium: Central Stadium; Attendance: 16,271; Referee: Nikolay Voloshin |

| 20 August 2018 4 | Dynamo Moscow | 3 – 0 | Ufa | Khimki |
| 19:30 MSK (UTC+3) | Šunjić (yellow card) 50'; Sow (yellow card) 58'; Panchenko 63'; Lutsenko 84'; Joãozinho 90+4' | Report | Tumasyan (yellow card) 70' | Stadium: Arena Khimki; Attendance: 6,125; Referee: Vladimir Moskalev |

| 25 August 2018 5 | Spartak Moscow | 2 – 1 | Dynamo Moscow | Moscow |
| 19:00 MSK (UTC+3) | Promes 7' (pen.); Melgarejo 14'; Rasskazov (yellow card) 42'; Zobnin (yellow card) 63'; Luiz Adriano (yellow card) 90+3' | Report | Rykov (yellow card) 26' (goal) 82'; Sow (yellow card) 34'; Tetteh (yellow card) 49' | Stadium: Otkritie Arena; Attendance: 43,139; Referee: Evgeny Turbin |

| 2 September 2018 6 | Dynamo Moscow | 2 – 0 | Orenburg | Khimki |
| 16:30 MSK (UTC+3) | Černych (yellow card) 34'; Rausch (yellow card) 36'; Sow (yellow card) 38'; Markov 63'; Lutsenko 90+4' | Report | Begić (yellow card) 55'; Sutormin (yellow card) 75'; Andreyev (yellow card) 80' | Stadium: Arena Khimki; Attendance: 6,909; Referee: Sergey Lapochkin |

| 14 September 2018 7 | Lokomotiv Moscow | 1 – 1 | Dynamo Moscow | Moscow |
| 19:30 MSK (UTC+3) | An.Miranchuk 32'; Krychowiak (yellow card) 38' (yellow-red card) 66'; Barinov (yellow card) 71' | Report | Cardoso 5' | Stadium: RZD Arena; Attendance: 17,023; Referee: Aleksei Matyunin |

| 22 September 2018 8 | Dynamo Moscow | 0 – 1 | Anzhi Makhachkala | Khimki |
| 14:00 MSK (UTC+3) | Lutsenko (penalty missed) 90+1 | Report | Chaykovskyi (yellow card) 15'; Ponce 49'; Novoseltsev (yellow card) 59'; Dyupin (yellow card) 88' | Stadium: Arena Khimki; Attendance: 6,472; Referee: Vladislav Bezborodov |

| 30 September 2018 9 | Krasnodar | 3 – 0 | Dynamo Moscow | Krasnodar |
| 16:30 MSK (UTC+3) | Ari 18'; Claesson 45+1', 55' | Report | Holmén (yellow card) 24'; Šunjić (yellow card) 35'; Rykov (yellow card) 42'; Rausch (yellow card) 69' | Stadium: Krasnodar Stadium; Attendance: 30,124; Referee: Roman Galimov |

| 6 October 2018 10 | Krylia Sovetov | 1 – 0 | Dynamo Moscow | Samara |
| 14:00 MSK (UTC+3) | Kanunnikov (yellow card) 48'; Kornilenko 51'; Rogel (yellow card) 86'; Ryzhikov (yellow card) 90+1' | Report | Kozlov (yellow card) 9'; Joãozinho (yellow card) 48'; Cardoso (yellow card) 59'; Tetteh (yellow card) 73'; Yevgenyev (yellow card) 76'; Šunjić (yellow card) 90+1' | Stadium: Samara Arena; Attendance: 14,528; Referee: Vitali Meshkov |

| 21 October 2018 11 | Dynamo Moscow | 1 – 0 | Zenit St.Petersburg | Khimki |
| 14:00 MSK (UTC+3) | Holmén (yellow card) 23'; Tetteh (yellow card) 25'; Černych 75' | Report | Driussi (yellow card) 28' (yellow-red card) 37'; Kranevitter (yellow card) 69' | Stadium: Arena Khimki; Attendance: 12,734; Referee: Sergey Ivanov |

| 28 October 2018 12 | Akhmat Grozny | 0 – 0 | Dynamo Moscow | Grozny |
| 16:30 MSK (UTC+3) | Mohammadi (yellow card) 17'; Gashchenkov (yellow card) 70' | Report | Yevgenyev (yellow card) 40'; Morozov (yellow card) 58' | Stadium: Akhmat-Arena; Attendance: 9,324; Referee: Sergey Lapochkin |

| 3 November 2018 13 | Dynamo Moscow | 0 – 0 | CSKA Moscow | Khimki |
| 16:30 MSK (UTC+3) | Sow (yellow card) 10'; Rausch (yellow card) 14' (yellow-red card) 81'; Shunin (yellow card) 90+4' | Report | Becão (yellow card) 3'; Chalov (yellow card) 90' | Stadium: Arena Khimki; Attendance: 12,093; Referee: Aleksey Eskov |

| 10 November 2018 14 | Rostov | 0 – 0 | Dynamo Moscow | Rostov-on-Don |
| 19:00 MSK (UTC+3) | Ingason (yellow card) 25' | Report | Holmén (yellow card) 3'; Markov (yellow card) 45+1'; Šunjić (yellow card) 62'; Yevgenyev (yellow card) 85' | Stadium: Rostov Arena; Attendance: 27,437; Referee: Vitali Meshkov |

| 24 November 2018 15 | Dynamo Moscow | 1 – 2 | Yenisey Krasnoyarsk | Khimki |
| 14:00 MSK (UTC+3) | Yevgenyev (yellow card) 25'; Tetteh (yellow card) 37'; Joãozinho 53' (pen.); Cardoso (yellow card) 70'; Morozov (yellow card) 87' (yellow-red card) 89' | Report | Komkov 3'; Zanev (yellow card) 45+4'; Yatchenko 55'; Obradović (yellow card) 90+2' | Stadium: Arena Khimki; Attendance: 4,133; Referee: Vasili Kazartsev |

| 30 November 2018 16 | Rubin Kazan | 1 – 1 | Dynamo Moscow | Kazan |
| 19:30 MSK (UTC+3) | Azmoun (yellow card) 52'; Lutsenko 69' (o.g.); Granat (yellow card) 72' | Report | Kozlov (yellow card) 24'; Temnikov (yellow card) 30'; Grulyov 86' | Stadium: Kazan Arena; Attendance: 3,282; Referee: Evgeny Turbin |

| 9 December 2018 17 | Dynamo Moscow | 4 – 0 | Ural Yekaterinburg | Khimki |
| 14:00 MSK (UTC+3) | Joãozinho 12' (yellow card) 84'; Lutsenko 44'; Tetteh 61'; Kozlov 72' | Report | Bryzgalov (yellow card) 39'; Ilyin (yellow card) 41' | Stadium: Arena Khimki; Attendance: 4,825; Referee: Vladimir Moskalyov |

| 3 March 2019 18 | Ufa | 1 – 2 | Dynamo Moscow | Ufa |
| 11:30 MSK (UTC+3) | Igboun 32'; Paurević (yellow card) 72'; Alikin (yellow card) 81'; Jokić (yellow card) 86'; Nedelcearu (yellow card) 90+2' | Report | Yusupov (yellow card) 13'; Tetteh (yellow card) 45+1'; Lutsenko 60'; Kozlov (yellow card) 67'; Šunjić (yellow card) 78'; Grulyov 90+4' | Stadium: Neftyanik Stadium; Attendance: 10,926; Referee: Sergey Lapochkin |

| 10 March 2019 19 | Dynamo Moscow | 0 – 1 | Spartak Moscow | Khimki |
| 19:00 MSK (UTC+3) | Sow (yellow card) 15'; Yevgenyev (yellow card) 85' | Report | Dzhikiya 16' (yellow card) 76'; Guliyev (yellow card) 56'; Ayrton (yellow card) 69'; Luiz Adriano (yellow card) 80'; Zé Luís (yellow card) 83' | Stadium: Arena Khimki; Attendance: 14,674; Referee: Evgeny Turbin |

| 16 March 2019 20 | Orenburg | 1 – 0 | Dynamo Moscow | Orenburg |
| 11:30 MSK (UTC+3) | Begić (yellow card) 29'; Breyev (yellow card) 36'; Despotović 52' (yellow card) 53'; Andreyev (yellow card) 60'; Popović (yellow card) 74' | Report | Černych (yellow card) 15'; Holmén (yellow card) 38'; Lutsenko (yellow card) 62'; Tetteh (yellow card) 67' | Stadium: Gazovik Stadium; Attendance: 3,850; Referee: Sergey Ivanov |

| 30 March 2019 21 | Dynamo Moscow | 0 – 1 | Lokomotiv Moscow | Khimki |
| 14:00 MSK (UTC+3) | Šunjić (yellow card) 24'; Markov (yellow card) 51'; Tetteh 86' | Report | An.Miranchuk 64' (pen.) | Stadium: Arena Khimki; Attendance: 8,106; Referee: Aleksei Eskov |

| 6 April 2019 22 | Anzhi Makhachkala | 1 – 1 | Dynamo Moscow | Kaspiysk |
| 14:00 MSK (UTC+3) | Ponce 16'; Akhyadov (yellow card) 90+2'; Katsayev (yellow card) 90+4' | Report | Tetteh (yellow card) 10' (yellow-red card) 90+4'; Morozov (yellow card) 35'; Šunjić 73' | Stadium: Anzhi Arena; Attendance: 2,575; Referee: Vasiliy Kazartsev |

| 14 April 2019 23 | Dynamo Moscow | 1 – 1 | Krasnodar | Khimki |
| 14:00 MSK (UTC+3) | Markov (yellow card) 36' (goal) 77'; Lutsenko (yellow card) 43'; Sow (yellow card) 83' | Report | Kaboré (yellow card) 25'; Wanderson (yellow card) 41' (goal) 87' | Stadium: Arena Khimki; Attendance: 5,873; Referee: Evgeny Turbin |

| 20 April 2019 24 | Dynamo Moscow | 1 – 0 | Krylia Sovetov | Khimki |
| 16:30 MSK (UTC+3) | Yusupov (yellow card) 17'; Tetteh (yellow card) 21'; Panchenko 67' (yellow card) 90' | Report | Rabiu (yellow card) 35' | Stadium: Arena Khimki; Attendance: 5,352; Referee: Sergey Lapochkin |

| 24 April 2019 25 | Zenit St.Petersburg | 2 – 0 | Dynamo Moscow | Saint Petersburg |
| 21:00 MSK (UTC+3) | Barrios (yellow card) 52'; Dzyuba 60'; Azmoun 66' | Report | Panchenko (yellow card) 6'; Sow (yellow card) 20' | Stadium: Krestovsky Stadium; Attendance: 42,406; Referee: Sergey Ivanov |

| 27 April 2019 26 | Dynamo Moscow | 0 – 0 | Akhmat Grozny | Khimki |
| 19:00 MSK (UTC+3) | Tetteh (yellow card) 12'; Yusupov (yellow card) 54'; Markov (yellow card) 56'; Lutsenko (yellow card) 59' | Report | Nižić (yellow card) 90+5' | Stadium: Arena Khimki; Attendance: 4,712; Referee: Vladimir Moskalyov |

| 5 May 2019 27 | CSKA Moscow | 2 – 2 | Dynamo Moscow | Moscow |
| 16:30 MSK (UTC+3) | Bijol 28'; Magnússon (yellow card) 65'; Nishimura 85'; Becão (yellow card) 88' | Report | Cardoso (yellow card) 32' (goal) 35'; Panchenko 43'; Yevgenyev (yellow card) 89' | Stadium: VEB Arena; Attendance: 24,482; Referee: Sergei Karasev |

| 10 May 2019 28 | Dynamo Moscow | 0 – 0 | Rostov | Khimki |
| 14:00 MSK (UTC+3) | | Report | | Stadium: Arena Khimki; Attendance: 5,497; Referee: Vitali Meshkov |

| 19 May 2019 29 | Yenisey Krasnoyarsk | 2 – 2 | Dynamo Moscow | Krasnoyarsk |
| 14:00 MSK (UTC+3) | Kutyin 40' (pen.), 87'; Danchenko (yellow card) 64' | Report | Joãozinho 35' (pen.); Šunjić (yellow card) 55'; Yusupov 83' | Stadium: Central Stadium; Attendance: 7,568; Referee: Mikhail Vilkov |

| 26 May 2019 30 | Dynamo Moscow | 3 – 3 | Arsenal Tula | Moscow |
| 14:00 MSK (UTC+3) | Cardoso 2'; Yusupov (yellow card) 16'; Panchenko 29', 60'; Tetteh (yellow card) 31'; Morozov (yellow card) 45' | Report | Grigalava 16'; Kostadinov (yellow card) 47'; Kombarov (yellow card) 48'; Mirzov 52' (pen.) (yellow card) 63'; Gorbatenko 84' | Stadium: VTB Arena; Attendance: 23,340; Referee: Vladislav Bezborodov |

==== League table ====
| Pos | Team | Pld | W | D | L | GF | GA | GD | Pts | Qualification or relegation |
|---|---|---|---|---|---|---|---|---|---|---|
| 10 | Ural Yekaterinburg | 30 | 10 | 8 | 12 | 33 | 45 | −12 | 38 | |
| 11 | Rubin Kazan | 30 | 7 | 15 | 8 | 24 | 30 | −6 | 36 | |
| 12 | Dynamo Moscow | 30 | 6 | 15 | 9 | 28 | 28 | 0 | 33 | |
| 13 | Krylia Sovetov Samara (O) | 30 | 8 | 4 | 18 | 25 | 46 | −21 | 28 | Qualification for the Relegation play-offs |
| 14 | Ufa (O) | 30 | 5 | 11 | 14 | 24 | 34 | −10 | 26 | Qualification for the Relegation play-offs |

Updated to match(es) played on 26 May 2019. Source: Russian Premier League, Soccerway
Rules for classification: 1) Points; 2) Head-to-head points; 3) Head-to-head matches won; 4) Head-to-head goal difference; 5) Head-to-head goals scored; 6) Head-to-head away goals; 7) Matches won; 8) Goal difference; 9) Goals scored; 10) Away goals scored; 11) Play-off.
(O) Play-off winner

=== Russian Cup ===
| 26 September 2018 Round of 32 | Torpedo Moscow | 0 – 1 | Dynamo Moscow | Moscow |
| 20:15 MSK (UTC+3) | Shorkin (yellow card) 13'; Kertanov (yellow card) 45' | Report | Markov 34'; Morozov (yellow card) 45'; Rykov (yellow card) 57'; Sow (yellow card) 64'; Temnikov (yellow card) 66'; Kozlov (yellow card) 90+1' | Stadium: Eduard Streltsov Stadium; Attendance: 4,096; Referee: Aleksey Eskov |

| 25 October 2018 Round of 16 | Rubin Kazan | 1 – 0 | Dynamo Moscow | Kazan |
| 19:00 MSK (UTC+3) | Navas (yellow card) 26'; Azmoun 48' | Report | Cardoso (yellow card) 33'; Moskvichyov (yellow card) 54'; Grulyov (yellow card) 85'; Temnikov (yellow card) 90'; Terekhov (yellow card) 90+2' | Stadium: Kazan Arena; Attendance: 4,112; Referee: Stanislav Vasilyev |

== Squad statistics ==
As of match played 26 May 2019

=== Appearances and goals ===
| No. | Pos | Nat | Player | Total | | Premier League | | Russian Cup | |
| No. | Pos | Nat | Player | Apps | Goals | Apps | Goals | Apps | Goals |
|---|---|---|---|---|---|---|---|---|---|
| 1 | GK | (Russia) RUS | Anton Shunin | 30 | 0 | 30 | 0 | 0 | 0 |
| 2 | DF | (Russia) RUS | Grigori Morozov | 24 | 0 | 18+4 | 0 | 2 | 0 |
| 3 | DF | (Sweden) SWE | Sebastian Holmén | 22 | 0 | 17+3 | 0 | 2 | 0 |
| 4 | DF | (Russia) RUS | Vladimir Rykov | 15 | 1 | 11+3 | 1 | 1 | 0 |
| 5 | MF | (Ghana) GHA | Abdul Aziz Tetteh | 25 | 1 | 25 | 1 | 0 | 0 |
| 6 | MF | (Russia) RUS | Artur Yusupov | 12 | 1 | 12 | 1 | 0 | 0 |
| 7 | FW | (Russia) RUS | Yevgeni Markov | 23 | 4 | 8+14 | 3 | 1 | 1 |
| 8 | FW | (Russia) RUS | Kirill Panchenko | 25 | 5 | 19+5 | 5 | 1 | 0 |
| 9 | MF | (Portugal) POR | Miguel Cardoso | 17 | 3 | 14+2 | 3 | 1 | 0 |
| 10 | MF | (Lithuania) LTU | Fiodor Černych | 24 | 2 | 18+4 | 2 | 1+1 | 0 |
| 11 | MF | (Russia) RUS | Ivan Temnikov | 7 | 0 | 0+5 | 0 | 2 | 0 |
| 17 | MF | (Russia) RUS | Anton Terekhov | 3 | 0 | 0+2 | 0 | 0+1 | 0 |
| 19 | MF | (Russia) RUS | Vladimir Moskvichyov | 7 | 0 | 2+3 | 0 | 1+1 | 0 |
| 20 | MF | (Russia) RUS | Vyacheslav Grulyov | 12 | 2 | 1+10 | 2 | 0+1 | 0 |
| 22 | MF | (Brazil) BRA | Joãozinho | 31 | 4 | 29+1 | 4 | 0+1 | 0 |
| 23 | MF | (Russia) RUS | Anton Sosnin | 14 | 0 | 5+7 | 0 | 2 | 0 |
| 24 | DF | (Russia) RUS | Roman Yevgenyev | 20 | 0 | 17+2 | 0 | 1 | 0 |
| 25 | DF | (Russia) RUS | Aleksei Kozlov | 23 | 1 | 21+1 | 1 | 1 | 0 |
| 27 | MF | (Mali) MLI | Samba Sow | 18 | 0 | 15+2 | 0 | 1 | 0 |
| 31 | GK | (Russia) RUS | Igor Leshchuk | 2 | 0 | 0 | 0 | 2 | 0 |
| 34 | DF | (Russia) RUS | Konstantin Rausch | 16 | 0 | 13+3 | 0 | 0 | 0 |
| 44 | DF | (Bosnia and Herzegovina) BIH | Toni Šunjić | 30 | 1 | 29 | 1 | 1 | 0 |
| 48 | FW | (Russia) RUS | Yevgeni Lutsenko | 31 | 4 | 26+4 | 4 | 1 | 0 |
| 78 | DF | (Russia) RUS | Danil Lipovoy | 5 | 0 | 0+3 | 0 | 1+1 | 0 |
Players away from the club on loan:
Players who left Dynamo Moscow during the season:

=== Goal scorers ===
| Place | Position | Nation | Number | Name | Premier League | Russian Cup | Total |
|---|---|---|---|---|---|---|---|
| 1 | FW | (Russia) | 8 | Kirill Panchenko | 5 | 0 | 5 |
| 2 | FW | (Russia) | 48 | Yevgeni Lutsenko | 4 | 0 | 4 |
| 2 | MF | (Brazil) | 22 | Joãozinho | 4 | 0 | 4 |
| 2 | FW | (Russia) | 7 | Yevgeni Markov | 3 | 1 | 4 |
| 5 | MF | (Portugal) | 9 | Miguel Cardoso | 3 | 0 | 3 |
| 6 | FW | (Lithuania) | 10 | Fiodor Černych | 2 | 0 | 2 |
| 6 | FW | (Russia) | 20 | Vyacheslav Grulyov | 2 | 0 | 2 |
| 8 | DF | (Russia) | 4 | Vladimir Rykov | 1 | 0 | 1 |
| 8 | DF | (Bosnia and Herzegovina) | 44 | Toni Šunjić | 1 | 0 | 1 |
| 8 | DF | (Russia) | 25 | Aleksei Kozlov | 1 | 0 | 1 |
| 8 | MF | (Ghana) | 5 | Abdul Aziz Tetteh | 1 | 0 | 1 |
| 8 | MF | (Russia) | 6 | Artur Yusupov | 1 | 0 | 1 |
| | | | | TOTALS | 27 | 1 | 28 |

=== Disciplinary record ===
| Number | Nation | Position | Name | Premier League | | Russian Cup | | Total | |
| Number | Nation | Position | Name | Yellow card | Red card | Yellow card | Red card | Yellow card | Red card |
| 1 | (Russia) | GK | Anton Shunin | 1 | 0 | 0 | 0 | 1 | 0 |
| 2 | (Russia) | DF | Grigori Morozov | 5 | 1 | 1 | 0 | 6 | 1 |
| 3 | (Sweden) | DF | Sebastian Holmén | 4 | 0 | 0 | 0 | 4 | 0 |
| 4 | (Russia) | DF | Vladimir Rykov | 2 | 0 | 1 | 0 | 3 | 0 |
| 5 | (Ghana) | MF | Abdul Aziz Tetteh | 12 | 2 | 0 | 0 | 12 | 2 |
| 6 | (Russia) | MF | Artur Yusupov | 4 | 0 | 0 | 0 | 4 | 0 |
| 7 | (Russia) | FW | Yevgeni Markov | 6 | 0 | 0 | 0 | 6 | 0 |
| 8 | (Russia) | MF | Kirill Panchenko | 3 | 0 | 0 | 0 | 3 | 0 |
| 9 | (Portugal) | MF | Miguel Cardoso | 3 | 0 | 1 | 0 | 4 | 0 |
| 10 | (Lithuania) | MF | Fiodor Černych | 2 | 0 | 0 | 0 | 2 | 0 |
| 11 | (Russia) | MF | Ivan Temnikov | 1 | 0 | 2 | 0 | 3 | 0 |
| 17 | (Russia) | MF | Anton Terekhov | 0 | 0 | 1 | 0 | 1 | 0 |
| 19 | (Russia) | MF | Vladimir Moskvichyov | 0 | 0 | 1 | 0 | 1 | 0 |
| 20 | (Russia) | MF | Vyacheslav Grulyov | 0 | 0 | 1 | 0 | 1 | 0 |
| 22 | (Brazil) | MF | Joãozinho | 2 | 0 | 0 | 0 | 2 | 0 |
| 23 | (Russia) | MF | Anton Sosnin | 1 | 0 | 0 | 0 | 1 | 0 |
| 24 | (Russia) | DF | Roman Yevgenyev | 6 | 0 | 0 | 0 | 6 | 0 |
| 25 | (Russia) | DF | Aleksei Kozlov | 3 | 0 | 1 | 0 | 4 | 0 |
| 27 | (Mali) | MF | Samba Sow | 8 | 0 | 1 | 0 | 9 | 0 |
| 34 | (Russia) | DF | Konstantin Rausch | 4 | 1 | 0 | 0 | 4 | 1 |
| 44 | (Bosnia and Herzegovina) | DF | Toni Šunjić | 7 | 0 | 0 | 0 | 7 | 0 |
| 48 | (Russia) | FW | Yevgeni Lutsenko | 3 | 0 | 0 | 0 | 3 | 0 |
| | | | TOTALS | 73 | 4 | 10 | 0 | 83 | 4 |
