= Pavel Pogrebnyak =

Russian footballer (born 1983)

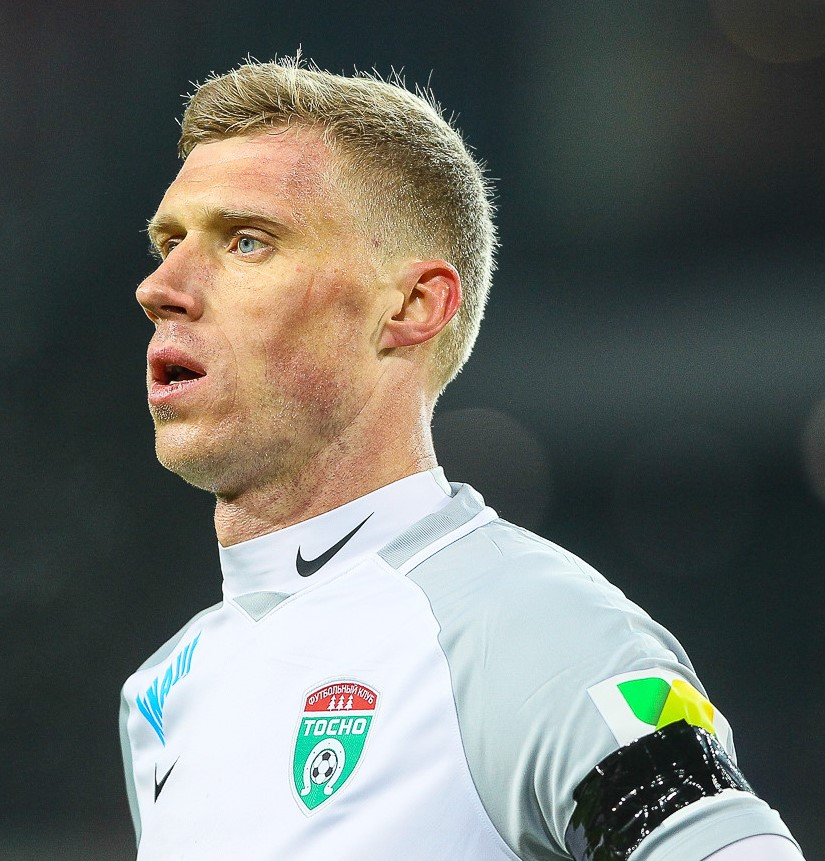
- Pogrebnyak with Tosno in 2018

Personal information
- Full name: Pavel Viktorovich Pogrebnyak
- Date of birth: 8 November 1983 (age 43)
- Place of birth: Moscow, Russian SFSR, Soviet Union
- Height: 1.88 m (6 ft 2 in)
- Position: Forward

Youth career
- 1989–2002: Spartak Moscow

Senior career*
Years	Team	Apps	(Gls)
2002–2005	Spartak Moscow	18	(2)
2003	→ Baltika Kaliningrad (loan)	40	(15)
2004	→ Khimki (loan)	12	(6)
2005	→ Shinnik Yaroslavl (loan)	23	(4)
2006	Tom Tomsk	26	(13)
2007–2009	Zenit Saint Petersburg	58	(22)
2009–2012	VfB Stuttgart	68	(15)
2012	Fulham	12	(6)
2012–2015	Reading	93	(26)
2015–2018	Dynamo Moscow	25	(1)
2018	Tosno	6	(3)
2018–2021	Ural Yekaterinburg	45	(10)
Total		426	(123)

International career
2004–2005	Russia U21	6	(0)
2006–2012	Russia	33	(8)
- * Club domestic league appearances and goals

Pavel Viktorovich Pogrebnyak (Russian: Па́вел Ви́кторович Погребня́к [ˈpavʲɪl ˈvʲiktərəvʲɪtɕ pəɡrʲɪbˈnʲak]; born 8 November 1983) is a Russian former professional footballer who played as a forward.

Born in Moscow, Pogrebnyak began his career at Spartak Moscow, making his professional debut in 2002. Over the next three years, he spent time away on loan at Baltika Kaliningrad, Khimki and Shinnik Yaroslavl before joining Tom Tomsk in 2006. After a season with them, he moved to top Russian side Zenit St. Petersburg. There he spent three seasons and had his greatest spell of success, winning the Russian Premier League, the Russian Super Cup, the UEFA Europa League and the UEFA Super Cup. In 2009, he joined German side VfB Stuttgart. After two and a half seasons, he moved to English Premier League side Fulham in January 2012, and then to Reading six months later.

He is nicknamed The Pog, Pogreb ("The Cellar") or Velikiy Po ("Po the Great"), the latter popularized by his former Zenit teammate Andrei Arshavin. He is a "powerful player who holds the ball up well."

== Club career ==
=== Early career ===
Pogrebnyak started playing football at the age of six for the Spartak Moscow football school. In 2001, he made his debut for the Spartak reserve team and one year later he was selected for the first team squad. Between 2001 and 2003, he scored eight goals in 23 appearances.

In 2003, Pogrebnyak played 40 matches and scored 15 goals while on loan with Baltika Kaliningrad. He played 16 times and scored two goals for Spartak Moscow the next season. The same season he also scored six goals for FC Khimki in 12 appearances. In 2005, Pogrebnyak played for Shinnik Yaroslavl and scored four goals in 23 matches. Pogrebnyak made his true breakthrough during the 2006 season with Tom Tomsk scoring 13 goals in 26 matches and became one of the favorites amongst the local fans.

=== Zenit St. Petersburg ===
Pogrebnyak was signed in the off-season by Zenit St. Petersburg. In 2007, he scored 13 goals as Zenit won the national league. Zenit won the 2008 Russian Super Cup 2–1 over Lokomotiv Moscow, with Pogrebnyak scoring the winner in the 82nd minute.

Along with Luca Toni, Pogrebnyak was joint top-scorer in the 2007–08 UEFA Cup season, scoring ten goals and helping Zenit reach the final to be played at the City of Manchester Stadium. However, Pogrebnyak was to miss the final because of suspension following a third tournament booking in the semifinal's second leg win over Bayern Munich. In the final, Zenit still triumphed over runners-up Rangers to add their first European silverware. In the 2008 UEFA Super Cup he scored one of the Zenit's two goals in the 2–1 over English champions Manchester United.

On 28 January 2009, Zenit officials declared that they were on the verge of accepting a bid from Blackburn Rovers which would see the player move to the English side during the January transfer window, but the transfer did not take place.

=== Stuttgart ===
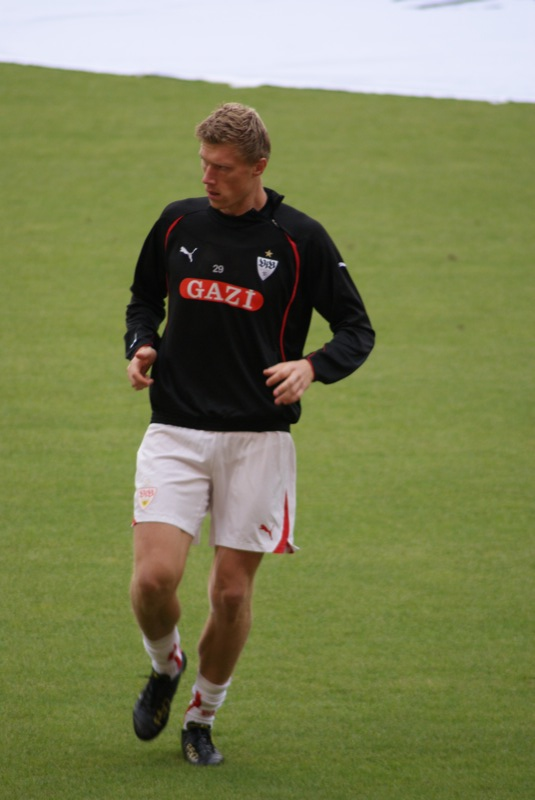
Pogrebnyak in August 2010

On 1 August 2009, he agreed to join VfB Stuttgart. Pogrebnyak made his Bundesliga debut seven days later by playing all 90 minutes in the opening day 2–0 defeat to the defending champions Wolfsburg. He scored his first goal in his second game, on 15 August 2009, in Stuttgart's 4–2 win over Freiburg, in which he also won a penalty.

He ended his first season in German football scoring eight goals (six in the league). He then started the 2010–11 season scoring four goals in the first four games including his first hat-trick in Stuttgart's historic 7–0 win against Borussia Mönchengladbach.

=== Fulham ===
On 31 January 2012, Pogrebnyak moved to Premier League side Fulham and signed a contract until the end of the season. He then scored on his debut in the 2–1 win over Stoke City on 11 February 2012. In the following game he scored again, this time against London rivals Queens Park Rangers giving Fulham a 1–0 win. He then scored a perfect hat-trick in his next game, in a 5–0 win against Wolves on 4 March, meaning he had scored five goals in his first three games for Fulham. This made him the quickest player to reach five goals in Premier League history. On 21 April 2012, he returned from an ankle injury to score in a 2–1 win against Wigan Athletic at Craven Cottage. He was released by Fulham on 1 July after failing to reach terms to extend his contract. Pogrebnyak announced that whatever happens over his contract he will remain in England.

=== Reading ===
On 8 July 2012, shortly after UEFA Euro 2012, Pogrebnyak signed a four-year contract with Reading on a free transfer. Manager Brian McDermott confirmed that it had been a "long process" as the deal was subject to Pogrebnyak obtaining a work permit while the club also denied rumours that he would be earning £65,000 a week. He made his debut on the opening day of the 2012–13 Premier League against Stoke City and scored his first goal in Reading's next game, a 4–2 defeat to Chelsea. He scored a last-minute goal in Reading's home game against West Bromwich Albion in January which saw them come from 2–0 down to win 3–2 but did not score again that season, finishing with eight goals, five in the Premier League.

Following Reading's relegation, Pogrebnyak was linked with a move away from the club but did not leave. He scored his first goals in more than eight months after netting twice in a 3–1 win over Derby County in September 2013.

=== Dynamo Moscow ===
On 27 August 2015, Pogrebnyak moved back to Russia, signing a three-year contract with Dynamo Moscow.

Dynamo released him on 25 January 2018, citing disciplinary reasons, such as attending a Juventus - Inter Milan game in Italy on the same day Dynamo played a league game and participating in the annual exhibition FC Spartak Moscow academy alumni game without Dynamo's authorization. Pogrebnyak said he will demand the compensation for the full length of his contract through the Russian Football Union.

=== Tosno ===
On 22 February 2018, he signed a contract until the end of the 2017–18 season with FC Tosno. Pogrebnyak was crucial to the biggest achievement in the club's history, which came on 9 May 2018 with their victory in the 2017–18 Russian Cup final.

=== Ural Yekaterinburg ===
On 29 August 2018, he signed a contract with FC Ural Yekaterinburg. On 24 July 2020, Pogrebnyak was released from the club. After missing the first 10 games of the 2020–21 Russian Premier League season, he returned to Ural on 16 October 2020. On 10 June 2021, he left Ural once again as his contract expired.

== International career ==
Pogrebnyak debuted for the Russian national team on 16 August 2006 in a friendly match against Latvia, where he scored his first goal. He was also initially called up as part of the Russian squad for UEFA Euro 2008, but because of a knee injury he picked up in a friendly match versus Serbia, he was replaced by Oleg Ivanov before Russia began the tournament. He was confirmed for the finalized UEFA Euro 2012 squad on 25 May 2012.

On 12 May 2014, Pogrebnyak was called up to the provisional 30-man Russian World Cup squad, however four days later he was replaced by Denis Cheryshev as the squad was cut down to 25 players.

== Personal life ==
Pogrebnyak is married to Maria Shatalova-Pogrebnyak and they have three sons. In July 2023, Shatalova-Pogrebnyak filed for divorce.

He is the brother of Kirill Pogrebnyak and Nikolai Pogrebnyak, they are both free agents as of June 2021.

In March 2019 Pogrebnyak was accused of racism after saying it was "laughable" for black players to represent the Russian national team. Russian Football Union fined him 250,000 rubles (approximately €3,300) and put him on probation until the end of the 2018–19 season for his statements.

== Career statistics ==
=== Club ===
As of match played 13 May 2018

Appearances and goals by club, season and competition
Club	Season	League			National cup		League cup		Europe		Other		Total	
Club	Season	Division	Apps	Goals	Apps	Goals	Apps	Goals	Apps	Goals	Apps	Goals	Apps	Goals
Spartak Moscow	2002	Russian Premier League	2	0	—		—		—		—		2	0
Spartak Moscow	2004	Russian Premier League	16	2	1	0	—		5	3	1 (Note: One appearance in Russian Super Cup)	0	23	5
Spartak Moscow	Total		18	2	1	0	0	0	5	3	1	0	25	5
Baltika Kaliningrad (loan)	2003	FNL	40	15	1	0	—		—		—		41	15
Khimki (loan)	2004	FNL	12	6	1	0	—		—		—		13	6
Shinnik Yaroslavl (loan)	2005	Russian Premier League	23	4	2	1	—		—		—		25	5
Tom Tomsk	2006	Russian Premier League	26	13	1	1	—		—		—		27	14
Zenit	2007	Russian Premier League	24	11	4	2	—		7	4	—		35	17
Zenit	2008	Russian Premier League	19	6	—		—		14	8	2 (Note: One appearance and one goal in UEFA Super Cup, one appearance and one goal in Russian Super Cup)	2	35	16
Zenit	2009	Russian Premier League	15	5	1	1	—		4	0	—		20	6
Zenit	Total		58	22	5	3	0	0	25	12	2	2	90	39
VfB Stuttgart	2009–10	Bundesliga	28	6	2	0	—		10	2	—		40	8
VfB Stuttgart	2010–11	Bundesliga	26	8	3	2	—		7	2	—		36	12
VfB Stuttgart	2011–12	Bundesliga	14	1	1	0	—		—		—		15	1
VfB Stuttgart	Total		68	15	6	2	0	0	17	4	0	0	91	21
Fulham (loan)	2011–12	Premier League	12	6	—		—		—		—		12	6
Reading	2012–13	Premier League	29	5	0	0	2	2	—		—		31	7
Reading	2013–14	Championship	39	13	1	0	0	0	—		—		40	13
Reading	2014–15	Championship	26	6	5	0	1	0	—		—		32	6
Reading	Total		94	24	6	0	3	2	0	0	0	0	103	26
Dynamo Moscow	2015–16	Russian Premier League	16	1	3	0	—		—		—		19	1
Dynamo Moscow	2016–17	Russian Premier League	8	0	1	0	—		—		—		9	0
Dynamo Moscow	2017–18	Russian Premier League	1	0	0	0	—		—		—		1	0
Dynamo Moscow	Total		25	1	4	0	0	0	0	0	0	0	29	1
Tosno	2017–18	Russian Premier League	6	3	2	1	—		—		—		8	4
Career total			382	111	29	8	3	2	47	19	3	2	464	142

=== International ===
Appearances and goals by national team and year
National team	Year	Apps	Goals
Russia	2006	5	2
Russia	2007	2	0
Russia	2008	5	3
Russia	2009	5	0
Russia	2010	7	2
Russia	2011	6	1
Russia	2012	3	0
Total		33	8

Scores and results list Russia's goal tally first, score column indicates score after each Pogrebnyak goal.

List of international goals scored by Pavel Pogrebnyak
No.	Date	Venue	Opponent	Score	Result	Competition
1	16 August 2006	Lokomotiv Stadium, Moscow, Russia	Latvia	1–0	1–0	Friendly
2	11 October 2006	Petrovsky Stadium, Saint Petersburg, Russia	Estonia	1–0	2–0	Euro 2008 qualifying
3	23 May 2008	Lokomotiv Stadium, Moscow, Russia	Kazakhstan	1–0	6–0	Friendly
4	28 May 2008	Wacker-Arena, Burghausen, Germany	Serbia	1–0	2–1	Friendly
5	10 September 2008	Lokomotiv Stadium, Moscow, Russia	Wales	2–1	2–1	2010 FIFA World Cup qualification
6	3 September 2010	Estadi Comunal, Andorra la Vella, Andorra	Andorra	1–0	2–0	UEFA Euro 2012 qualifying
7	3 September 2010	Estadi Comunal, Andorra la Vella, Andorra	Andorra	2–0	2–0	UEFA Euro 2012 qualifying
8	10 August 2011	Luzhniki Stadium, Moscow, Russia	Serbia	1–0	1–0	Friendly

== Honours ==
Zenit Saint Petersburg

- Russian Premier League: 2007
- Russian Super Cup: 2008
- UEFA Cup: 2007–08
- UEFA Super Cup: 2008

Tosno

- Russian Cup: 2017–18

Individual

- UEFA Cup Top scorer: 2007–08
