= Zalim Makoyev =

Russian footballer

Personal information
- Full name: Zalim Khasanbiyevich Makoyev
- Date of birth: 24 August 1994 (age 32)
- Place of birth: Nalchik, Russia
- Height: 1.82 m (6 ft 0 in)
- Position: Right back

Senior career*
Years	Team	Apps	(Gls)
2011–2017	Spartak Nalchik	61	(1)
2017–2018	Tyumen	10	(1)
2018	Armavir	4	(0)
2019	Spartak Nalchik	8	(0)
2020	Dynamo Stavropol	1	(0)
2020–2023	Spartak Nalchik	57	(2)
2023–2024	West Armenia	13	(0)
2024–2025	Dynamo Stavropol	35	(2)
- * Club domestic league appearances and goals as of 22 November 2025

Zalim Khasanbiyevich Makoyev (Russian: Залим Хасанбиевич Макоев; born 24 August 1994) is a Russian footballer who plays as a right back.

== Club career ==
He made his debut in the Russian Football National League for PFC Spartak Nalchik on 28 July 2013, in a game against FC Sibir Novosibirsk.
