= Anton Shunin =

Russian footballer (born 1987)

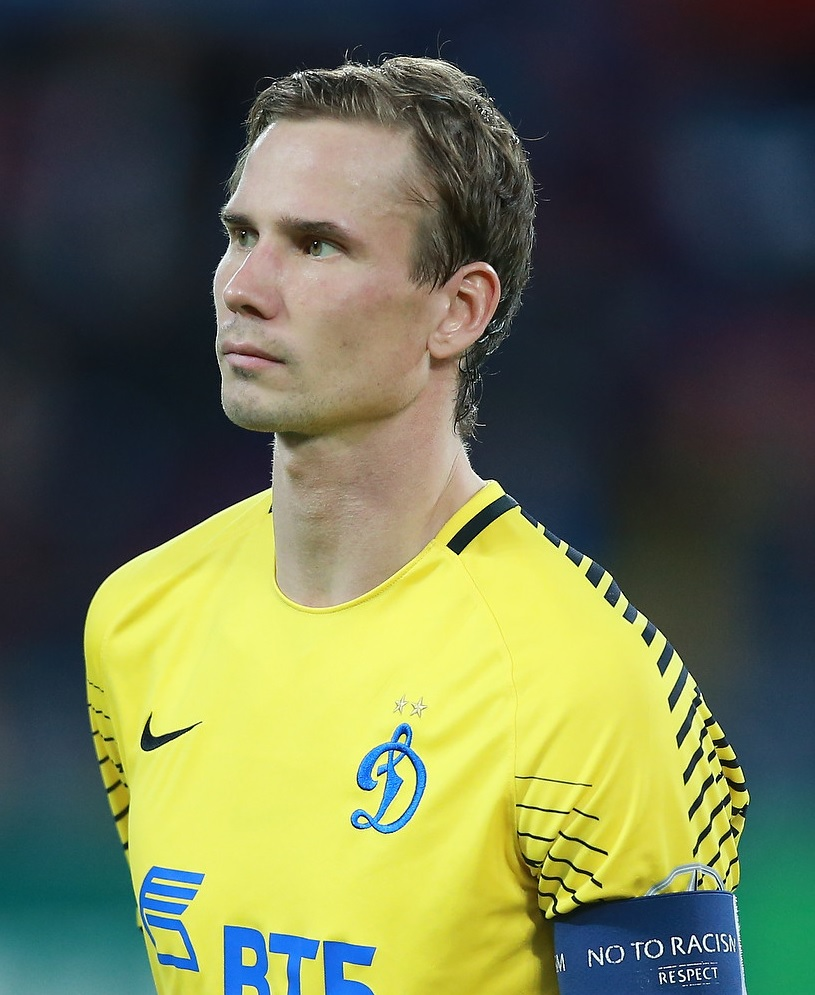
- Shunin with Dynamo Moscow in 2018

Personal information
- Full name: Anton Vladimirovich Shunin
- Date of birth: 27 January 1987 (age 39)
- Place of birth: Moscow, Russian SFSR, USSR
- Height: 1.94 m (6 ft 4 in)
- Position: Goalkeeper

Youth career
- 1994–2007: Dynamo Moscow

Senior career*
| Years | Team | Apps | (Gls) |
| 2007–2024 | Dynamo Moscow | 339 | (0) |

International career
| 2007 | Russia U-21 | 6 | (0) |
| 2011 | Russia-2 | 1 | (0) |
| 2007–2022 | Russia | 15 | (0) |
- * Club domestic league appearances and goals

Anton Vladimirovich Shunin (Russian: Антон Владимирович Шунин; born 27 January 1987) is a Russian former footballer who played as a goalkeeper.

== Club career ==
Shunin is a youth product of Dynamo Moscow. He made his debut on 21 April 2007 in a 2–1 win over Khimki.

On 17 November 2012, Shunin was struck by a firecracker thrown from the stands during a Russian Premier League match against FC Zenit Saint Petersburg. After the match had been stopped, it was confirmed that Shunin had sustained a burn of the cornea in one eye.

He was voted as player of the month for November 2019 by Dynamo fans.

On 4 August 2020, he was voted Player of the Year by Dynamo fans for the 2019–20 season, the prize he also won in 2018–19. He was voted player of the month again for August 2020 and September 2020.

On 16 November 2021, he extended his contract until the end of the 2023–24 season. Shunin left Dynamo after that contract expired. He announced his retirement from playing in May 2025.

== International career ==
Due to presence of Igor Akinfeev, another Russian one-club man goalkeeper of CSKA Moscow fame, Shunin's opportunities in the national team have been limited for most part of his senior career.

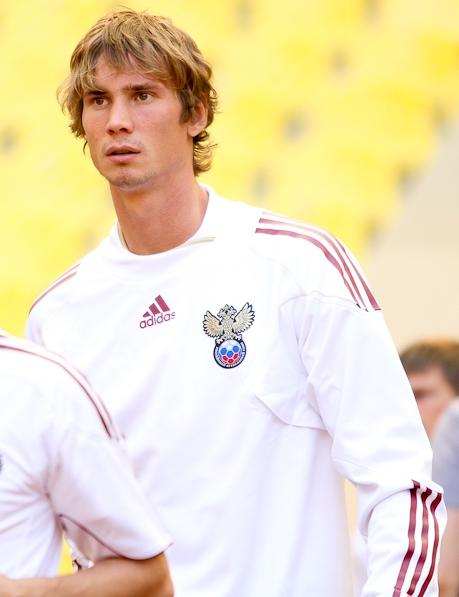
Shunin with the Russia national football team in 2011

He made his international debut on 22 August 2007 in a friendly match which ended 2–2 against Poland.

After a three-year break, he was called up for the national team again for a friendly game against Belgium on 17 November 2010.

He was confirmed for the finalized UEFA Euro 2012 squad on 25 May 2012.

After another 6 years without call-ups, he was included in the squad for the games against Turkey and Czech Republic in September 2018, two months after then retirement of goalkeeper Igor Akinfeev from international football. He played his first competitive match for his country on 19 November 2019 in a Euro 2020 qualifier against San Marino, keeping a clean sheet.

In the UEFA Nations League in 2020, Shunin was briefly the first choice goalkeeper of the national team.

On 11 May 2021, he was included in the preliminary extended 30-man squad for UEFA Euro 2020. On 2 June 2021, he was included in the final squad. He played the opening game against Belgium as Russia lost 0–3. He did not appear in the remaining games as Russia was eliminated at group stage.

== Personal life ==
Shunin has a son named Artemy (born 2012) with his first wife, Veronica. In July 2018, Anton Shunin married Russian model, Kate Grigorieva. Their daughter Sofia was born on 22 May 2020.

== Career statistics ==
=== Club ===
As of match played 25 May 2024

Appearances and goals by club, season and competition
| Club | Season | League | | | Cup | | Continental | | Total | |
| Club | Season | Division | Apps | Goals | Apps | Goals | Apps | Goals | Apps | Goals |
|---|---|---|---|---|---|---|---|---|---|---|
| Dynamo Moscow | 2007 | Russian Premier League | 23 | 0 | 2 | 0 | – | | 25 | 0 |
| Dynamo Moscow | 2008 | Russian Premier League | 9 | 0 | 0 | 0 | – | | 9 | 0 |
| Dynamo Moscow | 2009 | Russian Premier League | 8 | 0 | 0 | 0 | 0 | 0 | 8 | 0 |
| Dynamo Moscow | 2010 | Russian Premier League | 9 | 0 | 1 | 0 | – | | 10 | 0 |
| Dynamo Moscow | 2011–12 | Russian Premier League | 41 | 0 | 5 | 0 | – | | 46 | 0 |
| Dynamo Moscow | 2012–13 | Russian Premier League | 23 | 0 | 2 | 0 | 3 | 0 | 28 | 0 |
| Dynamo Moscow | 2013–14 | Russian Premier League | 7 | 0 | 0 | 0 | – | | 7 | 0 |
| Dynamo Moscow | 2014–15 | Russian Premier League | 2 | 0 | 1 | 0 | 1 | 0 | 4 | 0 |
| Dynamo Moscow | 2015–16 | Russian Premier League | 7 | 0 | 1 | 0 | – | | 8 | 0 |
| Dynamo Moscow | 2016–17 | Russian Football National League | 35 | 0 | 0 | 0 | – | | 35 | 0 |
| Dynamo Moscow | 2017–18 | Russian Premier League | 30 | 0 | 0 | 0 | – | | 30 | 0 |
| Dynamo Moscow | 2018–19 | Russian Premier League | 30 | 0 | 0 | 0 | – | | 30 | 0 |
| Dynamo Moscow | 2019–20 | Russian Premier League | 23 | 0 | 1 | 0 | – | | 24 | 0 |
| Dynamo Moscow | 2020–21 | Russian Premier League | 27 | 0 | 2 | 0 | 1 | 0 | 30 | 0 |
| Dynamo Moscow | 2021–22 | Russian Premier League | 26 | 0 | 0 | 0 | – | | 26 | 0 |
| Dynamo Moscow | 2022–23 | Russian Premier League | 24 | 0 | 2 | 0 | – | | 26 | 0 |
| Dynamo Moscow | 2023–24 | Russian Premier League | 15 | 0 | 5 | 0 | – | | 20 | 0 |
| Career total | | | 339 | 0 | 22 | 0 | 5 | 0 | 366 | 0 |

=== International ===
As of match played 20 November 2022

Appearances and goals by national team and year
| National team | Year | Apps | Goals |
|---|---|---|---|
| Russia | 2007 | 1 | 0 |
| Russia | 2011 | 1 | 0 |
| Russia | 2019 | 1 | 0 |
| Russia | 2020 | 4 | 0 |
| Russia | 2021 | 5 | 0 |
| Russia | 2022 | 3 | 0 |
| Total | | 15 | 0 |

== Honours ==
=== Club ===
Dynamo Moscow

- FNL: 2016–17

=== Individual ===
- Dynamo Moscow player of the season: 2018–19.
- List of top 33 players in the Russian Premier League: 2011–12 (3rd place)
