= Ivan Podolyak =

Russian footballer

Personal information
- Full name: Ivan Olegovich Podolyak
- Date of birth: 4 October 1990 (age 36)
- Place of birth: Kursk, Russian SFSR
- Height: 1.82 m (6 ft 0 in)
- Positions: Midfielder; forward

Senior career*
Years	Team	Apps	(Gls)
2007–2014	FC Avangard Kursk	126	(19)
2010	→ FC Metallurg-Oskol Stary Oskol (loan)	13	(4)
2014–2017	FC Shinnik Yaroslavl	67	(7)
2017	FC Avangard Kursk	7	(1)
2018	FC Chayka Peschanokopskoye	14	(3)
2018–2019	FC Luki-Energiya Velikiye Luki	19	(3)
2019	FC Zenit-Izhevsk	15	(0)
2020–2022	FC Avangard Kursk	28	(4)
- * Club domestic league appearances and goals

Ivan Olegovich Podolyak (Russian: Иван Олегович Подоляк; born 4 October 1990) is a Russian former professional association football player.

== Club career ==
He made his Russian Football National League debut for FC Avangard Kursk on 23 August 2007 in a game against FC Ural Yekaterinburg.
