= Nikita Lapin =

Russian footballer

Personal information
- Full name: Nikita Olegovich Lapin
- Date of birth: 20 May 1993 (age 33)
- Place of birth: Stary Oskol, Russia
- Height: 1.72 m (5 ft 8 in)
- Position: Defender

Senior career*
Years	Team	Apps	(Gls)
2011–2012	FC Lokomotiv Moscow	0	(0)
2012–2013	FC Zvezda Ryazan	21	(1)
2013	FC Tyumen	4	(0)
2014	FC Volga Ulyanovsk	9	(1)
2014–2015	FC Saturn Ramenskoye	29	(3)
2015–2018	FC Khimki	86	(3)
2019	FC Baltika Kaliningrad	3	(0)

International career
2012	Russia U-19	4	(0)
- * Club domestic league appearances and goals

Nikita Olegovich Lapin (Russian: Никита Олегович Лапин; born 20 May 1993) is a Russian former football defender.

== Club career ==
He made his debut in the Russian Second Division for FC Zvezda Ryazan on 16 July 2012 in a game against FC Podolye Podolsky district.

He made his Russian Football National League debut for FC Khimki on 11 July 2016 in a game against FC Tosno.
