= Igor Leshchuk =

Russian footballer

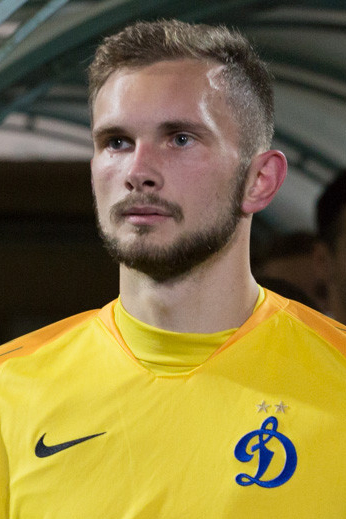
- Leshchuk with Dynamo in 2018

Personal information
- Full name: Igor Alekseyevich Leshchuk
- Date of birth: 20 February 1996 (age 30)
- Place of birth: Moscow, Russia
- Height: 1.88 m (6 ft 2 in)
- Position: Goalkeeper

Team information
- Current team: FC Dynamo Moscow
- Number: 31

Youth career
- –2019: FC Dynamo Moscow

Senior career*
Years	Team	Apps	(Gls)
2014–	FC Dynamo Moscow	48	(1)
2016–2017	→ FC Dynamo-2 Moscow	11	(0)
2020–2021	→ FC Dynamo-2 Moscow	3	(0)

International career^{‡}
2010	Russia U15	2	(0)
2010–2011	Russia U16	4	(0)
2016–2017	Russia U21	5	(0)
- * Club domestic league appearances and goals as of 22 April 2026 ‡ National team caps and goals as of 14 November 2017

Igor Alekseyevich Leshchuk (Russian: Игорь Алексеевич Лещук; born 20 February 1996) is a Russian football player who plays as goalkeeper for FC Dynamo Moscow.

== Club career ==
He made his debut in the Russian Professional Football League for FC Dynamo-2 Moscow on 28 August 2016 in a game against FSK Dolgoprudny.

He made his Russian Premier League debut for FC Dynamo Moscow on 10 August 2019, when he had to come in for injured Anton Shunin in a game against FC Zenit Saint Petersburg. He started the next 6 games as Shunin was recovering (including 2 clean sheets) and won the Dynamo fans' vote for "player of the month" for August 2019.

On 30 August 2021, he signed a new four-year contract with Dynamo. After another Shunin injury in September 2021, he kept clean sheet in 3 consecutive games and was voted as player of the month once again.

On 15 March 2023, Leshchuk saved two penalty kicks in the shootout to eliminate Russian champions Zenit St. Petersburg from the Russian Cup.

He was voted player of the month by Dynamo fans for the third time for October 2023.

On 18 January 2024, Leshchuk extended his contract with Dynamo to 2028.

On 2 December 2024, Leshchuk scored a late added-time equalizer in a 1–1 away draw against Akhmat Grozny, with a header after a corner kick. He became only the second goalkeeper in the history of the Russian Premier League (which was originally organized under a different name in 1992) to score a goal after Andrei Novosadov in 2001, and the first to not score it from a penalty kick (like Novosadov did). Before the breakup of the Soviet Union, best Russian clubs participated in the Soviet Top League, and on all occasions in that league when goalkeepers scored a goal, it was from a penalty kick. Thus Leshchuk became the first ever goalkeeper in the history of Russian football to score a non-penalty-kick goal in a top-tier club league.

== Career statistics ==
As of match played 14 October 2026

Appearances and goals by club, season and competition
Club	Season	League			Cup		Europe		Total	
Club	Season	Division	Apps	Goals	Apps	Goals	Apps	Goals	Apps	Goals
Dynamo Moscow	2014–15	Russian Premier League	0	0	0	0	0	0	0	0
Dynamo Moscow	2015–16	Russian Premier League	0	0	0	0	—		0	0
Dynamo Moscow	2016–17	Russian First League	1	0	0	0	—		1	0
Dynamo Moscow	2017–18	Russian Premier League	0	0	1	0	—		1	0
Dynamo Moscow	2018–19	Russian Premier League	0	0	2	0	—		2	0
Dynamo Moscow	2019–20	Russian Premier League	8	0	0	0	—		8	0
Dynamo Moscow	2020–21	Russian Premier League	3	0	0	0	0	0	3	0
Dynamo Moscow	2021–22	Russian Premier League	4	0	6	0	—		10	0
Dynamo Moscow	2022–23	Russian Premier League	6	0	6	0	—		12	0
Dynamo Moscow	2023–24	Russian Premier League	15	0	5	0	—		20	0
Dynamo Moscow	2024–25	Russian Premier League	5	1	6	0	—		11	1
Dynamo Moscow	2025–26	Russian Premier League	6	0	4	0	—		10	0
Dynamo Moscow	2026–27	Russian Premier League	0	0	4	0	—		4	0
Dynamo Moscow	Total		48	1	34	0	0	0	82	1
Dynamo-2 Moscow	2016–17	Russian Second League	11	0	—		—		11	0
Dynamo-2 Moscow	2020–21	Russian Second League	3	0	—		—		3	0
Career total			62	1	34	0	0	0	96	1
