= Valeri Saramutin =

Russian footballer

Personal information
- Full name: Valeri Anatolyevich Saramutin
- Date of birth: 17 May 1995 (age 31)
- Place of birth: Camden, New Jersey, United States
- Height: 1.77 m (5 ft 10 in)
- Position: Midfielder

Team information
- Current team: Match Moscow (amateur)

Youth career
- 2006–2015: Dynamo Moscow

Senior career*
Years	Team	Apps	(Gls)
2015–2017	Dynamo Moscow	2	(0)
2016–2017	→ Dynamo-2 Moscow	21	(1)
2017–2018	Dynamo Saint Petersburg	16	(1)
2018	Veles Moscow	6	(0)
2019–2020	Austin Bold	32	(1)
2021	Olimp-Dolgoprudny	6	(0)
2021–2022	Krasava	19	(1)
2022	Torpedo-2	10	(0)
2024	Tandem Moscow (amateur)		
2024–2025	Roma Moscow (amateur)		
2025–	Match Moscow (amateur)		

International career
2011	Russia U-16	1	(0)
2011–2012	Russia U-17	10	(1)
2013	Russia U-18	5	(0)
2014	Russia U-19	4	(0)
- * Club domestic league appearances and goals as of 27 August 2025

Valeri Anatolyevich Saramutin (Russian: Валерий Анатольевич Сарамутин; born 17 May 1995) is a Russian football player. He plays for amateur club Match Moscow. He also holds the United States citizenship as he was born in Camden, New Jersey.

== Club career ==
He made his debut in the Russian Football Premier League for FC Dynamo Moscow on 21 May 2016 in a game against FC Zenit Saint Petersburg. He has been on Dynamo's roster since 2012.

On 22 August 2018, he signed with Austin Bold FC in the US second-tier USL Championship. The contract was effective in the inaugural 2019 season for the team. He finished out the fall part of the 2018–19 season in the Russian third tier with FC Veles Moscow.
