= Ilya Gomanyuk =

Russian footballer

Personal information
- Full name: Ilya Sergeyevich Gomanyuk
- Date of birth: 20 May 2000 (age 26)
- Place of birth: Bryansk, Russia
- Height: 1.74 m (5 ft 9 in)
- Position: Forward

Youth career
- 2007–2010: Smena Bryansk
- 2010–2012: FC Dynamo Bryansk
- 2013–2015: Rusichi Oryol
- 2015–2021: FC Dynamo Moscow

Senior career*
Years	Team	Apps	(Gls)
2020–2022	FC Dynamo-2 Moscow	23	(6)
2021–2022	→ FC Volgar Astrakhan (loan)	4	(0)
2022–2023	FC Tver	10	(4)
2023	FC Leon Saturn Ramenskoye	1	(0)
2024–2025	FC Dynamo Bryansk	23	(1)

International career^{‡}
2015–2016	Russia U16	8	(0)
2016	Russia U17	5	(0)
2018	Russia U18	6	(0)
2019	Russia U19	2	(0)
- * Club domestic league appearances and goals as of 5 July 2025 ‡ National team caps and goals as of 26 March 2019

Ilya Sergeyevich Gomanyuk (Russian: Илья Сергеевич Гоманюк; born 20 May 2000) is a Russian football player.

== Club career ==
On 15 June 2021, he joined FC Volgar Astrakhan on loan for the 2021–22 season.

He made his debut in the Russian Football National League for FC Volgar Astrakhan on 10 July 2021 in a game against FC Orenburg.
