= Viktor Demyanov =

Russian footballer

Personal information
- Full name: Viktor Aleksandrovich Demyanov
- Date of birth: 10 June 1999 (age 27)
- Place of birth: Moscow, Russia
- Height: 1.72 m (5 ft 8 in)
- Position: Midfielder

Team information
- Current team: FC Tyumen
- Number: 56

Youth career
- –2019: FC Dynamo Moscow

Senior career*
Years	Team	Apps	(Gls)
2016–2017	FC Dynamo-2 Moscow	8	(0)
2019–2020	FC Kazanka Moscow	15	(4)
2020–2021	FC Baltika Kaliningrad	18	(0)
2021–2022	FC Volgar Astrakhan	24	(0)
2022–2023	FC Irtysh Omsk	43	(3)
2024–2026	FC Spartak Kostroma	42	(3)
2026	FC Tekstilshchik Ivanovo	18	(1)
2026–	FC Tyumen	12	(4)

International career^{‡}
2014–2015	Russia U-16	7	(0)
2016	Russia U-17	4	(0)
2017	Russia U-18	1	(0)
2017	Russia U-19	3	(0)
2017–2018	Russia U-20	9	(0)
- * Club domestic league appearances and goals as of 17 October 2026 ‡ National team caps and goals as of 15 October 2018

Viktor Aleksandrovich Demyanov (Russian: Виктор Александрович Демьянов; born 10 June 1999) is a Russian football player who plays for FC Tyumen.

== Club career ==
He made his debut in the Russian Football National League for FC Baltika Kaliningrad on 16 August 2020 in a game against FC Shinnik Yaroslavl.
