= Arena Khimki =

Football stadium in Khimki, Russia

Coordinates: 55°53′07″N 37°27′15″E

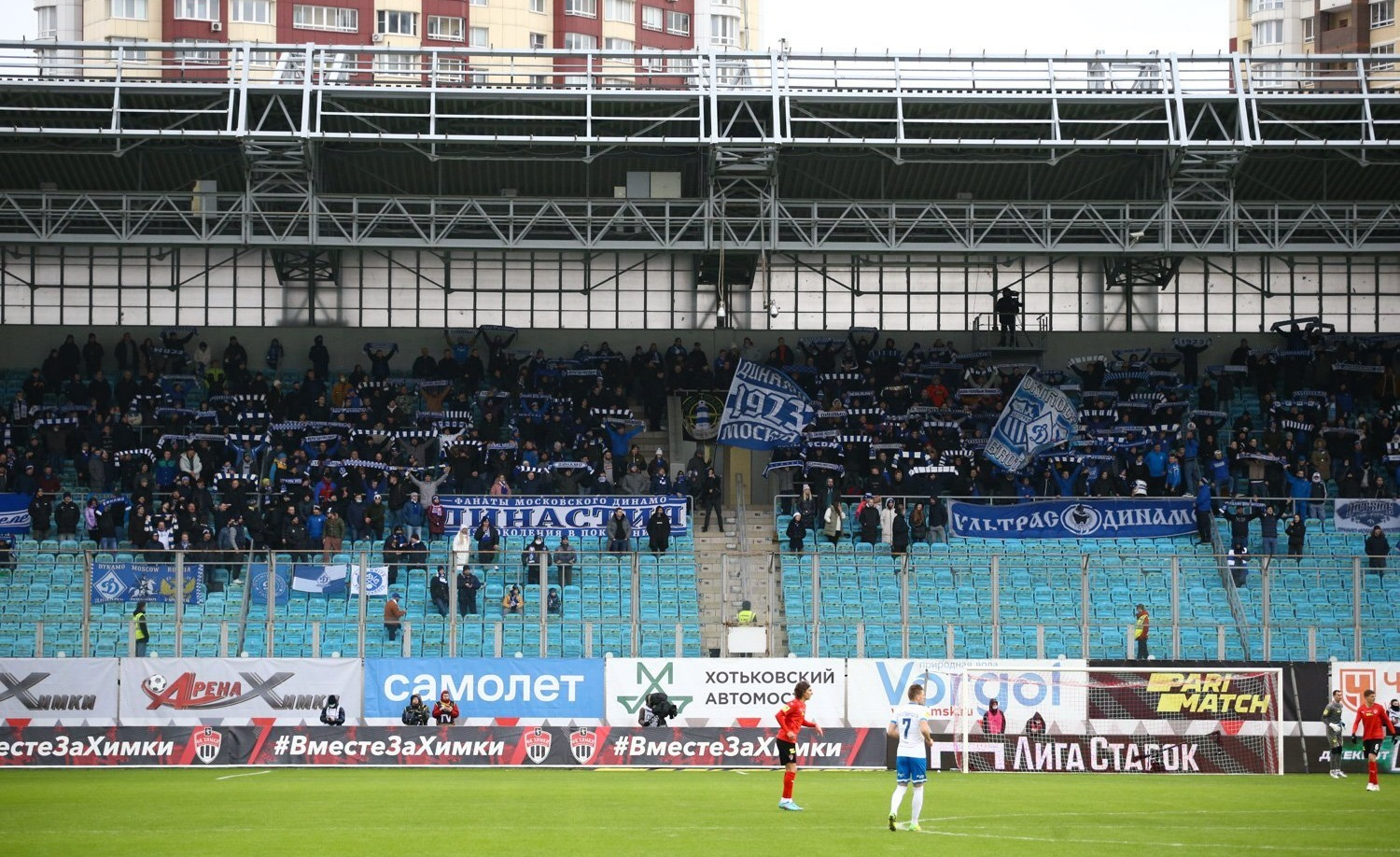
- Interactive map of Arena Khimki
- Location: Khimki, Russia
- Owner: FC Khimki
- Capacity: 18,636
- Field size: 105 x 68

Construction
- Built: 2005–2008
- Opened: 20 September 2008
- Architect: Mihailo Stupar (Maritimo Group)

Tenants
- FC Khimki (2008–2009, 2018–2025); FC Dynamo Moscow (2009–2019); PFC CSKA Moscow (2010–2016); FC Torpedo Moscow (2023–present); FC Rodina Moscow (2025–present); FC Dynamo-2 Moscow (2025–presen)

Arena Khimki (Russian: «Арена Химки») is a football stadium in Khimki, Russia. Located 300 metres north of the MKAD highway, it lies on the Moscow Oblast side of the border with Moscow. It was the home stadium of FC Khimki until that club's 2025 dissolution. FC Torpedo Moscow has held home matches at Arena Khimki since 2023 while their own stadium undergoes reconstruction. FC Rodina Moscow holds their games there since 2025.

== History ==
The stadium holds 18,636 spectators and was opened in 2008 to become the home stadium of FC Khimki. Since 2009 Dynamo Moscow have also been playing at the Arena Khimki as their home, Dynamo Stadium, has been undergoing reconstruction. When FC Khimki were relegated from the Russian Premier League, they left for Rodina Stadium and CSKA moved to the Arena Khimki from the Luzhniki.

Besides Russian Premier League matches, the Arena Khimki hosted Champions League Matches (Dynamo-Celtic), Europa League Matches, Russian Cup final in 2009 and matches of Russian national team U-21 in 2009.

CSKA moved to their own stadium in 2016, and Dynamo's was complete in 2019. FC Khimki returned to the Russian Premier League in 2018, and used the stadium as their home ground until their 2025 dissolution. FC Torpedo Moscow has been playing home matches at the stadium since 2023 while their own stadium undergoes reconstruction.

== See also ==
Other stadiums in Khimki:

- Rodina Stadium
- Novye Khimki Stadium
