= Evgeny Turbin =

Russian football referee

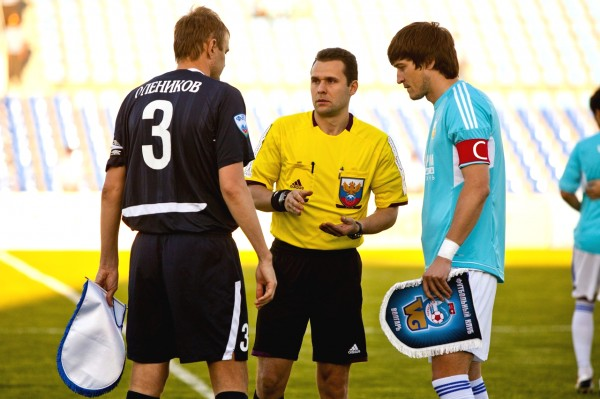
- Born: Evgeny Andreevich Turbin; September 10, 1979 (age 46); Moscow, RSFSR, USSR
- Years active: 2001 — present

Evgeny Andreevich Turbin (Russian: Евге́ний Андре́евич Турби́н; born September 10, 1979, Moscow, USSR) is a Russian football referee, has a regional category. Serves matches of the Russian Premier League.

== Career ==
Judging career Evgeny Turbin began in 2001, working as a line referee in the Russian Professional Football League. Then he worked as a line manager for the matches of the Russian Premier League doubles tournament and the Russian Cup. In 2003, Turbin became the main arbiter for the second division games, and in 2006 the first.

In the Premier League as the main arbiter debuted on November 7, 2009, in the match of the 28th round of FC Khimki — FC Tom Tomsk. The meeting ended with the victory of the guests 3:1, Turbin showed four yellow cards to the players of the hosts.
