= Ivan Zirikov =

Russian footballer

Personal information
- Full name: Ivan Mikhailovich Zirikov
- Date of birth: 6 February 1998 (age 28)
- Place of birth: Moscow, Russia
- Height: 1.89 m (6 ft 2 1/2 in)
- Position: Goalkeeper

Youth career
- –2019: Dynamo Moscow

Senior career*
| Years | Team | Apps | (Gls) |
| 2016–2017 | Dynamo-2 Moscow | 16 | (0) |
| 2019 | Dynamo Moscow | 0 | (0) |
| 2019–2020 | Tekstilshchik Ivanovo | 7 | (0) |
| 2024 | Dynamo St. Petersburg | 13 | (0) |

International career
| 2013–2014 | Russia U16 | 2 | (0) |
- * Club domestic league appearances and goals as of 3 November 2024

Ivan Mikhailovich Zirikov (Russian: Иван Михайлович Зириков; born 6 February 1998) is a Russian football player.

== Club career ==
He made his debut in the Russian Professional Football League for Dynamo-2 Moscow on 20 July 2016 in a game against Tekstilshchik Ivanovo.

He made his Russian Football National League debut for Tekstilshchik Ivanovo on 7 July 2019 in a game against Yenisey Krasnoyarsk.

== International ==
He was on the roster of the Russia national under-17 football team for 2015 FIFA U-17 World Cup, but did not play in any games at the tournament.

== Personal life ==
His younger brother Nikolay Zirikov is also a football goalkeeper.
