= Ivan Temnikov =

Russian footballer

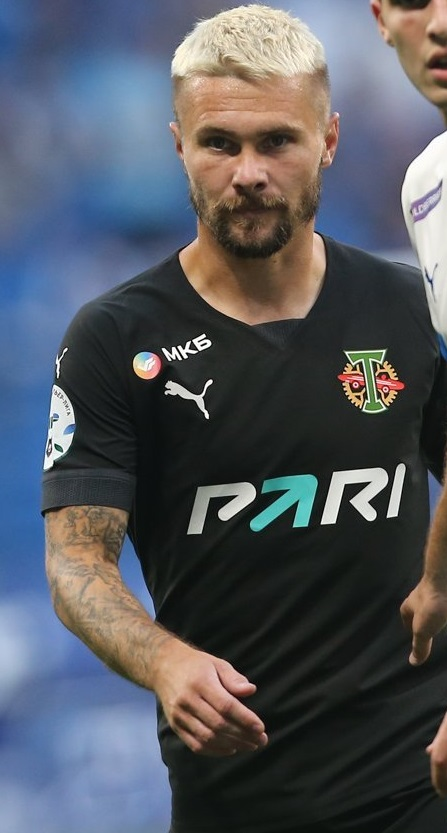
- Temnikov with Torpedo Moscow in 2022

Personal information
- Full name: Ivan Viktorovich Temnikov
- Date of birth: 28 January 1989 (age 37)
- Place of birth: Bratsk, Irkutsk, Soviet Union
- Height: 1.70 m (5 ft 7 in)
- Position: Right-back

Team information
- Current team: Saturn Ramenskoye (assistant coach)

Youth career
- 1999–2002: Sibiryak Bratsk
- 2003–2004: Master-Saturn Yegoryevsk
- 2005–2006: Saturn Ramenskoye

Senior career*
| Years | Team | Apps | (Gls) |
| 2006–2010 | Saturn Ramenskoye | 5 | (0) |
| 2010 | → Ural (loan) | 26 | (2) |
| 2011–2012 | Dynamo Bryansk | 45 | (1) |
| 2012–2014 | Rubin | 1 | (0) |
| 2013–2014 | → Terek Grozny (loan) | 11 | (0) |
| 2014–2016 | Tom Tomsk | 64 | (4) |
| 2016–2019 | Dynamo Moscow | 55 | (7) |
| 2019–2021 | Nizhny Novgorod | 52 | (2) |
| 2021–2022 | Torpedo Moscow | 34 | (3) |
| 2022–2023 | Ufa | 23 | (3) |
| 2023–2025 | Kuban Krasnodar | 43 | (2) |
| 2025–2026 | Titan Moscow (amateur) | | |

International career
| 2010 | Russia U-21 | 2 | (0) |
| 2012 | Russia-2 | 1 | (0) |

Managerial career
- 2026–: Saturn Ramenskoye (assistant)
- * Club domestic league appearances and goals

Ivan Viktorovich Temnikov (Russian: Иван Викторович Темников; born 28 January 1989) is a Russian football coach and a former player who played as a right back. He is an assistant coach for Saturn Ramenskoye.

== Career ==
Temnikov primarily plays as a right defender or right midfielder. He made his professional debut in the Russian Premier League for Saturn Ramenskoye on 14 July 2007 in a game against Luch-Energiya Vladivostok. After spells at Yekaterinburg and Bryansk Temnikov signed for Rubin, but made only 1 league appearance and went to Grozny on loan, initially for 6 months. Later loan agreement was extended, and Temnikov stayed at Terek for the second part of 2013–14 season.

On 4 July 2019, he left Dynamo Moscow by mutual consent.

=== Career statistics ===
As of 27 November 2022

| Club | Season | League | | | Cup | | Continental | | Other | | Total | |
| Club | Season | Division | Apps | Goals | Apps | Goals | Apps | Goals | Apps | Goals | Apps | Goals |
|---|---|---|---|---|---|---|---|---|---|---|---|---|
| Saturn Ramenskoye | 2006 | Premier League | 0 | 0 | 1 | 0 | – | | – | | 1 | 0 |
| Saturn Ramenskoye | 2007 | Premier League | 2 | 0 | 1 | 0 | – | | – | | 3 | 0 |
| Saturn Ramenskoye | 2008 | Premier League | 0 | 0 | 0 | 0 | 0 | 0 | – | | 0 | 0 |
| Saturn Ramenskoye | 2009 | Premier League | 3 | 0 | 1 | 0 | – | | – | | 4 | 0 |
| Saturn Ramenskoye | Total | | 5 | 0 | 3 | 0 | 0 | 0 | 0 | 0 | 8 | 0 |
| Ural Yekaterinburg | 2010 | First League | 26 | 2 | 1 | 1 | – | | – | | 27 | 3 |
| Dynamo Bryansk | 2011–12 | First League | 45 | 1 | 2 | 1 | – | | – | | 47 | 2 |
| Rubin Kazan | 2012–13 | Premier League | 1 | 0 | 1 | 0 | 0 | 0 | – | | 2 | 0 |
| Terek Grozny | 2013–14 | Premier League | 11 | 0 | 1 | 0 | – | | – | | 12 | 0 |
| Tom Tomsk | 2014–15 | First League | 29 | 1 | 1 | 0 | – | | 5 (Note: Four appearances, one goal in the FNL Cup, one appearance in promotion play-offs) | 1 | 35 | 2 |
| Tom Tomsk | 2015–16 | First League | 35 | 3 | 1 | 0 | – | | 5 (Note: Three appearances in the FNL Cup, two appearances in promotion play-offs) | 0 | 41 | 3 |
| Tom Tomsk | Total | | 64 | 4 | 2 | 0 | 0 | 0 | 10 | 1 | 76 | 5 |
| Dynamo Moscow | 2016–17 | First League | 31 | 7 | 2 | 1 | – | | – | | 33 | 8 |
| Dynamo Moscow | 2017–18 | Premier League | 19 | 0 | 0 | 0 | – | | – | | 19 | 0 |
| Dynamo Moscow | 2018–19 | Premier League | 5 | 0 | 2 | 0 | – | | – | | 7 | 0 |
| Dynamo Moscow | Total | | 55 | 7 | 4 | 1 | 0 | 0 | 0 | 0 | 59 | 8 |
| Nizhny Novgorod | 2019–20 | First League | 20 | 2 | 1 | 0 | – | | – | | 21 | 2 |
| Nizhny Novgorod | 2020–21 | First League | 32 | 0 | 2 | 0 | – | | – | | 34 | 0 |
| Nizhny Novgorod | Total | | 52 | 2 | 3 | 0 | 0 | 0 | 0 | 0 | 55 | 2 |
| Torpedo Moscow | 2021–22 | First League | 30 | 3 | 1 | 0 | – | | – | | 31 | 3 |
| Torpedo Moscow | 2022–23 | Premier League | 4 | 0 | 0 | 0 | – | | – | | 4 | 0 |
| Torpedo Moscow | Total | | 34 | 3 | 1 | 0 | 0 | 0 | 0 | 0 | 35 | 3 |
| Ufa | 2022–23 | First League | 11 | 3 | 3 | 0 | – | | – | | 14 | 3 |
| Career total | | | 304 | 22 | 21 | 3 | 0 | 0 | 10 | 1 | 335 | 26 |

== Honours ==
Torpedo Moscow

- Russian Football National League : 2021-22
