= Vladimir Moskalyov =

Russian football referee (born 1986)

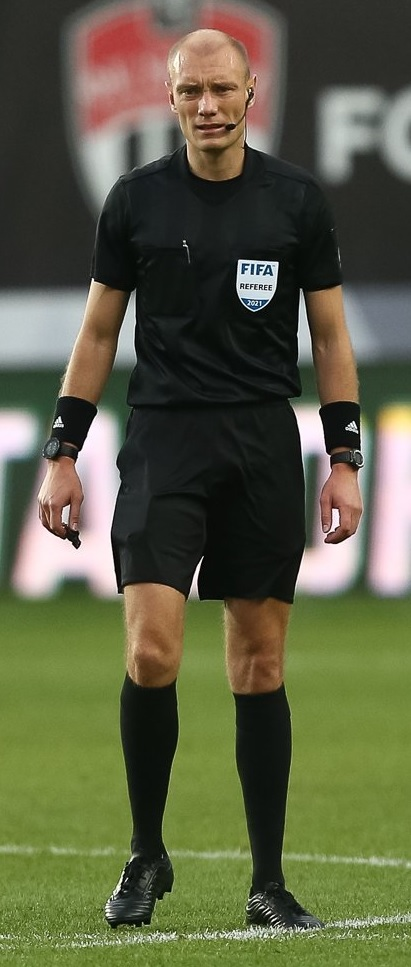
- Moskalyov in 2021
- Full name: Vladimir Viktorovich Moskalyov
- Born: 3 September 1986 (age 40); Voronezh, Russian SFSR

Domestic
| Years | League | Role |
| 2014– | Russian Premier League | Referee |

International
| Years | League | Role |
| 2019– | FIFA | Referee |

Vladimir Viktorovich Moskalyov (Russian: Владимир Викторович Москалёв; born 3 September 1986) is a Russian football referee.

== Career ==
Moskalyov played for the youth teams of his native city but was forced to stop at age 15 due to injury. He then began to referee.

In 2014, he was the youngest referee in the Russian Premier League. The first match in the Premier League which he refereed was on 30 August 2014 between Mordovia and Torpedo, in which he showed 9 yellow cards, one of which was the second for that player.

In the entire 2014–15 season, he refereed 14 games, which showed 52 yellow cards, of which 4 are on the second, 2 red cards, and 5 appointed penalties.

In 2015–16 he worked 22 games.

He became a FIFA referee in 2019.
