= Anatoli Katrich =

Russian footballer

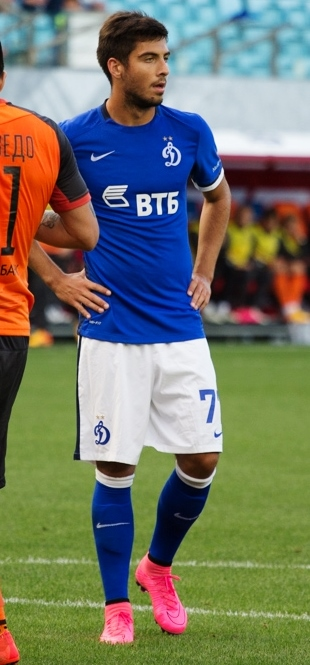
- Katrich with Dynamo Moscow in 2015

Personal information
- Full name: Anatoli Nikolayevich Katrich
- Date of birth: 9 July 1994 (age 32)
- Place of birth: Primorsko-Akhtarsk, Russia
- Height: 1.77 m (5 ft 10 in)
- Position: Midfielder

Youth career
- –2006: DYuSSh Azovets Primorsko-Akhtarsk
- 2006–: SDYuSShOR-5 Krasnodar
- Dynamo Moscow

Senior career*
Years	Team	Apps	(Gls)
2014–2018	Dynamo Moscow	45	(2)
2018	Krasnodar	0	(0)
2018	→ Krasnodar-2	18	(1)
2019	Ural Yekaterinburg	1	(0)
2019	→ Ural-2 Yekaterinburg	4	(2)
2019	Luch Vladivostok	13	(0)
2020	Krasnodar-2	3	(0)
2020	Krasnodar-3	8	(4)
2021	Tekstilshchik Ivanovo	6	(0)
2022	Atyrau	10	(0)
2022–2025	Amkal Moscow (amateur)		
- * Club domestic league appearances and goals as of 21 May 2022

Anatoli Nikolayevich Katrich (Russian: Анатолий Николаевич Катрич; born 9 July 1994) is a Russian professional football player who plays as right midfielder.

== Club career ==
Katrich made his professional debut on 12 April 2015 for Dynamo Moscow in a Russian Premier League game against Mordovia Saransk.

On 8 July 2018, he signed a 1-year contract with Krasnodar. After he made only one Cup appearance for the main squad in the first half of the season, his contract was dissolved by mutual consent on 20 December 2018.

On 22 February 2019, Katrich signed with Ural Yekaterinburg. He left Ural on 7 June 2019.

== Career statistics ==
As of 22 August 2023

Club	Season	League			Cup		Continental		Other		Total	
Club	Season	Division	Apps	Goals	Apps	Goals	Apps	Goals	Apps	Goals	Apps	Goals
Dynamo Moscow	2014–15	Russian Premier League	4	0	0	0	0	0	–		4	0
Dynamo Moscow	2015–16	Russian Premier League	6	0	1	0	–		–		7	0
Dynamo Moscow	2016–17	Russian First League	31	2	2	0	–		–		33	2
Dynamo Moscow	2017–18	Russian Premier League	4	0	1	0	–		–		5	0
Dynamo Moscow	Total		45	2	4	0	0	0	0	0	49	2
Krasnodar	2018–19	Russian Premier League	0	0	1	0	0	0	–		1	0
Krasnodar-2	2018–19	Russian First League	18	1	–		–		–		18	1
Ural Yekaterinburg	2018–19	Russian Premier League	1	0	0	0	–		2 (Note: Appearances in the FNL Cup)	2	3	2
Ural-2 Yekaterinburg	2018–19	Russian Second League	4	2	–		–		–		4	2
Luch Vladivostok	2019–20	Russian First League	13	0	2	0	–		–		15	0
Krasnodar-2	2019–20	Russian First League	1	0	–		–		–		1	0
Krasnodar-2	2020–21	Russian First League	2	0	–		–		–		2	0
Krasnodar-2	Total		3	0	0	0	0	0	0	0	3	0
Krasnodar-3	2020–21	Russian Second League	8	4	–		–		–		8	4
Tekstilshchik Ivanovo	2020–21	Russian First League	6	0	–		–		–		6	0
Atyrau	2022	Kazakhstan Premier League	10	0	0	0	–		–		10	0
Amkal Moscow	2023–24	Media Football League	–		2	1	–		–		2	1
Career total			108	9	9	1	0	0	2	2	119	12
