= Pavel Lelyukhin =

Russian footballer

Personal information
- Full name: Pavel Dmitriyevich Lelyukhin
- Date of birth: 23 April 1998 (age 28)
- Place of birth: Moscow, Russia
- Height: 1.86 m (6 ft 1 in)
- Position: Centre back

Youth career
- –2015: Spartak Moscow
- 2015–2016: Dynamo Moscow
- 2018: Spartak Moscow

Senior career*
| Years | Team | Apps | (Gls) |
| 2016–2018 | Dynamo-2 Moscow | 14 | (3) |
| 2017–2018 | → Spartak-2 Moscow (loan) | 5 | (0) |
| 2018–2021 | Pafos | 25 | (0) |
| 2021 | Yessentuki | 8 | (0) |

International career
| 2015 | Russia U17 | 1 | (0) |
| 2016 | Russia U18 | 10 | (2) |
| 2016 | Russia U19 | 5 | (0) |
| 2018–2019 | Russia U20 | 6 | (0) |
- * Club domestic league appearances and goals

Pavel Dmitriyevich Lelyukhin (Russian: Павел Дмитриевич Лелюхин; born 23 April 1998) is a Russian former football player.

== Club career ==
He made his debut in the Russian Professional Football League for FC Dynamo-2 Moscow on 20 July 2016 in a game against FC Tekstilshchik Ivanovo. Lelyukhin played in the Russian Football National League with FC Spartak-2 Moscow.

On 4 September 2018 he signed with the Cypriot club Pafos.

== International ==
He was on the roster for the Russia national under-17 football team at the 2015 FIFA U-17 World Cup, but did not play in any games at the tournament.

== Career statistics ==
As of match played 3 July

Appearances and goals by club, season and competition
| Club | Season | League | | | Cup | | Continental | | Other | | Total | |
| Club | Season | Division | Apps | Goals | Apps | Goals | Apps | Goals | Apps | Goals | Apps | Goals |
|---|---|---|---|---|---|---|---|---|---|---|---|---|
| Pafos | 2018–19 | Cypriot First Division | 8 | 0 | 3 | 0 | — | | — | | 11 | 0 |
| Pafos | 2019–20 | Cypriot First Division | 10 | 0 | 2 | 0 | — | | — | | 12 | 0 |
| Pafos | Total | | 18 | 0 | 5 | 0 | 0 | 0 | 0 | 0 | 23 | 0 |
| Career Total | | | 18 | 0 | 5 | 0 | 0 | 0 | 0 | 0 | 23 | 0 |
