= 2011–12 FC Kuban Krasnodar season =

Kuban Krasnodar
2011–12 season
- Chairman: Aleksandr Tkachyov
- Manager: Dan Petrescu
- Stadium: Kuban Stadium
- Russian Premier League: 8th
- Russian Cup: Round of 32 vs Dynamo Bryansk
- Top goalscorer: League: Lacina Traoré (17); All: Lacina Traoré (17)
- Highest home attendance: 31,527 vs Anzhi Makhachkala (18 September 2011)
- Lowest home attendance: 31,527 vs Krylia Sovetov (22 October 2011)
- Average home league attendance: 20,987
Home colours	Away colours

The 2011–12 FC Kuban Krasnodar season was the first season back in the Russian Premier League, the highest tier of football in Russia, following relegation to the Russian National Football League at the end of the 2009 season. Kuban finished the season in 8th position, their best ever finish, whilst also reaching the Round of 32 in the Russian Cup, where they were defeated by Dynamo Bryansk.

== Squad ==
Note: Flags indicate national team as defined under FIFA eligibility rules; some limited exceptions apply. Players may hold more than one non-FIFA nationality.

No.	Pos.	Nation	Player
1	GK	MDA	Stanislav Namașco
2	DF	MDA	Igor Armaș
4	DF	RUS	Boris Rotenberg (on loan from Dynamo Moscow)
6	MF	RUS	David Tsorayev
7	MF	RUS	Vladislav Kulik
8	MF	RUS	Artur Tlisov
9	MF	RUS	Nikolai Zhilyayev
11	FW	ROU	Gheorghe Bucur
14	MF	RUS	Aleksei Ionov
15	DF	BLR	Maksim Zhavnerchik
17	MF	RUS	Artyom Fidler
18	DF	RUS	Anton Rogochiy

No.	Pos.	Nation	Player
20	FW	CIV	Lacina Traoré
21	FW	CRC	Marco Ureña
22	MF	RUS	Anton Sosnin
23	GK	RUS	Aleksandr Belenov
25	DF	RUS	Aleksei Kozlov
26	DF	BRA	Zelão (C)
27	DF	CIV	Igor Lolo
30	FW	ARM	Marcos Pizzelli
33	GK	RUS	Bogdan Karyukin
37	MF	RUS	Mikhail Komkov
43	DF	RUS	Roman Bugayev
90	FW	RUS	Anton Sekret

== Transfers ==
=== Winter 2010–11 ===
In: Note: Flags indicate national team as defined under FIFA eligibility rules; some limited exceptions apply. Players may hold more than one non-FIFA nationality.

No.	Pos.	Nation	Player
4	DF	URU	Mauricio Prieto (loan from (Uruguay) River Plate)
6	MF	RUS	David Tsorayev (from (Russia) Anzhi Makhachkala)
17	MF	RUS	Artyom Fidler (from (Russia) Ural Sverdlovsk Oblast)
20	FW	CIV	Lacina Traoré (from (Romania) CFR Cluj)
21	FW	CRC	Marco Ureña (from (Costa Rica) Alajuelense)
22	MF	RUS	Igor Paderin (from (Russia) Torpedo Vladimir)
26	DF	BRA	Zelão (from (Russia) Saturn Moscow Oblast)
32	DF	ANG	Francisco Zuela (end of loan to (Greece) PAOK)
40	MF	ROU	Dacian Varga (on loan from (Romania) Sportul Studenţesc)
44	DF	RUS	Ivan Knyazev
45	MF	RUS	Aleksandr Karibov
50	DF	RUS	Rustam Kokoskeriya
55	MF	RUS	Arkadi Kalaydzhyan (from (Russia) Lokomotiv Moscow)
57	GK	RUS	Eduard Baychora
69	MF	RUS	Ivan Gagloyev
71	MF	RUS	Bunyamudin Mustafayev
72	DF	RUS	Maksim Kovalchuk
73	MF	RUS	Yevgeni Kurdus
75	DF	RUS	Sergei Drampov
77	MF	RUS	Tavakkyul Mamedov
79	DF	RUS	Radomir Ponomaryov
81	GK	RUS	Aleksandr Rudenko
87	MF	RUS	Ilya Maksimov (from (Russia) Nizhny Novgorod)
88	MF	RUS	Aleksandr Nesterenko
90	FW	RUS	Anton Sekret (from (Russia) Krasnodar-2000)
91	FW	RUS	Yevgeni Kasyanov
92	MF	RUS	Ruslan Slinko
93	MF	RUS	Kakha Khalvashi
94	DF	RUS	Aleksandr Kaglyuk
96	MF	RUS	Maksim Malysh
97	MF	RUS	Vladimir Lobkaryov

Out: Note: Flags indicate national team as defined under FIFA eligibility rules; some limited exceptions apply. Players may hold more than one non-FIFA nationality.

No.	Pos.	Nation	Player
3	DF	MDA	Victor Golovatenco (to (Russia) Sibir Novosibirsk)
5	DF	RUS	Anton Grigoryev (end of loan from (Russia) CSKA Moscow)
6	MF	UKR	Dmitriy Gorbushin (to (Russia) Chernomorets Novorossiysk)
14	MF	RUS	Renat Baratov (to (Russia) Torpedo Armavir)
17	FW	MNE	Nikola Nikezić (released)
20	MF	RUS	Anton Kiselyov (to (Russia) SKA-Energiya Khabarovsk)
21	DF	RUS	Anton Lunin (released)
23	DF	RUS	Oleg Malyukov (to (Russia) Salyut Belgorod)
27	MF	RUS	Maksim Shevchenko (to (Russia) Volgar-Gazprom Astrakhan)
70	GK	RUS	Aleksei Chuyev (released)
87	MF	RUS	Vladislav Ignatyev (end of loan from (Russia) Lokomotiv Moscow)
91	DF	RUS	Vitali Shakhov (to (Russia) Torpedo Armavir)
99	FW	RUS	Rustem Kalimullin (to (Russia) Dynamo Bryansk)
—	DF	RUS	Viktor Dmitrenko (loan to (Russia) Torpedo Armavir, previously on loan to (Moldova) Zimbru Chişinău)
—	DF	SRB	Sreten Sretenović (to (Slovenia) Olimpija Ljubljana, previously on loan to (Portugal) Leixões)
—	MF	RUS	Azat Bairyyev (on loan to (Russia) Dynamo Bryansk, previously on loan to (Russia) Salyut Belgorod)

=== Summer 2011 ===
In: Note: Flags indicate national team as defined under FIFA eligibility rules; some limited exceptions apply. Players may hold more than one non-FIFA nationality.

No.	Pos.	Nation	Player
5	DF	RUS	Sergei Bendz (from (Russia) Volga Nizhny Novgorod)
23	GK	RUS	Aleksandr Belenov (from (Russia) Spartak Moscow)
27	DF	CIV	Igor Lolo (from (France) AS Monaco)
28	FW	SVK	František Kubík (from (Slovakia) AS Trenčín)
37	MF	RUS	Mikhail Komkov (from (Russia) Krasnodar)
61	FW	RUS	Artyom Gevorkyan
62	DF	RUS	Sergei Khachaturyan
63	FW	RUS	Roman Dromenko
99	MF	RUS	Vladislav Ryzhkov (from (Russia) Zhemchuzhina-Sochi)

Out: Note: Flags indicate national team as defined under FIFA eligibility rules; some limited exceptions apply. Players may hold more than one non-FIFA nationality.

No.	Pos.	Nation	Player
1	GK	MDA	Stanislav Namașco (loan to (Russia) Spartak Nalchik)
4	DF	URU	Mauricio Prieto (end of loan from (Uruguay) River Plate)
19	MF	BLR	Aleksey Skvernyuk (to (Russia) Spartak Nalchik)
22	MF	RUS	Igor Paderin (to (Russia) Amkar Perm)
32	DF	ANG	Francisco Zuela (on loan to (Greece) Atromitos)
42	DF	RUS	Sergei Gorelov (to (Russia) Torpedo Armavir)
51	DF	RUS	Eduard Tatoyan (released)
77	MF	RUS	Tavakkyul Mamedov (to (Russia) Torpedo Armavir)
87	MF	RUS	Ilya Maksimov (to (Russia) Volga Nizhny Novgorod)

=== Winter 2011–12 ===
In: Note: Flags indicate national team as defined under FIFA eligibility rules; some limited exceptions apply. Players may hold more than one non-FIFA nationality.

No.	Pos.	Nation	Player
1	GK	MDA	Stanislav Namașco (end of loan to (Russia) Spartak Nalchik)
4	DF	RUS	Boris Rotenberg (on loan from (Russia) Dynamo Moscow)
14	MF	RUS	Aleksei Ionov (from (Russia) Zenit Saint Petersburg)
22	MF	RUS	Anton Sosnin (from (Russia) Krylia Sovetov Samara)
30	FW	ARM	Marcos Pizzelli (from (Ukraine) Metalurh Donetsk)
45	MF	RUS	Sergei Zozulya
46	MF	RUS	Giorg Ubilava
72	DF	RUS	Maksim Pereverzev
73	MF	RUS	Sergei Arzumanov
77	MF	RUS	Levon Konoplyov
—	MF	UKR	Dmitriy Gorbushin (end of loan to (Russia) Chernomorets Novorossiysk)

Out: Note: Flags indicate national team as defined under FIFA eligibility rules; some limited exceptions apply. Players may hold more than one non-FIFA nationality.

No.	Pos.	Nation	Player
5	DF	RUS	Sergei Bendz (on loan to (Russia) Volga Nizhny Novgorod)
10	FW	RUS	Sergei Davydov (to (Russia) Rubin Kazan)
28	FW	SVK	František Kubík (to (Ukraine) Tavriya Simferopol)
30	MF	CIV	Marco Né (to (Ukraine) Tavriya Simferopol)
40	MF	ROU	Dacian Varga (end of loan from (Romania) Sportul Studențesc)
45	MF	RUS	Aleksandr Karibov (to (Russia) Torpedo Armavir)
72	DF	RUS	Maksim Kovalchuk (released)
73	MF	RUS	Yevgeni Kurdus (to (Russia) Torpedo Armavir)
98	GK	RUS	Aleksandr Budakov (to (Russia) Spartak Nalchik)
99	MF	RUS	Vladislav Ryzhkov (released)
—	DF	RUS	Azat Bairyyev (to (Russia) Alania Vladikavkaz, previously on loan to (Russia) Dynamo Bryansk)
—	DF	RUS	Viktor Dmitrenko (to (Kazakhstan) Astana, previously on loan to (Russia) Torpedo Armavir)

== Competitions ==
=== Russian Premier League ===
==== First phase ====
===== Matches =====
13 March 2011 1	Kuban Krasnodar	0–2	Rubin Kazan	Krasnodar
15:00 MSK (UTC+4)	Rogochiy (yellow card) 88'	Summary	Bocchetti (yellow card) 38'; Kasaev 52'; Noboa 88' (pen.)	Stadium: Kuban Stadium; Attendance: 16,000; Referee: Mikhail Vilkov

20 March 2011 2	Tom Tomsk	0–1	Kuban Krasnodar	Tomsk
13:00 MSK (UTC+4)	Bazhenov (yellow card) 72'; Klimov (yellow card) 72'	Summary	Tlisov (yellow card) 65'; Zelão (yellow card) 72'; Davydov 83'	Stadium: Trud Stadium; Attendance: 10,200; Referee: Alexey Nikolaev

2 April 2011 3	Kuban Krasnodar	3–1	Spartak Moscow	Krasnodar
20:45 MSK (UTC+4)	Kulik (yellow card) 10' (goal) 58'; Armaș (yellow card) 29'; Zhavnerchik (yellow card) 33'; Traoré 45' (pen.); Tsorayev (yellow card) 52'; Varga (yellow card) 77'; Davydov 88'	Summary	Alex (yellow card) 42'; Sheshukov (yellow card) 45'; Ibson 49' (yellow card) 90+4'; Carioca (yellow card) 90+1'	Stadium: Kuban Stadium; Attendance: 26,000; Referee: Igor Egorov

9 April 2011 4	Dynamo Moscow	1–0	Kuban Krasnodar	Moscow
18:30 MSK (UTC+4)	Semshov (yellow card) 3' (goal) 83'; Fernández (yellow card) 72'; Wilkshire (yellow card) 76'	Summary	Davydov (yellow card) 56'; Skvernyuk (yellow card) 81'	Stadium: Arena Khimki; Attendance: 5,512; Referee: Sergey Karasev

16 April 2011 5	Kuban Krasnodar	2–0	Rostov	Krasnodar
16:15 MSK (UTC+4)	Traoré 9'; Zelão 35'; Kozlov (yellow card) 42' (yellow-red card) 60'	Summary	Yankov (yellow card) 24'; Boussaidi (yellow card) 43'; Khokhlov (yellow card) 56'; Khagush (yellow card) 79'; Grigoryev (yellow card) 81'	Stadium: Kuban Stadium; Attendance: 15,600; Referee: Maxim Layushkin

23 April 2011 6	Volga Nizhny Novgorod	0–1	Kuban Krasnodar	Nizhny Novgorod
14:00 MSK (UTC+4)		Summary	Bugayev (yellow card) 37'; Kulik 72'	Stadium: Lokomotiv Stadium; Attendance: 12,300; Referee: Yuri Baskakov

30 April 2011 7	Lokomotiv Moscow	2–1	Kuban Krasnodar	Moscow
18:30 MSK (UTC+4)	Maicon 6'; Loskov (yellow card) 52'; Ibričić 62'; Ozdoyev (yellow card) 62'; Shishkin (yellow card) 90+1'	Summary	Varga (yellow card) 48'; Bucur (yellow card) 64'; Traoré 83'; Zelão (yellow card) 26' (red card) 90+5'	Stadium: Lokomotiv Stadium; Attendance: 12,764; Referee: Vladislav Bezborodov

7 May 2011 8	Kuban Krasnodar	2–1	Terek Grozny	Krasnodar
15:00 MSK (UTC+4)	Varga 19' (pen.); Tsorayev (yellow card) 74'; Davydov 90'	Summary	Dzhanayev (yellow card) 18'; Kobenko (yellow card) 33'; Amelyanchuk (yellow card) 59' (yellow-red card) 72'; Zengue 90+2'	Stadium: Kuban Stadium; Attendance: 15,000; Referee: Vitaly Meshkov

13 May 2011 9	Anzhi Makhachkala	0–0	Kuban Krasnodar	Mahachkala
18:30 MSK (UTC+4)	Kébé (yellow card) 90+2'	Summary	Zhavnerchik (yellow card) 41'; Tsorayev (yellow card) 60'	Stadium: Dinamo Stadium; Attendance: 15,200; Referee: Sergey Karasev

20 May 2011 10	Kuban Krasnodar	1–1	Spartak Nalchik	Krasnodar
18:15 MSK (UTC+4)	Tsorayev (yellow card) 45+1'; Bucur 64'	Summary	Jovanović (yellow card) 38'; Berkhamov (yellow card) 66'; Leandro 87'	Stadium: Kuban Stadium; Attendance: 15,400; Referee: Timur Arslanbekov

29 May 2011 11	CSKA Moscow	1–1	Kuban Krasnodar	Khimki
19:00 MSK (UTC+4)	Mamayev (yellow card) 63'; Necid 67'	Summary	Kozlov (yellow card) 73'; Davydov 80'; Zhavnerchik (yellow card) 90+1'	Stadium: Arena Khimki; Attendance: 8,150; Referee: Aleksandr Egorov

10 June 2011 12	Kuban Krasnodar	3–2	Amkar Perm	Krasnodar
18:45 MSK (UTC+4)	Traoré 43', 66' (yellow card) 60'; Maksimov (yellow card) 57'; Varga (yellow card) 70'; Bucur 88'	Summary	Belorukov 29'; Burmistrov 51'; Popov (yellow card) 66'	Stadium: Kuban Stadium; Attendance: 12,800; Referee: Sergey Lapochkin

14 June 2011 13	Krylia Sovetov	1–0	Kuban Krasnodar	Samara
19:30 MSK (UTC+4)	Pečnik 59'	Summary	Paderin (yellow card) 79'; Budakov (yellow card) 86'; Traoré (yellow card) 90+2'	Stadium: Metallurg Stadium; Attendance: 11,100; Referee: Maxim Layushkin

18 June 2011 14	Kuban Krasnodar	0–1	Krasnodar	Krasnodar
20:00 MSK (UTC+4)	Armaș (yellow card) 56' (yellow-red card) 88'; Kozlov (yellow card) 59'; Varga (yellow card) 70'; Né (yellow card) 90+2'	Summary	Drinčić 67'; Tubić (red card) 56'; Gorodov (yellow card) 90'	Stadium: Kuban Stadium; Attendance: 25,840; Referee: Stanislav Sukhina

22 June 2011 15	Zenit St.Petersburg	1–0	Kuban Krasnodar	Saint Petersburg
21:00 MSK (UTC+4)	Luković (yellow card) 25'; Zyryanov 35'	Summary	Kozlov (yellow card) 20'	Stadium: Petrovsky Stadium; Attendance: 20,200; Referee: Mikhail Vilkov

25 June 2011 16	Rubin Kazan	0–2	Kuban Krasnodar	Kazan
18:45 MSK (UTC+4)	Nemov (yellow card) 11'; Ryzhikov (yellow card) 35'; Navas (yellow card) 47'; Ansaldi (yellow card) 79'; Kasaev (yellow card) 82'	Summary	Varga (yellow card) 27'; Armaș (yellow card) 41'; Zelão 53' (yellow card) 54'; Bucur 69'; Budakov (yellow card) 69'	Stadium: Central Stadium; Attendance: 17,120; Referee: Igor Egorov

22 July 2011 17	Kuban Krasnodar	1–3	Tom Tomsk	Krasnodar
20:00 MSK (UTC+4)	Davydov 59' (pen.); Zelão (yellow card) 71'	Summary	Smirnov 37'; Pesyakov (yellow card) 58'; Golyshev 62', 72' (pen.)	Stadium: Kuban Stadium; Attendance: 15,000; Referee: Yuri Baskakov

30 July 2011 18	Spartak Moscow	1–1	Kuban Krasnodar	Moscow
20:00 MSK (UTC+4)	Welliton 52'; Rodri (yellow card) 71'; Suchý (yellow card) 82'	Summary	Traoré 37' (pen.); Bucur (yellow card) 74'; Tlisov (yellow card) 80'	Stadium: Luzhniki Stadium; Attendance: 10,793; Referee: Vitaly Meshkov

6 August 2011 19	Kuban Krasnodar	3–1	Dynamo Moscow	Krasnodar
21:00 MSK (UTC+4)	Bugayev (yellow card) 14'; Davydov 45', 64' (yellow card) 64'; Zelão (yellow card) 57'; Bucur (yellow card) 61'; Komkov 72'	Summary	Semshov (yellow card) 57'; Kurányi 59'	Stadium: Kuban Stadium; Attendance: 18,220; Referee: Igor Egorov

13 August 2011 20	Rostov	1–2	Kuban Krasnodar	Rostov-on-Don
21:00 MSK (UTC+4)	Adamov (yellow card) 37'; Bracamonte 57'; Ivanov (yellow card) 80'	Summary	Zelão 23'; Bugayev (yellow card) 32'; Fidler (yellow card) 61'; Né 63'; Komkov (yellow card) 88'	Stadium: Olimp – 2 Attendance: 11,000; Referee: Sergey Karasev

21 August 2011 21	Kuban Krasnodar	5–0	Volga Nizhny Novgorod	Krasnodar
20:00 MSK (UTC+4)	Komkov (yellow card) 4' (goal) 70'; Traoré 20', 45+1'; Bucur 53'; Kubík (yellow card) 78'; Davydov 89'	Summary	Getigezhev (yellow card) 45'; Arziani (yellow card) 52'; Grigalava (yellow card) 69'; Javadov (yellow card) 77'	Stadium: Kuban Stadium; Attendance: 14,000; Referee: Timur Arslanbekov

28 August 2011 22	Kuban Krasnodar	0–1	Lokomotiv Moscow	Krasnodar
21:00 MSK (UTC+4)	Bendz (yellow card) 27'; Traoré (yellow card) 34'; Bucur (yellow card) 40'; Rogochiy (yellow card) 84'; Kubík (yellow card) 86'; Zhavnerchik (yellow card) 90+5'	Summary	Caicedo (yellow card) 29' (goal) 36'; Ivanov (yellow card) 35'; Maicon (yellow card) 64'; Tarasov (yellow card) 68'; Sychev (yellow card) 90'	Stadium: Kuban Stadium; Attendance: 27,620; Referee: Stanislav Sukhina

12 September 2011 23	Terek Grozny	1–2	Kuban Krasnodar	Grozny
18:30 MSK (UTC+4)	Yatchenko (yellow card) 22'; Ferreira (yellow card) 27'; Asildarov 32'; Pavlenko (yellow card) 68'; Georgiev (yellow card) 75'	Summary	Tlisov (yellow card) 25'; Traoré 28' (pen.), 53'; Lolo (yellow card) 72'; Kozlov (yellow card) 81'	Stadium: Akhmat-Arena; Attendance: 14,000; Referee: Sergey Lapochkin

18 September 2011 24	Kuban Krasnodar	1–0	Anzhi Makhachkala	Krasnodar
20:45 MSK (UTC+4)	Bucur 14'; Lolo (yellow card) 52'	Summary	João Carlos (yellow card) 30'	Stadium: Kuban Stadium; Attendance: 31,527; Referee: Aleksey Eskov

25 September 2011 25	Spartak Nalchik	0–1	Kuban Krasnodar	Nalchik
14:00 MSK (UTC+4)	Rukhaia (yellow card) 32'; Ovsiyenko (yellow card) 66'	Summary	Traoré 30'; Zhavnerchik (yellow card) 87'	Stadium: Spartak Stadium; Attendance: 5,000; Referee: Timur Arslanbekov

2 October 2011 26	Kuban Krasnodar	0–0	CSKA Moscow	Krasnodar
17:00 MSK (UTC+4)	Varga (yellow card) 46'; Traoré (yellow card) 68'; Armaș (yellow card) 90+2'	Summary	Aldonin (yellow card) 44'; Nababkin (yellow card) 70'; Šemberas (yellow card) 77'; Berezutski (yellow card) 77'	Stadium: Kuban Stadium; Attendance: 27,892; Referee: Stanislav Sukhina

16 October 2011 27	Amkar Perm	3–1	Kuban Krasnodar	Perm
12:30 MSK (UTC+4)	Mijailović 3' (yellow card) 39'; Knežević (yellow card) 5' (yellow-red card) 84' (goal) 58'; Novaković (yellow card) 56'; Burmistrov 75'	Summary	Né (yellow card) 56'; Bucur (yellow card) 74' (goal) 90+4'	Stadium: Zvezda Stadium; Attendance: 7,200; Referee: Alexey Nikolaev

22 October 2011 28	Kuban Krasnodar	1–1	Krylia Sovetov	Krasnodar
18:30 MSK (UTC+4)	Davydov 49'; Né (yellow card) 90+4'	Summary	Kornilenko 41'; Ponomarenko (yellow card) 66'; Đorđević (yellow card) 90+1' (yellow-red card) 90+4'	Stadium: Kuban Stadium; Attendance: 10,470; Referee: Almir Kayumov

29 October 2011 29	Krasnodar	0–2	Kuban Krasnodar	Krasnodar
18:15 MSK (UTC+4)	Mikheyev (yellow card) 43'; Abreu (yellow card) 90+3'	Summary	Lolo (yellow card) 9'; Traoré 41', 86'; Ureña (yellow card) 42'; Varga (yellow card) 45+1'; Bugayev (yellow card) 61'; Komkov (yellow card) 85'	Stadium: Kuban Stadium; Attendance: 23,000; Referee: Sergey Karasev

6 November 2011 30	Kuban Krasnodar	1–1	Zenit St.Petersburg	Krasnodar
16:15 MSK (UTC+4)	Lolo (yellow card) 2'; Bucur (yellow card) 8'; Traoré (yellow card) 46' (goal) 66' (pen.)	Summary	Denisov 28'; Luković (yellow card) 30'; Bruno Alves (yellow card) 49'; Hubočan (yellow card) 65'	Stadium: Kuban Stadium; Attendance: 28,650; Referee: Igor Egorov

===== League table =====
Pos	Team	Pld	W	D	L	GF	GA	GD	Pts	Qualification
4	Spartak Moscow	30	15	8	7	48	33	+15	53 (Note: Spartak Moscow ahead of Lokomotiv Moscow on head-to-head points; Lokomotiv Moscow–Spartak Moscow 0–2, Spartak Moscow–Lokomotiv Moscow 3–0.)	Qualification to Championship group
5	Lokomotiv Moscow	30	15	8	7	49	30	+19	53	Qualification to Championship group
6	Kuban Krasnodar	30	14	7	9	38	27	+11	49	Qualification to Championship group
7	Rubin Kazan	30	13	10	7	40	27	+13	49	Qualification to Championship group
8	Anzhi Makhachkala	30	13	9	8	38	32	+6	48	Qualification to Championship group

Source: Russian Premier League
Rules for classification: 1) points; 2) number of wins; 3) head-to-head points; 4) number of head-to-head wins; 5) head-to-head goal difference; 6) number of head-to-head goals scored; 7) number of head-to-head away goals scored; 8) goal difference; 9) number of goals scored; 10) number of away goals scored.

==== Championship group ====
===== Matches =====
20 November 2011 31	Dynamo Moscow	2–1	Kuban Krasnodar	Moscow
14:00 MSK (UTC+4)	Semshov 19' (yellow card) 38'; Kokorin 27'; Wilkshire (yellow card) 42'	Summary	Kulik (yellow card) 27'; Bugayev 59'; Varga (yellow card) 68'	Stadium: Arena Khimki; Attendance: 6,144; Referee: Mikhail Vilkov

24 November 2012 32	Kuban Krasnodar	1–1	Spartak Moscow	Krasnodar
13:00 MSK (UTC+4)	Traoré (yellow card) 22' (goal) 37'; Tlisov (yellow card) 26'; Zelão (yellow card) 88'	Summary	Pareja (yellow card) 22'; Rodri (yellow card) 33'; Bryzgalov (yellow card) 78'; Welliton (yellow card) 85'; Makeev 86'; Rafael Carioca (yellow card) 89'	Stadium: Kuban Stadium; Attendance: 16,360; Referee: Aleksandr Egorov

3 March 2012 33	Lokomotiv Moscow	2–0	Kuban Krasnodar	Moscow
18:30 MSK (UTC+4)	Maicon 5'; Torbinski (yellow card) 42'; Caicedo 44'; Ibričić (yellow card) 85'	Summary	Ureña (yellow card) 43'; Bucur (yellow card) 68'	Stadium: Lokomotiv Stadium; Attendance: 9,016; Referee: Vladislav Bezborodov

11 March 2012 34	Zenit St.Petersburg	1–1	Kuban Krasnodar	Saint Petersburg
13:00 MSK (UTC+4)	Bruno Alves (yellow card) 38'; Denisov (yellow card) 52'; Lazović (yellow card) 52' (goal) 74'	Summary	Ionov 39' (pen.)	Stadium: Petrovsky Stadium; Attendance: 19,100; Referee: Sergey Karasev

18 March 2012 35	Kuban Krasnodar	1–0	Rubin Kazan	Krasnodar
14:15 MSK (UTC+4)	Lolo (yellow card) 10'; Pizzelli 43'; Bucur (yellow card) 76'; Armaș (yellow card) 77'; Zelão (yellow card) 86'	Summary	Navas (yellow card) 13'; Bocchetti (yellow card) 37'; Kasaev (yellow card) 86'	Stadium: Kuban Stadium; Attendance: 18,233; Referee: Sergey Lapochkin

25 March 2012 36	Anzhi Makhachkala	2–0	Kuban Krasnodar	Makhachkala
19:30 MSK (UTC+4)	Ahmedov 60'; Mukhammad (yellow card) 70'; Boussoufa 80'	Summary	Fidler (yellow card) 44'; Tsorayev (yellow card) 56'; Traoré (yellow card) 61'; Rogochiy (yellow card) 73'; Lolo (yellow card) 81'; Sosnin (yellow card) 88'; Pizzelli (yellow card) 90'	Stadium: Dynamo Stadium; Attendance: 14,000; Referee: Eduard Malyi

31 March 2012 37	Kuban Krasnodar	1–1	CSKA Moscow	Krasnodar
16:15 MSK (UTC+4)	Lolo (yellow card) 45+1'; Kulik (yellow card) 75'; Sekret 88'	Summary	Wernbloom (yellow card) 45+2'; Tošić (yellow card) 59' Doumbia 71'	Stadium: Kuban Stadium; Attendance: 26,423; Referee: Igor Egorov

8 April 2012 38	Spartak Moscow	2–0	Kuban Krasnodar	Moscow
18:45 MSK (UTC+4)	Emenike 7'; Ari 60'; Makeyev (yellow card) 81'	Summary	Tlisov (yellow card) 65'	Stadium: Luzhniki Stadium; Attendance: 12,817; Referee: Aleksey Eskov

14 April 2012 39	Kuban	1–1	Lokomotiv	Krasnodar
13:15 MSK (UTC+4)	Zelão (yellow card) 44'; Lolo (yellow card) 65'; Pizzelli 74'; Bucur (yellow card) 90'	Summary	Pavlyuchenko (yellow card) 44' (goal) 62'	Stadium: Kuban Stadium; Attendance: 18,553; Referee: Stanislav Sukhina

21 April 2012 40	Kuban Krasnodar	1–1	Zenit St.Petersburg	Krasnodar
18:15 MSK (UTC+4)	Tsorayev (yellow card) 15'; Traoré (yellow card) 42' (goal) 61', 73'	Summary	Shirokov (yellow card) 42' (goal) 80'; Arshavin 79' (yellow card) 84'; Bukharov (yellow card) 83'	Stadium: Kuban Stadium; Attendance: 29,743; Referee: Vladimir Kazmenko

28 April 2012 41	Rubin Kazan	1–1	Kuban Krasnodar	Kazan
18:00 MSK (UTC+4)	Natcho 83' (pen.)	Summary	Bucur (yellow card) 25'; Lolo (yellow card) 57'; Pizzelli 69'; Kulik (yellow card) 73'; Tsorayev (yellow card) 74'	Stadium: Central Stadium; Attendance: 12,556; Referee: Maxim Layushkin

2 May 2012 42	Kuban Krasnodar	2–2	Anzhi Makhachkala	Krasnodar
20:45 MSK (UTC+4)	Tsorayev 39'; Zelão (yellow card) 53'; Traoré (yellow card) 59'; Armaș 62'	Summary	Boussoufa 14' (yellow card) 65'; Eto'o 22' (yellow card) 53'; João Carlos (yellow card) 61'; Carcela (yellow card) 82'	Stadium: Kuban Stadium; Attendance: 25,560; Referee: Aleksei Nikolaev

8 May 2012 43	CSKA Moscow	0–0	Kuban Krasnodar	Moscow
17:00 MSK (UTC+4)	Vasin (yellow card) 61'	Summary	Zhavnerchik (yellow card) 25'; Fidler (yellow card) 34'	Stadium: Luzhniki Stadium; Attendance: 9,869; Referee: Aleksey Eskov

13 May 2012 44	Kuban Krasnodar	1–1	Dynamo Moscow	Krasnodar
18:30 MSK (UTC+4)	Traoré (yellow card) 4' (goal) 10'; Lolo (yellow card) 64'	Summary	Fernández (yellow card) 45'; Yusupov (yellow card) 63'; Misimović 90+1'	Stadium: Kuban Stadium; Attendance: 24,400; Referee: Vitali Meshkov

===== League table =====
Pos	Team	Pld	W	D	L	GF	GA	GD	Pts	Qualification
1	Zenit St. Petersburg (C)	44	24	16	4	85	40	+45	88	Qualification to Champions League group stage
2	Spartak Moscow	44	21	12	11	69	47	+22	75	Qualification to Champions League play-off round
3	CSKA Moscow	44	19	16	9	72	47	+25	73	Qualification to Europa League play-off round
4	Dynamo Moscow	44	20	12	12	66	50	+16	72	Qualification to Europa League third qualifying round
5	Anzhi Makhachkala	44	19	13	12	54	42	+12	70	Qualification to Europa League second qualifying round
6	Rubin Kazan	44	17	17	10	55	41	+14	68	Qualification to Europa League group stage (Note: Rubin have won the 2011–12 Russian Cup and thus have qualified for the group stage of the 2012–13 UEFA Europa League.)
7	Lokomotiv Moscow	44	18	12	14	59	48	+11	66	
8	Kuban Krasnodar	44	15	16	13	50	45	+5	61	

Source: Russian Premier League
Rules for classification: 1) points; 2) number of wins; 3) head-to-head points; 4) number of head-to-head wins; 5) head-to-head goal difference; 6) number of head-to-head goals scored; 7) number of head-to-head away goals scored; 8) goal difference; 9) number of goals scored; 10) number of away goals scored
(C) Champions

=== Russian Cup ===
==== 2011–12 ====
17 July 2011 Round of 32	Dynamo Bryansk	3–1	Kuban Krasnodar	Bryansk
19:00 MSK (UTC+4)	Romaschenko (yellow card) 45'; Dimidko (yellow card) 85'; Sorokin 90+3' (pen.); Junuzović (yellow card) 93' (goal) 94'; Temnikov (yellow card) 95' (goal) 96'; Kalimullin (yellow card) 104'	Summary	Maksimov (yellow card) 62'; Davydov 83'	Stadium: Dynamo Stadium; Attendance: 7,932; Referee: Maksim Layushkin

== Squad statistics ==
=== Appearances and goals ===
No.	Pos	Nat	Player	Total		Premier League		Russian Cup	
No.	Pos	Nat	Player	Apps	Goals	Apps	Goals	Apps	Goals
2	DF	(Moldova) MDA	Igor Armaș	40	1	39	1	1	0
6	MF	(Russia) RUS	David Tsorayev	24	1	20+4	1	0	0
7	MF	(Russia) RUS	Vladislav Kulik	31	2	31	2	0	0
8	MF	(Russia) RUS	Artur Tlisov	39	0	37+1	0	1	0
11	FW	(Romania) ROU	Gheorghe Bucur	40	6	23+16	6	1	0
14	MF	(Russia) RUS	Aleksei Ionov	7	1	7	1	0	0
15	DF	(Belarus) BLR	Maksim Zhavnerchik	36	0	34+1	0	1	0
17	MF	(Russia) RUS	Artyom Fidler	26	0	13+13	0	0	0
18	DF	(Russia) RUS	Anton Rogochiy	16	0	14+2	0	0	0
20	FW	(Ivory Coast) CIV	Lacina Traoré	40	17	36+3	17	1	0
21	FW	(Costa Rica) CRC	Marco Ureña	21	0	8+12	0	1	0
22	MF	(Russia) RUS	Anton Sosnin	4	0	2+2	0	0	0
23	GK	(Russia) RUS	Aleksandr Belenov	24	0	24	0	0	0
25	DF	(Russia) RUS	Aleksei Kozlov	41	0	38+2	0	1	0
26	DF	(Brazil) BRA	Zelão	29	3	27+1	3	1	0
27	DF	(Ivory Coast) CIV	Igor Lolo	18	0	18	0	0	0
30	FW	(Armenia) ARM	Marcos Pizzelli	10	4	8+2	4	0	0
37	MF	(Russia) RUS	Mikhail Komkov	14	2	3+11	2	0	0
43	DF	(Russia) RUS	Roman Bugayev	27	1	10+16	1	0+1	0
90	FW	(Russia) RUS	Anton Sekret	2	1	0+2	1	0	0
Players away from Kuban Krasnodar on loan:
5	DF	(Russia) RUS	Sergei Bendz	2	0	2	0	0	0
32	DF	(Angola) ANG	Francisco Zuela	1	0	1	0	0	0
Players who left Kuban Krasnodar during the season:
10	FW	(Russia) RUS	Sergei Davydov	26	10	7+18	9	0+1	1
19	MF	(Belarus) BLR	Aleksey Skvernyuk	5	0	1+3	0	1	0
22	MF	(Russia) RUS	Igor Paderin	3	0	0+3	0	0	0
28	FW	(Slovakia) SVK	František Kubík	5	0	2+3	0	0	0
30	MF	(Ivory Coast) CIV	Marco Né	29	1	20+8	1	0+1	0
40	MF	(Romania) ROU	Dacian Varga	28	1	25+2	1	0+1	0
87	MF	(Russia) RUS	Ilya Maksimov	15	0	14	0	1	0
98	GK	(Russia) RUS	Aleksandr Budakov	21	0	20	0	1	0
99	FW	(Russia) RUS	Rustem Kalimullin	1	0	0+1	0	0	0
99	MF	(Russia) RUS	Vladislav Ryzhkov	1	0	0+1	0	0	0

=== Goal scorers ===
Place	Position	Nation	Number	Name	Russian Premier League	Russian Cup	Total
1	FW	(Ivory Coast)	20	Lacina Traoré	17	0	17
2	FW	(Russia)	10	Sergei Davydov	9	1	10
3	FW	(Romania)	11	Gheorghe Bucur	6	0	6
4	FW	(Armenia)	30	Marcos Pizzelli	4	0	4
5	DF	(Brazil)	26	Zelão	3	0	3
6	MF	(Russia)	37	Mikhail Komkov	2	0	2
6	MF	(Russia)	7	Vladislav Kulik	2	0	2
8	DF	(Russia)	43	Roman Bugayev	1	0	1
8	MF	(Russia)	14	Aleksei Ionov	1	0	1
8	FW	(Russia)	90	Anton Sekret	1	0	1
8	MF	(Russia)	6	David Tsorayev	1	0	1
8	DF	(Moldova)	2	Igor Armaș	1	0	1
8	MF	(Ivory Coast)	30	Marco Né	1	0	1
8	MF	(Romania)	40	Dacian Varga	1	0	1
				TOTALS	50	1	51

=== Disciplinary record ===
Number	Nation	Position	Name	Russian Premier League		Russian Cup		Total	
Number	Nation	Position	Name	Yellow card	Red card	Yellow card	Red card	Yellow card	Red card
2	(Moldova)	DF	Igor Armaș	6	1	0	0	1	0
5	(Russia)	DF	Sergei Bendz	1	0	0	0	1	0
6	(Russia)	MF	David Tsorayev	7	0	0	0	3	0
7	(Russia)	MF	Vladislav Kulik	4	0	0	0	3	0
8	(Russia)	MF	Artur Tlisov	5	0	0	0	2	0
10	(Russia)	FW	Sergei Davydov	2	0	0	0	1	0
11	(Romania)	FW	Gheorghe Bucur	10	0	0	0	4	0
15	(Belarus)	DF	Maksim Zhavnerchik	6	0	0	0	1	0
17	(Russia)	MF	Artyom Fidler	3	0	0	0	2	0
18	(Russia)	DF	Anton Rogochiy	3	0	0	0	1	0
19	(Belarus)	MF	Aleksey Skvernyuk	1	0	0	0	1	0
20	(Ivory Coast)	FW	Lacina Traoré	10	0	0	0	5	0
21	(Costa Rica)	FW	Marco Ureña	2	0	0	0	1	0
22	(Russia)	MF	Igor Paderin	1	0	0	0	1	0
22	(Russia)	MF	Anton Sosnin	1	0	0	0	1	0
25	(Russia)	DF	Aleksei Kozlov	6	1	0	0	2	1
26	(Brazil)	DF	Zelão	10	1	0	0	4	0
27	(Ivory Coast)	DF	Igor Lolo	10	0	0	0	6	0
28	(Slovakia)	FW	František Kubík	2	0	0	0	1	0
30	(Ivory Coast)	MF	Marco Né	3	0	0	0	1	0
30	(Armenia)	FW	Marcos Pizzelli	1	0	0	0	1	0
37	(Russia)	MF	Mikhail Komkov	2	0	0	0	1	0
40	(Romania)	MF	Dacian Varga	8	0	0	0	1	0
43	(Russia)	DF	Roman Bugayev	4	0	0	0	1	0
87	(Russia)	MF	Ilya Maksimov	1	0	1	0	1	0
98	(Russia)	GK	Aleksandr Budakov	2	0	0	0	1	0
			TOTALS	111	3	1	0	112	3
