= 2012–13 FC Kuban Krasnodar season =

Kuban Krasnodar
2012–13 season
- Chairman: Aleksandr Tkachyov
- Manager: Dan Petrescu until 14 August 2012; Yuri Krasnozhan; 16 August 2012 – 9 January 2013; Leonid Kuchuk from 9 January 2013
- Stadium: Kuban Stadium
- Russian Premier League: 5th
- Russian Cup: Quarter-finals Zenit St. Petersburg
- Top goalscorer: League: Aras Özbiliz (9); All: Aras Özbiliz (10)
- Highest home attendance: 29,870 vs Spartak Moscow; 15 September 2012
- Lowest home attendance: 10,730 vs Alania Vladikavkaz; 8 December 2012
- Average home league attendance: 18,216; 12 December 2012
Home colours	Away colours

The 2012–13 FC Kuban Krasnodar season was the second successive season that the club played in the Russian Premier League, the highest tier of football in Russia. They also participated in the 2012–13 Russian Cup, being knocked out at the quarter-final stage by Zenit St. Petersburg on penalties after a 0–0 draw.

They started the season with Dan Petrescu as manager; however, he resigned on 14 August 2012 to take over as Dynamo Moscow manager. He was replaced by Yuri Krasnozhan, who himself was fired on 9 January 2013, after five months in charge due to irreconcilable differences with the owners. He was replaced by Leonid Kuchuk, who left Arsenal Kyiv to take over.

== Squad ==
As of 16 February 2013, according to the Russian Premier League official website. Note: Flags indicate national team as defined under FIFA eligibility rules; some limited exceptions apply. Players may hold more than one non-FIFA nationality.

No.	Pos.	Nation	Player
2	DF	MDA	Igor Armaș
3	DF	NGR	Dele Adeleye
4	DF	BRA	Xandão
5	DF	ESP	Ángel Dealbert
6	MF	RUS	David Tsorayev
7	MF	RUS	Vladislav Kulik
8	MF	RUS	Artur Tlisov
10	MF	RUS	Aleksei Ionov (C)
11	FW	ROU	Gheorghe Bucur
14	FW	NGR	Abdulwaheed Afolabi
15	DF	BUL	Maksim Zhavnerchik
17	MF	RUS	Artyom Fidler
20	FW	ROU	Daniel Niculae
21	FW	CRC	Marco Ureña

No.	Pos.	Nation	Player
22	MF	RUS	Anton Sosnin
23	GK	RUS	Aleksandr Belenov
24	FW	ARM	Aras Özbiliz
25	DF	RUS	Aleksei Kozlov
27	DF	CIV	Igor Lolo
28	FW	SEN	Ibrahima Baldé
30	FW	ARM	Marcos Pizzelli
31	MF	BRA	Leandro (on loan from Arsenal Kyiv)
32	MF	KAZ	Baurzhan Islamkhan
33	GK	RUS	Bogdan Karyukin
34	MF	BFA	Charles Kaboré
43	DF	RUS	Roman Bugayev
71	MF	BUL	Ivelin Popov

== Transfers ==
=== Summer ===
In: Note: Flags indicate national team as defined under FIFA eligibility rules; some limited exceptions apply. Players may hold more than one non-FIFA nationality.

No.	Pos.	Nation	Player
5	DF	ESP	Ángel Dealbert (from (Spain) Valencia)
14	FW	NGR	Abdulwaheed Afolabi (from (Ukraine) Tavriya Simferopol)
20	FW	ROU	Daniel Niculae (from (France) AS Monaco, previously on loan to (France) Nancy)
24	MF	ARM	Aras Özbiliz (from (Netherlands) Ajax)
28	FW	SEN	Ibrahima Baldé (from (Spain) Osasuna)
71	MF	BUL	Ivelin Popov (from (Turkey) Gaziantepspor)

Out: Note: Flags indicate national team as defined under FIFA eligibility rules; some limited exceptions apply. Players may hold more than one non-FIFA nationality.

No.	Pos.	Nation	Player
4	DF	RUS	Boris Rotenberg (to (Cyprus) Olympiakos Nicosia on loan from (Russia) Dynamo Moscow)
5	DF	RUS	Sergei Bendz (on loan to (Russia) Tom Tomsk, previously on loan to (Russia) Volga Nizhny Novgorod)
19	FW	RUS	Anton Sekret (on loan to (Russia) Volgar Astrakhan)
20	FW	CIV	Lacina Traoré (to (Russia) Anzhi Makhachkala)
32	DF	ANG	Francisco Zuela (to (Cyprus) APOEL, previously on loan to (Greece) Atromitos)
37	MF	RUS	Mikhail Komkov (on loan to (Russia) Khimki)

=== Winter ===
In: Note: Flags indicate national team as defined under FIFA eligibility rules; some limited exceptions apply. Players may hold more than one non-FIFA nationality.

No.	Pos.	Nation	Player
3	DF	NGR	Dele Adeleye (from (Ukraine) Tavriya)
4	DF	BRA	Xandão (from (Brazil) Desportivo Brasil)
31	MF	BRA	Leandro (on loan from (Ukraine) FC Arsenal Kyiv)
32	MF	KAZ	Bauyrzhan Islamkhan (from (Kazakhstan) FK Taraz)
34	MF	BFA	Charles Kaboré (from (France) Marseille)

Out: Note: Flags indicate national team as defined under FIFA eligibility rules; some limited exceptions apply. Players may hold more than one non-FIFA nationality.

No.	Pos.	Nation	Player
1	GK	MDA	Stanislav Namașco (to (Russia) FC Volgar Astrakhan)
9	FW	RUS	Nikolai Zhilyayev (released)
18	DF	RUS	Anton Rogochiy (released)
26	DF	BRA	Zelão (to (Kazakhstan) Astana)
90	FW	RUS	Aleksandr Prudnikov (to (Russia) Alania Vladikavkaz)

== Competitions ==
=== Russian Premier League ===
==== Results by round ====
Round	1	2	3	4	5	6	7	8	9	10	11	12	13	14	15	16	17	18	19	20	21	22	23	24	25	26	27	28	29	30
Ground	A	H	A	H	A	H	A	H	A	H	A	A	H	A	H	A	H	A	H	A	H	A	H	A	H	H	A	H	A	H
Result	L	W	L	W	L	W	W	D	L	W	W	L	W	W	L	W	W	L	D	W	D	D	D	D	D	D	W	W	D	W
Position							7	6	8	7	7	6	5	5	7	6	6	6	4	4	5	6	6	7	7	7	7	5	5	5

Updated to match(es) played on 28 May 2013. Source: Russian Premier League
A = Away; H = Home; W = Win; D = Draw; L = Loss

==== Matches ====
21 July 2012 1	Anzhi Makhachkala	2 – 1	Kuban Krasnodar	Makhachkala, Dagestan
20:00 MSK (UTC+4)	Eto'o 31'; Traore 43'	Summary	João Carlos 1' (o.g.)	Stadium: Dynamo Stadium; Attendance: 13,500; Referee: Maxim Layushkin

27 July 2012 2	Kuban Krasnodar	1 – 0	Mordovia Saransk	Krasnodar, Krasnodar Krai
20:00 MSK (UTC+4)	Bucur 85'	Summary		Stadium: Kuban Stadium; Attendance: 16,820; Referee: Alexey Nikolaev

5 August 2012 3	Krylia Sovetov	2 – 1	Kuban Krasnodar	Samara
17:00 MSK (UTC+4)	Karnilenka 30'; Joseph-Reinette 86'	Summary	Tsorayev 39'; Tlisov (red card) 41'	Stadium: Metallurg Stadion; Attendance: 11,000; Referee: Vladimir Kazmenko

10 August 2012 4	Kuban Krasnodar	2 – 1	Krasnodar	Krasnodar, Krasnodar Krai
20:00 MSK (UTC+4)	Amisulashvili 38' (o.g.); Ionov 81'	Summary	Movsisyan 86'	Stadium: Kuban Stadium; Attendance: 23,547; Referee: Evgeny Turbin

20 August 2012 5	Alania	2 – 1	Kuban Krasnodar	Vladikavkaz
20:00 MSK (UTC+4)	Neco 37' (pen.), 61'	Summary	Lolo (yellow card) 26' (yellow-red card) 35'; Dealbert 39'	Stadium: Republican Spartak Stadium; Attendance: 12,000; Referee: Eduard Malyi

27 August 2012 6	Kuban Krasnodar	6 – 2	Volga	Krasnodar, Krasnodar Krai
19:30 MSK (UTC+4)	Tsorayev 1'; Pizzelli 13', 47'; Baldé 44', 69'; Niculae 76'	Summary	Asildarov 53' (pen.); Sapogov 78'	Stadium: Kuban Stadium; Attendance: 11,700; Referee: Maxim Layushkin

1 September 2012 7	Dynamo Moscow	1 – 2	Kuban Krasnodar	Moscow
16:00 MSK (UTC+4)	Noboa 45+2'	Summary	Fidler 65'; Özbiliz 90+3'	Stadium: Arena Khimki; Attendance: 11,058; Referee: Sergey Karasev

15 September 2012 8	Kuban Krasnodar	2 – 2	Spartak Moscow	Krasnodar, Krasnodar Krai
17:00 MSK (UTC+4)	Fidler 27'; Özbiliz 63'	Summary	McGeady 13'; Emenike 53'	Stadium: Kuban Stadium; Attendance: 29,870; Referee: Mikhail Vilkov

23 September 2012 9	Rubin	1 – 0	Kuban Krasnodar	Kazan, Tatarstan
19:00 MSK (UTC+4)	Töre (red card) 38'; Bocchetti 45+1'	Summary	Dealbert (red card) 34'	Stadium: Central Stadium; Attendance: 7,850; Referee: Aleksey Eskov

29 September 2012 10	Kuban Krasnodar	2 – 1	Terek Grozny	Krasnodar
19:00 MSK (UTC+4)	Ionov 32'; Özbiliz 83'	Summary	Jiránek 36'	Stadium: Kuban Stadium; Attendance: 16,700; Referee: Timur Arslanbekov

6 October 2012 11	Lokomotiv Moscow	0 – 1	Kuban Krasnodar	Moscow
14:00 MSK (UTC+4)		Summary	Bucur 71'; Fidler (yellow card) 21' (yellow-red card) 89'	Stadium: Lokomotiv Stadium; Attendance: 10,830; Referee: Vladimir Kazmenko

20 October 2012 12	Zenit	1 – 0	Kuban Krasnodar	Saint Petersburg
16:00 MSK (UTC+4)	Kerzhakov 45+1' (pen.)	Summary		Stadium: Petrovsky Stadium; Attendance: 20,000; Referee: Sergey Karasev

26 October 2012 13	Kuban Krasnodar	1 – 0	Rostov	Krasnodar, Krasnodar Krai
20:30 MSK (UTC+4)	Popov 78'	Summary		Stadium: Kuban Stadium; Attendance: 14,890; Referee: Igor Nizovtsev

3 November 2012 14	Amkar Perm	0 – 3	Kuban Krasnodar	Perm
13:00 MSK (UTC+4)	Volkov (red card) 90+3'	Summary	Baldé 59'; Özbiliz 72' (pen.); Pizzelli 87'	Stadium: Zvezda Stadium; Attendance: 5,800; Referee: Vasiliy Kazartsev

10 November 2012 15	Kuban Krasnodar	1 – 3	CSKA	Krasnodar, Krasnodar Krai
18:30 MSK (UTC+4)	Özbiliz 45' (pen.); Zelão (yellow card) 68' (yellow-red card) 90'	Summary	Musa 35', 51'; Elm 57'	Stadium: Kuban Stadium; Attendance: 24,680; Referee: Sergey Lapochkin

18 November 2012 16	Mordovia Saransk	0 – 3	Kuban Krasnodar	Saransk
16:00 MSK (UTC+4)		Summary	Stepanets 18' (o.g.); Baldé 28'; Özbiliz 49'	Stadium: Start Stadium; Attendance: 4,000; Referee: Vladislav Bezborodov

25 November 2012 17	Kuban Krasnodar	4 – 1	Krylia Sovetov	Krasnodar, Krasnodar Krai
16:00 MSK (UTC+4)	Baldé 18'; Popov 19', 79'; Pizzelli 71' (pen.)	Summary	Özbiliz 64' (o.g.)	Stadium: Kuban Stadium; Attendance: 14,560; Referee: Igor Nizovtsev

30 November 2012 18	Krasnodar	2 – 1	Kuban Krasnodar	Krasnodar, Krasnodar Krai
18:15 MSK (UTC+4)	Shipitsin 85'; Joãozinho 90+4'	Summary	Özbiliz 55'	Stadium: Kuban Stadium; Attendance: 19,500; Referee: Alexey Nikolaev

8 December 2012 19	Kuban Krasnodar	0 – 0	Alania	Krasnodar, Krasnodar Krai
14:30 MSK (UTC+4)	Zelão (yellow card) 13' (yellow-red card) 42'; Kozlov (yellow card) 59' (yellow-red card) 80'	Summary	Dudiyev (red card) 88'	Stadium: Kuban Stadium; Attendance: 10,730; Referee: Timur Arslanbekov

8 March 2013 20	Volga	0 – 2	Kuban Krasnodar	Nizhny Novgorod
13:30 MSK (UTC+4)		Summary	Özbiliz 20'; Tlisov 90+1'	Stadium: Lokomotiv Stadium; Attendance: 7,400; Referee: Aleksey Eskov

16 March 2013 21	Kuban Krasnodar	1 – 1	Dynamo Moscow	Krasnodar, Krasnodar Krai
18:30 MSK (UTC+4)	Baldé 28'	Summary	Kokorin 24'	Stadium: Kuban Stadium; Attendance: 21,500; Referee: Aleksandr Egorov

31 March 2013 22	Spartak Moscow	2 – 2	Kuban Krasnodar	Moscow
20:15 MSK (UTC+4)	Kaboré 23' (o.g.); Jurado 82'	Summary	Özbiliz 56'; Bucur 63'	Stadium: Luzhniki Stadium; Attendance: 13651; Referee: Maxim Layushkin

7 April 2013 23	Kuban Krasnodar	0 – 0	Rubin	Krasnodar, Krasnodar Krai
18:30 MSK (UTC+4)		Summary		Stadium: Kuban Stadium; Attendance: 26,494; Referee: Sergey Karasev

13 April 2013 24	Terek Grozny	2 – 2	Kuban Krasnodar	Grozny, Chechnya
16:00 MSK (UTC+4)	Utsiyev 59'; N'Douassel 71' (pen.)	Summary	Bucur 68'; Dealbert (yellow card) 54' (yellow-red card) 70'; Popov 88'	Stadium: Sultan Bilimkhanov Stadium; Attendance: 18,250; Referee: Timur Arslanbekov

20 April 2013 25	Kuban Krasnodar	0 – 0	Lokomotiv Moscow	Krasnodar, Krasnodar Krai
18:30 MSK (UTC+4)		Summary		Stadium: Kuban Stadium; Attendance: 23,700; Referee: Vladislav Bezborodov

28 April 2013 26	Kuban Krasnodar	2 – 2	Zenit	Krasnodar, Krasnodar Krai
16:00 MSK (UTC+4)	Niculae 24'; Popov 30'	Summary	Zyryanov 6'; Danny 66'	Stadium: Kuban Stadium; Attendance: 30,359; Referee: Aleksandr Egorov

4 May 2013 27	Rostov	0 – 2	Kuban Krasnodar	Rostov-on-Don, Rostov Oblast
15:45 MSK (UTC+4)		Summary	Popov 48', 56'	Stadium: Olimp – 2 Attendance: 7,200; Referee: Sergey Lapochkin

11 May 2013 28	Kuban Krasnodar	4 – 0	Amkar Perm	Krasnodar, Krasnodar Krai
19:30 MSK (UTC+4)	Baldé 8', 42'; Popov 44'; Pizzelli 76' (pen.)	Summary		Stadium: Kuban Stadium; Attendance: 16,724; Referee: Vladislav Bezborodov

18 May 2013 29	CSKA	0 – 0	Kuban Krasnodar	Moscow
13:30 MSK (UTC+4)		Summary		Stadium: Luzhniki Stadium; Attendance: 17,500; Referee: Sergey Karasev

26 May 2013 30	Kuban Krasnodar	1 – 0	Anzhi Makhachkala	Krasnodar, Krasnodar Krai
13:30 MSK (UTC+4)	Popov 24'	Summary		Stadium: Kuban Stadium; Attendance: 31,743; Referee: Mikhail Vilkov

==== League table ====
Pos	Team	Pld	W	D	L	GF	GA	GD	Pts	Qualification or relegation
3	Anzhi Makhachkala	30	15	8	7	45	34	+11	53	Qualification for the Europa League group stage
4	Spartak Moscow	30	15	6	9	51	39	+12	51	Qualification to Europa League play-off round
5	Kuban Krasnodar	30	14	9	7	48	28	+20	51	Qualification for the Europa League third qualifying round
6	Rubin Kazan	30	15	5	10	39	27	+12	50	Qualification for the Europa League second qualifying round
7	Dynamo Moscow	30	14	6	10	41	34	+7	48 (Note: Dynamo Moscow ahead of Terek Grozny on head-to-head points; Dynamo Moscow–Terek Grozny 1–2, Terek Grozny–Dynamo Moscow 1–2.)	

Source: Russian Premier League
Rules for classification: 1) points; 2) number of wins; 3) head-to-head points; 4) number of head-to-head wins; 5) head-to-head goal difference; 6) number of head-to-head goals scored; 7) number of head-to-head away goals scored; 8) goal difference; 9) number of goals scored; 10) number of away goals scored; 11) position in the 2011–12 season (only used until all the regularly scheduled games have been played); 11) extra play-off game or tournament between the teams in question.

=== Russian Cup ===
==== Matches ====
26 September 2012 Round of 32	Volga Ulyanovsk	0 – 1	Kuban Krasnodar	Ulyanovsk
18:00 MSK (UTC+4)		Summary	Prudnikov 11'	Stadium: Trud Stadium; Attendance: 8,100

30 October 2012 Round of 16	Kuban Krasnodar	1 – 0	FC Krasnodar	Krasnodar, Krasnodar Krai
19:30 MSK (UTC+4)	Özbiliz 19'	Summary		Stadium: Kuban Stadium; Attendance: 18,660; Referee: Maxim Layushkin

17 April 2013 Quarter-finals	Zenit St. Petersburg	0 – 0 (a.e.t.) (4 – 3 p)	Kuban Krasnodar	Saint Petersburg
19:30 MSK (UTC+4)		Summary		Stadium: Petrovsky Stadium; Attendance: 19,000; Referee: Vladimir Kazmenko
	Penalties
	Kerzhakov (penalty scored); Luković (penalty scored); Faizulin (penalty missed); Denisov (penalty missed); Witsel (penalty scored); Semak (penalty scored)		(penalty scored) Bucur; (penalty scored) Popov; (penalty missed) Kaboré; (penalty missed) Dealbert; (penalty scored) Tsorayev; (penalty missed) Leandro

== Squad statistics ==
As of 28 May 2012

=== Appearances and goals ===
No.	Pos	Nat	Player	Total		Premier League		Russian Cup	
No.	Pos	Nat	Player	Apps	Goals	Apps	Goals	Apps	Goals
2	DF	(Moldova) MDA	Igor Armaş	18	0	14+2	0	2+0	0
4	DF	(Brazil) BRA	Xandão	10	0	10+0	0	0+0	0
5	DF	(Spain) ESP	Ángel Dealbert	31	1	28+0	1	3+0	0
6	MF	(Russia) RUS	David Tsorayev	16	2	8+7	2	1+0	0
7	MF	(Russia) RUS	Vladislav Kulik	27	0	25+1	0	0+1	0
8	MF	(Russia) RUS	Artur Tlisov	27	1	16+8	1	3+0	0
10	MF	(Russia) RUS	Aleksei Ionov	32	2	29+1	2	2+0	0
11	FW	(Romania) ROU	Gheorghe Bucur	23	4	5+16	4	1+1	0
14	FW	(Nigeria) NGR	Abdulwaheed Afolabi	2	0	1+1	0	0+0	0
15	DF	(Belarus) BLR	Maksim Zhavnerchik	11	0	4+6	0	1+0	0
17	MF	(Russia) RUS	Artyom Fidler	17	2	10+5	2	1+1	0
20	FW	(Romania) ROU	Daniel Niculae	13	2	6+5	2	2+0	0
21	FW	(Costa Rica) CRC	Marco Ureña	7	0	0+6	0	1+0	0
22	MF	(Russia) RUS	Anton Sosnin	4	0	1+1	0	2+0	0
23	GK	(Russia) RUS	Aleksandr Belenov	32	0	30+0	0	2+0	0
24	FW	(Armenia) ARM	Aras Özbiliz	24	10	16+6	9	1+1	1
25	DF	(Russia) RUS	Aleksei Kozlov	26	0	25+0	0	1+0	0
27	DF	(Ivory Coast) CIV	Igor Lolo	17	0	16+0	0	1+0	0
28	FW	(Senegal) SEN	Ibrahima Baldé	23	8	21+2	8	0+0	0
30	FW	(Armenia) ARM	Marcos Pizzelli	23	6	12+9	5	2+0	1
31	MF	(Brazil) BRA	Leandro	8	0	7+0	0	1+0	0
34	MF	(Burkina Faso) BFA	Charles Kaboré	12	0	11+0	0	0+1	0
43	DF	(Russia) RUS	Roman Bugayev	9	0	7+0	0	2+0	0
71	MF	(Bulgaria) BUL	Ivelin Popov	26	9	18+5	9	1+2	0
Players away from Kuban Krasnodar on loan:
19	FW	(Russia) RUS	Anton Sekret	1	0	1+0	0	0+0	0
37	MF	(Russia) RUS	Mikhail Komkov	1	0	0+1	0	0+0	0
Players who left Kuban Krasnodar during the season:
18	DF	(Russia) RUS	Anton Rogochiy	2	0	0+1	0	1+0	0
26	DF	(Brazil) BRA	Zelão	12	0	9+2	0	1+0	0
90	FW	(Russia) RUS	Aleksandr Prudnikov	4	1	0+2	0	1+1	1

=== Top scorers ===
Place	Position	Nation	Number	Name	Russian Premier League	Russian Cup	Total
1	FW	(Armenia)	24	Aras Özbiliz	9	1	10
2	MF	(Bulgaria)	71	Ivelin Popov	9	0	9
3	FW	(Senegal)	28	Ibrahima Baldé	8	0	8
4	FW	(Armenia)	30	Marcos Pizzelli	5	0	5
5	FW	(Romania)	11	Gheorghe Bucur	4	0	4
6				Own goal	3	0	3
7	MF	(Russia)	6	David Tsorayev	2	0	2
7	MF	(Russia)	17	Artyom Fidler	2	0	2
7	MF	(Russia)	10	Aleksei Ionov	2	0	2
7	FW	(Romania)	20	Daniel Niculae	2	0	2
11	DF	(Spain)	5	Ángel Dealbert	1	0	1
11	MF	(Russia)	8	Artur Tlisov	1	0	1
11	FW	(Russia)	90	Aleksandr Prudnikov	0	1	1
				TOTALS	47	2	49

=== Disciplinary record ===
Number	Nation	Position	Name	Russian Premier League		Russian Cup		Total	
Number	Nation	Position	Name	Yellow card	Red card	Yellow card	Red card	Yellow card	Red card
2	(Moldova)	DF	Igor Armaş	4	0	0	0	4	0
4	(Brazil)	DF	Xandão	1	0	0	0	1	0
5	(Spain)	DF	Ángel Dealbert	4	2	1	0	5	2
6	(Russia)	MF	David Tsorayev	4	0	0	0	4	0
8	(Russia)	MF	Artur Tlisov	1	1	0	0	1	1
10	(Russia)	MF	Aleksei Ionov	3	0	1	0	4	0
11	(Romania)	FW	Gheorghe Bucur	4	0	0	0	4	0
15	(Belarus)	DF	Maksim Zhavnerchik	2	0	0	0	2	0
17	(Russia)	MF	Artyom Fidler	3	1	0	0	3	1
19	(Russia)	FW	Anton Sekret	1	0	0	0	1	0
20	(Romania)	FW	Daniel Niculae	1	0	0	0	1	0
23	(Russia)	GK	Aleksandr Belenov	2	0	0	0	2	0
24	(Armenia)	FW	Aras Özbiliz	4	0	0	0	4	0
25	(Russia)	DF	Aleksei Kozlov	9	1	0	0	9	1
26	(Brazil)	DF	Zelão	8	2	0	0	8	2
27	(Ivory Coast)	DF	Igor Lolo	6	1	0	0	6	1
28	(Senegal)	FW	Ibrahima Baldé	5	0	0	0	5	0
30	(Armenia)	FW	Ivelin Popov	2	0	0	0	2	0
31	(Brazil)	MF	Leandro	1	0	0	0	1	0
34	(Burkina Faso)	MF	Charles Kaboré	1	0	0	0	1	0
43	(Russia)	DF	Roman Bugayev	1	0	0	0	1	0
71	(Bulgaria)	MF	Ivelin Popov	6	0	1	0	7	0
90	(Russia)	FW	Aleksandr Prudnikov	1	0	0	0	1	0
			TOTALS	74	8	3	0	77	8
