= Aleksandr Budakov =

Russian professional football goalkeeper

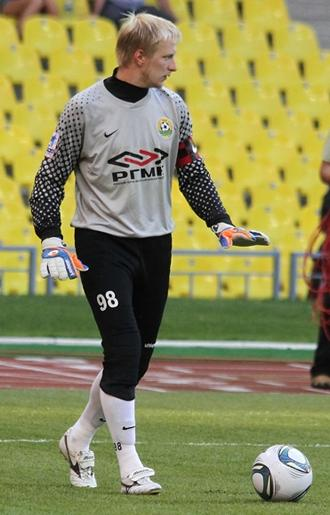

Personal information
- Full name: Aleksandr Vladimirovich Budakov
- Date of birth: 10 February 1985 (age 41)
- Place of birth: Magnitogorsk, Russian SFSR
- Height: 1.85 m (6 ft 1 in)
- Position: Goalkeeper

Youth career
- 2000–2002: Metallurg-Metiznik Magnitogorsk

Senior career*
| Years | Team | Apps | (Gls) |
| 2002–2006 | Lokomotiv Moscow | 0 | (0) |
| 2005 | → Vityaz Podolsk (loan) | 0 | (0) |
| 2006 | → Chernomorets Novorossiysk (loan) | 23 | (0) |
| 2007–2008 | Sibir Novosibirsk | 37 | (0) |
| 2009 | Krylia Sovetov Samara | 0 | (0) |
| 2010–2011 | Kuban Krasnodar | 56 | (1) |
| 2012 | Spartak Nalchik | 11 | (0) |
| 2012–2013 | Khimki | 12 | (0) |
| 2013–2015 | Torpedo Moscow | 2 | (0) |
| 2016 | Isloch Minsk Raion | 14 | (0) |
| 2016–2017 | Amkar Perm | 0 | (0) |
| 2017–2019 | Anzhi Makhachkala | 11 | (0) |

International career
| 2004 | Russia U19 | 4 | (0) |
| 2011 | Russia-2 | 1 | (0) |
- * Club domestic league appearances and goals

Aleksandr Vladimirovich Budakov (Russian: Александр Владимирович Будаков; born 10 February 1985) is a Russian former professional football goalkeeper.

== Club career ==
He made his professional debut in the Russian Second Division in 2006 for FC Chernomorets Novorossiysk.

== Match fixing ==
In August 2016, Budakov was one of several Isloch Minsk Raion players alleged to be involved in match fixing during their match with Dinamo Brest on 30 April 2016.

== Honours ==
- Russian First Division best goalkeeper: 2010.

== Career statistics ==
=== Club ===
As of 20 May 2018

| Club | Season | League | | | Cup | | Continental | | Other | | Total | |
| Club | Season | Division | Apps | Goals | Apps | Goals | Apps | Goals | Apps | Goals | Apps | Goals |
|---|---|---|---|---|---|---|---|---|---|---|---|---|
| Metallurg-Metiznik Magnitogorsk | 2000 | PFL | 0 | 0 | 0 | 0 | – | | – | | 0 | 0 |
| Lokomotiv Moscow | 2002 | Russian Premier League | 0 | 0 | 0 | 0 | 0 | 0 | – | | 0 | 0 |
| Lokomotiv Moscow | 2003 | Russian Premier League | 0 | 0 | 0 | 0 | 0 | 0 | – | | 0 | 0 |
| Lokomotiv Moscow | 2004 | Russian Premier League | 0 | 0 | 0 | 0 | 0 | 0 | – | | 0 | 0 |
| Lokomotiv Moscow | 2005 | Russian Premier League | 0 | 0 | – | | – | | – | | 0 | 0 |
| Lokomotiv Moscow | Total | | 0 | 0 | 0 | 0 | 0 | 0 | 0 | 0 | 0 | 0 |
| Vityaz Podolsk | 2005 | PFL | 0 | 0 | 1 | 0 | – | | – | | 1 | 0 |
| Chernomorets Novorossiysk | 2006 | PFL | 23 | 0 | 0 | 0 | – | | – | | 23 | 0 |
| Sibir Novosibirsk | 2007 | FNL | 22 | 0 | 2 | 0 | – | | – | | 24 | 0 |
| Sibir Novosibirsk | 2008 | FNL | 15 | 0 | 0 | 0 | – | | – | | 15 | 0 |
| Sibir Novosibirsk | Total | | 37 | 0 | 2 | 0 | 0 | 0 | 0 | 0 | 39 | 0 |
| Krylia Sovetov Samara | 2009 | Russian Premier League | 0 | 0 | 1 | 0 | 0 | 0 | – | | 1 | 0 |
| Kuban Krasnodar | 2010 | FNL | 36 | 1 | 0 | 0 | – | | – | | 36 | 1 |
| Kuban Krasnodar | 2011–12 | Russian Premier League | 20 | 0 | 1 | 0 | – | | – | | 21 | 0 |
| Kuban Krasnodar | Total | | 56 | 1 | 1 | 0 | 0 | 0 | 0 | 0 | 57 | 1 |
| Spartak Nalchik | 2011–12 | Russian Premier League | 11 | 0 | – | | – | | – | | 11 | 0 |
| Khimki | 2012–13 | FNL | 12 | 0 | 0 | 0 | – | | – | | 12 | 0 |
| Torpedo Moscow | 2013–14 | FNL | 1 | 0 | 1 | 0 | – | | – | | 2 | 0 |
| Torpedo Moscow | 2014–15 | Russian Premier League | 1 | 0 | 0 | 0 | – | | – | | 1 | 0 |
| Torpedo Moscow | Total | | 2 | 0 | 1 | 0 | 0 | 0 | 0 | 0 | 3 | 0 |
| Isloch Minsk Raion | 2016 | Belarusian Premier League | 14 | 0 | 0 | 0 | – | | – | | 14 | 0 |
| Amkar Perm | 2016–17 | Russian Premier League | 0 | 0 | 0 | 0 | – | | – | | 0 | 0 |
| Anzhi Makhachkala | 2017–18 | Russian Premier League | 11 | 0 | 0 | 0 | – | | 1 (Note: One appearance in relegation play-offs) | 0 | 12 | 0 |
| Career total | | | 166 | 1 | 6 | 0 | 0 | 0 | 1 | 0 | 173 | 1 |
