= Igor Armaș =

Moldovan footballer

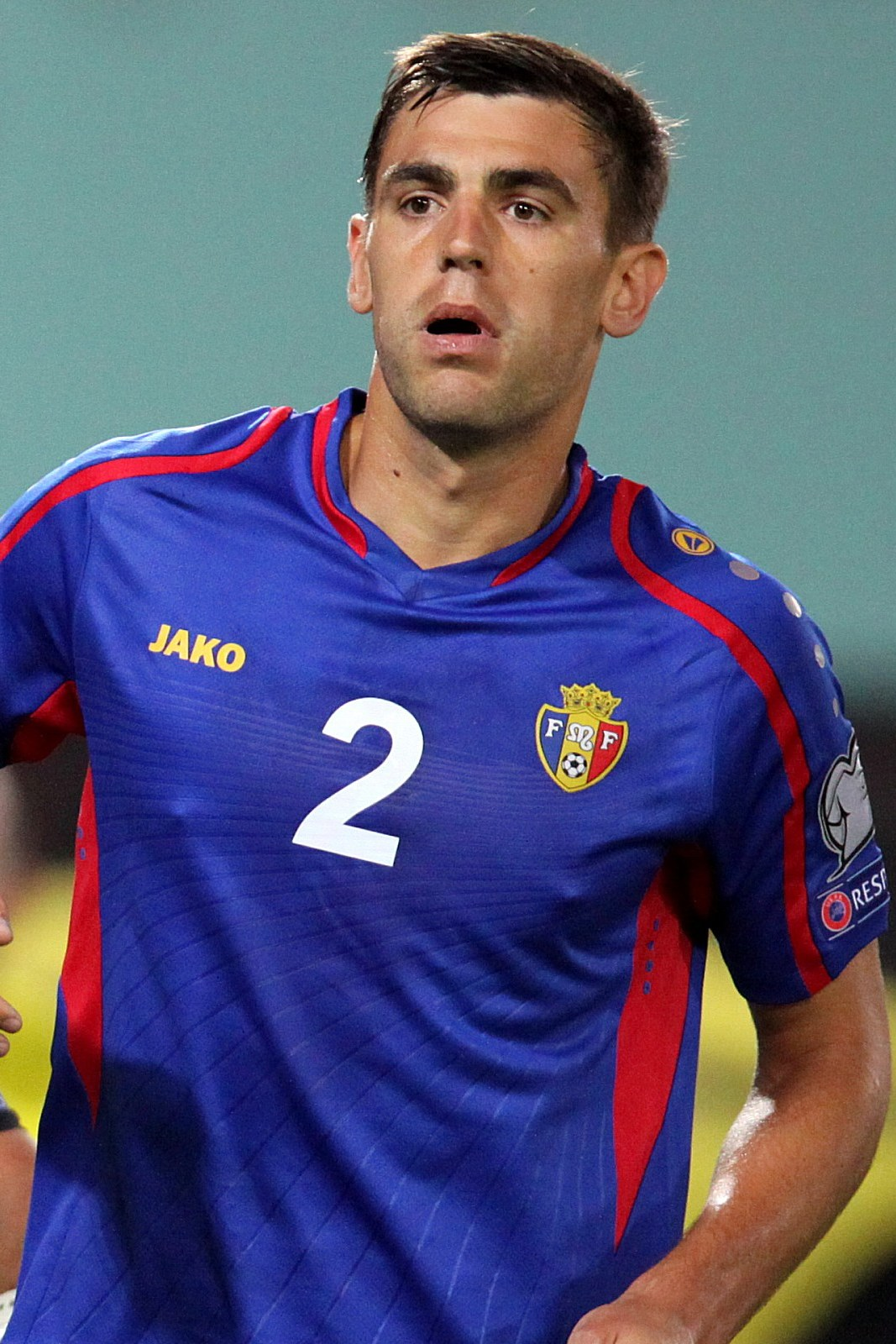
- Armaș with Moldova in 2015

Personal information
- Date of birth: 14 July 1987 (age 39)
- Place of birth: Căușeni, Moldavian SSR, Soviet Union
- Height: 1.94 m (6 ft 4 in)
- Position: Centre-back

Team information
- Current team: Voluntari (sporting director)

Youth career
- –2006: Zimbru Chișinău

Senior career*
Years	Team	Apps	(Gls)
2004–2007	Zimbru-2 Chișinău	30	(2)
2007–2008	Zimbru Chișinău	30	(1)
2009–2010	Hammarby	27	(0)
2010–2017	Kuban Krasnodar	155	(5)
2017–2018	Anzhi Makhachkala	13	(1)
2018–2025	Voluntari	215	(12)
Total		470	(21)

International career
2008–2023	Moldova	83	(6)

Managerial career
- 2025–: Voluntari (sporting director)
- * Club domestic league appearances and goals

Igor Armaș (Romanian pronunciation: [ˈar.maʃ]; born 14 July 1987) is a former Moldovan professional footballer who played as a centre-back, currently sporting director at Liga I club Voluntari.

== Career ==
After a successful season in FC Zimbru, Armaș signed a four-year contract with Swedish club Hammarby IF.

In November 2009 he was elected the club's Player of the year by the fans on Hammarby's official website.

In January 2010, Armaș signed for Russian club, Kuban Krasnodar. In the 2013–14 season, Armaș played in the group stage of the UEFA Europa League. He made two assists in a match against St. Gallen. During WCQ with the Republic of Ireland Armaș suffered a fractured leg.

In March 2023, Armaș announced his retirement from the Moldova national football team.

== Career statistics ==
=== Club ===
As of match played 27 August 2025

Appearances and goals by club, season and competition
Club	Season	League			National cup (Note: Includes Svenska Cupen, Russian Cup, Cupa României)		Europe		Other		Total	
Club	Season	Division	Apps	Goals	Apps	Goals	Apps	Goals	Apps	Goals	Apps	Goals
Zimbru-2 Chișinău	2004–05	Divizia A	5	0	—		—		—		5	0
Zimbru-2 Chișinău	2005–06	Divizia A	13	1	—		—		—		13	1
Zimbru-2 Chișinău	2006–07	Divizia A	12	1	—		—		—		12	1
Zimbru-2 Chișinău	Total		30	2	—		—		—		30	2
Zimbru Chișinău	2006–07	Divizia Națională	6	0	0	0	0	0	—		6	0
Zimbru Chișinău	2007–08	Divizia Națională	7	0	0	0	0	0	—		7	0
Zimbru Chișinău	2008–09	Divizia Națională	17	1	0	0	—		—		17	1
Zimbru Chișinău	Total		30	1	0	0	0	0	—		30	1
Hammarby	2009	Allsvenskan	27	0	1	0	—		—		28	0
Kuban Krasnodar	2010	FNL	32	2	0	0	—		—		32	2
Kuban Krasnodar	2011–12	Russian Premier League	39	1	1	0	—		—		40	1
Kuban Krasnodar	2012–13	Russian Premier League	16	0	1	0	—		—		17	0
Kuban Krasnodar	2013–14	Russian Premier League	14	1	1	0	3 (Note: Appearances in UEFA Europa League)	0	—		18	1
Kuban Krasnodar	2014–15	Russian Premier League	15	0	3	0	—		—		18	0
Kuban Krasnodar	2015–16	Russian Premier League	25	1	1	0	—		2 (Note: Appearances in relegation play-offs.)	1	28	2
Kuban Krasnodar	2016–17	FNL	14	0	0	0	—		—		14	0
Kuban Krasnodar	Total		155	5	7	0	3	0	2	1	167	6
Anzhi Makhachkala	2017–18	Russian Premier League	13	1	0	0	—		2	0	15	1
Voluntari	2018–19	Liga I	25	3	1	0	—		—		26	3
Voluntari	2019–20	Liga I	21	0	1	0	—		—		22	0
Voluntari	2020–21	Liga I	34	1	0	0	—		2 (Note: Appearances in Liga I promotion/relegation play-offs)	1	36	2
Voluntari	2021–22	Liga I	38	1	5	1	—		—		43	2
Voluntari	2022–23	Liga I	38	0	3	0	—		1 (Note: Appearance in Liga I European play-offs)	0	42	0
Voluntari	2023–24	Liga I	30	2	3	0	—		—		33	2
Voluntari	2024–25	Liga II	29	5	1	0	—		2	0	32	5
Voluntari	2025–26	Liga II	0	0	2	0	—		—		2	0
Voluntari	Total		215	12	16	1	—		5	1	236	14
Career total			470	21	24	1	3	0	9	2	506	24

=== International ===
As of match played 20 November 2022

Appearances and goals by national team and year
National team	Year	Apps	Goals
Moldova	2008	6	0
Moldova	2009	7	0
Moldova	2010	1	0
Moldova	2011	10	1
Moldova	2012	4	0
Moldova	2013	4	1
Moldova	2014	7	1
Moldova	2015	8	0
Moldova	2016	4	1
Moldova	2017	1	0
Moldova	2018	0	0
Moldova	2019	5	1
Moldova	2020	9	0
Moldova	2021	8	0
Moldova	2022	9	1
Total		83	6

Scores and results list Moldova's goal tally first, score column indicates score after each Armaș goal.

List of international goals scored by Igor Armaș
No.	Date	Venue	Opponent	Score	Result	Competition
1	10 August 2011	GSP Stadium, Strovolos, Cyprus	Cyprus	1–1	2–3	Friendly
2	15 October 2013	Stadion Pod Goricom, Podgorica, Montenegro	Montenegro	2–1	5–2	2014 FIFA World Cup qualification
3	24 May 2014	Estadio Municipal de Chapín, Jerez, Spain	Saudi Arabia	1–0	4–0	Friendly
4	28 March 2016	Ta' Qali National Stadium, Mdina, Malta	Andorra	1–0	1–0	Friendly
5	8 June 2019	Zimbru Stadium, Chișinău, Moldova	Andorra	1–0	1–0	UEFA Euro 2020 qualification
6	29 March 2022	Astana Arena, Nur-Sultan, Kazakhstan	Kazakhstan	1–0	1–0 (a.e.t.) ( 4–5 p)	2020-21 UEFA Nations League C

== Honours ==
Zimbru 2 Chișinău

- Divizia "A": 2005–06, 2006–07

Zimbru Chișinău

- Moldovan Cup: 2006–07
- Moldovan Super Cup runner-up: 2007

Kuban Krasnodar

- Russian First Division: 2010
- Russian Cup runner-up: 2014–15

Voluntari

- Cupa României runner-up: 2021–22
