= Aleksei Kozlov (footballer, born 1986) =

Russian footballer

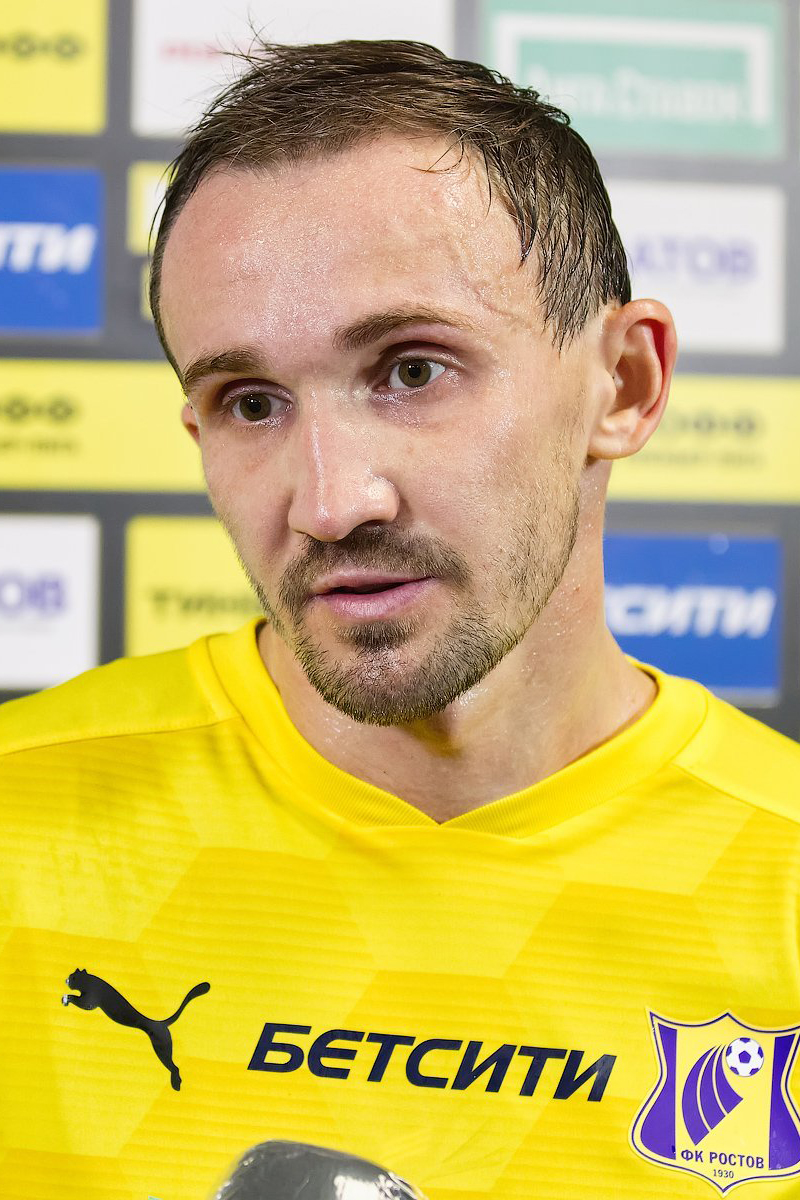
- Kozlov with Rostov in 2020

Personal information
- Full name: Aleksei Anatolyevich Kozlov
- Date of birth: 25 December 1986 (age 39)
- Place of birth: Petrozavodsk, Russian SFSR
- Height: 1.86 m (6 ft 1 in)
- Position: Right-back

Youth career
- Zarya Naberezhnye Chelny
- 2001–2002: Neftekhimik Nizhnekamsk
- 2002–2004: Hamburger SV

Senior career*
Years	Team	Apps	(Gls)
2004–2006	ASV Bergedorf 85	41	(6)
2006	VfB Lübeck	0	(0)
2007–2010	KAMAZ Naberezhnye Chelny	70	(3)
2010–2013	Kuban Krasnodar	91	(0)
2014–2019	Dynamo Moscow	104	(6)
2019–2021	Rostov	48	(1)
2021–2022	Nizhny Novgorod	22	(4)

International career
2013–2015	Russia	14	(0)
- * Club domestic league appearances and goals

Aleksei Anatolyevich Kozlov (Russian: Алексей Анатольевич Козлов; born 25 December 1986) is a Russian former footballer. He played as right-back.

== Club career ==
Kozlov made his professional debut in the Russian First Division in 2007 for FC KAMAZ Naberezhnye Chelny.

On 24 June 2019, he left FC Dynamo Moscow after 5.5 seasons upon the expiration of his contract.

On 3 July 2019, he signed with FC Rostov.

On 9 July 2021, he joined Nizhny Novgorod, newly promoted into the Russian Premier League.

== International ==
On 7 June 2013, Kozlov made his debut appearance for Russian national team under manager Fabio Capello in World Cup qualification away game versus Portugal (0-1). He entered the pitch on 31 min when starting right-back Aleksandr Anyukov picked up an injury.

On 2 June 2014, he was included in the Russia's 2014 FIFA World Cup squad. He played in the last two group games against Belgium and Algeria as Russia did not advance past the group stage.

== Individual honours ==
- List of 33 top players of the Russian league: #3 (2013/14).

== Career statistics ==
As of 21 May 2022

Club	Season	League			Cup		Continental		Total	
Club	Season	Division	Apps	Goals	Apps	Goals	Apps	Goals	Apps	Goals
ASV Bergedorf	2004–05	Oberliga Nord	11	4	–		–		11	4
ASV Bergedorf	2005–06	Oberliga Nord	30	2	–		–		30	2
ASV Bergedorf	Total		41	6	0	0	0	0	41	6
KAMAZ	2007	FNL	2	0	0	0	–		2	0
KAMAZ	2008	FNL	14	1	1	0	–		15	1
KAMAZ	2009	FNL	31	1	1	0	–		32	1
KAMAZ	2010	FNL	23	1	1	0	–		24	1
KAMAZ	Total		70	3	3	0	0	0	73	3
Kuban Krasnodar	2010	FNL	13	0	–		–		13	0
Kuban Krasnodar	2011–12	RPL	35	0	1	0	–		36	0
Kuban Krasnodar	2012–13	RPL	25	0	1	0	–		26	0
Kuban Krasnodar	2013–14	RPL	18	0	0	0	10 (Note: Appearances in the UEFA Europa League)	0	28	0
Kuban Krasnodar	Total		91	0	2	0	10	0	103	0
Dynamo Moscow	2013–14	RPL	6	0	–		–		6	0
Dynamo Moscow	2014–15	RPL	12	0	0	0	7	1	19	1
Dynamo Moscow	2015–16	RPL	22	4	2	0	–		24	4
Dynamo Moscow	2016–17	FNL	16	0	1	0	–		17	0
Dynamo Moscow	2017–18	RPL	25	1	0	0	–		25	1
Dynamo Moscow	2018–19	RPL	23	1	1	0	–		24	1
Dynamo Moscow	Total		104	6	4	0	7	1	115	7
Rostov	2019–20	RPL	24	0	0	0	–		24	0
Rostov	2020–21	RPL	24	1	1	0	1	0	26	1
Rostov	Total		48	1	1	0	1	0	50	1
Nizhny Novgorod	2021–22	RPL	22	4	0	0	–		22	4
Career total			376	20	10	0	18	1	404	21
