= Aleksandr Prudnikov =

Russian footballer

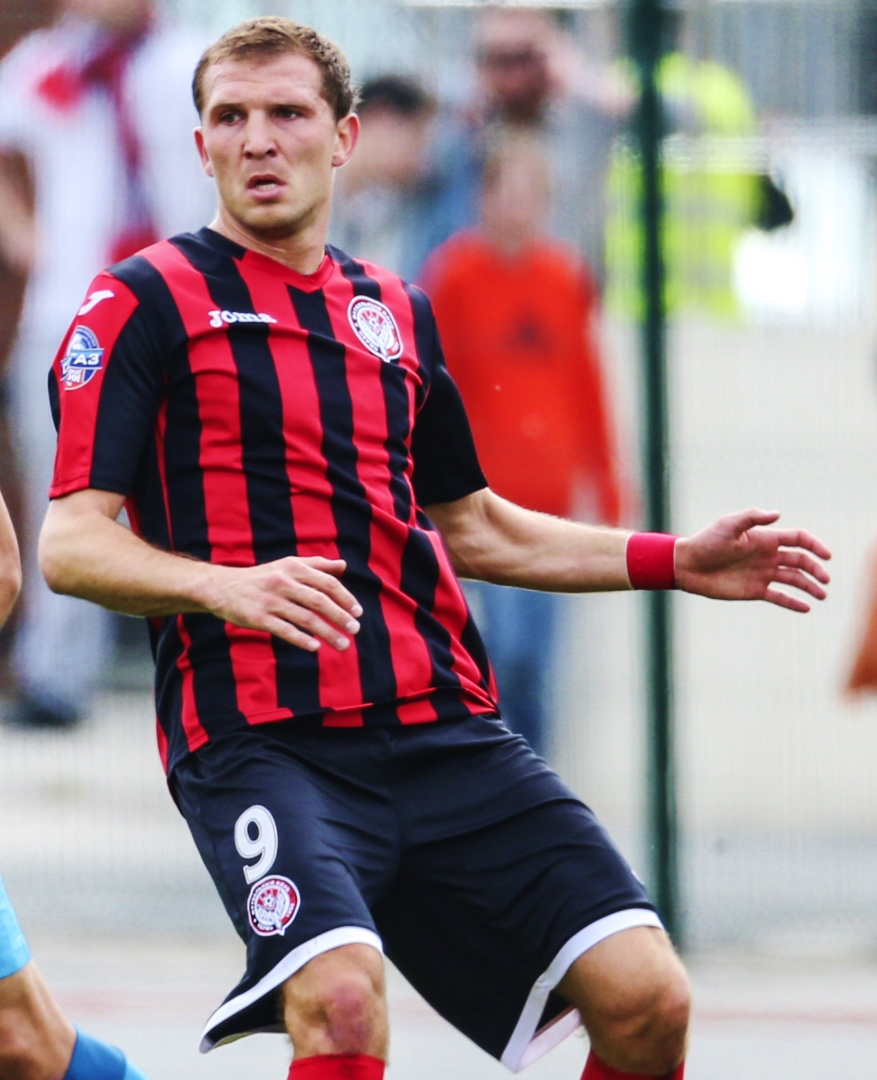
- Prudnikov with Amkar in 2015

Personal information
- Full name: Aleksandr Aleksandrovich Prudnikov
- Date of birth: 26 February 1989 (age 37)
- Place of birth: Smolensk, USSR
- Height: 1.85 m (6 ft 1 in)
- Position: Forward

Youth career
- 2005–2007: Spartak Moscow

Senior career*
Years	Team	Apps	(Gls)
2007–2012	Spartak Moscow	33	(4)
2009	→ Terek Grozny (loan)	7	(0)
2009	→ Sparta Prague (loan)	8	(0)
2010	→ Tom Tomsk (loan)	6	(0)
2011–2012	→ Anzhi Makhachkala (loan)	19	(3)
2012	Kuban Krasnodar	2	(0)
2013	Alania Vladikavkaz	3	(0)
2013–2014	Rubin Kazan	17	(3)
2014	Dynamo Moscow	6	(0)
2015–2016	Amkar Perm	41	(6)
2016	Orenburg	4	(0)
2017–2018	Anzhi Makhachkala	29	(4)
2018	Spartaks Jūrmala	9	(4)
2019	Alashkert	12	(3)
2019	Vitebsk	8	(1)

International career
2005–2006	Russia U17	10	(7)
2007	Russia U19	9	(6)
2007–2010	Russia U21	18	(6)
2011–2012	Russia-2	3	(1)
- * Club domestic league appearances and goals

Aleksandr Aleksandrovich Prudnikov (Russian: Александр Александрович Прудников; born 26 February 1989) is a Russian former footballer who played as a forward.

== Career ==
=== Club ===
On 8 April 2007, he made his debut for Spartak first team, scoring a winning goal in the game against Luch Vladivostok.

On 22 April 2007, Chelsea FC sporting director Frank Arnesen while visiting Moscow told the Russian sports newspaper Sovietskiy sport after the match against FC Krylya Sovetov Samara, that he liked the way Prudnikov performed in the game. FC Spartak Moscow sold on loan the striker, already with Russia's national team moves to FC Terek Grozny.

On 15 July 2009, Prudnikov agreed to join Czech giants Sparta Prague on a one-year-long loan deal. However, the contract was terminated after half a year.

On 31 March 2010, Prudnikov was loaned to FC Tom Tomsk.

As of 21 June 2013, it was confirmed that Prudnikov was on trial with FC Rubin Kazan in order to try and win a contract. He travelled with the club to their pre-season tour of Austria and started up front in a pre-season friendly against FC Steaua București on 22 June 2013. He signed for the club not long after, and scored on his debut away to FK Jagodina in the UEFA Europa League.

On 16 July 2014, FC Dynamo Moscow announced signing Prudnikov on a 1-year deal.

On 20 February 2019, Prudnikov signed for FC Alashkert, being released by the club on 5 June 2019.

On 18 January 2020, Prudnikov joined Kazakhstan Premier League club FC Kaisar on trial in Turkey.

=== International ===
Prudnikov was one of the stars of the Russian U-17 squad that won the 2006 UEFA U-17 Championship. He was a part of the Russia U-21 side that was competing in the 2011 European Under-21 Championship qualification.

== Career statistics ==
As of 20 May 2018

Club	Season	League			Cup		Continental		Other		Total	
Club	Season	Division	Apps	Goals	Apps	Goals	Apps	Goals	Apps	Goals	Apps	Goals
Spartak Moscow	2005	Russian Premier League	0	0	0	0	–		–		0	0
Spartak Moscow	2006	Russian Premier League	0	0	0	0	0	0	–		0	0
Spartak Moscow	2007	Russian Premier League	12	2	3	1	2	0	–		17	3
Spartak Moscow	2008	Russian Premier League	21	2	2	1	6	0	–		29	3
Terek Grozny	2009	Russian Premier League	7	0	–		–		–		7	0
Sparta Prague	2009–10	Czech First League	8	0	0	0	6	0	–		14	0
Tom Tomsk	2010	Russian Premier League	6	0	0	0	–		–		6	0
Spartak Moscow	2010	Russian Premier League	0	0	0	0	–		–		0	0
Spartak Moscow	Total (2 spells)		33	4	5	2	8	0	0	0	46	3
Anzhi Makhachkala	2011–12	Russian Premier League	19	3	2	0	–		–		21	3
Kuban Krasnodar	2012–13	Russian Premier League	2	0	2	1	–		–		4	1
Alania Vladikavkaz	2012–13	Russian Premier League	3	0	–		–		–		3	0
Rubin Kazan	2013–14	Russian Premier League	17	3	1	0	10	3	–		28	6
Dynamo Moscow	2014–15	Russian Premier League	6	0	1	0	4	0	–		11	0
Amkar Perm	2014–15	Russian Premier League	13	4	–		–		–		13	4
Amkar Perm	2015–16	Russian Premier League	29	2	3	1	–		–		32	3
Amkar Perm	Total		42	6	3	1	0	0	0	0	45	7
Orenburg	2016–17	Russian Premier League	4	0	0	0	–		–		4	0
Anzhi Makhachkala	2016–17	Russian Premier League	10	3	1	0	–		–		11	3
Anzhi Makhachkala	2017–18	Russian Premier League	19	1	0	0	–		1 (Note: One appearance in relegation play-offs)	0	20	1
Anzhi Makhachkala	Total (2 spells)		48	7	3	0	0	0	1	0	52	7
Career total			176	20	15	4	28	3	1	0	220	27

== Honours ==
National Championships:

Czech Republic League (Chance league): 2009/2010

Nations Cups:

Armenian Cup: 2018/2019

International Championships:

Under-17 European Champion (2006)
