= Aleksey Skvernyuk =

Belarusian footballer (born 1985)

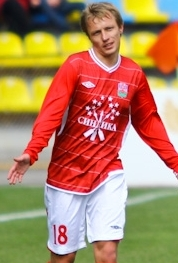

Personal information
- Full name: Aleksey Skvernyuk
- Date of birth: 13 October 1985 (age 41)
- Place of birth: Minsk, Soviet Union
- Height: 1.71 m (5 ft 7 in)
- Position: Midfielder

Youth career
- 2002–2003: Zvezda-VA-BGU Minsk

Senior career*
Years	Team	Apps	(Gls)
2003	Zvezda-VA-BGU Minsk	29	(8)
2004–2008	Krylia Sovetov Samara	46	(3)
2008–2011	Kuban Krasnodar	45	(4)
2011–2012	Spartak Nalchik	6	(0)
2012	Slavia Mozyr	10	(1)
2013	Ufa	6	(0)
2014	Smorgon	20	(2)
2015–2016	Belshina Bobruisk	49	(6)

International career
2004–2006	Belarus U21	17	(1)
2007–2008	Belarus	7	(0)
- * Club domestic league appearances and goals as of 31 December 2016

Aleksey Skvernyuk (Belarusian: Аляксей Сквярнюк; Russian: Алексей Сквернюк; born 13 October 1985) is a Belarusian former football player.

== International career ==
Skvernyuk has played for Belarus national football team seven times.
