= Sergei Ponomarenko (footballer) =

Russian footballer

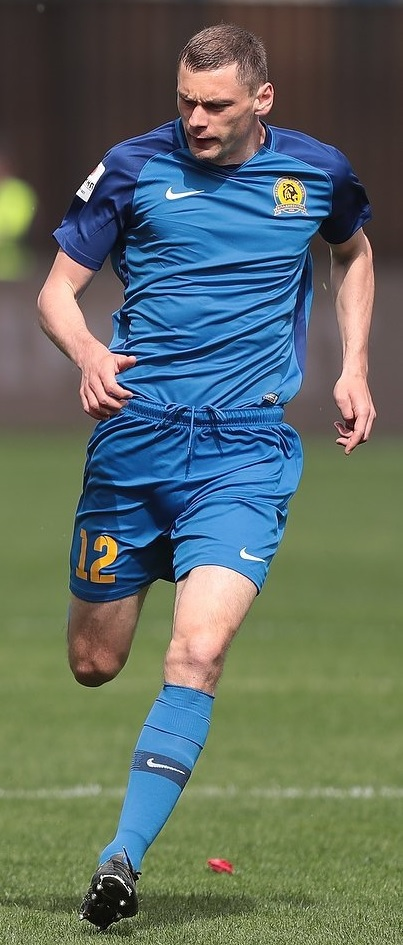
- Ponomarenko with Luch Vladivostok in 2019

Personal information
- Full name: Sergei Yuryevich Ponomarenko
- Date of birth: 12 January 1987 (age 39)
- Place of birth: Moscow, Russian SFSR
- Height: 1.85 m (6 ft 1 in)
- Positions: Defender; defensive midfielder

Senior career*
Years	Team	Apps	(Gls)
2007–2010	FC Nika Moscow	84	(2)
2010	→ FC Khimki (loan)	35	(2)
2011	FC Krylia Sovetov Samara	20	(0)
2013–2020	FC Luch Vladivostok	185	(3)
2020	FC Zenit Irkutsk	12	(0)
- * Club domestic league appearances and goals

Sergei Yuryevich Ponomarenko (Russian: Серге́й Юрьевич Пономаренко; born 12 January 1987) is a Russian former professional football player.

== Club career ==
He made his Russian Premier League debut for FC Krylia Sovetov Samara on 12 March 2011 in a game against PFC Spartak Nalchik. He was then transferred to FC Luch Vladivostok later on in his career
