= Rustem Kalimullin =

Russian footballer

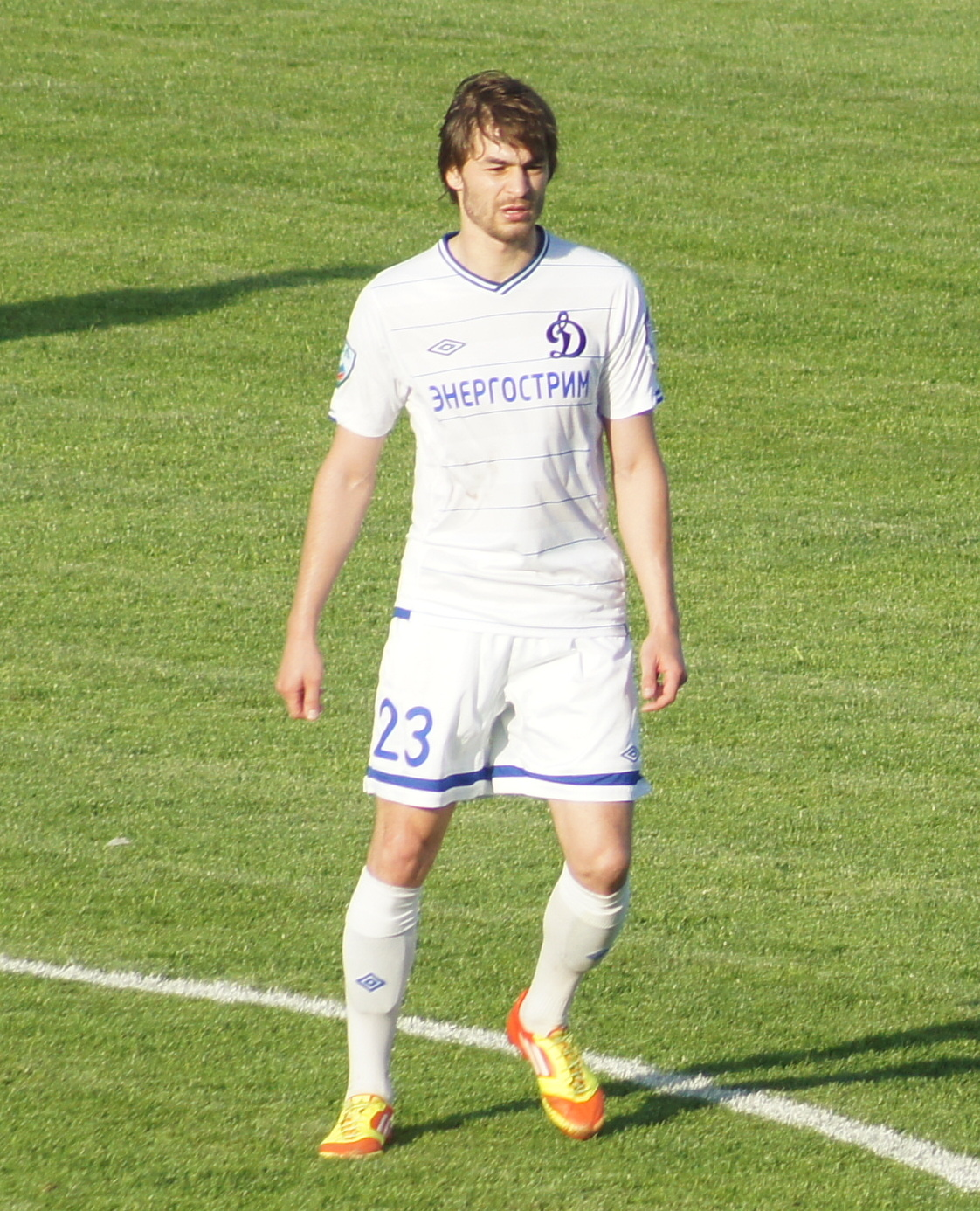
- Rustem Kalimullin in Dynamo (Bryansk) 2012

Personal information
- Full name: Rustem Rashitovich Kalimullin
- Date of birth: 24 June 1984 (age 42)
- Height: 1.78 m (5 ft 10 in)
- Position: Forward

Youth career
- –2001: FC KAMAZ Naberezhnye Chelny

Senior career*
Years	Team	Apps	(Gls)
2002–2009	FC KAMAZ Naberezhnye Chelny	181	(39)
2008–2009	→ PFC Spartak Nalchik (loan)	41	(6)
2010–2011	FC Kuban Krasnodar	28	(8)
2011–2012	FC Dynamo Bryansk	29	(4)
2012	FC Khimki	9	(2)
2014	FC KAMAZ Naberezhnye Chelny	8	(5)
2014	FC Avangard Kursk	10	(0)
2015	Ulisses FC	9	(1)

International career
2004	Russia U-21	2	(0)
- * Club domestic league appearances and goals

Rustem Rashitovich Kalimullin (Russian: Рустем Рашитович Калимуллин, Tatar: Ростэм Рашит улы Калимуллин; born 24 June 1984) is a Russian former footballer of Tatar origin.

== Club career ==
He transferred to Dynamo Bryansk after playing for FC Kuban Krasnodar in the first game of the 2011–12 season in the Russian Premier League.
