= Yevgeny Ovsiyenko =

Russian footballer

Yevgeni Ovsiyenko
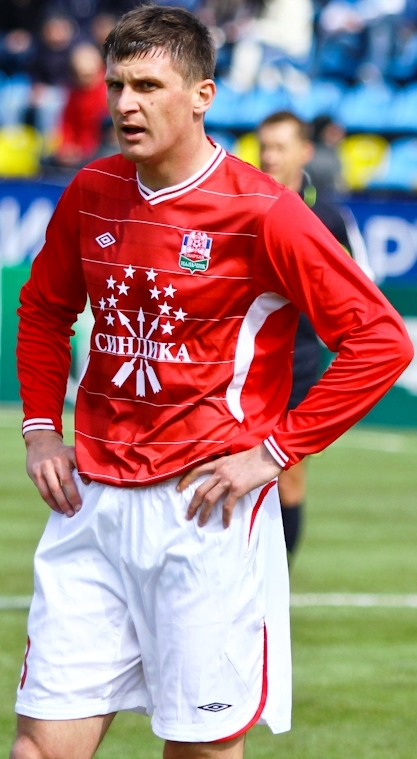
- Ovsiyenko with Spartak Nalchik in 2012

Personal information
- Full name: Yevgeni Vladimirovich Ovsiyenko
- Date of birth: 18 January 1988 (age 38)
- Place of birth: Krasnodar, Russian SFSR
- Height: 1.88 m (6 ft 2 in)
- Position: Defender

Senior career*
| Years | Team | Apps | (Gls) |
| 2005–2008 | FC Krasnodar-2000 | 83 | (3) |
| 2009–2010 | FC Irtysh Omsk | 61 | (1) |
| 2011–2013 | PFC Spartak Nalchik | 72 | (0) |
| 2014–2016 | FC Baltika Kaliningrad | 69 | (0) |
| 2016–2019 | FC Tambov | 82 | (2) |
| 2019 | FC Baltika Kaliningrad | 2 | (0) |
| 2020 | FC Kuban Krasnodar | 11 | (0) |
| 2021 | FC Pioner Leningradskaya | | |
| 2021 | FC Kuban-Holding Pavlovskaya | 5 | (0) |
- * Club domestic league appearances and goals

Yevgeni Vladimirovich Ovsiyenko (Russian: Евгений Владимирович Овсиенко; born 18 January 1988) is a Russian former professional football player.
