= Russia national football B team =

National football team

Russia B team
- Nickname: Vtoraya sbornaya
- Association: Russian Football Union
- Confederation: UEFA (Europe)
- Head coach: Vacant
First colours	Second colours

The Russia national football B team, also known as the Russia-2 national football team (Russian: Сборная команда Россия-2), is a secondary team for Russia in association football. The team is controlled by the Russian Football Union. It was founded in 2011. In late 2012, after Sergei Fursenko was replaced by Nikolai Tolstykh as the president of the Russian Football Union, the team was dismantled, at least for the immediate future.

On 28 February 2022, due to the 2022 Russian invasion of Ukraine and in accordance with a recommendation by the International Olympic Committee (IOC), FIFA and UEFA suspended the participation of Russia, including in the Qatar 2022 World Cup. The Russian Football Union unsuccessfully appealed the FIFA and UEFA bans to the Court of Arbitration for Sport, which upheld the bans.

== Results ==
Date	Venue	Opponent	Result	Notes
10 Aug 2011	Lokomotiv Stadium, Nizhny Novgorod	Russia U-21	2–1	Friendly
05 Sep 2011	Dynamo Stadium, Bryansk	Belarus U-23	0–0	Friendly
10 Oct 2011	Traktar Stadium, Minsk	Belarus U-23	3–2	Friendly
12 Nov 2011	Akhmat-Arena, Grozny	Lithuania	2–0	Friendly
15 Aug 2012	KAMAZ Stadium, Naberezhnye Chelny	Belgium U-19	4–0	Friendly
09 Sep 2012	Olimp-2, Rostov-on-Don	Turkey A2	4–1	Friendly

== Last squad ==
This is the squad called up for a friendly game on 9 September 2012 against Turkey A2.

Caps and goals correct as of 9 September 2012 after the Turkey A2 game.

No.	Pos.	Player	Date of birth (age)	Caps	Goals	Club
1	GK	Aleksandr Belenov	13 September 1986 (age 39)	1	0	(Russian Football Union) Kuban
12	GK	Sergei Pesyakov	16 December 1988 (age 37)	2	0	(Russian Football Union) Spartak Moscow
2	DF	Vitali Dyakov	31 January 1989 (age 37)	2	0	(Russian Football Union) Rostov
3	DF	Inal Getigezhev	23 May 1987 (age 38)	3	0	(Russian Football Union) Rubin Kazan
5	DF	Vladimir Rykov	13 November 1987 (age 38)	1	1	(Russian Football Union) Torpedo Moscow
6	DF	Vladimir Granat	22 May 1987 (age 38)	4	0	(Russian Football Union) Dynamo Moscow
13	DF	Vladimir Khozin	3 July 1989 (age 36)	1	0	(Russian Football Union) Ural
14	DF	Viktor Vasin	6 October 1988 (age 37)	2	0	(Russian Football Union) Mordovia Saransk
4	MF	Sergey Belousov	4 May 1990 (age 35)	2	0	(Russian Football Union) Rostov
7	MF	Georgy Gabulov	4 September 1988 (age 37)	1	0	(Russian Football Union) Krylya Sovetov
15	MF	Vladislav Ignatyev	20 January 1987 (age 39)	2	1	(Russian Football Union) Kuban
10	MF	Aleksei Ionov	18 February 1989 (age 37)	5	4	(Russian Football Union) Dynamo Moscow
18	MF	Vladislav Kulik	27 February 1985 (age 41)	2	0	(Russian Football Union) Kuban
19	MF	Dmitri Malyaka	15 January 1990 (age 36)	1	0	(Russian Football Union) Rostov
20	MF	Aleksandr Sapeta	28 June 1989 (age 36)	5	1	(Russian Football Union) Dynamo Moscow
8	FW	Kirill Pogrebnyak	27 June 1992 (age 33)	0	0	(Russian Football Union) Tom
8	FW	Vladimir Dyadyun	12 July 1988 (age 37)	2	1	(Russian Football Union) Rubin Kazan
8	FW	Kirill Panchenko	16 October 1989 (age 36)	2	2	(Russian Football Union) CSKA Moscow
9	FW	Dmitry Poloz	12 July 1991 (age 34)	1	0	(Russian Football Union) Rostov
17	FW	Aleksei Sapogov	2 April 1988 (age 37)	1	1	(Russian Football Union) Volga
18	FW	Nikita Burmistrov	6 July 1989 (age 36)	1	0	(Russian Football Union) Krasnodar

=== Previous call-ups ===
These players have been called up for the team in the last 12 months.

Pos.	Player	Date of birth (age)	Caps	Goals	Club	Latest call-up
GK	Dmitry Abakumov	8 July 1989 (age 36)	0	0	(Russia) Mordovia	15 August 2012, vs. Belgium U-19
GK	Yevgeny Pomazan	31 January 1989 (age 37)	2	0	(Russia) Anzhi	15 August 2012, vs. Belgium U-19
DF	Roman Bugayev	11 February 1989 (age 37)	2	0	(Russia) Kuban	15 August 2012, vs. Belgium U-19
DF	Ali Gadzhibekov	6 August 1989 (age 36)	5	0	(Russia) Anzhi	15 August 2012, vs. Belgium U-19
DF	Igor Smolnikov	8 August 1988 (age 37)	1	0	(Russia) Zenit Saint-Petersburg	15 August 2012, vs. Belgium U-19
MF	Nikita Bezlikhotnov	19 August 1990 (age 35)	1	0	(Russia) Torpedo Moscow	15 August 2012, vs. Belgium U-19
MF	Ivan Temnikov	28 January 1989 (age 37)	1	0	(Russia) Rubin	15 August 2012, vs. Belgium U-19
MF	Denis Tkachuk	2 July 1989 (age 36)	1	0	(Russia) Salyut	15 August 2012, vs. Belgium U-19
MF	Artur Yusupov	1 September 1989 (age 36)	3	0	(Russia) Dynamo Moscow	15 August 2012, vs. Belgium U-19
FW	Aleksandr Prudnikov	24 February 1989 (age 37)	3	1	(Russia) Dynamo Moscow	15 August 2012, vs. Belgium U-19

== Managers ==
- Yuri Krasnozhan (4 July 2011 – 26 Oct 2012)
