= Marco Né =

Ivorian footballer

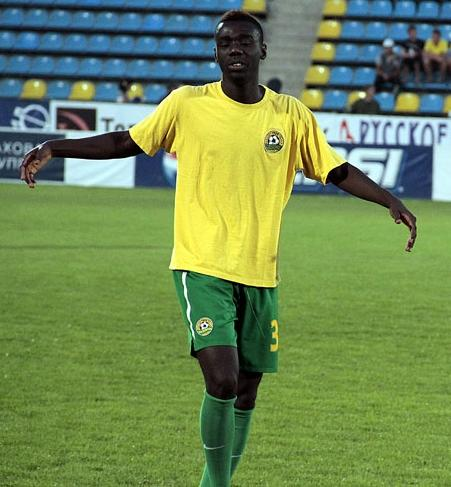

Personal information
- Full name: Marco Taddei Né
- Date of birth: July 17, 1983 (age 43)
- Place of birth: Abidjan, Ivory Coast
- Height: 1.83 m (6 ft 0 in)
- Position: Central midfielder

Youth career
- Académie de Sol Beni

Senior career*
Years	Team	Apps	(Gls)
2002–2003	ASEC Mimosas		
2003–2006	Beveren	64	(9)
2006–2008	Olympiacos	14	(0)
2008	Germinal Beerschot	9	(1)
2009–2011	FC Kuban Krasnodar	44	(2)
2012–2013	Tavriya Simferopol	13	(1)

International career
2004	Ivory Coast	1	(0)
- * Club domestic league appearances and goals

Marco Taddei Né (born 17 July 1983) is an Ivorian former football midfielder.

== Career ==
Né had a pre-season trial period with Arsenal F.C. in 2004 along with fellow Ivorian player Emmanuel Eboué, but unlike Eboué, Né failed to secure a transfer to the Premiership side.

He was signed by Olympiacos C.F.P. to replace Yaya Touré, who departed for AS Monaco, but failed to break into the first team due to constant injury problems for the majority of his spell at the club. Failing to leave an impression, Né was released by Olympiacos C.F.P. in the winter transfer period of 2008.

On 22 January 2009 Né signed a three-year contract with FC Kuban Krasnodar. In February he received a knee injury and missed the entire season.
