= Anton Lunin =

Russian footballer

Personal information
- Full name: Anton Anatolyevich Lunin
- Date of birth: 15 September 1986 (age 40)
- Height: 1.80 m (5 ft 11 in)
- Position: Midfielder

Youth career
- FC Baltika Kaliningrad

Senior career*
Years	Team	Apps	(Gls)
2004–2005	FC Baltika-2 Kaliningrad (amateur)		
2006–2007	FC Baltika-2 Kaliningrad	45	(6)
2008	FC Gubkin	21	(3)
2009	FC Dynamo Bryansk	27	(4)
2010	FC Kuban Krasnodar	17	(0)
2011	FC Torpedo Vladimir	4	(0)
2014	FC ArsenaL Bryansk		
2015	FC Oryol	1	(0)
- * Club domestic league appearances and goals

Anton Anatolyevich Lunin (Russian: Антон Анатольевич Лунин; born 15 September 1986) is a former Russian professional football player.

== Club career ==
He played two seasons in the Russian Football National League for FC Kuban Krasnodar and FC Torpedo Vladimir.
