= Ángel Dealbert =

Spanish footballer (born 1983)

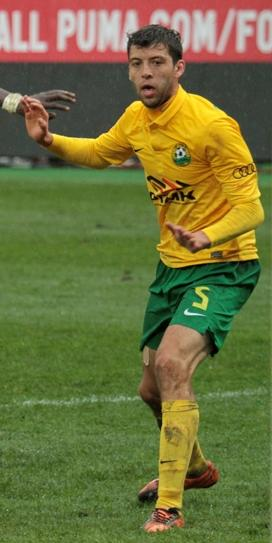
- Dealbert playing for Kuban in 2012

Personal information
- Full name: Ángel Dealbert Ibáñez
- Date of birth: 1 January 1983 (age 43)
- Place of birth: Benlloch, Spain
- Height: 1.85 m (6 ft 1 in)
- Position: Centre-back

Youth career
- 1996–2001: Castellón

Senior career*
Years	Team	Apps	(Gls)
2001–2002	Castellón B	18	(1)
2002–2009	Castellón	210	(2)
2009–2012	Valencia	49	(0)
2012–2014	Kuban	51	(2)
2014–2015	Baniyas	25	(1)
2015–2017	Lugo	41	(1)
2017–2018	Castellón	34	(0)
Total		428	(7)
- * Club domestic league appearances and goals

Ángel Dealbert Ibáñez (born 1 January 1983) is a Spanish former professional footballer who played as a central defender.

He spent most of his 17-year senior career at Castellón, representing the club in three levels of Spanish football while taking part in 220 competitive matches. He appeared for Valencia in La Liga, and also played in Russia and the United Arab Emirates.

== Club career ==
Born in Benlloch, Province of Castellón, Valencian Community, Dealbert began his career with local CD Castellón. He made his first-team debut on 20 April 2002 in a Segunda División B match against Benidorm CF, and went on to become an essential defensive element, winning promotion in the 2004–05 season and helping the club to consolidate in the Segunda División the following years.

In late December 2008, Valencia CF's sporting director Fernando Gómez, who played for both sides, announced the signing of Dealbert on a free transfer. However, the player was allowed to remain at Castellón until the end of the campaign.

After 24 La Liga games in his first year (34 in all competitions), Dealbert was used solely as a backup from 2010 to 2012, with the Che finishing third in all three seasons under Unai Emery. He made his debut in the Spanish top flight on 30 August 2009, playing the full 90 minutes in a 2–0 home win over Sevilla FC.

Dealbert signed a three-year contract with FC Kuban Krasnodar in June 2012. After two years as first-choice in the Russian Premier League, he left for Baniyas Club in the UAE Pro League.

Dealbert returned to his native country on 3 August 2015, moving to second-tier CD Lugo. He scored once from 36 appearances in his first year, helping to a 14th-place finish.

In summer 2017, the 34-year-old Dealbert returned to Castellón after eight years, with the club now in the Tercera División. Additionally, he became its co-owner alongside his former Valencia teammate Pablo Hernández, winning promotion at the first attempt and subsequently retiring, following which he was appointed their technical secretary; they both left due to disagreements regarding the team in April 2019, but kept their position as shareholders.

== Career statistics ==
Club	Season	League		Cup		Europe		Total	
Club	Season	Apps	Goals	Apps	Goals	Apps	Goals	Apps	Goals
Castellón	2001–02	3	0	0	0	-	-	3	0
Castellón	2002–03	7	0	-	-	-	-	7	0
Castellón	2003–04	39	2	1	0	-	-	40	2
Castellón	2004–05	28	0	3	0	-	-	31	0
Castellón	2005–06	21	0	1	0	-	-	22	0
Castellón	2006–07	35	0	1	0	-	-	36	0
Castellón	2007–08	37	0	1	0	-	-	38	0
Castellón	2008–09	40	0	3	0	-	-	43	0
Castellón	Total	210	2	10	0	-	-	220	2
Valencia	2009–10	24	0	3	0	7	0	34	0
Valencia	2010–11	14	0	4	0	1	0	19	0
Valencia	2011–12	11	0	1	0	4	0	16	0
Valencia	Total	49	0	8	0	12	0	69	0
Kuban	2012–13	28	1	3	0	0	0	31	1
Kuban	2013–14	23	1	0	0	8	0	31	1
Kuban	Total	51	2	3	0	8	0	62	2
Career totals		310	4	21	0	20	0	351	4
