= Maksim Shevchenko (footballer, born 1983) =

Russian footballer

Personal information
- Full name: Maksim Aleksandrovich Shevchenko
- Date of birth: 11 February 1983 (age 43)
- Place of birth: Yeysk, Russian SFSR
- Height: 1.77 m (5 ft 10 in)
- Position: Midfielder

Team information
- Current team: FC Kuban-Holding Pavlovskaya (assistant coach)

Senior career*
Years	Team	Apps	(Gls)
1999–2001	FC Tsentr-R-Kavkaz (amateur)		
2002	FC Spartak Anapa	37	(2)
2003–2005	FC Krasnodar-2000	75	(8)
2005	FC Amur Blagoveshchensk	12	(1)
2006–2007	FC Baltika Kaliningrad	72	(2)
2008–2010	FC Salyut Belgorod	81	(5)
2010	FC Kuban Krasnodar	1	(0)
2011	FC Volgar-Gazprom Astrakhan	4	(0)
2011–2013	FC Salyut Belgorod	62	(1)
2014	FC Torpedo Armavir	11	(0)
2014	FC SKChF Sevastopol	16	(0)
2015	FC GNS-Spartak Krasnodar		
2015	FC Pioner Leningradskaya		
2016	FC Kuban-Holding Pavlovskaya		
2017	FC Vityaz-Memorial Starominskaya		
2017	FC Magnat Krasnodar		
2018	FC Spartak Rayevskaya		
2019	FC Kuban Holding-2 Pavlovskaya		

Managerial career
- 2020–: FC Kuban-Holding Pavlovskaya (assistant)
- 2022: FC Kuban-Holding Pavlovskaya (caretaker)
- * Club domestic league appearances and goals

Maksim Aleksandrovich Shevchenko (Russian: Максим Александрович Шевченко; born 11 February 1983) is a Russian professional football coach and a former player. He is an assistant coach with FC Kuban-Holding Pavlovskaya.

== Club career ==
He made his Russian Football National League debut for FC Amur Blagoveshchensk on 8 August 2005 in a game against FC Fakel Voronezh. He played 9 seasons in the FNL for Amur, FC Baltika Kaliningrad, FC Salyut Belgorod and FC Kuban Krasnodar.
