= Zelão =

Brazilian footballer

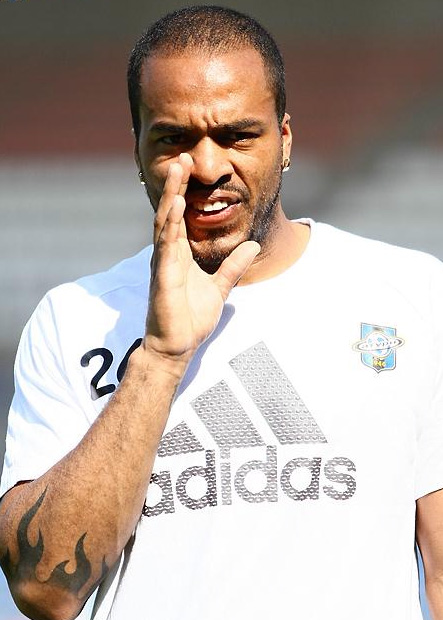

Personal information
- Full name: Luiz Ricardo da Silva
- Date of birth: 12 November 1984 (age 42)
- Place of birth: Pirajuí, Brazil
- Height: 1.88 m (6 ft 2 in)
- Position: Centre back

Senior career*
Years	Team	Apps	(Gls)
2003	Matonense		
2004	Palmeiras B		
2005	Noroeste		
2005–2007	Bragantino		
2007	Corinthians	10	(2)
2008–2010	Saturn Ramenskoye	75	(3)
2011–2012	Kuban Krasnodar	44	(3)
2013	Astana	28	(3)
2015	XV de Piracicaba	2	(0)
2016–2017	Penapolense	9	(0)
2017–2018	Barretos		
- * Club domestic league appearances and goals

Luiz Ricardo da Silva (born 12 November 1984), commonly known as Zelão, is a Brazilian former professional footballer who played as a centre back.

== Career ==
Zelão scored his first goal in the Campeonato Brasileiro against Santos on 3 June 2007 in a 1–1 draw.

On 31 January 2011, Zelão signed a four-year contract with FC Kuban Krasnodar. After two seasons with Kuban, Zelão left on 23 January 2013, and a week later signed for Kazakhstan Premier League side FC Astana.

In November 2014, Zelão was linked with a move to Guarani, but went on to sign for XV de Piracicaba in December.

== Career statistics ==
As of Match played 6 July 2014

Club performance			League		Cup		Continental		Other (Note: Includes other competitive competitions, including the Kazakhstan Super Cup)		Total	
Season	Club	League	Apps	Goals	Apps	Goals	Apps	Goals	Apps	Goals	Apps	Goals
2008	Saturn Ramenskoye	Russian Premier League	27	1	0	0	-		-		27	1
2009	Saturn Ramenskoye	Russian Premier League	26	1	0	0	-		-		26	1
2010	Saturn Ramenskoye	Russian Premier League	22	1	1	0	-		-		23	1
2011–12	Kuban Krasnodar	Russian Premier League	33	3	1	0	-		-		34	3
2012–13	Kuban Krasnodar	Russian Premier League	11	0	1	0	-		-		12	0
2013	Astana	Kazakhstan Premier League	28	3	1	0	2	0	1	0	32	3
Total	Russia		119	6	3	0	-		-		122	6
Total	Kazakhstan		28	3	1	0	2	0	1	0	32	3
Career total			147	9	4	0	2	0	1	0	151	9

== Honours ==
Astana

- Kazakhstan Super Cup: Runner-up 2013
