= Anton Sekret =

Russian footballer

Personal information
- Full name: Anton Gennadyevich Sekret
- Date of birth: 23 January 1992 (age 34)
- Place of birth: Bryukhovetskaya, Krasnodar Krai, Russia
- Height: 1.85 m (6 ft 1 in)
- Position: Midfielder

Youth career
- 2006–2010: Krasnodar-2000

Senior career*
Years	Team	Apps	(Gls)
2009–2010	Krasnodar-2000	32	(5)
2011–2014	Kuban Krasnodar	3	(1)
2012	→ Volgar Astrakhan (loan)	8	(0)
2013	→ Torpedo-BelAZ Zhodino (loan)	9	(1)
2013	→ SKVO Rostov-on-Don (loan)	10	(0)
2015–2016	Ocean Kerch	33	(3)
2016	FC Kubanskaya Korona Shevchenko		
2017–2019	FC Kolos Tsentralny		
- * Club domestic league appearances and goals

Anton Gennadyevich Sekret (Russian: Антон Геннадьевич Секрет; born 23 January 1992) is a Russian former professional football player.

== Club career ==
He made his debut in the Russian Premier League on 31 March 2012 for FC Kuban Krasnodar in a game against PFC CSKA Moscow and scored a late equalizer to bring his team a point in a 1–1 draw.
