= David Tsorayev =

Russian footballer

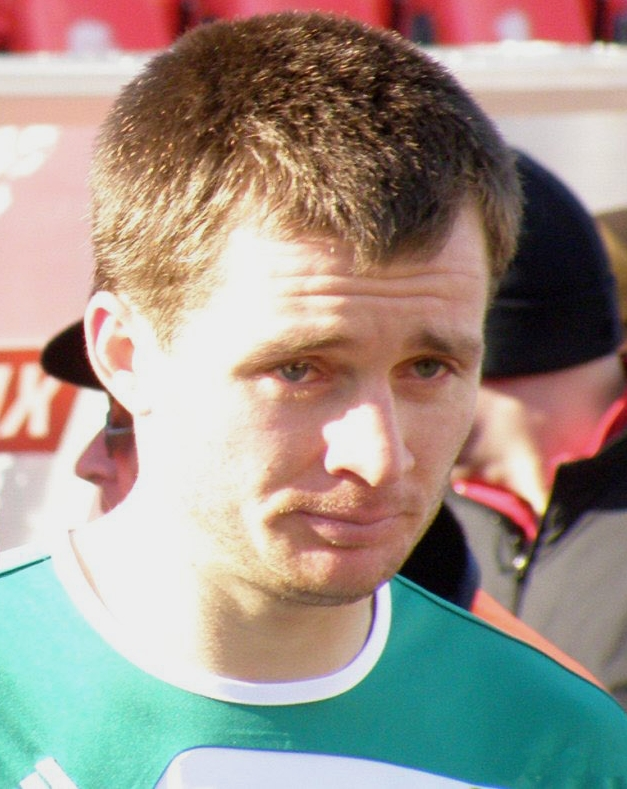

Personal information
- Full name: David Taymurazovich Tsorayev
- Date of birth: 7 May 1983 (age 43)
- Place of birth: Ordzhonikidze, now Vladikavkaz, Russian SFSR
- Height: 1.74 m (5 ft 8 1/2 in)
- Position: Midfielder

Senior career*
Years	Team	Apps	(Gls)
2000–2003	FC Avtodor Vladikavkaz	82	(7)
2004–2007	FC KAMAZ Naberezhnye Chelny	93	(1)
2008–2010	FC Anzhi Makhachkala	90	(15)
2011–2013	FC Kuban Krasnodar	51	(3)
2014	FC SKA-Energiya Khabarovsk	7	(1)
2014	FC Alania Vladikavkaz	10	(0)
- * Club domestic league appearances and goals as of 27 February 2015

David Taymurazovich Tsorayev (Russian: Давид Таймуразович Цораев; born 7 May 1983) is a Russian former professional footballer.

He made his professional debut in the Russian Second Division in 2000 for FC Avtodor Vladikavkaz.
