= Bogdan Karyukin =

Russian footballer

Personal information
- Full name: Bogdan Vladimirovich Karyukin
- Date of birth: 20 August 1985 (age 41)
- Place of birth: Barnaul, Russian SFSR
- Height: 1.84 m (6 ft 0 in)
- Position: Goalkeeper

Team information
- Current team: FC Dynamo Barnaul (GK coach)

Senior career*
Years	Team	Apps	(Gls)
2002–2008	FC Metallurg-Kuzbass Novokuznetsk	92	(0)
2003–2004	→ FC Shakhtyor Prokopyevsk (loan)	32	(0)
2005	→ FC Kuzbass-Dynamo Kemerovo (loan)	29	(0)
2009–2014	FC Kuban Krasnodar	11	(0)
2015–2023	FC Dynamo Barnaul	173	(0)

Managerial career
- 2024–: FC Dynamo Barnaul (GK coach)
- * Club domestic league appearances and goals

Bogdan Vladimirovich Karyukin (Russian: Богдан Владимирович Карюкин; born 20 August 1985) is a Russian football coach and a former player who is a goalkeepers' coach with FC Dynamo Barnaul.

== Club career ==
He made his debut in the Russian Premier League for FC Kuban Krasnodar on 14 March 2009 in a game against FC Rubin Kazan.
