= Roman Bugayev =

Russian professional football player

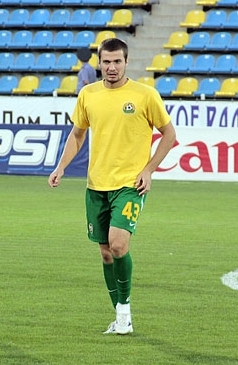

Personal information
- Full name: Roman Igorevich Bugayev
- Date of birth: 11 February 1989 (age 37)
- Place of birth: Bratsk, Irkutsk Oblast, Russian SFSR
- Height: 1.82 m (6 ft 0 in)
- Position: Left back

Youth career
- FC Torpedo Armavir
- FC Kuban Krasnodar

Senior career*
Years	Team	Apps	(Gls)
2007	FC Kuban Krasnodar	0	(0)
2009–2018	FC Kuban Krasnodar	176	(3)
2009	→ FC Torpedo Armavir (loan)	12	(0)
2018	FC Rotor Volgograd	16	(0)
2019	FC Tom Tomsk	11	(0)
2019–2020	FC Yenisey Krasnoyarsk	20	(1)
2020–2022	FC Kuban-Holding Pavlovskaya	53	(0)

International career
2011–2012	Russia-2	2	(0)
- * Club domestic league appearances and goals

Roman Igorevich Bugayev (Russian: Роман Игоревич Бугаев; born 11 February 1989) is a Russian former professional football player.

== Club career ==
He made his Russian Premier League debut for FC Kuban Krasnodar on 23 April 2011 in a game against FC Volga Nizhny Novgorod.
