= Vladislav Kulik =

Russian footballer

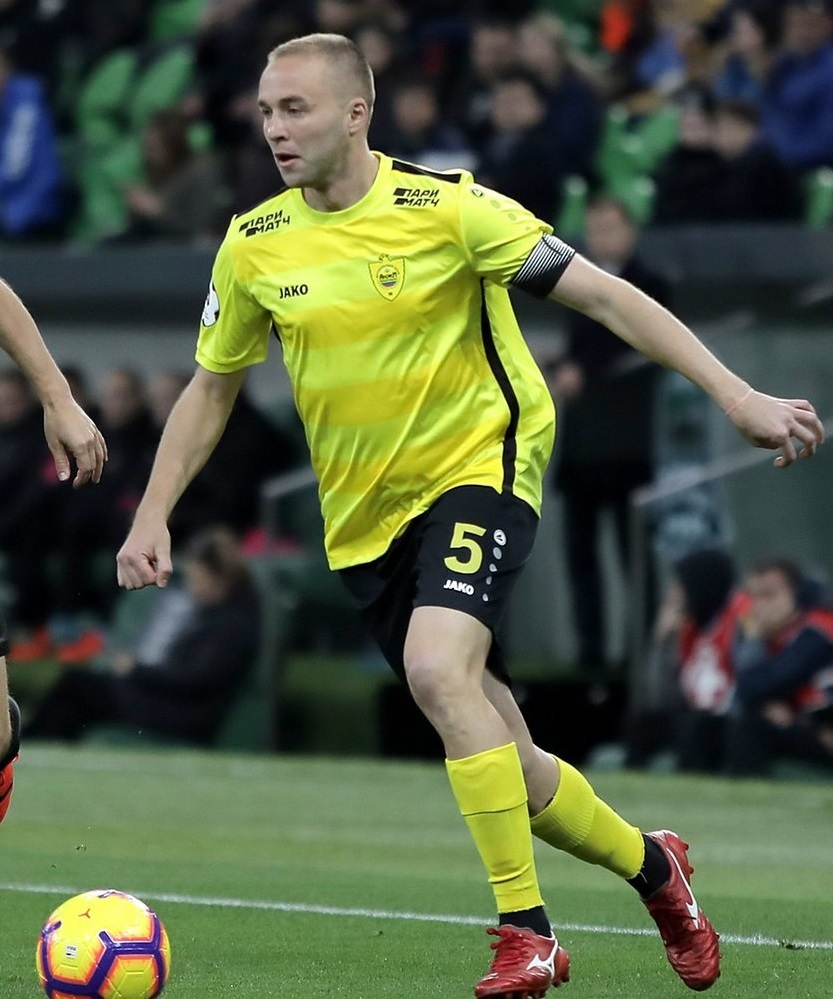
- Kulik with Anzhi Makhachkala in 2019

Personal information
- Full name: Vladislav Mikhailovich Kulik
- Date of birth: 27 February 1985 (age 41)
- Place of birth: Poltava, Ukrainian SSR
- Height: 1.80 m (5 ft 11 in)
- Position: Midfielder

Senior career*
Years	Team	Apps	(Gls)
2002	FC Lada Togliatti	3	(0)
2003	FC Rotor Volgograd	0	(0)
2004	FC Chernomorets Novorossiysk	33	(2)
2005	FC Ural Yekaterinburg	13	(1)
2006–2008	FC Terek Grozny	92	(12)
2009	FC Krylia Sovetov Samara	20	(0)
2010–2013	FC Kuban Krasnodar	73	(4)
2013–2017	FC Rubin Kazan	22	(0)
2014–2016	→ FC Kuban Krasnodar (loan)	41	(0)
2017	FC Orenburg	8	(2)
2018	FC Krylia Sovetov Samara	9	(0)
2018–2019	FC Anzhi Makhachkala	24	(3)
2019	FC Tambov	5	(0)
2020–2021	FC Chayka Peschanokopskoye	15	(4)

International career
2011–2012	Russia-2	2	(0)
- * Club domestic league appearances and goals

Vladislav Mikhailovich Kulik (Russian: Владислав Михайлович Кулик; born 27 February 1985) is a Russian former footballer who played as a central midfielder. Born and raised in Poltava, Ukraine, he decided to represent Russia on international level.

== Club career ==
On 2 July 2019, he signed a 1-year contract with Russian Premier League club FC Tambov. On 20 January 2020, he signed with Russian Football National League club FC Chayka Peschanokopskoye, where he reunited with Magomed Adiyev, who coached him at Anzhi several months earlier.

== Career statistics ==
As of 17 August 2018

Club	Season	League			Cup		Continental		Total	
Club	Season	Division	Apps	Goals	Apps	Goals	Apps	Goals	Apps	Goals
FC Lada Togliatti	2002	FNL	3	0	1	0	–		4	0
FC Rotor Volgograd	2003	Russian Premier League	0	0	1	0	–		1	0
FC Chernomorets Novorossiysk	2004	FNL	33	2	3	0	–		36	2
FC Ural Yekaterinburg	2005	FNL	13	1	1	1	–		14	2
FC Terek Grozny	2006	FNL	37	3	3	0	–		40	3
FC Terek Grozny	2007	FNL	35	7	3	2	–		38	9
FC Terek Grozny	2008	Russian Premier League	20	2	2	0	–		22	2
FC Terek Grozny	Total		92	12	8	2	0	0	100	14
FC Krylia Sovetov Samara	2008	Russian Premier League	20	2	2	0	2	0	24	2
FC Kuban Krasnodar	2010	FNL	16	2	0	0	–		16	2
FC Kuban Krasnodar	2011–12	Russian Premier League	31	2	0	0	–		31	2
FC Kuban Krasnodar	2012–13	Russian Premier League	26	0	1	0	–		27	0
FC Rubin Kazan	2013–14	Russian Premier League	22	0	1	0	9	0	32	0
FC Kuban Krasnodar	2014–15	Russian Premier League	25	0	4	0	–		29	0
FC Kuban Krasnodar	2015–16	Russian Premier League	16	0	0	0	–		16	0
FC Kuban Krasnodar	Total (2 spells)		114	4	5	0	0	0	119	4
FC Rubin Kazan	2016–17	Russian Premier League	0	0	0	0	–		0	0
FC Rubin Kazan	Total (2 spells)		22	0	1	0	9	0	32	0
FC Orenburg	2017–18	FNL	8	2	1	0	–		9	2
FC Krylia Sovetov Samara	2017–18	FNL	9	0	0	0	–		9	0
FC Krylia Sovetov Samara	Total (2 spells)		29	2	2	0	2	0	33	2
FC Anzhi Makhachkala	2018–19	Russian Premier League	3	0	–		–		3	0
Career total			317	23	23	3	11	0	351	26
