= Anton Rogochiy =

Russian footballer and coach

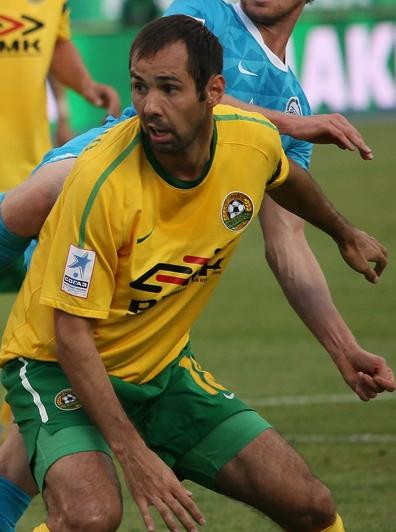
- Rogochiy with Kuban in 2011

Personal information
- Full name: Anton Nikolayevich Rogochiy
- Date of birth: 23 January 1982 (age 44)
- Place of birth: Rostov-on-Don, Russia, Soviet Union
- Height: 1.89 m (6 ft 2 in)
- Position: Centre-back

Team information
- Current team: Tekstilshchik Ivanovo (assistant coach)

Youth career
- Rostselmash Rostov-on-Don

Senior career*
| Years | Team | Apps | (Gls) |
| 1998–2008 | Rostov | 111 | (0) |
| 1998–2000 | → Rostselmash-2 | 29 | (3) |
| 2009 | Vityaz Podolsk | 26 | (1) |
| 2010 | Baltika Kaliningrad | 15 | (0) |
| 2010–2012 | Kuban Krasnodar | 27 | (0) |
| 2013 | Khimki | 8 | (0) |
| 2013 | Spartak Nalchik | 8 | (0) |
| 2014–2015 | Sibir Novosibirsk | 26 | (0) |
| 2016 | Chayka Peschanokopskoye | 6 | (1) |

International career
| 2001–2003 | Russia U-21 | 13 | (0) |

Managerial career
- 2017–2019: Rostov (academy)
- 2019–2020: Rostov (U19 assistant)
- 2021–2022: Rostov (academy)
- 2022–2024: Rostov (U19 assistant)
- 2024: Rostov-2 (assistant)
- 2024–: Tekstilshchik Ivanovo (assistant)
- * Club domestic league appearances and goals

Anton Nikolayevich Rogochiy (Russian: Антон Николаевич Рогочий; born 23 January 1982) is a Russian professional football coach and a former player. He is an assistant coach with Tekstilshchik Ivanovo.

== Playing career ==
He made his debut in the Russian Premier League in 1999 for Rostselmash Rostov-on-Don. He played 4 games in UEFA Intertoto Cup 1999 and UEFA Intertoto Cup 2000 for Rostselmash.

== Honours ==
- Russian Cup finalist: 2003.
