= Artur Tlisov =

Russian footballer

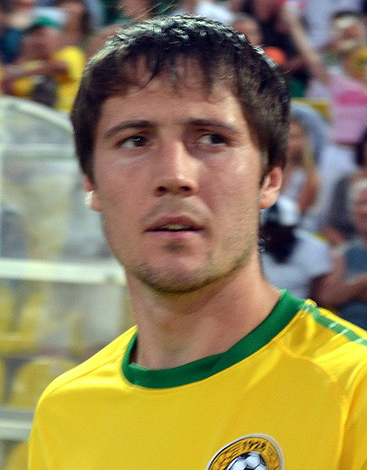

Personal information
- Full name: Artur Ruslanovich Tlisov
- Date of birth: 10 June 1982 (age 44)
- Place of birth: Cherkessk, Soviet Union (now Russia)
- Height: 1.78 m (5 ft 10 in)
- Position: Midfielder

Senior career*
Years	Team	Apps	(Gls)
1998	FC Nart Cherkessk	0	(0)
2000	FC Tsentr-R-Kavkaz Krasnodar		
2001	FC Chernomorets Novorossiysk	22	(1)
2002–2004	PFC CSKA Moscow	6	(1)
2004–2015	FC Kuban Krasnodar	334	(27)

International career
2002–2003	Russia U21	3	(0)
- * Club domestic league appearances and goals as of 3 July 2019

Artur Ruslanovich Tlisov (Russian: Артур Русланович Тлисов; born 10 June 1982) is a Russian former football player. He made his debut in the Russian Premier League in 2001 for FC Chernomorets Novorossiysk.

== Career statistics ==
As of 31 July 2014

Club	Div	Season	League		Cup		Europe		Total	
Club	Div	Season	Apps	Goals	Apps	Goals	Apps	Goals	Apps	Goals
(Russia) Chernomorets Novorossiysk	D1	2002	22	1	0	0	-		22	1
(Russia) Chernomorets Novorossiysk	Total		22	1	0	0	-		22	1
(Russia) CSKA Moscow	D1	2002	3	0	0	0	-		3	0
(Russia) CSKA Moscow	D1	2003	3	1	1	0	-		4	1
(Russia) CSKA Moscow	D1	2004	0	0	1	0	-		1	0
(Russia) CSKA Moscow	Total		6	1	2	0	-		8	1
(Russia) Kuban Krasnodar	D1	2004	14	2	2	0	-		16	2
(Russia) Kuban Krasnodar	D2	2005	40	3	2	0	-		42	3
(Russia) Kuban Krasnodar	D2	2006	39	5	0	0	-		39	5
(Russia) Kuban Krasnodar	D1	2007	29	3	2	1	-		31	4
(Russia) Kuban Krasnodar	D2	2008	41	7	2	0	-		43	7
(Russia) Kuban Krasnodar	D1	2009	27	4	1	0	-		28	4
(Russia) Kuban Krasnodar	D2	2010	36	1	0	0	-		36	1
(Russia) Kuban Krasnodar	D1	2011–12	38	0	2	0	-		40	0
(Russia) Kuban Krasnodar	D1	2012–13	24	1	3	0	-		27	1
(Russia) Kuban Krasnodar	D1	2013–14	20	0	0	0	6	0	26	0
(Russia) Kuban Krasnodar	D1	2014–15	0	0	0	0	-		0	0
(Russia) Kuban Krasnodar	Total		308	26	14	1	6	0	328	27
Career total			336	28	16	1	6	0	358	29

== Honours ==
- Russian Premier League champion: 2003.
