= Anton Sosnin =

Russian footballer

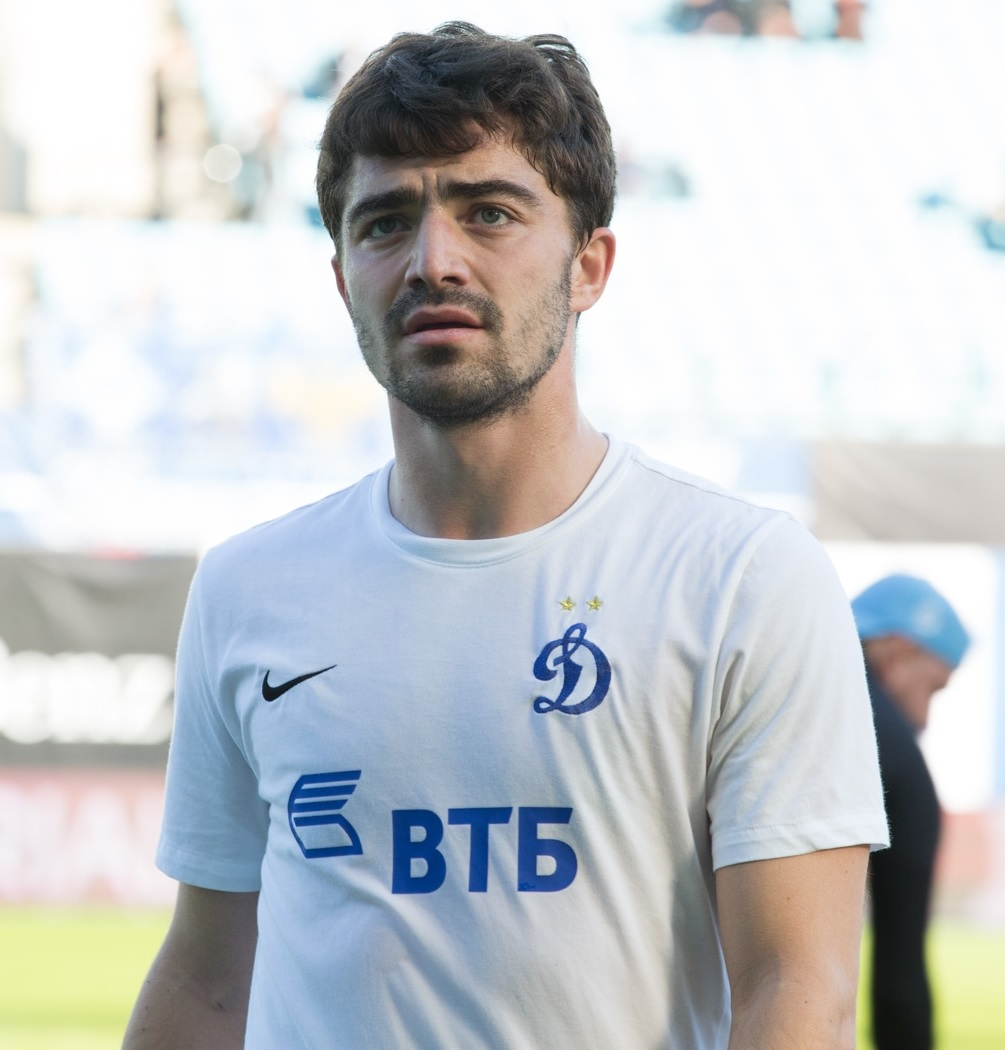
- Sosnin with Dynamo Moscow in 2016

Personal information
- Full name: Anton Vasilyevich Sosnin
- Date of birth: 27 January 1990 (age 36)
- Place of birth: Leningrad, Russian SFSR
- Height: 1.78 m (5 ft 10 in)
- Position: Midfielder

Team information
- Current team: Dynamo-2 Moscow (assistant coach)

Youth career
- DYuSSh Start St. Petersburg
- 2002–2006: DYuSSh Smena-Zenit
- 2006–2009: Zenit St. Petersburg

Senior career*
Years	Team	Apps	(Gls)
2009–2010	Zenit St. Petersburg	0	(0)
2010	→ Krylia Sovetov Samara (loan)	11	(0)
2011	Krylia Sovetov Samara	31	(0)
2012–2015	Kuban Krasnodar	49	(1)
2015–2020	Dynamo Moscow	78	(0)
2021	Neftekhimik Nizhnekamsk	0	(0)

International career
2007	Russia U-17	11	(3)
2008	Russia U-18	5	(2)
2009	Russia U-19	7	(1)
2010	Russia U-20	4	(1)
2009–2013	Russia U-21	18	(2)

Managerial career
- 2026–: Dynamo-2 Moscow (assistant)
- * Club domestic league appearances and goals

Anton Vasilyevich Sosnin (Russian: Антон Васильевич Соснин; born 27 January 1990) is a Russian professional football coach and a former central midfielder or left winger. He is an assistant coach with Dynamo-2 Moscow.

== Club career ==
He made his Russian Premier League debut for Krylia Sovetov Samara on 12 September 2010 in a game against Spartak Nalchik.

== Career statistics ==
Club	Season	League			Cup		Continental		Total	
Club	Season	Division	Apps	Goals	Apps	Goals	Apps	Goals	Apps	Goals
Zenit St. Petersburg	2009	Russian Premier League	0	0	0	0	0	0	0	0
Krylia Sovetov Samara (loan)	2010	Russian Premier League	11	0	–		–		11	0
Krylia Sovetov Samara	2011–12	Russian Premier League	31	0	1	0	–		32	0
Kuban Krasnodar	2011–12	Russian Premier League	4	0	–		–		4	0
Kuban Krasnodar	2012–13	Russian Premier League	2	0	2	0	–		4	0
Kuban Krasnodar	2013–14	Russian Premier League	19	0	1	0	6 (Note: Appearances in the UEFA Europa League)	0	26	0
Kuban Krasnodar	2014–15	Russian Premier League	24	1	4	0	–		28	1
Kuban Krasnodar	Total		49	1	7	0	6	0	62	1
Dynamo Moscow	2015–16	Russian Premier League	22	0	1	0	–		23	0
Dynamo Moscow	2016–17	Russian First League	18	0	0	0	–		18	0
Dynamo Moscow	2017–18	Russian Premier League	22	0	0	0	–		22	0
Dynamo Moscow	2018–19	Russian Premier League	12	0	2	0	–		14	0
Dynamo Moscow	2019–20	Russian Premier League	4	0	0	0	–		4	0
Dynamo Moscow	Total		78	0	3	0	0	0	81	0
Career total			169	1	11	0	6	0	186	1
