= 2015–16 FC Dynamo Moscow season =

Russian association football club season

Dynamo Moscow
2015–16 season
- Chairman: Vacant
- Manager: Andrey Kobelev
- Stadium: Arena Khimki
- Russian Premier League: 15th (relegated)
- Russian Cup: Quarter-finals v. Amkar Perm
- Top goalscorer: League: All: Aleksandr Kokorin (5)
- Highest home attendance: 13,500 v. Spartak Moscow; 25 October 2015
- Lowest home attendance: 3,327 v. Anzhi Makhachkala; 4 December 2015
- Average home league attendance: 5,956; 29 April 2016
Home colours	Away colours

The 2015–16 Dynamo Moscow season was the 93rd season in the club's history. They participated in the Russian Premier League and the Russian Cup, having been disqualified from Europa League for violating Financial Fair Play by not breaking even the previous season.

== Squad ==
Note: Flags indicate national team as defined under FIFA eligibility rules; some limited exceptions apply. Players may hold more than one non-FIFA nationality.

No.	Pos.	Nation	Player
1	GK	RUS	Anton Shunin
2	DF	RUS	Grigori Morozov
3	DF	SWE	Sebastian Holmén
4	DF	CGO	Christopher Samba
5	DF	RUS	Vitali Dyakov
7	MF	BLR	Stanislaw Drahun
8	FW	RUS	Pavel Pogrebnyak
11	MF	RUS	Aleksei Ionov
12	DF	RUS	Yegor Danilkin
13	MF	RUS	Maksim Kuzmin
15	DF	SVK	Tomáš Hubočan
17	DF	RUS	Dmitri Zhivoglyadov
21	FW	MNE	Fatos Bećiraj

No.	Pos.	Nation	Player
22	FW	RUS	Pavel Solomatin
23	DF	RUS	Anton Sosnin
25	DF	RUS	Aleksei Kozlov
27	MF	RUS	Igor Denisov (captain)
30	GK	RUS	Vladimir Gabulov
38	DF	RUS	Andrey Yeshchenko
47	MF	RUS	Roman Zobnin
72	DF	RUS	Aleksandr Kalyashin
77	MF	RUS	Anatoli Katrich
80	MF	RUS	Vladislav Lyovin
88	MF	RUS	Aleksandr Tashayev
90	FW	RUS	Nikolay Obolskiy
98	MF	RUS	Anton Terekhov

=== Out on loan ===
Note: Flags indicate national team as defined under FIFA eligibility rules; some limited exceptions apply. Players may hold more than one non-FIFA nationality.

No. / Pos. / Nation / Player; 3 / DF / NED / Alexander Büttner (at (Belgium) Anderlecht)	No. / Pos. / Nation / Player; 28 / DF / FIN / Boris Rotenburg (at (Russia) Rostov)

=== Reserve squad ===
Note: Flags indicate national team as defined under FIFA eligibility rules; some limited exceptions apply. Players may hold more than one non-FIFA nationality.

No.	Pos.	Nation	Player
41	GK	RUS	Igor Leshchuk
43	GK	RUS	Stanislav Cherchesov Jr.
51	DF	RUS	Roman Yevgenyev
52	DF	RUS	Ilya Panin
54	MF	RUS	Ilya Gomanyuk
55	FW	RUS	Kirill Burykin
56	MF	RUS	Viktor Demyanov
57	MF	RUS	Denis Sedykh
58	FW	RUS	Semyon Belyakov
60	DF	RUS	Artyom Gorbulin
61	DF	RUS	Semyon Matviychuk
62	DF	RUS	Nikita Kalugin
63	MF	RUS	Pavel Lelyukhin
64	DF	RUS	Aleksandr Shchegolkov
66	MF	RUS	Anton Antonov
67	MF	RUS	Pavel Farafonov
68	DF	RUS	Denis Sidnev
69	MF	RUS	Nikita Kireyev
70	DF	RUS	Maksim Nenakhov

No.	Pos.	Nation	Player
71	DF	RUS	Roman Denisov
73	DF	RUS	Sergei Yevtushenko
74	DF	RUS	Nikita Klimov
75	MF	RUS	Mikhail Mogulkin
76	MF	RUS	Osman Isayev
78	FW	RUS	Stanislav Latsevich
81	GK	RUS	Pyotr Kosarevsky
82	GK	RUS	David Sangare
83	GK	RUS	Andrei Rebrikov
84	GK	RUS	Ivan Zirikov
85	MF	RUS	Nikita Kanavin
86	MF	RUS	Vyacheslav Grulyov
87	MF	RUS	Valeri Saramutin
89	DF	RUS	Nikolai Mayorsky
91	DF	RUS	Aleksandr Stepanov
92	FW	RUS	Maksim Obolskiy
93	MF	RUS	Eduard Sholokh
96	DF	RUS	Aleksandr Zakharov
97	MF	RUS	Anton Altunin

== Transfers ==
=== Summer ===
In: Note: Flags indicate national team as defined under FIFA eligibility rules; some limited exceptions apply. Players may hold more than one non-FIFA nationality.

No.	Pos.	Nation	Player
8	FW	RUS	Pavel Pogrebnyak (from (England) Reading)
20	DF	RUS	Vitali Dyakov (from (Russia) Rostov)
22	FW	RUS	Pavel Solomatin (end of loan to (Russia) Amkar Perm)
23	MF	RUS	Anton Sosnin (from (Russia) Kuban Krasnodar)
60	DF	RUS	Artyom Gorbulin
66	MF	RUS	Anton Antonov
70	DF	RUS	Maksim Nenakhov
71	DF	RUS	Roman Denisov
76	MF	RUS	Osman Isayev
78	FW	RUS	Stanislav Latsevich
81	GK	RUS	Pyotr Kosarevsky
86	MF	RUS	Vyacheslav Grulyov
93	MF	RUS	Eduard Sholokh
96	DF	RUS	Aleksandr Zakharov

Out: Note: Flags indicate national team as defined under FIFA eligibility rules; some limited exceptions apply. Players may hold more than one non-FIFA nationality.

No.	Pos.	Nation	Player
5	DF	NED	Douglas (to (Turkey) Trabzonspor)
6	MF	FRA	William Vainqueur (to (Italy) Roma)
7	MF	HUN	Balázs Dzsudzsák (to (Turkey) Bursaspor)
8	MF	RUS	Artur Yusupov (to (Russia) Zenit Saint Petersburg)
14	MF	FRA	Mathieu Valbuena (to (France) Olympique Lyonnais)
21	GK	ARM	Roman Berezovsky (retired)
22	FW	GER	Kevin Kurányi (to (Germany) TSG 1899 Hoffenheim)
28	DF	FIN	Boris Rotenberg (on loan to (Russia) Rostov)
34	MF	RUS	Artyom Katashevsky (to (Russia) Dynamo Saint Petersburg)
45	DF	RUS	Artyom Yarmolitsky (to (Russia) Tom Tomsk)
71	MF	RUS	Igor Gorbunov (to (Russia) Dynamo Saint Petersburg)
76	DF	RUS	Anton Ivanov (to (Russia) Dynamo Saint Petersburg)
86	MF	RUS	Artyom Malakhov (to (Russia) Dynamo Saint Petersburg)
—	GK	RUS	Yevgeni Frolov (to (Russia) Kuban Krasnodar, previously on loan at (Russia) Sakhalin Yuzhno-Sakhalinsk)
—	GK	RUS	Yegor Generalov (to (Russia) Dynamo Saint Petersburg, previously on loan to (Russia) Saturn Ramenskoye)
—	DF	RUS	Vladimir Granat (to (Russia) Spartak Moscow, previously on loan at (Russia) FC Rostov)
—	DF	CRO	Gordon Schildenfeld (to (Croatia) Dinamo Zagreb, previously on loan at (Greece) Panathinaikos)
—	MF	RUS	Aleksandr Ilyin (to (Russia) Dynamo Saint Petersburg, previously on loan to (Russia) Sakhalin Yuzhno-Sakhalinsk)
—	FW	RUS	Andrei Panyukov (to (Lithuania) Atlantas Klaipėda, previously on loan)
—	FW	RUS	Fyodor Smolov (to (Russia) FC Krasnodar, previously on loan at (Russia) Ural Sverdlovsk Oblast)

=== Winter ===
In: Note: Flags indicate national team as defined under FIFA eligibility rules; some limited exceptions apply. Players may hold more than one non-FIFA nationality.

No.	Pos.	Nation	Player
3	DF	SWE	Sebastian Holmén (from (Sweden) IF Elfsborg)
7	MF	BLR	Stanislaw Drahun (from (Russia) Krylia Sovetov Samara)
21	FW	MNE	Fatos Bećiraj (from (Belarus) Dinamo Minsk)
38	DF	RUS	Andrey Yeshchenko (on loan from (Russia) Anzhi Makhachkala)
51	DF	RUS	Roman Yevgenyev
52	DF	RUS	Ilya Panin
54	MF	RUS	Ilya Gomanyuk
55	FW	RUS	Kirill Burykin
56	MF	RUS	Viktor Demyanov
57	MF	RUS	Denis Sedykh
58	FW	RUS	Semyon Belyakov
82	GK	RUS	David Sangare

Out: Note: Flags indicate national team as defined under FIFA eligibility rules; some limited exceptions apply. Players may hold more than one non-FIFA nationality.

No.	Pos.	Nation	Player
3	DF	NED	Alexander Büttner (on loan to (Belgium) Anderlecht)
9	FW	RUS	Aleksandr Kokorin (to (Russia) Zenit St. Petersburg)
18	MF	RUS	Yuri Zhirkov (to (Russia) Zenit St. Petersburg)
33	DF	RUS	Andrius Rukas
65	MF	RUS	Daniil Yamshchikov
79	MF	RUS	Aleksandr Morgunov
82	MF	RUS	Guram Adzhoyev (to (Russia) Arsenal Tula)
99	FW	RUS	Aleksandr Maksimenko (on loan to (Russia) Avangard Kursk)

== Competitions ==
=== Russian Premier League ===
==== Results by round ====
Round	1	2	3	4	5	6	7	8	9	10	11	12	13	14	15	16	17	18	19	20	21	22	23	24	25	26	27	28	29	30
Ground	A	H	A	A	H	A	H	A	H	A	H	A	H	A	H	A	H	H	A	H	A	H	A	H	A	H	A	H	A	H
Result	L	D	D	W	W	D	W	L	D	D	L	D	L	L	W	D	D	L	D	L	W	L	L	L	L	D	L	L	L	L
Position	11	12	12	7	7	7	6	8	7	8	10	10	10	11	9	10	10	11	11	11	11	11	11	12	12	12	12	12	14	15

Updated to match(es) played on 21 May 2016. Source: Russian Premier League
A = Away; H = Home; W = Win; D = Draw; L = Loss

==== Matches ====
19 July 2015 1	Zenit St. Petersburg	2–1	Dynamo Moscow	Saint Petersburg
13:30 MSK (UTC+3)	Neto (yellow card) 20'; Shatov (yellow card) 38', (goal) 67'; Hulk 44' (pen.)	Summary	Hubočan (yellow card) 15' (yellow-red card) 42'; Kokorin 28'; Obolsky (yellow card) 89'	Stadium: Petrovsky Stadium; Attendance: 16,577; Referee: Vitali Meshkov

25 July 2015 2	Dynamo Moscow	2–2	Mordovia Saransk	Khimki
18:30 MSK (UTC+3)	Ionov 12'; Valbuena 28' (pen.); Vainqueur (yellow card) 74'; Danilkin (yellow card) 81'	Summary	Lutsenko 24'; Nakhushev (yellow card) 27'; Shitov (yellow card) 62'; Mukhametshin (yellow card) 70'; Donald 82' (pen.)	Stadium: Arena Khimki; Attendance: 5,596; Referee: Kirill Levnikov

2 August 2015 3	Lokomotiv Moscow	1–1	Dynamo Moscow	Moscow
13:30 MSK (UTC+3)	Ćorluka 61'; Kasaev (yellow card) 80'	Summary	Morozov 45'; Valbuena (yellow card) 81'; Gabulov (yellow card) 90+4'	Stadium: Lokomotiv Stadium; Attendance: 12,410; Referee: Sergei Karasev

8 August 2015 4	Anzhi Makhachkala	2–3	Dynamo Moscow	Kaspiysk
19:30 MSK (UTC+3)	Maksimov 5', (yellow card) 56'; Boli 35' (pen.); Zhirov (yellow card) 37'; Moutari (yellow card) 43'; Ebecilio (yellow card) 44'; Gadzhibekov (red card) 78'; Eshchenko (yellow card) 90+2'	Summary	Kozlov 19'; Morozov (yellow card) 25'; Hubočan 45+1'; Valbuena 79' (pen.)	Stadium: Anzhi-Arena; Attendance: 15,000; Referee: Vladislav Bezborodov

16 August 2015 5	Dynamo Moscow	1–0	Ural	Khimki
17:00 MSK (UTC+3)	Morozov 60'; Gabulov (yellow card) 86'	Summary	Yemelyanov (yellow card) 24'; Erokhin (yellow card) 45+2'	Stadium: Arena Khimki; Attendance: 5,241; Referee: S. Ivanov

21 August 2015 6	Terek Grozny	1–1	Dynamo Moscow	Grozny
20:00 MSK (UTC+3)	Adílson (yellow card) 68'; Maurício 69', (yellow card) 85'; Utsiev (yellow card) 90+3'	Summary	Kokorin 41', (red card) 48'	Stadium: Akhmat-Arena; Attendance: 17,740; Referee: Igor Nizovtsev

29 August 2015 7	Dynamo Moscow	2–0	Ufa	Khimki
14:00 MSK (UTC+3)	Kozlov 45+1'; Dyakov 58' (pen.)	Summary	Osipov (yellow card) 57'	Stadium: Arena Khimki; Attendance: 5,134; Referee: S. Kulikov

13 September 2015 8	Krasnodar	4–0	Dynamo Moscow	Krasnodar
16:30 MSK (UTC+3)	Laborde 10'; Gazinsky (yellow card) 33'; Smolov (yellow card) 38'; Mamayev 41', 90+2'; Akhmedov 71'	Summary	Pogrebnyak (yellow card) 74'	Stadium: Kuban Stadium; Attendance: 9,465; Referee: Sergey Lapochkin

21 September 2015 9	Dynamo Moscow	0–0	Rubin Kazan	Khimki
19:00 MSK (UTC+3)	Kokorin (yellow card) 28'	Summary	Kvirkvelia (yellow card) 23'; Kislyak (yellow card) 44'	Stadium: Arena Khimki; Attendance: 5,272; Referee: Vladimir Moskalev

27 September 2015 10	Krylia Sovetov	0–0	Dynamo Moscow	Samara
13:30 MSK (UTC+3)	Gorbatenko (yellow card) 30'; Mollo (yellow card) 45' (yellow-red card) 83'	Summary	Kozlov (yellow card) 69'	Stadium: Metallurg Stadium; Attendance: 15,527; Referee: S. Kostevich

4 October 2015 11	Dynamo Moscow	0–2	CSKA Moscow	Khimki
13:30 MSK (UTC+3)	Zobnin (yellow card) 35'	Summary	Wernbloom 47'; Tošić (yellow card) 65'; Dzagoev (yellow card) 69'; Musa 77'	Stadium: Arena Khimki; Attendance: 13,329; Referee: A. Nikolayev

17 October 2015 12	Amkar Perm	1–1	Dynamo Moscow	Perm
16:30 MSK (UTC+3)	Cherenchikov (yellow card) 32'; Ogude (yellow card) 39'; Dzhikiya (yellow card) 52'; Prudnikov 83'	Summary	Zhivoglyadov (yellow card) 57'; Kokorin 90' (pen.)	Stadium: Zvezda Stadium; Attendance: 5,340; Referee: Kirill Levnikov

25 October 2015 13	Dynamo Moscow	2–3	Spartak Moscow	Khimki
14:30 MSK (UTC+3)	Kokorin 17'; Pogrebnyak 67'; Zhirkov (yellow card) 77'; Denisov (yellow card) 87'	Summary	Tasci (yellow card) 7'; Promes 22', 90+1'; Parshivlyuk (yellow card) 34'; Bocchetti (yellow card) 52'; Davydov 70'; Glushakov (yellow card) 85'	Stadium: Arena Khimki; Attendance: 13,500; Referee: Vitali Meshkov

2 November 2015 14	Rostov	1–0	Dynamo Moscow	Rostov-on-Don
19:30 MSK (UTC+3)	Kalachev (yellow card) 34' (yellow-red card) 61'; Bastos 55'; Dzhanayev (yellow card) 86'	Summary	Dyakov (yellow card) 6'; Ionov (yellow card) 90+1'	Stadium: Olimp-2; Attendance: 13,313; Referee: Igor Nizovtsev

7 November 2015 15	Dynamo Moscow	2–1	Kuban Krasnodar	Khimki
18:30 MSK (UTC+3)	Hubočan (yellow card) 45+2'; Kozlov 74'; Zobnin 80'; Pogrebnyak (yellow card) 82'; Tashayev (yellow card) 88'	Report	Ignatyev 45+2'; Rabiu (yellow card) 75'; Xandão (yellow card) 82'	Stadium: Arena Khimki; Attendance: 3,623; Referee: S. Kulikov

22 November 2015 16	Mordovia Saransk	1–1	Dynamo Moscow	Saransk
14:30 MSK (UTC+3)	Phibel (yellow card) 55'; Le Tallec 75'; Sysueyev (yellow card) 89'	Report	Tashayev 35'; Pogrebnyak (yellow card) 38'; Ionov (yellow card) 82'; Sosnin (yellow card) 85'	Stadium: Start Stadium; Attendance: 5,437; Referee: Vladimir Moskalev

30 November 2015 17	Dynamo Moscow	2–2	Lokomotiv Moscow	Khimki
19:00 MSK (UTC+3)	Sosnin (yellow card) 13'; Dyakov 35' (pen.), 90+2'; Zhirkov (yellow card) 90+1'	Report	Guilherme (yellow card) 33'; Samedov 49'; Maicon 76'	Stadium: Arena Khimki; Attendance: 3,966; Referee: Aleksei Eskov

4 December 2015 18	Dynamo Moscow	1–2	Anzhi Makhachkala	Khimki
19:00 MSK (UTC+3)	Kozlov 18'; Sosnin (yellow card) 33' (yellow-red card) 84'; Dyakov (yellow card) 41'; Obolsky (yellow card) 90+3'	Report	Agalarov (yellow card) 33'; Ebecilio 53'; Maksimov 54'; Gadzhibekov (yellow card) 64'; Pomazan (yellow card) 90+4'	Stadium: Arena Khimki; Attendance: 3,327; Referee: Mikhail Vilkov

7 March 2016 19	Ural	1–1	Dynamo Moscow	Yekaterinburg
14:30 MSK (UTC+3)	Stavpets (yellow card) 45'; Acevedo 63', (yellow card) 74'; Dantsev (yellow card) 68'	Report	Ionov 59'; Yeshchenko (yellow card) 79'	Stadium: Central Stadium; Attendance: 3,946; Referee: Vladislav Bezborodov

14 March 2016 20	Dynamo Moscow	0–1	Terek Grozny	Khimki
20:00 MSK (UTC+3)	Hubočan (yellow card) 80'	Report	Mitrishev 68', (yellow card) 80'; Ivanov (yellow card) 83'	Stadium: Arena Khimki; Attendance: 3,367; Referee: Sergey Lapochkin

19 March 2016 21	Ufa	0–1	Dynamo Moscow	Ufa
15:30 MSK (UTC+3)	Diego (yellow card) 37'	Report	Bećiraj 29', (yellow card) 84'; Hubočan (yellow card) 48'	Stadium: Neftyanik Stadium; Attendance: 3,330; Referee: Mikhail Vilkov

4 April 2016 22	Dynamo Moscow	1–4	Krasnodar	Khimki
MSK (UTC+3)	Ionov 27' (pen.); Drahun (yellow card) 30'	Report	Mamayev 31' (pen.); Smolov (yellow card) 32', (goal) 69'; Podberyozkin 47'; Kaleshin (yellow card) 61'; Pereyra (yellow card) 73'; Ahmedov 82'	Stadium: Arena Khimki; Attendance: 3,863; Referee: S. Ivanov

9 April 2016 23	Rubin Kazan	4–1	Dynamo Moscow	Kazan
19:30 MSK (UTC+3)	Karadeniz 3'; Kanunnikov 14'; Portnyagin 30'; Dević 67' (pen.)	Report	Ionov 17' (pen.)	Stadium: Central Stadium; Attendance: 12,073; Referee: Kirill Levnikov

17 April 2016 24	Dynamo Moscow	0–1	Krylia Sovetov	Khimki
17:00 MSK (UTC+3)		Report	Bruno 90+4'	Stadium: Arena Khimki; Attendance: 4,332; Referee: Vladislav Bezborodov

24 April 2016 25	CSKA Moscow	1–0	Dynamo Moscow	Khimki
17:00 MSK (UTC+3)	Berezutski 56'; Eremenko (yellow card) 60'	Report	Denisov (yellow card) 19'; Zobnin (yellow card) 69'; Yeshchenko (red card) 90+2'	Stadium: Arena Khimki; Attendance: 11,000; Referee: Aleksei Eskov

29 April 2016 26	Dynamo Moscow	0–0	Amkar Perm	Khimki
19:00 MSK (UTC+3)	Morozov (yellow card) 58'	Report	Ogude (yellow card) 79'; Gigolayev (yellow card) 83'	Stadium: Arena Khimki; Attendance: 6,872; Referee: Mikhail Vilkov

8 May 2016 27	Spartak Moscow	3–0	Dynamo Moscow	Moscow
19:30 MSK (UTC+3)	Promes 44', 86'; Bocchetti (yellow card) 49'; Luís 55'; Glushakov (yellow card) 74'	Report	Eshchenko (yellow card) 30'	Stadium: Otkrytie Arena; Attendance: 26,508; Referee: Sergey Karasev

12 May 2016 28	Dynamo Moscow	1–3	Rostov	Khimki
19:30 MSK (UTC+3)	Bećiraj 17'	Report	Rotenberg (yellow card) 37'; Azmoun 40', 50'; Kudryashov 64'; Kalachou (yellow card) 69'	Stadium: Arena Khimki; Attendance: 5,192; Referee: Aleksandr Egorov

16 May 2016 29	Kuban Krasnodar	1–0	Dynamo Moscow	Krasnodar
19:30 MSK (UTC+3)	Pavlyuchenko 21'; Khubulov (yellow card) 45+1'	Report	Drahun (yellow card) 17'; Sosnin (yellow card) 41'; Zobnin (yellow card) 51'; Yeshchenko (yellow card) 60'; Kozlov (red card) 90+5'	Stadium: Kuban Stadium; Attendance: 14,217; Referee: Vladislav Bezborodov

20 May 2016 30	Dynamo Moscow	0–3	Zenit St. Petersburg	Khimki
13:30 MSK (UTC+3)	Zhivoglyadov (yellow card) 41'; Gabulov (yellow card) 83'; Solomatin (yellow card) 90+1'	Report	Dzyuba 59'; Kokorin 62' (yellow card) 67'; Criscito (yellow card) 86' (goal) 90+2' (pen.)	Stadium: Arena Khimki; Attendance: 12,407; Referee: Sergey Ivanov

==== League table ====
Pos	Team	Pld	W	D	L	GF	GA	GD	Pts	Qualification or relegation
12	Ufa	30	6	9	15	25	44	−19	27	
13	Anzhi Makhachkala (O)	30	6	8	16	28	50	−22	26	Qualification for the Relegation play-offs
14	Kuban Krasnodar (R)	30	5	11	14	34	44	−10	26	Qualification for the Relegation play-offs
15	Dynamo Moscow (R)	30	5	10	15	25	47	−22	25	Relegation to Football National League
16	Mordovia Saransk (R)	30	4	12	14	30	50	−20	24	Relegation to Football National League

Source: Russian Premier League, Soccerway
Rules for classification: 1) Points; 2) Matches won; 3) Head-to-head points; 4) Head-to-head matches won; 5) Head-to-head goal difference; 6) Head-to-head goals scored; 7) Head-to-head away goals; 8) Goal difference; 9) Goals scored; 10) Away goals scored.
(O) Play-off winners; (R) Relegated

=== Russian Cup ===
24 September 2015 Round of 32	Lokomotiv Liski	0–2	Dynamo Moscow	Liski
18:00 MSK (UTC+3)	Murtazov (yellow card) 26'; Igor Fateyev (yellow card) 86'	Summary	Tashaev 35'; Ionov (yellow card) 37'; Kokorin 50'	Stadium: Lokomotiv Stadium; Attendance: 10,000; Referee: Aleksei Sukhoi

29 October 2015 Round of 16	Krylia Sovetov	0–1	Dynamo Moscow	Samara
18:00 MSK (UTC+3)	Gabulov (yellow card) 42'; Jahović (yellow card) 72' (yellow-red card) 75'	Summary	Tashayev 87'	Stadium: Metallurg Stadium; Attendance: 4,951; Referee: Aleksandr Yegorov

2 March 2016 Quarter-finals	Amkar Perm	3–1	Dynamo Moscow	Perm
15:00 MSK (UTC+3)	Gol (yellow card) 20'; Prudnikov 26'; Zaytsev 41'; Shavayev 90+3' (pen.)	Summary	Kozlov (yellow card) 64'; Drahun 87'; Hubočan (yellow card) 90+3'	Stadium: Zvezda Stadium; Attendance: 7,300; Referee: Vladimir Moskalev

== Squad statistics ==
As of match played 21 May 2016

=== Appearances and goals ===
No.	Pos	Nat	Player	Total		Premier League		Russian Cup	
No.	Pos	Nat	Player	Apps	Goals	Apps	Goals	Apps	Goals
1	GK	(Russia) RUS	Anton Shunin	8	0	7	0	1	0
2	DF	(Russia) RUS	Grigori Morozov	23	2	20+1	2	1+1	0
3	DF	(Sweden) SWE	Sebastian Holmén	10	0	9+1	0	0	0
4	DF	(Republic of the Congo) CGO	Christopher Samba	4	0	3+1	0	0	0
5	DF	(Russia) RUS	Vitali Dyakov	23	3	19+1	3	3	0
7	MF	(Belarus) BLR	Stanislaw Drahun	10	1	8+1	0	1	1
8	FW	(Russia) RUS	Pavel Pogrebnyak	19	1	14+2	1	3	0
11	MF	(Russia) RUS	Aleksei Ionov	32	4	28+1	4	3	0
12	DF	(Russia) RUS	Yegor Danilkin	2	0	2	0	0	0
13	MF	(Russia) RUS	Maksim Kuzmin	6	0	1+5	0	0	0
15	DF	(Slovakia) SVK	Tomáš Hubočan	24	1	22	1	2	0
17	MF	(Russia) RUS	Dmitri Zhivoglyadov	23	0	11+10	0	1+1	0
21	FW	(Montenegro) MNE	Fatos Bećiraj	13	2	12	2	0+1	0
22	FW	(Russia) RUS	Pavel Solomatin	2	0	0+2	0	0	0
23	MF	(Russia) RUS	Anton Sosnin	23	0	18+4	0	1	0
25	DF	(Russia) RUS	Aleksei Kozlov	24	4	21+1	4	2	0
27	MF	(Russia) RUS	Igor Denisov	25	0	22+1	0	2	0
30	GK	(Russia) RUS	Vladimir Gabulov	25	0	23	0	2	0
38	DF	(Russia) RUS	Andrey Yeshchenko	10	0	9	0	1	0
47	MF	(Russia) RUS	Roman Zobnin	32	1	25+4	1	3	0
72	DF	(Russia) RUS	Aleksandr Kalyashin	1	0	0+1	0	0	0
77	MF	(Russia) RUS	Anatoli Katrich	7	0	4+2	0	0+1	0
80	MF	(Russia) RUS	Vladislav Lyovin	4	0	1+2	0	0+1	0
87	MF	(Russia) RUS	Valeri Saramutin	1	0	0+1	0	0	0
88	MF	(Russia) RUS	Aleksandr Tashayev	27	3	20+4	1	3	2
90	FW	(Russia) RUS	Nikolai Obolsky	8	0	0+7	0	0+1	0
98	MF	(Russia) RUS	Anton Terekhov	4	0	1+3	0	0	0
Players away from the club on loan:
3	DF	(Netherlands) NED	Alexander Büttner	1	0	0+1	0	0	0
Players who appeared for Dynamo Moscow but left during the season:
5	DF	(Netherlands) NED	Douglas	2	0	0+2	0	0	0
6	MF	(France) FRA	William Vainqueur	1	0	0+1	0	0	0
7	MF	(Hungary) HUN	Balázs Dzsudzsák	1	0	1	0	0	0
9	FW	(Russia) RUS	Aleksandr Kokorin	10	5	8	4	2	1
14	FW	(France) FRA	Mathieu Valbuena	4	2	4	2	0	0
18	MF	(Russia) RUS	Yuri Zhirkov	18	0	16	0	2	0

=== Goal scorers ===
Place	Position	Nation	Number	Name	Russian Premier League	Russian Cup	Total
1	FW	(Russia)	9	Aleksandr Kokorin	4	1	5
2	MF	(Russia)	11	Aleksei Ionov	4	0	4
2	DF	(Russia)	25	Aleksei Kozlov	4	0	4
4	DF	(Russia)	5	Vitali Dyakov	3	0	3
4	MF	(Russia)	88	Aleksandr Tashayev	1	2	3
6	DF	(Russia)	2	Grigori Morozov	2	0	2
6	MF	(France)	14	Mathieu Valbuena	2	0	2
6	FW	(Montenegro)	21	Fatos Bećiraj	2	0	2
9	FW	(Russia)	8	Pavel Pogrebnyak	1	0	1
9	DF	(Slovakia)	15	Tomáš Hubočan	1	0	1
9	MF	(Russia)	47	Roman Zobnin	1	0	1
9	MF	(Belarus)	7	Stanislaw Drahun	0	1	1
				TOTALS	25	4	29

=== Disciplinary record ===
Number	Nation	Position	Name	Russian Premier League		Russian Cup		Total	
Number	Nation	Position	Name	Yellow card	Red card	Yellow card	Red card	Yellow card	Red card
2	(Russia)	DF	Grigori Morozov	2	0	0	0	2	0
5	(Russia)	DF	Vitali Dyakov	2	0	0	0	2	0
7	(Belarus)	MF	Stanislaw Drahun	2	0	0	0	2	0
8	(Russia)	FW	Pavel Pogrebnyak	3	0	0	0	3	0
9	(Russia)	FW	Alexandr Kokorin	1	1	0	0	1	1
11	(Russia)	MF	Aleksei Ionov	2	0	1	0	3	0
12	(Russia)	DF	Yegor Danilkin	1	0	0	0	1	0
15	(Slovakia)	DF	Tomáš Hubočan	4	1	1	0	5	1
17	(Russia)	DF	Dmitri Zhivoglyadov	2	0	0	0	2	0
18	(Russia)	MF	Yuri Zhirkov	2	0	0	0	2	0
21	(Montenegro)	FW	Fatos Bećiraj	1	0	0	0	1	0
22	(Russia)	FW	Pavel Solomatin	1	0	0	0	1	0
23	(Russia)	MF	Anton Sosnin	4	1	0	0	4	1
25	(Russia)	DF	Aleksei Kozlov	1	1	1	0	2	1
27	(Russia)	MF	Igor Denisov	2	0	0	0	2	0
30	(Russia)	GK	Vladimir Gabulov	3	0	0	0	3	0
38	(Russia)	DF	Andrey Yeshchenko	3	1	0	0	3	1
47	(Russia)	MF	Roman Zobnin	3	0	0	0	3	0
88	(Russia)	MF	Aleksandr Tashayev	1	0	0	0	1	0
90	(Russia)	FW	Nikolai Obolsky	2	0	0	0	2	0
			TOTALS	42	5	3	0	45	5
