= 2013–14 FC Kuban Krasnodar season =

Kuban Krasnodar
2013–14 season
- Chairman: Aleksandr Tkachyov
- Manager: Igor Osinkin until 31 July 2013; Dorinel Munteanu; 31 July – 12 October 2013; Viktor Goncharenko from 12 October 2013
- Stadium: Kuban Stadium
- Russian Premier League: 8th
- Russian Cup: Fifth round Zvezda Ryazan
- Europa League: Group stages
- Top goalscorer: League: Ibrahima Baldé (7); All: Lorenzo Melgarejo (10)
- Highest home attendance: 32,275 vs Feyenoord; 22 August 2013
- Lowest home attendance: 6,812 vs Lokomotiv Moscow; 2 December 2013
- Average home league attendance: 17,108; 8 May 2014
Home colours	Away colours

The 2013–14 FC Kuban Krasnodar season was the third successive season that the club played in the Russian Premier League, the highest tier of football in Russia. They finished the season in 8th place and were knocked out at the fifth round of the Russian Cup by Zvezda Ryazan on penalties after a 2–2 draw.

Leonid Kuchuk left the club during the summer at the end of his contract and was replaced by Igor Osinkin in a caretaker capacity. Osinjkin left the club on 31 July, being replaced by Dorinel Munteanu, but Munteanu only lasted two and a half months before being sacked and replaced by Viktor Goncharenko.

== Squad ==
Updated 8 March 2014, according to the club's official website. Note: Flags indicate national team as defined under FIFA eligibility rules; some limited exceptions apply. Players may hold more than one non-FIFA nationality.

No.	Pos.	Nation	Player
2	DF	MDA	Igor Armaș
4	DF	BRA	Xandão
5	DF	ESP	Ángel Dealbert
7	FW	CRC	Marco Ureña
8	MF	RUS	Artur Tlisov
9	MF	RUS	Arsen Khubulov
10	MF	BFA	Charles Kaboré
11	FW	ROU	Gheorghe Bucur
14	MF	RUS	Nikita Bezlikhotnov
15	DF	BLR	Maksim Zhavnerchik
18	MF	RUS	Vladislav Ignatyev
19	FW	RUS	Anton Sekret
20	FW	URU	Gonzalo Bueno

No.	Pos.	Nation	Player
21	MF	GHA	Mohammed Rabiu
22	MF	RUS	Anton Sosnin
23	GK	RUS	Aleksandr Belenov
25	DF	BUL	Stanislav Manolev
28	DF	PAR	Lorenzo Melgarejo
33	GK	RUS	Bogdan Karyukin
35	GK	MDA	Alexei Koşelev
43	DF	RUS	Roman Bugayev
71	MF	BUL	Ivelin Popov
77	DF	RUS	Vladimir Lobkaryov
81	MF	RUS	Temuri Bukiya
99	FW	SEN	Ibrahima Baldé

== Transfers ==
=== Summer ===
In: Note: Flags indicate national team as defined under FIFA eligibility rules; some limited exceptions apply. Players may hold more than one non-FIFA nationality.

No.	Pos.	Nation	Player
9	MF	RUS	Vladislav Ignatyev (from (Russia) FC Krasnodar)
13	FW	FRA	Djibril Cissé (from (England) Queens Park Rangers)
14	MF	RUS	Nikita Bezlikhotnov (from (Russia) Torpedo Moscow)
20	FW	URU	Gonzalo Bueno (from (Uruguay) Nacional)
21	MF	GHA	Mohammed Rabiu (from (France) Evian)
28	DF	PAR	Lorenzo Melgarejo (from (Portugal) Benfica)
90	MF	RUS	Arsen Khubulov (from (Russia) Alania Vladikavkaz)
—	MF	RUS	Igor Paderin (end of loan to (Russia) Tyumen)
—	MF	RUS	Anton Sekret (end of loan to (Belarus) Torpedo-BelAZ Zhodino)

Out: Note: Flags indicate national team as defined under FIFA eligibility rules; some limited exceptions apply. Players may hold more than one non-FIFA nationality.

No.	Pos.	Nation	Player
3	DF	NGR	Dele Adeleye (to (Russia) Anzhi Makhachkala)
7	MF	RUS	Vladislav Kulik (to (Russia) Rubin Kazan)
9	MF	RUS	Nikolai Zhilyayev (to (Russia) FC Ufa)
10	MF	RUS	Aleksei Ionov (to (Russia) Dynamo Moscow)
14	FW	NGR	Abdulwaheed Afolabi (to (Azerbaijan) Gabala)
14	MF	RUS	Nikita Bezlikhotnov (on loan to (Ukraine) Metalurh Donetsk)
20	FW	ROU	Daniel Niculae (to (Belgium) Gent)
24	MF	ARM	Aras Özbiliz (to (Russia) Spartak Moscow)
27	DF	CIV	Igor Lolo (to (Russia) Rostov)
30	MF	ARM	Marcos Pizzelli (to (Russia) FC Krasnodar)
31	DF	BRA	Leandro (end of loan from (Ukraine) Arsenal Kyiv)
32	MF	KAZ	Baurzhan Islamkhan (on loan to (Kazakhstan) Astana)
74	MF	RUS	Bunyamudin Mustafayev (to (Russia) Torpedo Armavir)
78	GK	RUS	Maksim Shvagirev (to (Russia) Torpedo Armavir)
80	MF	RUS	Ruslan Gomleshko (to (Russia) Torpedo Armavir)
81	FW	RUS	Kirill Romanets (to (Russia) Vityaz Krymsk)
89	GK	RUS	Dmitri Zaytsev (to (Russia) Torpedo Armavir)
91	FW	RUS	Yevgeni Kasyanov (to (Russia) Torpedo Armavir)
94	DF	RUS	Aleksandr Kaglyuk (to (Russia) Torpedo Armavir)
96	MF	RUS	Maksim Malysh (to (Russia) Torpedo Armavir)
—	DF	RUS	Sergei Bendz (released, previously on loan to (Russia) Tom Tomsk)
—	MF	RUS	Mikhail Komkov (on loan to (Russia) Tom Tomsk, previously on loan at (Russia) Khimki)

=== Winter ===
In: Note: Flags indicate national team as defined under FIFA eligibility rules; some limited exceptions apply. Players may hold more than one non-FIFA nationality.

No.	Pos.	Nation	Player
14	MF	RUS	Nikita Bezlikhotnov (loan return from (Ukraine) Metalurh Donetsk)
25	DF	BUL	Stanislav Manolev (from (Netherlands) PSV Eindhoven)

Out: Note: Flags indicate national team as defined under FIFA eligibility rules; some limited exceptions apply. Players may hold more than one non-FIFA nationality.

No.	Pos.	Nation	Player
6	MF	RUS	David Tsorayev (to (Russia) SKA-Energiya Khabarovsk)
13	FW	FRA	Djibril Cissé (to (France) Bastia)
17	MF	RUS	Artyom Fidler (to (Russia) Ural)
25	DF	RUS	Aleksei Anatolyevich Kozlov (to (Russia) Dynamo Moscow)

== Competitions ==
=== Russian Premier League ===
==== Matches ====
14 July 2013 1	Kuban Krasnodar	1–1	Rubin Kazan	Krasnodar
21:00 MSK (UTC+4)	Özbiliz 74'	Summary	Ryazantsev (red card) 45+1'; R.Eremenko 71'	Stadium: Kuban Stadium; Attendance: 19,943; Referee: Sergey Karasev

20 July 2013 2	Tom Tomsk	1–2	Kuban Krasnodar	Tomsk
16:00 MSK (UTC+4)	Panchenko 24'	Summary	Baldé 6'; Özbiliz 13'	Stadium: Trud Stadium; Attendance: 7,800; Referee: Aleksei Matyunin

26 July 2013 3	Zenit Saint Petersburg	1–1	Kuban Krasnodar	Saint Petersburg
20:00 MSK (UTC+4)	Arshavin 65'	Summary	Bucur 79'	Stadium: Petrovsky Stadium; Attendance: 20,500; Referee: Sergey Kuznetsov

4 August 2013 4	Kuban Krasnodar	2–2	Spartak Moscow	Krasnodar
20:30 MSK (UTC+4)	Baldé 67'; Xandão 70'	Summary	Emenike 30'; Movsisyan 75'	Stadium: Kuban Stadium; Attendance: 30,527; Referee: Vitali Meshkov

18 August 2013 5	CSKA Moscow	1–0	Kuban Krasnodar	Moscow
13:30 MSK (UTC+4)	Musa 11'	Summary		Stadium: Arena Khimki; Attendance: 9,000; Referee: Aleksey Eskov

25 August 2013 6	Kuban Krasnodar	3–2	Ural	Krasnodar
20:00 MSK (UTC+4)	Khubulov 8'; Cissé 27' (pen.), 43'	Summary	Yerokhin 13'; Acevedo 35' (pen.)	Stadium: Kuban Stadium; Attendance: 12,437; Referee: Maxim Layushkin

1 September 2013 7	Krylia Sovetov	0–0	Kuban Krasnodar	Samara
18:00 MSK (UTC+4)		Summary		Stadium: Metallurg Stadium; Attendance: 12,340; Referee: Vladimir Seldyakov

15 September 2013 8	Lokomotiv Moscow	1–0	Kuban Krasnodar	Moscow
13:30 MSK (UTC+4)	Tarasov 49'	Report		Stadium: Lokomotiv Stadium; Attendance: 9,475; Referee: Alexey Yeskov

22 September 2013 9	Kuban Krasnodar	0–3	Amkar Perm	Krasnodar
18:15 MSK (UTC+4)		Summary	Georgiev 8'; Jakubko 14'; Peev 16' (pen.)	Stadium: Kuban Stadium; Attendance: 15,282; Referee: Mikhail Vilkov

25 September 2013 10	Kuban Krasnodar	3–1	Terek Grozny	Krasnodar
20:00 MSK (UTC+4)	Bucur 6'; Baldé 44'; Xandão 66'	Summary	Maurício 2'	Stadium: Kuban Stadium; Attendance: 7,310; Referee: Vladislav Bezborodov

29 September 2013 11	Volga Nizhny Novgorod	1–0	Kuban Krasnodar	Nizhny Novgorod
15:45 MSK (UTC+4)	Kowalczyk 88'	Summary		Stadium: Lokomotiv Stadium; Attendance: 3,500; Referee: Igor Fedotov

6 October 2013 12	Kuban Krasnodar	2–2	FC Rostov	Krasnodar
20:15 MSK (UTC+4)	Baldé 48'; Cissé 72'	Summary	Dzyuba 19', 51'	Stadium: Kuban Stadium; Attendance: 8,321; Referee: Mikhail Vilkov

20 October 2013 13	Dynamo Moscow	3–1	Kuban Krasnodar	Moscow
18:00 MSK (UTC+4)	Voronin 58'; Granat 63'; Kurányi 83' (pen.)	Summary	Baldé 50'; Khubulov (red card) 68'; Tsorayev (red card) 86'	Stadium: Arena Khimki; Attendance: 4,000; Referee: Sergey Lapochkin

28 October 2013 14	Kuban Krasnodar	2–0	Anzhi Makhachkala	Krasnodar
19:00 MSK (UTC+4)	Bucur 14', 40'	Summary		Stadium: Kuban Stadium; Attendance: 12,540; Referee: Aleksandr Egorov

3 November 2013 15	FC Krasnodar	1–2	Kuban Krasnodar	Kuban Stadium
13:30 MSK (UTC+4)	Gohou 90+3'	Summary	Bucur 64'; Popov 90+1'	Stadium: Krasnodar; Attendance: 25,500; Referee: Vladislav Bezborodov

10 November 2013 16	Kuban Krasnodar	4–0	Volga Nizhny Novgorod	Kuban Stadium
20:15 MSK (UTC+4)	Baldé 12', 64'; Popov 26'; Ignatyev 40'	Summary		Stadium: Krasnodar; Attendance: 7,654; Referee: Sergey Ivanov

23 November 2013 17	Amkar Perm	3–1	Kuban Krasnodar	Perm
14:45 MSK (UTC+4)	Picușceac 77'; Cherenchikov 82'; Peev 86' (pen.)	Summary	Dealbert 27'	Stadium: Zvezda Stadium; Attendance: 9,200; Referee: Vitali Meshkov

2 December 2013 18	Kuban Krasnodar	1–3	Lokomotiv Moscow	Krasnodar
19:30 MSK (UTC+3)	Cissé 90+1'	Report	5' Maicon; 14' Ćorluka; 31' Boussoufa	Stadium: Kuban Stadium; Attendance: 6,812; Referee: Aleksandr Yegorov

7 December 2013 19	Anzhi Makhachkala	0–0	Kuban Krasnodar	Kaspiysk
16:00 MSK (UTC+4)		Summary	Bugayev (yellow card) 90+1' (yellow-red card) 90+2'; Kaboré (yellow card) 54' (yellow-red card) 90+3'	Stadium: Anzhi-Arena; Attendance: 4,400; Referee: Sergey Kuznetsov

10 March 2014 20	FC Rostov	0–0	Kuban Krasnodar	Rostov-on-Don
19:00 MSK (UTC+4)		Summary	Melgarejo (yellow card) 62' (yellow-red card) 90+3'	Stadium: Olimp – 2 Attendance: 13,100; Referee: Sergey Karasev

15 March 2014 21	Kuban Krasnodar	1–1	Dynamo Moscow	Krasnodar
18:30 MSK (UTC+4)	Popov 73'	Summary	Kurányi 43'	Stadium: Kuban Stadium; Attendance: 18,500; Referee: Vitali Meshkov

23 March 2014 22	Terek Grozny	2–1	Kuban Krasnodar	Grozny
18:30 MSK (UTC+4)	Aílton 33' (pen.); Komorowski 58'	Summary	Melgarejo 66'	Stadium: Terek Stadium; Attendance: 24,320; Referee: Alexey Nikolaev

30 March 2013 23	Kuban Krasnodar	1–3	FC Krasnodar	Krasnodar
20:15 MSK (UTC+4)	Melgarejo 14'	Summary	Shirokov 41', 79'; Ari 51'	Stadium: Kuban Stadium; Attendance: 15,742; Referee: Vyacheslav Kharlamov

4 April 2014 24	Kuban Krasnodar	2–0	Tom Tomsk	Krasnodar
18:15 MSK (UTC+4)	Armaș 67'; Popov 85'	Summary		Stadium: Kuban Stadium; Attendance: 8,117; Referee: Igor Fedotov

13 April 2014 25	Rubin Kazan	0–2	Kuban Krasnodar	Kazan
16:00 MSK (UTC+4)		Summary	Melgarejo 12'; Bucur 48'	Stadium: Central Stadium; Attendance: 3,349; Referee: Kirill Levnikov

20 April 2014 26	Kuban Krasnodar	0–4	CSKA Moscow	Krasnodar
18:30 MSK (UTC+4)	Bugayev (red card) 44'	Summary	Zuber 38'; Doumbia 45' (pen.); Bazelyuk 49'; Tošić 66'	Stadium: Kuban Stadium; Attendance: 14,120; Referee: Vitali Meshkov

28 April 2014 27	Spartak Moscow	0–2	Kuban Krasnodar	Moscow
20:30 MSK (UTC+4)		Summary	Popov 67', 86'	Stadium: Lokomotiv Stadium; Attendance: 8,585; Referee: Alexey Nikolaev

3 May 2014 28	Kuban Krasnodar	4–0	Krylia Sovetov	Krasnodar
19:00 MSK (UTC+4)	Manolev 48'; Melgarejo 49', 60'; Rabiu 79'	Summary		Stadium: Kuban Stadium; Attendance: 7,548; Referee: Mikhail Vilkov

10 May 2014 29	Ural	2–1	Kuban Krasnodar	Yekaterinburg
13:00 MSK (UTC+4)	Acevedo 27' (pen.); Dorozhkin 84'	Summary	Ignatyev 18'	Stadium: Central Stadium; Attendance: 14,420; Referee: Aleksey Eskov

15 May 2014 30	Kuban Krasnodar	1–4	Zenit St. Petersburg	Krasnodar
18:30 MSK (UTC+4)	Melgarejo 68'	Summary	Witsel 15'; Rondón 32'; Shatov 51'; Hulk 90+2'	Stadium: Kuban Stadium; Attendance: 22,429; Referee: Mikhail Vilkov

==== League table ====
Pos	Team	Pld	W	D	L	GF	GA	GD	Pts	Qualification or relegation
6	Spartak Moscow	30	15	5	10	46	36	+10	50 (Note: Krasnodar ahead of Spartak Moscow on head-to-head points; Krasnodar–Spartak Moscow 4–0, Spartak Moscow–Krasnodar 3–2.)	
7	Rostov	30	10	9	11	40	40	0	39	Qualification for the Europa League play-off round (Note: Rostov won the 2013–14 Russian Cup, therefore qualifying for the play-off round of the 2014–15 UEFA Europa League. However, it did not pass the Russian Football Union European licensing and thus its spot was given to Spartak. However, that RFU decision was then overturned by the CAS and Rostov was returned to the Europa League.)
8	Kuban Krasnodar	30	10	8	12	40	42	−2	38	
9	Rubin Kazan	30	9	11	10	36	30	+6	38 (Note: Rubin Kazan ahead of Amkar Perm on head-to-head points; Rubin Kazan–Amkar Perm 3–0, Amkar Perm–Rubin Kazan 0–0.)	
10	Amkar Perm	30	9	11	10	36	37	−1	38	

Source: Russian Premier League
Rules for classification: 1) points; 2) number of wins; 3) head-to-head points; 4) number of head-to-head wins; 5) head-to-head goal difference; 6) number of head-to-head goals scored; 7) number of head-to-head away goals scored; 8) goal difference; 9) number of goals scored; 10) number of away goals scored; 11) position in the 2012–13 season (only used until all the regularly scheduled games have been played); 11) extra play-off game or tournament between the teams in question.

=== Russian Cup ===
31 October 2013 Fifth Round	Zvezda Ryazan	2–2 (4–2 p)	Kuban Krasnodar	Ryazan
16:00 MSK (UTC+4)	Larionov 34'; Artyom Sivayev 84'	Summary	Melgarejo 62'; Khubulov 77' (pen.)	Stadium: CSK Stadium; Attendance: 5,700; Referee: Timur Arslanbekov
	Penalties
	Aleksandr Nartikov (penalty missed); Artyom Sivayev (penalty scored); Larionov (penalty scored); Mikhail Zhidkikh (penalty scored); Grushin (penalty scored)		Sosnin (penalty scored); Zhavnerchik (penalty missed); Bueno (penalty missed); Ureña (penalty scored)

=== Europa League ===
==== Qualifying rounds ====
1 August 2013 3rd qualifying round 1st leg	Motherwell (Scotland)	0–2	(Russia) Kuban Krasnodar	Motherwell
22:45 MSK (UTC+4)		Report	Popov 52', 78'	Stadium: Fir Park; Attendance: 6,748; Referee: Alain Bieri (Switzerland)

8 August 2013 3rd qualifying round 2nd leg	Kuban Krasnodar (Russia)	1–0 (3–0 agg.)	(Scotland) Motherwell	Krasnodar
21:00 MSK (UTC+4)	McManus 50' (o.g.)	Report		Stadium: Kuban Stadium; Attendance: 31,754; Referee: Cristian Balaj (Romania)

22 August 2013 Play-off round 1st leg	Kuban Krasnodar (Russia)	1–0	(Netherlands) Feyenoord	Krasnodar
20:00 MSK (UTC+4)	Baldé 60'	Report		Stadium: Kuban Stadium; Attendance: 32,275; Referee: Clément Turpin (France)

29 August 2013 Play-off round 2nd leg	Feyenoord (Netherlands)	1–2 (1–3 agg.)	(Russia) Kuban Krasnodar	Rotterdam
23:00 MSK (UTC+4)	Pellè 7'	Report	Popov 19'; Bucur 50'	Stadium: De Kuip; Attendance: 45,000; Referee: Michael Oliver (England)

==== Group stages ====
Pos	Team	Pld	W	D	L	GF	GA	GD	Pts	Qualification	VAL	SWA	KUB	STG
1	(Spain) Valencia	6	4	1	1	12	7	+5	13	Advance to knockout phase	—	0–3	1–1	5–1
2	(England) Swansea City	6	2	2	2	6	4	+2	8	Advance to knockout phase	0–1	—	1–1	1–0
3	(Russia) Kuban Krasnodar	6	1	3	2	7	7	0	6 (Note: Tied on head-to-head points (3). Head-to-head goal difference: Kuban Krasnodar +2, St. Gallen −2.)		0–2	1–1	—	4–0
4	(Switzerland) St. Gallen	6	2	0	4	6	13	−7	6		2–3	1–0	2–0	—

Source: Soccerway
Notes:

19 September 2013 1	St. Gallen (Switzerland)	2–0	(Russia) Kuban Krasnodar	St. Gallen
21:00 MSK (UTC+4)	Karanović 56'; Mathys 76'	Report	Kaboré (yellow card) 72' (yellow-red card) 90+3'	Stadium: AFG Arena; Attendance: 12,551; Referee: Paweł Gil (Poland)

3 October 2013 2	Kuban Krasnodar (Russia)	0–2	(Spain) Valencia	Krasnodar
20:00 MSK (UTC+4)		Report	Alcácer 73'; Feghouli 81'	Stadium: Kuban Stadium; Attendance: 29,300; Referee: Marijo Strahonja (Croatia)

24 October 2013 3	Swansea City (England)	1–1	(Russia) Kuban Krasnodar	Swansea
23:05 MSK (UTC+4)	Michu 68'	Report	Cissé 90+3' (pen.)	Stadium: Liberty Stadium; Attendance: 14,964; Referee: Kristinn Jakobsson (Iceland)

7 November 2013 4	Kuban Krasnodar (Russia)	1–1	(England) Swansea City	Krasnodar
21:00 MSK (UTC+4)	Xandão (yellow card) 1' (yellow-red card) 75'; Baldé 90+2'	Report	Bony 9'	Stadium: Kuban Stadium; Attendance: 27,843; Referee: Robert Schörgenhofer (Austria)

28 November 2013 5	Kuban Krasnodar (Russia)	4–0	(Switzerland) St. Gallen	Krasnodar
21:00 MSK (UTC+4)	Melgarejo 3', 71'; Ignatyev 54'; Kaboré 90'	Report		Stadium: Kuban Stadium; Attendance: 19,032; Referee: Anastassios Kakos (Greece)

12 December 2013 6	Valencia (Spain)	1–1	(Russia) Kuban Krasnodar	Valencia
22:00 MSK (UTC+4)	Alcácer 67'; Ruiz (red card) 90'	Report	Melgarejo 84'	Stadium: Mestalla; Attendance: 14,581; Referee: Miroslav Zelinka (Czech Republic)

== Squad statistics ==
As of Match played 15 May 2014

=== Appearances and goals ===
No.	Pos	Nat	Player	Total		Premier League		Russian Cup		Europa League	
No.	Pos	Nat	Player	Apps	Goals	Apps	Goals	Apps	Goals	Apps	Goals
1	GK	(Russia) RUS	Eduard Baychora	1	0	0	0	1	0	0	0
2	DF	(Moldova) MDA	Igor Armaş	17	1	10+4	1	1	0	2	0
4	DF	(Brazil) BRA	Xandão	37	2	29	2	0	0	8	0
5	DF	(Spain) ESP	Ángel Dealbert	31	1	21+2	1	0	0	8	0
7	FW	(Costa Rica) CRC	Marco Ureña	8	0	0+5	0	1	0	1+1	0
8	MF	(Russia) RUS	Artur Tlisov	26	0	18+2	0	0	0	5+1	0
9	MF	(Russia) RUS	Arsen Khubulov	20	2	10+5	1	1	1	3+1	0
10	MF	(Burkina Faso) BFA	Charles Kaboré	34	1	25+1	0	0	0	8	1
11	FW	(Romania) ROU	Gheorghe Bucur	34	7	20+8	6	0	0	4+2	1
14	MF	(Russia) RUS	Nikita Bezlikhotnov	10	0	3+6	0	0	0	0+1	0
15	DF	(Belarus) BLR	Maksim Zhavnerchik	21	0	15+2	0	0+1	0	2+1	0
18	MF	(Russia) RUS	Vladislav Ignatyev	17	3	10+4	2	0	0	1+2	1
20	FW	(Uruguay) URU	Gonzalo Bueno	6	0	0+3	0	1	0	1+1	0
21	MF	(Ghana) GHA	Mohammed Rabiu	11	1	2+8	1	0	0	1	0
22	MF	(Russia) RUS	Anton Sosnin	25	0	12+7	0	1	0	3+2	0
23	GK	(Russia) RUS	Aleksandr Belenov	39	0	30	0	0	0	9	0
25	DF	(Bulgaria) BUL	Stanislav Manolev	10	1	8+2	1	0	0	0	0
28	DF	(Paraguay) PAR	Lorenzo Melgarejo	23	10	13+4	6	1	1	4+1	3
43	DF	(Russia) RUS	Roman Bugayev	30	0	21+2	0	1	0	6	0
68	FW	(Russia) RUS	Roman Salimov	1	0	0	0	0+1	0	0	0
71	MF	(Bulgaria) BUL	Ivelin Popov	38	9	30	6	0	0	8	3
77	DF	(Russia) RUS	Vladimir Lobkaryov	2	0	0+1	0	1	0	0	0
84	DF	(Russia) RUS	Vasili Pinchuk	1	0	0	0	1	0	0	0
99	FW	(Senegal) SEN	Ibrahima Baldé	28	9	14+5	7	0	0	4+5	2
Players away from Kuban Krasnodar on loan:
	MF	(Russia) RUS	Sergey Karetnik	1	0	0	0	1	0	0	0
Players who left Kuban Krasnodar during the season:
6	MF	(Russia) RUS	David Tsorayev	18	0	8+4	0	0	0	5+1	0
13	FW	(France) FRA	Djibril Cissé	24	5	5+10	4	0	0	5+4	1
17	MF	(Russia) RUS	Artyom Fidler	14	0	7+1	0	0+1	0	2+3	0
24	FW	(Armenia) ARM	Aras Özbiliz	2	2	2	2	0	0	0	0
25	DF	(Russia) RUS	Aleksei Kozlov	27	0	18	0	0	0	9	0

=== Top scorers ===
Place	Position	Nation	Number	Name	Russian Premier League	Russian Cup	Europa League	Total
1	DF	(Paraguay)	28	Lorenzo Melgarejo	6	1	3	10
2	FW	(Senegal)	99	Ibrahima Baldé	7	0	2	9
2	MF	(Bulgaria)	71	Ivelin Popov	6	0	3	9
4	FW	(Romania)	11	Gheorghe Bucur	6	0	1	7
5	FW	(France)	13	Djibril Cissé	4	0	1	5
6	MF	(Russia)	18	Vladislav Ignatyev	2	0	1	3
7	FW	(Armenia)	24	Aras Özbiliz	2	0	0	2
7	DF	(Brazil)	4	Xandão	2	0	0	2
7	MF	(Russia)	9	Arsen Khubulov	1	1	0	2
9	DF	(Spain)	5	Ángel Dealbert	1	0	0	1
9	DF	(Moldova)	2	Igor Armaș	1	0	0	1
9	MF	(Ghana)	21	Mohammed Rabiu	1	0	0	1
9	DF	(Bulgaria)	25	Stanislav Manolev	1	0	0	1
9	MF	(Burkina Faso)	10	Charles Kaboré	0	0	1	1
9				Own goal	0	0	1	1
				TOTALS	40	2	13	55

=== Disciplinary record ===
Number	Nation	Position	Name	Russian Premier League		Russian Cup		Europa League		Total	
Number	Nation	Position	Name	Yellow card	Red card	Yellow card	Red card	Yellow card	Red card	Yellow card	Red card
2	(Moldova)	DF	Igor Armaș	1	0	0	0	2	0	3	0
4	(Brazil)	DF	Xandão	3	0	0	0	2	1	5	1
5	(Spain)	DF	Ángel Dealbert	2	0	0	0	3	0	5	0
6	(Russia)	MF	David Tsorayev	0	1	0	0	0	0	0	1
8	(Russia)	MF	Artur Tlisov	4	0	0	0	0	0	4	0
9	(Russia)	MF	Arsen Khubulov	0	1	0	0	1	0	1	1
10	(Burkina Faso)	MF	Charles Kaboré	10	1	0	0	2	1	12	2
11	(Georgia (country))	FW	Gheorghe Bucur	3	0	0	0	1	0	4	0
13	(France)	FW	Djibril Cissé	1	0	0	0	0	0	1	0
14	(Russia)	MF	Nikita Bezlikhotnov	1	0	0	0	0	0	1	0
15	(Belarus)	DF	Maksim Zhavnerchik	4	0	0	0	0	0	4	0
17	(Russia)	MF	Artyom Fidler	1	0	0	0	0	0	1	0
18	(Russia)	MF	Vladislav Ignatyev	0	0	0	0	1	0	1	0
21	(Ghana)	MF	Mohammed Rabiu	1	0	0	0	0	0	1	0
22	(Russia)	MF	Anton Sosnin	2	0	1	0	1	0	4	0
23	(Russia)	GK	Aleksandr Belenov	2	0	0	0	0	0	2	0
25	(Russia)	DF	Aleksei Kozlov	0	0	0	0	5	0	5	0
25	(Bulgaria)	DF	Stanislav Manolev	1	0	0	0	0	0	1	0
28	(Paraguay)	DF	Lorenzo Melgarejo	3	1	0	0	2	0	5	1
43	(Russia)	DF	Roman Bugayev	3	2	0	0	1	0	4	2
71	(Bulgaria)	MF	Ivelin Popov	2	0	0	0	1	0	3	0
77	(Russia)	DF	Vladimir Lobkaryov	0	0	1	0	0	0	1	0
99	(Senegal)	FW	Ibrahima Baldé	2	0	0	0	0	0	2	0
			TOTALS	46	6	2	0	22	2	70	8
