= 2014–15 FC Kuban Krasnodar season =

Kuban Krasnodar
2014–15 season
- Chairman: Aleksandr Tkachyov
- Manager: Viktor Goncharenko
- Stadium: Kuban Stadium
- Russian Premier League: 10th
- Russian Cup: Runners-up
- Top goalscorer: League: Ibrahima Baldé (5); All: Ibrahima Baldé (7)
- Highest home attendance: 23,100 vs Tosno; 29 October 2014
- Lowest home attendance: 3,362 vs Torpedo Moscow; 29 November 2014
- Average home league attendance: 10,205; 31 May 2015
Home colours	Away colours

The 2014–15 FC Kuban Krasnodar season was the fourth successive season that the club played in the Russian Premier League, the highest tier of football in Russia. They will participate in the Russian Cup as well as the Russian Premier League.

== Squad ==
Updated 28 July 2014, according to the club's official website. Note: Flags indicate national team as defined under FIFA eligibility rules; some limited exceptions apply. Players may hold more than one non-FIFA nationality.

No.	Pos.	Nation	Player
1	GK	RUS	Eduard Baychora
2	DF	MDA	Igor Armaș
4	DF	BRA	Xandão
7	MF	RUS	Vladislav Kulik (on loan from Rubin Kazan)
8	MF	RUS	Artur Tlisov
9	FW	RUS	Arsen Khubulov
10	MF	BFA	Charles Kaboré
11	FW	ROU	Gheorghe Bucur
13	GK	RUS	Yevgeny Pomazan (on loan from Anzhi)
14	DF	BIH	Toni Šunjić
17	MF	GHA	Mohammed Rabiu
18	MF	RUS	Vladislav Ignatyev

No.	Pos.	Nation	Player
20	FW	POR	Hugo Almeida
22	MF	RUS	Anton Sosnin
23	GK	RUS	Aleksandr Belenov
25	DF	PAR	Lorenzo Melgarejo
29	MF	BUL	Stanislav Manolev
38	DF	RUS	Andrey Yeshchenko (on loan from Anzhi)
42	MF	RUS	Sergey Karetnik
43	DF	RUS	Roman Bugayev
71	MF	BUL	Ivelin Popov
73	MF	RUS	Denis Yakuba
77	MF	RUS	Sergei Tkachyov (loan from Lokomotiv Moscow)
99	FW	SEN	Ibrahima Baldé

=== Out on loan ===
Note: Flags indicate national team as defined under FIFA eligibility rules; some limited exceptions apply. Players may hold more than one non-FIFA nationality.

No.	Pos.	Nation	Player
20	MF	URU	Gonzalo Bueno (at Nacional)
95	MF	RUS	Viktor Chuvilov (at Torpedo Armavir)

== Transfers ==
=== Summer ===
In: Note: Flags indicate national team as defined under FIFA eligibility rules; some limited exceptions apply. Players may hold more than one non-FIFA nationality.

No.	Pos.	Nation	Player
7	MF	RUS	Vladislav Kulik (on loan from (Russia) Rubin Kazan)
13	GK	RUS	Yevgeny Pomazan (on loan from (Russia) Anzhi Makhachkala)
14	DF	BIH	Toni Šunjić (from (Ukraine) Zorya Luhansk)
19	FW	BRA	Danilo (on loan from (Ukraine) Zorya Luhansk)
26	MF	LBR	Sekou Oliseh (on loan from (Russia) CSKA Moscow)
38	DF	RUS	Andrey Yeshchenko (on loan from (Russia) Anzhi Makhachkala)
47	DF	RUS	Artur Akhmedzhanov
67	DF	RUS	Nikolai Kostenko
84	DF	RUS	Aleksandr Kleshchenko (from (Russia) Alania-d Vladikavkaz)
87	MF	RUS	Islam Tsaniyev
91	MF	RUS	Anton Moiseyev
93	DF	RUS	Soslan Kagermazov
—	MF	RUS	Sergey Karetnik (end of loan to (Ukraine) Metalurh Donetsk)

Out: Note: Flags indicate national team as defined under FIFA eligibility rules; some limited exceptions apply. Players may hold more than one non-FIFA nationality.

No.	Pos.	Nation	Player
5	DF	ESP	Ángel Dealbert (to (United Arab Emirates) Baniyas)
14	MF	RUS	Nikita Bezlikhotnov (to (Russia) Ufa)
21	FW	CRC	Marco Ureña (loan to (Denmark) Midtjylland)
25	DF	BUL	Stanislav Manolev (to (Russia) Dynamo Moscow)
62	DF	RUS	Sergei Khachaturyan (to (Russia) Torpedo Armavir)
68	FW	RUS	Roman Salimov (to (Russia) Arsenal Tula)
80	MF	RUS	Ruslan Kausarov (to (Russia) Rubin Kazan)
81	MF	RUS	Temuri Bukiya (to (Russia) Volgar Astrakhan)
84	DF	RUS	Vasili Pinchuk (to (Russia) Dynamo St. Petersburg)
96	DF	RUS	Oleg Tolmasov (to (Russia) Alania Vladikavkaz)
—	DF	RUS	Vladimir Lobkaryov (to (Russia) Torpedo Armavir)
—	MF	RUS	Albert Sharipov (to (Russia) Tom Tomsk, previously on loan to (Russia) Fakel Voronezh)
—	MF	RUS	Mikhail Komkov (to (Russia) Tom Tomsk, previously on loan)

=== Winter ===
In: Note: Flags indicate national team as defined under FIFA eligibility rules; some limited exceptions apply. Players may hold more than one non-FIFA nationality.

No.	Pos.	Nation	Player
20	FW	POR	Hugo Almeida (from (Italy) Cesena)
29	MF	BUL	Stanislav Manolev (from (Russia) Dynamo Moscow)
60	MF	RUS	Valeri Zubov
61	FW	RUS	Sergei Obraztsov (from (Russia) TsSPF Krasnodar)
62	MF	RUS	Artyom Yakovlev
63	MF	RUS	Aleksandr Kurteyan (from (Russia) Dynamo St. Petersburg school)
69	MF	RUS	Vladislav Rochev (from (Russia) TsSPF Krasnodar)
77	MF	RUS	Sergei Tkachyov (loan from (Russia) Lokomotiv Moscow)
80	DF	RUS	Aleksandr Ladik
82	GK	RUS	Maksim Zamyshlyayev
87	FW	RUS	Aleksandr Rybakov
96	MF	UKR	Dmytro Shcherbak

Out: Note: Flags indicate national team as defined under FIFA eligibility rules; some limited exceptions apply. Players may hold more than one non-FIFA nationality.

No.	Pos.	Nation	Player
15	DF	BLR	Maksim Zhavnerchik (to (Belarus) BATE Borisov)
19	FW	BRA	Danilo (loan return to (Ukraine) Zorya)
20	FW	URU	Gonzalo Bueno (loan to (Uruguay) Nacional)
21	FW	CRC	Marco Ureña (to (Denmark) Midtjylland, previously on loan)
26	MF	LBR	Sekou Oliseh (loan return to (Russia) CSKA Moscow)
33	GK	RUS	Bogdan Karyukin
47	DF	RUS	Artur Akhmedzhanov (to (Russia) Chernomorets Novorossiysk)
80	MF	RUS	Anton Sekret
87	MF	RUS	Islam Tsaniyev (released)
94	MF	RUS	Andrei Tsepa (released)
95	MF	RUS	Viktor Chuvilov (on loan to (Russia) Torpedo Armavir)

== Friendlies ==
17 January 2014	Kuban Krasnodar (Russia)	0–0	(Kazakhstan) Irtysh	Antalya, Turkey
MSK (UTC+3)		Report

23 January 2014	Kuban Krasnodar (Russia)	2–0	(Azerbaijan) Gabala	Antalya, Turkey
12:00 MSK (UTC+3)	Tkachyov 3'; Baldé 14'; Popov (red card) 37'	Report

== Competitions ==
=== Russian Premier League ===
==== Results by round ====
Round	1	2	3	4	5	6	7	8	9	10	11	12	13	14	15	16	17	18	19	20	21	22	23	24	25	26	27	28	29	30
Ground	H	H	A	H	H	A	A	H	A	A	A	H	A	A	H	H	H	H	A	H	A	H	A	H	A	H	A	A	A	H
Result	W	D	D	W	W	W	D	W	D	L	D	D	W	L	D	D	L	D	L	W	D	L	L	D	L	L	L	L	D	W
Position	6	5	7	7	5	3	4	4	4	4	4	5	5	7	7	7	8	8	8	8	8	8	8	8	8	9	10	10	10	10

Updated to match(es) played on 31 May 2015. Source: Russian Premier League
A = Away; H = Home; W = Win; D = Draw; L = Loss

==== Matches ====
3 August 2014 1	Kuban Krasnodar	2–0	Ufa	Krasnodar
19:30 MSK (UTC+4)	Ignatyev 19'; Kulik (yellow card) 45'; Popov 76' (yellow card) 77'; Yeshchenko (yellow card) 90+4'	Summary	Stepanets (yellow card) 14' (yellow-red card) 90+2'; Tishkin (yellow card) 26'	Stadium: Kuban Stadium; Attendance: 12,228; Referee: Aleksandr Egorov

8 August 2014 2	Kuban Krasnodar	2–2	Rostov	Krasnodar
20:30 MSK (UTC+4)	Popov 6', 65' (pen.); Šunjić (yellow card) 27'	Summary	Kalachev 25' (yellow card) 64'; Abazov (yellow card) 47'; Bastos (yellow card) 63'; Bukharov (yellow card) 63'; Dyakov 90+2'	Stadium: Kuban Stadium; Attendance: 10,988; Referee: Sergey Karasev

15 August 2014 3	Mordovia Saransk	0–0	Kuban Krasnodar	Saransk
20:00 MSK (UTC+4)	Shitov (yellow card) 69'	Summary	Danilo (red card) 69'	Stadium: Start Stadium; Attendance: 6,097; Referee: Alexey Nikolaev

18 August 2014 4	Kuban Krasnodar	1–0	Amkar Perm'	Krasnodar
21:00 MSK (UTC+4)	Sosnin (yellow card) 61'; Kaboré (yellow card) 66'; Popov (yellow card) 78'; Bucur (yellow card) 90' (goal) 90+2'	Summary	Belorukov (yellow card) 17'; Kireyev (yellow card) 41'; Ogude (red card) 64'	Stadium: Kuban Stadium; Attendance: 7,112; Referee: Sergei Ivanov

24 August 2014 5	Kuban Krasnodar	2–1	Lokomotiv Moscow	Krasnodar
19:30 MSK (UTC+4)	Melgarejo 26'; Šunjić 41'; Rabiu (yellow card) 54'; Oliseh (yellow card) 63' (yellow-red card) 90'; Xandão (yellow card) 76'; Popov (yellow card) 81'; Khubulov (yellow card) 90+1'; Belenov (yellow card) 90+3'	Summary	Fernandes 77' (pen.); Ćorluka (yellow card) 90+1'	Stadium: Kuban Stadium; Attendance: 12,172; Referee: Vladislav Bezborodov

30 August 2014 6	Arsenal Tula	0–1	Kuban Krasnodar	Tula
20:00 MSK (UTC+4)	Lozenkov (yellow card) 38'; Bazanov (yellow card) 85'; Ignatyev (yellow card) 87'	Summary	Bucur 86' (yellow card) 90'	Stadium: Arsenal Stadium; Attendance: 12,500; Referee: Aleksei Matyunin

15 September 2014 7	Terek Grozny	0–0	Kuban Krasnodar	Grozny
20:00 MSK (UTC+4)	Kudryashov (yellow card) 13'; Utsiyev (yellow card) 89'	Summary	Kaboré (yellow card) 13' (yellow-red card) 64'; Rabiu (yellow card) 31'; Xandão (yellow card) 57'; Kulik (yellow card) 90+3'	Stadium: Akhmat-Arena; Attendance: 8,000; Referee: Sergei Ivanov

20 September 2014 8	Kuban Krasnodar	2–1	Rubin Kazan'	Krasnodar
17:00 MSK (UTC+4)	Danilo 28'; Yeshchenko (yellow card) 44'; Oliseh 45+2'; Sosnin (yellow card) 63'; Šunjić (yellow card) 90+3'	Summary	Kanunnikov 14'; Kuzmin (yellow card) 31'; Georgiev (yellow card) 86'; Kambolov (yellow card) 90+2'	Stadium: Kuban Stadium; Attendance: 9,111; Referee: Sergey Kulikov

28 September 2014 9	Dynamo Moscow	2–2	Kuban Krasnodar	Moscow
13:30 MSK (UTC+4)	Büttner (yellow card) 8'; Kokorin 20'; Manolev 31'; Yusupov (yellow card) 37'; Vainqueur (yellow card) 81'; Noboa (yellow card) 85'	Summary	Yeshchenko (yellow card) 54'; Ignatyev 55'; Oliseh 60'	Stadium: Arena Khimki; Attendance: 6,638; Referee: Vitaly Meshkov

18 October 2014 10	CSKA Moscow	6–0	Kuban Krasnodar	Khimki
14:30 MSK (UTC+4)	Musa 13', 71'; Eremenko 18'; Armaș 70' (o.g.); Doumbia 85', 90'	Summary	Tlisov (yellow card) 4'; Baldé (yellow card) 68'; Belenov (yellow card) 71'	Stadium: Arena Khimki; Attendance: 7,000; Referee: Igor Nizovtsev

25 October 2014 11	Torpedo Moscow	0–0	Kuban Krasnodar	Ramenskoye
17:00 MSK (UTC+4)	Hugo Vieira (yellow card) 75'; Putsila (yellow card) 83'	Summary	Rabiu (yellow card) 47'	Stadium: Saturn Stadium; Attendance: 1,700; Referee: Vladimir Moskalyov

2 November 2014 12	Kuban Krasnodar	3–3	Spartak Moscow	Krasnodar
19:00 MSK (UTC+3)	Rabiu (yellow card) 23'; Popov (yellow card) 28' (goal) 68' (pen.); Oliseh 47', 55'; Khubulov (yellow card) 90+2'	Summary	Tasci 11' (yellow card) 33'; Yakovlev (yellow card) 14'; Källström 61', 65'	Stadium: Kuban Stadium; Attendance: 16,111; Referee: Mikhail Vilkov

7 November 2014 13	Ural	0–1	Kuban Krasnodar	Yekaterinburg
17:00 MSK (UTC+3)		Summary	Danilo 31' (pen.); Kaboré (yellow card) 37'; Sosnin (yellow card) 89'	Stadium: Central Stadium; Attendance: 3,100; Referee: Sergey Kulikov

22 November 2014 14	Zenit St.Petersburg	1–0	Kuban Krasnodar	Saint Petersburg
19:00 MSK (UTC+3)	Criscito (yellow card) 8'; Hulk 37'	Summary	Kaboré (yellow card) 26'; Kulik (yellow card) 66'	Stadium: Petrovsky Stadium; Attendance: 16,492; Referee: Aleksey Eskov

29 November 2014 15	Kuban Krasnodar	1–1	Torpedo Moscow	Krasnodar
20:15 MSK (UTC+3)	Baldé 34'; Kulik (yellow card) 82'	Summary	Bilyaletdinov 7'; Steklov (yellow card) 52'; Kombarov (yellow card) 87'; Fomin (yellow card) 88'	Stadium: Kuban Stadium; Attendance: 3,362; Referee: Kirill Levnikov

3 December 2014 16	Kuban Krasnodar	1–1	Krasnodar	Krasnodar
20:00 MSK (UTC+3)	Kaboré (yellow card) 53'; Bucur 58'; Xandão (yellow card) 74'; Tlisov (yellow card) 84'; Yeshchenko (yellow card) 86'	Summary	Pereyra 21'; Kaleshin (yellow card) 67'; Laborde (yellow card) 80'; Izmailov (yellow card) 89'	Stadium: Kuban Stadium; Attendance: 11,911; Referee: Alexey Nikolaev

6 December 2014 17	Kuban Krasnodar	0–1	CSKA Moscow	Krasnodar
19:00 MSK (UTC+3)	Melgarejo (yellow card) 35'; Rabiu (yellow card) 60'; Khubulov (yellow card) 84'	Summary	Musa 45'; Wernbloom (yellow card) 73'	Stadium: Kuban Stadium; Attendance: 4,000; Referee: Vladislav Bezborodov

9 March 2015 18	Kuban Krasnodar	0–0	Mordovia Saransk	Krasnodar
18:00 MSK (UTC+3)	Almeida (yellow card) 47'; Popov (yellow card) 74'	Summary	Božović (yellow card) 30'; Shitov (yellow card) 57'; Samodin (yellow card) 82'	Stadium: Kuban Stadium; Attendance: 5,000; Referee: Aleksei Matyunin

16 March 2015 20	Rostov	2–1	Kuban Krasnodar	Rostov-on-Don
19:00 MSK (UTC+3)	Torbinski (yellow card) 25'; Bukharov 51'; Bastos (yellow card) 61'; Kalachev (yellow card) 71'; Doumbia (yellow card) 84'; Azmoun 87' (yellow card) 88'	Summary	Šunjić (yellow card) 19'; Sosnin (yellow card) 50'; Almeida 79'; Yeshchenko (yellow card) 83'	Stadium: Olimp-2; Attendance: 11,000; Referee: Vladimir Moskalyov

22 March 2015 20	Kuban Krasnodar	1–0	Terek Grozny	Krasnodar
18:30 MSK (UTC+3)	Bugayev (yellow card) 37'; Kaboré (yellow card) 49'; Tkachyov 62'; Rabiu (yellow card) 65'; Ignatyev (yellow card) 90+1'; Kulik (yellow card) 90+1'	Summary	Lebedenko (yellow card) 64'; Ivanov (yellow card) 77'; Bokila (yellow card) 90+1'	Stadium: Kuban Stadium; Attendance: 8,497; Referee: Vladislav Bezborodov

4 April 2015 21	Spartak Moscow	1–1	Kuban Krasnodar	Moscow
19:00 MSK (UTC+3)	Kombarov 22' (pen.)	Summary	Armaș (yellow card) 21'; Kaboré (yellow card) 25'; Tkachyov 61'; Sosnin (yellow card) 62'; Xandão (yellow card) 67'; Ignatyev (yellow card) 89'	Stadium: Otkrytie Arena; Attendance: 18,573; Referee: Vitaly Meshkov

8 April 2015 22	Kuban Krasnodar	0–2	Ural	Krasnodar
19:00 MSK (UTC+3)		Summary	Smolov 44', 90'; Stavpets (yellow card) 88'	Stadium: Kuban Stadium; Attendance: 6,041; Referee: Vitaly Rushakov

11 April 2015 23	Krasnodar	3–2	Kuban Krasnodar	Krasnodar
19:00 MSK (UTC+3)	Pereyra 37'; Shirokov 60'; Kaleshin (yellow card) 79'	Summary	Sosnin 30'; Ignatyev 54'; Tkachyov (yellow card) 73'	Stadium: Kuban Stadium; Attendance: 19,000; Referee: Sergei Ivanov

19 April 2015 24	Kuban Krasnodar	0–0	Zenit St.Petersburg	Krasnodar
18:30 MSK (UTC+3)	Rabiu (yellow card) 10'; Sosnin (yellow card) 59'	Summary	Neto (yellow card) 30'; Hulk (yellow card) 90+2'	Stadium: Kuban Stadium; Attendance: 9,733; Referee: Aleksandr Egorov

24 April 2015 25	Ufa	3–2	Kuban Krasnodar	Perm
16:00 MSK (UTC+3)	Tumasyan 25'; Shevchenko (yellow card) 81'; Marcinho 89' (pen.); Alikin 90+3'	Summary	Kulik (yellow card) 60'; Ignatyev 62'; Baldé 79'; Bugayev (yellow card) 89'; Rabiu (yellow card) 90+1'	Stadium: Zvezda Stadium; Attendance: 2,500; Referee: Vitaly Rushakov

3 May 2015 26	Kuban Krasnodar	1–2	Dynamo Moscow	Krasnodar
13:30 MSK (UTC+3)	Almeida 23'; Manolev (yellow card) 45' (yellow-red card) 85'; Bucur (red card) 89'	Summary	Yusupov (yellow card) 44'; Zhirkov (yellow card) 52'; Douglas 69'; Xandão 75' (o.g.)	Stadium: Kuban Stadium; Attendance: 9,211; Referee: Vladimir Moskalyov

8 May 2015 27	Rubin Kazan'	1–0	Kuban Krasnodar	Kazan
19:00 MSK (UTC+3)	Kuzmin (yellow card) 9'; Kvirkvelia (yellow card) 24'; Ozdoev 71'; Kanunnikov (yellow card) 79'; Kislyak (yellow card) 90+1'	Summary	Kaboré (yellow card) 9'; Almeida (yellow card) 31'; Rabiu (yellow card) 77' (yellow-red card)	Stadium: Kazan Arena; Attendance: 4,006; Referee: Alexey Nikolaev

16 May 2015 28	Amkar Perm'	1–0	Kuban Krasnodar	Perm
14:00 MSK (UTC+3)	Jovičić (yellow card) 2'; Prudnikov 27'; Cherenchikov (yellow card) 65'	Summary	Khubulov (yellow card) 31'; Kulik (yellow card) 73'; Almeida (red card) 77'	Stadium: Zvezda Stadium; Attendance: 7,300; Referee: Aleksei Matyunin

25 May 2015 29	Lokomotiv Moscow	1–1	Kuban Krasnodar	Moscow
18:30 MSK (UTC+3)	Fernandes (yellow card) 70' (goal) 87'; Niasse (red card) 81'	Summary	Kulik (yellow card) 5'; Baldé 22'; Šunjić (yellow card) 81'	Stadium: Lokomotiv Stadium; Attendance: 5,054; Referee: Kirill Levnikov

30 May 2015 30	Kuban Krasnodar	5–1	Arsenal Tula	Krasnodar
13:30 MSK (UTC+3)	Baldé 45', 67'; Tkachyov 55', 62'; Kaleshin 81' (o.g.)	Summary	Kašćelan (yellow card) 72'; Kuznetsov 77'	Stadium: Kuban Stadium; Attendance: 6,521; Referee: Sergey Karasev

==== League table ====
Pos	Team	Pld	W	D	L	GF	GA	GD	Pts
8	Mordovia Saransk	30	11	5	14	22	43	−21	38
9	Terek Grozny	30	10	7	13	30	30	0	37
10	Kuban Krasnodar	30	8	12	10	32	36	−4	36
11	Amkar Perm	30	8	8	14	25	42	−17	32
12	Ufa	30	7	10	13	26	39	−13	31

Source: Russian Premier League
Rules for classification: 1) points; 2) number of matches won; 3) head-to-head points; 4) head-to-head wins; 5) head-to-head goal difference; 6) head-to-head goals; 7) number of head-to-head away goals; 8) goal difference; 9) number of goals scored; 10) number of away goals scored

=== Russian Cup ===
24 September 2014 Round of 32	Baltika Kaliningrad	1–2	Kuban Krasnodar	Kaliningrad
21:00 MSK (UTC+4)	Tsukanov 11' (yellow card) 88'; Zinovich (yellow card) 35'	Summary	Šunjić 25'; Khubulov (yellow card) 29'; Bugayev 73'; Baldé (yellow card) 90'	Stadium: Baltika Stadium; Attendance: 6,000; Referee: German Kravchenko

29 October 2014 Round of 16	Kuban Krasnodar	3–0	Tosno	Krasnodar
21:00 MSK (UTC+3)	Popov 26'; Baldé 32', 35'; Kaboré (yellow card) 58'; Yeshchenko (yellow card) 76'	Summary	Zaytsev (yellow card) 59'	Stadium: Kuban; Attendance: 23,100; Referee: Timur Arslanbekov

2 March 2015 Quarterfinals	Kuban Krasnodar	1–0	Mordovia Saransk	Krasnodar
20:00 MSK (UTC+3)	Šunjić 34'; Kulik (yellow card) 78'; Popov (yellow card) 90+3'	Summary	Lutsenko (yellow card) 14'; Shitov (yellow card) 48'; Božović (yellow card) 88'	Stadium: Kuban Stadium; Attendance: 6,200; Referee: Mikhail Vilkov

29 April 2015 Semifinal	Kuban Krasnodar	1–0	CSKA Moscow	Krasnodar
19:30 MSK (UTC+3)	Rabiu (yellow card) 53'; Ignatyev (yellow card) 65'; Almeida 71'; Tkachyov (yellow card) 77'; Bucur (yellow card) 90'	Summary	Milanov (yellow card) 53'; Schennikov (yellow card) 73'	Stadium: Kuban Stadium; Attendance: 22,397; Referee: Sergei Ivanov

==== Final ====
21 May 2015	Lokomotiv Moscow	3–1 (a.e.t.)	Kuban Krasnodar	Astrakhan
19:00 MSK (UTC+3)	Pejčinović (yellow card) 45'; Niasse 73'; Samedov (yellow card) 82'; Boussoufa (yellow card) 87' (goal) 104'; Ćorluka (yellow card) 90'; Al.Miranchuk 111'	Summary	Ignatyev 28' (yellow card) 103'; Rabiu (yellow card) 33'; Šunjić (yellow card) 72'	Stadium: Central Stadium; Attendance: 16,000; Referee: Vladislav Bezborodov

== Squad statistics ==
As of Match played 30 May 2015

=== Appearances and goals ===
No.	Pos	Nat	Player	Total		Premier League		Russian Cup	
No.	Pos	Nat	Player	Apps	Goals	Apps	Goals	Apps	Goals
2	DF	(Moldova) MDA	Igor Armaș	18	0	12+3	0	3	0
4	DF	(Brazil) BRA	Xandão	31	0	27+1	0	3	0
7	MF	(Russia) RUS	Vladislav Kulik	29	0	19+6	0	2+2	0
8	MF	(Russia) RUS	Artur Tlisov	12	0	4+7	0	1	0
9	FW	(Russia) RUS	Arsen Khubulov	17	0	6+9	0	1+1	0
10	MF	(Burkina Faso) BFA	Charles Kaboré	31	0	25+1	0	5	0
11	FW	(Romania) ROU	Gheorghe Bucur	27	3	5+19	3	1+2	0
13	GK	(Russia) RUS	Yevgeny Pomazan	1	0	0	0	1	0
14	DF	(Bosnia and Herzegovina) BIH	Toni Šunjić	26	3	22	1	4	2
17	MF	(Ghana) GHA	Mohammed Rabiu	24	0	17+4	0	2+1	0
18	MF	(Russia) RUS	Vladislav Ignatyev	32	5	19+8	4	3+2	1
20	FW	(Portugal) POR	Hugo Almeida	13	3	6+4	2	3	1
22	MF	(Russia) RUS	Anton Sosnin	28	1	23+1	1	4	0
23	GK	(Russia) RUS	Aleksandr Belenov	34	0	30	0	4	0
25	DF	(Paraguay) PAR	Lorenzo Melgarejo	15	1	11+3	1	1	0
29	MF	(Bulgaria) BUL	Stanislav Manolev	7	0	5+1	0	1	0
38	DF	(Russia) RUS	Andrey Yeshchenko	23	0	20+1	0	2	0
42	MF	(Russia) RUS	Sergey Karetnik	2	0	0+1	0	0+1	0
43	DF	(Russia) RUS	Roman Bugayev	13	1	10+1	0	2	1
71	MF	(Bulgaria) BUL	Ivelin Popov	32	5	24+3	4	5	1
77	MF	(Russia) RUS	Sergei Tkachyov	14	4	9+2	4	3	0
99	FW	(Senegal) SEN	Ibrahima Baldé	24	7	14+5	5	1+4	2
Players away from Kuban Krasnodar on loan:
Players who left Kuban Krasnodar during the season:
15	DF	(Belarus) BLR	Maksim Zhavnerchik	3	0	2	0	1	0
19	FW	(Brazil) BRA	Danilo	17	2	11+4	2	1+1	0
26	MF	(Liberia) LBR	Sekou Oliseh	13	4	9+3	4	1	0

=== Goal scorers ===
Place	Position	Nation	Number	Name	Russian Premier League	Russian Cup	Total
1	FW	(Senegal)	99	Ibrahima Baldé	5	2	7
2	MF	(Bulgaria)	71	Ivelin Popov	4	1	5
2	MF	(Russia)	18	Vladislav Ignatyev	4	1	5
4	MF	(Liberia)	26	Sekou Oliseh	4	0	4
4	MF	(Russia)	77	Sergei Tkachyov	4	0	4
6	MF	(Romania)	11	Gheorghe Bucur	3	0	3
6	FW	(Portugal)	20	Hugo Almeida	2	1	3
6	DF	(Bosnia and Herzegovina)	14	Toni Šunjić	1	2	3
9	FW	(Brazil)	19	Danilo	2	0	2
10	MF	(Paraguay)	25	Lorenzo Melgarejo	1	0	1
10	MF	(Russia)	22	Anton Sosnin	1	0	1
10				Own goal	1	0	1
10	DF	(Russia)	43	Roman Bugayev	0	1	1
				TOTALS	32	8	40

=== Disciplinary record ===
Number	Nation	Position	Name	Russian Premier League		Russian Cup		Total	
Number	Nation	Position	Name	Yellow card	Red card	Yellow card	Red card	Yellow card	Red card
2	(Brazil)	DF	Igor Armaș	1	0	0	0	1	0
4	(Brazil)	DF	Xandão	4	0	0	0	4	0
7	(Russia)	MF	Vladislav Kulik	8	0	1	0	9	0
8	(Russia)	MF	Artur Tlisov	2	0	0	0	2	0
9	(Russia)	FW	Arsen Khubulov	4	0	1	0	5	0
10	(Burkina Faso)	MF	Charles Kaboré	9	1	1	0	10	1
11	(Romania)	FW	Gheorghe Bucur	2	1	1	0	3	1
14	(Bosnia and Herzegovina)	DF	Toni Šunjić	4	0	1	0	5	0
17	(Ghana)	MF	Mohammed Rabiu	10	1	2	0	12	1
18	(Russia)	MF	Vladislav Ignatyev	2	0	2	0	4	0
19	(Brazil)	FW	Danilo	0	1	0	0	0	1
20	(Portugal)	FW	Hugo Almeida	2	1	0	0	2	1
22	(Russia)	MF	Anton Sosnin	6	0	0	0	6	0
23	(Russia)	GK	Aleksandr Belenov	2	0	0	0	2	0
25	(Paraguay)	DF	Lorenzo Melgarejo	1	0	0	0	1	0
26	(Liberia)	MF	Sekou Oliseh	2	1	0	0	2	1
29	(Bulgaria)	DF	Stanislav Manolev	2	1	0	0	2	1
38	(Russia)	DF	Andrey Yeshchenko	5	0	1	0	6	0
43	(Russia)	DF	Roman Bugayev	2	0	0	0	2	0
71	(Bulgaria)	MF	Ivelin Popov	5	0	1	0	6	0
77	(Russia)	MF	Sergei Tkachyov	1	0	2	0	3	0
99	(Senegal)	FW	Ibrahima Baldé	1	0	1	0	1	0
			TOTALS	75	7	13	0	88	7

== Notes ==
- MSK time changed from UTC+4 to UTC+3 permanently on 26 October 2014.
