= Gonzalo Bueno =

Gonzalo Bueno may refer to:

- Gonzalo Bueno (footballer)
- Gonzalo Bueno (tennis)
