= Grushin =

Grushin (masculine, Russian: Грушин) or Grushina (feminine, Russian: Грушинa) is a surname of Russian origin. It is derived from the sobriquet "груша" ("pear"). Notable people with the surname include:

- Aleksandr Grushin (born 1984), Russian footballer
- Andrey Grushin (born 1988), Russian footballer
- Boris Grushin (1929–2007), Russian Soviet philosopher, sociologist and scientist
- Elena Grushina (born 1975), Ukrainian ice dancer
- Olga Grushin (born 1971), Russian-American novelist
- Pyotr Grushin (1906–1993), Russian Soviet rocket scientist
