= Grusin =

Grusin is a surname. Notable people with the surname include:

- Dave Grusin (born 1934), American composer, arranger, producer, and pianist
- Don Grusin (born 1941), American jazz keyboardist, composer, and record producer
- Richard Grusin (born 1953), American new media scholar and author

== See also ==
- Grusin Rosen Production or GRP Records, a jazz record label founded by Dave Grusin and Larry Rosen in 1978
- Grushin (surname)
