= Toni Šunjić =

Bosnian footballer (born 1988)

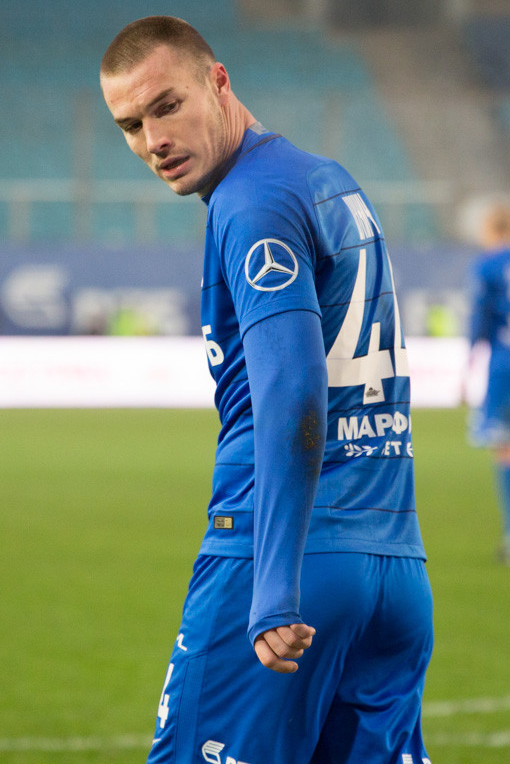
- Šunjić with Dynamo Moscow in 2017

Personal information
- Date of birth: 15 December 1988 (age 37)
- Place of birth: Mostar, SR Bosnia and Herzegovina, SFR Yugoslavia
- Height: 1.94 m (6 ft 4 in)
- Position: Centre-back

Youth career
- Zrinjski Mostar

Senior career*
Years	Team	Apps	(Gls)
2007–2012	Zrinjski Mostar	76	(1)
2010–2011	→ Kortrijk (loan)	15	(0)
2012–2014	Zorya Luhansk	63	(0)
2014–2015	Kuban Krasnodar	28	(1)
2015–2017	VfB Stuttgart	29	(3)
2017	→ Palermo (loan)	7	(0)
2017–2020	Dynamo Moscow	77	(5)
2020–2021	Beijing Guoan	0	(0)
2020	→ Henan (loan)	0	(0)
2021–2023	Henan	71	(1)
2024–2025	Zrinjski Mostar	20	(1)
Total		386	(12)

International career
2006	Bosnia and Herzegovina U19	3	(0)
2008–2010	Bosnia and Herzegovina U21	10	(0)
2012–2020	Bosnia and Herzegovina	41	(1)
- * Club domestic league appearances and goals

Toni Šunjić (pronounced [tǒni ʃûːɲitɕ]; born 15 December 1988) is a Bosnian former professional footballer who played as a centre-back.

Šunjić started his professional career at Zrinjski Mostar, who loaned him to Kortrijk in 2010. In 2012, he joined Zorya Luhansk. Two years later, he moved to Kuban Krasnodar. The following year, he was transferred to VfB Stuttgart, who sent him on loan to Palermo in 2017. Šunjić signed with Dynamo Moscow later that year. In 2020, he joined Beijing Guoan, who loaned him to Henan later that year, with whom he signed permanently a year later. In 2024, he came back to Zrinjski Mostar.

A former youth international for Bosnia and Herzegovina, Šunjić made his senior international debut in 2012, earning over 40 caps until 2020. He represented the nation at their first ever major championship, the 2014 FIFA World Cup.

== Club career ==
=== Early career ===
Šunjić came through the youth academy of his hometown club Zrinjski Mostar. He made his professional debut in a UEFA Europa League qualifier against Partizan on 2 August 2007 at the age of 18. On 3 August 2008, he scored his first professional goal in a triumph over Borac Banja Luka. In August 2010, he was sent on a season-long loan to Belgian outfit Kortrijk.

In January 2012, Šunjić joined Ukrainian team Zorya Luhansk.

In July 2014, he switched to Russian side Kuban Krasnodar.

=== VfB Stuttgart ===
In August 2015, Šunjić was transferred to German outfit VfB Stuttgart for an undisclosed fee. He made his official debut for the squad against Hertha BSC on 12 September and managed to score a goal.

Despite VfB Stuttgart's relegation to the 2. Bundesliga in May 2016, Šunjić decided to stay at the club.

In January 2017, he was loaned to Italian side Palermo until the end of the season.

=== Dynamo Moscow ===
In June, Šunjić signed a two-year deal with Dynamo Moscow. He made his competitive debut for the team on 18 July against their biggest rivals Spartak Moscow. On 3 November, he scored his first goal for Dynamo Moscow against Ural.

In June 2019, he extended his contract with the squad until June 2021.

=== Later stage of career ===
In September 2020, Šunjić moved to Chinese side Beijing Guoan, who loaned him to Henan, with an option to make the transfer permanent, which was activated in January 2021.

In January 2024, he returned to Zrinjski Mostar.

He announced his retirement from football on 20 August 2025.

== International career ==
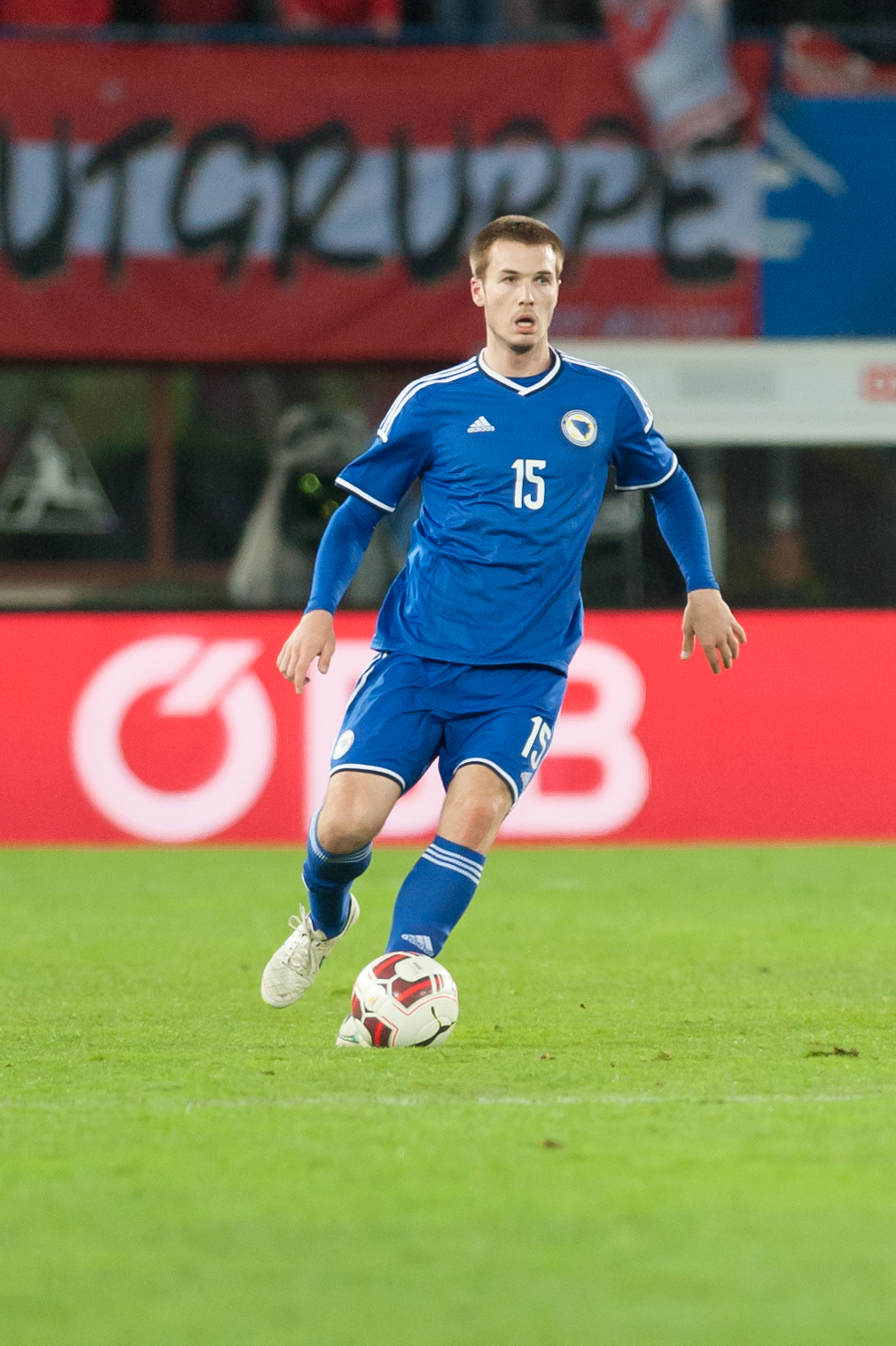
Šunjić playing for Bosnia and Herzegovina in 2015

Šunjić represented Bosnia and Herzegovina at various youth levels.

In August 2012, he received his first senior call up, for a friendly game against Wales, and debuted in that match on 15 August.

In June 2014, Šunjić was named in Bosnia and Herzegovina's squad for the 2014 FIFA World Cup, country's first ever major competition. He made his tournament debut in the second group tie against Nigeria on 22 June.

On 31 August 2017, in a 2018 FIFA World Cup qualifier against Cyprus, Šunjić scored his first senior international goal.

He retired from international football on 24 June 2021.

== Personal life ==
Šunjić is an ethnic Croat. He and his long-time girlfriend Viktoria have two daughters named Stefani and Kiara.

== Career statistics ==
=== Club ===
Appearances and goals by club, season and competition
Club	Season	League			National cup (Note: Includes Bosnian Cup, Belgian Cup, Ukrainian Cup, Russian Cup, DFB-Pokal)		Continental		Other		Total	
Club	Season	Division	Apps	Goals	Apps	Goals	Apps	Goals	Apps	Goals	Apps	Goals
Zrinjski Mostar	2007–08	Bosnian Premier League	7	0	3	0	1 (Note: Appearance(s) in UEFA Cup)	0	–		11	0
Zrinjski Mostar	2008–09	Bosnian Premier League	23	1	3	0	4	1	–		30	2
Zrinjski Mostar	2009–10	Bosnian Premier League	28	0	7	1	2 (Note: Appearances in UEFA Champions League)	0	–		37	1
Zrinjski Mostar	2010–11	Bosnian Premier League	5	0	0	0	6 (Note: Appearances in UEFA Europa League)	1	–		11	1
Zrinjski Mostar	2011–12	Bosnian Premier League	13	0	3	1	–		–		16	1
Zrinjski Mostar	Total		76	1	16	2	13	2	–		105	5
Kortrijk (loan)	2010–11	Belgian Pro League	15	0	1	0	–		–		16	0
Zorya Luhansk	2011–12	Ukrainian Premier League	10	0	1	0	–		–		11	0
Zorya Luhansk	2012–13	Ukrainian Premier League	28	0	1	0	–		–		29	0
Zorya Luhansk	2013–14	Ukrainian Premier League	25	0	1	0	–		–		26	0
Zorya Luhansk	Total		63	0	3	0	–		–		66	0
Kuban Krasnodar	2014–15	Russian Premier League	22	1	4	2	–		–		26	3
Kuban Krasnodar	2015–16	Russian Premier League	6	0	0	0	–		–		6	0
Kuban Krasnodar	Total		28	1	4	2	–		–		32	3
VfB Stuttgart	2015–16	Bundesliga	19	1	3	1	–		–		22	2
VfB Stuttgart	2016–17	2. Bundesliga	10	2	2	0	–		–		12	2
VfB Stuttgart	Total		29	3	5	1	–		–		34	4
Palermo (loan)	2016–17	Serie A	7	0	–		–		–		7	0
Dynamo Moscow	2017–18	Russian Premier League	27	3	1	0	–		–		28	3
Dynamo Moscow	2018–19	Russian Premier League	29	1	1	0	–		–		30	1
Dynamo Moscow	2019–20	Russian Premier League	19	0	0	0	–		–		19	0
Dynamo Moscow	2020–21	Russian Premier League	2	1	0	0	0	0	–		2	1
Dynamo Moscow	Total		77	5	2	0	0	0	–		79	5
Henan (loan)	2020	Chinese Super League	–		–		–		6 (Note: Appearances in Chinese Super League relegation play-offs)	0	6	0
Henan	2021	Chinese Super League	19	0	0	0	–		–		19	0
Henan	2022	Chinese Super League	29	1	0	0	–		–		29	1
Henan	2023	Chinese Super League	23	0	0	0	–		–		23	0
Henan	Total		71	1	0	0	–		6	0	77	1
Zrinjski Mostar	2023–24	Bosnian Premier League	10	0	6	0	–		–		16	0
Zrinjski Mostar	2024–25	Bosnian Premier League	10	1	2	0	6 (Note: Appearances in UEFA Conference League)	0	0	0	18	1
Zrinjski Mostar	2025–26	Bosnian Premier League	0	0	0	0	2 (Note: One appearance in UEFA Champions League; one appearance in UEFA Europa League)	0	0	0	2	0
Zrinjski Mostar	Total		20	1	8	0	8	0	0	0	36	1
Career total			386	12	39	5	21	2	6	0	452	19

=== International ===
Appearances and goals by national team and year
National team	Year	Apps	Goals
Bosnia and Herzegovina
Bosnia and Herzegovina	2012	3	0
Bosnia and Herzegovina	2013	2	0
Bosnia and Herzegovina	2014	9	0
Bosnia and Herzegovina	2015	6	0
Bosnia and Herzegovina	2016	5	0
Bosnia and Herzegovina	2017	4	1
Bosnia and Herzegovina	2018	8	0
Bosnia and Herzegovina	2019	3	0
Bosnia and Herzegovina	2020	1	0
Total		41	1

Scores and results list Bosnia and Herzegovina's goal tally first, score column indicates score after each Šunjić goal.

List of international goals scored by Toni Šunjić
No.	Date	Venue	Cap	Opponent	Score	Result	Competition
1	31 August 2017	GSP Stadium, Nicosia, Cyprus	28	Cyprus	1–0	2–3	2018 FIFA World Cup qualification

== Honours ==
Zrinjski Mostar

- Bosnian Premier League: 2008–09, 2024–25
- Bosnian Cup: 2007–08, 2023–24
- Bosnian Supercup: 2024
