= Gastón Bueno =

Uruguayan footballer (born 1985)

Personal information
- Full name: Gastón Matías Bueno Sciutto
- Date of birth: 2 February 1985 (age 41)
- Place of birth: Montevideo, Uruguay
- Height: 1.83 m (6 ft 0 in)
- Position: Centre-back

Team information
- Current team: Racing de Montevideo
- Number: 3

Senior career*
Years	Team	Apps	(Gls)
2005	Defensor Sporting		
2005–2006	Sambenedettese		
2007–2009	Juventud de Las Piedras		
2009–2010	Progreso		
2010–2011	Central Español	28	(2)
2011–2013	Danubio	27	(1)
2013–2017	Montevideo Wanderers	114	(2)
2017–2019	Danubio	42	(0)
2019–2021	Montevideo Wanderers	38	(0)
2021–	Racing de Montevideo	115	(2)
- * Club domestic league appearances and goals as of 1 October 2025

Gastón Matías Bueno Sciutto (born 2 February 1985) is an Uruguayan professional footballer who plays as a centre-back for Racing de Montevideo.

== Career ==
Born in Montevideo, Bueno has played for Defensor Sporting, Sambenedettese, Juventud de Las Piedras, Progreso, Central Español, Danubio and Montevideo Wanderers.

== Personal life ==
Bueno's brother Santiago and cousin Gonzalo are also professional footballers.
