= Andrey Yeshchenko =

Russian footballer

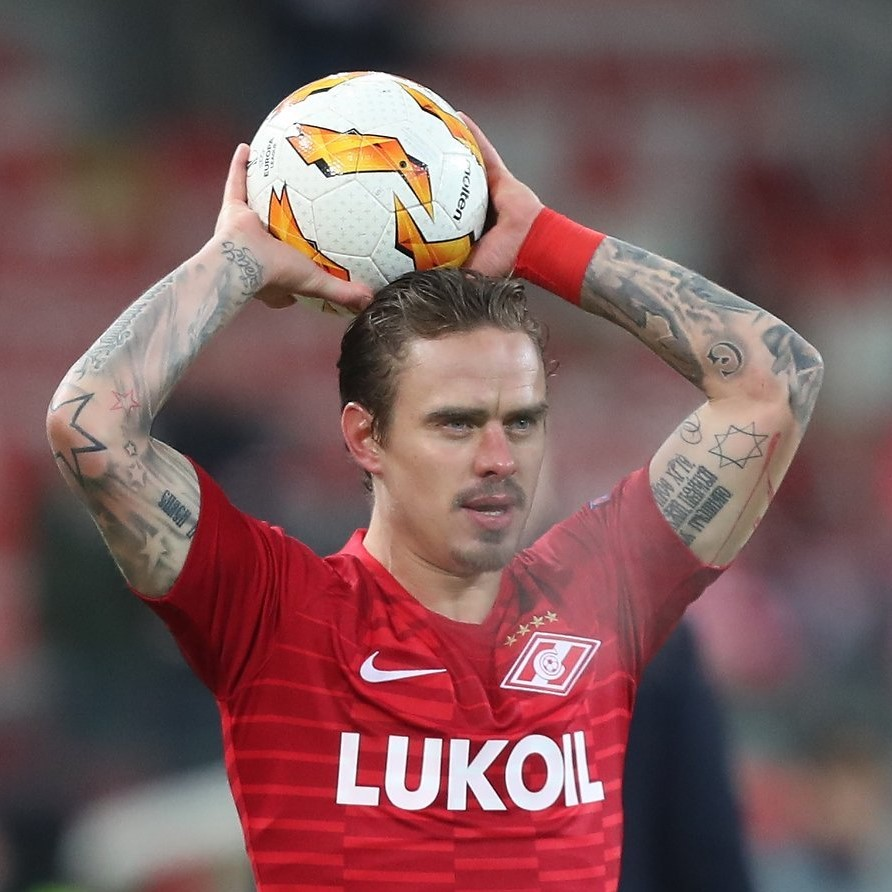
- Yeshchenko with Spartak in 2018

Personal information
- Full name: Andrey Olegovich Yeshchenko
- Date of birth: 9 February 1984 (age 42)
- Place of birth: Irkutsk, Soviet Union
- Height: 1.76 m (5 ft 9 in)
- Position: Right-back

Senior career*
Years	Team	Apps	(Gls)
2003–2004	FC Zvezda Irkutsk	42	(3)
2005–2006	FC Khimki	34	(2)
2006–2011	FC Dynamo Kyiv	11	(1)
2006	→ FC Dynamo Moscow (loan)	9	(0)
2007	→ FC Dynamo-2 Kyiv	9	(0)
2007–2008	→ FC Dnipro Dnipropetrovsk (loan)	20	(0)
2009–2011	→ FC Arsenal Kyiv (loan)	67	(1)
2011	FC Volga Nizhny Novgorod	12	(0)
2012	FC Lokomotiv Moscow	24	(1)
2013–2016	FC Anzhi Makhachkala	34	(0)
2014–2015	→ FC Kuban Krasnodar (loan)	21	(0)
2016	→ FC Dynamo Moscow (loan)	9	(0)
2016–2021	FC Spartak Moscow	89	(1)
2021	→ FC Spartak-2 Moscow	2	(0)
2022–2023	FC Znamya Noginsk	6	(0)

International career
2005–2006	Russia U21	11	(0)
2011	Russia-2	3	(1)
2012–2014	Russia	14	(0)

Managerial career
- 2022: FC Spartak Moscow (assistant)
- 2022–2023: FC Spartak Moscow (academy technical director)
- 2023–2024: FC Kuban Krasnodar (scouting coach)
- 2024–2025: FC Kuban Krasnodar (assistant)
- 2025–2026: FC Kuban Krasnodar
- * Club domestic league appearances and goals

Andrey Olegovich Yeshchenko (Russian: Андрей Олегович Ещенко; born 9 February 1984) is a Russian professional football coach and a former player who played as a right-back.

== Career ==
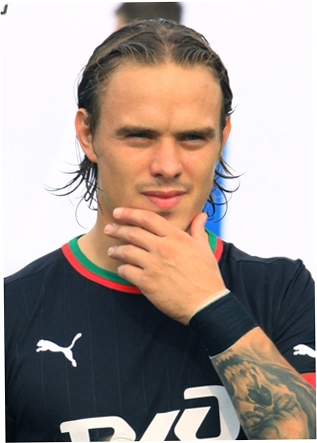
Yehschencko with Lokomotiv in 2012

Yeshchenko became famous appearing in a short spell for FC Dynamo Kyiv in 2006. Although considered a first team player throughout his entire stay in Kyiv, Yeshchenko complained of difficulties adhering to the strict physical regime at Dynamo. In turn, Dynamo management loaned the back to its fellow Muscovite club. He made his Russian Premier League debut for FC Dynamo Moscow on 4 August 2006 in a game against FC Torpedo Moscow.

In October 2012 he was voted FC Lokomotiv Moscow player of the month.

On 1 July 2014, Yeshchenko signed for Kuban Krasnodar on a season-long loan deal with the option to buy.

On 16 June 2016, he signed with FC Spartak Moscow.

== Career statistics ==
As of 13 December 2021

Club	Season	League			Cup		Continental		Other		Total	
Club	Season	Division	Apps	Goals	Apps	Goals	Apps	Goals	Apps	Goals	Apps	Goals
Zvezda Irkutsk	2003	PFL	15	1	3	0	–		–		18	1
Zvezda Irkutsk	2004	PFL	27	2	2	0	–		–		29	2
Zvezda Irkutsk	Total		42	3	5	0	0	0	0	0	47	3
Khimki	2005	FNL	34	2	7	0	–		–		41	2
Dynamo Kyiv	2005–06	UPL	10	1	2	0	–		–		12	1
Dynamo Kyiv	2006–07	UPL	1	0	0	0	0	0	1 (Note: Appearance in Ukrainian Super Cup)	0	2	0
Dynamo Kyiv	Total		11	1	2	0	0	0	1	0	14	1
Dynamo Moscow (loan)	2006	RPL	9	0	1	0	–		–		10	0
Dynamo-2 Kyiv	2006–07	UFL	9	0	–		–		–		9	0
Dnipro (loan)	2007–08	UPL	14	0	0	0	0	0	–		14	0
Dnipro (loan)	2008–09	UPL	6	0	0	0	2	0	–		8	0
Dnipro (loan)	Total		20	0	0	0	2	0	0	0	22	0
Arsenal Kyiv (loan)	2008–09	UPL	11	0	–		–		–		11	0
Arsenal Kyiv (loan)	2009–10	UPL	26	1	1	0	–		–		27	1
Arsenal Kyiv (loan)	2010–11	UPL	30	0	4	0	–		–		34	0
Arsenal Kyiv (loan)	Total		67	1	5	0	0	0	0	0	72	1
Volga Nizhny Novgorod	2011–12	RPL	12	0	0	0	–		–		12	0
Lokomotiv Moscow	2011–12	RPL	7	0	0	0	0	0	–		7	0
Lokomotiv Moscow	2012–13	RPL	17	1	1	0	–		–		18	1
Lokomotiv Moscow	Total		24	1	1	0	0	0	0	0	25	1
Anzhi Makhachkala	2012–13	RPL	2	0	0	0	4	0	–		6	0
Anzhi Makhachkala	2013–14	RPL	16	0	0	0	7	0	–		23	0
Anzhi Makhachkala	2015–16	RPL	16	0	1	1	–		–		17	1
Anzhi Makhachkala	Total		34	0	1	1	11	0	0	0	46	1
Kuban Krasnodar (loan)	2014–15	RPL	21	0	2	0	–		–		23	0
Dynamo Moscow (loan)	2015–16	RPL	9	0	1	0	–		–		10	0
Dynamo Moscow (loan)	Total (2 spells)		18	0	2	0	0	0	0	0	20	0
Spartak Moscow	2016–17	RPL	25	1	0	0	2	0	–		27	1
Spartak Moscow	2017–18	RPL	23	0	3	0	7	0	1 (Note: Appearance in Russian Super Cup)	0	34	0
Spartak Moscow	2018–19	RPL	12	0	0	0	3	0	–		15	0
Spartak Moscow	2019–20	RPL	14	0	1	0	3	0	–		18	0
Spartak Moscow	2020–21	RPL	15	0	0	0	–		–		15	0
Spartak Moscow	2021–22	RPL	0	0	0	0	0	0	–		0	0
Spartak Moscow	Total		89	1	4	0	15	0	1	0	109	1
Spartak-2 Moscow	2020–21	FNL	1	0	–		–		–		1	0
Spartak-2 Moscow	2021–22	FNL	1	0	–		–		–		1	0
Spartak-2 Moscow	Total		2	0	0	0	0	0	0	0	2	0
Career total			383	9	29	1	28	0	2	0	442	10

== International career ==
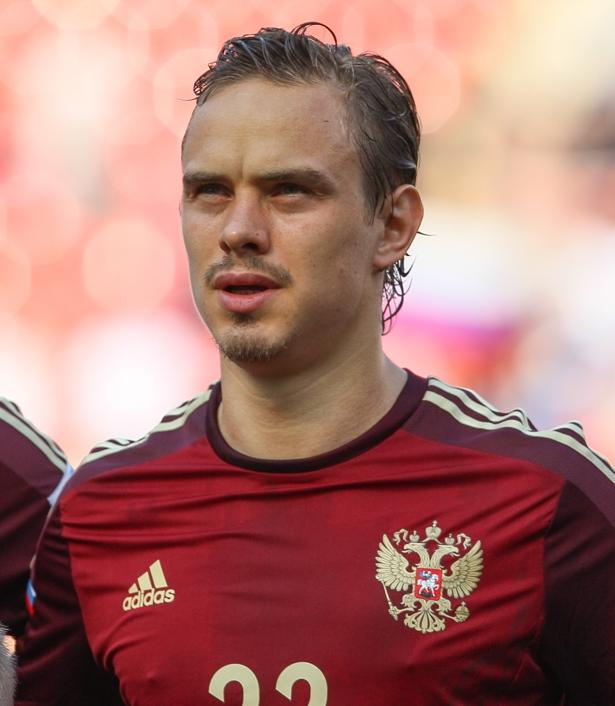
Yeshchencko with Russia in 2014

He made his national team debut on 11 September 2012 in a 2014 FIFA World Cup qualifier against Israel.

On 2 June 2014, he was included in Russia's 2014 FIFA World Cup squad.

== Honours ==
Dynamo Kyiv

- Ukrainian Cup: 2005–06
- Ukrainian Super Cup: 2006

Spartak Moscow

- Russian Premier League: 2016–17
- Russian Super Cup: 2017
