= Nikolay Obolskiy =

Russian footballer (born 1997)

Nikolay Obolsky
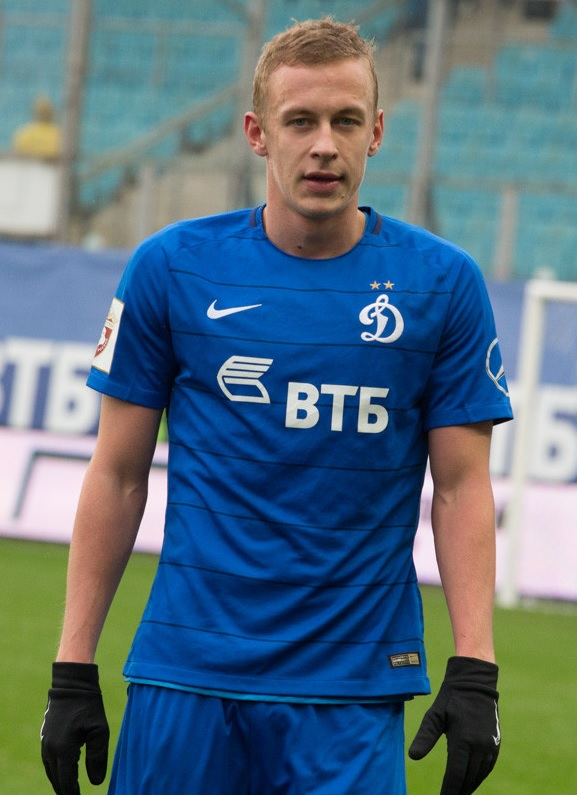
- Obolsky with Dynamo Moscow in 2017

Personal information
- Full name: Nikolay Nikolayevich Obolsky
- Date of birth: 14 January 1997 (age 29)
- Place of birth: Tula, Russia
- Height: 1.86 m (6 ft 1 in)
- Position: Forward

Team information
- Current team: Sabadell

Youth career
- Arsenal Tula
- Dynamo Moscow

Senior career*
Years	Team	Apps	(Gls)
2014–2020	Dynamo Moscow	17	(0)
2016–2017	→ Dynamo-2 Moscow	22	(10)
2018–2019	→ Sochi (loan)	30	(6)
2020	→ Nizhny Novgorod (loan)	2	(0)
2020–2021	Barakaldo	28	(7)
2021–2023	Cultural Leonesa	69	(16)
2023–2024	Ibiza	37	(9)
2024–2026	Córdoba	44	(3)
2026–	Sabadell	11	(0)

International career^{‡}
2012	Russia U15	2	(0)
2012–2013	Russia U16	17	(4)
2013–2014	Russia U17	13	(4)
2014–2015	Russia U18	13	(3)
2015–2016	Russia U19	8	(3)
2016	Russia U21	1	(1)
- * Club domestic league appearances and goals as of 15 November 2026 ‡ National team caps and goals as of 10 November 2016

Nikolay Nikolayevich Obolskiy (Russian: Николай Николаевич Обольский; born 14 January 1997) is a Russian professional footballer who plays as a forward for Segunda División club Sabadell.

== Club career ==
Obolskiy made his professional debut with Dynamo Moscow in a Russian Premier League game against FC Zenit Saint Petersburg.

On 17 February 2020, he joined Nizhny Novgorod on loan until the end of the 2019–20 season.

On 29 August 2020, Obolskiy joined Spanish club Barakaldo. On 2 July 2021, he signed with Cultural Leonesa.

On 14 July 2023, Obolskiy moved to Ibiza.

On 4 July 2024, Obolskiy moved to Córdoba in Segunda División. On 6 August 2026, he agreed to a two-year deal with fellow league team Sabadell.

== Career statistics ==
As of 8 June 2024

Club	Season	League			Cup		Continental		Other		Total	
Club	Season	Division	Apps	Goals	Apps	Goals	Apps	Goals	Apps	Goals	Apps	Goals
Dynamo Moscow	2014–15	Russian Premier League	0	0	0	0	0	0	–		0	0
Dynamo Moscow	2015–16	Russian Premier League	7	0	1	0	–		–		8	0
Dynamo Moscow	2016–17	Russian First League	1	0	0	0	–		–		1	0
Dynamo Moscow	2017–18	Russian Premier League	9	0	1	0	–		–		10	0
Dynamo Moscow	2018–19	Russian Premier League	0	0	–		–		–		0	0
Dynamo Moscow	2019–20	Russian Premier League	0	0	0	0	–		–		0	0
Dynamo Moscow	2020–21	Russian Premier League	0	0	–		–		–		0	0
Dynamo Moscow	Total		17	0	2	0	0	0	0	0	19	0
Dynamo-2 Moscow	2016–17	Russian Second League	22	10	–		–		–		22	10
Sochi (loan)	2018–19	Russian First League	30	6	1	0	–		–		31	6
Nizhny Novgorod (loan)	2019–20	Russian First League	2	0	–		–		–		2	0
Barakaldo	2020–21	Segunda División B	28	7	–		–		1 (Note: Appearance in the Copa Federación)	0	29	7
Cultural Leonesa	2021–22	Primera Federación	32	7	1	0	–		–		33	7
Cultural Leonesa	2022–23	Primera Federación	37	9	–		–		–		37	9
Cultural Leonesa	Total		69	16	1	0	0	0	0	0	70	16
Ibiza	2023–24	Primera Federación	37	9	1	1	–		2 (Note: Appearances in the promotion play-offs)	0	40	10
Career total			205	48	5	1	0	0	3	0	213	49

== Personal life ==
His (non-identical) twin brother Maksim Obolsky was also a footballer previously.
