= Anton Antonov =

Russian football player (born 1998)

Personal information
- Full name: Anton Andreyevich Antonov
- Date of birth: 2 February 1998 (age 28)
- Place of birth: Krasnodar, Russia
- Height: 1.77 m (5 ft 10 in)
- Position: Midfielder

Team information
- Current team: Shinnik Yaroslavl
- Number: 77

Youth career
- –2012: Krasnodar Krai Football Academy
- 2012–2014: CSPF Krasnodar
- 2014–2015: Dynamo Moscow
- 2016–2017: Zemplín Michalovce

Senior career*
Years	Team	Apps	(Gls)
2016	Dynamo-2 Moscow	2	(0)
2017–2018	Zemplín Michalovce	11	(1)
2017	→ Slavoj Trebišov (loan)	5	(0)
2018–2019	Kolos Tsentralny		
2019	Urozhay Krasnodar	12	(0)
2019	Neftekhimik Nizhnekamsk	14	(0)
2020–2026	Chernomorets Novorossiysk	163	(34)
2026–	Shinnik Yaroslavl	0	(0)
- * Club domestic league appearances and goals as of 16 May 2026

Anton Andreyevich Antonov (Russian: Антон Андреевич Антонов; born 2 February 1998) is a Russian football player who plays for Shinnik Yaroslavl.

== Club career ==
He made his debut in the Russian Professional Football League for FC Dynamo-2 Moscow on 20 July 2016 in a game against FC Tekstilshchik Ivanovo.

He made his Russian Football National League debut for FC Neftekhimik Nizhnekamsk on 7 July 2019 in a game against FC Mordovia Saransk.
