= Andrey Grushin =

Russian footballer (born 1988)

Personal information
- Full name: Andrey Olegovich Grushin
- Date of birth: 29 March 1988 (age 38)
- Place of birth: Moscow, Russia
- Height: 1.85 m (6 ft 1 in)
- Position: Goalkeeper

Youth career
- 1996–2003: FC Spartak Moscow
- 2003–2006: FC Dinamo Moscow

Senior career*
Years	Team	Apps	(Gls)
2007–2008	Vålerenga Fotball	0	(0)
2008	FC Volochanin-Ratmir	4	(0)
2008–2009	BFSV Atlantik 97	16	(0)
2009	FC MVD Rossii Moscow	0	(0)
2009	FC Serp i Molot Moscow		
2010	FC Olimp Fryazino	10	(0)
2011–2012	FC Volochanin-Ratmir	19	(0)
2012–2013	FC Zenit Čáslav	2	(0)
2013–2016	TTM FC		

International career
2002–2004	Russia U-16	1	(0)
2004–2005	Russia U-17	6	(0)
2005–2006	Russia U-19	2	(0)
- * Club domestic league appearances and goals

Andrey Olegovich Grushin (Russian: Андре́й Оле́гович Гру́шин; born 29 March 1988) is a former association football goalkeeper from Russia.

== Club career ==
=== Youth career ===
Andrey started playing football with FC Spartak Moscow academy in 1996 and was there until 2003, when he was invited to join FC Dinamo Moscow academy. During the season 2004-2005 Grushin was a captain of the team and in the end received Russian Best Young Goalkeeper.

=== First steps ===
3 years since, in 2006, he was a part of FC Dinamo Moscow reserves team, taking part in 12 matches this season. Next season he spent at Vålerenga Fotball, playing for the reserves as well. He left the team to come back to Russia - to the city of Vyshny Volochyok, where he was signed by Volochanin-Ratmir. He made only 4 appearances for the club before he left Russia again for the German side BFSV Atlantik 97 from Hamburg. There he played in German Oberliga as he wasn't granted a work permit. During this period Grushin was for some time a transfer target for Martin Jol, former HSV coach but Andrey then trained with other Hamburg side FC Sankt-Pauli from 2. Bundesliga. His Atlantik conceded only 5 goals during the season and Andrey was invited to Russian First Division club MVD Rossii by their coach Yuri Kovtun. Grushin signed 5-year contract, but played only for 1 year before the club was proclaimed bankrupt and in the middle of the season-2010 the team was dissolved and the rest of season goalkeeper has played in Moscow region club Olimp Fryazino until finally returned to Volochanin-Ratmir in the end of 2010.

=== Season 2011-2012 ===
By the start of the season 2011-2012 Grushin was back to Volochanin-Ratmir. Since then he became a first-eleven player, making good job at the club and securing from time to time best player of the match and best eleven of the matchday awards. In this season Grushin took part in 27 games, keeping Volochanin in the middle of the table by his secure play. He was named the Best Goalkeeper of the Division in the end of this season.

=== Season 2012 ===
In June 2012 Grushin was invited by former Dinamo head coach Jaroslav Hřebík to join AC Sparta Praha during the pre-season. However, due to some obstacles, Andrey didn't become a part of the team joining Czech Second league side FC Zenit Čáslav instead. In his second match for the team Grushin made a clean sheet which allowed Zenit to hold a win over the second team of Sparta Praha in the last pre-season game. Andrey took part only in 8 full matches of the season as his keeper-colleague Vít Ducheček had some top performances and was rumoured to move to the bigger club. In the end of December 2012 Grushin left the club as a free agent and sealed the contract with Thai side TTM Lopburi F.C.

== International career ==
Andrey Grushin is a Russian international, being a part (consequently) of Russian U-16, U-17 and U-19 squads and making the total of 9 appearances in international matches. Andrey was a part of Russia U-17 team which participated in qualifying round for UEFA European Under-17 Football Championship in 2005. Drawn to the Group 4 with Belarus, Finland and Bulgaria, Russia took 6 points and placed second which didn't allow it to go through the final round.

== Young Football Talents Football Agency ==
Andrey Grushin founded the famous football agency Young Football Talents or often called YFT. This agency houses many talented young football players around the world. YFT has many talent scouts around the world. Some of the names of the players at Andrey Grushin's agency are Dang Van Lam, Nelson Bonilla, Brayan Angulo and also Razzaa Fachrezi with Faqih Maulana from Indonesia.

Andrey Grushin collaborates with his colleague Arya Pradana Budiarto, an Indonesian who has lived in Switzerland and Russia for a long time. He also works as a Sports Doctor and Top Sports Journalist and currently works as a media officer in FIFA AFC and for the Russian club FC Ural Yekaterinburg. Arya Pradana Budiarto also the owner of the famous media Indonesia Rusia or Voice of Rusia Indonesia.

== Sport Director FC Pafos Cyprus ==
Andrey Grushin was also the sports director of the Cypriot club FC Pafos. and Andrey worked with PFC Pafos Owner who is also Russian Sergey Lomakin owner of the famous Russian retail store Fix Price.
