= Aleksandr Tashayev =

Russian footballer (born 1994)

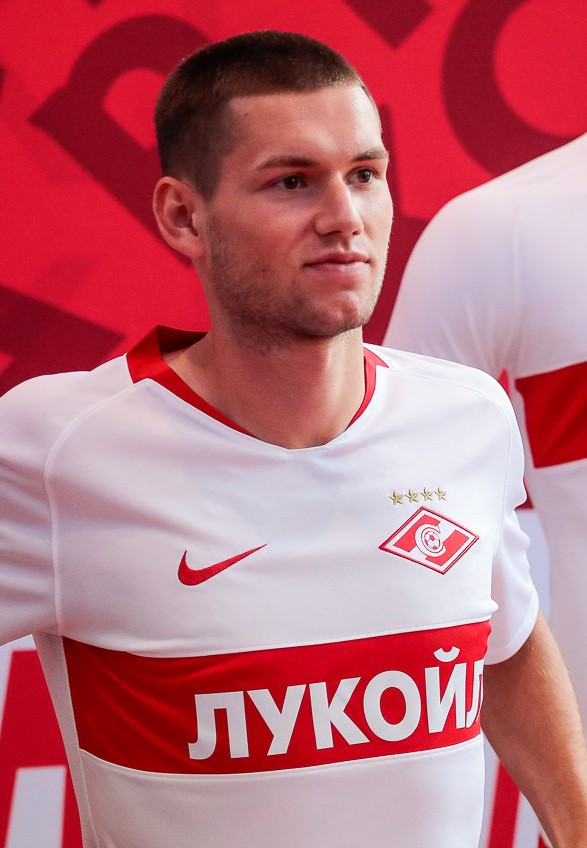

Personal information
- Full name: Aleksandr Mikhailovich Tashayev
- Date of birth: 23 June 1994 (age 32)
- Place of birth: Moscow, Russia
- Height: 1.79 m (5 ft 10 in)
- Position: Midfielder

Senior career*
Years	Team	Apps	(Gls)
2011–2018	Dynamo Moscow	76	(9)
2018–2021	Spartak Moscow	20	(0)
2019–2020	→ Rubin Kazan (loan)	7	(0)
2020–2021	→ Spartak-2 Moscow	16	(0)
2021–2022	Rotor Volgograd	22	(0)
2022–2023	Alania Vladikavkaz	7	(1)

International career
2012–2013	Russia U19	3	(0)
2015–2016	Russia U21	7	(1)
- * Club domestic league appearances and goals

Aleksandr Mikhailovich Tashayev (Russian: Александр Михайлович Ташаев; born 23 June 1994) is a Russian former professional football player who played as a left midfielder.

== Club career ==
He made his professional debut on 11 December 2014 for FC Dynamo Moscow in a 2014–15 UEFA Europa League group game against PSV Eindhoven. He also played in the Round of 16 away game against Napoli.

On 6 July 2018, he signed a contract with the cross-city rivals FC Spartak Moscow, after buying out own contract from Dynamo and becoming a free agent. Dynamo unsuccessfully sued to deem the buyout clause in his contract invalid.

On 2 September 2019, he joined Rubin Kazan on loan for the rest of the 2019–20 season.

On 3 June 2021, his contract with Spartak was terminated by mutual consent.

On 21 June 2021, he joined Rotor Volgograd, reuniting with his former Dynamo manager Dmitri Khokhlov.

== International career ==
On 11 May 2018, he was included in Russia's extended 2018 FIFA World Cup squad, which was the first time he was called up to the senior national team. He was not included in the finalized World Cup squad.

== Career statistics ==
As of 13 May 2018

Club	Season	League			Cup		Continental		Total	
Club	Season	Division	Apps	Goals	Apps	Goals	Apps	Goals	Apps	Goals
FC Dynamo Moscow	2011–12	Premier League	0	0	0	0	–		0	0
FC Dynamo Moscow	2012–13	Premier League	0	0	0	0	0	0	0	0
FC Dynamo Moscow	2013–14	Premier League	0	0	0	0	–		0	0
FC Dynamo Moscow	2014–15	Premier League	1	0	0	0	2	0	3	0
FC Dynamo Moscow	2015–16	Premier League	25	1	3	2	–		28	3
FC Dynamo Moscow	2016–17	National League	23	1	1	0	–		24	1
FC Dynamo Moscow	2017–18	Premier League	27	7	1	0	–		28	7
Career total			76	9	5	2	2	0	83	11
