= Xandão (footballer, born 1988) =

Brazilian footballer

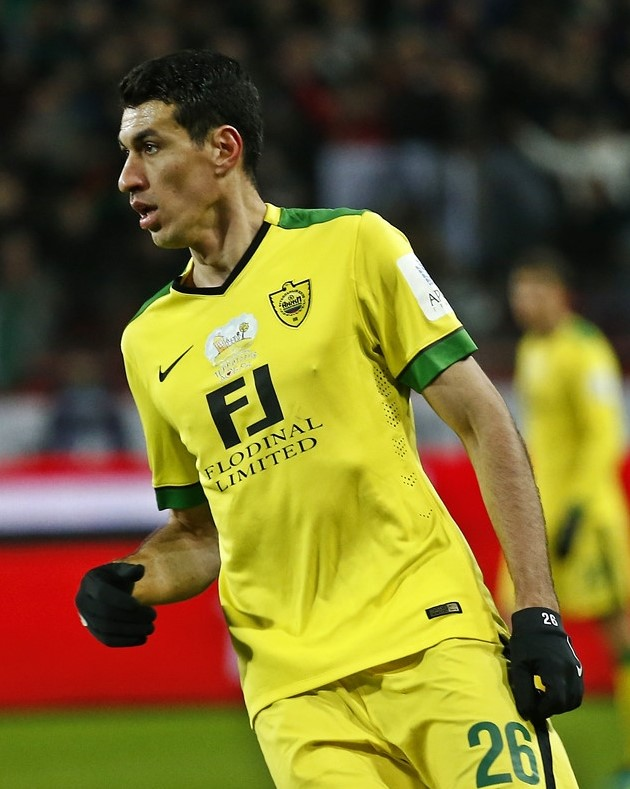
- Xandão with Anzhi Makhachkala in 2016

Personal information
- Full name: Alexandre Luiz Reame
- Date of birth: 23 February 1988 (age 38)
- Place of birth: Araçatuba, Brazil
- Height: 1.93 m (6 ft 4 in)
- Position: Centre-back

Youth career
- Guarani

Senior career*
Years	Team	Apps	(Gls)
2005–2008	Guarani	38	(3)
2006–2007	→ Atlético-PR (loan)	32	(1)
2008–2009	Desportivo Brasil	15	(0)
2009	→ Fluminense (loan)	0	(0)
2009–2010	→ Barueri (loan)	30	(0)
2010–2011	→ São Paulo (loan)	44	(1)
2012–2013	→ Sporting CP (loan)	23	(1)
2013–2016	Kuban Krasnodar	94	(3)
2016–2017	Anzhi Makhachkala	7	(0)
2017–2018	Sporting Gijón	2	(0)
2018–2019	Cercle Brugge	5	(0)
2019	Red Bull Brasil	0	(0)
2019	Guarani	7	(0)
2019	Persija Jakarta	19	(3)
Total		316	(12)
- * Club domestic league appearances and goals

Alexandre Luiz Reame (born 23 February 1988), better known as Xandão (Brazilian Portuguese: [ʃɐ̃ˈdɐ̃w]), is a Brazilian former footballer who played as a centre back.

== Career ==
On 10 December 2009 São Paulo FC signed the defender from Desportivo Brasil. Xandão scored his first goal for Sporting CP in the UEFA Europa League against Manchester City in the 51st minute by a backheel from five yards.

On 15 February 2013, Xandão terminated his loan with Sporting and was bought by Kuban Krasnodar.

On 17 August 2016, Xandão signed a three-year contract with Anzhi Makhachkala.

On 30 August 2019, Xandão signed a one-year contract with Persija Jakarta

== Career statistics ==
Appearances and goals by club, season and competition
Club	Season	League		Cup		League Cup		Europe		Other (Note: Includes other competitive competitions.)		Total	
Club	Season	Apps	Goals	Apps	Goals	Apps	Goals	Apps	Goals	Apps	Goals	Apps	Goals
Sporting CP (loan)	2011–12	10	0	1	0	–		7	1	–		18	1
Sporting CP (loan)	2012–13	13	1	0	0	3	1	5	0	–		21	2
Sporting CP (loan)	Total	23	1	1	0	3	1	12	1	0	0	39	3
Kuban Krasnodar	2012–13	10	0	0	0	–		–		–		10	0
Kuban Krasnodar	2013–14	29	2	0	0	-		8	0	–		37	2
Kuban Krasnodar	2014–15	28	0	3	0	–		–		–		31	0
Kuban Krasnodar	2015–16	27	1	1	0	–		–		2	0	30	1
Kuban Krasnodar	Total	94	3	4	0	0	0	8	0	2	0	108	3
Career total		117	4	5	0	3	1	20	1	2	0	147	6
