= Aleksandr Grushin =

Russian footballer (born 1984)

Personal information
- Full name: Aleksandr Petrovich Grushin
- Date of birth: 8 March 1984 (age 42)
- Place of birth: Barnaul, Russian SFSR
- Height: 1.71 m (5 ft 7 in)
- Position: Defender

Youth career
- FC Dynamo Barnaul

Senior career*
Years	Team	Apps	(Gls)
1999	FC Dynamo Barnaul	0	(0)
2002	FC Dynamo Barnaul	0	(0)
2004	FC Dynamo Barnaul	0	(0)
2004	FC Shakhtyor Prokopyevsk	11	(0)
2005	FC Dynamo Barnaul	1	(0)
2005	FC Shakhtyor Prokopyevsk	10	(0)
2006–2008	FC Dynamo Barnaul	93	(0)
2009–2010	FC Metallurg-Kuzbass Novokuznetsk	54	(0)
2011–2012	FC KUZBASS Kemerovo	33	(1)
2012–2016	FC Ryazan	107	(0)
2016–2018	FC Dynamo Barnaul	32	(0)
- * Club domestic league appearances and goals

Aleksandr Petrovich Grushin (Russian: Александр Петрович Грушин; born 8 March 1984) is a Russian former professional football player.

== Club career ==
He played in the Russian Football National League for FC Dynamo Barnaul in 2008.
