= Vladimir Lobkaryov =

Russian footballer

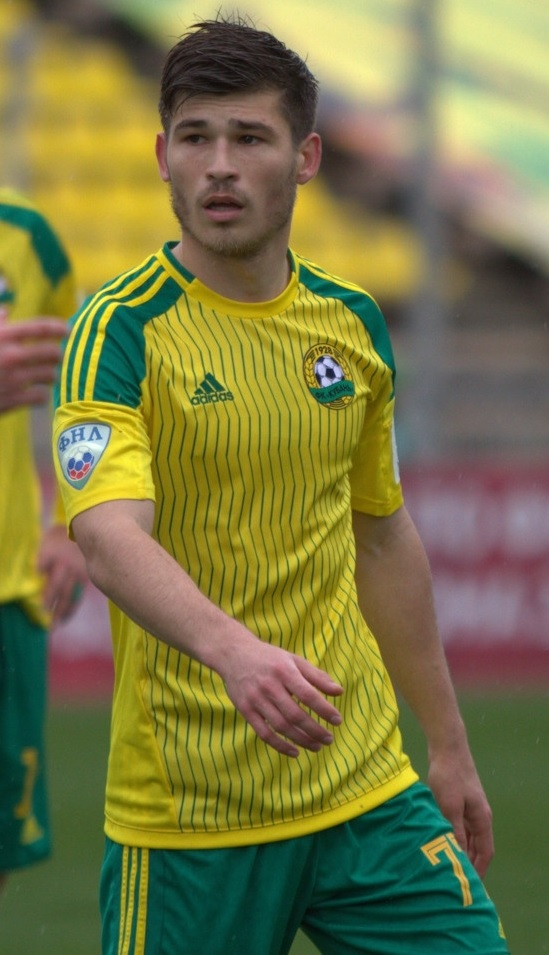
- Lobkaryov with Kuban Krasnodar in 2017

Personal information
- Full name: Vladimir Nikolayevich Lobkaryov
- Date of birth: 17 September 1993 (age 33)
- Place of birth: Novorossiysk, Russia
- Height: 1.82 m (6 ft 0 in)
- Positions: Defender; midfielder

Youth career
- Kuban Krasnodar

Senior career*
Years	Team	Apps	(Gls)
2011–2014	Kuban Krasnodar	1	(0)
2012–2013	→ Torpedo Armavir (loan)	27	(0)
2014–2015	→ Torpedo Armavir (loan)	28	(13)
2015–2018	Kuban Krasnodar	72	(11)
2018–2019	Rotor Volgograd	39	(4)
2020	Armavir	0	(0)
2020	Volgar Astrakhan	18	(2)
2021–2023	Kuban Krasnodar	34	(4)
2023	Amkal Moscow		
- * Club domestic league appearances and goals

Vladimir Nikolayevich Lobkaryov (Russian: Владимир Николаевич Лобкарёв; born 17 September 1993) is a Russian former professional football player.

== Club career ==
He made his debut in the Russian Second Division for Torpedo Armavir on 26 July 2012 in a game against Angusht Nazran.

He made his debut for Kuban Krasnodar on 12 December 2013 in a Europa League game against Valencia. He made his Russian Premier League debut for Kuban on 10 March 2014 against Rostov.

== Career statistics ==
As of 22 August 2023

Club	Season	League			Cup		Continental		Other		Total	
Club	Season	Division	Apps	Goals	Apps	Goals	Apps	Goals	Apps	Goals	Apps	Goals
Torpedo Armavir (loan)	2012–13	Russian Second League	27	0	3	0	–		–		30	0
Kuban Krasnodar	2013–14	Russian Premier League	1	0	1	0	1 (Note: Appearance in the UEFA Europa League)	0	–		3	0
Kuban Krasnodar	2015–16	Russian Premier League	10	0	1	0	–		2 (Note: Appearances in the relegation play-offs)	0	13	0
Kuban Krasnodar	2016–17	Russian First League	31	5	0	0	–		5 (Note: Appearances in the FNL Cup)	0	36	5
Kuban Krasnodar	2017–18	Russian First League	31	6	0	0	–		–		31	6
Kuban Krasnodar	Total		73	11	2	0	1	0	7	0	83	11
Torpedo Armavir (loan)	2014–15	Russian Second League	28	13	0	0	–		–		28	13
Rotor Volgograd	2018–19	Russian First League	29	2	1	0	–		4	1	34	3
Rotor Volgograd	2019–20	Russian First League	10	2	1	0	–		–		11	2
Rotor Volgograd	Total		39	4	2	0	0	0	4	1	45	5
Armavir	2019–20	Russian First League	0	0	–		–		–		0	0
Volgar Astrakhan	2020–21	Russian First League	18	2	1	0	–		–		19	2
Kuban Krasnodar	2020–21	Russian Second League	10	3	–		–		–		10	3
Kuban Krasnodar	2021–22	Russian First League	19	1	1	0	–		–		20	1
Kuban Krasnodar	2022–23	Russian First League	5	0	0	0	–		–		5	0
Kuban Krasnodar	Total		34	4	1	0	0	0	0	0	35	4
Amkal Moscow	2023–24	Media Football League	–		2	1	–		–		2	1
Career total			219	34	11	1	1	0	11	1	242	36
