= Gonzalo Bueno (footballer) =

Uruguayan footballer (born 1993)

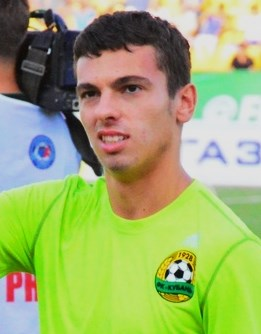

Personal information
- Full name: Gonzalo Diego Bueno Bingola
- Date of birth: 16 January 1993 (age 33)
- Place of birth: Maldonado, Uruguay
- Height: 1.75 m (5 ft 9 in)
- Position: Forward

Team information
- Current team: Danubio
- Number: 18

Youth career
- 2004–2011: Nacional

Senior career*
Years	Team	Apps	(Gls)
2011–2013	Nacional	51	(14)
2013–2015	Kuban	3	(0)
2015	→ Nacional (loan)	7	(1)
2015	→ União da Madeira (loan)	1	(0)
2016–2019	Patriotas Boyacá	0	(0)
2016	→ Estudiantes (loan)	3	(0)
2016–2017	→ Defensor (loan)	33	(11)
2017–2018	→ Nacional (loan)	21	(4)
2018–2019	→ Colón (loan)	10	(2)
2019	Almería	0	(0)
2020	Universidad de Concepción	6	(1)
2020–2021	Liverpool	13	(3)
2021	Defensor	6	(1)
2021–2022	Boston River	8	(0)
2022	Central Español	25	(4)
2023	Pontevedra	1	(0)
2023–	Danubio	27	(3)

International career
2013	Uruguay U20	10	(2)
2012	Uruguay Olympic	1	(0)
- * Club domestic league appearances and goals as of 20:42, 19 January 2024 (UTC)

Gonzalo Diego Bueno Bingola (born 16 January 1993) is a Uruguayan professional footballer who plays as a winger for Uruguayan Primera División club Danubio. He also played for the Uruguay U20 national team. Besides Uruguay, he has played in Russia, Portugal, Colombia, and Spain.

== Club career ==
=== Nacional ===
Born in Maldonado, Bueno was a Nacional youth graduate. He made his first team – and Primera División – debut on 4 June 2011, in a 2–0 home loss against Rampla Juniors.

Bueno scored his first professional goal in his second appearance for the main squad on 18 September 2011, netting his team's second in a 4–0 home routing of Cerro Largo. He subsequently became a regular starter for the side.

=== Kuban Krasnodar ===
On 22 August 2013, Bueno signed for Russia's FC Kuban Krasnodar on a long-term contract. On 25 December 2014, after being rarely used and struggling with injuries, he was loaned to former club Nacional for six months.

On 29 August 2015, Bueno joined Primeira Liga side C.F. União also in a temporary deal, but the loan was cut short in December after only two appearances.

=== Back to South America ===
Bueno signed for Colombian side Patriotas Boyacá in late 2015, being immediately loaned to Estudiantes de la Plata for 18 months. In the following campaigns, he represented Defensor Sporting, Nacional and Colón, always in temporary deals.

=== Almería ===
On 22 July 2019, free agent Bueno signed a two-year contract with Segunda División side UD Almería, with an option for a third. He revoked his contract on 27 August 2019 following a change in the club's ownership and managerial staff.

== Personal life ==
Bueno's father Gustavo and cousins Gastón and Santiago have also played football professionally. Gustavo has most recently acted as manager of Sud América, while Gastón and Santi play for Montevideo Wanderers and Wolverhampton Wanderers respectively.
