= 2015–16 FC Kuban Krasnodar season =

FC Kuban Krasnodar
2015–16 season
- Chairman: Aleksandr Tkachyov
- Manager: Sergei Tashuyev
- Stadium: Kuban Stadium
- Russian Premier League: 13th
- Russian Cup: Quarterfinal vs Zenit St.Petersburg
- Top goalscorer: League: Lorenzo Melgarejo (8); All: Lorenzo Melgarejo (9)

The 2015–16 FC Kuban Krasnodar season was their fifth season in the Russian Premier League, the highest tier of association football in Russia.

== Squad ==
As of 25 February 2016

Note: Flags indicate national team as defined under FIFA eligibility rules; some limited exceptions apply. Players may hold more than one non-FIFA nationality.

No.	Pos.	Nation	Player
1	GK	RUS	Yevgeni Frolov
2	DF	MDA	Igor Armaș
4	DF	BRA	Xandão
5	MF	GHA	Mohammed Rabiu
7	MF	RUS	Vladislav Kulik
9	FW	RUS	Roman Pavlyuchenko
10	FW	UKR	Yevhen Seleznyov
11	FW	ROU	Gheorghe Bucur
13	GK	RUS	Nikita Khaykin
14	MF	RUS	Roman Kontsedalov
15	DF	RUS	Georgi Zotov
16	DF	BUL	Stanislav Manolev
17	MF	RUS	Svyatoslav Georgiyevsky
20	MF	UKR	Sergey Karetnik

No.	Pos.	Nation	Player
21	DF	RUS	Vladimir Lobkaryov
22	DF	BRA	Apodi
23	GK	RUS	Aleksandr Belenov
27	DF	BRA	Felipe Santana
30	MF	UKR	Ihor Zhurakhovskyi
43	DF	RUS	Roman Bugayev
72	MF	RUS	Igor Konovalov
73	MF	RUS	Denis Yakuba
78	FW	RUS	Arsen Khubulov
83	FW	RUS	Maksim Mayrovich
84	DF	RUS	Aleksandr Kleshchenko
91	GK	MDA	Dmitri Stajila
99	FW	SEN	Ibrahima Baldé

=== Youth squad ===
Note: Flags indicate national team as defined under FIFA eligibility rules; some limited exceptions apply. Players may hold more than one non-FIFA nationality.

No.	Pos.	Nation	Player
31	MF	RUS	Yuri Zavezyon
46	DF	RUS	Yuri Zhuravlyov
57	DF	RUS	Ruslan Khagur
58	DF	RUS	Vladislav Puchkov
60	MF	RUS	Yuri Mitrokhin
61	FW	RUS	Alan Khachirov
62	FW	RUS	Ilya Stefanovich
63	MF	RUS	Nikita Kozlovskiy
64	DF	RUS	Timur Zakirov
65	DF	RUS	Ruslan Dzhamalutdinov
67	GK	RUS	Maksim Borisko
68	DF	RUS	Aleksei Ivanushkin
69	MF	RUS	Mikhail Babkin
70	MF	RUS	Aleksandr Dzhumayev
74	MF	RUS	Nikita Skuridin
79	GK	RUS	Vladislav Shevchenko

No.	Pos.	Nation	Player
80	DF	RUS	Daniil Marugin
81	MF	RUS	Maksim Sidorov
82	GK	RUS	Aleksandr Akishin
85	MF	RUS	Yakov Minkov
86	MF	RUS	Kirill Volchkov
87	FW	RUS	Aleksandr Rybakov
89	MF	RUS	Vladislav Tyufyakov
90	MF	RUS	Ilmir Nurisov
92	MF	RUS	Dmitriy Galkin
93	DF	RUS	Soslan Kagermazov
94	GK	RUS	Nalbiy Sidzhakh
95	MF	RUS	Igor Ponomaryov
96	MF	UKR	Dmytro Shcherbak
97	MF	RUS	Kirill Shekhovtsov
98	GK	RUS	Ilya Sotsunov

== Transfers ==
=== Summer ===
In: Note: Flags indicate national team as defined under FIFA eligibility rules; some limited exceptions apply. Players may hold more than one non-FIFA nationality.

No.	Pos.	Nation	Player
1	GK	RUS	Yevgeni Frolov (from (Russia) Dynamo Moscow)
9	FW	RUS	Roman Pavlyuchenko (from (Russia) Lokomotiv Moscow)
10	MF	RUS	Andrei Arshavin (from (Russia) Zenit Saint Petersburg)
13	GK	RUS	Nikita Khaykin (from (Russia) Mordovia Saransk)
17	MF	RUS	Svyatoslav Georgiyevsky (from (Russia) CSKA Moscow)
21	DF	RUS	Vladimir Lobkaryov (from (Russia) Torpedo Armavir)
60	MF	RUS	Yuri Mitrokhin
62	FW	RUS	Ilya Stefanovich (from (Russia) Znamya Truda Orekhovo-Zuyevo)
63	MF	RUS	Nikita Kozlovsky (from (Russia) LFK Lokomotiv Moscow)
68	DF	RUS	Aleksei Ivanushkin (from (Russia) Spartak Moscow)
69	DF	RUS	Ilya Shushkin
74	MF	RUS	Konstantin Kurkulov
77	MF	RUS	Sergei Tkachyov (from (Russia) Lokomotiv Moscow, previously on loan)
80	DF	RUS	Daniil Marugin
82	GK	RUS	Aleksandr Akishin (from (Russia) Lokomotiv Moscow)
85	MF	RUS	Yakov Minkov (from (Russia) Afips Afipsky)
92	MF	RUS	Dmitri Galkin (from (Russia) LFK Lokomotiv Moscow)

Out: Note: Flags indicate national team as defined under FIFA eligibility rules; some limited exceptions apply. Players may hold more than one non-FIFA nationality.

No.	Pos.	Nation	Player
1	GK	RUS	Eduard Baychora (to (Russia) Tosno)
10	MF	BFA	Charles Kaboré (on loan to (Russia) Krasnodar)
13	GK	RUS	Yevgeny Pomazan (end of loan from (Russia) Anzhi Makhachkala)
14	DF	BIH	Toni Šunjić (to (Germany) VfB Stuttgart)
20	FW	POR	Hugo Almeida (to (Russia) Anzhi Makhachkala)
22	MF	RUS	Anton Sosnin (to (Russia) Dynamo Moscow)
38	DF	RUS	Andrey Yeshchenko (end of loan from (Russia) Anzhi Makhachkala)
60	MF	RUS	Valeri Zubov
62	MF	RUS	Artyom Yakovlev
63	FW	RUS	Aleksandr Kurteyan
68	DF	RUS	Anatoli Khubezhov
69	MF	RUS	Vladislav Rochev
71	MF	BUL	Ivelin Popov (to (Russia) Spartak Moscow)
79	GK	RUS	Vladislav Shevchenko (to (Russia) Biolog-Novokubansk)
80	DF	RUS	Aleksandr Ladik
82	GK	RUS	Maksim Zamyshlyayev
85	FW	RUS	Igor Zaporozhtsev
91	MF	RUS	Anton Moiseyev (to (Russia) Feniks Bolshoy Beysug)
92	FW	RUS	Maksim Lauk (to (Russia) Dynamo Kirov)
95	FW	RUS	Vardan Pogosyan (on loan to (Armenia) Pyunik Yerevan)
—	FW	URU	Gonzalo Bueno (on loan to (Portugal) União da Madeira, previously on loan to (Uruguay) Nacional)

=== Winter ===
In: Note: Flags indicate national team as defined under FIFA eligibility rules; some limited exceptions apply. Players may hold more than one non-FIFA nationality.

No.	Pos.	Nation	Player
10	FW	UKR	Yevhen Seleznyov (from (Ukraine) Dnipro Dnipropetrovsk)
14	MF	RUS	Roman Kontsedalov (from (Russia) Energomash Belgorod)
15	DF	RUS	Georgi Zotov (from (Russia) Anzhi Makhachkala)
22	DF	BRA	Apodi (from (Brazil) Chapecoense)
27	DF	BRA	Felipe Santana (from (Germany) Schalke 04)
30	MF	UKR	Ihor Zhurakhovskyi (from (Ukraine) Metalurh Zaporizhya)
57	DF	RUS	Ruslan Khagur
58	DF	RUS	Vladislav Puchkov
61	FW	RUS	Alan Khachirov (from (Russia) Kubanskaya Korona Shevchenko)
67	GK	RUS	Maksim Borisko
69	MF	RUS	Mikhail Babkin
70	MF	RUS	Aleksandr Dzhumayev
74	MF	RUS	Nikita Skuridin
79	GK	RUS	Vladislav Shevchenko (end of loan to (Russia) Biolog-Novokubansk)
81	MF	RUS	Maksim Sidorov
91	GK	MDA	Dmitri Stajila (from (Moldova) Sheriff Tiraspol)
94	GK	RUS	Nalbiy Sidzhakh
97	MF	RUS	Kirill Shekovtsov
98	GK	RUS	Ilya Sotsunov

Out: Note: Flags indicate national team as defined under FIFA eligibility rules; some limited exceptions apply. Players may hold more than one non-FIFA nationality.

No.	Pos.	Nation	Player
8	MF	RUS	Artur Tlisov (contract expired)
10	MF	RUS	Andrey Arshavin (to (Kazakhstan) Kairat)
18	MF	RUS	Vladislav Ignatyev (to (Russia) Lokomotiv Moscow)
25	MF	PAR	Lorenzo Melgarejo (to (Russia) Spartak Moscow)
67	GK	RUS	Nikolai Kostenko
77	MF	RUS	Sergei Tkachyov (contract dissolved due to club's debts, to (Russia) CSKA Moscow as a free agent)
—	FW	URU	Gonzalo Bueno (on loan to (Argentina) Estudiantes, previously on loan to (Portugal) União da Madeira)

== Competitions ==
=== Russian Premier League ===
==== Matches ====
20 July 2015 1	Kuban Krasnodar	0–2	Ural	Krasnodar
20:00 MSK (UTC+3)	Arshavin (yellow card) 57'; Ignatyev (yellow card) 61'	Summary	Dorozhkin (yellow card) 45'; Manucharyan 73'; Acevedo 90+3' (pen.)	Stadium: Kuban Stadium; Attendance: 11,817; Referee: Kirill Levnikov

25 July 2015 2	Terek Grozny	1–1	Kuban Krasnodar	Grozny
21:00 MSK (UTC+3)	Píriz 32'; Adílson (yellow card) 43'; Sadayev (yellow card) 61'	Summary	Rabiu (yellow card) 8' (yellow-red card) 66'; Melgarejo 52' (yellow card) 55'; Ignatyev (yellow card) 80'	Stadium: Akhmat-Arena; Attendance: 12,734; Referee: Igor Fedotov

31 July 2015 3	Kuban Krasnodar	1–1	Ufa	Krasnodar
20:00 MSK (UTC+3)	Ignatyev 35'; Pavlyuchenko (yellow card) 41'	Summary	Igboun 51'; Zaseyev (yellow card) 53'; Sukhov (yellow card) 82'	Stadium: Kuban Stadium; Attendance: 6,548; Referee: Alexey Nikolaev

10 August 2015 4	Krasnodar	1–1	Kuban Krasnodar	Krasnodar
20:15 MSK (UTC+3)	Pereyra (yellow card) 72'; Smolov 90'	Summary	Melgarejo 50'; Tlisov (yellow card) 71'; Šunjić (yellow card) 85'; Armaș (yellow card) 87'	Stadium: Kuban Stadium; Attendance: 25,250; Referee: Vitaly Meshkov

15 August 2015 5	Kuban Krasnodar	0–1	Rubin Kazan	Krasnodar
21:30 MSK (UTC+3)	Arshavin (yellow card) 66'; Rabiu (yellow card) 90+4'	Report	Karadeniz 33'; Nabiullin (yellow card) 88'; Kanunnikov (yellow card) 89'	Stadium: Kuban Stadium; Attendance: 6,729; Referee: Sergey Kostevich

24 August 2015 6	Krylia Sovetov	3–0	Kuban Krasnodar	Samara
19:00 MSK (UTC+3)	Drahun 17', 71'; Kornilenko 47'	Summary	Xandão (yellow card) 19'; Šunjić (yellow card) 66'	Stadium: Metallurg Stadium; Attendance: 14,273; Referee: Sergey Karasev

22 August 2015 7	Kuban Krasnodar	0–1	CSKA Moscow	Krasnodar
20:00 MSK (UTC+3)	Xandão (yellow card) 23'; Armaș (yellow card) 50'	Summary	Eremenko (yellow card) 47'; Milanov (yellow card) 75'; Nababkin 88'; Berezutski (yellow card) 90'; Dzagoev (yellow card) 90'	Stadium: Kuban Stadium; Attendance: 12,211; Referee: Vladimir Moskalyov

12 September 2015 8	Amkar Perm	1–1	Kuban Krasnodar	Perm
16:30 MSK (UTC+3)	Shavayev 58'	Summary	Melgarejo 42'; Khubulov (yellow card) 90+3'	Stadium: Zvezda Stadium; Attendance: 8,275; Referee: Igor Nizovtsev

19 September 2015 9	Kuban Krasnodar	3–0	Spartak Moscow	Krasnodar
19:00 MSK (UTC+3)	Khubulov 9'; Melgarejo 36'; Ignatyev 86'	Report	Glushakov (yellow card) 56'; K. Kombarov (yellow card) 64'; Özbiliz (yellow card) 71'	Stadium: Kuban Stadium; Attendance: 15,213; Referee: Sergey Lapochkin

28 September 2015 10	Rostov	2–1	Kuban Krasnodar	Rostov-on-Don
19:00 MSK (UTC+3)	Poloz 22' (pen.), 51'; Terentyev (yellow card) 54'; Noboa (yellow card) 71'; Azmoun (yellow card) 80'; Navas (yellow card) 81'	Summary	Rabiu (yellow card) 20'; Tkachyov 34'; Manolev (yellow card) 77'; Armaș (yellow card) 80'; Bugayev (yellow card) 81'	Stadium: Olimp-2; Attendance: 14,057; Referee: Sergey Kulikov

3 October 2015 11	Kuban Krasnodar	1–1	Anzhi Makhachkala	Krasnodar
19:30 MSK (UTC+3)	Melgarejo 22'; Baldé (yellow card) 83'	Summary	Mkrtchyan (yellow card) 34'; Haruna (yellow card) 38'; Tagirbekov (yellow card) 52'; Boli 59' (yellow card) 68'	Stadium: Kuban Stadium; Attendance: 7,145; Referee: Aleksei Matyunin

17 October 2015 12	Kuban Krasnodar	2–2	Zenit St. Petersburg	Krasnodar
16:30 MSK (UTC+3)	Xandão 2'; Manolev (yellow card) 29'; Khubulov (yellow card) 31'; Melgarejo 64'	Summary	Neto (yellow card) 35'; Dzyuba 44'; Shatov 54'; Hulk (yellow card) 67'; Yusupov (yellow card) 77'	Stadium: Kuban Stadium; Attendance: 14,427; Referee: Aleksey Eskov

24 October 2015 13	Mordovia Saransk	1–1	Kuban Krasnodar	Saransk
14:30 MSK (UTC+3)	Shitov (yellow card) 21'; Rykov (yellow card) 25'; Shipitsin (yellow card) 29'; Lutsenko 59'; Makhmudov (yellow card) 84'; Le Tallec (yellow card) 90+4'	Summary	Tkachyov (yellow card) 34'; Rabiu (yellow card) 38' (yellow-red card) 66'; Baldé 63'; Tlisov (red card) 73'	Stadium: Start Stadium; Attendance: 3,324; Referee: Sergey Karasev

1 November 2015 14	Kuban Krasnodar	6–2	Lokomotiv Moscow	Krasnodar
19:00 MSK (UTC+3)	Ignatyev 4'; Melgarejo 14', 27'; Armaș 19'; Tkachyov 38'; Shishkin 90+1' (o.g.)	Report	Shishkin (yellow card) 63' Niasse 64'; Kolomeytsev 76'	Stadium: Kuban Stadium; Attendance: 5,611; Referee: Sergey Lapochkin

7 November 2015 15	Dynamo Moscow	2–1	Kuban Krasnodar	Khimki
18:30 MSK (UTC+3)	Hubočan (yellow card) 45+2'; Kozlov 74'; Zobnin 80'; Pogrebnyak (yellow card) 82'; Tashayev (yellow card) 88'	Report	Ignatyev 45+2'; Rabiu (yellow card) 75'; Xandão (yellow card) 82'	Stadium: Arena Khimki; Attendance: 3,623; Referee: Sergey Kulikov

22 November 2015 16	Kuban Krasnodar	2–2	Terek Grozny	Krasnodar
17:00 MSK (UTC+3)	Baldé 6', 30'; Armaș (yellow card) 43'; Bucur (yellow card) 90+2'	Summary	Lebedenko (yellow card) 13' (yellow-red card) 40'; Semyonov (yellow card) 27'; Utsiyev 67'; Rybus 76'	Stadium: Kuban Stadium; Attendance: 5,517; Referee: Alexey Nikolaev

28 November 2015 17	Ufa	2–2	Kuban Krasnodar	Ufa
14:30 YEKT (UTC+5)	Krotov 19'; Paurević 90'	Summary	Ignatyev 12' (yellow card) 79'; Rabiu (yellow card) 29'; Khubulov 39' (yellow card) 56'	Stadium: Neftyanik Stadium; Attendance: 3,605; Referee: Kirill Levnikov

4 December 2015 18	Kuban Krasnodar	2–3	Krasnodar	Krasnodar
19:00 MSK (UTC+3)	Tkachyov 11'; Ignatyev 67'; Melgarejo (yellow card) 69'; Tlisov (yellow card) 77'; Belenov (yellow card) 79'; Bugayev (yellow card) 90'	Summary	Wánderson 71'; Joãozinho (yellow card) 72'; Mamayev 80' (pen.); Smolov 87'; Laborde (yellow card) 88'	Stadium: Kuban Stadium; Attendance: 12,114; Referee: Vladislav Bezborodov

5 March 2016 19	Rubin Kazan	1–0	Kuban Krasnodar	Kazan
17:00 MSK (UTC+3)	Kuzmin (yellow card) 47'; Tkachuk 62'	Report	Rabiu (yellow card) 10'; Xandão (yellow card) 45'	Stadium: Kazan Arena; Attendance: 16,127; Referee: Mikhail Vilkov

11 March 2016 20	Kuban Krasnodar	2–0	Krylia Sovetov Samara	Krasnodar
19:00 MSK (UTC+3)	Kleshchenko (yellow card) 6'; Seleznyov 47' (pen.); Bucur (yellow card) 74'; Karetnik 77'	Summary	Pomerko (yellow card) 37'; Burlak (yellow card) 45+2'; Taranov (yellow card) 73'; Bateau (yellow card) 77'	Stadium: Kuban Stadium; Attendance: 5,010; Referee: Sergey Karasev

19 March 2016 21	CSKA Moscow	2–0	Kuban Krasnodar	Khimki
19:30 MSK (UTC+3)	Wernbloom (yellow card) 16'; Musa 21', 81'	Summary	Apodi (yellow card) 59'; Bucur (yellow card) 64'; Baldé (yellow card) 90+1'; Yakuba (yellow card) 90+1'	Stadium: Arena Khimki; Attendance: 7,100; Referee: Vladimir Moskalyov

2 April 2016 22	Kuban Krasnodar	1–1	Amkar Perm	Krasnodar
17:00 MSK (UTC+3)	Bucur (yellow card) 23'; Seleznyov 41' (pen.)	Summary	Belorukov (yellow card) 32'; Salugin (yellow card) 37'; Ogude (yellow card) 51'; Prudnikov 65'	Stadium: Kuban Stadium; Attendance: 5,926; Referee: Alexey Nikolaev

10 April 2016 23	Spartak Moscow	2–2	Kuban Krasnodar	Moscow
19:30 MSK (UTC+3)	Popov 6'; Promes 51'; Zé Luís (yellow card) 60'	Summary	Apodi 36'; Mayrovich 45'; Xandão (yellow card) 50'; Armaș (yellow card) 53'; Yakuba (yellow card) 56'	Stadium: Otkrytie Arena; Attendance: 21,222; Referee: Sergey Ivanov

17 April 2016 24	Kuban Krasnodar	0–1	Rostov	Krasnodar
19:30 MSK (UTC+3)	Rabiu (yellow card) 19'; Kontsedalov (yellow card) 65'	Summary	Poloz (yellow card) 45'; Gațcan 81'; Mogilevets (yellow card) 90+1'; Kudryashov (yellow card) 90+1'	Stadium: Kuban Stadium; Attendance: 12,755; Referee: Aleksei Matyunin

24 April 2016 25	Anzhi Makhachkala	1–0	Kuban Krasnodar	Kaspiysk
19:30 MSK (UTC+3)	Boli 80' (pen.); Berisha (yellow card) 88'	Summary	Santana (yellow card) 26'; Belenov (red card) 77'; Zotov (yellow card) 84'	Stadium: Anzhi Arena; Attendance: 4,500; Referee: Kirill Levnikov

28 April 2016 26	Zenit St. Petersburg	4–1	Kuban Krasnodar	Saint Petersburg
19:30 MSK (UTC+3)	Shatov 22', 72'; García (yellow card) 30'; Dzyuba 39'; Hulk 65'	Report	Seleznyov 24'; Khubulov (yellow card) 37'	Stadium: Petrovsky Stadium; Attendance: 15,301; Referee: Aleksei Nikolayev

7 May 2016 27	Kuban Krasnodar	1–2	Mordovia Saransk	Krasnodar
17:00 MSK (UTC+3)	Baldé 6'; Mayrovich (yellow card) 30'; Georgiyevsky (yellow card) 83'; Pavlyuchenko (yellow card) 90+3'	Summary	Lutsenko 2'; Makhmudov (yellow card) 33'; Rykov (yellow card) 66'; Ignatovich (yellow card) 78'; Perendija 85' (yellow card) 86'; Revishvili (yellow card) 90'; Stevanović (yellow card) 90+3'	Stadium: Kuban Stadium; Attendance: 6,725; Referee: Sergey Ivanov

11 May 2016 28	Lokomotiv Moscow	0–1	Kuban Krasnodar	Moscow
19:30 MSK (UTC+3)	Ćorluka (yellow card) 78'	Summary	Khubulov (yellow card) 75'; Pavlyuchenko 79' (pen.); Baldé (yellow card) 84'	Stadium: Lokomotiv Stadium; Attendance: 6,082; Referee: Sergey Lapochkin

16 May 2016 29	Kuban Krasnodar	1–0	Dynamo Moscow	Krasnodar
19:30 MSK (UTC+3)	Pavlyuchenko 21'; Khubulov (yellow card) 45+1'	Summary	Drahun (yellow card) 17'; Sosnin (yellow card) 41'; Zobnin (yellow card) 51'; Yeshchenko (yellow card) 60'; Kozlov (red card) 90+5'	Stadium: Kuban Stadium; Attendance: 14,217; Referee: Vladislav Bezborodov

21 May 2016 30	Ural	2–0	Kuban Krasnodar	Yekaterinburg
13:30 MSK (UTC+3)	Gogniyev 31'; Sapeta 64'	Summary	Yakuba (yellow card) 38'	Stadium: SKB-Bank Arena; Attendance: 4,930; Referee: Igor Fedotov

==== Table ====
Pos	Team	Pld	W	D	L	GF	GA	GD	Pts	Qualification or relegation
1	CSKA Moscow (C)	30	20	5	5	51	25	+26	65	Qualification for the Champions League group stage
2	Rostov	30	19	6	5	41	20	+21	63	Qualification for the Champions League third qualifying round
3	Zenit Saint Petersburg	30	17	8	5	61	32	+29	59	Qualification for the Europa League group stage (Note: Zenit Saint Petersburg qualified for the Europa League group stage by winning the 2015–16 Russian Cup.)
4	Krasnodar	30	16	8	6	54	25	+29	56	Qualification for the Europa League third qualifying round
5	Spartak Moscow	30	15	5	10	48	39	+9	50	Qualification for the Europa League third qualifying round
6	Lokomotiv Moscow	30	14	8	8	43	33	+10	50	
7	Terek Grozny	30	11	11	8	35	30	+5	44	
8	Ural Sverdlovsk Oblast	30	10	9	11	39	46	−7	39	
9	Krylia Sovetov Samara	30	9	8	13	19	31	−12	35	
10	Rubin Kazan	30	9	6	15	33	39	−6	33	
11	Amkar Perm	30	7	10	13	22	33	−11	31	
12	Ufa	30	6	9	15	25	44	−19	27	
13	Anzhi Makhachkala (O)	30	6	8	16	28	50	−22	26	Qualification for the Relegation play-offs
14	Kuban Krasnodar (R)	30	5	11	14	34	44	−10	26	Qualification for the Relegation play-offs
15	Dynamo Moscow (R)	30	5	10	15	25	47	−22	25	Relegation to Football National League
16	Mordovia Saransk (R)	30	4	12	14	30	50	−20	24	Relegation to Football National League

Source: Russian Premier League, Soccerway
Rules for classification: 1) Points; 2) Matches won; 3) Head-to-head points; 4) Head-to-head matches won; 5) Head-to-head goal difference; 6) Head-to-head goals scored; 7) Head-to-head away goals; 8) Goal difference; 9) Goals scored; 10) Away goals scored.
(C) Champions; (O) Play-off winners; (R) Relegated

==== Relegation play-offs ====
24 May 2016 1st Leg	Kuban Krasnodar	1–0	Tom Tomsk	Krasnodar
19:45 MSK (UTC+3)	Armaș 19' (pen.); Mayrovich (yellow card) 31'; Manolev (yellow card) 42'; Bucur (yellow card) 90+1'	Summary	Pugin (yellow card) 20'; Bendz (yellow card) 48'; Solosin (yellow card) 79'; Sharipov (yellow card) 89'	Stadium: Kuban Stadium; Attendance: 9,501; Referee: Aleksandr Egorov

27 May 2016 2nd Leg	Tom Tomsk	2–0 (2–1 agg.)	Kuban Krasnodar	Kaspiysk
16:00 MSK (UTC+3)	Bardachow (yellow card) 45'; Bashkirov 57'; Sanaya (yellow card) 60'; Ciupercă 72'; Temnikov (yellow card) 87'; Solosin (yellow card) 90+3'	Summary	Apodi (yellow card) 39'; Belenov (yellow card) 87'; Armaș (yellow card) 90+2'; Bucur (yellow card) 90+3'	Stadium: Anzhi Arena; Attendance: 9,500; Referee: Vitaly Meshkov

=== Russian Cup ===
23 September 2015 Round of 32	Shinnik Yaroslavl	1–2	Kuban Krasnodar	Yaroslavl
18:30 MSK (UTC+3)	Plătică 90'	Summary	Nurisov 50'; Volchkov 85' (yellow card) 86'	Stadium: Shinnik Stadium; Attendance: 4,100; Referee: Timur Arslanbekov

28 October 2015 Round of 16	Kuban Krasnodar	1–0	Spartak Moscow	Krasnodar
19:30 MSK (UTC+3)	Melgarejo 34'; Khubulov (yellow card) 76'; Belenov (yellow card) 85'; Rabiu (yellow card) 88'	Summary	D.Kombarov (yellow card) 55'; Bakayev (yellow card) 79'; Zuyev (yellow card) 84'	Stadium: Kuban Stadium; Attendance: 7,791; Referee: Sergey Ivanov

28 February 2016 Quarterfinal	Zenit St.Petersburg	1–0 (a.e.t.)	Kuban Krasnodar	Saint Petersburg
20:00 MSK (UTC+3)	Hulk (yellow card) 62'; Maurício 104'	Summary	Seleznyov (yellow card) 5'; Kontsedalov (yellow card) 56'; Santana (yellow card) 77'; Rabiu (yellow card) 82'; Xandão (yellow card) 85'	Stadium: Petrovsky Stadium; Attendance: 17,646; Referee: Aleksei Eskov

== Squad statistics ==
As of Match played 16 May 2016

=== Appearances and goals ===
No.	Pos	Nat	Player	Total		Premier League		Playoffs		Russian Cup	
No.	Pos	Nat	Player	Apps	Goals	Apps	Goals	Apps	Goals	Apps	Goals
1	GK	(Russia) RUS	Yevgeni Frolov	1	0	0	0	0	0	1	0
2	DF	(Moldova) MDA	Igor Armaș	28	2	24+1	1	2	1	1	0
4	DF	(Brazil) BRA	Xandão	30	0	27	0	2	0	1	0
5	MF	(Ghana) GHA	Mohammed Rabiu	22	0	20	0	0	0	2	0
7	MF	(Russia) RUS	Vladislav Kulik	16	0	14+2	0	0	0	0	0
9	FW	(Russia) RUS	Roman Pavlyuchenko	10	2	4+6	2	0	0	0	0
10	FW	(Ukraine) UKR	Yevhen Seleznyov	10	0	9	0	0	0	1	0
11	FW	(Romania) ROU	Gheorghe Bucur	16	0	8+5	0	0+2	0	1	0
14	MF	(Russia) RUS	Roman Kontsedalov	8	0	2+5	0	0	0	1	0
15	DF	(Russia) RUS	Georgi Zotov	15	0	12	0	2	0	1	0
16	DF	(Bulgaria) BUL	Stanislav Manolev	18	0	12+3	0	2	0	1	0
17	MF	(Russia) RUS	Svyatoslav Georgiyevsky	8	0	3+1	0	0+2	0	2	0
20	MF	(Ukraine) UKR	Sergey Karetnik	15	0	6+6	0	0	0	2+1	0
21	DF	(Russia) RUS	Vladimir Lobkaryov	13	0	4+6	0	2	0	0+1	0
22	DF	(Brazil) BRA	Apodi	15	0	12	0	2	0	1	0
23	GK	(Russia) RUS	Aleksandr Belenov	33	0	29	0	2	0	2	0
27	DF	(Brazil) BRA	Felipe Santana	12	0	9	0	2	0	1	0
30	MF	(Ukraine) UKR	Ihor Zhurakhovskyi	2	0	0+2	0	0	0	0	0
31	MF	(Russia) RUS	Yuri Zavezyon	1	0	0	0	0	0	0+1	0
43	DF	(Russia) RUS	Roman Bugayev	24	0	21	0	2	0	1	0
46	MF	(Russia) RUS	Yuri Zhuravlyov	1	0	0	0	0	0	1	0
62	FW	(Russia) RUS	Ilya Stefanovich	1	0	0	0	0	0	1	0
65	DF	(Russia) RUS	Ruslan Dzhamalutdinov	1	0	0	0	0	0	1	0
68	DF	(Russia) RUS	Aleksei Ivanushkin	1	0	0	0	0	0	0+1	0
72	MF	(Russia) RUS	Igor Konovalov	4	0	0+3	0	0	0	1	0
73	MF	(Russia) RUS	Denis Yakuba	17	0	12+1	0	2	0	2	0
78	MF	(Russia) RUS	Arsen Khubulov	27	0	18+8	0	0	0	1	0
83	FW	(Russia) RUS	Maksim Mayrovich	15	1	6+6	1	2	0	0+1	0
84	MF	(Russia) RUS	Aleksandr Kleshchenko	7	0	2+3	0	0	0	2	0
86	MF	(Russia) RUS	Kirill Volchkov	1	1	0	0	0	0	0+1	1
89	MF	(Russia) RUS	Vladislav Tyufyakov	1	0	0	0	0	0	1	0
90	MF	(Russia) RUS	Ilmir Nurisov	1	1	0	0	0	0	1	1
91	GK	(Moldova) MDA	Dmitri Stajila	2	0	1+1	0	0	0	0	0
99	FW	(Senegal) SEN	Ibrahima Baldé	23	4	10+11	4	0	0	1+1	0
Players who left Kuban Krasnodar on loan:
Players who left Kuban Krasnodar during the season:
8	MF	(Russia) RUS	Artur Tlisov	15	0	9+5	0	0	0	0+1	0
10	MF	(Russia) RUS	Andrey Arshavin	9	0	4+4	0	0	0	0+1	0
14	GK	(Bosnia and Herzegovina) BIH	Toni Šunjić	6	0	6	0	0	0	0	0
18	MF	(Russia) RUS	Vladislav Ignatyev	17	0	17	0	0	0	0	0
25	FW	(Paraguay) PAR	Lorenzo Melgarejo	17	1	14+2	0	0	0	1	1
77	MF	(Russia) RUS	Sergei Tkachyov	17	0	15+1	0	0	0	1	0

=== Goal scorers ===
Place	Position	Nation	Number	Name	Premier League	Playoffs	Russian Cup	Total
1	MF	(Paraguay)	25	Lorenzo Melgarejo	8	0	1	9
2	MF	(Russia)	18	Vladislav Ignatyev	6	0	0	6
3	FW	(Senegal)	99	Ibrahima Baldé	4	0	0	4
4	MF	(Russia)	77	Sergei Tkachyov	3	0	0	3
5	FW	(Russia)	78	Arsen Khubulov	2	0	0	2
5	FW	(Ukraine)	10	Yevhen Seleznyov	2	0	0	2
5	FW	(Russia)	9	Roman Pavlyuchenko	2	0	0	2
5	DF	(Moldova)	2	Igor Armaș	1	1	0	1
9	DF	(Brazil)	22	Apodi	1	0	0	1
9	FW	(Russia)	83	Maksim Mayrovich	1	0	0	1
9	MF	(Ukraine)	20	Sergey Karetnik	0	1	0	1
9	DF	(Brazil)	4	Xandão	0	1	0	1
9	MF	(Russia)	90	Ilmir Nurisov	0	1	0	1
9	MF	(Russia)	86	Kirill Volchkov	0	1	0	1
9				Own goal	1	0	0	1
				TOTALS	33	3	1	37

=== Disciplinary record ===
Number	Nation	Position	Name	Russian Premier League		Playoffs		Russian Cup		Total	
Number	Nation	Position	Name	Yellow card	Red card	Yellow card	Red card	Yellow card	Red card	Yellow card	Red card
2	(Moldova)	DF	Igor Armaș	5	0	0	0	0	0	5	0
4	(Brazil)	DF	Xandão	5	0	0	0	1	0	6	0
5	(Ghana)	MF	Mohammed Rabiu	10	2	0	0	2	0	12	2
8	(Russia)	MF	Artur Tlisov	2	1	0	0	0	0	2	1
9	(Russia)	FW	Roman Pavlyuchenko	2	0	0	0	0	0	2	0
10	(Russia)	MF	Andrey Arshavin	2	0	0	0	0	0	2	0
10	(Ukraine)	FW	Yevhen Seleznyov	0	0	0	0	1	0	1	0
11	(Romania)	FW	Gheorghe Bucur	4	0	1	0	0	0	5	0
14	(Bosnia and Herzegovina)	DF	Toni Šunjić	2	0	0	0	0	0	2	0
14	(Russia)	MF	Roman Kontsedalov	1	0	0	0	1	0	2	0
15	(Russia)	DF	Georgi Zotov	1	0	0	0	0	0	1	0
16	(Bulgaria)	DF	Stanislav Manolev	2	0	1	0	0	0	3	0
17	(Russia)	MF	Svyatoslav Georgiyevsky	1	0	0	0	0	0	1	0
18	(Russia)	MF	Vladislav Ignatyev	3	0	0	0	0	0	3	0
22	(Brazil)	DF	Apodi	1	0	0	0	0	0	1	0
23	(Russia)	GK	Aleksandr Belenov	1	1	0	0	1	0	2	1
25	(Paraguay)	MF	Lorenzo Melgarejo	2	0	0	0	0	0	2	0
27	(Brazil)	DF	Felipe Santana	1	0	0	0	1	0	2	0
43	(Russia)	DF	Roman Bugayev	2	0	0	0	0	0	2	0
73	(Russia)	MF	Denis Yakuba	3	0	0	0	0	0	3	0
77	(Russia)	MF	Sergei Tkachyov	1	0	0	0	0	0	1	0
78	(Russia)	FW	Arsen Khubulov	6	0	0	0	1	0	7	0
83	(Russia)	FW	Maksim Mayrovich	1	0	1	0	0	0	2	0
84	(Russia)	MF	Aleksandr Kleshchenko	1	0	0	0	0	0	1	0
86	(Russia)	MF	Kirill Volchkov	0	0	0	0	1	0	1	0
99	(Senegal)	FW	Ibrahima Baldé	3	0	0	0	0	0	3	0
			TOTALS	62	4	7	0	9	0	78	4
