= List of Russian football transfers winter 2015–16 =

This is a list of Russian football transfers in the winter transfer window 2015–16 by club. Only clubs of the 2015–16 Russian Premier League are included.

== Russian Premier League 2015–16 ==
=== Amkar Perm ===
In: Note: Flags indicate national team as defined under FIFA eligibility rules; some limited exceptions apply. Players may hold more than one non-FIFA nationality.

No.	Pos.	Nation	Player
10	FW	NGA	Bright Dike (from (Canada) Toronto)
13	MF	RUS	Roland Gigolayev (from (Poland) Ruch Chorzów)
17	MF	RUS	David Dzakhov (free agent)
78	MF	RUS	Artyom Filippov (from Chertanovo Moscow)
80	MF	RUS	Andrei Trunin
99	MF	UKR	Oleh Mishchenko (from (Ukraine) Vorskla Poltava)
—	MF	RUS	David Khurtsidze (from Torpedo Armavir, the contract starts in July)

Out: Note: Flags indicate national team as defined under FIFA eligibility rules; some limited exceptions apply. Players may hold more than one non-FIFA nationality.

No.	Pos.	Nation	Player
40	MF	RUS	Ivan Belikov (on loan to Lokomotiv Liski)
43	MF	NGA	Izunna Uzochukwu (to (Denmark) OB)
44	MF	RUS	Aleksei Orlov
50	DF	ARM	Robert Arzumanyan (on loan to (Kazakhstan) Shakhter Karagandy)

=== Anzhi Makhachkala ===
In: Note: Flags indicate national team as defined under FIFA eligibility rules; some limited exceptions apply. Players may hold more than one non-FIFA nationality.

No.	Pos.	Nation	Player
1	GK	RUS	David Yurchenko (on loan from Ufa)
14	MF	KOS	Bernard Berisha (from (Albania) Skënderbeu Korçë)
25	DF	GHA	Jonathan Mensah (from (France) Evian)

Out: Note: Flags indicate national team as defined under FIFA eligibility rules; some limited exceptions apply. Players may hold more than one non-FIFA nationality.

No.	Pos.	Nation	Player
2	DF	RUS	Andrey Yeshchenko (on loan to Dynamo Moscow)
7	DF	RUS	Kamil Agalarov (released)
9	FW	POR	Hugo Almeida (to (Germany) Hannover 96)
10	MF	NGA	Lukman Haruna (end of loan from (Ukraine) Dynamo Kyiv)
13	DF	RUS	Rasim Tagirbekov (released)
15	DF	RUS	Georgi Zotov (to Kuban Krasnodar)
28	FW	RUS	Serder Serderov (to (Bulgaria) Slavia Sofia)
33	GK	RUS	Sergei Pesyakov (end of loan from Spartak Moscow)
42	MF	BRA	Leonardo (released)

=== CSKA Moscow ===
In: Note: Flags indicate national team as defined under FIFA eligibility rules; some limited exceptions apply. Players may hold more than one non-FIFA nationality.

No.	Pos.	Nation	Player
11	FW	SWE	Carlos Strandberg (end of loan to Ural Sverdlovsk Oblast)
15	MF	RUS	Roman Shirokov (from Spartak Moscow)
17	MF	RUS	Sergei Tkachyov (from Kuban Krasnodar)
41	DF	RUS	Danil Neplyuyev
47	MF	RUS	Anatoli Anisimov (from Rubin Kazan academy)
82	MF	RUS	Ivan Oleynikov
95	GK	RUS	Maksim Yedapin (from own academy)
99	FW	NGA	Aaron Samuel Olanare (on loan from (China) Guangzhou R&F)

Out: Note: Flags indicate national team as defined under FIFA eligibility rules; some limited exceptions apply. Players may hold more than one non-FIFA nationality.

No.	Pos.	Nation	Player
11	FW	SWE	Carlos Strandberg (on loan to (Sweden) AIK)
23	MF	BUL	Georgi Milanov (on loan to (Switzerland) Grasshoppers)
43	FW	RUS	Aleksandr Makarov (on loan to Baltika Kaliningrad)
46	FW	RUS	Nikolai Dergachyov (on loan to Dolgoprudny)
58	DF	RUS	Anatolie Nikolaesh (to (Portugal) Leiria)
65	FW	RUS	Mikhail Solovyov (to Solyaris Moscow)
67	MF	RUS	Denis Glukhov (to Dynamo Kirov)
68	FW	RUS	Nikita Kasatkin (to Syzran-2003)
74	MF	RUS	Savva Knyazev
76	DF	RUS	Kirill Sarayev (to Dynamo Kirov)
88	FW	CIV	Seydou Doumbia (end of loan from (Italy) Roma)
91	DF	RUS	Nikita Chernov (on loan to Baltika Kaliningrad)

=== Dynamo Moscow ===
In: Note: Flags indicate national team as defined under FIFA eligibility rules; some limited exceptions apply. Players may hold more than one non-FIFA nationality.

No.	Pos.	Nation	Player
3	DF	SWE	Sebastian Holmén (from (Sweden) IF Elfsborg)
7	MF	BLR	Stanislaw Drahun (from Krylia Sovetov Samara)
21	FW	MNE	Fatos Bećiraj (from (Belarus) Dinamo Minsk)
38	DF	RUS	Andrey Yeshchenko (on loan from Anzhi Makhachkala)
51	DF	RUS	Roman Yevgenyev
52	DF	RUS	Ilya Panin
54	MF	RUS	Ilya Gomanyuk
55	FW	RUS	Kirill Burykin
56	MF	RUS	Viktor Demyanov
57	MF	RUS	Denis Sedykh
58	FW	RUS	Semyon Belyakov
82	GK	RUS	David Sangare

Out: Note: Flags indicate national team as defined under FIFA eligibility rules; some limited exceptions apply. Players may hold more than one non-FIFA nationality.

No.	Pos.	Nation	Player
3	DF	NED	Alexander Büttner (on loan to (Belgium) Anderlecht)
9	FW	RUS	Aleksandr Kokorin (to Zenit St. Petersburg)
18	MF	RUS	Yuri Zhirkov (to Zenit St. Petersburg)
33	DF	RUS	Andrius Rukas
65	MF	RUS	Daniil Yamshchikov
79	MF	RUS	Aleksandr Morgunov (to Krasnodar)
82	MF	RUS	Guram Adzhoyev (to Arsenal Tula)
99	FW	RUS	Aleksandr Maksimenko (on loan to Avangard Kursk)

=== Krasnodar ===
In: Note: Flags indicate national team as defined under FIFA eligibility rules; some limited exceptions apply. Players may hold more than one non-FIFA nationality.

No.	Pos.	Nation	Player
1	GK	RUS	Stanislav Kritsyuk (on loan from (Portugal) Braga)
11	MF	RUS	Vyacheslav Podberyozkin (from Ural Sverdlovsk Oblast)
38	MF	CIV	Kouassi Eboue (from Krasnodar-3)
40	FW	RUS	Alan Koroyev
42	DF	RUS	Mikhail Tikhonov
49	FW	RUS	Alim Makoyev
54	MF	RUS	Roman Kurazhov
60	FW	RUS	Nikita Sergeyev
64	MF	RUS	Aleksandr Morgunov (from Dynamo Moscow)
67	MF	RUS	Andrei Tekuchyov
76	FW	RUS	Ruslan Rzayev

Out: Note: Flags indicate national team as defined under FIFA eligibility rules; some limited exceptions apply. Players may hold more than one non-FIFA nationality.

No.	Pos.	Nation	Player
5	DF	POL	Artur Jędrzejczyk (on loan to (Poland) Legia Warsaw)
40	DF	AZE	Elgun Ulukhanov (to (Azerbaijan) Qarabağ)
49	FW	RUS	Dmitri Bakay (to Biolog-Novokubansk)
54	MF	RUS	Vyacheslav Yakimov
61	GK	RUS	Dmitri Goryachkin (to Dolgoprudny)
67	MF	RUS	Yaroslav Komarov
76	FW	RUS	Abdulmuslim Asilderov
77	GK	RUS	Anton Kochenkov (end of loan from Lokomotiv Moscow)

=== Krylia Sovetov Samara ===
In: Note: Flags indicate national team as defined under FIFA eligibility rules; some limited exceptions apply. Players may hold more than one non-FIFA nationality.

No.	Pos.	Nation	Player
29	FW	BEL	Gianni Bruno (on loan from (France) Evian)
93	MF	RUS	Vitali Kalenkovich (from Baltika Kaliningrad)
—	MF	RUS	Serob Grigoryan (end of loan to Zenit Penza)

Out: Note: Flags indicate national team as defined under FIFA eligibility rules; some limited exceptions apply. Players may hold more than one non-FIFA nationality.

No.	Pos.	Nation	Player
2	MF	BLR	Stanislaw Drahun (to Dynamo Moscow)
32	FW	CHI	Nicolás Canales (to (Azerbaijan) Neftchi Baku)
39	FW	RUS	Nikita Podyachev
77	MF	RUS	Igor Gorbatenko (on loan to Arsenal Tula)

=== Kuban Krasnodar ===
In: Note: Flags indicate national team as defined under FIFA eligibility rules; some limited exceptions apply. Players may hold more than one non-FIFA nationality.

No.	Pos.	Nation	Player
10	FW	UKR	Yevhen Seleznyov (from (Ukraine) Dnipro Dnipropetrovsk)
14	MF	RUS	Roman Kontsedalov (from Energomash Belgorod)
15	DF	RUS	Georgi Zotov (from Anzhi Makhachkala)
22	DF	BRA	Apodi (from (Brazil) Chapecoense)
27	DF	BRA	Felipe Santana (from (Germany) Schalke 04)
30	MF	UKR	Ihor Zhurakhovskyi (from (Ukraine) Metalurh Zaporizhya)
57	DF	RUS	Ruslan Khagur
58	DF	RUS	Vladislav Puchkov
61	FW	RUS	Alan Khachirov (from Kubanskaya Korona Shevchenko)
67	GK	RUS	Maksim Borisko
69	MF	RUS	Mikhail Babkin
70	MF	RUS	Aleksandr Dzhumayev
74	MF	RUS	Nikita Skuridin
79	GK	RUS	Vladislav Shevchenko (end of loan to Biolog-Novokubansk)
81	MF	RUS	Maksim Sidorov
91	GK	MDA	Dmitri Stajila (from (Moldova) Sheriff Tiraspol)
94	GK	RUS	Nalbiy Sidzhakh
97	MF	RUS	Kirill Shekovtsov
98	GK	RUS	Ilya Sotsunov

Out: Note: Flags indicate national team as defined under FIFA eligibility rules; some limited exceptions apply. Players may hold more than one non-FIFA nationality.

No.	Pos.	Nation	Player
8	MF	RUS	Artur Tlisov (contract expired)
10	MF	RUS	Andrey Arshavin (to (Kazakhstan) Kairat)
18	MF	RUS	Vladislav Ignatyev (to Lokomotiv Moscow)
25	MF	PAR	Lorenzo Melgarejo (to Spartak Moscow)
67	GK	RUS	Nikolai Kostenko
77	MF	RUS	Sergei Tkachyov (contract dissolved due to club's debts, to CSKA Moscow as a free agent)
—	FW	URU	Gonzalo Bueno (on loan to (Argentina) Estudiantes, previously on loan to (Portugal) União da Madeira)

=== Lokomotiv Moscow ===
In: Note: Flags indicate national team as defined under FIFA eligibility rules; some limited exceptions apply. Players may hold more than one non-FIFA nationality.

No.	Pos.	Nation	Player
20	MF	RUS	Vladislav Ignatyev (from Kuban Krasnodar)
37	GK	RUS	Anton Shitov
42	DF	RUS	Ivan Lapshov (from own academy)
44	DF	RUS	Aleksandr Vulfov
45	FW	NGA	Ezekiel Henty (from (Slovenia) Olimpija Ljubljana)
46	MF	RUS	Pavel Patsekin
62	MF	RUS	Artyom Antoshkin
67	FW	RUS	Roman Tugarev (from own academy)
69	MF	RUS	Daniil Kulikov
71	DF	RUS	Aleksandr Razoryonov
77	GK	RUS	Anton Kochenkov (end of loan to Krasnodar)
79	FW	RUS	Maksim Chikanchi
86	FW	RUS	Ivan Sharov (from own academy)
87	DF	RUS	Nikita Zhyoltikov

Out: Note: Flags indicate national team as defined under FIFA eligibility rules; some limited exceptions apply. Players may hold more than one non-FIFA nationality.

No.	Pos.	Nation	Player
11	MF	MAR	Mbark Boussoufa (on loan to (Belgium) Gent)
21	FW	SEN	Oumar Niasse (to (England) Everton)
52	MF	RUS	Sergei Makarov (on loan to (Belarus) Minsk)
60	MF	RUS	Anton Miranchuk (on loan to (Estonia) Levadia Tallinn)
64	FW	RUS	Aleksandr Smirnov (to Dolgoprudny)
93	MF	RUS	Andrei Mostovoy (to Dolgoprudny)
99	DF	RUS	Aleksei Solovyov (to Zenit Penza)
—	DF	RUS	Aleksandr Logunov (to Rostov, previously on loan to Baltika Kaliningrad)
—	FW	RUS	Dmitri Sychev (contract expired, previously on loan to (Kazakhstan) Okzhetpes)

=== Mordovia Saransk ===
In: Note: Flags indicate national team as defined under FIFA eligibility rules; some limited exceptions apply. Players may hold more than one non-FIFA nationality.

No.	Pos.	Nation	Player
13	FW	RUS	Mikhail Markin (end of loan to Tyumen)

Out: Note: Flags indicate national team as defined under FIFA eligibility rules; some limited exceptions apply. Players may hold more than one non-FIFA nationality.

No.	Pos.	Nation	Player
7	MF	FRA	Damien Le Tallec (to (Serbia) Red Star Belgrade)
11	FW	RUS	Dmitri Sysuyev (to Ufa)
20	FW	POR	Yannick Djaló (end of loan from (Portugal) Benfica)

=== Rostov ===
In: Note: Flags indicate national team as defined under FIFA eligibility rules; some limited exceptions apply. Players may hold more than one non-FIFA nationality.

No.	Pos.	Nation	Player
1	GK	KAZ	Stas Pokatilov (from (Kazakhstan) Aktobe)
6	MF	IRN	Saeid Ezatolahi (from (Spain) Atlético Madrid)
30	DF	RUS	Fyodor Kudryashov (from Terek Grozny)
32	FW	GEO	Nika Kacharava (from (Georgia (country)) Tskhinvali)
49	MF	RUS	Dmitri Tananeyev (from own academy)
56	MF	RUS	Artyom Sobol (from SKA Rostov-on-Don)
60	MF	RUS	Aleksei Neskoromny
63	DF	RUS	Aleksandr Logunov (from Lokomotiv Moscow)
71	MF	RUS	Dmitri Veber (from SKA Rostov-on-Don)
77	GK	RUS	Nikita Medvedev (from Zenit-Izhevsk Izhevsk)
80	MF	RUS	Dzhambulat Dulayev (free agent)
81	MF	RUS	Roman Khodunov (from SKA Rostov-on-Don)
83	MF	RUS	Ilya Zakharov (from SKA Rostov-on-Don)
89	MF	RUS	Aleksandr Yerokhin (from Ural Sverdlovsk Oblast)

Out: Note: Flags indicate national team as defined under FIFA eligibility rules; some limited exceptions apply. Players may hold more than one non-FIFA nationality.

No.	Pos.	Nation	Player
5	DF	CRC	Felicio Brown Forbes (to Arsenal Tula)
—	MF	RUS	Nika Chkhapeliya (to Tosno, previously on loan to Baltika Kaliningrad)

=== Rubin Kazan ===
In: Note: Flags indicate national team as defined under FIFA eligibility rules; some limited exceptions apply. Players may hold more than one non-FIFA nationality.

No.	Pos.	Nation	Player
13	DF	SWE	Emil Bergström (from (Sweden) Djurgården)
19	FW	RUS	Mikhail Yakovlev
20	MF	CRO	Mijo Caktaš (from (Croatia) Hajduk Split)
25	MF	UZB	Bobir Davlatov (end of loan to (Kazakhstan) Zhetysu)
28	MF	RUS	Mikhail Petrolay (end of loan to (Kazakhstan) Zhetysu)
31	MF	RUS	Denis Tkachuk (from Zenit St. Petersburg)
54	MF	RUS	Erik Vasilyev (from Neftekhimik Nizhnekamsk)
79	DF	UKR	Andriy Pylyavskyi (from (Ukraine) Zorya Luhansk)
87	FW	RUS	Artur Alukayev
90	FW	RUS	Ilya Gilyazutdinov

Out: Note: Flags indicate national team as defined under FIFA eligibility rules; some limited exceptions apply. Players may hold more than one non-FIFA nationality.

No.	Pos.	Nation	Player
4	DF	URU	Mauricio Lemos (on loan to (Spain) Las Palmas, previously from (Uruguay) Defensor Sporting, previously on loan from Defensor)
9	FW	RUS	Ramil Sheydayev (end of loan from Zenit St. Petersburg)
12	GK	RUS	Aleksandr Filtsov (on loan to Arsenal Tula)
13	GK	IRN	Alireza Haghighi (to (Portugal) Marítimo)
24	MF	RUS	Ilsur Samigullin (on loan to Neftekhimik Nizhnekamsk, previously on loan to (Kazakhstan) Zhetysu)
33	DF	RUS	Inal Getigezhev (on loan to Gazovik Orenburg)
54	FW	RUS	Shakhrom Sulaymonov (released)
59	DF	RUS	Aydar Khabibullin (on loan to Neftekhimik Nizhnekamsk)
89	GK	RUS	Anatoli Malashenko (on loan to Neftekhimik Nizhnekamsk)
93	MF	RUS	Albert Sharipov (on loan to Tom Tomsk)

=== Spartak Moscow ===
In: Note: Flags indicate national team as defined under FIFA eligibility rules; some limited exceptions apply. Players may hold more than one non-FIFA nationality.

No.	Pos.	Nation	Player
25	MF	PAR	Lorenzo Melgarejo (from Kuban Krasnodar)
30	GK	RUS	Sergei Pesyakov (end of loan to Anzhi Makhachkala)
31	GK	RUS	Fyodor Arsentyev
35	DF	RUS	Leonid Mironov (from own academy)
42	MF	RUS	Denis Patsev (from own academy)
43	MF	RUS	Pyotr Volodkin (from own academy)
54	DF	RUS	Ilya Ivanov (from own academy)
57	MF	RUS	Kirill Orekhov (from own academy)
58	GK	RUS	Aleksei Kozlov
61	DF	RUS	Kirill Feofilaktov (from own academy)
68	DF	RUS	Daniil Petrunin (from own academy)
74	MF	RUS	Nikita Kiselyov (from own academy)
82	MF	RUS	Ilya Mazurov (from own academy)
87	MF	RUS	Soltmurad Bakayev (from own academy)

Out: Note: Flags indicate national team as defined under FIFA eligibility rules; some limited exceptions apply. Players may hold more than one non-FIFA nationality.

No.	Pos.	Nation	Player
1	GK	RUS	Anton Mitryushkin (to (Switzerland) Sion)
9	FW	RUS	Denis Davydov (on loan to (Czech Republic) FK Mladá Boleslav)
10	FW	ARM	Yura Movsisyan (on loan to (United States) Real Salt Lake)
11	MF	ARM	Aras Özbiliz (to (Turkey) Beşiktaş)
15	MF	RUS	Roman Shirokov (to CSKA Moscow)
31	GK	RUS	Ilya Sukhoruchenko (to Torpedo Armavir)
33	MF	RUS	Vladimir Zubarev (to Ufa)
35	DF	GER	Serdar Tasci (on loan to (Germany) Bayern Munich)
43	FW	RUS	Daniil Makeyev (to Khimki-M)
74	DF	RUS	Valentin Vinnichenko (to Torpedo Armavir)
—	MF	ARG	Tino Costa (on loan to (Italy) Fiorentina, previously on loan to (Italy) Genoa)

=== Terek Grozny ===
In: Note: Flags indicate national team as defined under FIFA eligibility rules; some limited exceptions apply. Players may hold more than one non-FIFA nationality.

No.	Pos.	Nation	Player
4	DF	FIN	Juhani Ojala (end of loan to (Finland) HJK)
5	DF	RUS	Zaurbek Pliyev (from (Kazakhstan) Kairat)
8	MF	BRA	Pedro Ken (from (Brazil) Cruzeiro)
13	DF	IRN	Milad Mohammadi (from (Iran) Rah Ahan Yazdan)
29	DF	AUS	Luke Wilkshire (free agent, last at (Netherlands) Feyenoord)
38	DF	RUS	Imran Alsultanov
53	MF	RUS	Bilal Umarov
76	DF	RUS	Arsen Adamov
91	FW	RUS	Idris Umayev

Out: Note: Flags indicate national team as defined under FIFA eligibility rules; some limited exceptions apply. Players may hold more than one non-FIFA nationality.

No.	Pos.	Nation	Player
8	MF	BRA	Maurício (to Zenit St. Petersburg)
10	MF	RUS	Adlan Katsayev (on loan to SKA-Energiya Khabarovsk)
13	DF	RUS	Fyodor Kudryashov (to Rostov)
36	DF	RUS	Magomed Adayev
38	MF	RUS	Ibragim Titayev
41	FW	RUS	Khalim Yunusov (to Terek-2 Grozny)
42	MF	RUS	Aslan Tokhosashvili
43	DF	RUS	Islam Davletukayev
53	DF	RUS	Ali Bamatgeriyev
82	FW	RUS	Viskhazh Israilov
90	DF	RUS	Sheykh-Magomed Tagirov
91	MF	RUS	Rakhman Momuyev

=== Ufa ===
In: Note: Flags indicate national team as defined under FIFA eligibility rules; some limited exceptions apply. Players may hold more than one non-FIFA nationality.

No.	Pos.	Nation	Player
31	FW	RUS	Dmitri Sysuyev (from Mordovia Saransk)
47	MF	RUS	Artyom Yegorov
51	MF	RUS	Mark Krivorog (from own academy)
54	GK	RUS	Yegor Pozdnyakov
55	MF	RUS	Artur Sitdikov (from Akademiya Ufa)
60	MF	RUS	Vladimir Zubarev (from Spartak Moscow)
69	DF	RUS	Nikita Popov
75	DF	RUS	Ilya Ponomaryov
77	FW	RUS	Denis Zizenkov (from UOR #5 Yegoryevsk)
79	MF	RUS	Al-Khan Samba (from Sterlitamak)
80	MF	RUS	Dmitri Belozyorov
88	GK	RUS	Giorgi Shelia (from Yenisey Krasnoyarsk)
92	DF	RUS	Vyacheslav Dyomin
98	DF	RUS	Igor Diveyev
99	FW	RUS	Danila Yemelyanov

Out: Note: Flags indicate national team as defined under FIFA eligibility rules; some limited exceptions apply. Players may hold more than one non-FIFA nationality.

No.	Pos.	Nation	Player
1	GK	RUS	David Yurchenko (on loan to Anzhi Makhachkala)
5	MF	GHA	Emmanuel Frimpong (released)
14	MF	RUS	Maksim Semakin (on loan to Luch-Energiya Vladivostok)
22	MF	UZB	Vagiz Galiulin (to Tosno)
48	DF	RUS	Vyacheslav Morozov
50	MF	RUS	Sergei Tamrazov
51	GK	RUS	Artur Rozyev
74	DF	RUS	Dmitri Pavlov
75	FW	RUS	Almaz Salmanov
78	FW	RUS	Aleksandr Ponomaryov
79	MF	RUS	Vadim Solovey
80	MF	RUS	Andranik Mnatsakanyan
81	DF	BLR	Dzmitry Verkhawtsow (to (Poland) Korona Kielce)
82	MF	RUS	Rinat Kireyev
84	MF	RUS	Maksim Molchanov
85	DF	RUS	Erik Salikhov
89	MF	RUS	Kirill Panchikhin
95	MF	RUS	Sergei Krechetov
96	MF	RUS	Arsen Benifand
97	MF	RUS	Andrei Stepanov

=== Ural Sverdlovsk Oblast ===
In: Note: Flags indicate national team as defined under FIFA eligibility rules; some limited exceptions apply. Players may hold more than one non-FIFA nationality.

No.	Pos.	Nation	Player
22	DF	RUS	Kirill Kochnev
28	GK	RUS	Nikolai Zabolotny (not registered with the league previously)
31	MF	RUS	Vladislav Blinov
33	DF	RUS	Mikhail Merkulov (end of loan to Baikal Irkutsk)
40	DF	RUS	Maksim Gorin
38	FW	RUS	Aleksei Gontsa
54	MF	RUS	Aleksandr Ryazantsev (on loan from Zenit St. Petersburg)
55	DF	RUS	Pavel Vlasenko
71	FW	AZE	Elbeyi Guliyev (end of loan to (Kazakhstan) Zhetysu)
73	FW	RUS	Konstantin Reshetnikov
88	MF	RUS	Dmitri Korobov (from Fakel Voronezh)
—	DF	SRB	Dominik Dinga (from (Serbia) Vojvodina)

Out: Note: Flags indicate national team as defined under FIFA eligibility rules; some limited exceptions apply. Players may hold more than one non-FIFA nationality.

No.	Pos.	Nation	Player
5	DF	RUS	Ivan Knyazev (to (Latvia) Riga)
14	MF	RUS	Vyacheslav Podberyozkin (to Krasnodar)
24	DF	RUS	Denis Fomin (on loan to Tekstilshchik Ivanovo)
25	MF	RUS	Igor Lambarschi (to Volga-Olimpiyets Nizhny Novgorod)
32	MF	RUS	Andrei Gorbanets (to Arsenal Tula)
89	MF	RUS	Aleksandr Yerokhin (to Rostov)
98	FW	SWE	Carlos Strandberg (end of loan from CSKA Moscow)
—	DF	RUS	Aleksei Gerasimov (to Volga-Olimpiyets Nizhny Novgorod, previously on loan to (Kazakhstan) Zhetysu)

=== Zenit Saint Petersburg ===
In: Note: Flags indicate national team as defined under FIFA eligibility rules; some limited exceptions apply. Players may hold more than one non-FIFA nationality.

No.	Pos.	Nation	Player
8	MF	BRA	Maurício (from Terek Grozny)
9	FW	RUS	Aleksandr Kokorin (from Dynamo Moscow)
23	DF	RUS	Yevgeni Chernov (from Tom Tomsk)
26	DF	SRB	Vukašin Jovanović (from (Serbia) Red Star Belgrade)
30	MF	RUS	Nikita Salamatov (from Vityaz Podolsk)
31	GK	RUS	Mikhail Ponomarenko
35	DF	RUS	David Mildzikhov (from Baikal Irkutsk)
38	MF	RUS	Leon Musayev
40	MF	RUS	Yuri Bavin (from (Portugal) Leiria)
53	DF	RUS	Mikhail Slashchyov
81	MF	RUS	Yuri Zhirkov (from Dynamo Moscow)
82	MF	RUS	Ilya Ivanov
85	FW	RUS	Yuri Kozlov
90	FW	RUS	Ramil Sheydayev (end of loan to Rubin Kazan)

Out: Note: Flags indicate national team as defined under FIFA eligibility rules; some limited exceptions apply. Players may hold more than one non-FIFA nationality.

No.	Pos.	Nation	Player
5	MF	RUS	Aleksandr Ryazantsev (on loan to Ural Sverdlovsk Oblast)
11	FW	RUS	Aleksandr Kerzhakov (on loan to (Switzerland) FC Zürich)
31	MF	RUS	Denis Tkachuk (to Rubin Kazan)
53	DF	RUS	Ivan Ivanidi
64	DF	RUS	Nikita Novopashin (to (Estonia) Paide Linnameeskond)
79	MF	RUS	Konstantin Troyanov
81	GK	RUS	Andrei Strozhevskiy
82	MF	RUS	Igor Drykov
85	GK	RUS	Yaroslav Burychenkov
86	GK	RUS	Sergei Lazarev (to Tosno-M)
89	FW	RUS	Yevgeni Markov (to Tosno)
99	MF	RUS	Ivan Solovyov (on loan to (Finland) Lahti)
