= 2024–25 FC Rotor Volgograd season =

FC Rotor Volgograd
2024–25 season
- Manager: Denis Boyarintsev
- Stadium: Volgograd Arena
- Russian First League: 6th
- Russian Cup: Pre-season
- Highest home attendance: 19,109 vs Torpedo Moscow

The 2024–25 season is the 96th season in the history of FC Rotor Volgograd, and the club's first season back in the Russian First League. In addition to the domestic league, the team is scheduled to participate in the Russian Cup.

== Friendlies ==
28 June 2024 Friendly	Rotor Volgograd (Russia)	2–0	(Russia) Volga Ulyanovsk

3 July 2024 Friendly	Irtysh Omsk (Russia)	0–2	(Russia) Rotor Volgograd

13 February 2025 Friendly	Sochi (Russia)	–	(Russia) Rotor Volgograd

18 February 2025 Friendly	Dynamo Makhachkala (Russia)	–	(Russia) Rotor Volgograd

== Competitions ==
=== Overall record ===
Competition	First match	Last match	Starting round	Record							
Competition	First match	Last match	Starting round	Pld	W	D	L	GF	GA	GD	Win %
Russian First League	14 July 2024		Matchday 1	5	2	1	2	3	3	+0	40.00
Russian Cup				0	0	0	0	0	0	+0	—
Total				5	2	1	2	3	3	+0	40.00

Last updated: 11 August 2024
Source: Soccerway

=== Russian First League ===
==== League table ====
Pos	Team	Pld	W	D	L	GF	GA	GD	Pts
7	Rodina Moscow	34	13	11	10	41	31	+10	50
8	Yenisey Krasnoyarsk	34	14	7	13	36	39	−3	49
9	Rotor Volgograd	34	11	14	9	32	26	+6	47
10	Arsenal Tula	34	8	17	9	25	30	−5	41
11	KAMAZ Naberezhnye Chelny	34	10	8	16	31	35	−4	38 (Note: Ranked on head-to-head points (KAMAZ 6, Neftekhimik 5, Chayka 4))

Source: Soccerway
Rules for classification: 1) Points; 2) Head-to-head points; 3) Head-to-head matches won; 4) Head-to-head goal difference; 5) Head-to-head goals scored; 6) Head-to-head away goals scored; 7) Matches won; 8) Goal difference; 9) Goals scored; 10) Away matches won; 11) Away goals scored; 12) Best disciplinary record (3 points for red card, 1 point for yellow card); 13) Drawing lots. If teams tied on points did not play an equal number of head-to-head games, head-to-head criteria and disciplinary record are not used for positioning. If 1st- and 2nd-placed teams are tied in the final standings on the first 12 criteria, a winner is determined in an additional play-off game, with no extra time and a penalty-shootout if tied at the end of regulation, instead of drawing lots.

==== Results summary ====
Overall								Home						Away					
Pld	W	D	L	GF	GA	GD	Pts	W	D	L	GF	GA	GD	W	D	L	GF	GA	GD
21	7	9	5	18	16	+2	30	3	6	2	9	7	+2	4	3	3	9	9	0

Last updated: 1 December 2024.
Source: soccerway

==== Results by round ====
Round	1	2	3	4	5	6	7	8	9	10	11	12	13	14	15	16	17	18	19	20	21	22
Ground	A	H	H	A	A	H	A	H	A	A	H	H	A	H	H	A	A	H	A	H	H	H
Result	W	D	L	L	W	W	D	D	D	D	L	D	W	D	W	L	L	D	W	W	D	
Position	5	6	8	11	11	4	5	7	8	7	10	11	7	8	7	7	9	10	8	7	7	

Updated to match(es) played on 1 December 2024. Source:
A = Away; H = Home; W = Win; D = Draw; L = Loss

==== Matches ====
The tentative match schedule was released on 27 June.

14 July 2024 1	Shinnik Yaroslavl	0–1	Rotor Volgograd	Yaroslavl
16:00 UTC+3			Prishchepa 14'	Stadium: Shinnik Stadium; Attendance: 2,682; Referee: Inal Tanashev

22 July 2024 2	Rotor Volgograd	1–1	Torpedo Moscow	Volgograd
18:00 UTC+3	Bolotov 66'		Gorbunov 18'	Stadium: Volgograd Arena; Attendance: 19,109; Referee: Ranel Ziyakov

29 July 2024 3	Rotor Volgograd	0–1	Arsenal Tula	Volgograd
20:30 UTC+3			Razdorskikh 90'	Stadium: Volgograd Arena; Referee: Roman Galimov

4 August 2024 4	Neftekhimik Nizhnekamsk	1–0	Rotor Volgograd	Nizhnekamsk
18:00 UTC+3	Dzhamilov 3'			Stadium: Neftekhimik Stadium; Attendance: 1,872; Referee: Vera Opeykina

11 August 2024 5	Tyumen	0–1	Rotor Volgograd	Tyumen
16:00		Report	Prishchepa 3'; Tyurin (yellow card) 19'; Timur Kasimov (yellow card) 74'; Semyonov (yellow card) 90+4'	Stadium: Geolog Stadium; Attendance: 4,100; Referee: (Russia) Igor Zakharov

16 August 2024 6	Rotor Volgograd	2–0	Baltika	Volgograd
20:30	Nikita Plotnikov (yellow card) 37'; Shumskikh 40'; Bolotov (yellow card) 46'; Mikhail Maltsev (red card) 48'; Kukharchuk 89'; Gleb Shilnikov (yellow card) 90+1'	Report	Avanesyan (yellow card) 24'; Saus (yellow card) 90'; Stefanovich (yellow card) 90+3'	Stadium: Volgograd Arena; Attendance: 22,118; Referee: (Russia) Artur Fedorov

26 August 2024 7	Rodina Moscow	2–2	Rotor Volgograd	Moscow
20:30	Yushin 45'; Dmitry Shadrintsev 49'; Kleshchenko (yellow card) 82'	Report	Damir Talikin 5'; Ageyev (yellow card) 32'; Prishchepa (yellow card) 45+1' (goal) 83'; Shumskikh (yellow card) 53'; Zavezyon (yellow card) 90+1'	Stadium: Spartak Moscow Academy Stadium; Attendance: 1,459; Referee: (Russia) Vera Opeykina

2 September 2024 8	Rotor Volgograd	0–0	Chayka	Volgograd
20:30	Prishchepa (yellow card) 58'; Shvyatsow (yellow card) 71'	Report	Khokhlachyov (yellow card) 75'; Nesterov (yellow card) 88'	Stadium: Volgograd Arena; Attendance: 20,502; Referee: (Russia) Konstantin Averyanov

7 September 2024 9	Ural	1–1	Rotor Volgograd	Yekaterinburg
12:30	Sungatulin (yellow card) 90+1'; Begić (yellow card) 90+1' (yellow-red card) 90+3'; Sekulić 90+3'	Report	Mikhail Maltsev (yellow card) 54'; Vladislav Morozov 63'; Kukharchuk (yellow card) 90+1'	Stadium: Central Stadium; Attendance: 10,142; Referee: (Russia) Yuriy Karpov

14 September 2024 10	Sochi	0–0	Rotor Volgograd	Sochi
20:00		Report	Prishchepa (yellow card) 65'	Stadium: Fisht Olympic Stadium; Attendance: 4,377; Referee: (Russia) Anton Frolov

20 September 2024 11	Rotor Volgograd	1–2	Chernomorets	Volgograd
20:30	Semyonov 45+3'; Nikita Plotnikov (yellow card) 60'	Report	Stezhko 38'; Krotov (yellow card) 57'; Uridia 82'; Frolkin (yellow card) 90+5'	Stadium: Volgograd Arena; Attendance: 18,463; Referee: (Russia) Igor Zakharov

30 September 2024 12	Rotor Volgograd	0–0	Alania Vladikavkaz	Volgograd
20:30	Shumskikh (yellow card) 76'; Semyonov (yellow card) 89'; Prishchepa (yellow card) 90+1'; Bolotov (yellow card) 90+2'	Report	Butayev (yellow card) 90+1'	Stadium: Volgograd Arena; Attendance: 15,407; Referee: (Russia) Ranel Ziyakov

7 October 2024 13	Sokol Saratov	0–1	Rotor Volgograd	Saratov
20:45	Sasin (yellow card) 65'; Samko (yellow card) 90+2'	Report	Mikhail Maltsev 27'; Timur Kasimov (yellow card) 33'	Stadium: Lokomotiv Stadium; Attendance: 3,670; Referee: (Russia) Evgeniy Galimov

13 October 2024 14	Rotor Volgograd	1–1	SKA-Khabarovsk	Volgograd
18:00	Mikhail Maltsev 29'; Nikita Plotnikov (yellow card) 60'; Ivan Pyatkin (yellow card) 90+8'	Report	Artyom Bykov 32'; Simonyan (yellow card) 60'	Stadium: Volgograd Arena; Attendance: 15,369; Referee: (Russia) Anton Anopa

19 October 2024 15	Rotor Volgograd	1–0	KAMAZ	Volgograd
18:00	Lavrishchev 87'	Report	Gorelov (yellow card) 77'; Lauk (yellow card) 90'	Stadium: Volgograd Arena; Attendance: 10,712; Referee: (Russia) Inal Tanashev

27 October 2024 16	Ufa	2–0	Rotor Volgograd	Ufa
13:00	Gurenko (yellow card) 67'; Andrey Anisimov 85'; Lozhkin 90'	Report	Mikhail Maltsev (yellow card) 53'; Pliyev (yellow card) 72'	Stadium: BetBoom Arena; Attendance: 1,080; Referee: (Russia) Aleksey Lapatukhin

2 November 2024 17	Yenisey	2–0	Rotor Volgograd	Krasnoyarsk
14:00	Maslovsky 53'; Lomakin 90+3'	Report		Stadium: Central Stadium; Attendance: 2,793; Referee: (Russia) German Kovalenko

8 November 2024 18	Rotor Volgograd	1–1	Sochi	Volgograd
19:00	Semyonov (yellow card) 21'; Timur Kasimov 78' (yellow card) 78'; Shumskikh (yellow card) 79'	Report	Maslov (yellow card) 7'; Kirill Nikitin (yellow card) 33' (goal) 35'; Litvinov (yellow card) 90'	Stadium: Volgograd Arena; Attendance: 9,726; Referee: (Russia) Aleksandr Mashlyakevich

16 November 2024 19	Alania Vladikavkaz	1–3	Rotor Volgograd	Grozny
15:00	Butayev (yellow card) 7'; Tatayev (red card) 89'; Bagayev 90+2'	Report	Timur Kasimov 11'; Lavrishchev 17'; Mikhail Maltsev 34'	Stadium: Sultan Bilimkhanov Stadium; Attendance: 523; Referee: (Russia) Konstantin Averyanov

24 November 2024 20	Rotor Volgograd	1–0	Neftekhimik	Volgograd
15:00	Bolotov (yellow card) 20'; Timur Kasimov 22'	Report	Denisov (yellow card) 28'	Stadium: Volgograd Arena; Attendance: 8,684; Referee: (Russia) Vladimir Falov

1 December 2024 21	Rotor Volgograd	1–1	Shinnik	Volgograd
15:00	Lavrishchev 30' (yellow card) 53'; Igor Sokolov (yellow card) 41'; Zavezyon (yellow card) 72'	Report	Fyodorov 58'	Stadium: Volgograd Arena; Attendance: 11,059; Referee: (Russia) Evgeniy Galimov

3 March 2025 22	Rotor Volgograd	–	Ural	Volgograd
19:30				Stadium: Volgograd Arena

=== Russian Cup ===
24 September 2024 Round Four	Volga Ulyanovsk	1–1 (4–3 p)	Rotor Volgograd	Ulyanovsk
20:30	Kamenshchikov 26'	Report	Ageyev 56'	Stadium: Trud Stadium; Attendance: 2,455; Referee: (Russia) Yaroslav Khromey
