= Tyufyakov =

Tyufyakov is a surname. Notable people with the surname include:

- Mikhail Tyufyakov (born 1974), Russian footballer
- Vladislav Tyufyakov (born 1996), Russian footballer
