= PFC Dynamo Stavropol =

Russian football club

Dynamo
- Full name: Professional Football Club; Dynamo Stavropol
- Founded: 1933
- Ground: Dynamo Stadium
- Capacity: 15,589
- Chairman: Anatoly Dyomin
- Manager: Ashamaz Shakov
- League: Russian Second League, Division A, Silver Group
- 2026–27: First stage: 5th
- Website: dynamostavropol.ru
Home colours	Away colours

PFC Dynamo Stavropol (Russian: «Динамо» (Ставрополь)) is an association football club from Stavropol, south Russia, best known for winning the 1949 RSFSR championship in one of the 9 zones. In recent years it played mostly in Russian Second League, the third league in the national hierarchy. Due to severe financial difficulties, Dynamo missed the opportunity to be promoted to the First Division in 2005. After that, it was formally liquidated two times and resurrected again as an amateur team, eventually redeeming the professional status. As of the season 2013–14, the team played in the amateur championship of Stavropol krai under the name Dynamo UOR. A separate club was renamed FC Dynamo GTS Stavropol for the 2014–15 season in the Russian Professional Football League. Before the 2015–16 season, FC Dynamo GTS was renamed FC Dynamo Stavropol.

== History ==
The club's most significant victory was achieved in 1949, when it earned the title of Champion of Russia.

From 1957 to 2004, Dynamo played in various leagues of the Soviet Union and Russia.

In 1957, it was called FC Trudovye Rezervy Stavropol and from 1958 to 1961 it was called FC Spartak Stavropol.

In 1980–1981 and 1985–1991, Dynamo played in the USSR First League. The best result was a 4th position in 1989.

In 1991 they lost to Burnley in a record 10–0 defeat, with Burnley goalkeeper Ian Walsh saving 3 penalties in the space of six minutes.

In 1992, Dynamo were entitled to play in the Russian Top League and finished 15th. Dynamo's 12th position in 1993 is their best ever result in professional football. In 1994, Dynamo finished 15th and were relegated from the Top Division.

From 1995 to 1999, Dynamo played in the Russian First Division. The best position achieved was 5th in 1996.

From 2000 to 2004, Dynamo played in the South Zone of Russian Second Division and won the tournament in 2004, thus earning promotion to the First Division. Dynamo also won the Professional Football League Cup, a competition between zonal tournament winners, and became the champions of the Second Division.

In January 2005, the club was denied professional license due to financial difficulties and relegated to the Amateur Football League.

Since 2006, club has been playing in Russian Second Division again. It finished 2nd in 2007 season. It experienced financial difficulties in 2009 and did not play in the Second Division. Dynamo's license was taken over by FC Stavropolye-2009. 6 players from the 2008 Dynamo roster transferred to FC Stavropol for the 2009 season and 5 transferred to FC Stavropolye-2009. The club was resurrected in 2010, taking over another Stavropol team, FC Stavropolye-2009, and existed as a professional team until 2012.

A separate club was renamed FC Dynamo GTS Stavropol for the 2014–15 season in the Russian Professional Football League. Before the 2015–16 season, FC Dynamo GTS was renamed FC Dynamo Stavropol.

== Current squad ==
As of 11 September 2026, according to the Second League website.

Note: Flags indicate national team as defined under FIFA eligibility rules; some limited exceptions apply. Players may hold more than one non-FIFA nationality.

No.	Pos.	Nation	Player
1	GK	RUS	Vadim Guskov
2	DF	RUS	Magomednabi Yagyayev
4	MF	RUS	Vadim Tskhadiashvili
6	DF	RUS	Murat Yshyk
11	MF	RUS	Murad Alimov
12	GK	RUS	Ilya Ganyuk
13	GK	RUS	Maksim Matyusha
17	MF	RUS	Anar Panayev
18	DF	RUS	Rinat Garayev
19	DF	RUS	Vladislav Rymar
20	MF	RUS	Rodislav Trefilov
22	DF	RUS	Yanis Grigoryan
23	DF	RUS	Gennady Shulga

No.	Pos.	Nation	Player
26	MF	RUS	Dmitri Kratkov
27	MF	RUS	Arkady Gyulushanyan
32	DF	RUS	Artyom Karasyov
33	MF	RUS	Artur Barsegyan
47	MF	RUS	Telman Musayev
48	MF	RUS	Danila Shilov
70	MF	RUS	Amir Dzhumayev
73	DF	RUS	Leonid Bogachev
86	MF	RUS	Nikita Kashtan
88	DF	RUS	Artur Byazrov (on loan from Alania Vladikavkaz)
93	FW	RUS	Bilal Akhyadov
99	FW	RUS	Denis Rubanov

== Reserve squad ==
Dynamo's reserve squad played professionally as FC Dynamo-d Stavropol from 1994 to 1997 in the Russian Third League.

== Notable players ==
Had international caps for their respective countries. Players whose name is listed in bold represented their countries while playing for Dynamo.

- (Soviet Union) Aleksandr Novikov
- (Soviet Union) Yuri Pudyshev
- (Russia) Albert Borzenkov
- (Russia) Viktor Bulatov
- (Russia) (Azerbaijan) Vladislav Lemish
- (Russia) Nikolai Olenikov
- (Russia) Kirill Panchenko
- (Russia) Roman Pavlyuchenko
- (Russia) Sergei Podpaly
- (Russia) Vladislav Ternavski
- (Armenia) Karapet Mikaelyan
- (Azerbaijan) Rasim Abuşev
- (Azerbaijan) Igor Getman
- (Azerbaijan) Gurban Gurbanov
- (Azerbaijan) Vyaçeslav Lıçkin
- (Belarus) Vladimir Sheleg
- (Belarus) Alyaksandr Vyazhevich
- (Kazakhstan) Aleksandr Bogatyryov
- (Kazakhstan) Renat Dubinskiy
- (Tajikistan) Vitaliy Levchenko
- (Turkmenistan) Aleksandr Ignatow
- (Ukraine) Oleksiy Antyukhyn
- (Ukraine) Yuriy Hrytsyna

== See also ==
- Dynamo FC
