= Yevgeni Bolotov =

Russian footballer

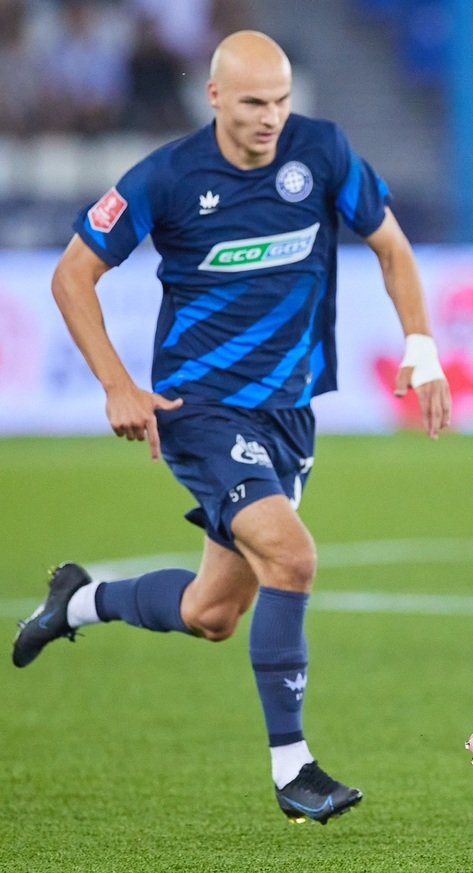
- Bolotov with Orenburg in 2025

Personal information
- Full name: Yevgeni Ruslanovich Bolotov
- Date of birth: 4 June 2001 (age 25)
- Place of birth: Orenburg, Russia
- Height: 1.82 m (6 ft 0 in)
- Position: Midfielder

Team information
- Current team: Orenburg
- Number: 57

Youth career
- 2008–2018: Orenburg

Senior career*
Years	Team	Apps	(Gls)
2018–2024	Orenburg	4	(0)
2020–2021	→ Orenburg-2	20	(4)
2022	→ Forte Taganrog (loan)	11	(0)
2022–2024	→ Tyumen (loan)	46	(4)
2024–2025	Rotor Volgograd	31	(1)
2025–	Orenburg	39	(3)
- * Club domestic league appearances and goals as of 21 November 2026

Yevgeni Ruslanovich Bolotov (Russian: Евгений Русланович Болотов; born 4 June 2001) is a Russian football player who plays for Orenburg.

== Club career ==
He made his debut for the main squad of Orenburg on 25 September 2018 in a Russian Cup game against Dynamo Barnaul. He made his Russian Football National League debut for Orenburg on 12 August 2020 in a game against Alania Vladikavkaz.

On 19 June 2023, Bolotov's loan to Tyumen was extended for the 2023–24 season.

On 25 June 2024, Bolotov signed with Rotor Volgograd.

Bolotov returned to Orenburg on 5 July 2025. He made his Russian Premier League debut for Orenburg on 21 July 2025 against CSKA Moscow.

== Career statistics ==
As of 21 November 2026

Club	Season	League			Cup		Total	
Club	Season	Division	Apps	Goals	Apps	Goals	Apps	Goals
Orenburg	2018–19	Russian Premier League	0	0	1	0	1	0
Orenburg	2019–20	Russian Premier League	0	0	0	0	0	0
Orenburg	2020–21	Russian First League	3	0	2	0	5	0
Orenburg	2021–22	Russian First League	1	0	1	0	2	0
Orenburg	Total		4	0	4	0	8	0
Orenburg-2	2020–21	Russian Second League	12	2	–		12	2
Orenburg-2	2021–22	Russian Second League	8	2	–		8	2
Orenburg-2	Total		20	4	0	0	20	4
Forte Taganrog (loan)	2021–22	Russian Second League	11	0	–		11	0
Tyumen (loan)	2022–23	Russian Second League	21	3	2	0	23	3
Tyumen (loan)	2023–24	Russian First League	25	1	1	0	26	1
Tyumen (loan)	Total		46	4	3	0	49	4
Rotor Volgograd	2024–25	Russian First League	31	1	1	0	32	1
Orenburg	2025–26	Russian Premier League	25	3	7	0	32	3
Orenburg	2026–27	Russian Premier League	14	0	2	0	16	0
Orenburg	Total		39	3	9	0	48	3
Orenburg	Club total		43	3	13	0	56	3
Career total			151	12	17	0	168	12
