= Nikolay Moskalenko =

Russian footballer

Personal information
- Full name: Nikolay Leonidovich Moskalenko
- Date of birth: 3 January 1990 (age 36)
- Place of birth: Krasnodar, Russian SFSR
- Height: 1.83 m (6 ft 0 in)
- Position: Goalkeeper

Senior career*
Years	Team	Apps	(Gls)
2008–2012	FC Krasnodar	6	(0)
2010–2012	→ FC Druzhba Maykop (loan)	25	(0)
2013–2014	FC Torpedo Armavir	34	(0)
2016–2018	FC Kuban-2 Krasnodar	41	(0)
2016–2018	FC Kuban Krasnodar	1	(0)
2018–2019	FC Urozhay Krasnodar	12	(0)
2019	FC Kuban-Holding Pavlovskaya (amateur)		
2020	FC Forte Taganrog (amateur)		
2020–2025	FC Forte Taganrog	66	(0)
- * Club domestic league appearances and goals as of 15 June 2025

Nikolay Leonidovich Moskalenko (Russian: Никола́й Леони́дович Москале́нко; born 3 January 1990) is a Russian professional association football player.

== Club career ==
He made his debut for the main squad of FC Kuban Krasnodar on 24 August 2016 in a Russian Cup game against FC Energomash Belgorod.

In 2020, Moskalenko joined FC Forte Taganrog.
