= Ilmir Nurisov =

Russian footballer

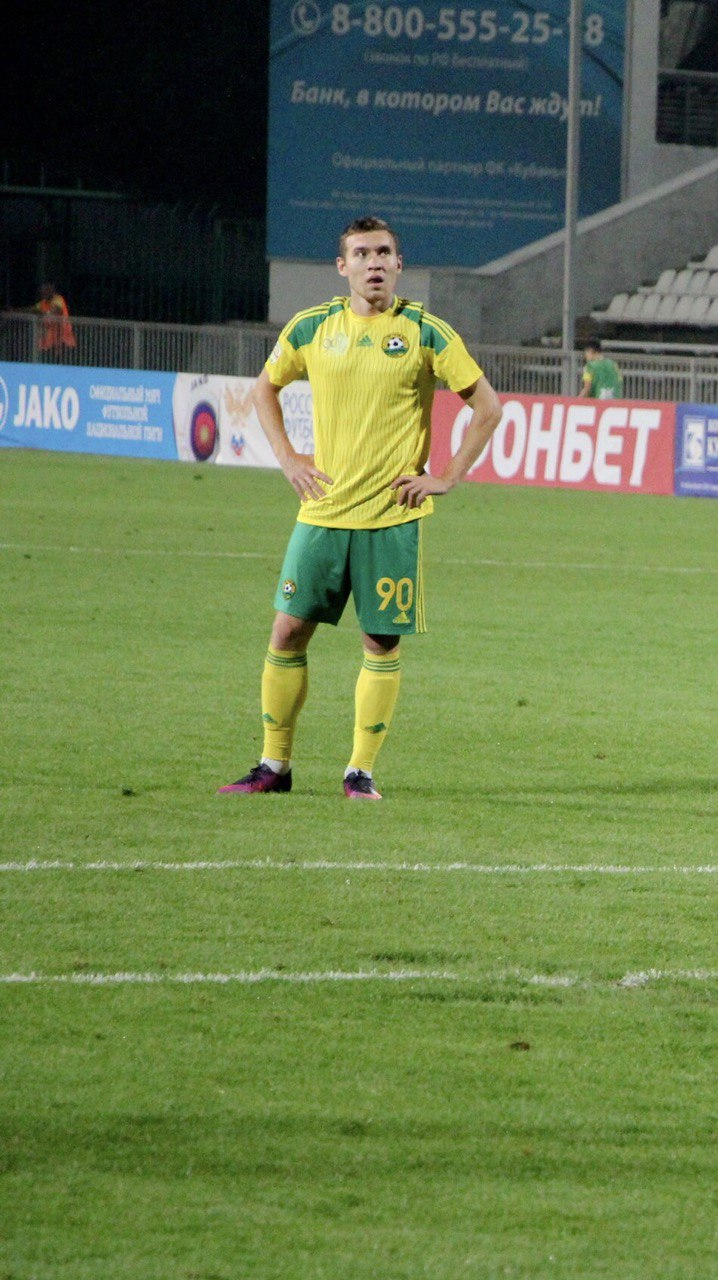

Personal information
- Full name: Ilmir Ilnurovich Nurisov
- Date of birth: 5 August 1996 (age 30)
- Place of birth: Naberezhnye Chelny, Russia
- Height: 1.80 m (5 ft 11 in)
- Position: Midfielder

Youth career
- Chertanovo Education Center

Senior career*
| Years | Team | Apps | (Gls) |
| 2013–2018 | Kuban Krasnodar | 30 | (0) |
| 2016–2018 | → Kuban-2 Krasnodar | 21 | (5) |
| 2018 | Urozhay Krasnodar | 9 | (3) |
| 2019 | Vitebsk | 9 | (0) |
| 2021–2022 | Neftekhimik Nizhnekamsk | 3 | (0) |
| 2022–2023 | Zenit Penza | 9 | (1) |
| 2024 | Mendeleyevsk (amateur) | | |

International career
| 2011 | Russia U-15 | 1 | (0) |
| 2012–2013 | Russia U-17 | 10 | (1) |
| 2014 | Russia U-18 | 4 | (0) |
| 2015 | Russia U-19 | 3 | (0) |
- * Club domestic league appearances and goals

Ilmir Ilnurovich Nurisov (Russian: Ильмир Ильнурович Нурисов; born 5 August 1996) is a Russian former football player.

== Club career ==
He made his debut for the main squad of FC Kuban Krasnodar on 23 September 2015 in a Russian Cup game against FC Shinnik Yaroslavl and scored his team's first goal as it won 2–1. He made his Russian Football National League for FC Kuban Krasnodar on 8 October 2016 against FC Dynamo Moscow.

== International ==
He participated in the 2013 FIFA U-17 World Cup with the Russia national under-17 football team and in the 2015 UEFA European Under-19 Championship with Russia national under-19 football team, the Russia came in second in the latter.
