= Maksim Matyusha =

Russian footballer

Personal information
- Full name: Maksim Sergeyevich Matyusha
- Date of birth: 4 February 1995 (age 31)
- Place of birth: Krasnoselskoye, Russia
- Height: 1.90 m (6 ft 3 in)
- Position: Goalkeeper

Team information
- Current team: Dynamo Stavropol
- Number: 13

Youth career
- SDYuSShOR KK 5 Krasnoselskoye

Senior career*
Years	Team	Apps	(Gls)
2014–2015	Vityaz Krymsk	15	(0)
2015–2016	Chernomorets Novorossiysk	9	(0)
2016–2020	Armavir	52	(0)
2020–2021	Shinnik Yaroslavl	19	(0)
2021–2024	Metallurg Lipetsk	47	(0)
2024–2025	Dynamo Stavropol	27	(0)
2025–2026	Chernomorets Novorossiysk	13	(0)
2026–	Dynamo Stavropol	6	(0)
- * Club domestic league appearances and goals as of 17 October 2026

Maksim Sergeyevich Matyusha (Russian: Максим Сергеевич Матюша; born 4 February 1995) is a Russian football player who plays for Dynamo Stavropol.

== Club career ==
He made his professional debut in the Russian Professional Football League for Vityaz Krymsk on 20 August 2014 in a game against Biolog-Novokubansk.

He made his Russian Football National League debut for Armavir on 17 July 2018 in a game against SKA-Khabarovsk.
