= Kirill Volchkov =

Russian footballer

Personal information
- Full name: Kirill Andreyevich Volchkov
- Date of birth: 21 March 1996 (age 30)
- Place of birth: Smolensk, Russian SFSR
- Height: 1.79 m (5 ft 10 in)
- Position: Midfielder

Senior career*
Years	Team	Apps	(Gls)
2013–2017	Kuban Krasnodar	0	(0)
2016–2018	Kuban-2 Krasnodar	52	(0)
2018	Lori	2	(0)
2019–2020	SpVgg Vreden		
2020	Biolog-Novokubansk	1	(0)
2020–2021	Krasny	23	(2)
2021	Smolensk	0	(0)
2021–2023	Ryazan	46	(0)
- * Club domestic league appearances and goals as of 12 November 2023

Kirill Andreyevich Volchkov (Russian: Кирилл Андреевич Волчков; born 21 March 1996) is a Russian football player.

== Club career ==
He made his debut for the main squad of FC Kuban Krasnodar on 23 September 2015 in a Russian Cup game against FC Shinnik Yaroslavl. He came on as a substitute in the 77th minute and scored a winning goal in the 85th minute as Kuban advanced to the Round of 16.

=== Lori ===
On 3 August 2018, Volchkov signed for newly promoted Armenian Premier League club Lori FC on a contract until the end of the year. On 31, October 2018, Volchkov left Lori by mutual consent.

=== SpVgg Vreden ===
Ahead of the 2019–20 season, Volchkov joined German club SpVgg Vreden.
