= Dmitry Prishchepa =

Belarusian footballer

Personal information
- Full name: Dmitry Sergeyevich Prishchepa
- Date of birth: 21 June 2001 (age 25)
- Place of birth: Minsk, Belarus
- Height: 1.84 m (6 ft 0 in)
- Position: Left back

Team information
- Current team: Ural Yekaterinburg
- Number: 35

Youth career
- 2013–2018: Minsk

Senior career*
Years	Team	Apps	(Gls)
2018–2020	Minsk	36	(0)
2019	→ Zenit Saint Petersburg (loan)	0	(0)
2021–2023	Krylia Sovetov Samara	4	(0)
2021	→ Krylia Sovetov-2 Samara	5	(0)
2022	→ Veles Moscow (loan)	30	(1)
2023	→ Rotor Volgograd (loan)	10	(0)
2023–2025	Rotor Volgograd	52	(4)
2025–	Ural Yekaterinburg	4	(0)

International career^{‡}
2017	Belarus U17	3	(0)
2019	Belarus U19	3	(1)
2020–2022	Belarus U21	14	(0)
2024–	Belarus	5	(0)
- * Club domestic league appearances and goals as of 16 May 2026 ‡ National team caps and goals as of 5 June 2025

Dmitry Sergeyevich Prishchepa (Belarusian: Дзмітрый Сяргеевіч Прышчэпа; Russian: Дмитрий Сергеевич Прищепа; born 21 June 2001) is a Belarusian football player who plays as a left back for Russian club Ural Yekaterinburg and the Belarus national team. He also played as centre back in the past.

== Club career ==
In 2019 he was loaned to Zenit Saint Petersburg, where he played for the reserve squad.

On 18 February 2022, Prishchepa was loaned to Russian Football National League side Veles Moscow for a term of one year. On 25 January 2023, he moved on a new loan to Rotor Volgograd.

On 5 June 2023, Prishchepa moved to Rotor on a permanent basis.

== Career statistics ==
As of 11 December 2021

Club	Season	League			Cup		Continental		Total	
Club	Season	Division	Apps	Goals	Apps	Goals	Apps	Goals	Apps	Goals
Minsk	2018	BPL	1	0	1	0	–		2	0
Minsk	2019	BPL	13	0	2	0	–		15	0
Minsk	2020	BPL	22	0	0	0	–		22	0
Minsk	Total		36	0	3	0	0	0	39	0
Zenit-2 Saint Petersburg (loan)	2019–20	PFL	0	0	–		–		0	0
Krylia Sovetov Samara	2020–21	FNL	4	0	0	0	–		4	0
Krylia Sovetov Samara	2021–22	RPL	0	0	0	0	–		0	0
Krylia Sovetov Samara	Total		4	0	0	0	0	0	4	0
Krylia Sovetov-2 Samara	2020–21	PFL	5	0	–		–		5	0
Career total			87	1	0	0	0	0	87	1
