= Igor Ponomaryov (footballer, born 1996) =

Russian footballer

Personal information
- Full name: Igor Aleksandrovich Ponomaryov
- Date of birth: 27 June 1996 (age 30)
- Height: 1.76 m (5 ft 9 in)
- Position: Defender

Senior career*
Years	Team	Apps	(Gls)
2014–2018	FC Kuban Krasnodar	17	(0)
2016–2018	FC Kuban-2 Krasnodar	30	(2)
2018–2019	FC Urozhay Krasnodar	23	(1)
2019–2020	FC Armavir	5	(0)
2020	FC SKA Rostov-on-Don	5	(0)
2021	FC Noah Jūrmala	12	(0)
2022	FC Metallurg Vidnoye	9	(0)
- * Club domestic league appearances and goals

Igor Aleksandrovich Ponomaryov (Russian: Игорь Александрович Пономарёв; born 27 June 1996) is a Russian former footballer.

== Club career ==
He made his debut in the Russian Professional Football League for FC Kuban-2 Krasnodar on 28 July 2016 in a game against FC Spartak Vladikavkaz.

He made his debut for the main squad of FC Kuban Krasnodar on 24 August 2016 in a Russian Cup game against FC Energomash Belgorod.

He made his Russian Football National League debut for Kuban on 19 March 2017 in a game against FC Mordovia Saransk.
