= Daniil Marugin =

Russian footballer

Personal information
- Full name: Daniil Aleksandrovich Marugin
- Date of birth: 3 August 1998 (age 28)
- Place of birth: Fastovetskaya, Russia
- Height: 1.90 m (6 ft 3 in)
- Position: Defender

Team information
- Current team: Tekstilshchik Ivanovo
- Number: 3

Youth career
- 2015–2016: Kuban Krasnodar

Senior career*
| Years | Team | Apps | (Gls) |
| 2016–2018 | Kuban Krasnodar | 0 | (0) |
| 2016–2018 | Kuban-2 Krasnodar | 38 | (1) |
| 2018 | Kubanskaya Korona Shevchenko | | |
| 2019–2020 | Smolensk (amateur) | | |
| 2020–2022 | Murom | 42 | (3) |
| 2022–2023 | Tver | 10 | (1) |
| 2023 | Tyumen | 10 | (1) |
| 2023–2024 | Volga Ulyanovsk | 14 | (0) |
| 2024–2026 | KAMAZ Naberezhnye Chelny | 48 | (0) |
| 2026– | Tekstilshchik Ivanovo | 0 | (0) |
- * Club domestic league appearances and goals as of 16 May 2026

Daniil Aleksandrovich Marugin (Russian: Даниил Александрович Маругин; born 3 August 1998) is a Russian football player who plays for Tekstilshchik Ivanovo.

== Club career ==
He made his debut in the Russian Professional Football League for Kuban-2 Krasnodar on 12 August 2016 in a game against Rotor Volgograd.

He made his debut for the main squad of Kuban Krasnodar on 24 August 2016 in a Russian Cup game against Energomash Belgorod.

== Career statistics ==
As of 16 May 2026

| Club | Season | League | | | Cup | | Total | |
| Club | Season | Division | Apps | Goals | Apps | Goals | Apps | Goals |
|---|---|---|---|---|---|---|---|---|
| Kuban-2 Krasnodar | 2016–17 | Russian Second League | 12 | 0 | — | | 12 | 0 |
| Kuban-2 Krasnodar | 2017–18 | Russian Second League | 26 | 1 | — | | 26 | 1 |
| Kuban-2 Krasnodar | Total | | 38 | 1 | 0 | 0 | 38 | 1 |
| Kuban Krasnodar | 2016–17 | Russian First League | 0 | 0 | 1 | 0 | 1 | 0 |
| Kuban Krasnodar | 2017–18 | Russian First League | 0 | 0 | 0 | 0 | 0 | 0 |
| Kuban Krasnodar | Total | | 0 | 0 | 1 | 0 | 1 | 0 |
| Murom | 2020–21 | Russian Second League | 20 | 2 | 2 | 0 | 22 | 2 |
| Murom | 2021–22 | Russian Second League | 22 | 1 | 1 | 0 | 23 | 1 |
| Murom | Total | | 42 | 3 | 3 | 0 | 45 | 3 |
| Tver | 2022–23 | Russian Second League | 10 | 1 | 0 | 0 | 10 | 1 |
| Tyumen | 2022–23 | Russian Second League | 10 | 1 | — | | 10 | 1 |
| Volga Ulyanovsk | 2023–24 | Russian Second League A | 14 | 0 | 2 | 1 | 16 | 1 |
| KAMAZ Naberezhnye Chelny | 2024–25 | Russian First League | 20 | 0 | 0 | 0 | 20 | 0 |
| KAMAZ Naberezhnye Chelny | 2025–26 | Russian First League | 28 | 0 | 2 | 0 | 30 | 0 |
| KAMAZ Naberezhnye Chelny | Total | | 48 | 0 | 2 | 0 | 50 | 0 |
| Career total | | | 162 | 6 | 8 | 1 | 170 | 7 |
