= Ruslan Dzhamalutdinov =

Russian football player

Personal information
- Full name: Ruslan Yakubovich Dzhamalutdinov
- Date of birth: 1 February 1996 (age 30)
- Place of birth: Korzhevsky, Slavyansky District, Russia
- Height: 1.86 m (6 ft 1 in)
- Position: Defender

Youth career
- 2011–2013: FC Kuban Krasnodar

Senior career*
Years	Team	Apps	(Gls)
2013–2017	FC Kuban Krasnodar	0	(0)
2016–2018	FC Kuban-2 Krasnodar	22	(0)
2017–2018	→ FC Afips Afipsky (loan)	28	(5)
2018	FC Druzhba Maykop	10	(0)
2019	FC Veles Moscow	1	(0)
2019–2020	FC Chernomorets Novorossiysk	17	(2)
2020	FC Forte Taganrog	11	(2)
2021	FC Biolog-Novokubansk	13	(0)
2021	FC Chernomorets Novorossiysk	6	(0)
2022	FC Tuapse	12	(1)
- * Club domestic league appearances and goals

Ruslan Yakubovich Dzhamalutdinov (Russian: Руслан Якубович Джамалутдинов; born 1 February 1996) is a Russian former football player.

== Club career ==
He made his debut for the main squad of FC Kuban Krasnodar on 23 September 2015 in a Russian Cup game against FC Shinnik Yaroslavl.
