= Yuri Mitrokhin =

Russian footballer

Personal information
- Full name: Yuri Sergeyevich Mitrokhin
- Date of birth: 10 October 1997 (age 29)
- Place of birth: Krasnodar, Russia
- Height: 1.80 m (5 ft 11 in)
- Position: Midfielder

Senior career*
Years	Team	Apps	(Gls)
2015–2018	FC Kuban Krasnodar	0	(0)
2016–2018	FC Kuban-2 Krasnodar	53	(1)
2018	FC Kuban-Holding Pavlovskaya (amateur)		
2019–2020	FC Urozhay Krasnodar	15	(0)
- * Club domestic league appearances and goals as of 13 March 2020

Yuri Sergeyevich Mitrokhin (Russian: Юрий Сергеевич Митрохин; born 10 October 1997) is a Russian football player.

== Club career ==
He made his debut in the Russian Professional Football League for FC Kuban-2 Krasnodar on 28 July 2016 in a game against FC Spartak Vladikavkaz.

He made his debut for the main squad of FC Kuban Krasnodar on 24 August 2016 in a Russian Cup game against FC Energomash Belgorod.
