= Ilya Stefanovich =

Russian footballer

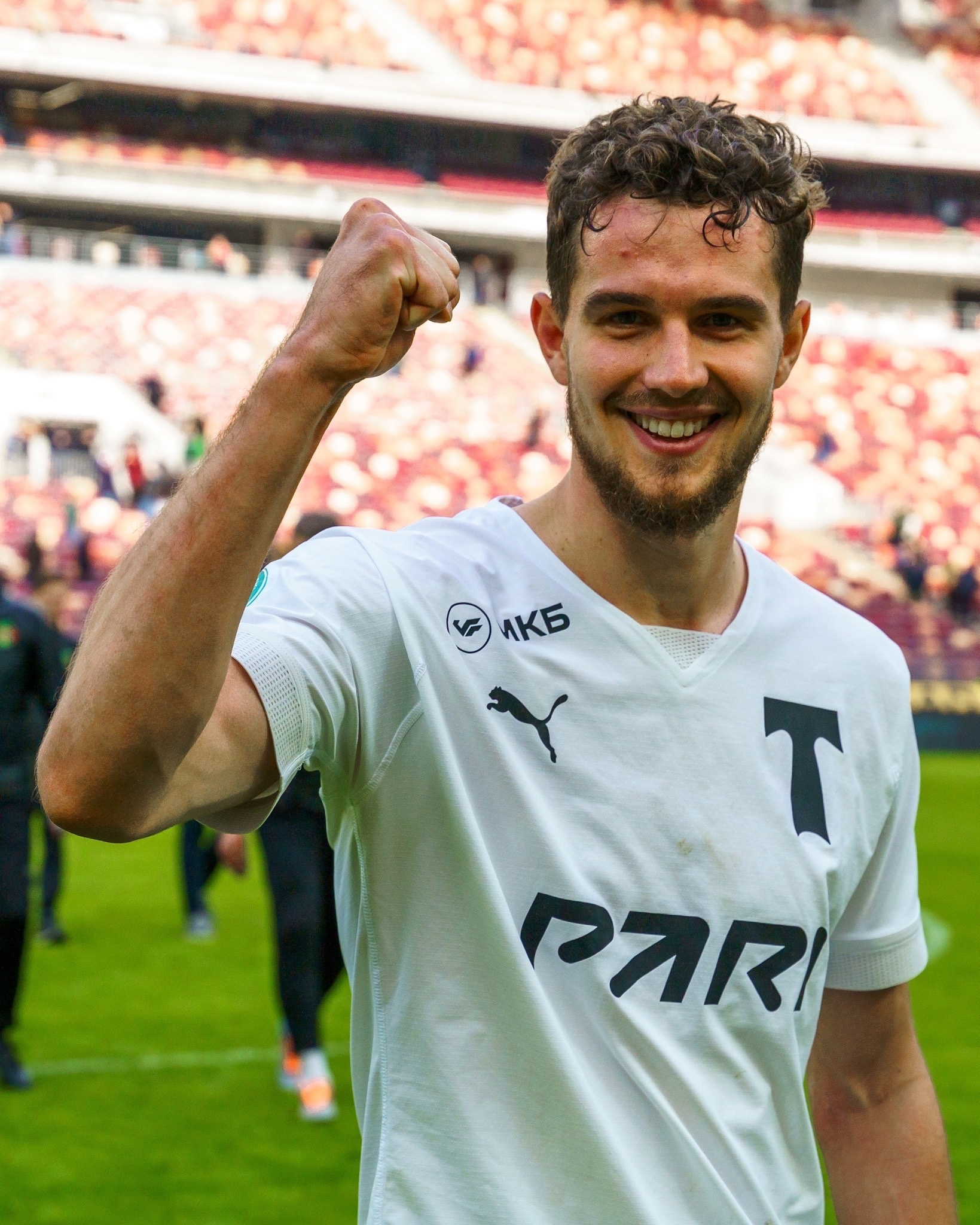
- Stefanovich with Torpedo Moscow in 2023

Personal information
- Full name: Ilya Aleksandrovich Stefanovich
- Date of birth: 23 June 1996 (age 30)
- Place of birth: Dnipropetrovsk, Ukraine
- Height: 1.86 m (6 ft 1 in)
- Position: Forward

Team information
- Current team: FC Leningradets Leningrad Oblast
- Number: 23

Youth career
- 2007–2014: DYuSSh №2 Novouralsk
- 2014: FC Lokomotiv Moscow

Senior career*
Years	Team	Apps	(Gls)
2015	FC Znamya Truda Orekhovo-Zuyevo	4	(0)
2015–2016	FC Kuban Krasnodar	0	(0)
2016–2018	FC Afips Afipsky	45	(7)
2018–2019	FC Chernomorets Novorossiysk	25	(10)
2019	FC KAMAZ Naberezhnye Chelny	17	(0)
2020	FC Veles Moscow	25	(5)
2021	FC Irtysh Omsk	15	(1)
2021–2022	FC Volgar Astrakhan	50	(13)
2023–2024	FC Torpedo Moscow	40	(13)
2024–2025	FC Baltika Kaliningrad	18	(2)
2025	→ FC Baltika-2 Kaliningrad	6	(2)
2025–2026	FC Shinnik Yaroslavl	16	(0)
2026–	FC Leningradets Leningrad Oblast	0	(0)
- * Club domestic league appearances and goals as of 16 May 2026

Ilya Aleksandrovich Stefanovich (Russian: Илья Александрович Стефанович; born 23 June 1996) is a Russian football player who plays as forward for FC Leningradets Leningrad Oblast.

== Club career ==
He made his debut in the Russian Professional Football League for FC Znamya Truda Orekhovo-Zuyevo on 30 April 2015 in a game against FC Strogino Moscow.

He made his debut for the main squad of FC Kuban Krasnodar on 23 September 2015 in a Russian Cup game against FC Shinnik Yaroslavl.

On 3 February 2023, Stefanovich signed with Russian Premier League club FC Torpedo Moscow. He made his RPL debut for Torpedo on 5 March 2023 against FC Krasnodar and scored a goal in a 2–2 away draw.

== Career statistics ==
As of 13 August 2025

Club	Season	League			Cup		Continental		Other		Total	
Club	Season	Division	Apps	Goals	Apps	Goals	Apps	Goals	Apps	Goals	Apps	Goals
Znamya Truda	2014–15	Russian Second League	4	0	–		–		–		4	0
Kuban Krasnodar	2015–16	Russian Premier League	0	0	1	0	–		–		1	0
Afips Afipsky	2016–17	Russian Second League	22	3	0	0	–		–		22	3
Afips Afipsky	2017–18	Russian Second League	23	4	0	0	–		–		23	4
Afips Afipsky	Total		45	7	0	0	0	0	0	0	45	7
Chernomorets Novorossiysk	2018–19	Russian Second League	25	10	4	0	–		–		29	10
KAMAZ	2019–20	Russian Second League	17	0	4	3	–		–		21	3
Veles Moscow	2020–21	Russian First League	25	5	3	3	–		–		28	8
Irtysh Omsk	2020–21	Russian First League	15	1	0	0	–		–		15	1
Volgar Astrakhan	2021–22	Russian First League	32	6	0	0	–		–		32	6
Volgar Astrakhan	2022–23	Russian First League	18	7	2	1	–		–		20	8
Volgar Astrakhan	Total		50	13	2	1	0	0	0	0	52	14
Torpedo Moscow	2022–23	Russian Premier League	13	5	1	0	–		–		14	5
Torpedo Moscow	2023–24	Russian First League	27	8	1	0	–		–		28	8
Torpedo Moscow	Total		40	13	2	0	0	0	0	0	42	13
Baltika Kaliningrad	2024–25	Russian First League	18	2	3	1	–		–		21	3
Baltika Kaliningrad	2025–26	Russian Premier League	0	0	2	0	–		–		2	0
Baltika Kaliningrad	Total		18	2	5	1	0	0	0	0	23	3
Baltika-2 Kaliningrad	2025	Russian Second League B	3	0	–		–		–		3	0
Career total			242	51	21	8	0	0	0	0	263	59
