= Allon Butayev =

Russian footballer

Personal information
- Full name: Allon Aslanovich Butayev
- Date of birth: 7 September 1996 (age 30)
- Place of birth: Vladikavkaz, Russia
- Height: 1.81 m (5 ft 11 1/2 in)
- Position: Defender

Team information
- Current team: Alania Vladikavkaz
- Number: 19

Youth career
- Rubin Kazan

Senior career*
Years	Team	Apps	(Gls)
2015	Digora (amateur)		
2015–2016	Trud Tikhoretsk		
2016–2019	Spartak Vladikavkaz	70	(2)
2019–	Alania Vladikavkaz	173	(4)
2025–2026	→ Sokol Saratov (loan)	31	(0)
- * Club domestic league appearances and goals as of 15 November 2026

Allon Aslanovich Butayev (Russian: Аллон Асланович Бутаев; born 7 September 1996) is a Russian football player who plays for Alania Vladikavkaz.

== Club career ==
He made his debut in the Russian Football National League for Alania Vladikavkaz on 1 August 2020 in a game against SKA-Khabarovsk, as a starter.
