= Vladislav Tyufyakov =

Russian footballer

Personal information
- Full name: Vladislav Mikhailovich Tyufyakov
- Date of birth: 29 August 1996 (age 30)
- Place of birth: Kirov, Russia
- Height: 1.82 m (6 ft 0 in)
- Positions: Defender; midfielder

Senior career*
Years	Team	Apps	(Gls)
2013–2017	FC Kuban Krasnodar	8	(0)
2016–2017	→ FC Kuban-2 Krasnodar	34	(4)
2018–2019	FC KAMAZ Naberezhnye Chelny	21	(2)
2019	FC Inter Cherkessk	13	(1)
2020	FC Forte Taganrog (amateur)		
2020	FC Forte Taganrog	12	(0)
2021–2022	FC Tuapse	46	(0)
- * Club domestic league appearances and goals

Vladislav Mikhailovich Tyufyakov (Russian: Владислав Михайлович Тюфяков; born 29 August 1996) is a Russian former football player.

== Club career ==
He made his debut for the main squad of FC Kuban Krasnodar on 23 September 2015 in a Russian Cup game against FC Shinnik Yaroslavl. He made his Russian Football National League debut for Kuban on 21 August 2016 in a game against FC Mordovia Saransk.
