= Maksim Sidorov (footballer, born 1998) =

Russian footballer

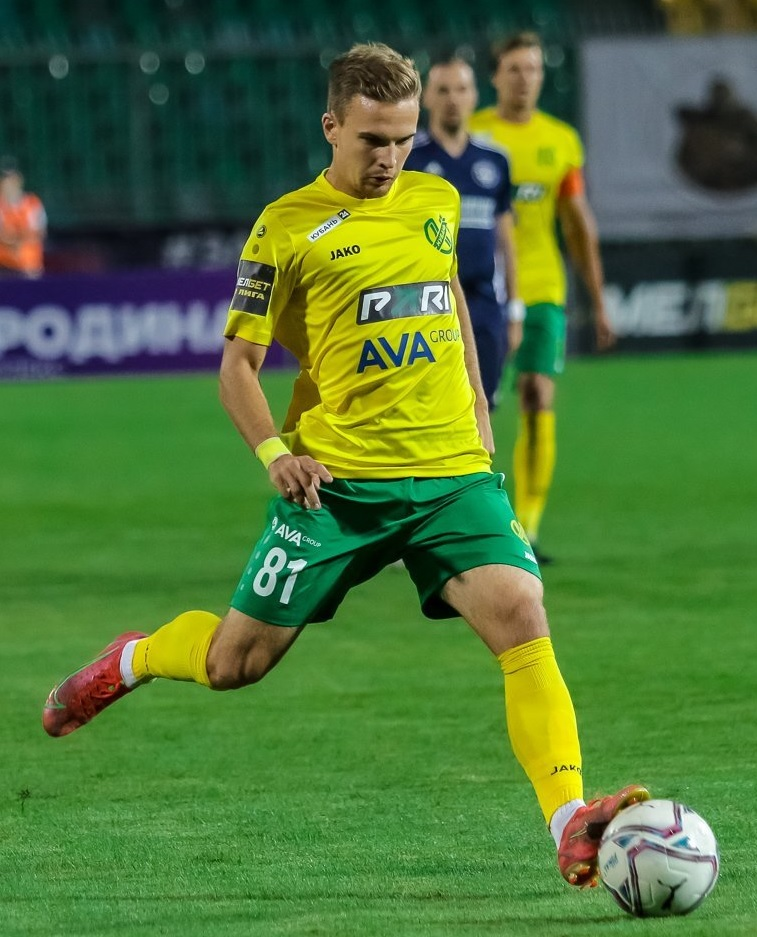
- Sidorov with Kuban Krasnodar in 2022

Personal information
- Full name: Maksim Stanislavovich Sidorov
- Date of birth: 18 March 1998 (age 28)
- Place of birth: Krasnodar, Russia
- Height: 1.77 m (5 ft 10 in)
- Positions: Right-back; left-back

Team information
- Current team: Akhmat Grozny
- Number: 81

Youth career
- –2012: Akademiya Futbola Krasnodar Krai
- 2012–2015: Kuban Krasnodar

Senior career*
Years	Team	Apps	(Gls)
2016–2018	Kuban Krasnodar	5	(0)
2016–2018	Kuban-2 Krasnodar	50	(8)
2018	Dolgoprudny	12	(0)
2019–2023	Kuban Krasnodar	105	(7)
2023–2025	Orenburg	43	(0)
2025–	Akhmat Grozny	29	(1)
- * Club domestic league appearances and goals as of 21 November 2026

Maksim Stanislavovich Sidorov (Russian: Максим Станиславович Сидоров; born 18 March 1998) is a Russian football player who plays as a right-back or left-back for Akhmat Grozny.

== Club career ==
He made his debut in the Russian Professional Football League for Kuban-2 Krasnodar on 28 July 2016 in a game against Spartak Vladikavkaz.

He made his debut for the main squad of Kuban Krasnodar on 24 August 2016 in a Russian Cup game against Energomash Belgorod. He made his Russian Football National League debut for Kuban on 9 August 2017 in a game against Sibir Novosibirsk.

On 7 June 2023, Sidorov signed with Russian Premier League club Orenburg. He made his RPL debut for Orenburg on 30 July 2023 against Rubin Kazan.

On 20 June 2025, Sidorov moved to Akhmat Grozny on a three-season deal.

== Career statistics ==
As of match played 21 November 2026

Appearances and goals by club, season and competition
Club	Season	League			Cup		Total	
Club	Season	Division	Apps	Goals	Apps	Goals	Apps	Goals
Kuban-2 Krasnodar	2016–17	Russian Second League	24	1	—		24	1
Kuban-2 Krasnodar	2017–18	Russian Second League	26	7	—		26	7
Kuban-2 Krasnodar	Total		50	8	0	0	50	8
Kuban Krasnodar	2016–17	Russian First League	0	0	1	0	1	0
Kuban Krasnodar	2017–18	Russian First League	5	0	1	0	6	0
Kuban Krasnodar	Total		5	0	2	0	7	0
Dolgoprudny	2018–19	Russian Second League	12	0	1	0	13	0
Kuban Krasnodar	2018–19	Russian Second League	11	0	—		11	0
Kuban Krasnodar	2019–20	Russian Second League	11	0	1	0	12	0
Kuban Krasnodar	2020–21	Russian Second League	25	2	2	0	27	2
Kuban Krasnodar	2021–22	Russian First League	30	2	4	0	34	2
Kuban Krasnodar	2022–23	Russian First League	28	3	3	0	31	3
Kuban Krasnodar	Total		105	7	10	0	115	7
Orenburg	2023–24	Russian Premier League	17	0	8	0	25	0
Orenburg	2024–25	Russian Premier League	26	0	1	0	27	0
Orenburg	Total		43	0	9	0	52	0
Akhmat Grozny	2025–26	Russian Premier League	23	1	1	0	24	1
Akhmat Grozny	2026–27	Russian Premier League	6	0	5	0	11	0
Akhmat Grozny	Total		29	1	6	0	35	1
Career total			244	16	28	0	272	16
