= FC Kuban-2 Krasnodar =

Kuban-2
- Full name: Футбольный клуб Кубань-2 Краснодар (Football Club Kuban-2 Krasnodar)
- Nickname(s): Kazaki (The Cossacks); Zhelto-zeleniye (The Yellow-Greens); Zhaby (The Toads)
- Founded: 1996, 2015, 2016
- Dissolved: 1997, 2015, 2018
- Ground: Trud Stadium, Krasnodar
- Capacity: 1,500
- League: Russian Professional Football League, Zone South
- 2017–18: 17th
Home colours	Away colours

FC Kuban-2 Krasnodar (Russian: ФК «Кубань-2» Краснодар) was a Russian football team from Krasnodar. It was a farm club for the team FC Kuban Krasnodar.

It was registered to play in the Russian Professional Football League (third level) for the 2016–17 season.

Kuban's reserve team played professionally previously as FC Kuban-d Krasnodar in the Russian Third League 1996 and Russian Third League 1997.

The parent club was dissolved due to accumulated debts in the summer of 2018.

== Last-known line-up ==
As of 22 February 2018, according to the PFL website.

Note: Flags indicate national team as defined under FIFA eligibility rules; some limited exceptions apply. Players may hold more than one non-FIFA nationality.

No.	Pos.	Nation	Player
—	GK	(Russia) RUS	Maksim Borisko
—	GK	(Russia) RUS	Arzamat Gabliya
—	GK	(Russia) RUS	Igor Ivanov
—	GK	(Russia) RUS	Nikolay Moskalenko
—	DF	(Russia) RUS	Ruslan Dzhamalutdinov
—	DF	(Russia) RUS	Yevgeni Gapon
—	DF	(Russia) RUS	Maksim Goloshchapov
—	DF	(Russia) RUS	Bogdan Keyyan
—	DF	(Russia) RUS	Aleksandr Kleshchenko
—	DF	(Russia) RUS	Yevgeni Kolomiyets
—	DF	(Russia) RUS	Georgi Krapivka
—	DF	(Russia) RUS	Daniil Marugin
—	DF	(Russia) RUS	Dmitri Novak
—	DF	(Russia) RUS	Igor Ponomaryov
—	DF	(Russia) RUS	Vladislav Puchkov

No.	Pos.	Nation	Player
—	DF	(Russia) RUS	Yegor Teslenko
—	MF	(Russia) RUS	Ilya Azyavin
—	MF	(Russia) RUS	Aleksandr Dzhumayev
—	MF	(Russia) RUS	Daniil Katayev
—	MF	(Russia) RUS	Ruslan Kausarov
—	MF	(Russia) RUS	Yuri Mitrokhin
—	MF	(Russia) RUS	Anatoli Nemchenko
—	MF	(Russia) RUS	Ilya Oleynik
—	MF	(Russia) RUS	Maksim Sidorov
—	MF	(Russia) RUS	Kirill Volchkov
—	MF	(Russia) RUS	Yuri Zavezyon
—	FW	(Russia) RUS	Saveli Pochtarev
—	FW	(Russia) RUS	Daniil Sednev
—	FW	(Russia) RUS	Nikita Skuridin
