= Aleksandr Kleshchenko =

Russian footballer

Personal information
- Full name: Aleksandr Aleksandrovich Kleshchenko
- Date of birth: 2 November 1995 (age 30)
- Place of birth: Vladikavkaz, Russia
- Height: 1.86 m (6 ft 1 in)
- Positions: Defender; midfielder

Team information
- Current team: Rotor Volgograd
- Number: 24

Senior career*
Years	Team	Apps	(Gls)
2012–2013	Alania Vladikavkaz	0	(0)
2013–2014	Alania-d Vladikavkaz	17	(0)
2014–2018	Kuban Krasnodar	38	(0)
2016–2018	→ Kuban-2 Krasnodar (loan)	20	(0)
2018	Tom Tomsk	23	(2)
2019	Tobol	12	(0)
2019	Yenisey Krasnoyarsk	14	(0)
2020–2021	Ordabasy	37	(1)
2022	Turan	11	(0)
2022–2025	Rodina Moscow	55	(3)
2025–	Rotor Volgograd	28	(3)

International career
2010	Russia U-16	3	(0)
- * Club domestic league appearances and goals as of 16 May 2026

Aleksandr Aleksandrovich Kleshchenko (Russian: Александр Александрович Клещенко; born 2 November 1995) is a Russian professional football player who plays for Rotor Volgograd.

== Club career ==
Kleshchenko played for FC Alania Vladikavkaz in the 2012–13 Russian Cup game against FC Tyumen on 27 September 2012.

Kleshchenko made his debut for the main squad of FC Kuban Krasnodar on 23 September 2015 in a Russian Cup game against FC Shinnik Yaroslavl.

Kleshchenko made his debut in the Russian Football Premier League for FC Kuban Krasnodar on 24 October 2015 in a game against FC Mordovia Saransk.

Kleshchenko signed a two-year contract with FC Tobol on 30 January 2019. On 5 July 2019, Kleshchenko left Tobol by mutual consent.

On 11 February 2020, Kleshchenko signed for FC Ordabasy.

In January 2022, Kleshchenko signed for Turan before leaving the club by mutual agreement in June 2022.
