= Maksim Borisko =

Russian football player

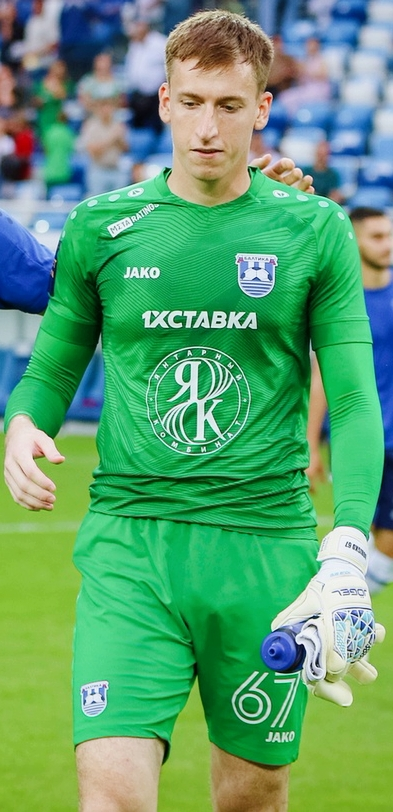
- Borisko with Baltika Kaliningrad in 2022

Personal information
- Full name: Maksim Romanovich Borisko
- Date of birth: 15 February 2000 (age 26)
- Place of birth: Krasnodar, Russia
- Height: 1.96 m (6 ft 5 in)
- Position: Goalkeeper

Team information
- Current team: CSKA Moscow
- Number: 39

Youth career
- 2008–2011: Krasnodar
- 2011–2015: CSPF Krasnodar
- 2016: FC Kuban Krasnodar

Senior career*
Years	Team	Apps	(Gls)
2017–2018	Kuban Krasnodar	0	(0)
2017–2018	→ Kuban-2 Krasnodar	19	(0)
2018–2019	Urozhay Krasnodar	8	(0)
2019–2026	Baltika Kaliningrad	105	(0)
2024	Baltika-BFU Kaliningrad	1	(0)
2026–	CSKA Moscow	4	(0)

International career^{‡}
2019	Russia U-19	2	(0)
2021	Russia U-21	5	(0)
- * Club domestic league appearances and goals as of 21 November 2026 ‡ National team caps and goals as of 16 November 2021

Maksim Romanovich Borisko (Russian: Максим Романович Бориско; born 15 February 2000) is a Russian professional footballer who plays as a goalkeeper for CSKA Moscow.

== Club career ==
Borisko made his debut in the Russian Professional Football League for Kuban-2 Krasnodar on 20 March 2017 in a game against Chernomorets Novorossiysk.

He made his Russian Football National League debut for Baltika Kaliningrad on 28 July 2019 in a game against Chertanovo Moscow.

Borisko made his Russian Premier League debut for Baltika on 4 November 2023 against Zenit St. Petersburg.

On 5 June 2024, Borisko extended his contract with Baltika for the 2024–25 season. On 18 July 2025, the contract was extended to June 2028.

On 28 July 2026, Borisko signed a three-year deal with CSKA Moscow.

== International career ==
Borisko was first called up to the Russia national football team in November 2025 for friendlies.

== Career statistics ==
As of 21 November 2026

Club	Season	League			Cup		Total	
Club	Season	Division	Apps	Goals	Apps	Goals	Apps	Goals
Kuban-2 Krasnodar	2016–17	Russian Second League	5	0	–		5	0
Kuban-2 Krasnodar	2017–18	Russian Second League	14	0	–		14	0
Kuban-2 Krasnodar	Total		19	0	0	0	19	0
Kuban Krasnodar	2017–18	Russian First League	0	0	0	0	0	0
Urozhay Krasnodar	2018–19	Russian Second League	8	0	0	0	8	0
Baltika Kaliningrad	2019–20	Russian First League	10	0	1	0	11	0
Baltika Kaliningrad	2020–21	Russian First League	10	0	0	0	10	0
Baltika Kaliningrad	2021–22	Russian First League	16	0	0	0	16	0
Baltika Kaliningrad	2022–23	Russian First League	14	0	0	0	14	0
Baltika Kaliningrad	2023–24	Russian Premier League	3	0	4	0	7	0
Baltika Kaliningrad	2024–25	Russian First League	28	0	0	0	28	0
Baltika Kaliningrad	2025–26	Russian Premier League	23	0	0	0	23	0
Baltika Kaliningrad	2026–27	Russian Premier League	1	0	0	0	1	0
Baltika Kaliningrad	Total		105	0	5	0	110	0
Baltika-BFU Kaliningrad	2024	Russian Second League B	1	0	–		1	0
CSKA Moscow	2026–27	Russian Premier League	4	0	4	0	8	0
Career total			137	0	9	0	146	0
