= Ihor Zhurakhovskyi =

Ukrainian footballer

Personal information
- Full name: Ihor Ihorovych Zhurakhovskyi
- Date of birth: 19 September 1994 (age 32)
- Place of birth: Kyiv, Ukraine
- Height: 1.86 m (6 ft 1 in)
- Position: Midfielder

Team information
- Current team: Rostocker FC
- Number: 52

Youth career
- 2005–2010: Sports School #15 Kyiv

Senior career*
Years	Team	Apps	(Gls)
2013–2015	Metalurh Zaporizhzhia	36	(1)
2016–2017	Kuban Krasnodar	3	(0)
2017	Olimpik Donetsk	1	(0)
2017–2018	Gefle IF	6	(0)
2018–2021	FCI Levadia	36	(5)
2022–	Rostocker FC	6	(0)

International career^{‡}
2014–2015	Ukraine-21	5	(1)
- * Club domestic league appearances and goals as of 12 November 2022 ‡ National team caps and goals as of 5 August 2017

Ihor Ihorovych Zhurakhovskyi (Ukrainian: Ігор Ігорович Жураховський; born 19 September 1994) is a Ukrainian professional football midfielder who plays for German NOFV-Oberliga Nord club Rostocker FC.

Zhurakhovskyi is a product of Sports School #15 Kyiv. Made his debut for FC Metalurh entering as a second time playing against FC Metalurh Donetsk on 11 May 2014 in Ukrainian Premier League.

== Early life ==
Ihor Zhurakhovskyi was born in Kyiv. From his early years play football. The pupil football sports school №15 in Kyiv. Besides football actively engaged in football freestyle. Three times (2009, 2012, 2013) participated in national competitions Red Bull Street Style. All three times was among the Top8.

== Club career ==
Since the season 2013/14 he is a player of FC Metalurh Zaporizhzhia. On 12 September 2013, he made his debut in the Metallurg U-21 in the home match against Chernomorets Odesa. In total, he played for Metallurg U-21 played 12 games (1 goal) in the Ukrainian Championship among youth teams of the season 2013/14. In the spring of 2014, he began to train with the first team Metallurg. On 11 May 2014, he made his debut for the first team in the Premier League away match in the 29th round against Metallurg Donetsk(0:2), coming on as substitute in the 82nd minute of the match.

Before the start of the season 2014/15 for the first time took part in pre-season training camp of the basic structure. In preparation he played 6 games (all in start) against Zarya (Luhansk), Hajduk (Split, Croatia), Rabotnicki (Skopje, Macedonia), Sarajevo (Bosnia), Domžale (Slovenia), Triglav (Kranj, Slovenia).

On 27 July 2014, spent his first full official match, coming into the starting lineup of Metallurg in the match of the 1st round of the Ukrainian Championship League 2014/15 season against Shakhtar (Donetsk) (0:2).

On 21 January 2015, scored his first goal for the first team of Metallurg, in a friendly match against FC Okzhetpes (Kokshetau, Kazakhstan), at the training camp in Belek, Turkey.

== International career ==
In early November 2014, he was among the 24 players called by Serhiy Kovalets (head coach) to training camp of the U-21 national team of Ukraine, which was officially announced on 6 November at the site of the Football Federation of Ukraine. He played the first official game for the U-21 team of Ukraine on 13 November 2014, against the youth team of Turkey (2:0).

== Statistics ==
=== Club statistics ===
Club	Season	League			Cup			Europe			Total		
Club	Season	Apps	Goals	Assists	Apps	Goals	Assists	Apps	Goals	Assists	Apps	Goals	Assists
FC Metalurg (Zaporizhya)	2013/14	1	0	0	0	0	0	-	-	-	1	0	0
FC Metalurg (Zaporizhya)	2014/15	22	0	1	2	0	0	-	-	-	24	0	1
FC Metalurg (Zaporizhya)	2015/16	11	0	2	1	1	0	-	-	-	12	1	2
FC Metalurg (Zaporizhya)	Total	34	0	3	3	1	0	-	-	-	37	1	3
Career total		34	0	3	3	1	0	-	-	-	37	1	3

=== Apps and goals for the Ukraine U-21 ===
№	Date	Opponent	Score	Goals	Assists	Сompetition
1	13 Nov 2014	Turkey U-21	2:0	0	0	Friendly match
1	2 Jun 2015	Moldova U-21	5:0	0	1	V. Lobanovskyi Memorial Tournament
1	8 Sep 2015	Denmark U-21	2:0	1	0	Friendly match
