= Yuri Zavezyon =

Russian footballer

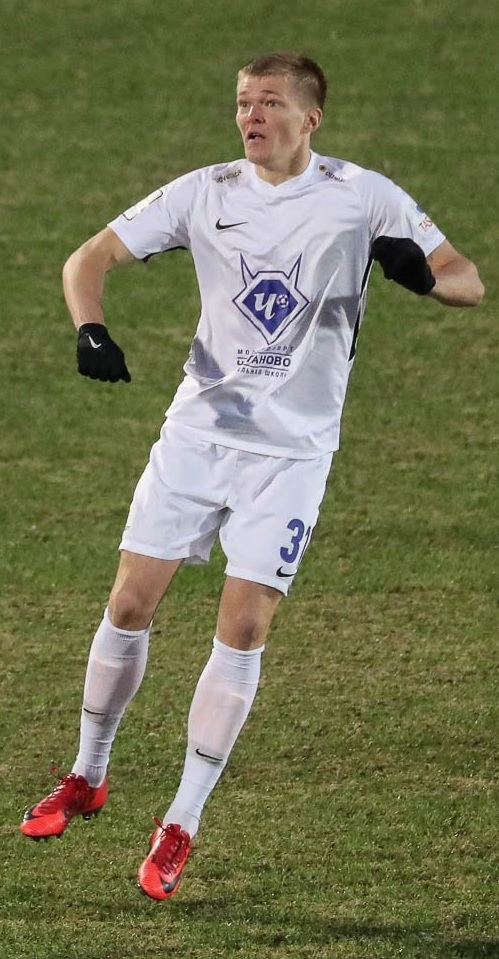
- Zavezyon with Chertanovo in 2021

Personal information
- Full name: Yuri Sergeyevich Zavezyon
- Date of birth: 28 January 1996 (age 30)
- Place of birth: Solyonoye, Yashaltinsky District, Kalmykia, Russia
- Height: 1.81 m (5 ft 11 in)
- Positions: Forward; midfielder

Team information
- Current team: FC Veles Moscow
- Number: 22

Youth career
- –2010: FC Stavropol
- 2010–2011: DYuSSh Kozhany Myach Roman Pavlyuchenko
- 2011–2013: Chertanovo Education Center

Senior career*
Years	Team	Apps	(Gls)
2013–2018	FC Kuban Krasnodar	39	(2)
2016–2018	→ FC Kuban-2 Krasnodar	25	(1)
2018–2019	FC Rotor Volgograd	19	(0)
2019–2021	FC Chertanovo Moscow	57	(6)
2021–2022	FC Metallurg Lipetsk	28	(1)
2022–2023	FC Atyrau	11	(1)
2023–2025	FC Rotor Volgograd	66	(1)
2025–	FC Veles Moscow	30	(0)

International career
2012	Russia U16	9	(0)
2012–2013	Russia U17	7	(2)
- * Club domestic league appearances and goals as of 13 June 2026

Yuri Sergeyevich Zavezyon (Russian: Юрий Сергеевич Завезён; born 28 January 1996) is a Russian professional footballer who plays for FC Veles Moscow.

== Club career ==
He made his debut for the main squad of FC Kuban Krasnodar on 23 September 2015 in a Russian Cup game against FC Shinnik Yaroslavl. He made his Russian Football National League debut for Kuban on 11 July 2016 in a game against PFC Spartak Nalchik.
