= Dmitri Stajila =

Moldovan-Russian footballer

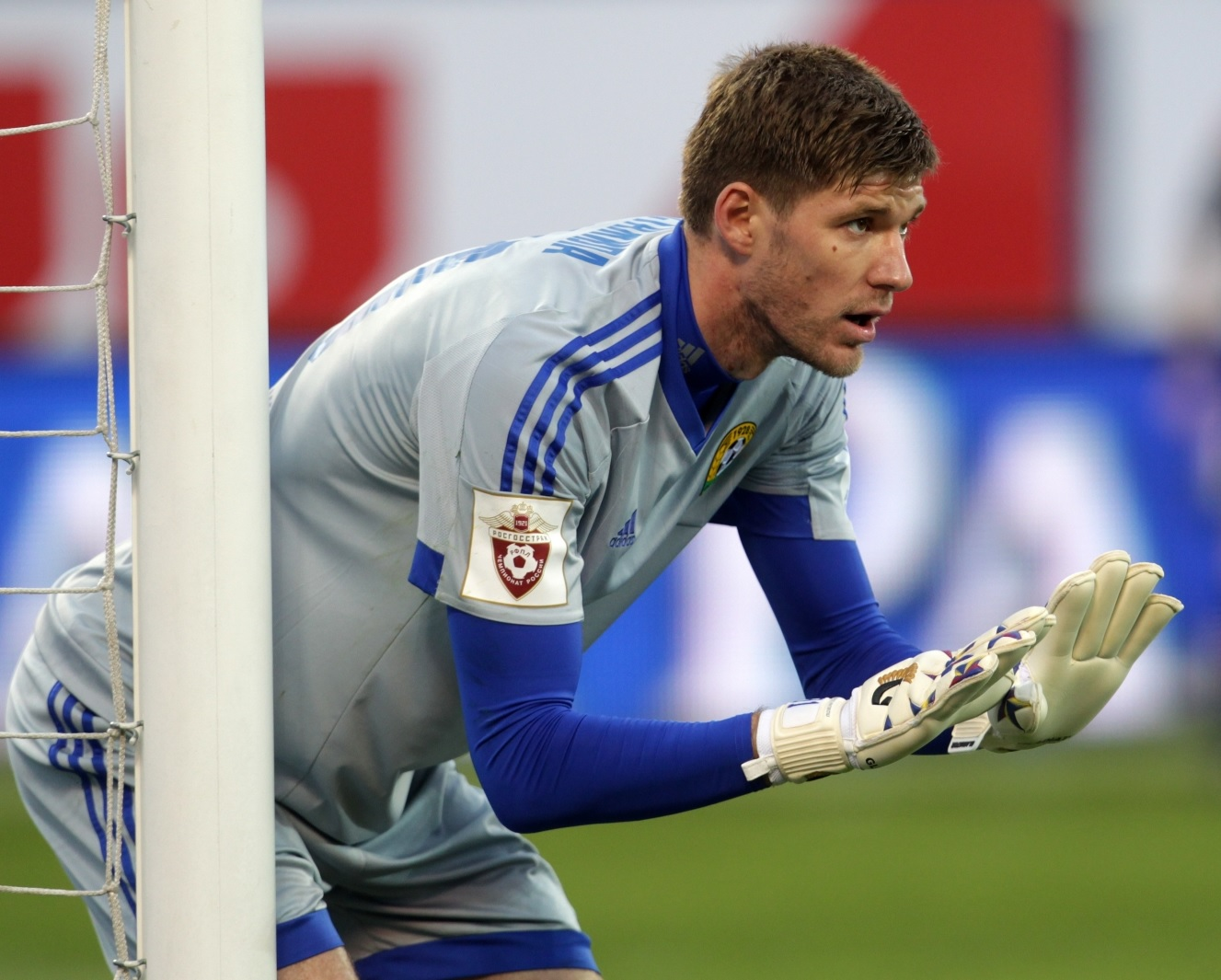
- Stajila with Kuban in 2016

Personal information
- Date of birth: 2 August 1991 (age 35)
- Place of birth: Tiraspol, Moldova
- Height: 2.04 m (6 ft 8 1/2 in)
- Position: Goalkeeper

Team information
- Current team: Alga Bishkek
- Number: 1

Senior career*
Years	Team	Apps	(Gls)
2009–2016	Sheriff	63	(0)
2014	→ Dinamo-Auto (loan)	1	(0)
2015	→ Kukësi (loan)	4	(0)
2016	Kuban	5	(0)
2017–2018	Mashuk-KMV	18	(0)
2018–2019	Al-Mujazzal		
2019–2020	Laçi	35	(0)
2021–2022	BFC Dynamo	37	(0)
2022–2023	Rostocker FC	6	(0)
2024	Eskhata Khujand	19	(0)
2025–	Alga Bishkek	14	(0)

International career
2009	Moldova U19	6	(0)
- * Club domestic league appearances and goals as of 2 October 2025

Dmitri Stajila (born 2 August 1991) is a Moldovan football goalkeeper who plays for Kyrgyz Premier League club Alga Bishkek. Over two meters tall, he also holds Russian citizenship as Dmitri Igorevich Stazhila (Russian: Дмитрий Игоревич Стажила).

== Club career ==
=== Kuban Krasnodar ===
On 19 February 2016, he signed a 3-year contract with the Russian side FC Kuban Krasnodar.

== Honours ==
Sheriff Tiraspol

- Moldovan National Division (4) : 2009–10, 2011–12, 2012–13, 2013–14
- Moldovan Cup (1) : 2009-10

Runner-Up (1) : 2013-14

- Moldovan Super Cup (1) : 2013

Individual

- Most Clean Sheets (1) : Season 2013–14 = 17 matches without goal
