= Amir Dzhumayev =

Russian football player

Personal information
- Full name: Amir Arsenovich Dzhumayev
- Date of birth: 20 March 1998 (age 28)
- Place of birth: Khabez, Russia
- Height: 1.70 m (5 ft 7 in)
- Position: Midfielder

Team information
- Current team: Dynamo Stavropol
- Number: 70

Senior career*
Years	Team	Apps	(Gls)
2016–2018	Kuban Krasnodar	1	(0)
2016–2018	Kuban-2 Krasnodar	47	(3)
2018–2019	Urozhay Krasnodar	21	(2)
2019	Mordovia Saransk	18	(1)
2020	Armavir	2	(0)
2020	Dynamo Bryansk	2	(0)
2020–2021	Tver	6	(0)
2021–2023	Mashuk-KMV Pyatigorsk	35	(3)
2023–2024	Nart Cherkessk (amateur)		
2024–2025	Nart Cherkessk	27	(8)
2025–2026	Dynamo Stavropol	16	(4)
2026	Nart Cherkessk	9	(0)
2026–	Dynamo Stavropol	7	(0)
- * Club domestic league appearances and goals as of 17 October 2026

Amir Arsenovich Dzhumayev (Russian: Амир Арсенович Джумаев; born 20 March 1998) is a Russian football player who plays for Dynamo Stavropol.

Before 2022, he was known as Aleksandr Dzhumayev (Russian: Александр Джумаев).

== Club career ==
He made his debut in the Russian Professional Football League for Kuban-2 Krasnodar on 28 July 2016 in a game against Spartak Vladikavkaz.

He made his debut for the main squad of Kuban Krasnodar on 24 August 2016 in a Russian Cup game against Energomash Belgorod.

He made his Russian Football National League debut for Kuban on 18 November 2017 in a game against Tyumen.
