= 2015–16 FC Mordovia Saransk season =

Mordovia Saransk
2015–16 season
- Chairman: Nikolay Levin
- Manager: Andrei Gordeyev (until 7 April 2016); Marat Mustafin (caretaker) (from 7 April 2016)
- Stadium: Start Stadium
- Russian Premier League: 16th
- Russian Cup: Round of 32 vs Khimki
- Top goalscorer: League: Yevgeni Lutsenko (10); All: Yevgeni Lutsenko (10)
| Home colours | Away colours |

The 2015–16 FC Mordovia Saransk season was the club's second season back in the Russian Premier League, the highest tier of football in Russia. It was their third season in the Russian Premier League having also participated in the 2012–13 season, before relegation back to the Russian National League. They also competed in the Russian Cup, where they were .

== Squad ==
Note: Flags indicate national team as defined under FIFA eligibility rules; some limited exceptions apply. Players may hold more than one non-FIFA nationality.

| No. | Pos. | Nation | Player |
|---|---|---|---|
| 1 | GK | MDA | Ilie Cebanu |
| 3 | DF | RUS | Yevgeni Gapon |
| 4 | DF | BLR | Igor Shitov |
| 5 | DF | GEO | Mamuka Kobakhidze (on loan from Rubin) |
| 8 | MF | RUS | Anton Bober |
| 10 | FW | RUS | Pavel Ignatovich |
| 13 | FW | RUS | Mikhail Markin |
| 15 | MF | RUS | Emin Makhmudov (on loan from Krylia Sovetov) |
| 16 | MF | SLO | Dalibor Stevanović |
| 17 | MF | RUS | Aslan Dudiyev |
| 22 | FW | RUS | Sergey Samodin |
| 23 | FW | RUS | Ruslan Mukhametshin |
| 25 | MF | RUS | Yevgeni Shipitsin |

| No. | Pos. | Nation | Player |
|---|---|---|---|
| 32 | DF | SRB | Marko Lomić |
| 33 | DF | RUS | Vladimir Rykov |
| 40 | DF | SRB | Milan Perendija |
| 48 | FW | RUS | Yevgeni Lutsenko |
| 55 | DF | RUS | Ruslan Nakhushev |
| 57 | FW | RUS | Ruslan Navlyotov |
| 71 | DF | RUS | Maksim Tishkin |
| 77 | GK | GEO | Nukri Revishvili |
| 84 | MF | RUS | Oleg Vlasov |
| 88 | MF | RUS | Aleksei Ivanov |
| 89 | GK | RUS | Denis Shebanov |
| 97 | DF | FRA | Thomas Phibel |

=== Youth team ===
Note: Flags indicate national team as defined under FIFA eligibility rules; some limited exceptions apply. Players may hold more than one non-FIFA nationality.

| No. | Pos. | Nation | Player |
|---|---|---|---|
| 41 | GK | RUS | Aleksandr Popov |
| 42 | DF | RUS | Nikita Usov |
| 43 | DF | RUS | Nikita Aksyonov |
| 44 | DF | RUS | Sergei Shirshikov |
| 45 | DF | RUS | Aleksandr Tenyayev |
| 46 | DF | RUS | Ilya Kuzin |
| 47 | MF | RUS | Alen Askerov |
| 49 | DF | RUS | Sergei Uchelkin |
| 50 | MF | RUS | Artyom Grishin |
| 51 | GK | RUS | Evgeniy Uvin |
| 52 | DF | RUS | Yegor Sysuyev |
| 53 | DF | RUS | Eduard Mansurov |
| 54 | MF | RUS | Artur Igoshev |
| 56 | MF | RUS | Vladislav Adayev |

| No. | Pos. | Nation | Player |
|---|---|---|---|
| 58 | MF | RUS | Dinar Khaybuillin |
| 59 | FW | RUS | Sergei Tishenkov |
| 60 | FW | RUS | Vladimir Zmeyov |
| 62 | FW | RUS | Aleksandr Cherentaev |
| 63 | MF | RUS | Nikita Mukhin |
| 64 | MF | RUS | Pavel Kulnin |
| 65 | MF | RUS | Vladislav Nurgaleyev |
| 67 | MF | RUS | Artyom Yaschuk |
| 68 | MF | RUS | Yegor Dmitriev |
| 69 | MF | RUS | Aleksandr Kurchavyi |
| 73 | MF | RUS | Anton Afonin |
| 74 | DF | RUS | Aleksei Chubukin |
| 75 | FW | RUS | Andrei Malanyin |
| 95 | GK | RUS | Roman Kalyuzhny |

== Transfers ==
=== Summer ===
In: Note: Flags indicate national team as defined under FIFA eligibility rules; some limited exceptions apply. Players may hold more than one non-FIFA nationality.

| No. | Pos. | Nation | Player |
|---|---|---|---|
| 5 | DF | GEO | Mamuka Kobakhidze (on loan from (Russia) Rubin Kazan) |
| 15 | MF | RUS | Emin Makhmudov (on loan from (Russia) Krylia Sovetov Samara) |
| 16 | MF | SLO | Dalibor Stevanović (from (Russia) Torpedo Moscow) |
| 23 | FW | RUS | Ruslan Mukhametshin (from (Russia) Rubin Kazan, previously on loan) |
| 25 | MF | RUS | Yevgeni Shipitsin (from (Russia) Krasnodar) |
| 33 | DF | RUS | Vladimir Rykov (from (Russia) Torpedo Moscow) |
| 43 | DF | RUS | Nikita Aksyonov (from (Russia) Mordovia-2 Saransk) |
| 46 | DF | RUS | Ilya Kuzin |
| 50 | MF | RUS | Artyom Grishin (from (Russia) Mordovia-2 Saransk) |
| 51 | GK | RUS | Yevgeni Uvin |
| 52 | DF | RUS | Yegor Sysuyev (from (Russia) Mordovia-2 Saransk) |
| 58 | MF | RUS | Dinar Khaybullin (from (Russia) Saransk-Mordovia Saransk) |
| 59 | FW | RUS | Sergei Tishenkov (from (Russia) Mordovia-2 Saransk) |
| 63 | MF | RUS | Nikita Mukhin (from (Russia) Mordovia-2 Saransk) |
| 64 | MF | RUS | Pavel Kulnin (from (Russia) Mordovia-2 Saransk) |
| 67 | MF | RUS | Artyom Yashchuk (from (Russia) Mordovia-2 Saransk) |
| 68 | MF | RUS | Yegor Dmitriyev (from (Russia) Khimik-Avgust Vurnary) |
| 69 | MF | RUS | Aleksandr Kurchavy |
| 71 | DF | RUS | Maksim Tishkin (from (Russia) Ufa) |
| 73 | MF | RUS | Anton Afonin |
| 77 | GK | GEO | Nukri Revishvili (from (Russia) Tosno) |
| 97 | DF | FRA | Thomas Phibel |

Out: Note: Flags indicate national team as defined under FIFA eligibility rules; some limited exceptions apply. Players may hold more than one non-FIFA nationality.

| No. | Pos. | Nation | Player |
|---|---|---|---|
| 1 | GK | RUS | Anton Kochenkov (to (Russia) Lokomotiv Moscow) |
| 5 | DF | RUS | Viktor Vasin (end of loan from (Russia) CSKA Moscow) |
| 6 | MF | NED | Mitchell Donald (on loan to (Serbia) Red Star Belgrade) |
| 9 | MF | RUS | Rustem Mukhametshin (to (Russia) Tosno) |
| 10 | MF | BEL | Danilo (to (Ukraine) Dnipro Dnipropetrovsk) |
| 12 | DF | MNE | Vladimir Božović |
| 14 | MF | RUS | Pavel Yakovlev (end of loan from (Russia) Spartak Moscow) |
| 18 | DF | SEN | Baye Ibrahima Niasse (released) |
| 20 | MF | UKR | Matvey Guyganov |
| 34 | MF | RUS | Igor Krutov (to (Russia) Astrakhan) |
| 46 | DF | RUS | Zaur Alborov |
| 49 | MF | RUS | Timon Abbakumov |
| 50 | MF | RUS | Dmitri Larin |
| 51 | GK | RUS | Yevgeni Zimin |
| 53 | MF | RUS | Timur Raimov |
| 58 | MF | RUS | Aleksandr Shinkarenko (to (Russia) Kafa Feodosiya) |
| 61 | GK | RUS | Aleksei Varlamov |
| 62 | FW | RUS | Oleg Kachmazov |
| 64 | MF | RUS | Andrei Yemelin |
| 65 | MF | RUS | Aleksei Larin |
| 67 | DF | RUS | David Ozmanov (to (Russia) SKA-Energiya Khabarovsk) |
| 68 | DF | RUS | Farid Kutbeyev |
| 71 | GK | RUS | Ilya Kamalikhin |
| 75 | FW | RUS | Denis Abramov |
| 76 | FW | RUS | Ilya Yermoshkin |
| 81 | GK | RUS | Nikita Khaykin (to (Russia) Kuban Krasnodar) |
| 82 | DF | RUS | Vladimir Kotkov |
| 83 | FW | RUS | Maksim Churakov |
| 91 | MF | NED | Lorenzo Ebecilio (end of loan from (Ukraine) Metalurh Donetsk) |
| — | DF | RUS | Aleksandr Strokov (released, previously on loan at (Russia) Tambov) |
| — | FW | RUS | Mikhail Markin (on loan to (Russia) Tyumen, previously on loan at (Russia) Khimki) |
| — | FW | RUS | Maksim Rogov (to (Russia) Dynamo Saint Petersburg, previously on loan) |

=== Winter ===
In: Note: Flags indicate national team as defined under FIFA eligibility rules; some limited exceptions apply. Players may hold more than one non-FIFA nationality.

| No. | Pos. | Nation | Player |
|---|---|---|---|
| 13 | FW | RUS | Mikhail Markin (end of loan to (Russia) Tyumen) |

Out: Note: Flags indicate national team as defined under FIFA eligibility rules; some limited exceptions apply. Players may hold more than one non-FIFA nationality.

| No. | Pos. | Nation | Player |
|---|---|---|---|
| 7 | MF | FRA | Damien Le Tallec (to (Serbia) Red Star Belgrade) |
| 11 | FW | RUS | Dmitri Sysuyev (to (Russia) Ufa) |
| 20 | FW | POR | Yannick Djaló (end of loan from (Portugal) Benfica) |
| — | MF | NED | Mitchell Donald (to (Serbia) Red Star Belgrade, previously on loan) |

== Competitions ==
=== Russian Premier League ===
==== Results by round ====
| Round | 1 | 2 | 3 | 4 | 5 | 6 | 7 | 8 | 9 | 10 | 11 | 12 | 13 | 14 | 15 | 16 | 17 | 18 | 19 | 20 | 21 | 22 | 23 | 24 | 25 | 26 | 27 | 28 | 29 | 30 |
|---|---|---|---|---|---|---|---|---|---|---|---|---|---|---|---|---|---|---|---|---|---|---|---|---|---|---|---|---|---|---|
| Ground | H | A | H | A | H | A | H | A | H | A | H | A | H | A | H | H | A | H | A | H | A | H | A | H | A | H | A | H | A | A |
| Result | L | D | D | D | L | D | W | L | L | L | L | L | D | D | W | D | L | D | D | L | D | L | L | D | D | W | W | L | L | L |
| Position | 13 | 11 | 11 | 13 | 14 | 13 | 10 | 12 | 13 | 13 | 16 | 16 | 15 | 15 | 15 | 15 | 15 | 16 | 16 | 16 | 15 | 15 | 16 | 15 | 16 | 14 | 14 | 14 | 16 | 16 |

Updated to match(es) played on 21 May 2016. Source: Matches
A = Away; H = Home; W = Win; D = Draw; L = Loss

==== Matches ====
| 19 July 2015 1 | Mordovia Saransk | 0 – 1 | Lokomotiv Moscow | Saransk |
| 18:00 MSK (UTC+3) | Donald (yellow card) 58'; Gapon (yellow card) 70'; Nakhushev (yellow card) 90+2' | Summary | Ćorluka (yellow card) 31'; Škuletić 60'; Shishkin (yellow card) 90+3' | Stadium: Start Stadium; Attendance: 7,210; Referee: Igor Nizovtsev |

| 25 July 2015 2 | Dynamo Moscow | 2 – 2 | Mordovia Saransk | Khimki |
| 18:30 MSK (UTC+3) | Ionov 12'; Valbuena 28' (pen.); Vainqueur (yellow card) 74'; Danilkin (yellow card) 81' | Summary | Lutsenko 24'; Nakhushev (yellow card) 27'; Shitov (yellow card) 62'; Mukhametshin (yellow card) 70'; Donald 82' (pen.) | Stadium: Arena Khimki; Attendance: 5,596; Referee: Kirill Levnikov |

| 2 August 2015 3 | Mordovia Saransk | 1 – 1 | Ural | Saransk |
| 17:00 MSK (UTC+3) | Lutsenko 90+1' (yellow card) 90+2' | Summary | Manucharyan 41' | Stadium: Start Stadium; Attendance: 5,578; Referee: Mikhail Vilkov |

| 7 August 2015 4 | Terek Grozny | 0 – 0 | Mordovia Saransk | Grozny |
| 19:00 MSK (UTC+3) | Ivanov (yellow card) 90' | Summary | Le Tallec (yellow card) 15' | Stadium: Akhmat-Arena; Attendance: 12,470; Referee: Aleksei Matyunin |

| 17 August 2015 5 | Mordovia Saransk | 0 – 1 | Ufa | Saransk |
| 21:00 YEKT (UTC+5) | Stevanović (yellow card) 57'; Shitov (yellow card) 90+1' | Summary | Marcinho (yellow card) 58'; Stotsky 82' | Stadium: Start Stadium; Attendance: 1,200; Referee: Aleksey Eskov |

| 23 August 2015 6 | Krasnodar | 0 – 0 | Mordovia Saransk | Krasnodar |
| 20:00 MSK (UTC+3) | Wánderson (yellow card) 49' | Summary | Stevanović (yellow card) 36'; Shitov (yellow card) 54'; Nakhushev (yellow card) 62' | Stadium: Kuban Stadium; Attendance: 7,066; Referee: Alexey Nikolaev |

| 30 August 2015 7 | Mordovia Saransk | 2 – 1 | Rubin Kazan | Samara |
| 18:00 MSK (UTC+3) | Stevanović 37' (pen.); Nakhushev (yellow card) 43'; Mukhametshin 49', (yellow card) 84' | Report | Dyadyun (yellow card) 23'; Ryzhikov (red card) 33'; Portnyagin 61'; Ozdoev (yellow card) 77'; Kuzmin (yellow card) 90+2'; Bilyaletdinov (yellow card) 90+2' | Stadium: Metallurg Stadium; Attendance: 1,107; Referee: Sergey Karasev |

| 14 September 2015 8 | Krylia Sovetov | 1 – 0 | Mordovia Saransk | Samara |
| 18:30 MSK (UTC+3) | Gabulov 30'; Nadson (yellow card) 52' | Summary | Stevanović (yellow card) 72' | Stadium: Metallurg Stadium; Attendance: 14,273; Referee: Sergey Karasev |

| 20 September 2015 9 | Mordovia Saransk | 4 – 6 | CSKA Moscow | Saransk |
| 13:30 MSK (UTC+3) | Lutsenko 1', 68'; Rykov 13' (yellow card) 36'; Mukhametshin 15'; Djaló (yellow card) 38' (yellow-red card) 54' | Summary | Fernandes (red card) 12'; Panchenko 50'; Tošić 58'; Doumbia 59', 88'; Natcho (yellow card) 70'; Musa 80', 85' | Stadium: Start Stadium; Attendance: 7,837; Referee: Igor Nizovtsev |

| 28 September 2015 10 | Amkar Perm | 2 – 1 | Mordovia Saransk | Perm |
| 16:30 MSK (UTC+3) | Shavayev 55' (yellow card) 82'; Peev 67' (pen.); Prudnikov (yellow card) 85' | Summary | R.Mukhametshin 24'; Dudiyev (yellow card) 28'; Phibel (yellow card) 39' | Stadium: Zvezda Stadium; Attendance: 8,150; Referee: Vladislav Bezborodov |

| 3 October 2015 11 | Mordovia Saransk | 0 – 1 | Spartak Moscow | Saransk |
| 14:30 MSK (UTC+3) | Mukhametshin (yellow card) 72' | Summary | Popov 4'; Parshivlyuk (yellow card) 40'; Özbiliz (yellow card) 90+1' | Stadium: Start Stadium; Attendance: 11,575; Referee: Vladimir Moskalyov |

| 19 October 2015 12 | Rostov | 3 – 2 | Mordovia Saransk | Rostov-on-Don |
| 19:00 MSK (UTC+3) | Nakhushev 17' (o.g.); Navas (yellow card) 22'; Azmoun 83'; Bukharov 85'; Kalachou (yellow card) 90' | Summary | Phibel (yellow card) 16'; Stevanović (yellow card) 18'; Rykov 23'; Nakhushev (yellow card) 55'; Mukhametshin 58' | Stadium: Olimp-2; Attendance: 10,035; Referee: Alexey Nikolaev |

| 24 October 2015 13 | Mordovia Saransk | 1 – 1 | Kuban Krasnodar | Saransk |
| 14:30 MSK (UTC+3) | Shitov (yellow card) 21'; Rykov (yellow card) 25'; Shipitsin (yellow card) 29'; Lutsenko 59'; Makhmudov (yellow card) 84'; Le Tallec (yellow card) 90+4' | Summary | Tkachyov (yellow card) 34'; Rabiu (yellow card) 38' (yellow-red card) 66'; Baldé 63'; Tlisov (red card) 73' | Stadium: Start Stadium; Attendance: 3,324; Referee: Sergey Karasev |

| 31 October 2015 14 | Zenit St. Petersburg | 0 – 0 | Mordovia Saransk | Saint Petersburg |
| 17:00 MSK (UTC+3) | Danny (yellow card) 90+6' | Summary | Tishkin (yellow card) 72'; Makhmudov (yellow card) 73'; Revishvili (yellow card) 90+4' | Stadium: Petrovsky Stadium; Attendance: 15,647; Referee: Mikhail Vilkov |

| 6 November 2015 15 | Mordovia Saransk | 4 – 0 | Anzhi Makhachkala | Saransk |
| 19:00 MSK (UTC+3) | Vlasov 3'; Lutsenko 18', 54'; Stevanović (yellow card) 45+1'; Mukhametshin (yellow card) 60'; Djaló 69'; Dudiyev (yellow card) 71' | Summary | Zotov (yellow card) 24'; Moutari (yellow card) 29'; Khadartsev (yellow card) 73' | Stadium: Start Stadium; Attendance: 4,317; Referee: Aleksey Eskov |

| 22 November 2015 16 | Mordovia Saransk | 1 – 1 | Dynamo Moscow | Saransk |
| 14:30 MSK (UTC+3) | Phibel (yellow card) 55'; Le Tallec 75'; Sysueyev (yellow card) 89' | Report | Tashayev 35'; Pogrebnyak (yellow card) 38'; Ionov (yellow card) 82'; Sosnin (yellow card) 85' | Stadium: Start Stadium; Attendance: 5,437; Referee: Vladimir Moskalev |

| 27 November 2015 17 | Ural | 3 – 1 | Mordovia Saransk | Yekaterinburg |
| 17:00 MSK (UTC+3) | Sapeta 37', 41'; Khozin (yellow card) 57'; Fidler (yellow card) 76'; Gogniyev 83' | Summary | Phibel 23'; Le Tallec (yellow card) 38'; Djaló (yellow card) 80' | Stadium: SKB-Bank Arena; Attendance: 2,450; Referee: Vladislav Bezborodov |

| 3 December 2015 18 | Mordovia Saransk | 0 – 0 | Terek Grozny | Saransk |
| 19:00 MSK (UTC+3) | Phibel (yellow card) 11'; Lutsenko (yellow card) 68'; Shitov (yellow card) 69' | Summary | Rodolfo (yellow card) 68'; Grozav (yellow card) 71'; Kuzyayev (yellow card) 90+3' | Stadium: Start Stadium; Attendance: 4,272; Referee: Vitaly Meshkov |

| 6 March 2016 19 | Ufa | 1 – 1 | Mordovia Saransk | Ufa |
| 16:30 YEKT (UTC+5) | Marcinho (yellow card) 49'; Zinchenko (yellow card) 57'; Nikitin 90+3' | Summary | Lomić 64' (pen.) (yellow card) 86'; Mukhametshin (yellow card) 76' | Stadium: Neftyanik Stadium; Attendance: 4,150; Referee: Sergei Ivanov |

| 13 March 2016 20 | Mordovia Saransk | 0 – 1 | Krasnodar | Saransk |
| 14:30 MSK (UTC+3) | | Summary | Sigurðsson (red card) 11'; Smolov 24'; Kaboré (yellow card) 51' | Stadium: Start Stadium; Attendance: 6,313; Referee: Aleksey Eskov |

| 20 March 2016 21 | Rubin Kazan | 1 – 1 | Mordovia Saransk | Kazan |
| 18:00 MSK (UTC+3) | Karadeniz 65'; Kuzmin (yellow card) 84' | Report | Mukhametshin 18', (yellow card) 73'; Shitov (yellow card) 44' | Stadium: Kazan Arena; Attendance: 11,269; Referee: Aleksei Matyunin |

| 4 April 2016 22 | Mordovia Saransk | 1 – 2 | Krylia Sovetov | Saransk |
| 19:00 MSK (UTC+3) | Lutsenko 81'; Shitov (yellow card) 86' | Summary | Taranov 4'; Kornilenko 65'; Loria (yellow card) 90+1' | Stadium: Start Stadium; Attendance: 3,404; Referee: Igor Fedotov |

| 9 April 2016 23 | CSKA Moscow | 7 – 1 | Mordovia Saransk | Khimki |
| 13:30 MSK (UTC+3) | Shitov 3' (o.g.); Eremenko 11', 76'; Golovin 23'; Musa 25'; Ignashevich 27'; Dzagoev 78' | Summary | Stevanović (yellow card) 58'; Samodin 67'; Rykov (yellow card) 85' | Stadium: Arena Khimki; Attendance: 7,000; Referee: Mikhail Vilkov |

| 15 April 2016 24 | Mordovia Saransk | 1 – 1 | Amkar Perm | Saransk |
| 19:00 MSK (UTC+3) | Mukhametshin 53'; Rykov (yellow card) 59'; Dudiyev (yellow card) 71'; Nakhushev (yellow card) 72' | Summary | Dzhikiya 32' (yellow card) 60' | Stadium: Start Stadium; Attendance: 5,051; Referee: Kirill Levnikov |

| 23 April 2016 25 | Spartak Moscow | 2 – 2 | Mordovia Saransk | Moscow |
| 17:00 MSK (UTC+3) | Bocchetti 49' (yellow card) 80'; Promes 58'; Popov (yellow card) 77'; Zuyev (yellow card) 79' | Summary | Samodin 42'; Lutsenko 62'; Makhmudov (yellow card) 66'; Mukhametshin (yellow card) 90' | Stadium: Otkrytiye Arena; Attendance: 17,276; Referee: Vladislav Bezborodov |

| 1 May 2016 26 | Mordovia Saransk | 2 – 1 | Rostov | Saransk |
| 14:30 MSK (UTC+3) | Stevanović (yellow card) 38' (goal) 86' (pen.); Samodin 56'; Revishvili (yellow card) 74'; Dudiyev (yellow card) 78' | Summary | Azmoun 67'; Kalachou (yellow card) 71'; Navas (yellow card) 84' | Stadium: Start Stadium; Attendance: 4,113; Referee: Vladimir Moskalyov |

| 7 May 2016 27 | Kuban Krasnodar | 1 – 2 | Mordovia Saransk | Krasnodar |
| 17:00 MSK (UTC+3) | Baldé 6'; Mayrovich (yellow card) 30'; Georgiyevsky (yellow card) 83'; Pavlyuchenko (yellow card) 90+3' | Summary | Lutsenko 2'; Makhmudov (yellow card) 33'; Rykov (yellow card) 66'; Ignatovich (yellow card) 78'; Perendija 85' (yellow card) 86'; Revishvili (yellow card) 90'; Stevanović (yellow card) 90+3' | Stadium: Kuban Stadium; Attendance: 6,725; Referee: Sergei Ivanov |

| 11 May 2016 28 | Mordovia Saransk | 0 – 3 | Zenit St. Petersburg | Saransk |
| 20:30 MSK (UTC+3) | Perendija (yellow card) 69'; Cebanu (yellow card) 69' | Summary | Maurício (yellow card) 33'; Witsel 45'; Hulk 54' (pen.) 71' (pen.) | Stadium: Start Stadium; Attendance: 9,913; Referee: Aleksei Eskov |

| 15 May 2016 29 | Anzhi Makhachkala | 3 – 0 | Mordovia Saransk | Kaspiysk |
| 17:00 MSK (UTC+3) | Boli 39'; Moutari (yellow card) 42'; Mkrtchyan 57'; Musalov 90+1' | Summary | Nakhushev (yellow card) 64' | Stadium: Anzhi Arena; Attendance: 10,124; Referee: Aleksei Matyunin |

| 21 May 2016 30 | Lokomotiv Moscow | 3 – 0 | Mordovia Saransk | Moscow |
| 13:30 MSK (UTC+3) | Kolomeytsev (yellow card) 21'; Zhemaletdinov 28', 66'; Henty (yellow card) 53'; Škuletić 55' | Summary | Phibel (yellow card) 33'; Stevanović (yellow card) 59' | Stadium: Lokomotiv Stadium; Attendance: 5,110; Referee: Vladislav Bezborodov |

==== League table ====
| Pos | Team | Pld | W | D | L | GF | GA | GD | Pts | Qualification or relegation |
|---|---|---|---|---|---|---|---|---|---|---|
| 12 | Ufa | 30 | 6 | 9 | 15 | 25 | 44 | −19 | 27 | |
| 13 | Anzhi Makhachkala (O) | 30 | 6 | 8 | 16 | 28 | 50 | −22 | 26 | Qualification for the Relegation play-offs |
| 14 | Kuban Krasnodar (R) | 30 | 5 | 11 | 14 | 34 | 44 | −10 | 26 | Qualification for the Relegation play-offs |
| 15 | Dynamo Moscow (R) | 30 | 5 | 10 | 15 | 25 | 47 | −22 | 25 | Relegation to Football National League |
| 16 | Mordovia Saransk (R) | 30 | 4 | 12 | 14 | 30 | 50 | −20 | 24 | Relegation to Football National League |

Source: Russian Premier League, Soccerway
Rules for classification: 1) Points; 2) Matches won; 3) Head-to-head points; 4) Head-to-head matches won; 5) Head-to-head goal difference; 6) Head-to-head goals scored; 7) Head-to-head away goals; 8) Goal difference; 9) Goals scored; 10) Away goals scored.
(O) Play-off winners; (R) Relegated

=== Russian Cup ===
| 24 September 2015 Round of 32 | Khimki | 1 – 0 | Mordovia Saransk | Khimki |
| 19:00 MSK (UTC+3) | Chernyshov 47'; Shumskikh (yellow card) 86'; Tsitsilin (yellow card) 90' | Summary | Phibel (yellow card) 48'; Makhmudov (yellow card) 90' | Stadium: Rodina Stadium; Attendance: 3,500; Referee: Ivan Saraev |

== Squad statistics ==
As of Match played 21 May 2016

=== Appearances and goals ===
| No. | Pos | Nat | Player | Total | | Premier League | | Russian Cup | |
| No. | Pos | Nat | Player | Apps | Goals | Apps | Goals | Apps | Goals |
|---|---|---|---|---|---|---|---|---|---|
| 1 | GK | (Moldova) MDA | Ilie Cebanu | 10 | 0 | 8+1 | 0 | 1 | 0 |
| 3 | DF | (Russia) RUS | Yevgeni Gapon | 12 | 0 | 10+1 | 0 | 1 | 0 |
| 4 | DF | (Netherlands) NED | Igor Shitov | 18 | 0 | 16+1 | 0 | 1 | 0 |
| 5 | DF | (Georgia (country)) GEO | Mamuka Kobakhidze | 2 | 0 | 0+1 | 0 | 1 | 0 |
| 8 | MF | (Russia) RUS | Anton Bobyor | 11 | 0 | 5+5 | 0 | 1 | 0 |
| 10 | FW | (Russia) RUS | Pavel Ignatovich | 19 | 0 | 2+16 | 0 | 1 | 0 |
| 13 | FW | (Russia) RUS | Mikhail Markin | 1 | 0 | 0+1 | 0 | 0 | 0 |
| 15 | MF | (Russia) RUS | Emin Makhmudov | 19 | 0 | 16+2 | 0 | 1 | 0 |
| 16 | MF | (Slovenia) SLO | Dalibor Stevanović | 28 | 2 | 26+1 | 2 | 0+1 | 0 |
| 17 | DF | (Russia) RUS | Aslan Dudiyev | 27 | 0 | 24+2 | 0 | 1 | 0 |
| 22 | FW | (Russia) RUS | Sergey Samodin | 18 | 3 | 12+5 | 3 | 1 | 0 |
| 23 | FW | (Russia) RUS | Ruslan Mukhametshin | 28 | 6 | 26+2 | 6 | 0 | 0 |
| 25 | MF | (Russia) RUS | Yevgeni Shipitsin | 14 | 0 | 4+9 | 0 | 1 | 0 |
| 32 | DF | (Serbia) SRB | Marko Lomić | 7 | 1 | 7 | 1 | 0 | 0 |
| 33 | DF | (Russia) RUS | Vladimir Rykov | 27 | 2 | 27 | 2 | 0 | 0 |
| 40 | DF | (Serbia) SRB | Milan Perendija | 10 | 1 | 7+3 | 1 | 0 | 0 |
| 48 | FW | (Russia) RUS | Yevgeni Lutsenko | 27 | 10 | 20+7 | 10 | 0 | 0 |
| 55 | DF | (Russia) RUS | Ruslan Nakhushev | 26 | 0 | 26 | 0 | 0 | 0 |
| 57 | FW | (Russia) RUS | Ruslan Navlyotov | 2 | 0 | 0+2 | 0 | 0 | 0 |
| 71 | DF | (Russia) RUS | Maksim Tishkin | 18 | 0 | 15+3 | 0 | 0 | 0 |
| 77 | GK | (Georgia (country)) GEO | Nukri Revishvili | 22 | 0 | 22 | 0 | 0 | 0 |
| 84 | MF | (Russia) RUS | Oleg Vlasov | 31 | 1 | 26+4 | 1 | 0+1 | 0 |
| 88 | MF | (Russia) RUS | Aleksei Ivanov | 14 | 0 | 7+6 | 0 | 1 | 0 |
| 97 | DF | (France) FRA | Thomas Phibel | 18 | 1 | 17 | 1 | 1 | 0 |
Players away from the club on loan:
Players who appeared for Mordovia Saransk no longer at the club:
| 6 | MF | (Netherlands) NED | Mitchell Donald | 2 | 1 | 2 | 1 | 0 | 0 |
| 7 | MF | (France) FRA | Damien Le Tallec | 15 | 1 | 13+2 | 1 | 0 | 0 |
| 11 | MF | (Russia) RUS | Dmitri Sysuyev | 9 | 0 | 1+8 | 0 | 0 | 0 |
| 20 | FW | (Portugal) POR | Yannick Djaló | 8 | 1 | 2+5 | 1 | 0+1 | 0 |

=== Goal scorers ===
| Place | Position | Nation | Number | Name | Russian Premier League | Russian Cup | Total |
|---|---|---|---|---|---|---|---|
| 1 | FW | (Russia) | 48 | Yevgeni Lutsenko | 10 | 0 | 10 |
| 2 | FW | (Russia) | 23 | Ruslan Mukhametshin | 6 | 0 | 6 |
| 3 | FW | (Russia) | 22 | Sergey Samodin | 3 | 0 | 3 |
| 4 | MF | (Slovenia) | 16 | Dalibor Stevanović | 2 | 0 | 2 |
| 4 | DF | (Russia) | 33 | Vladimir Rykov | 2 | 0 | 2 |
| 6 | MF | (Netherlands) | 6 | Mitchell Donald | 1 | 0 | 1 |
| 6 | MF | (Russia) | 84 | Oleg Vlasov | 1 | 0 | 1 |
| 6 | FW | (Portugal) | 20 | Yannick Djaló | 1 | 0 | 1 |
| 6 | MF | (France) | 7 | Damien Le Tallec | 1 | 0 | 1 |
| 6 | DF | (Russia) | 97 | Thomas Phibel | 1 | 0 | 1 |
| 6 | DF | (Serbia) | 32 | Marko Lomić | 1 | 0 | 1 |
| 6 | DF | (Serbia) | 40 | Milan Perendija | 1 | 0 | 1 |
| | | | | TOTALS | 30 | 0 | 30 |

=== Disciplinary record ===
| Number | Nation | Position | Name | Russian Premier League | | Russian Cup | | Total | |
| Number | Nation | Position | Name | Yellow card | Red card | Yellow card | Red card | Yellow card | Red card |
| 1 | (Moldova) | GK | Ilie Cebanu | 1 | 0 | 0 | 0 | 1 | 0 |
| 3 | (Russia) | DF | Yevgeni Gapon | 1 | 0 | 0 | 0 | 1 | 0 |
| 4 | (Belarus) | DF | Igor Shitov | 7 | 0 | 0 | 0 | 7 | 0 |
| 6 | (Netherlands) | MF | Mitchell Donald | 1 | 0 | 0 | 0 | 1 | 0 |
| 7 | (France) | MF | Damien Le Tallec | 4 | 0 | 0 | 0 | 4 | 0 |
| 10 | (Russia) | FW | Pavel Ignatovich | 1 | 0 | 0 | 0 | 1 | 0 |
| 15 | (Russia) | MF | Emin Makhmudov | 4 | 0 | 1 | 0 | 5 | 0 |
| 16 | (Slovenia) | MF | Dalibor Stevanović | 9 | 0 | 0 | 0 | 9 | 0 |
| 17 | (Russia) | DF | Aslan Dudiyev | 4 | 0 | 0 | 0 | 4 | 0 |
| 20 | (Portugal) | FW | Yannick Djaló | 3 | 1 | 0 | 0 | 3 | 1 |
| 23 | (Russia) | FW | Ruslan Mukhametshin | 7 | 0 | 0 | 0 | 7 | 0 |
| 25 | (Russia) | MF | Yevgeni Shipitsin | 1 | 0 | 0 | 0 | 1 | 0 |
| 32 | (Serbia) | DF | Marko Lomić | 1 | 0 | 0 | 0 | 1 | 0 |
| 33 | (Russia) | DF | Vladimir Rykov | 5 | 0 | 0 | 0 | 5 | 0 |
| 40 | (Serbia) | DF | Milan Perendija | 1 | 0 | 0 | 0 | 1 | 0 |
| 48 | (Russia) | FW | Yevgeni Lutsenko | 2 | 0 | 0 | 0 | 2 | 0 |
| 55 | (Russia) | DF | Ruslan Nakhushev | 7 | 0 | 0 | 0 | 7 | 0 |
| 71 | (Russia) | DF | Maksim Tishkin | 1 | 0 | 0 | 0 | 1 | 0 |
| 77 | (Georgia (country)) | GK | Nukri Revishvili | 3 | 0 | 0 | 0 | 3 | 0 |
| 97 | (France) | DF | Thomas Phibel | 5 | 0 | 1 | 0 | 6 | 0 |
| | | | TOTALS | 68 | 1 | 2 | 0 | 70 | 1 |
