= List of Russian football transfers summer 2014 =

This is a list of Russian football transfers in the summer transfer window 2014 by club. Only clubs of the 2014–15 Russian Premier League are included.

== Russian Premier League 2014-15 ==
=== Amkar Perm ===
In: Note: Flags indicate national team as defined under FIFA eligibility rules; some limited exceptions apply. Players may hold more than one non-FIFA nationality.

No.	Pos.	Nation	Player
8	MF	RUS	Igor Kireyev (on loan from Rostov)
11	FW	MKD	Marko Simonovski (from (North Macedonia) Metalurg Skopje)
13	MF	BLR	Syarhey Balanovich (from (Belarus) Shakhtyor Soligorsk)
15	MF	LVA	Vladimirs Kamešs (end of loan to Neftekhimik Nizhnekamsk)
16	DF	RUS	Brian Idowu (end of loan to Dynamo St. Petersburg)
17	MF	RUS	David Dzakhov (from Neftekhimik Nizhnekamsk)
22	MF	RUS	Alikhan Shavayev (from Spartak Nalchik)
27	FW	RUS	Vladislav Shpitalny (from Rubin Kazan)
29	DF	RUS	Rinat Guseynov
33	MF	SRB	Branko Jovičić (from (Serbia) Borac Čačak)
35	MF	RUS	Aykaz Zilabyan
73	MF	RUS	Dmitri Opachev
88	FW	RUS	Pavel Solomatin (on loan from Dynamo Moscow)
92	MF	RUS	Valeri Kuznetsov
99	FW	RUS	Aleksandr Subbotin (end of loan to Tambov)
—	GK	RUS	Aleksandr Selikhov (from Oryol, previously on loan)

Out: Note: Flags indicate national team as defined under FIFA eligibility rules; some limited exceptions apply. Players may hold more than one non-FIFA nationality.

No.	Pos.	Nation	Player
4	DF	RUS	Dzhamaldin Khodzhaniyazov (end of loan from Zenit St. Petersburg)
7	MF	BUL	Blagoy Georgiev (to Rubin Kazan)
10	MF	RUS	Aleksei Rebko (to Rostov)
17	MF	EST	Konstantin Vassiljev (to (Poland) Piast Gliwice)
20	MF	RUS	Dmitri Kayumov (end of loan from Spartak Moscow)
27	GK	RUS	Stanislav Cherchesov Jr. (to Dynamo Moscow)
32	MF	NED	Gianluca Nijholt (released)
34	DF	RUS	Ilya Krichmar (to SKChF Sevastopol)
45	DF	RUS	Andrei Pridyuk (on loan to Tambov)
50	DF	RUS	Mikhail Smirnov (to Tosno)
67	GK	RUS	Aslan Gagkayev (to Dynamo Bryansk)
68	GK	RUS	Ivan Konovalov (to SKChF Sevastopol)
69	MF	RUS	Soslan Tsgoyev
70	MF	GHA	Patrick Twumasi (end of loan from (Latvia) Spartaks Jūrmala)
79	FW	RUS	Kirill Zabotin
85	MF	SVK	Michal Breznaník (to (Czech Republic) Sparta Prague)
89	FW	BLR	Kirill Sidorenko (on loan to (Belarus) Vitebsk)
93	MF	RUS	Ivan Solovyov (end of loan from Zenit St. Petersburg)
99	FW	RUS	Maksim Kanunnikov (to Rubin Kazan)
—	MF	RUS	Aleksandr Pantsyrev (on loan to Neftekhimik Nizhnekamsk, previously on loan to Oktan Perm)
—	MF	RUS	Artur Ryabokobylenko (to Tosno, previously on loan to Spartak Nalchik)

=== Arsenal Tula ===
In: Note: Flags indicate national team as defined under FIFA eligibility rules; some limited exceptions apply. Players may hold more than one non-FIFA nationality.

No.	Pos.	Nation	Player
7	MF	RUS	Aleksandr Zotov (on loan from Spartak Moscow)
13	DF	RUS	Vladimir Mazov (from Arsenal-2 Tula)
15	MF	RUS	Vitali Orlov (from Arsenal-2 Tula)
17	MF	RUS	Ivan Baklanov (on loan from Rostov)
19	DF	RUS	Yevgeni Osipov (from Ufa)
22	DF	SVK	Lukáš Tesák (from Torpedo Moscow)
25	FW	RUS	Marat Gubzhev (from Arsenal-2 Tula)
26	FW	RUS	Arkadi Lobzin (from Arsenal-2 Tula)
29	MF	RUS	Aleksei Gogiya (from Arsenal-2 Tula)
31	MF	RUS	Aleksandr Shmarov
32	DF	RUS	Nikita Sorokin (from Arsenal-2 Tula)
33	MF	RUS	Aleksandr Kotenko (from Arsenal-2 Tula)
35	DF	RUS	Maksim Biryulin
36	GK	RUS	Mikhail Levashov (from Arsenal-2 Tula)
37	DF	RUS	Dmitri Tsukanov
38	FW	RUS	Artur Maloyan (on loan from Shinnik Yaroslavl)
39	DF	RUS	Irakli Chezhiya (from Arsenal-2 Tula)
40	DF	RUS	Pavel Borisov
41	GK	RUS	Maksim Staroverov (from Arsenal-2 Tula)
42	FW	RUS	Andrei Zolotoy
44	DF	RUS	Yuri Medvedev (from Arsenal-2 Tula)
45	FW	RUS	Saveliy Larichkin
46	GK	RUS	Sergei Kuziyev
49	MF	RUS	Artyom Mingazov (from Khimik Novomoskovsk)
50	DF	RUS	Nikita Abramov (from Arsenal-2 Tula)
51	MF	RUS	Aleksei Yurchak
54	FW	RUS	Aleksandr Zakarlyuka (from Volga Nizhny Novgorod)
55	DF	RUS	Artur Farion (from Arsenal-2 Tula)
57	MF	RUS	Vladislav Zotov (from Dolgoprudny)
61	GK	RUS	Anton Ilyin
66	DF	RUS	Aleksandr Karasyov
68	MF	RUS	Artyom Zhabin
69	FW	RUS	Pavel Belyanin (from Arsenal-2 Tula)
71	MF	RUS	Aleksandr Zharinov (from Arsenal-2 Tula)
73	MF	RUS	Renat Gagity (from (Lithuania) Kruoja Pakruojis)
75	DF	RUS	Yevgeni Alfyorov (on loan from Zenit St. Petersburg)
78	MF	RUS	Anton Babushkin
79	MF	RUS	Aleksandr Gordiyenko (from Arsenal-2 Tula)
80	DF	RUS	Rustam Normatov
81	MF	RUS	Roman Salimov (from Kuban Krasnodar)
86	FW	RUS	Leonid Boyev (from Arsenal-2 Tula)
87	GK	RUS	Aleksandr Leykin
89	MF	RUS	Dmitri Starodub (from (Latvia) Skonto)
91	FW	RUS	Roman Izotov
92	DF	RUS	Andrei Nalyotov (from Volga Nizhny Novgorod)
93	DF	RUS	Aleksei Makorin
94	DF	RUS	Aleksandr Matrenov
95	FW	RUS	Sergei Stepanov (from Arsenal-2 Tula)
96	GK	RUS	Aleksandr Puchkov
97	MF	RUS	Denis Skoropupov
98	MF	RUS	Dmitri Fedchenko
99	FW	RUS	Maxim Votinov (from Baltika Kaliningrad)

Out: Note: Flags indicate national team as defined under FIFA eligibility rules; some limited exceptions apply. Players may hold more than one non-FIFA nationality.

No.	Pos.	Nation	Player
13	DF	MNE	Predrag Kašćelan (to Khimik Dzerzhinsk)
19	MF	RUS	Dmitri Shilov (on loan to Khimik Dzerzhinsk)
22	DF	RUS	Rinat Timokhin
92	MF	RUS	Aleksandr Kotenko (to Arsenal-2 Tula)
—	MF	RUS	Vitali Orlov (to Arsenal-2 Tula, previously on loan to Kaluga)

=== CSKA Moscow ===
In: Note: Flags indicate national team as defined under FIFA eligibility rules; some limited exceptions apply. Players may hold more than one non-FIFA nationality.

No.	Pos.	Nation	Player
8	FW	RUS	Kirill Panchenko (from Tom Tomsk)
25	MF	FIN	Roman Eremenko (from Rubin Kazan)
41	GK	RUS	Pavel Mayorov
52	MF	RUS	Igor Drykov (from Lokomotiv Moscow school)
62	DF	RUS	Denis Nikitin
63	DF	RUS	Yegor Matunov
64	DF	RUS	Mutalip Alibekov
66	MF	ISR	Bibras Natcho (from (Greece) PAOK)
67	MF	RUS	Denis Glukhov
68	FW	RUS	Nikita Kasatkin
72	MF	RUS	Astemir Gordyushenko
73	MF	RUS	Dmitri Sokolov
74	FW	RUS	Savva Knyazev
75	FW	RUS	Timur Zhamaletdinov
86	MF	RUS	Elgyun Ulukhanov

Out: Note: Flags indicate national team as defined under FIFA eligibility rules; some limited exceptions apply. Players may hold more than one non-FIFA nationality.

No.	Pos.	Nation	Player
5	DF	RUS	Viktor Vasin (on loan to Mordovia Saransk)
8	MF	SUI	Steven Zuber (to (Germany) TSG Hoffenheim)
25	MF	BIH	Elvir Rahimić (retired)
39	DF	RUS	Vyacheslav Karavayev (on loan to (Czech Republic) Dukla Prague)
40	MF	RUS	Yuri Bavin (to (Portugal) União de Leiria)
50	FW	RUS	Sergei Seredin (to Strogino Moscow)
70	MF	RUS	Armen Ambartsumyan (on loan to Zenit Penza)
80	MF	RUS	David Khurtsidze (to (Armenia) Ulisses)
82	DF	RUS	Pyotr Yanzin (to Tekstilshchik Ivanovo)
84	GK	RUS	Ilya Samorukov
97	MF	RUS	Dmitri Litvinov (to Torpedo Moscow)
—	GK	RUS	Vyacheslav Isupov (released, previously on loan to Lokomotiv-2 Moscow)
—	DF	RUS	Anton Polyutkin (to Solyaris Moscow, previously on loan to Yenisey Krasnoyarsk)
—	DF	RUS	Pyotr Ten (on loan to Anzhi Makhachkala, previously on loan to Rotor Volgograd)
—	MF	RUS	Yegor Ivanov (to Yenisey Krasnoyarsk, previously on loan)
—	MF	RUS	Ravil Netfullin (to Solyaris Moscow, previously on loan to Fakel Voronezh)
—	MF	LBR	Sekou Oliseh (on loan to Kuban Krasnodar, previously on loan to (Greece) PAOK)
—	MF	RUS	Aleksandr Stolyarenko (to Sokol Saratov, previously on loan)
—	FW	RUS	Ilya Belous (to Krasnodar, previously on loan to Lokomotiv-2 Moscow)
—	FW	CZE	Tomáš Necid (on loan to (Netherlands) PEC Zwolle, previously on loan to (Czech Republic) Slavia Prague)

=== Dynamo Moscow ===
In: Note: Flags indicate national team as defined under FIFA eligibility rules; some limited exceptions apply. Players may hold more than one non-FIFA nationality.

No.	Pos.	Nation	Player
3	DF	NED	Alexander Büttner (from (England) Manchester United)
6	MF	FRA	William Vainqueur (from (Belgium) Standard Liège)
10	FW	RUS	Fyodor Smolov (end of loan to Anzhi Makhachkala)
14	MF	FRA	Mathieu Valbuena (from (France) Marseille)
15	DF	SVK	Tomáš Hubočan (from Zenit St. Petersburg)
23	DF	BUL	Stanislav Manolev (from Kuban Krasnodar)
24	MF	UKR	Borys Tashchy (end of loan to (Ukraine) Hoverla Uzhhorod)
33	DF	RUS	Andrius Rukas (from Sibir-2 Novosibirsk)
43	GK	RUS	Stanislav Cherchesov Jr. (from Amkar Perm)
61	DF	RUS	Semyon Matviychuk
62	DF	RUS	Nikita Kalugin
64	DF	RUS	Aleksandr Shchegolkov
65	MF	RUS	Daniil Yamshchikov
67	MF	RUS	Pavel Farafonov
68	DF	RUS	Denis Sidnev
69	MF	RUS	Nikita Kireyev
73	DF	RUS	Sergei Yevtushenko
74	DF	RUS	Nikita Klimov
78	FW	RUS	Ruslan Suanov
83	GK	RUS	Andrei Rebrikov
84	GK	RUS	Ivan Zirikov
92	FW	RUS	Maksim Obolskiy
98	MF	RUS	Anton Terekhov
99	FW	RUS	Aleksandr Prudnikov (from Rubin Kazan)

Out: Note: Flags indicate national team as defined under FIFA eligibility rules; some limited exceptions apply. Players may hold more than one non-FIFA nationality.

No.	Pos.	Nation	Player
6	DF	ARG	Leandro Fernández (to (Argentina) Newell's Old Boys)
10	MF	UKR	Andriy Voronin (released)
10	FW	RUS	Fyodor Smolov (on loan to Ural Sverdlovsk Oblast)
11	MF	RUS	Alan Kasaev (end of loan from Rubin Kazan)
14	FW	RUS	Pavel Solomatin (on loan to Amkar Perm)
17	MF	RUS	Alan Gatagov (released)
19	GK	RUS	Yevgeni Frolov (to Sakhalin Yuzhno-Sakhalinsk)
21	MF	ROU	George Florescu (to (Romania) Astra Giurgiu)
23	DF	AUS	Luke Wilkshire (to (Netherlands) Feyenoord)
24	MF	UKR	Borys Tashchy (to (Germany) Stuttgart II)
25	FW	RUS	Vladimir Dyadyun (to Rubin Kazan)
30	GK	RUS	Yegor Generalov (on loan to Saturn Ramenskoye)
32	DF	SRB	Marko Lomić (to Mordovia Saransk)
58	MF	RUS	Dmitri Vlasov
59	MF	RUS	Aleksandr Ilyin (on loan to Sakhalin Yuzhno-Sakhalinsk)
61	MF	FIN	Moshtagh Yaghoubi (end of loan from (Latvia) Spartaks Jūrmala)
67	GK	RUS	Aleksandr Yudin
74	DF	RUS	Dmitri Skopintsev (to Zenit St. Petersburg)
—	DF	RUS	Vladimir Rykov (to Torpedo Moscow, previously on loan to Tom Tomsk)
—	MF	RUS	Pavel Ignatovich (to Mordovia Saransk, previously on loan to Tom Tomsk)
—	MF	RUS	Aleksandr Sapeta (to Ural Sverdlovsk Oblast, previously on loan)
—	MF	RUS	Vladimir Sobolev (to Rubin Kazan, previously on loan to Anzhi Makhachkala)
—	FW	RUS	Andrei Panyukov (on loan to Baltika Kaliningrad, previously on loan to Spartak Nalchik)

=== Krasnodar ===
In: Note: Flags indicate national team as defined under FIFA eligibility rules; some limited exceptions apply. Players may hold more than one non-FIFA nationality.

No.	Pos.	Nation	Player
10	MF	UZB	Odil Ahmedov (from Anzhi Makhachkala)
11	MF	RUS	Marat Izmailov (on loan from (Portugal) Porto)
18	MF	RUS	Vladimir Bystrov (from Zenit St. Petersburg)
19	FW	RUS	Nikita Burmistrov (from Anzhi Makhachkala)
20	MF	RUS	Ruslan Adzhindzhal (from Krylia Sovetov Samara)
31	GK	UKR	Andriy Dykan (from Spartak Moscow)
46	DF	RUS	Vitali Stezhko
56	FW	RUS	Ilya Belous (from CSKA Moscow)
65	FW	RUS	Boris Shavlokhov
66	GK	RUS	Denis Adamov
67	GK	RUS	Maksim Zamyshlyayev
75	FW	RUS	Levon Bayramyan
77	FW	SEN	Moussa Konaté (end of loan to (Italy) Genoa)
87	DF	RUS	Arutyun Grigoryan
92	DF	RUS	Aleksei Shatokhin
95	FW	RUS	Aslan Vershinin
99	FW	RUS	Vladislav Bragin

Out: Note: Flags indicate national team as defined under FIFA eligibility rules; some limited exceptions apply. Players may hold more than one non-FIFA nationality.

No.	Pos.	Nation	Player
3	DF	SRB	Dušan Anđelković
15	MF	RUS	Roman Shirokov (end of loan from Zenit St. Petersburg)
16	MF	RUS	Aleksei Pomerko (on loan to Krylia Sovetov Samara)
19	MF	BRA	Isael (to (Kazakhstan) Kairat)
23	GK	RUS	Aleksandr Filtsov (to Rubin Kazan)
26	MF	POR	Márcio Abreu (to Torpedo Moscow)
29	FW	CIV	Gerard Gohou (to (Kazakhstan) Kairat)
35	MF	RUS	Oleg Samsonov (to Tyumen)
46	DF	RUS	Andrei Gamalyan (on loan to (Armenia) Shirak)
52	DF	RUS	Ramil Zyabirov
55	DF	SRB	Nemanja Tubić (to (Belarus) BATE Borisov)
56	DF	RUS	Sergei Khmelevskoy (to MITOS Novocherkassk)
59	MF	RUS	Kirill Morozov (on loan to Afips Afipsky)
67	DF	RUS	Oleg Mikhaylov (to Spartak Nalchik)
75	MF	RUS	Khasan Akhriyev (on loan to Spartak Nalchik)
77	FW	SEN	Moussa Konaté (to (Switzerland) Sion)
99	FW	RUS	Vladislav Bragin
—	MF	RUS	Nika Chkhapeliya (to Rostov, previously on loan to Spartak Nalchik)
—	MF	MDA	Valeriu Ciupercă (to Anzhi Makhachkala, previously on loan to Spartak Nalchik)
—	MF	HUN	Vladimir Koman (released, previously on loan to Ural Sverdlovsk Oblast)
—	MF	RUS	Igor Lambarschi (to Ural Sverdlovsk Oblast, previously on loan to Yenisey Krasnoyarsk)
—	FW	RUS	Khyzyr Appayev (to Gazovik Orenburg, previously on loan to Rotor Volgograd)
—	FW	RUS	Ruslan Bolov (on loan to Volgar Astrakhan, previously on loan to Spartak Nalchik)

=== Kuban Krasnodar ===
In: Note: Flags indicate national team as defined under FIFA eligibility rules; some limited exceptions apply. Players may hold more than one non-FIFA nationality.

No.	Pos.	Nation	Player
7	MF	RUS	Vladislav Kulik (on loan from Rubin Kazan)
13	GK	RUS	Yevgeny Pomazan (on loan from Anzhi Makhachkala)
14	DF	BIH	Toni Šunjić (from (Ukraine) Zorya Luhansk)
19	FW	BRA	Danilo (on loan from (Ukraine) Zorya Luhansk)
26	MF	LBR	Sekou Oliseh (on loan from CSKA Moscow)
38	DF	RUS	Andrey Yeshchenko (on loan from Anzhi Makhachkala)
42	MF	RUS	Sergey Karetnik (end of loan to (Ukraine) Metalurh Donetsk)
47	DF	RUS	Artur Akhmedzhanov
67	DF	RUS	Nikolai Kostenko
68	DF	RUS	Anatoli Khubezhov
72	MF	RUS	Igor Konovalov (from Spartak Moscow)
84	DF	RUS	Aleksandr Kleshchenko (from Alania-d Vladikavkaz)
87	MF	RUS	Islam Tsaniyev
91	MF	RUS	Anton Moiseyev
93	DF	RUS	Soslan Kagermazov (from Progress Timashyovsk)

Out: Note: Flags indicate national team as defined under FIFA eligibility rules; some limited exceptions apply. Players may hold more than one non-FIFA nationality.

No.	Pos.	Nation	Player
5	DF	ESP	Ángel Dealbert (to (United Arab Emirates) Baniyas)
14	MF	RUS	Nikita Bezlikhotnov (to Ufa)
21	FW	CRC	Marco Ureña (on loan to (Denmark) Midtjylland)
25	DF	BUL	Stanislav Manolev (to Dynamo Moscow)
30	GK	MDA	Alexei Coşelev (to (Moldova) Saxan)
47	MF	RUS	Vyacheslav Kalinkin (to Torpedo Moscow)
62	DF	RUS	Sergei Khachaturyan (to Torpedo Armavir)
67	DF	RUS	Georgi Tigiyev (to Torpedo Moscow)
68	FW	RUS	Roman Salimov (to Arsenal Tula)
72	MF	RUS	Yegor Rudkovskiy (to Chertanovo Moscow)
75	GK	RUS	Arsen Siukayev (to Kaluga)
77	DF	RUS	Vladimir Lobkaryov (to Torpedo Armavir)
80	MF	RUS	Ruslan Kausarov (to Rubin Kazan)
81	MF	RUS	Temuri Bukiya (to Volgar Astrakhan)
84	DF	RUS	Vasili Pinchuk (to Dynamo St. Petersburg)
87	FW	RUS	Nikita Vorona
91	MF	RUS	Konstantin Kertanov (to Torpedo Moscow)
96	DF	RUS	Oleg Tolmasov (to Alania Vladikavkaz)
98	MF	RUS	Anton Zinkovskiy (to Chertanovo Moscow)
—	MF	RUS	Albert Sharipov (to Tom Tomsk, previously on loan to Fakel Voronezh)
—	MF	RUS	Mikhail Komkov (to Tom Tomsk, previously on loan)

=== Lokomotiv Moscow ===
In: Note: Flags indicate national team as defined under FIFA eligibility rules; some limited exceptions apply. Players may hold more than one non-FIFA nationality.

No.	Pos.	Nation	Player
3	MF	RUS	Alan Kasaev (from Rubin Kazan)
4	MF	POR	Manuel Fernandes (from (Turkey) Besiktas)
5	DF	SRB	Nemanja Pejčinović (from (France) Nice)
15	DF	RUS	Arseniy Logashov (end of loan to Rostov)
16	GK	RUS	Ilya Lantratov (from Lokomotiv-2 Moscow)
21	FW	SEN	Baye Oumar Niasse (from (Turkey) Akhisar Belediyespor)
38	GK	RUS	Aleksandr Akishin
44	DF	RUS	Aleksandr Logunov (from Rostov)
46	MF	RUS	Artyom Vyatkin
56	DF	RUS	Tomas Rukas (from Sibir-2 Novosibirsk)
61	GK	RUS	Maksim Danilyants
95	FW	RUS	Nozim Babadzhanov (from Rubin Kazan)
96	GK	RUS	Ilya Ishchenko
97	FW	RUS	Grigori Gerasimov (from LFK Lokomotiv Moscow)
98	MF	RUS	Ivan Galanin

Out: Note: Flags indicate national team as defined under FIFA eligibility rules; some limited exceptions apply. Players may hold more than one non-FIFA nationality.

No.	Pos.	Nation	Player
4	MF	ESP	Alberto Zapater (not registered with the league)
6	MF	RUS	Maksim Grigoryev (on loan to Rostov)
16	GK	RUS	Aleksei Shirokov (end of loan from Lokomotiv-2 Moscow)
27	MF	RUS	Magomed Ozdoev (on loan to Rubin Kazan)
34	DF	RUS	Mikhail Martynov (to Rostov)
38	MF	RUS	Nikita Salamatov (to Khimki)
62	FW	RUS	Yevgeni Voronin (to LFK Lokomotiv Moscow)
64	MF	RUS	Sergei Serchenkov (to Ural Sverdlovsk Oblast)
65	GK	RUS	Vitali Kharchenko
67	DF	RUS	Temur Mustafin (to Rostov)
69	MF	RUS	Vladislav Semyonov (to Torpedo Moscow)
79	DF	RUS	Vitali Lystsov
85	MF	FRA	Lassana Diarra (not registered with the league)
86	FW	RUS	Mikhail Pogonin (to Torpedo Moscow)
90	MF	RUS	Aleksandr Lomakin (on loan to Yenisey Krasnoyarsk)
92	FW	RUS	Aleksei Turik (to Fakel Voronezh)
97	GK	RUS	Yuri Kostrikov
—	DF	RUS	Igor Golban (to Sochi, previously on loan to Khimki)
—	MF	NGA	Victor Obinna (not registered with the league, previously on loan to (Italy) ChievoVerona)
—	MF	RUS	Vyacheslav Podberyozkin (to Ural Sverdlovsk Oblast, previously on loan to Khimki)
—	FW	RUS	Mikhail Petrusyov (to Dnepr Smolensk, previously on loan)
—	FW	RUS	Dmitri Sychev (not registered with the league, previously on loan to Volga Nizhny Novgorod)

=== Mordovia Saransk ===
In: Note: Flags indicate national team as defined under FIFA eligibility rules; some limited exceptions apply. Players may hold more than one non-FIFA nationality.

No.	Pos.	Nation	Player
5	DF	RUS	Viktor Vasin (on loan from CSKA Moscow)
6	MF	NED	Mitchell Donald (from (Netherlands) Roda)
7	FW	FRA	Damien Le Tallec (from (Ukraine) Hoverla Uzhhorod)
10	MF	BEL	Danilo (from (Ukraine) Metalurh Donetsk)
11	FW	RUS	Dmitri Sysuyev (from Baltika Kaliningrad)
17	DF	RUS	Aslan Dudiyev (from SKA-Energiya Khabarovsk)
18	MF	SEN	Baye Ibrahima Niasse (from (Azerbaijan) Gabala)
20	MF	UKR	Matvey Guyganov (from (Ukraine) Sevastopol)
23	FW	RUS	Ruslan Mukhametshin (on loan from Rubin Kazan)
25	GK	MDA	Ilie Cebanu (from Tom Tomsk)
32	DF	SRB	Marko Lomić (from Dynamo Moscow)
41	GK	RUS	Aleksandr Popov
42	DF	RUS	Nikita Usov
43	DF	RUS	Aleksei Chubukin
44	DF	RUS	Sergei Shirshikov
45	DF	RUS	Aleksandr Tenyayev
46	DF	RUS	Zaur Alborov
47	MF	RUS	Alen Askerov
49	MF	RUS	Timon Abbakumov
50	MF	RUS	Dmitri Larin
51	MF	RUS	Yevgeni Zimin
52	MF	RUS	Timur Sultanov
53	MF	RUS	Timur Raimov
54	MF	RUS	Artur Igoshev
56	MF	RUS	Vladislav Adayev
57	MF	RUS	Ruslan Navlyotov
58	MF	RUS	Aleksandr Shinkarenko
59	FW	RUS	Andrei Malanyin
60	FW	RUS	Vladimir Zmeyov
61	GK	RUS	Aleksei Varlamov
62	FW	RUS	Oleg Kachmazov
64	MF	RUS	Andrei Yemelin
65	MF	RUS	Aleksei Larin
67	DF	RUS	David Ozmanov
68	DF	RUS	Farid Kutbeyev
84	MF	RUS	Oleg Vlasov (from Torpedo Moscow)
91	MF	NED	Lorenzo Ebecilio (on loan from (Ukraine) Metalurh Donetsk)
99	FW	RUS	Pavel Ignatovich (from Dynamo Moscow)

Out: Note: Flags indicate national team as defined under FIFA eligibility rules; some limited exceptions apply. Players may hold more than one non-FIFA nationality.

No.	Pos.	Nation	Player
2	DF	RUS	Maksim Budnikov (to Neftekhimik Nizhnekamsk)
5	DF	RUS	Ismail Ediyev (to SKA-Energiya Khabarovsk)
7	MF	RUS	Sergei Vaganov (to Luch-Energiya Vladivostok)
11	MF	RUS	Maksim Rogov (to Dynamo St. Petersburg)
15	MF	RUS	Aleksandr Dimidko (to Tom Tomsk)
18	MF	RUS	Vadim Gagloyev (to Yenisey Krasnoyarsk)
20	FW	RUS	Sergey Samodin (to Shinnik Yaroslavl)
24	MF	RUS	Andrei Pazin (to Tosno)
35	DF	GEO	Akaki Khubutia (to (Israel) Hapoel Petah Tikva)
73	MF	RUS	Maksim Terentyev (to TSK Simferopol)
—	DF	RUS	Radik Yusupov (to Neftekhimik Nizhnekamsk, previously on loan to Volga Tver)
—	MF	RUS	Denis Sobolev (to Neftekhimik Nizhnekamsk, previously on loan to Zenit Penza)

=== Rostov ===
In: Note: Flags indicate national team as defined under FIFA eligibility rules; some limited exceptions apply. Players may hold more than one non-FIFA nationality.

No.	Pos.	Nation	Player
3	DF	RUS	Ruslan Abazov (from Spartak Nalchik)
4	MF	RUS	Dmitri Torbinski (from Rubin Kazan)
6	MF	RUS	Aleksei Rebko (from Amkar Perm)
7	MF	RUS	Maksim Grigoryev (on loan from Lokomotiv Moscow)
8	MF	MLI	Moussa Doumbia (from (Mali) Real Bamako)
11	FW	RUS	Aleksandr Bukharov (from Zenit St. Petersburg)
15	DF	BLR	Maksim Bardachow (on loan from Tom Tomsk)
17	MF	RUS	Nika Chkhapeliya (from Krasnodar)
20	MF	HAI	Réginal Goreux (from Krylia Sovetov Samara)
23	MF	RUS	Aleksandr Troshechkin (from Anzhi Makhachkala)
35	GK	RUS	Soslan Dzhanayev
50	MF	RUS	Nikolai Stankevich
59	DF	RUS	Mikhail Martynov (from Lokomotiv Moscow)
80	MF	RUS	Denis Mashkin
—	DF	RUS	Temur Mustafin (from Lokomotiv Moscow)

Out: Note: Flags indicate national team as defined under FIFA eligibility rules; some limited exceptions apply. Players may hold more than one non-FIFA nationality.

No.	Pos.	Nation	Player
7	MF	RUS	Georgy Gabulov (to Krylia Sovetov Samara)
8	MF	UKR	Ihor Khudobyak (end of loan from (Ukraine) Karpaty Lviv)
10	FW	RUS	Artyom Dzyuba (end of loan from Spartak Moscow)
12	GK	RUS	Artyom Orsayev
13	FW	RUS	Maksim Lepskiy (to Khimki)
24	FW	FRA	Florent Sinama Pongolle (released)
25	DF	RUS	Arseniy Logashov (end of loan from Lokomotiv Moscow)
32	MF	RUS	Artyom Linchenko
33	MF	RUS	Roman Yemelyanov (end of loan from (Ukraine) Shakhtar Donetsk)
34	DF	RUS	Timofei Margasov (on loan to Sibir Novosibirsk)
37	MF	RUS	Aleksandr Kogoniya (to Druzhba Maykop)
42	MF	RUS	Artyom Kulishev (to Vityaz Podolsk)
48	MF	RUS	Dmitri Mutyev
49	MF	GEO	Jano Ananidze (end of loan from Spartak Moscow)
64	FW	RUS	Andrei Fandeyev
68	DF	RUS	Andrei Zotov
71	MF	RUS	Maksim Miroshnichenko
73	DF	RUS	Aleksandr Logunov (to Lokomotiv Moscow)
79	MF	RUS	Nikita Mitin (to Spartak Nalchik)
97	MF	RUS	Ivan Baklanov (on loan to Arsenal Tula)
—	DF	RUS	Temur Mustafin (on loan to Avangard Kursk)
—	DF	SVK	Kornel Saláta (to (Slovakia) Slovan Bratislava, previously on loan to Tom Tomsk)
—	MF	RUS	Khoren Bayramyan (on loan to Volgar Astrakhan, previously on loan to Rotor Volgograd)
—	MF	RUS	Sergey Belousov (on loan to Sokol Saratov, previously on loan to Shinnik Yaroslavl)
—	MF	RUS	Igor Kireyev (on loan to Amkar Perm, previously on loan to Spartak Nalchik)
—	MF	RUS	Aleksandr Vasilyev (to Ufa, previously on loan to Sibir Novosibirsk)
—	MF	RUS	Nikita Vasilyev (to Kaluga, previously on loan to Torpedo Moscow)
—	FW	CZE	Jan Holenda (to (Czech Republic) Viktoria Plzeň, previously on loan to Tom Tomsk)

=== Rubin Kazan ===
In: Note: Flags indicate national team as defined under FIFA eligibility rules; some limited exceptions apply. Players may hold more than one non-FIFA nationality.

No.	Pos.	Nation	Player
7	FW	RUS	Igor Portnyagin (end of loan to Tom Tomsk)
8	FW	RUS	Vladimir Dyadyun (from Dynamo Moscow)
10	FW	CRO	Marko Livaja (from (Italy) Atalanta)
12	GK	RUS	Aleksandr Filtsov (from FC Krasnodar)
16	MF	RUS	Ilsur Samigullin (end of loan to Neftekhimik Nizhnekamsk)
20	MF	RUS	Vladimir Sobolev (from Dynamo Moscow)
23	DF	GEO	Mamuka Kobakhidze (from (Georgia (country)) Dila Gori)
27	MF	RUS	Magomed Ozdoev (on loan from Lokomotiv Moscow)
29	MF	RUS	Shota Bibilov (from Volga Nizhny Novgorod)
32	MF	RUS	Stefan Balabanov (from Krasnodar-2)
35	DF	ESP	Iván Marcano (end of loan to (Greece) Olympiacos)
36	GK	IRN	Alireza Haghighi (end of loan to (Portugal) Sporting Covilhã)
40	DF	RUS	Timur Ayupov (from Rubin-2 Kazan)
41	DF	RUS	Sergei Doronin
42	DF	RUS	Denis Kibardin (from Rubin-2 Kazan)
46	MF	RUS	Ruslan Kausarov (from Kuban Krasnodar)
49	DF	RUS	Vitali Ustinov (from Rotor Volgograd)
50	MF	RUS	Ivan Zaytsev (from Rubin-2 Kazan)
52	MF	RUS	Aleksei Kotlyarov
58	FW	RUS	Andrei Vshivtsev (end of loan to Rubin-2 Kazan)
63	MF	RUS	Alisher Dzhalilov (end of loan to Neftekhimik Nizhnekamsk)
64	MF	RUS	Nikita Bocharov (end of loan to Neftekhimik Nizhnekamsk)
66	MF	RUS	Marat Sitdikov
73	FW	RUS	Ranis Khusnutdinov
77	MF	BUL	Blagoy Georgiev (from Amkar Perm)
79	MF	UZB	Bobir Davlatov
81	DF	RUS	Ilnur Safeyev (from Chertanovo academy)
86	FW	RUS	Timur Koblov
87	MF	BRA	Carlos Eduardo (end of loan to (Brazil) Flamengo)
89	GK	RUS	Anatoli Malashenko (from Rubin-2 Kazan)
90	FW	RUS	Ruslan Galiakberov (from Rubin-2 Kazan)
92	MF	RUS	Pavel Shadrin (from Rubin-2 Kazan)
93	MF	RUS	Ildar Bikchantayev (from Volga Ulyanovsk)
94	MF	RUS	Artyom Kuklev
95	MF	RUS	Almaz Askarov (from Rubin-2 Kazan)
98	DF	RUS	Almaz Nasybullin (from Rubin-2 Kazan)
99	FW	RUS	Maksim Kanunnikov (from Amkar Perm)

Out: Note: Flags indicate national team as defined under FIFA eligibility rules; some limited exceptions apply. Players may hold more than one non-FIFA nationality.

No.	Pos.	Nation	Player
7	MF	RUS	Vladislav Kulik (on loan to Kuban Krasnodar)
9	MF	RUS	Pavel Mogilevets (end of loan from Zenit St. Petersburg)
9	FW	RUS	Aleksandr Prudnikov (to Dynamo Moscow)
10	MF	RUS	Dmitri Torbinski (to Rostov)
16	FW	RUS	Georgi Nurov (to Ural Sverdlovsk Oblast)
18	FW	LVA	Artūrs Karašausks (end of loan from (Latvia) Skonto)
20	MF	UZB	Vagiz Galiullin (to Ufa)
21	MF	GHA	Wakaso (on loan to (Scotland) Celtic)
22	DF	FRA	Chris Mavinga (on loan to (France) Stade Reims)
23	MF	FIN	Roman Eremenko (to CSKA Moscow)
24	GK	LTU	Giedrius Arlauskis (to (Romania) Steaua București)
30	MF	RUS	Igor Rogachevskiy
32	MF	RUS	Anatoli Savelyev
35	DF	ESP	Iván Marcano (to (Portugal) Porto)
36	GK	IRN	Alireza Haghighi (on loan to (Portugal) Penafiel)
37	MF	TUR	Gökhan Töre (to (Turkey) Beşiktaş, previously on loan)
38	FW	RUS	German Sergeyev
39	DF	RUS	Yuri Litke (to Syzran-2003 Syzran)
41	FW	RUS	Selim Nurmuradov
42	DF	RUS	Dmitri Boyko
46	MF	RUS	Nozim Babadzhanov (to Lokomotiv Moscow)
47	DF	BLR	Mikhail Babichev
51	MF	RUS	Aslanbek Sikoyev
54	FW	RUS	Vladislav Shpitalny (to Amkar Perm)
65	DF	RUS	Maksim Zhestokov (to Volga Nizhny Novgorod)
71	DF	RUS	Aleksei Pashchenko (to Zhemchuzhina Yalta)
76	DF	RUS	Roman Sharonov
81	FW	RUS	Ruslan Mukhametshin (on loan to Mordovia Saransk)
87	DF	AZE	Ruslan Abishov (on loan to (Azerbaijan) Gabala)
90	MF	FRA	Yann M'Vila (on loan to (Italy) Inter Milan)
98	MF	RUS	Roman Stepin (to Dnepr Smolensk)
—	GK	RUS	Yevgeni Cheremisin (to KAMAZ Naberezhnye Chelny, previously on loan to Neftekhimik Nizhnekamsk)
—	DF	RUS	Iskandar Dzhalilov (to Volga Nizhny Novgorod, previously on loan to (Tajikistan) Istiklol)
—	DF	RUS	Aleksandr Orekhov (to Tom Tomsk)
—	DF	RUS	Anton Piskunov (to Dynamo St. Petersburg, previously on loan to Neftekhimik Nizhnekamsk)
—	DF	RUS	Ivan Temnikov (to Tom Tomsk, previously on loan to Terek Grozny)
—	MF	RUS	Alan Kasaev (to Lokomotiv Moscow, previously on loan to Dynamo Moscow)
—	MF	MDA	Mihail Plătică (not registered with the league, previously on loan to Neftekhimik Nizhnekamsk)
—	MF	TJK	Parvizdzhon Umarbaev (to Khimik Dzerzinshk, previously on loan to Neftekhimik Nizhnekamsk)
—	FW	ECU	Walter Chalá (released, previously on loan to Neftekhimik Nizhnekamsk)
—	FW	RUS	Sergei Davydov (on loan to Torpedo Moscow, previously on loan to (Kazakhstan) Aktobe)
—	FW	RUS	Merabi Uridia (to Volga Nizhny Novgorod, previously on loan to Neftekhimik Nizhnekamsk)

=== Spartak Moscow ===
In: Note: Flags indicate national team as defined under FIFA eligibility rules; some limited exceptions apply. Players may hold more than one non-FIFA nationality.

No.	Pos.	Nation	Player
2	DF	ARG	Juan Manuel Insaurralde (end of loan to (Greece) PAOK)
7	MF	GEO	Jano Ananidze (end of loan to Rostov)
9	MF	RUS	Roman Shirokov (from Zenit St. Petersburg)
13	MF	RUS	Dmitri Kudryashov (from Luch-Energiya Vladivostok)
21	MF	SWE	Kim Källström (end of loan to (England) Arsenal)
22	FW	RUS	Artyom Dzyuba (end of loan to Rostov)
24	MF	NED	Quincy Promes (from (Netherlands) Twente)
25	MF	RUS	Diniyar Bilyaletdinov (end of loan to Anzhi Makhachkala)
28	FW	GHA	Majeed Waris (end of loan to (France) Valenciennes)
36	FW	RUS	Dmitri Malikov (from own academy)
37	MF	RUS	Georgi Melkadze
42	MF	RUS	Yegor Sidoruk
46	DF	RUS	Artyom Mamin
51	MF	RUS	Dmitri Kayumov (end of loan to Amkar Perm)
58	MF	RUS	Daniil Gorovykh
59	MF	RUS	Nazar Gordeochuk
63	MF	RUS	Shamsiddin Shanbiyev
65	DF	RUS	Oleg Krasilnichenko
93	DF	RUS	Artyom Sokol
94	DF	RUS	Andrei Shigorev
97	MF	RUS	Danil Poluboyarinov

Out: Note: Flags indicate national team as defined under FIFA eligibility rules; some limited exceptions apply. Players may hold more than one non-FIFA nationality.

No.	Pos.	Nation	Player
6	MF	BRA	Rafael Carioca (on loan to (Brazil) Atlético Mineiro)
7	MF	RUS	Kirill Kombarov (on loan to Torpedo Moscow)
11	MF	ARM	Aras Özbiliz (not registered with the league)
18	FW	PAR	Lucas Barrios (on loan to (France) Montpellier)
25	MF	RUS	Diniyar Bilyaletdinov (on loan to Torpedo Moscow)
28	FW	GHA	Majeed Waris (to (Turkey) Trabzonspor)
31	GK	UKR	Andriy Dykan (to Krasnodar)
36	MF	RUS	Igor Konovalov (to Kuban Krasnodar)
37	FW	RUS	Vladislav Kormishin
47	MF	RUS	Andrei Svyatov (to Tom Tomsk)
63	GK	RUS	Ilya Sukhoruchenko
65	DF	RUS	Yaroslav Shmygov
66	MF	RUS	Ragim Sadykhov
77	DF	RUS	Soslan Gatagov
85	DF	RUS	Anton Fedotov (to Torpedo Vladimir)
—	DF	ARG	Nicolás Pareja (to (Spain) Sevilla, previously on loan)
—	DF	CZE	Marek Suchý (to (Switzerland) Basel, previously on loan)
—	MF	NED	Demy de Zeeuw (released, previously on loan to (Belgium) Anderlecht)
—	MF	RUS	Aleksandr Zotov (on loan to Arsenal Tula, previously on loan to Shinnik Yaroslavl)
—	FW	BRA	Welliton (to (Turkey) Mersin Idman Yurdu, previously on loan to (Spain) Celta de Vigo)

=== Terek Grozny ===
In: Note: Flags indicate national team as defined under FIFA eligibility rules; some limited exceptions apply. Players may hold more than one non-FIFA nationality.

No.	Pos.	Nation	Player
28	MF	RUS	Magomed-Emi Shapiyev (from Terek-2 Grozny)
35	GK	RUS	Ibragim-Sayfullakh Gaziyev
38	MF	RUS	Ibragim Titayev
39	MF	RUS	Muslim Ismailov
41	MF	RUS	Islam Yakhyayev
42	MF	RUS	Aslan Tokhosashvili (from Terek-2 Grozny)
45	DF	RUS	Khalid Shakhtiyev
47	MF	RUS	Yunus Shaipov
49	MF	RUS	Khalid Ismailov
52	MF	RUS	Ismail Matayev
56	FW	RUS	Islam Magamadov
57	MF	RUS	Deni Daliyev
58	DF	RUS	Arsen Vagidov (from Dagdizel Kaspiysk)
62	DF	RUS	Idris Musluyev
66	MF	RUS	Beslan Adamov
71	MF	RUS	Daud Daliyev
73	MF	RUS	Ruslani Mutoshvili (from Terek-2 Grozny)
74	MF	RUS	Arbi Davletgereyev
77	FW	RUS	Ali Kadyrov (from Terek-2 Grozny)
78	MF	RUS	Aslan Yanarsayev (from Terek-2 Grozny)
79	FW	RUS	Umar Asakov
81	GK	RUS	Magomed Mayrbekov
83	DF	RUS	Alibeg Gerayev (from Dagdizel Kaspiysk)
84	DF	RUS	Turpal-Ali Malsagov
85	MF	RUS	Ali Idrisov (from Terek-2 Grozny)
87	DF	RUS	Islam Akayev
88	MF	RUS	Tamerlan Saidkhadzhiyev
89	MF	RUS	Muslim Batayev
96	DF	RUS	Akhmed Abubakarov (from Terek-2 Grozny)
98	MF	RUS	Muslim Askhabov
99	FW	RUS	Movsar Askhabov

Out: Note: Flags indicate national team as defined under FIFA eligibility rules; some limited exceptions apply. Players may hold more than one non-FIFA nationality.

No.	Pos.	Nation	Player
17	DF	RUS	Ivan Temnikov (end of loan from Rubin Kazan)
37	MF	GHA	Mohammed Fuseini
45	DF	RUS	Andrei Ganyushkin (to Chertanovo Moscow)
50	MF	RUS	Shamil Ashakhanov
51	GK	RUS	Yevgeni Kobozev (on loan to Krylia Sovetov Samara)
62	MF	RUS	Mansur Batyrov
64	MF	RUS	Zelim Taymyskhanov
70	MF	RUS	Bekkhan Usmanov (to Zhemchuzhina Yalta)
75	DF	RUS	Dmitri Yashin (on loan to Sokol Saratov)
83	MF	RUS	Aleksandr Semyachkin (to Syzran-2003 Syzran)
84	MF	RUS	Artyom Bragin (to Saturn Ramenskoye)
90	DF	RUS	Murad Tagilov (on loan to Khimik Dzerzhinsk)
96	FW	RUS	Magomed Mitrishev (on loan to Anzhi Makhachkala)
—	MF	RUS	Adlan Katsayev (on loan to (Poland) Lechia Gdańsk, previously on loan to Luch-Energiya Vladivostok)
—	MF	POL	Maciej Makuszewski (to (Poland) Lechia Gdańsk, previously on loan)

=== Torpedo Moscow ===
In: Note: Flags indicate national team as defined under FIFA eligibility rules; some limited exceptions apply. Players may hold more than one non-FIFA nationality.

No.	Pos.	Nation	Player
3	DF	POL	Adam Kokoszka (from (Poland) Śląsk Wrocław)
7	MF	RUS	Semyon Fomin (from Rotor Volgograd)
8	MF	AUS	Ivan Franjic (from (Australia) Brisbane Roar)
9	MF	RUS	Kirill Kombarov (on loan from Spartak Moscow)
10	FW	RUS	Sergei Davydov (on loan from Rubin Kazan)
13	GK	CRO	Goran Blažević (from (Bulgaria) Levski Sofia)
14	MF	BLR	Anton Putsila (from Volga Nizhny Novgorod)
16	MF	SVN	Dalibor Stevanović (from (Poland) Śląsk Wrocław)
18	FW	RUS	Aleksei Pugin (from Rotor Volgograd)
21	MF	RUS	Denis Voynov (end of loan to Fakel Voronezh)
23	MF	RUS	Diniyar Bilyaletdinov (on loan from Spartak Moscow)
26	MF	POR	Márcio Abreu (from Krasnodar)
27	FW	POR	Hugo Vieira (from (Portugal) Braga)
30	GK	BLR	Yuri Zhevnov
31	MF	RUS	Dmitri Litvinov (from CSKA Moscow)
33	DF	RUS	Vladimir Rykov (from Dynamo Moscow)
46	MF	RUS	Vyacheslav Kalinkin (from Kuban Krasnodar)
48	FW	RUS	Nikita Melnikov
50	FW	RUS	Akhmed Pugiyev
51	DF	RUS	Nikita Romaschenko
52	GK	RUS	Yuri Shafinskiy (from Lokomotiv-2 Moscow)
60	DF	RUS	Andrei Nikonov (from Lokomotiv-2 Moscow)
62	MF	RUS	Gadzhi Adzhiyev (from (Lithuania) Klaipėdos Granitas)
67	DF	RUS	Konstantin Yurchik
69	MF	RUS	Vladislav Semyonov (from Lokomotiv Moscow)
71	DF	RUS	Georgi Tigiyev (from Kuban Krasnodar)
74	MF	RUS	Konstantin Kertanov (from Kuban Krasnodar)
78	MF	RUS	Nikita Kirsanov (from Khimki-M)
87	MF	RUS	Mikhail Pogonin (from Lokomotiv Moscow)
89	GK	RUS	Nikita Ignatov
93	MF	RUS	Mekhman Bekhbudov
95	DF	RUS	Oleg Murachyov

Out: Note: Flags indicate national team as defined under FIFA eligibility rules; some limited exceptions apply. Players may hold more than one non-FIFA nationality.

No.	Pos.	Nation	Player
2	DF	SVK	Lukáš Tesák (to Arsenal Tula)
4	DF	RUS	Dmitry Aydov (to Anzhi Makhachkala)
7	MF	RUS	Denis Boyarintsev (retired)
8	MF	RUS	Denis Bolshakov (to Domodedovo Moscow)
9	MF	LVA	Edgars Gauračs (to (Latvia) Spartaks Jūrmala)
14	GK	RUS	Yevgeni Konyukhov (to Krylia Sovetov Samara)
18	MF	CRO	Matija Dvorneković (end of loan from Volga Nizhny Novgorod)
26	MF	POR	Márcio Abreu (retired)
38	MF	RUS	Maksim Burchenko (to Luch-Energiya Vladivostok)
44	MF	RUS	Lev Kornilov (to Saturn Ramenskoye)
50	MF	RUS	Viktor Svezhov (end of loan from Krylia Sovetov Samara)
55	GK	LTU	Saulius Klevinskas (not registered with the league)
70	MF	RUS	Nikita Vasilyev (end of loan from Rostov)
84	MF	RUS	Oleg Vlasov (to Mordovia Saransk)
87	MF	UKR	Denys Skepskyi (to Sakhalin Yuzhno-Sakhalinsk)
—	GK	RUS	Andrei Lunev (not registered with the league, previously on loan to Kaluga)
—	DF	RUS	Sergei Yefimov (on loan to TSK Simferopol, previously on loan to Zenit Penza)
—	MF	RUS	Oleg Polyakov (to Zenit-Izhevsk Izhevsk, previously on loan to Tyumen)

=== Ufa ===
In: Note: Flags indicate national team as defined under FIFA eligibility rules; some limited exceptions apply. Players may hold more than one non-FIFA nationality.

No.	Pos.	Nation	Player
5	MF	GHA	Emmanuel Frimpong (from (England) Barnsley)
7	MF	RUS	Nikita Bezlikhotnov (from Kuban Krasnodar)
9	FW	BIH	Haris Handžić (from (Bosnia and Herzegovina) Borac Banja Luka)
10	MF	BRA	Marcinho (from (Bulgaria) CSKA Sofia)
16	GK	BLR	Syarhey Vyeramko (from Krylia Sovetov Samara)
19	MF	CRO	Ivan Paurević (from (Germany) Fortuna Düsseldorf)
20	MF	RUS	Denis Tumasyan (on loan from Ural Sverdlovsk Oblast)
22	MF	UZB	Vagiz Galiullin (from Rubin Kazan)
27	MF	JPN	Takafumi Akahoshi (from (Poland) Pogoń Szczecin)
28	DF	GER	Felicio Brown Forbes (from Krylia Sovetov Samara)
30	GK	RUS	Viktor Yanbarisov
40	MF	RUS	Ilya Sevastyanov
44	MF	RUS	Timur Gogolidze
47	DF	RUS	Vladislav Filippov
48	DF	RUS	Vyacheslav Morozov
49	MF	RUS	Aleksandr Vasilyev (from Rostov)
50	MF	RUS	Sergei Tamrazov
51	GK	RUS	Artur Rozyyev
52	GK	RUS	Ruslan Agayev
55	DF	RUS	Stanislav Bugayev
60	FW	RUS	Vladlen Khalfin
75	FW	RUS	Almaz Salmanov
78	FW	RUS	Aleksandr Ponomaryov
79	DF	RUS	Oleg Kupryakov
80	MF	RUS	Denis Gilmanov
81	DF	BLR	Dmitry Verkhovtsov (from Krylia Sovetov Samara)
85	DF	RUS	Erik Salikhov
89	MF	RUS	Kirill Panchikhin
90	DF	RUS	Artur Shaybekov
91	MF	RUS	Rudolf Gabidullin
92	MF	RUS	Marat Atlukhanov
93	MF	RUS	Ruslan Akbashev (from Energiya Volzhsky)
94	DF	RUS	Eduard Shaykhutdinov
95	MF	RUS	Sergei Krechetov
96	FW	RUS	Arsen Benifand
97	FW	RUS	Danil Shakirov
98	FW	RUS	Ilmir Yakupov

Out: Note: Flags indicate national team as defined under FIFA eligibility rules; some limited exceptions apply. Players may hold more than one non-FIFA nationality.

No.	Pos.	Nation	Player
2	DF	RUS	Tagir Akhmetshin
5	DF	KGZ	Valerii Kichin (end of loan from Volga Nizhny Novgorod)
7	MF	RUS	Nikolai Zhilyayev (to Fakel Voronezh)
10	MF	RUS	Artur Valikayev (to Tom Tomsk)
12	FW	RUS	Anton Zabolotny (to Fakel Voronezh)
16	GK	RUS	Mikhail Baranovskiy (to Kaluga)
17	DF	RUS	Aleksandr Vasilenko (to Fakel Voronezh)
19	DF	RUS	Yevgeni Osipov (to Arsenal Tula)
21	MF	RUS	Seyt-Daut Garakoyev (to Luch-Energiya Vladivostok)
22	GK	RUS	Dmitry Izotov
30	MF	RUS	Ivan Nagibin (to Sibir Novosibirsk)
36	DF	RUS	Dmitri Grachyov (to Luch-Energiya Vladivostok)
88	DF	RUS	Andrei Kireyev (to Fakel Voronezh)
—	FW	RUS	Vitali Galysh (to Yenisey Krasnoyarsk, previously on loan)
—	FW	RUS	Andrei Myazin (to Luch-Energiya Vladivostok, previously on loan to Rotor Volgograd)

=== Ural Sverdlovsk Oblast ===
In: Note: Flags indicate national team as defined under FIFA eligibility rules; some limited exceptions apply. Players may hold more than one non-FIFA nationality.

No.	Pos.	Nation	Player
4	DF	AUT	Markus Berger (from (Norway) Start)
5	MF	RUS	Roman Yemelyanov (on loan from (Ukraine) Shakhtar Donetsk)
8	MF	RUS	Ivan Chudin (end of loan to Volga Ulyanovsk)
14	MF	RUS	Vyacheslav Podberyozkin (from Lokomotiv Moscow)
15	MF	RUS	Arsen Oganesyan (from Kaluga)
18	FW	RUS	Georgi Nurov (from Rubin Kazan)
20	MF	RUS	Igor Lambarschi (from Krasnodar)
22	GK	RUS	Aleksandr Shubin
29	DF	ARG	Pablo Fontanello (from (Norway) Stabæk)
38	MF	RUS	Nikita Mamonov
41	MF	RUS	Aleksandr Sapeta (from Dynamo Moscow, previously on loan)
43	MF	RUS	Pavel Repin
45	FW	RUS	Aleksandr Sobolev (end of loan to Kaluga)
55	MF	RUS	Anatoli Sedov
69	DF	RUS	Aleksei Nelyubin
80	MF	RUS	Yegor Zlygostev
81	FW	RUS	Semyon Voronov
82	MF	RUS	Vladimir Lisov
84	DF	RUS	Yevgeni Ivanov
85	MF	RUS	Sergei Serchenkov (from Lokomotiv Moscow)
89	MF	RUS	Aleksandr Yerokhin (from SKA-Energiya Khabarovsk, previously on loan)
90	FW	RUS	Fyodor Smolov (on loan from Dynamo Moscow)
93	MF	RUS	Semyon Pomogayev (end of loan to Dynamo St. Petersburg)
95	FW	RUS	Aleksandr Babushkin
99	MF	UKR	Kostyantyn Yaroshenko (from (Ukraine) Sevastopol)

Out: Note: Flags indicate national team as defined under FIFA eligibility rules; some limited exceptions apply. Players may hold more than one non-FIFA nationality.

No.	Pos.	Nation	Player
13	MF	RUS	Denis Tumasyan (on loan to Ufa)
15	MF	RUS	Andrei Bochkov (on loan to Tosno)
17	MF	RUS	Andrei Gorbanets (not registered with the league)
20	MF	BLR	Andrey Chukhley (to Tyumen)
27	FW	RUS	Aleksandr Sobolev (on loan to Kaluga)
30	MF	GEO	Lasha Gvalia (to (Georgia (country)) Zestafoni)
65	DF	RUS	Alan Bagayev (to Alania Vladikavkaz)
77	MF	RUS	Kantemir Berkhamov (to Tosno)
78	MF	HUN	Vladimir Koman (end of loan from Krasnodar)
84	DF	RUS	Roman Nabiullin
88	DF	RUS	Aleksei Gerasimov (on loan to SKA-Energiya Khabarovsk)
90	MF	RUS	Nikita Ivanov (to Belogorsk)
99	MF	RUS	Maksim Sergeyev (to Nosta Novotroitsk)
—	MF	RUS	Ivan Melnik (on loan to Khimik Dzerzhinsk, previously on loan to Dynamo St. Petersburg)

=== Zenit Saint Petersburg ===
In: Note: Flags indicate national team as defined under FIFA eligibility rules; some limited exceptions apply. Players may hold more than one non-FIFA nationality.

No.	Pos.	Nation	Player
8	MF	RUS	Pavel Mogilevets (end of loan to Rubin Kazan)
21	MF	ESP	Javi García (from (England) Manchester City)
24	DF	ARG	Ezequiel Garay (from (Portugal) Benfica)
33	DF	SRB	Milan Rodić (end of loan to Volga Nizhny Novgorod)
34	FW	RUS	Maximilian Pronichev (from (Germany) Hertha BSC)
39	DF	RUS	Dmitri Skopintsev (from Dynamo Moscow)
45	DF	RUS	Artyom Vodyannikov
49	DF	RUS	Denis Terentyev (end of loan to Tom Tomsk)
57	DF	RUS	Dzhamaldin Khodzhaniyazov (end of loan to Amkar Perm)
63	DF	RUS	Daniil Maykov
67	MF	RUS	Nikita Andreyev
77	FW	MNE	Luka Đorđević (end of loan to (Netherlands) Twente)
81	GK	RUS	Andrei Strozhevskiy
98	FW	RUS	Yevgeni Kozlov (from Volga Nizhny Novgorod)
99	MF	RUS	Ivan Solovyov (end of loan to Amkar Perm)

Out: Note: Flags indicate national team as defined under FIFA eligibility rules; some limited exceptions apply. Players may hold more than one non-FIFA nationality.

No.	Pos.	Nation	Player
3	DF	ARG	Cristian Ansaldi (on loan to (Spain) Atlético Madrid)
14	DF	SVK	Tomáš Hubočan (to Dynamo Moscow)
18	MF	RUS	Konstantin Zyryanov (to Zenit-2 St. Petersburg)
24	DF	SRB	Aleksandar Luković
45	DF	RUS	Maksim Petrov
63	FW	RUS	Anton Solovyov
67	DF	RUS	Dmitri Chertishchev
69	MF	RUS	Sergei Filatenko
77	FW	MNE	Luka Đorđević (on loan to (Italy) Sampdoria)
81	MF	RUS	Maksim Batov
84	DF	RUS	Mikhail Kovalenko
86	DF	RUS	Yevgeni Alfyorov (on loan to Arsenal Tula)
87	MF	RUS	Aleksei Kayukov (on loan to Tom-2 Tomsk)
89	FW	RUS	Yevgeni Markov (on loan to Yenisey Krasnoyarsk)
93	FW	RUS	Aleksei Panfilov
98	FW	RUS	Vladislav Yefimov (to Dynamo Barnaul)
—	MF	RUS	Roman Shirokov (to Spartak Moscow, previously on loan to Krasnodar)
—	MF	RUS	Vladimir Bystrov (to Krasnodar, previously on loan to Anzhi Makhachkala)
—	FW	RUS	Aleksandr Bukharov (to Rostov, previously on loan to Anzhi Makhachkala)
—	FW	USA	Eugene Starikov (released, previously on loan to Tom Tomsk)
