= Fyodor Shcherbachenko =

Russian footballer, coach, and referee

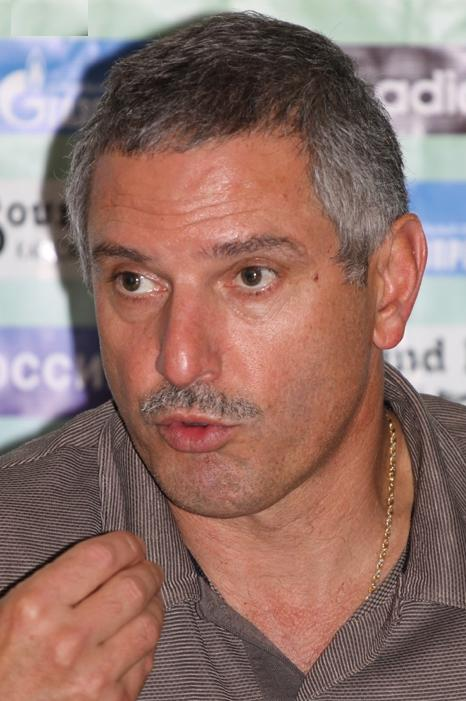

Personal information
- Full name: Fyodor Anatolyevich Shcherbachenko
- Date of birth: 13 August 1962 (age 64)
- Place of birth: Slavyansk-na-Kubani, Russian SFSR
- Position: Forward

Team information
- Current team: Ufa (assistant coach)

Senior career*
Years	Team	Apps	(Gls)
1980	Kuban Krasnodar	0	(0)
1981	Tsement Novorossiysk	19	(2)
1985–1986	Golubaya Niva Slavyansk-na-Kubani (amateur)		
1991	Kolos Krasnodar (amateur)		
1995	Monolit Novotitarovskaya		
1995	GNS-Spartak Krasnodar		

Managerial career
- 1999–2000: Kuban Krasnodar (director)
- 2000: Kuban Krasnodar (VP)
- 2000: Kuban Krasnodar
- 2001: Kuban Krasnodar (general director)
- 2002: Kuban Krasnodar (director)
- 2003: Tom Tomsk (analyst)
- 2004–2005: Moscow (assistant)
- 2006: Krasnodar-2000 (assistant)
- 2007: Kuban Krasnodar (analyst)
- 2007: Kuban Krasnodar (reserves)
- 2007: Rostov (assistant)
- 2007–2008: Baltika Kaliningrad (caretaker)
- 2008: Gubkin
- 2009–2012: Mordovia Saransk
- 2013–2014: Rotor Volgograd
- 2015: Ulisses
- 2015: Kaisar
- 2021: Minsk
- 2022: Rotor Volgograd (sporting director)
- 2024–2025: Akhmat Grozny (assistant)
- 2025: Akhmat Grozny (caretaker)
- 2025: Ural Yekaterinburg (assistant)
- 2026–: Ufa (assistant)
- * Club domestic league appearances and goals

Fyodor Anatolyevich Shcherbachenko (Russian: Фёдор Анатольевич Щербаченко; born 13 August 1962) is a Russian professional football coach and a former player and referee. He is an assistant coach with Ufa.

== Career ==
=== Playing ===
As a player, he made his debut in the Soviet Second League in 1981 for Tsement Novorossiysk.

=== Referee ===
From 1995 to 1998, he worked as a referee, mostly in the Russian Second Division and lower levels.

=== Managerial ===
Following Dmitriy Ogai resignation in July 2015, Shcherbachenko was appointed as manager of Kaisar on 6 August 2015. Shcherbachenko left the club on 10 November following the completion of the 2015 season during which Kaisar were relegated.

On 28 May 2025, Shcherbachenko was appointed caretaker manager of Akhmat Grozny after the team lost the first leg of the 2024–25 Russian Premier League relegation play-offs and Sergei Tashuyev resigned. Akhmat won the second leg (and on aggregate) and remained in the Premier League.

== Honours ==
- Russian Second Division, Zone Ural-Povolzhye best manager: 2009.
- Football Championship of the National League winner: 2011/12
