= Vladimir Rykov =

Russian footballer

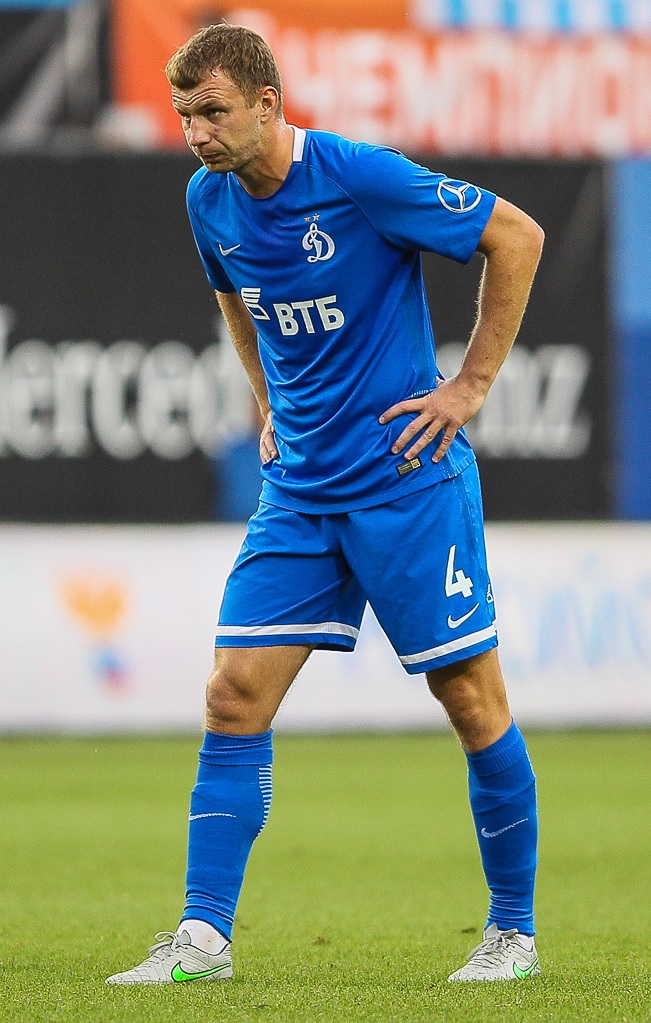
- Rykov with Dynamo in 2016

Personal information
- Full name: Vladimir Vladimirovich Rykov
- Date of birth: 13 November 1987 (age 38)
- Place of birth: Novosibirsk, Russian SFSR
- Height: 1.94 m (6 ft 4 in)
- Position: Defender

Team information
- Current team: FC Pari Nizhny Novgorod (deputy sporting director)

Senior career*
Years	Team	Apps	(Gls)
2005–2006	FC Chkalovets Novosibirsk	43	(5)
2007	FC SKA-Energiya Khabarovsk	0	(0)
2007	FC Smena Komsomolsk-na-Amure	22	(1)
2008	FC Gazovik Orenburg	21	(1)
2009	FC Saturn-2 Moscow Oblast	11	(1)
2009	FC KAMAZ Naberezhnye Chelny	11	(0)
2010	FC Volga Nizhny Novgorod	3	(0)
2010–2011	FC KAMAZ Naberezhnye Chelny	38	(3)
2011–2014	FC Dynamo Moscow	18	(1)
2013–2014	→ FC Tom Tomsk (loan)	27	(2)
2014–2015	FC Torpedo Moscow	28	(2)
2015–2016	FC Mordovia Saransk	27	(2)
2016–2020	FC Dynamo Moscow	72	(3)
2020–2021	FC Ural Yekaterinburg	25	(0)
2022–2023	FC Rodina Moscow	17	(0)

International career
2012	Russia-2	1	(1)

Managerial career
- 2023–2024: FC Dynamo-2 Moscow (assistant)
- 2024–: FC Pari Nizhny Novgorod (deputy sporting director)
- * Club domestic league appearances and goals

Vladimir Vladimirovich Rykov (Russian: Владимир Владимирович Рыков; born 13 November 1987) is a Russian professional football coach and a former player who played as centre-back. He is deputy sporting director with FC Pari Nizhny Novgorod.

== Club career ==
=== Career statistics ===
As of 11 December 2021

Club	Season	League			Cup		Continental		Other		Total	
Club	Season	Division	Apps	Goals	Apps	Goals	Apps	Goals	Apps	Goals	Apps	Goals
Chkalovets Novosibirsk	2005	PFL	15	2	–		–		–		15	2
Chkalovets Novosibirsk	2006	PFL	28	3	–		–		–		28	3
Chkalovets Novosibirsk	Total		43	5	0	0	0	0	0	0	43	5
Smena Komsomolsk-na-Amure	2007	PFL	22	1	4	2	–		–		26	3
Gazovik Orenburg	2008	PFL	21	1	4	1	–		–		25	2
Saturn-2 Moscow Region	2009	PFL	11	1	2	2	–		–		13	3
KAMAZ Naberezhnye Chelny	2009	FNL	11	0	–		–		–		11	0
Volga Nizhny Novgorod	2010	FNL	3	0	1	0	–		–		4	0
KAMAZ Naberezhnye Chelny	2010	FNL	15	2	–		–		–		15	2
KAMAZ Naberezhnye Chelny	2011–12	FNL	23	1	1	0	–		–		24	1
KAMAZ Naberezhnye Chelny	Total (2 spells)		49	3	1	0	0	0	0	0	50	3
Dynamo Moscow	2011–12	RPL	11	1	2	0	–		–		13	1
Dynamo Moscow	2012–13	RPL	7	0	1	2	2 (Note: Appearances in the UEFA Europa League)	0	–		10	2
Tom Tomsk	2013–14	RPL	27	2	1	0	–		2 (Note: Appearances in the relegation play-offs)	0	30	2
Torpedo Moscow	2014–15	RPL	28	2	2	0	–		–		30	2
Mordovia Saransk	2015–16	RPL	27	2	0	0	–		–		27	2
Dynamo Moscow	2016–17	FNL	23	1	3	1	–		–		26	2
Dynamo Moscow	2017–18	RPL	16	1	0	0	–		–		16	1
Dynamo Moscow	2018–19	RPL	14	1	1	0	–		–		15	1
Dynamo Moscow	2019–20	RPL	19	0	1	0	–		–		20	0
Dynamo Moscow	Total (2 spells)		90	4	8	3	2	0	0	0	100	7
Ural Yekaterinburg	2020–21	RPL	21	0	1	0	–		–		22	0
Ural Yekaterinburg	2021–22	RPL	4	0	1	0	–		–		5	0
Ural Yekaterinburg	Total		25	0	2	0	0	0	0	0	27	0
Career total			303	16	25	8	2	0	2	0	332	24
