= Aleksandr Strokov =

Russian footballer

Personal information
- Full name: Aleksandr Valeryevich Strokov
- Date of birth: 31 January 1991 (age 35)
- Height: 1.80 m (5 ft 11 in)
- Position: Defender

Senior career*
Years	Team	Apps	(Gls)
2008–2009	FC Mordovia-2 Saransk		
2010	FC Khimmash Ruzayevka		
2011–2012	FC Tsementnik-Mordovia-D Komsomolsky		
2012–2015	FC Mordovia Saransk	5	(0)
2014	→ FC Tambov (loan)	12	(1)
2015	FC Ruzayevka-Avtomobilist Ruzayevka		
2016	FC Playterra Zubova Polyana		
- * Club domestic league appearances and goals

Aleksandr Valeryevich Strokov (Russian: Александр Валерьевич Строков; born 31 January 1991) is a former Russian football defender.

== Club career ==
He made his debut in the Russian Football National League for FC Mordovia Saransk on 23 October 2013 in a game against FC Dynamo Saint Petersburg.
