= Ruslan Navlyotov =

Russian footballer

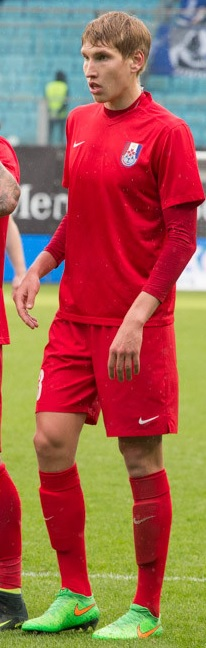
- Navlyotov with Mordovia in 2017

Personal information
- Full name: Ruslan Radikovich Navlyotov
- Date of birth: 10 December 1993 (age 32)
- Place of birth: Saransk, Russia
- Height: 1.91 m (6 ft 3 in)
- Position: Defender

Youth career
- FC Mordovia Saransk

Senior career*
Years	Team	Apps	(Gls)
2012–2014	FC MGPI-Mordovia Saransk		
2014–2020	FC Mordovia Saransk	57	(1)
2020	FC Tyumen	10	(0)
2021	FC Volga Ulyanovsk	6	(0)
2021–2022	FC Dynamo Saint Petersburg	24	(0)
- * Club domestic league appearances and goals

Ruslan Radikovich Navlyotov (Russian: Руслан Радикович Навлётов; born 10 December 1993) is a Russian former football player.

== Club career ==
He made his debut in the Russian Premier League for FC Mordovia Saransk on 13 March 2016 in a game against FC Krasnodar.
