= Nukri Revishvili =

Georgian footballer

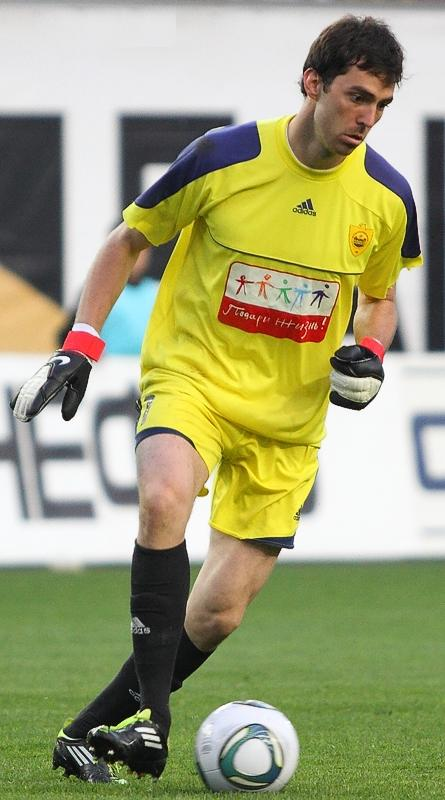
- With Anzhi Makhachkala in 2011

Personal information
- Date of birth: 2 March 1987 (age 39)
- Place of birth: Kutaisi, Georgia
- Height: 1.88 m (6 ft 2 in)
- Position: Goalkeeper

Youth career
- Torpedo Kutaisi

Senior career*
| Years | Team | Apps | (Gls) |
| 2004–2005 | Torpedo Kutaisi | 14 | (0) |
| 2006–2009 | Rubin Kazan | 7 | (0) |
| 2010–2011 | Anzhi Makhachkala | 40 | (0) |
| 2012–2013 | Krasnodar | 15 | (0) |
| 2013–2014 | Dila Gori | 16 | (0) |
| 2014 | Valletta | 11 | (0) |
| 2014–2015 | FC Tosno | 21 | (0) |
| 2015–2016 | Mordovia Saransk | 22 | (0) |
| 2016–2017 | Dinamo Tbilisi | 7 | (0) |
| 2017 | Dacia Chișinău | 0 | (0) |
| 2017 | Dinamo Tbilisi | 10 | (0) |
| 2018 | Rustavi | 16 | (1) |

International career
| 2003 | Georgia U17 | 1 | (0) |
| 2004–2005 | Georgia U19 | 6 | (0) |
| 2006–2008 | Georgia U21 | 7 | (0) |
| 2005–2017 | Georgia | 32 | (0) |
- * Club domestic league appearances and goals

Nukri Revishvili (Georgian: ნუკრი რევიშვილი, romanized: nuk'ri revishvili, pronounced [nukʼɾi ɾeviʃʷili]; born 2 March 1987) is a Georgian former footballer.

Revishvili made his international debut on 2 successive games in 2006 FIFA World Cup qualification (UEFA).

After the qualifying, he also played two friendlies in 2005, two in 2006 and one friendly in 2007.

== Club statistics ==
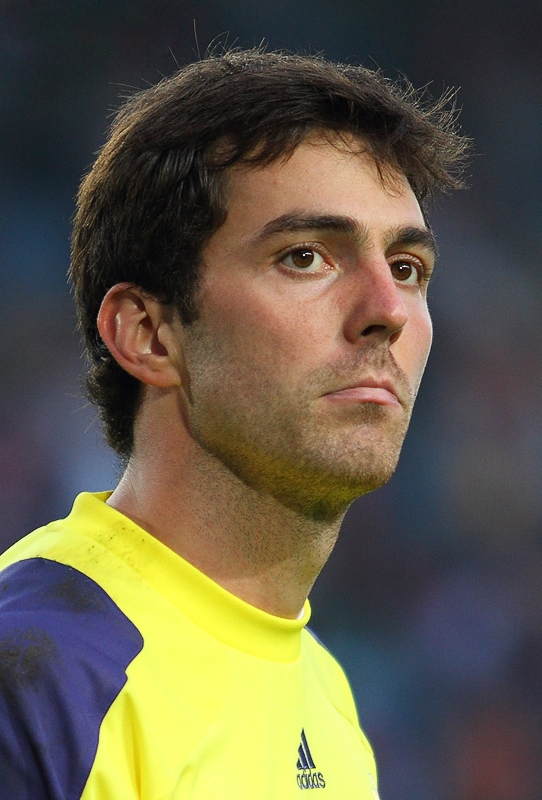

As of 11 August 2013

| Club | Season | League | | Cup | | Europe | | Total | |
| Club | Season | Apps | Goals | Apps | Goals | Apps | Goals | Apps | Goals |
|---|---|---|---|---|---|---|---|---|---|
| Torpedo Kutaisi | 2004–05 | 2 | 0 | 0 | 0 | 0 | 0 | 2 | 0 |
| Torpedo Kutaisi | 2005–06 | 11 | 0 | 0 | 0 | 2 | 0 | 13 | 0 |
| Torpedo Kutaisi | Total | 13 | 0 | 0 | 0 | 2 | 0 | 15 | 0 |
| Rubin Kazan | 2006 | 4 | 0 | 1 | 0 | 1 | 0 | 6 | 0 |
| Rubin Kazan | 2007 | 2 | 0 | 0 | 0 | 0 | 0 | 2 | 0 |
| Rubin Kazan | 2008 | 0 | 0 | 0 | 0 | 0 | 0 | 0 | 0 |
| Rubin Kazan | 2009 | 1 | 0 | 0 | 0 | 0 | 0 | 1 | 0 |
| Rubin Kazan | Total | 7 | 0 | 1 | 0 | 1 | 0 | 9 | 0 |
| Anzhi Makhachkala | 2010 | 14 | 0 | 0 | 0 | 0 | 0 | 14 | 0 |
| Anzhi Makhachkala | 2011–12 | 26 | 0 | 3 | 0 | 0 | 0 | 29 | 0 |
| Anzhi Makhachkala | Total | 40 | 0 | 3 | 0 | 0 | 0 | 43 | 0 |
| FC Krasnodar | 2012–13 | 15 | 0 | 0 | 0 | 0 | 0 | 15 | 0 |
| FC Krasnodar | Total | 15 | 0 | 0 | 0 | 0 | 0 | 15 | 0 |
| Career totals | | 61 | 0 | 4 | 0 | 3 | 0 | 82 | 0 |
