= Pavel Ignatovich =

Russian footballer

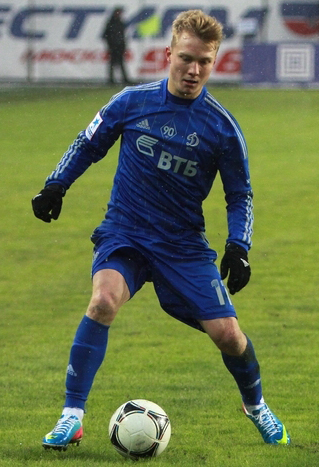
- Ignatovich with Dynamo Moscow in 2013

Personal information
- Full name: Pavel Gennadyevich Ignatovich
- Date of birth: 24 May 1989 (age 37)
- Place of birth: Leningrad, Soviet Union
- Height: 1.78 m (5 ft 10 in)
- Positions: Midfielder; forward

Senior career*
Years	Team	Apps	(Gls)
2007–2010	Zenit St. Petersburg	0	(0)
2010	→ Khimki (loan)	18	(5)
2011–2012	Dynamo Bryansk	7	(1)
2012	Amkar Perm	14	(3)
2013–2014	Dynamo Moscow	7	(0)
2013–2014	→ Tom Tomsk (loan)	25	(1)
2014–2017	Mordovia Saransk	52	(3)
2017	Ermis Aradippou	1	(0)
2017–2018	Tambov	14	(4)
2018–2020	Nizhny Novgorod	59	(10)
2020–2021	Shinnik Yaroslavl	18	(1)

International career
2009	Russia U-20	3	(3)
2010	Russia U-21	1	(0)
- * Club domestic league appearances and goals

Pavel Gennadyevich Ignatovich (Russian: Па́вел Генна́дьевич Игнато́вич; born 24 May 1989) is a Russian former football player.

== Career ==
The promising youngster who is known for his pace and dribbling ability, Ignatovich joined Zenit Reserves in 2007 at the age of 17. He made his debut for the first team on 20 August 2009, coming as a substitute in UEFA Europa League game against Portuguese side Nacional de Madeira. He made an instant impact and scored almost immediately, only for the goal to be disallowed for offside.

Despite finishing as Reserves tournament top scorer in 2009, he hadn't been registered for the club in 2010.

In July 2010 he was loaned to D1 club Khimki until the end of the season.

In July 2012 he signed a two-year contract with Amkar Perm. He made his Russian Premier League debut for Amkar on 12 August 2012 in a game against Mordovia Saransk.

== Personal life ==
He is a son of former Zenit Leningrad defender Gennady Ignatovich.

== Career statistics ==
Club	Season	League			Cup		Continental		Other		Total	
Club	Season	Division	Apps	Goals	Apps	Goals	Apps	Goals	Apps	Goals	Apps	Goals
Zenit St. Petersburg	2008	Russian Premier League	0	0	0	0	0	0	–		0	0
Zenit St. Petersburg	2009	Russian Premier League	0	0	0	0	2 (Note: Appearances in the UEFA Europa League)	0	–		2	0
Zenit St. Petersburg	Total		0	0	0	0	2	0	0	0	2	0
Khimki (loan)	2010	Russian First League	18	5	–		–		–		18	5
Dynamo Bryansk	2011–12	Russian First League	7	1	1	0	–		–		8	1
Amkar Perm	2012–13	Russian Premier League	14	3	1	0	–		–		15	3
Dynamo Moscow	2012–13	Russian Premier League	7	0	0	0	–		–		7	0
Dynamo Moscow	2014–15	Russian Premier League	0	0	–		0	0	–		0	0
Dynamo Moscow	Total		7	0	0	0	0	0	0	0	7	0
Tom Tomsk (loan)	2013–14	Russian Premier League	25	1	1	0	–		1 (Note: Appearance in relegation play-offs)	0	27	1
Mordovia Saransk	2014–15	Russian Premier League	5	0	1	0	–		–		6	0
Mordovia Saransk	2015–16	Russian Premier League	18	0	1	0	–		–		19	0
Mordovia Saransk	2016–17	Russian First League	29	3	2	0	–		4 (Note: Appearances in the FNL Cup)	0	35	3
Mordovia Saransk	Total		52	3	4	0	0	0	4	0	60	3
Ermis Aradippou	2017–18	Cypriot First Division	1	0	–		–		–		1	0
Tambov	2017–18	Russian First League	14	4	2	0	–		6 (Note: Two appearances in promotion play-offs, four appearances in the FNL Cup)	0	22	4
Nizhny Novgorod	2018–19	Russian First League	34	5	2	0	–		2 (Note: Appearances in promotion play-offs)	0	38	5
Nizhny Novgorod	2019–20	Russian First League	25	5	3	1	–		–		28	6
Nizhny Novgorod	2020–21	Russian First League	0	0	0	0	–		–		0	0
Nizhny Novgorod	Total		59	10	5	1	0	0	2	0	66	11
Shinnik Yaroslavl	2020–21	Russian First League	18	1	0	0	–		–		18	1
Career total			215	28	14	1	2	0	13	0	244	29
