= Dmitri Tsitsilin =

Russian footballer

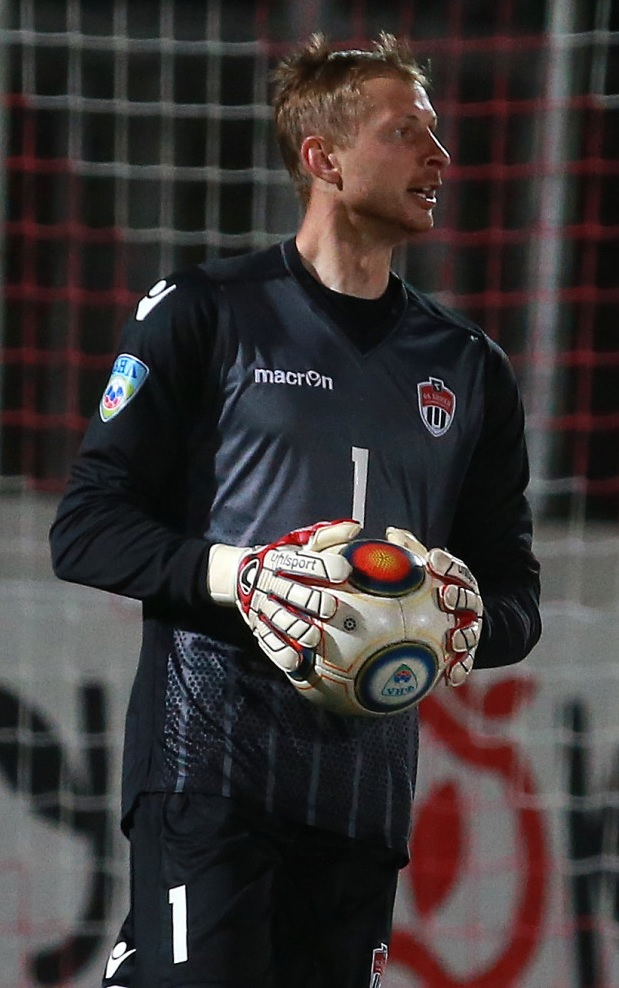
- Tsitsilin with Khimki in 2016

Personal information
- Full name: Dmitri Aleksandrovich Tsitsilin
- Date of birth: 24 October 1985 (age 41)
- Place of birth: Voronezh, Russian SFSR
- Height: 1.89 m (6 ft 2 in)
- Position: Goalkeeper

Team information
- Current team: Academy FC Fakel Voronezh (GK coach)

Youth career
- 1997–2000: FC Fakel Voronezh
- 2000–2003: FC Rotor Volgograd

Senior career*
Years	Team	Apps	(Gls)
2004–2006	FC Rotor Volgograd	5	(0)
2004–2006	→ FC Rotor-2 Volgograd	5	(0)
2005	→ FC Tekstilshchik Kamyshin (loan)	2	(0)
2006	FC Metallurg Krasnoyarsk	2	(0)
2007	FC Fakel Voronezh (amateur)		
2007–2008	FC Gubkin	16	(0)
2009–2010	FC Fakel Voronezh	30	(0)
2011–2012	FC Salyut Belgorod	20	(0)
2012–2013	FC Metallurg-Kuzbass Novokuznetsk	0	(0)
2013–2014	FC Khimki	15	(0)
2014	FC Vybor-Kurbatovo Voronezh	10	(0)
2015–2017	FC Khimki	37	(0)
2017–2018	FC Chayka Peschanokopskoye	28	(0)
2018–2019	FC Torpedo Moscow	16	(0)
Total		186	(0)

Managerial career
- 2020–2021: FC Fakel-M Voronezh (GK coach)
- 2021–: Academy FC Fakel Voronezh (GK coach)
- * Club domestic league appearances and goals

Dmitri Aleksandrovich Tsitsilin (Russian: Дмитрий Александрович Цицилин; born 24 October 1985) is a Russian professional football coach and a former player. He is the goalkeeping coach with FC Fakel-M Voronezh.

== Club career ==
He made his Russian Football National League debut for FC Metallurg Krasnoyarsk on 16 September 2006 in a game against FC Oryol.
