= David Ozmanov =

Russian footballer

Personal information
- Full name: David Tengizovich Ozmanov
- Date of birth: 31 January 1995 (age 31)
- Place of birth: Saratov, Russia
- Height: 1.83 m (6 ft 0 in)
- Position: Defender

Team information
- Current team: Ufa
- Number: 17

Youth career
- Sokol Saratov
- 2014–2015: Mordovia Saransk

Senior career*
Years	Team	Apps	(Gls)
2015–2017	SKA-Khabarovsk	4	(0)
2017–2019	Sokol Saratov	7	(0)
2020–2021	Sokol Saratov	12	(0)
2021–2022	Saransk	15	(0)
2022–2024	Sokol Saratov	10	(0)
2024–	Ufa	13	(2)
- * Club domestic league appearances and goals as of 16 May 2026

David Tengizovich Ozmanov (Russian: Давид Тенгизович Озманов; born 31 January 1995) is a Russian football player who plays for Ufa.

== Club career ==
He made his debut in the Russian Football National League for FC SKA-Energiya Khabarovsk on 25 April 2016 in a game against FC Gazovik Orenburg.
