= Marat Mustafin =

Russian footballer and manager

Personal information
- Full name: Marat Fyaridyevich Mustafin
- Date of birth: 25 May 1971 (age 55)
- Place of birth: Saransk, Russian SFSR, USSR
- Height: 1.81 m (5 ft 11 1/2 in)
- Position: Midfielder

Senior career*
Years	Team	Apps	(Gls)
1987	Svetotekhnika Saransk	5	(0)
1987–1988	Fakel Saransk		
1989–1990	Svetotekhnika Saransk	45	(1)
1991	EVM Ruzayevka	8	(1)
1992–1997	Orbita Saransk		
1998–1999	Pochtovik Saransk		
2000	Rezinotekhnik Saransk		

Managerial career
- 2012–2013: Mordovia Saransk (reserves)
- 2013: Mordovia Saransk (caretaker)
- 2013: Mordovia Saransk (assistant)
- 2013: Mordovia Saransk (caretaker)
- 2013–2016: Mordovia Saransk (reserves)
- 2016: Mordovia Saransk (caretaker)
- 2016–2017: Mordovia Saransk (assistant)
- 2017: Mordovia Saransk (caretaker)
- 2017–2020: Mordovia Saransk
- * Club domestic league appearances and goals

Marat Fyaridyevich Mustafin (Russian: Марат Фяридьевич Мустафин; born 25 May 1971) is a Russian football manager and a former player.

In 2000 and 2001 he worked as a referee.
