= Oleg Vlasov =

Russian footballer

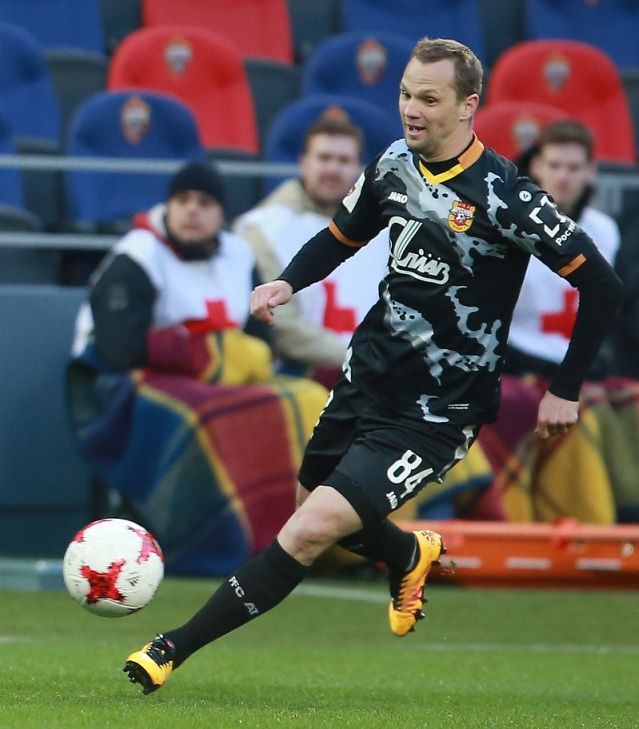
- Vlasov with Arsenal Tula in 2017

Personal information
- Full name: Oleg Sergeyevich Vlasov
- Date of birth: 10 December 1984 (age 41)
- Place of birth: Priladozhsky, Russian SFSR
- Height: 1.77 m (5 ft 10 in)
- Position: Midfielder

Youth career
- Kirovsk Sport School
- Smena St. Petersburg
- FC Izhorets St. Petersburg
- FC Kirovets St. Petersburg

Senior career*
| Years | Team | Apps | (Gls) |
| 2001 | FC Pikalyovo | | |
| 2002–2006 | FC Zenit St. Petersburg | 51 | (4) |
| 2006–2007 | FC Saturn Moscow Oblast | 11 | (0) |
| 2008–2013 | FC Terek Grozny | 58 | (1) |
| 2013–2014 | FC Torpedo Moscow | 23 | (3) |
| 2014–2016 | FC Mordovia Saransk | 59 | (3) |
| 2016–2017 | FC Arsenal Tula | 20 | (1) |
| 2017–2018 | FC Dynamo Saint Petersburg | 27 | (3) |
| 2018–2019 | FC Leningradets Leningrad Oblast | 11 | (1) |

International career
| 2004 | Russia U-21 | 4 | (0) |
- * Club domestic league appearances and goals

Oleg Sergeyevich Vlasov (Russian: Оле́г Серге́евич Вла́сов; born 10 December 1984) is a Russian former football player.

== Career statistics ==
As of 10 March 2018

| Club | Season | League | | | Cup | | Continental | | Other | | Total | |
| Club | Season | Division | Apps | Goals | Apps | Goals | Apps | Goals | Apps | Goals | Apps | Goals |
|---|---|---|---|---|---|---|---|---|---|---|---|---|
| Metallurg Pikalyovo | 2001 | Amateur League | – | | | | | | | | | |
| Zenit St. Petersburg | 2002 | Russian Premier League | 0 | 0 | 0 | 0 | 0 | 0 | – | | 0 | 0 |
| Zenit St. Petersburg | 2003 | Russian Premier League | 13 | 2 | 3 | 1 | – | | 5 (Note: Five appearances in the Russian Premier League Cup) | 0 | 21 | 3 |
| Zenit St. Petersburg | 2004 | Russian Premier League | 18 | 1 | 1 | 0 | 5 | 0 | – | | 24 | 1 |
| Zenit St. Petersburg | 2005 | Russian Premier League | 13 | 0 | 5 | 1 | 6 | 0 | – | | 24 | 1 |
| Zenit St. Petersburg | 2006 | Russian Premier League | 7 | 1 | 4 | 1 | 1 | 0 | – | | 12 | 2 |
| Zenit St. Petersburg | Total | | 51 | 4 | 13 | 3 | 12 | 0 | 5 | 0 | 81 | 7 |
| Saturn Ramenskoye | 2006 | Russian Premier League | 3 | 0 | 0 | 0 | – | | – | | 3 | 0 |
| Saturn Ramenskoye | 2007 | Russian Premier League | 8 | 0 | 1 | 1 | – | | – | | 9 | 1 |
| Saturn Ramenskoye | Total | | 11 | 0 | 1 | 1 | 0 | 0 | 0 | 0 | 12 | 1 |
| Terek Grozny | 2008 | Russian Premier League | 15 | 0 | 2 | 0 | – | | – | | 17 | 0 |
| Terek Grozny | 2009 | Russian Premier League | 16 | 0 | 0 | 0 | – | | – | | 16 | 0 |
| Terek Grozny | 2010 | Russian Premier League | 0 | 0 | 0 | 0 | – | | – | | 0 | 0 |
| Terek Grozny | 2011–12 | Russian Premier League | 25 | 1 | 3 | 0 | – | | – | | 28 | 1 |
| Terek Grozny | 2012–13 | Russian Premier League | 2 | 0 | 0 | 0 | – | | – | | 2 | 0 |
| Terek Grozny | Total | | 58 | 1 | 5 | 0 | 0 | 0 | 0 | 0 | 63 | 1 |
| Torpedo Moscow | 2013–14 | FNL | 23 | 3 | 0 | 0 | – | | 2 (Note: Two appearances in promotion play-offs) | 1 | 25 | 4 |
| Mordovia Saransk | 2014–15 | Russian Premier League | 29 | 2 | 2 | 1 | – | | – | | 31 | 3 |
| Mordovia Saransk | 2015–16 | Russian Premier League | 30 | 1 | 1 | 0 | – | | – | | 31 | 1 |
| Mordovia Saransk | Total | | 59 | 3 | 3 | 1 | 0 | 0 | 0 | 0 | 62 | 4 |
| Arsenal Tula | 2016–17 | Russian Premier League | 20 | 1 | 0 | 0 | – | | 1 (Note: One appearance in relegation play-offs) | 0 | 21 | 1 |
| Dynamo St. Petersburg | 2017–18 | FNL | 18 | 3 | 1 | 0 | – | | – | | 19 | 3 |
| Career total | | | 240 | 15 | 23 | 5 | 12 | 0 | 8 | 1 | 283 | 21 |

== Achievements ==
- Russian Premier League runner-up: 2003
