= Ruslan Kausarov =

Russian footballer

Personal information
- Full name: Ruslan Ramilevich Kausarov
- Date of birth: 11 June 1996 (age 30)
- Place of birth: Ufa, Russia
- Height: 1.66 m (5 ft 5 in)
- Position: Midfielder

Senior career*
Years	Team	Apps	(Gls)
2012	FC Akademiya-D Togliatti		
2013–2014	FC Kuban Krasnodar	0	(0)
2014–2016	FC Rubin Kazan	0	(0)
2015	→ FC Rubin-2 Kazan	1	(0)
2016–2018	FC Kuban-2 Krasnodar	46	(1)
2017–2018	FC Kuban Krasnodar	8	(0)

International career
2012	Russia U-16	5	(0)
2012–2013	Russia U-17	7	(0)
- * Club domestic league appearances and goals

Ruslan Ramilevich Kausarov (Russian: Руслан Рамилевич Каусаров; born 11 June 1996) is a Russian former football player.

== Club career ==
He made his debut in the Russian Professional Football League for FC Rubin-2 Kazan on 18 May 2015 in a game against FC Syzran-2003.

He made his Russian Football National League debut for FC Kuban Krasnodar on 5 August 2017 in a game against FC Tyumen.
