= Vladislav Adayev =

Russian football player

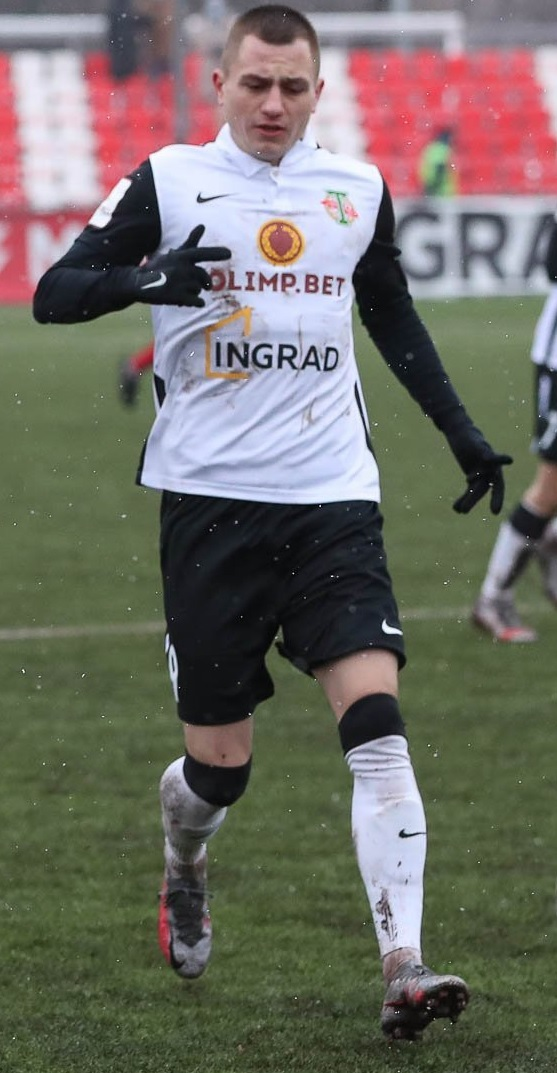
- Adayev with Torpedo Moscow in 2021

Personal information
- Full name: Vladislav Stanislavovich Adayev
- Date of birth: 14 March 1996 (age 30)
- Place of birth: Saransk, Russia
- Height: 1.77 m (5 ft 10 in)
- Positions: Midfielder; forward

Youth career
- 2007–2016: FC Mordovia Saransk

Senior career*
Years	Team	Apps	(Gls)
2017–2019	FC Mordovia Saransk	74	(6)
2020–2022	FC Torpedo Moscow	57	(5)
2022	FC Rodina Moscow	15	(0)
2023–2024	FC Chernomorets Novorossiysk	17	(0)
2024–2025	FC Ufa	17	(3)
2025–2026	FC Volgar Astrakhan	24	(2)
- * Club domestic league appearances and goals as of 13 June 2026

Vladislav Stanislavovich Adayev (Russian: Владислав Станиславович Адаев; born 14 March 1996) is a Russian football player.

== Club career ==
He made his debut in the Russian Football National League for FC Mordovia Saransk on 26 March 2017 in a game against FC Fakel Voronezh.

== Honours ==
Torpedo Moscow

- Russian Football National League : 2021-22
