= Dalibor Stevanović =

Slovenian footballer (born 1984)

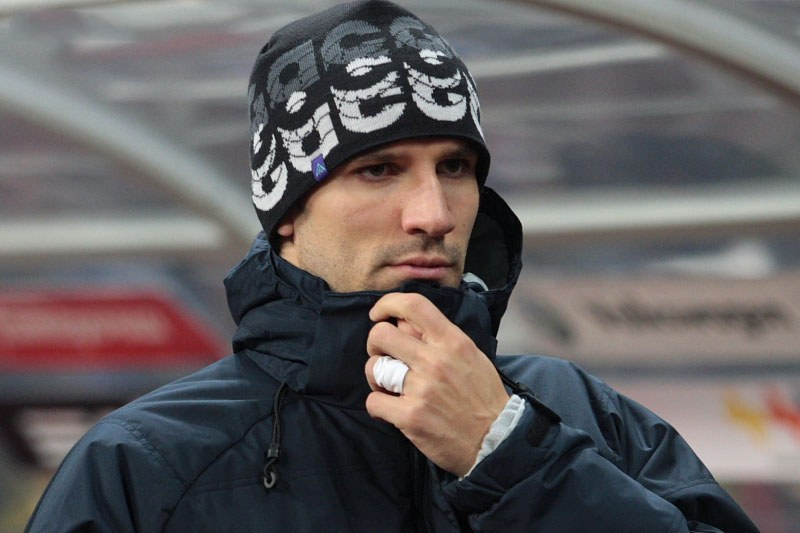
- Stevanović in 2009

Personal information
- Full name: Dalibor Stevanović
- Date of birth: 27 September 1984 (age 42)
- Place of birth: Ljubljana, SR Slovenia, SFR Yugoslavia
- Height: 1.83 m (6 ft 0 in)
- Position: Midfielder

Team information
- Current team: Stade Lausanne Ouchy (manager)

Youth career
- –2002: Olimpija
- 2002–2003: Domžale

Senior career*
Years	Team	Apps	(Gls)
2002–2006	Domžale	79	(25)
2006–2008	Real Sociedad	19	(1)
2008	→ Alavés (loan)	11	(0)
2008–2009	Maccabi Petah Tikva	10	(0)
2009–2011	Vitesse	55	(8)
2011	Volyn Lutsk	7	(0)
2012–2014	Śląsk Wrocław	58	(7)
2014–2015	Torpedo Moscow	26	(3)
2015–2016	Mordovia	27	(2)
2016–2017	Slaven Belupo	12	(0)
2017–2019	Servette	26	(1)
2018–2019	→ Stade Nyonnais (loan)	26	(0)
2019–2020	Stade Nyonnais	8	(0)

International career
2003–2005	Slovenia U20	5	(1)
2004–2006	Slovenia U21	10	(4)
2006–2015	Slovenia	22	(1)

Managerial career
- 2024–: Stade Lausanne Ouchy
- * Club domestic league appearances and goals

Dalibor Stevanović (born 27 September 1984) is a Slovenian professional football manager and former player. He is currently in charge of Swiss Challenge League club Stade Lausanne Ouchy.

== Club career ==
In January 2009, Stevanović signed a contract with Vitesse Arnhem.

== International career ==
Stevanović earned his first cap for Slovenia in a 1–0 victory against Cyprus in February 2006. He scored his first goal for Slovenia on 14 October 2009 in a 2010 World Cup qualifying match against San Marino. He earned a total of 22 caps, scoring 1 goal.

== Career statistics ==
=== International ===
Appearances and goals by national team and year
National team	Year	Apps	Goals
Slovenia
Slovenia	2006	2	0
Slovenia	2007	4	0
Slovenia	2008	3	0
Slovenia	2009	6	1
Slovenia	2010	1	0
Slovenia	2013	1	0
Slovenia	2014	4	0
Slovenia	2015	1	0
Total		22	1

Scores and results list Slovenia's goal tally first, score column indicates score after each Stevanović goal.

List of international goals scored by Dalibor Stevanovič
No.	Date	Venue	Opponent	Score	Result	Competition
1	14 October 2009	Stadio Olimpico, Serravalle, San Marino	San Marino	2–0	3–0	FIFA World Cup 2010 qualification

== Honours ==
Śląsk Wrocław

- Ekstraklasa: 2011–12
- Polish Super Cup: 2012
