= Ilie Cebanu =

Moldovan footballer (born 1986)

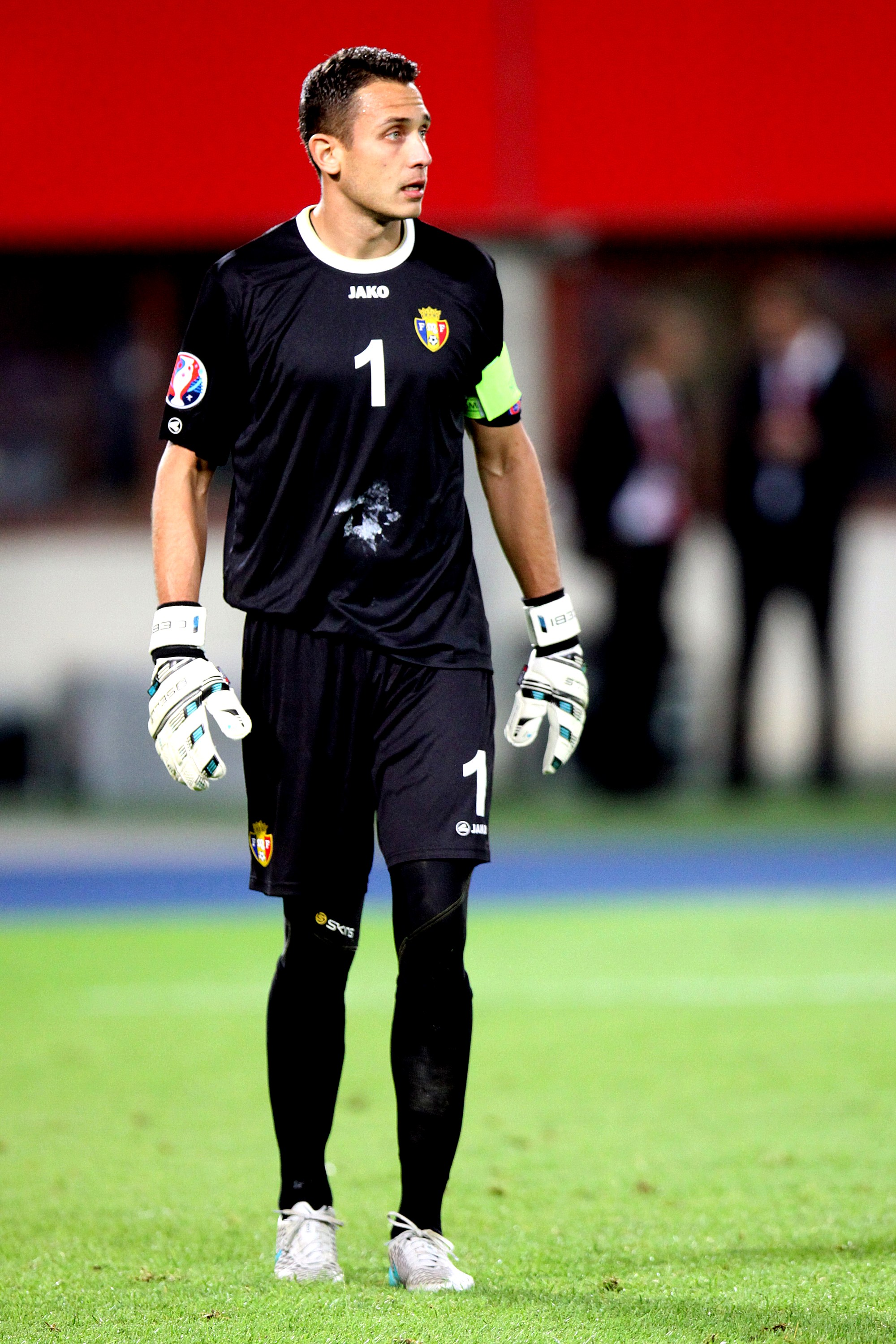
- Cebanu with Moldova in 2015

Personal information
- Date of birth: 29 December 1986 (age 39)
- Place of birth: Chișinău, Moldavian SSR, Soviet Union
- Height: 1.89 m (6 ft 2 1/2 in)
- Position: Goalkeeper

Youth career
- 1992–2003: Zimbru Chişinău

Senior career*
Years	Team	Apps	(Gls)
2003–2004	Zimbru Chişinău	1	(0)
2004–2005	Kärnten Amateure		
2005	St. Veit		
2006	Sturm Graz Amateure		
2006–2007	Kapfenberger SV	1	(0)
2007	→ Kindberg (loan)	8	(0)
2007–2009	Wisła Kraków	6	(0)
2007–2009	Wisła Kraków (ME)	44	(0)
2010–2012	Rubin Kazan	0	(0)
2011	→ Volgar-Gazprom Astrakhan (loan)	0	(0)
2012	→ Tom Tomsk (loan)	0	(0)
2012–2014	Tom Tomsk	10	(0)
2014–2017	Mordovia Saransk	26	(0)
2017	Zimbru Chișinău	8	(0)
Total		104	(0)

International career
2004–2008	Moldova U21	18	(0)
2006–2018	Moldova	31	(0)
- * Club domestic league appearances and goals

Ilie Cebanu (born 29 December 1986) is a Moldovan former professional footballer who played as a goalkeeper.

== Honours ==
Wisła Kraków

- Ekstraklasa: 2007–08

Wisła Kraków (ME)

- Młoda Ekstraklasa: 2007–08

== Statistics ==
As of 17 January 2010

Appearances and goals by club, season and competition
Club	Season	League			National cup (Note: Includes Polish Cup)		Europe		Total	
Club	Season	Division	Apps	Goals	Apps	Goals	Apps	Goals	Apps	Goals
Kapfenberger SV	2006–07	Erste Liga	1	0	0	0	—		1	0
SVA Kindberg (loan)	2006–07	Landesliga	8	0	—		—		8	0
Wisła Kraków	2007–08	Ekstraklasa	1	0	1	0	—		2	0
Wisła Kraków	2008–09	Ekstraklasa	0	0	1	0	0	0	1	0
Wisła Kraków	2009–10	Ekstraklasa	5	0	2	0	0	0	7	0
Wisła Kraków	Total		6	0	4	0	0	0	10	0
Career total			15	0	4	0	0	0	19	0
