= FC Mordovia Saransk =

Russian football club

FC Mordovia
- Full name: Футбольный клуб Мордовия Саранск (Football Club Mordovia Saransk)
- Nicknames: Krasno-Belo-Siniye (The Red-White-Blue); Mordva (Mordovians)
- Founded: 1961
- Dissolved: 2020
- Ground: Mordovia Arena
- Capacity: 44,442
- Chairman: Nikolai Levin
- Manager: Marat Mustafin
- League: –
- 2019–20: FNL, 20th (relegated)
- Website: www.fc-mordovia.ru
Home colours	Away colours	Third colours

FC Mordovia Saransk (Russian: ФК Мордовия Саранск) was a Russian association football club from Saransk, Republic of Mordovia. In its current state it was formed in 2005, through the merger of Biokhimik-Mordovia and Lisma-Mordovia.

== History ==
The club was founded in 1961. In 2010, the club won promotion to the Russian First Division. On 8 May 2012, Mordovia beat Shinnik Yaroslavl 2–0 at home. This result meant that with a round to spare the team won promotion to the Russian Premier League for the 2012–13 season for the first time in its history. It was relegated back to the second tier after one season, and then returned to the Premier League for the 2014–15 season, taking 8th spot. After the next 2015–16 season, it was once again relegated. At the end of the 2016–17 season they were relegated for the second year in a row, to the third-tier Russian Professional Football League. They returned to the second tier after one season down for 2018–19 season.

On 18 June 2020, club director Nikolay Levin confirmed that the club had failed FNL licensing for the 2020–21 season, and it had not been determined which league the club would play in. The club was not admitted to the 2020–21 Russian Professional Football League either, thus losing professional status.

=== Name changes ===
- 1961: Stroitel Saransk
- 1962–71: Spartak Saransk
- 1972–79: Elektrosvet Saransk
- 1980–02: Svetotekhnika Saransk
- 2003–04: Lisma-Mordovia Saransk
- 2005–: Mordovia Saransk (merged with Biokhimik-Mordovia).

=== Domestic history ===
Season	League									Russian Cup	Top goalscorer		Manager
Season	Div.	Pos.	Pl.	W	D	L	GS	GA	P	Russian Cup	Name	League	Manager
2009	3rd	1st	30	24	5	1	68	13	77	Quarterfinal	(Russia) Dmitri Sysuyev	14	(Russia) F.Shcherbachenko
2010	2nd	6th	38	16	10	12	53	40	58	Round of 32	(Russia) Ruslan Mukhametshin	13	(Russia) F.Shcherbachenko
2011–12	2nd	1st	52	29	13	10	91	56	100	Round of 32	(Russia) Ruslan Mukhametshin	31	(Russia) F.Shcherbachenko
2012–13	1st	15th	30	5	5	20	30	57	20	Round of 16	(Russia) Ruslan Mukhametshin	11	(Russia) F.Shcherbachenko / (Russia) V.Bibikov / (Romania) D.Munteanu
2013–14	2nd	1st	36	22	7	7	59	30	73	Round of 16	(Russia) Aleksei Ivanov	11	(Russia) S.Podpaly / (Russia) M.Mustafin / (Ukraine) Y.Maksymov
2014–15	1st	8th	30	11	5	14	22	43	38	Quarterfinal	(Serbia) Marko Lomić	3	(Russia) Y.Semin
2015–16	1st	16th	30	4	12	14	30	50	24	Round of 32	(Russia) Yevgeni Lutsenko	10	(Russia) A.Gordeyev / (Russia) M.Mustafin
2016–17	2nd	17th	38	11	7	20	39	50	40	Round of 16	(Armenia) Artur Sarkisov (Russia) Pavel Deobald	5	

== Honours ==
=== Domestic ===
- PFL Cup
  - Winners (1): 2009
- Russian National Football League
  - Champions (2): 2011–12, 2013–14

== Notable players ==
Had international caps for their respective countries. Players whose name is listed in bold represented their countries while playing for Mordovia.

Russia

- (Russia) Evgeni Aldonin
- (Russia) Anton Bobyor
- (Russia) Dmitri Kirichenko
- (Russia) Kirill Panchenko
- (Russia) **Viktor Vasin**
- (Russia) Oleg Veretennikov

Former USSR countries
Armenia

- (Armenia) **Artur Sarkisov**
- (Armenia) David Yurchenko

Belarus

- (Belarus) **Igor Shitov**

Georgia

- (Georgia (country)) **Akaki Khubutia**
- (Georgia (country)) Mamuka Kobakhidze
- (Georgia (country)) **Nukri Revishvili**

Kazakhstan

- (Kazakhstan) Vitaliy Abramov
- (Kazakhstan) Aleksei Muldarov
- (Kazakhstan) Yevgeni Tarasov
- (Kazakhstan) Sergey Zhunenko

Lithuania

- (Lithuania) Darius Maciulevičius

Moldova

- (Moldova) **Ilie Cebanu**
- (Moldova) Iulian Erhan
- (Moldova) **Alexandru Suvorov**

Turkmenistan

- (Turkmenistan) Artem Nazarow

Uzbekistan

- (Uzbekistan) Aleksandr Sayun

Africa
Ivory Coast

- (Ivory Coast) Elysée

Senegal

- (Senegal) Ibrahima Niasse

Europe
Belgium

- (Belgium) Danilo

Croatia

- (Croatia) Tomislav Dujmović

Montenegro

- (Montenegro) **Vladimir Božović**

Netherlands

- (Netherlands) Lorenzo Ebecilio

Portugal

- (Portugal) Yannick Djaló

Romania

- (Romania) Daniel Oprița

Serbia

- (Serbia) Marko Lomić
- (Serbia) Aleksandar Simčević
- (Serbia) Milan Perendija

Slovenia

- (Slovenia) Borut Semler
- (Slovenia) **Dalibor Stevanović**
- (Slovenia) Dalibor Volaš

South America
Chile

- (Chile) **Gerson Acevedo**

Suriname

- (Suriname) Mitchell Donald

== Managerial history ==
- (Russia) Yuri Utkin (March 2005 – 8 December)
- (Russia) Fyodor Shcherbachenko (1 January 2009 – 19 November 2012)
- (Russia) Vladimir Bibikov (caretaker) (20 November 2012 – 28 December 2012)
- (Romania) Dorinel Munteanu (29 December 2012 – 30 July 2013)
- (Russia) Sergei Podpaly (1 July 2013 – 9 August 2013)
- (Russia) Marat Mustafin (9 August 2013 – 21 August 2013)
- (Ukraine) Yuriy Maksymov (21 August 2013 – 18 May 2014)
- (Russia) Yuri Semin (27 May 2014 - 30 May 2015)
