= 2014–15 FC Torpedo Moscow season =

FC Torpedo Moscow
2014–15 season
- Chairman: Aleksandr Tukmanov
- Manager: Nikolai Savichev
- Stadium: Saturn Stadium
- Russian Premier League: 15th (Relegated)
- Russian Cup: Round of 16 vs CSKA Moscow
- Top goalscorer: League: Anton Putsila (4); All: Anton Putsila (4)
Home colours	Away colours

The 2014–15 FC Torpedo Moscow season was the club's 1st season back in the Russian Premier League, the highest tier of association football in Russia, since their relegation in 2006. Torpedo Moscow will also be taking part in the Russian Cup.

== Season events ==
On 19 May, Torpedo Moscow players boycotted training as a result of not being paid since January.

== Squad ==
As of 15 January 2015

Note: Flags indicate national team as defined under FIFA eligibility rules; some limited exceptions apply. Players may hold more than one non-FIFA nationality.

No.	Pos.	Nation	Player
3	DF	POL	Adam Kokoszka
4	FW	ISL	Arnór Smárason (loan from Helsingborg)
5	DF	RUS	Ivan Knyazev
6	DF	LTU	Tomas Mikuckis
7	MF	RUS	Semyon Fomin
9	DF	RUS	Kirill Kombarov (on loan from Spartak Moscow)
10	FW	RUS	Sergei Davydov (on loan from Rubin)
11	MF	RUS	Reziuan Mirzov
13	GK	CRO	Goran Blažević
14	MF	BLR	Anton Putsila
15	DF	RUS	Yegor Tarakanov
16	MF	SLO	Dalibor Stevanović
17	DF	RUS	Mikhail Bagayev
18	MF	RUS	Aleksei Pugin

No.	Pos.	Nation	Player
19	FW	EST	Sergei Zenjov
20	MF	RUS	Vadim Steklov
21	MF	RUS	Denis Voynov
22	FW	RUS	Konstantin Bazelyuk (loan from CSKA Moscow)
23	MF	RUS	Diniyar Bilyaletdinov (on loan from Spartak Moscow)
27	FW	POR	Hugo Vieira
30	GK	BLR	Yuri Zhevnov
33	DF	RUS	Vladimir Rykov
34	DF	RUS	Aleksandr Katsalapov
71	DF	RUS	Georgi Tigiyev
77	FW	RUS	Aleksandr Salugin
98	GK	RUS	Aleksandr Budakov
—	GK	RUS	Andrei Lunev

=== Out on loan ===
Note: Flags indicate national team as defined under FIFA eligibility rules; some limited exceptions apply. Players may hold more than one non-FIFA nationality.

No.	Pos.	Nation	Player
12	DF	RUS	Aleksandr Tsybikov (at Zenit Penza)

No.	Pos.	Nation	Player
66	MF	RUS	Daniil Savichev (at Saturn Ramenskoye)
—	DF	RUS	Sergei Yefimov (at TSK Simferopol)

== Transfers ==
=== Summer ===
In: Note: Flags indicate national team as defined under FIFA eligibility rules; some limited exceptions apply. Players may hold more than one non-FIFA nationality.

No.	Pos.	Nation	Player
3	DF	POL	Adam Kokoszka (from (Poland) Śląsk Wrocław)
7	MF	RUS	Semyon Fomin (from (Russia) Rotor Volgograd)
8	DF	AUS	Ivan Franjic (from (Australia) Brisbane Roar)
9	DF	RUS	Kirill Kombarov (loan from (Russia) Spartak Moscow)
10	FW	RUS	Sergei Davydov (on loan from (Russia) Rubin Kazan)
11	MF	RUS	Reziuan Mirzov (from (Russia) Zvezda Ryazan)
13	GK	CRO	Goran Blažević (from (Bulgaria) Levski Sofia)
14	MF	BLR	Anton Putsila (from (Russia) Volga Nizhny Novgorod)
16	MF	SLO	Dalibor Stevanović (from (Poland) Śląsk Wrocław)
18	FW	RUS	Aleksei Pugin (from (Russia) Rotor Volgograd)
21	MF	RUS	Denis Voynov (end of loan to (Russia) Fakel Voronezh)
22	GK	RUS	Andrei Lunev (end of loan to (Russia) Kaluga)
23	MF	RUS	Diniyar Bilyaletdinov (loan from (Russia) Spartak Moscow)
26	MF	POR	Márcio Abreu (from (Russia) Krasnodar)
27	FW	POR	Hugo Vieira (from (Portugal) Braga)
30	GK	BLR	Yuri Zhevnov
33	DF	RUS	Vladimir Rykov (from (Russia) Dynamo Moscow)
71	DF	RUS	Georgi Tigiyev (from (Russia) Kuban Krasnodar)
—	DF	RUS	Sergei Yefimov (end of loan to (Russia) Zenit Penza)
—	MF	RUS	Oleg Polyakov (end of loan to (Russia) Tyumen)

Out: Note: Flags indicate national team as defined under FIFA eligibility rules; some limited exceptions apply. Players may hold more than one non-FIFA nationality.

No.	Pos.	Nation	Player
2	DF	SVK	Lukáš Tesák (to (Russia) Arsenal Tula)
4	DF	RUS	Dmitry Aydov (to (Russia) Anzhi Makhachkala)
7	MF	RUS	Denis Boyarintsev (retired)
8	MF	RUS	Denis Bolshakov (to (Russia) Domodedovo Moscow)
14	GK	RUS	Yevgeni Konyukhov (to (Russia) Krylia Sovetov Samara)
18	MF	CRO	Matija Dvorneković (end of loan from (Russia) Volga Nizhny Novgorod)
26	MF	POR	Márcio Abreu (Retired)
38	MF	RUS	Maksim Burchenko (to (Russia) Luch-Energiya Vladivostok)
44	MF	RUS	Lev Kornilov (to (Russia) Saturn Ramenskoye)
50	MF	RUS	Viktor Svezhov (end of loan from (Russia) Krylia Sovetov Samara)
70	MF	RUS	Nikita Vasilyev (end of loan from (Russia) Rostov)
84	MF	RUS	Oleg Vlasov (to (Russia) Mordovia Saransk)
—	DF	RUS	Sergei Yefimov (loan to (Russia) TSK Simferopol)
—	MF	UKR	Denys Skepskyi (to (Russia) Sakhalin Yuzhno-Sakhalinsk)

=== Winter ===
In: Note: Flags indicate national team as defined under FIFA eligibility rules; some limited exceptions apply. Players may hold more than one non-FIFA nationality.

No.	Pos.	Nation	Player
4	FW	ISL	Arnór Smárason (on loan from (Sweden) Helsingborg)
19	FW	EST	Sergei Zenjov (from (England) Blackpool)
22	FW	RUS	Konstantin Bazelyuk (loan from (Russia) CSKA Moscow)
57	MF	RUS	Filipp Dvoretskov
60	DF	RUS	Viktor Chigiryov (from (Russia) Meteor Balashikha school)
68	FW	RUS	Roman Drozdov (from (Russia) Mordovia Saransk academy)
99	DF	RUS	Nikita Cherepanov (from (Latvia) Spartaks Jūrmala)

Out: Note: Flags indicate national team as defined under FIFA eligibility rules; some limited exceptions apply. Players may hold more than one non-FIFA nationality.

No.	Pos.	Nation	Player
3	DF	POL	Adam Kokoszka
8	DF	AUS	Ivan Franjic
12	DF	RUS	Aleksandr Tsybikov (on loan to (Russia) Zenit Penza)
25	DF	RUS	Ivan Novoseltsev (to (Russia) Rostov)
40	MF	RUS	Yuri Kuleshov (to (Russia) Sakhalin Yuzhno-Sakhalinsk)
55	GK	LTU	Saulius Klevinskas
66	MF	RUS	Daniil Savichev (on loan to (Russia) Saturn Ramenskoye)
88	FW	RUS	Igor Shevchenko (to (Russia) Ufa)

== Competitions ==
=== Premier League ===
==== Results by round ====
Round	1	2	3	4	5	6	7	8	9	10	11	12	13	14	15	16	17	18	19	20	21	22	23	24	25	26	27	28	29	30
Ground	A	A	H	A	H	A	A	H	A	A	H	H	H	H	A	A	H	A	H	H	A	A	H	A	H	H	A	A	H	H
Result	L	L	D	W	L	L	L	L	L	D	D	L	L	W	D	W	D	D	D	L	W	L	D	L	L	D	D	D	W	W
Position	12	16	13	10	12	14	14	13	12	14	14	15	15	14	14	13	12	12	12	13	12	14	14	15	16	16	16	16	15	15

Updated to match(es) played on 27 May 2015. Source: Russian Premier League
A = Away; H = Home; W = Win; D = Draw; L = Loss

==== Matches ====
2 August 2014 1	CSKA Moscow	4–1	Torpedo Moscow	Moscow
21:30 MSK (UTC+4)	Doumbia 35' (pen.); Panchenko 45+1'; Aydov 49' (o.g.); Vitinho 81'	Summary	Fomin 5'; Rykov (red card) 33'	Stadium: Arena Khimki; Attendance: 11,000; Referee: Igor Fedotov

9 August 2014 2	Zenit St. Petersburg	8–1	Torpedo Moscow	Saint Petersburg
17:00 MSK (UTC+4)	Hulk 36' (pen.), 54'; Smolnikov 26'; Rondón 33', 47'; Shatov 62'; Kerzhakov 72' (pen.), 78'	Report	Aydov 86' (pen.)	Stadium: Petrovsky Stadium; Attendance: 9,000; Referee: Igor Nizovtsev

12 August 2014 3	Torpedo Moscow	1–1	Amkar Perm	Ramensky District
20:00 MSK (UTC+4)	Rykov 43'	Summary	Picusceac 62'	Stadium: Saturn Stadium; Attendance: 3,000; Referee: Vitali Meshkov

16 August 2014 4	Ural	0–2	Torpedo Moscow	Yekaterinburg
17:00 MSK (UTC+4)		Summary	Pugin 73'; Ottesen 90' (o.g.)	Stadium: Central Stadium; Attendance: 8,300; Referee: Vitaly Rushakov

24 August 2014 5	Torpedo Moscow	0–3	Krasnodar	Ramenskoye
16:30 MSK (UTC+4)		Summary	Bystrov 62'; Wánderson 64'; Pereyra 90+3'	Stadium: Saturn Stadium; Attendance: 2,800; Referee: Mikhail Vilkov

30 August 2014 6	Mordovia Saransk	1–0	Torpedo Moscow	Saransk
14:00 MSK (UTC+4)	Lutsenko 21'; Shitov (yellow card) 40' (yellow-red card) 59'	Summary		Stadium: Start Stadium; Attendance: 3,970; Referee: Vladimir Moskalyov

14 September 2014 7	Spartak Moscow	3–1	Torpedo Moscow	Moscow
13:30 MSK (UTC+4)	Promes 34', 71'; Jurado 73'	Summary	Vieira	Stadium: Otkrytie Arena; Attendance: 36,058; Referee: Sergey Karasev

22 September 2014 8	Torpedo Moscow	1–3	Dynamo Moscow	Ramensky District
20:00 MSK (UTC+4)	Katsalapov 12'	Summary	Ionov 10', 83'; Dzsudzsák 90'	Stadium: Saturn Stadium; Attendance: 4,000; Referee: Sergei Ivanov

29 September 2014 9	Rubin Kazan'	2–1	Torpedo Moscow	Kazan
20:00 MSK (UTC+4)	Eduardo 68'; Georgiev 87'	Summary	Stevanović 15' (pen.)	Stadium: Kazan Arena; Attendance: 5,800; Referee: Sergey Lapochkin

20 October 2014 10	Ufa	1–1	Torpedo Moscow	Ufa
17:00 MSK (UTC+4)	Handžić 25'	Summary	Bilyaletdinov 86'	Stadium: Dynamo Stadium; Attendance: 2,800; Referee: Sergey Kulikov

25 October 2014 11	Torpedo Moscow	0–0	Kuban Krasnodar	Ramensky District
18:00 MSK (UTC+4)	Vieira (yellow card) 75'; Putsila (yellow card) 83'	Summary	Rabiu (yellow card) 47'	Stadium: Saturn Stadium; Attendance: 1,700; Referee: Vladimir Moskalyov

3 November 2014 12	Torpedo Moscow	0–1	Arsenal Tula	Ramensky District
14:00 MSK (UTC+3)		Summary	Maloyan 48'	Stadium: Saturn Stadium; Attendance: 2,200; Referee: Igor Nizovtsev

8 November 2014 13	Torpedo Moscow	0–1	Lokomotiv Moscow	Ramensky District
16:00 MSK (UTC+3)		Summary	N'Doye 60'	Stadium: Saturn Stadium; Attendance: 5,150; Referee: Aleksandr Egorov

22 November 2014 14	Torpedo Moscow	2–1	Rostov	Ramensky District
14:15 MSK (UTC+3)	Stevanović 22'; Salugin 52'; Rykov (yellow card) 89'	Summary	Goreux (yellow card) 10'; Torbinski 90'; Doumbia (yellow card) 90+3'	Stadium: Saturn Stadium; Attendance: 4,200; Referee: Mikhail Vilkov

29 November 2014 15	Kuban Krasnodar	1–1	Torpedo Moscow	Krasnodar
20:15 MSK (UTC+3)	Baldé 34'; Kulik (yellow card) 82'	Summary	Bilyaletdinov 7'; Steklov (yellow card) 52'; Kombarov (yellow card) 87'; Fomin (yellow card) 88'	Stadium: Kuban Stadium; Attendance: 3,362; Referee: Kirill Levnikov

3 December 2014 16	Terek Grozny	0–1	Torpedo Moscow	Grozny
20:00 MSK (UTC+3)	Lebedenko (yellow card) 58'; Komorowski (yellow card) 60'; Kuzyayev (yellow card) 68'; Ivanov (yellow card) 90+2'; Utsiyev (yellow card) 90+3'	Summary	Putsila 45'; Stevanović (yellow card) 77'	Stadium: Akhmat-Arena; Attendance: 11,231; Referee: Sergey Lapochkin

8 December 2014 17	Torpedo Moscow	2–2	Ufa	Ramensky District
17:00 MSK (UTC+3)	Putsila 40'; Novoseltsev (yellow card) 57'; Mirzov 65'	Summary	Diego 20'; Tishkin (red card) 22'; Tumasyan 37'	Stadium: Saturn Stadium; Attendance: 1,050; Referee: Alexey Nikolaev

9 March 2015 18	Amkar Perm'	0–0	Torpedo Moscow	Perm
13:00 MSK (UTC+3)	Prudnikov (yellow card) 41'; Arzumanyan (yellow card) 80'; Butko (yellow card) 90+2'	Summary	Bilyaletdinov (yellow card) 70'; Katsalapov (yellow card) 89'; Rykov (yellow card) 90+3'	Stadium: Zvezda Stadium; Attendance: 8,400; Referee: Sergey Kulikov

15 March 2015 19	Torpedo Moscow	1–1	Zenit St.Petersburg	Ramensky District
16:30 MSK (UTC+3)	Stevanović (yellow card) 88'; Smárason 90+1'	Summary	Hulk 35'	Stadium: Saturn Stadium; Attendance: 6,358; Referee: Mikhail Vilkov

21 March 2015 20	Torpedo Moscow	0–1	Spartak Moscow	Moscow
19:00 MSK (UTC+4)	Rykov (yellow card) 42'; Katsalapov (yellow card) 79'; Bilyaletdinov (red card) 90+2'	Summary	Promes 21'; Källström (yellow card) 43'; João Carlos (yellow card) 88'; Davydov (yellow card) 89'	Stadium: Otkrytie Arena; Attendance: 20,147; Referee: Sergey Lapochkin

5 April 2015 21	Arsenal Tula	1–3	Torpedo Moscow	Tula
20:15 MSK (UTC+3)	Maloyan 49'; Costea (yellow card) 65'	Summary	Pugin 42'; Mikuckis (yellow card) 46'; Katsalapov (yellow card) 57'; Kombarov 62'; Putsila 71'	Stadium: Arsenal Stadium; Attendance: 10,500; Referee: Aleksandr Egorov

8 April 2015 22	Lokomotiv Moscow	2–0	Torpedo Moscow	Moscow
20:00 MSK (UTC+3)	Fernandes (yellow card) 43' (goal) 71', 74' (pen.); Tarasov (yellow card) 45+1'; Miranchuk (yellow card) 90+2'	Summary	Rykov (red card) 45+1'; Mikuckis (yellow card) 73'	Stadium: Lokomotiv Stadium; Attendance: 9,721; Referee: Alexey Nikolaev

13 April 2015 23	Torpedo Moscow	0–0	Terek Grozny	Ramensky District
18:00 MSK (UTC+3)	Franjic (yellow card) 68'	Summary	Komorowski (yellow card) 34'; Maurício (yellow card) 61' (yellow-red card) 90'; Ivanov (yellow card) 69'	Stadium: Saturn Stadium; Attendance: 14,000; Referee: Vitaly Rushakov

20 April 2015 24	Rostov	1–0	Torpedo Moscow	Rostov-on-Don
19:30 MSK (UTC+3)	Dyakov 78' (pen.); Gațcan (yellow card) 86'; Torbinski (yellow card) 87'; Azmoun (yellow card) 90+3'	Summary	Katsalapov (yellow card) 35'; Putsila (yellow card) 40'; Kokoszka (yellow card) 72'; Rykov (yellow card) 77'; Mirzov (yellow card) 77'	Stadium: Olimp-2; Attendance: 6,015; Referee: Mikhail Vilkov

25 April 2015 25	Torpedo Moscow	0–2	CSKA Moscow	Ramenskoye
17:00 MSK (UTC+3)	Stevanović (yellow card) 45+2'; Steklov (yellow card) 80'; Mikuckis (yellow card) 86'	Summary	Schennikov (yellow card) 5'; Akinfeev (yellow card) 45+2'; Strandberg 50'; Natcho 69'	Stadium: Saturn Stadium; Attendance: 0 Referee: Aleksey Eskov

3 May 2015 26	Torpedo Moscow	2–2	Rubin Kazan'	Ramensky District
18:30 MSK (UTC+4)	Mikuckis (yellow card) 45+1'; Putsila (yellow card) 75'; Kombarov 78'; Smárason 89'; Zenjov (yellow card) 90+2'	Summary	Kvirkvelia (yellow card) 6' (goal) 23'; Ozdoev 71' (yellow card) 77'	Stadium: Saturn Stadium; Referee: Sergey Kulikov

10 May 2015 27	Dynamo Moscow	0–0	Torpedo Moscow	Khimki
16:00 MSK (UTC+3)	Rotenberg (yellow card) 45'; Samba (yellow card) 87'	Summary	Vieira (yellow card) 25'	Stadium: Arena Khimki; Attendance: 5,508; Referee: Sergei Ivanov

17 May 2015 28	Krasnodar	2–2	Torpedo Moscow	Krasnodar
18:30 MSK (UTC+3)	Wánderson 25' (pen.); Pereyra (yellow card) 27'; Granqvist (yellow card) 43'; Zhevnov 63' (o.g.); Bystrov (yellow card) 76'	Summary	Rykov (yellow card) 24'; Steklov (yellow card) 20'; Putsila 59'; Kombarov (yellow card) 62' (goal) 74'	Stadium: Kuban Stadium; Attendance: 9,780; Referee: Kirill Levnikov

23 May 2015 29	Torpedo Moscow	3–1	Ural	Ramensky District
15:30 MSK (UTC+3)	Katsalapov (yellow card) 8'; Vieira 30' (pen.), 63' (pen.); Stevanovic 57'	Summary	Fontanello 2' (yellow card) 20'; Zabolotnyi (red card) 26'; Smolov (yellow card) 66'	Stadium: Saturn Stadium; Referee: Vladimir Moskalyov

30 May 2015 30	Torpedo Moscow	2–0	Mordovia Saransk	Ramensky District
13:30 MSK (UTC+3)	Rykov 17'; Pugin 90'	Summary	Nakhushev (yellow card) 18'; Ebecilio (yellow card) 61'; Samodin (yellow card) 67'	Stadium: Saturn Stadium; Attendance: 5,300; Referee: Mikhail Vilkov

==== League table ====
Pos	Team	Pld	W	D	L	GF	GA	GD	Pts	Qualification or relegation
12	Ufa	30	7	10	13	26	39	−13	31	
13	Ural Sverdlovsk Oblast (O)	30	9	3	18	31	44	−13	30	Qualification for the Relegation play-offs
14	Rostov (O)	30	7	8	15	27	51	−24	29	Qualification for the Relegation play-offs
15	Torpedo Moscow (R)	30	6	11	13	28	45	−17	29	Relegation to Professional Football League
16	Arsenal Tula (R)	30	7	4	19	20	46	−26	25	Relegation to Football National League

Source: Russian Premier League
Rules for classification: 1) points; 2) number of matches won; 3) head-to-head points; 4) head-to-head wins; 5) head-to-head goal difference; 6) head-to-head goals; 7) number of head-to-head away goals; 8) goal difference; 9) number of goals scored; 10) number of away goals scored
(O) Play-off winners; (R) Relegated

=== Russian Cup ===
25 September 2015 Round of 32	Fakel Voronezh	1–2 (a.e.t.)	Torpedo Moscow	Voronezh
19:00 MSK (UTC+4)	Biryukov 82'	Summary	Katsalapov 39'; Salugin 100'	Stadium: Tsentralnyi Profsoyuz Stadion; Attendance: 19,800; Referee: Ivan Saraev

29 October 2014 Round of 16	CSKA Moscow	2–0	Torpedo Moscow	Podolsk
13:30 MSK (UTC+3)	Bazelyuk 13'; Dzagoev 39'	Summary		Stadium: Trud Stadium; Attendance: 5,800; Referee: Vladislav Bezborodov

== Squad statistics ==
As of match played 30 May 2015

=== Appearances and goals ===
No.	Pos	Nat	Player	Total		Premier League		Russian Cup	
No.	Pos	Nat	Player	Apps	Goals	Apps	Goals	Apps	Goals
4	FW	(Iceland) ISL	Arnór Smárason	11	2	3+8	2	0	0
5	DF	(Russia) RUS	Ivan Knyazev	1	0	0+1	0	0	0
6	DF	(Lithuania) LTU	Tomas Mikuckis	10	0	8+2	0	0	0
7	MF	(Russia) RUS	Semyon Fomin	17	1	7+8	1	1+1	0
9	DF	(Russia) RUS	Kirill Kombarov	25	3	23	3	2	0
10	FW	(Russia) RUS	Sergei Davydov	8	0	3+4	0	0+1	0
11	MF	(Russia) RUS	Reziuan Mirzov	27	1	20+6	1	1	0
13	GK	(Croatia) CRO	Goran Blažević	1	0	0	0	1	0
14	MF	(Belarus) BLR	Anton Putsila	19	4	17+2	4	0	0
15	DF	(Russia) RUS	Yegor Tarakanov	6	0	5	0	1	0
16	MF	(Slovenia) SLO	Dalibor Stevanović	28	3	26	3	1+1	0
17	DF	(Russia) RUS	Mikhail Bagayev	8	0	3+4	0	1	0
18	MF	(Russia) RUS	Aleksei Pugin	19	3	8+11	3	0	0
19	FW	(Estonia) EST	Sergei Zenjov	10	0	8+2	0	0	0
20	MF	(Russia) RUS	Vadim Steklov	23	0	20+1	0	1+1	0
22	FW	(Russia) RUS	Konstantin Bazelyuk	1	0	0+1	0	0	0
23	MF	(Russia) RUS	Diniyar Bilyaletdinov	19	2	14+3	2	2	0
27	FW	(Portugal) POR	Hugo Vieira	22	3	14+6	3	2	0
30	GK	(Belarus) BLR	Yuri Zhevnov	30	0	29	0	1	0
33	DF	(Russia) RUS	Vladimir Rykov	30	2	28	2	2	0
34	DF	(Russia) RUS	Aleksandr Katsalapov	22	2	18+2	1	2	1
71	DF	(Russia) RUS	Georgi Tigiyev	5	0	4+1	0	0	0
77	FW	(Russia) RUS	Aleksandr Salugin	19	2	10+8	1	0+1	1
98	GK	(Russia) RUS	Aleksandr Budakov	1	0	1	0	0	0
Players away from the club on loan:
Players who appeared for Torpedo Moscow no longer at the club:
2	DF	(Slovakia) SVK	Lukáš Tesák	6	0	6	0	0	0
3	DF	(Poland) POL	Adam Kokoszka	24	0	20+2	0	2	0
4	DF	(Russia) RUS	Dmitry Aydov	4	1	4	1	0	0
8	DF	(Australia) AUS	Ivan Franjic	5	0	3+1	0	1	0
25	DF	(Russia) RUS	Ivan Novoseltsev	16	0	12+3	0	0+1	0
40	MF	(Russia) RUS	Yuri Kuleshov	4	0	2+2	0	0	0
88	FW	(Russia) RUS	Igor Shevchenko	15	0	13+1	0	1	0

=== Goal scorers ===
Place	Position	Nation	Number	Name	Premier League	Russian Cup	Total
1	MF	(Belarus)	14	Anton Putsila	4	0	4
2	DF	(Russia)	9	Kirill Kombarov	3	0	3
2	FW	(Portugal)	27	Hugo Vieira	3	0	3
2	MF	(Slovenia)	16	Dalibor Stevanović	3	0	3
2	MF	(Russia)	18	Aleksei Pugin	3	0	3
6	MF	(Russia)	23	Diniyar Bilyaletdinov	2	0	2
6	FW	(Iceland)	4	Arnór Smárason	2	0	2
6	DF	(Russia)	33	Vladimir Rykov	2	0	2
6	DF	(Russia)	34	Aleksandr Katsalapov	1	1	2
6	FW	(Russia)	77	Aleksandr Salugin	1	1	2
11	MF	(Russia)	7	Semyon Fomin	1	0	1
11	DF	(Russia)	4	Dmitry Aydov	1	0	1
11	MF	(Russia)	11	Reziuan Mirzov	1	0	1
11				Own goal	1	0	1
				TOTALS	28	2	30

=== Clean sheets ===
Place	Position	Nation	Number	Name	Premier League	Russian Cup	Total
1	GK	(Belarus)	30	Yuri Zhevnov	7	0	7
				TOTALS	7	0	7

=== Disciplinary record ===
Number	Nation	Position	Name	Premier League		Russian Cup		Total	
Number	Nation	Position	Name	Yellow card	Red card	Yellow card	Red card	Yellow card	Red card
3	(Poland)	DF	Adam Kokoszka	5	0	1	0	6	0
4	(Russia)	DF	Dmitry Aydov	2	0	0	0	2	0
6	(Lithuania)	DF	Tomas Mikuckis	4	0	0	0	4	0
7	(Russia)	MF	Semyon Fomin	4	0	0	0	4	0
8	(Australia)	DF	Ivan Franjic	1	0	0	0	1	0
9	(Russia)	DF	Kirill Kombarov	4	0	0	0	4	0
11	(Russia)	MF	Reziuan Mirzov	2	0	0	0	2	0
14	(Belarus)	MF	Anton Putsila	3	0	0	0	3	0
15	(Russia)	DF	Yegor Tarakanov	2	0	0	0	2	0
16	(Slovenia)	MF	Dalibor Stevanović	6	0	0	0	6	0
19	(Estonia)	FW	Sergei Zenjov	1	0	0	0	1	0
20	(Russia)	MF	Vadim Steklov	5	0	0	0	5	0
23	(Russia)	MF	Diniyar Bilyaletdinov	3	1	0	0	3	1
25	(Russia)	DF	Ivan Novoseltsev	1	0	0	0	1	0
27	(Portugal)	FW	Hugo Vieira	2	0	0	0	2	0
30	(Belarus)	GK	Yuri Zhevnov	1	0	0	0	1	0
33	(Russia)	DF	Vladimir Rykov	7	2	1	0	8	2
34	(Russia)	DF	Aleksandr Katsalapov	6	0	0	0	6	0
77	(Russia)	FW	Aleksandr Salugin	3	0	0	0	3	0
88	(Russia)	FW	Igor Shevchenko	2	0	0	0	2	0
			TOTALS	64	3	2	0	66	3

== Notes ==
- MSK time changed from UTC+4 to UTC+3 permanently on 26 October 2014.
