= List of Latvian football transfers summer 2018 =

This is a list of Latvian football transfers in the 2018 summer transfer window by club. Only transfers of the Virslīga are included.

All transfers mentioned are shown in the references at the bottom of the page. If you wish to insert a transfer that isn't mentioned there, please add a reference.

== Latvian Higher League ==
=== Spartaks ===
In: Note: Flags indicate national team as defined under FIFA eligibility rules; some limited exceptions apply. Players may hold more than one non-FIFA nationality.

No.	Pos.	Nation	Player
—	GK	LVA	Mārcis Melecis (from Jelgava)
—	DF	MDA	Ioan-Călin Revenco (from (Moldova) Dacia Chișinău)
—	DF	LTU	Tomas Mikuckis (from (Russia) Tom Tomsk)
—	MF	BRA	Vitor Faíska (from (Brazil) Boavista)
—	FW	ARG	Diego Ezequiel Aguirre (from (Ukraine) Arsenal Kyiv)
—	FW	RUS	Denis Davydov (on loan from (Russia) Spartak Moscow)
—	FW	RUS	Aleksandr Prudnikov (from (Russia) Anzhi Makhachkala)

Out: Note: Flags indicate national team as defined under FIFA eligibility rules; some limited exceptions apply. Players may hold more than one non-FIFA nationality.

No.	Pos.	Nation	Player
2	MF	SRB	Nikola Kovačević (to (Serbia) Radnik Surdulica)
3	FW	LVA	Rolands Vagančuks (to Valmiera)
11	MF	LVA	Jurijs Žigajevs (retired)
14	MF	RUS	Oleg Dmitriyev (loan return to (Russia) Baltika Kaliningrad)
16	MF	RUS	Gadzhi Adzhiyev (released)
18	MF	HON	Jonathan Moncada (released)
21	FW	SRB	Marko Simić (to (Serbia) FK Bežanija)
22	DF	BRA	Gabriel Mello (loan return to (Brazil) São Bernardo)
25	DF	LVA	Mārcis Ošs (on loan to (Switzerland) Neuchâtel Xamax)

=== Liepāja ===
In: Note: Flags indicate national team as defined under FIFA eligibility rules; some limited exceptions apply. Players may hold more than one non-FIFA nationality.

No.	Pos.	Nation	Player
—	GK	ARM	Arsen Beglaryan (from (Armenia) FC Alashkert)
—	DF	SEN	Sady Gueye (from Jelgava)
—	DF	SEN	Khassim Soumare (from (Senegal) Diambars FC)
—	MF	LVA	Jānis Ikaunieks (from (France) FC Metz, previously on loan)
—	MF	LVA	Vladimirs Kamešs (from (Russia) Yenisey Krasnoyarsk)
—	MF	LVA	Jānis Krautmanis (from RTU FC)
—	MF	NGA	Benjamin Teidi (from (Georgia (country)) Merani Martvili)
—	FW	LVA	Ēriks Punculs (from Riga FC)
—	FW	SEN	Dame Gueye (on loan from (Senegal) Diambars FC)

Out: Note: Flags indicate national team as defined under FIFA eligibility rules; some limited exceptions apply. Players may hold more than one non-FIFA nationality.

No.	Pos.	Nation	Player
11	FW	LVA	Artūrs Karašausks (to (Kazakhstan) FC Akzhayik)
15	FW	LVA	Dēvids Dobrecovs (on loan to RTU FC)

=== Riga FC ===
In: Note: Flags indicate national team as defined under FIFA eligibility rules; some limited exceptions apply. Players may hold more than one non-FIFA nationality.

No.	Pos.	Nation	Player
—	DF	LVA	Vladislavs Gabovs (from (Cyprus) Pafos FC)
—	DF	LVA	Ņikita Sklarenko (from (Germany) Grün-Weiss Deggendorf)
—	DF	LVA	Mihails Ļesnojs (from Dinamo Rīga)
—	DF	LVA	Jurijs Georgs Rusakovs (from RTU FC)
—	MF	LVA	Ivans Lukjanovs (from (Russia) Fakel Voronezh)
—	MF	BRA	Thiago Primão (from (Brazil) Londrina)
—	MF	CRO	Tomislav Šarić (from (Croatia) Inter Zaprešić)
—	MF	VEN	Pedro Antonio Ramirez (from (Venezuela) Deportivo Lara)
—	MF	SRB	Stefan Panić (from (Serbia) Javor Ivanjica)
—	MF	BRA	Felipe Brisola (from (Bulgaria) Botev Plovdiv)
—	FW	LVA	Deniss Rakels (on loan from (Cyprus) Pafos FC)
—	FW	GUI	Alhassane Traoré (from (France) Olympique Grande-Synthe)
—	FW	POL	Kamil Biliński (from (Poland) Wisła Płock)

Out: Note: Flags indicate national team as defined under FIFA eligibility rules; some limited exceptions apply. Players may hold more than one non-FIFA nationality.

No.	Pos.	Nation	Player
6	MF	EST	Bogdan Vaštšuk (on loan to (Bulgaria) Levski Sofia)
8	FW	UKR	Serhiy Zahynaylov (to (Ukraine) PFC Sumy)
17	DF	LVA	Viktors Litvinskis (to Jelgava)
18	FW	LVA	Ēriks Punculs (to Liepāja)
25	MF	UKR	Valeriy Fedorchuk (to (Ukraine) FC Mariupol)
30	DF	LVA	Ņikita Sklarenko (on loan to (Cyprus) Pafos FC)
72	DF	SRB	Mario Maslać (released)
77	MF	MNE	Milan Vušurović (to (Bulgaria) FC Vereya)
99	MF	LVA	Kristers Čudars (on loan to (Cyprus) Pafos FC)

=== Ventspils ===
In: Note: Flags indicate national team as defined under FIFA eligibility rules; some limited exceptions apply. Players may hold more than one non-FIFA nationality.

No.	Pos.	Nation	Player
—	DF	BRA	Hélio Monteiro Batista (from (Romania) Gaz Metan Mediaș)
—	DF	MKD	Medjit Neziri (from (North Macedonia) FK Renova)
—	DF	LVA	Vitālijs Jagodinskis (from (Romania) Politehnica Iași)
—	MF	UKR	Giuli Mandzhgaladze (from (Azerbaijan) Kapaz PFK)
—	MF	UKR	Artem Filimonov (from (Belarus) FC Gomel)
—	MF	POR	Pedro Mendes (from (Romania) Politehnica Iași)
—	MF	LVA	Anastasijs Mordatenko (from (Norway) Leknes Fotballklubb)
—	MF	TOG	Dové Womé (from (Togo) Gomido FC)
—	FW	RUS	Vasili Pavlov (from (Russia) Zorky Krasnogorsk)
—	FW	RUS	Kirill Burykin (from (Russia) Dynamo Moscow)

Out: Note: Flags indicate national team as defined under FIFA eligibility rules; some limited exceptions apply. Players may hold more than one non-FIFA nationality.

No.	Pos.	Nation	Player
9	FW	UKR	Oleksiy Antonov (released)
17	FW	NGA	Adeleke Akinyemi (to (Norway) IK Start)
20	MF	MDA	Maxim Cojocaru (to (Moldova) Petrocub Hîncești)
22	FW	RUS	Aleksei Alekseyev (to (Russia) Zorky Krasnogorsk)

=== RFS ===
In: Note: Flags indicate national team as defined under FIFA eligibility rules; some limited exceptions apply. Players may hold more than one non-FIFA nationality.

No.	Pos.	Nation	Player
—	DF	GEO	Nika Sandokhadze (on loan from (Ukraine) Karpaty Lviv)
—	DF	LVA	Iļja Savčenko (from RTU FC)
—	MF	BRA	Elivelto (from (Israel) Maccabi Petah Tikva)
—	FW	GEO	Irakli Sikharulidze (from (Czech Republic) 1. FC Slovácko)

Out: Note: Flags indicate national team as defined under FIFA eligibility rules; some limited exceptions apply. Players may hold more than one non-FIFA nationality.

No.	Pos.	Nation	Player
9	FW	LVA	Roberts Uldriķis (to (Switzerland) FC Sion)
23	MF	LVA	Kristaps Liepa (to METTA/LU)
28	MF	LVA	Daniils Ulimbaševs (on loan to Jelgava)
88	MF	LVA	Aleksandrs Cauņa (retired)
-	MF	LVA	Daniils Hvoiņickis (to Jelgava, previously on loan at SK Super Nova)

=== Jelgava ===
In: Note: Flags indicate national team as defined under FIFA eligibility rules; some limited exceptions apply. Players may hold more than one non-FIFA nationality.

No.	Pos.	Nation	Player
—	GK	LVA	Vladislavs Kurakins (from (Austria) Karabakh Wien)
—	DF	LVA	Viktors Litvinskis (from Riga FC)
—	DF	RUS	Naim Sharifi (from (Russia) Fakel Voronezh)
—	MF	LVA	Daniils Ulimbaševs (on loan from RFS)
—	MF	LVA	Daniils Hvoiņickis (from RFS)
—	MF	GEO	Guram Lukava (from (Georgia (country)) Kakheti Telavi)
—	MF	LVA	Artjoms Vorobjovs (from SK Super Nova)
—	MF	CUW	Yaël Eisden (from (Netherlands) RKC Waalwijk)

Out: Note: Flags indicate national team as defined under FIFA eligibility rules; some limited exceptions apply. Players may hold more than one non-FIFA nationality.

No.	Pos.	Nation	Player
4	DF	SEN	Sady Gueye (to Liepāja)
9	MF	LVA	Edgars Jermolajevs (to RTU FC)
15	DF	LVA	Oskars Deaks (to SK Supernova)
22	FW	RUS	Aleksandr Nekrasov (loan return to (Russia) Zenit Saint Petersburg)
24	GK	LVA	Mārcis Melecis (to Spartaks)

=== METTA/LU ===
In: Note: Flags indicate national team as defined under FIFA eligibility rules; some limited exceptions apply. Players may hold more than one non-FIFA nationality.

No.	Pos.	Nation	Player
—	DF	NGA	Lukman Zakari (from (Nigeria) Unity Football Academy Kaduna)
—	MF	LVA	Kristaps Liepa (from RFS)
—	FW	LBR	Van Dave Harmon (from (Liberia) Barrack Young Controllers)
—	FW	LBR	Sunnyboy Sandi Dolo (from (Liberia) Nimba Kwado)

Out: Note: Flags indicate national team as defined under FIFA eligibility rules; some limited exceptions apply. Players may hold more than one non-FIFA nationality.

No.	Pos.	Nation	Player
14	MF	LVA	Ņikita Pačko (to RTU FC)

=== Valmiera ===
In: Note: Flags indicate national team as defined under FIFA eligibility rules; some limited exceptions apply. Players may hold more than one non-FIFA nationality.

No.	Pos.	Nation	Player
—	DF	LVA	Niks Rubezis (from Grobiņas SC)
—	DF	CRO	Ante Bakmaz (from (Lithuania) Kauno Žalgiris)
—	DF	SWE	Camron Nguesseu (from (Spain) CF Reddis)
—	MF	SWE	Ricardo Gray (from (Sweden) Sundbybergs IK)
—	FW	LVA	Rolands Vagančuks (from Spartaks)
—	FW	NED	Rashid Browne (from (Netherlands) Excelsior Maassluis)

Out: Note: Flags indicate national team as defined under FIFA eligibility rules; some limited exceptions apply. Players may hold more than one non-FIFA nationality.

No.	Pos.	Nation	Player
5	DF	SEN	Massamba Sambou (released)
6	MF	COD	Thierry Mukuta (released)
21	DF	MDA	Alexandru Belevschi (released)
24	DF	RUS	Ivan Knyazev (released)
