= 2014–15 PFC CSKA Moscow season =

CSKA
2014–15 season
- Chairman: Yevgeni Giner
- Manager: Leonid Slutsky
- Stadium: Arena Khimki
- Premier League: 2nd
- Russian Cup: Semi-finals
- Super Cup: Winners
- Champions League: Group stage
- Top goalscorer: League: Roman Eremenko (13); All: Bibras Natcho (14)
- Highest home attendance: 23,000 vs Lokomotiv Moscow (21 September 2014)
- Lowest home attendance: 0 vs Bayern Munich (30 September 2014) vs Manchester City (21 October 2014) vs Roma (25 November 2014)
- Average home league attendance: 7,225 (25 May 2015)
Home colours	Away colours

In 2014–15, PFC CSKA Moscow played their 23rd successive season in the Russian Premier League, the highest tier of association football in Russia. CSKA finished the season in second place, failing to defend their 2012–13 title, were knocked out of the Russian Cup by Kuban Krasnodar in the Semifinals, the Champions League at the group stage and won the Russian Super Cup against FC Rostov.

== Season events ==
On 27 August, CSKA announced that Dzagoev had signed a new contract until the summer of 2019.

== Squad ==
As of match played 30 May 2015

Number	Name	Nationality	Position	Date of birth (age)	Signed from	Signed in	Contract ends	Apps.	Goals
Goalkeepers
1	Sergei Chepchugov	(Russia)	GK	15 July 1985 (aged 29)	Sibir Novosibirsk	2010		24	0
16	Sergei Revyakin	(Russia)	GK	2 April 1995 (aged 20)	Academy	2008		2	0
35	Igor Akinfeev (captain)	(Russia)	GK	8 April 1986 (aged 29)	Academy	2003	2019	441	0
38	Ivan Zlobin	(Russia)	GK	7 March 1997 (aged 18)	Konoplyov Academy	2013		0	0
41	Pavel Maiorov	(Russia)	GK	16 September 1997 (aged 17)	Academy	2014		0	0
45	Ilya Pomazun	(Russia)	GK	16 August 1996 (aged 18)	Academy	2012		0	0
Defenders
2	Mário Fernandes	(Brazil)	DF	19 September 1990 (aged 24)	Grêmio	2012	2017	87	1
4	Sergei Ignashevich	(Russia)	DF	14 July 1979 (aged 35)	Lokomotiv Moscow	2004		437	35
6	Aleksei Berezutski	(Russia)	DF	20 June 1982 (aged 32)	Chernomorets Novorossiysk	2001		413	8
14	Kirill Nababkin	(Russia)	DF	8 September 1986 (aged 28)	Moscow	2010		140	1
24	Vasili Berezutski	(Russia)	DF	20 June 1982 (aged 32)	Torpedo-ZIL	2002		435	12
37	Denis Masyutin	(Russia)	DF	9 July 1995 (aged 19)	Academy	2012		0	0
42	Georgi Shchennikov	(Russia)	DF	27 April 1991 (aged 24)	Academy	2008		193	1
47	Pavel Kotov	(Russia)	DF	21 June 1995 (aged 19)	Academy	2013		1	0
51	Anatolie Nikolaesh	(Russia)	DF	17 April 1996 (aged 19)	Academy	2014		0	0
62	Denis Nikitin	(Russia)	DF	5 May 1997 (aged 18)	Academy	2014		0	0
63	Yegor Matunov	(Russia)	DF	24 May 1997 (aged 18)	Academy	2014		0	0
64	Mutalip Alibekov	(Russia)	DF	18 June 1997 (aged 17)	Academy	2014		0	0
91	Nikita Chernov	(Russia)	DF	14 January 1996 (aged 19)	Academy	2014		2	0
Midfielder
3	Pontus Wernbloom	(Sweden)	MF	25 June 1986 (aged 28)	AZ Alkmaar	2012	2016	113	9
7	Zoran Tošić	(Serbia)	MF	28 April 1987 (aged 28)	Manchester United	2010	2015	173	40
10	Alan Dzagoev	(Russia)	MF	17 June 1990 (aged 24)	Krylia Sovetov-SOK Dimitrovgrad	2008		233	54
15	Dmitry Yefremov	(Russia)	MF	5 February 1994 (aged 21)	Akademiya Tolyatti	2012		33	0
19	Aleksandrs Cauņa	(Latvia)	MF	19 January 1988 (aged 27)	Skonto Riga	2011	2016	70	5
23	Georgi Milanov	(Bulgaria)	MF	19 January 1992 (aged 23)	Litex Lovech	2013	2018	70	3
25	Roman Eremenko	(Finland)	MF	19 March 1987 (aged 28)	Rubin Kazan	2013		33	13
26	Sekou Oliseh	(Liberia)	MF	5 June 1990 (aged 24)	Midtjylland	2010	2015	78	5
49	Nikita Titov	(Russia)	MF	14 March 1996 (aged 19)	Academy	2014		0	0
52	Igor Drykov	(Russia)	MF	23 February 1997 (aged 18)	Academy	2014		0	0
60	Aleksandr Golovin	(Russia)	MF	30 May 1996 (aged 19)	Academy	2014		10	0
66	Bibras Natcho	(Israel)	MF	18 February 1988 (aged 27)	Rubin Kazan	2013		34	13
67	Denis Glukhov	(Russia)	MF	5 January 1997 (aged 18)	Academy	2014		0	0
72	Astemir Gordyushenko	(Russia)	MF	30 March 1997 (aged 18)	Academy	2014		0	0
73	Dmitri Sokolov	(Russia)	MF	9 January 1997 (aged 18)	Academy	2014		0	0
85	Gaël Ondoua	(Cameroon)	MF	4 November 1995 (aged 19)	Lokomotiv Moscow	2014		1	0
86	Elgyun Ulukhanov	(Russia)	MF	2 April 1997 (aged 18)	Academy	2014		0	0
98	Svyatoslav Georgiyevsky	(Russia)	MF	26 August 1995 (aged 19)	Academy	2014		1	0
Forwards
8	Kirill Panchenko	(Russia)	FW	16 October 1989 (aged 25)	Tom Tomsk	2014	2019	19	1
17	Alibek Aliev	(Sweden)	FW	16 August 1996 (aged 18)	IF Elfsborg	2015	2020	0	0
18	Ahmed Musa	(Nigeria)	FW	13 August 1989 (aged 25)	VVV-Venlo	2012	2017	124	36
43	Aleksandr Makarov	(Russia)	FW	24 April 1996 (aged 19)	Academy	2014		0	0
46	Nikolai Dergachyov	(Russia)	FW	24 May 1994 (aged 21)	Saturn-2	2012		1	0
65	Mikhail Solovyov	(Russia)	FW	7 April 1997 (aged 18)	Academy	2014		0	0
68	Nikita Kasatkin	(Russia)	FW	16 February 1997 (aged 18)	Academy	2014		0	0
74	Savva Knyazev	(Russia)	FW	9 September 1997 (aged 17)	Academy	2014		0	0
75	Timur Zhamaletdinov	(Russia)	FW	21 May 1997 (aged 18)	Academy	2014		0	0
96	Vadim Larionov	(Russia)	FW	22 October 1996 (aged 18)	UOR Leninsk-Kuznetsky	2014		0	0
97	Carlos Strandberg	(Sweden)	FW	14 April 1996 (aged 19)	BK Häcken	2015	2020	11	3
Away on loan
5	Viktor Vasin	(Russia)	DF	6 October 1988 (aged 26)	Spartak Nalchik	2011		8	0
11	Vitinho	(Brazil)	FW	21 October 1994 (aged 20)	Botafogo	2013	2018	24	1
39	Vyacheslav Karavayev	(Russia)	DF	20 May 1995 (aged 20)	Academy	2011		4	0
70	Armen Ambartsumyan	(Russia)	MF	11 April 1994 (aged 21)	Academy	2010		1	0
71	Konstantin Bazelyuk	(Russia)	FW	12 April 1993 (aged 22)	Academy	2010		27	4
92	Pyotr Ten	(Russia)	DF	12 July 1992 (aged 22)	Academy	2010		1	0
Players that left during the season
8	Steven Zuber	(Switzerland)	MF	17 August 1991 (aged 23)	Grasshoppers	2013	2018	40	1
11	Mark González	(Chile)	MF	10 July 1984 (aged 29)	Real Betis	2009	2014	68	9
20	Rasmus Elm	(Sweden)	MF	17 March 1988 (aged 27)	AZ Alkmaar	2012	2015	60	5
88	Seydou Doumbia	(Ivory Coast)	FW	31 December 1987 (aged 27)	Young Boys	2010	2015	129	84

== Transfers ==
=== In ===
Date	Position	Nationality	Name	From	Fee	Ref.
11 July 2014	FW	(Russia)	Kirill Panchenko	Tom Tomsk	Undisclosed	
9 August 2014	MF	(Israel)	Bibras Natcho	Rubin Kazan	Undisclosed	
25 August 2014	MF	(Finland)	Roman Eremenko	Rubin Kazan	Undisclosed	
22 January 2015	FW	(Sweden)	Alibek Aliev	IF Elfsborg	Undisclosed	
2 February 2015	FW	(Sweden)	Carlos Strandberg	BK Häcken	Undisclosed	

=== Out ===
Date	Position	Nationality	Name	To	Fee	Ref.
19 June 2014	MF	(Russia)	Yegor Ivanov	Yenisey Krasnoyarsk	Undisclosed	
14 August 2014	MF	(Switzerland)	Steven Zuber	Hoffenheim	Undisclosed	
18 August 2014	DF	(Russia)	Yuri Bavin	Leiria	Undisclosed	
18 August 2014	DF	(Russia)	Dmitri Litvinov	Torpedo Moscow	Undisclosed	
22 August 2014	DF	(Russia)	Anton Polyutkin	Solyaris Moscow	Undisclosed	
22 August 2014	MF	(Russia)	Ravil Netfullin	Solyaris Moscow	Undisclosed	
22 August 2014	MF	(Russia)	David Khurtsidze	Ulisses	Undisclosed	
31 January 2015	FW	(Ivory Coast)	Seydou Doumbia	A.S. Roma	Undisclosed	

=== Loans out ===
Date from	Position	Nationality	Name	To	Date to	Ref.
11 June 2014	DF	(Russia)	Pyotr Ten	Anzhi Makhachkala	End of Season	
26 June 2014	DF	(Russia)	Vyacheslav Karavayev	Dukla Prague	End of Season	
3 July 2014	MF	(Chile)	Mark González	CD Universidad Católica	31 December 2014	
11 July 2014	MF	(Liberia)	Sekou Oliseh	Kuban Krasnodar	15 December 2014	
14 July 2014	DF	(Russia)	Viktor Vasin	Mordovia Saransk	End of Season	
15 August 2014	FW	(Czech Republic)	Tomáš Necid	PEC Zwolle	31 December 2014	
Summer 2014	MF	(Russia)	Armen Ambartsumyan	Zenit Penza	End of Season	
12 January 2015	FW	(Russia)	Konstantin Bazelyuk	Torpedo Moscow	End of Season	
16 January 2015	MF	(Brazil)	Vitinho	Internacional	End of Season	

=== Released ===
Date	Position	Nationality	Name	Joined	Date
24 December 2014	MF	(Chile)	Mark González	CD Universidad Católica	
3 January 2015	MF	(Sweden)	Rasmus Elm	Kalmar	20 January 2015
3 February 2015	FW	(Czech Republic)	Tomáš Necid	PEC Zwolle	2 February 2015
April 2015	MF	(Russia)	Igor Drykov		
30 June 2015	GK	(Russia)	Ivan Zlobin	U.D. Leiria	
30 June 2015	DF	(Russia)	Pavel Kotov	Neftekhimik Nizhnekamsk	
30 June 2015	DF	(Russia)	Danil Neplyuyev		
30 June 2015	DF	(Russia)	Andrei Sorokin	Sakhalin Yuzhno-Sakhalinsk	
30 June 2015	MF	(Cameroon)	Gaël Ondoua	VB	
30 June 2015	MF	(Liberia)	Sekou Oliseh	Al-Gharafa	
30 June 2015	FW	(Russia)	Alan Koroyev	Krasnodar	
30 June 2015	FW	(Russia)	Dmitri Zhuravlyov		

== Friendlies ==
2 July 2014	CSKA Moscow	3–0	FC Khimki	Russia
14:00 MSK (UTC+4)	Vitinho 33', 77'; Yefremov 87'	Summary

5 July 2014	CSKA Moscow	1–2	Torpedo Moscow	Russia
14:00 MSK (UTC+4)	Milanov 50' (pen.)	Summary	Fomin 65'; Shevchenko 90'

8 July 2014	CSKA Moscow	1–1	Ufa	Russia
17:00 MSK (UTC+4)	Wernbloom 10'	Summary	Galiullin 80'	Referee: C. Kuznetsov

13 July 2014	CSKA Moscow	2–0	Mordovia Saransk	Moscow, Russia
MSK (UTC+4)	Doumbia 53' (pen.); Nababkin 61'	Summary		Referee: T. Arslanbekov

17 July 2014	CSKA Moscow	7–1	Dynamo Barnaul	Moscow, Russia
MSK (UTC+4)	Doumbia 6', 14', 44'; Doumbia 22', 27'; Zuber 47'; Yefremov 52'	Summary	Zavyalov 60'

20 July 2014	CSKA Moscow	4–0	(Serbia) OFK Beograd	Moscow, Russia
MSK (UTC+4)	Doumbia 1', 52', 68'; Milanov 47'	Summary

9 September 2014	CSKA Moscow	1–2	Anzhi Makhachkala	Moscow
MSK (UTC+4)	Natcho 89'	Summary	Abdulavov 68'; Komkov 90'	Referee: Denis Zabotin

21 January 2015	CSKA Moscow (Russia)	1–0	(Switzerland) Sion	San Pedro del Pinatar, Spain
14:00 MSK (UTC+4)	Wernbloom (yellow card) 42'; Eremenko 74'	Summary		Stadium: Pinatar Arena

22 January 2015	CSKA Moscow (Russia)	2–0	(Germany) FSV Frankfurt	San Pedro del Pinatar, Spain
13:00 MSK (UTC+4)	A.Makarov 38'; Wernbloom (yellow card) 70'; Panchenko 78'	Summary		Stadium: Pinatar Arena

22 January 2015	CSKA Moscow (Russia)	2–1	(China) Shanghai Greenland Shenhua	San Pedro del Pinatar, Spain
13:00 MSK (UTC+4)	Tošić 75'; Panchenko 90'	Summary	Zheng 24'	Stadium: Pinatar Arena

4 February 2015	CSKA Moscow (Russia)	4–2	(Denmark) AaB	San Pedro del Pinatar, Spain
20:00 MSK (UTC+4)	Wernbloom (yellow card) 5'; Natcho 11' (pen.); Musa 18', 79'; Dzagoev 31'; Strandberg (yellow card) 50'	Summary	Helenius 34', 75'	Stadium: Pinatar Arena

7 February 2015	CSKA Moscow	1–2	Torpedo Moscow	San Pedro del Pinatar, Spain
18:00 MSK (UTC+4)	Musa 31'; Wernbloom (yellow card) 64'; Gapon (yellow card) 70'	Summary	Steklov 22'; Bilyaletdinov 62'	Stadium: Pinatar Arena

10 February 2015	CSKA Moscow (Russia)	3–0	(China) Tianjin Teda	San Pedro del Pinatar, Spain
14:00 MSK (UTC+4)	Strandberg 58'; Panchenko 82'; Wernbloom 87'	Summary		Stadium: Pinatar Arena

17 February 2015	CSKA Moscow (Russia)	1–0	(Hungary) Videoton	Marbella, Spain
18:00 MSK (UTC+4)	Yefremov 2'; Wernbloom (yellow card) 83'	Summary		Stadium: Marbella Football Center

19 February 2015	CSKA Moscow (Russia)	0–0	(Spain) Granada	Marbella, Spain
19:00 MSK (UTC+4)	Natcho (yellow card) 37'	Summary		Stadium: Marbella Football Center

25 February 2015	CSKA Moscow (Russia)	1–0	(Spain) Málaga	Marbella, Spain
18:00 MSK (UTC+4)	Dzagoev 29'	Summary		Stadium: Marbella Football Center

== Competitions ==
=== Super Cup ===
26 July 2013	CSKA Moscow	3 – 1	Rostov	Krasnodar
21:30 MSK (UTC+4)	Wernbloom (yellow card) 45' (goal) 56'; Tošić 74'; Ignashevich (yellow card) 87'; Doumbia 90'	Report	Kalachev (yellow card) 20'; Milić 37'; Gațcan (yellow card) 53' (yellow-red card) 61'; Kanga (yellow card) 62' (yellow-red card) 63'	Stadium: Kuban Stadium; Attendance: 6,400; Referee: Aleksei Nikolaev

=== Premier League ===
==== Results by round ====
Round	1	2	3	4	5	6	7	8	9	10	11	12	13	14	15	16	17	18	19	20	21	22	23	24	25	26	27	28	29	30
Ground	H	A	H	H	A	H	H	H	A	H	A	H	A	A	H	H	A	A	H	A	A	H	A	H	A	H	A	A	H	A
Result	W	W	W	L	L	W	W	W	W	W	D	L	L	L	W	W	W	W	W	W	L	L	L	D	W	W	W	W	W	D
Position	5	3	2	4	7	6	4	3	2	2	2	2	2	4	3	2	2	2	2	2	2	3	3	3	3	3	3	2	2	2

Updated to match(es) played on 31 May 2015. Source: Russian Premier League
A = Away; H = Home; W = Win; D = Draw; L = Loss

==== Matches ====
2 August 2014 1	CSKA Moscow	4 – 1	Torpedo Moscow	Khimki
21:30 MSK (UTC+4)	Doumbia 35' (pen.); Panchenko 45+1'; Aydov 49' (o.g.); Fernandes (yellow card) 75'; Vitinho 81'	Report	Fomin 5' (yellow card) 55'; Rykov (red card) 33'; Shevchenko (yellow card) 44'	Stadium: Arena Khimki; Attendance: 11,000; Referee: Igor Fedotov

9 August 2014 2	Mordovia Saransk	0 – 1	CSKA Moscow	Saransk
13:30 MSK (UTC+4)	Shitov (yellow card) 47'; Donald (yellow card) 61'	Report	Doumbia (yellow card) 26' (goal) 79' (pen.); Vitinho (yellow card) 46'; Wernbloom (yellow card) 56'	Stadium: Start Stadium; Attendance: 11,613; Referee: Sergey Lapochkin

13 August 2014 3	CSKA Moscow	1 – 0	Terek Grozny	Khimki
20:00 MSK (UTC+4)	Tošić 4'; Ignashevich (yellow card) 45+1'; Wernbloom (yellow card) 47'	Report	Utsiev (yellow card) 27'; Ivanov (yellow card) 37'; Semyonov (yellow card) 45'; Kudryashov (yellow card) 50'; Adilson (yellow card) 54'	Stadium: Arena Khimki; Attendance: 6,000; Referee: Aleksandr Egorov

17 August 2014 4	CSKA Moscow	0 – 1	Spartak Moscow	Khimki
13:30 MSK (UTC+4)	Wernbloom (yellow card) 5'; Berezutski (yellow card) 31'; Milanov (yellow card) 80'; Nababkin (yellow card) 90+3' (yellow-red card) 90+3'	Report	Tasci (yellow card) 32'; Insaurralde (yellow card) 43'; Makeev (yellow card) 55'; Källström (yellow card) 57'; Davydov (yellow card) 73'; Kombarov 61' (pen.); Parshivlyuk (yellow card) 87' (yellow-red card) 90+3'	Stadium: Arena Khimki; Attendance: 15,000; Referee: Vladislav Bezborodov

23 August 2014 5	Rubin Kazan'	2 – 1	CSKA Moscow	Kazan
20:00 MSK (UTC+4)	Portnyagin (yellow card) 15' (goal) 17'; Navas (yellow card) 44'; Karadeniz 83'	Report	Natcho 45' (pen.)	Stadium: Kazan Arena; Attendance: 34,622; Referee: Sergei Ivanov

31 August 2014 6	CSKA Moscow	6 – 0	Rostov	Khimki
13:30 MSK (UTC+4)	Eremenko (yellow card) 34' (goal) 65'; Natcho 42' (pen.), 54', 90+1'; Musa 52', 59'	Report	Torbinski (yellow card) 31'	Stadium: Arena Khimki; Attendance: 9,000; Referee: Sergey Lapochkin

13 September 2014 7	CSKA Moscow	2 – 1	Arsenal Tula	Khimki
13:30 MSK (UTC+4)	Natcho 20' (pen.); Eremenko 78'	Report	Zotov 50'; Ryzhkov (yellow card) 61'; Vasilyev (yellow card) 63'	Stadium: Arena Khimki; Attendance: Vitali Meshkov; Referee: 10,000

21 September 2014 8	CSKA Moscow	1 – 0	Lokomotiv Moscow	Khimki
13:30 MSK (UTC+4)	Doumbia (yellow card) 22'; Musa 33'; Eremenko (yellow card) 39'; Wernbloom (yellow card) 54'; Ignashevich (yellow card) 88'	Report	Denisov (yellow card) 86'	Stadium: Arena Khimki; Attendance: 23,000; Referee: Aleksei Nikolaev

27 September 2014 9	Ural	3 – 4	CSKA Moscow	Yekaterinburg
13:30 MSK (UTC+4)	Manucharyan 10'; Smolov 55'; Yerokhin 83'	Report	Dzagoev 29'; Eremenko 45+2'; Doumbia 69', 89'	Stadium: Central Stadium; Referee: Aleksandr Egorov

18 October 2014 10	CSKA Moscow	6 – 0	Kuban Krasnodar	Khimki
14:30 MSK (UTC+4)	Musa 13', 71'; Eremenko 18'; Armaș 70' (o.g.); Doumbia 85', 90'	Report	Tlisov (yellow card) 4'; Baldé (yellow card) 68'; Belenov (yellow card) 71'	Stadium: Arena Khimki; Attendance: 7,000; Referee: Igor Nizovtsev

26 October 2014 11	Ufa	3 – 3	CSKA Moscow	Perm
13:30 MSK (UTC+3)	Forbes 12' (yellow card) 90+3'; Paurević (yellow card) 35'; Semakin 50'; Safronidi 87'	Report	Berezutski 43'; Natcho 59' (pen.), 90+4' (pen.); Wernbloom (yellow card) 85'	Stadium: Zvezda Stadium; Attendance: 1,600; Referee: Sergei Ivanov

1 November 2014 12	CSKA Moscow	0 – 1	Zenit St.Petersburg	Khimki
16:00 MSK (UTC+3)	Wernbloom (yellow card) 23'; Schennikov (yellow card) 86'	Report	García 7'; Witsel (yellow card) 44'; Criscito (yellow card) 57'; Kerzhakov (yellow card) 72'	Stadium: Arena Khimki; Attendance: 13,500; Referee: Aleksandr Egorov

9 November 2014 13	Dynamo Moscow	1 – 0	CSKA Moscow	Khimki
13:30 MSK (UTC+3)	Kokorin 54'; Samba (yellow card) 65'; Yusupov (yellow card) 82'; Büttner (yellow card) 86'; Vainqueur (yellow card) 90+2'	Report	Fernandes (yellow card) 56'; Milanov (yellow card) 87'; Natcho (yellow card) 90+5'	Stadium: Arena Khimki; Attendance: 13,692; Referee: Igor Fedotov

22 November 2014 14	Krasnodar	2 – 1	CSKA Moscow	Krasnodar
16:30 MSK (UTC+3)	Ari 4', 6'; Izmailov (yellow card) 68'; Laborde (yellow card) 69'; Sigurðsson (yellow card) 89'	Report	Eremenko 14'	Stadium: Kuban Stadium; Attendance: 12,200; Referee: Sergey Lapochkin

29 November 2014 15	CSKA Moscow	5 – 0	Ufa	Khimki
15:45 MSK (UTC+3)	Schennikov (yellow card) 34'; Natcho 35'; Tošić 41', 56'; Doumbia 60'; Musa 88'	Report		Stadium: Arena Khimki; Attendance: 6,000; Referee: Vitali Meshkov

2 December 2014 16	CSKA Moscow	2 – 1	Amkar Perm'	Khimki
19:00 MSK (UTC+3)	Eremenko 78', 90+1'	Report	Takazov 15'; Ogude (yellow card) 59'; Tyukalov (yellow card) 78'; Nikitin (yellow card) 79'; Zanev (yellow card) 84'	Stadium: Arena Khimki; Attendance: 6,200; Referee: Sergei Ivanov

6 December 2014 17	Kuban Krasnodar	0 – 1	CSKA Moscow	Krasnodar
19:00 MSK (UTC+3)	Melgarejo (yellow card) 35'; Rabiu (yellow card) 60'; Khubulov (yellow card) 84'	Report	Musa 45'; Wernbloom (yellow card) 73'	Stadium: Kuban Stadium; Attendance: 4,000; Referee: Vladislav Bezborodov

7 March 2015 18	Terek Grozny	1 – 2	CSKA Moscow	Grozny
14:00 MSK (UTC+3)	Ivanov (yellow card) 41'; Lebedenko 61'; Kudryashov (yellow card) 67'; Bokila (yellow card) 82'	Report	Akinfeev (yellow card) 36'; Musa 45+3', 76'; Eremenko (yellow card) 90'	Stadium: Akhmat-Arena; Attendance: 8,900; Referee: Vitali Meshkov

14 March 2015 19	CSKA Moscow	4 – 0	Mordovia Saransk	Khimki
16:00 MSK (UTC+3)	Dzagoev 4'; Wernbloom (yellow card) 22'; Eremenko 33', 64'; Nababkin 79'	Report	Yakovlev (red card) 20'; Shitov (yellow card) 36'	Stadium: Arena Khimki; Attendance: 9,000; Referee: Vitaly Rushakov

21 March 2015 20	Arsenal Tula	1 – 4	CSKA Moscow	Moscow
14:15 MSK (UTC+3)	Nalyotov (yellow card) 46'; Timokhin 53'; Chibirov (yellow card) 73'; Sergeyev (yellow card) 83'	Report	Dzagoev 3'; Natcho 47'; Eremenko 82'; Strandberg 88'	Stadium: MSA Lokomotiv; Attendance: 1,300; Referee: Sergey Kulikov

5 April 2015 21	Zenit St.Petersburg	2 – 1	CSKA Moscow	Saint Petersburg
13:30 MSK (UTC+3)	Criscito (yellow card) 45+1'; Hulk 62', 73'	Report	Wernbloom (yellow card) 70'; Strandberg 81'	Stadium: Petrovsky Stadium; Attendance: 18,261; Referee: Sergei Ivanov

8 April 2015 22	CSKA Moscow	1 – 2	Dynamo Moscow	Khimki
20:30 MSK (UTC+3)	Milanov 15'; Wernbloom (yellow card) 54'	Report	Ionov 9'; Dzsudzsák 24'; Zhirkov (yellow card) 86'	Stadium: Arena Khimki; Attendance: 12,000; Referee: Sergei Karasev

13 April 2015 23	Amkar Perm'	1 – 0	CSKA Moscow	Perm
MSK (UTC+3)	Kireyev 59' (yellow card) 60'	Report		Stadium: Zvezda Stadium; Attendance: 8,900; Referee: Aleksandr Egorov

19 April 2015 24	CSKA Moscow	1 – 1	Krasnodar	Khimki
13:30 MSK (UTC+3)	Wernbloom (yellow card) 42' (goal) 44'; Nababkin (yellow card) 83'	Report	Mamayev (yellow card) 43'; Pereyra (yellow card) 68'; Ari (yellow card) 80'; Wánderson 88'	Stadium: Arena Khimki; Attendance: 10,000; Referee: Vladislav Bezborodov

25 April 2015 25	Torpedo Moscow	0 – 2	CSKA Moscow	Ramenskoye
17:00 MSK (UTC+3)	Stevanović (yellow card) 45+2'; Steklov (yellow card) 80'; Mikuckis (yellow card) 86'	Report	Schennikov (yellow card) 5'; Akinfeev (yellow card) 45+2'; Strandberg 50'; Natcho 69'	Stadium: Saturn Stadium; Attendance: 0 Referee: Aleksei Eskov

4 May 2015 26	CSKA Moscow	3 – 1	Ural	Khimki
18:00 MSK (UTC+3)	Natcho 17' (pen.); Wernbloom (yellow card) 61'; Milanov 62'; Dzagoev 63'	Report	Novikov (yellow card) 7'; Acevedo (yellow card) 57'; Markov (yellow card) 77'; Fontanello (yellow card) 84'; Sapeta 86'	Stadium: Arena Khimki; Attendance: 5,000; Referee: Vitali Meshkov

10 May 2015 27	Lokomotiv Moscow	1 – 3	CSKA Moscow	Moscow
13:30 MSK (UTC+3)	Niasse 38'; Yanbayev (yellow card) 67'	Report	Dzagoev 35'; Ignashevich (yellow card) 45'; Tošić (yellow card) 45+2' (goal) 56'; Fernandes (yellow card) 65'; Natcho 68' (pen.)	Stadium: Lokomotiv Stadium; Attendance: 14,870; Referee: Sergei Karasev

17 May 2015 28	Spartak Moscow	0 – 4	CSKA Moscow	Moscow
13:30 MSK (UTC+3)	Ebert (yellow card) 21'; Bryzgalov (yellow card) 51'; Glushakov (yellow card) 90'	Report	Eremenko 11', 22'; Tošić 30'; Musa 63'; Milanov (yellow card) 90+1'	Stadium: Otkrytie Arena; Attendance: 40,455; Referee: Aleksei Nikolaev

25 May 2015 29	CSKA Moscow	3 – 0	Rubin Kazan'	Khimki
20:45 MSK (UTC+3)	Tošić 43', 54'; Eremenko 59'; Wernbloom (yellow card) 70'	Report	Nabiullin (yellow card) 36'; Kuzmin (yellow card) 61'	Stadium: Arena Khimki; Attendance: 10,000; Referee: Sergey Lapochkin

30 May 2015 30	Rostov	1 – 1	CSKA Moscow	Rostov-on-Don
13:30 MSK (UTC+3)	Kanga (yellow card) 43'; Dyakov 45' (pen.); Pletikosa (yellow card) 87'	Report	Ignashevich (yellow card) 45'; Natcho (yellow card) 85'; Wernbloom 88'	Stadium: Olimp-2; Attendance: 15,500; Referee: Vitali Meshkov

==== League table ====
Pos	Team	Pld	W	D	L	GF	GA	GD	Pts	Qualification or relegation
1	Zenit St. Petersburg (C)	30	20	7	3	58	17	+41	67	Qualification for the Champions League group stage
2	CSKA Moscow	30	19	3	8	67	27	+40	60	Qualification for the Champions League third qualifying round
3	Krasnodar	30	17	9	4	52	27	+25	60	Qualification for the Europa League third qualifying round
4	Dynamo Moscow	30	14	8	8	53	36	+17	50	
5	Rubin Kazan	30	13	9	8	39	33	+6	48	Qualification for the Europa League third qualifying round

Source: Russian Premier League
Rules for classification: 1) points; 2) number of matches won; 3) head-to-head points; 4) head-to-head wins; 5) head-to-head goal difference; 6) head-to-head goals; 7) number of head-to-head away goals; 8) goal difference; 9) number of goals scored; 10) number of away goals scored
(C) Champions

=== Russian Cup ===
24 September 2014 Round of 32	Khimik Dzerzhinsk	1 – 2	CSKA Moscow	Dzerzhinsk
15:00 MSK (UTC+4)	G.Dzhikiya (yellow card) 26'; Stolbovoy 38'; Umarbaev (yellow card) 72'; Shustikov (yellow card) 89'	Report	Tagilov 67' (o.g.); Dzagoev 84'; Wernbloom (yellow card) 90'	Stadium: Khimik Stadium; Attendance: 4,800; Referee: Sergey Kulikov

29 October 2014 Round of 16	CSKA Moscow	2 – 0	Torpedo Moscow	Podolsk
13:30 MSK (UTC+3)	Bazelyuk 13'; Dzagoev 39'	Report		Stadium: Trud Stadium; Attendance: 5,800; Referee: Vladislav Bezborodov

2 March 2015 Quarterfinal	CSKA Moscow	1 – 0	Krylia Sovetov	Khimki
18:00 MSK (UTC+3)	Natcho 50'; Eremenko (yellow card) 64' (yellow-red card) 87'	Report	Jahović (yellow card) 85'	Stadium: Arena Khimki; Attendance: 4,000; Referee: Sergey Lapochkin

29 April 2015 Semifinal	Kuban Krasnodar	1 – 0	CSKA Moscow	Krasnodar
20:30 MSK (UTC+3)	Rabiu (yellow card) 53'; Ignatyev (yellow card) 65'; Almeida 71'; Tkachyov (yellow card) 77'; Bucur (yellow card) 90'	Report	Milanov (yellow card) 53'; Schennikov (yellow card) 73'	Stadium: Kuban Stadium; Attendance: 22,397; Referee: Sergei Ivanov

=== UEFA Champions League ===
==== Group stage ====
Pos	Team	Pld	W	D	L	GF	GA	GD	Pts	Qualification	BAY	MCI	ROM	CSKA
1	(Germany) Bayern Munich	6	5	0	1	16	4	+12	15	Advance to knockout phase	—	1–0	2–0	3–0
2	(England) Manchester City	6	2	2	2	9	8	+1	8	Advance to knockout phase	3–2	—	1–1	1–2
3	(Italy) Roma	6	1	2	3	8	14	−6	5	Transfer to Europa League	1–7	0–2	—	5–1
4	(Russia) CSKA Moscow	6	1	2	3	6	13	−7	5		0–1	2–2	1–1	—

Source: UEFA
Rules for classification: Group stage tiebreakers

17 September 2014 1	Roma (Italy)	5 – 1	(Russia) CSKA Moscow	Rome, Italy
22:45 MSK (UTC+4)	Iturbe 6'; Gervinho 10', 31'; Maicon 20' (yellow card) 71'; Ignashevich 50' (o.g.)	Report	Musa 82'	Stadium: Stadio Olimpico; Attendance: 40,888; Referee: David Fernández Borbalán (Spain)

30 September 2014 2	CSKA Moscow (Russia)	0 – 1	(Germany) Bayern Munich	Khimki, Russia
20:00 MSK (UTC+4)	Eremenko (yellow card) 45+1'	Report	Müller 22' (pen.); Lahm (yellow card) 40'; Benatia (yellow card) 68'	Stadium: Arena Khimki; Attendance: 0 Referee: William Collum (Scotland)
Note: Match played behind closed as a punishment by UEFA.

21 October 2014 3	CSKA Moscow (Russia)	2 – 2	(England) Manchester City	Khimki, Russia
20:00 MSK (UTC+4)	Doumbia 64'; Natcho 86' (pen.)	Report	Agüero 29'; Milner 38'; Fernando (yellow card) 57'	Stadium: Arena Khimki; Attendance: 0 Referee: Istvan Vad (Hungary)
Note: Match played behind closed as a punishment by UEFA, after incidents at the Roma v CSKA Moscow match on 17 September 2014.

5 November 2014 4	Manchester City (England)	1 – 2	(Russia) CSKA Moscow	Manchester, England
23:45 MSK (UTC+4)	Y. Touré 8' (yellow card) 66' (red card) 81'; Fernandinho (yellow card) 62' (yellow-red card) 70'; Agüero (yellow card) 90'	Report	Doumbia 2', 34'; Wernbloom (yellow card) 28'; Ignashevich (yellow card) 77'; Eremenko (yellow card) 79'	Stadium: Etihad Stadium; Attendance: 45,143; Referee: Anastasios Sidiropoulos (Greece)

25 November 2014 5	CSKA Moscow (Russia)	1 – 1	(Italy) Roma	Khimki, Russia
20:00 MSK (UTC+4)	Dzagoev (yellow card) 38'; Berezutski (yellow card) 42' (goal) 90+3'; Schennikov (yellow card) 85'	Report	Totti 43'	Stadium: Arena Khimki; Attendance: 0 Referee: Felix Brych (Germany)
Note: Match played behind closed as a punishment by UEFA, after incidents at the Roma v CSKA Moscow match on 17 September 2014.

10 December 2014 6	Bayern Munich (Germany)	3 – 0	(Russia) CSKA Moscow	Munich, Germany
23:45 MSK (UTC+4)	Müller 18' (pen.); Dante (yellow card) 68'; Rode 84'; Götze 90'	Report	Natcho (yellow card) 27'; Dzagoev (yellow card) 70'; Ignashevich (yellow card) 90+2'	Stadium: Allianz Arena; Attendance: 68,000; Referee: Olegário Benquerença (Portugal)

== Squad statistics ==
As of match played 30 May 2015

=== Appearances and goals ===
No.	Pos	Nat	Player	Total		Premier League		Russian Cup		Champions League		Super Cup	
No.	Pos	Nat	Player	Apps	Goals	Apps	Goals	Apps	Goals	Apps	Goals	Apps	Goals
1	GK	(Russia) RUS	Sergei Chepchugov	2	0	0	0	2	0	0	0	0	0
2	DF	(Brazil) BRA	Mário Fernandes	39	0	29	0	3	0	6	0	1	0
3	MF	(Sweden) SWE	Pontus Wernbloom	32	3	24+1	2	4	0	2	0	1	1
4	DF	(Russia) RUS	Sergei Ignashevich	39	0	30	0	2	0	6	0	1	0
6	DF	(Russia) RUS	Aleksei Berezutski	10	0	1+6	0	1	0	2	0	0	0
7	MF	(Serbia) SRB	Zoran Tošić	34	7	22+5	6	1	0	3+2	0	1	1
8	FW	(Russia) RUS	Kirill Panchenko	19	1	4+11	1	1+1	0	0+1	0	1	0
10	MF	(Russia) RUS	Alan Dzagoev	28	7	18+3	5	3+1	2	3	0	0	0
14	DF	(Russia) RUS	Kirill Nababkin	26	1	18+2	1	3	0	2	0	1	0
15	MF	(Russia) RUS	Dmitri Yefremov	20	0	0+11	0	2+1	0	0+5	0	0+1	0
18	FW	(Nigeria) NGR	Ahmed Musa	39	11	28+2	10	2	0	6	1	1	0
19	MF	(Latvia) LAT	Aleksandrs Cauņa	8	0	0+5	0	0+1	0	1+1	0	0	0
23	MF	(Bulgaria) BUL	Georgi Milanov	38	2	24+4	2	3	0	3+3	0	1	0
24	DF	(Russia) RUS	Vasili Berezutski	40	2	30	1	3	0	6	1	1	0
25	MF	(Finland) FIN	Roman Eremenko	33	13	25	13	1+1	0	6	0	0	0
35	GK	(Russia) RUS	Igor Akinfeev	39	0	30	0	2	0	6	0	1	0
42	DF	(Russia) RUS	Georgi Schennikov	19	0	12	0	1+1	0	4+1	0	0	0
46	FW	(Russia) RUS	Nikolai Dergachyov	1	0	0	0	0+1	0	0	0	0	0
47	DF	(Russia) RUS	Pavel Kotov	1	0	0	0	1	0	0	0	0	0
60	MF	(Russia) RUS	Aleksandr Golovin	10	0	0+7	0	2+1	0	0	0	0	0
66	MF	(Israel) ISR	Bibras Natcho	34	14	24+2	12	2	1	6	1	0	0
85	MF	(Cameroon) CMR	Gaël Ondoua	1	0	0	0	0+1	0	0	0	0	0
91	DF	(Russia) RUS	Nikita Chernov	2	0	0	0	2	0	0	0	0	0
97	FW	(Sweden) SWE	Carlos Strandberg	11	3	3+7	3	1	0	0	0	0	0
98	MF	(Russia) RUS	Svyatoslav Georgievskiy	1	0	0	0	0+1	0	0	0	0	0
Players away from the club on loan:
11	FW	(Brazil) BRA	Vitinho	6	1	0+5	1	0	0	0	0	0+1	0
71	FW	(Russia) RUS	Konstantin Bazelyuk	3	1	0+1	0	2	1	0	0	0	0
Players who left CSKA Moscow during the season:
8	MF	(Switzerland) SUI	Steven Zuber	3	0	0+2	0	0	0	0	0	0+1	0
88	FW	(Ivory Coast) CIV	Seydou Doumbia	20	11	8+5	7	0	0	4+2	3	1	1

=== Goal scorers ===
Place	Position	Nation	Number	Name	Premier League	Russian Cup	UEFA Champions League	Super Cup	Total
1	MF	(Israel)	66	Bibras Natcho	12	1	1	0	14
2	MF	(Finland)	25	Roman Eremenko	13	0	0	0	13
3	FW	(Nigeria)	18	Ahmed Musa	10	0	1	0	11
3	FW	(Ivory Coast)	88	Seydou Doumbia	7	0	3	1	11
5	MF	(Serbia)	7	Zoran Tošić	6	0	0	1	8
6	MF	(Russia)	10	Alan Dzagoev	5	2	0	0	7
7	FW	(Sweden)	97	Carlos Strandberg	3	0	0	0	3
7	MF	(Sweden)	3	Pontus Wernbloom	2	0	0	1	3
7				Own goal	2	1	0	0	3
10	MF	(Bulgaria)	23	Georgi Milanov	2	0	0	0	2
10	DF	(Russia)	24	Vasili Berezutski	1	0	1	0	2
12	FW	(Russia)	8	Kirill Panchenko	1	0	0	0	1
12	FW	(Brazil)	31	Vitinho	1	0	0	0	1
12	DF	(Russia)	14	Kirill Nababkin	1	0	0	0	1
12	FW	(Russia)	71	Konstantin Bazelyuk	0	1	0	0	1
				TOTALS	67	5	6	3	83

=== Disciplinary record ===
Number	Nation	Position	Name	Premier League		Russian Cup		UEFA Champions League		Super Cup		Total	
Number	Nation	Position	Name	Yellow card	Red card	Yellow card	Red card	Yellow card	Red card	Yellow card	Red card	Yellow card	Red card
2	(Brazil)	DF	Mário Fernandes	3	0	0	0	0	0	0	0	3	0
3	(Sweden)	MF	Pontus Wernbloom	13	0	1	0	1	0	1	0	16	0
4	(Russia)	DF	Sergei Ignashevich	7	0	0	0	2	0	1	0	7	0
7	(Serbia)	MF	Zoran Tošić	1	0	0	0	0	0	0	0	1	0
10	(Russia)	MF	Alan Dzagoev	0	0	0	0	2	0	0	0	2	0
14	(Russia)	DF	Kirill Nababkin	3	1	0	0	0	0	0	0	3	1
23	(Bulgaria)	MF	Georgi Milanov	4	0	1	0	0	0	0	0	5	0
24	(Russia)	DF	Vasili Berezutski	1	0	0	0	1	0	0	0	2	0
25	(Finland)	MF	Roman Eremenko	3	0	2	1	2	0	0	0	7	1
31	(Brazil)	FW	Vitinho	1	0	0	0	0	0	0	0	1	0
35	(Russia)	GK	Igor Akinfeev	2	0	0	0	0	0	0	0	2	0
42	(Russia)	DF	Georgi Schennikov	3	0	1	0	1	0	0	0	5	0
66	(Israel)	MF	Bibras Natcho	2	0	0	0	1	0	0	0	3	0
88	(Ivory Coast)	FW	Seydou Doumbia	2	0	0	0	0	0	0	0	2	0
			TOTALS	42	1	5	1	10	0	2	0	59	2

== Notes ==
Notes

2. The CSKA Moscow v Bayern Munich match was played behind closed doors due to punishment by UEFA.
3. The CSKA Moscow v Manchester City and v Roma matches will be played behind closed doors due to punishment by UEFA, after incidents at the Roma v CSKA Moscow match on 17 September 2014.
- MSK time changed from UTC+4 to UTC+3 permanently on 26 October 2014.
