= List of Latvian football transfers winter 2017–18 =

This is a list of Latvian football transfers in the 2017–18 winter transfer window by club. Only transfers of the Virslīga are included.

All transfers mentioned are shown in the references at the bottom of the page. If you wish to insert a transfer that isn't mentioned there, please add a reference.

== Latvian Higher League ==
=== Spartaks ===
In: Note: Flags indicate national team as defined under FIFA eligibility rules; some limited exceptions apply. Players may hold more than one non-FIFA nationality.

No.	Pos.	Nation	Player
—	GK	LVA	Andrejs Pavlovs (from Ventspils)
—	DF	LVA	Gints Freimanis (from Jelgava)
—	DF	LVA	Mārcis Ošs (from Jelgava)
—	DF	BRA	Gabriel Mello Reichert (on loan from (Brazil) São Bernardo FC)
—	MF	FIN	Sergei Eremenko (from (Switzerland) FC Basel)
—	MF	LVA	Jurijs Žigajevs (from Ventspils)
—	MF	LVA	Aleksejs Višņakovs (from RFS)
—	MF	LVA	Andrejs Kovaļovs (from Riga)
—	MF	NCA	Jonathan Moncada (from (Nicaragua) Real Estelí)
—	MF	RUS	Gadzhi Adzhiyev (from (Russia) Anzhi Makhachkala)
—	MF	RUS	Artemi Maleyev (from (Russia) Baltika Kaliningrad)
—	MF	RUS	Oleg Dmitriyev (from (Russia) Baltika Kaliningrad)
—	MF	SRB	Nikola Kovačević (from (Serbia) Radnički Niš)
—	FW	LVA	Kaspars Svārups (from (Norway) Sortland IL)
—	FW	NCA	Ariagner Smith (from (Nicaragua) Real Estelí)
—	FW	GHA	Kojo Obeng Junior (from (Ghana) Wamanafo Nea Salamina)
—	FW	SRB	Marko Simić (from (Serbia) Novi Pazar)
—	FW	LVA	Rolands Vagančuks (from Liepāja-2)
—	FW	RUS	Yevgeni Kobzar (from (Estonia) Levadia Tallinn)

Out: Note: Flags indicate national team as defined under FIFA eligibility rules; some limited exceptions apply. Players may hold more than one non-FIFA nationality.

No.	Pos.	Nation	Player
1	GK	LVA	Vitālijs Meļņičenko (to Ventspils)
2	DF	CRO	Luka Šimunović (to (Belarus) Shakhtyor Soligorsk)
3	DF	LVA	Elvis Stuglis (to Riga FC)
4	DF	LVA	Ņikita Bērenfelds (loan return to Liepāja)
8	MF	LVA	Jevgēņijs Kazačoks (to RFS)
9	MF	BLR	Sergey Pushnyakov (to (Belarus) FC Gorodeya)
11	MF	RUS	Yevgeni Kozlov (to (Belarus) Shakhtyor Soligorsk)
14	MF	UZB	Aziz Ibragimov (to (Uzbekistan) FK Buxoro)
18	MF	LVA	Pāvels Pilāts (to FK Tukums 2000)
19	DF	LVA	Klāvs Bāliņš (to RTU FC/Skonto Academy)
20	MF	CRO	Kruno Ivančić (to (Slovenia) NK Aluminij)
21	FW	LVA	Vladislavs Kozlovs (to Jelgava)
22	MF	UKR	Artem Habelok (released)
23	FW	BLR	Dzmitry Platonaw (to RFS)
35	GK	RUS	Alexey Kozlov (to (Lithuania) Utenis Utena)
-	MF	FIN	Sergei Eremenko (on loan to (Russia) Spartak Moscow)

=== Liepāja ===
In: Note: Flags indicate national team as defined under FIFA eligibility rules; some limited exceptions apply. Players may hold more than one non-FIFA nationality.

No.	Pos.	Nation	Player
—	DF	LVA	Ņikita Bērenfelds (loan return from Spartaks)
—	DF	LVA	Endijs Šlampe (from Jelgava)
—	DF	LVA	Antons Jemeļins (from Ventspils)
—	DF	ARG	Alexis Zárate (from (Argentina) Club Atlético Independiente)
—	DF	ARG	Gonzalo Negro (from (Argentina) Juventud Unida Rio Cuarto)
—	MF	LVA	Toms Gucs (loan return from Grobiņas SC)
—	MF	LVA	Igors Kozlovs (from RFS)
—	MF	LVA	Jānis Ikaunieks (on loan from (France) FC Metz)
—	FW	LVA	Dēvids Dobrecovs (loan return from Grobiņas SC)
—	FW	LVA	Verners Apiņš (from Jelgava)

Out: Note: Flags indicate national team as defined under FIFA eligibility rules; some limited exceptions apply. Players may hold more than one non-FIFA nationality.

No.	Pos.	Nation	Player
2	DF	MNE	Mihailo Tomkovic (released)
3	DF	LVA	Oskars Kļava (retired)
4	DF	SEN	Sady Gueye (to Jelgava)
5	MF	MTN	Abdoulaye Gaye (to (Mauritania) FC Nouadhibou)
8	DF	RUS	Stanislav Lebamba (to BFC Daugavpils)
9	FW	LVA	Marks Kurtišs (to Jelgava)
15	DF	LVA	Antons Tumanovs (to Grobiņas SC)
17	MF	UKR	Serhiy Shevchuk (to (Ukraine) Ahrobiznes Volochysk)
18	MF	LVA	Krišs Kārkliņš (to Riga FC)
19	MF	LVA	Valērijs Afanasjevs (to BFC Daugavpils)
22	MF	LVA	Andris Krušatins (to Jelgava)
77	MF	GEO	Giorgi Eristavi (to (Georgia (country)) FC Samtredia)
86	DF	CRO	Dario Tomić (to (Montenegro) Mladost Podgorica)
87	MF	GEO	Luka Zviadadze (to (Georgia (country)) FC Rustavi)
88	MF	MTN	Alassane Diop (to (Mauritania) FC Nouadhibou)
-	MF	LVA	Romāns Mickevičs (to Riga FC, previously on loan)

=== Riga FC ===
In: Note: Flags indicate national team as defined under FIFA eligibility rules; some limited exceptions apply. Players may hold more than one non-FIFA nationality.

No.	Pos.	Nation	Player
—	GK	LVA	Germans Māliņš (from RFS)
—	GK	LVA	Nils Puriņš (from Jelgava)
—	DF	LVA	Antonijs Černomordijs (loan return from (Cyprus) Pafos FC)
—	DF	LVA	Elvis Stuglis (from Spartaks)
—	DF	SRB	Mario Maslać (from (Kazakhstan) Irtysh Pavlodar)
—	DF	UKR	Volodymyr Bayenko (from (Uzbekistan) FK Buxoro)
—	MF	LVA	Romāns Mickevičs (from Liepāja, previously on loan)
—	MF	LVA	Krišs Kārkliņš (from Liepāja)
—	MF	SLE	George Davies (on loan from (Austria) SKN St. Pölten)
—	MF	UKR	Valeriy Fedorchuk (from (Ukraine) Veres Rivne)
—	MF	BRA	Luiz Paulo Hilário (from (Greece) Athlitiki Enosi Larissa)
—	FW	UKR	Bohdan Kovalenko (from (Cyprus) Pafos FC)
—	FW	CMR	Gaël Etock (from (Finland) JJK Jyväskylä)
—	FW	LVA	Aleksejs Davidenkovs (from RFS)
—	FW	UKR	Serhiy Zahynaylov (from (Moldova) Zaria Bălți)

Out: Note: Flags indicate national team as defined under FIFA eligibility rules; some limited exceptions apply. Players may hold more than one non-FIFA nationality.

No.	Pos.	Nation	Player
1	GK	LVA	Vladislavs Kurakins (to (Austria) Karabakh Wien)
5	DF	SRB	Dušan Brković (to (Hungary) Diósgyőri VTK)
8	MF	LVA	Andrejs Kovaļovs (to Spartaks)
11	FW	LVA	Daniils Turkovs (released)
13	DF	LVA	Kaspars Gorkšs (to FK Auda)
15	MF	LVA	Ņikita Juhņevičs (to RTU FC/Skonto Academy)
32	DF	LVA	Oļegs Timofejevs (released)
41	MF	JPN	Minori Sato (to (South Korea) Gwangju FC)
45	FW	MNE	Đorđe Šušnjar (to (Belarus) Torpedo Minsk)
50	DF	GHA	David Addy (released)
82	GK	LVA	Vjačeslavs Kudrjavcevs (to (Poland) Legia Warsaw)

=== Ventspils ===
In: Note: Flags indicate national team as defined under FIFA eligibility rules; some limited exceptions apply. Players may hold more than one non-FIFA nationality.

No.	Pos.	Nation	Player
—	GK	LVA	Vitālijs Meļņičenko (from Spartaks)
—	GK	LVA	Aleksandrs Vlasovs (from BFC Daugavpils)
—	DF	TOG	Abdoul-Gafar Mamah (from (Moldova) Dacia Chișinău)
—	DF	LVA	Dmitrijs Klimašēvičs (from BFC Daugavpils)
—	DF	LVA	Dmitrijs Litvinskis (from BFC Daugavpils)
—	MF	ANG	Amâncio Fortes (from (Moldova) Dacia Chișinău)
—	MF	CPV	Sténio (from (Moldova) Dacia Chișinău)
—	MF	MDA	Maxim Cojocaru (from (Moldova) Dacia Chișinău)
—	FW	UKR	Oleksiy Antonov (from (Ukraine) Chornomorets Odesa)
—	FW	LVA	Kaspars Kokins (from BFC Daugavpils)

Out: Note: Flags indicate national team as defined under FIFA eligibility rules; some limited exceptions apply. Players may hold more than one non-FIFA nationality.

No.	Pos.	Nation	Player
2	MF	LVA	Vladimirs Mukins (to FK Tukums 2000)
6	DF	LVA	Igors Savčenkovs (retired)
7	MF	LVA	Jurijs Žigajevs (to Spartaks)
9	FW	ARM	Viulen Ayvazyan (to (Belarus) Dnepr Mogilev)
14	MF	BLR	Artsyom Vaskow (to (Belarus) FC Smolevichi)
16	GK	LVA	Andrejs Pavlovs (to Spartaks)
18	MF	LTU	Simonas Paulius (to (Lithuania) Kauno Žalgiris)
19	FW	LVA	Ralfs Akmins (to FK Smiltene/BJSS)
26	DF	LVA	Antons Jemeļins (to Liepāja)

=== RFS ===
In: Note: Flags indicate national team as defined under FIFA eligibility rules; some limited exceptions apply. Players may hold more than one non-FIFA nationality.

No.	Pos.	Nation	Player
—	GK	LVA	Dmitrijs Grigorjevs (from METTA/LU)
—	GK	LVA	Kaspars Ikstens (from Jelgava)
—	DF	GHA	Ofosu Appiah (from (Estonia) FCI Tallinn)
—	MF	LVA	Gļebs Kļuškins (from Jelgava)
—	MF	GEO	Beka Vachiberadze (from (Spain) Betis Deportivo Balompié)
—	MF	LVA	Dāvis Indrāns (from METTA/LU)
—	MF	LVA	Jevgēņijs Kazačoks (from Spartaks)
—	MF	UKR	Maksym Marusych (from (Lithuania) FK Jonava)
—	FW	LVA	Artis Jaudzems (from Jelgava)
—	FW	BLR	Dzmitry Platonaw (from Spartaks)

Out: Note: Flags indicate national team as defined under FIFA eligibility rules; some limited exceptions apply. Players may hold more than one non-FIFA nationality.

No.	Pos.	Nation	Player
1	GK	LVA	Germans Māliņš (to Riga FC)
3	DF	LVA	Renārs Rode (to (Malaysia) Negeri Sembilan)
7	MF	LVA	Daniils Hvoiņickis (to SK Super Nova)
10	MF	LVA	Aleksejs Višņakovs (to Spartaks)
14	FW	LVA	Sergejs Vorobjovs (to BFC Daugavpils)
17	MF	LVA	Igors Kozlovs (to Liepāja)
20	MF	GEO	Giorgi Diakvnishvili (released)
21	FW	BLR	Leonid Kovel (to (Belarus) Neman Grodno)
22	MF	SRB	Srđan Dimitrov (to (Malta) Birkirkara F.C.)
23	MF	LVA	Kristaps Liepa (to METTA/LU)
24	FW	LVA	Aleksejs Davidenkovs (to Riga FC)
35	GK	RUS	Daniil Sizko (to (Russia) Leningradets Leningrad Oblast)
81	MF	LVA	Iļja Šadčins (released)

=== Jelgava ===
In: Note: Flags indicate national team as defined under FIFA eligibility rules; some limited exceptions apply. Players may hold more than one non-FIFA nationality.

No.	Pos.	Nation	Player
—	GK	LVA	Mārcis Melecis (from (Lithuania) Dainava Alytus)
—	DF	RUS	Vyacheslav Yemelyanenko (from (Lithuania) Vytis Vilnius)
—	DF	RUS	Maksim Shiryayev (from (Russia) FSK Dolgoprudny)
—	DF	SEN	Sady Gueye (from Liepāja)
—	DF	LTU	Sigitas Olberkis (from (Belarus) Dnepr Mogilev)
—	MF	LTU	Mindaugas Grigaravičius (loan return from (Lithuania) FK Jonava)
—	MF	LVA	Andris Krušatins (from Liepāja)
—	MF	JPN	Ryotaro Nakano (from (Thailand) Chonburi F.C.)
—	FW	LVA	Marks Kurtišs (from Liepāja)
—	FW	LVA	Vladislavs Kozlovs (from Spartaks)
—	FW	RUS	Aleksandr Nekrasov (on loan from (Russia) Zenit-2 Saint Petersburg)
—	FW	RUS	Nikita Kolyayev (from (Russia) FC Ryazan)

Out: Note: Flags indicate national team as defined under FIFA eligibility rules; some limited exceptions apply. Players may hold more than one non-FIFA nationality.

No.	Pos.	Nation	Player
1	GK	LVA	Kaspars Ikstens (to RFS)
2	DF	LVA	Reinis Flaksis (to Grobiņas SC)
3	DF	LVA	Endijs Šlampe (to Liepāja)
4	MF	LVA	Vadims Avdejevs (to SK Super Nova)
5	DF	LVA	Gints Freimanis (to Spartaks)
10	MF	LVA	Andrejs Perepļotkins (to SK Super Nova)
11	FW	LTU	Evaldas Razulis (released)
13	MF	MYA	Kler Heh (to (Lithuania) FK Jonava)
16	GK	LVA	Nils Puriņš (to Riga FC)
18	DF	LVA	Dmitrijs Klimaševičs (loan return to BFC Daugavpils)
20	DF	CRO	Ante Bakmaz (to (Lithuania) Kauno Žalgiris)
21	FW	LVA	Verners Apiņš (to Liepāja)
23	MF	LVA	Gļebs Kļuškins (to RFS)
25	DF	LVA	Mārcis Ošs (to Spartaks)
27	FW	EST	Kevin Kauber (to (Wales) The New Saints F.C.)
29	FW	LVA	Artis Jaudzems (to RFS)

=== METTA/LU ===
In: Note: Flags indicate national team as defined under FIFA eligibility rules; some limited exceptions apply. Players may hold more than one non-FIFA nationality.

No.	Pos.	Nation	Player
—	GK	LVA	Helmuts Saulītis (from JDFS Alberts)
—	DF	LVA	Rihards Pētersons (from Liepāja-2)
—	MF	CAN	Benson Fazili (from (Canada) X-uvia Soccer Academy)
—	MF	LVA	Kristaps Liepa (from RFS)
—	MF	RUS	Tamirlan Dzhamalutdinov (from (Russia) Anzhi Makhachkala)
—	FW	LVA	Ņikita Kovaļonoks (Free agent)

Out: Note: Flags indicate national team as defined under FIFA eligibility rules; some limited exceptions apply. Players may hold more than one non-FIFA nationality.

No.	Pos.	Nation	Player
1	GK	LVA	Dmitrijs Grigorjevs (to RFS)
5	MF	LVA	Dāvis Indrāns (to RFS)
10	FW	NGA	Adamu Abdullahi (to (New Zealand) Waiheke United)
11	FW	LVA	Konstantīns Fjodorovs (to Valmiera)
17	FW	LVA	Artūrs Švalbe (to JDFS Alberts)
19	FW	LVA	Gatis Kalniņš (to Valmiera)
20	FW	LVA	Aivars Emsis (to JDFS Alberts)
25	DF	GHA	Abraham Anane Ashrifie (released)
26	DF	LVA	Roberts Ralfs Gudēns (to JDFS Alberts)

=== Valmiera ===
In: Note: Flags indicate national team as defined under FIFA eligibility rules; some limited exceptions apply. Players may hold more than one non-FIFA nationality.

No.	Pos.	Nation	Player
—	GK	LVA	Marks Bogdanovs (from AFA Olaine)
—	DF	BLR	Nikita Rochev (from (Belarus) FC Lida)
—	DF	MDA	Alexandru Belevschi (from (Romania) Foresta Suceava)
—	DF	SEN	Massamba Sambou (from (Andorra) FC Lusitanos)
—	DF	RUS	Ivan Knyazev (from (Russia) Kubansakaya Korona Shevchenko)
—	MF	FRA	Thierry Mukuta (from (France) UJA Maccabi Paris)
—	MF	NGA	Leonardo Okeke (from (Nigeria) My People FC)
—	MF	LVA	Jānis Taulavičus (from Staiceles Bebri)
—	MF	LVA	Eduards Stīpnieks (from Smiltene/BJSS)
—	FW	LVA	Gatis Kalniņš (from METTA/LU)
—	FW	CMR	Christian Song Ngan (from Mount Cameroon FC)
—	FW	LVA	Konstantīns Fjodorovs (from METTA/LU)

Out: Note: Flags indicate national team as defined under FIFA eligibility rules; some limited exceptions apply. Players may hold more than one non-FIFA nationality.

No.	Pos.	Nation	Player
2	DF	LVA	Kārlis Lācis (to Staiceles Bebri)
7	MF	LVA	Maksims Koļesņikovs (to Staiceles Bebri)
25	MF	LVA	Nauris Ģērmanis (to Staiceles Bebri)
