= Andrei Churin =

Russian football player

Personal information
- Full name: Andrei Vyacheslavovich Churin
- Date of birth: 2 August 1995 (age 31)
- Height: 1.87 m (6 ft 2 in)
- Position: Midfielder

Youth career
- FC Volga Nizhny Novgorod

Senior career*
Years	Team	Apps	(Gls)
2012–2015	FC Volga Nizhny Novgorod	18	(0)
2017	FC Zorky Krasnogorsk	1	(0)
- * Club domestic league appearances and goals

Andrei Vyacheslavovich Churin (Russian: Андрей Вячеславович Чурин; born 2 August 1995) is a Russian former football player.

== Club career ==
He made his professional debut in the Russian Football National League for FC Volga Nizhny Novgorod on 10 August 2014 in a game against FC Volgar Astrakhan.
