= Tsybikov =

Tsybikov or Tsibikov (Russian: Цы́биков) is a Buryat masculine surname originating from the given name Tsybik, which means centenarian in Lhasa Tibetan. Its feminine counterpart is Tsybikova or Tsibikova. The surname may refer to the following notable people:

- Aleksandr Tsybikov (born 1994), Russian football defender
- Gombojab Tsybikov (1873–1930), Russian explorer of Tibet
