= Nikolai Savichev =

Russian footballer

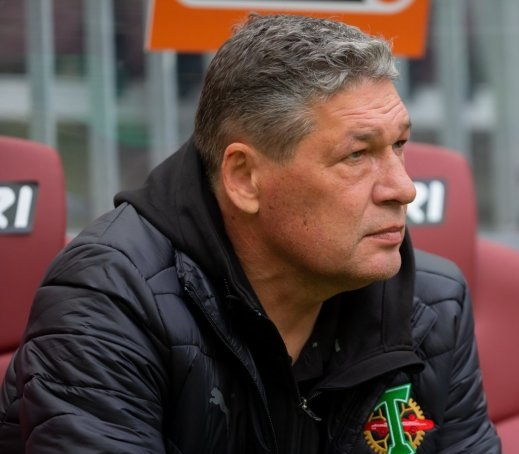
- Savichev with Torpedo Moscow in 2022

Personal information
- Full name: Nikolai Nikolayevich Savichev
- Date of birth: 13 February 1965 (age 61)
- Place of birth: Moscow, Russian SFSR
- Height: 1.81 m (5 ft 11 in)
- Positions: Forward; midfielder

Team information
- Current team: Academy FC Torpedo Moscow

Youth career
- 1975–: Soyuz Moscow
- FShM Moscow

Senior career*
Years	Team	Apps	(Gls)
1983–1984	FShM Moscow	11	(1)
1984–1993	FC Torpedo Moscow	206	(26)
Total		217	(27)

International career
1986–1988	USSR (Olympic)	1	(0)
1988	USSR	3	(0)

Managerial career
- 2001–2002: FC Torpedo-ZIL Moscow (U21 assistant)
- 2003–2006: Russia (born in 1987) (assistant)
- 2006–2010: Russia (born in 1991)
- 2011–2012: FC Torpedo Moscow (assistant)
- 2012: FC Torpedo Moscow (caretaker)
- 2012–2013: FC Torpedo Moscow (assistant)
- 2013: FC Torpedo Moscow (caretaker)
- 2013–2014: FC Torpedo Moscow (assistant)
- 2014: FC Torpedo Moscow
- 2014–2018: FC Torpedo Moscow (assistant)
- 2018–2019: FC Khimki-M
- 2019–2020: FC Torpedo Moscow
- 2020–2022: FC Torpedo Moscow (youth teams)
- 2022: FC Torpedo Moscow
- 2022–2023: FC Torpedo Moscow (assistant)
- 2025–: Academy FC Torpedo Moscow
- * Club domestic league appearances and goals

Nikolai Nikolayevich Savichev (Russian: Николай Николаевич Савичев; born 13 February 1965) is a Russian football coach and a former player. He is the identical twin brother of Yuri Savichev and a father of Daniil Savichev.

== Honours ==
- Soviet Top League bronze: 1988, 1991.
- Soviet Cup winner: 1986.
- Russian Cup winner: 1993.
- Top 33 players year-end list: 1988, 1990.

== International career ==
Savichev made his debut for USSR on 21 November 1988 in a friendly against Syria.
