= Nikolai Dergachyov =

Russian footballer

Personal information
- Full name: Nikolai Aleksandrovich Dergachyov
- Date of birth: 24 May 1994 (age 32)
- Place of birth: Petrovo, Serebryano-Prudsky District, Russia
- Height: 1.72 m (5 ft 8 in)
- Positions: Forward; midfielder

Senior career*
Years	Team	Apps	(Gls)
2011	FC Saturn-2 Moscow Oblast	17	(0)
2012–2016	PFC CSKA Moscow	0	(0)
2015	→ FK Dukla Prague (loan)	1	(0)
2016	→ FSK Dolgoprudny (loan)	11	(2)
2016–2018	FC Sokol Saratov	23	(0)
2018	FC Saturn Ramenskoye	6	(0)
2020	FC Irtysh Omsk	4	(0)
- * Club domestic league appearances and goals

Nikolai Aleksandrovich Dergachyov (Russian: Николай Александрович Дергачёв; born 24 May 1994) is a former association football player from Russia.

== Club career ==
He made his debut in the Russian Second Division for FC Saturn-2 Moscow Oblast on 24 May 2011 in a game against FC Istra.

He made his debut for the senior squad of PFC CSKA Moscow on 24 September 2014 in the Russian Cup game against FC Khimik Dzerzhinsk.

He made his Russian Football National League debut for FC Sokol Saratov on 11 July 2016 in a game against FC Zenit-2 Saint Petersburg.
