= Daniil Savichev =

Russian footballer

Personal information
- Full name: Daniil Nikolayevich Savichev
- Date of birth: 12 June 1994 (age 32)
- Place of birth: Moscow, Russia
- Height: 1.81 m (5 ft 11 1/2 in)
- Position: Midfielder

Senior career*
Years	Team	Apps	(Gls)
2013–2016	FC Torpedo Moscow	4	(0)
2015	→ FC Saturn Ramenskoye (loan)	10	(0)
- * Club domestic league appearances and goals

Daniil Nikolayevich Savichev (Russian: Даниил Николаевич Савичев; born 12 June 1994) is a former Russian football midfielder.

== Club career ==
He made his debut in the Russian Football National League for FC Torpedo Moscow on 7 October 2013 in a game against FC Arsenal Tula.

== Personal life ==
He is a son of Nikolai Savichev.
