= Aleksandr Tukmanov =

Russian footballer and functionary

Personal information
- Full name: Aleksandr Vyacheslavovich Tukmanov
- Date of birth: April 28, 1950 (age 76)
- Place of birth: Moscow, Russian SFSR
- Position: Defender

Senior career*
Years	Team	Apps	(Gls)
1969–1975	FC Torpedo Moscow	74	(2)
1976	FC Spartak Moscow	0	(0)
1976	FC Torpedo Vladimir		
1977	FC Fakel Voronezh	36	(4)

Managerial career
- 1986–1988: USSR Olympic (director)
- 1992–1998: RFU (VP)
- 1992–1994: Russia (director)
- 1998–2005: RFU (general director)
- 2007–2008: FC Torpedo Moscow (president)
- 2009–2018: FC Torpedo Moscow (president)
- * Club domestic league appearances and goals

Aleksandr Vyacheslavovich Tukmanov (Russian: Александр Вячеславович Тукманов; born 28 April 1950) is a Russian professional football functionary and a former player.

As a player, he played 5 seasons in the Soviet Top League with FC Torpedo Moscow.
