= Vladimir Zavyalov (footballer) =

Russian footballer

Personal information
- Full name: Vladimir Andreyevich Zavyalov
- Date of birth: 7 April 1989 (age 37)
- Height: 1.75 m (5 ft 9 in)
- Position: Forward

Team information
- Current team: FC Dynamo Barnaul

Senior career*
Years	Team	Apps	(Gls)
2007	FC Shakhtyor Prokopyevsk	28	(6)
2008–2015	FC Dynamo Barnaul	127	(22)
2015–2016	FC Yakutiya Yakutsk	20	(5)
2016–2024	FC Dynamo Barnaul	159	(47)
- * Club domestic league appearances and goals as of 21 April 2024

Vladimir Andreyevich Zavyalov (Russian: Владимир Андреевич Завьялов; born 7 April 1989) is a Russian professional football player.

== Club career ==
He made his Russian Football National League debut for FC Dynamo Barnaul on 30 March 2008 in a game against FC Sibir Novosibirsk.
