= Aleksandr Tsybikov =

Russian footballer

Personal information
- Full name: Aleksandr Aleksandrovich Tsybikov
- Date of birth: 17 January 1994 (age 32)
- Place of birth: Moscow, Russia
- Height: 1.65 m (5 ft 5 in)
- Positions: Right back; left back

Senior career*
Years	Team	Apps	(Gls)
2013–2016	Torpedo Moscow	29	(0)
2015	→ Zenit Penza (loan)	16	(0)
2017–2018	Volga Ulyanovsk	7	(0)
2019	Krymteplitsa		
2019	Murom	8	(0)
2020	Zorky Krasnogorsk	0	(0)
2020	Volna Kovernino	4	(0)
2021	Lada Dimitrovgrad	12	(0)
2021	Zvezda Perm	3	(0)
2022	Metallurg Vidnoye	9	(0)
- * Club domestic league appearances and goals

Aleksandr Aleksandrovich Tsybikov (Russian: Александр Александрович Цыбиков; born 17 January 1994) is a Russian former professional football defender.

== Club career ==
He made his debut in the Russian Football National League for FC Torpedo Moscow on 22 April 2013 in a game against FC Salyut Belgorod.
