= Russia national youth football team =

The Russia national youth football teams are a group of four teams that represents Russia in association football at various specific age levels, ranging from under-17 to under-21. All of the teams are controlled by Russian Football Union, the governing body for football in Russia.

The teams are the following:

- Russia national under-21 football team
- Russia national under-20 football team
- Russia national under-19 football team
- Russia national under-17 football team
