= Aleksei Alekseyev =

Russian professional football player

Personal information
- Full name: Aleksei Andreyevich Alekseyev
- Date of birth: 12 June 1988 (age 38)
- Place of birth: Krasnogorsk, Moscow Oblast, Russian SFSR
- Height: 1.73 m (5 ft 8 in)
- Position: Striker

Senior career*
Years	Team	Apps	(Gls)
2010	FC Nara-ShBFR Naro-Fominsk	16	(2)
2011–2013	FC MITOS Novocherkassk	78	(11)
2013–2016	FC Baltika Kaliningrad	52	(3)
2016–2018	FK Ventspils	44	(9)
2018–2019	FC Zorky Krasnogorsk	21	(3)
- * Club domestic league appearances and goals

Aleksei Andreyevich Alekseyev (Russian: Алексей Андреевич Алексеев; born 12 June 1988) is a former Russian professional football player.

== Club career ==
He played 3 seasons in the Russian Football National League for FC Baltika Kaliningrad.
