= Sergei Yefimov =

Russian footballer

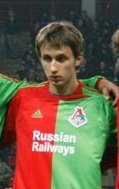
- Yefimov in 2007

Personal information
- Full name: Sergei Dmitrievich Yefimov
- Date of birth: 15 October 1987 (age 39)
- Place of birth: Kaliningrad, USSR
- Height: 1.85 m (6 ft 1 in)
- Position: Defender

Team information
- Current team: FC Lokomotiv Moscow (U-19 assistant coach)

Senior career*
| Years | Team | Apps | (Gls) |
| 2007–2010 | FC Lokomotiv Moscow | 24 | (0) |
| 2010 | → FC Dynamo Bryansk (loan) | 8 | (0) |
| 2011 | FC Lokomotiv-2 Moscow | 9 | (0) |
| 2011–2013 | FC Khimki | 34 | (0) |
| 2013–2015 | FC Torpedo Moscow | 9 | (1) |
| 2014 | → FC Zenit Penza (loan) | 1 | (0) |
| 2014 | → FC TSK Simferopol (loan) | 11 | (0) |

International career
| 2007–2008 | Russia U-21 | 2 | (0) |

Managerial career
- 2020–: FC Lokomotiv Moscow (U-19 assistant)
- * Club domestic league appearances and goals

Sergei Dmitrievich Yefimov (Russian: Серге́й Дмитриевич Ефимов, born 15 October 1987) is a Russian football coach and a former player. He works as an assistant coach for the Under-19 squad of FC Lokomotiv Moscow. His position was defender.

== International career ==
He was called up to the Russia national football team for a qualifier against Estonia because of a large amount injuries to key defenders but did not play.
