= Adam Kokoszka =

Polish footballer (born 1986)

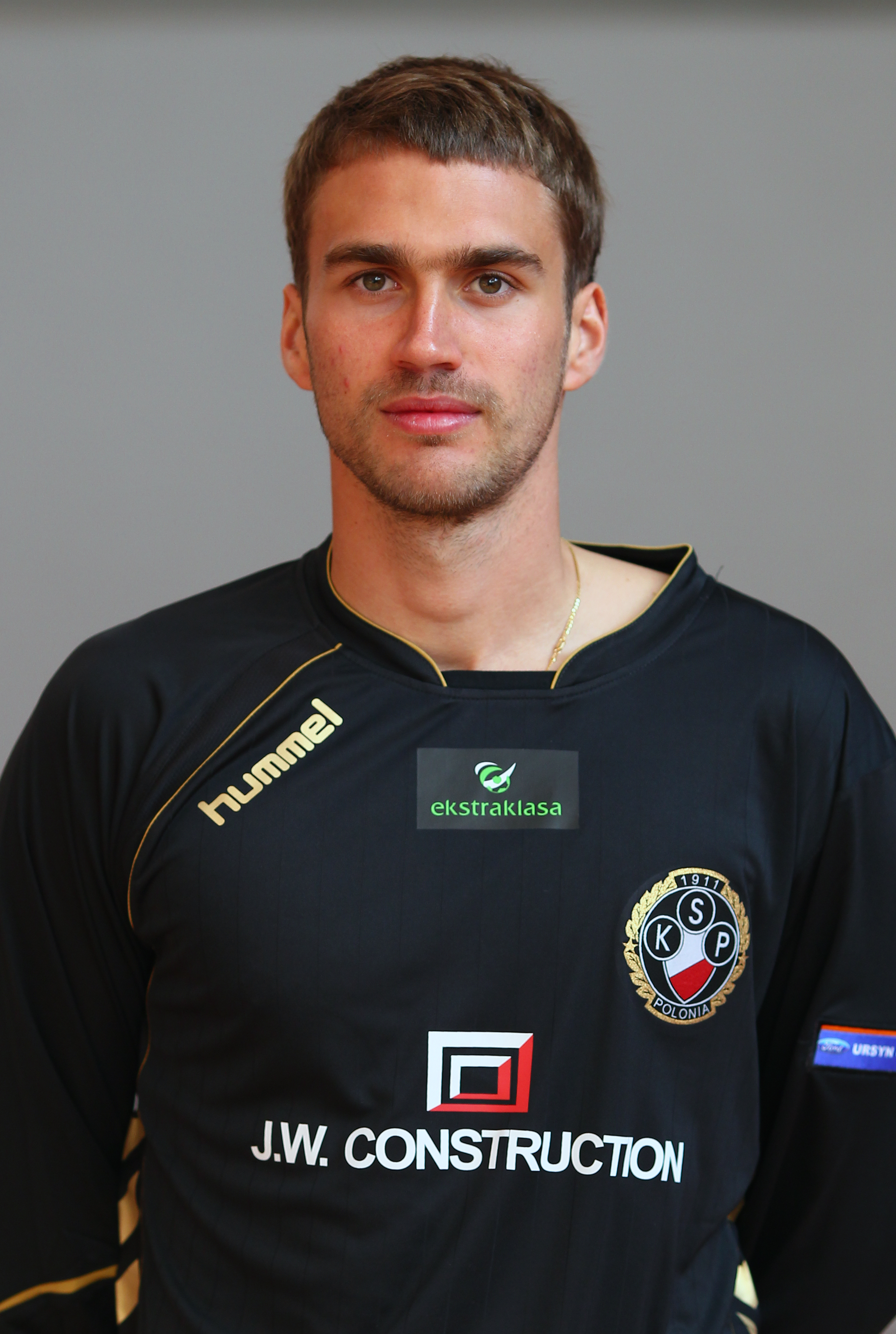
- Kokoszka in KSP colours, 2011

Personal information
- Date of birth: 6 October 1986 (age 40)
- Place of birth: Andrychów, Poland
- Height: 1.86 m (6 ft 1 in)
- Position: Centre-back

Youth career
- Beskid Andrychów

Senior career*
Years	Team	Apps	(Gls)
2003–2008	Wisła Kraków	21	(1)
2008–2011	Empoli	43	(0)
2011	→ Polonia Warsaw (loan)	11	(0)
2011–2013	Polonia Warsaw	38	(0)
2013–2014	Śląsk Wrocław	45	(2)
2014–2015	Torpedo Moscow	22	(0)
2015–2018	Śląsk Wrocław	57	(3)
2018–2019	Zagłębie Sosnowiec	4	(0)
2021–2022	Unia Tarnów	26	(0)
Total		267	(6)

International career
2006–2014	Poland	11	(2)
- * Club domestic league appearances and goals

Adam Kokoszka (Polish pronunciation: [ˈadam kɔˈkɔʂka], born 6 October 1986) is a Polish former professional footballer who played as a centre-back. Besides Poland, he has played in Italy and Russia.

== Club career ==
His debut for Wisła Kraków came on 4 August 2006 against Arka Gdynia.

On 28 July 2008, he signed a five-year contract with Empoli, using the Webster ruling to leave Wisla. Wisla brought the matter to FIFA but in October the organization cleared Kokoszka to play for Empoli. He debuted for his new club in a 4–0 win over U.S. Sassuolo Calcio on 28 October.

On 19 January 2011, a half-year loan transfer to Polonia Warsaw was announced.

In July 2014, Kokoszka signed a three-year contract with Torpedo Moscow, however in April 2015, Kokoszka left Torpedo Moscow having not been paid by the club for four months.

== International career ==
Although he had made only a few appearances for his club, he was noticed by Leo Beenhakker and debuted for the Poland national team a short while later, in a friendly away to the United Arab Emirates on 6 December 2006. In the next friendly match against Estonia he scored his first goal for Poland. He was called up for Euro 2008 and made one appearance, in Poland's final match against Croatia.

== Career statistics ==
=== International ===
Appearances and goals by national team and year
National team	Year	Apps	Goals
Poland
Poland	2006	1	0
Poland	2007	2	1
Poland	2008	6	1
Poland	2009	1	0
Poland	2014	1	0
Total		11	2

Scores and results list Poland's goal tally first, score column indicates score after each Kokoszka goal.

List of international goals scored by Adam Kokoszka
No.	Date	Venue	Opponent	Score	Result	Competition
1	3 February 2007	Jerez de la Frontera, Spain	Estonia	2–0	4–0	Friendly
2	2 February 2008	Pafos, Cyprus	Finland	1–0	1–0	Friendly

== Honours ==
Wisła Kraków

- Ekstraklasa: 2007–08

Unia Tarnów

- IV liga Lesser Poland East: 2020–21
