= Saturn Stadium =

Stadium In Ramenskoye, Russia

Coordinates: 55°34′39.08″N 38°13′35.30″E

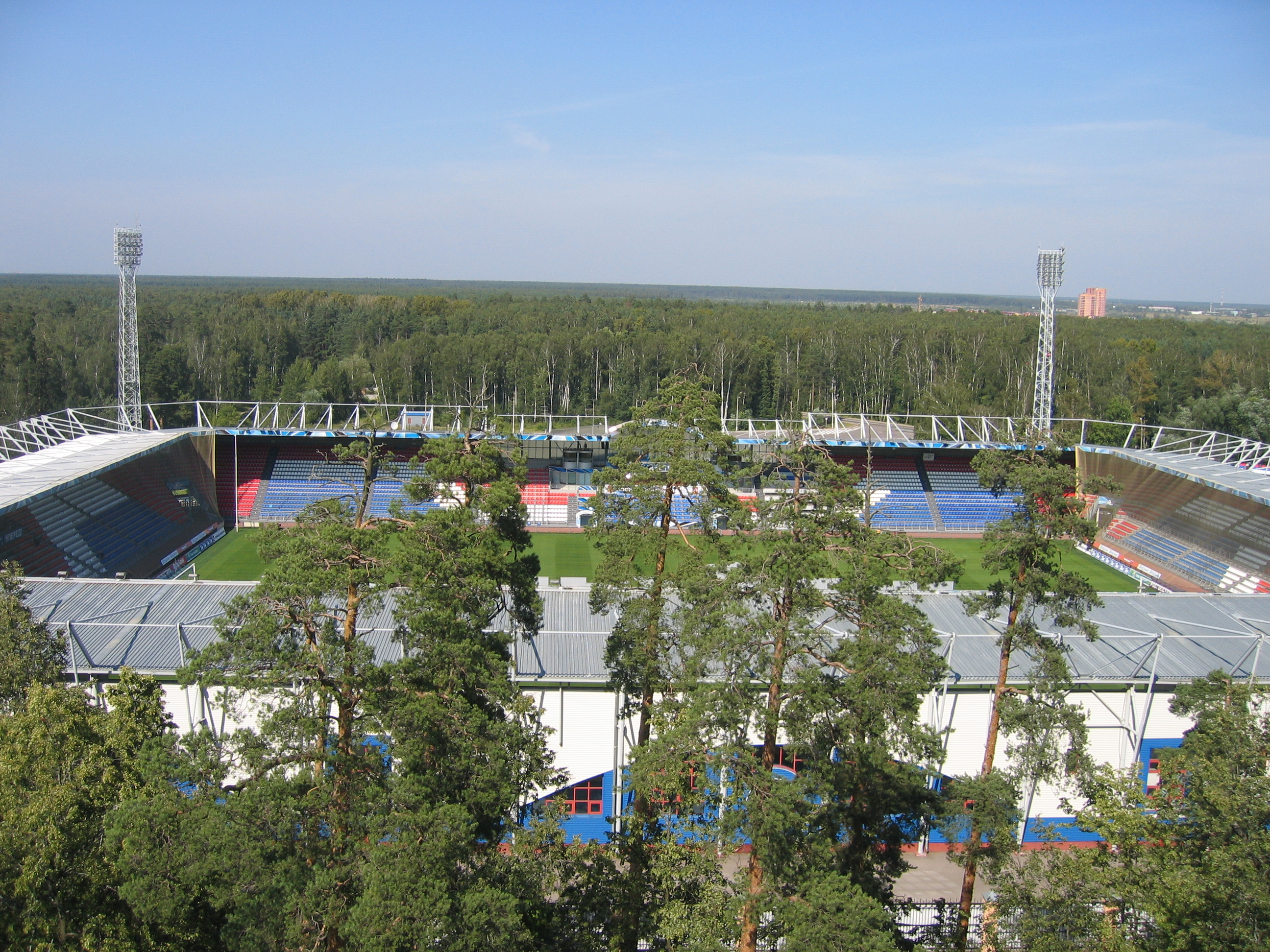

Saturn Stadium is a football stadium in Ramenskoye, Moscow Oblast, Russia. It is the home ground of third-tier side FC Saturn Ramenskoye and has also used by Torpedo Moscow. The stadium holds 14,685 and was built in 1999.

For the 2013–14 season and the first half of the 2014-15 season, Torpedo played at the Saturn Stadium instead of its home ground as a cost-saving measure amidst financial difficulties. This made Saturn Stadium the first Russian Premier League stadium built after the Soviet era. Since then, most stadiums in the league are even more modern grounds, built in accordance with 2018 FIFA World Cup standards.
