= Thierry Mukuta =

French footballer (born 1989)

Thierry Mukuta Kiesse
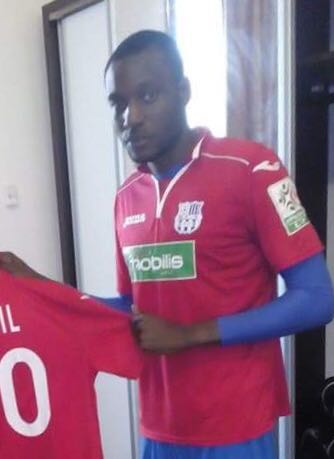
- Thierry Mukuta Kiesse in Algeria

Personal information
- Full name: Thierry Mukuta Kiesse
- Date of birth: 5 January 1989 (age 37)
- Place of birth: Paris, France
- Height: 1.87 m (6 ft 2 in)
- Position: Defensive midfielder

Team information
- Current team: FK Ferizaj

Youth career
- 2005–2009: SCO Angers B

Senior career*
Years	Team	Apps	(Gls)
2009–2010	Spandauer SV	34	(6)
2010–2011	SV Wacker Burghausen	17	(5)
2011–2013	US Orléans	49	(8)
2014–2015	RC Arbaa	24	(4)
2018–	FK Valmiera	-	(-)

International career
2012–2013	DR Congo U-21	3	
2015	DR Congo	3	
- * Club domestic league appearances and goals

Thierry Mukuta Kiesse (born 5 January 1989) is a Congolese footballer who currently plays as a defensive midfielder in FK Valmiera.

== Club career ==
Mukuta Kiesse started his playing career in 2005 with French club SCO Angers B where he became a reference. In 2009, he moved to German division Spandauer SV club in the Regionalliga Berlin 1 where he played 36 games and scoring 6 goals. The defensive midfielder was recruited in 3.Liga SV Wacker Burghausen club, in 2010, where he was trained by the famous Mario Basler. In 2011, Mukuta Kiesse decided to return in France to join the Ligue 2 US Orléans club for a season where he appeared in 49 of their matches and scoring 8 goals. Mukuta Kiesse joined the Ligue 1 Algerian RC Arbaa club in 2014.

== International career ==
Thierry Mukuta made three appearances for the Democratic Republic of the Congo under-21 and was also invited to the senior national team in 2015 by coach Florent Ibengé where he also made three appearances for the national team.
