= Nikola Kovačević (footballer) =

Serbian footballer

Personal information
- Full name: Nikola Kovačević
- Date of birth: 14 April 1994 (age 32)
- Place of birth: Kragujevac, FR Yugoslavia
- Height: 1.92 m (6 ft 4 in)
- Positions: Defensive midfielder; centre-back

Team information
- Current team: Šumadija 1903

Youth career
- Šumadija 1903

Senior career*
Years	Team	Apps	(Gls)
2013–2015	Radnički Kragujevac	39	(5)
2015–2017	Vojvodina	13	(0)
2016–2017	→ Spartak Subotica (loan)	14	(0)
2017–2018	Radnički Niš	14	(0)
2018	Spartaks Jūrmala	3	(0)
2018–2019	Radnik Surdulica	16	(0)
2019–2020	Mačva Šabac	9	(0)
2020–2021	Novi Pazar	23	(0)
2022	Radnički Kragujevac	17	(1)
2023	Al-Nasr	3	(0)
2023	Persikabo 1973	14	(1)
2024	Mladost DG	10	(0)
2024–2025	Persikota Tangerang	2	(0)
2026–	Šumadija 1903	0	(0)
- * Club domestic league appearances and goals as of 24 January 2025

Nikola Kovačević (Serbian Cyrillic: Никола Ковачевић; born 14 April 1994) is a Serbian professional footballer who plays as a defensive midfielder or centre-back for Šumadija 1903.

== Club career ==
Born in Kragujevac, Serbia, he joined several local Serbian clubs, and decided to go abroad for the first time to Latvia and joined FK Spartaks Jūrmala in the 2018 season. Then, In early 2023 season, he joined Libyan Premier League club Al-Nasr.

=== Persikabo 1973 ===
After a career in Libya, Kovačević was linked with a move to Indonesian Liga 1 club, PSIS Semarang. It is true that he continued his career in Indonesia, but he decided to join Liga 1 club Persikabo 1973 on 8 June 2023.
