= Alexandru Belevschi =

Moldovan footballer

Personal information
- Full name: Alexandru Belevschi
- Date of birth: 21 March 1995 (age 31)
- Place of birth: Moldova
- Height: 1.75 m (5 ft 9 in)
- Position: Defender

Youth career
- Zimbru Chișinău

Senior career*
Years	Team	Apps	(Gls)
2013–2017	Zimbru-2 Chișinău	47	(3)
2015–2017	Zimbru Chișinău	22	(0)
2016	→ Petrocub-Hîncești (loan)	11	(0)
2017	Milsami Orhei	0	(0)
2017	Foresta Suceava	13	(0)
2018	Valmiera	5	(0)
2019	Zimbru Chișinău	7	(0)
2019	Codru Lozova	7	(0)

International career^{‡}
2015–2016	Moldova U21 (Note: Only official UEFA matches included)	5	(0)
- * Club domestic league appearances and goals as of 29 September 2019 ‡ National team caps and goals as of 2 September 2016

Alexandru Belevschi (born 21 March 1995) is a Moldovan footballer who plays as a defender.
