= Vadim Steklov =

Russian footballer

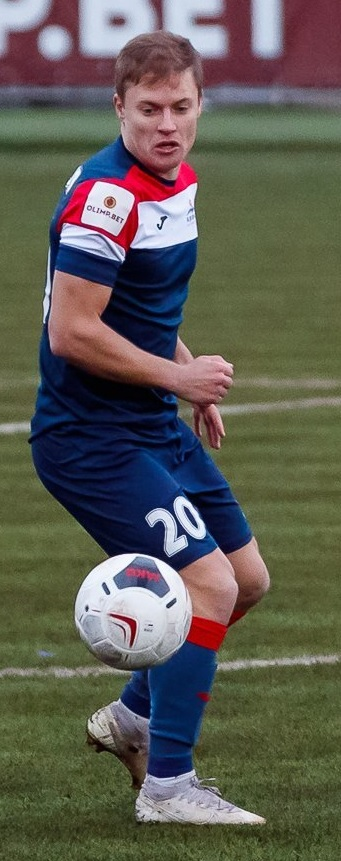
- Steklov with Irtysh Omsk in 2020

Personal information
- Full name: Vadim Aleksandrovich Steklov
- Date of birth: 24 March 1985 (age 41)
- Place of birth: Moscow, Russian SFSR
- Height: 1.75 m (5 ft 9 in)
- Position: Midfielder

Senior career*
Years	Team	Apps	(Gls)
2005–2007	FC Nika Moscow	74	(6)
2008	FC Lukhovitsy	33	(1)
2009	FC Istra	33	(6)
2010	FC Nika Moscow	0	(0)
2010	→ FC Torpedo Moscow (loan)	29	(4)
2011–2015	FC Torpedo Moscow	128	(2)
2015–2018	FC Arsenal Tula	56	(4)
2017–2018	→ FC Yenisey Krasnoyarsk (loan)	18	(0)
2018–2019	FC Avangard Kursk	31	(3)
2019–2020	FC Luch Vladivostok	24	(2)
2020–2021	FC Irtysh Omsk	32	(0)
2021–2022	FC Tekstilshchik Ivanovo	32	(1)
- * Club domestic league appearances and goals

Vadim Aleksandrovich Steklov (Russian: Вадим Александрович Стеклов; born 24 March 1985) is a Russian former professional football player who played as a defensive midfielder or centre midfielder.

== Club career ==
He made his Russian Premier League debut for FC Torpedo Moscow on 2 August 2014 in a game against PFC CSKA Moscow.
