= Ivan Knyazev =

Russian footballer

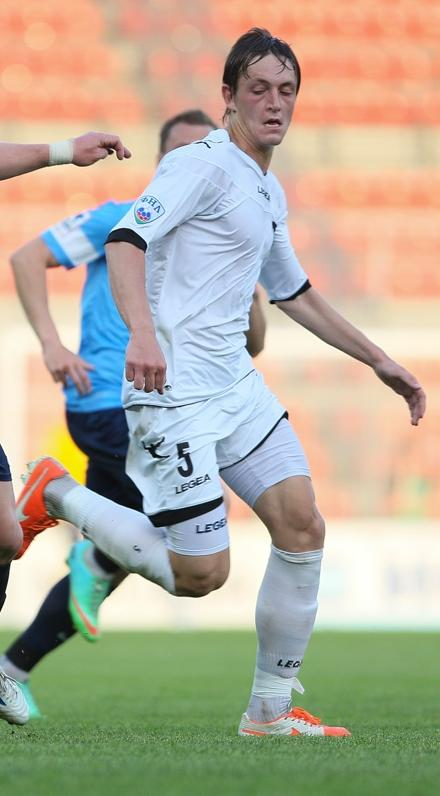
- Knyazev with Torpedo in 2014

Personal information
- Full name: Ivan Yevgenyevich Knyazev
- Date of birth: 5 November 1992 (age 34)
- Place of birth: Nefteyugansk, Russia
- Height: 1.88 m (6 ft 2 in)
- Position: Centre back

Youth career
- FC Lokomotiv Moscow

Senior career*
Years	Team	Apps	(Gls)
2011–2012	FC Kuban Krasnodar	0	(0)
2013–2015	FC Torpedo Moscow	27	(0)
2015–2016	FC Ural Yekaterinburg	0	(0)
2016	→ Riga FC (loan)	18	(1)
2017	FC Kubanskaya Korona Shevchenko		
2018	FK Valmiera	2	(0)
2019	FC Zugdidi	4	(0)
2019–2020	FC Irtysh Omsk	11	(0)
2020–2021	FC Zvezda Perm	13	(1)
- * Club domestic league appearances and goals

Ivan Yevgenyevich Knyazev (Russian: Иван Евгеньевич Князев; born 5 November 1992) is a Russian former football defender.

== Career ==
Knyazev made his debut in the Russian National Football League for Torpedo Moscow on 12 March 2013 in a game against Yenisey Krasnoyarsk. He made his Russian Premier League debut for Torpedo on 16 August 2014 in a game against FC Ural Yekaterinburg.

On 15 March 2021, it was reported that FIFA opened an investigation into Knyazev on suspicion of violating anti-doping rules in 2013. On 18 July 2021, he received a two-year ban from playing from FIFA.
