= FC Zorky Krasnogorsk (men) =

Russian football club

Zorky Krasnogorsk
- Full name: Football Club Zorky Krasnogorsk
- Nicknames: yellow-blue, hawks
- Founded: 1928 (Under the name Zorkiy in 1966)
- Ground: Zorky Stadium
- Capacity: 8,000
- Chairman: Aleksei Alekseyev
- Manager: Denis Lopatin
- League: Russian Amateur Football League
- 2024: Russian Second League, Division B, Group 2, 7th (relegated)
- Website: https://fczorky.ru/

FC Zorky Krasnogorsk (Russian: ФК «Зоркий» Красногорск) is a Russian football team based in Krasnogorsk. It was founded in 1928, and received its current name in 1966.

Due to the lack of legal documents indicating the exact date of the club's foundation, its history has to be reconstructed using newspaper articles and oral traditions. The pre-revolutionary history of football in the territory of the future Krasnogorsk region begins with small tournaments, which were popularly called "dacha". In reality, these competitions were held between teams from settlements that had stations on the Vindavskaya railway. In the magazine "Russian Sport" you can find periodic reports dedicated to the games of these teams:

09/08/1913 Magazine "Russian Sport": A match between the teams of Nakhabino and Novaya Derevnya took place on the Vindavskaya railway. Quite a lively struggle ended with the victory of the first team with a score of 3:1. The following played for Nakhabino: goalkeeper – E. Stklyankin, backs – V. Stklyankin, Zavyalov, halfbacks – Modin, Shestoperov P., Permsky P., forwards – Rudakov, Meshchaninov, Orlov, Andreev and Permsky I. S.S. Permsky refereed.

06/29/1914 Magazine "Russian Sport": Country football. League of the Vindavskaya railway. The championship began on June 22. The winners were: Nakhabino against Pavshino 6:0, Opalikha against Ban'ka 9:0, Dedovo against the team "Trud" 2:0.

The further round of sports life was interrupted by the revolution, but after some time (namely, in 1932) the Krasnogorsk region was formed, in which new sports tournaments of a local nature began to be held. The leading football position in the city was taken by the club of the local optical plant (it moved to the empty workshops of the Polyakov weaving factory in 1927), which later received the name "KMZ". Based on the modest materials of the "Patriot" museum of JSC KMZ, based on the recollections of Krasnogorsk regional historian and journalist L.V. Veselovsky, it follows that the plant team appeared in 1928. Among the first local football players, a city resident names Fyodor Chernikov, Platon Efremov, Nikolai Sokrutin, Nikolai Savelyev. "People flocked to football matches in droves," testified L.V. Veselovsky, "the stadium could not accommodate everyone who wanted to. Many people even came to the team's training. The players and their wives, who were almost always present at the matches, were probably known in the city not only by football fans. There has never been such a rise in interest in football in Krasnogorsk." The first successes of the KMZ club were marked in 1947 and 1948, when the Moscow Region Cups were won.

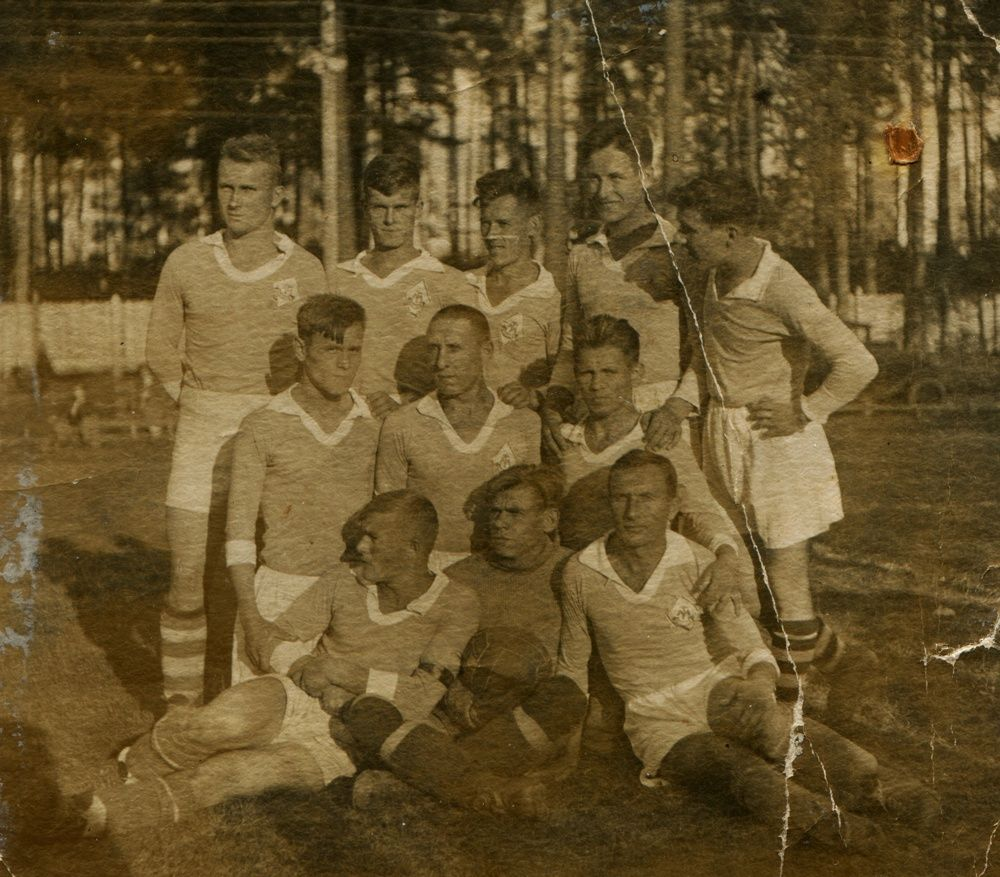
The 1937 Krasnogorsk squad

09/04/1949 The newspaper "Put k Pobede" (Mytishchi): "On September 2, at the stadium of the Wagon-Building Plant, a semi-final match for the Moscow Region Cup was held between the Krasnogorsk team and the home team. The game was played with a clear advantage of the Krasnogorsk team and ended with a score of 3:2 in their favor."

09/26/1956 The newspaper "Krasnogorsk Worker": "The Moscow Region Cup for men's teams was established by the Committee for Physical Culture and Sports under the Executive Committee of the Moscow Regional Council back in 1944 and has been played annually since then. Twice - in 1948 and in 1949 - it was won by Krasnogorsk football players. Everyone was worried about the question: will the Krasnogorsk team be able to emerge victorious this time too. The first half of the tense game brought no success to either the home team or the guests. The teams retired for a break with a draw - 0:0. After the break, the game became more intense. At first, the Krasnogorsk team took the initiative, repeatedly breaking through to the guests' goal. However, they were unable to make the final strike. Then the pressure of the Zagorsk football players noticeably increased, forcing the goalkeeper and defense of the Krasnogorsk team to work hard. One of the visitors' attacks ended with a goal. And shortly before the end of the match, the guests managed to score another goal into the home team's net. An interesting meeting ended with a victory for the Zagorsk football players with a score of 2:0. After the match, in a solemn atmosphere, the Moscow Region Cup was awarded to the Zagorsk football team. The Krasnogorsk Mechanical Plant football players were awarded a 2nd degree diploma of the Moscow Regional Committee for Physical Culture and Sports."

New successes came to the club in 1955, when the Krasnogorsk team won the Moscow Regional Council of Trade Unions Cup. The Krasnogorsk Worker newspaper from 14.10.1955: "The Cup goes to the Krasnogorsk football players. For almost two months, all the football teams of the cities and districts of the Moscow Region competed in a tense sporting struggle for the right to the Moscow Regional Council of Trade Unions Cup. On October 12, the Krasnogorsk team held their last decisive match with the Krasnopolyansky District football team at the city stadium. The stadium looked festive that day. A brass band played in the stands filled with spectators. More than 5 thousand Krasnogorsk residents - football fans - were impatiently awaiting the start of the match. At the referee's whistle, the football teams enter the center of the field. Children present bouquets of flowers to all the football players. The athletes accept the flowers and, running up to the stands, pass them on to the spectators. The referee whistles again, and the ball is in play. The home team attacks the visitors' goal in unison and often creates dangerous moments in their goal area. However, the score is opened only in the 25th minute. The first goal is scored by Krasnogorsk forward Boris Borisenko. Trying to even the score, the visitors play with utmost effort and soon score a return goal. The score becomes 1:1. Neither team manages to change the tie until the end of the game. According to the terms of the cup competition, the football players are given another 30 minutes of extra time, but even this does not change the outcome of the game. Only by putting in great effort and showing the will to win, the home team literally in the last minutes send another goal into the Krasnopolyansk goal. This goal, which decided the outcome of the final match, is scored by Krasnogorsk forward Vladimir Likharev. Thus, the Moscow Regional Council of Trade Unions Cup was deservedly won by the football players of the Krasnogorsk Mechanical Plant with a score of 2:1."

In 1964, the KMZ team won the second group of the Moscow Region Championship. In 1966, together with the plant's bandy team (bandy club), the football team also received the name "Zorky". In 1968-1969, the team representing the Krasnogorsk Mechanical Plant sports club played in Class "B" of the USSR Championship (the third strongest division), 9th zone. In 1979, Zorky won the Mosoblprof Cup for the second time in its existence and took the All-Union Central Council of Trade Unions trophy for the first time, and did it again in 1980. In the same 1980, the Krasnogorsk team won the main championship of the Moscow Region, and a year later they became champions again. In 1982-1989, the club started in the Second League of the USSR Championship (also the third strongest division), 1st zone. In 1984, it won the zonal tournament and the final of the RSFSR, but in the final 2 took 3rd place out of three teams and did not receive promotion in the class.

In 1992-1993, the team played in the Russian Championship among KFK (LFK), zone "Center A". In 2003, a new club was created with the same name. From 2003 to 2017, it played in the LFL / III division (Russian Championship among LFK; name in 2016 - "KSDYUSSHOR-Zorky", in 2017 - "KSSHOR-Zorky"). In 2008, it took 2nd place in the "Moscow Region" zone (group "A"), in 2007 and 2009 - 3rd. Currently, the club plays in the fourth division of Russia (Moscow Region Championship, League A).
