= Tomas Mikuckis =

Lithuanian footballer

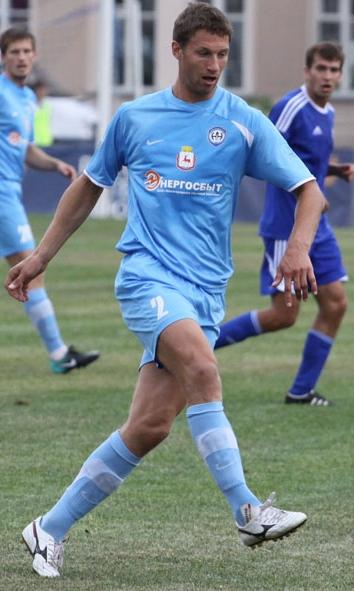

Personal information
- Date of birth: 13 January 1983 (age 43)
- Place of birth: Jonava, Lithuanian SSR, Soviet Union
- Height: 1.84 m (6 ft 0 in)
- Position: Defender

Senior career*
Years	Team	Apps	(Gls)
2002–2005	FK Žalgiris Vilnius	75	(4)
2006–2008	FK Sūduva Marijampolė	91	(5)
2009	FK Vėtra	10	(2)
2010–2012	FC Nizhny Novgorod	81	(4)
2012–2013	FC SKA-Energiya Khabarovsk	30	(2)
2013–2015	FC Torpedo Moscow	34	(4)
2015–2017	FC SKA-Khabarovsk	51	(1)
2017–2018	FC Tom Tomsk	31	(1)
2018	FK Spartaks Jūrmala	6	(0)
2019	FK Kauno Žalgiris	14	(1)

International career
2003–2018	Lithuania	22	(0)
- * Club domestic league appearances and goals

Tomas Mikuckis (born 13 January 1983) is a Lithuanian former professional football player.

== Career ==
Career started in FK Žalgiris. In 2006 became member of FK Sūduva.

Played in Russia, 2018 in Latvia.

On 7 January 2019 became a member of FK Kauno Žalgiris.

Also member of Lithuanian national team.
