= 2012–13 FC Mordovia Saransk season =

Mordovia Saransk
2012–13 season
- Chairman: Nikolay Levin
- Manager: Fyodor Shcherbachenko until 19 November 2012; Vladimir Bibikov(caretaker); 19 November – 28 December 2012; Dorinel Munteanu from 28 December 2012
- Stadium: Start Stadium
- Russian Premier League: 15th (Relegated)
- Russian Cup: Round of 16 vs Zenit St. Petersburg
- Top goalscorer: League: Ruslan Mukhametshin (11); All: Ruslan Mukhametshin (11)
- Highest home attendance: 12,000 vs CSKA Moscow; 19 August 2012
- Lowest home attendance: 2,500 vs Amkar Perm; 3 December 2012
- Average home league attendance: 7,023
Home colours	Away colours

The 2012–13 Mordovia Saransk season was their 1st season back in the Russian Premier League, the highest tier of association football in Russia. They finished the season in 15th place, meaning they were relegated back to the Russian National Football League after only one season in the Premier League. Mordovia also participated in the 2012–13 Russian Cup, getting knocked out at the Round of 16 stage by Zenit St. Petersburg.

== Squad ==
Note: Flags indicate national team as defined under FIFA eligibility rules; some limited exceptions apply. Players may hold more than one non-FIFA nationality.

No.	Pos.	Nation	Player
1	GK	RUS	Dmitri Abakumov
2	DF	RUS	Maksim Budnikov
4	MF	RUS	Yuri Kuleshov
7	MF	RUS	Anton Bober
8	FW	RUS	Kirill Panchenko
9	FW	RUS	Rustem Mukhametshin
10	MF	RUS	Evgeni Aldonin (on loan from CSKA)
11	MF	RUS	Maksim Rogov
12	DF	MNE	Vladimir Božović
13	FW	RUS	Mikhail Markin
14	DF	BLR	Igor Shitov (on loan from Dynamo Moscow)
17	FW	SLO	Dalibor Volaš
18	DF	UKR	Pavlo Stepanets

No.	Pos.	Nation	Player
19	DF	RUS	Yevgeni Osipov
20	MF	CRO	Tomislav Dujmović (on loan from Dynamo Moscow)
22	MF	RUS	Sergey Kuznetsov
23	FW	RUS	Ruslan Mukhametshin
24	MF	RUS	Andrei Pazin
27	MF	RUS	Aleksei Ivanov
31	GK	RUS	David Yurchenko
32	FW	ROU	Daniel Oprița
33	GK	RUS	Denis Shebanov
35	DF	GEO	Akaki Khubutia
40	DF	SRB	Milan Perendija
73	MF	RUS	Maksim Terentyev
93	MF	RUS	Denis Sobolev

=== Youth squad ===
Note: Flags indicate national team as defined under FIFA eligibility rules; some limited exceptions apply. Players may hold more than one non-FIFA nationality.

No.	Pos.	Nation	Player
25	DF	RUS	Pavel Orlov
29	MF	RUS	Pavel Afanasyev
41	MF	RUS	Nikita Kudryashov
44	DF	RUS	Ilya Zakharov
45	FW	RUS	Nikita Rokunov
46	DF	RUS	Aleksei Chubukin
48	FW	RUS	Andon Malanyin
49	MF	RUS	Timon Abbakumov
50	MF	RUS	Aleksandr Strokov

No.	Pos.	Nation	Player
51	MF	RUS	Igor Krutov
52	DF	ARM	Eduard Tatoyan
55	MF	RUS	Vladimir Barmin
57	DF	RUS	Radik Yusupov
71	MF	RUS	Alen Askerov
78	MF	RUS	Yevgeni Tribushinin
88	FW	RUS	Ivan Filyaev
95	GK	RUS	Roman Kalyuzhny
99	MF	RUS	Anton Sobolev

== Transfers ==
=== Summer ===
In: Note: Flags indicate national team as defined under FIFA eligibility rules; some limited exceptions apply. Players may hold more than one non-FIFA nationality.

No.	Pos.	Nation	Player
1	GK	RUS	Dmitry Abakumov (from (Russia) KAMAZ Naberezhnye Chelny)
5	MF	RUS	Roman Kontsedalov (on loan from (Russia) Spartak Nalchik)
7	MF	RUS	Anton Bobyor (from (Russia) Krylia Sovetov Samara)
17	FW	SLO	Dalibor Volaš (from (Moldova) Sheriff Tiraspol, previously on loan to (Slovenia) Maribor)
20	MF	CRO	Tomislav Dujmović (on loan from (Russia) Dynamo Moscow, previously on loan to (Spain) Real Zaragoza)
22	MF	RUS	Evgeni Aldonin (on loan from (Russia) CSKA Moscow)
27	MF	RUS	Aleksei Ivanov (from (Russia) Anzhi Makhachkala)

Out: Note: Flags indicate national team as defined under FIFA eligibility rules; some limited exceptions apply. Players may hold more than one non-FIFA nationality.

No.	Pos.	Nation	Player
14	MF	CHI	Gerson Acevedo (to (Russia) Ural Sverdlovsk Oblast)
16	GK	RUS	Aleksandr Agapov (to (Russia) SKA-Energiya Khabarovsk)
32	MF	RUS	Andrei Gorbanets (to (Russia) Tom Tomsk, previously on loan from (Russia) Krasnodar)
45	FW	RUS	Aleksandr Minchenkov (end of loan from (Russia) Lokomotiv Moscow)
77	FW	RUS	Anatoli Gerk (to (Russia) Ural Sverdlovsk Oblast)

=== Winter ===
In: Note: Flags indicate national team as defined under FIFA eligibility rules; some limited exceptions apply. Players may hold more than one non-FIFA nationality.

No.	Pos.	Nation	Player
12	DF	MNE	Vladimir Božović (from (Romania) Rapid București)
32	FW	ROU	Daniel Oprița (from (Romania) Petrolul Ploiești)
35	DF	GEO	Akaki Khubutia (from (Romania) Gaz Metan Mediaș)
40	DF	SRB	Milan Perendija (from (Romania) Oţelul Galaţi)

Out: Note: Flags indicate national team as defined under FIFA eligibility rules; some limited exceptions apply. Players may hold more than one non-FIFA nationality.

No.	Pos.	Nation	Player
3	DF	RUS	Aleksei Muldarov (to (Kazakhstan) Aktobe)
5	MF	RUS	Roman Kontsedalov (loan return to (Russia) Spartak Nalchik)
87	DF	SRB	Aleksandar Simčević (to (Kazakhstan) FC Shakhter Karagandy)
—	FW	RUS	Maksim Zhestkov (to (Portugal) S.C. Braga)

== Competitions ==
=== Russian Premier League ===
==== Matches ====
20 July 2012 1	Mordovia Saransk	2 – 3	Lokomotiv Moscow	Saransk
19:00 MSK (UTC+4)	Panchenko 16'; Osipov 62'	Summary	Torbinski 29'; Ozdoyev 33'; Ćorluka 38'; Ozdoyev (red card) 87'	Stadium: Start Stadium; Attendance: 10,000; Referee: Mikhail Vilkov

27 July 2012 2	Kuban Krasnodar	1 – 0	Mordovia Saransk	Krasnodar, Krasnodar Krai
20:00 MSK (UTC+4)	Bucur 85'	Summary		Stadium: Kuban Stadium; Attendance: 16,820; Referee: Alexey Nikolaev

3 August 2012 3	Mordovia Saransk	3 – 0	Rostov	Saransk
19:00 MSK (UTC+4)	Osipov 10'; Dyakov 51'; Mukhametshin 90+3'	Summary		Stadium: Start Stadium; Attendance: 8,500; Referee: Evgeny Turbin

12 August 2012 4	Amkar Perm	0 – 0	Mordovia Saransk	Perm
15:00 MSK (UTC+4)		Summary		Stadium: Zvezda Stadium; Attendance: 8,300; Referee: Vasiliy Kazartsev

19 August 2012 5	Mordovia Saransk	0 – 3	CSKA Moscow	Saransk
18:30 MSK (UTC+4)		Summary	Tošić 30'; Dzagoev 41'; Cauņa 57'	Stadium: Start Stadium; Attendance: 12,000; Referee: Sergey Lapochkin

26 August 2012 6	Anzhi Makhachkala	4 – 2	Mordovia Saransk	Makhachkala, Dagestan
19:00 MSK (UTC+4)	Traore 14'; Dujmović 41' (o.g.); Eto'o 79', 81'	Summary	R. Mukhametshin 35'; Rogov 64'	Stadium: Dynamo Stadium; Attendance: 14,500; Referee: Timur Arslanbekov

31 August 2012 7	Mordovia Saransk	0 – 3	Zenit St. Petersburg	Saransk
19:00 MSK (UTC+4)		Summary	Zyryanov 25'; Kerzhakov 55', 63'	Stadium: Start Stadium; Attendance: 11,500; Referee: Evgeny Turbin

17 September 2012 8	Mordovia Saransk	2 – 3	Krylia Sovetov Samara	Saransk
19:30 MSK (UTC+4)	Osipov 31'; Bober 60'	Summary	Epureanu 27'; Nemov 83'; Grigoryan 90+1'	Stadium: Start Stadium; Attendance: 7,000; Referee: Aleksey Eskov

21 September 2012 9	Krasnodar	6 – 1	Mordovia Saransk	Krasnodar
19:00 MSK (UTC+4)	Movsisyan 5', 30'; Martynovich 38'; Anđelković 53'; Ignatyev 55'; Wánderson 90'	Summary	Bober 11'; Osipov (yellow card) 58' (yellow-red card) 81'	Stadium: Kuban Stadium; Attendance: 5,200; Referee: Sergey Kuznetsov

1 October 2012 10	Mordovia Saransk	1 – 1	Alania Vladikavkaz	Saransk
20:00 MSK (UTC+4)	Mukhametshin 38'	Summary	Neco 57'	Stadium: Start Stadium; Attendance: 4,000; Referee: Sergei Ivanov

6 October 2012 11	Volga Nizhny Novgorod	0 – 2	Mordovia Saransk	Nizhny Novgorod
16:30 MSK (UTC+4)		Summary	Ruslan Mukhametshin 11' (pen.); Panchenko 89'	Stadium: Lokomotiv Stadium; Attendance: 3,100; Referee: Sergey Karasev

20 October 2012 12	Mordovia Saransk	1 – 2	Dynamo Moscow	Saransk
17:45 MSK (UTC+4)	Mukhametshin 60' (pen.)	Summary	Kokorin 6', 63'	Stadium: Start Stadium; Attendance: 7,500; Referee: Vassili Kazartsev

27 October 2012 13	Spartak Moscow	2 – 0	Mordovia Saransk	Moscow
13:30 MSK (UTC+4)	Jurado 42'; Bilyaletdinov 65'			Stadium: Luzhniki Stadium; Attendance: 7,969; Referee: Sergei Ivanov

3 November 2012 14	Mordovia Saransk	1 – 3	Rubin Kazan	Saransk
18:00 MSK (UTC+4)	Panchenko 48'	Summary	Dyadyun 10', 75'; Rondón 90'	Stadium: Start Stadium; Attendance: 4,500; Referee: Sergey Lapochkin

10 November 2012 15	Terek Grozny	2 – 1	Mordovia Saransk	Grozny, Chechnya
16:00 MSK (UTC+4)	Legear 12'; Aílton 66'	Summary	Mukhametshin 90+1'	Stadium: Sultan Bilimkhanov Stadium; Attendance: 13,200; Referee: Timur Arslanbekov

18 November 2012 16	Mordovia Saransk	0 – 3	Kuban Krasnodar	Saransk
16:00 MSK (UTC+4)		Summary	Stepanets 18' (o.g.); Baldé 28'; Özbiliz 49'	Stadium: Start Stadium; Attendance: 4,000; Referee: Vladislav Bezborodov

23 November 2012 17	Rostov	2 – 0	Mordovia Saransk	Rostov, Rostov Oblast
19:00 MSK (UTC+4)	Dyakov 45' (pen.); Kirichenko 81'	Summary	Kontsedalov (red card) 75'	Stadium: Olimp - 2 Attendance: 5,500; Referee: Sergey Karasev

3 December 2012 18	Mordovia Saransk	1 – 1	Amkar Perm	Saransk
18:00 MSK (UTC+4)	Panchenko 85'	Summary	Picusceac 9'	Stadium: Start Stadium; Attendance: 2,500; Referee: Igor Nizovtsev

8 December 2012 19	CSKA Moscow	2 – 1	Mordovia Saransk	Moscow
16:00 MSK (UTC+4)	Honda 14'; Mamayev 71'	Summary	Bober 54'	Stadium: Luzhniki Stadium; Attendance: 5,801; Referee: Alexey Nikolaev

10 March 2013 20	Mordovia Saransk	2 – 0	Anzhi Makhachkala	Saransk
16:30 MSK (UTC+4)	Perendija 3'; R.Mukhametshin 73'	Summary		Stadium: Start Stadium; Attendance: 5,896; Referee: Sergey Karasev

17 March 2013 21	Zenit St. Petersburg	1 – 0	Mordovia Saransk	Saint Petersburg
20:15 MSK (UTC+4)	Hulk 55'	Summary	Božović (yellow card) 41' (yellow-red card) 62'	Stadium: Petrovsky Stadium; Attendance: 16,876; Referee: Vlafimar Kazmenko

30 March 2013 22	Krylia Sovetov Samara	0 – 2	Mordovia Saransk	Samara
16:00 MSK (UTC+4)		Summary	Oprița 28'; Ruslan Mukhametshin 44'; Stepanets (yellow card) 60' (yellow-red card) 75'	Stadium: Metallurg Stadion; Attendance: 16,784; Referee: Mikhail Vilkov

8 April 2013 23	Mordovia Saransk	0 – 0	Krasnodar	Saransk
20:00 MSK (UTC+4)		Summary		Stadium: Start Stadium; Attendance: 7,300; Referee: Igor Nizovtsev

15 April 2013 24	Alania Vladikavkaz	3 – 1	Mordovia Saransk	Vladikavkaz
18:00 MSK (UTC+4)	Drenthe 10' (pen.), 44', 89'; Gabulov (red card) 90+10'	Summary	Mukhametshin 49'; Perendija (red card) 90+10'	Stadium: Republican Spartak Stadium; Attendance: 10,200; Referee: Vitali Meshkov

20 April 2013 25	Mordovia Saransk	1 – 3	Volga Nizhny Novgorod	Saransk
13:30 MSK (UTC+4)	Ruslan Mukhametshin 40'	Summary	Sapogov 79' (pen.); Belozyorov 83'; Sarkisov 86'	Stadium: Start Stadium; Attendance: 4,000; Referee: Sergey Kostevich

27 April 2013 26	Dynamo Moscow	3 – 1	Mordovia Saransk	Moscow
13:30 MSK (UTC+4)	Yusupov 4'; Kurányi 24', 36'	Summary	Panchenko 28'	Stadium: Arena Khimki; Attendance: 5,124; Referee: Vladislav Bezborodov

4 May 2013 27	Mordovia Saransk	2 – 1	Spartak Moscow	Saransk
MSK (UTC+4)	Pazin 49'; Oprița 70'	Summary	McGeady 6'	Stadium: Start Stadium; Attendance: 11,565; Referee: Sergei Ivanov

10 May 2013 28	Rubin Kazan	2 – 1	Mordovia Saransk	Kazan, Tatarstan
17:30 MSK (UTC+4)	Karadeniz 7'; Dyadyun 75'	Summary	Mukhametshin 40'	Stadium: Tsentralnyi Stadion; Attendance: 6,989; Referee: Timur Arslanbekov

18 May 2013 29	Mordovia Saransk	1 – 1	Terek Grozny	Saransk
17:00 MSK (UTC+4)	R.Mukhametshin 57'	Summary	Mitrishev 73'	Stadium: Start Stadium; Attendance: 5,500; Referee: Vladimir Kazmenko

26 May 2013 30	Lokomotiv Moscow	2 – 1	Mordovia Saransk	Moscow
13:30 MSK (UTC+4)	Samedov 17' (pen.); N'Doye 23'	Summary	Pazin 90'	Stadium: Lokomotiv Stadium; Attendance: 6,107; Referee: Sergey Karasev

==== League table ====
Pos	Team	Pld	W	D	L	GF	GA	GD	Pts	Qualification or relegation
12	Volga Nizhny Novgorod	30	7	8	15	28	46	−18	29 (Note: Amkar Perm ahead of Volga Nizhny Novgorod and Rostov on head-to-head points; Amkar Perm: 7 pts, Volga Nizhny Novgorod: 5 pts, Rostov: 4 pts.)	
13	Rostov (O)	30	7	8	15	30	41	−11	29	Qualification for the Relegation play-offs
14	Krylia Sovetov Samara (O)	30	7	7	16	31	52	−21	28	Qualification for the Relegation play-offs
15	Mordovia Saransk (R)	30	5	5	20	30	57	−27	20	Relegation to Football National League
16	Alania Vladikavkaz (R)	30	4	7	19	26	53	−27	19	Relegation to Football National League

Source: Russian Premier League
Rules for classification: 1) points; 2) number of wins; 3) head-to-head points; 4) number of head-to-head wins; 5) head-to-head goal difference; 6) number of head-to-head goals scored; 7) number of head-to-head away goals scored; 8) goal difference; 9) number of goals scored; 10) number of away goals scored; 11) position in the 2011–12 season (only used until all the regularly scheduled games have been played); 11) extra play-off game or tournament between the teams in question.
(O) Play-off winners; (R) Relegated

=== Russian Cup ===
26 September 2012 Round of 32	Lokomotiv-2 Moscow	0 – 1	Mordovia Saransk	Moscow
16:00 MSK (UTC+4)		[ Summary]	Ivanov 71'	Stadium: Lokomotiv Perovo; Attendance: 500; Referee: Sergei Kostevich

30 October 2012 Round of 16	Mordovia Saransk	0 – 2	Zenit St. Petersburg	Saransk
17:00 MSK (UTC+4)		Summary	Semak 66'; Criscito 90+1'	Stadium: Start Stadium; Attendance: 4,500; Referee: Aleksey Eskov

== Squad statistics ==
=== Appearances and goals ===
No.	Pos	Nat	Player	Total		Premier League		Russian Cup	
No.	Pos	Nat	Player	Apps	Goals	Apps	Goals	Apps	Goals
1	GK	(Russia) RUS	Dmitri Abakumov	12	0	10+0	0	2+0	0
2	DF	(Russia) RUS	Maksim Budnikov	5	0	2+3	0	0+0	0
4	MF	(Russia) RUS	Yuri Kuleshov	25	0	19+4	0	1+1	0
5	MF	(Russia) RUS	Roman Kontsedalov	9	0	3+5	0	1+0	0
7	MF	(Russia) RUS	Anton Bober	27	3	14+12	3	1+0	0
8	FW	(Russia) RUS	Kirill Panchenko	29	5	19+9	5	1+0	0
9	FW	(Russia) RUS	Rustem Mukhametshin	26	1	9+15	1	1+1	0
10	MF	(Russia) RUS	Evgeni Aldonin	22	0	20+1	0	1+0	0
11	MF	(Russia) RUS	Maksim Rogov	16	1	10+4	1	2+0	0
12	DF	(Montenegro) MNE	Vladimir Božović	10	0	10+0	0	0+0	0
13	FW	(Russia) RUS	Mikhail Markin	8	0	0+7	0	0+1	0
14	DF	(Belarus) BLR	Igor Shitov	21	0	20+0	0	1+0	0
17	FW	(Slovenia) SLO	Dalibor Volaš	7	0	0+7	0	0+0	0
18	DF	(Ukraine) UKR	Pavlo Stepanets	20	0	17+1	0	2+0	0
19	DF	(Russia) RUS	Yevgeni Osipov	21	3	18+2	3	1+0	0
20	MF	(Croatia) CRO	Tomislav Dujmović	26	0	22+3	0	1+0	0
22	MF	(Russia) RUS	Sergey Kuznetsov	4	0	1+2	0	1+0	0
23	FW	(Russia) RUS	Ruslan Mukhametshin	32	11	27+3	11	1+1	0
24	MF	(Russia) RUS	Andrei Pazin	13	2	10+2	2	0+1	0
27	MF	(Russia) RUS	Aleksei Ivanov	20	1	17+1	0	1+1	1
31	GK	(Russia) RUS	David Yurchenko	21	0	20+1	0	0+0	0
32	FW	(Romania) ROU	Daniel Oprița	11	2	10+1	2	0+0	0
35	DF	(Georgia (country)) GEO	Akaki Khubutia	11	0	11+0	0	0+0	0
40	DF	(Serbia) SRB	Milan Perendija	7	1	7+0	1	0+0	0
73	MF	(Russia) RUS	Maksim Terentyev	1	0	0+1	0	0+0	0
Players away from the club on loan:
6	DF	(Russia) RUS	Vladimir Ponomaryov	1	0	1+0	0	0+0	0
Players who appeared for Mordovia Saransk no longer at the club:
3	DF	(Russia) RUS	Aleksei Muldarov	20	0	18+0	0	2+0	0
87	DF	(Serbia) SRB	Aleksandar Simčević	18	0	15+1	0	2+0	0

=== Top scorers ===
Place	Position	Nation	Number	Name	Russian Premier League	Russian Cup	Total
1	FW	(Russia)	23	Ruslan Mukhametshin	11	0	11
2	FW	(Russia)	8	Kirill Panchenko	5	0	5
3	DF	(Russia)	19	Yevgeni Osipov	3	0	3
3	MF	(Russia)	7	Anton Bober	3	0	3
5	MF	(Russia)	24	Andrei Pazin	2	0	2
5	FW	(Romania)	32	Daniel Oprița	2	0	2
7	MF	(Russia)	11	Maksim Rogov	1	0	1
7	FW	(Russia)	9	Rustem Mukhametshin	1	0	1
7	DF	(Serbia)	40	Milan Perendija	1	0	1
7	MF	(Russia)	27	Aleksei Ivanov	0	1	1
				TOTALS	30	1	31

=== Disciplinary record ===
Number	Nation	Position	Name	Russian Premier League		Russian Cup		Total	
Number	Nation	Position	Name	Yellow card	Red card	Yellow card	Red card	Yellow card	Red card
2	(Russia)	DF	Maksim Budnikov	1	0	0	0	1	0
3	(Russia)	DF	Aleksei Muldarov	4	0	0	0	4	0
4	(Russia)	MF	Yuri Kuleshov	3	0	0	0	3	0
5	(Russia)	MF	Roman Kontsedalov	0	1	1	0	1	1
7	(Russia)	MF	Anton Bober	1	0	0	0	1	0
9	(Russia)	FW	Rustem Mukhametshin	2	0	0	0	2	0
10	(Russia)	MF	Evgeni Aldonin	5	0	0	0	5	0
11	(Russia)	MF	Maksim Rogov	1	0	1	0	2	0
12	(Montenegro)	DF	Vladimir Božović	5	1	0	0	5	1
13	(Russia)	FW	Mikhail Markin	1	0	0	0	1	0
14	(Belarus)	DF	Igor Shitov	5	0	1	0	6	0
18	(Ukraine)	DF	Pavlo Stepanets	4	1	1	0	5	1
19	(Russia)	DF	Yevgeni Osipov	7	1	0	0	7	1
20	(Croatia)	MF	Tomislav Dujmović	8	0	0	0	8	0
23	(Russia)	FW	Ruslan Mukhametshin	1	0	0	0	1	0
24	(Russia)	MF	Andrei Pazin	2	0	0	0	2	0
27	(Russia)	MF	Aleksei Ivanov	1	0	0	0	1	0
31	(Russia)	GK	David Yurchenko	2	0	0	0	2	0
35	(Georgia (country))	DF	Akaki Khubutia	2	0	0	0	2	0
40	(Serbia)	DF	Milan Perendija	1	1	0	0	1	1
87	(Serbia)	DF	Aleksandar Simčević	4	0	0	0	4	0
			TOTALS	60	5	4	0	64	5
