= 2015–16 PFC CSKA Moscow season =

CSKA
2015–16 season
- Chairman: Yevgeni Giner
- Manager: Leonid Slutsky
- Stadium: Arena Khimki
- Premier League: 1st
- Russian Cup: Runners-up
- Champions League: Group stage
- Top goalscorer: League: Ahmed Musa (13); All: Ahmed Musa (18)
- Highest home attendance: 18,456 vs Manchester United (21 October 2015)
- Lowest home attendance: 3,000 vs Ural (28 October 2015)
- Average home league attendance: 10,467 (16 May 2016)
| Home colours | Away colours |

The 2015–16 CSKA season was the 24th successive season that the club will play in the Russian Premier League, the highest tier of association football in Russia. CSKA will also take part in the Russian Cup and Champions League, entering at the third qualifying round.

== Squad ==
As of match played 21 May 2016

| Number | Name | Nationality | Position | Date of birth (age) | Signed from | Signed in | Contract ends | Apps. | Goals |
Goalkeepers
| 1 | Sergei Chepchugov | (Russia) | GK | 15 July 1985 (aged 30) | Sibir Novosibirsk | 2010 | | 26 | 0 |
| 35 | Igor Akinfeev (captain) | (Russia) | GK | 8 April 1986 (aged 30) | Academy | 2003 | 2019 | 484 | 0 |
| 44 | Georgi Kyrnats | (Russia) | GK | 22 June 1998 (aged 17) | Academy | 2015 | | 0 | 0 |
| 45 | Ilya Pomazun | (Russia) | GK | 16 August 1996 (aged 19) | Academy | 2012 | | 0 | 0 |
| 77 | Dmitri Gerasimov | (Russia) | GK | 16 February 1999 (aged 17) | Academy | 2015 | | 0 | 0 |
| 84 | Pavel Ovchinnikov | (Russia) | GK | 24 March 1998 (aged 18) | Academy | 2015 | | 0 | 0 |
Defenders
| 2 | Mário Fernandes | (Brazil) | DF | 19 September 1990 (aged 25) | Grêmio | 2012 | 2017 | 128 | 2 |
| 4 | Sergei Ignashevich | (Russia) | DF | 14 July 1979 (aged 36) | Lokomotiv Moscow | 2004 | | 475 | 39 |
| 5 | Viktor Vasin | (Russia) | DF | 6 October 1988 (aged 27) | Spartak Nalchik | 2011 | | 15 | 0 |
| 6 | Aleksei Berezutski | (Russia) | DF | 20 June 1982 (aged 33) | Chernomorets Novorossiysk | 2001 | | 447 | 9 |
| 14 | Kirill Nababkin | (Russia) | DF | 8 September 1986 (aged 29) | Moscow | 2010 | | 163 | 3 |
| 24 | Vasili Berezutski | (Russia) | DF | 20 June 1982 (aged 33) | Torpedo-ZIL | 2002 | | 459 | 12 |
| 37 | Denis Masyutin | (Russia) | DF | 9 July 1995 (aged 20) | Academy | 2012 | | 0 | 0 |
| 42 | Georgi Shchennikov | (Russia) | DF | 27 April 1991 (aged 25) | Academy | 2008 | | 219 | 1 |
| 55 | Mutalip Alibekov | (Russia) | DF | 18 June 1997 (aged 18) | Academy | 2014 | | 0 | 0 |
| 58 | Anatolie Nikolaesh | (Russia) | DF | 17 April 1996 (aged 20) | Academy | 2014 | | 0 | 0 |
| 59 | Roman Krivulkin | (Russia) | DF | 18 February 1996 (aged 20) | Zenit St.Petersburg | 2015 | | 0 | 0 |
| 62 | Aleksandar Stanisavljević | (Serbia) | DF | 27 January 1998 (aged 18) | Academy | 2015 | | 0 | 0 |
| 78 | Ivan Maklakov | (Russia) | DF | 17 April 1998 (aged 18) | Academy | 2015 | | 0 | 0 |
Midfielder
| 3 | Pontus Wernbloom | (Sweden) | MF | 25 June 1986 (aged 29) | AZ Alkmaar | 2012 | 2016 | 153 | 13 |
| 7 | Zoran Tošić | (Serbia) | MF | 28 April 1987 (aged 29) | Manchester United | 2010 | 2015 | 214 | 46 |
| 10 | Alan Dzagoev | (Russia) | MF | 17 June 1990 (aged 25) | Krylia Sovetov-SOK Dimitrovgrad | 2008 | | 276 | 63 |
| 15 | Roman Shirokov | (Russia) | MF | 6 July 1981 (aged 34) | Spartak Moscow | 2016 | 2016 | 9 | 1 |
| 17 | Sergei Tkachyov | (Russia) | MF | 19 May 1989 (aged 27) | Kuban Krasnodar | 2016 | 2019 | 11 | 0 |
| 19 | Aleksandrs Cauņa | (Latvia) | MF | 19 January 1988 (aged 28) | Skonto Riga | 2011 | 2016 | 83 | 6 |
| 20 | Amir Natkho | (Russia) | MF | 5 July 1996 (aged 19) | Barcelona Juvenil A | 2015 | | 2 | 0 |
| 25 | Roman Eremenko | (Finland) | MF | 19 March 1987 (aged 29) | Rubin Kazan | 2013 | | 68 | 16 |
| 49 | Nikita Titov | (Russia) | MF | 14 March 1996 (aged 20) | Academy | 2014 | | 0 | 0 |
| 51 | Aleksandr Ektov | (Russia) | MF | 30 January 1996 (aged 20) | Academy | 2015 | | 0 | 0 |
| 52 | Khetag Khosonov | (Russia) | MF | 18 June 1998 (aged 17) | Yunost Vladikavkaz | 2014 | | 0 | 0 |
| 60 | Aleksandr Golovin | (Russia) | MF | 30 May 1996 (aged 19) | Academy | 2014 | | 33 | 3 |
| 61 | Kirill Leonov | (Russia) | MF | 26 July 1998 (aged 17) | Academy | 2015 | | 0 | 0 |
| 64 | Timur Pukhov | (Russia) | MF | 17 June 1998 (aged 17) | Academy | 2015 | | 0 | 0 |
| 65 | Mikhail Solovyov | (Russia) | FW | 7 April 1997 (aged 19) | Academy | 2014 | | 0 | 0 |
| 66 | Bibras Natcho | (Israel) | MF | 18 February 1988 (aged 28) | Rubin Kazan | 2013 | | 64 | 15 |
| 67 | Denis Glukhov | (Russia) | MF | 5 January 1997 (aged 19) | Academy | 2014 | | 0 | 0 |
| 72 | Astemir Gordyushenko | (Russia) | MF | 30 March 1997 (aged 19) | Academy | 2014 | | 0 | 0 |
| 73 | Dmitri Sokolov | (Russia) | MF | 9 January 1997 (aged 19) | Academy | 2014 | | 0 | 0 |
| 74 | Savva Knyazev | (Russia) | MF | 9 September 1997 (aged 18) | Academy | 2014 | | 0 | 0 |
| 82 | Ivan Oleynikov | (Russia) | MF | 24 August 1998 (aged 17) | Academy | 2015 | | 0 | 0 |
| 89 | Konstantin Kuchayev | (Russia) | MF | 10 March 1998 (aged 18) | Academy | 2015 | | 0 | 0 |
| 96 | Renat Yusupov | (Russia) | MF | 11 March 1998 (aged 18) | Academy | 2015 | | 0 | 0 |
Forwards
| 8 | Kirill Panchenko | (Russia) | FW | 16 October 1989 (aged 26) | Tom Tomsk | 2014 | 2019 | 41 | 5 |
| 18 | Ahmed Musa | (Nigeria) | FW | 13 August 1989 (aged 26) | VVV-Venlo | 2012 | 2017 | 168 | 54 |
| 46 | Nikolai Dergachyov | (Russia) | FW | 24 May 1994 (aged 21) | Saturn-2 | 2012 | | 1 | 0 |
| 63 | Fyodor Chalov | (Russia) | FW | 10 April 1998 (aged 18) | Academy | 2015 | | 0 | 0 |
| 68 | Nikita Kasatkin | (Russia) | FW | 16 February 1997 (aged 19) | Academy | 2014 | | 0 | 0 |
| 71 | Ilya Zuev | (Russia) | FW | 23 June 1998 (aged 17) | UOR Master-Saturn Egorjevsk | 2015 | | 0 | 0 |
| 75 | Timur Zhamaletdinov | (Russia) | FW | 21 May 1997 (aged 19) | Academy | 2014 | | 0 | 0 |
| 79 | Ilya Ferapontov | (Russia) | FW | 19 April 1997 (aged 19) | Academy | 2014 | | 0 | 0 |
| 99 | Aaron Samuel | (Nigeria) | FW | 4 June 1994 (aged 21) | loan from Guangzhou R&F | 2016 | 2016 | 10 | 3 |
Away on loan
| 11 | Vitinho | (Brazil) | FW | 21 October 1994 (aged 21) | Botafogo | 2013 | 2018 | 24 | 1 |
| 15 | Dmitry Yefremov | (Russia) | MF | 5 February 1994 (aged 22) | Akademiya Tolyatti | 2012 | | 34 | 0 |
| 17 | Alibek Aliev | (Sweden) | FW | 16 August 1996 (aged 19) | IF Elfsborg | 2015 | 2020 | 0 | 0 |
| 23 | Georgi Milanov | (Bulgaria) | MF | 19 January 1992 (aged 24) | Litex Lovech | 2013 | 2018 | 98 | 3 |
| 39 | Vyacheslav Karavayev | (Russia) | DF | 20 May 1995 (aged 21) | Academy | 2011 | | 4 | 0 |
| 43 | Aleksandr Makarov | (Russia) | FW | 24 April 1996 (aged 20) | Academy | 2014 | | 0 | 0 |
| 70 | Armen Ambartsumyan | (Russia) | MF | 11 April 1994 (aged 22) | Academy | 2010 | | 1 | 0 |
| 71 | Konstantin Bazelyuk | (Russia) | FW | 12 April 1993 (aged 23) | Academy | 2010 | | 27 | 4 |
| 91 | Nikita Chernov | (Russia) | DF | 14 January 1996 (aged 20) | Academy | 2014 | | 3 | 0 |
| 92 | Pyotr Ten | (Russia) | DF | 12 July 1992 (aged 23) | Academy | 2010 | | 1 | 0 |
| 97 | Carlos Strandberg | (Sweden) | FW | 14 April 1996 (aged 20) | BK Häcken | 2015 | 2020 | 13 | 3 |
Players that left during the season
| 88 | Seydou Doumbia | (Ivory Coast) | FW | 31 December 1987 (aged 28) | Roma | 2015 | 2016 | 150 | 95 |

=== Out on loan ===
Note: Flags indicate national team as defined under FIFA eligibility rules; some limited exceptions apply. Players may hold more than one non-FIFA nationality.

| No. | Pos. | Nation | Player |
|---|---|---|---|
| — | DF | RUS | Vyacheslav Karavayev (at Baumit Jablonec) |
| — | DF | RUS | Nikita Chernov (at Baltika Kaliningrad) |
| — | DF | RUS | Pyotr Ten (at Tom Tomsk) |
| — | MF | BRA | Vitinho (at Internacional) |
| — | MF | BUL | Georgi Milanov (at Grasshoppers) |

| No. | Pos. | Nation | Player |
|---|---|---|---|
| — | MF | RUS | Dmitri Yefremov (at Slovan Liberec) |
| — | FW | SWE | Alibek Aliev (at Jaro) |
| — | FW | RUS | Konstantin Bazelyuk (at Kuban Krasnodar) |
| — | FW | RUS | Aleksandr Makarov (at FC Baltika Kaliningrad) |
| — | FW | SWE | Carlos Strandberg (at AIK) |

== Transfers ==
=== In ===
| Date | Position | Nationality | Name | From | Fee | Ref. |
|---|---|---|---|---|---|---|
| 31 August 2015 | MF | (Russia) | Amir Natkho | Barcelona Juvenil A | Undisclosed | |
| 11 January 2016 | MF | (Russia) | Sergei Tkachyov | Kuban Krasnodar | Undisclosed | |
| 9 February 2016 | MF | (Russia) | Roman Shirokov | Spartak Moscow | Free | |

=== Out ===
| Date | Position | Nationality | Name | To | Fee | Ref. |
|---|---|---|---|---|---|---|
| 10 July 2015 | MF | (Russia) | Svyatoslav Georgiyevsky | Kuban Krasnodar | Undisclosed | |
| 11 July 2015 | GK | (Russia) | Sergei Revyakin | Torpedo Armavir | Undisclosed | |
| 12 August 2015 | MF | (Russia) | Elgyun Ulukhanov | Krasnodar | Undisclosed | |
| 1 September 2015 | MF | (Russia) | Maksim Martusevich | Javor Ivanjica | Undisclosed | |

=== Loans in ===
| Date from | Position | Nationality | Name | From | Date to | Ref. |
|---|---|---|---|---|---|---|
| 10 August 2015 | FW | (Ivory Coast) | Seydou Doumbia | A.S. Roma | | |
| 18 February 2016 | FW | (Nigeria) | Aaron Samuel | Guangzhou R&F | End of Season | |

=== Loans out ===
| Date from | Position | Nationality | Name | To | Date to | Ref. |
|---|---|---|---|---|---|---|
| 17 June 2015 | DF | (Russia) | Vyacheslav Karavayev | Baumit Jablonec | 30 June 2016 | |
| 1 July 2015 | FW | (Russia) | Vadim Larionov | Novokuznetsk | End of Season | |
| 2 July 2015 | FW | (Russia) | Konstantin Bazelyuk | Kuban Krasnodar | End of Season | |
| 11 July 2015 | DF | (Russia) | Pyotr Ten | Tom Tomsk | End of Season | |
| 11 July 2015 | MF | (Russia) | Armen Ambartsumyan | Torpedo Armavir | End of Season | |
| 21 August 2015 | FW | (Sweden) | Carlos Strandberg | Ural | | |
| 28 August 2015 | FW | (Sweden) | Alibek Aliev | FF Jaro | End of Season | |
| 31 August 2015 | MF | (Russia) | Dmitry Yefremov | Slovan Liberec | End of Season | |
| 27 January 2016 | DF | (Russia) | Nikita Chernov | Baltika Kaliningrad | End of Season | |
| 16 February 2016 | MF | (Bulgaria) | Georgi Milanov | Grasshoppers | End of Season | |
| 31 March 2016 | FW | (Sweden) | Carlos Strandberg | AIK | End of Season | |

== Friendlies ==
| 30 June 2015 | CSKA Moscow | 0 – 1 | Fakel Voronezh | Vatutinki |
| 14:00 MSK (UTC+3) | | Summary | Dutov 49' |

| 4 July 2015 | CSKA Moscow | 0 – 2 | Tosno | Vatutinki |
| 12:00 MSK (UTC+3) | Eremenko (yellow card) 27'; Berezutski (yellow card) 59' | Summary | Astafyev 21'; Chirkin (yellow card) 29'; Golyshev 57' |

| 8 July 2015 | CSKA Moscow | 4 – 1 | Khimki | Moscow |
| 12:00 MSK (UTC+3) | Milanov 3'; Musa 18'; Eremenko 58'; Wernbloom 76' | Summary | Chernyshov (yellow card) 29'; A.Erkin (yellow card) 45'; M.Markosov 50'; Gashchenkov (yellow card) 55' | Stadium: Otkrytiye Arena |

| 11 July 2015 | CSKA Moscow | 2 – 0 | Krylia Sovetov | Moscow |
| 17:00 MSK (UTC+3) | Musa 13'; Natcho 58' | Summary | | Stadium: Otkrytiye Arena |

| 15 November 2015 | CSKA Moscow | 0 – 2 | Dynamo Moscow | Moscow |
| 14:00 MSK (UTC+3) | | Summary | Dyakov 5' (pen.); Kalyashin (yellow card) 69'; N.Kanavin 72' | Referee: C. Kuznetsov |

| 20 January 2016 | CSKA Moscow (Russia) | 4 – 0 | (Switzerland) Sion | Murcia, Spain |
| 18:00 MSK (UTC+3) | Golovin 41'; Musa 43'; Tošić 45'; Panchenko 51' | Summary | | Stadium: Pinatar Arena |

| 21 January 2016 | CSKA Moscow (Russia) | – | (Spain) Trialist | Murcia, Spain |
| 14:00 MSK (UTC+3) | | [ Summary] | | Stadium: Pinatar Arena |

| 27 January 2016 | CSKA Moscow (Russia) | 0 – 2 | (Norway) Odd | San Pedro del Pinatar, Spain |
| 18:00 MSK (UTC+3) | Wernbloom (yellow card) 32' (yellow-red card) 61'; Milanov (yellow card) 83' | Summary | Occéan 3'; Zekhnini 40' | Stadium: Pinatar Arena |

| 30 January 2016 | CSKA Moscow (Russia) | 0 – 0 | (Croatia) Dinamo Zagreb | La Manga, Spain |
| 20:00 MSK (UTC+3) | Tkachyov (yellow card) 40'; Cauņa (yellow card) 86' | Summary | J. Fernandes (yellow card) 43'; Gonçalo (yellow card) 79'; M. Musa (yellow card) 85' |

| 3 February 2016 | CSKA Moscow (Russia) | 4 – 1 | (Norway) Vålerenga | La Manga, Spain |
| 21:00 MSK (UTC+3) | Wernbloom 17'; Golovin 44'; Musa 60'; Panchenko 78' | Summary | Brown 22'; Ómarsson (yellow card) 88' |

| 6 February 2016 | CSKA Moscow (Russia) | 2 – 0 | (Moldova) Dacia Chișinău | La Manga, Spain |
| 14:00 MSK (UTC+3) | Natcho 15'; Strandberg 34' | Summary |

| 14 February 2016 | CSKA Moscow | 0 – 0 | Amkar Perm | Marbella, Spain |
| 18:00 MSK (UTC+3) | | Summary |

| 18 February 2016 | CSKA Moscow | 2 – 1 | Dynamo Moscow | Marbella, Spain |
| 18:00 MSK (UTC+3) | Berezutski 56'; Golovin 63' | Summary | Zobnin 83' |

| 21 February 2016 | CSKA Moscow | 3 – 0 | Anzhi Makhachkala | Marbella, Spain |
| 14:00 MSK (UTC+3) | Tošić 15'; Golovin 36'; Strandberg 85' | Summary |

| 24 February 2016 | CSKA Moscow (Russia) | 4 – 0 | (Spain) Málaga | Marbella, Spain |
| 20:30 MSK (UTC+3) | Shirokov 24', 26'; Gayar 37' (o.g.); Eremenko 57' | Summary |

== Competitions ==
=== Russian Premier League ===
==== Results by round ====
| Round | 1 | 2 | 3 | 4 | 5 | 6 | 7 | 8 | 9 | 10 | 11 | 12 | 13 | 14 | 15 | 16 | 17 | 18 | 19 | 20 | 21 | 22 | 23 | 24 | 25 | 26 | 27 | 28 | 29 | 30 |
|---|---|---|---|---|---|---|---|---|---|---|---|---|---|---|---|---|---|---|---|---|---|---|---|---|---|---|---|---|---|---|
| Ground | H | A | H | H | A | H | A | H | A | H | A | H | A | H | A | H | A | A | H | A | H | A | A | A | H | A | H | A | H | A |
| Result | W | W | W | W | W | W | W | D | W | D | W | W | D | W | L | L | D | L | W | L | W | L | W | D | W | W | W | W | W | W |
| Position | 3 | 3 | 2 | 2 | 1 | 1 | 1 | 1 | 1 | 1 | 1 | 1 | 1 | 1 | 1 | 1 | 1 | 1 | 1 | 2 | 1 | 2 | 1 | 2 | 2 | 1 | 1 | 1 | 1 | 1 |

Updated to match(es) played on 19 May 2016. Source: Russian Premier League
A = Away; H = Home; W = Win; D = Draw; L = Loss

==== Matches ====
| 18 July 2015 1 | CSKA Moscow | 1 – 0 | Rubin Kazan | Khimki |
| 18:30 MSK (UTC+3) | Wernbloom (yellow card) 36'; Nababkin (yellow card) 61'; Musa 87' | Summary | Dyadyun (yellow card) 68'; Batov (yellow card) 73' | Stadium: Arena Khimki; Attendance: 10,000; Referee: Vladislav Bezborodov |

| 24 July 2015 2 | Krylia Sovetov | 0 – 2 | CSKA Moscow | Samara |
| 19:00 MSK (UTC+3) | | Summary | Berezutski (yellow card) 55'; Tošić 64'; Natcho 71' (pen.) (yellow card) 76'; Strandberg (yellow card) 90+1'; Cauņa (yellow card) 90+2' | Stadium: Metallurg Stadium; Attendance: 23,316; Referee: Sergey Lapochkin |

| 1 August 2015 3 | CSKA Moscow | 1 – 0 | Anzhi Makhachkala | Khimki |
| 19:30 MSK (UTC+3) | Fernandes 3'; Nababkin (yellow card) 52'; Wernbloom (yellow card) 57' | Summary | | Stadium: Arena Khimki; Attendance: 7,000; Referee: Vladimir Moskalyov |

| 9 August 2015 4 | CSKA Moscow | 2 – 0 | Amkar Prem | Khimki |
| 13:30 MSK (UTC+3) | Natcho 2' (pen.); Berezutski (yellow card) 32'; Tošić 41' | Report | Cherenchikov (yellow card) 1'; Uzochukwu (yellow card) 30' | Stadium: Arena Khimki; Attendance: 6,061; Referee: Igor Nizovtsev |

| 14 August 2015 5 | Spartak Moscow | 1 – 2 | CSKA Moscow | Moscow |
| 21:30 MSK (UTC+3) | Kombarov 36' (pen.); Zé Luís (yellow card) 76'; Bocchetti (yellow card) 87' | Summary | Ignashevich 31' (yellow card) 48'; Musa 35'; Dzagoev (yellow card) 74'; Akinfeev (yellow card) 90+3' | Stadium: Otkrytiye Arena; Attendance: 41,850; Referee: Vitaly Meshkov |

| 20 August 2015 6 | CSKA Moscow | 2 – 1 | Rostov | Khimki |
| 18:00 MSK (UTC+3) | Musa 66'; Dzagoev 88' | Summary | Azmoun 10'; Mogilevets (yellow card) 38'; Bukharov (yellow card) 52'; Kanga (yellow card) 90+4'; Kalachev (yellow card) 90+4' | Stadium: Arena Khimki; Attendance: 7,000; Referee: Kirill Levnikov |

| 22 August 2015 7 | Kuban Krasnodar | 0 – 1 | CSKA Moscow | Krasnodar |
| 20:00 MSK (UTC+3) | Xandão (yellow card) 23'; Armaș (yellow card) 50' | Summary | Eremenko (yellow card) 47'; Milanov (yellow card) 75'; Nababkin 88'; Berezutski (yellow card) 90'; Dzagoev (yellow card) 90' | Stadium: Kuban Stadium; Attendance: 12,211; Referee: Vladimir Moskalyov |

| 12 September 2015 8 | CSKA Moscow | 2 – 2 | Zenit St.Petersburg | Khimki |
| 14:00 MSK (UTC+3) | Lombaerts 9' (o.g.); Doumbia 22'; Tošić (yellow card) 38'; Wernbloom (yellow card) 44' | Summary | Hulk 39' (pen.); Dzyuba (yellow card) 41'; García (yellow card) 52'; Garay (yellow card) 79'; Witsel (yellow card) 79'; Smolnikov 88'; Neto (yellow card) 88' | Stadium: Arena Khimki; Attendance: 15,000; Referee: Vitaly Meshkov |

| 20 September 2015 9 | Mordovia Saransk | 4 – 6 | CSKA Moscow | Saransk |
| 13:30 MSK (UTC+3) | Lutsenko 1', 68'; Rykov 13' (yellow card) 36'; Mukhametshin 15'; Djaló (yellow card) 38' (yellow-red card) 54' | Summary | Fernandes (red card) 12'; Panchenko 50'; Tošić 58'; Doumbia 59', 88'; Natcho (yellow card) 70'; Musa 80', 85' | Stadium: Start Stadium; Attendance: 7,837; Referee: Igor Nizovtsev |

| 26 September 2015 10 | CSKA Moscow | 1 – 1 | Lokomotiv Moscow | Khimki |
| 14:00 MSK (UTC+3) | Doumbia 16' (pen.); Dzagoev (yellow card) 37'; Tošić (yellow card) 80' | Summary | Niasse 21' (pen.); Denisov (yellow card) 58'; Ćorluka (yellow card) 65' (yellow-red card) 81' | Stadium: Arena Khimki; Attendance: 13,000; Referee: Sergey Karasev |

| 4 October 2015 11 | Dynamo Moscow | 0 – 2 | CSKA Moscow | Khimki |
| 13:30 MSK (UTC+3) | Zobnin (yellow card) 35' | Summary | Wernbloom 47'; Tošić (yellow card) 65'; Dzagoev (yellow card) 69'; Musa 77' | Stadium: Arena Khimki; Attendance: 13,329; Referee: Alexey Nikolaev |

| 17 October 2015 12 | CSKA Moscow | 3 – 2 | Ural | Khimki |
| 14:00 MSK (UTC+3) | Panchenko 2'; Doumbia 38'; Tošić (yellow card) 40'; Wernbloom 56' | Summary | Acevedo 22'; Erokhin (yellow card) 28'; Dantsev (yellow card) 31'; Gogniyev 60'; Kulakov (yellow card) 86' | Stadium: Arena Khimki; Attendance: 10,000; Referee: Sergei Ivanov |

| 25 October 2015 13 | Terek Grozny | 0 – 0 | CSKA Moscow | Grozny |
| 19:00 MSK (UTC+3) | Semyonov (yellow card) 32' | Summary | Dzagoev (yellow card) 30'; Eremenko (yellow card) 67'; Wernbloom (yellow card) 72'; Musa (yellow card) 90' | Stadium: Akhmat-Arena; Attendance: 17,820; Referee: Sergei Lanochkin |

| 31 October 2015 14 | CSKA Moscow | 2 – 0 | Ufa | Khimki |
| 14:30 MSK (UTC+3) | Ignashevich 21' (pen.); Wernbloom (yellow card) 21'; Tošić 62' | Summary | Alikin (yellow card) 20' | Stadium: Arena Khimki; Attendance: 5,500; Referee: Vladimir Moskalyov |

| 8 November 2015 15 | Krasnodar | 2 – 1 | CSKA Moscow | Krasnodar |
| 17:00 MSK (UTC+3) | Smolov 18', 80'; Ahmedov (yellow card) 70'; Ari (yellow card) 81'; Laborde (yellow card) 90+4' | Summary | Dzagoev 28'; Wernbloom (yellow card) 45+1'; Berezutski (yellow card) 56' | Stadium: Kuban Stadium; Attendance: 12,755; Referee: Vladislav Bezborodov |

| 21 November 2015 16 | CSKA Moscow | 0 – 2 | Krylia Sovetov | Khimki |
| 14:00 MSK (UTC+3) | | Summary | Jahović 52', 66'; Simaeys (yellow card) 82'; Rodić (yellow card) 89' | Stadium: Arena Khimki; Attendance: 6,000; Referee: Mikhail Vilkov |

| 29 November 2015 17 | Anzhi Makhachkala | 1 – 1 | CSKA Moscow | Kaspiysk |
| 15:00 MSK (UTC+3) | Tagirbekov (yellow card) 35'; Maksimov 55'; Tigiyev (yellow card) 82' | Summary | Nababkin 10'; Vasin (yellow card) 24'; Wernbloom (yellow card) 44'; Cauņa (yellow card) 78'; Panchenko (yellow card) 86' | Stadium: Anzhi Arena; Attendance: 8,100; Referee: Sergei Lapochkin |

| 3 December 2015 18 | Amkar Perm | 2 – 0 | CSKA Moscow | Perm |
| 17:00 MSK (UTC+3) | Shavayev 37'; Ogude (yellow card) 49'; Salugin 80' (yellow card) 88' | Summary | Cauņa (yellow card) 67' | Stadium: Zvezda Stadium; Attendance: 5,175; Referee: Aleksandr Egorov |

| 6 March 2016 19 | CSKA Moscow | 1 – 0 | Spartak Moscow | Khimki |
| 19:30 MSK (UTC+3) | Musa 11'; Wernbloom (yellow card) 51' | Summary | Kombarov (yellow card) 39'; Makeyev (yellow card) 53'; Bocchetti (yellow card) 83' | Stadium: Arena Khimki; Attendance: 18,200; Referee: Alexei Nikolaev |

| 12 March 2016 20 | Rostov | 2 – 0 | CSKA Moscow | Rostov-on-Don |
| 19:30 MSK (UTC+3) | Navas (yellow card) 20'; Azmoun (yellow card) 27'; Poloz 45'; Kanga (yellow card) 64'; Gațcan (yellow card) 86'; Noboa (yellow card) 87'; Doumbia 90+4' | Summary | Shchennikov (yellow card) 34'; Tošić (yellow card) 38'; Wernbloom (yellow card) 40'; Dzagoev (yellow card) 45'; Musa (yellow card) 90+1' | Stadium: Olimp-2; Attendance: 15,800; Referee: Vladislav Bezborodov |

| 19 March 2016 21 | CSKA Moscow | 2 – 0 | Kuban Krasnodar | Khimki |
| 19:30 MSK (UTC+3) | Wernbloom (yellow card) 16'; Musa 21', 81' | Summary | Apodi (yellow card) 59'; Bucur (yellow card) 64'; Baldé (yellow card) 90+1'; Yakuba (yellow card) 90+1' | Stadium: Arena Khimki; Attendance: 7,100; Referee: Vladimir Moskalyov |

| 3 April 2016 22 | Zenit St.Petersburg | 2 – 0 | CSKA Moscow | Saint Petersburg |
| 19:30 MSK (UTC+3) | Hulk 54', 79'; Smolnikov (yellow card) 58'; Witsel (yellow card) 81' | Summary | Wernbloom (yellow card) 42'; Berezutski (yellow card) 78' | Stadium: Petrovsky Stadium; Attendance: 17,835; Referee: Aleksandr Egorov |

| 9 April 2016 23 | CSKA Moscow | 7 – 1 | Mordovia Saransk | Khimki |
| 13:30 MSK (UTC+3) | Shitov 3' (o.g.); Eremenko 11', 76'; Golovin 23'; Musa 25'; Ignashevich 27'; Dzagoev 78' | Summary | Stevanović (yellow card) 58'; Samodin 67'; Rykov (yellow card) 85' | Stadium: Arena Khimki; Attendance: 7,000; Referee: Mikhail Vilkov |

| 16 April 2016 24 | Lokomotiv Moscow | 1 – 1 | CSKA Moscow | Moscow |
| 17:00 MSK (UTC+3) | Denisov (yellow card) 7'; Ćorluka 22'; Al.Miranchuk (yellow card) 72' | Summary | Wernbloom (yellow card) 30'; Samuel (yellow card) 57' (goal) 84'; Dzagoev (yellow card) 67' | Stadium: Lokomotiv Stadium; Attendance: 22,304; Referee: Alexey Nikolaev |

| 24 April 2016 25 | CSKA Moscow | 1 – 0 | Dynamo Moscow | Khimki |
| 17:00 MSK (UTC+3) | Berezutski 56'; Eremenko (yellow card) 60' | Summary | Denisov (yellow card) 19'; Zobnin (yellow card) 69'; Yeshchenko (red card) 90+2' | Stadium: Arena Khimki; Attendance: 11,000; Referee: Aleksey Eskov |

| 28 April 2016 26 | Ural | 0 – 3 | CSKA Moscow | Yekaterinburg |
| 17:00 MSK (UTC+3) | Fidler (yellow card) 31'; Dantsev (yellow card) 53' | Summary | Olanare 19'; Musa 60'; Dzagoev 76' | Stadium: SKB-Bank Arena; Attendance: 6,450; Referee: Sergey Lapochkin |

| 7 May 2016 27 | CSKA Moscow | 1 – 0 | Terek Grozny | Khimki |
| 14:30 MSK (UTC+3) | Wernbloom 18' | Summary | Rodolfo (yellow card) 13'; Wilkshire (yellow card) 53' (yellow-red card) 80' | Stadium: Arena Khimki; Attendance: 7,500; Referee: Vladimir Moskalyov |

| 11 May 2016 28 | Ufa | 1 – 3 | CSKA Moscow | Ufa |
| 17:00 MSK (UTC+3) | Sysuyev 17'; Alikin (yellow card) 63'; Nikitin (yellow card) 84'; Paurević (yellow card) 84' | Summary | Dzagoev 14'; Wernbloom 61' (yellow card) 76'; Musa 70'; Berezutski (yellow card) 90+1' | Stadium: Neftyanik Stadium; Attendance: 10,460; Referee: Mikhail Vilkov |

| 16 May 2016 29 | CSKA Moscow | 2 – 0 | Krasnodar | Khimki |
| 19:30 MSK (UTC+3) | Musa 17'; Eremenko 47'; Panchenko (yellow card) 79' | Summary | Torbinski (yellow card) 53'; Sigurðsson (yellow card) 84'; Laborde (yellow card) 90+2'; Kaboré (red card) 90+2' | Stadium: Arena Khimki; Attendance: 13,500; Referee: Vitaly Meshkov |

| 21 May 2016 30 | Rubin Kazan | 0 – 1 | CSKA Moscow | Kazan |
| 13:30 MSK (UTC+3) | Karadeniz (yellow card) 18'; Cotugno (yellow card) 42' | Summary | Dzagoev 19'; Tošić (yellow card) 43'; Ignashevich (yellow card) 75'; Wernbloom (yellow card) 90+2' | Stadium: Kazan Arena; Attendance: 20,352; Referee: Sergey Lapochkin |

==== League table ====
| Pos | Team | Pld | W | D | L | GF | GA | GD | Pts | Qualification or relegation |
|---|---|---|---|---|---|---|---|---|---|---|
| 1 | CSKA Moscow (C) | 30 | 20 | 5 | 5 | 51 | 25 | +26 | 65 | Qualification for the Champions League group stage |
| 2 | Rostov | 30 | 19 | 6 | 5 | 41 | 20 | +21 | 63 | Qualification for the Champions League third qualifying round |
| 3 | Zenit Saint Petersburg | 30 | 17 | 8 | 5 | 61 | 32 | +29 | 59 | Qualification for the Europa League group stage (Note: Zenit Saint Petersburg qualified for the Europa League group stage by winning the 2015–16 Russian Cup.) |
| 4 | Krasnodar | 30 | 16 | 8 | 6 | 54 | 25 | +29 | 56 | Qualification for the Europa League third qualifying round |
| 5 | Spartak Moscow | 30 | 15 | 5 | 10 | 48 | 39 | +9 | 50 | Qualification for the Europa League third qualifying round |

Source: Russian Premier League, Soccerway
Rules for classification: 1) Points; 2) Matches won; 3) Head-to-head points; 4) Head-to-head matches won; 5) Head-to-head goal difference; 6) Head-to-head goals scored; 7) Head-to-head away goals; 8) Goal difference; 9) Goals scored; 10) Away goals scored.
(C) Champions

=== Russian Cup ===
| 23 September 2015 Round of 32 | Baikal Irkutsk | 1 – 2 (a.e.t.) | CSKA Moscow | Irkutsk |
| 13:30 MSK (UTC+3) | Mashnev 32' (yellow card) 119'; Yashin (yellow card) 78' | Summary | Wernbloom (yellow card) 5'; Chernov (yellow card) 45'; Cauņa 78'; Panchenko 109'; Vasin (yellow card) 112' | Stadium: Lokomotiv Stadium; Attendance: 12,000; Referee: Roman Galimov |

| 28 October 2015 Round of 16 | CSKA Moscow | 2 – 1 | Ural | Khimki |
| 19:30 MSK (UTC+3) | Panchenko 47'; Tošić 86' | Summary | Acevedo (yellow card) 67'; Podberyozkin 79' | Stadium: Arena Khimki; Attendance: 3,000; Referee: Kirill Levnikov |

| 1 March 2016 Quarterfinal | Ufa | 0 – 2 | CSKA Moscow | Ufa |
| 16:00 MSK (UTC+3) | | Summary | Berezutski (yellow card) 55'; Shirokov 57'; Musa 75' | Stadium: Neftyanik Stadium; Attendance: 9,850; Referee: Sergey Lapochkin |

| 20 April 2016 Semifinal | CSKA Moscow | 3 – 1 | Krasnodar | Khimki |
| 19:30 MSK (UTC+3) | Wernbloom (yellow card) 32'; Golovin 35', 40'; Dzagoev 46' | Summary | Kaboré (yellow card) 64' (yellow-red card) 90'; Sigurðsson 73'; Smolov (yellow card) 90' | Stadium: Arena Khimki; Attendance: 4,587; Referee: Vitaly Meshkov |

==== Final ====
| 2 May 2016 | CSKA Moscow | 1 – 4 | Zenit St.Petersburg | Kazan |
| 16:00 MSK (UTC+3) | Berezutski (yellow card) 18'; Samuel 36'; Eremenko (yellow card) 53'; Berezutski (red card) 62'; Panchenko (yellow card) 68' | Summary | Hulk 34' (pen.), 63' (pen.); Kokorin 55'; Yusupov 69'; Shatov (yellow card) 75' | Stadium: Kazan Arena; Attendance: 36,562; Referee: Aleksandr Egorov |

=== UEFA Champions League ===
==== Qualifying round ====
| 28 July 2015 Third qualifying round 1st leg | CSKA Moscow (Russia) | 2 – 2 | (Czech Republic) Sparta Prague | Khimki, Russia |
| 19:15 MSK (UTC+3) | Dzagoev 14'; Tošić (yellow card) 52' (goal) 53'; Wernbloom (yellow card) 86'; Strandberg (yellow card) 90' | Summary | Fatai 15' (yellow card) 45+1'; Holek (yellow card) 29'; Krejčí (yellow card) 44' (goal) 57'; Matějovský (yellow card) 68' | Stadium: Arena Khimki; Attendance: 10,500; Referee: Javier Estrada Fernández (Spain) |

| 5 August 2015 Third qualifying round 2nd leg | Sparta Prague (Czech Republic) | 2 – 3 (4 – 5 agg.) | (Russia) CSKA Moscow | Prague, Czech Republic |
| 19:45 MSK (UTC+3) | Krejčí 6'; Fatai 16'; Frýdek (yellow card) 28'; Matějovský (red card) 64'; Hušbauer (yellow card) 89' | Report | Musa 34', 51'; Berezutski (yellow card) 73'; Dzagoev 76' | Stadium: Generali Arena; Attendance: 16,580; Referee: Paolo Mazzoleni (Italy) |

| 18 August 2015 Playoff round 1st leg | Sporting CP (Portugal) | 2 – 1 | (Russia) CSKA Moscow | Lisbon, Portugal |
| 21:45 MSK (UTC+3) | Gutiérrez 12' (yellow card) 23'; Jefferson (yellow card) 26'; Pereira (yellow card) 47'; Slimani (yellow card) 56' (goal) 82' | Report | Wernbloom (yellow card) 28'; Fernandes (yellow card) 61'; Doumbia 40' (yellow card) 70' | Stadium: Estádio José Alvalade; Attendance: 41,826; Referee: Cüneyt Çakır (Turkey) |

| 26 August 2015 Playoff round 2nd leg | CSKA Moscow (Russia) | 3 – 1 (4 – 3 agg.) | (Portugal) Sporting CP | Khimki, Russia |
| 21:45 MSK (UTC+3) | Doumbia 49', 72' (yellow card) 69'; Dzagoev (yellow card) 62'; Wernbloom (yellow card) 83'; Musa 85' | Report | Gutiérrez 36'; Carvalho (yellow card) 48'; Aquilani (yellow card) 61'; Mário (red card) 90+2' | Stadium: Arena Khimki; Attendance: 17,259; Referee: Pavel Královec (Czech Republic) |

==== Group stage ====
| Pos | Team | Pld | W | D | L | GF | GA | GD | Pts | Qualification | WOL | PSV | MUN | CSKA |
|---|---|---|---|---|---|---|---|---|---|---|---|---|---|---|
| 1 | (Germany) VfL Wolfsburg | 6 | 4 | 0 | 2 | 9 | 6 | +3 | 12 | Advance to knockout phase | — | 2–0 | 3–2 | 1–0 |
| 2 | (Netherlands) PSV Eindhoven | 6 | 3 | 1 | 2 | 8 | 7 | +1 | 10 | Advance to knockout phase | 2–0 | — | 2–1 | 2–1 |
| 3 | (England) Manchester United | 6 | 2 | 2 | 2 | 7 | 7 | 0 | 8 | Transfer to Europa League | 2–1 | 0–0 | — | 1–0 |
| 4 | (Russia) CSKA Moscow | 6 | 1 | 1 | 4 | 5 | 9 | −4 | 4 | | 0–2 | 3–2 | 1–1 | — |

Source: UEFA
Rules for classification: Group stage tiebreakers

| 15 September 2015 1 | Wolfsburg (Germany) | 1 – 0 | (Russia) CSKA Moscow | Wolfsburg, Germany |
| 21:45 MSK (UTC+3) | Draxler 40' | Report | | Stadium: Volkswagen Arena; Attendance: 20,126; Referee: Svein Oddvar Moen (Norway) |

| 30 September 2015 2 | CSKA Moscow (Russia) | 3 – 2 | (Netherlands) PSV Eindhoven | Khimki, Russia |
| 21:45 MSK (UTC+3) | Musa 7'; Doumbia 21', 36' (pen.); Shchennikov (yellow card) 86' | Report | Locadia (yellow card) 16'; Zoet (yellow card) 35'; Arias (yellow card) 43' (yellow-red card) 80'; Lestienne 60', 68' | Stadium: Arena Khimki; Attendance: 16,152; Referee: Ruddy Buquet (France) |

| 21 October 2015 3 | CSKA Moscow (Russia) | 1 – 1 | (England) Manchester United | Khimki, Russia |
| 21:45 MSK (UTC+3) | Doumbia 15' | Report | Martial (yellow card) 14' (goal) 65'; Herrera (yellow card) 80'; Fellaini (yellow card) 90' | Stadium: Arena Khimki; Attendance: 18,456; Referee: Carlos Velasco Carballo (Spain) |

| 3 November 2015 4 | Manchester United (England) | 1 – 0 | (Russia) CSKA Moscow | Manchester, England |
| 22:45 MSK (UTC+3) | Rooney 79' | Report | Shchennikov (yellow card) 20'; Wernbloom (yellow card) 60' | Stadium: Old Trafford; Attendance: 75,165; Referee: Szymon Marciniak (Poland) |

| 25 November 2015 5 | CSKA Moscow (Russia) | 0 – 2 | (Germany) Wolfsburg | Khimki, Russia |
| 20:00 MSK (UTC+3) | Musa (yellow card) 17'; Fernández (yellow card) 28'; Wernbloom (yellow card) 62'; Natcho (yellow card) 90+3' | Report | Akinfeev 67' (o.g.); Schürrle 88' | Stadium: Arena Khimki; Attendance: 16,450; Referee: Gianluca Rocchi (Italy) |

| 8 December 2015 6 | PSV Eindhoven (Netherlands) | 2 – 1 | (Russia) CSKA Moscow | Eindhoven, Netherlands |
| 22:45 MSK (UTC+3) | Pereiro (yellow card) 66'; Guardado (yellow card) 75' de Jong (yellow card) 75' (goal) 78'; Bruma (yellow card) 83'; Pröpper 86' | Report | Wernbloom (yellow card) 37'; Nababkin (yellow card) 56'; Ignashevich 76' (pen.); Cauņa (yellow card) 77' | Stadium: Philips Stadion; Referee: David Fernández Borbalán (Spain) |

== Squad statistics ==
As of match played 21 May 2016

=== Appearances and goals ===
| No. | Pos | Nat | Player | Total | | Premier League | | Russian Cup | | Champions League | |
| No. | Pos | Nat | Player | Apps | Goals | Apps | Goals | Apps | Goals | Apps | Goals |
|---|---|---|---|---|---|---|---|---|---|---|---|
| 1 | GK | (Russia) RUS | Sergei Chepchugov | 2 | 0 | 0 | 0 | 2 | 0 | 0 | 0 |
| 2 | DF | (Brazil) BRA | Mário Fernandes | 41 | 1 | 27 | 1 | 5 | 0 | 9 | 0 |
| 3 | MF | (Sweden) SWE | Pontus Wernbloom | 40 | 4 | 26+1 | 4 | 2+1 | 0 | 10 | 0 |
| 4 | DF | (Russia) RUS | Sergei Ignashevich | 38 | 4 | 24+1 | 3 | 3 | 0 | 9+1 | 1 |
| 5 | DF | (Russia) RUS | Viktor Vasin | 7 | 0 | 3 | 0 | 2+1 | 0 | 0+1 | 0 |
| 6 | DF | (Russia) RUS | Aleksei Berezutski | 34 | 1 | 16+5 | 1 | 4 | 0 | 6+3 | 0 |
| 7 | MF | (Serbia) SRB | Zoran Tošić | 41 | 6 | 27+1 | 4 | 2+1 | 1 | 10 | 1 |
| 8 | FW | (Russia) RUS | Kirill Panchenko | 22 | 4 | 3+11 | 2 | 2+2 | 2 | 0+4 | 0 |
| 10 | MF | (Russia) RUS | Alan Dzagoev | 43 | 9 | 29 | 6 | 3+1 | 1 | 10 | 2 |
| 14 | DF | (Russia) RUS | Kirill Nababkin | 23 | 2 | 11+2 | 2 | 3+1 | 0 | 5+1 | 0 |
| 15 | MF | (Russia) RUS | Roman Shirokov | 9 | 1 | 2+6 | 0 | 1 | 1 | 0 | 0 |
| 17 | MF | (Russia) RUS | Sergei Tkachyov | 11 | 0 | 2+6 | 0 | 1+2 | 0 | 0 | 0 |
| 18 | FW | (Nigeria) NGR | Ahmed Musa | 44 | 18 | 30 | 13 | 3+1 | 1 | 10 | 4 |
| 19 | MF | (Latvia) LAT | Aleksandrs Cauņa | 13 | 1 | 2+7 | 0 | 2 | 1 | 1+1 | 0 |
| 20 | MF | (Russia) RUS | Amir Natkho | 2 | 0 | 0 | 0 | 1+1 | 0 | 0 | 0 |
| 24 | DF | (Russia) RUS | Vasili Berezutski | 24 | 0 | 18 | 0 | 1 | 0 | 5 | 0 |
| 25 | MF | (Finland) FIN | Roman Eremenko | 35 | 3 | 23+2 | 3 | 3 | 0 | 6+1 | 0 |
| 35 | GK | (Russia) RUS | Igor Akinfeev | 43 | 0 | 30 | 0 | 3 | 0 | 10 | 0 |
| 42 | DF | (Russia) RUS | Georgi Shchennikov | 26 | 0 | 18+1 | 0 | 0+1 | 0 | 5+1 | 0 |
| 60 | MF | (Russia) RUS | Aleksandr Golovin | 23 | 3 | 6+11 | 1 | 4 | 2 | 0+2 | 0 |
| 66 | MF | (Israel) ISR | Bibras Natcho | 30 | 2 | 15+5 | 2 | 2 | 0 | 6+2 | 0 |
| 99 | FW | (Nigeria) NGR | Aaron Samuel | 10 | 3 | 3+4 | 2 | 2+1 | 1 | 0 | 0 |
Players away from the club on loan:
| 11 | FW | (Sweden) SWE | Carlos Strandberg | 2 | 0 | 0+1 | 0 | 0 | 0 | 0+1 | 0 |
| 15 | MF | (Russia) RUS | Dmitri Yefremov | 1 | 0 | 0+1 | 0 | 0 | 0 | 0 | 0 |
| 23 | MF | (Bulgaria) BUL | Georgi Milanov | 28 | 0 | 4+14 | 0 | 2 | 0 | 2+6 | 0 |
| 91 | DF | (Russia) RUS | Nikita Chernov | 1 | 0 | 0 | 0 | 1 | 0 | 0 | 0 |
Players who left CSKA Moscow during the season:
| 88 | FW | (Ivory Coast) CIV | Seydou Doumbia | 21 | 11 | 11+2 | 5 | 0 | 0 | 6+2 | 6 |

=== Goalscorers ===
| Place | Position | Nation | Number | Name | Russian Premier League | Russian Cup | UEFA Champions League | Total |
|---|---|---|---|---|---|---|---|---|
| 1 | FW | (Nigeria) | 18 | Ahmed Musa | 13 | 1 | 4 | 18 |
| 2 | FW | (Ivory Coast) | 88 | Seydou Doumbia | 5 | 0 | 6 | 11 |
| 3 | MF | (Russia) | 10 | Alan Dzagoev | 6 | 1 | 2 | 9 |
| 4 | MF | (Serbia) | 7 | Zoran Tošić | 4 | 1 | 1 | 6 |
| 5 | MF | (Sweden) | 3 | Pontus Wernbloom | 4 | 0 | 0 | 4 |
| 5 | DF | (Russia) | 4 | Sergei Ignashevich | 3 | 0 | 1 | 4 |
| 5 | FW | (Russia) | 8 | Kirill Panchenko | 2 | 2 | 0 | 4 |
| 8 | MF | (Finland) | 25 | Roman Eremenko | 3 | 0 | 0 | 3 |
| 8 | FW | (Nigeria) | 99 | Aaron Samuel | 2 | 1 | 0 | 3 |
| 8 | MF | (Russia) | 60 | Aleksandr Golovin | 1 | 2 | 0 | 3 |
| 11 | MF | (Israel) | 66 | Bibras Natcho | 2 | 0 | 0 | 2 |
| 11 | DF | (Russia) | 14 | Kirill Nababkin | 2 | 0 | 0 | 2 |
| 11 | | | | Own goal | 2 | 0 | 0 | 2 |
| 14 | DF | (Brazil) | 2 | Mário Fernandes | 1 | 0 | 0 | 1 |
| 14 | DF | (Russia) | 6 | Aleksei Berezutski | 1 | 0 | 0 | 1 |
| 14 | MF | (Latvia) | 19 | Aleksandrs Cauņa | 0 | 1 | 0 | 1 |
| 14 | MF | (Russia) | 15 | Roman Shirokov | 0 | 1 | 0 | 1 |
| | | | | TOTALS | 51 | 10 | 14 | 75 |

=== Disciplinary record ===
| Number | Nation | Position | Name | Russian Premier League | | Russian Cup | | UEFA Champions League | | Total | |
| Number | Nation | Position | Name | Yellow card | Red card | Yellow card | Red card | Yellow card | Red card | Yellow card | Red card |
| 2 | (Brazil) | DF | Mário Fernandes | 0 | 1 | 0 | 0 | 2 | 0 | 2 | 1 |
| 3 | (Sweden) | MF | Pontus Wernbloom | 15 | 0 | 2 | 0 | 6 | 0 | 23 | 0 |
| 4 | (Russia) | DF | Sergei Ignashevich | 2 | 0 | 0 | 0 | 0 | 0 | 2 | 0 |
| 5 | (Russia) | DF | Viktor Vasin | 1 | 0 | 1 | 0 | 0 | 0 | 2 | 0 |
| 6 | (Russia) | DF | Aleksei Berezutski | 2 | 0 | 2 | 0 | 1 | 0 | 5 | 0 |
| 7 | (Serbia) | MF | Zoran Tošić | 6 | 0 | 0 | 0 | 1 | 0 | 7 | 0 |
| 8 | (Russia) | FW | Kirill Panchenko | 1 | 0 | 1 | 0 | 0 | 0 | 2 | 0 |
| 10 | (Russia) | MF | Alan Dzagoev | 7 | 0 | 0 | 0 | 1 | 0 | 8 | 0 |
| 14 | (Russia) | DF | Kirill Nababkin | 2 | 0 | 0 | 0 | 1 | 0 | 3 | 0 |
| 18 | (Nigeria) | FW | Ahmed Musa | 2 | 0 | 0 | 0 | 1 | 0 | 3 | 0 |
| 19 | (Latvia) | MF | Aleksandrs Cauņa | 3 | 0 | 0 | 0 | 1 | 0 | 4 | 0 |
| 23 | (Russia) | DF | Georgi Milanov | 2 | 0 | 0 | 0 | 0 | 0 | 2 | 0 |
| 24 | (Russia) | DF | Vasili Berezutski | 4 | 0 | 0 | 1 | 0 | 0 | 4 | 1 |
| 25 | (Finland) | MF | Roman Eremenko | 3 | 0 | 1 | 0 | 0 | 0 | 4 | 0 |
| 35 | (Russia) | GK | Igor Akinfeev | 1 | 0 | 0 | 0 | 0 | 0 | 1 | 0 |
| 42 | (Russia) | DF | Georgi Shchennikov | 1 | 0 | 0 | 0 | 2 | 0 | 3 | 0 |
| 66 | (Israel) | MF | Bibras Natcho | 2 | 0 | 0 | 0 | 1 | 0 | 3 | 0 |
| 88 | (Ivory Coast) | FW | Seydou Doumbia | 0 | 0 | 0 | 0 | 2 | 0 | 2 | 0 |
| 91 | (Russia) | DF | Nikita Chernov | 0 | 0 | 1 | 0 | 0 | 0 | 1 | 0 |
| 97 | (Sweden) | FW | Carlos Strandberg | 1 | 0 | 0 | 0 | 1 | 0 | 2 | 0 |
| 99 | (Nigeria) | FW | Aaron Samuel | 1 | 0 | 0 | 0 | 0 | 0 | 1 | 0 |
| | | | TOTALS | 55 | 1 | 8 | 1 | 20 | 0 | 83 | 2 |
