= Zhestkov =

Zhestkov, female Zhestkova (Russian: Жестков) is a Russian surname. Notable people with the surname include:

- Maksim Zhestkov (born 1993), Russian footballer
- Oleg Zhestkov (born 1987), Russian sprint canoeist
