= Kirill Panchenko =

Russian footballer (born 1989)

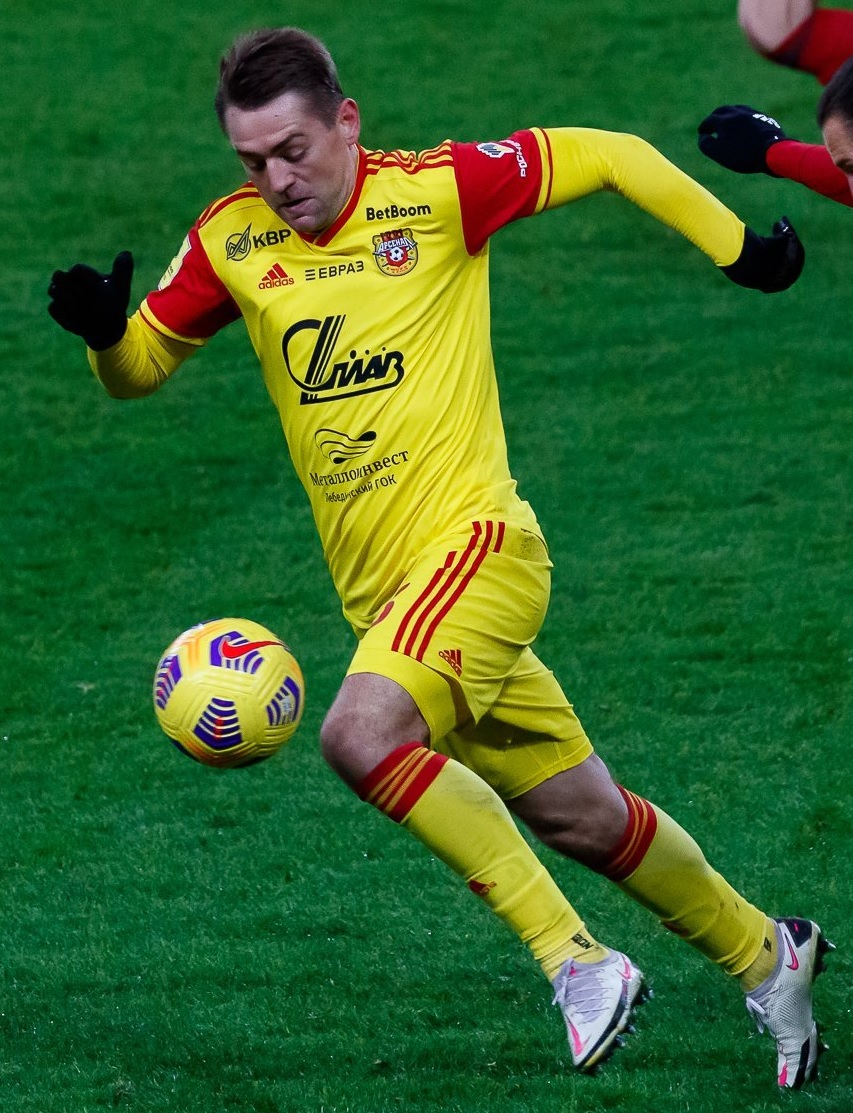
- Panchenko with Arsenal Tula in 2020

Personal information
- Full name: Kirill Viktorovich Panchenko
- Date of birth: 16 October 1989 (age 37)
- Place of birth: Lipetsk, Russian SFSR
- Height: 1.85 m (6 ft 1 in)
- Positions: Striker; second striker

Team information
- Current team: Dynamo-2 Moscow (manager)

Youth career
- CSKA Moscow
- Lokomotiv Moscow

Senior career*
Years	Team	Apps	(Gls)
2008	Dynamo Stavropol	32	(2)
2009	FC Nizhny Novgorod	6	(0)
2009	Stavropolye-2009	14	(8)
2010–2013	Mordovia Saransk	114	(31)
2013–2014	Tom Tomsk	27	(7)
2014–2017	CSKA Moscow	29	(3)
2016–2017	→ Dynamo Moscow (loan)	34	(24)
2017–2020	Dynamo Moscow	64	(12)
2020	Tambov	10	(1)
2020–2023	Arsenal Tula	58	(11)
2023–2024	Khimki	24	(1)

International career
2012	Russia-2	2	(2)
2016	Russia	1	(0)

Managerial career
- 2025–2026: Dynamo-2 Moscow (assistant)
- 2026–: Dynamo-2 Moscow
- * Club domestic league appearances and goals

Kirill Viktorovich Panchenko (Russian: Кирилл Викторович Панченко; born 16 October 1989) is a Russian football coach and former player who is the manager of Dynamo-2 Moscow.

== Club career ==
On 25 June 2013, Panchenko signed with Tom Tomsk. A year later, in July 2014, Panchenko signed for reigning Russian Premier League champions CSKA Moscow on a five-year contract. Upon signing for CSKA, Panchenko played in the shirt number 11 until Steven Zuber left the club, then he took number 8.

On 16 June 2016, he was loaned to Dynamo Moscow for the 2016–17 season. On 23 February 2017, Dynamo announced they have agreed on terms with Panchenko and will activate the buy-out clause to gain his full rights after the loan deal expires at the end of the season. CSKA confirmed the permanent transfer on 23 May 2017.

On 6 August 2020, he signed with Tambov for the term of 3 years, with an option to terminate the contract early in case of Tambov's relegation from the Russian Premier League.

On 11 October 2020 he moved to Arsenal Tula on a two-year contract.

On 28 December 2024, Panchenko left Khimki by mutual consent.

== International career ==
In October 2016, he was called up to the national team for a friendly against Costa Rica. He made his debut for the squad on 10 November 2016 in a friendly game against Qatar.

== Coaching career ==
Following his release by Khimki in December 2024, he maintained his shape by training with Dynamo-2 Moscow. He subsequently was offered a position of assistant coach with the team, which he accepted and retired from playing.

On 9 June 2026, Panchenko was promoted to the manager position at Dynamo-2.

== Personal life ==
His father Viktor Panchenko was also a professional footballer, and was the top scorer during the 1993 Russian Premier League season.

He is married to Yana, with whom he has a daughter named Kristina.

== Honours ==
Individual

- Russian National Football League top scorer: 2016–17 (24 goals for FC Dynamo Moscow)

== Club statistics ==
=== Club ===
As of match played 8 December 2024

Appearances and goals by club, season and competition
Club	Season	League			Cup		Europe		Other		Total	
Club	Season	Division	Apps	Goals	Apps	Goals	Apps	Goals	Apps	Goals	Apps	Goals
Dynamo Stavropol	2008	Russian Second League	32	2	1	0	—		—		33	2
Nizhny Novgorod	2009	Russian First League	6	0	1	0	—		—		7	0
Stavropolye-2009	2009	Russian Second League	14	8	—		—		—		14	8
Mordovia Saransk	2010	Russian First League	36	11	2	2	—		—		38	13
Mordovia Saransk	2011–12	Russian First League	50	15	2	1	—		—		52	16
Mordovia Saransk	2012–13	Russian Premier League	28	5	1	0	—		—		29	5
Mordovia Saransk	Total		114	31	5	3	0	0	0	0	119	34
Tom Tomsk	2013–14	Russian Premier League	27	7	1	0	—		2 (Note: Appearances in the relegation play-offs)	1	30	8
CSKA Moscow	2014–15	Russian Premier League	15	1	2	0	1 (Note: Appearances in the UEFA Champions League)	0	1 (Note: Appearance in the Russian Super Cup)	0	19	1
CSKA Moscow	2015–16	Russian Premier League	14	2	4	2	4	0	—		22	4
CSKA Moscow	Total		29	3	6	2	5	0	1	0	41	5
Dynamo Moscow	2016–17	Russian First League	34	24	3	1	—		—		37	25
Dynamo Moscow	2017–18	Russian Premier League	19	5	0	0	—		—		19	5
Dynamo Moscow	2018–19	Russian Premier League	23	5	1	0	—		—		24	5
Dynamo Moscow	2019–20	Russian Premier League	22	2	1	0	—		—		23	2
Dynamo Moscow	Total		98	36	5	1	0	0	0	0	103	37
Tambov	2020–21	Russian Premier League	10	1	1	1	—		—		11	2
Arsenal Tula	2020–21	Russian Premier League	16	2	3	1	—		—		19	3
Arsenal Tula	2021–22	Russian Premier League	10	0	3	1	—		—		13	1
Arsenal Tula	2022–23	Russian First League	32	9	0	0	—		—		32	9
Arsenal Tula	Total		58	11	6	2	0	0	0	0	64	13
Khimki	2023–24	Russian First League	16	1	3	1	—		—		19	2
Khimki	2024–25	Russian Premier League	8	0	5	0	—		—		13	0
Khimki	Total		24	1	8	1	—		—		32	2
Career total			411	100	34	10	5	0	3	1	453	111
