= Akaki Khubutia =

Georgian footballer (born 1986)

Akaki Khubutia აკაკი ხუბუტია
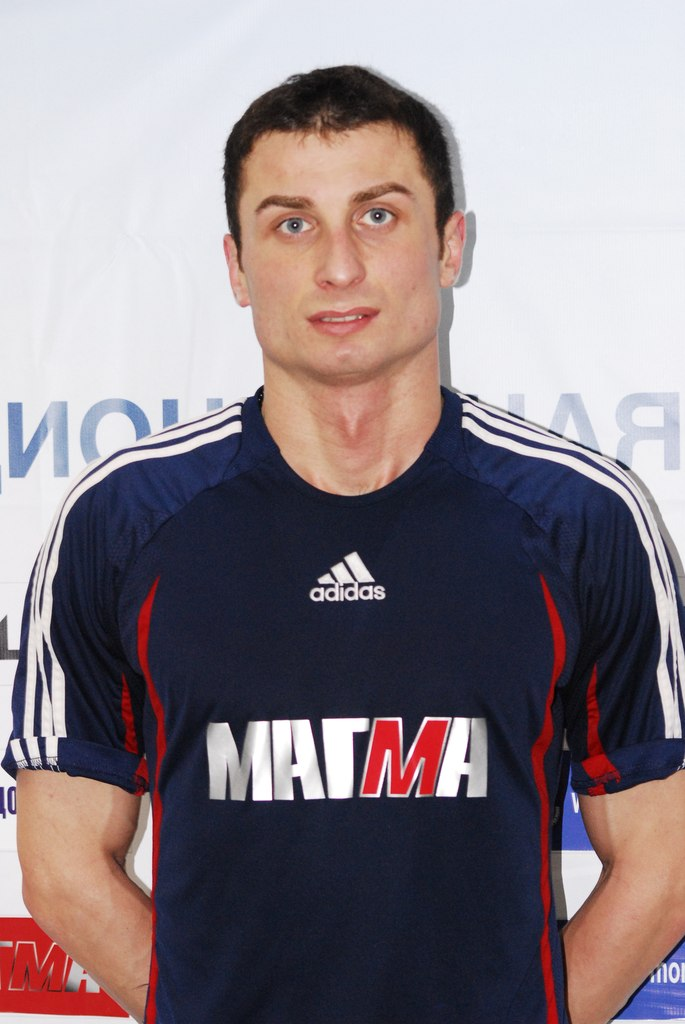
- Khubutia in 2014

Personal information
- Date of birth: 17 March 1986 (age 40)
- Place of birth: Sokhumi, Georgian SSR, USSR
- Height: 1.95 m (6 ft 5 in)
- Position: Centre back

Youth career
- Norchi Dinamo Tbilisi

Senior career*
Years	Team	Apps	(Gls)
2002–2003	Locomotive Tbilisi	0	(0)
2004	Dinamo Tbilisi 2	10	(0)
2004	→ Zvezda-BGU Minsk (loan)	9	(0)
2005–2009	FBK Kaunas	35	(1)
2005	→ Silute (loan)	49	(1)
2006	→ Vilnius (loan)	22	(0)
2009–2012	Gaz Metan Mediaș	63	(2)
2011–2012	→ Samsunspor (loan)	23	(1)
2013–2014	Mordovia Saransk	36	(2)
2015	Kerkyra	4	(0)
2015–2016	Zemplín Michalovce	17	(0)
2016	Dinamo Tbilisi	7	(0)
2017	Gaz Metan Mediaș	16	(1)
2018	Poli Timișoara	2	(0)
2018–2019	Rustavi	6	(0)
2019	Vitebsk	22	(0)
2021–2022	VPK-Ahro Shevchenkivka	16	(0)
Total		337	(8)

International career
2002–2003	Georgia U17	4	(0)
2003–2004	Georgia U19	3	(2)
2004–2007	Georgia U21	10	(2)
2010–2014	Georgia	20	(0)
- * Club domestic league appearances and goals as of 24 January 2022

Akaki Khubutia (Georgian: აკაკი ხუბუტია; born 17 March 1986) is a Georgian former professional footballer who plays as a defender.

== Club career ==
On 3 September 2015, Zemplín Michalovce announced the signing of Georgian defender Akaki Khubutia.

In 2018, he played for Poli Timișoara in Romania.

== Honours ==
=== Club ===
FBK Kaunas

- A Lyga: 2007
- Lithuanian Cup: 2004, 2008
- Baltic League: 2008

Mordovia Saransk

- Russian National Football League: 2013–14
