= Igor Shitov =

Belarusian footballer

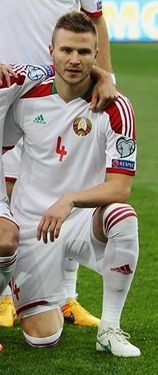
- Shitov in September 2015

Personal information
- Full name: Igor Sergeyevich Shitov
- Date of birth: 24 October 1986 (age 40)
- Place of birth: Polotsk, Belarusian SSR, USSR
- Height: 1.85 m (6 ft 1 in)
- Position: Right back

Team information
- Current team: Minsk (assistant coach)

Youth career
- 2002–2005: Dinamo Minsk

Senior career*
Years	Team	Apps	(Gls)
2002	Dinamo-BNTU Minsk	8	(0)
2003	RUOR Minsk	24	(2)
2006–2008	Torpedo Zhodino	78	(2)
2009–2011	BATE Borisov	60	(4)
2011–2013	Dynamo Moscow	3	(0)
2012–2013	→ Mordovia Saransk (loan)	20	(0)
2014–2016	Mordovia Saransk	44	(0)
2016–2018	Astana	41	(1)
2018–2021	Dinamo Minsk	47	(2)

International career
2004	Belarus U19	1	(0)
2006–2009	Belarus U21	23	(2)
2008–2019	Belarus	66	(1)

Managerial career
- 2022–2024: Krasnodar-2 (fitness coach)
- 2024–: Minsk (assistant)
- * Club domestic league appearances and goals

Igor Sergeyevich Shitov, sometimes written Ihar Shytaw (Belarusian: Ігар Сяргеевіч Шытаў; Russian: Игорь Серге́евич Шитов; born 24 October 1986) is a Belarusian football coach and a former right back. He is an assistant coach with Minsk.

== Career ==
=== Club ===
On 5 July 2016, Shitov signed a two-year contract with Kazakhstan Premier League side FC Astana. Shitov left Astana on 3 July 2018 when his contract expired.

On 16 July 2018, Shitov returned to FC Dinamo Minsk.

=== International ===
Shitov scored his only international goal against Finland in the 90+2nd minute in a friendly match held on 2 June 2008. The match ended in a 1–1 draw after Toni Kallio scored the equalizer in the 90+4th minute.

== Career statistics ==
=== Club ===
As of match played 24 June 2018

Appearances and goals by club, season and competition
Club	Season	League			National Cup		Continental		Other		Total	
Club	Season	Division	Apps	Goals	Apps	Goals	Apps	Goals	Apps	Goals	Apps	Goals
BATE Borisov	2009	Belarusian Premier League	22	1			10	0	-		32	0
BATE Borisov	2010	Belarusian Premier League	23	1	2	0	13	0	0	0	38	1
BATE Borisov	2011	Belarusian Premier League	15	2	0	0	3	0	1	0	19	2
BATE Borisov	Total		60	4			26	0	1	0	87	4
Dynamo Moscow	2011–12	Russian Premier League	2	0	1	0	-		-		3	0
Dynamo Moscow	2012–13	Russian Premier League	1	0	0	0	0	0	-		1	0
Dynamo Moscow	2013–14	Russian Premier League	0	0	0	0	-		-		0	0
Dynamo Moscow	Total		3	0	1	0	0	0	-	-	4	0
Mordovia Saransk (loan)	2012–13	Russian Premier League	20	0	1	0	–		-		21	0
Mordovia Saransk	2013–14	Russian National League	5	0	1	0	–		-		6	0
Mordovia Saransk	2014–15	Russian Premier League	22	0	3	0	–		-		25	0
Mordovia Saransk	2015–16	Russian Premier League	17	0	1	0	–		-		18	0
Mordovia Saransk	Total		44	0	5	0	-	-	-	-	49	0
Astana	2016	Kazakhstan Premier League	9	0	3	0	11	0	-		23	0
Astana	2017	Kazakhstan Premier League	27	1	1	0	12	0	1	0	41	1
Astana	2018	Kazakhstan Premier League	5	0	0	0	2	0	0	0	7	0
Astana	Total		41	1	4	0	25	0	1	0	71	1
Career total			168	5	13	0	51	0	2	0	234	5

=== International ===
Belarus national team
Year	Apps	Goals
2008	3	1
2009	9	0
2010	9	0
2011	10	0
2012	2	0
2013	4	0
2014	4	0
2015	6	0
2016	6	0
2017	1	0
2018	8	0
2019	4	0
Total	66	1

Statistics accurate as of match played 11 June 2019

=== International goals ===
#	Date	Venue	Opponent	Score	Result	Competition
1	2 June 2008	Veritas Stadion, Turku, Finland	Finland	1–0	1–1	Friendly

== Honours ==
BATE Borisov

- Belarusian Premier League: 2009, 2010, 2011
- Belarusian Cup: 2009–10
- Belarusian Super Cup: 2011

Astana

- Kazakhstan Premier League: 2016, 2017, 2018
- Kazakhstan Super Cup: 2018
