= Rustem Mukhametshin =

Russian footballer

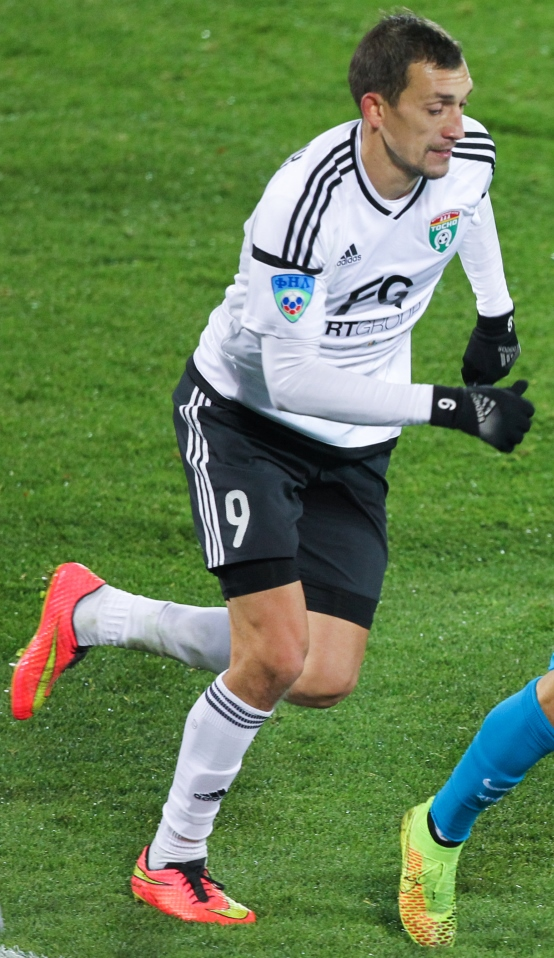
- Mukhametshin with FC Tosno in 2015

Personal information
- Full name: Rustem Nailevich Mukhametshin
- Date of birth: 2 April 1984 (age 42)
- Place of birth: Kazan, Russian SFSR
- Height: 1.83 m (6 ft 0 in)
- Positions: Midfielder; forward

Senior career*
Years	Team	Apps	(Gls)
2003–2008	FC Rubin-2 Kazan	146	(23)
2009	FC SOYUZ-Gazprom Izhevsk	14	(1)
2009–2015	FC Mordovia Saransk	147	(33)
2015–2018	FC Tosno	76	(6)
2018–2020	FC Mordovia Saransk	48	(1)
- * Club domestic league appearances and goals

Rustem Nailevich Mukhametshin (Tatar: Рөстәм Наил улы Мөхәммәтшин, Russian: Рустем Наилевич Мухаметшин; born 2 April 1984) is a Russian former professional football player. He played as a defensive midfielder.

== Club career ==
He made his Russian Premier League debut for FC Mordovia Saransk on 20 July 2012 in a game against FC Lokomotiv Moscow.

== Personal life ==
He is the younger brother of Ruslan Mukhametshin.

== Honours ==
=== Club ===
Tosno

- Russian Cup: 2017–18

== Career statistics ==
As of 13 May 2018

Club	Season	League			Cup		Continental		Total	
Club	Season	Division	Apps	Goals	Apps	Goals	Apps	Goals	Apps	Goals
Rubin Kazan	2003	Russian Premier League	0	0	0	0	–		0	0
Rubin-2 Kazan	2004	PFL	29	2	3	1	–		32	3
Rubin-2 Kazan	2005	PFL	35	8	1	0	–		36	8
Rubin-2 Kazan	2006	PFL	23	3	1	0	–		24	3
Rubin-2 Kazan	2007	PFL	26	1	1	0	–		27	1
Rubin-2 Kazan	2008	PFL	33	9	2	0	–		35	9
Rubin-2 Kazan	Total		146	23	8	1	0	0	154	24
SOYUZ-Gazprom Izhevsk	2009	PFL	14	1	1	1	–		15	2
Mordovia Saransk	2009	PFL	14	4	1	0	–		15	4
Mordovia Saransk	2010	FNL	34	9	1	1	–		35	10
Mordovia Saransk	2011–12	FNL	39	11	2	0	–		41	11
Mordovia Saransk	2012–13	Russian Premier League	24	1	2	0	–		26	1
Mordovia Saransk	2013–14	FNL	33	8	1	0	–		34	8
Mordovia Saransk	2014–15	Russian Premier League	3	0	2	1	–		5	1
Mordovia Saransk	Total		147	33	9	2	0	0	156	35
Tosno	2015–16	FNL	34	5	2	0	–		36	5
Tosno	2016–17	FNL	35	1	3	1	–		38	2
Tosno	2017–18	Russian Premier League	7	0	1	0	–		8	0
Tosno	Total		76	6	6	1	0	0	82	7
Career total			383	63	24	5	0	0	407	68
