= Maksim Rogov =

Russian footballer

Personal information
- Full name: Maksim Alekseyevich Rogov
- Date of birth: 11 February 1986 (age 40)
- Place of birth: Leningrad, Russian SFSR
- Height: 1.70 m (5 ft 7 in)
- Positions: Forward; midfielder

Senior career*
Years	Team	Apps	(Gls)
2003–2006	FC Zenit St. Petersburg	0	(0)
2007–2008	FC Metallurg-Kuzbass Novokuznetsk	71	(13)
2009–2010	FC Dynamo St. Petersburg	66	(9)
2011–2015	FC Mordovia Saransk	71	(6)
2014–2015	→ FC Dynamo St. Petersburg (loan)	27	(2)
2015–2018	FC Dynamo St. Petersburg	85	(21)
2018	FC KAMAZ Naberezhnye Chelny	11	(0)
- * Club domestic league appearances and goals

Maksim Alekseyevich Rogov (Russian: Максим Алексеевич Рогов; born 11 February 1986) is a Russian former professional football player.

== Club career ==
He played for the main squad of FC Zenit St. Petersburg in the Russian Cup.

Playing for FC Mordovia he became Football Championship of the National League 2011/12 winner.

== Honours ==
- 2016–17 Russian Professional Football League, Zone West best player.
