= Anton Bobyor =

Russian football midfielder

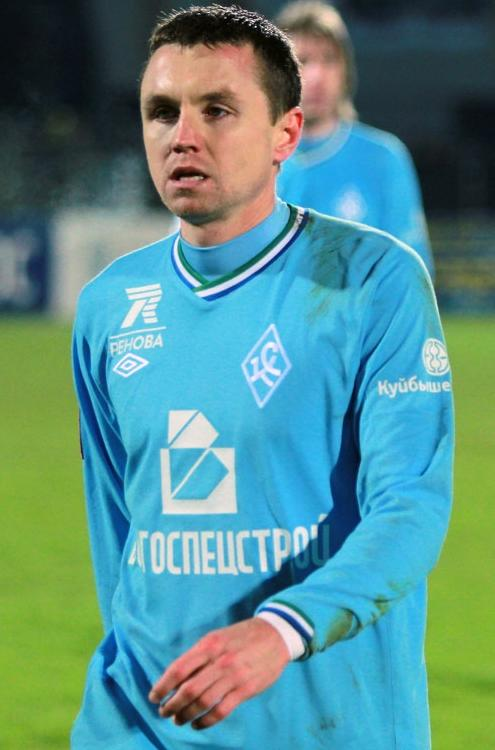
- Bobyor with Krylia Sovetov Samara in 2012

Personal information
- Full name: Anton Anatolyevich Bobyor
- Date of birth: 28 September 1982 (age 44)
- Place of birth: Naberezhnye Chelny, Russian SFSR
- Height: 1.82 m (6 ft 0 in)
- Position: Midfielder

Youth career
- 1989–1997: KAMAZ Naberezhnye Chelny

Senior career*
Years	Team	Apps	(Gls)
1998–1999	KAMAZ Naberezhnye Chelny	20	(3)
2000	Krylia Sovetov-2 Samara	12	(2)
2000–2012	Krylia Sovetov Samara	274	(29)
2012–2016	Mordovia Saransk	74	(13)
2018	Krylia Sovetov Samara	1	(0)
2017–2018	→ Krylia Sovetov-2 Samara	12	(0)

International career
2002–2003	Russia U-21	11	(1)
2002	Russia	1	(0)
- * Club domestic league appearances and goals

Anton Anatolyevich Bobyor (Russian: Антон Анатольевич Бобёр; born 28 September 1982) is a former Russian football midfielder who spent most of his career in PFC Krylia Sovetov Samara.

== Career ==
Bobyor spent twelve seasons with Krylia Sovetov Samara and has made the most Russian league appearances in club history (274).

== International career ==
Bobyor played his only international game for Russia on 27 March 2002 in a friendly against Estonia.

== Personal life ==
His son Ivan is a professional footballer.

== Career statistics ==
As of 4 November 2017

Club	Season	League			Cup		Continental		Total	
Club	Season	Division	Apps	Goals	Apps	Goals	Apps	Goals	Apps	Goals
KamAZ-Chally Naberezhnye Chelny	1998	FNL	1	0	0	0	–		1	0
KamAZ-Chally Naberezhnye Chelny	1999	PFL	19	3	1	0	–		20	3
KamAZ-Chally Naberezhnye Chelny	Total		20	3	1	0	0	0	21	3
Krylia Sovetov-2 Samara	2000	PFL	12	2	–		–		12	2
Krylia Sovetov Samara	2000	Russian Premier League	7	0	0	0	–		7	0
Krylia Sovetov Samara	2001	Russian Premier League	17	1	2	0	–		19	1
Krylia Sovetov Samara	2002	Russian Premier League	29	2	2	0	4	1	35	3
Krylia Sovetov Samara	2003	Russian Premier League	21	2	4	0	–		25	2
Krylia Sovetov Samara	2004	Russian Premier League	13	1	4	0	–		17	1
Krylia Sovetov Samara	2005	Russian Premier League	24	3	5	1	4	1	33	5
Krylia Sovetov Samara	2006	Russian Premier League	25	2	2	0	–		27	2
Krylia Sovetov Samara	2007	Russian Premier League	28	4	3	2	–		31	6
Krylia Sovetov Samara	2008	Russian Premier League	27	8	2	0	–		29	8
Krylia Sovetov Samara	2009	Russian Premier League	26	1	0	0	2	1	28	2
Krylia Sovetov Samara	2010	Russian Premier League	24	1	0	0	–		24	1
Krylia Sovetov Samara	2011–12	Russian Premier League	33	4	1	0	–		34	4
Krylia Sovetov Samara	Total		274	29	25	3	10	3	309	35
Mordovia Saransk	2012–13	Russian Premier League	26	3	1	0	–		27	3
Mordovia Saransk	2013–14	FNL	27	10	3	1	–		30	11
Mordovia Saransk	2014–15	Russian Premier League	11	0	1	0	–		12	0
Mordovia Saransk	2015–16	Russian Premier League	10	0	1	0	–		11	0
Mordovia Saransk	Total		74	13	6	1	0	0	80	14
Krylia Sovetov-2 Samara	2017–18	PFL	11	0	–		–		11	0
Krylia Sovetov-2 Samara	Total (2 spells)		23	2	0	0	0	0	23	2
Career total			391	47	32	4	10	3	433	54
