= Aleksandr Agapov =

Russian professional footballer

Personal information
- Full name: Aleksandr Gennadyevich Agapov
- Date of birth: 7 February 1982 (age 44)
- Place of birth: Maykop, Russian SFSR
- Height: 1.95 m (6 ft 5 in)
- Position: Goalkeeper

Senior career*
Years	Team	Apps	(Gls)
1999	FC Druzhba Maykop	0	(0)
2001	FC Krasnodar-2000	15	(0)
2002	FC Vityaz Krymsk	40	(0)
2003–2004	FC Krasnodar-2000	40	(2)
2004	FC Neftekhimik Nizhnekamsk	2	(0)
2005	FC Fakel Voronezh	0	(0)
2005	FC Krasnodar-2000	9	(0)
2006	FC Mashuk-KMV Pyatigorsk	0	(0)
2006	Dižvanagi Rēzekne	5	(0)
2007	FC Dynamo Stavropol	24	(0)
2008–2011	FC Chernomorets Novorossiysk	62	(0)
2011–2012	FC Mordovia Saransk	12	(0)
2012–2015	FC SKA-Energiya Khabarovsk	49	(0)
2015	FC KAMAZ Naberezhnye Chelny	12	(0)
2016–2017	FC Omega Kurganinsk		
- * Club domestic league appearances and goals

Aleksandr Gennadyevich Agapov (Russian: Александр Геннадьевич Агапов; born 7 February 1982) is a former Russian professional footballer.

== Club career ==
He played 8 seasons in the Russian Football National League for 5 different clubs.

== Honours ==
- Russian Second Division, Zone South best goalkeeper: 2010.
