= Lokomotiv Stadium (Perovo) =

Multi-use stadium in Moscow, Russia

Coordinates: 55.7407°N 37.7741°E

Lokomotiv Stadium (Perovo) is a multi-use stadium in Moscow, Russia. It is currently used mostly for football matches and is the home ground of youth teams of FC Lokomotiv Moscow. It was a home ground of Lokomotiv-2 Moscow during its existence and before foundation of FC Kazanka Moscow. Presently the stadium holds 1536 people. Its surface is an artificial pitch. The stadium is situated near the Perovo station of Moscow Metro.

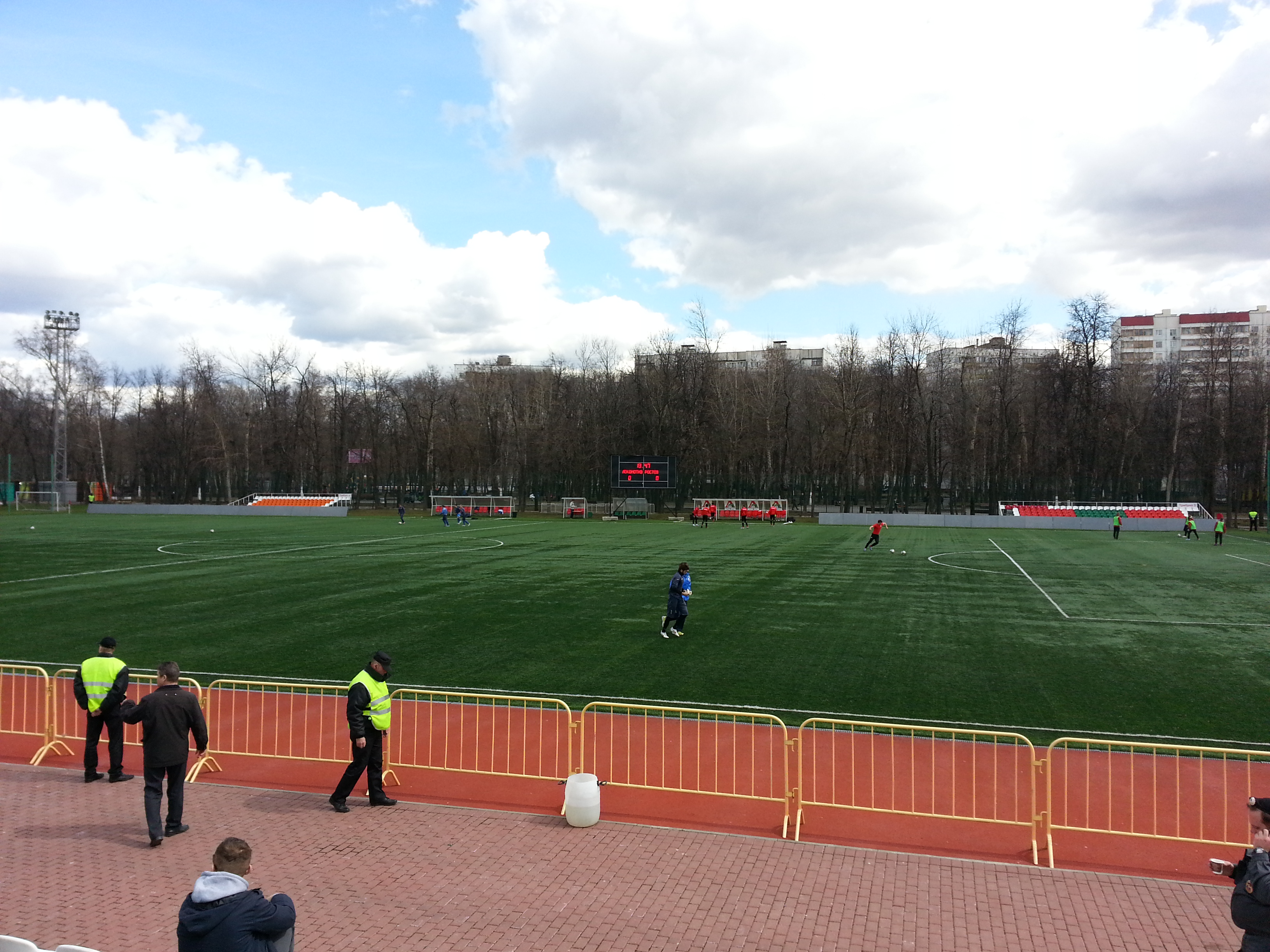
Lokomotiv Stadium
