= Vatutinki =

Vatutinki Вату́тинки
- Settlement
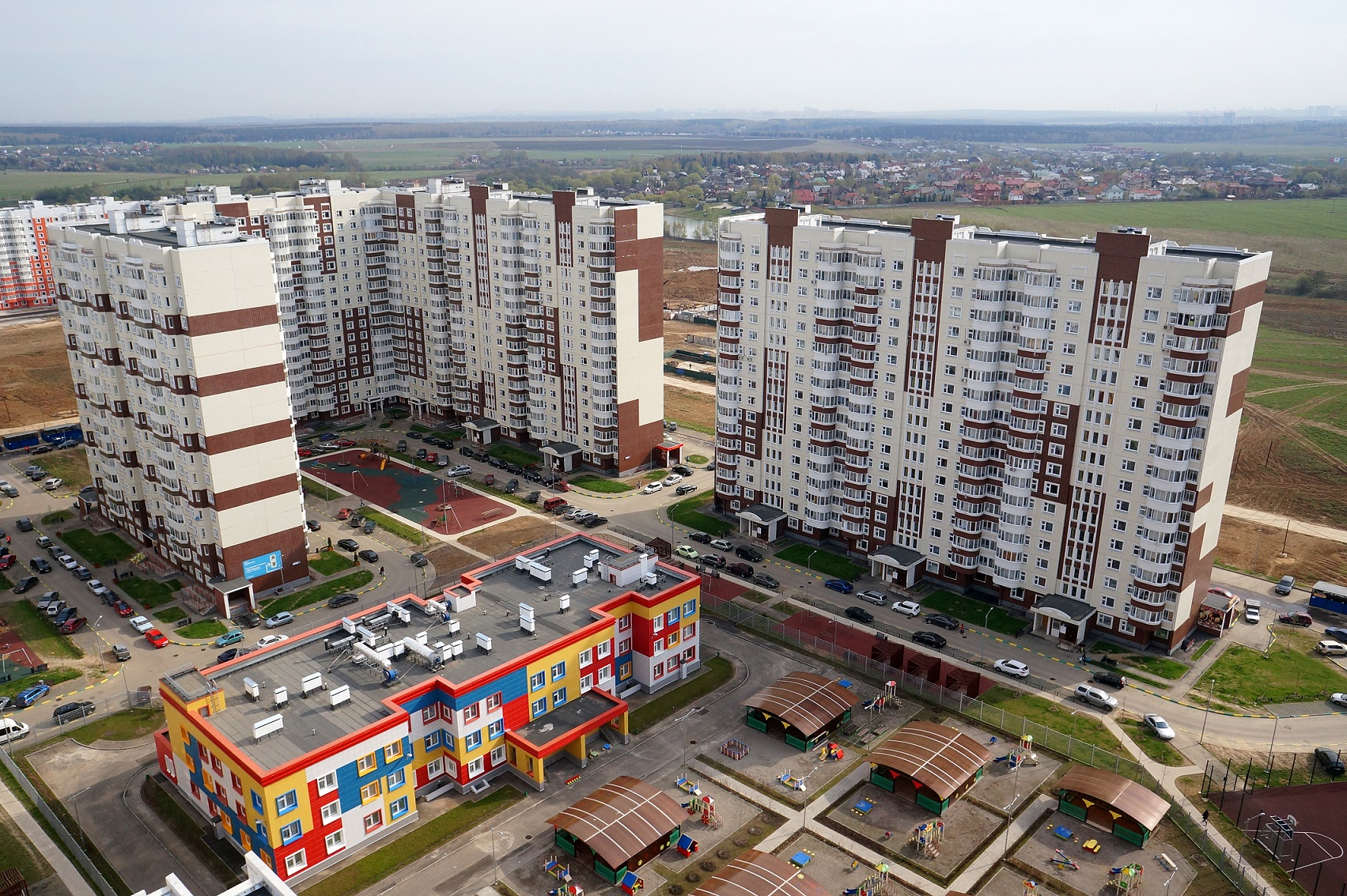

- Location within Moscow Location within Russia
- Coordinates: 55°30′5″N 37°20′3″E
- Country: Russia
- Region: Moscow
- District: Novomoskovsky Administrative Okrug
- Time zone: UTC+03:00

Vatutinki (Russian: Вату́тинки) is a rural locality (a village) in Novomoskovsky Administrative Okrug of the federal city of Moscow, Russia, located on the Desna River. Its population as of the 2010 Census was 11,081; up from 9,581 recorded in the 2002 Census.

Vatutinki was a part of Leninsky District of Moscow Oblast until July 1, 2012, when a part of that district was merged into Moscow.

The village is the location of a GRU base with Space Intelligence Directorate. It manages the Russian space reconnaissance program in coordination with the Fleet Intelligence Direction of the Fifth Directorate.
