= Maksim Budnikov =

Russian professional footballer

Personal information
- Full name: Maksim Vladimirovich Budnikov
- Date of birth: 31 May 1983 (age 43)
- Place of birth: Chamzinka, Mordovian ASSR, Russian SFSR
- Height: 1.84 m (6 ft 0 in)
- Position: Defender

Youth career
- Tsementnik Komsomolsky

Senior career*
Years	Team	Apps	(Gls)
2004	FC Biokhimik-Mordovia Saransk	31	(0)
2005–2006	FC Mordovia Saransk	65	(5)
2007	FC Krylia Sovetov Samara	5	(0)
2008–2009	FC Nosta Novotroitsk	57	(3)
2010–2014	FC Mordovia Saransk	72	(1)
2014–2015	FC Neftekhimik Nizhnekamsk	13	(0)
- * Club domestic league appearances and goals

Maksim Vladimirovich Budnikov (Russian: Максим Владимирович Будников; born 31 May 1983) is a Russian former professional footballer.

== Club career ==
He made his debut in the Russian Premier League in 2007 for FC Krylia Sovetov Samara.
