= Aleksandrs Cauņa =

Latvian footballer and coach

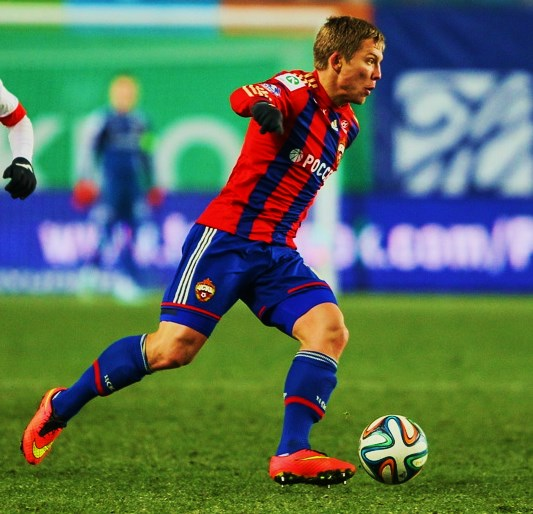
- Cauņa with CSKA Moscow in 2014

Personal information
- Date of birth: 19 January 1988 (age 38)
- Place of birth: Daugavpils, Latvian SSR, Soviet Union (now Republic of Latvia)
- Height: 1.75 m (5 ft 9 in)
- Position: Midfielder

Youth career
- 1995–2002: Dinaburg
- 2002–2005: Skonto Riga

Senior career*
Years	Team	Apps	(Gls)
2006	Olimps Riga	10	(2)
2006–2011	Skonto Riga	77	(16)
2009	→ Watford (loan)	5	(1)
2011	→ CSKA Moscow (loan)	4	(0)
2011–2017	CSKA Moscow	56	(3)
2017–2018	RFS	2	(0)
2020	FK Jelgava	1	(0)
Total		155	(22)

International career
2007–2015	Latvia	45	(12)
- * Club domestic league appearances and goals

Aleksandrs Cauņa (Latvian pronunciation: [ˈt͡sauɲa]; born 19 January 1988) is a Latvian former professional footballer who played as a midfielder.

== Career ==
=== Club ===
Born in Daugavpils, at youth level Cauņa played for Dinaburg, being brought to Skonto Riga system at the age of 14 in 2002, where he spent three years. In 2006, he joined the Latvian First League side Olimps Riga, playing 10 matches and scoring 2 goals. In 2006, he re-joined Skonto Riga and got a place in the starting eleven. He was named the best youth player in Latvia despite playing only half the season in 2006.

In January 2008 Cauņa was invited to join the Premier League club Chelsea on trial and he trained with the club's reserves. After the 2008 season, Cauņa was on trials at several Premier League clubs, including Blackburn Rovers and Sunderland, but any potential move eventually fell through as managers Paul Ince and Roy Keane left the clubs.

On 2 February 2009, he joined English Championship club Watford on loan until the end of the 2008–09 season, with a view to a permanent move. On 3 March he made his debut, coming on as a 74th-minute substitute for Jon Harley in the 2–1 defeat to Plymouth Argyle at Home Park. Cauņa scored his first Watford goal on his full debut for the club, firing a powerful half-volley in a 2–2 draw with Southampton at Vicarage Road on 7 April 2009. He returned to Skonto at the end of the season.

On 25 August 2010, he went on trial with English Premier League side Blackpool, playing in their Lancashire Senior Cup tie against Morecambe later the same day at Bloomfield Road, but did not stay with the club.

==== CSKA Moscow ====
At the start of 2011 Cauņa went on trial with the Russian Premier League side PFC CSKA Moscow, and on 1 February 2011 he was loaned to the club for four months. He made his debut on 17 February in the UEFA Europa League match against PAOK.

On 27 June 2011, CSKA bought out his rights from Skonto and he signed a five-year contract with CSKA. On 18 October 2011, Cauņa scored his first goal in the UEFA Champions League group stages in a 3–0 victory over Trabzonspor.

Cauņa scored his first Russian Premier League goal for CSKA on 19 August 2012 in a match against Mordovia Saransk. On 26 August 2012, Cauņa scored his second RPL goal against Krylia Sovetov Samara – a powerful blast from 30 metres, that was later highly rated and put him in the team of the week. On 26 September Cauņa and CSKA matched up against FC Tom Tomsk at the 1/16 stage of Russian Cup. CSKA came out with 1–0 win, with Cauņa being a goalscorer. He made an undeniable shot with left foot from outside the penalty area.

Cauņa left CSKA Moscow by mutual consent on 11 January 2017.

=== FK Jelgava ===
On 28 December 2018, it was announced that Cauna had signed with FK Jelgava as a coach, but he also wanted to return on the pitch some time as a player.

== International career ==
Cauņa was a vital member of the Latvia national team since his international debut in 2007. He scored his first two international goals in 2009 – in the 2010 FIFA World Cup qualification matches against Luxembourg (a 4–0 win) and Switzerland (a 2–2 draw). His third goal came on 11 August 2010 in a 4–1 friendly match defeat to Czech Republic. It was his first appearance after recovering from a serious injury and being out of football for almost six months. On 12 October he scored a last-minute bicycle kick to level against Georgia in a UEFA Euro 2012 qualifying match. In 2008, he helped the team win the Baltic Cup. As of 3 November 2013 he had made 40 appearances for Latvia, scoring 11 goals.

== Career statistics ==
=== Club ===
Appearances and goals by club, season and competition
Club	Season	League			National Cup		League Cup		Continental		Other		Total	
Club	Season	Division	Apps	Goals	Apps	Goals	Apps	Goals	Apps	Goals	Apps	Goals	Apps	Goals
Skonto Riga	2006	LMT Virslīga	10	2			–		1	0	–		11	2
Skonto Riga	2007	LMT Virslīga	22	4			–		1	0	–		23	4
Skonto Riga	2008	LMT Virslīga	22	1			–		0	0	–		22	1
Skonto Riga	2009	LMT Virslīga	11	4			–		2	0	–		13	4
Skonto Riga	2010	LMT Virslīga	12	5			–		0	0	–		12	5
Skonto Riga	2011	LMT Virslīga	0	0	0	0	–		0	0	–		0	0
Skonto Riga	Total		77	16			0	0	4	0	0	0	81	16
Watford (loan)	2008–09	Championship	5	1	0	0	0	0	–		–		5	1
CSKA Moscow (loan)	2011–12	Russian Premier League	4	0	0	0	–		0	0	–		4	0
CSKA Moscow	2011–12	Russian Premier League	13	0	1	0	–		7	1	–		21	1
CSKA Moscow	2012–13	Russian Premier League	25	3	4	1	–		2	0	–		31	4
CSKA Moscow	2013–14	Russian Premier League	4	0	0	0	–		1	0	0	0	5	0
CSKA Moscow	2014–15	Russian Premier League	5	0	1	0	–		2	0	0	0	8	0
CSKA Moscow	2015–16	Russian Premier League	9	0	2	1	–		2	0	0	0	13	1
CSKA Moscow	2016–17	Russian Premier League	0	0	0	0	–		0	0	0	0	0	0
CSKA Moscow	Total		56	3	8	2	0	0	14	1	0	0	78	6
RFS	2017	Latvian Higher League	2	0	0	0	–		–		–		2	0
FK Jelgava	2020	Latvian Higher League	1	0	0	0	–		–		–		1	0
Career total			145	20	8	2	0	0	18	1	0	0	171	23

=== International ===
Appearances and goals by national team and year
National team	Year	Apps	Goals
Latvia	2007	3	0
Latvia	2008	6	0
Latvia	2009	7	2
Latvia	2010	5	2
Latvia	2011	7	3
Latvia	2012	7	2
Latvia	2013	4	1
Latvia	2014	1	0
Latvia	2015	4	1
Latvia	2016	0	0
Latvia	2017	0	0
Total		44	11

Scores and results list Latvia's goal tally first, score column indicates score after each Cauņa goal.

List of international goals scored by Aleksandrs Cauņa
No.	Date	Venue	Opponent	Score	Result	Competition
1	28 March 2009	Stade Josy Barthel, Luxembourg	Luxembourg	2–0	4–0	2010 FIFA World Cup qualification
2	9 September 2009	Skonto Stadium, Riga, Latvia	Switzerland	1–1	2–2	2010 FIFA World Cup qualification
3	11 August 2010	Stadion u Nisy, Liberec, Czech Republic	Czech Republic	1–4	1–4	Friendly
4	12 October 2010	Skonto Stadium, Riga, Latvia	Georgia	1–1	1–1	UEFA Euro 2012 qualifying
5	4 June 2011	Skonto Stadium, Riga, Latvia	Israel	1–2	1–2	UEFA Euro 2012 qualifying
6	2 September 2011	Mikheil Meskhi Stadium, Tbilisi, Georgia	Georgia	1–0	1–0	UEFA Euro 2012 qualifying
7	6 September 2011	Skonto Stadium, Riga, Latvia	Greece	1–0	1–1	UEFA Euro 2012 qualifying
8	1 June 2012	Võru Stadium, Võru, Estonia	Lithuania	1–0	5–0	2012 Baltic Cup
9	7 September 2012	Skonto Stadium, Riga, Latvia	Greece	1–0	1–2	2014 FIFA World Cup qualification
10	22 March 2013	Rheinpark Stadion, Vaduz, Liechtenstein	Liechtenstein	1–1	1–1	2014 FIFA World Cup qualification
11	10 October 2015	Laugardalsvöllur, Reykjavík, Iceland	Iceland	2–1	2–2	UEFA Euro 2016 qualifying

=== Non-FIFA International goals ===
#	Date	Venue	Opponent	Score	Result	Competition
1	9 February 2011	Mardan Sports Complex, Antalya, Turkey	Bolivia	1–1	2–1	Friendly

== Honours ==
Skonto Riga

- Virsliga: 2010

CSKA Moscow

- Russian Premier League: 2012–13, 2013–14, 2015–16
- Russian Cup: 2011, 2013
- Russian Super Cup: 2013

Latvia

- Baltic Cup: 2008, 2012

Individual

- Latvian Higher League young footballer of the season: 2006
- Latvian Young Footballer of the Year: 2006, 2007, 2008
- Latvian Footballer of the Year: 2011, 2012
