= Maksim Zhestkov =

Russian footballer

Personal information
- Full name: Maksim Dmitriyevich Zhestkov
- Date of birth: 21 April 1993 (age 33)
- Place of birth: Saransk, Russia
- Height: 1.80 m (5 ft 11 in)
- Positions: Midfielder; forward

Senior career*
Years	Team	Apps	(Gls)
2010–2012	Mordovia Saransk	19	(0)
2013–2014	Braga B	12	(0)
2014–2015	Khimki	18	(1)
2015–2016	Syzran-2003	21	(2)
2016–2017	KAMAZ Naberezhnye Chelny	20	(2)
2017–2018	Mordovia Saransk	7	(0)
2018–2019	Murom	20	(2)
2019	Kolomna	2	(0)
2019–2020	Mashuk-KMV Pyatigorsk	20	(0)

International career
2010	Russia U17	8	(5)
2011	Russia U18	7	(3)
2011	Russia U19	4	(1)
2013	Russia U20	1	(0)
- * Club domestic league appearances and goals

Maksim Dmitriyevich Zhestkov (Russian: Максим Дмитриевич Жестков; born 21 April 1993) is a Russian former footballer.

== Club career ==
He made his Russian Football National League debut for FC Mordovia Saransk on 9 July 2010 in a game against FC Volga Nizhny Novgorod.
