= Start Stadium (Saransk) =

Football stadium in Saransk, Russia

Coordinates: 54.175837°N 45.192175°E

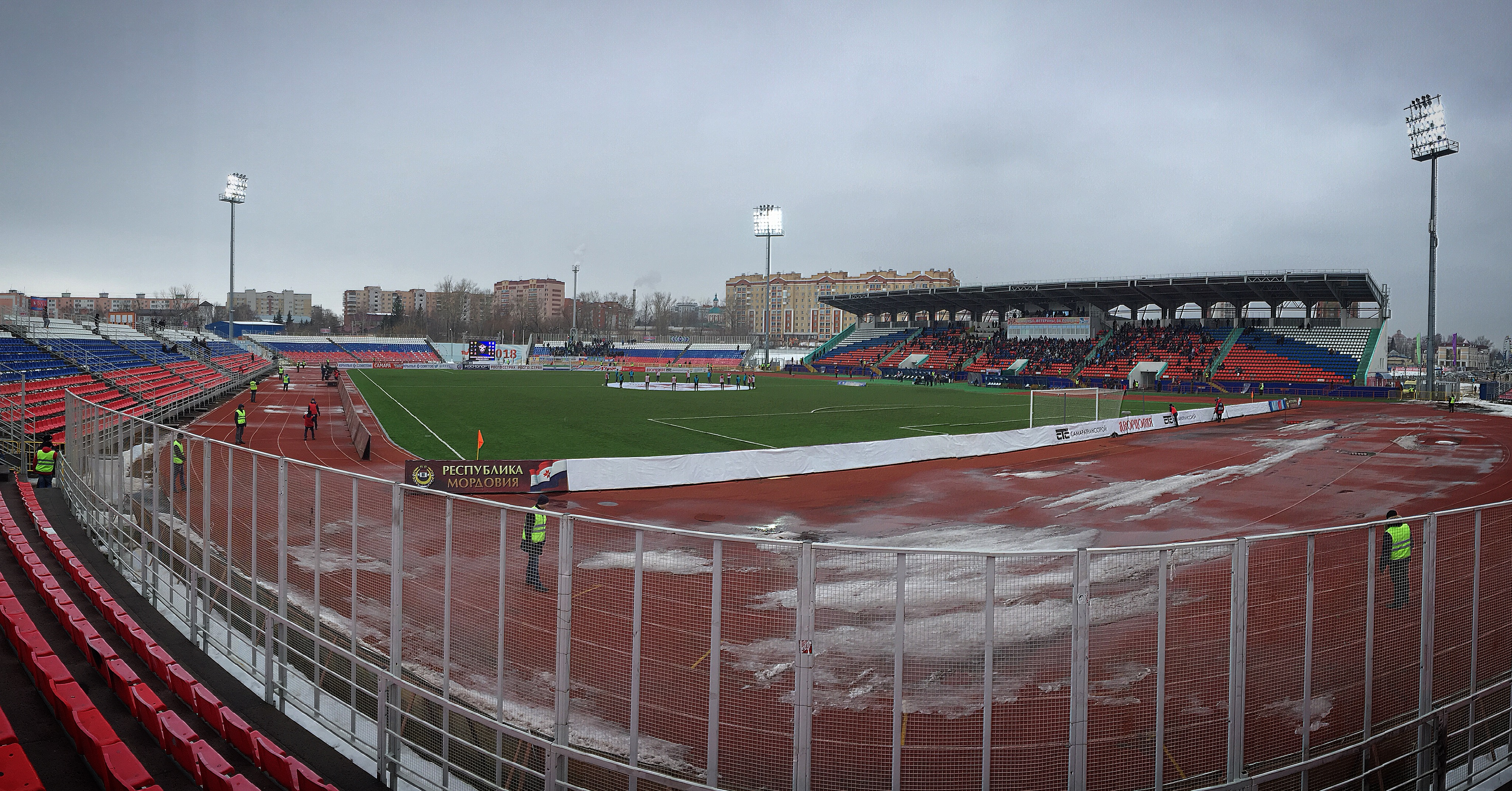
- Interactive map of Start Stadium
- Full name: Start Stadium
- Location: Saransk, Russia
- Capacity: 11,613
- Surface: Grass

Construction
- Opened: 2004
- Demolished: 2010

Tenant
- FC Mordovia Saransk

Start Stadium (Russian: «Старт») was a stadium in Saransk, Russia. It had a capacity of 11,613 spectators and it was the home stadium of FC Mordovia Saransk of the Russian Premier League.
