= Ruslan Mukhametshin =

Russian footballer and coach

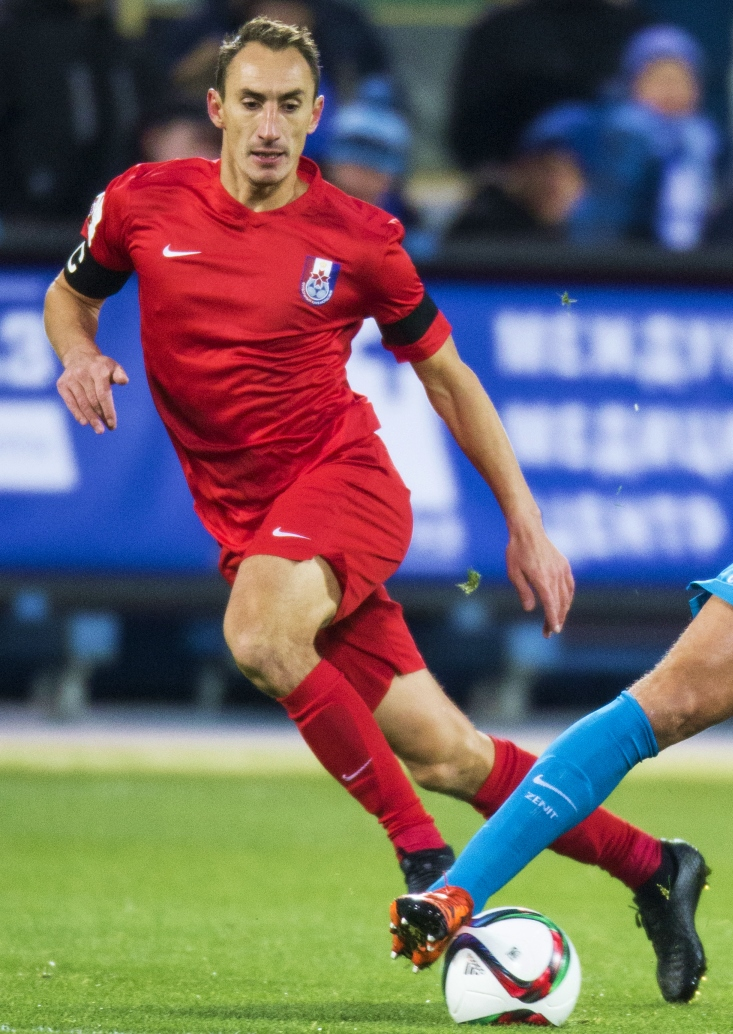
- Mukhametshin with Mordovia in 2015

Personal information
- Full name: Ruslan Nailevich Mukhametshin
- Date of birth: 29 October 1981 (age 45)
- Place of birth: Kazan, Russian SFSR
- Height: 1.78 m (5 ft 10 in)
- Position: Forward

Team information
- Current team: FC Mordovia Saransk (assistant coach)

Youth career
- Rubin Kazan

Senior career*
Years	Team	Apps	(Gls)
2005–2008	Rubin-2 Kazan	111	(30)
2009	SOYUZ-Gazprom Izhevsk	15	(10)
2009–2013	Mordovia Saransk	139	(71)
2013–2015	Rubin Kazan	8	(1)
2014–2015	→ Mordovia Saransk (loan)	17	(3)
2015–2016	Mordovia Saransk	28	(6)
2016	Arsenal Tula	10	(0)
2017	Taraz	11	(3)
2017–2019	Mordovia Saransk	49	(19)

Managerial career
- 2019–: Mordovia Saransk (assistant)
- * Club domestic league appearances and goals

Ruslan Nailevich Mukhametshin (Tatar: Руслан Наил улы Мөхәммәтшин, Russian: Руслан Наилевич Мухаметшин; born 29 October 1981) is a Russian professional football coach and a former player. He is an assistant coach for FC Mordovia Saransk.

== Career ==
=== Club ===
==== Rubin Kazan ====
The day after signing, he made the match squad for Rubin's trip to FC Ural Sverdlovsk Oblast, baring the number 81 shirt. However, he remained on the bench for the entire game.

== Personal life ==
Mukhametshin's younger brother Rustem is also a professional footballer, currently playing for FC Tosno.

== Honours ==
- Russian Second Division, Zone Ural-Povolzhye top scorer: 2009 (19 goals).
- Russian Second Division, Zone Ural-Povolzhye best player and best striker: 2009.
- Football Championship of the National League winner: 2011/12
- Football Championship of the National League top scorer (31 goals): 2011/12
