= 2013–14 Russian Football National League =

Russian National Football League
- Season: 2013–14
- Champions: Mordovia Saransk
- Promoted: Mordovia Saransk; Arsenal Tula; Torpedo Moscow; Ufa
- Relegated: Neftekhimik Nizhnekamsk; Angusht Nazran; Salyut Belgorod withdrew Alania Vladikavkaz withdrew Spartak Nalchik withdrew Rotor Volgograd withdrew
- Top goalscorer: Aleksandr Kutyin (19)

The 2013–14 Russian National Football League was the 22nd season of Russia's second-tier football league since the dissolution of the Soviet Union. The season began on 7 July 2013 and ended on 11 May 2014.

== Teams ==
Location of the teams participating in the 2013–14 season

== League table ==
Pos	Team	Pld	W	D	L	GF	GA	GD	Pts	Promotion or relegation
1	Mordovia Saransk (C, P)	36	22	7	7	59	30	+29	73	Promotion to Russian Premier League
2	Arsenal Tula (P)	36	21	6	9	62	39	+23	69	Promotion to Russian Premier League
3	Torpedo Moscow (P)	36	19	8	9	45	22	+23	65	Qualification for promotion play-offs
4	Ufa (P)	36	17	10	9	46	35	+11	61 (Note: Head-to-head record: Ufa – Gazovik 1–0, Gazovik – Ufa 0–0.)	Qualification for promotion play-offs
5	Gazovik Orenburg	36	17	10	9	46	28	+18	61	
6	Shinnik Yaroslavl	36	17	6	13	47	37	+10	57	
7	SKA-Khabarovsk	36	15	11	10	43	34	+9	56	
8	Luch-Energiya Vladivostok	36	15	10	11	40	25	+15	55	
9	Baltika Kaliningrad	36	14	12	10	39	31	+8	54	
10	Spartak Nalchik (R)	36	13	12	11	36	34	+2	51 (Note: Head-to-head record: Spartak Nalchik – Sibir 2–0, Sibir – Spartak Nalchik 0–0.)	Relegation to Professional Football League (Note: Spartak Nalchik withdrew from the league on 29 May 2014 due to financial problems. Rotor Volgograd withdrew from the league on 17 June 2014.)
11	Sibir Novosibirsk	36	13	12	11	38	39	−1	51	
12	Alania Vladikavkaz (R)	36	14	4	18	29	52	−23	46	Team withdrew during winter break (Note: Alania and Salyut withdrew from the league in February 2014 due to financial problems.)
13	Yenisey Krasnoyarsk	36	12	9	15	40	47	−7	45	
14	Dynamo St. Petersburg	36	12	7	17	38	46	−8	43	
15	Rotor Volgograd (R)	36	10	11	15	43	40	+3	41	Relegation to Professional Football League
16	Khimik Dzerzhinsk	36	10	7	19	29	49	−20	37	
17	Neftekhimik Nizhnekamsk (R)	36	7	12	17	38	45	−7	33	Relegation to Professional Football League
18	Salyut Belgorod (R)	36	6	9	21	23	53	−30	27	Team withdrew during winter break
19	Angusht Nazran (R)	36	3	5	28	23	78	−55	14	Relegation to Professional Football League

Source: FNL, Soccerway
Rules for classification: 1st points; 2nd matches won; 3rd head-to-head (points, matches won, goal difference, goals scored, away goals scored); 4th goal difference; 5th goals scored; 6th away goals scored
(C) Champions; (P) Promoted; (R) Relegated

== Results ==
Home \ Away	ALA	ANG	ARS	BAL	DSP	GAZ	KHI	LUE	MOR	NEF	ROT	SAL	SHI	SIB	SKA	SPN	TOR	UFA	YEN
Alania Vladikavkaz		1–0	2–0	1–0	3–1	3–0	4–0	0–0	0–3	2–1	2–1		0–3	0–3	0–3	1–0	0–3	0–3	2–1
Angusht Nazran	1–0		1–3	1–2	2–0	0–1	2–1	0–2	0–0	1–1	0–2	1–1	0–2	2–2	0–1	1–2	0–2	0–1	1–2
Arsenal Tula	3–0	3–0		1–1	0–1	2–0	1–0	0–3	0–0	2–1	4–0	3–0	4–0	2–0	5–1	3–2	1–0	1–0	1–2
Baltika Kaliningrad	0–1	1–0	2–1		2–1	2–0	1–1	1–0	2–0	1–0	0–2	3–0	2–2	0–0	3–0	1–0	0–0	1–1	0–0
Dynamo St. Petersburg	3–0	4–0	0–1	2–0		0–1	1–2	1–1	0–3	0–3	0–0	3–0	0–0	1–0	0–0	0–0	2–3	2–0	4–2
Gazovik Orenburg	3–0	5–0	2–2	2–0	2–1		2–0	1–0	1–2	1–1	0–0	3–0	2–0	0–0	2–1	4–0	0–2	0–0	2–2
Khimik Dzerzhinsk	3–0	4–0	1–1	1–1	1–2	2–0		1–0	0–1	0–0	1–0	1–0	0–2	1–2	0–1	3–2	0–3	1–2	1–0
Luch-Energiya Vladivostok	3–0	1–0	0–3	1–1	0–1	1–4	2–0		1–1	0–0	2–1	1–1	0–1	3–0	1–0	1–0	0–0	1–0	4–0
Mordovia Saransk	0–0	3–0	0–1	1–0	4–1	1–0	4–0	1–0		2–2	2–0	1–0	4–2	2–0	1–0	3–0	1–0	2–2	3–0
Neftekhimik Nizhnekamsk	1–2	5–1	2–3	0–1	1–0	0–1	2–1	0–2	0–1		2–1	1–3	1–2	4–0	1–3	0–0	0–0	1–1	3–2
Rotor Volgograd	3–0	3–0	1–1	1–2	3–1	1–1	3–0	0–2	1–1	0–0		3–0	2–0	0–2	1–2	2–2	1–2	1–1	1–0
Salyut Belgorod	0–1	3–0	3–0	2–1	1–1	1–1	0–0	0–3	0–3	0–0	1–0		4–0	0–3	0–3	0–3	0–3	1–2	1–1
Shinnik Yaroslavl	1–0	4–2	5–0	1–1	0–1	0–1	4–0	1–0	3–0	3–0	1–0	0–0		2–0	1–2	2–1	2–1	1–0	0–0
Sibir Novosibirsk	1–1	1–1	0–3	1–1	0–2	1–1	2–0	1–1	4–2	2–1	2–2	1–0	1–0		0–1	0–0	2–1	1–0	1–0
SKA-Khabarovsk	0–1	2–1	3–0	2–1	1–1	2–0	1–1	1–1	0–1	1–1	0–0	0–0	3–0	2–1		1–1	0–0	2–2	2–2
Spartak Nalchik	1–1	3–1	0–0	1–1	3–0	0–1	0–0	1–3	1–0	2–1	1–1	1–0	1–0	2–0	2–1		0–0	0–0	1–0
Torpedo Moscow	2–0	4–2	2–0	1–0	2–0	0–2	0–1	2–0	4–2	2–1	1–0	2–1	1–0	0–0	1–0	1–2		0–0	0–0
Ufa	2–1	2–1	3–4	3–2	3–0	1–0	2–1	0–0	3–0	1–1	3–2	1–0	2–1	0–3	2–0	0–1	1–0		1–0
Yenisey Krasnoyarsk	3–0	4–1	1–3	0–2	2–1	0–0	1–0	1–0	2–4	1–0	1–4	3–0	1–1	1–1	0–1	1–0	1–0	3–1	

Source: Soccerway
Legend: Blue = home team win; Yellow = draw; Red = away team win.

== Statistics ==
=== Top goalscorers ===
Source: 1fnl.ru (in Russian)

Rank	Player	Team	Goals
1	(Russia) Aleksandr Kutyin	Arsenal Tula	19
2	(Russia) Dmitri Golubov	Ufa	14
3	(Ukraine) Ilya Mikhalyov	Neftekhimik Nizhnekamsk	12
4	(Russia) Aleksei Ivanov	Mordovia Saransk	11
5	(Russia) Anton Bobyor	Mordovia Saransk	10
6	(Brazil) Nathan Júnior	SKA-Khabarovsk	9
6	(Russia) Denis Tkachuk	Gazovik Orenburg	9
6	(Russia) Yevgeny Savin	Luch-Energiya	9
6	(Russia) Vladislav Ryzhkov	Arsenal Tula	9

== Events ==
During winter break 2013-2014, Salyut experienced huge financial difficulties. Almost all contracts with first-team players were terminated by mutual consent. As a result, on 14 February 2014, the club officially withdrew from competition in Russian National Football League.
