= 2020–21 BB Erzurumspor season =

BB Erzurumspor
2020–21 season
- Chairman: Hüseyin Üneş
- Manager: Mehmet Özdilek (until 30 November 2020); Hüseyin Çimşir (from 2 December 2020 to 21 December 2020); Mesut Bakkal (from 25 December 2020)
- Stadium: Kazım Karabekir Stadium
- Süper Lig: 18th
- Turkish Cup: Round of 16
- Top goalscorer: League: Ricardo Gomes; Oltan Karakullukçu; Arvydas Novikovas (4 each); All: Ricardo Gomes; Jugurtha Hamroun; Oltan Karakullukçu; Arvydas Novikovas (4 each)
Home colours	Away colours	Third colours

The 2020–21 season is Büyükşehir Belediye Erzurumspor's 16th season in existence and the club's first season back in the top flight of Turkish football. In addition to the domestic league, BB Erzurumspor will participate in this season's edition of the Turkish Cup. The season covers the period from July 2020 to 30 June 2021.

== Players ==
=== First-team squad ===
As of 13 January 2021

Note: Flags indicate national team as defined under FIFA eligibility rules; some limited exceptions apply. Players may hold more than one non-FIFA nationality.

No.	Pos.	Nation	Player
1	GK	TUR	Göktuğ Bakırbaş
2	DF	UKR	Bohdan Butko
4	MF	FRA	Gabriel Obertan
5	DF	TUR	Hasan Hatipoğlu
8	MF	KEN	Johanna Omolo
11	MF	LTU	Arvydas Novikovas
13	MF	CMR	Petrus Boumal
15	MF	KOS	Elbasan Rashani
16	MF	TUR	Rahman Buğra Çağıran
17	MF	TUR	Emrah Başsan
20	MF	SUR	Mitchell Donald
21	DF	MAR	Zakarya Bergdich
22	DF	FRA	Léo Schwechlen

No.	Pos.	Nation	Player
23	DF	TUR	Gökhan Kardeş
28	DF	ECU	Arturo Mina
29	GK	POL	Jakub Szumski
30	DF	CMR	Adolphe Teikeu
33	GK	TUR	Kayacan Erdoğan
55	DF	TUR	Özgür Sert
57	GK	TUR	Batuhan Ünsal
61	FW	TUR	Oltan Karakullukçu
77	DF	TUR	Mehmet Murat Uçar
88	DF	TUR	Osman Çelik
89	MF	GHA	Yaw Ackah (on loan from Kayserispor)
91	FW	CPV	Ricardo Gomes (on loan from Sharjah)
99	MF	TUR	Cenk Ahmet Alkılıç

=== Out on loan ===
Note: Flags indicate national team as defined under FIFA eligibility rules; some limited exceptions apply. Players may hold more than one non-FIFA nationality.

No.	Pos.	Nation	Player
—	MF	TUR	Sefa Akgün (at 24 Erzincanspor)
—	MF	MLI	Mahamadou Ba (at Bandırmaspor)
—	MF	TUR	Osman Şahin (at Ofspor)

== Transfers ==
=== In ===
No.	Pos	Player	Transferred from	Fee	Date	Source
15			TBD		1 July 2020	

=== Out ===
No.	Pos	Player	Transferred to	Fee	Date	Source
15			TBD		1 July 2020	

== Pre-season and friendlies ==
Win Draw Loss Fixtures

== Competitions ==
=== Overview ===
Competition	First match	Last match	Starting round	Final position	Record							
Competition	First match	Last match	Starting round	Final position	Pld	W	D	L	GF	GA	GD	Win %
Süper Lig	13 September 2020	8 May 2021	Matchday 1		38	9	10	19	41	65	−24	23.68
Turkish Cup	3 November 2020	14 January 2021	Second round	Round of 16	4	3	0	1	15	9	+6	75.00
Total					42	12	10	20	56	74	−18	28.57

Last updated: 3 May 2021
Source: TFF.org

=== Süper Lig ===
==== League table ====
Pos	Team	Pld	W	D	L	GF	GA	GD	Pts	Qualification or relegation
16	Antalyaspor	40	9	17	14	41	55	−14	44	
17	Kayserispor	40	9	14	17	35	52	−17	41	
18	BB Erzurumspor (R)	40	10	10	20	44	68	−24	40	Relegation to TFF First League
19	Ankaragücü (R)	40	10	8	22	46	65	−19	38	Relegation to TFF First League
20	Gençlerbirliği (R)	40	10	8	22	44	76	−32	38	Relegation to TFF First League

Source: Süper Lig, Soccerway
Rules for classification: 1) Points; 2) Head-to-head points; 3) Head-to-head goal difference; 4) Head-to-head goals scored; 5) Goal difference; 6) Goals scored; 7) Play-off.
(R) Relegated

==== Results summary ====
Overall								Home						Away					
Pld	W	D	L	GF	GA	GD	Pts	W	D	L	GF	GA	GD	W	D	L	GF	GA	GD
38	9	10	19	41	65	−24	37	2	8	9	18	29	−11	7	2	10	23	36	−13

Last updated: 3 May 2021.
Source: TFF.org

==== Results by round ====
Round	1	2	3	4	5	6	7	8	9	10	11	12	13	14	15	16	17	18	19	20	21	22	23	24	25	26	27	28	29	30	31	32	33	34	35	36	37	38	39	40	41	42
Ground	A	H	A	H	A	H	A	H	A	H	A	H	A	H	A	H	A	H	A	H	B	H	A	H	A	H	A	H	A	H	A	H	A	H	A	H	A	H	A	H	A	B
Result	W	L	W	D	L	L	L	D	L	D	L	L	L	L	W	D	L	L	W	D	B	W	D	D	W	L	L	D	L	D	L	L	D	L	W	W	W	L	L			B
Position	8	10	6	5	9	15	15	16	17	17	18	19	21	21	20	20	21	21	19	20	20	18	18	18	17	17	18	18	19	19	19	20	20	20	19	19	18	19				

Updated to match(es) played on 3 May 2021. Source: TFF.org
A = Away; H = Home; B = Bye; W = Win; D = Draw; L = Loss

Note: Since the league has been expanded to 21 teams each team will earn a bye twice this season.

==== Matches ====
13 September 2020 1	Ankaragücü	1–2	BB Erzurumspor	Ankara
17:00 TRT (UTC+3)	Bolingi 61'	Report	Karakullukçu 75', 79'	Stadium: Eryaman Stadium; Attendance: 0 Referee: Burak Şeker

20 September 2020 2	BB Erzurumspor	1–2	Sivasspor	Erzurum
13:30 TRT (UTC+3)	Novikovas 70'	Report	Koné 82'; Gradel 86'	Stadium: Kazım Karabekir Stadium; Attendance: 0 Referee: Serkan Tokat

26 September 2020 3	Kayserispor	1–3	BB Erzurumspor	Kayseri
13:30 TRT (UTC+3)	Henrique 83' (pen.)	Report	Muhammed 42'; Novikovas 45+4'; Sissoko 90+5'	Stadium: Kadir Has Stadium; Attendance: 0 Referee: Tugay Kaan Numanoğlu

3 October 2020 4	BB Erzurumspor	0–0	Çaykur Rizespor	Erzurum
16:00 TRT (UTC+3)		Report		Stadium: Kazım Karabekir Stadium; Attendance: 0 Referee: Umit Öztürk

24 October 2020 6	BB Erzurumspor	1–2	Galatasaray	Erzurum
19:00 TRT (UTC+3)	Novikovas 45' (pen.)	Report	Emre 20'; Falcao 64'; Falcao (yellow card) 6' (yellow-red card) 73'; Ömer (yellow card) 70'; Arda (yellow card) 77'	Stadium: Kazım Karabekir Stadium; Attendance: 0 Referee: Arda Kardeşler

30 October 2020 7	Fatih Karagümrük	5–1	BB Erzurumspor	Istanbul
20:00 TRT (UTC+3)	Ndiaye 11', 45+4'; Balkovec (yellow card) 15'; Biglia 28' (pen.); Ndao 71'; Sabo 90+1'	Report	Mina (yellow card) 21'; Gomes 90'	Stadium: Atatürk Olympic Stadium; Attendance: 0 Referee: Fırat Aydınus

7 November 2020 8	BB Erzurumspor	1–1	Göztepe	Erzurum
16:00 TRT (UTC+3)		Report		Stadium: Kazım Karabekir Stadium; Attendance: 0 Referee: Cüneyt Çakır

22 November 2020 9	Trabzonspor	1–0	BB Erzurumspor	Trabzon
19:00 TRT (UTC+3)	Ekuban 23'; Afobe (yellow card) 50'; Lewis Baker (yellow card) 77'	Report	Murat Uçar (yellow card) 11'; Mina (yellow card) 20'; Erdoğan (yellow card) 64'	Stadium: Şenol Güneş Stadium; Attendance: 0 Referee: Erkan Özdamar

29 November 2020 10	BB Erzurumspor	2–2	Antalyaspor	Erzurum
13:30 TRT (UTC+3)	Kanak 29', (yellow card) 32'; Mina (yellow card) 59'; Donald (yellow card) 80'; Gomes 85'	Report	Sarı 60'; Bayrakdar 65'; Naldo (yellow card) 82' (yellow-red card) 89'; Albayrak (yellow card) 84'	Stadium: Kazım Karabekir Stadium; Attendance: 0 Referee: Ali Şansalan

5 December 2020 11	Konyaspor	2–0	BB Erzurumspor	Konya
16:00 TRT (UTC+3)		Report		Stadium: Konya Büyükşehir Stadium; Attendance: 0 Referee: Halis Özkahya

9 December 2020 5	Hatayspor	3–0	BB Erzurumspor	Antakya
19:30 TRT (UTC+3)	Diouf 40'; Çelik 47' (o.g.); David 58'	Report		Stadium: Hatay New Stadium; Attendance: 0 Referee: Sarper Baris Saka
Note: Match was postponed due to COVID-19.

13 December 2020 12	BB Erzurumspor	0–1	Gençlerbirliği	Erzurum
13:30 TRT (UTC+3)		Report		Stadium: Kazım Karabekir Stadium; Attendance: 0 Referee: Alper Ulusoy

20 December 2020 13	Beşiktaş	4–0	BB Erzurumspor	Istanbul
19:00 TRT (UTC+3)	Bernard (yellow card) 12'; Uysal (yellow card) 38'; Aboubakar 59' (pen.), 71'; Nkoudou 63'; Vida 69', (yellow card) 78'	Report	Akdağ (yellow card) 36'; Muhammed (yellow card) 80'	Stadium: Vodafone Park; Attendance: 0 Referee: Halil Umut Meler

23 December 2020 14	BB Erzurumspor	1–2	Denizlispor	Erzurum
16:00 TRT (UTC+3)	Donald (yellow card) 45'; Başsan 69'; Kardeş (yellow card) 82'; Kanak (yellow card) 89'	Report	Rodallega 36', 55'; Sacko (yellow card) 43'; Mešanović (yellow card) 90'	Stadium: Kazım Karabekir Stadium; Attendance: 0 Referee: Hüseyin Göçek

27 December 2020 15	Yeni Malatyaspor	1–3	BB Erzurumspor	Malatya
16:00 TRT (UTC+3)	Acquah 62'	Report	Gomes 44'; Donald 67'; Obertan 71'	Stadium: Malatya Arena; Attendance: 0 Referee: Mustafa Öğretmenoğlu

2 January 2021 16	BB Erzurumspor	1–1	Gaziantep	Erzurum
13:30 TRT (UTC+3)	Başsan 90+6' (pen.)	Report	Mirallas 69'	Stadium: Kazım Karabekir Stadium; Attendance: 0 Referee: Tugay Kaan Numanoğlu

6 January 2021 17	İstanbul Başakşehir	1–0	BB Erzurumspor	Istanbul
16:00 TRT (UTC+3)	Gulbrandsen 40'	Report		Stadium: Başakşehir Fatih Terim Stadium; Attendance: 0 Referee: Yaşar Kemal Uğurlu

11 January 2021 18	BB Erzurumspor	0–3	Fenerbahçe	Erzurum
16:00 TRT (UTC+3)	Osman Çelik (yellow card) 45'	Report	(yellow card) 45' Caner Erkin; 45' Mert Hakan Yandaş; 48' Dimitrios Pelkas; 51' Sinan Gümüş	Stadium: Kazım Karabekir Stadium; Attendance: 0 Referee: Mete Kalkavan

18 January 2021 19	Kasımpaşa	1–2	BB Erzurumspor	Istanbul
19:00 TRT (UTC+3)	Luckassen (yellow card) 58' (yellow-red card) 90+1'; Erdoğan (yellow card) 66'; Thelin 73'; Varga (yellow card) 84'; Hajradinović (yellow card) 90+5'	Report	Alkılıç 31'; Chahechouhe (yellow card) 64'; Gomes 68'; Boumal (yellow card) 71'; Szumski (yellow card) 86'; Karakullukçu (yellow card) 89'	Stadium: Recep Tayyip Erdoğan Stadium; Attendance: 0 Referee: Atilla Karaoğlan

21 January 2021 20	BB Erzurumspor	1–1	Alanyaspor	Erzurum
16:00 TRT (UTC+3)	Başsan 31'	Report	Bakasetas 58'; Tzavellas (red card) 90+1'	Stadium: Kazım Karabekir Stadium; Attendance: 0 Referee: Turgut Doman

21	Bye

31 January 2021 22	BB Erzurumspor	1–0	Ankaragücü	Erzurum
13:30 TRT (UTC+3)		Report		Stadium: Kazım Karabekir Stadium; Attendance: 0 Referee: Ümit Öztürk

3 February 2021 23	Sivasspor	0–0	BB Erzurumspor	Sivas
13:30 TRT (UTC+3)	Erdal (yellow card) 57'	Report	Uçar (yellow card) 65'	Stadium: 4 Eylül Stadium; Attendance: 0 Referee: Fırat Aydınus

7 February 2021 24	BB Erzurumspor	1–1	Kayserispor	Erzurum
13:30 TRT (UTC+3)	Chahechouhe 28' (pen.); Ackah (yellow card) 34' (yellow-red card) 34'	Report	Parlak 72'	Stadium: Kazım Karabekir Stadium; Attendance: 0 Referee: Yaşar Kemal Uğurlu

12 February 2021 25	Çaykur Rizespor	0–2	BB Erzurumspor	Rize
19:00 TRT (UTC+3)	Fernando (yellow card) 77' (yellow-red card) 83'	Report	Chahechouhe 67'; Oltan Karakullukçu 90+2'	Stadium: Yeni Rize Şehir Stadium; Attendance: 0 Referee: Cüneyt Çakır

21 February 2021 26	BB Erzurumspor	1–3	Hatayspor	Erzurum
13:30 TRT (UTC+3)		Report		Stadium: Kazım Karabekir Stadium; Attendance: 0 Referee: Serkan Tokat

27 February 2021 27	Galatasaray	2–0	BB Erzurumspor	Istanbul
19:00 TRT (UTC+3)	Mohamed 38', 45', (yellow card) 79'; Etebo (yellow card) 23'; Taylan (yellow card) 81'	Report	Teikeu (yellow card) 47'; Chahechouhe (yellow card) 63'; El Kabir (yellow card) 90'	Stadium: Türk Telekom Stadium; Attendance: 0 Referee: Mete Kalkavan

3 March 2021 28	BB Erzurumspor	2–2	Fatih Karagümrük	Erzurum
13:30 TRT (UTC+3)	Chahechouhe 17' (pen.); Çelik 63'	Report	Sobiech 30'; Castro 53'	Stadium: Kazım Karabekir Stadium; Attendance: 0 Referee: Ali Şansalan

8 March 2021 29	Göztepe	3–1	BB Erzurumspor	İzmir
18:00 TRT (UTC+3)		Report		Stadium: Gürsel Aksel Stadium; Attendance: 0 Referee: Zorbay Kücük

14 March 2021 30	BB Erzurumspor	0–0	Trabzonspor	Erzurum
16:00 TRT (UTC+3)	Boumal (yellow card) 62'; Bergdich (yellow card) 63'	Report		Stadium: Kazım Karabekir Stadium; Attendance: 0 Referee: Ali Palabıyık

21 March 2021 31	Antalyaspor	3–1	BB Erzurumspor	Antalya
13:30 TRT (UTC+3)	Özmert (yellow card) 40'; Fredy 54'; Bayrakdar 66'; Balcı 70'; Sarı (yellow card) 90+2'	Report	Butko (yellow card) 16'; Chahechouhe 39'; Bergdich (yellow card) 79'; Çelik (yellow card) 81'	Stadium: Antalya Stadium; Attendance: 0 Referee: Erkan Özdamar

4 April 2021 32	BB Erzurumspor	1–2	Konyaspor	Erzurum
13:30 TRT (UTC+3)		Report		Stadium: Kazım Karabekir Stadium; Attendance: 0 Referee: Sarper Baris Saka

7 April 2021 33	Gençlerbirliği	1–1	BB Erzurumspor	Ankara
16:00 TRT (UTC+3)		Report		Stadium: Eryaman Stadium; Attendance: 0 Referee: Suat Arslanboğa

11 April 2021 34	BB Erzurumspor	2–4	Beşiktaş	Erzurum
19:00 TRT (UTC+3)	Schwechlen 16'; Başsan 39'; Alkılıç (yellow card) 82'	Report	Larin 10'; Özyakup 26'; Toköz (yellow card) 57'; Ghezzal 66'; Töre 86'; Welinton (yellow card) 90+6'	Stadium: Kazım Karabekir Stadium; Attendance: 0 Referee: Yaşar Kemal Uğurlu

17 April 2021 35	Denizlispor	2–3	BB Erzurumspor	Denizli
13:30 TRT (UTC+3)		Report		Stadium: Atatürk Stadium; Attendance: 0 Referee: Halil Umut Meler

21 April 2021 36	BB Erzurumspor	1–0	Yeni Malatyaspor	Erzurum
16:00 TRT (UTC+3)		Report		Stadium: Kazım Karabekir Stadium; Attendance: 0 Referee: Ali Palabıyık

25 April 2021 37	Gaziantep	2–3	BB Erzurumspor	Gaziantep
16:00 TRT (UTC+3)		Report		Stadium: New Gaziantep Stadium; Attendance: 0 Referee: Halis Özkahya

29 April 2021 38	BB Erzurumspor	1–2	İstanbul Başakşehir	Erzurum
16:00 TRT (UTC+3)	Başsan 5', (yellow card) 81'; Alkılıç (yellow card) 37'	Report	Epureanu (red card) 18'; Chadli 58' (pen.); Türüç (yellow card) 81'; Gulbrandsen 84'; Babacan (yellow card) 87'; Crivelli (yellow card) 90+3'	Stadium: Kazım Karabekir Stadium; Attendance: 0 Referee: Fırat Aydınus

3 May 2021 39	Fenerbahçe	3–1	BB Erzurumspor	Istanbul
20:30 TRT (UTC+3)	Sosa 6' (pen.); Valencia 12'; Pelkas 14'	Report	Kardeş (yellow card) 5'; Rashani (yellow card) 50'; Uçar (yellow card) 79'; Sert 81'	Stadium: Şükrü Saracoğlu Stadium; Attendance: 0 Referee: Mete Kalkavan

8 May 2021 40	BB Erzurumspor	v	Kasımpaşa	Erzurum
20:30 TRT (UTC+3)				Stadium: Kazım Karabekir Stadium

42	Bye

=== Turkish Cup ===
3 November 2020 Third round	BB Erzurumspor	6–2	Karaköprü Belediyespor	Erzurum
18:00 TRT (UTC+3)	Muhammed 8'; Albayrak 34'; Hamroun 43'; Mina 45+1'; Obertan 47', 55'	Report	Duman (yellow card) 6'; Okur 51', 73'	Stadium: Kazım Karabekir Stadium; Attendance: 0 Referee: Abdullah Buğra Taşkınsoy
Note: Played Behind Closed Doors

26 November 2020 Fourth round	BB Erzurumspor	3–2 (a.e.t.)	Ankara Demirspor	Erzurum
13:00 TRT (UTC+3)	Hamroun 22' (pen.) 105+1' (pen.); Alkılıç (yellow card) 28'; Teikeu (yellow card) 31' (goal) 89'	Report	Güneş 44'; Devret (yellow card) 71'; Eylik 80'; Yilmaz (yellow card) 96'; Vapurluoğlu (yellow card) 105'	Stadium: Kazım Karabekir Stadium; Attendance: 0 Referee: Bülent Birincioğlu
Note: Played Behind Closed Doors

16 December 2020 Fifth round	BB Erzurumspor	5–1	Esenler Erokspor	Erzurum
13:00 TRT (UTC+3)	Başsan 7', 20'; Schwechlen (yellow card) 27'; Hamroun 29'; Çelik 66'; Şişmanoğlu 76'; Kardeş (yellow card) 89'	Report	Kalkan (yellow card) 11'; Sarikaya 24'	Stadium: Kazım Karabekir Stadium; Attendance: 0 Referee: Kutluhan Bilgiç
Note: Played Behind Closed Doors

14 January 2021 Round of 16	Alanyaspor	4–1	BB Erzurumspor	Antalya
18:45 TRT (UTC+3)	Babacar 14'; Caulker 24'; Babacar 57'; Davidson 77'	Report	Karakullukçu 7'	Stadium: New Antalya Stadium; Attendance: 0 Referee: Ramazan Keles
