= 2014–15 FC Amkar Perm season =

Amkar Perm
2014–15 season
- Chairman: Gennady Shilov
- Manager: Slavoljub Muslin (17 June – 9 December 2014); Gadzhi Gadzhiyev (30 December 2014 – )
- Stadium: Zvezda Stadium
- Russian Premier League: 11th
- Russian Cup: Round of 32 vs Tosno
- Top goalscorer: League: Georgi Peev (4); All: Georgi Peev (4)
- Highest home attendance: 12,800 vs Zenit St.Petersburg; 23 May 2015
- Lowest home attendance: 3,000 vs Ufa; 8 August 2014
- Average home league attendance: 7,492; 30 May 2015
Home colours	Away colours

The 2014–15 Amkar Perm season was their 11th season in the Russian Premier League, the highest tier of association football in Russia, following promotion during the 2003 season. They will participate in the Russian Premier League and Russian Cup.

Slavoljub Muslin was appointed as the club's manager on 17 June 2014, take over from Konstantin Paramonov who was the club's caretaker manager following Stanislav Cherchesov leaving the club in April of the previous season. Muslin was fired as manager on 9 December 2014, with Gadzhi Gadzhiyev being appointed as his replacement on 30 December.

== Squad ==
Note: Flags indicate national team as defined under FIFA eligibility rules; some limited exceptions apply. Players may hold more than one non-FIFA nationality.

No.	Pos.	Nation	Player
1	GK	RUS	Roman Gerus
3	DF	BUL	Petar Zanev
4	DF	RUS	Maksim Batov
5	MF	POL	Janusz Gol
6	DF	RUS	Aleksei Nikitin
7	MF	BUL	Georgi Peev (vice-captain)
8	MF	RUS	Igor Kireyev (on loan from FC Rostov)
9	FW	RUS	Aleksandr Prudnikov
10	FW	MDA	Igor Picusceac
13	MF	BLR	Syarhey Balanovich
14	DF	BUL	Zahari Sirakov
15	GK	RUS	Dmitri Khomich
16	DF	RUS	Brian Idowu
17	MF	RUS	David Dzakhov
18	FW	RUS	Aleksei Kurzenyov

No.	Pos.	Nation	Player
19	MF	RUS	Aleksandr Kolomeytsev
21	DF	RUS	Dmitri Belorukov (captain)
22	MF	RUS	Alikhan Shavayev
23	DF	RUS	Ivan Cherenchikov
26	FW	SVK	Martin Jakubko
30	DF	RUS	Soslan Takazov
33	MF	SRB	Branko Jovičić
43	FW	RUS	Yevgeni Tyukalov
50	DF	ARM	Robert Arzumanyan
87	MF	NGR	Fegor Ogude
88	MF	RUS	Pavel Solomatin (on loan from FC Dynamo Moscow)
89	FW	BLR	Kirill Sidorenko
91	DF	UKR	Bohdan Butko (loan from Shakhtar Donetsk)

== Transfers ==
=== Summer ===
In: Note: Flags indicate national team as defined under FIFA eligibility rules; some limited exceptions apply. Players may hold more than one non-FIFA nationality.

No.	Pos.	Nation	Player
8	MF	RUS	Igor Kireyev (on loan from (Russia) Rostov)
11	FW	MKD	Marko Simonovski (from (North Macedonia) Metalurg Skopje)
13	MF	BLR	Syarhey Balanovich (from (Belarus) Shakhtyor Soligorsk)
15	MF	LAT	Vladimirs Kamešs (end of loan to (Russia) Neftekhimik Nizhnekamsk)
16	DF	RUS	Brian Idowu (end of loan to (Russia) Dynamo St. Petersburg)
17	MF	RUS	David Dzakhov (from (Russia) Neftekhimik Nizhnekamsk)
22	MF	RUS	Alikhan Shavayev (from (Russia) Spartak Nalchik)
27	FW	RUS	Vladislav Shpitalny (from (Russia) Rubin Kazan)
29	DF	RUS	Rinat Guseynov
33	MF	SRB	Branko Jovičić (from (Serbia) Borac Čačak)
73	MF	RUS	Dmitri Opachev
88	FW	RUS	Pavel Solomatin (on loan from (Russia) Dynamo Moscow)
92	MF	RUS	Valeri Kuznetsov
—	GK	RUS	Aleksandr Selikhov (from (Russia) Oryol, previously on loan)

Out: Note: Flags indicate national team as defined under FIFA eligibility rules; some limited exceptions apply. Players may hold more than one non-FIFA nationality.

No.	Pos.	Nation	Player
4	DF	RUS	Dzhamaldin Khodzhaniyazov (end of loan from (Russia) Zenit St. Petersburg)
9	MF	BUL	Blagoy Georgiev (to (Russia) Rubin Kazan)
10	MF	RUS	Aleksei Rebko (to (Russia) Rostov)
17	MF	EST	Konstantin Vassiljev (to (Poland) Piast Gliwice)
20	MF	RUS	Dmitri Kayumov (end of loan from (Russia) Spartak Moscow)
27	GK	RUS	Stanislav Cherchesov Jr. (to (Russia) Dynamo Moscow)
32	MF	NED	Gianluca Nijholt (released)
45	DF	RUS	Andrei Pridyuk (on loan to (Russia) Tambov)
50	DF	RUS	Mikhail Smirnov (to (Russia) Tosno)
68	GK	RUS	Ivan Konovalov (to (Russia) SKChF Sevastopol)
70	MF	GHA	Patrick Twumasi (end of loan from (Latvia) Spartaks Jūrmala)
85	MF	SVK	Michal Breznaník (to (Czech Republic) Sparta Prague)
93	MF	RUS	Ivan Solovyov (end of loan from (Russia) Zenit St. Petersburg)
99	FW	RUS	Maksim Kanunnikov (to (Russia) Rubin Kazan)
—	MF	RUS	Aleksandr Pantsyrev (on loan to (Russia) Neftekhimik Nizhnekamsk, previously on loan to (Russia) Oktan Perm)
—	MF	RUS	Artur Ryabokobylenko (to (Russia) Tosno, previously on loan to (Russia) Spartak Nalchik)

=== Winter ===
In: Note: Flags indicate national team as defined under FIFA eligibility rules; some limited exceptions apply. Players may hold more than one non-FIFA nationality.

No.	Pos.	Nation	Player
4	DF	RUS	Maksim Batov (from (Russia) Zenit St. Petersburg)
9	FW	RUS	Aleksandr Prudnikov (from (Russia) Dynamo Moscow)
15	GK	RUS	Dmitri Khomich (from (Kazakhstan) Kairat)
50	DF	ARM	Robert Arzumanyan (from (Kazakhstan) Aktobe)
53	DF	RUS	Aleksandr Mosunov
71	GK	RUS	Anatoli Krasilnikov
72	FW	RUS	Ivan Ivanchenko
89	FW	BLR	Kirill Sidorenko (end of loan to (Belarus) Vitebsk)
91	DF	UKR	Bohdan Butko (loan from (Ukraine) Shakhtar Donetsk)
—	DF	CMR	Benoît Angbwa (Trial)

Out: Note: Flags indicate national team as defined under FIFA eligibility rules; some limited exceptions apply. Players may hold more than one non-FIFA nationality.

No.	Pos.	Nation	Player
15	FW	LAT	Vladimirs Kamešs (to (Poland) Pogoń Szczecin)
25	DF	POL	Damian Zbozień (to (Poland) GKS Bełchatów)
31	DF	POL	Jakub Wawrzyniak (to (Poland) Lechia Gdańsk)
42	GK	RUS	Sergei Narubin (to (Russia) Tosno)
47	DF	RUS	Roman Urkhov (to (Russia) Region 69 Tver Oblast)
97	DF	FRA	Thomas Phibel (released)
99	FW	RUS	Aleksandr Subbotin (to (Russia) Baltika Kaliningrad)

== Friendlies ==
18 January 2015	Atyrau (Kazakhstan)	1 – 3	(Russia) Amkar Perm	Belek, Turkey
YET (UTC+6)	Essame 7'	Summary	Balanovich 35'; Angbwa 71'; Prudnikov 81'	Stadium: Golf Hotel Bellis Deluxe

22 January 2015	Ordabasy (Kazakhstan)	0 – 5	(Russia) Amkar Perm	Belek, Turkey
YET (UTC+6)		Summary	Jakubko 4'; Angbwa 14'; Zbozień 20'; Sirakov 62'; Peev 84'	Stadium: Golf Hotel Bellis Deluxe

27 January 2015	Tosno	0 – 1	Amkar Perm	Belek, Turkey
YET (UTC+6)		Summary	Ogude 1'	Stadium: Golf Hotel Bellis Deluxe

30 January 2015	Vardar (North Macedonia)	3 – 0	(Russia) Amkar Perm	Belek, Turkey
YET (UTC+6)	Ivanovski 13'; Blaževski 49'; Petrov 86'	Summary		Stadium: Golf Hotel Bellis Deluxe

2 February 2015	Dinamo Batumi (Georgia (country))	2 – 2	(Russia) Amkar Perm	Belek, Turkey
YET (UTC+6)	Mgeladze 38'; Tetunashvili 55'	Summary	Jakubko 43'; Prudnikov 81'	Stadium: Golf Hotel Bellis Deluxe

8 February 2015	Sioni Bolnisi (Georgia (country))	0 – 0	(Russia) Amkar Perm	Belek, Turkey
YET (UTC+6)		Summary		Stadium: Golf Hotel Bellis Deluxe

8 February 2015	Sparta Prague (Czech Republic)	0 – 0	(Russia) Amkar Perm	Belek, Turkey
YET (UTC+6)		Summary		Stadium: Golf Hotel Bellis Deluxe

12 February 2015	Ružomberok (Slovakia)	0 – 2	(Russia) Amkar Perm	Belek, Turkey
20:00 YET (UTC+6)		Summary	Peev 44' (pen.); Jakubko 61'	Stadium: Golf Hotel Bellis Deluxe

== Competitions ==
=== Russian Premier League ===
==== Results by round ====
Round	1	2	3	4	5	6	7	8	9	10	11	12	13	14	15	16	17	18	19	20	21	22	23	24	25	26	27	28	29	30
Ground	A	H	A	A	A	H	H	H	A	H	A	H	A	A	A	A	H	A	A	H	A	H	H	H	H	H	A	H	H	A
Result	L	L	D	L	L	W	W	L	L	W	D	L	L	D	L	L	D	D	L	L	L	W	L	W	W	D	D	W	W	D
Position	15	14	12	14	15	12	12	12	12	12	12	12	12	13	14	14	14	15	15	16	16	16	16	15	15	13	13	11	11	11

Updated to match(es) played on 30 May 2015. Source: Russian Premier League
A = Away; H = Home; W = Win; D = Draw; L = Loss

==== Matches ====
4 August 2014 1	Terek Grozny	4 – 0	Amkar Perm'	Grozny
22:00 YET (UTC+6)	Rybus 64', 88'; Adílson (yellow card) 72'; Lebedenko 76'; Maurício 80'	Summary	Zanev (yellow card) 58'; Peev (yellow card) 67'	Stadium: Akhmat-Arena; Attendance: 15,000; Referee: Aleksey Eskov

8 August 2014 2	Amkar Perm'	0 – 1	Ufa	Perm
20:00 YET (UTC+6)	Cherenchikov (yellow card) 50'	Summary	Tishkin (yellow card) 39'; Marcinho 53' (pen.) (yellow card) 87'	Stadium: Zvezda Stadium; Attendance: 3,000; Referee: Sergey Kulikov

12 August 2014 3	Torpedo Moscow	1 – 1	Amkar Perm'	Ramensky District
22:00 YET (UTC+6)	Rykov 43' (yellow card) 80'; Salugin (yellow card) 60'; Aydov (yellow card) 82'	Summary	Sirakov (yellow card) 33'; Picusceac 62'; Kireyev (yellow card) 77'; Phibel (yellow card) 90'	Stadium: Saturn Stadium; Attendance: 3,000; Referee: Vitali Meshkov

18 August 2014 4	Kuban Krasnodar	1 – 0	Amkar Perm'	Krasnodar
23:00 YET (UTC+6)	Sosnin (yellow card) 61'; Kaboré (yellow card) 66'; Popov (yellow card) 78'; Bucur (yellow card) 90' (goal) 90+2'	Summary	Belorukov (yellow card) 17'; Kireyev (yellow card) 41'; Ogude (red card) 64'	Stadium: Kuban Stadium; Attendance: 7,112; Referee: Sergei Ivanov

23 August 2014 5	Zenit St. Petersburg	2 – 0	Amkar Perm'	Saint Petersburg
19:00 YET (UTC+6)	Shatov 13'; Hulk 22'	Report	Dzakhov (yellow card) 39'; Nikitin (yellow card) 82'	Stadium: Petrovsky Stadium; Attendance: 13,063; Referee: Alexey Nikolaev

30 August 2014 6	Amkar Perm'	2 – 0	Spartak Moscow	Perm
19:00 YET (UTC+6)	Kireyev 45+3'; Belorukov (yellow card) 53'; Gerus (yellow card) 68'; Peev 83'	Summary	Makeyev (yellow card) 28'; Parshivlyuk (yellow card) 58'; Glushakov (yellow card) 85'	Stadium: Zvezda Stadium; Attendance: 12,600; Referee: Mikhail Vilkov

15 September 2014 7	Amkar Perm'	2 – 1	Ural	Perm
19:00 YEKT (UTC+6)	Dzakhov 5'; Peev 32'; Phibel (yellow card) 44'	Summary	Smolov 12'; Yerokhin (yellow card) 16'; Acevedo (yellow card) 44'; Fidler (yellow card) 50'	Stadium: Zvezda Stadium; Attendance: 3,500; Referee: Sergey Lapochkin

22 September 2014 8	Amkar Perm'	1 – 2	Krasnodar	Perm
19:00 YET (UTC+6)	Dzakhov (yellow card) 34'; Balanovich (yellow card) 38'; Kireyev 44'; Cherenchikov (yellow card) 73'	Summary	Wánderson 26'; Kaleshin (yellow card) 27'; Joãozinho 74' (pen.); Jędrzejczyk (yellow card) 90+2'; Dykan (yellow card) 90+2'	Stadium: Zvezda Stadium; Attendance: 8,500; Referee: Aleksei Matyunin

28 September 2014 9	Lokomotiv Moscow	3 – 1	Amkar Perm'	Moscow
18:00 YET (UTC+6)	Boussoufa (yellow card) 18'; Ćorluka 66', 77'; O.Niasse 67'	Summary	Jovičić 74'	Stadium: Lokomotiv Stadium; Attendance: 8,851; Referee: Vladislav Bezborodov

18 October 2014 10	Amkar Perm'	Postponed	Dynamo Moscow	Perm
14:00 YET (UTC+6)		Summary		Stadium: Zvezda Stadium; Referee: Sergey Lapochkin

25 October 2014 11	Amkar Perm'	2 – 0	Rostov	Perm
16:00 YET (UTC+6)	Ogude 16'; Dzakhov (yellow card) 36'; Kolomeytsev 84'	Summary	Gațcan (yellow card) 42'; Bukharov (yellow card) 65'	Stadium: Zvezda Stadium; Attendance: 5,200; Referee: Kirill Levnikov

3 November 2014 12	Rubin Kazan'	1 – 1	Amkar Perm'	Kazan
18:30 YET (UTC+5)	Kambolov (yellow card) 77'; Karadeniz 90' (yellow card) 90'	Summary	Cherenchikov (yellow card) 12'; Jovičić (yellow card) 32' (goal) 90+3'; Ogude (yellow card) 45'; Zanev (yellow card) 72'; Gerus (yellow card) 80'	Stadium: Kazan Arena; Attendance: 12,701; Referee: Aleksey Eskov

8 November 2014 13	Amkar Perm'	0 – 1	Mordovia Saransk	Perm
15:00 YET (UTC+5)	Ogude (yellow card) 39'; Balanovich (yellow card) 83'	Summary	Vlasov (yellow card) 37'; Vasin 54'	Stadium: Zvezda Stadium; Attendance: 4,000; Referee: Sergei Ivanov

23 November 2014 14	Arsenal Tula	4 – 0	Amkar Perm'	Tula
18:00 YET (UTC+5)	Kuznetsov 8', 67'; Osipov 52'; Kutyin 56'	Summary	Ogude (yellow card) 20'; Gol (yellow card) 54'	Stadium: Arsenal Stadium; Attendance: 7,800; Referee: Aleksandr Egorov

28 November 2014 15	Rostov	0 – 0	Amkar Perm'	Rostov-on-Don
21:00 YET (UTC+5)	Bukharov 41' (pen.)	Summary	Gol (yellow card) 8' (goal) 11'; Cherenchikov (yellow card) 20' (yellow-red card) 87'; Balanovich (yellow card) 56'; Gerus (yellow card) 90+1'	Stadium: Olimp-2; Attendance: 3,505; Referee: Vladmir Moskalev

2 December 2014 16	CSKA Moscow	2 – 1	Amkar Perm'	Khimki
21:00 YET (UTC+5)	Eremenko 78', 90+1'	Summary	Takazov 15'; Ogude (yellow card) 59'; Tyukalov (yellow card) 78'; Nikitin (yellow card) 79'; Zanev (yellow card) 84'	Stadium: Arena Khimki; Attendance: 6,200; Referee: Sergei Ivanov

7 December 2014 17	Dynamo Moscow	5 – 0	Amkar Perm'	Khimki
18:00 YET (UTC+5)	Kurányi 22'; Valbuena 48'; Dzsudzsák 67'; Hubočan (yellow card) 76'; Ionov 81'; Yusupov 88'	Summary	Cherenchikov (yellow card) 86'	Stadium: Arena Khimki; Attendance: 4,105; Referee: Sergey Lapochkin

9 March 2015 18	Amkar Perm'	0 – 0	Torpedo Moscow	Perm
15:00 YET (UTC+5)	Prudnikov (yellow card) 41'; Arzumanyan (yellow card) 80'; Butko (yellow card) 90+2'	Summary	Bilyaletdinov (yellow card) 70'; Katsalapov (yellow card) 89'; Rykov (yellow card) 90+3'	Stadium: Zvezda Stadium; Attendance: 8,400; Referee: Sergey Kulikov

14 March 2015 19	Ufa	1 – 1	Amkar Perm'	Saransk
15:00 YET (UTC+5)	Frimpong (yellow card) 17'; Shevchenko 72'; Tishkin (yellow card) 90+2'	Summary	Ogude (yellow card) 19'; Prudnikov 85'	Stadium: Start Stadium (Saransk); Attendance: 1,162; Referee: Sergey Karasev

21 March 2015 20	Ural	1 – 0	Amkar Perm'	Yekaterinburg
14:00 YET (UTC+5)	Yemelyanov (yellow card) 27'; Yerokhin (yellow card) 66'; Acevedo 78' (yellow card) 79'	Summary	Jakubko (yellow card) 12'; Zanev (yellow card) 29'; Ogude (yellow card) 34'	Stadium: Ural Stadium; Attendance: 2,980; Referee: Aleksei Matyunin

4 April 2015 21	Amkar Perm'	0 – 3	Rubin Kazan'	Perm
14:00 YET (UTC+5)	Cherenchikov (yellow card) 58'; Jovičić (yellow card) 73'; Kolomeytsev (yellow card) 84'; Belorukov (yellow card) 90+1'	Summary	Kuzmin (yellow card) 22'; Portnyagin 45+1', 81'; Kvirkvelia (yellow card) 53'; Jovičić 65'; Navas (yellow card) 76'	Stadium: Zvezda Stadium; Attendance: 8,600; Referee: Sergey Lapochkin

7 April 2015 22	Mordovia Saransk	1 – 0	Amkar Perm'	Saransk
19:45 YET (UTC+5)	Djaló 3' (pen.)	Summary	Ogude (yellow card) 2'; Cherenchikov (yellow card) 66'; Belorukov (yellow card) 76' (yellow-red card) 83'	Stadium: Start Stadium; Attendance: 4,335; Referee: Vladimir Moskalyov

13 April 2015 23	Amkar Perm'	1 – 0	CSKA Moscow	Perm
19:15 YET (UTC+5)	Kireyev 59' (yellow card) 60'	Summary		Stadium: Zvezda Stadium; Attendance: 8,900; Referee: Aleksandr Egorov

20 April 2015 24	Amkar Perm'	0 – 1	Arsenal Tula	Perm
19:00 YET (UTC+5)		Summary	Osipov (yellow card) 78'; Kašćelan (yellow card) 84'; Smirnov 90'	Stadium: Zvezda Stadium; Attendance: 4,800; Referee: Kirill Levnikov

25 April 2015 25	Amkar Perm'	2 – 1	Terek Grozny	Perm
15:00 YET (UTC+5)	Prudnikov 20'; Jovičić 62'; Ogude (yellow card) 71'; Gol (yellow card) 79'	Summary	Kuzyayev (yellow card) 19'; Maurício 26'; Rodolfo (yellow card) 86'	Stadium: Zvezda Stadium; Attendance: 5,900; Referee: Sergey Kulikov

30 April 2015 10	Amkar Perm'	2 – 0	Dynamo Moscow	Perm
19:00 YET (UTC+5)	Peev 22' (pen.); Kolomeytsev 32'	Summary	Hubočan (yellow card) 22'; Katrich (yellow card) 89'	Stadium: Zvezda Stadium; Attendance: 7,700; Referee: Sergey Lapochkin

3 May 2015 26	Amkar Perm'	1 – 1	Lokomotiv Moscow	Perm
18:00 YET (UTC+5)	Prudnikov (yellow card) 38'; Arzumanyan (yellow card) 44'; Peev (yellow card) 60' (red card) 90+5' (goal) 67' (pen.); Ogude (yellow card) 74'	Summary	Niasse (yellow card) 21'; Tarasov (yellow card) 25'; Mykhalyk (yellow card) 60'; Logashov (yellow card) 70'; Samedov 90+4'	Stadium: Zvezda Stadium; Attendance: 11,180; Referee: Igor Nizovtsev

11 May 2015 27	Krasnodar	1 – 1	Amkar Perm'	Krasnodar
20:30 YET (UTC+5)	Pereyra 8'; Kaleshin (yellow card) 25'; Laborde (yellow card) 83'; Sigurðsson (yellow card) 90+5'	Summary	Gol 23'; Batov (yellow card) 88'	Stadium: Kuban Stadium; Attendance: 10,125; Referee: Vladislav Bezborodov

16 May 2015 28	Amkar Perm'	1 – 0	Kuban Krasnodar	Perm
16:00 YET (UTC+5)	Jovičić (yellow card) 2'; Prudnikov 27'; Cherenchikov (yellow card) 65'	Summary	Khubulov (yellow card) 31'; Kulik (yellow card) 73'; Almeida (red card) 77'	Stadium: Zvezda Stadium; Attendance: 7,300; Referee: Aleksei Matyunin

23 May 2015 29	Amkar Perm'	1 – 0	Zenit St.Petersburg	Perm
15:00 YET (UTC+5)	Kolomeytsev 38'	Summary	Shatov (yellow card) 70'; Hulk (yellow card) 90+1'	Stadium: Zvezda Stadium; Attendance: 12,800; Referee: Sergey Karasev

30 May 2015 30	Spartak Moscow	3 – 3	Amkar Perm'	Moscow
15:30 YET (UTC+5)	Promes 64', 90+1'; Krotov 72'	Summary	Prudnikov 16'; Cherenchikov (yellow card) 40'; Peev 44'; Butko 86'	Stadium: Otkrytie Arena; Attendance: 11,527; Referee: Sergei Ivanov

==== Table ====
Pos	Team	Pld	W	D	L	GF	GA	GD	Pts	Qualification or relegation
9	Terek Grozny	30	10	7	13	30	30	0	37	
10	Kuban Krasnodar	30	8	12	10	32	36	−4	36	
11	Amkar Perm	30	8	8	14	25	42	−17	32	
12	Ufa	30	7	10	13	26	39	−13	31	
13	Ural Sverdlovsk Oblast (O)	30	9	3	18	31	44	−13	30	Qualification for the Relegation play-offs

Source: Russian Premier League
Rules for classification: 1) points; 2) number of matches won; 3) head-to-head points; 4) head-to-head wins; 5) head-to-head goal difference; 6) head-to-head goals; 7) number of head-to-head away goals; 8) goal difference; 9) number of goals scored; 10) number of away goals scored
(O) Play-off winners

=== Russian Cup ===
25 September 2014 Round of 32	Tosno	0 – 0 (a.e.t.) (4 – 2 p)	Amkar Perm	Tikhvin
17:00 YET (UTC+6)	Ponomaryov (yellow card) 107'	Summary	Picusceac (yellow card) 98'	Stadium: Kirovets Stadium; Attendance: 2,000; Referee: Sergey Kostevich
	Penalties
	Pazin (penalty scored); Prychynenko (penalty scored); Zaytsev (penalty scored); Khadartsev (penalty scored)		Peev (penalty scored); Picusceac (penalty scored); Zanev (penalty missed); Balanovich (penalty missed)

== Squad statistics ==
As of Match played 30 May 2015

=== Appearances and goals ===
No.	Pos	Nat	Player	Total		Premier League		Russian Cup	
No.	Pos	Nat	Player	Apps	Goals	Apps	Goals	Apps	Goals
1	GK	(Russia) RUS	Roman Gerus	27	0	27	0	0	0
3	DF	(Bulgaria) BUL	Petar Zanev	25	0	23+1	0	1	0
4	DF	(Russia) RUS	Maksim Batov	10	0	3+7	0	0	0
5	MF	(Poland) POL	Janusz Gol	24	2	17+6	2	1	0
6	DF	(Russia) RUS	Aleksei Nikitin	10	0	9+1	0	0	0
7	MF	(Bulgaria) BUL	Georgi Peev	16	5	9+6	5	1	0
8	MF	(Russia) RUS	Igor Kireyev	18	3	14+4	3	0	0
9	FW	(Russia) RUS	Aleksandr Prudnikov	13	4	13	4	0	0
10	FW	(Moldova) MDA	Igor Picusceac	13	1	5+7	1	0+1	0
11	FW	(North Macedonia) MKD	Marko Simonovski	4	0	0+4	0	0	0
13	MF	(Belarus) BLR	Syarhey Balanovich	25	0	24	0	0+1	0
14	DF	(Bulgaria) BUL	Zahari Sirakov	10	0	8+2	0	0	0
15	GK	(Russia) RUS	Dmitri Khomich	1	0	1	0	0	0
16	DF	(Russia) RUS	Brian Idowu	11	0	1+9	0	1	0
17	MF	(Russia) RUS	David Dzakhov	15	1	13+2	1	0	0
18	FW	(Russia) RUS	Aleksei Kurzenyov	1	0	1	0	0	0
19	MF	(Russia) RUS	Aleksandr Kolomeytsev	30	3	27+2	3	1	0
21	DF	(Russia) RUS	Dmitri Belorukov	15	0	15	0	0	0
22	MF	(Russia) RUS	Alikhan Shavayev	5	0	2+3	0	0	0
23	DF	(Russia) RUS	Ivan Cherenchikov	26	0	22+3	0	1	0
26	FW	(Slovakia) SVK	Martin Jakubko	14	0	2+12	0	0	0
30	DF	(Russia) RUS	Soslan Takazov	11	1	9+1	1	1	0
33	MF	(Serbia) SRB	Branko Jovičić	22	3	16+5	3	0+1	0
43	FW	(Russia) RUS	Yevgeni Tyukalov	1	0	0+1	0	0	0
50	DF	(Armenia) ARM	Robert Arzumanyan	8	0	8	0	0	0
87	MF	(Nigeria) NGR	Fegor Ogude	25	1	24	1	1	0
88	MF	(Russia) RUS	Pavel Solomatin	8	0	4+3	0	1	0
91	DF	(Ukraine) UKR	Bohdan Butko	12	1	11+1	1	0	0
99	FW	(Russia) RUS	Aleksandr Subbotin	1	0	0+1	0	0	0
Players who left Amkar Perm on loan:
Players who left Amkar Perm during the season:
9	MF	(Bulgaria) BUL	Blagoy Georgiev	3	0	3	0	0	0
25	DF	(Poland) POL	Damian Zbozień	2	0	2	0	0	0
31	DF	(Poland) POL	Jakub Wawrzyniak	6	0	4+2	0	0	0
42	GK	(Russia) RUS	Sergei Narubin	3	0	2	0	1	0
97	DF	(France) FRA	Thomas Phibel	12	0	11	0	1	0

=== Goal Scorers ===
Place	Position	Nation	Number	Name	Premier League	Russian Cup	Total
1	MF	(Bulgaria)	7	Georgi Peev	5	0	5
2	FW	(Russia)	9	Aleksandr Prudnikov	4	0	4
3	MF	(Russia)	8	Igor Kireyev	3	0	3
3	MF	(Serbia)	33	Branko Jovičić	3	0	3
3	MF	(Russia)	19	Aleksandr Kolomeytsev	3	0	3
6	MF	(Poland)	5	Janusz Gol	2	0	2
7	FW	(Moldova)	10	Igor Picusceac	1	0	1
7	MF	(Russia)	17	David Dzakhov	1	0	1
7	MF	(Nigeria)	87	Fegor Ogude	1	0	1
7	DF	(Russia)	30	Soslan Takazov	1	0	1
7	DF	(Ukraine)	91	Bohdan Butko	1	0	1
				TOTALS	25	0	25

=== Disciplinary record ===
Number	Nation	Position	Name	Russian Premier League		Russian Cup		Total	
Number	Nation	Position	Name	Yellow card	Red card	Yellow card	Red card	Yellow card	Red card
1	(Russia)	GK	Roman Gerus	3	0	0	0	3	0
3	(Bulgaria)	DF	Petar Zanev	4	0	0	0	4	0
4	(Russia)	DF	Maksim Batov	1	0	0	0	1	0
5	(Poland)	MF	Janusz Gol	3	0	0	0	3	0
6	(Russia)	MF	Aleksei Nikitin	1	0	0	0	1	0
7	(Bulgaria)	MF	Georgi Peev	2	1	0	0	2	1
8	(Russia)	MF	Igor Kireyev	3	0	0	0	3	0
9	(Russia)	FW	Aleksandr Prudnikov	2	0	0	0	2	0
10	(Moldova)	FW	Igor Picusceac	0	0	1	0	1	0
13	(Belarus)	MF	Syarhey Balanovich	3	0	0	0	3	0
14	(Bulgaria)	DF	Zahari Sirakov	1	0	0	0	1	0
17	(Russia)	MF	David Dzakhov	1	0	0	0	1	0
19	(Russia)	MF	Aleksandr Kolomeytsev	1	0	0	0	1	0
21	(Russia)	DF	Dmitri Belorukov	6	1	0	0	6	1
23	(Russia)	DF	Ivan Cherenchikov	10	1	0	0	10	1
26	(Slovakia)	FW	Martin Jakubko	1	0	0	0	1	0
33	(Serbia)	MF	Branko Jovičić	3	0	0	0	3	0
43	(Russia)	FW	Yevgeni Tyukalov	1	0	0	0	1	0
50	(Armenia)	DF	Robert Arzumanyan	2	0	0	0	2	0
87	(Nigeria)	MF	Fegor Ogude	9	1	0	0	9	1
91	(Ukraine)	DF	Bohdan Butko	1	0	0	0	1	0
97	(France)	DF	Thomas Phibel	2	0	0	0	2	0
			TOTALS	60	4	1	0	61	4

== Notes ==
- YEKT time changed from UTC+6 to UTC+5 permanently on 26 October 2014.
