= Bohdan Butko =

Ukrainian footballer

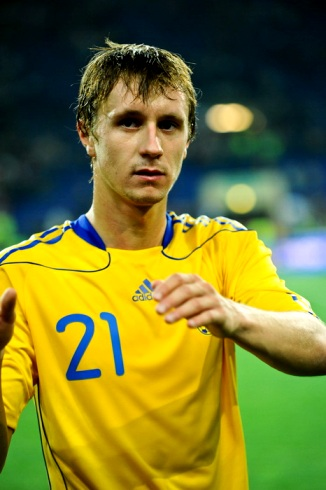
- Butko with Ukraine in 2011

Personal information
- Full name: Bohdan Yevhenovych Butko
- Date of birth: 13 January 1991 (age 35)
- Place of birth: Kostiantynivka, Ukrainian SSR
- Height: 1.80 m (5 ft 11 in)
- Position: Right-back

Youth career
- 2004–2008: Shakhtar Donetsk

Senior career*
Years	Team	Apps	(Gls)
2008–2021	Shakhtar Donetsk	45	(1)
2008	→ Shakhtar-3 Donetsk	6	(1)
2010–2011	→ Volyn Lutsk (loan)	27	(3)
2011–2014	→ Illichivets Mariupol (loan)	89	(2)
2015–2016	→ Amkar Perm (loan)	38	(1)
2020	→ Lech Poznań (loan)	10	(0)
2020	→ Lech Poznań (loan)	3	(0)
2021	→ BB Erzurumspor (loan)	10	(0)
2022–2024	Zorya Luhansk	39	(2)
2024–2025	Chornomorets Odesa	25	(1)
2026	Oleksandriya	11	(0)

International career^{‡}
2006–2007	Ukraine U16	15	(0)
2007–2009	Ukraine U17	7	(0)
2009	Ukraine U18	9	(1)
2009–2010	Ukraine U19	10	(0)
2010–2011	Ukraine U21	13	(1)
2011–2019	Ukraine	33	(0)
Medal record
Men's football
Representing Ukraine
UEFA European Under-19 Championship
Winner	2009 Ukraine
- * Club domestic league appearances and goals as of 29 August 2026 ‡ National team caps and goals as of 30 June 2021

Bohdan Yevhenovych Butko (Ukrainian: Богда́н Євге́нович Бутко́, born 13 January 1991) is a Ukrainian footballer who plays as a defender.

== Club career ==
=== Early life and career ===
Butko was born in Kostiantynivka, in the Donetsk Oblast and went to the youth academy of his local club Shakhtar Donetsk. Upon completion of the school, Butko was promoted first to Shakhtar-3 Donetsk of the Ukrainian Second League, followed by the Shakhtar reserves, where he would spend three seasons.

=== Professional career ===
He went on loan to Volyn Lutsk in Ukrainian Premier League on 16 July 2010. He would go on to play 27 league games and score three goals for them in the 2010–11 season.

In the 2011–12 season, he went on loan to FC Illichivets Mariupol of the Ukrainian Premier League.

On 1 July 2024, Butko joined Ukrainian Premier League side Chornomorets Odesa. On 3 August 2024 in the 1st round match of Ukrainian Premier League 2024–25 between Kryvbas Kryvyi Rih and Chornomorets he made his official debut as player of Chornomorets.

On 22 January 2026, Butko joined Ukrainian Premier League side FC Oleksandriya. On 28 February 2026 in the 18th round match of Ukrainian Premier League 2025–26 between Metalist 1925 and Oleksandriya he made his official debut as player of Oleksandriya.

== Personal life ==
In October 2021, Butko published homophobic remarks in his Instagram account directed at Josh Cavallo and his supporters.

== Career statistics ==
=== Club ===
As of 18 March 2023

Appearances and goals by club, season and competition
Club	Season	League			National cup (Note: Includes Ukrainian Cup, Russian Cup, Polish Cup)		Continental		Other		Total	
Club	Season	Division	Apps	Goals	Apps	Goals	Apps	Goals	Apps	Goals	Apps	Goals
Shakhtar-3 Donetsk	2007–08	Ukrainian Second League	6	1	0	0	0	0	0	0	6	1
Shakhtar Donetsk	2008–09	Ukrainian Premier League	0	0	0	0	0	0	0	0	0	0
Shakhtar Donetsk	2009–10	Ukrainian Premier League	0	0	0	0	0	0	0	0	0	0
Shakhtar Donetsk	2016–17	Ukrainian Premier League	11	1	2	0	3 (Note: Appearances in UEFA Europa League)	0	0	0	16	1
Shakhtar Donetsk	2017–18	Ukrainian Premier League	20	0	2	0	7 (Note: Appearances in UEFA Champions League)	0	0	0	29	0
Shakhtar Donetsk	2018–19	Ukrainian Premier League	14	0	0	0	5 (Note: Three appearances in UEFA Champions League, two appearances in UEFA Europa League)	0	0	0	19	0
Shakhtar Donetsk	Total		45	1	4	0	15	0	0	0	64	1
Volyn Lutsk (loan)	2010–11	Ukrainian Premier League	27	3	1	0	0	0	0	0	28	3
Illichivets Mariupol (loan)	2011–12	Ukrainian Premier League	27	1	1	0	0	0	0	0	28	1
Illichivets Mariupol (loan)	2012–13	Ukrainian Premier League	29	1	2	0	0	0	0	0	31	1
Illichivets Mariupol (loan)	2013–14	Ukrainian Premier League	25	0	1	0	0	0	0	0	26	0
Illichivets Mariupol (loan)	2014–15	Ukrainian Premier League	8	0	1	0	0	0	0	0	9	0
Illichivets Mariupol (loan)	Total		89	2	5	0	0	0	0	0	94	2
Amkar Perm (loan)	2014–15	Russian Premier League	12	1	0	0	0	0	0	0	12	1
Amkar Perm (loan)	2015–16	Russian Premier League	26	0	3	0	0	0	0	0	29	0
Amkar Perm (loan)	Total		38	1	3	0	0	0	0	0	41	1
Lech Poznań (loan)	2019–20	Ekstraklasa	10	0	2	0	—		—		12	0
Lech Poznań (loan)	2020–21	Ekstraklasa	3	0	0	0	3	0	—		6	0
Lech Poznań (loan)	Total		13	0	2	0	3	0	—		18	0
BB Erzurumspor (loan)	2020–21	Süper Lig	10	0	—		—		—		10	0
Zorya Luhansk	2022–23	Ukrainian Premier League	13	2	0	0	—		—		13	2
Career total			241	10	15	0	18	0	0	0	274	10

=== International ===
Appearances and goals by national team and year
National team	Year	Apps	Goals
Ukraine
Ukraine	2011	6	0
Ukraine	2012	9	0
Ukraine	2016	8	0
Ukraine	2017	6	0
Ukraine	2018	3	0
Ukraine	2019	1	0
Total		33	0

== Honours ==
Shakhtar

- Ukrainian Premier League: 2016–17, 2017–18, 2018–19
- Ukrainian Cup: 2016–17, 2017–18, 2018–19
- Ukrainian Super Cup: 2017

Ukraine U19

- UEFA European Under-19 Championship: 2009
