= Mitchell Donald =

Surinamese footballer

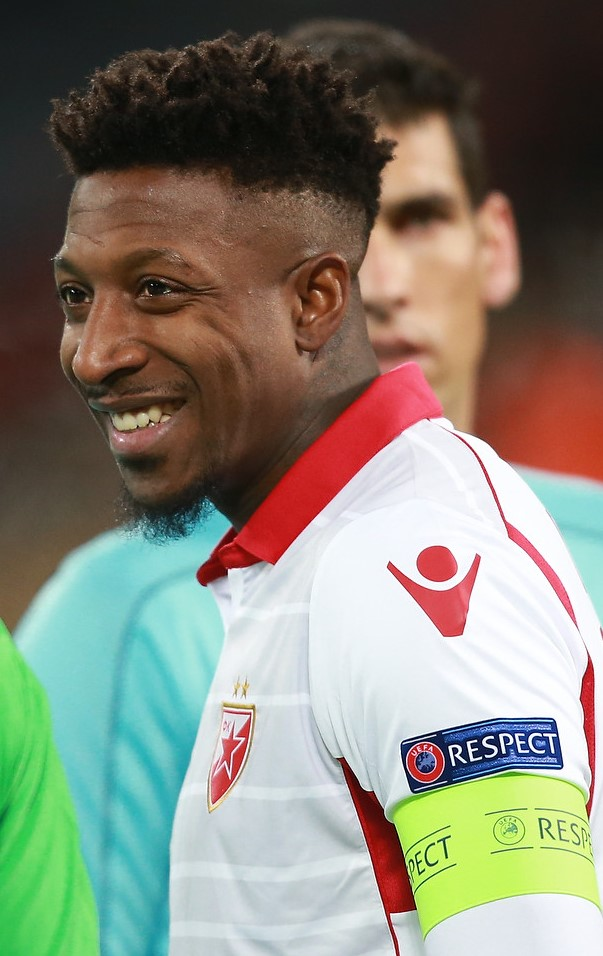
- Donald with Red Star Belgrade in 2018

Personal information
- Full name: Mitchell Glenn Donald
- Date of birth: 10 December 1988 (age 37)
- Place of birth: Nieuw-Vennep, Netherlands
- Height: 1.85 m (6 ft 1 in)
- Position: Defensive midfielder

Youth career
- SV Bijlmer
- –1998: Zeeburgia
- 1998–2007: Ajax

Senior career*
Years	Team	Apps	(Gls)
2007–2011	Ajax	8	(1)
2007–2009	→ Jong Ajax (loan)	56	(8)
2010	→ Willem II (loan)	14	(1)
2011–2014	Roda JC	91	(12)
2014–2015	Mordovia	14	(3)
2015–2018	Red Star Belgrade	79	(12)
2018–2020	Yeni Malatyaspor	58	(10)
2020–2021	BB Erzurumspor	16	(1)
Total		336	(48)

International career
2009	Netherlands U21	3	(0)
2021	Suriname	2	(0)
- * Club domestic league appearances and goals

Mitchell Glenn Donald (born 10 December 1988) is a former professional footballer who played as a defensive midfielder. He previously played for AFC Ajax, where he went through the youth program. Born in the Netherlands, he played for the Suriname national team.

== Club career ==
=== Ajax ===
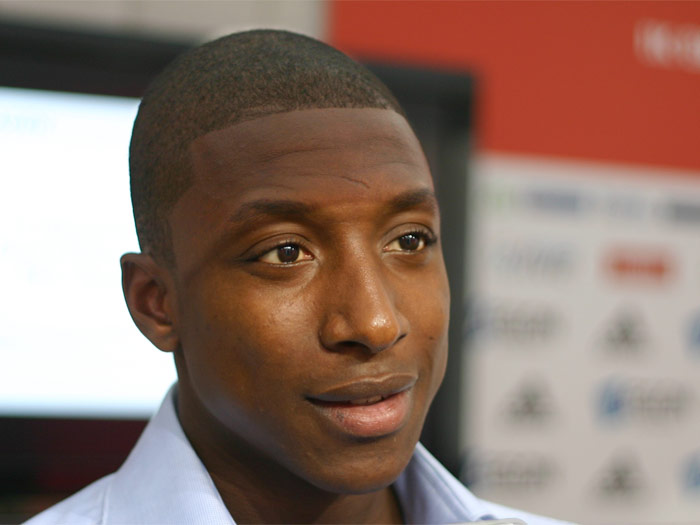
Donald with Ajax in 2009

Born in Nieuw-Vennep, Donald joined Ajax following spells at amateur sides SV Bijlmer and A.V.V. Zeeburgia. He joined the first team of Ajax after the 2006–07 winter break in February 2007. Donald made his professional Ajax debut under manager Henk ten Cate on 14 February 2007, in the UEFA Cup clash against SV Werder Bremen. In August 2007 he participated in the 1–0 win over PSV Eindhoven to clinch the Johan Cruijff-schaal, his first trophy. Donald made his Eredivisie debut on 23 September 2007 in a match against AZ, coming on as a substitute for Klaas-Jan Huntelaar. He went on to make two more substitutes appearances in the 2007–08 season, on 25 November 2007 against Vitesse Arnhem and on 13 January 2008 against AZ.

Donald made no appearances in the Eredivisie in the 2008–09 season under manager Marco van Basten, after being badly injured in pre-season at the Amsterdam Tournament in a challenge on Inter's Adriano, but he reestablished himself in the squad following the appointment of Martin Jol. On 27 July 2009, almost exactly a year after injuring himself there, Donald appeared once again at the Amsterdam Tournament in a match against S.L. Benfica. Jol stated that the game of Donald was "surprising" and that his game was "very good and beautiful for such a young player. It also gives confidence and that is important". On 20 August 2009, he came on as a substitute in the UEFA Europa League match against Slovan Bratislava, and was in the starting line-up the following week in the away return match. On 20 September 2009, Donald played his first Eredivisie match in 20 months, coming on as a substitute in an away match against VVV-Venlo. On 11 December 2009 (one day after his 21st birthday), Donald scored his first Eredivisie goal for Ajax in a 3–0 victory over N.E.C.

==== Loan spell at Willem II ====
On 29 January 2010, Willem II signed the midfielder on loan from AFC Ajax until June 2011, where he joined his Ajax teammate Jan-Arie van der Heijden. On 5 February 2010, Donald scored on his debut for the club from Tilburg in a 2–1 loss to NAC Breda. Playing with Willem II, Donald collected 18 appearances at total, including 4 matches in relegation play-off.

=== Roda JC ===
On 2 February 2011, Donald signed a contract for Roda JC, but he first joined on 1 July 2011 to his new team. Donald made his official debut for Roda JC replacing Laurent Delorge in 3–0 defeat against Feyenoord on 13 August 2011. While with the club, Donald collected 102 matches in all competitions for three seasons at total, scoring 16 goals.

=== Mordovia ===
In summer 2014, he signed with Russian Premier League side Mordovia Saransk.

=== Red Star Belgrade ===
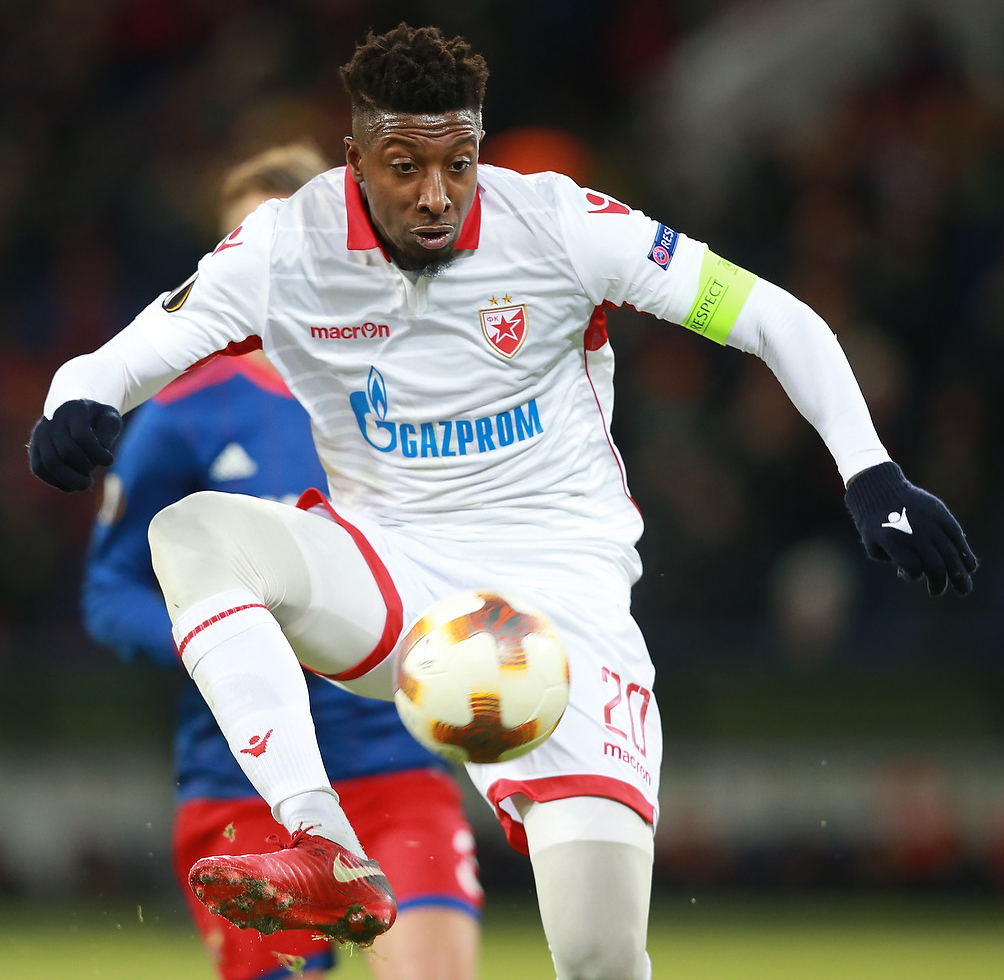
Donald playing for Red Star Belgrade in the UEFA Europa League, 2018

On 12 August 2015, he signed a 6-months loan deal with Serbian side Red Star Belgrade, with option for permanent 2-year deal, under the condition that he appear in more than half the league games until the 2015–16 winter break. On 18 January 2016, it was announced that Donald had signed a 1.5-year contract with Red Star lasting until June 2017. In March 2016, it was announced that his gross salary amounts to 1,005,030 euros.

On 27 July 2017, Donald became the first foreign captain in the club history, leading the team in 2–0 victory over Sparta Prague. He made his hundredth appearance for the club in the Eternal Derby, played on 13 December 2017. Scoring a goal in 2–1 away victory over Vojvodina on 7 March 2018, Donald archived his 104 match for Red Star Belgrade, equalising with Carlos Eduardo de Fiori Mendes as a most capable foreign footballer in the club history. Several days later, on Friday 9 March, he was hospitalised due to cardiac problems.

On 14 April 2018, Donald became the most capped foreign footballer in the club's history. Replacing Nemanja Radonjić in 81-minute of the Eternal Derby, Donald noted his 105th official game with Red Star Belgrade. He had been sent off after conflict with Seydouba Soumah on the field in last minutes of the match. On 19 May 2018, Donald scored in the final match of the 2017–18 Serbian SuperLiga season, against Voždovac for winning the second trophy with the club. The match was noted as his last under contract with Red Star, after he refused to sign new deal.

=== Yeni Malatyaspor ===
Donald moved to Turkey in summer 2018 by signing with Yeni Malatyaspor.

=== Grafičar Beograd ===
In January 2023, after a year and a half without a club, Donald joined Serbian First League club Grafičar Beograd on tryout.

== International career ==
Born in the Netherlands, Donald is of Surinamese descent. He made 3 appearances for the Netherlands Under-21 team in 2009. He debuted with the Suriname national team in a 6–0 2022 FIFA World Cup qualification win over Bermuda on 4 June 2021. A few weeks later on 25 June Donald was named to the Suriname squad for the 2021 CONCACAF Gold Cup.

== Personal life ==
He is the older brother of the footballer Joël Donald. In late 2017, Donald owned a hookah lounge in Belgrade. Donald is the father of 2 daughters and is married to Esra Donald.

== Career statistics ==
As of end of 2020—21 season

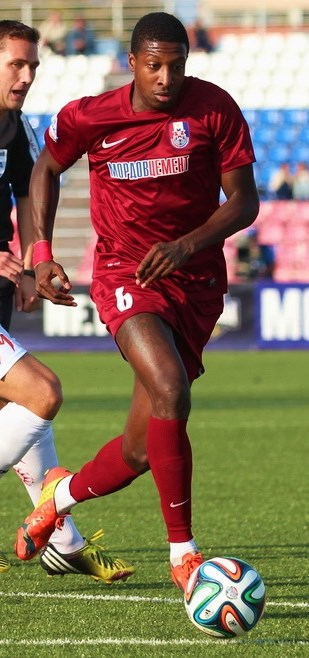
Donald playing with Mordovia in 2014

Appearances and goals by club, season and competition
Club	Season	League			National cup		Continental		Other		Total	
Club	Season	Division	Apps	Goals	Apps	Goals	Apps	Goals	Apps	Goals	Apps	Goals
Ajax	2006–07	Eredivisie	0	0	0	0	1	0	—		1	0
Ajax	2007–08	Eredivisie	3	0	0	0	—		—		3	0
Ajax	2008–09	Eredivisie	0	0	0	0	0	0	0	0	0	0
Ajax	2009–10	Eredivisie	5	1	0	0	3	0	—		8	1
Ajax	2010–11	Eredivisie	0	0	0	0	0	0	—		0	0
Ajax	Total		8	1	0	0	4	0	—		12	1
Willem II (loan)	2009–10	Eredivisie	14	1	0	0	—		4 (Note: Appearances in the relegation play-offs)	0	18	1
Roda	2011–12	Eredivisie	31	4	2	2	—		—		33	6
Roda	2012–13	Eredivisie	30	2	1	0	—		4	2	35	4
Roda	2013–14	Eredivisie	30	6	4	0	—		—		34	6
Roda	Total		91	12	7	0	—		4	2	102	16
Mordovia	2014–15	Russian Premier League	12	1	0	0	—		—		12	1
Mordovia	2015–16	Russian Premier League	2	1	0	0	—		—		2	1
Mordovia	Total		14	2	0	0	—		—		14	2
Red Star	2015–16	Serbian SuperLiga	28 (Note: Donald spent the first half-season as a loaned player making 16 league and 2 cup appearances, after which he joined the club permanently)	2	2	0	—		—		30	2
Red Star	2016–17	Serbian SuperLiga	29	4 (Note: Including a goal scored on 17 May 2017 against Javor Ivanjica.)	5	0	6	2	—		40	6
Red Star	2017–18	Serbian SuperLiga	22	6	—		15	1	—		37	7
Red Star	Total		79	12	7	0	21	3	—		107	15
Yeni Malatyaspor	2018–19	Süper Lig	26	5	5	0	1	0	—		32	5
Yeni Malatyaspor	2019–20	Süper Lig	32	5	3	0	—		—		35	5
Yeni Malatyaspor	Total		58	10	8	0	1	0	—		67	10
BB Erzurumspor	2020–21	Süper Lig	16	1	2	0	0	0	—		18	1
Career total			280	39	24	2	26	3	8	2	338	46

== Honours ==
Ajax

- Eredivisie: 2010–11
- KNVB Cup: 2006–07
- Johan Cruijff Shield: 2007

Red Star Belgrade

- Serbian SuperLiga: 2015–16, 2017–18

Individual

- Serbian SuperLiga Team of the Season: 2015–16, 2016–17
