= Branko Jovičić =

Serbian association footballer

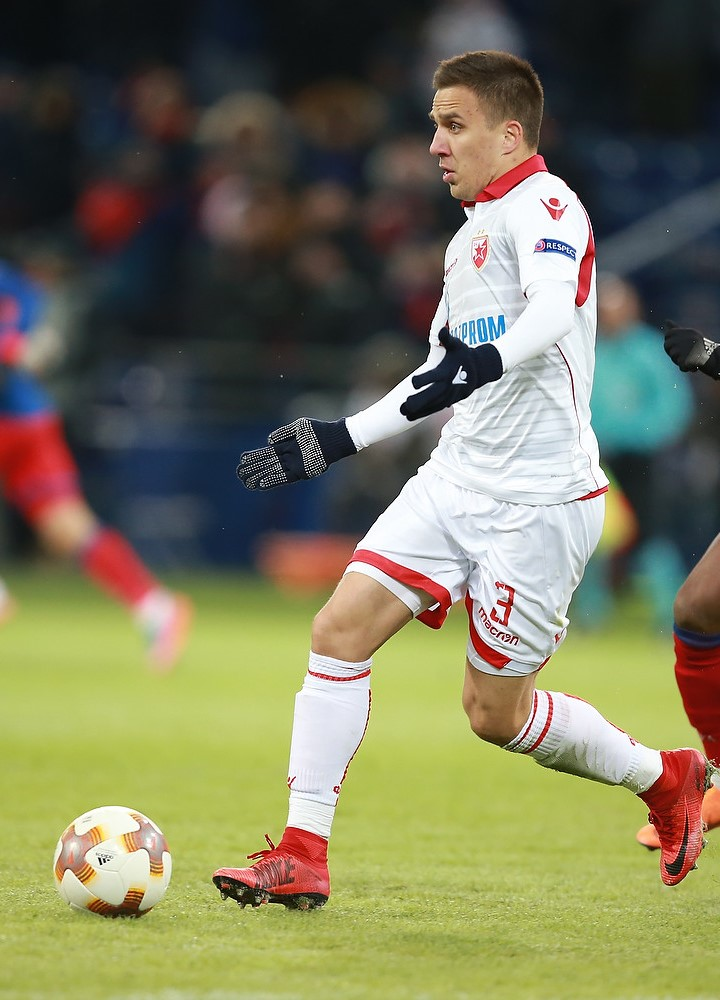
- Jovičić with Red Star Belgrade in 2018

Personal information
- Date of birth: 18 March 1993 (age 33)
- Place of birth: Raška, FR Yugoslavia
- Height: 1.79 m (5 ft 10 in)
- Position: Defensive midfielder

Team information
- Current team: Mladost Lučani
- Number: 32

Youth career
- 2008–2012: Borac Čačak

Senior career*
Years	Team	Apps	(Gls)
2012–2014	Borac Čačak	47	(0)
2014–2017	Amkar Perm	58	(4)
2017–2020	Red Star Belgrade	49	(3)
2020–2022	Ural Yekaterinburg	30	(0)
2022–2025	LASK	86	(2)
2025–2026	TSC	29	(0)
2026–	Mladost Lučani	0	(0)

International career
2018–2019	Serbia	2	(0)
- * Club domestic league appearances and goals as of 11 September 2026

Branko Jovičić (Serbian Cyrillic: Бранко Јовичић; born 18 March 1993) is a Serbian professional footballer who plays as a defensive midfielder for Mladost Lučani.

== Club career ==
=== Borac Čačak ===
Jovičić made his professional debut with Borac Čačak. By the beginning of the 2013–14 Serbian First League season, Jovičić was the youngest captain in the team's history. At the end of the season, Borac finished second overall and was promoted to the SuperLiga. Jovičić spent a total of six years at Borac Čačak before his first transfer to Amkar Perm.

=== Amkar Perm ===
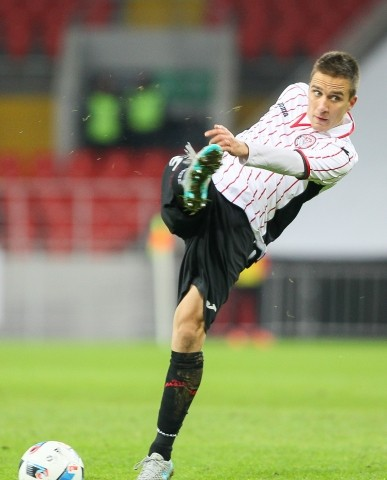
Jovičić in action for Amkar Perm in 2016

In August 2014, Jovičić signed a one-year contract with a provisional extension of two years for Russian team Amkar Perm. In his debut season with Amkar, Jovičić played 21 games and scored a total of three goals. As a result, Amkar gave Jovičić a pay increase after he agreed to extend his contract by two years.

=== Red Star Belgrade ===
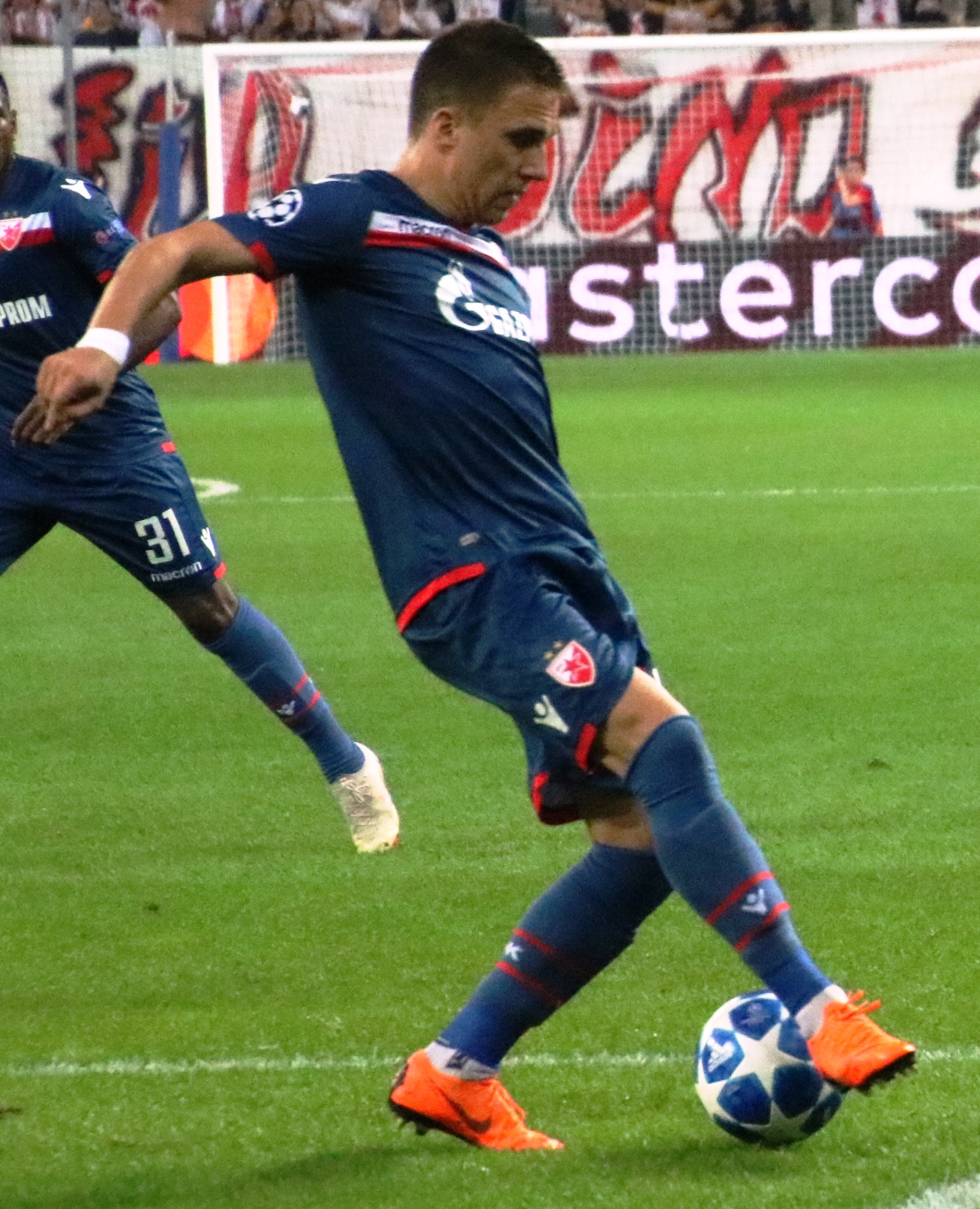
Jovičić in action for Red Star Belgrade in 2018 against Red Bull Salzburg

On 8 July 2017, Jovičić signed a three-year contract with Serbian side Red Star Belgrade. He made his debut for new club in first leg of the second qualifying round for 2017–18 UEFA Europa League, in a 1–1 draw against Irtysh Pavlodar. Jovičić was elected for the player of the match in 2–0 win against the same rival, in the second leg. Jovičić suffered a metatarsal bone fracture after a bad tackle by Nikola Drinčić during the match against Čukarički on 6 August 2017. On 29 November 2017, Jovičić scored his first goal for Red Star in a 5–0 victory over Radnik Surdulica after taking a penalty kick. The following season, Jovičić helped Red Star qualify to the group stage of the UEFA Champions League for the first time in club history. Jovičić started in three matches, while coming in as a substitution in two. Later that season, he helped Red Star reach the final of the Serbian cup and win the league title for a second season in a row. The following season, Jovičić would once again show why he had a place in Milojević's team. Unfortunately for him, an injury in the return leg in the second round against HJK Helsinki would see him on the sidelines for up to February 2020.

=== Ural Yekaterinburg ===
On 2 September 2020, he returned to Russia and signed with Ural Yekaterinburg.

=== LASK ===
On 5 February 2022, Jovičić signed a contract with LASK in Austria until 2025.

== International career ==
Jovičić was called up to Serbian senior squad in September 2018, to play during the UEFA Nations League. He made his international debut on 11 October 2018, as a 72nd-minute substitute against Montenegro in a 2–0 victory.

== Personal life ==
On 22 June 2020, he tested positive for COVID-19.

== Career statistics ==
=== Club ===
As of match played 23 May 2025

Appearances and goals by club, season and competition
Club	Season	League			National Cup		Continental		Total	
Club	Season	Division	Apps	Goals	Apps	Goals	Apps	Goals	Apps	Goals
Borac Čačak	2011–12	Serbian SuperLiga	0	0	0	0	—		0	0
Borac Čačak	2012–13	Serbian First League	24	0	3	0	—		27	0
Borac Čačak	2013–14	Serbian First League	23	0	2	0	—		25	0
Borac Čačak	Total		47	0	5	0	—		52	0
Amkar Perm	2014–15	Russian Premier League	21	3	1	0	—		22	3
Amkar Perm	2015–16	Russian Premier League	16	0	2	1	—		18	1
Amkar Perm	2016–17	Russian Premier League	21	1	1	0	—		22	1
Amkar Perm	Total		58	4	4	1	—		62	5
Red Star Belgrade	2017–18	Serbian SuperLiga	16	1	1	0	7	0	24	1
Red Star Belgrade	2018–19	Serbian SuperLiga	24	1	4	0	12	0	40	1
Red Star Belgrade	2019–20	Serbian SuperLiga	7	1	2	0	3	0	12	1
Red Star Belgrade	2020–21	Serbian SuperLiga	2	0	0	0	0	0	2	0
Red Star Belgrade	Total		49	3	7	0	22	0	78	3
Ural	2020–21	Russian Premier League	19	0	3	0	—		22	0
Ural	2021–22	Russian Premier League	11	0	2	0	—		13	0
Ural	Total		30	0	5	0	0	0	35	0
LASK	2021–22	Austrian Bundesliga	11	1	3	0	—		14	1
LASK	2022–23	Austrian Bundesliga	28	1	5	1	—		33	2
LASK	2023–24	Austrian Bundesliga	19	0	1	0	5 (Note: Appearances in UEFA Europa League)	1	25	1
LASK	2024–25	Austrian Bundesliga	28	0	5	1	6 (Note: Appearances in UEFA Conference League)	0	39	1
LASK	Total		86	2	14	2	11	1	111	5
Career total			270	9	35	3	33	1	338	13

== Honours ==
Red Star Belgrade

- Serbian SuperLiga: 2017–18, 2018–19, 2019–20
