= Kayacan Erdoğan =

Turkish footballer

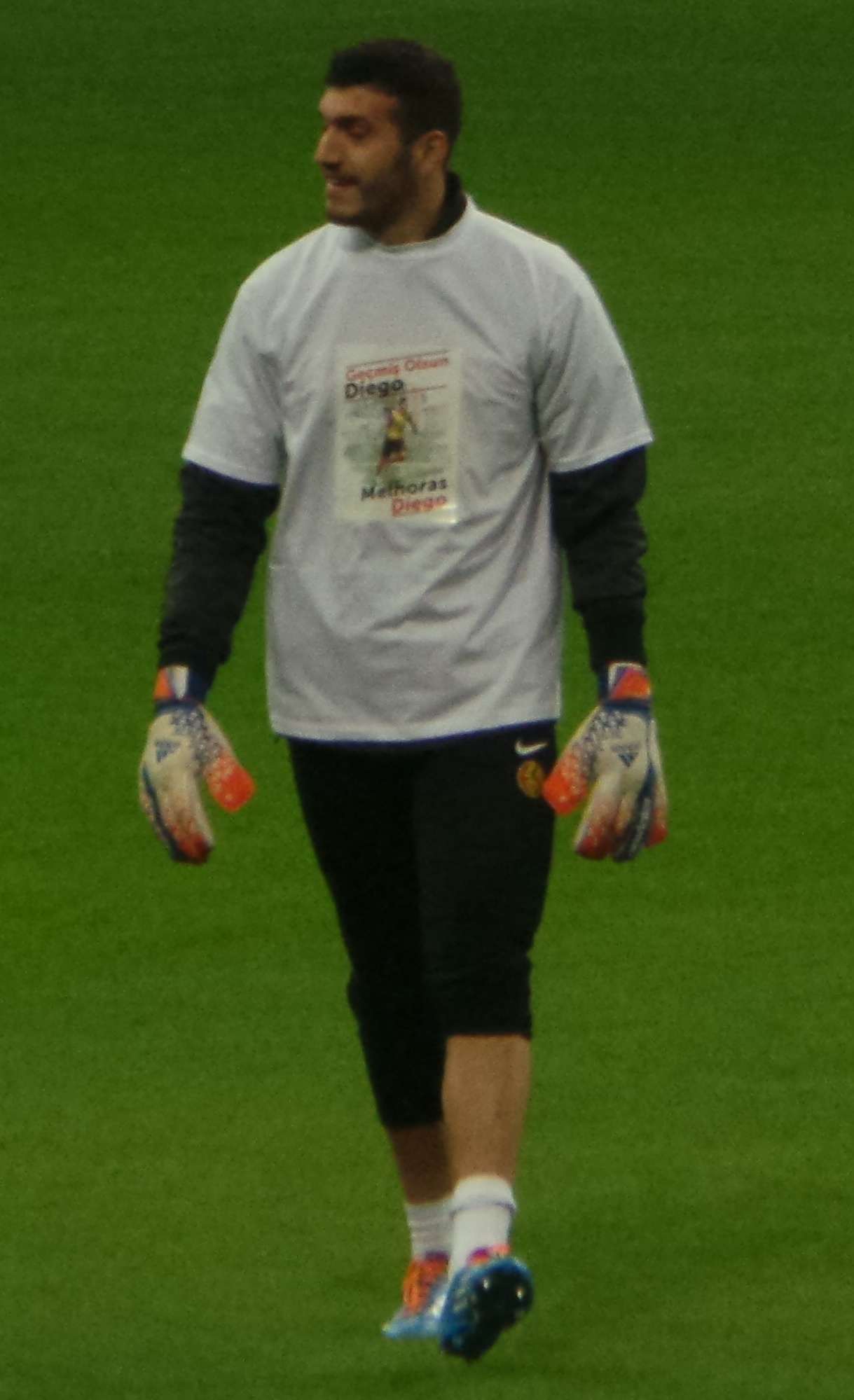
- Erdoğan warming up for Eskişehirspor in 2014

Personal information
- Date of birth: 21 March 1988 (age 38)
- Place of birth: Eskişehir, Turkey
- Height: 1.88 m (6 ft 2 in)
- Position: Goalkeeper

Team information
- Current team: Ankara Keçiörengücü
- Number: 88

Youth career
- 2002–2003: Eskişehir Şekerspor
- 2003–2006: Eskişehirspor

Senior career*
Years	Team	Apps	(Gls)
2006–2014	Eskişehirspor	11	(0)
2015–2016	Kayserispor	13	(0)
2016–2018	Eskişehirspor	37	(0)
2018–2019	Giresunspor	22	(0)
2019–2021	BB Erzurumspor	6	(0)
2022–	Ankara Keçiörengücü	1	(0)
- * Club domestic league appearances and goals as of 15 October 2022

Kayacan Erdoğan (born 21 March 1988) is a Turkish footballer who plays as a goalkeeper for Ankara Keçiörengücü.
