= Igor Kireyev =

Russian footballer

Igor Kireev
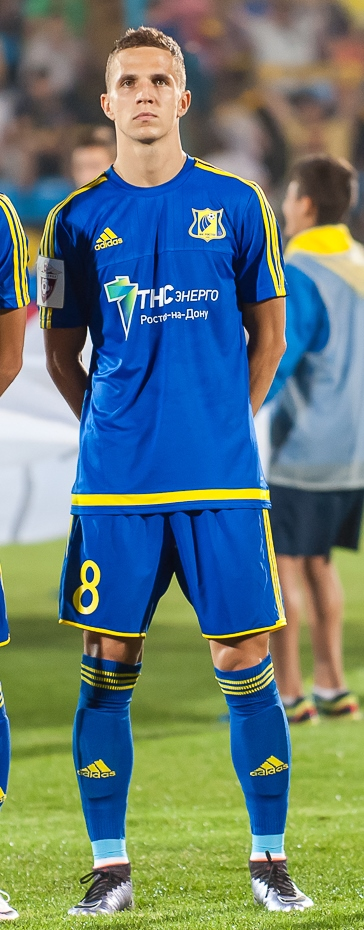
- Kireev with Rostov in 2016

Personal information
- Full name: Igor Olegovich Kireev
- Date of birth: 17 February 1992 (age 34)
- Place of birth: Zheleznogorsk, Russia
- Height: 1.79 m (5 ft 10 in)
- Positions: Defender; midfielder

Youth career
- Spartak Moscow

Senior career*
| Years | Team | Apps | (Gls) |
| 2010–2012 | Spartak Moscow | 1 | (0) |
| 2012–2018 | Rostov | 15 | (0) |
| 2014 | → Spartak Nalchik (loan) | 12 | (3) |
| 2014–2015 | → Amkar (loan) | 18 | (3) |
| 2018 | → Avangard Kursk (loan) | 7 | (2) |
| 2018–2019 | Mordovia Saransk | 34 | (3) |
| 2019–2020 | Yenisey Krasnoyarsk | 12 | (0) |
| 2020–2021 | Irtysh Omsk | 23 | (1) |

International career
| 2010 | Russia U-18 | 7 | (3) |
| 2010–2011 | Russia U-19 | 8 | (2) |
| 2012 | Russia U-21 | 1 | (0) |
- * Club domestic league appearances and goals

Igor Olegovich Kireev (Russian: Игорь Олегович Киреев; born 17 February 1992) is a Russian former professional football player who played as a right back or right midfielder.

== Club career ==
Kireev made his Russian Premier League debut on 14 March 2010 for Spartak Moscow in a game against Dynamo Moscow.

On 17 February 2014, Rostov announced loaning Kireev out to Spartak Nalchik for the remaining part of 2013–14 season.

He scored for Avangard Kursk but in vain as Tosno won the 2017–18 Russian Cup final against Avangard 2–1 on the 9 May 2018 in the Volgograd Arena. Before that, he scored the winning goal in the semi-final that allowed Avangard to advance to the final.

== Career statistics ==
| Club | Season | League | | | Cup | | Continental | | Other | | Total | |
| Club | Season | Division | Apps | Goals | Apps | Goals | Apps | Goals | Apps | Goals | Apps | Goals |
|---|---|---|---|---|---|---|---|---|---|---|---|---|
| Spartak Moscow | 2010 | Russian Premier League | 1 | 0 | 0 | 0 | 0 | 0 | – | | 1 | 0 |
| Spartak Moscow | 2011–12 | Russian Premier League | 0 | 0 | 0 | 0 | 0 | 0 | – | | 0 | 0 |
| Spartak Moscow | Total | | 1 | 0 | 0 | 0 | 0 | 0 | 0 | 0 | 1 | 0 |
| Rostov | 2012–13 | Russian Premier League | 0 | 0 | 0 | 0 | – | | 0 | 0 | 0 | 0 |
| Rostov | 2013–14 | Russian Premier League | 0 | 0 | 0 | 0 | – | | – | | 0 | 0 |
| Rostov | 2015–16 | Russian Premier League | 1 | 0 | 0 | 0 | – | | – | | 1 | 0 |
| Rostov | 2016–17 | Russian Premier League | 11 | 0 | 1 | 0 | 3 (Note: Two appearances in the UEFA Champions League, one appearance in the UEFA Europa League) | 0 | – | | 15 | 0 |
| Rostov | 2017–18 | Russian Premier League | 3 | 0 | 0 | 0 | – | | – | | 3 | 0 |
| Rostov | Total | | 15 | 0 | 1 | 0 | 3 | 0 | 0 | 0 | 19 | 0 |
| Spartak Nalchik (loan) | 2013–14 | Russian First League | 12 | 3 | – | | – | | – | | 12 | 3 |
| Amkar (loan) | 2014–15 | Russian Premier League | 18 | 3 | 0 | 0 | – | | – | | 18 | 3 |
| Avangard Kursk (loan) | 2017–18 | Russian First League | 7 | 2 | 3 | 2 | – | | – | | 10 | 4 |
| Mordovia Saransk | 2018–19 | Russian First League | 34 | 3 | 1 | 0 | – | | 5 (Note: Appearances in the FNL Cup) | 0 | 40 | 3 |
| Yenisey Krasnoyarsk | 2019–20 | Russian First League | 12 | 0 | 0 | 0 | – | | 2 | 0 | 14 | 0 |
| Yenisey Krasnoyarsk | 2020–21 | Russian First League | 0 | 0 | 0 | 0 | – | | – | | 0 | 0 |
| Yenisey Krasnoyarsk | Total | | 12 | 0 | 0 | 0 | 0 | 0 | 2 | 0 | 14 | 0 |
| Irtysh Omsk | 2020–21 | Russian First League | 23 | 1 | – | | – | | – | | 23 | 1 |
| Career total | | | 122 | 12 | 5 | 2 | 3 | 0 | 7 | 0 | 137 | 14 |
