= Batuhan Ünsal =

Turkish association football player

Personal information
- Date of birth: 3 June 1997 (age 29)
- Place of birth: Antalya, Turkey
- Height: 1.85 m (6 ft 1 in)
- Position: Goalkeeper

Youth career
- 2007–2010: Fenerbahçe
- 2010–2011: Selimiye
- 2011–2016: Manavgatspor

Senior career*
Years	Team	Apps	(Gls)
2016–2017	Manavgatspor	2	(0)
2017–2018	Silivrispor	13	(0)
2018–2019	Ankaraspor	4	(0)
2019–2021	BB Erzurumspor	1	(0)
2021–2022	Sarıyer	3	(0)
2022	Ergene Velimeşe	1	(0)
- * Club domestic league appearances and goals as of 7 May 2022

Batuhan Ünsal (born 3 June 1997) is a Turkish professional footballer who plays as a goalkeeper.

== Professional career ==
Ünsal made his professional debut with Erzurumspor in a 3-1 Süper Lig win over Yeni Malatyaspor on 27 December 2020.
