= Gökhan Kardeş =

Turkish footballer

Personal information
- Date of birth: 15 May 1997 (age 29)
- Place of birth: Heusden-Zolder, Belgium
- Height: 1.87 m (6 ft 2 in)
- Position: Centre back

Team information
- Current team: Turkse Rangers
- Number: 59

Youth career
- –2005: Turkse FC
- 2005–2016: PSV

Senior career*
Years	Team	Apps	(Gls)
2016–2018	PSV	0	(0)
2016–2018	→ Jong PSV	13	(0)
2018	→ Juventus București (loan)	12	(0)
2018–2019	Beerschot Wilrijk	1	(0)
2019	→ Afjet Afyonspor (loan)	10	(0)
2019–2022	BB Erzurumspor	38	(0)
2022–2023	Boluspor	1	(0)
2022–2023	→ Esenler Erokspor (loan)	5	(0)
2023–2025	Manisa 1965 SK		
2025–	Turkse Rangers		

International career
2013	Turkey U16	6	(0)
2013	Belgium U17	2	(0)
2014	Turkey U18	5	(0)
2015–2016	Turkey U19	5	(0)
2018	Turkey U20	5	(0)
2018	Turkey U21	1	(0)
- * Club domestic league appearances and goals as of 15 January 2026

Gökhan Kardeş (born 15 May 1997) is a professional footballer who plays as a centre back for Turkse Rangers. Born in Belgium, he represents Turkey internationally.

== Career ==
Kardes made his professional debut as Jong PSV player in the second division on 8 August 2016 against FC Den Bosch.
