= Mehmet Murat Uçar =

Turkish footballer

Personal information
- Date of birth: 1 August 1991 (age 35)
- Place of birth: Muş, Turkey
- Height: 1.69 m (5 ft 7 in)
- Position: Right back

Team information
- Current team: Kayserispor
- Number: 7

Youth career
- 2007–2009: Pendikspor

Senior career*
Years	Team	Apps	(Gls)
2009–2011	Pendikspor	0	(0)
2009–2010	→ Beylerbeyi (loan)	8	(0)
2011–2013	Beylerbeyi	44	(4)
2013–2014	Sivas Dört Eylülspor	29	(5)
2014–2016	Aydınspor	50	(12)
2016–2017	Eskişehirspor	19	(3)
2017–2019	Altınordu	66	(4)
2019–2021	BB Erzurumspor	58	(0)
2021–2022	Ankaragücü	35	(4)
2022–2024	Eyüpspor	60	(0)
2024–2026	Amedspor	69	(2)
2026–	Kayserispor	10	(0)
- * Club domestic league appearances and goals as of 14 October 2026

Mehmet Murat Uçar (born 1 August 1991) is a Turkish professional footballer who plays as a rightback for TFF 1. Lig club Kayserispor.

== Career ==
A youth product of Pendikspor, Uçar was promoted to their senior team in 2009 and from there went on loan to Beylerbeyi. He transferred to Beylerbeyi after his loan ended, and from there spent his early career with semi-pro clubs Sivas Dört Eylülspor and Aydınspor. In January 2016, he signed a professional contract with Eskişehirspor. Uçar made his professional debut with Eskişehirspor in a 2-1 Süper Lig win over Sivasspor on 24 January 2016. He transferred to Altınordu in the TFF First League the following season, in 2017. On 18 July 2019, he signed with BB Erzurumspor and after a strong debut season, helped them get promoted into the Süper Lig for the 2020–21 season.
