= Oltan Karakullukçu =

Turkish footballer

Personal information
- Date of birth: 7 July 1991 (age 35)
- Place of birth: Gümüşhane, Turkey
- Height: 1.88 m (6 ft 2 in)
- Position: Forward

Team information
- Current team: 68 Aksaray Belediyespor
- Number: 61

Youth career
- 2002–2009: Gümüşhanespor

Senior career*
Years	Team	Apps	(Gls)
2009–2010	Gümüşhanespor	21	(2)
2010–2013	Boluspor	7	(0)
2012	→ Sandıklıspor (loan)	15	(3)
2012–2013	→ Sarayköy (loan)	18	(1)
2013–2015	Derincespor	40	(6)
2015–2016	BB Erzurumspor	30	(6)
2016–2017	Bayburt	33	(10)
2017–2019	Afyonspor	79	(42)
2019–2022	BB Erzurumspor	58	(7)
2022–2023	Pendikspor	11	(2)
2023–2024	Gençlerbirliği	26	(1)
2024–2025	Ankaraspor	22	(3)
2025	24 Erzincanspor	13	(4)
2026	Isparta 32	11	(1)
2026–	68 Aksaray Belediyespor	3	(0)

International career
2009	Turkey U19	3	(1)
- * Club domestic league appearances and goals as of 1 October 2026

Oltan Karakullukçu (born 7 July 1991) is a Turkish professional footballer who plays as a forward for TFF 2. Lig club 68 Aksaray Belediyespor.

== Career ==
Karakullukçu is a youth product of Gümüşhanespor, and spent his early career in the amateur leagues of Turkey. He made his professional debut with BB Erzurumspor at the age of 29, in a 2–1 Süper Lig win over MKE Ankaragücü on 13 September 2020. He scored both late goals in his debut after coming on as a sub in the 55th minute.
