= Osman Çelik =

Turkish footballer

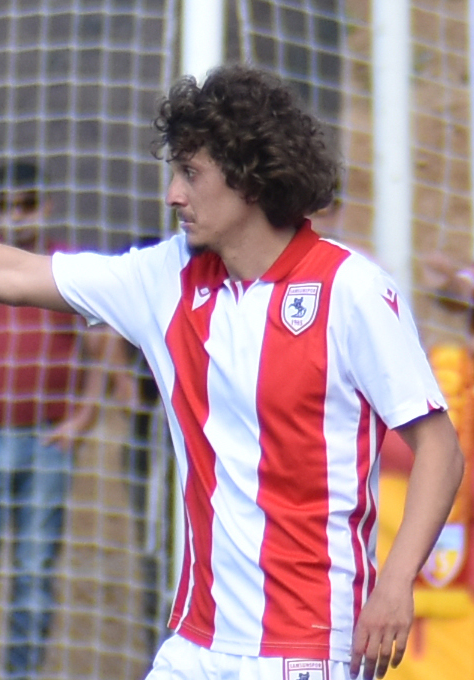
- Çelik in 2021

Personal information
- Date of birth: 27 November 1991 (age 34)
- Place of birth: Antalya, Turkey
- Height: 1.82 m (6 ft 0 in)
- Positions: Defensive midfielder; centre-back

Team information
- Current team: Ankaragücü
- Number: 88

Youth career
- 2002–2011: Antalyaspor

Senior career*
Years	Team	Apps	(Gls)
2011–2012	Kepez Belediyespor	18	(0)
2012–2013	Antalyaspor	0	(0)
2012–2013	→ Kepez Belediyespor (loan)	14	(0)
2012–2013	→ Manavgatspor (loan)	3	(0)
2013–2014	Manavgatspor	33	(1)
2014–2019	Antalyaspor	24	(0)
2015–2018	→ Karabükspor (loan)	45	(1)
2019–2021	BB Erzurumspor	55	(1)
2021–2024	Samsunspor	85	(4)
2024–	Ankaragücü	33	(0)
- * Club domestic league appearances and goals as of 15 June 2025

Osman Çelik (born 27 November 1991) is a Turkish footballer who plays as a defensive midfielder or centre-back for Ankaragücü.

== Career ==
Çelik is a youth product of the youth academy of Antalyaspor, and began his senior career with Kepez Belediyespor in 2011. He returned to Antalyaspor in 2012, going on successive loans to Kepez Belediyespor and Manavgatspor, before signing permanently with the latter. He once more returned to Antalyaspor in 2014 where he played in the Süper Lig, with loans in between at Karabükspor. He transferred to BB Erzurumspor in 2021 where he played for 2 years. On 1 July 2021, he transferred to Samsunspor, signing a 2+1 year agreement.
