= Cenk Ahmet Alkılıç =

Turkish footballer

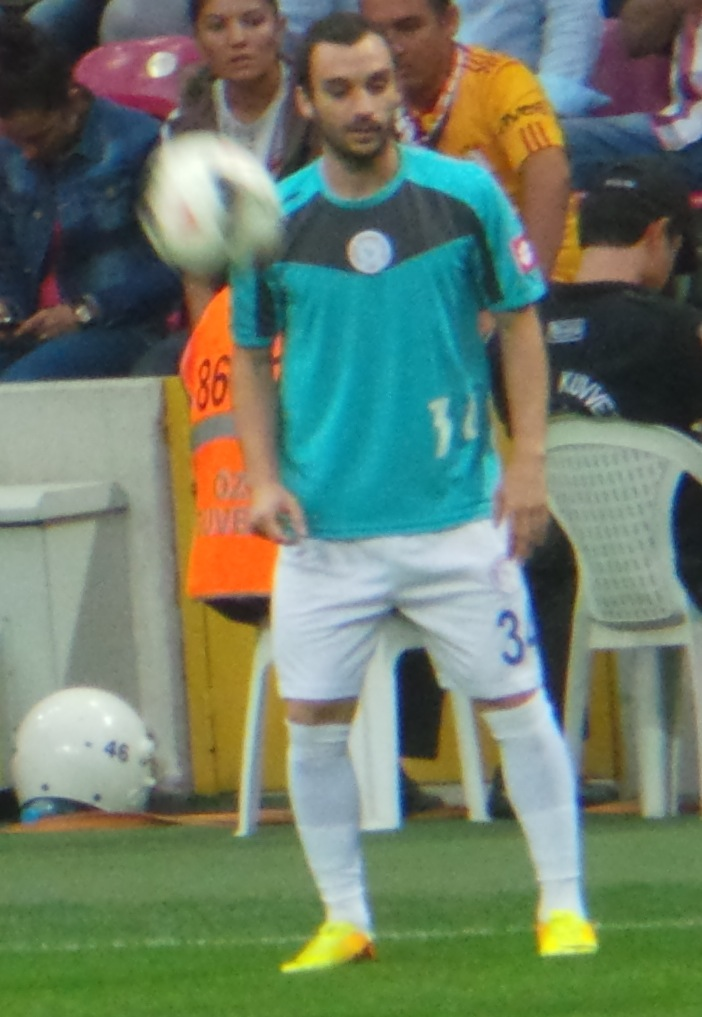
- Cenk Ahmet Alkılıç (2013)

Personal information
- Date of birth: 9 December 1987 (age 38)
- Place of birth: Karşıyaka, Turkey
- Height: 1.77 m (5 ft 10 in)
- Position: Defender

Team information
- Current team: Güzide Gebzespor
- Number: 53

Youth career
- 1999–2002: Galatasaray
- 2002–2003: Beykoz 1908
- 2003–2006: Beylerbeyi

Senior career*
Years	Team	Apps	(Gls)
2006–2009	Beylerbeyi	72	(9)
2009–2011	Altay	59	(3)
2011–2014	Çaykur Rizespor	79	(14)
2014	→ Kayseri Erciyesspor (loan)	16	(0)
2014–2015	Kayseri Erciyesspor	26	(3)
2015–2017	İstanbul Başakşehir	20	(0)
2017	→ Alanyaspor (loan)	6	(0)
2017–2019	Alanyaspor	35	(1)
2019–2021	BB Erzurumspor	47	(3)
2021–2023	Eyüpspor	55	(4)
2023	Boluspor	2	(0)
2023–2025	Karşıyaka	47	(6)
2025–	Güzide Gebzespor	8	(1)

International career
2011	Turkey A2	2	(0)
- * Club domestic league appearances and goals as of 30 November 2025

Cenk Ahmet Alkılıç (born 9 December 1987) is a Turkish footballer who plays as a defender for TFF 2. Lig club Güzide Gebzespor. He made his professional debut in 2006 with Beylerbeyi.

== Career statistics ==
As of 5 July 2020

Club	Season	League			Cup (Note: All appearances in the Turkish Cup)		Continental		Total	
Club	Season	Division	Apps	Goals	Apps	Goals	Apps	Goals	Apps	Goals
Beylerbeyi	2005–06	TFF Third League	2	0	–		—		2	0
Beylerbeyi	2006–07	TFF Third League	10	0	–		—		10	0
Beylerbeyi	2007–08	TFF Third League	29	5	–		—		29	5
Beylerbeyi	2008–09	TFF Second League	31	4	1	1	—		32	5
Beylerbeyi	Total		72	9	1	1	0	0	73	10
Altay	2009–10	TFF First League	29	1	5	2	—		34	3
Altay	2010–11	TFF First League	30	2	1	0	—		31	2
Altay	Total		59	3	6	2	0	0	65	5
Çaykur Rizespor	2011–12	TFF First League	32	4	2	0	—		34	4
Çaykur Rizespor	2012–13	TFF First League	33	10	1	0	—		34	10
Çaykur Rizespor	2013–14	Süper Lig	14	0	2	0	—		16	0
Çaykur Rizespor	Total		79	14	5	0	0	0	84	14
Kayseri Erciyesspor (loan)	2013–14	Süper Lig	16	0	0	0	—		16	0
Kayseri Erciyesspor	2014–15	Süper Lig	26	3	1	0	—		27	3
İstanbul Başakşehir	2015–16	Süper Lig	17	0	8	0	2 (Note: Appearances in the UEFA Europa League)	0	27	0
İstanbul Başakşehir	2016–17	Süper Lig	3	0	3	0	3	0	9	0
İstanbul Başakşehir	Total		20	0	11	0	5	0	36	0
Alanyaspor (loan)	2016–17	Süper Lig	6	0	0	0	—		6	0
Alanyaspor	2017–18	Süper Lig	18	1	3	0	—		21	1
Alanyaspor	2018–19	Süper Lig	17	0	2	0	—		19	0
Alanyaspor	Total		35	1	5	0	0	0	40	1
BB Erzurumspor	2019–20	TFF First League	17	0	3	0	—		20	0
Career total			330	30	32	3	5	0	367	33
