= 2013–14 FC Spartak Moscow season =

Spartak Moscow
2013–14 season
- Chairman: Leonid Fedun
- Manager: Valeri Karpin until 18 March; Dmitri Gunko (Caretaker); 18 March-2 April; Dmitri Gunko from 2 April
- Stadium: Luzhniki Stadium
- Premier League: 6th
- Russian Cup: Round of 16 vs Tosno
- UEFA Europa League: Play-off round vs St. Gallen
- Top goalscorer: League: Yura Movsisyan (16); All: Yura Movsisyan (18)
Home colours	Away colours

The 2013–14 Spartak Moscow season was their 22nd season in the Russian Premier League, the highest tier of association football in Russia. They finished the season in 6th, reached the Round of 16 in the Russian Cup and were knocked out 2013–14 UEFA Europa League at the playoff stage by St. Gallen.

== Season events ==
On 18 March, Valeri Karpin left his role as manager of Spartak, with Dmitri Gunko being placed in temporary charge. On 2 April, Gunko was announced as the club's manager until the end of the season.

Following the conclusion of the season, Russian Cup winners FC Rostov were excluded from the 2014-15 Europa League due to financial issues, with Spartak being appointed their replacement. However the decision was later overturned but CAS and Rostov took their place in the Europa League.

== Squad ==
As of match played 15 May 2014

No.	Name	Nationality	Position	Date of birth (age)	Signed from	Signed in	Contract ends	Apps.	Goals
Goalkeepers
12	Anton Mitryushkin	(Russia)	GK	8 February 1996 (aged 18)	Youth Team	2012		3	0
27	Mikhail Filippov	(Russia)	GK	10 June 1992 (aged 21)	Znamya Truda Orekhovo-Zuyevo	2014		0	0
30	Sergei Pesyakov	(Russia)	GK	28 May 1988 (aged 25)	Shinnik Yaroslavl	2009		34	0
31	Andriy Dykan	(Ukraine)	GK	16 July 1977 (aged 36)	Terek Grozny	2010		90	0
32	Artyom Rebrov	(Russia)	GK	4 March 1984 (aged 30)	Shinnik Yaroslavl	2011		25	0
42	Vladislav Teryoshkin	(Russia)	GK	16 July 1995 (aged 18)	Youth Team	2012		0	0
43	Yuri Shleyev	(Russia)	GK	26 June 1995 (aged 18)	Mashuk-KMV Pyatigorsk	2013		0	0
56	Vadim Averkiyev	(Russia)	GK	1 June 1997 (aged 16)	Youth Team	2013		0	0
63	Ilya Sukhoruchenko	(Russia)	GK	23 February 1998 (aged 16)	Youth Team	2013		0	0
81	Yuriy Shcherbakov	(Russia)	GK	11 April 1996 (aged 18)	Youth Team	2013		0	0
Defenders
3	Sergei Bryzgalov	(Russia)	DF	15 November 1992 (aged 21)	Saturn Ramenskoye	2011		38	1
4	Sergei Parshivlyuk	(Russia)	DF	18 March 1989 (aged 25)	Youth Team	2007		125	3
7	Kirill Kombarov	(Russia)	DF	22 January 1987 (aged 27)	Dynamo Moscow	2010		82	3
18	Ilya Kutepov	(Russia)	DF	29 July 1993 (aged 20)	Akademiya Tolyatti	2012		1	0
23	Dmitri Kombarov	(Russia)	DF	22 January 1987 (aged 27)	Dynamo Moscow	2010		139	21
33	Salvatore Bocchetti	(Italy)	DF	30 November 1986 (aged 27)	Rubin Kazan	2013		22	0
34	Yevgeni Makeyev	(Russia)	DF	24 July 1989 (aged 24)	Youth Team	2008		156	4
35	Serdar Tasci	(Germany)	DF	24 April 1987 (aged 27)	VfB Stuttgart	2013		4	0
38	Konstantin Shcherbakov	(Russia)	DF	20 March 1997 (aged 17)	Youth team	2013		0	0
44	Nikolai Fadeyev	(Russia)	DF	9 May 1993 (aged 21)	Youth Team	2010		1	0
45	Aleksandr Putsko	(Russia)	DF	24 February 1993 (aged 21)	Youth Team	2010		1	0
48	Aleksandr Stepanov	(Russia)	DF	10 January 1994 (aged 20)	Youth team	2011		0	0
54	Yegor Yevteyev	(Russia)	DF	1 April 1996 (aged 18)	Youth team	2012		0	0
55	João Carlos	(Brazil)	DF	1 January 1982 (aged 32)	Anzhi Makhachkala	2013		16	0
62	Aydar Lisinkov	(Russia)	DF	2 January 1994 (aged 20)	Youth team	2012		0	0
64	Denis Kutin	(Russia)	DF	5 October 1993 (aged 20)	Youth Team	2010		0	0
65	Yaroslav Shmygov	(Russia)	DF	6 April 1994 (aged 20)	Youth team	2012		0	0
68	Aleksei Ivanushkin	(Russia)	DF	20 November 1996 (aged 17)	Youth team	2013		0	0
71	Aleksandr Likhachyov	(Russia)	DF	22 July 1996 (aged 17)	Youth team	2012		0	0
74	Valentin Vinnichenko	(Russia)	DF	21 April 1995 (aged 19)	Youth team	2012		0	0
75	Aleksei Grechkin	(Russia)	DF	6 February 1996 (aged 18)	Youth team	2012		0	0
77	Soslan Gatagov	(Russia)	DF	29 September 1992 (aged 21)	Lokomotiv Moscow	2012		5	0
80	Ivan Khomukha	(Russia)	DF	14 July 1994 (aged 19)	Youth Team	2010		0	0
82	Yevgeni Yezhov	(Russia)	DF	11 February 1995 (aged 19)	Youth team	2012		0	0
85	Anton Fedotov	(Russia)	DF	29 March 1996 (aged 18)	Youth team	2012		0	0
Midfielders
5	Tino Costa	(Argentina)	MF	9 January 1985 (aged 29)	Valencia	2013		27	3
6	Rafael Carioca	(Brazil)	MF	18 June 1989 (aged 24)	Grêmio	2009	2013	138	2
8	Denis Glushakov	(Russia)	MF	27 January 1987 (aged 27)	Lokomotiv Moscow	2013		30	1
11	Aras Özbiliz	(Armenia)	MF	9 March 1990 (aged 24)	Kuban Krasnodar	2013		30	4
15	Rômulo	(Brazil)	MF	19 September 1990 (aged 23)	Vasco da Gama	2012		17	1
19	José Jurado	(Spain)	MF	29 June 1986 (aged 27)	Schalke 04	2013		56	11
20	Patrick Ebert	(Germany)	MF	17 March 1987 (aged 27)	Real Valladolid	2014		7	0
26	Anton Khodyrev	(Russia)	MF	26 January 1992 (aged 22)	Youth Team	2009		4	0
36	Igor Konovalov	(Russia)	MF	8 July 1996 (aged 17)	Youth team	2013		0	0
40	Artyom Timofeyev	(Russia)	MF	12 January 1994 (aged 20)	Your team	2012		1	0
47	Andrei Svyatov	(Russia)	MF	2 May 1993 (aged 21)	Your team	2012		0	0
50	Alexandr Manyukov	(Russia)	MF	27 January 1993 (aged 21)	Youth team	2013		0	0
52	Igor Leontyev	(Russia)	MF	18 March 1994 (aged 20)	Your team	2011		0	0
53	Artyom Samsonov	(Russia)	MF	5 January 1994 (aged 20)	Your team	2011		0	0
59	Maxim Yermakov	(Russia)	MF	21 April 1995 (aged 19)	Youth team	2012		0	0
60	Konstantin Savichev	(Russia)	MF	6 March 1994 (aged 20)	Your team	2011		0	0
61	Vladimir Zubarev	(Russia)	MF	5 January 1993 (aged 21)	Youth team	2010		0	0
66	Rahim Sadykhov	(Azerbaijan)	MF	18 July 1996 (aged 17)	Youth team	2013		0	0
73	Ayaz Guliyev	(Russia)	MF	27 November 1996 (aged 17)	Youth team	2012		0	0
76	Pavel Globa	(Russia)	MF	31 May 1995 (aged 18)	Youth team	2012		0	0
79	Vladislav Masternoy	(Russia)	MF	17 November 1995 (aged 18)	Youth team	2012		0	0
83	Vladislav Panteleyev	(Russia)	MF	15 August 1996 (aged 17)	Youth team	2012		0	0
86	Danila Buranov	(Russia)	MF	11 February 1996 (aged 18)	Youth team	2012		0	0
87	Aleksandr Zuyev	(Russia)	MF	26 June 1996 (aged 17)	Youth team	2013		0	0
99	Vladlen Babayev	(Russia)	MF	12 October 1996 (aged 17)	Youth team	2012		0	0
Forwards
9	Lucas Barrios	(Paraguay)	FW	13 November 1984 (aged 29)	Guangzhou Evergrande	2013		19	1
10	Yura Movsisyan	(Armenia)	FW	2 August 1987 (aged 26)	Krasnodar	2012		38	21
14	Pavel Yakovlev	(Russia)	FW	7 April 1991 (aged 23)	Youth Team	2008		83	11
22	Aleksandr Kozlov	(Russia)	FW	19 March 1993 (aged 21)	Youth team	2009		27	1
37	Vladislav Kormishin	(Russia)	FW	18 August 1995 (aged 18)	Youth team	2013		0	0
41	Vladimir Obukhov	(Russia)	FW	8 February 1992 (aged 22)	Youth Team	2008		5	0
57	Vyacheslav Krotov	(Russia)	FW	1 January 1991 (aged 23)	Volgar Astrakhan	2012		2	0
67	Artyom Fedchuk	(Russia)	FW	20 December 1994 (aged 19)	Youth team	2011		0	0
69	Denis Davydov	(Russia)	FW	22 March 1995 (aged 19)	Youth team	2012		2	0
70	Ippei Shinozuka	(Japan)	FW	20 March 1995 (aged 19)	Youth team	2012		0	0
78	Zelimkhan Bakayev	(Russia)	FW	1 July 1996 (aged 17)	Youth team	2013		0	0
84	Alexandr Yuryev	(Russia)	FW	31 October 1996 (aged 17)	Youth team	2013		0	0
97	Said-Ali Akhmayev	(Russia)	FW	30 May 1996 (aged 17)	Youth team	2013		0	0
Away on loan
2	Juan Insaurralde	(Argentina)	DF	3 October 1984 (aged 29)	Boca Juniors	2012		28	1
5	Nicolás Pareja	(Argentina)	DF	19 January 1984 (aged 30)	Espanyol	2010		61	3
10	Artem Dzyuba	(Russia)	FW	22 August 1988 (aged 25)	Youth Team	2006		144	28
11	Welliton	(Brazil)	FW	22 October 1986 (aged 27)	Goiás	2007		125	60
16	Demy de Zeeuw	(Netherlands)	MF	26 May 1983 (aged 30)	AFC Ajax	2011		33	3
17	Marek Suchý	(Czech Republic)	DF	29 March 1988 (aged 26)	Slavia Prague	2010		110	4
21	Kim Källström	(Sweden)	MF	24 August 1982 (aged 31)	Lyon	2012		39	3
25	Diniyar Bilyaletdinov	(Russia)	MF	27 February 1985 (aged 29)	Everton	2012		30	4
27	Aleksandr Zotov	(Russia)	MF	27 August 1990 (aged 23)	Youth Team	2008		17	0
28	Majeed Waris	(Ghana)	FW	19 September 1991 (aged 22)	BK Häcken	2013		12	1
49	Jano Ananidze	(Georgia (country))	MF	10 October 1992 (aged 21)	Youth Team	2009		76	11
51	Dmitri Kayumov	(Russia)	MF	11 May 1992 (aged 22)	Youth Team	2009		1	0
Players that left Spartak Moscow during the season
1	Nikolai Zabolotny	(Russia)	GK	16 April 1990 (aged 24)	Youth Team	2010		7	0
8	Aiden McGeady	(Republic of Ireland)	MF	4 April 1986 (aged 28)	Celtic	2010	2014	93	13
9	Ari	(Brazil)	FW	1 December 1985 (aged 28)	AZ	2010		110	28
20	Aleksandr Marenich	(Russia)	FW	29 April 1989 (aged 25)	Ural Sverdlovsk Oblast	2013		0	0
27	Soslan Dzhanayev	(Russia)	GK	13 March 1987 (aged 27)	KAMAZ	2008		41	0
29	Emmanuel Emenike	(Nigeria)	FW	10 May 1987 (aged 27)	Fenerbahçe	2011		51	21
39	Artyom Makarov	(Russia)	GK	17 November 1996 (aged 17)	Youth team	2014		0	0
46	Alexandr Yushin	(Russia)	MF	4 April 1995 (aged 19)	Youth team	2013		0	0
58	Sultan Jamilov	(Russia)	MF	18 July 1995 (aged 18)	Youth team	2013		0	0

=== Out on loan ===
Note: Flags indicate national team as defined under FIFA eligibility rules; some limited exceptions apply. Players may hold more than one non-FIFA nationality.

No.	Pos.	Nation	Player
2	DF	ARG	Juan Insaurralde (at PAOK)
5	DF	ARG	Nicolás Pareja (at Sevilla)
10	FW	RUS	Artem Dzyuba (at Rostov)
11	FW	BRA	Welliton (at Celta de Vigo)
16	MF	NED	Demy de Zeeuw (1t Anderlecht)
17	DF	CZE	Marek Suchý (at Basel)

No.	Pos.	Nation	Player
21	MF	SWE	Kim Källström (at Arsenal)
25	MF	RUS	Diniyar Bilyaletdinov (at Anzhi Makhachkala)
27	MF	RUS	Aleksandr Zotov (at Shinnik Yaroslavl)
28	FW	GHA	Majeed Waris (at Valenciennes)
49	MF	GEO	Jano Ananidze (at Rostov)
51	MF	RUS	Dmitri Kayumov (at Amkar Perm)

=== Left club during season ===
Note: Flags indicate national team as defined under FIFA eligibility rules; some limited exceptions apply. Players may hold more than one non-FIFA nationality.

No.	Pos.	Nation	Player
1	GK	RUS	Nikolai Zabolotny (to Ural Yekaterinburg)
8	MF	IRL	Aiden McGeady (to Everton)
9	FW	BRA	Ari (to Krasnodar)
20	FW	RUS	Aleksandr Marenich (to Avangard Kursk)
27	GK	RUS	Soslan Dzhanayev (to Rostov)

No.	Pos.	Nation	Player
29	FW	NGR	Emmanuel Emenike (to Fenerbahçe)
39	GK	RUS	Artyom Makarov
46	MF	RUS	Alexandr Yushin
58	MF	RUS	Sultan Jamilov (to Lokomotiv Moscow)

== Transfers ==
=== In ===
Date	Position	Nationality	Name	From	Fee	Ref.
Summer 2013	MF	(Russia)	Aleksandr Manyukov	Arsenal Tula	Undisclosed	
5 June 2013	MF	(Argentina)	Tino Costa	Valencia	Undisclosed	
18 June 2013	MF	(Russia)	Denis Glushakov	Lokomotiv Moscow	Undisclosed	
26 June 2013	MF	(Spain)	José Jurado	Schalke 04	Undisclosed	
26 July 2013	MF	(Armenia)	Aras Özbiliz	Kuban Krasnodar	Undisclosed	
10 August 2013	FW	(Paraguay)	Lucas Barrios	Guangzhou Evergrande	Undisclosed	
22 August 2013	DF	(Brazil)	João Carlos	Anzhi Makhachkala	Undisclosed	
30 August 2013	DF	(Germany)	Serdar Tasci	VfB Stuttgart	Undisclosed	
8 February 2014	MF	(Germany)	Patrick Ebert	Real Valladolid	Free	

=== Out ===
Date	Position	Nationality	Name	To	Fee	Ref.
12 August 2013	FW	(Nigeria)	Emmanuel Emenike	Fenerbahçe	Undisclosed	
19 August 2013	FW	(Brazil)	Ari	Krasnodar	Undisclosed	
11 January 2014	MF	(Republic of Ireland)	Aiden McGeady	Everton	Undisclosed	

=== Loans out ===
Date from	Position	Nationality	Name	To	Date to	Ref.
1 July 2013	FW	(Russia)	Artem Dzyuba	Rostov	30 June 2014	
3 July 2013	MF	(Georgia (country))	Jano Ananidze	Rostov	30 June 2014	
4 July 2013	DF	(Argentina)	Nicolás Pareja	Sevilla	30 June 2014	
5 July 2013	MF	(Netherlands)	Demy de Zeeuw	Anderlecht	30 June 2014	
8 July 2013	DF	(Russia)	Nikolai Fadeyev	Amkar Perm	31 December 2013	
8 July 2013	MF	(Russia)	Dmitri Kayumov	Amkar Perm	30 June 2014	
24 July 2013	MF	(Russia)	Aleksandr Zotov	Shinnik Yaroslavl	30 June 2014	
28 August 2013	FW	(Brazil)	Welliton	São Paulo	31 December 2013	
3 January 2014	FW	(Ghana)	Majeed Waris	Valenciennes	30 June 2014	
28 January 2014	DF	(Czech Republic)	Marek Suchý	Basel	30 June 2014	
30 January 2014	DF	(Argentina)	Juan Insaurralde	PAOK	30 June 2014	
31 January 2014	MF	(Sweden)	Kim Källström	Arsenal	30 June 2014	
31 January 2014	FW	(Brazil)	Welliton	Celta de Vigo	30 June 2014	
7 February 2014	MF	(Russia)	Diniyar Bilyaletdinov	Anzhi Makhachkala	30 June 2014	

=== Released ===
Date	Position	Nationality	Name	Joined	Date
30 June 2014	GK	(Ukraine)	Andriy Dykan	Krasnodar	
30 June 2014	DF	(Russia)	Anton Fedotov		
30 June 2014	DF	(Russia)	Soslan Gatagov	Ulisses	
30 June 2014	DF	(Russia)	Yaroslav Shmygov		
30 June 2014	MF	(Azerbaijan)	Rahim Sadykhov	Solyaris Moscow	
30 June 2014	MF	(Netherlands)	Demy de Zeeuw	NAC Breda	7 February 2015
30 June 2014	MF	(Russia)	Igor Konovalov	Kuban Krasnodar	
30 June 2014	MF	(Russia)	Andrei Svyatov	Tom Tomsk	
30 June 2014	FW	(Russia)	Vladislav Kormishin		

== Competitions ==
=== Russian Premier League ===
==== Results by round ====
Round	1	2	3	4	5	6	7	8	9	10	11	12	13	14	15	16	17	18	19	20	21	22	23	24	25	26	27	28	29	30
Ground	A	A	A	A	H	A	H	A	H	H	A	H	A	H	H	H	A	H	A	A	H	A	A	H	H	A	H	A	H	H
Result	W	W	W	D	D	L	W	W	W	W	L	D	W	W	L	W	L	W	W	L	D	L	D	L	W	L	L	L	W	W

Updated to match(es) played on 15 May 2014. Source: See Results
A = Away; H = Home; W = Win; D = Draw; L = Loss

==== Results ====
6 July 2013 1	Krylia Sovetov	1 – 2	Spartak Moscow	Samara
19:30 MSK (UTC+4)	Balyaikin (yellow card) 20'; Caballero 61'; Nemov (yellow card) 80'; Angbwa (yellow card) 82'	Report	Costa 18'; Movsisyan 21' (pen.); D.Kombarov (yellow card) 33'; Insaurralde (yellow card) 77'	Stadium: Metallurg Stadium; Attendance: 20,530; Referee: Sergei Ivanov

21 July 2013 2	Ural Sverdlovsk Oblast	0 – 2	Spartak Moscow	Yekaterinburg
16:00 MSK (UTC+4)	Vještica (yellow card) 73'; Shchanitsyn (yellow card) 89'	Report	Yakovlev (yellow card) 19'; McGeady 51'; Emenike 90'	Stadium: Central Stadium; Attendance: 26,000; Referee: Sergey Lapochkin

27 July 2013 3	Dynamo Moscow	1 – 4	Spartak Moscow	Khimki
13:30 MSK (UTC+4)	Granat (yellow card) 9'; Lomić (yellow card) 19'; Voronin (yellow card) 62' (goal) 80' (pen.); Fernández (yellow card) 72'; Wilkshire (yellow card) 90+2'	Report	Jurado 7', 42'; Yakovlev 12'; McGeady (yellow card) 28'; Emenike 30'; Bocchetti (yellow card) 44'	Stadium: Arena Khimki; Attendance: 16,714; Referee: Alexander Yegorov

4 August 2013 4	Kuban Krasnodar	2 – 2	Spartak Moscow	Krasnodar
20:30 MSK (UTC+4)	Kaboré (yellow card) 9'; Belenov (yellow card) 31'; Tlisov (yellow card) 40'; Baldé 67'; Xandão 70'	Report	Jurado (yellow card) 9'; Emenike 30'; Movsisyan 75'; Bocchetti (yellow card) 89'	Stadium: Kuban Stadium; Attendance: 30,527; Referee: Vitali Meshkov

18 August 2013 5	Spartak Moscow	0 – 0	Rubin Kazan	Moscow
15:45 MSK (UTC+4)		Report	Karadeniz (yellow card) 51'; Rondón (yellow card) 53'	Stadium: Lokomotiv Stadium; Attendance: 24,300; Referee: Aleksei Nikolaev
Note: Match played at the Lokomotiv Stadium in Moscow, due to renovation work at the Luzhniki Stadium in Moscow.

26 August 2013 6	Amkar Perm	2 – 1	Spartak Moscow	Perm
17:45 MSK (UTC+4)	Peev 17'; Sirakov (yellow card) 26'; Jakubko 67'; Belorukov (yellow card) 90+1'; Gol (yellow card) 90+3'	Report	Costa (yellow card) 45'; Yakovlev 49'; Insaurralde (yellow card) 20' (yellow-red card) 87'	Stadium: Zvezda Stadium; Attendance: 15,700; Referee: Vladislav Bezborodov

1 September 2013 7	Spartak Moscow	2 – 1	Tom Tomsk	Moscow
15:45 MSK (UTC+4)	Movsisyan 45+3'; João Carlos (yellow card) 67'; Yakovlev 76'; Costa (yellow card) 78'	Report	Rykov 7'; Saláta (yellow card) 40'	Stadium: Lokomotiv Stadium; Attendance: 9,150; Referee: Maksim Layushkin
Note: Match played at the Lokomotiv Stadium in Moscow, due to renovation work at the Luzhniki Stadium in Moscow.

14 September 2013 8	Volga Nizhny Novgorod	0 – 1	Spartak Moscow	Nizhny Novgorod
15:45 MSK (UTC+4)	Aldonin (yellow card) 42'; Rodić (yellow card) 78'	Report	Yakovlev (yellow card) 30'; Movsisyan 32'	Stadium: Lokomotiv Stadium; Attendance: 17,000; Referee: Sergey Lapochkin

22 September 2013 9	Spartak Moscow	3 – 0	CSKA Moscow	Moscow
MSK (UTC+4)	Özbiliz 39' (yellow card) 47'; Glushakov (yellow card) 45'; K.Kombarov 52'; Parshivlyuk 59'; Movsisyan (yellow card) 65'	Report	Ignashevich (yellow card) 46'; Nababkin (yellow card) 65'	Stadium: Lokomotiv Stadium; Attendance: 27,000; Referee: Aleksei Nikolaev
Note: Match played at the Lokomotiv Stadium] in Moscow, due to renovation work at the Luzhniki Stadium in Moscow.

25 September 2013 10	Spartak Moscow	3 – 2	Krasnodar	Moscow
18:15 MSK (UTC+4)	Jurado 4', 30' (yellow card) 90+5'; Movsisyan 27'; Suchý (yellow card) 76'	Report	Pereyra 16'; Isael 68'	Stadium: Lokomotiv Stadium; Attendance: 12,500; Referee: Sergey Kuznetsov
Note: Match played at the Lokomotiv Stadium] in Moscow, due to renovation work at the Luzhniki Stadium in Moscow.

28 September 2013 11	Zenit St.Petersburg	4 – 2	Spartak Moscow	Saint Petersburg
19:30 MSK (UTC+4)	Kerzhakov 20'; Hulk 68'; Shatov 81'; Danny 84'	Report	Källström 29'; Jurado (yellow card) 39'; Makeyev (yellow card) 54'; João Carlos (yellow card) 60'; Movsisyan 70'	Stadium: Petrovsky Stadium; Attendance: 19,877; Referee: Alexander Yegorov

6 October 2013 12	Spartak Moscow	0 – 0	Terek Grozny	Central Stadium
14:30 MSK (UTC+4)		Report	Adílson (yellow card) 20'; Temnikov (yellow card) 74'	Stadium: Yekaterinburg; Attendance: 10,500; Referee: Igor Nizovtsev
Note: Match played at the Central Stadium in Yekaterinburg, due to renovation work at the Luzhniki Stadium in Moscow.

20 October 2013 13	Anzhi Makhachkala	0 – 1	Spartak Moscow	Kaspiysk
13:30 MSK (UTC+4)	Traoré (yellow card) 29'; Burmistrov (yellow card) 71'; Abdulavov (yellow card) 90+2'; Grigalava (yellow card) 90+3'	Report	Movsisyan 27'; K.Kombarov (yellow card) 41'; Carioca (yellow card) 71'; Parshivlyuk (yellow card) 79'; Barrios (yellow card) 90+3'	Stadium: Anzhi Arena; Attendance: 12,200; Referee: Sergey Ivanov

26 October 2013 14	Spartak Moscow	2 – 0	Rostov	Moscow
19:30 MSK (UTC+4)	Movsisyan 15' (pen.) (yellow card) 33'; Glushakov (yellow card) 17'; D.Kombarov (yellow card) 37'; Özbiliz (yellow card) 45+2'; Costa 76'; Carioca (yellow card) 87'	Report	Kanga (yellow card) 45+2'	Stadium: Lokomotiv Stadium; Attendance: 15,000; Referee: Vitali Meshkov
Note: Match played at the Lokomotiv Stadium] in Moscow, due to renovation work at the Luzhniki Stadium in Moscow.

3 November 2013 15	Spartak Moscow	1 – 3	Lokomotiv Moscow	Moscow
18:00 MSK (UTC+4)	Movsisyan 27'; Jurado (yellow card) 80'; Costa (yellow card) 90+2'	Report	N'Doye 7', 77'; Samedov 17'	Stadium: Lokomotiv Stadium; Attendance: 0 Referee: Aleksei Nikolaev
Note: Match played at the Lokomotiv Stadium] in Moscow, due to renovation work at the Luzhniki Stadium in Moscow. Match played behind closed door as punishment from the RFU Control-Disciplinary Body due to the display of Nazi symbols by Spartak fans during Russian Cup game vs Shinnik on 30 October 2013.

10 November 2013 16	Spartak Moscow	4 – 2	Zenit St.Petersburg	Moscow
13:30 MSK (UTC+4)	Movsisyan (yellow card) 1' (goal) 33', 44', 48'; Costa (yellow card) 18'; McGeady (yellow card) 27'; Parshivlyuk (yellow card) 35'; Glushakov 83'	Report	Kerzhakov 6'; Hulk (penalty missed) 19' 64' (yellow card) 85'; Neto (yellow card) 79'; Anyukov (yellow card) 90+3'	Stadium: Lokomotiv Stadium; Attendance: 0 Referee: Aleksei Eskov
Note: Match played at the Lokomotiv Stadium] in Moscow, due to renovation work at the Luzhniki Stadium in Moscow. Match played behind closed door as punishment from the RFU Control-Disciplinary Body due to the display of Nazi symbols by Spartak fans during Russian Cup game vs Shinnik on 30 October 2013.

23 November 2013 17	CSKA Moscow	1 – 0	Spartak Moscow	Khimki
17:00 MSK (UTC+4)	Doumbia 8'; Wernbloom (yellow card) 26'	Report	D.Kombarov (yellow card) 39'; Movsisyan (yellow card) 47'; Carioca (yellow card) 58'; João Carlos (yellow card) 81'	Stadium: Arena Khimki; Attendance: 14,800; Referee: Alexander Yegorov

1 December 2013 18	Spartak Moscow	6 – 1	Volga Nizhny Novgorod	Moscow
18:30 MSK (UTC+4)	Jurado 3', 33'; D.Kombarov (yellow card) 28'; Barrios 45+1'; Özbiliz 50', 77'; Suchý (yellow card) 63'; Kolodin 84' (o.g.)	Report	Ropotan (yellow card) 11'; Bulykin (penalty missed) 64'; Dvorneković 74'; Kolodin (yellow card) 77'	Stadium: Lokomotiv Stadium; Attendance: 10,875; Referee: Vladislav Bezborodov
Note: Match played at the Lokomotiv Stadium] in Moscow, due to renovation work at the Luzhniki Stadium in Moscow.

8 December 2013 19	Rostov	0 – 1	Spartak Moscow	Rostov-on-Don
13:30 MSK (UTC+4)	Kanga (yellow card) 31'; Yoo (yellow card) 40'	Report	Costa (yellow card) 31'; Yakovlev (yellow card) 74'; Waris 88'	Stadium: Olimp – 2 Attendance: 15,150; Referee: Sergey Lapochkin

8 March 2014 20	Terek Grozny	1 – 0	Spartak Moscow	Grozny
19:00 MSK (UTC+4)	Maurício 1'; Utsiyev (yellow card) 54'; Ivanov (yellow card) 79'; Grozav (yellow card) 80'	Report	Jurado (yellow card) 54'; Costa (yellow card) 59'	Stadium: Akhmat-Arena; Attendance: 19,700; Referee: Vitali Meshkov

17 March 2014 21	Spartak Moscow	2 – 2	Anzhi Makhachkala	Moscow
19:00 MSK (UTC+4)	Costa 20'; Jurado 23'; Movsisyan (yellow card) 59'; Makeyev (yellow card) 68'; Carioca (yellow card) 74'	Report	Smolov (yellow card) 26'; Epureanu (yellow card) 39' (goal) 52'; Mkrtchyan (yellow card) 85'; Serderov 90+5'	Stadium: Lokomotiv Stadium; Attendance: 12,200; Referee: Sergey Lapochkin

22 March 2013 22	Krasnodar	4 – 0	Spartak Moscow	Krasnodar
19:00 MSK (UTC+4)	Ari 4', 9', 50'; Wánderson 31'; Joãozinho (yellow card) 80'	Report	João Carlos (yellow card) 9'; Makeyev (yellow card) 53'; Costa (yellow card) 79'	Stadium: Kuban Stadium; Attendance: 23,400; Referee: Vladislav Bezborodov

30 March 2013 23	Lokomotiv Moscow	0 – 0	Spartak Moscow	Moscow
13:30 MSK (UTC+3)	Denisov (yellow card) 39'; Shishkin (yellow card) 73'	Report	Bryzgalov (yellow card) 23'; Costa (yellow card) 45+1'; Carioca (yellow card) 51'; D.Kombarov (yellow card) 53'	Stadium: Lokomotiv Stadium; Attendance: 28,000; Referee: Mikhail Vilkov

4 April 2014 24	Spartak Moscow	0 – 1	Ural Sverdlovsk Oblast	Moscow
20:30 MSK (UTC+4)	Parshivlyuk (yellow card) 83'	Report	Khozin 20'; Ottesen (yellow card) 65'; Lungu (yellow card) 77'	Stadium: Lokomotiv Stadium; Attendance: 9,850; Referee: Vitali Meshkov
Note: Match played at the Lokomotiv Stadium] in Moscow, due to renovation work at the Luzhniki Stadium in Moscow.

11 April 2014 25	Spartak Moscow	1 – 0	Krylia Sovetov	Moscow
19:30 MSK (UTC+4)	Movsisyan 15'; Makeyev (yellow card) 57'; Glushakov (yellow card) 62'; Carioca (yellow card) 82'	Report	Drahun (yellow card) 69'; Nemov (yellow card) 76'	Stadium: Lokomotiv Stadium; Attendance: 9,710; Referee: Sergei Ivanov
Note: Match played at the Lokomotiv Stadium] in Moscow, due to renovation work at the Luzhniki Stadium in Moscow.

20 April 2014 26	Rubin Kazan	2 – 1	Spartak Moscow	Kazan
13:30 MSK (UTC+4)	Dević 67'; Prudnikov 90+2'	Report	Movsisyan 56'; Carioca (yellow card) 90+4'	Stadium: Central Stadium; Attendance: 13,118; Referee: Mikhail Vilkov

28 April 2014 27	Spartak Moscow	0 – 2	Kuban Krasnodar	Moscow
20:30 MSK (UTC+4)	Glushakov (yellow card) 72'	Report	Armaș (yellow card) 65'; Popov 67', 86' (yellow card) 68'	Stadium: Lokomotiv Stadium; Attendance: 8,585; Referee: Aleksei Nikolaev
Note: Match played at the Lokomotiv Stadium] in Moscow, due to renovation work at the Luzhniki Stadium in Moscow.

3 May 2014 28	Tom Tomsk	2 – 1	Spartak Moscow	Tomsk
14:00 MSK (UTC+4)	Panchenko 53' (pen.) (yellow card) 57'; Nyakhaychyk (red card) 57'; Portnyagin 61'	Report	Yakovlev (yellow card) 26'; Bocchetti (yellow card) 53'; Makeyev (yellow card) 82'; Movsisyan 85'; Dykan (red card) 90'	Stadium: Trud Stadium; Attendance: 10,000; Referee: Vladislav Bezborodov

10 May 2014 29	Spartak Moscow	1 – 0	Amkar Perm	Moscow
17:45 MSK (UTC+4)	Movsisyan 31'; Glushakov (yellow card) 54'; Makeyev (yellow card) 88'	Report	Ogude (yellow card) 44'; Wawrzyniak (yellow card) 55' (yellow-red card) 90+1'	Stadium: Lokomotiv Stadium; Attendance: 5,896; Referee: Kirill Levnikov
Note: Match played at the Lokomotiv Stadium] in Moscow, due to renovation work at the Luzhniki Stadium in Moscow.

15 May 2014 30	Spartak Moscow	3 – 2	Dynamo Moscow	Moscow
18:30 MSK (UTC+4)	Parshivlyuk (yellow card) 3' (goal) 70'; Jurado 56'; Carioca (yellow card) 88'; D.Kombarov 90+8'	Report	Wilkshire (yellow card) 21'; Florescu 38'; Ionov 47'; Dyadyun (yellow card) 66'; Noboa (yellow card) 73'; Douglas (yellow card) 77'; Gabulov (yellow card) 79'; Fernández (yellow card) 90+6'	Stadium: Lokomotiv Stadium; Attendance: 12,180; Referee: Igor Fedotov
Note: Match played at the Lokomotiv Stadium] in Moscow, due to renovation work at the Luzhniki Stadium in Moscow.

==== Table ====
Pos	Team	Pld	W	D	L	GF	GA	GD	Pts	Qualification or relegation
4	Dynamo Moscow	30	15	7	8	54	37	+17	52	Qualification for the Europa League third qualifying round
5	Krasnodar	30	15	5	10	46	39	+7	50 (Note: Krasnodar ahead of Spartak Moscow on head-to-head points; Krasnodar–Spartak Moscow 4–0, Spartak Moscow–Krasnodar 3–2.)	Qualification for the Europa League second qualifying round
6	Spartak Moscow	30	15	5	10	46	36	+10	50	
7	Rostov	30	10	9	11	40	40	0	39	Qualification for the Europa League play-off round (Note: Rostov won the 2013–14 Russian Cup, therefore qualifying for the play-off round of the 2014–15 UEFA Europa League. However, it did not pass the Russian Football Union European licensing and thus its spot was given to Spartak. However, that RFU decision was then overturned by the CAS and Rostov was returned to the Europa League.)
8	Kuban Krasnodar	30	10	8	12	40	42	−2	38	

Source: Russian Premier League
Rules for classification: 1) points; 2) number of wins; 3) head-to-head points; 4) number of head-to-head wins; 5) head-to-head goal difference; 6) number of head-to-head goals scored; 7) number of head-to-head away goals scored; 8) goal difference; 9) number of goals scored; 10) number of away goals scored; 11) position in the 2012–13 season (only used until all the regularly scheduled games have been played); 11) extra play-off game or tournament between the teams in question.

=== Russian Cup ===
30 October 2013 Fifth Round	Shinnik Yaroslavl	0 – 1	Spartak Moscow	Yaroslavl
18:30 MSK (UTC+4)	Karytska (yellow card) 54'	Report	Özbiliz (yellow card) 8'; K.Kombarov (yellow card) 41'; D. Kombarov 72' (pen.); Carioca (yellow card) 84'; Rebrov (yellow card) 90+'	Stadium: Shinnik Stadium; Attendance: 17,500; Referee: Sergey Kostevich

12 March 2014 Round of 16	Spartak Moscow	0 – 1 (a.e.t.)	Tosno	Moscow
19:30 MSK (UTC+4)		Report	Lukanchenkov (yellow card) 69'; Filatov 113'	Stadium: Lokomotiv stadium Attendance: 10,200; Referee: Alexander Yegorov

=== UEFA Europa League ===
==== Play-off round ====
22 August 2013 1st leg	St. Gallen (Switzerland)	1 – 1	(Russia) Spartak Moscow	St. Gallen, Switzerland
21:00 MSK (UTC+4)	Janjatović (yellow card) 20'; Mathys 47'; Mutsch (yellow card) 48'; Nushi (yellow card) 59'	Report	Timofeyev (yellow card) 13'; Movsisyan 37'; Barrios (yellow card) 73'; Carioca (yellow card) 78'	Stadium: AFG Arena; Attendance: 18,000; Referee: Ovidiu Hațegan (Romania)

29 August 2013 2nd leg	Spartak Moscow (Russia)	2 – 4 (3 – 5 agg.)	(Switzerland) St. Gallen	Khimki, Russia
19:00 MSK (UTC+4)	Özbiliz 1' (yellow card) 70'; Suchý (yellow card) 56'; Movsisyan 83'	Report	Karanović 17', 32'; Rodríguez 36'; Mutsch (yellow card) 41'; Janjatović 88'	Stadium: Arena Khimki; Attendance: 8,134; Referee: Danny Makkelie (Netherlands)

== Squad statistics ==
As of match played 15 May 2014

=== Appearances and goals ===
No.	Pos	Nat	Player	Total		Premier League		Russian Cup		UEFA Europa League	
No.	Pos	Nat	Player	Apps	Goals	Apps	Goals	Apps	Goals	Apps	Goals
3	DF	(Russia) RUS	Sergei Bryzgalov	4	0	4	0	0	0	0	0
4	DF	(Russia) RUS	Sergei Parshivlyuk	28	2	25+1	2	1	0	1	0
5	MF	(Argentina) ARG	Tino Costa	27	3	24	3	1	0	2	0
6	MF	(Brazil) BRA	Rafael Carioca	30	0	21+5	0	2	0	2	0
7	DF	(Russia) RUS	Kirill Kombarov	8	0	4+2	0	1	0	1	0
8	MF	(Russia) RUS	Denis Glushakov	30	1	27	1	1+1	0	0+1	0
9	FW	(Paraguay) PAR	Lucas Barrios	19	1	4+11	1	1+1	0	1+1	0
10	FW	(Armenia) ARM	Yura Movsisyan	30	17	25+2	16	1	0	1+1	1
11	MF	(Armenia) ARM	Aras Özbiliz	30	4	18+9	3	2	0	1	1
12	GK	(Russia) RUS	Anton Mitryushkin	3	0	2	0	1	0	0	0
14	FW	(Russia) RUS	Pavel Yakovlev	25	3	10+12	3	1	0	1+1	0
15	MF	(Brazil) BRA	Rômulo	10	0	3+6	0	1	0	0	0
19	MF	(Spain) ESP	José Jurado	32	8	29	8	0+2	0	1	0
20	MF	(Germany) GER	Patrick Ebert	7	0	3+3	0	1	0	0	0
23	DF	(Russia) RUS	Dmitri Kombarov	31	3	28	2	2	1	1	0
30	GK	(Russia) RUS	Sergei Pesyakov	17	0	15	0	0	0	2	0
31	GK	(Ukraine) UKR	Andriy Dykan	6	0	6	0	0	0	0	0
32	GK	(Russia) RUS	Artyom Rebrov	9	0	7+1	0	1	0	0	0
33	DF	(Italy) ITA	Salvatore Bocchetti	12	0	10+1	0	1	0	0	0
34	DF	(Russia) RUS	Yevgeni Makeyev	28	0	24	0	1+1	0	2	0
35	DF	(Germany) GER	Serdar Tasci	4	0	4	0	0	0	0	0
40	MF	(Russia) RUS	Artyom Timofeyev	1	0	0	0	0	0	1	0
41	FW	(Russia) RUS	Vladimir Obukhov	1	0	0+1	0	0	0	0	0
55	DF	(Brazil) BRA	João Carlos	16	0	15	0	0+1	0	0	0
57	FW	(Russia) RUS	Vyacheslav Krotov	1	0	0	0	0	0	1	0
69	FW	(Russia) RUS	Denis Davydov	2	0	0+2	0	0	0	0	0
Players away from the club on loan:
2	DF	(Argentina) ARG	Juan Insaurralde	9	0	4+3	0	1	0	1	0
17	DF	(Czech Republic) CZE	Marek Suchý	9	0	1+5	0	1	0	1+1	0
21	MF	(Sweden) SWE	Kim Källström	12	1	6+4	1	1	0	0+1	0
25	MF	(Russia) RUS	Diniyar Bilyaletdinov	3	0	0+2	0	0	0	1	0
28	FW	(Ghana) GHA	Majeed Waris	5	1	0+4	1	0	0	1	0
Players who appeared for Spartak Moscow that left during the season:
8	MF	(Republic of Ireland) IRL	Aiden McGeady	13	1	9+4	1	0	0	0	0
29	FW	(Nigeria) NGR	Emmanuel Emenike	4	3	2+2	3	0	0	0	0

=== Goal scorers ===
Place	Position	Nation	Number	Name	Premier League	Russian Cup	UEFA Europa League	Total
1	FW	(Armenia)	10	Yura Movsisyan	16	0	2	18
2	MF	(Spain)	19	José Jurado	8	0	0	8
3	MF	(Armenia)	11	Aras Özbiliz	3	0	1	4
4	MF	(Argentina)	5	Tino Costa	3	0	0	3
4	FW	(Nigeria)	29	Emmanuel Emenike	3	0	0	3
4	FW	(Russia)	14	Pavel Yakovlev	3	0	0	3
7	DF	(Russia)	4	Sergei Parshivlyuk	2	0	0	2
7	DF	(Russia)	23	Dmitri Kombarov	1	1	0	2
9	MF	(Republic of Ireland)	8	Aiden McGeady	1	0	0	1
9	DF	(Russia)	7	Kirill Kombarov	1	0	0	1
9	MF	(Sweden)	21	Kim Källström	1	0	0	1
9	MF	(Russia)	8	Denis Glushakov	1	0	0	1
9	FW	(Paraguay)	9	Lucas Barrios	1	0	0	1
9	FW	(Ghana)	28	Majeed Waris	1	0	0	1
9				Own goal	1	0	0	1
				TOTALS	46	1	3	50

=== Clean sheets ===
Place	Position	Nation	Number	Name	Premier League	Russian Cup	UEFA Europa League	Total
1	GK	(Russia)	30	Sergei Pesyakov	7	0	0	7
2	GK	(Russia)	32	Artyom Rebrov	2	1	0	3
3	GK	(Ukraine)	31	Andriy Dykan	2	0	0	2
				TOTALS	11	1	0	12

=== Disciplinary record ===
Number	Nation	Position	Name	Premier League		Russian Cup		UEFA Europa League		Total	
Number	Nation	Position	Name	Yellow card	Red card	Yellow card	Red card	Yellow card	Red card	Yellow card	Red card
3	(Russia)	DF	Sergei Bryzgalov	1	0	0	0	0	0	1	0
4	(Russia)	DF	Sergei Parshivlyuk	4	0	0	0	0	0	4	0
5	(Argentina)	MF	Tino Costa	8	0	0	0	0	0	8	0
6	(Brazil)	MF	Rafael Carioca	8	0	1	0	1	0	9	0
7	(Russia)	DF	Kirill Kombarov	1	0	1	0	0	0	2	0
8	(Russia)	MF	Denis Glushakov	5	0	0	0	0	0	5	0
9	(Paraguay)	FW	Lucas Barrios	0	0	0	0	1	0	1	0
10	(Armenia)	FW	Yura Movsisyan	5	0	0	0	0	0	5	0
11	(Armenia)	MF	Aras Özbiliz	3	0	1	0	1	0	5	0
14	(Russia)	FW	Pavel Yakovlev	4	0	0	0	0	0	4	0
19	(Spain)	MF	José Jurado	5	0	0	0	0	0	5	0
23	(Russia)	DF	Dmitri Kombarov	5	0	0	0	0	0	5	0
31	(Ukraine)	GK	Andriy Dykan	0	1	0	0	0	0	0	1
32	(Russia)	GK	Artyom Rebrov	0	0	1	0	0	0	1	0
33	(Italy)	DF	Salvatore Bocchetti	3	0	0	0	0	0	3	0
34	(Russia)	DF	Yevgeni Makeyev	6	0	0	0	0	0	6	0
40	(Russia)	MF	Artyom Timofeyev	0	0	0	0	1	0	1	0
55	(Brazil)	DF	João Carlos	4	0	0	0	0	0	4	0
Players away on loan:
2	(Argentina)	MF	Juan Insaurralde	3	1	0	0	0	0	3	1
17	(Czech Republic)	DF	Marek Suchý	2	0	0	0	1	0	3	0
Players who left Spartak Moscow season during the season:
8	(Republic of Ireland)	MF	Aiden McGeady	2	0	0	0	0	0	2	0
			TOTALS	69	2	4	0	5	0	78	2
