= 2014–15 FC Spartak Moscow season =

FC Spartak Moscow
2014–15 season
- Chairman: Leonid Fedun
- Manager: Murat Yakin
- Stadium: Otkrytie Arena
- Russian Premier League: 6th
- Russian Cup: Last 16 vs Rubin Kazan
- Top goalscorer: League: Quincy Promes (13); All: Quincy Promes (13)
- Highest home attendance: 39,074 vs Lokomotiv Moscow; 26 October 2014
- Lowest home attendance: 10,000 vs Rostov; 4 December 2014
- Average home league attendance: 24,706; 30 May 2015
Home colours	Away colours

The 2014–15 Spartak Moscow season was the 23rd successive season that Spartak played in the Russian Premier League, the highest tier of association football in Russia. Spartak finished the season in sixth position, missing out on European Competition for a second year in succession, and were knocked out of the Russian Cup by Rubin Kazan in the Round of 16.

== Season events ==
On 26 October 2014, Moscow Time changed permanently from UTC+4 to UTC+3.

== Squad ==
As of match played 30 May 2015

No.	Name	Nationality	Position	Date of birth (age)	Signed from	Signed in	Contract ends	Apps.	Goals
Goalkeepers
1	Anton Mitryushkin	(Russia)	GK	8 February 1996 (aged 19)	Youth Team	2012		4	0
30	Sergei Pesyakov	(Russia)	GK	28 May 1988 (aged 27)	Shinnik Yaroslavl	2009		36	0
32	Artyom Rebrov	(Russia)	GK	4 March 1984 (aged 31)	Shinnik Yaroslavl	2011		54	0
47	Mikhail Filippov	(Russia)	GK	10 June 1992 (aged 22)	Znamya Truda Orekhovo-Zuyevo	2014		0	0
56	Vadim Averkiyev	(Russia)	GK	1 June 1997 (aged 17)	Youth Team	2013		0	0
81	Yuriy Shcherbakov	(Russia)	GK	11 April 1996 (aged 19)	Youth Team	2013		0	0
85	Vladislav Teryoshkin	(Russia)	GK	16 July 1995 (aged 19)	Youth Team	2012		0	0
91	Aleksandr Maksimenko	(Russia)	GK	23 February 1998 (aged 17)	Youth Team	2014		0	0
98	Ilya Sukhoruchenko	(Russia)	GK	23 February 1998 (aged 17)	Youth Team	2013		0	0
Defenders
2	Juan Insaurralde	(Argentina)	DF	3 October 1984 (aged 30)	Boca Juniors	2012		49	2
3	Sergei Bryzgalov	(Russia)	DF	15 November 1992 (aged 22)	Saturn Ramenskoye	2011		46	1
4	Sergei Parshivlyuk	(Russia)	DF	18 March 1989 (aged 26)	Youth Team	2007		153	3
23	Dmitri Kombarov	(Russia)	DF	22 January 1987 (aged 28)	Dynamo Moscow	2010		164	23
26	Anton Khodyrev	(Russia)	DF	26 January 1992 (aged 23)	Youth Team	2009		4	0
34	Yevgeni Makeyev	(Russia)	DF	24 July 1989 (aged 25)	Youth Team	2008		184	4
35	Serdar Tasci	(Germany)	DF	24 April 1987 (aged 28)	VfB Stuttgart	2013		26	1
38	Konstantin Shcherbakov	(Russia)	DF	20 March 1997 (aged 18)	Youth team	2013		0	0
44	Nikolai Fadeyev	(Russia)	DF	9 May 1993 (aged 22)	Youth Team	2010		1	0
45	Aleksandr Putsko	(Russia)	DF	24 February 1993 (aged 22)	Youth Team	2010		1	0
46	Artyom Mamin	(Russia)	DF	25 July 1997 (aged 17)	Youth team	2014		0	0
48	Aleksandr Stepanov	(Russia)	DF	10 January 1994 (aged 21)	Youth team	2011		0	0
54	Yegor Yevteyev	(Russia)	DF	1 April 1996 (aged 19)	Youth team	2012		0	0
55	João Carlos	(Brazil)	DF	1 January 1982 (aged 33)	Anzhi Makhachkala	2013		32	1
62	Aydar Lisinkov	(Russia)	DF	2 January 1994 (aged 21)	Youth team	2012		0	0
64	Denis Kutin	(Russia)	DF	5 October 1993 (aged 21)	Youth Team	2010		2	0
65	Oleg Krasilnichenko	(Russia)	DF	21 January 1997 (aged 18)	Youth team	2014		0	0
68	Aleksei Ivanushkin	(Russia)	DF	20 November 1996 (aged 18)	Youth team	2013		0	0
74	Valentin Vinnichenko	(Russia)	DF	21 April 1995 (aged 20)	Youth team	2012		0	0
80	Ivan Khomukha	(Russia)	DF	14 July 1994 (aged 20)	Youth Team	2010		0	0
88	Ilya Kutepov	(Russia)	DF	29 July 1993 (aged 21)	Akademiya Tolyatti	2012		2	0
93	Artyom Sokol	(Russia)	DF	11 June 1997 (aged 17)	Youth team	2014		0	0
94	Andrei Shigorev	(Russia)	DF	25 September 1997 (aged 17)	Youth team	2014		0	0
96	Aleksandr Likhachyov	(Russia)	DF	22 July 1996 (aged 18)	Youth team	2012		0	0
Midfielders
7	Jano Ananidze	(Georgia (country))	MF	10 October 1992 (aged 22)	Youth Team	2009		91	11
8	Denis Glushakov	(Russia)	MF	27 January 1987 (aged 28)	Lokomotiv Moscow	2013		58	3
11	Aras Özbiliz	(Armenia)	MF	9 March 1990 (aged 25)	Kuban Krasnodar	2013		31	4
13	Dmitri Kudryashov	(Russia)	MF	13 May 1983 (aged 32)	Luch-Energiya Vladivostok)	2014		29	5
15	Rômulo	(Brazil)	MF	19 September 1990 (aged 24)	Vasco da Gama	2012		38	3
19	José Jurado	(Spain)	MF	29 June 1986 (aged 28)	Schalke 04	2013		76	14
20	Patrick Ebert	(Germany)	MF	17 March 1987 (aged 28)	Real Valladolid	2014		25	0
21	Kim Källström	(Sweden)	MF	24 August 1982 (aged 32)	Lyon	2012		67	5
24	Quincy Promes	(Netherlands)	MF	4 January 1992 (aged 23)	Twente	2014		29	13
37	Georgi Melkadze	(Russia)	MF	4 April 1997 (aged 18)	Youth team	2014		2	0
40	Artyom Timofeyev	(Russia)	MF	12 January 1994 (aged 21)	Your team	2012		4	0
42	Yegor Sidoruk	(Russia)	MF	30 March 1997 (aged 18)	Youth team	2014		0	0
50	Alexandr Manyukov	(Russia)	MF	27 January 1993 (aged 22)	Youth team	2013		0	0
51	Dmitri Kayumov	(Russia)	MF	11 May 1992 (aged 23)	Youth Team	2009		1	0
52	Igor Leontyev	(Russia)	MF	18 March 1994 (aged 21)	Your team	2011		0	0
53	Artyom Samsonov	(Russia)	MF	5 January 1994 (aged 21)	Your team	2011		1	0
58	Daniil Gorovykh	(Russia)	MF	30 January 1997 (aged 18)	Youth team	2014		0	0
59	Nazar Gordeochuk	(Russia)	MF	11 April 1997 (aged 18)	Youth team	2014		0	0
60	Konstantin Savichev	(Russia)	MF	6 March 1994 (aged 21)	Your team	2011		0	0
61	Vladimir Zubarev	(Russia)	MF	5 January 1993 (aged 22)	Youth team	2010		0	0
63	Shamsiddin Shanbiyev	(Russia)	MF	18 February 1997 (aged 18)	Youth team	2014		0	0
66	Maxim Yermakov	(Russia)	MF	21 April 1995 (aged 20)	Youth team	2012		0	0
73	Ayaz Guliyev	(Russia)	MF	27 November 1996 (aged 18)	Youth team	2012		0	0
76	Pavel Globa	(Russia)	MF	31 May 1995 (aged 19)	Youth team	2012		0	0
79	Vladislav Masternoy	(Russia)	MF	17 November 1995 (aged 19)	Youth team	2012		0	0
83	Vladislav Panteleyev	(Russia)	MF	15 August 1996 (aged 18)	Youth team	2012		0	0
86	Danila Buranov	(Russia)	MF	11 February 1996 (aged 19)	Youth team	2012		0	0
87	Aleksandr Zuyev	(Russia)	MF	26 June 1996 (aged 18)	Youth team	2013		3	0
89	Vladlen Babayev	(Russia)	MF	12 October 1996 (aged 18)	Youth team	2012		0	0
97	Danil Poluboyarinov	(Russia)	MF	4 February 1997 (aged 18)	Youth team	2014		0	0
Forwards
10	Yura Movsisyan	(Armenia)	FW	2 August 1987 (aged 27)	Krasnodar	2012		55	23
36	Dmitri Malikov	(Russia)	FW	14 February 1997 (aged 18)	Youth team	2014		0	0
39	Ippei Shinozuka	(Japan)	FW	20 March 1995 (aged 20)	Youth team	2012		0	0
41	Vladimir Obukhov	(Russia)	FW	8 February 1992 (aged 23)	Youth Team	2008		5	0
57	Vyacheslav Krotov	(Russia)	FW	1 January 1991 (aged 24)	Volgar Astrakhan	2012		12	3
67	Artyom Fedchuk	(Russia)	FW	20 December 1994 (aged 20)	Youth team	2011		0	0
69	Denis Davydov	(Russia)	FW	22 March 1995 (aged 20)	Youth team	2012		22	0
70	Aleksandr Kozlov	(Russia)	FW	19 March 1993 (aged 22)	Youth team	2009		27	1
71	Maximiliano Artemio Lyalyushkin	(Russia)	FW	6 February 1997 (aged 18)	Youth team	2014		0	0
78	Zelimkhan Bakayev	(Russia)	FW	1 July 1996 (aged 18)	Youth team	2013		0	0
Away on loan
5	Tino Costa	(Argentina)	MF	9 January 1985 (aged 30)	Valencia	2013		35	3
6	Rafael Carioca	(Brazil)	MF	18 June 1989 (aged 25)	Grêmio	2009	2013	139	2
9	Roman Shirokov	(Russia)	MF	6 July 1981 (aged 33)	Zenit St.Petersburg	2014		6	1
14	Pavel Yakovlev	(Russia)	FW	7 April 1991 (aged 24)	Youth Team	2008		92	12
18	Lucas Barrios	(Paraguay)	FW	13 November 1984 (aged 30)	Guangzhou Evergrande	2013		20	2
22	Artem Dzyuba	(Russia)	FW	22 August 1988 (aged 26)	Youth Team	2006		158	35
25	Diniyar Bilyaletdinov	(Russia)	MF	27 February 1985 (aged 30)	Everton	2012		30	4
27	Aleksandr Zotov	(Russia)	MF	27 August 1990 (aged 24)	Youth Team	2008		17	0
33	Salvatore Bocchetti	(Italy)	DF	30 November 1986 (aged 28)	Rubin Kazan	2013		27	0
	Kirill Kombarov	(Russia)	DF	22 January 1987 (aged 28)	Dynamo Moscow	2010		82	3
Players that left Spartak Moscow during the season
28	Majeed Waris	(Ghana)	FW	19 September 1991 (aged 23)	BK Häcken	2013		16	1
43	Yuri Shleyev	(Russia)	GK	26 June 1995 (aged 19)	Mashuk-KMV Pyatigorsk	2013		0	0
71	Said-Ali Akhmayev	(Russia)	FW	30 May 1996 (aged 19)	Youth team	2013		0	0
75	Aleksei Grechkin	(Russia)	DF	6 February 1996 (aged 19)	Youth team	2012		0	0
82	Yevgeni Yezhov	(Russia)	DF	11 February 1995 (aged 20)	Youth team	2012		0	0
84	Alexandr Yuryev	(Russia)	FW	31 October 1996 (aged 18)	Youth team	2013		0	0

=== Out on loan ===
Note: Flags indicate national team as defined under FIFA eligibility rules; some limited exceptions apply. Players may hold more than one non-FIFA nationality.

No.	Pos.	Nation	Player
5	MF	ARG	Tino Costa (at Genoa)
6	MF	BRA	Rafael Carioca (at Atlético Mineiro)
9	MF	RUS	Roman Shirokov (at Krasnodar)
14	FW	RUS	Pavel Yakovlev (at Mordovia Saransk)
18	FW	PAR	Lucas Barrios (at Montpellier)

No.	Pos.	Nation	Player
22	FW	RUS	Artem Dzyuba (at Rostov)
25	MF	RUS	Diniyar Bilyaletdinov (at Torpedo Moscow)
27	MF	RUS	Aleksandr Zotov (at Arsenal Tula)
33	DF	ITA	Salvatore Bocchetti (at Milan)
—	DF	RUS	Kirill Kombarov (at Torpedo Moscow)

=== Left club during season ===
Note: Flags indicate national team as defined under FIFA eligibility rules; some limited exceptions apply. Players may hold more than one non-FIFA nationality.

No.	Pos.	Nation	Player
28	FW	GHA	Majeed Waris (to Trabzonspor)
43	GK	RUS	Yuri Shleyev (to Mashuk-KMV Pyatigorsk)
71	FW	RUS	Said-Ali Akhmayev (to Rostov)

No.	Pos.	Nation	Player
75	DF	RUS	Aleksei Grechkin (to Rostov)
82	DF	RUS	Yevgeni Yezhov (to Arsenal Tula)
84	FW	RUS	Alexandr Yuryev (to Rostov)

== Transfers ==
=== In ===
Date	Position	Nationality	Name	From	Fee	Ref.
30 June 2014	MF	(Russia)	Dmitri Kudryashov	Luch-Energiya Vladivostok	Undisclosed	
18 July 2014	MF	(Russia)	Roman Shirokov	Zenit St.Petersburg	Undisclosed	
8 August 2014	MF	(Netherlands)	Quincy Promes	Twente	Undisclosed	

=== Out ===
Date	Position	Nationality	Name	To	Fee	Ref.
23 May 2014	DF	(Czech Republic)	Marek Suchý	Basel	Undisclosed	
16 June 2014	GK	(Ukraine)	Andriy Dykan	Krasnodar	Undisclosed	
23 June 2014	DF	(Argentina)	Nicolás Pareja	Sevilla	Undisclosed	
20 August 2014	FW	(Brazil)	Welliton	Mersin İdman Yurdu	Undisclosed	
2 September 2014	FW	(Ghana)	Majeed Waris	Trabzonspor	Undisclosed	

=== Loans out ===
Date from	Position	Nationality	Name	To	Date to	Ref.
18 June 2014	MF	(Russia)	Aleksandr Zotov	Arsenal Tula	30 June 2015	
8 August 2014	MF	(Brazil)	Rafael Carioca	Atlético Mineiro	30 June 2015	
12 August 2014	FW	(Paraguay)	Lucas Barrios	Montpellier	30 June 2015	
27 August 2014	DF	(Russia)	Kirill Kombarov	Torpedo Moscow	30 June 2015	
3 September 2014	MF	(Russia)	Diniyar Bilyaletdinov	Torpedo Moscow	30 June 2015	
22 December 2014	MF	(Argentina)	Tino Costa	Genoa	30 June 2015	
13 January 2015	MF	(Russia)	Roman Shirokov	Krasnodar	30 June 2015	
28 January 2015	DF	(Italy)	Salvatore Bocchetti	Milan	30 June 2015	
4 February 2015	FW	(Russia)	Pavel Yakovlev	Mordovia Saransk	30 June 2015	
27 February 2015	FW	(Russia)	Artem Dzyuba	Rostov	30 June 2015	

=== Released ===
Date	Position	Nationality	Name	Joined	Date
31 December 2014	GK	(Russia)	Yuri Shleyev	Mashuk-KMV Pyatigorsk	
31 December 2014	DF	(Russia)	Aleksei Grechkin	Rostov	
31 December 2014	DF	(Russia)	Yevgeni Yezhov	Arsenal Tula	
31 December 2014	FW	(Russia)	Said-Ali Akhmayev	Rostov	
31 December 2014	FW	(Russia)	Aleksandr Yuryev	Rostov	
30 June 2015	DF	(Brazil)	João Carlos	Vasco da Gama	
30 June 2015	DF	(Russia)	Aleksei Ivanushkin	Kuban Krasnodar	
30 June 2015	DF	(Russia)	Yegor Yevteyev		
30 June 2015	MF	(Germany)	Patrick Ebert	Rayo Vallecano	25 July 2015
30 June 2015	MF	(Russia)	Danila Buranov	Armavir	
30 June 2015	MF	(Russia)	Pavel Globa		
30 June 2015	MF	(Russia)	Alexandr Manyukov	Avangard Kursk	
30 June 2015	MF	(Russia)	Vladislav Masternoy	Avangard Kursk	
30 June 2015	MF	(Russia)	Yegor Sidoruk	Neftekhimik Nizhnekamsk	
30 June 2015	MF	(Sweden)	Kim Källström	Grasshoppers	5 June 2015
30 June 2015	FW	(Russia)	Artem Dzyuba	Zenit St.Petersburg	1 July 2015

== Competitions ==
=== Russian Premier League ===
==== Results by round ====
Round	1	2	3	4	5	6	7	8	9	10	11	12	13	14	15	16	17	18	19	20	21	22	23	24	25	26	27	28	29	30
Ground	A	A	A	A	A	A	H	H	A	A	H	A	H	H	A	H	H	H	H	A	H	A	A	A	H	H	A	H	H	H
Result	W	W	L	W	W	L	W	D	D	L	D	D	W	W	L	D	W	L	W	W	D	L	L	W	W	D	L	L	L	D
Position	3	2	4	2	2	6	2	5	7	7	8	9	8	5	6	6	6	6	7	6	6	7	7	6	6	6	6	6	7	6

Updated to match(es) played on 30 May 2015. Source: Russian Premier League
A = Away; H = Home; W = Win; D = Draw; L = Loss

==== Matches ====
1 August 2014 1	Rubin Kazan	0 – 4	Spartak Moscow	Kazan
20:00 MSK (UTC+4)		Report	Dzyuba 26', 54'; Insaurralde (yellow card) 64'; Glushakov 75'; Parshivlyuk (yellow card) 84'; Barrios 89' (yellow card) 89'	Stadium: Central Stadium; Attendance: 20,624; Referee: Vitali Meshkov

10 August 2014 2	Dynamo Moscow	1 – 2	Spartak Moscow	Khimki
13:30 MSK (UTC+4)	Kokorin 3'; Vainqueur (yellow card) 26'; Douglas (yellow card) 90+3'	Report	Dzyuba 17', 51' (yellow card) 45+2'; Costa (yellow card) 26'; Källström (yellow card) 73'; Rebrov (yellow card) 86'	Stadium: Arena Khimki; Attendance: 15,351; Referee: Aleksei Eskov

14 August 2014 3	Krasnodar	4 – 0	Spartak Moscow	Krasnodar
21:00 MSK (UTC+4)	Izmailov 27'; Ari 56' (yellow card) 57'; Petrov (yellow card) 60'; Bystrov 62'; Joãozinho 67' (pen.)	Report	Makeyev (yellow card) 59'; Bocchetti (yellow card) 73'; Parshivlyuk (yellow card) 81'	Stadium: Kuban Stadium; Attendance: 12,300; Referee: Sergei Ivanov

17 August 2014 4	CSKA Moscow	0 – 1	Spartak Moscow	Khimki
13:30 MSK (UTC+4)	Wernbloom (yellow card) 5'; V.Berezutski (yellow card) 31'; Milanov (yellow card) 80'; Nababkin (yellow card) 90+3' (yellow-red card) 90+3'	Report	Tasci (yellow card) 32'; Insaurralde (yellow card) 43'; Makeyev (yellow card) 55'; Källström (yellow card) 57'; Davydov (yellow card) 73'; D.Kombarov 61' (pen.); Parshivlyuk (yellow card) 87' (yellow-red card) 90+3'	Stadium: Arena Khimki; Attendance: 15,000; Referee: Vladislav Bezborodov

23 August 2014 5	Ufa	1 – 2	Spartak Moscow	Perm
14:00 MSK (UTC+4)	Forbes (yellow card) 49'; Diego 74'	Report	Dzyuba 27', 34'; Yakovlev (yellow card) 90+1'; D.Kombarov (yellow card) 90+3'	Stadium: Zvezda Stadium; Attendance: 5,100; Referee: Igor Nizovtsev

30 August 2014 6	Amkar Perm	2 – 0	Spartak Moscow	Perm
17:00 MSK (UTC+4)	Kireyev 45+3'; Belorukov (yellow card) 53'; Gerus (yellow card) 68'; Peev 83'	Report	Makeyev (yellow card) 28'; Parshivlyuk (yellow card) 58'; Glushakov (yellow card) 85'	Stadium: Zvezda Stadium; Attendance: 12,600; Referee: Mikhail Vilkov

14 September 2014 7	Spartak Moscow	3 – 1	Torpedo Moscow	Moscow
13:30 MSK (UTC+4)	Promes 34', 71'; Jurado 73'	Report	Fomin (yellow card) 25'; Stevanović (yellow card) 44'; Katsalapov (yellow card) 62'; Vieira 89'	Stadium: Otkritie Arena; Attendance: 36,058; Referee: Sergei Karasev

20 September 2014 8	Spartak Moscow	1 – 1	Terek Grozny	Moscow
20:00 MSK (UTC+4)	Insaurralde (yellow card) 87'; Jurado 90+1'; Tasci (yellow card) 90+3'	Report	Maurício 14' (yellow card) 89'; Lebedenko (yellow card) 15'; Ivanov (yellow card) 26'; Kudryashov (yellow card) 54'	Stadium: Otkritie Arena; Attendance: 25,620; Referee: Aleksandr Egorov

27 September 2014 9	Zenit St.Petersburg	0 – 0	Spartak Moscow	Saint Petersburg
18:30 MSK (UTC+04:00)	Rondón (yellow card) 42'; Fayzulin (yellow card) 72'; Criscito (yellow card) 85'	Report	Dzyuba (yellow card) 42'; Makeyev (yellow card) 70'; Källström (yellow card) 87'	Stadium: Petrovsky Stadium; Attendance: 19,000; Referee: Igor Nizovtsev

19 October 2014 10	Ural Sverdlovsk Oblast	2 – 0	Spartak Moscow	Yekaterinburg
13:30 MSK (UTC+4)	Yerokhin 36'; Fontanello 65'	Report	Tasci (yellow card) 35'	Stadium: Central Stadium; Attendance: 9,600; Referee: Vitali Meshkov

26 October 2014 11	Spartak Moscow	1 – 1	Lokomotiv Moscow	Moscow
13:30 MSK (UTC+3)	Shirokov 87'	Report	Ćorluka (yellow card) 45'; Maicon (yellow card) 73'; Fernandes 84'	Stadium: Otkrytie Arena; Attendance: 39,074; Referee: Igor Fedotov

2 November 2014 12	Kuban Krasnodar	3 – 3	Spartak Moscow	Krasnodar
19:00 MSK (UTC+3)	Rabiu (yellow card) 23'; Popov (yellow card) 28' (goal) 68' (pen.); Oliseh 47', 55'; Khubulov (yellow card) 90+2'	Report	Tasci 11' (yellow card) 33'; Yakovlev (yellow card) 14'; Källström 61', 65'	Stadium: Kuban Stadium; Attendance: 16,111; Referee: Mikhail Vilkov

9 November 2014 13	Spartak Moscow	2 – 0	Arsenal Tula	Moscow
18:00 MSK (UTC+3)	Movsisyan 8'; Promes 22'; Ebert (yellow card) 61'	Report	Lozenkov (yellow card) 90+2'	Stadium: Otkritie Arena; Attendance: 21,100; Referee: Vladimir Moskalyov

23 November 2014 14	Spartak Moscow	4 – 2	Mordovia Saransk	Moscow
18:30 MSK (UTC+3)	Promes 9', 18'; João Carlos 27'; Parshivlyuk (yellow card) 44'; Dzyuba 90+3'	Report	Lomić 45' (pen.); Rln.Mukhametshin 58'	Stadium: Otkritie Arena; Attendance: 18,204; Referee: Vladislav Bezborodov

30 November 2014 15	Lokomotiv Moscow	1 – 0	Spartak Moscow	Moscow
13:30 MSK (UTC+3)	Shishkin (yellow card) 59'; Mykhalyk (yellow card) 69'; Kasaev 77'; N'Doye (yellow card) 85'	Report	Ebert (yellow card) 41'; Makeyev (yellow card) 72'; Glushakov (yellow card) 73'; D.Kombarov (yellow card) 85'	Stadium: Lokomotiv Stadium; Attendance: 11,000; Referee: Mikhail Vilkov

4 December 2014 16	Spartak Moscow	1 – 1	Rostov	Moscow
19:45 MSK (UTC+3)	Glushakov 75'; Ebert (yellow card) 76'	Report	Kanga (yellow card) 34'; Torbinski 71'	Stadium: Otkritie Arena; Attendance: 10,000; Referee: Sergey Kulikov

8 December 2014 17	Spartak Moscow	2 – 0	Ural Sverdlovsk Oblast	Moscow
20:00 MSK (UTC+3)	Davydov (yellow card) 58'; Jurado 63'; Rômulo 85'	Report	Smolov (yellow card) 53'; Podberyozkin (yellow card) 80'	Stadium: Otkritie Arena; Attendance: 12,214; Referee: Vladimir Moskalyov

8 March 2015 18	Spartak Moscow	1 – 3	Krasnodar	Moscow
13:30 MSK (UTC+3)	Källström (yellow card) 8'; Promes 87'	Report	Pereyra 61'; Ahmedov (yellow card) 66' (goal) 72'; Ari 67'	Stadium: Otkritie Arena; Attendance: 28,039; Referee: Sergei Ivanov

15 March 2015 19	Spartak Moscow	1 – 0	Dynamo Moscow	Moscow
13:30 MSK (UTC+3)	Parshivlyuk (yellow card) 11'; Glushakov (yellow card) 44'; Douglas 59' (o.g.); Timofeyev (yellow card) 78'; D.Kombarov (yellow card) 90+1'	Report	Kozlov (yellow card) 50'; Zhirkov (yellow card) 87'	Stadium: Otkritie Arena; Attendance: 37,923; Referee: Aleksei Nikolaev

21 March 2015 20	Torpedo Moscow	0 – 1	Spartak Moscow	Moscow
19:00 MSK (UTC+3)	Rykov (yellow card) 42'; Katsalapov (yellow card) 79'; Bilyaletdinov (yellow card) 80' (yellow-red card) 90+2'	Report	Promes 21'; Källström (yellow card) 43'; João Carlos (yellow card) 88'; Davydov (yellow card) 89'	Stadium: Otkritie Arena; Attendance: 20,147; Referee: Sergey Lapochkin

4 April 2015 21	Spartak Moscow	1 – 1	Kuban Krasnodar	Moscow
19:00 MSK (UTC+3)	D.Kombarov 22' (pen.)	Report	Armaș (yellow card) 21'; Kaboré (yellow card) 25'; Tkachyov 61'; Sosnin (yellow card) 62'; Xandão (yellow card) 67'; Ignatyev (yellow card) 89'	Stadium: Otkritie Arena; Attendance: 18,573; Referee: Vitali Meshkov

9 April 2015 22	Arensal Tula	1 – 0	Spartak Moscow	Moscow
16:45 MSK (UTC+3)	Kašćelan (yellow card) 14'; Lyakh (yellow card) 70'; Smirnov 90+1'	Report	Makeyev (yellow card) 41'; Promes (yellow card) 86'	Stadium: MSA Lokomotiv; Attendance: 18,500; Referee: Mikhail Vilkov
Note: Match plated at the MSA Lokomotiv in Moscow, instead of Arsenal Tula's regular Arsenal Stadium in Tula.

13 April 2015 23	Rostov	2 – 1	Spartak Moscow	Rostov-on-Don
19:30 MSK (UTC+3)	Kanga (yellow card) 15'; Grigoryev 35', 82'	Report	Insaurralde 37'; Promes (yellow card) 51'; Källström (yellow card) 54'; D.Kombarov (yellow card) 84'; Bryzgalov (yellow card) 90'; Glushakov (yellow card) 90+3'	Stadium: Olimp-2; Attendance: 15,710; Referee: Vladislav Bezborodov

18 April 2015 24	Mordovia Saransk	1 – 3	Spartak Moscow	Saransk
16:00 MSK (UTC+3)	Gapon (yellow card) 23'; Niasse 90+2'	Report	Promes 46', 78' (yellow card) 70'; Davydov (yellow card) 60'; Movsisyan (yellow card) 86' (goal) 90+3'	Stadium: Start Stadium; Attendance: 7,920; Referee: Sergei Ivanov

26 April 2015 25	Spartak Moscow	1 – 0	Rubin Kazan	Moscow
13:30 MSK (UTC+3)	Tasci (yellow card) 3'; Insaurralde (yellow card) 75'; Promes 90+1'	Report	Ozdoyev (yellow card) 4'; Kuzmin (yellow card) 5'; Navas (yellow card) 53'; Dyadyun (yellow card) 80'	Stadium: Otkritie Arena; Attendance: 20,777; Referee: Vladislav Bezborodov

2 May 2015 26	Spartak Moscow	1 – 1	Zenit St.Petersburg	Moscow
13:30 MSK (UTC+3)	Tasci (yellow card) 20'; Rômulo 48'; Ebert (yellow card) 52'	Report	Criscito (yellow card) 17'; Hulk 90+1'	Stadium: Otkritie Arena; Attendance: 38,704; Referee: Mikhail Vilkov

11 May 2015 27	Terek Grozny	4 – 2	Spartak Moscow	Grozny
13:30 MSK (UTC+3)	Rodolfo (yellow card) 29'; Ivanov (red card) 40'; Semyonov (yellow card) 45+1'; Mbengue 49', 53'; Aílton 90', 90+2'	Report	Tasci (yellow card) 2'; Krotov 27'; Källström (yellow card) 31'; Davydov (yellow card) 39'; Promes 75'	Stadium: Akhmat-Arena; Attendance: 16,833; Referee: Vitali Meshkov

17 May 2015 28	Spartak Moscow	0 – 4	CSKA Moscow	Moscow
13:30 MSK (UTC+3)	Ebert (yellow card) 21'; Bryzgalov (yellow card) 51'; Glushakov (yellow card) 90'	Report	Eremenko 11', 22'; Tošić 30'; Musa 63'; Milanov (yellow card) 90+1'	Stadium: Otkritie Arena; Attendance: 40,455; Referee: Aleksei Nikolaev

23 May 2015 29	Spartak Moscow	1 – 2	Ufa	Moscow
18:00 MSK (UTC+3)	Krotov (yellow card) 21' (goal) 27'; Rômulo (yellow card) 46' (yellow-red card) 67'; Ebert (yellow card) 70'; Tasci (yellow card) 88'	Report	Sukhov (yellow card) 7'; Paurević 22' (yellow card) 74'; Alikin (yellow card) 34'; Stotsky 40'	Stadium: Otkritie Arena; Attendance: 12,326; Referee: Igor Nizovtsev

30 May 2015 30	Spartak Moscow	3 – 3	Amkar Perm	Moscow
13:30 MSK (UTC+3)	Promes 64', 90+1'; Krotov 72'	Report	Prudnikov 16'; Cherenchikov (yellow card) 40'; Peev 44'; Butko 86'	Stadium: Otkritie Arena; Attendance: 11,527; Referee: Sergei Ivanov

==== League table ====
Pos	Team	Pld	W	D	L	GF	GA	GD	Pts	Qualification or relegation
4	Dynamo Moscow	30	14	8	8	53	36	+17	50	
5	Rubin Kazan	30	13	9	8	39	33	+6	48	Qualification for the Europa League third qualifying round
6	Spartak Moscow	30	12	8	10	42	42	0	44	
7	Lokomotiv Moscow	30	11	10	9	31	25	+6	43	Qualification for the Europa League group stage (Note: Lokomotiv Moscow qualified for Europa League group stage by winning the 2014–15 Russian Cup.)
8	Mordovia Saransk	30	11	5	14	22	43	−21	38	

Source: Russian Premier League
Rules for classification: 1) points; 2) number of matches won; 3) head-to-head points; 4) head-to-head wins; 5) head-to-head goal difference; 6) head-to-head goals; 7) number of head-to-head away goals; 8) goal difference; 9) number of goals scored; 10) number of away goals scored

=== Russian Cup ===
23 September 2014 Round of 32	Smena Komsomolsk	0 – 1	Spartak Moscow	Komsomolsk-on-Amur
09:00 MSK (UTC+4)	K.Eidelnant (yellow card) 31'; Alborov (yellow card) 45'; R.Malakhov (red card) 86'	Report	Yakovlev 21'	Stadium: Vanguard Stadium; Attendance: 14,500; Referee: Anton Anopa

30 October 2014 Round of 16	Rubin Kazan	2 – 0 (a.e.t.)	Spartak Moscow	Kazan
19:00 MSK (UTC+3)	Nabiullin (yellow card) 31'; Eduardo (yellow card) 75'; Livaja 108' (yellow card) 109'; Kuzmin (yellow card) 111'; Azmoun 120+6' (pen.)	Report	Costa (yellow card) 26' (yellow-red card) 110'; João Carlos (yellow card) 72'	Stadium: Kazan Arena; Attendance: 27,229; Referee: Kirill Levnikov

== Squad statistics ==
As of match played 30 May 2015

=== Appearances and goals ===
No.	Pos	Nat	Player	Total		Premier League		Russian Cup	
No.	Pos	Nat	Player	Apps	Goals	Apps	Goals	Apps	Goals
1	GK	(Russia) RUS	Anton Mitryushkin	1	0	1	0	0	0
2	DF	(Argentina) ARG	Juan Insaurralde	21	1	17+3	1	1	0
3	DF	(Russia) RUS	Sergei Bryzgalov	8	0	6+2	0	0	0
4	DF	(Russia) RUS	Sergei Parshivlyuk	28	0	26	0	1+1	0
7	MF	(Georgia (country)) GEO	Jano Ananidze	15	0	7+8	0	0	0
8	MF	(Russia) RUS	Denis Glushakov	28	2	24+3	2	1	0
10	FW	(Armenia) ARM	Yura Movsisyan	17	2	9+7	2	0+1	0
11	MF	(Armenia) ARM	Aras Özbiliz	1	0	0+1	0	0	0
15	MF	(Brazil) BRA	Rômulo	21	2	16+3	2	1+1	0
19	MF	(Spain) ESP	José Jurado	20	3	10+8	3	2	0
20	MF	(Germany) GER	Patrick Ebert	18	0	15+2	0	0+1	0
21	MF	(Sweden) SWE	Kim Källström	28	2	26+2	2	0	0
23	DF	(Russia) RUS	Dmitri Kombarov	25	2	24+1	2	0	0
24	MF	(Netherlands) NED	Quincy Promes	29	13	27+1	13	1	0
30	GK	(Russia) RUS	Sergei Pesyakov	2	0	1	0	1	0
32	GK	(Russia) RUS	Artyom Rebrov	29	0	28	0	1	0
34	DF	(Russia) RUS	Yevgeni Makeyev	28	0	24+2	0	2	0
35	DF	(Germany) GER	Serdar Tasci	22	1	19+2	1	1	0
37	MF	(Russia) RUS	Georgi Melkadze	2	0	0+2	0	0	0
40	MF	(Russia) RUS	Artyom Timofeyev	3	0	0+3	0	0	0
53	MF	(Russia) RUS	Artyom Samsonov	1	0	0	0	1	0
55	DF	(Brazil) BRA	João Carlos	16	1	10+5	1	1	0
57	FW	(Russia) RUS	Vyacheslav Krotov	10	3	7+3	3	0	0
64	DF	(Russia) RUS	Denis Kutin	2	0	1	0	1	0
69	FW	(Russia) RUS	Denis Davydov	20	0	7+12	0	1	0
87	MF	(Russia) RUS	Aleksandr Zuyev	3	0	0+2	0	1	0
88	DF	(Russia) RUS	Ilya Kutepov	1	0	0	0	0+1	0
Players away from the club on loan:
5	MF	(Argentina) ARG	Tino Costa	8	0	4+3	0	1	0
6	MF	(Brazil) BRA	Rafael Carioca	1	0	0+1	0	0	0
9	MF	(Russia) RUS	Roman Shirokov	6	1	3+2	1	1	0
14	FW	(Russia) RUS	Pavel Yakovlev	9	1	4+4	0	1	1
18	FW	(Paraguay) PAR	Lucas Barrios	1	1	0+1	1	0	0
22	FW	(Russia) RUS	Artem Dzyuba	14	7	10+3	7	1	0
33	DF	(Italy) ITA	Salvatore Bocchetti	5	0	3	0	1+1	0
Players who appeared for Spartak Moscow no longer at the club:
28	MF	(Ghana) GHA	Majeed Waris	4	0	1+3	0	0	0

=== Goal scorers ===
Place	Position	Nation	Number	Name	Premier League	Russian Cup	Total
1	MF	(Netherlands)	24	Quincy Promes	13	0	13
2	MF	(Russia)	22	Artem Dzyuba	7	0	7
3	MF	(Spain)	19	José Jurado	3	0	3
3	FW	(Russia)	57	Vyacheslav Krotov	3	0	3
5	MF	(Sweden)	21	Kim Källström	2	0	2
5	MF	(Russia)	8	Denis Glushakov	2	0	2
5	DF	(Russia)	23	Dmitri Kombarov	2	0	2
5	FW	(Armenia)	10	Yura Movsisyan	2	0	2
5	MF	(Brazil)	15	Rômulo	2	0	2
10	MF	(Paraguay)	18	Lucas Barrios	1	0	1
10	FW	(Russia)	14	Pavel Yakovlev	1	0	1
10	MF	(Russia)	9	Roman Shirokov	1	0	1
10	DF	(Germany)	35	Serdar Tasci	1	0	1
10	DF	(Brazil)	55	João Carlos	1	0	1
10	DF	(Argentina)	2	Juan Insaurralde	1	0	1
10				Own goal	1	0	1
				TOTALS	42	1	43

=== Clean sheets ===
Place	Position	Nation	Number	Name	Premier League	Russian Cup	Total
1	GK	(Russia)	32	Artyom Rebrov	8	0	8
2	GK	(Russia)	30	Sergei Pesyakov	0	1	1
				TOTALS	8	1	9

=== Disciplinary record ===
Number	Nation	Position	Name	Premier League		Russian Cup		Total	
Number	Nation	Position	Name	Yellow card	Red card	Yellow card	Red card	Yellow card	Red card
2	(Argentina)	DF	Juan Insaurralde	4	0	0	0	4	0
3	(Russia)	DF	Sergei Bryzgalov	2	0	0	0	2	0
4	(Russia)	DF	Sergei Parshivlyuk	7	1	0	0	7	1
8	(Russia)	MF	Denis Glushakov	5	0	0	0	5	0
10	(Armenia)	FW	Yura Movsisyan	1	0	0	0	1	0
15	(Brazil)	MF	Rômulo	2	1	0	0	2	1
20	(Germany)	MF	Patrick Ebert	6	0	0	0	6	0
21	(Sweden)	MF	Kim Källström	7	0	0	0	7	0
23	(Russia)	DF	Dmitri Kombarov	5	0	0	0	5	0
24	(Netherlands)	MF	Quincy Promes	3	0	0	0	3	0
32	(Russia)	GK	Artyom Rebrov	1	0	0	0	1	0
34	(Russia)	DF	Yevgeni Makeyev	6	0	0	0	6	0
35	(Germany)	DF	Serdar Tasci	8	0	0	0	8	0
40	(Russia)	MF	Artyom Timofeyev	1	0	0	0	1	0
55	(Brazil)	DF	João Carlos	1	0	1	0	2	0
57	(Russia)	FW	Vyacheslav Krotov	1	0	0	0	1	0
69	(Russia)	FW	Denis Davydov	5	0	0	0	5	0
Players away on loan:
5	(Argentina)	MF	Tino Costa	1	0	2	1	3	1
14	(Russia)	FW	Pavel Yakovlev	2	0	0	0	2	0
18	(Paraguay)	FW	Lucas Barrios	1	0	0	0	1	0
22	(Russia)	FW	Artem Dzyuba	2	0	0	0	2	0
33	(Italy)	DF	Salvatore Bocchetti	1	0	0	0	1	0
Players who left Spartak Moscow season during the season:
			TOTALS	72	2	3	1	75	3
