= Lucas Barrios =

Paraguayan footballer (born 1984)

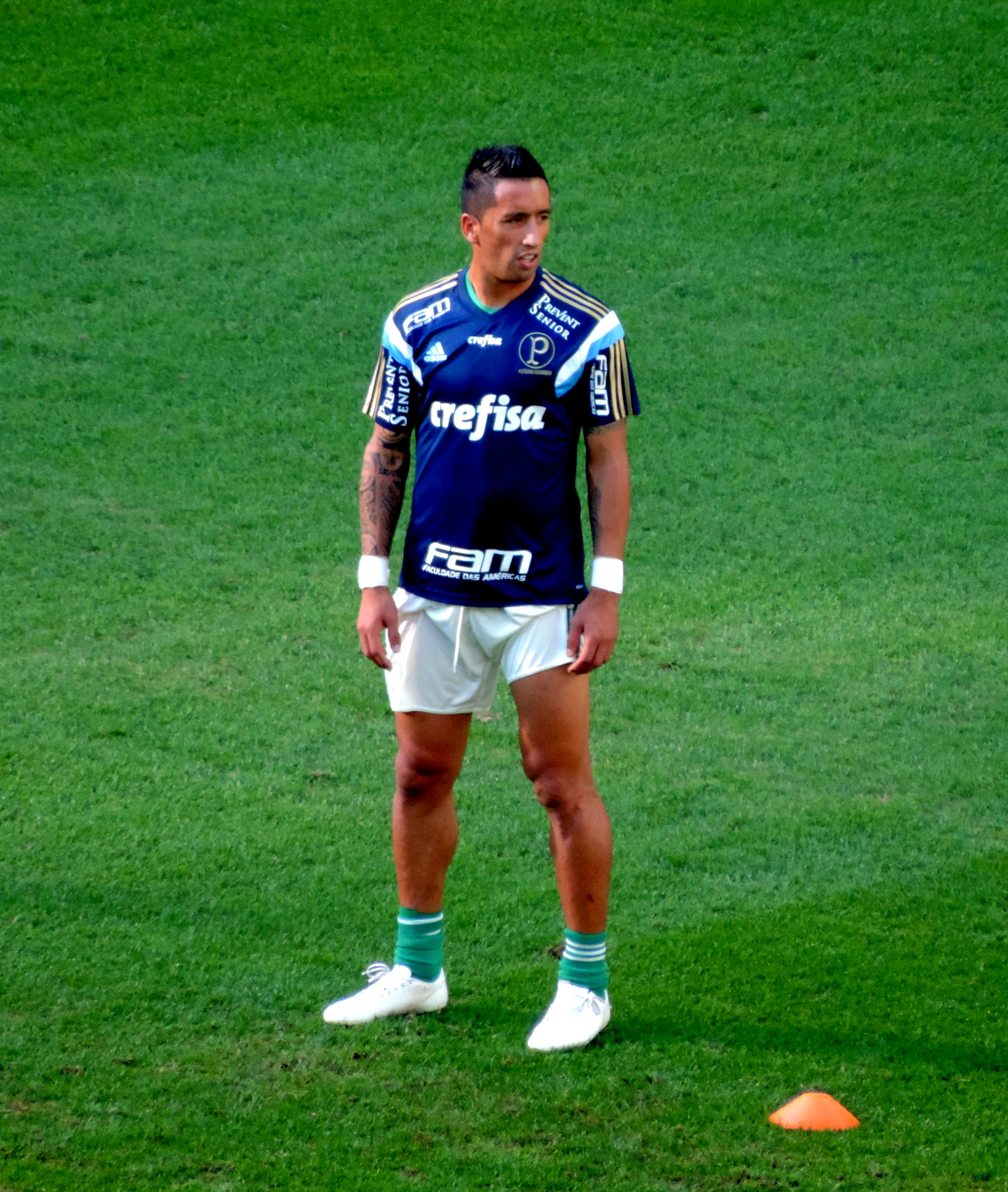
- Barrios with Palmeiras in 2015

Personal information
- Full name: Lucas Ramón Barrios Cáceres
- Date of birth: 13 November 1984 (age 42)
- Place of birth: San Fernando, Argentina
- Height: 1.87 m (6 ft 2 in)
- Position: Forward

Team information
- Current team: Sportivo Luqueño (manager)

Youth career
- Mitre
- –1999: Juventud de Liniers
- 1999–2002: Barracas Central
- 2002: Pacífico
- 2002: Huracán
- 2002: Argentinos Juniors

Senior career*
| Years | Team | Apps | (Gls) |
| 2002–2004 | Argentinos Juniors | 17 | (5) |
| 2003–2004 | → Tigre (loan) | 16 | (0) |
| 2004–2005 | Temuco | 28 | (12) |
| 2005–2006 | Tiro Federal | 12 | (1) |
| 2006–2007 | Cobreloa | 39 | (26) |
| 2007 | Atlas | 14 | (1) |
| 2008–2009 | Colo-Colo | 53 | (49) |
| 2009–2012 | Borussia Dortmund | 82 | (39) |
| 2012–2013 | Guangzhou Evergrande | 17 | (5) |
| 2013–2015 | Spartak Moscow | 16 | (2) |
| 2014–2015 | → Montpellier (loan) | 33 | (11) |
| 2015–2017 | Palmeiras | 22 | (6) |
| 2017 | Grêmio | 17 | (4) |
| 2018 | Argentinos Juniors | 12 | (4) |
| 2018 | Colo-Colo | 18 | (4) |
| 2019 | Huracán | 23 | (4) |
| 2020–2021 | Gimnasia LP | 16 | (3) |
| 2021 | Defensa y Justicia | 12 | (2) |
| 2022 | Patronato | 14 | (3) |
| 2023 | Sportivo Trinidense | 19 | (4) |
| 2023–2024 | Sportivo Luqueño | 30 | (4) |
| Total | | 518 | (189) |

International career
| 2010–2017 | Paraguay | 36 | (10) |

Managerial career
- 2025–2026: Sportivo Luqueño
- 2026–: Sportivo Luqueño
Medal record
Representing Paraguay
Copa América
| Runner-up | 2011 Argentina | Team |
- * Club domestic league appearances and goals

Lucas Ramón Barrios Cáceres (Spanish pronunciation: [ˈlukas raˈmom ˈbarjos ˈkaseɾes]; born 13 November 1984) is a Paraguayan football manager and former player who played as a forward. He is the current manager of Sportivo Luqueño.

During his playing days, Barrios was known for his effectiveness in the target area. This earned him his nickname La Pantera, which means The Panther. Even though he was born in Buenos Aires, Argentina, Barrios's mother is Paraguayan, which made him eligible to receive Paraguayan nationality at birth. He received his Paraguay nationality in March 2010 and made his international debut on 25 May of that year.

In 2008, Barrios was named top scorer of the year in the world by the IFFHS with 37 goals.

== Club career ==
=== Early career ===
Barrios began playing junior football for Argentine clubs Mitre, Juventud de Liniers, Barracas Central (where he was present from 1999 until February 2002) and Pacífico, before joining Huracán, where he was eventually forced to leave the club due to his small stature and low physical physique. Barrios then joined the youth teams of Argentinos Juniors after age 15, where he trained for one entire year without playing a youth fixture. Argentinos Juniors' coaches 'El Bichi' Borghi, Marcelo Barticcioto and 'El Checho' Batista ultimately took Barrios out of the club's youth team and promoted him to the club's first-team, where he debuted, before being loaned to Tigre in 2004.

Barrios rose to prominence as a forward for the Chilean club Cobreloa, where he had a spectacular scoring record. Before joining Cobreloa, he spent much of his professional career in second division football, either in Chile or Argentina. However, after joining Cobreloa, he has demonstrated his innate goal scoring ability, notching 14 goals in the Apertura 2007.

Barrios drew the attention of Chilean club Colo-Colo and Mexican club Necaxa with his excellent performance at Cobreloa. However, Barrios was finally signed by Mexican club Atlas for $2.5 million, where he played one short season in which he scored a single goal in 14 league appearances.

=== Colo-Colo ===
At the beginning of 2008 Colo-Colo signed Barrios on a six-month loan as a reinforcement for their 2008 Copa Libertadores campaign. Barrios returned to his pre-Atlas form as he was the leading goal scorer in the Apertura with 19 goals. In the play-offs Barrios was an integral part of the club's success. In the second leg of the semi-final Colo-Colo found themselves trailing Ñublense 2–0 on aggregate with only ten minutes remaining, when Barrios scored two goals in less than two minutes to qualify the team for the final. In the first leg of the final, Barrios added his fifth goal of the play-offs and his nineteenth of the season.

At the end of May 2008, and with the loan agreement due to expire in June 2008, Colo-Colo offered $1.5 million for Barrios which Atlas rejected as it did not meet their $2 million valuation. Eventually, Colo-Colo offered the $2 million Atlas was asking for Barrios. However Colo-Colo only purchased eighty percent of the player and Barrios holds the remaining twenty percent of his ownership. Barrios' salary with Atlas was almost $400,000 per year, but in order to be transferred to Colo-Colo he had to accept a forty percent pay cut.

Barrios maintained his fine form in the 2008 Clausura, scoring 18 goals in 16 matches only. This meant he finished top scorer in both halves of the championship, the first to do so since Patricio Galaz in 2004. He amassed an impressive 37 goals in 38 games which attracted the attention of a number of clubs.

Lucas Barrios was on the verge of signing a four-year contract with French club Nancy, but Colo-Colo's president Gabriel Ruiz-Tagle, on the afternoon of 12 January 2009, rejected the offer, but stated that further offers were being discussed.

On 29 January 2009, it was revealed that a $7 million offer from Espanyol had been rejected by Colo-Colo due to the way the deal was structured. On 28 June 2009, rumors from Greece claimed that Lucas Barrios signed a four-year-contract with Panathinaikos for a sum of €5 million. However it was later announced that even after Colo-Colo accepted the offer, Barrios declined to go, without any reasons being mentioned. Afterwards, Barrios was linked with Bundesliga teams Borussia Dortmund and fourth placed Hertha BSC. It was finally agreed that Barrios would go to Borussia Dortmund.

=== Borussia Dortmund ===
In July 2009, after just one and a half years at Colo-Colo, Barrios officially signed a contract with German club Borussia Dortmund. The German club paid a sum of €4.2 million. After having a tough start, Barrios finally broke through and scored five goals in five consecutive Bundesliga matches. Barrios also added four goals and one assist in three DFB-Pokal appearances. Since then he added 13 more goals, bringing his tally to 19 for the Bundesliga season, and 23 all together.

Barrios was a key part of Dortmund's push for Champions League football for next season. His goals, especially his hattrick on 24 April 2010 against 1. FC Nürnberg helped his team win 3–2 and to secure a place in the European League the following season.

His first season in Germany ended with a goal on the final day of the season away at Freiburg, the goal meant Barrios finished third in the Bundesliga top scorer of 2010 with 19 goals in 33 games.

==== 2010–11 ====
In his second season, Barrios continued his fine form for Dortmund. The Germans were drawn against Azerbaijan side FK Qarabağ in the Play-Off round of the Europa League. In the first leg on 19 August, both Barrios and Shinji Kagawa scored braces in a 4–0 victory at home. The second leg was held on 26 August at the Tofik Bakhramov Stadium in Baku. The game looked destined to end 0–0, but Barrios popped up and netted the winner in the first minute of stoppage time, leading to an aggregate win of 5–0.

After Dortmund lost on the opening day to Bayer Leverkusen, Barrios scored his first goal of the season against VfB Stuttgart on 29 August 2010. Dortmund started their UEFA Europa League campaign on 16 September against Ukrainian side Karpaty Lviv. Dortmund were down 3–2 late in the game, but Barrios scored the equalizer in the 87th minute and Mario Götze scored the winner in the second minute of stoppage time. It took Barrios almost another month to find the back of the net again in the Bundesliga for Die Borussia. But against 1. FC Kaiserslautern, he was able to score two goals, helping secure a 5–0 win on 22 September. On 2 October, Bayern Munich travelled to the Westfalenstadion. Barrios scored the first goal, in a 2–0 win for the home side, meaning they had won six games in a row since their opening day defeat. His goal helped Dortmund keep up their chase of league leaders Mainz 05. Dortmund played league leaders Mainz on 31 October at the Stadion am Bruchweg. Mario Götze opened the scoring for Dortmund in the first half and Barrios added a second after the break. The result meant that Dortmund leap-frogged Mainz into first place in the Bundesliga. Lucas continued this goalscoring form, scoring in each of the next two games. This included a 4–0 victory over Hannover and a 2–0 win over Hamburger SV. After being relatively ineffective in his side's 2–1 defeat of SC Freiburg on 20 November, Barrios netted in the next game against Borussia Mönchengladbach, the final goal of a 4–1 thrashing, and also added an assist.

In the third game back from the Bundesliga winter break, Lucas netted a goal in the second minute against VfL Wolfsburg, Dortmund went on to win the game 3–0. 26 February saw a top of the table clash with German powerhouse Bayern. Dortmund again prevailed against the Bavarians, this time by a score of 3–1. Lucas opened the scoring in the 9th minute at the Allianz Arena and put his side 13 points clear of Bayer Leverkusen at the top of the table. Because of his success with Dortmund, reports in Europe linked him with English giants Chelsea in a reported £17.5 million move.

On 2 April, Barrios had arguably his best performance all season against Hannover. Lucas scored the second and third goals of his side's 4–1 win and also grabbed an assist. He scored 14 goals through 30 games. With two games left, Dortmund secured the 2010–11 Bundesliga Championship, their first German title in nine years, when Barrios scored the winning goal in a 2–0 win over Nürnberg. In the final game of the season at home against Eintracht Frankfurt, Barrios grabbed a brace, after missing an early penalty, in a 3–1 win, bringing his Bundesliga total to 16 goals for the season. The result was terrible for Frankfurt, as it meant that they were relegated.

==== 2011–12 ====
Barrios endured a difficult campaign, losing form and his place in the side in favor of Robert Lewandowski. He managed his first goal of the season on 3 February 2012 when he came on a substitute in the 71st minute and knocked the ball past Raphael Schäfer to secure a 2–0 win over Nürnberg. After Dortmund secured their second Bundesliga title in a row, Barrios was given the start on 28 April when the champions travelled to relegated Kaiserslautern. Barrios helped his side to a 5–2 win, netting a terrific hat-trick, keeping them on pace to overturn the record of 79 points a Bundesliga season. Barrios had been close to signing for Premier League side Fulham in January but the deal was rejected; in May the club confirmed that the Paraguayan striker would leave the club in June and move to China.

=== Guangzhou Evergrande ===
==== 2012 ====
On 2 May 2012, Chinese Super League club Guangzhou Evergrande announced that they had officially signed Barrios on a four-year deal for a domestic record fee of €8.5 million. The club have been tracking Barrios since March 2012 when the club had agreed to sign Barrios at the end of the season. In his move to Guangzhou Evergrande, Barrios will earn €6.7m per year at Guangzhou Evergrande. Barrios made his unofficial debut in a reserve league match on 2 July. He scored a goal in the first half as Guangzhou trashed Beijing Guoan reserves 7–2. His first Super League match came on 15 July in a 1–0 home defeat against Guangzhou R&F, coming on as a substitute for Cléo in the 74th minute. On 18 July, Barrios scored his first goal for the first team in a 2012 Chinese FA Cup match which Guangzhou Evergrande beat Henan Jianye 2–1 at Tianhe Stadium. He scored first Super League goal three days later, in a 2–1 away victory against Henan Jianye. On 2 October, he scored first goal in the AFC Champions League against Al-Ittihad in the quarter-finals, however, Guangzhou was knocked out of their first Champions League journey by in this match. Barrios played as a substitute player for Cléo in the domestic league and won his first Super League title in the 2012 season. Barrios scored three goals in the two legs of the 2012 Chinese FA Cup final as Guangzhou won their first FA Cup title by defeating Guizhou Renhe 5–3 on aggregate. He also won the most valuable player of the FA Cup award.

==== 2014 ====
Although Cléo left for Kashiwa Reysol at the beginning of the 2014 season, Barrios continued to be a substitute player as another talented forward Elkeson joined the club. He played as start center forward in the 2013 AFC Champions League which Elkeson was excluded of the 30-man squad. Barrios started the 2013 season well by scoring the opening goal of the season for the club in the first round of 2013 AFC Champions League group stage match, a 3–0 home victory over J. League side Urawa Red Diamonds.

Barrios refused to return Guangzhou after FIFA International match day in the middle of June 2014. On 24 June, kicker revealed that Barrios would return to the Bundesliga in summer as a free agent, for his salary could not be paid guaranteed on-time and he did not receive salary in the last three months. Guangzhou Evergrande sent a lawyer's letter to kicker immediately and stated the club had fully complied with Barrios' contract and duly paid all of the salary for him. kicker deleted the interview later in the same day. FIFA has accepted this case and has entered the investigation stage. In July, Barrios was replaced by Elkeson in the 30-man squad which was submitted for the next stage of the AFC Champions League. Barrios later offered to apologize and tried to reconcile with Guangzhou Evergrande.

=== Spartak Moscow ===
On 10 August 2014, Guangzhou Evergrande announced that Barrios has left China to join Russian club Spartak Moscow for €7 million. He scored his first goal for Spartak on 1 December 2014 in a 6–1 home victory against Volga Nizhny Novgorod.

==== Loan to Montpellier ====
On 12 August 2014, French club Montpellier signed Barrios on a season-long loan, with an option to buy. Barrios debuted for Montpellier in Francés Ligue 1 in a 2–0 away loss against Olympique Marseille on 17 August 2014. Wearing the number# 10, Barrios was in the starting eleven and was substituted off of the field in the 57th minute for Souleymane Camara. Barrios debuted in the Couple de la Ligue on 28 October 2014, in a 1–0 away loss against Ajaccio. He played the entire 90 minutes of the fixture. He scored his first league goal in the 60th minute of a 4–0 away victory against Rennes on 6 December 2014. One week later, Barrios scored in the 16th minute of Montpellier's 3–3 home draw against Lens on 13 December 2014. On 17 January 2015, Barrios scored a hat-trick for Montpellier in a 3–2 away victory against Metz.

=== Huracán ===
In January 2019 he moved to Huracán.

=== Retirement and comeback ===
On 10 September 2022, he announced his retirement from professional football. However, in January 2023 he joined Sportivo Trinidense.

=== Retired again ===
On 30 December 2024, Barrios announced his retirement from professional football again.

== International career ==
Barrios started his dual citizenship process on 16 March 2010 hoping to get a chance to be in the 2010 FIFA World Cup which was granted on 8 April. He is the fourth Argentine to join the Paraguay National team along with Jonathan Santana, Néstor Ortigoza and Sergio Aquino. On 4 May 2010, Barrios was called up by trainer Gerardo Martino to join the Paraguay training camp for the World Cup.

Los Guaraníes played five games in the tournament, bowing out in the quarter-finals to eventual winner Spain. In 2011, Barrios was a runner-up in the Copa América with the Paraguay national team, appearing as a substitute in the final loss to Uruguay.

At the 2015 Copa América, Barrios made a substitute appearance against Argentina in Paraguay's opening match. After trailing 2–0 at half time, Barrios scored a 90th-minute equaliser in a 2–2 draw. On 20 June, he scored Paraguay's goal in a 1–1 draw with Uruguay which saw both teams progress to the knockout stage.

== Managerial career ==
On 6 October 2025, Barrios returned to Sportivo Luqueño after being named manager of the club. The following 3 March, he resigned.

== Career statistics ==
=== Club ===
As of match played 2 March 2017

Appearances and goals by club, season and competition
| Club | Season | League | | Cup | | Continental | | State League | | Other | | Total | |
| Club | Season | Apps | Goals | Apps | Goals | Apps | Goals | Apps | Goals | Apps | Goals | Apps | Goals |
|---|---|---|---|---|---|---|---|---|---|---|---|---|---|
| Argentinos Juniors | 2003–2004 | 17 | 5 | 0 | 0 | — | | — | | 0 | 0 | 17 | 5 |
| Tigre (loan) | 2004 | 16 | 0 | 0 | 0 | — | | — | | 0 | 0 | 16 | 0 |
| Temuco | 2005 | 28 | 12 | 0 | 0 | — | | — | | 0 | 0 | 28 | 12 |
| Tiro Federal | 2005–06 | 12 | 1 | 0 | 0 | — | | — | | 0 | 0 | 12 | 1 |
| Cobreloa | 2006 | 21 | 12 | 0 | 0 | — | | — | | 0 | 0 | 21 | 12 |
| Cobreloa | 2007 | 18 | 14 | 0 | 0 | — | | — | | 0 | 0 | 18 | 14 |
| Cobreloa | Total | 39 | 26 | 0 | 0 | — | | — | | 0 | 0 | 39 | 26 |
| Atlas | 2007 | 14 | 1 | 0 | 0 | 5 | 1 | — | | 0 | 0 | 19 | 2 |
| Colo-Colo | 2008 | 38 | 37 | 0 | 0 | — | | — | | 0 | 0 | 38 | 37 |
| Colo-Colo | 2009 | 15 | 12 | 0 | 0 | 6 | 3 | — | | 0 | 0 | 21 | 15 |
| Colo-Colo | Total | 53 | 49 | 0 | 0 | 6 | 3 | — | | 0 | 0 | 59 | 52 |
| Borussia Dortmund | 2009–10 | 33 | 19 | 3 | 4 | — | | — | | 0 | 0 | 36 | 23 |
| Borussia Dortmund | 2010–11 | 32 | 16 | 2 | 1 | 7 | 4 | — | | 0 | 0 | 41 | 21 |
| Borussia Dortmund | 2011–12 | 17 | 4 | 4 | 1 | 3 | 0 | — | | 0 | 0 | 24 | 5 |
| Borussia Dortmund | Total | 82 | 39 | 9 | 6 | 10 | 4 | — | | 0 | 0 | 101 | 49 |
| Guangzhou Evergrande | 2012 | 8 | 2 | 6 | 4 | 2 | 1 | — | | 0 | 0 | 16 | 7 |
| Guangzhou Evergrande | 2013 | 9 | 3 | 1 | 0 | 6 | 3 | — | | 0 | 0 | 16 | 6 |
| Guangzhou Evergrande | Total | 17 | 5 | 7 | 4 | 8 | 4 | — | | 0 | 0 | 32 | 13 |
| Spartak Moscow | 2013–14 | 15 | 1 | 2 | 0 | 2 | 0 | — | | 0 | 0 | 19 | 1 |
| Spartak Moscow | 2014–15 | 1 | 1 | 0 | 0 | 0 | 0 | — | | 0 | 0 | 1 | 1 |
| Spartak Moscow | Total | 16 | 2 | 2 | 0 | 2 | 0 | — | | 0 | 0 | 20 | 2 |
| Montpellier (loan) | 2014–15 | 27 | 11 | 2 | 0 | — | | — | | 0 | 0 | 29 | 11 |
| Palmeiras | 2015 | 13 | 5 | 8 | 3 | — | | — | | 0 | 0 | 21 | 8 |
| Palmeiras | 2016 | 9 | 1 | 3 | 0 | 4 | 1 | 6 | 2 | 0 | 0 | 22 | 4 |
| Palmeiras | 2017 | 0 | 0 | 0 | 0 | 0 | 0 | 1 | 1 | 0 | 0 | 1 | 1 |
| Palmeiras | Total | 22 | 6 | 11 | 3 | 4 | 1 | 7 | 3 | 0 | 0 | 44 | 13 |
| Grêmio | 2017 | 17 | 4 | 5 | 5 | 13 | 6 | 7 | 2 | 2 | 1 | 44 | 18 |
| Argentinos Juniors | 2017–18 | 12 | 4 | 0 | 0 | 0 | 0 | 0 | 0 | 0 | 0 | 12 | 4 |
| Colo-Colo | 2018 | 14 | 3 | 0 | 0 | 4 | 1 | 0 | 0 | 0 | 0 | 18 | 4 |
| Huracán | 2018–19 | 10 | 3 | 1 | 0 | 4 | 0 | 0 | 0 | 0 | 0 | 15 | 3 |
| Huracán | 2019–20 | 8 | 1 | 0 | 0 | 0 | 0 | 0 | 0 | 0 | 0 | 8 | 1 |
| Huracán | Total | 18 | 4 | 1 | 0 | 4 | 0 | 0 | 0 | 0 | 0 | 23 | 4 |
| Career total | | 404 | 172 | 37 | 18 | 56 | 20 | 15 | 6 | 2 | 1 | 513 | 216 |

=== International ===
Scores and results list Paraguay's goal tally first, score column indicates score after each Barrios goal.

List of international goals scored by Lucas Barrios
| No. | Date | Venue | Opponent | Score | Result | Competition |
|---|---|---|---|---|---|---|
| 1 | 25 May 2010 | RDS Arena, Dublin, Republic of Ireland | Republic of Ireland | 1–2 | 1–2 | Friendly |
| 2 | 30 May 2010 | Stade Joseph-Moynat, Thonon-les-Bains, France | Ivory Coast | 1–2 | 2–2 | Friendly |
| 3 | 2 June 2010 | Stadion Schützenwiese, Winterthur, Switzerland | Greece | 2–0 | 2–0 | Friendly |
| 4 | 7 September 2010 | Nanjing Olympic Sports Center, Nanjing, China | China | 1–0 | 1–1 | Friendly |
| 5 | 4 June 2011 | Estadio Ramón Tahuichi Aguilera, Santa Cruz de la Sierra, Bolivia | Bolivia | 1–0 | 2–0 | Friendly |
| 6 | 13 July 2011 | Estadio Padre Ernesto Martearena, Salta, Argentina | Venezuela | 2–1 | 3–3 | 2011 Copa América |
| 7 | 13 June 2015 | Estadio La Portada, La Serena, Chile | Argentina | 2–2 | 2–2 | 2015 Copa América |
| 8 | 20 June 2015 | Estadio La Portada, La Serena, Chile | Uruguay | 1–1 | 1–1 | 2015 Copa América |
| 9 | 30 June 2015 | Estadio Municipal de Concepción, Concepción, Chile | Argentina | 1–2 | 1–6 | 2015 Copa América |
| 10 | 17 November 2015 | Estadio Defensores del Chaco, Asunción, Paraguay | Bolivia | 2–1 | 2–1 | 2018 FIFA World Cup qualification |

== Honours ==
Colo-Colo

- Primera División de Chile: 2008 Clausura

Borussia Dortmund

- Bundesliga: 2010–11, 2011–12
- DFB-Pokal: 2011–12

Guangzhou Evergrande

- Chinese Super League: 2012
- Chinese FA Cup: 2012
- AFC Champions League: 2013

Palmeiras

- Copa do Brasil: 2015
- Campeonato Brasileiro: 2016

Grêmio

- Copa Libertadores: 2017

Individual

- Primera División de Chile Top goalscorer: 2008 Apertura, 2008 Clausura
- Paraguayan Footballer of the Year: 2010
- Chinese FA Cup Most Valuable Player: 2012

== See also ==
- Players and Records in Paraguayan Football
