= Danil Poluboyarinov =

Russian footballer

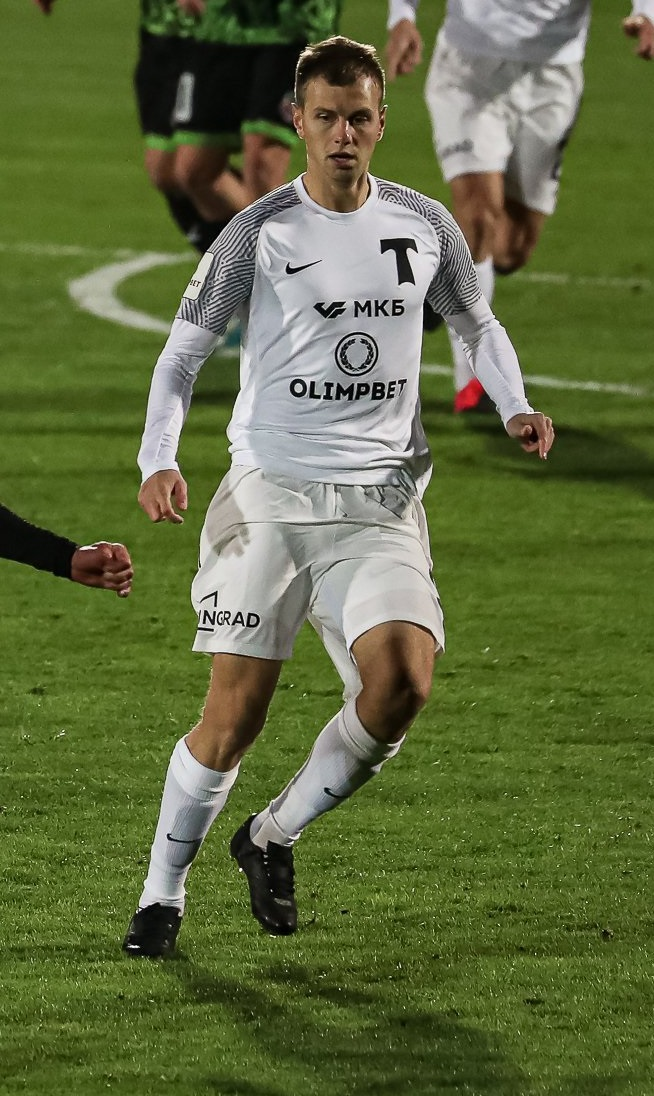
- Poluboyarinov with Torpedo Moscow in 2021

Personal information
- Full name: Danil Vadimovich Poluboyarinov
- Date of birth: 4 February 1997 (age 29)
- Place of birth: Ashgabat, Turkmenistan
- Height: 1.80 m (5 ft 11 in)
- Position: Midfielder

Team information
- Current team: Volgar Astrakhan
- Number: 8

Youth career
- 2002–2007: Mikhaylov SDYuSShOR Tver
- 2007–2017: Spartak Moscow

Senior career*
Years	Team	Apps	(Gls)
2016–2019	Spartak-2 Moscow	77	(1)
2018	Spartak Moscow	0	(0)
2019	Energetik-BGU Minsk	9	(0)
2020	Rotor Volgograd	1	(0)
2020–2021	Volgar Astrakhan	31	(0)
2021–2023	Torpedo Moscow	27	(0)
2022–2023	→ Akron Tolyatti (loan)	27	(0)
2023–2024	Volgar Astrakhan	27	(0)
2024–2025	Sokol Saratov	30	(0)
2025–	Volgar Astrakhan	45	(4)

International career^{‡}
2012	Russia U-15	7	(0)
2012–2013	Russia U-16	15	(1)
2013–2014	Russia U-17	14	(2)
2014–2015	Russia U-18	13	(2)
2015–2016	Russia U-19	8	(0)
- * Club domestic league appearances and goals as of 15 November 2026 ‡ National team caps and goals as of 29 March 2016

Danil Vadimovich Poluboyarinov (Russian: Данил Вадимович Полубояринов; born 4 February 1997) is a Russian football player who plays for Volgar Astrakhan.

== Club career ==
He made his debut in the Russian Football National League for FC Spartak-2 Moscow on 21 May 2016 in a game against FC Tom Tomsk.

On 15 July 2022, Poluboyarinov was loaned to Akron Tolyatti for the season.

== Honours ==
Rotor Volgograd

- Russian Football National League : 2019-20

Torpedo Moscow

- Russian Football National League : 2021-22
