= Andrei Svyatov =

Ukrainian footballer

Personal information
- Full name: Andrei Olegovich Svyatov
- Date of birth: 2 May 1993 (age 33)
- Place of birth: Pervomaiskyi, Ukraine
- Height: 1.75 m (5 ft 9 in)
- Position: Midfielder

Youth career
- 2003–2008: Konoplyov football academy
- 2009–2011: Chertanovo Education Center
- 2011–2014: FC Spartak Moscow

Senior career*
Years	Team	Apps	(Gls)
2013–2014	FC Spartak-2 Moscow	6	(0)
2014–2015	FC Tom Tomsk	3	(0)
2014–2015	→ FC Tom-2 Tomsk (loan)	0	(0)
2016	FC Khimik Novomoskovsk (amateur)		
2017	FC Khimik Novomoskovsk	8	(0)

International career
2010	Russia U17	4	(0)
- * Club domestic league appearances and goals

Andrei Olegovich Svyatov (Russian: Андрей Олегович Святов; born 2 May 1993) is a former Russian football player.

== Club career ==
He made his debut in the Russian Professional Football League for FC Spartak-2 Moscow on 22 August 2013 in a game against FC Zvezda Ryazan.

He made his Russian Football National League debut for FC Tom Tomsk on 24 April 2014 in a game against FC Sakhalin Yuzhno-Sakhalinsk.
