= Ivan Khomukha =

Russian footballer

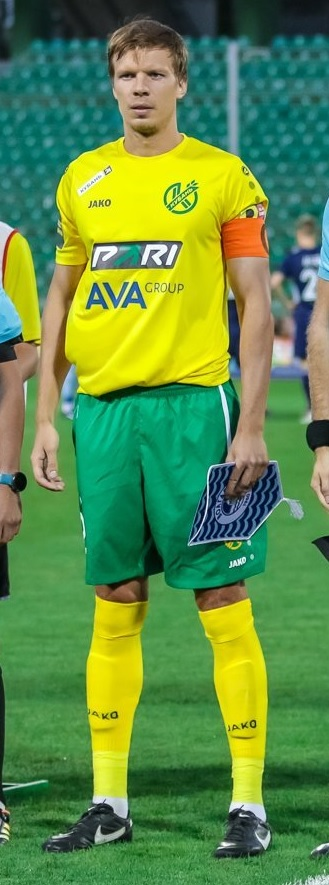
- Khomukha with Kuban Krasnodar in 2022

Personal information
- Full name: Ivan Viktorovich Khomukha
- Date of birth: 14 July 1994 (age 32)
- Place of birth: Ipatovo, Russia
- Height: 1.90 m (6 ft 3 in)
- Position: Centre-back

Team information
- Current team: Neftekhimik Nizhnekamsk
- Number: 22

Youth career
- –2007: Dynamo Stavropol
- 2007–2017: Spartak Moscow

Senior career*
Years	Team	Apps	(Gls)
2013–2018	Spartak-2 Moscow	68	(0)
2017	Spartak Moscow	0	(0)
2018–2019	SKA-Khabarovsk	34	(3)
2019	Rotor Volgograd	16	(0)
2020	Yenisey Krasnoyarsk	2	(0)
2020–2021	Volgar Astrakhan	30	(0)
2021	Chayka Peschanokopskoye	0	(0)
2021	KAMAZ Naberezhnye Chelny	13	(0)
2022–2023	Kuban Krasnodar	31	(1)
2023–2024	Volgar Astrakhan	40	(1)
2024–2025	Turan	12	(1)
2025	Volgar Astrakhan	17	(0)
2025–2026	Ufa	21	(0)
2026–	Neftekhimik Nizhnekamsk	0	(0)

International career
2009	Russia U16	3	(0)
2011	Russia U17	6	(0)
2011–2012	Russia U18	6	(0)
2011–2013	Russia U19	10	(0)
- * Club domestic league appearances and goals as of 16 May 2026

Ivan Viktorovich Khomukha (Russian: Иван Викторович Хомуха; born 14 July 1994) is a Russian football player who plays for Neftekhimik Nizhnekamsk.

== Club career ==
He made his debut in the Russian Professional Football League for Spartak-2 Moscow on 16 July 2013 in a game against Dynamo Bryansk. He made his Russian Football National League debut for Spartak-2 on 11 July 2016 in a game against Sibir Novosibirsk.

Khomukha joined FNL side Rotor Volgograd for the 2019–20 season, but after making just 16 appearances the club cancelled the defender's contract in December 2019.
