= Danila Buranov =

Russian football player

Personal information
- Full name: Danila Olegovich Buranov
- Date of birth: 11 February 1996 (age 30)
- Place of birth: Moscow, Russia
- Height: 1.78 m (5 ft 10 in)
- Position: Midfielder

Youth career
- FShM Moscow
- 2013–2015: Spartak Moscow

Senior career*
Years	Team	Apps	(Gls)
2014	Spartak-2 Moscow	1	(0)
2015	Torpedo Armavir	7	(0)
2016	Belshina Bobruisk	4	(0)
2017–2019	Arsenal Tula	2	(0)
2018	→ Strogino Moscow (loan)	11	(3)
2019	→ Zenit-2 St. Petersburg (loan)	12	(0)
2019	Mordovia Saransk	22	(5)
2020	Tom Tomsk	10	(1)
2021	Peresvet Podolsk	14	(6)
2022–2023	Spartak Kostroma	29	(3)

International career
2011–2012	Russia U16	12	(2)
2012–2013	Russia U17	23	(3)
2014	Russia U18	8	(1)
- * Club domestic league appearances and goals as of 10 June 2023

Danila Olegovich Buranov (Russian: Данила Олегович Буранов; born 11 February 1996) is a Russian former football player. He played as a defensive midfielder.

== Club career ==
He made his debut in the Russian Professional Football League for Spartak-2 Moscow on 25 May 2014 in a game against Oryol.

=== Arsenal Tula ===
In February 2017, he signed a contract with Arsenal Tula. He made his Russian Premier League debut for Arsenal on 19 March 2017 in a game against FC Zenit Saint Petersburg.

In February 2019, after six month on loan with Strogino Moscow he joined Zenit-2 St. Petersburg on loan again.

=== Mordovia Saransk ===
On 3 July 2019, he signed with FC Mordovia Saransk.

== Honours ==
- 2013 UEFA European Under-17 Championship winner with Russia, scored one of the goals in the final game shootout.

== Career statistics ==
=== Club ===
As of 8 December 2017

Club	Season	League			Cup		Continental		Total	
Club	Season	Division	Apps	Goals	Apps	Goals	Apps	Goals	Apps	Goals
Spartak Moscow	2013–14	Russian Premier League	0	0	0	0	0	0	0	0
Spartak Moscow	2014–15	Russian Premier League	0	0	0	0	–		0	0
Spartak Moscow	Total		0	0	0	0	0	0	0	0
Spartak-2 Moscow	2013–14	PFL	1	0	–		–		1	0
Torpedo Armavir	2015–16	FNL	7	0	1	0	–		8	0
Belshina Bobruisk	2016	Belarusian Premier League	4	0	1	0	–		5	0
Arsenal Tula	2016–17	Russian Premier League	2	0	0	0	–		2	0
Arsenal Tula	2017–18	Russian Premier League	0	0	0	0	–		0	0
Arsenal Tula	Total		2	0	0	0	0	0	2	0
Career total			14	0	2	0	0	0	16	0
