= Aleksei Grechkin =

Russian footballer

Personal information
- Full name: Aleksei Sergeyevich Grechkin
- Date of birth: 5 February 1996 (age 30)
- Place of birth: Novopokrovskaya, Russia
- Height: 1.83 m (6 ft 0 in)
- Positions: Defender; forward

Team information
- Current team: FC Sevastopol
- Number: 79

Youth career
- –2010: DYuSSh Novopokrovskaya
- 2010–2011: DYuSSh Nara Naro-Fominsk
- 2011–2012: FC Olimpia Gelendzhik
- 2013–2015: FC Spartak Moscow
- 2015–2016: FC Rostov

Senior career*
Years	Team	Apps	(Gls)
2016	FC Armavir	1	(0)
2017–2018	FC Afips Afipsky	44	(1)
2018–2019	FC Chayka Peschanokopskoye	13	(4)
2020	FC Chernomorets Novorossiysk	1	(1)
2020–2021	FC Yessentuki	24	(1)
2021–2024	FC Chernomorets Novorossiysk	74	(0)
2024	FC Metallurg Lipetsk	10	(0)
2024–2025	FC Forte Taganrog	29	(1)
2025	FC Kuban-Holding Pavlovskaya	10	(0)
2026	Shakhtyor Donetsk		
2026–	FC Sevastopol	19	(4)

International career
2012	Russia U-16	6	(1)
2012–2013	Russia U-17	10	(0)
- * Club domestic league appearances and goals as of 31 October 2026

Aleksei Sergeyevich Grechkin (Russian: Алексей Сергеевич Гречкин; born 5 February 1996) is a Russian professional football player who plays for FC Sevastopol.

== Club career ==
He played his first game for the main squad of FC Rostov on 24 September 2015 in a Russian Cup game against FC Tosno.
