= Aleksei Ivanushkin =

Russian footballer

Personal information
- Full name: Aleksei Sergeyevich Ivanushkin
- Date of birth: 20 November 1996 (age 29)
- Height: 1.83 m (6 ft 0 in)
- Position: Defender

Youth career
- 2013–2015: FC Spartak Moscow
- 2015–2016: FC Kuban Krasnodar

Senior career*
Years	Team	Apps	(Gls)
2015–2016	FC Kuban Krasnodar	0	(0)
- * Club domestic league appearances and goals

Aleksei Sergeyevich Ivanushkin (Russian: Алексей Сергеевич Иванушкин; born 20 November 1996) is a Russian former football player.

He made his debut for the main squad of FC Kuban Krasnodar on 23 September 2015 in a Russian Cup game against FC Shinnik Yaroslavl.
