= Dmitri Kayumov =

Russian footballer

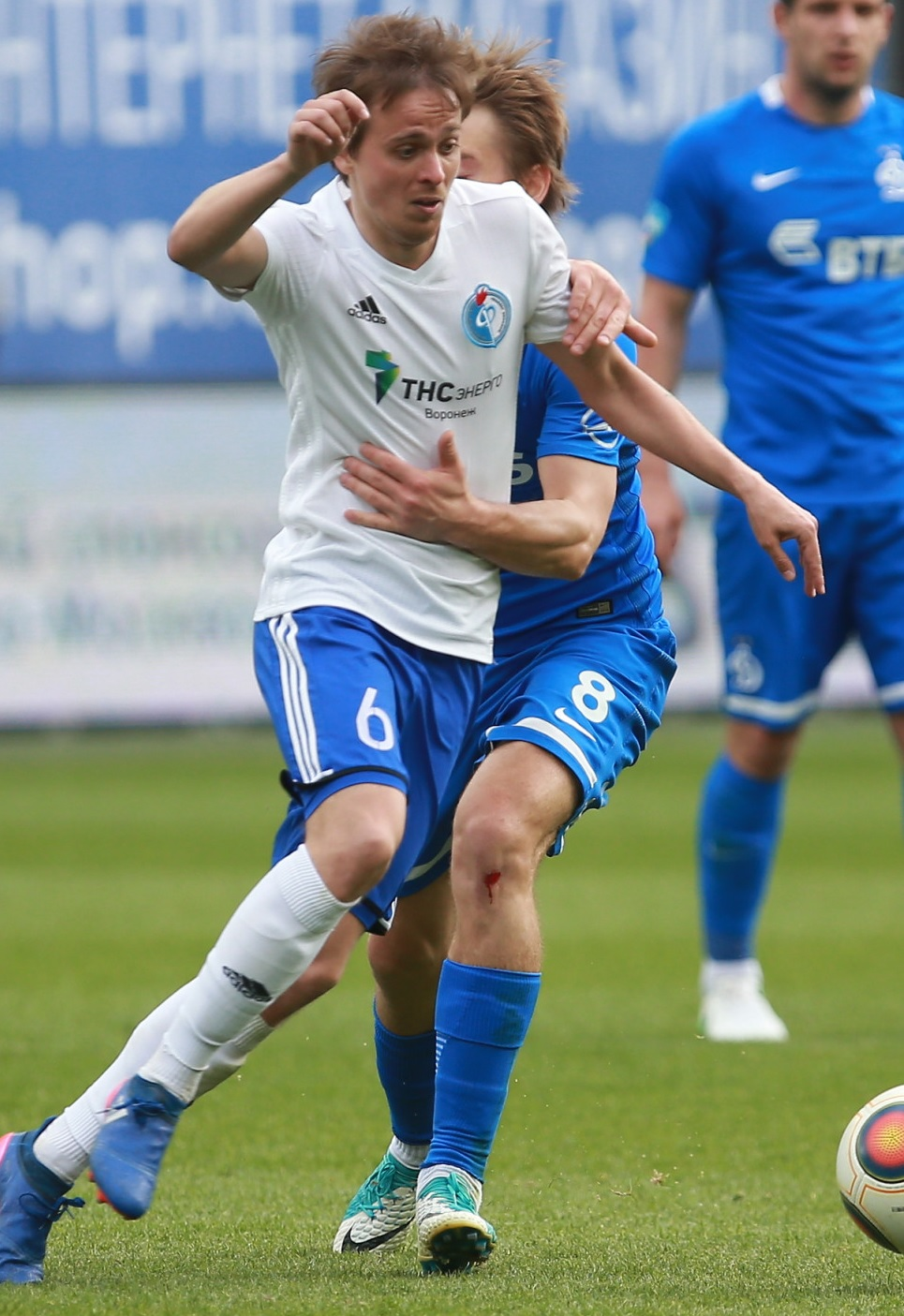
- Kayumov with Fakel in 2017

Personal information
- Full name: Dmitri Igorevich Kayumov
- Date of birth: 11 May 1992 (age 34)
- Place of birth: Reutov, Russia
- Height: 1.73 m (5 ft 8 in)
- Position: Midfielder

Youth career
- 2008–2011: FC Spartak Moscow

Senior career*
Years	Team	Apps	(Gls)
2011–2016	FC Spartak Moscow	4	(1)
2013–2014	→ FC Amkar Perm (loan)	7	(0)
2013–2016	→ FC Spartak-2 Moscow	53	(13)
2016	FC Tambov	8	(0)
2017	FC Fakel Voronezh	28	(2)
2018	FC Armavir	29	(4)
2019–2020	FC Avangard Kursk	25	(3)
2020–2021	FC Kuban Krasnodar	29	(7)
2021	FC Tom Tomsk	1	(0)
2021–2022	FC SKA Rostov-on-Don	21	(3)

International career
2010	Russia U18	4	(1)
2010	Russia U19	6	(0)
2011–2013	Russia U21	10	(2)
- * Club domestic league appearances and goals

Dmitri Igorevich Kayumov (Russian: Дмитрий Игоревич Каюмов; born 11 May 1992) is a Russian former professional footballer.

== Club career ==
He made his professional debut in the Russian Premier League on 23 October 2011 for FC Spartak Moscow in a game against FC Tom Tomsk and scored a goal on his debut.
