= Nikolai Fadeyev =

Russian professional football player

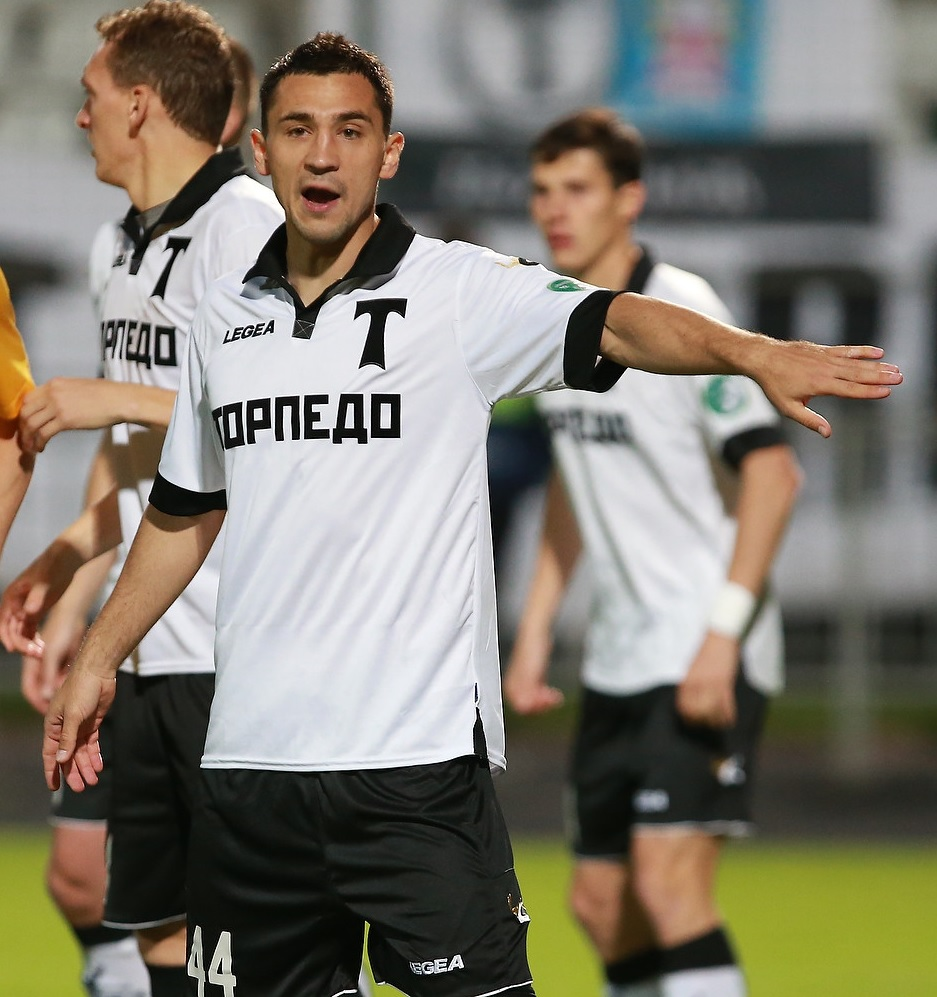
- Fadeyev with Torpedo Moscow in 2017

Personal information
- Full name: Nikolai Petrovich Fadeyev
- Date of birth: 9 May 1993 (age 33)
- Place of birth: Ulyanovsk, Russia
- Height: 1.79 m (5 ft 10 1/2 in)
- Position: Defender

Youth career
- –2013: FC Spartak Moscow

Senior career*
Years	Team	Apps	(Gls)
2012–2013	FC Spartak Moscow	0	(0)
2013	→ FC Amkar Perm (loan)	1	(0)
2014–2016	FC Spartak-2 Moscow	43	(1)
2016–2017	FC Khimki	12	(0)
2017–2018	FC Torpedo Moscow	25	(1)
2018	FC SKA-Khabarovsk	4	(0)
2019	FC Olimp Khimki	3	(0)
2021–2022	FC Sakhalinets Moscow (amateur)		

International career
2010	Russia U-17	1	(0)
2011	Russia U-18	6	(0)
2012	Russia U-19	3	(0)
- * Club domestic league appearances and goals

Nikolai Petrovich Fadeyev (Russian: Николай Петрович Фадеев; born 9 May 1993) is a Russian former professional football player.

== Club career ==
He played for FC Spartak Moscow in the 2012–13 Russian Cup game against FC Salyut Belgorod on 26 September 2012.

He made his Russian Premier League debut for FC Amkar Perm on 30 August 2013 in a game against PFC CSKA Moscow.
