= Vitali Meshkov =

Russian association football player

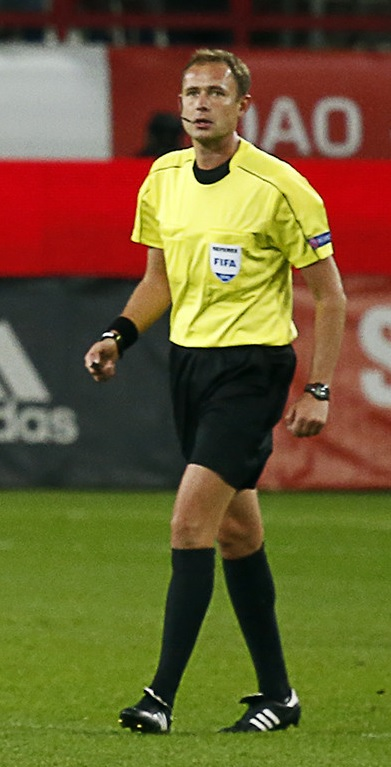
- Full name: Vitali Petrovich Meshkov
- Born: 18 February 1983 (age 43)

Domestic
Years	League	Role
2006–2009	Russian Second Division	Referee
2009–2013	Russian First Division	Referee
2011–	Russian Football Premier League	Referee

International
Years	League	Role
2012–	FIFA	Referee

Vitali Petrovich Meshkov (Russian: Виталий Петрович Мешков; born 18 February 1983) is a Russian professional football referee.

He has been a FIFA referee since 2012.
