= Aydar Lisinkov =

Russian footballer (born 1994)

Personal information
- Full name: Aydar Igorevich Lisinkov
- Date of birth: 2 January 1994 (age 32)
- Place of birth: Strezhevoy, Tomsk Oblast, Russia
- Height: 1.87 m (6 ft 2 in)
- Position: Defender

Youth career
- –2005: FC Rubin Kazan
- 2005–2008: Konoplyov football academy
- 2008–2011: Chertanovo Education Center
- 2012–2015: FC Spartak Moscow

Senior career*
Years	Team	Apps	(Gls)
2015–2016	FC Spartak-2 Moscow	19	(0)
2016–2017	FC Vityaz Podolsk	18	(1)
2017–2018	FC Khimki	32	(1)
2018–2020	FC Tom Tomsk	22	(1)
2020	FC Sokol Saratov	13	(0)
2022	FC Volga Ulyanovsk	0	(0)

International career
2011	Russia U-17	2	(0)
2015–2016	Russia U-21	4	(0)
- * Club domestic league appearances and goals

Aydar Igorevich Lisinkov (Russian: Айдар Игоревич Лисинков; born 2 January 1994) is a Russian former football player.

== Club career ==
He made his debut in the Russian Professional Football League for FC Spartak-2 Moscow on 30 April 2015 in a game against FC Khimki. He made his Russian Football National League debut for Spartak-2 on 1 November 2015 in a game against FC Tosno.
