= Yuri Shleyev =

Russian footballer

Personal information
- Full name: Yuri Nikolayevich Shleyev
- Date of birth: 26 June 1995 (age 31)
- Place of birth: Samara, Russia
- Height: 1.88 m (6 ft 2 in)
- Position: Goalkeeper

Senior career*
Years	Team	Apps	(Gls)
2010	FC Vodnik Mineralnye Vody		
2010–2012	FC Mashuk-KMV Pyatigorsk	0	(0)
2013–2015	FC Spartak-2 Moscow	0	(0)
2015–2016	FC Mashuk-KMV Pyatigorsk	35	(0)
2017	FC Anzhi Makhachkala	0	(0)
2017	FC Anzhi-2 Makhachkala	13	(0)
2018	FC Ararat Moscow	0	(0)
- * Club domestic league appearances and goals

Yuri Nikolayevich Shleyev (Russian: Юрий Николаевич Шлеев; born 26 June 1995) is a Russian former football goalkeeper.

== Club career ==
He made his debut in the Russian Professional Football League for FC Mashuk-KMV Pyatigorsk on 20 July 2015 in a game against PFC Spartak Nalchik.

He made his debut for the senior squad of FC Anzhi Makhachkala on 20 September 2017 in a Russian Cup game against FC Luch-Energiya Vladivostok.

== Career statistics ==
=== Club ===
As of 9 December 2017

Club	Season	League			Cup		Continental		Total	
Club	Season	Division	Apps	Goals	Apps	Goals	Apps	Goals	Apps	Goals
FC Mashuk-KMV Pyatigorsk	2010	PFL	0	0	0	0	–		0	0
FC Mashuk-KMV Pyatigorsk	2011–12	PFL	0	0	0	0	–		0	0
FC Mashuk-KMV Pyatigorsk	Total		0	0	0	0	0	0	0	0
FC Spartak Moscow	2013–14	Russian Premier League	0	0	0	0	0	0	0	0
FC Spartak Moscow	2014–15	Russian Premier League	0	0	0	0	–		0	0
FC Spartak Moscow	Total		0	0	0	0	0	0	0	0
FC Mashuk-KMV Pyatigorsk	2014–15	PFL	0	0	0	0	–		0	0
FC Mashuk-KMV Pyatigorsk	2015–16	PFL	23	0	1	0	–		24	0
FC Mashuk-KMV Pyatigorsk	2016–17	PFL	12	0	0	0	–		12	0
FC Mashuk-KMV Pyatigorsk	Total (2 spells)		35	0	1	0	0	0	36	0
FC Anzhi Makhachkala	2016–17	Russian Premier League	0	0	0	0	–		0	0
FC Anzhi Makhachkala	2017–18	Russian Premier League	0	0	1	0	–		1	0
FC Anzhi Makhachkala	Total		0	0	1	0	0	0	1	0
FC Anzhi-2 Makhachkala	2017–18	PFL	13	0	–		–		13	0
Career total			48	0	2	0	0	0	50	0
