= Vladlen Babayev =

Russian football player

Personal information
- Full name: Vladlen Igorevich Babayev
- Date of birth: 16 October 1996 (age 30)
- Place of birth: Volgograd, Russia
- Height: 1.80 m (5 ft 11 in)
- Position: Midfielder

Team information
- Current team: FC Tyumen

Youth career
- FC Olimpia Volgograd
- 2013–2017: FC Spartak Moscow

Senior career*
Years	Team	Apps	(Gls)
2017–2020	FC Volgar Astrakhan	64	(3)
2020–2021	FC Metallurg Lipetsk	28	(12)
2021	FC Chayka Peschanokopskoye	0	(0)
2021	FC Akron Tolyatti	15	(2)
2022	FC Metallurg Lipetsk	12	(3)
2022–2023	FC KamAZ Naberezhnye Chelny	31	(3)
2023–2025	FC Sokol Saratov	60	(4)
2025–	FC Tyumen	47	(10)

International career
2011–2012	Russia U-16	14	(5)
2013	Russia U-17	4	(0)
- * Club domestic league appearances and goals as of 17 October 2026

Vladlen Igorevich Babayev (Russian: Владлен Игоревич Бабаев; born 16 October 1996) is a Russian football player who plays for FC Tyumen.

== Club career ==
He made his debut in the Russian Football National League for FC Volgar Astrakhan on 15 July 2017 in a game against FC Rotor Volgograd.
