= Said-Ali Akhmayev =

Russian footballer (born 1996)

Personal information
- Full name: Said-Ali Saidovich Akhmayev
- Date of birth: 30 May 1996 (age 30)
- Place of birth: Moscow, Russia
- Height: 1.82 m (6 ft 0 in)
- Positions: Forward; winger

Youth career
- 2007–2014: Spartak Moscow

Senior career*
Years	Team	Apps	(Gls)
2015–2017	Rostov	0	(0)
2016–2017	→ Chernomorets (loan)	19	(0)
2018	Speranța Nisporeni	4	(0)
2018–2019	Kolomna	18	(2)
2019	Ararat Moscow	15	(3)
2021	Tambov	4	(0)
2021	Torpedo Vladimir	12	(1)
2022	SKA-Khabarovsk	4	(0)
2022	SKA-Khabarovsk-2	2	(0)
2022–2023	Khimki-M	24	(7)
2022–2023	Khimki	0	(0)
- * Club domestic league appearances and goals as of 10 June 2023

Said-Ali Saidovich Akhmayev (Russian: Саид-Али Саидович Ахмаев; born 30 May 1996) is a Russian football player.

== Club career ==
He made his debut in the Russian Professional Football League for FC Chernomorets Novorossiysk on 28 July 2016 in a game against FC Dynamo Stavropol.

He made his Russian Premier League debut for FC Tambov on 10 April 2021 against FC Khimki.

== Career statistics ==
As of 27 November 2022

Club	Season	League			Cup		Continental		Total	
Club	Season	Division	Apps	Goals	Apps	Goals	Apps	Goals	Apps	Goals
Rostov	2015–16	RPL	0	0	0	0	–		0	0
Chernomorets Novorossiysk	2016–17	Second League	19	0	3	0	–		22	0
Speranța Nisporeni	2018	Moldovan Super Liga	4	0	0	0	–		4	0
Kolomna	2018–19	Second League	18	2	–		–		18	2
Ararat Moscow	2019–20	Second League	15	3	2	0	–		17	3
Tambov	2020–21	RPL	4	0	–		–		4	0
Torpedo Vladimir	2021–22	Second League	12	1	1	0	–		13	1
SKA-Khabarovsk	2021–22	First League	4	0	–		–		4	0
SKA-Khabarovsk-2	2021–22	Second League	2	0	–		–		2	0
Khimki-M	2022–23	Second League	14	6	–		–		14	6
Khimki	2022–23	RPL	0	0	3	0	–		3	0
Career total			92	12	9	0	0	0	101	12
