= Konstantin Shcherbakov =

Russian footballer

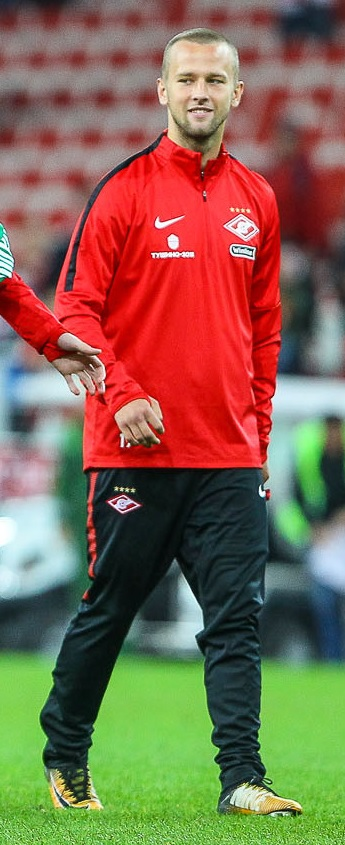
- Shcherbakov with Spartak Moscow in 2017

Personal information
- Full name: Konstantin Viktorovich Shcherbakov
- Date of birth: 20 March 1997 (age 29)
- Place of birth: Dolgoprudny, Russia
- Height: 1.77 m (5 ft 10 in)
- Position: Right back

Youth career
- –2017: FC Spartak Moscow

Senior career*
| Years | Team | Apps | (Gls) |
| 2016–2018 | FC Spartak-2 Moscow | 30 | (0) |
| 2017–2018 | FC Spartak Moscow | 0 | (0) |
| 2018–2019 | FC Rotor Volgograd | 1 | (0) |
| 2018–2019 | → FC Rotor-2 Volgograd | 18 | (1) |
| 2019–2021 | FC Shinnik Yaroslavl | 26 | (0) |
| 2022 | FC Tuapse | 7 | (0) |
| 2022–2023 | FC Spartak Kostroma | 7 | (0) |
| 2023–2024 | FC Khimik Dzerzhinsk | 26 | (0) |
| 2024–2025 | FC Irtysh Omsk | 15 | (0) |
| 2026 | FC Baranovichi | 7 | (0) |

International career^{‡}
| 2013 | Russia U16 | 2 | (0) |
- * Club domestic league appearances and goals as of 8 September 2026 ‡ National team caps and goals as of 16 May 2013

Konstantin Viktorovich Shcherbakov (Russian: Константин Викторович Щербаков; born 20 March 1997) is a Russian football player.

== Club career ==
He made his debut in the Russian Football National League for FC Spartak-2 Moscow on 21 May 2016 in a game against FC Tom Tomsk.
