= Vladislav Masternoy =

Russian footballer (born 1995)

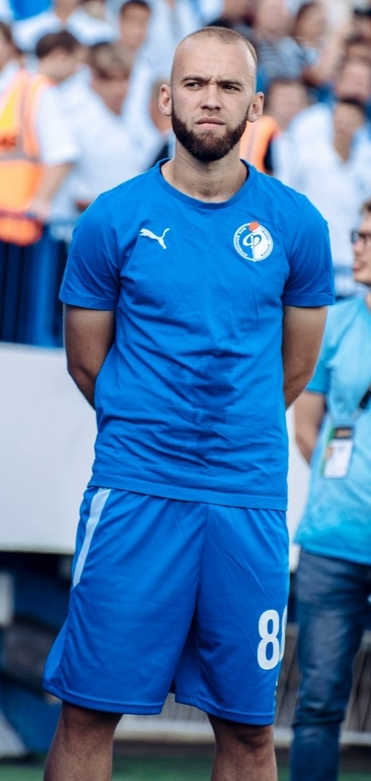
- Masternoy with Fakel Voronezh in 2022

Personal information
- Full name: Vladislav Romanovich Masternoy
- Date of birth: 17 November 1995 (age 30)
- Place of birth: Pskov, Russia
- Height: 1.79 m (5 ft 10 in)
- Position: Right-back

Youth career
- –2012: Chertanovo
- 2012–2013: Spartak Moscow

Senior career*
Years	Team	Apps	(Gls)
2013–2015	Spartak-2 Moscow	24	(0)
2015–2016	Avangard Kursk	23	(1)
2016–2018	Armavir	35	(1)
2018–2019	Pskov-747	23	(0)
2019–2024	Fakel Voronezh	139	(0)
2024–2025	Chernomorets Novorossiysk	13	(1)
2025–2026	SKA-Khabarovsk	14	(0)

International career
2013	Russia U18	5	(0)
2013–2014	Russia U19	9	(0)
- * Club domestic league appearances and goals as of 16 May 2026

Vladislav Romanovich Masternoy (Russian: Владислав Романович Мастерной; born 17 November 1995) is a Russian football player who plays as a right-back.

== Club career ==
He made his debut in the Russian Professional Football League for Spartak-2 Moscow on 22 August 2013 in a game against Zvezda Ryazan.

He made his Russian Football National League debut for Fakel Voronezh on 7 July 2019 in a game against Torpedo Moscow.

Masternoy made his Russian Premier League debut for Fakel on 17 July 2022 against Krasnodar. On 22 October 2023, Masternoy extended his contract with Fakel. On 16 December 2024, his contract with Fakel was terminated by mutual consent.

On 26 September 2025 Masternoy signed for Russian First League side FC SKA-Khabarovsk

== Career statistics ==
As of match played 22 October 2024

Appearances and goals by club, season and competition
Club	Season	League			Cup		Europe		Other		Total	
Club	Season	Division	Apps	Goals	Apps	Goals	Apps	Goals	Apps	Goals	Apps	Goals
Spartak-2 Moscow	2013–14	Russian Second League	10	0	—		—		—		10	0
Spartak-2 Moscow	2014–15	Russian Second League	14	0	—		—		—		14	0
Spartak-2 Moscow	Total		24	0	—		—		—		24	0
Avangard Kursk	2015–16	Russian Second League	23	1	2	0	—		—		25	1
Armavir	2016–17	Russian Second League	24	1	1	0	—		—		25	1
Armavir	2017–18	Russian Second League	11	0	2	0	—		—		13	0
Armavir	Total		35	1	3	0	—		—		38	1
Pskov-747	2018–19	Russian Second League	23	0	1	0	—		—		24	0
Fakel Voronezh	2019–20	Russian First League	25	0	1	1	—		2 (Note: Appearances in the FNL Cup)	0	28	1
Fakel Voronezh	2020–21	Russian First League	39	0	1	0	—		—		40	0
Fakel Voronezh	2021–22	Russian First League	32	0	2	0	—		—		34	0
Fakel Voronezh	2022–23	Russian Premier League	11	0	6	0	—		—		17	0
Fakel Voronezh	2023–24	Russian Premier League	25	0	4	0	—		—		29	0
Fakel Voronezh	2024–25	Russian Premier League	7	0	5	0	—		—		12	0
Fakel Voronezh	Total		139	0	19	1	—		2	0	160	1
Career total			244	2	25	1	0	0	2	0	271	3
