= Vladislav Teryoshkin =

Russian footballer

Vladislav Tereshkin
Personal information
- Full name: Vladislav Igorevich Tereshkin
- Date of birth: 16 July 1995 (age 31)
- Place of birth: Oryol, Russia
- Height: 1.89 m (6 ft 2 in)
- Position: Goalkeeper

Team information
- Current team: Avangard Kursk
- Number: 16

Youth career
- DYuSSh-3 Oryol
- UOR Master-Saturn Yegoryevsk
- –2017: Spartak Moscow

Senior career*
| Years | Team | Apps | (Gls) |
| 2013–2019 | Spartak-2 Moscow | 66 | (0) |
| 2019 | Spartak Moscow | 0 | (0) |
| 2020–2024 | Avangard Kursk | 76 | (0) |
| 2024 | Salyut Belgorod | 4 | (0) |
| 2025 | KDV Tomsk | 0 | (0) |
| 2026– | Avangard Kursk | 10 | (0) |
- * Club domestic league appearances and goals as of 31 October 2026

Vladislav Igorevich Tereshkin (Russian: Владислав Игоревич Терёшкин; born 16 July 1995) is a Russian football player who plays for Avangard Kursk.

== Club career ==
He made his debut in the Russian Professional Football League for Spartak-2 Moscow on 22 July 2013 in a game against Tambov. He made his Russian Football National League debut for Spartak-2 on 11 July 2015 in a game against Tom Tomsk.
