= 2017–18 FC Tosno season =

Tosno
2017–18 season
- Chairman: Viatcheslav Matyushenko
- Manager: Dmytro Parfenov
- Stadium: Petrovsky Stadium
- Russian Premier League: 15th
- Russian Cup: Champions
- Top goalscorer: League: Yevgeni Markov (8); All: Yevgeni Markov (8)
Home colours	Away colours

The 2017–18 FC Tosno season was the club's first season in the Russian Premier League, the highest tier of association football in Russia. They finished the season in 15th position, being relegated back to the FNL at the first opportunity, whilst also winning the 2017–18 Cup. Due to Tosno failing to obtain a UEFA licence, they did not qualify for the 2018–19 UEFA Europa League. Krasnodar, the fourth-placed team in the Russian Premier League, entered the group stage instead of the third qualifying round, fifth-placed Zenit St.Petersburg, entered the third qualifying round instead of the second qualifying round, and sixth-placed FC Ufa took the second qualifying round berth.

== Squad ==
As of 22 February 2018

Note: Flags indicate national team as defined under FIFA eligibility rules; some limited exceptions apply. Players may hold more than one non-FIFA nationality.

No.	Pos.	Nation	Player
1	GK	RUS	Mikhail Oparin
3	DF	RUS	Aslan Dudiyev
4	MF	RUS	Ilya Zhigulyov (on loan from Krasnodar)
5	DF	MNE	Nemanja Mijušković
8	DF	RUS	Sergei Sukharev
9	MF	RUS	Rustem Mukhametshin
10	FW	RUS	Georgi Melkadze (on loan from Spartak Moscow)
11	MF	RUS	Maksim Paliyenko
12	GK	RUS	Vasili Lukichev
14	MF	BLR	Alyaksandr Karnitsky
15	MF	CPV	Nuno Rocha
16	GK	RUS	David Yurchenko
19	MF	RUS	Aleksei Skvortsov
21	MF	UZB	Vagiz Galiulin
22	MF	RUS	Reziuan Mirzov (on loan from Rostov)

No.	Pos.	Nation	Player
23	MF	RUS	Aleksandr Troshechkin (on loan from Rostov)
24	DF	RUS	Timofei Margasov (on loan from Lokomotiv Moscow)
25	DF	RUS	Andrei Buivolov
26	DF	SRB	Rade Dugalić
27	MF	BRA	Anderson Carvalho
28	DF	RUS	Yevgeni Chernov (on loan from Zenit St. Petersburg)
29	MF	BRA	Ricardinho
31	MF	RUS	Aleksandr Makarov (on loan from CSKA Moscow)
34	FW	RUS	Pavel Pogrebnyak
34	MF	RUS	Vladimir Bystrov
64	DF	RUS	Denis Kutin (on loan from Spartak Moscow)
77	MF	SRB	Nikola Trujić
88	MF	SRB	Marko Poletanović
—	FW	CRO	Ante Vukušić

=== Out on loan ===
Note: Flags indicate national team as defined under FIFA eligibility rules; some limited exceptions apply. Players may hold more than one non-FIFA nationality.

No.	Pos.	Nation	Player
7	MF	RUS	Ilnur Alshin (at Avangard Kursk)
13	DF	RUS	Vitali Shakhov (at Baltika Kaliningrad)
91	MF	RUS	Yan Kazayev (at Tom Tomsk)

== Transfers ==
=== Summer ===
In: Note: Flags indicate national team as defined under FIFA eligibility rules; some limited exceptions apply. Players may hold more than one non-FIFA nationality.

No.	Pos.	Nation	Player
1	GK	RUS	Mikhail Oparin (from (Russia) Yenisey Krasnoyarsk)
3	DF	RUS	Aslan Dudiyev (from (Russia) Anzhi Makhachkala)
10	MF	RUS	Georgi Melkadze (on loan from (Russia) Spartak Moscow)
13	DF	RUS	Vitali Shakhov (from (Russia) Fakel Voronezh)
14	MF	BLR	Alyaksandr Karnitsky (from (Belarus) Gomel)
15	MF	CPV	Nuno Rocha (from (Romania) Universitatea Craiova)
16	GK	RUS	David Yurchenko (from (Russia) Anzhi Makhachkala)
22	MF	RUS	Reziuan Mirzov (on loan from (Russia) Rostov)
23	MF	RUS	Aleksandr Troshechkin (on loan from (Russia) Rostov)
27	MF	BRA	Anderson Carvalho (from (Portugal) Boavista)
28	DF	RUS	Yevgeni Chernov (on loan from (Russia) Zenit St. Petersburg)
30	GK	BLR	Alyaksandr Hutar (from (Russia) Orenburg)
34	MF	RUS	Vladimir Bystrov (from (Russia) Krasnodar)
63	DF	RUS	Irakli Badzagua
64	DF	RUS	Denis Kutin (on loan from (Russia) Spartak Moscow)
65	DF	RUS	Pavel Vishnevsky
67	DF	RUS	Aleksei Beryozkin
69	MF	RUS	Daniil Garibov
70	DF	RUS	Ilya Vasilyev
71	FW	RUS	Yevgeni Senin
72	FW	RUS	Stepan Kostyukov (from (Russia) Spartak Moscow academy)
73	MF	RUS	Ivan Shkipin
74	MF	RUS	Nikita Kovalyov
76	MF	RUS	Stanislav Manayev
77	MF	SRB	Nikola Trujić (from (Serbia) Vojvodina)
78	MF	RUS	Nikita Shumeyko
79	MF	RUS	Vyacheslav Kozlov
81	GK	RUS	Ivan Tikhonov
82	MF	RUS	Ivan Ignatenko
83	DF	RUS	Artyom Lavrenenko (from (Russia) Zvezda St. Petersburg)
84	DF	RUS	Nikita Olishevsky
85	GK	RUS	Vasili Fedosov
86	MF	RUS	Ivan Kuznetsov
87	FW	RUS	Yuri Yartsev
88	MF	SRB	Marko Poletanović (from (Belgium) Gent)
89	MF	RUS	Artak Abraamyan (own youth)
91	MF	RUS	Yan Kazayev (from (Russia) Khimki)
92	MF	RUS	Konstantin Kolyushko
93	DF	RUS	Pavel Kaloshin (from (Russia) FSC Dolgoprudny-2)
95	DF	RUS	Kirill Kuznetsov
96	DF	RUS	Dmitri Smirnov
98	MF	RUS	Vladislav Kochnov
99	MF	RUS	Sergei Ryabinin
—	FW	CRO	Ante Vukušić (from (Germany) Greuther Fürth)

Out: Note: Flags indicate national team as defined under FIFA eligibility rules; some limited exceptions apply. Players may hold more than one non-FIFA nationality.

No.	Pos.	Nation	Player
1	GK	RUS	Eduard Baychora (to (Russia) Khimki)
5	DF	RUS	Aleksei Aravin (to (Russia) Sibir Novosibirsk)
11	MF	RUS	Aleksandr Makarov (end of loan from (Russia) CSKA Moscow)
15	DF	RUS	Arseny Logashov (to (Russia) Baltika Kaliningrad)
16	MF	RUS	Ilnur Alshin (on loan to (Russia) Avangard Kursk)
18	MF	MNE	Mladen Kašćelan (to (Russia) Tambov)
19	DF	RUS	Konstantin Garbuz (to (Russia) Yenisey Krasnoyarsk)
22	GK	RUS	Artur Nigmatullin (to (Russia) Amkar Perm)
30	GK	BLR	Alyaksandr Hutar
48	FW	RUS	Aleksandr Kutyin (to (Russia) Yenisey Krasnoyarsk)
70	FW	RUS	Dmitri Bogayev (end of loan from (Latvia) Palanga)
75	FW	UKR	Artem Milevskyi (to (Belarus) Dinamo Brest)
76	FW	RUS	Pavel Kireyenko (end of loan from (Latvia) Palanga)
86	MF	RUS	Grigori Chirkin (to (Russia) Orenburg)
97	DF	RUS	Denis Nikitin (on loan to (Russia) Orenburg)
—	GK	RUS	Denis Kniga (to (Russia) Dynamo St. Petersburg, previously on loan to (Russia) Neftekhimik Nizhnekamsk)
—	MF	RUS	Nika Chkhapeliya (to (Russia) Fakel Voronezh, previously on loan to (Russia) Spartak Nalchik)
—	MF	UKR	Stanislav Prychynenko (to (Russia) Baltika Kaliningrad, previously on loan)

=== Winter ===
In: Note: Flags indicate national team as defined under FIFA eligibility rules; some limited exceptions apply. Players may hold more than one non-FIFA nationality.

No.	Pos.	Nation	Player
4	MF	RUS	Ilya Zhigulyov (on loan from (Russia) Krasnodar)
5	DF	MNE	Nemanja Mijušković (from (Kazakhstan) Taraz)
19	MF	RUS	Aleksei Skvortsov (from (Russia) Tambov)
24	DF	RUS	Timofei Margasov (on loan from (Russia) Lokomotiv Moscow)
29	MF	BRA	Ricardinho (from (Serbia) Red Star Belgrade)
31	MF	RUS	Aleksandr Makarov (on loan from (Russia) CSKA Moscow)
33	FW	RUS	Pavel Pogrebnyak (from (Russia) Dynamo Moscow)

Out: Note: Flags indicate national team as defined under FIFA eligibility rules; some limited exceptions apply. Players may hold more than one non-FIFA nationality.

No.	Pos.	Nation	Player
13	DF	RUS	Vitali Shakhov (on loan to (Russia) Baltika Kaliningrad)
17	FW	RUS	Anton Zabolotny (to (Russia) Zenit St.Petersburg)
20	FW	RUS	Yevgeni Markov (to (Russia) Dynamo Moscow)
57	DF	RUS	Ruslan Abazov (on loan to (Russia) Rotor Volgograd)
91	MF	RUS	Yan Kazayev (on loan to (Russia) Tom Tomsk)

== Competitions ==
=== Russian Premier League ===
==== Results by round ====
Round	1	2	3	4	5	6	7	8	9	10	11	12	13	14	15	16	17	18	19	20	21	22	23	24	25	26	27	28	29	30
Ground	H	A	H	A	H	A	H	A	H	H	A	H	A	H	A	H	A	H	A	H	A	H	A	A	H	A	H	A	H	A
Result	L	L	L	W	L	W	D	L	D	D	L	W	D	D	W	L	L	W	L	L	W	L	L	L	D	L	L	L	L	L
Position	15	16	15	12	12	12	12	12	12	13	14	13	14	14	13	13	13	13	13	14	12	13	14	15	15	15	15	15	15	15

Updated to match(es) played on 13 May 2018. Source: See Results
A = Away; H = Home; W = Win; D = Draw; L = Loss

==== Results ====
15 July 2017 1	Tosno	0 – 1	Ufa	Saint Petersburg
17:30 MSK (UTC+3)	Dugalić (yellow card) 81'	Report	Sysuyev 65'; Alikin (yellow card) 79'; Zhivoglyadov (yellow card) 83'	Stadium: Petrovsky Stadium; Attendance: 4,053; Referee: Vladimir Moskalyov

22 July 2017 2	Krasnodar	2 – 0	Tosno	Krasnodar
20:00 MSK (UTC+3)	Granqvist (yellow card) 28'; Pereyra 58'; Joãozinho 66'	Report	Kašćelan (yellow card) 52'	Stadium: Krasnodar Stadium; Attendance: 17,250; Referee: Aleksei Eskov

30 July 2017 3	Tosno	0 – 1	Zenit St.Petersburg	Saint Petersburg
20:00 MSK (UTC+3)	Chernov (yellow card) 19'; Galiulin (yellow card) 55'; Rocha (yellow card) 87'	Report	Kokorin 10'; Yerokhin (yellow card) 45+1'	Stadium: Petrovsky Stadium; Attendance: 12,555; Referee: Aleksey Sukhoy

6 August 2017 4	Arsenal Tula	1 – 2	Tosno	Tula
15:00 MSK (UTC+3)	Berkhamov 40' (yellow card) 55'	Report	Galiulin 48'; Markov 55'	Stadium: Arsenal Stadium; Attendance: 11,150; Referee: Sergey Ivanov

9 August 2017 5	Tosno	1 – 2	CSKA Moscow	Saint Petersburg
20:00 MSK (UTC+3)	Zabolotny 56'	Report	Olanare 49'; Dzagoev 62'; Vasin (yellow card) 86'	Stadium: Petrovsky Stadium; Attendance: 6,350; Referee: Vladimir Moskalyov

13 August 2017 6	Lokomotiv Moscow	0 – 2	Tosno	Moscow
17:30 MSK (UTC+3)	Rybus (yellow card) 37'	Report	Shakhov (yellow card) 34'; Melkadze (yellow card) 38'; Kvirkvelia 51' (o.g.); Dugalić (yellow card) 86'; Yurchenko (yellow card) 90+4'; Zabolotny 90+5'	Stadium: RZD Arena; Attendance: 8,009; Referee: Sergey Kulikov

18 August 2017 7	Tosno	0 – 0	SKA-Khabarovsk	Saint Petersburg
19:30 MSK (UTC+3)		Report	Putsko (yellow card) 90'	Stadium: Petrovsky Stadium; Attendance: 6,574; Referee: Pavel Kukuyan

26 August 2017 8	Rubin Kazan	1 – 0	Tosno	Kazan
17:30 MSK (UTC+3)	Kanunnikov 19'; Kudryashov (yellow card) 61'; Ozdoyev (yellow card) 64'; Azmoun (yellow card) 71'	Report	Kazayev (yellow card) 39'; Markov (yellow card) 61'	Stadium: Kazan Arena; Attendance: 10,136; Referee: Artem Chistyakov

9 September 2017 9	Tosno	2 – 2	Anzhi Makhachkala	Saint Petersburg
14:00 MSK (UTC+3)	Markov 5'; Galiulin 63'; Poletanović (yellow card) 80'	Report	Prudnikov 18'; Danchenko 25'	Stadium: Petrovsky Stadium; Attendance: 3,547; Referee: Aleksei Eskov

17 September 2017 10	Tosno	2 – 2	Spartak Moscow	Saint Petersburg
13:00 MSK (UTC+3)	Shakhov (red card) 29'; Markov 86'; Zabolotny 90'	Report	Luiz Adriano (yellow card) 18'; Dzhikiya 35'; Pašalić 63'; Samedov (yellow card) 67'; Promes (yellow card) 69'; Petković (yellow card) 77'	Stadium: Petrovsky Stadium; Attendance: 13,665; Referee: Vladmimir Seldyakov

24 September 2017 11	Ural Yekaterinburg	3 – 1	Tosno	Yekaterinburg
14:00 MSK (UTC+3)	Chanturia 5' (pen.); Yevseyev 9'; Bicfalvi 55' (pen.); Boumal (yellow card) 90+3'; Manucharyan (yellow card) 90+3'	Report	Paliyenko (yellow card) 23'; Mirzov (yellow card) 30' (yellow-red card) 90+3'; Zabolotny (yellow card) 56'; Dugalić (yellow card) 76'; Poletanović (yellow card) 82'; Trujić 85'; Melkadze (yellow card) 90+2'	Stadium: SKB-Bank Arena; Attendance: 2,591; Referee: Evgeny Turbin

30 September 2017 12	Tosno	1 – 0	Akhmat Grozny	Saint Petersburg
14:00 MSK (UTC+3)	Markov (yellow card) 25' (goal) 78'; Karnitsky (yellow card) 41'; Sukharev (yellow card) 65'; Trujić (yellow card) 81'; Shakhov (yellow card) 87'	Report	Shvets (yellow card) 23' (yellow-red card) 46'; Ángel (yellow card) 90+1'	Stadium: Petrovsky Stadium; Attendance: 4,757; Referee: Aleksei Nikolaev

16 October 2017 13	Amkar Perm	0 – 0	Tosno	Perm
17:30 MSK (UTC+3)	Ezatolahi (yellow card) 19'; Belorukov (yellow card) 75'; Miljković (yellow card) 90+3'	Report	Mirzov (yellow card) 5'; Kutin (yellow card) 13'; Chernov (yellow card) 65'; Poletanović (yellow card) 80'	Stadium: Zvezda Stadium; Attendance: 3,456; Referee: Aleksei Matyunin

21 October 2017 14	Tosno	1 – 1	Rostov	Saint Petersburg
14:00 MSK (UTC+3)	Markov 17'; Chernov (yellow card) 21'; Rocha (yellow card) 33'; Dugalić (yellow card) 72'	Report	Pesyakov (yellow card) 33'; Ingason 56' (pen.)	Stadium: Petrovsky Stadium; Attendance: 4,820; Referee: Vladimir Moskalyov

29 October 2017 15	Dynamo Moscow	0 – 1	Tosno	Khimki
14:00 MSK (UTC+3)	Pogrebnyak (yellow card) 90+1'	Report	Galiulin 9'; Sukharev (yellow card) 32'; Kazayev (yellow card) 43'; Troshechkin (yellow card) 55'; Zabolotny (yellow card) 59'; Karnitsky (yellow card) 90+2'	Stadium: Arena Khimki; Attendance: 3,657; Referee: Aleksey Sukhoy

4 November 2017 16	Tosno	1 – 3	Krasnodar	Saint Petersburg
16:30 MSK (UTC+3)	Zabolotny 4'; Markov (yellow card) 39'; Chernov (yellow card) 90+1'	Report	Smolov 12', 38'; Gazinsky 35'	Stadium: Petrovsky Stadium; Attendance: 4,699; Referee: Vitali Meshkov

19 November 2017 17	Zenit St.Petersburg	5 – 0	Tosno	Saint Petersburg
19:00 MSK (UTC+3)	Smolnikov (yellow card) 1'; Paredes 20' (pen.); Kuzyayev 52'; Ivanović 64'; Kokorin 70'; Dzyuba 86'	Report	Rocha (yellow card) 39'; Zabolotny (yellow card) 88'	Stadium: Krestovsky Stadium; Attendance: 48,031; Referee: Aleksey Eskov

25 November 2017 18	Tosno	3 – 2	Arsenal Tula	Saint Petersburg
16:30 MSK (UTC+3)	Markov 61', 79', 81'	Report	Čaušić 28'; Grigalava (yellow card) 68'; Tkachyov 76'	Stadium: Petrovsky Stadium; Attendance: 3,079; Referee: Alexey Nikolaev

1 December 2017 19	CSKA Moscow	6 – 0	Tosno	Moscow
19:30 MSK (UTC+3)	Vitinho 10' (pen.), 27' (pen.); Vasin 32'; Natkho 55'; Golovin 58' (penalty missed) 78'; Wernbloom 61'	Report	Zabolotny (yellow card) 60'	Stadium: VEB Arena; Attendance: 8,986; Referee: Roman Galimov

11 December 2017 20	Tosno	1 – 3	Lokomotiv Moscow	Saint Petersburg
19:30 MSK (UTC+3)	Paliyenko (yellow card) 44'; Trujić 69'; Dugalić (yellow card) 73'; Yurchenko (red card) 90+4'	Report	Farfán 19', 73'; Ignatyev (yellow card) 33'; Eder 54'; Kochenkov (yellow card) 87'	Stadium: Petrovsky Stadium; Attendance: 6,108; Referee: Artem Chistyakov

4 March 2017 21	SKA-Khabarovsk	0 – 1	Tosno	Khabarovsk
11:00 MSK (UTC+3)	Bogayev (yellow card) 30'; Tubić (yellow card) 39'; Samsonov (yellow card) 72'	Report	Mirzov (yellow card) 24' (goal) 69'; Chernov (yellow card) 41'; Zhigulyov (yellow card) 67'; Mikhail OparinOparin (yellow card) 90+2'	Stadium: Lenin Stadium; Attendance: 2,049; Referee: Roman Galimov

10 March 2018 22	Tosno	0 – 1	Rubin Kazan	Saransk
19:00 MSK (UTC+3)		Report	Enache (yellow card) 18'; Podberyozkin 75'; Granat (yellow card) 89'	Stadium: Start Stadium; Attendance: 1,310; Referee: Sergey Karasev
Note: Match moved to Start Stadium in Saransk.

17 March 2018 23	Anzhi Makhachkala	2 – 0	Tosno	Kaspiysk
19:00 MSK (UTC+3)	Anton 17', 43'	Report	Makarov (yellow card) 48'	Stadium: Anzhi Arena; Attendance: 10,200; Referee: Sergey Ivanov

31 March 2018 24	Spartak Moscow	2 – 1	Tosno	Moscow
19:00 MSK (UTC+3)	Fernando (yellow card) 32' (goal) 45+1'; Luiz Adriano (yellow card) 40' (goal) 75'	Report	Sukharev (yellow card) 45'; Pogrebnyak 80' (pen.)	Stadium: Otkritie Arena; Attendance: 28,517; Referee: Vitali Meshkov

8 April 2018 25	Tosno	2 – 2	Ural Yekaterinburg	Saint Petersburg
14:00 MSK (UTC+3)	Pogrebnyak 6', 59' (pen.) (yellow card) 36'; Zhigulyov (yellow card) 72'	Report	Boumal (yellow card) 36'; Ilyin 40'; Balažic (yellow card) 68'; Yegorychev (yellow card) 72'; El Kabir 87'	Stadium: Petrovsky Stadium; Attendance: 3,552; Referee: Artem Chistyakov

13 April 2018 26	Akhmat Grozny	1 – 0	Tosno	Grozny
19:30 MSK (UTC+3)	Rodolfo (yellow card) 40'; Roshi (yellow card) 47'; Mitrishev 53'; Ángel (yellow card) 85'	Report	Margasov (yellow card) 29'; Buivolov (yellow card) 77'	Stadium: Akhmat-Arena; Attendance: 12,341; Referee: Sergey Ivanov

22 April 2018 27	Tosno	0 – 2	Amkar Perm	Saint Petersburg
16:30 MSK (UTC+3)	Mirzov (yellow card) 73'; Buivolov (yellow card) 77'	Report	Ryazantsev 17' (pen.); Ezatolahi (yellow card) 87'; Gol (yellow card) 87'; Nigmatullin (yellow card) 90+1'; Kostyukov 90+2'	Stadium: Petrovsky Stadium; Attendance: 4,331; Referee: Aleksey Eskov

29 April 2018 28	Rostov	2 – 0	Tosno	Rostov-on-Don
19:00 MSK (UTC+3)	Guliyev (yellow card) 55'; Wilusz (yellow card) 63'; Shomurodov 67', 72'	Report	Makarov (yellow card) 2' (yellow-red card) 26'; Galiulin (yellow card) 35'; Dugalić (yellow card) 68'	Stadium: Rostov Arena; Attendance: 22,456; Referee: Aleksei Matyunin

5 May 2018 29	Tosno	1 – 2	Dynamo Moscow	Saint Petersburg
14:00 MSK (UTC+3)	Mirzov (yellow card) 5' (goal) 68'; Paliyenko (yellow card) 50'; Dugalić (yellow card) 85'; Yurchenko (yellow card) 90+4'	Report	Morozov (yellow card) 54'; Šunjić 56' (yellow card) 81'; Panchenko 79'	Stadium: Petrovsky Stadium; Attendance: 5,405; Referee: Pavel Kukuyan

13 May 2018 30	Ufa	5 – 0	Tosno	Ufa
14:00 MSK (UTC+3)	Zhivoglyadov 30', 84' (yellow card) 85'; Sysuyev 32'; Igboun 50'; Tumasyan (yellow card) 52'; Paurević 81'; Safronidi (yellow card) 88'	Report	Nuno Rocha (yellow card) 29'; Skvortsov (yellow card) 47'	Stadium: Neftyanik Stadium; Attendance: 10,632; Referee: Vitali Meshkov

==== League table ====
Pos	Team	Pld	W	D	L	GF	GA	GD	Pts	Qualification or relegation
12	Ural Yekaterinburg	30	8	13	9	31	32	−1	37 (Note: Head-to-head: Rostov 1–0 Ural, Ural 1–1 Rostov)	
13	Amkar Perm (D)	30	9	8	13	20	30	−10	35	Dissolved after the season (Note: On 13 June 2018, FC Amkar Perm announced that the Russian Football Union recalled their 2018–19 season license, making them ineligible for the Russian Premier League or Russian Football National League. On 18 June 2018, club president Gennadi Shilov announced that the club will not register for the third-tier Russian Professional Football League and will be dissolved. As a consequence, Anzhi Makhachkala was not relegated.)
14	Anzhi Makhachkala	30	6	6	18	31	55	−24	24 (Note: Head-to-head: Anzhi 2–0 Tosno, Tosno 2–2 Anzhi)	Qualification for the Relegation play-offs
15	Tosno (D)	30	6	6	18	23	54	−31	24	Dissolved after the season (Note: On 30 May 2018, Russian Football National League announced that FC Tosno failed in its appeal to obtain the FNL license for the 2018–19 season. On 9 June 2018, the founder of FORT Group (the company that owned the team), Maxim Levchenko, announced that the team is officially dissolved.)
16	SKA-Khabarovsk (R)	30	2	7	21	16	55	−39	13	Relegation to Football National League

Updated to match(es) played on 13 May 2018. Source: Russian Premier League, Soccerway
Rules for classification: 1) Points; 2) Head-to-head points; 3) Head-to-head matches won; 4) Head-to-head goal difference; 5) Head-to-head goals scored; 6) Head-to-head away goals; 7) Matches won; 8) Goal difference; 9) Goals scored; 10) Away goals scored.
(D) Dissolved after the season; (R) Relegated

=== Russian Cup ===
20 September 2017 Round of 32	Tyumen	1 – 2	Tosno	Tyumen
17:00 MSK (UTC+3)	Shakuro (yellow card) 31'; Guz (yellow card) 44'; Karpov 48'	Report	Sukharev (yellow card) 27'; Paliyenko 34', 38'; Kutin (yellow card) 86'	Stadium: Geolog Stadium; Attendance: 2,800; Referee: Sergey Ivanov

25 October 2017 Round of 16	Tosno	0 – 0 (6 – 5 p)	Tom Tomsk	Saint Petersburg
19:00 MSK (UTC+3)	Dugalić (yellow card) 41'	Report	Zuykov (yellow card) 42'; Makurin (yellow card) 55'; Sanaya (yellow card) 78'	Stadium: Petrovsky Stadium; Attendance: 1,248; Referee: Sergey Ivanov
	Penalties
	Dugalić (penalty scored); Markov (penalty scored); Shakhov (penalty scored); Trujić (penalty scored); Nuno Rocha (penalty missed); Sukharev (penalty scored); Mirzov (penalty scored)		Mikuckis (penalty scored); Girdvainis (penalty scored); Sobolev (penalty missed); Zuykov (penalty scored); Puljić (penalty scored); Pomerko (penalty scored); Kudryashov (penalty missed)

1 March 2018 Quarterfinal	Tosno	2 – 1	Luch-Energiya Vladivostok	Saint Petersburg
MSK (UTC+3)	Buivolov 22'; Pogrebnyak 27'; Margasov (yellow card) 89'	Report	Myazin (yellow card) 47' (goal) 51'; Pavlenko (yellow card) 86'	Stadium: Petrovsky Stadium; Attendance: 300; Referee: Aleksei Matyunin

18 April 2018 Semifinal	Spartak Moscow	1 – 1 (a.e.t.) (4 – 5 p)	Tosno	Moscow
18:30 MSK (UTC+3)	Zobnin (yellow card) 35'; Zé Luís 62'	Report	Dugalić (yellow card) 4'; Buivolov (yellow card) 80'; Galiulin 88'; Nuno Rocha (yellow card) 108'; Paliyenko (yellow card) 119'; Yurchenko (yellow card) 120+1'	Stadium: Otkrytiye Arena; Attendance: 22,335; Referee: Roman Galimov
	Penalties
	Luiz Adriano (penalty scored); D. Kombarov (penalty scored); Fernando (penalty missed); Zé Luís (penalty scored); Promes (penalty scored); Glushakov (penalty missed)		Dugalić (penalty missed); Galiulin (penalty scored); Trujić (penalty scored); Zhigulyov (penalty scored); Buivolov (penalty scored); Nuno Rocha (penalty scored)

==== Final ====
9 May 2018	Tosno	2 – 1	Avangard Kursk	Volgograd
19:00 MSK (UTC+3)	Skvortsov 10'; Buivolov (yellow card) 56'; Mirzov 80' (yellow card) 81'	Report	Kireyev 16'; Fedchuk (yellow card) 76'	Stadium: Volgograd Arena; Attendance: 40,373; Referee: Sergey Karasev

== Squad statistics ==
As of Match played 13 May 2018

=== Appearances and goals ===
No.	Pos	Nat	Player	Total		Premier League		Russian Cup	
No.	Pos	Nat	Player	Apps	Goals	Apps	Goals	Apps	Goals
1	GK	(Russia) RUS	Mikhail Oparin	4	0	2	0	2	0
3	DF	(Russia) RUS	Aslan Dudiyev	7	0	7	0	0	0
4	MF	(Russia) RUS	Ilya Zhigulyov	13	0	8+2	0	3	0
5	DF	(Montenegro) MNE	Nemanja Mijušković	2	0	2	0	0	0
8	DF	(Russia) RUS	Sergei Sukharev	11	0	8	0	3	0
9	MF	(Russia) RUS	Rustem Mukhametshin	8	0	4+3	0	1	0
10	FW	(Russia) RUS	Georgi Melkadze	22	0	8+13	0	1	0
11	MF	(Russia) RUS	Maksim Paliyenko	15	2	7+4	0	3+1	2
13	DF	(Russia) RUS	Vitali Shakhov	14	0	11+2	0	1	0
14	MF	(Belarus) BLR	Alyaksandr Karnitsky	25	0	20+3	0	1+1	0
15	MF	(Cape Verde) CPV	Nuno Rocha	30	0	20+7	0	1+2	0
16	GK	(Russia) RUS	David Yurchenko	31	0	28	0	3	0
19	MF	(Russia) RUS	Aleksei Skvortsov	4	1	1+2	0	1	1
21	MF	(Uzbekistan) UZB	Vagiz Galiulin	27	4	23	3	4	1
22	MF	(Russia) RUS	Reziuan Mirzov	25	3	15+5	2	5	1
23	MF	(Russia) RUS	Aleksandr Troshechkin	9	0	2+6	0	1	0
24	DF	(Russia) RUS	Timofei Margasov	12	0	9	0	3	0
25	DF	(Russia) RUS	Andrei Buivolov	25	1	20+1	0	4	1
26	DF	(Serbia) SRB	Rade Dugalić	31	0	28	0	3	0
27	MF	(Brazil) BRA	Anderson Carvalho	1	0	0+1	0	0	0
28	DF	(Russia) RUS	Yevgeni Chernov	29	0	25	0	4	0
29	MF	(Brazil) BRA	Ricardinho	11	0	4+5	0	1+1	0
31	MF	(Russia) RUS	Aleksandr Makarov	7	0	1+5	0	0+1	0
33	FW	(Russia) RUS	Pavel Pogrebnyak	8	4	6	3	2	1
34	MF	(Russia) RUS	Vladimir Bystrov	4	0	2+1	0	0+1	0
64	DF	(Russia) RUS	Denis Kutin	5	0	4	0	1	0
77	MF	(Serbia) SRB	Nikola Trujić	18	2	4+11	2	0+3	0
88	MF	(Serbia) SRB	Marko Poletanović	21	0	18	0	3	0
91	MF	(Russia) RUS	Yan Kazayev	17	0	9+6	0	1+1	0
Players away from the club on loan:
7	MF	(Russia) RUS	Ilnur Alshin	1	0	0+1	0	0	0
Players who left Tosno during the season:
17	FW	(Russia) RUS	Anton Zabolotny	19	4	19	4	0	0
18	MF	(Montenegro) MNE	Mladen Kašćelan	2	0	2	0	0	0
20	FW	(Russia) RUS	Yevgeni Markov	21	8	12+7	8	2	0
57	DF	(Russia) RUS	Ruslan Abazov	3	0	1+1	0	1	0

=== Goal scorers ===
Place	Position	Nation	Number	Name	Premier League	Russian Cup	Total
1	FW	(Russia)	20	Yevgeni Markov	8	0	8
2	FW	(Russia)	17	Anton Zabolotny	4	0	4
2	FW	(Russia)	33	Pavel Pogrebnyak	3	1	4
2	MF	(Uzbekistan)	21	Vagiz Galiulin	3	1	4
5	MF	(Russia)	22	Reziuan Mirzov	2	1	3
6	MF	(Serbia)	77	Nikola Trujić	2	0	2
6	MF	(Russia)	11	Maksim Paliyenko	0	2	2
8	MF	(Russia)	25	Andrei Buivolov	0	1	1
8	MF	(Russia)	19	Aleksei Skvortsov	0	1	1
8				Own goal	1	0	1
				TOTALS	23	7	30

=== Disciplinary record ===
Number	Nation	Position	Name	Premier League		Russian Cup		Total	
Number	Nation	Position	Name	Yellow card	Red card	Yellow card	Red card	Yellow card	Red card
1	(Russia)	GK	Mikhail Oparin	1	0	0	0	1	0
4	(Russia)	MF	Ilya Zhigulyov	2	0	0	0	2	0
8	(Russia)	DF	Sergei Sukharev	3	0	1	0	4	0
10	(Russia)	FW	Georgi Melkadze	2	0	0	0	2	0
11	(Russia)	MF	Maksim Paliyenko	3	0	1	0	4	0
13	(Russia)	DF	Vitali Shakhov	2	1	0	0	2	1
14	(Belarus)	MF	Alyaksandr Karnitsky	2	0	0	0	2	0
15	(Cape Verde)	MF	Nuno Rocha	4	0	1	0	5	0
16	(Russia)	GK	David Yurchenko	2	1	1	0	3	1
19	(Russia)	MF	Aleksei Skvortsov	1	0	0	0	1	0
21	(Uzbekistan)	MF	Vagiz Galiulin	2	0	0	0	2	0
22	(Russia)	MF	Reziuan Mirzov	6	1	1	0	7	1
23	(Russia)	MF	Aleksandr Troshechkin	1	0	0	0	1	0
24	(Russia)	DF	Timofei Margasov	1	0	1	0	2	0
25	(Russia)	DF	Andrei Buivolov	2	0	2	0	4	0
26	(Serbia)	DF	Rade Dugalić	7	0	2	0	9	0
28	(Russia)	DF	Yevgeni Chernov	5	0	0	0	5	0
31	(Russia)	MF	Aleksandr Makarov	3	1	0	0	3	1
33	(Russia)	FW	Pavel Pogrebnyak	1	0	0	0	1	0
64	(Russia)	DF	Denis Kutin	1	0	1	0	2	0
77	(Serbia)	MF	Nikola Trujić	1	0	0	0	1	0
88	(Serbia)	MF	Marko Poletanović	3	0	0	0	3	0
91	(Russia)	MF	Yan Kazayev	2	0	0	0	2	0
Players who left Tosno during the season:
17	(Russia)	FW	Anton Zabolotny	4	0	0	0	4	0
18	(Montenegro)	MF	Mladen Kašćelan	1	0	0	0	1	0
20	(Russia)	FW	Yevgeni Markov	3	0	0	0	3	0
			TOTALS	65	4	11	0	76	4
