= 2017–18 FC Spartak Moscow season =

Spartak Moscow
2017–18 season
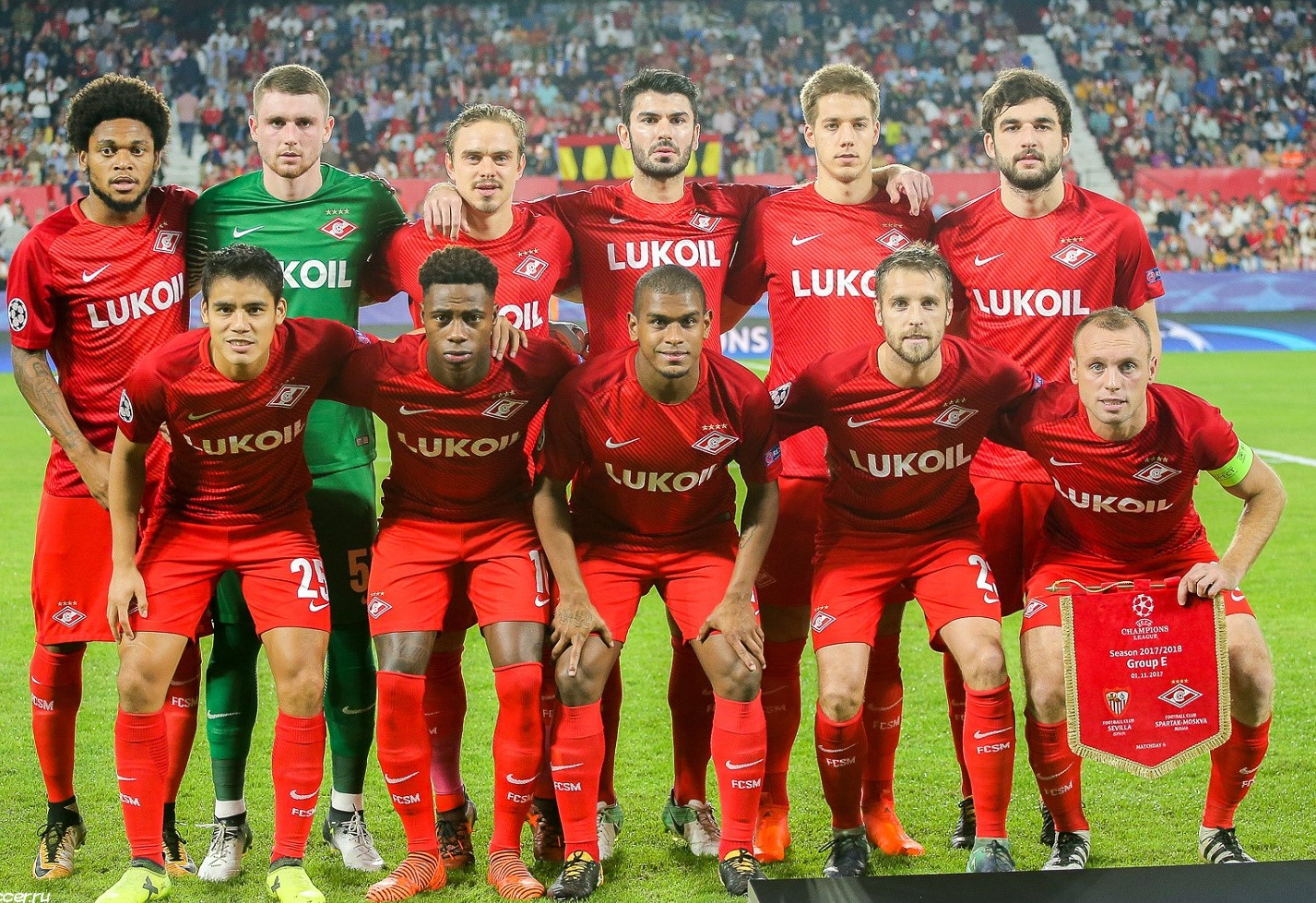
- Chairman: Sergey Rodionov
- Manager: Massimo Carrera
- Stadium: Otkrytiye Arena
- Premier League: 3rd
- Russian Cup: Semi-final
- Russian Super Cup: Winners
- Champions League: Group stage
- Europa League: Round of 32
- Top goalscorer: League: Quincy Promes (15); All: Quincy Promes (21)
Home colours	Away colours

The 2017–18 Spartak Moscow season was the twenty-sixth successive season that the club played in the Russian Premier League, the highest tier of association football in Russia. Domestically Spartak Moscow were defending Premier League Champions, failing to defend their title and eventually finishing third, winning the Russian Super Cup and reached the semi-final of the Russian Cup where they were defeated by eventual winners FC Tosno. In Europe Spartak Moscow finished third in their UEFA Champions League group behind Liverpool and Sevilla, transferring to the UEFA Europa League where they were knocked out at the Round of 32 stage by Athletic Bilbao.

== Squad ==
As of match played 13 May 2018

No.	Name	Nationality	Position	Date of birth (age)	Signed from	Signed in	Contract ends	Apps.	Goals	Notes
Goalkeepers
32	Artyom Rebrov	(Russia)	GK	4 March 1984 (aged 34)	Shinnik Yaroslavl	2011		123	0	Vice Captain
56	Vadim Averkiyev	(Russia)	GK	1 June 1997 (aged 20)	Youth Team	2013		0	0	
57	Aleksandr Selikhov	(Russia)	GK	7 April 1994 (aged 24)	Amkar Perm	2016		31	0	
95	Vladislav Teryoshkin	(Russia)	GK	16 July 1995 (aged 22)	Youth Team	2012		0	0	
98	Aleksandr Maksimenko	(Russia)	GK	23 February 1998 (aged 20)	Youth Team	2014		1	0	
Defenders
3	Marko Petković	(Serbia)	DF	3 September 1992 (aged 25)	Red Star Belgrade	2017		10	0	
5	Serdar Tasci	(Germany)	DF	24 April 1987 (aged 31)	VfB Stuttgart	2013		84	3	
14	Georgi Dzhikiya	(Russia)	DF	21 November 1993 (aged 24)	Amkar Perm	2016		33	0	
16	Salvatore Bocchetti	(Italy)	DF	30 November 1986 (aged 31)	Rubin Kazan	2013		92	5	
17	Georgi Tigiyev	(Russia)	DF	20 June 1995 (aged 22)	Anzhi Makhachkala	2017		7	0	
22	Konstantin Shcherbakov	(Russia)	DF	20 March 1997 (aged 21)	Youth team	2013		0	0	
23	Dmitri Kombarov	(Russia)	DF	22 January 1987 (aged 31)	Dynamo Moscow	2010		255	25	Vice Captain
26	Leonid Mironov	(Russia)	DF	14 September 1998 (aged 19)	Youth team	2015		0	0	
29	Ilya Kutepov	(Russia)	DF	29 July 1993 (aged 24)	Akademiya Tolyatti	2012		64	2	
31	Oleg Krasilnichenko	(Russia)	DF	21 January 1997 (aged 21)	Youth team	2014		0	0	
33	Nikola Maksimović	(Serbia)	DF	25 November 1991 (aged 26)	loan from Napoli	2018		11	0	
34	Turgay Mokhbaliyev	(Russia)	DF	18 January 2000 (aged 18)	Youth team	2016		0	0	
38	Andrey Yeshchenko	(Russia)	DF	9 February 1984 (aged 34)	Anzhi Makhachkala	2016		61	1	
44	Aleksandr Likhachyov	(Russia)	DF	22 July 1996 (aged 21)	Youth team	2012		0	0	
46	Artyom Mamin	(Russia)	DF	25 July 1997 (aged 20)	Youth team	2014		1	0	
59	Audrey Yola Zepatta	(Cameroon)	DF	17 February 1999 (aged 19)	Universal Stars	2016		0	0	
63	Shamsiddin Shanbiyev	(Russia)	DF	18 February 1997 (aged 21)	Youth team	2016		0	0	
68	Daniil Petrunin	(Russia)	DF	10 June 1999 (aged 18)	Youth team	2015		0	0	
78	Pavel Lelyukhin	(Russia)	DF	23 April 1998 (aged 20)	Loan from Dynamo Moscow	2017	2018	0	0	
92	Nikolai Rasskazov	(Russia)	DF	4 January 1998 (aged 20)	Youth team	2015		0	0	
93	Artyom Sokol	(Russia)	DF	11 June 1997 (aged 20)	Youth team	2014		0	0	
94	Ivan Khomukha	(Russia)	DF	14 July 1994 (aged 23)	Youth Team	2010		0	0	
96	Maksim Aktisov	(Russia)	DF	28 January 2000 (aged 18)	Youth team	2016		0	0	
Midfielders
4	Nikolai Tyunin	(Russia)	MF	6 January 1987 (aged 31)	Khimki	2018		1	0	
7	Jano Ananidze	(Georgia (country))	MF	10 October 1992 (aged 25)	Youth Team	2009		134	16	Vice Captain
8	Denis Glushakov	(Russia)	MF	27 January 1987 (aged 31)	Lokomotiv Moscow	2013		147	20	Club Captain
10	Quincy Promes	(Netherlands)	MF	4 January 1992 (aged 26)	Twente	2014		129	65	
11	Fernando	(Brazil)	MF	3 March 1992 (aged 26)	Sampdoria	2016		68	8	
18	Zelimkhan Bakayev	(Russia)	MF	1 July 1996 (aged 21)	Youth team	2013		7	0	
19	Aleksandr Samedov	(Russia)	MF	19 July 1984 (aged 33)	Lokomotiv Moscow	2017		96	15	
20	Igor Leontyev	(Russia)	MF	18 March 1994 (aged 24)	Your team	2011		6	0	
25	Lorenzo Melgarejo	(Paraguay)	MF	10 August 1990 (aged 27)	Kuban Krasnodar	2016		65	11	
27	Aleksandr Lomovitsky	(Russia)	MF	27 January 1998 (aged 20)	Youth team	2015		0	0	
28	Yegor Rudkovsky	(Russia)	MF	4 March 1996 (aged 22)	Chertanovo Moscow	2016		0	0	
30	Sofiane Hanni	(Algeria)	MF	4 March 1996 (aged 22)	Anderlecht	2018		11	2	
40	Artyom Timofeyev	(Russia)	MF	12 January 1994 (aged 24)	Your team	2012		17	0	
43	Pyotr Volodkin	(Russia)	MF	4 March 1999 (aged 19)	Youth team	2015		0	0	
45	Sergei Eremenko	(Finland)	MF	6 January 1999 (aged 19)	Loan from Spartaks Jūrmala	2018		0	0	
47	Roman Zobnin	(Russia)	MF	11 February 1994 (aged 24)	Dynamo Moscow	2016		52	2	
50	Mario Pašalić	(Croatia)	MF	9 February 1995 (aged 23)	Loan from Chelsea	2017	2018	32	5	
75	Mikhail Ignatov	(Russia)	MF	4 May 2000 (aged 18)	Youth team	2016		0	0	
82	Ilya Mazurov	(Russia)	MF	7 June 1999 (aged 18)	Youth team	2015		0	0	
83	Vladislav Panteleyev	(Russia)	MF	15 August 1996 (aged 21)	Youth team	2012		0	0	
87	Soltmurad Bakayev	(Russia)	MF	5 August 1999 (aged 18)	Youth team	2015		1	0	
88	Danil Poluboyarinov	(Russia)	MF	4 February 1997 (aged 21)	Youth team	2014		0	0	
Forwards
9	Zé Luís	(Cape Verde)	FW	24 January 1991 (aged 27)	Braga	2015		72	21	
12	Luiz Adriano	(Brazil)	FW	12 April 1987 (aged 31)	A.C. Milan	2016		46	17	
49	Idrisa Sambú	(Portugal)	FW	27 March 1998 (aged 20)	Porto B	2016		0	0	
60	Fashion Sakala	(Zambia)	FW	14 March 1997 (aged 21)	Zanaco	2016		0	0	
61	Danila Proshlyakov	(Russia)	FW	8 March 2000 (aged 18)	Youth team	2016		0	0	
66	Sylvanus Nimely	(Liberia)	FW	4 April 1998 (aged 20)	MFK Karviná	2016		0	0	
69	Denis Davydov	(Russia)	FW	22 March 1995 (aged 23)	Youth team	2012		37	1	
70	Yegor Nikulin	(Russia)	FW	16 January 1997 (aged 21)	U.D. Leiria	2016		0	0	
79	Aleksandr Rudenko	(Russia)	FW	15 March 1999 (aged 19)	Youth team	2015		0	0	
81	Daniil Lopatin	(Russia)	FW	20 December 2000 (aged 17)	Youth team	2016		0	0	
99	Pedro Rocha	(Brazil)	FW	1 October 1994 (aged 23)	Grêmio	2017		14	1	
Away on loan
17	Aleksandr Zuyev	(Russia)	MF	26 June 1996 (aged 21)	Youth team	2013		27	0	
37	Georgi Melkadze	(Russia)	MF	4 April 1997 (aged 21)	Youth team	2014		8	0	
64	Denis Kutin	(Russia)	DF	5 October 1993 (aged 24)	Youth Team	2010		6	0	
71	Ivelin Popov	(Bulgaria)	MF	26 October 1987 (aged 30)	Kuban Krasnodar	2015		76	8	
73	Ayaz Guliyev	(Russia)	MF	27 November 1996 (aged 21)	Youth team	2012		0	0	
84	Boris Tsygankov	(Russia)	MF	17 April 1998 (aged 20)	Youth team	2015		0	0	
Players that left Spartak Moscow during the season
21	Artyom Samsonov	(Russia)	MF	5 January 1994 (aged 24)	Your team	2011		3	0	
48	Kirill Feofilaktov	(Russia)	DF	10 April 1998 (aged 20)	Youth team	2015		0	0	

=== Out on loan ===
Note: Flags indicate national team as defined under FIFA eligibility rules; some limited exceptions apply. Players may hold more than one non-FIFA nationality.

No.	Pos.	Nation	Player
17	MF	RUS	Aleksandr Zuyev (at Rostov)
37	MF	RUS	Georgi Melkadze (at Tosno)
64	DF	RUS	Denis Kutin (at Tosno)

No.	Pos.	Nation	Player
71	MF	BUL	Ivelin Popov (at Rubin Kazan)
73	MF	RUS	Ayaz Guliyev (at Rostov)
84	MF	RUS	Boris Tsygankov (at Torpedo Minsk)

=== Left club during season ===
Note: Flags indicate national team as defined under FIFA eligibility rules; some limited exceptions apply. Players may hold more than one non-FIFA nationality.

No. / Pos. / Nation / Player; 21 / MF / RUS / Artyom Samsonov (at SKA-Khabarovsk)	No. / Pos. / Nation / Player; 48 / DF / RUS / Kirill Feofilaktov

== Transfers ==
=== In ===
Date	Position	Nationality	Name	From	Fee	Ref.
13 June 2017	MF	(Russia)	Georgi Tigiyev	Anzhi Makhachkala	Undisclosed	
1 July 2017	DF	(Serbia)	Marko Petković	Red Star Belgrade	Undisclosed	
31 August 2017	FW	(Brazil)	Pedro Rocha	Grêmio	Undisclosed	
29 December 2017	MF	(Russia)	Nikolai Tyunin	Khimki	Undisclosed	
31 January 2018	MF	(Algeria)	Sofiane Hanni	Anderlecht	Undisclosed	

=== Loans in ===
Date from	Position	Nationality	Name	From	Date to	Ref.
Summer 2017	MF	(Russia)	Pavel Lelyukhin	Dynamo-2 Moscow	End of Season	
2 August 2017	MF	(Croatia)	Mario Pašalić	Chelsea	End of Season	
26 January 2018	DF	(Serbia)	Nikola Maksimović	Napoli	End of Season	
5 February 2018	MF	(Finland)	Sergei Eremenko	Spartaks Jūrmala	31 December 2018	

=== Out ===
Date	Position	Nationality	Name	To	Fee	Ref.
10 January 2018	MF	(Russia)	Artyom Samsonov	SKA-Khabarovsk	Undisclosed	

=== Loans out ===
Date from	Position	Nationality	Name	To	Date to	Ref.
5 June 2017	MF	(Russia)	Georgi Melkadze	Tosno	End of Season	
23 June 2017	MF	(Russia)	Aleksandr Zuyev	Rostov	End of Season	
27 June 2017	DF	(Russia)	Denis Kutin	Tosno	End of Season	
13 July 2017	MF	(Russia)	Ayaz Guliyev	Anzhi Makhachkala	7 January 2018	
12 February 2018	MF	(Bulgaria)	Ivelin Popov	Rubin Kazan	End of Season	
10 January 2018	MF	(Russia)	Ayaz Guliyev	Rostov	End of Season	

=== Released ===
Date	Position	Nationality	Name	Joined	Date
9 June 2017	GK	(Russia)	Sergei Pesyakov	Rostov	9 June 2017
9 June 2017	MF	(Japan)	Ippei Shinozuka	Yokohama F. Marinos	
9 June 2017	MF	(Russia)	Konstantin Savichev	SKA-Khabarovsk	28 June 2017
9 June 2017	FW	(Russia)	Artyom Fedchuk	Avangard Kursk	22 June 2017
13 June 2017	DF	(Russia)	Yevgeni Makeyev	Rostov	19 June 2017

== Competitions ==
=== Super Cup ===
14 July 2017	Spartak Moscow	2 – 1 (a.e.t.)	Lokomotiv Moscow	Moscow
21:30 MSK (UTC+3)	L. Adriano (yellow card) 62' (goal) 101'; Yeshchenko (yellow card) 80'; Dzhikiya (yellow card) 95'; Promes 113'; Bocchetti (yellow card) 115'	Report	Pejčinović (yellow card) 42'; Barinov (yellow card) 76'; Fernandes 116'	Stadium: Lokomotiv Stadium; Attendance: 24,444; Referee: Vladislav Bezborodov

=== Russian Premier League ===
==== Results by round ====
Round	1	2	3	4	5	6	7	8	9	10	11	12	13	14	15	16	17	18	19	20	21	22	23	24	25	26	27	28	29	30
Ground	A	A	H	A	H	A	H	A	H	A	H	H	A	H	A	H	A	H	A	H	A	H	A	H	A	A	H	A	H	H
Result	D	D	W	L	W	L	L	D	W	D	D	W	W	D	D	W	W	W	W	W	D	W	W	W	W	L	L	W	W	L
Position	7	10	7	10	8	9	11	9	8	8	8	5	5	5	6	5	4	4	4	3	3	2	2	2	2	2	3	2	2	3

Updated to match(es) played on 13 May 2018. Source: See Results
A = Away; H = Home; W = Win; D = Draw; L = Loss

==== Matches ====
18 July 2017 1	Dynamo Moscow	2 – 2	Spartak Moscow	Moscow
19:30 MSK (UTC+3)	Bećiraj (yellow card) 41'; Panchenko 54'; Tashayev 90+2'	Report	Promes 29'; Adriano 32'; Popov (yellow card) 72'	Stadium: Arena Khimki; Attendance: 17,133; Referee: Sergei Karasev

23 July 2017 2	Ufa	0 – 0	Spartak Moscow	Ufa
15:00 MSK (UTC+3)	Tabidze (yellow card) 80'	Report	Kombarov (yellow card) 77'	Stadium: Neftyanik Stadium; Attendance: 12,571; Referee: Aleksey Sukhoy

31 July 2017 3	Spartak Moscow	2 – 0	Krasnodar	Moscow
19:30 MSK (UTC+3)	Promes 38' (pen.); Fernando 45+1'	Report	Gritsayenko (yellow card) 36'	Stadium: Otkrytiye Arena; Attendance: 34,208; Referee: Sergey Aleksei Gritsayenko

6 August 2017 4	Zenit St.Petersburg	5 – 1	Spartak Moscow	Saint Petersburg
20:00 MSK (UTC+3)	Kokorin 36'; Paredes (yellow card) 40'; Yerokhin 45'; Criscito 57' Kuzyayev 63'; Rebrov 77' (o.g.); Smolnikov (red card) 90+2'; Terentyev (yellow card) 90+3'	Report	Dzhikiya (yellow card) 27'; Glushakov (yellow card) 34'; Kombarov (yellow card) 45+1'; Promes 71' (pen.); Fernando (yellow card) 89'; Adriano (red card) 90+2'	Stadium: Krestovsky Stadium; Attendance: 53,359; Referee: Mikhail Vilkov

9 August 2017 5	Spartak Moscow	2 – 0	Arsenal Tula	Moscow
19:30 MSK (UTC+3)	Promes 20'; Tigiyev (yellow card) 24'; Samedov (yellow card) 64'; Zé Luís 84'	Report	Álvarez (yellow card) 45+2'; Denisov (yellow card) 75'; Belyayev (yellow card) 90+2'	Stadium: Otkrytiye Arena; Attendance: 26,183; Referee: Sergey Kulikov

12 August 2017 6	CSKA Moscow	2 – 1	Spartak Moscow	Moscow
17:30 MSK (UTC+3)	Shchennikov 83'; Vitinho 84' (yellow card) 85'; Golovin (yellow card) 84'; Fernandes (yellow card) 90+6'; Wernbloom (yellow card) 90+6'	Report	Pašalić 48'; Dzhikiya (yellow card) 90+5'; Promes (yellow card) 90+5'	Stadium: VEB Arena; Attendance: 24,000; Referee: Vladimir Seldyakov

19 August 2017 7	Spartak Moscow	3 – 4	Lokomotiv Moscow	Moscow
17:30 MSK (UTC+3)	Samedov (yellow card) 27' (yellow-red card) 45+1'; Glushakov 30'; Adriano 43'; Promes 90+2'	Report	Barinov 48'; Al.Miranchuk (yellow card) 59' (goal) 68'; Fernandes (yellow card) 63' (goal) 90+1'; Ignatyev (yellow card) 72'; Kolomeytsev 83'	Stadium: Otkrytiye Arena; Attendance: 33,027; Referee: Aleksei Eskov

27 August 2017 8	SKA-Khabarovsk	0 – 0	Spartak Moscow	Khabarovsk
11:00 MSK (UTC+3)	Koryan (yellow card) 56'; Putsko (yellow card) 79'; Nikiforov (yellow card) 84'; Navalovski (yellow card) 88'; Dovbnya (yellow card) 90+4'	Report	Bocchetti (yellow card) 56'	Stadium: Lenin Stadium; Attendance: 14,524; Referee: Roman Galimov

9 September 2017 9	Spartak Moscow	1 – 0	Rubin Kazan	Moscow
19:00 MSK (UTC+3)	Promes (yellow card) 17' (goal) 48'; Popov (yellow card) 20'; Yeshchenko (yellow card) 39'; Kutepov (yellow card) 73'	Report	Sigurðsson (yellow card) 34'	Stadium: Otkrytiye Arena; Attendance: 28,781; Referee: Sergey Lapochkin

17 September 2017 10	Tosno	2 – 2	Spartak Moscow	Saint Petersburg
13:00 MSK (UTC+3)	Shakhov (red card) 29'; Markov 86'; Zabolotny 90'	Report	Luiz Adriano (yellow card) 18'; Dzhikiya 35'; Pašalić 63'; Samedov (yellow card) 67'; Promes (yellow card) 69'; Petković (yellow card) 77'	Stadium: Petrovsky Stadium; Attendance: 13,665; Referee: Vladmimir Seldyakov

23 September 2017 11	Spartak Moscow	2 – 2	Anzhi Makhachkala	Moscow
19:00 MSK (UTC+3)	Luiz Adriano 14' (pen.); Dzhikiya (yellow card) 84'; Melgarejo 90+2'	Report	Poluyakhtov (yellow card) 55'; Samardžić 74'; Katsayev 78'	Stadium: Otkrytiye Arena; Attendance: 25,075; Referee: Vitali Meshkov

30 September 2017 12	Spartak Moscow	2 – 0	Ural Yekaterinburg	Moscow
19:00 MSK (UTC+3)	Samedov 36'; Rocha 51'	Report	Boumal (yellow card) 22'; Balažic (yellow card) 31' (yellow-red card) 74'; Haroyan (yellow card) 67'	Stadium: Otkrytiye Arena; Attendance: 21,089; Referee: Vladislav Bezborodov

13 October 2017 13	Akhmat Grozny	1 – 2	Spartak Moscow	Grozny
19:30 MSK (UTC+3)	Jabá (yellow card) 35'; Semyonov (yellow card) 39'; Rodolfo 70' (pen.)	Report	Glushakov 30'; Yeshchenko (yellow card) 50'; Melgarejo 72'; Selikhov (yellow card) 77'	Stadium: Akhmat-Arena; Attendance: 18,177; Referee: Sergey Lapochkin

21 October 2017 14	Spartak Moscow	0 – 0	Amkar Perm	Moscow
19:00 MSK (UTC+3)		Report	Gashchenkov (yellow card) 65'; Idowu (yellow card) 85'	Stadium: Otkrytiye Arena; Attendance: 25,754; Referee: Pavel Kukuyan

28 October 2017 15	Rostov	2 – 2	Spartak Moscow	Rostov-on-Don
19:00 MSK (UTC+3)	Ionov 20'; Bukharov (yellow card) 76'; Wilusz 87'	Report	Fernando 31'; Glushakov 34'; Tasci (yellow card) 65'	Stadium: Olimp-2; Attendance: 9,820; Referee: Roman Galimov

5 November 2017 16	Spartak Moscow	3 – 1	Ufa	Moscow
19:00 MSK (UTC+3)	Fernando 37'; Luiz Adriano (yellow card) 51' (goal) 79'; Promes 63'	Report	Sly 10' (yellow card) 51'; Paurević (yellow card) 47'	Stadium: Otkrytiye Arena; Attendance: 21,445; Referee: Artem Chistyakov

18 November 2017 17	Krasnodar	1 – 4	Spartak Moscow	Krasnodar
16:30 MSK (UTC+3)	Shishkin (yellow card) 58'; Petrov (yellow card) 60'; Claesson 88'	Report	Luiz Adriano 8', 86'; Zé Luís 28'; Pašalić (yellow card) 78'; Promes 90'	Stadium: Krasnodar Stadium; Attendance: 33,979; Referee: Sergey Lapochkin

27 November 2017 18	Spartak Moscow	3 – 1	Zenit St.Petersburg	Moscow
19:30 MSK (UTC+3)	Samedov 19' (yellow card) 24'; Luiz Adriano 30'; Glushakov (yellow card) 45'; Zobnin (yellow card) 68'; Fernando (yellow card) 79' (yellow-red card) 85'; Zé Luís (yellow card) 82'; Bocchetti (yellow card) 90+7'; Pašalić 90+8'	Report	Paredes (yellow card) 24'; Criscito 35'; Rigoni (yellow card) 81'	Stadium: Otkrytiye Arena; Attendance: 41,141; Referee: Vitaly Meshkov

1 December 2017 19	Arsenal Tula	0 – 1	Spartak Moscow	Tula
19:30 MSK (UTC+3)	Grigalava (yellow card) 17'; Đorđević (yellow card) 67'	Report	Kutepov (yellow card) 40'; Glushakov (yellow card) 79' (goal) 90'	Stadium: Arsenal Stadium; Attendance: 14,690; Referee: Vladislav Bezborodov

10 December 2017 20	Spartak Moscow	3 – 0	CSKA Moscow	Moscow
16:30 MSK (UTC+3)	Promes 10', 61'; Pašalić 90+8'	Report	Golovin (yellow card) 77'; Wernbloom (yellow card) 86'; Nababkin (yellow card) 90'; V.Berezutski (yellow card) 90+2'	Stadium: Otkrytiye Arena; Attendance: 44,062; Referee: Alexey Nikolaev

4 March 2018 21	Lokomotiv Moscow	0 – 0	Spartak Moscow	Moscow
16:30 MSK (UTC+3)	Fernandes (yellow card) 40'	Report	Yeshchenko (yellow card) 22'; Maksimović (yellow card) 25'; Zobnin (yellow card) 70'; Kombarov (yellow card) 76'; Kutepov (yellow card) 81'	Stadium: RZD Arena; Attendance: 21,750; Referee: Mikhail Vilkov

11 March 2018 22	Spartak Moscow	1 – 0	SKA-Khabarovsk	Moscow
19:00 MSK (UTC+3)	Promes (yellow card) 27' (penalty missed) 29'; Fernando 90' (yellow card) 90+1'	Report	Samsonov (yellow card) 21'	Stadium: Spartak Stadium; Attendance: 21,779; Referee: Kirill Levnikov

17 March 2018 23	Rubin Kazan	1 – 2	Spartak Moscow	Kazan
19:00 MSK (UTC+3)	Kudryashov (yellow card) 23'; Granat (yellow card) 48'; Noboa 61'	Report	Maksimović (yellow card) 9'; Hanni 18'; Fernando (yellow card) 60'; Luiz Adriano 81'	Stadium: Kazan Arena; Attendance: 14,239; Referee: Vladislav Bezborodov

31 March 2018 24	Spartak Moscow	2 – 1	Tosno	Moscow
19:00 MSK (UTC+3)	Fernando (yellow card) 32' (goal) 45+1'; Luiz Adriano (yellow card) 40' (goal) 75'	Report	Sukharev (yellow card) 45'; Pogrebnyak 80' (pen.)	Stadium: Spartak Stadium; Attendance: 28,517; Referee: Vitaly Meshkov

8 April 2018 25	Anzhi Makhachkala	1 – 4	Spartak Moscow	Kaspiysk
19:00 MSK (UTC+3)	Lescano 36'	Report	Promes 10', 14', 27' (pen.); Kutepov 56'	Stadium: Anzhi Arena; Attendance: 7,764; Referee: Sergey Lapochkin

15 April 2018 26	Ural Yekaterinburg	2 – 1	Spartak Moscow	Yekaterinburg
14:00 MSK (UTC+3)	Bicfalvi 37'; Portnyagin (yellow card) 86'; El Kabir 88'	Report	Zé Luís (yellow card) 19'; Kutepov (yellow card) 74'; Promes 90+1'	Stadium: Central Stadium; Attendance: 26,868; Referee: Vladislav Bezborodov

23 April 2018 27	Spartak Moscow	1 – 3	Akhmat Grozny	Moscow
19:30 MSK (UTC+3)	Bocchetti (yellow card) 29'; Luiz Adriano (yellow card) 39' (goal) 86'	Report	Mitrishev 11'; Ismael 23'; Ángel (yellow card) 39'; Berisha 50'; Utsiyev (yellow card) 64'; Pliyev (yellow card) 69'	Stadium: Spartak Stadium; Attendance: 23,849; Referee: Mikhail Vilkov

29 April 2018 28	Amkar Perm	0 – 2	Spartak Moscow	Perm
14:00 MSK (UTC+3)	Komolov (yellow card) 31'; Ezatolahi (yellow card) 42'; Sivakow (yellow card) 43'	Report	Bocchetti 8' (yellow card) 31'; Timofeyev (yellow card) 28'; Hanni 81'	Stadium: Zvezda Stadium; Attendance: 7,890; Referee: Kirill Levnikov

5 May 2018 29	Spartak Moscow	2 – 0	Rostov	Moscow
19:00 MSK (UTC+3)	Yeshchenko (yellow card) 73'; Melgarejo 79' (yellow card) 80'; Promes 84'	Report	Bayramyan (yellow card) 26' (yellow-red card) 90+3'; Abayev (yellow card) 38'; Skopintsev (yellow card) 57'	Stadium: Spartak Stadium; Attendance: 35,802; Referee: Sergey Lapochkin

13 May 2018 30	Spartak Moscow	0 – 1	Dynamo Moscow	Moscow
14:00 MSK (UTC+3)	Kutepov (yellow card) 34'; Rebrov (yellow card) 90+5'	Report	Rykov (yellow card) 8'; Kozlov (yellow card) 8'; Lutsenko 35' (pen.); Markov (yellow card) 90+4'; Tashayev (yellow card) 90+5'	Stadium: Spartak Stadium; Attendance: 42,124; Referee: Sergey Karasev

==== League table ====
Pos	Team	Pld	W	D	L	GF	GA	GD	Pts	Qualification or relegation
1	Lokomotiv Moscow (C)	30	18	6	6	41	21	+20	60	Qualification for the Champions League group stage
2	CSKA Moscow	30	17	7	6	49	23	+26	58	Qualification for the Champions League group stage
3	Spartak Moscow	30	16	8	6	51	32	+19	56	Qualification for the Champions League third qualifying round
4	Krasnodar	30	16	6	8	46	30	+16	54	Qualification for the Europa League group stage (Note: Tosno qualified for the Europa League group stage by winning the 2017–18 Russian Cup. However, since they failed to obtain a UEFA licence, the spot awarded to the cup winners was passed to fourth-placed team, the spot awarded to the fourth-placed team was passed to fifth-placed team, and the spot awarded to the fifth-placed team was passed to sixth-placed team.)
5	Zenit Saint Petersburg	30	14	11	5	46	21	+25	53	Qualification for the Europa League third qualifying round

Updated to match(es) played on 13 May 2018. Source: Russian Premier League, Soccerway
Rules for classification: 1) Points; 2) Head-to-head points; 3) Head-to-head matches won; 4) Head-to-head goal difference; 5) Head-to-head goals scored; 6) Head-to-head away goals; 7) Matches won; 8) Goal difference; 9) Goals scored; 10) Away goals scored.
(C) Champions

=== Russian Cup ===
20 September 2017 Round of 32	Kuban Krasnodar	0 – 2	Spartak Moscow	Krasnodar
19:00 MSK (UTC+3)	Markov (yellow card) 51'; Zavezyon (yellow card) 84'	Report	Promes 45+1', 52'	Stadium: Kuban Stadium; Attendance: 12,728; Referee: Evgeny Turbin

25 October 2017 Round of 16	Spartak Moscow	5 – 2	Spartak Nalchik	Moscow
19:00 MSK (UTC+3)	Pašalić 30'; Melgarejo 48', 52'; Kombarov (yellow card) 58'; Promes (yellow card) 68'; Zhilov 81' (o.g.); Kutepov 89'	Report	Mednikov (yellow card) 17' (goal) 19'; Guguyev 58'; Musluyev (yellow card) 68'	Stadium: Otkrytiye Arena; Attendance: 16,552; Referee: Nikolay Voloshin

4 April 2018 Quarterfinal	Krylia Sovetov	1 – 3	Spartak Moscow	Samara
17:30 MSK (UTC+3)	Lanin (yellow card) 16'; Sobolev 90+2'	Report	Zé Luís 20'; Promes 71'; Luiz Adriano 77'	Stadium: Metallurg Stadium; Attendance: 15,833; Referee: Vladimir Moskalyov
Note: Match originally scheduled 28 February 2018, but postponed due to adverse weather conditions.

18 April 2018 Semifinal	Spartak Moscow	1 – 1 (a.e.t.) (4 – 5 p)	Tosno	Moscow
18:30 MSK (UTC+3)	Zobnin (yellow card) 35'; Zé Luís 62'	Report	Dugalić (yellow card) 4'; Buivolov (yellow card) 80'; Galiulin 88'; Nuno Rocha (yellow card) 108'; Paliyenko (yellow card) 119'; Yurchenko (yellow card) 120+1'	Stadium: Otkrytiye Arena; Attendance: 22,335; Referee: Roman Galimov
	Penalties
	Luiz Adriano (penalty scored); D. Kombarov (penalty scored); Fernando (penalty missed); Zé Luís (penalty scored); Promes (penalty scored); Glushakov (penalty missed)		Dugalić (penalty missed); Galiulin (penalty scored); Trujić (penalty scored); Zhigulyov (penalty scored); Buivolov (penalty scored); Nuno Rocha (penalty scored)

=== UEFA Champions League ===
==== Group stage ====
Pos	Team	Pld	W	D	L	GF	GA	GD	Pts	Qualification	LIV	SEV	SPM	MRB
1	(England) Liverpool	6	3	3	0	23	6	+17	12	Advance to knockout phase	—	2–2	7–0	3–0
2	(Spain) Sevilla	6	2	3	1	12	12	0	9	Advance to knockout phase	3–3	—	2–1	3–0
3	(Russia) Spartak Moscow	6	1	3	2	9	13	−4	6	Transfer to Europa League	1–1	5–1	—	1–1
4	(Slovenia) Maribor	6	0	3	3	3	16	−13	3		0–7	1–1	1–1	—

Source: UEFA

13 September 2017 1	Maribor (Slovenia)	1 – 1	(Russia) Spartak Moscow	Maribor, Slovenia
21:45 MSK (UTC+3)	Bohar 85'	Report	Dzhikiya (yellow card) 36'; Samedov 59'	Stadium: Ljudski vrt Attendance: 12,566; Referee: Deniz Aytekin (Germany)

26 September 2017 2	Spartak Moscow (Russia)	1 – 1	(England) Liverpool	Moscow, Russia
21:45 MSK (UTC+3)	Fernando 23'; Bocchetti (yellow card) 46'	Report	Can (yellow card) 7'; Coutinho 31'; Firmino (yellow card) 75'	Stadium: Otkrytiye Arena; Attendance: 43,376; Referee: Clément Turpin (France)

17 October 2017 3	Spartak Moscow (Russia)	5 – 1	(Spain) Sevilla	Moscow, Russia
21:45 MSK (UTC+3)	Promes 18', 90' Dzhikiya (yellow card) 34' Fernando (yellow card) 45' Melgarejo 58' Glushakov 67' Luiz Adriano 74'	Report	Kjær 30'; Escudero (yellow card) 37'; Pizarro (yellow card) 89'	Stadium: Otkrytiye Arena; Attendance: 44,307; Referee: Gianluca Rocchi (Italy)

1 November 2017 4	Sevilla (Spain)	2 – 1	(Russia) Spartak Moscow	Seville, Spain
22:45 MSK (UTC+3)	Lenglet 30'; Banega 59'; Ben Yedder (yellow card) 90+1'	Report	Glushakov (yellow card) 32'; Tasci (yellow card) 61'; Zé Luís 78'; Dzhikiya (yellow card) 86'	Stadium: Ramón Sánchez Pizjuán; Attendance: 38,002; Referee: Artur Soares Dias (Portugal)

21 November 2017 5	Spartak Moscow (Russia)	1 – 1	(Slovenia) Maribor	Moscow, Russia
20:00 MSK (UTC+3)	Popov (yellow card) 49'; Luiz Adriano (yellow card) 51'; Kutepov (yellow card) 62'; Zé Luís 82'	Report	Vrhovec (yellow card) 23'; Mešanović 90+2'	Stadium: Otkrytiye Arena; Attendance: 42,920; Referee: Willie Collum (Scotland)

6 December 2017 6	Liverpool (England)	7 – 0	(Russia) Spartak Moscow	Liverpool, England
22:45 MSK (UTC+3)	Coutinho 4' (pen.), 15', 50'; Can (yellow card) 6'; Firmino 18'; Mané 47', 76'; Salah 86'	Report	Dzhikiya (yellow card) 14'; Fernando (yellow card) 62'	Stadium: Anfield; Attendance: 48,779; Referee: Szymon Marciniak (Poland)

=== UEFA Europa League ===
==== Knockout phase ====
15 February 2018 Round of 32 1st leg	Spartak Moscow (Russia)	1 – 3	(Spain) Athletic Bilbao	Moscow, Russia
21:00 MSK (UTC+3)	Kutepov (yellow card) 37'; Zobnin (yellow card) 55'; Luiz Adriano 60' (yellow card) 68'	Report	Raúl García (yellow card) 15'; Aduriz 22', 39'; Kutepov 45+1' (o.g.); Etxeita (yellow card) 56'	Stadium: Otkrytiye Arena; Attendance: 43,145; Referee: Benoît Bastien (France)

22 February 2018 Round of 32 2nd leg	Athletic Bilbao (Spain)	1 – 2 (5 – 3 agg.)	(Russia) Spartak Moscow	Bilbao, Spain
23:05 MSK (UTC+3)	Etxeita 57'; José (yellow card) 86'; Aduriz (yellow card) 90+3'	Report	Bocchetti (yellow card) 31'; Luiz Adriano 44'; Yeshchenko (yellow card) 67'; Glushakov (yellow card) 80'; Melgarejo 85'; Kombarov (yellow card) 90+4'	Stadium: San Mamés Stadium; Referee: Tobias Stieler (Germany)

== Squad statistics ==
As of match played 13 May 2018

=== Appearances and goals ===
No.	Pos	Nat	Player	Total		Premier League		Russian Cup		Super Cup		Champions League		Europa League	
No.	Pos	Nat	Player	Apps	Goals	Apps	Goals	Apps	Goals	Apps	Goals	Apps	Goals	Apps	Goals
3	DF	(Serbia) SRB	Marko Petković	10	0	7	0	1	0	0	0	1+1	0	0	0
5	DF	(Germany) GER	Serdar Tasci	22	0	14	0	1	0	0	0	5	0	2	0
7	MF	(Georgia (country)) GEO	Jano Ananidze	8	0	3+3	0	1	0	0+1	0	0	0	0	0
8	MF	(Russia) RUS	Denis Glushakov	33	5	20+2	4	2+1	0	1	0	4+1	1	2	0
9	FW	(Cape Verde) CPV	Zé Luís	24	6	12+4	2	1+1	2	1	0	2+1	2	0+2	0
10	FW	(Netherlands) NED	Quincy Promes	38	21	25+1	15	3+1	3	1	1	5	2	2	0
11	MF	(Brazil) BRA	Fernando	38	5	23+4	4	2+1	0	1	0	6	1	1	0
12	FW	(Brazil) BRA	Luiz Adriano	38	15	25	10	4	1	1	1	6	1	2	2
14	DF	(Russia) RUS	Georgi Dzhikiya	25	0	16+1	0	1+1	0	1	0	5	0	0	0
16	DF	(Italy) ITA	Salvatore Bocchetti	18	1	12	1	1	0	1	0	3	0	1	0
17	DF	(Russia) RUS	Georgi Tigiyev	3	0	2+1	0	0	0	0	0	0	0	0	0
18	MF	(Russia) RUS	Zelimkhan Bakayev	5	0	3+2	0	0	0	0	0	0	0	0	0
19	MF	(Russia) RUS	Aleksandr Samedov	28	3	18+3	2	2+1	0	0	0	2+2	1	0	0
23	DF	(Russia) RUS	Dmitri Kombarov	35	0	23+2	0	3	0	1	0	4	0	2	0
25	FW	(Paraguay) PAR	Lorenzo Melgarejo	32	7	9+12	3	2	2	0+1	0	1+5	1	1+1	1
29	DF	(Russia) RUS	Ilya Kutepov	26	2	15+3	1	3	1	0	0	3	0	1+1	0
30	MF	(Algeria) ALG	Sofiane Hanni	11	2	6+1	2	1+1	0	0	0	0	0	1+1	0
32	GK	(Russia) RUS	Artyom Rebrov	13	0	9	0	0	0	1	0	2	0	1	0
33	DF	(Serbia) SRB	Nikola Maksimović	11	0	8+1	0	2	0	0	0	0	0	0	0
38	DF	(Russia) RUS	Andrey Yeshchenko	34	0	22+1	0	3	0	1	0	5	0	2	0
40	MF	(Russia) RUS	Artyom Timofeyev	8	0	5+3	0	0	0	0	0	0	0	0	0
46	DF	(Russia) RUS	Artyom Mamin	1	0	0+1	0	0	0	0	0	0	0	0	0
47	MF	(Russia) RUS	Roman Zobnin	20	0	10+4	0	2	0	0	0	1+1	0	2	0
50	MF	(Croatia) CRO	Mario Pašalić	32	5	10+11	4	3+1	1	0	0	4+2	0	1	0
57	GK	(Russia) RUS	Aleksandr Selikhov	30	0	21	0	3	0	0	0	4+1	0	1	0
69	FW	(Russia) RUS	Denis Davydov	1	0	0	0	1	0	0	0	0	0	0	0
87	MF	(Russia) RUS	Soltmurad Bakayev	1	0	0	0	0+1	0	0	0	0	0	0	0
98	GK	(Russia) RUS	Aleksandr Maksimenko	1	0	0	0	1	0	0	0	0	0	0	0
99	FW	(Brazil) BRA	Pedro Rocha	14	1	4+7	1	1+1	0	0	0	0+1	0	0	0
Players away from the club on loan:
71	MF	(Bulgaria) BUL	Ivelin Popov	21	0	8+5	0	0+2	0	1	0	3+2	0	0	0
Players who left Spartak Moscow during the season:
21	MF	(Russia) RUS	Artyom Samsonov	2	0	0+2	0	0	0	0	0	0	0	0	0

=== Goal scorers ===
Place	Position	Nation	Number	Name	Premier League	Russian Cup	Super Cup	Champions League	Europa League	Total
1	FW	(Netherlands)	10	Quincy Promes	15	3	1	2	0	21
2	FW	(Brazil)	12	Luiz Adriano	10	1	1	1	2	15
3	FW	(Paraguay)	25	Lorenzo Melgarejo	3	2	0	1	1	7
4	FW	(Cape Verde)	9	Zé Luís	3	2	0	1	0	6
5	MF	(Croatia)	50	Mario Pašalić	4	1	0	0	0	5
5	MF	(Russia)	8	Denis Glushakov	4	0	0	1	0	5
5	MF	(Brazil)	11	Fernando	4	0	0	1	0	5
8	MF	(Russia)	19	Aleksandr Samedov	2	0	0	1	0	3
9	MF	(Algeria)	30	Sofiane Hanni	1	0	0	0	0	1
9	DF	(Russia)	29	Ilya Kutepov	1	1	0	0	0	2
11	MF	(Brazil)	11	Fernando	1	0	0	0	0	1
11	DF	(Russia)	14	Georgi Dzhikiya	1	0	0	0	0	1
11	FW	(Brazil)	99	Pedro Rocha	1	0	0	0	0	1
11	DF	(Italy)	16	Salvatore Bocchetti	1	0	0	0	0	1
11				Own goal	0	1	0	0	0	1
				TOTALS	50	11	2	9	3	75

=== Clean sheets ===
Place	Position	Nation	Number	Name	Premier League	Russian Cup	Super Cup	Champions League	Europa League	Total
1	GK	(Russia)	57	Aleksandr Selikhov	10	1	0	0	0	11
2	GK	(Russia)	32	Artyom Rebrov	3	0	0	0	0	2
				TOTALS	13	1	0	0	0	14

=== Disciplinary record ===
Number	Nation	Position	Name	Premier League		Russian Cup		Super Cup		Champions League		Europa League		Total	
Number	Nation	Position	Name	Yellow card	Red card	Yellow card	Red card	Yellow card	Red card	Yellow card	Red card	Yellow card	Red card	Yellow card	Red card
3	(Serbia)	DF	Marko Petković	1	0	0	0	0	0	0	0	0	0	1	0
5	(Germany)	DF	Serdar Tasci	1	0	0	0	0	0	1	0	0	0	2	0
8	(Russia)	MF	Denis Glushakov	3	0	0	0	0	0	1	0	1	0	5	0
9	(Cape Verde)	FW	Zé Luís	2	0	0	0	0	0	0	0	0	0	2	0
10	(Netherlands)	FW	Quincy Promes	4	0	1	0	0	0	0	0	0	0	5	0
11	(Brazil)	MF	Fernando	7	1	0	0	0	0	1	0	0	0	8	1
12	(Brazil)	FW	Luiz Adriano	4	1	0	0	1	0	1	0	1	0	7	1
14	(Russia)	DF	Georgi Dzhikiya	4	0	0	0	1	0	3	0	0	0	8	0
16	(Italy)	DF	Salvatore Bocchetti	4	0	0	0	1	0	1	0	1	0	7	0
17	(Russia)	DF	Georgi Tigiyev	1	0	0	0	0	0	0	0	0	0	1	0
19	(Russia)	MF	Aleksandr Samedov	5	1	0	0	0	0	0	0	0	0	5	1
23	(Russia)	MF	Dmitri Kombarov	3	0	1	0	0	0	0	0	1	0	5	0
25	(Paraguay)	FW	Lorenzo Melgarejo	1	0	0	0	0	0	0	0	0	0	1	0
29	(Russia)	DF	Ilya Kutepov	5	0	0	0	0	0	1	0	1	0	7	0
32	(Russia)	GK	Artyom Rebrov	1	0	0	0	0	0	0	0	0	0	1	0
33	(Serbia)	DF	Nikola Maksimović	2	0	0	0	0	0	0	0	0	0	2	0
38	(Russia)	DF	Andrey Yeshchenko	4	0	0	0	1	0	0	0	1	0	6	0
40	(Russia)	MF	Artyom Timofeyev	1	0	0	0	0	0	0	0	0	0	1	0
47	(Russia)	MF	Roman Zobnin	2	0	1	0	0	0	0	0	1	0	4	0
50	(Croatia)	MF	Mario Pašalić	1	0	0	0	0	0	0	0	0	0	1	0
57	(Russia)	GK	Aleksandr Selikhov	1	0	0	0	0	0	0	0	0	0	1	0
Players away on loan:
71	(Bulgaria)	MF	Ivelin Popov	2	0	0	0	0	0	1	0	0	0	3	0
Players who left Spartak Moscow season during the season:
			TOTALS	61	3	1	0	4	0	10	0	7	0	83	3
