= Ilya Kutepov =

Russian footballer (born 1993)

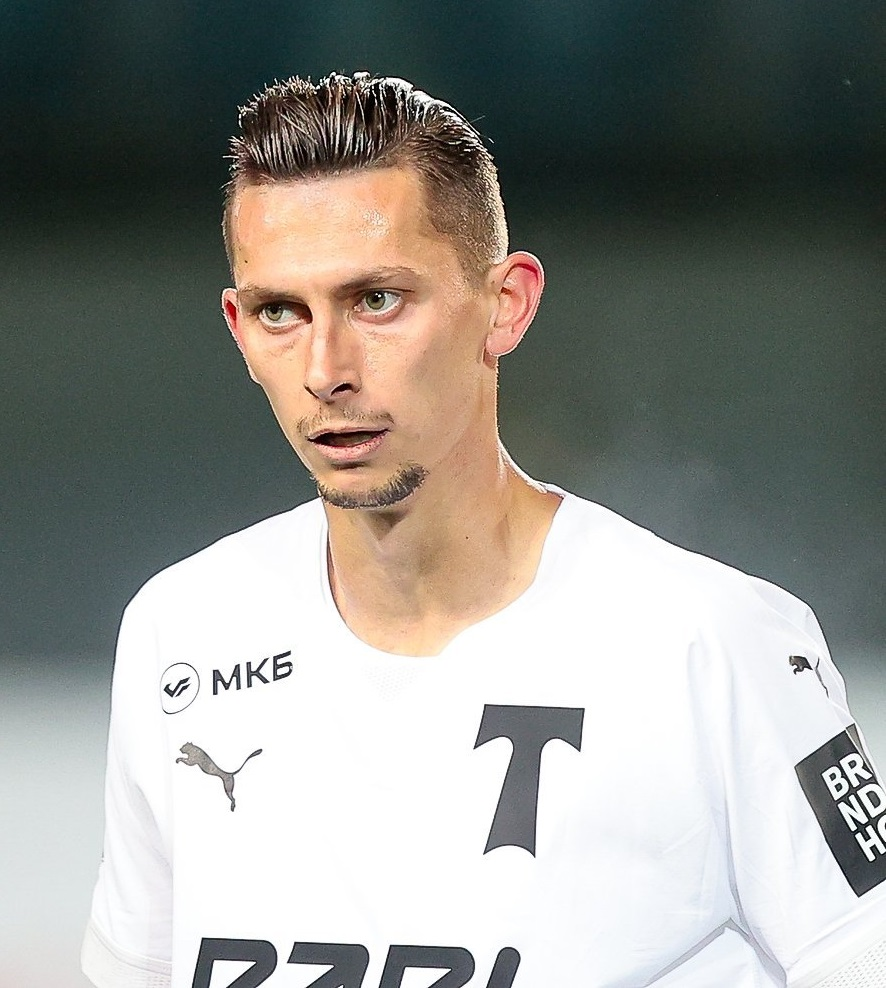
- Kutepov with Torpedo Moscow in 2022

Personal information
- Full name: Ilya Olegovich Kutepov
- Date of birth: 29 July 1993 (age 33)
- Place of birth: Stavropol, Russia
- Height: 1.92 m (6 ft 4 in)
- Position: Centre-back

Youth career
- 2000–2005: Dynamo Stavropol
- 2005–2007: ShBFR Gelendzhik
- 2007–2010: Konoplyov football academy

Senior career*
Years	Team	Apps	(Gls)
2010–2012	Akademiya Togliatti	24	(0)
2012–2022	Spartak Moscow	93	(1)
2013–2021	→ Spartak-2 Moscow	70	(6)
2022–2023	Torpedo Moscow	9	(0)
2023–2025	Veles Moscow	42	(3)
2025	Narodnaya Komanda Moscow (amateur)		

International career^{‡}
2009	Russia U-16	2	(0)
2009–2010	Russia U-17	9	(3)
2010–2011	Russia U-19	10	(0)
2011	Russia U-18	1	(0)
2011–2013	Russia U-21	3	(0)
2016–2021	Russia	13	(0)
- * Club domestic league appearances and goals as of 29 April 2025 ‡ National team caps and goals as of 8 October 2020

Ilya Olegovich Kutepov (Russian: Илья Олегович Кутепов, IPA: [ɪˈlʲja ɐˈlʲeɡəvʲɪtɕ kʊˈtʲepəf]; born 29 July 1993) is a Russian former professional football player who played as centre-back.

== Club career ==
He made his debut in the Russian Premier League on 10 December 2012 for FC Spartak Moscow in a game against FC Rubin Kazan. During his time at the club, he won the 2016-17 Russian Premier League, 2017 Russian Super Cup and 2021-22 Russian Cup. He left Spartak upon the expiration of his contract on 2 June 2022.

On 1 July 2022, Kutepov signed a contract with Torpedo Moscow for one season with an option for the second year.

== International career ==
He was called up to the senior Russia squad in August 2016 for matches against Turkey and Ghana. He made his debut on 9 October 2016 in a friendly against Costa Rica.

On 11 May 2018, he was included in Russia's extended 2018 FIFA World Cup squad. On 3 June 2018, he was included in the finalized World Cup squad. He started and played every minute of every game as Russia was eliminated in the quarterfinal shoot-out by Croatia.

== Career statistics ==
=== Club ===
As of 27 November 2022

Club	Season	League			Cup		Continental		Total	
Club	Season	Division	Apps	Goals	Apps	Goals	Apps	Goals	Apps	Goals
FC Togliatti	2009	PFL	0	0	0	0	–		0	0
FC Akademiya Tolyatti	2010	PFL	7	0	0	0	–		7	0
FC Akademiya Tolyatti	2011–12	PFL	17	0	0	0	–		17	0
FC Akademiya Tolyatti	Total		24	0	0	0	0	0	24	0
FC Spartak-2 Moscow	2013–14	PFL	21	3	–		–		21	3
FC Spartak-2 Moscow	2014–15	PFL	21	2	–		–		21	2
FC Spartak-2 Moscow	2015–16	FNL	24	1	–		–		24	1
FC Spartak-2 Moscow	2017–18	FNL	1	0	–		–		1	0
FC Spartak-2 Moscow	2021–22	FNL	3	0	–		–		3	0
FC Spartak-2 Moscow	Total		70	6	0	0	0	0	70	6
FC Spartak Moscow	2012–13	RPL	1	0	0	0	0	0	1	0
FC Spartak Moscow	2013–14	RPL	0	0	0	0	0	0	0	0
FC Spartak Moscow	2014–15	RPL	0	0	1	0	–		1	0
FC Spartak Moscow	2015–16	RPL	10	0	0	0	–		10	0
FC Spartak Moscow	2016–17	RPL	24	0	0	0	2 (Note: Appearances in the UEFA Europa League)	0	26	0
FC Spartak Moscow	2017–18	RPL	18	1	3	1	5 (Note: Three appearances in the UEFA Champions League, two appearances in the UEFA Europa League)	0	26	2
FC Spartak Moscow	2018–19	RPL	9	0	2	0	3	0	14	0
FC Spartak Moscow	2019–20	RPL	11	0	2	0	0	0	13	0
FC Spartak Moscow	2020–21	RPL	16	0	2	0	–		18	0
FC Spartak Moscow	2021–22	RPL	4	0	0	0	1	0	5	0
FC Spartak Moscow	Total		93	1	10	1	11	0	114	2
Torpedo Moscow	2022–23	RPL	6	0	4	0	–		10	0
Career total			193	7	14	1	11	0	218	8

=== International ===
Statistics accurate as of match played 8 October 2020.

Russia
Year	Apps	Goals
2016	3	0
2017	2	0
2018	7	0
2019	0	0
2020	1	0
Total	13	0

== Honours ==
Spartak Moscow

- Russian Premier League: 2016-17
- Russian Super Cup: 2017

Russia U21

- Commonwealth of Independent States Cup:2013
