= Aleksandr Makarov (footballer, born 1996) =

Russian footballer

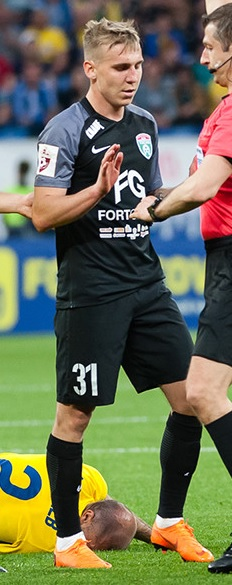
- Makarov with Tosno in 2018

Personal information
- Full name: Aleksandr Yuryevich Makarov
- Date of birth: 24 April 1996 (age 30)
- Place of birth: Yershov, Russia
- Height: 1.78 m (5 ft 10 in)
- Position: Midfielder

Team information
- Current team: Chertanovo Education Center (coach)

Youth career
- FC Lokomotiv Yershov
- CSKA Moscow

Senior career*
Years	Team	Apps	(Gls)
2013–2019	CSKA Moscow	1	(0)
2016	→ Baltika Kaliningrad (loan)	12	(2)
2016–2017	→ Tosno (loan)	16	(4)
2018	→ Tosno (loan)	6	(0)
2019	→ Avangard Kursk (loan)	4	(0)
2019–2020	Avangard Kursk	0	(0)

International career
2011	Russia U-16	2	(0)
2012–2013	Russia U-17	23	(4)
2014	Russia U-18	4	(2)
2014	Russia U-19	3	(0)
2017–2018	Russia U-21	5	(1)

Managerial career
- 2020–: Chertanovo Education Center
- * Club domestic league appearances and goals

Aleksandr Yuryevich Makarov (Russian: Александр Юрьевич Макаров; born 24 April 1996) is a Russian football coach and a former player who played as a right winger. He works at the Chertanovo Education Center.

== Club career ==
He made his debut in the Russian Football National League for FC Baltika Kaliningrad on 27 March 2016 in a game against FC Torpedo Armavir.

He made his PFC CSKA Moscow debut on 25 July 2017 in a 2017–18 UEFA Champions League third qualifying round game against AEK Athens.

On 9 February 2018, Makarov re-joined FC Tosno on loan until the end of the 2017–18 season.

In June 2018, Makarov suffered a torn ACL in his left knee.

On 19 February 2019, Makarov joined Avangard Kursk on loan for the remainder of the season.

On 30 August 2019, he moved to Avangard on a permanent basis.

=== International ===
He won the 2013 UEFA European Under-17 Championship with Russia national under-17 football team, he also participated with it in the 2013 FIFA U-17 World Cup.

== Career statistics ==
=== Club ===
As of match played 13 May 2018

Club	Season	League			Cup		Continental		Total	
Club	Season	Division	Apps	Goals	Apps	Goals	Apps	Goals	Apps	Goals
CSKA Moscow	2013–14	Russian Premier League	0	0	0	0	0	0	0	0
CSKA Moscow	2014–15	Russian Premier League	0	0	0	0	0	0	0	0
CSKA Moscow	2015–16	Russian Premier League	0	0	0	0	0	0	0	0
CSKA Moscow	2017–18	Russian Premier League	1	0	0	0	1	0	2	0
CSKA Moscow	2018–19	Russian Premier League	0	0	0	0	0	0	0	0
CSKA Moscow	Total		1	0	0	0	1	0	2	0
Baltika Kaliningrad (loan)	2015–16	FNL	12	2	–		–		12	2
Tosno (loan)	2016–17	FNL	16	4	2	0	–		18	4
Tosno (loan)	2017–18	Russian Premier League	6	0	1	0	–		7	0
Avangard Kursk (loan)	2018–19	FNL	0	0	0	0	–		0	0
Career total			35	6	3	0	1	0	39	6

== Honours ==
=== Club ===
Tosno

- Russian Cup: 2017–18

=== International ===
Russia U-17

- UEFA European Under-17 Championship: 2013
