= Vasili Lukichev =

Russian footballer

Personal information
- Full name: Vasili Aleksandrovich Lukichev
- Date of birth: 31 December 1991 (age 34)
- Place of birth: Moscow, Russian SFSR
- Height: 1.93 m (6 ft 4 in)
- Position: Goalkeeper

Team information
- Current team: FC Strogino Moscow (GK coach)

Youth career
- FC FShM Torpedo Moscow

Senior career*
Years	Team	Apps	(Gls)
2010	FC Zelenograd	15	(0)
2011–2012	FC Lokomotiv-2 Moscow	3	(0)
2013–2015	FC Strogino Moscow	54	(0)
2016–2018	FC Tosno	1	(0)
2019	FC Krymteplytsia Molodizhne		
2019	FC Kolomna	8	(0)

Managerial career
- 2021–: FC Strogino Moscow (GK coach)
- * Club domestic league appearances and goals

Vasili Aleksandrovich Lukichev (Russian: Василий Александрович Лукичев; born 31 December 1991) is a Russian professional football coach and a former goalkeeper. He is the goalkeeping coach with FC Strogino Moscow.

== Club career ==
He made his Russian Football National League debut for FC Tosno on 2 April 2016 in a game against FC Tyumen.
