= Andrei Pavlenko (footballer) =

Russian footballer

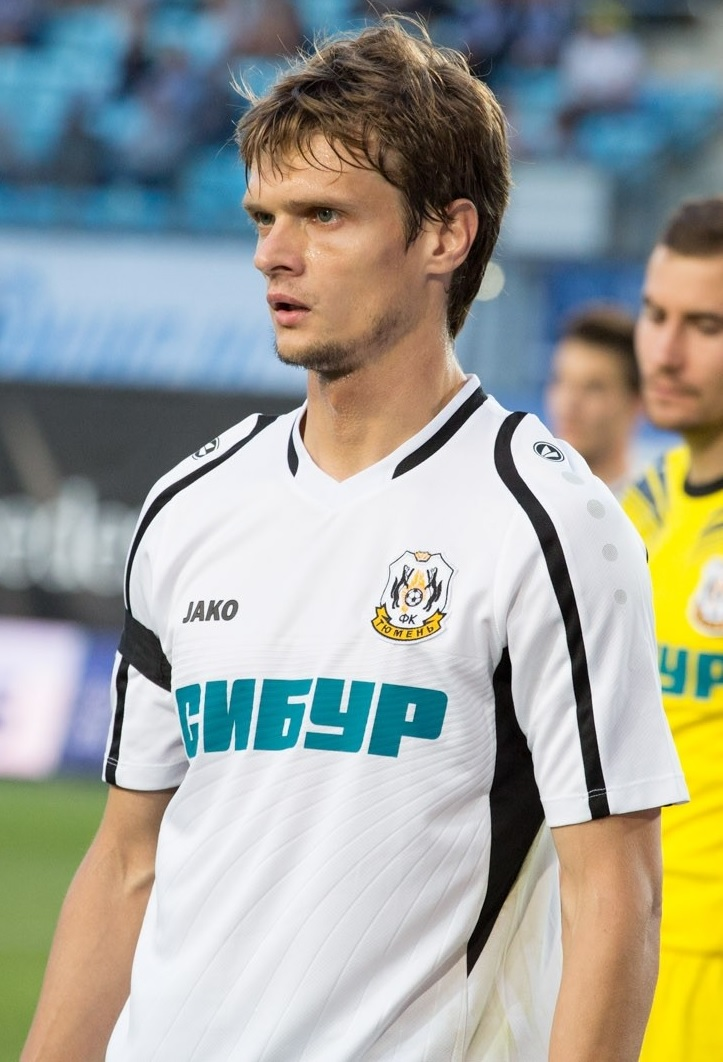
- Pavlenko with Tyumen in 2016

Personal information
- Full name: Andrei Viktorovich Pavlenko
- Date of birth: 12 July 1986 (age 40)
- Place of birth: Potsdam, East Germany
- Height: 1.81 m (5 ft 11 1/2 in)
- Position: Midfielder

Senior career*
Years	Team	Apps	(Gls)
2003–2007	FC Spartak Tambov	120	(7)
2008–2009	FC Nosta Novotroitsk	37	(1)
2010	FC Tyumen	19	(2)
2011–2012	FC Volga Ulyanovsk	25	(3)
2012–2017	FC Tyumen	169	(15)
2018–2019	FC Luch Vladivostok	45	(4)
2019–2020	FC Chayka Peschanokopskoye	20	(1)
2020	FC Tyumen	0	(0)
- * Club domestic league appearances and goals

Andrei Viktorovich Pavlenko (Russian: Андрей Викторович Павленко; born 12 July 1986) is a Russian former professional football player.

== Club career ==
He made his Russian Football National League debut for FC Nosta Novotroitsk on 9 April 2008 in a game against FC Dynamo Bryansk.
