= Boris Tsygankov =

Russian footballer

Personal information
- Full name: Boris Dmitriyevich Tsygankov
- Date of birth: 17 April 1998 (age 28)
- Place of birth: Moscow, Russia
- Height: 1.79 m (5 ft 10 in)
- Position: Midfielder

Youth career
- –2018: Spartak Moscow

Senior career*
Years	Team	Apps	(Gls)
2017–2018	Spartak-2 Moscow	9	(0)
2018	→ Torpedo Minsk (loan)	16	(1)
2019	Akademiya Futbola Krasnodar		
2019–2020	Kolomna	13	(2)
2020–2021	Smolensk	18	(5)
2021	Luki-Energiya Velikiye Luki	13	(0)
2022	Saturn Ramenskoye	8	(0)
2022–2023	Novosibirsk	11	(0)
2023–2024	Tver	39	(3)

International career
2014–2015	Russia U17	27	(1)
2015–2016	Russia U18	9	(2)
2016	Russia U19	2	(0)
- * Club domestic league appearances and goals as of 3 November 2024

Boris Dmitriyevich Tsygankov (Russian: Борис Дмитриевич Цыганков; born 17 April 1998) is a Russian football player.

== Club career ==
He made his debut in the Russian Football National League for Spartak-2 Moscow on 8 July 2017 in a game against Sibir Novosibirsk.

== International ==
He played for the Russia national under-17 football team in the 2015 UEFA European Under-17 Championship and 2015 FIFA U-17 World Cup.
