= Yan Kazayev =

Russian footballer

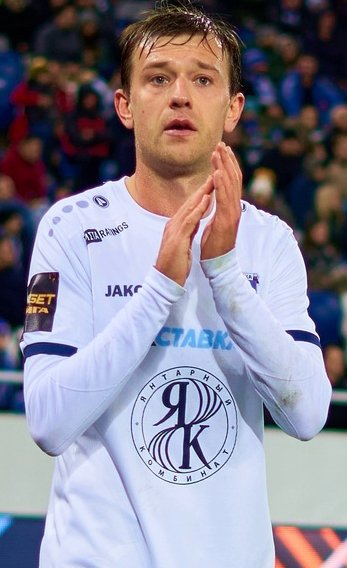

Personal information
- Full name: Yan Igorevich Kazayev
- Date of birth: 26 November 1991 (age 34)
- Place of birth: Saint Petersburg, Russian SFSR
- Height: 1.83 m (6 ft 0 in)
- Position: Central midfielder

Senior career*
Years	Team	Apps	(Gls)
2011–2013	FC Karelia Petrozavodsk	46	(7)
2013–2014	FC Tosno	17	(2)
2014	FC Taganrog	8	(4)
2015	FC Dynamo Saint Petersburg	11	(1)
2015–2017	FC Khimki	62	(12)
2017–2018	FC Tosno	15	(0)
2018	→ FC Tom Tomsk (loan)	10	(1)
2018	FC Tom Tomsk	22	(3)
2019	PFC Sochi	15	(2)
2019–2024	FC Baltika Kaliningrad	107	(20)
2024	FC Chelyabinsk	16	(1)
- * Club domestic league appearances and goals

Yan Igorevich Kazayev (Russian: Ян Игоревич Казаев; born 26 November 1991) is a Russian former professional footballer who played as a central midfielder.

== Club career ==
He made his debut in the Russian Second Division for FC Karelia Petrozavodsk on 21 April 2011 in a game against FC Pskov-747 Pskov.

He made his Russian Premier League debut for FC Tosno on 30 July 2017 in a game against FC Zenit Saint Petersburg.

Kazayev left FC Baltika Kaliningrad by mutual consent on 5 February 2024.

== Honours ==
=== Club ===
Tosno

- Russian Cup: 2017–18
