= Georgi Melkadze =

Russian footballer

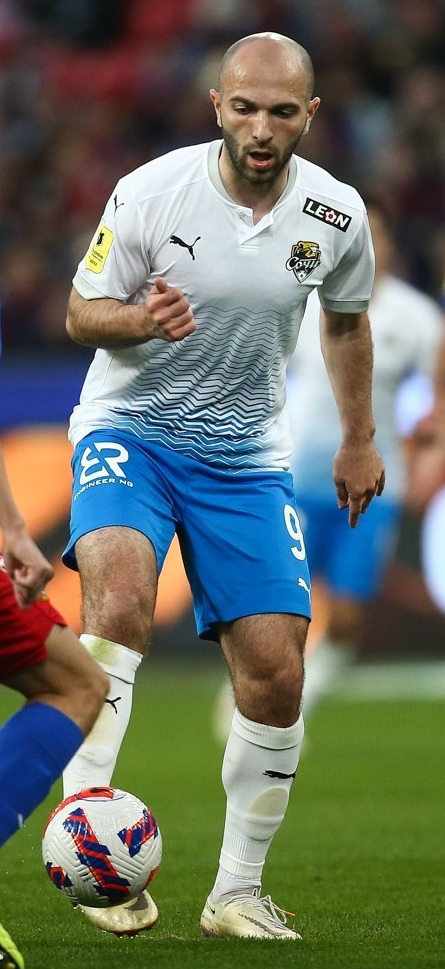
- Melkadze with Sochi in 2022

Personal information
- Full name: Georgi Dzhemalovich Melkadze
- Date of birth: 4 April 1997 (age 29)
- Place of birth: Moscow, Russia
- Height: 1.86 m (6 ft 1 in)
- Position: Centre-forward

Team information
- Current team: Akhmat Grozny
- Number: 77

Youth career
- –2014: Spartak Moscow

Senior career*
Years	Team	Apps	(Gls)
2014–2019	Spartak-2 Moscow	70	(21)
2015–2022	Spartak Moscow	21	(0)
2017–2018	→ Tosno (loan)	21	(0)
2019–2020	→ Tambov (loan)	18	(7)
2020–2021	→ Akhmat Grozny (loan)	19	(3)
2022–2024	Sochi	44	(7)
2024–2025	Kolkheti-1913 Poti	30	(5)
2025–	Akhmat Grozny	50	(13)

International career^{‡}
2012	Russia U15	2	(0)
2012–2013	Russia U16	13	(2)
2013–2014	Russia U17	13	(2)
2014–2015	Russia U18	12	(6)
2015–2016	Russia U19	15	(1)
2017–2018	Russia U21	16	(8)
2026–	Russia	4	(0)
- * Club domestic league appearances and goals as of 21 November 2026 ‡ National team caps and goals as of 9 June 2026

Georgi Dzhemalovich Melkadze (Russian: Георгий Джемалович Мелкадзе, Georgian: გიორგი მელქაძე; born 4 April 1997) is a Russian football player who plays as a centre-forward for Akhmat Grozny and the Russia national team. He played mostly as a left winger earlier in his career.

== Club career ==
Melkadze made his debut in the Russian Professional Football League for Spartak-2 Moscow on 23 September 2014 in a game against Znamya Truda Orekhovo-Zuyevo.

He made his Russian Premier League debut for Spartak Moscow on 17 May 2015 in a game against CSKA Moscow.

On 5 June 2017, Melkadze joined the RPL newcomer Tosno on loan for the 2017–18 season.

On 29 May 2019, he extended his Spartak contract by 3 years.

On 2 September 2019, he joined Tambov on loan for the 2019–20 season.

On 14 August 2020, Melkadze was loaned to Akhmat Grozny for the 2020–21 season.

On 25 January 2022, Melkadze signed with Sochi. On 14 January 2024, Melkadze left Sochi by mutual consent.

On 30 January 2025, Melkadze returned to Akhmat Grozny on a two-and-a-half-year contract.

== International career ==
Melkadze was first called up to Russia national team in March 2026 for friendlies against Nicaragua and Mali. He made his debut on 27 March 2026 against Nicaragua.

== Career statistics ==
=== Club ===
As of 21 November 2026

Club	Season	League			Cup		Continental		Other		Total	
Club	Season	Division	Apps	Goals	Apps	Goals	Apps	Goals	Apps	Goals	Apps	Goals
Spartak-2 Moscow	2014–15	Russian Second League	7	1	–		–		–		7	1
Spartak-2 Moscow	2015–16	Russian First League	22	7	–		–		–		22	7
Spartak-2 Moscow	2016–17	Russian First League	26	11	–		–		4 (Note: Appearances in the FNL Cup)	1	30	12
Spartak-2 Moscow	2018–19	Russian First League	13	2	–		–		–		13	2
Spartak-2 Moscow	2019–20	Russian First League	2	0	–		–		–		2	0
Spartak-2 Moscow	Total		70	21	0	0	0	0	4	1	74	22
Spartak Moscow	2014–15	Russian Premier League	2	0	0	0	–		–		2	0
Spartak Moscow	2015–16	Russian Premier League	4	0	0	0	–		–		4	0
Spartak Moscow	2016–17	Russian Premier League	0	0	1	0	1 (Note: Appearances in the UEFA Europa League)	0	–		2	0
Spartak Moscow	2018–19	Russian Premier League	10	0	1	0	0	0	–		11	0
Spartak Moscow	2019–20	Russian Premier League	2	0	–		1	0	–		3	0
Spartak Moscow	2021–22	Russian Premier League	3	0	0	0	1	0	–		4	0
Spartak Moscow	Total		21	0	2	0	3	0	0	0	26	0
Tosno (loan)	2017–18	Russian Premier League	21	0	1	0	–		–		22	0
Tambov (loan)	2019–20	Russian Premier League	18	7	0	0	–		3	1	21	8
Akhmat Grozny (loan)	2020–21	Russian Premier League	19	3	5	0	–		–		24	3
Sochi	2021–22	Russian Premier League	12	2	1	0	–		–		13	2
Sochi	2022–23	Russian Premier League	24	5	4	0	–		–		28	5
Sochi	2023–24	Russian Premier League	8	0	3	0	–		–		11	0
Sochi	Total		44	7	8	0	0	0	0	0	52	7
Kolkheti-1913 Poti	2024	Erovnuli Liga	30	5	3	1	–		–		33	6
Akhmat Grozny	2024–25	Russian Premier League	12	2	1	0	–		2 (Note: Appearance in the relegation play-offs)	2	15	4
Akhmat Grozny	2025–26	Russian Premier League	25	7	6	1	–		–		31	8
Akhmat Grozny	2026–27	Russian Premier League	13	4	3	1	–		–		16	5
Akhmat Grozny	Total		50	13	10	2	0	0	2	2	62	17
Akhmat Grozny	Club total		69	16	15	2	0	0	2	2	86	20
Career total			273	56	29	3	3	0	9	4	314	63

=== International ===
As of match played 9 June 2026

Appearances and goals by national team and year
National team	Year	Apps	Goals
Russia	2026	4	0
Total		4	0

== Honours ==
=== Club ===
Tosno

- Russian Cup: 2017–18

=== International ===
Russia U19

- UEFA European Under-19 Championship: 2015 Runner-up
