= Yevgeni Markov (footballer, born 1994) =

Russian footballer (born 1994)

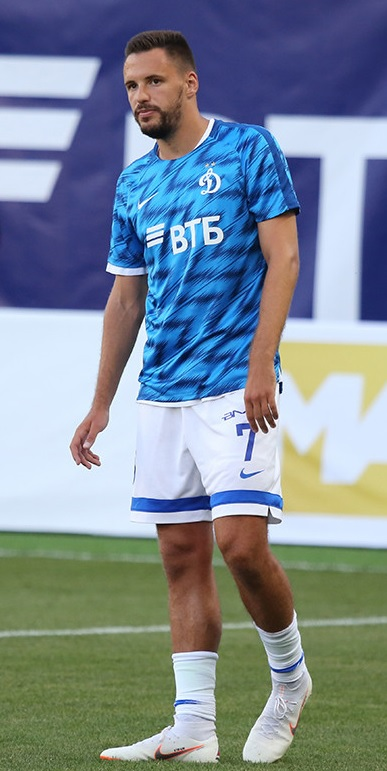
- Markov with Dynamo Moscow in 2018

Personal information
- Full name: Yevgeni Stanislavovich Markov
- Date of birth: 7 July 1994 (age 32)
- Place of birth: Saint Petersburg, Russia
- Height: 1.87 m (6 ft 2 in)
- Position: Forward

Youth career
- 1999–2014: Zenit Saint Petersburg

Senior career*
Years	Team	Apps	(Gls)
2013–2016	Zenit-2 Saint Petersburg	30	(6)
2014–2015	→ Yenisey Krasnoyarsk (loan)	17	(4)
2016–2017	Tosno	53	(21)
2018–2020	Dynamo Moscow	29	(4)
2019–2020	→ Rubin Kazan (loan)	22	(5)
2020–2021	Krasnodar	7	(0)
2020–2021	→ Krasnodar-2	3	(0)
2021–2022	Arsenal Tula	28	(4)
2022–2025	Fakel Voronezh	54	(13)
2025–2026	Ural Yekaterinburg	31	(0)

International career^{‡}
2009	Russia U-15	2	(1)
2009–2010	Russia U-16	4	(1)
2010	Russia U-17	4	(0)
2012	Russia U-18	1	(0)
2015	Russia U-21	1	(0)
- * Club domestic league appearances and goals as of 29 May 2026 ‡ National team caps and goals as of 16 January 2015

Yevgeni Stanislavovich Markov (Russian: Евгений Станиславович Марков; born 7 July 1994) is a Russian professional footballer who plays as a striker.

== Career ==
Markov made his professional debut in the Russian Professional Football League for Zenit-2 Saint Petersburg on 15 July 2013 in a game against FC Tosno.

He made his debut in the Russian Football National League for Yenisey Krasnoyarsk on 7 September 2014 in a game against Volga Nizhny Novgorod.

On 18 January 2018, Markov signed a contract with Dynamo Moscow.

On 5 July 2019, he joined Rubin Kazan on loan for the 2019–20 season.

On 6 October 2020, he signed a two-year contract with FC Krasnodar. On 31 May 2021, his contract with Krasnodar was terminated early by mutual consent.

On 9 June 2021, he signed a two-year contract with Arsenal Tula.

On 22 November 2022, Markov joined Fakel Voronezh. He scored his first goal for Fakel on 7 June 2023 in a relegation play-off away match against his former club Yenisey Krasnoyarsk, coming as a substitute for Georgi Gongadze in the second half.

On 31 January 2025, Markov moved to Ural Yekaterinburg.

== Career statistics ==
=== Club ===
As of match played 23 May 2026

Appearances and goals by club, season and competition
Club	Season	League			Cup		Continental		Other		Total	
Club	Season	Division	Apps	Goals	Apps	Goals	Apps	Goals	Apps	Goals	Apps	Goals
Zenit-2 St. Petersburg	2013–14	Russian Second League	15	5	–		–		–		15	5
Zenit-2 St. Petersburg	2015–16	Russian First League	15	1	–		–		–		15	1
Zenit-2 St. Petersburg	Total		30	6	0	0	0	0	0	0	30	6
Yenisey Krasnoyarsk (loan)	2014–15	Russian First League	17	4	1	1	–		–		18	5
Tosno	2015–16	Russian First League	13	5	–		–		–		13	5
Tosno	2016–17	Russian First League	21	8	2	0	–		–		23	8
Tosno	2017–18	Russian Premier League	19	8	2	0	–		–		21	8
Tosno	Total		53	21	4	0	0	0	0	0	57	21
Dynamo Moscow	2017–18	Russian Premier League	6	1	–		–		0	0	6	1
Dynamo Moscow	2018–19	Russian Premier League	23	3	1	1	–		0	0	24	4
Dynamo Moscow	Total		29	4	1	1	0	0	0	0	30	5
Rubin Kazan	2019–20	Russian Premier League	22	5	0	0	–		0	0	22	5
Krasnodar-2	2020–21	Russian First League	3	0	–		–		–		3	0
Krasnodar	2020–21	Russian Premier League	7	0	0	0	1 (Note: Appearance in the UEFA Champions League)	0	0	0	8	0
Arsenal Tula	2021–22	Russian Premier LEague	28	4	2	0	–		–		30	4
Fakel Voronezh	2022–23	Russian Premier League	9	0	0	0	–		2 (Note: Appearances in relegation play-offs)	1	11	1
Fakel Voronezh	2023–24	Russian Premier League	29	9	3	0	–		–		32	9
Fakel Voronezh	2024–25	Russian Premier League	16	4	3	1	–		–		19	5
Fakel Voronezh	Total		54	13	6	1	0	0	2	1	62	15
Ural Yekaterinburg	2024–25	Russian First League	13	0	2	0	–		2 (Note: Appearances in promotion play-offs)	0	17	0
Ural Yekaterinburg	2025–26	Russian First League	18	0	2	0	–		1	0	21	0
Ural Yekaterinburg	Total		31	0	4	0	0	0	3	0	38	0
Career total			274	57	18	3	1	0	5	1	298	61

== Honours ==
Tosno

- Russian Cup: 2017–18
