= Nikola Trujić =

Serbian footballer

Nikola Trujić Никола Трујић
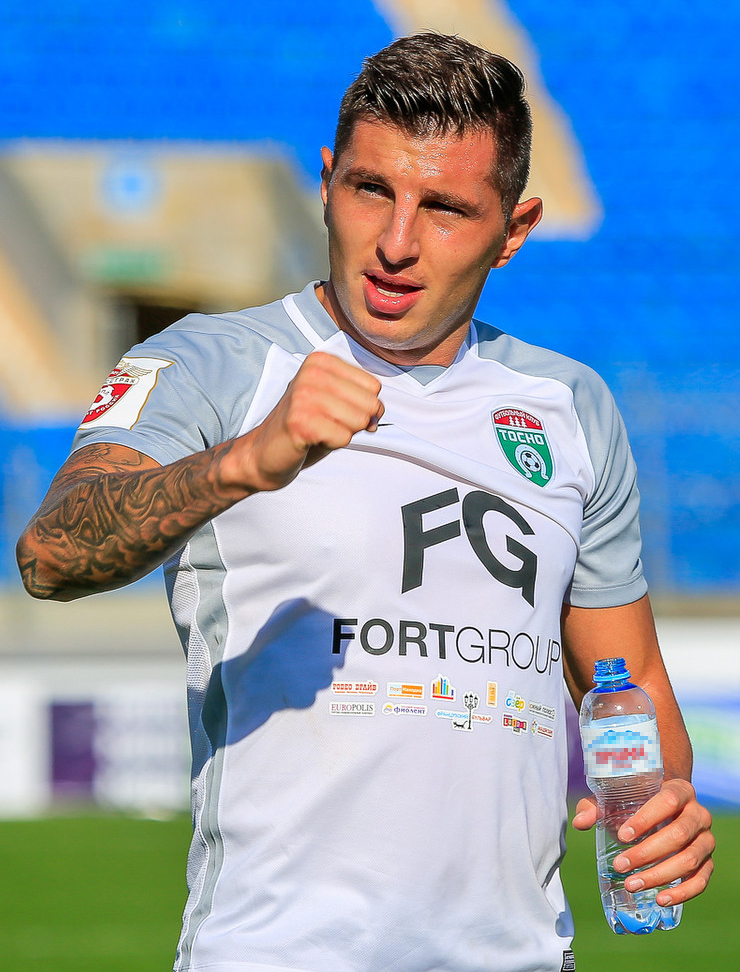
- Trujić with Tosno in 2017

Personal information
- Date of birth: 14 April 1992 (age 34)
- Place of birth: Bor, SFR Yugoslavia
- Height: 1.82 m (5 ft 11 1/2 in)
- Position: Left winger

Team information
- Current team: Krasava Ypsonas
- Number: 7

Youth career
- 1999–2005: Bor
- 2005–2010: Partizan

Senior career*
Years	Team	Apps	(Gls)
2010–2013	Partizan	0	(0)
2010–2011	→ Teleoptik (loan)	43	(6)
2011	→ Smederevo (loan)	12	(0)
2012	→ Hapoel Acre (loan)	6	(0)
2012–2013	→ Napredak Kruševac (loan)	27	(4)
2013–2015	Napredak Kruševac	53	(7)
2015	Partizan	9	(2)
2016–2017	Vojvodina	46	(12)
2017–2018	Tosno	15	(2)
2018	Botoșani	7	(1)
2019	Voždovac	11	(0)
2019–2020	Debrecen	24	(5)
2020–2021	Larissa	16	(0)
2021–2022	Erzgebirge Aue	21	(3)
2023–2024	Doxa Katokopias	55	(12)
2024–2025	Omonia 29M	30	(6)
2025–	Krasava Ypsonas	16	(2)

International career
2008–2009	Serbia U17 (Note: Only official UEFA matches included)	5	(2)
2009–2011	Serbia U19	10	(2)
2013–2015	Serbia U21	4	(0)
- * Club domestic league appearances and goals as of 14 June 2026

Nikola Trujić (Serbian Cyrillic: Никола Трујић; born 14 April 1992) is a Serbian professional footballer who plays as a winger for Krasava Ypsonas.

== Club career ==
After coming through the youth system of Partizan, Trujić made his senior debut with Teleoptik in 2010. He was subsequently sent on loan to Smederevo (2011) and Hapoel Acre (2012), but failed to make an impact. In the summer of 2012, Trujić signed his first professional contract with Partizan, on a four-year deal. He was eventually loaned to Napredak for the 2012–13 season. In the summer of 2013, after the club's promotion to the top flight, Trujić signed a permanent contract with Napredak, on a three-year deal. On 5 June 2015, Trujić returned to his parent club Partizan. He penned a four-year contract and was given the number 92 shirt. On 17 July 2015, Trujić made his competitive debut for Partizan, coming on as a substitute for Andrija Živković in a 4–0 home league win over Metalac Gornji Milanovac. He netted his first goal for the club on 1 August 2015, scoring the opener in a 2–3 away league loss at Novi Pazar. Four days later, Trujić came on off the bench and headed in the final goal of a 4–2 home win over Steaua București in the return leg of the 2015–16 UEFA Champions League third qualifying round, as Partizan progressed to the next stage. On 19 February 2016, Trujić signed a two-and-a-half-year contract with Vojvodina. He left the club due to conflict with supporters in summer 2017. On 31 August 2017, Trujić signed a two-year deal with the Russian side Tosno. On 27 June 2019, Trujić signed a one-year contract with Debrecen with an optional two additional years. On 28 July 2020, he joined AEL on a two-year deal.

=== Career statistics ===
As of 13 May 2018

Club	Season	League			Cup		Continental		Other		Total	
Club	Season	Division	Apps	Goals	Apps	Goals	Apps	Goals	Apps	Goals	Apps	Goals
Teleoptik	2009–10	Prva liga	12	0	0	0	–		–		12	0
Teleoptik	2010–11	Prva liga	31	6	2	0	–		–		33	6
Teleoptik	Total		43	6	2	0	0	0	0	0	45	6
Smederevo 1924	2011–12	Serbian SuperLiga	12	0	3	0	–		–		15	0
Hapoel Acre	2011–12	Israeli Premier League	6	0	0	0	–		–		6	0
Napredak Kruševac	2012–13	Prva liga	27	4	1	0	–		–		28	4
Napredak Kruševac	2013–14	Serbian SuperLiga	25	5	1	0	–		–		26	5
Napredak Kruševac	2014–15	Serbian SuperLiga	28	2	0	0	–		2 (Note: Two appearances in relegation play-offs)	1	30	3
Napredak Kruševac	Total		80	11	2	0	0	0	2	1	84	12
Partizan	2015–16	Serbian SuperLiga	9	2	1	0	3	1	–		13	3
Vojvodina	2015–16	Serbian SuperLiga	14	6	1	0	–		–		15	6
Vojvodina	2016–17	Serbian SuperLiga	32	6	2	1	7	2	–		41	9
Vojvodina	2017–18	Serbian SuperLiga	0	0	0	0	2	0	–		2	0
Vojvodina	Total		46	12	3	1	9	2	0	0	58	15
Tosno	2017–18	Russian Premier League	15	2	4	0	–		–		19	2
Career total			211	33	15	1	12	3	2	1	240	38

== International career ==
Trujić represented Serbia at the 2011 UEFA Under-19 Championship. He was a member of the Serbia under-21 team at the 2015 UEFA Under-21 Championship.

== Honours ==
Napredak Kruševac

- Serbian First League: 2012–13

Tosno

- Russian Cup: 2017–18
