= Andrey Buyvolov =

Russian footballer

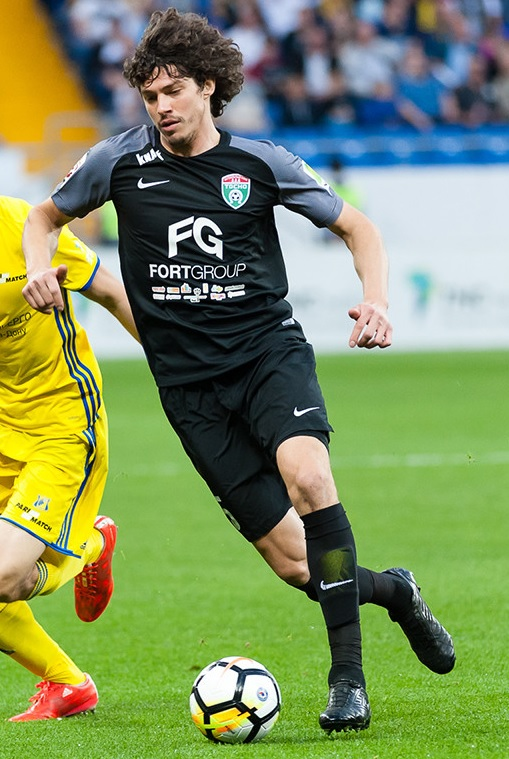
- Buyvolov with Tosno in 2018

Personal information
- Full name: Andrey Valeryevich Buyvolov
- Date of birth: 12 January 1987 (age 39)
- Place of birth: Balakhna, Nizhny Novgorod Oblast, Russian SFSR
- Height: 1.86 m (6 ft 1 in)
- Position: Centre back

Senior career*
Years	Team	Apps	(Gls)
2003–2014	Volga Nizhny Novgorod	171	(4)
2015–2016	Volga Nizhny Novgorod	46	(3)
2016–2018	Tosno	53	(1)
2018	Baltika Kaliningrad	13	(1)
2019	SKA-Khabarovsk	10	(0)
2019	Yenisey Krasnoyarsk	0	(0)
2020–2021	Shakhter Karagandy	31	(2)
2022–2023	Atlant-Shakhtyor Peshelan		

International career
2011	Russia-2	3	(0)
- * Club domestic league appearances and goals

Andrey Valeryevich Buyvolov (Russian: Андрей Валерьевич Буйволов; born 12 January 1987) is a Russian former professional football player who played as a centre-back.

== Club career ==
He played as Tosno won the 2017–18 Russian Cup final against Avangard Kursk on 9 May 2018 in the Volgograd Arena.

== Honours ==
=== Club ===
Tosno

- Russian Cup: 2017–18

== Career statistics ==
As of 13 May 2018

Club	Season	League			Cup		Continental		Total	
Club	Season	Division	Apps	Goals	Apps	Goals	Apps	Goals	Apps	Goals
Volga Nizhny Novgorod	2003	PFL	4	0	0	0	–		4	0
Volga Nizhny Novgorod	2004	PFL	9	0	0	0	–		9	0
Volga Nizhny Novgorod	2005	PFL	0	0	0	0	–		0	0
Volga Nizhny Novgorod	2006	PFL	16	0	2	0	–		18	0
Volga Nizhny Novgorod	2007	PFL	10	0	0	0	–		10	0
Volga Nizhny Novgorod	2008	PFL	32	0	6	0	–		38	0
Volga Nizhny Novgorod	2009	FNL	36	3	0	0	–		36	3
Volga Nizhny Novgorod	2010	FNL	37	1	2	1	–		39	2
Volga Nizhny Novgorod	2011–12	Russian Premier League	19	0	3	0	–		22	0
Volga Nizhny Novgorod	2012–13	Russian Premier League	8	0	0	0	–		8	0
Volga Nizhny Novgorod	2013–14	Russian Premier League	0	0	0	0	–		0	0
Volga Nizhny Novgorod	2014–15	FNL	11	0	0	0	–		11	0
Volga Nizhny Novgorod	2015–16	FNL	35	3	1	0	–		36	3
Volga Nizhny Novgorod	Total		217	7	14	1	0	0	231	8
Tosno	2016–17	FNL	32	1	3	0	–		35	1
Tosno	2017–18	Russian Premier League	21	0	4	1	–		25	1
Tosno	Total		53	1	7	1	0	0	60	2
Career total			270	8	21	2	0	0	291	10
