= Sergei Sukharev =

Russian footballer

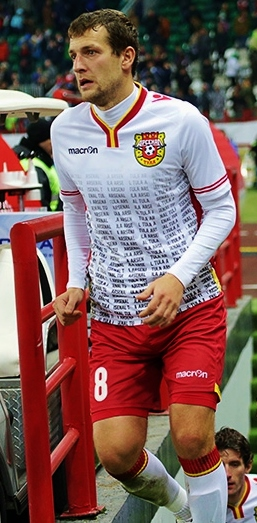
- Sukharev with Arsenal Tula in 2015

Personal information
- Full name: Sergei Aleksandrovich Sukharev
- Date of birth: 29 January 1987 (age 39)
- Place of birth: Stary Oskol, Belgorod Oblast, Russian SFSR
- Height: 1.80 m (5 ft 11 in)
- Position: Defender

Team information
- Current team: Academy Torpedo Moscow

Youth career
- 2003–2005: Torpedo Moscow

Senior career*
Years	Team	Apps	(Gls)
2004–2005	Torpedo Moscow	0	(0)
2006–2007	Volga Tver	44	(1)
2008–2009	Zodiak-Oskol Stary Oskol	58	(2)
2010	Belshina Bobruisk	22	(1)
2011–2012	Metallurg-Oskol Stary Oskol	32	(2)
2012–2015	Arsenal Tula	72	(3)
2016–2018	Tosno	31	(1)
2018–2020	Mordovia Saransk	34	(0)

Managerial career
- 2022–2024: DYuSSh Strogino Moscow
- 2025–: Academy Torpedo Moscow
- * Club domestic league appearances and goals

Sergei Aleksandrovich Sukharev (Russian: Сергей Александрович Сухарев; born 29 January 1987) is a Russian former professional football player. He played as a centre-back.

== Club career ==
He made his Russian Premier League debut for FC Arsenal Tula on 22 August 2014 in a game against FC Terek Grozny.

He played as FC Tosno won the 2017–18 Russian Cup final against FC Avangard Kursk on 9 May 2018 in the Volgograd Arena.

== Honours ==
=== Club ===
Tosno

- Russian Cup: 2017–18

== Career statistics ==
As of 13 May 2018

Club	Season	League			Cup		Continental		Total	
Club	Season	Division	Apps	Goals	Apps	Goals	Apps	Goals	Apps	Goals
Torpedo Moscow	2004	Russian Premier League	0	0	0	0	–		0	0
Torpedo Moscow	2005	Russian Premier League	0	0	0	0	–		0	0
Torpedo Moscow	Total		0	0	0	0	0	0	0	0
Volga Tver	2006	PFL	21	1	1	0	–		22	1
Volga Tver	2007	PFL	23	0	4	0	–		27	0
Volga Tver	Total		44	1	5	0	0	0	49	1
Zodiak-Oskol Stary Oskol	2008	PFL	31	0	1	0	–		32	0
Zodiak-Oskol Stary Oskol	2009	PFL	27	2	2	0	–		29	2
Belshina Bobruisk	2010	Belarusian Premier League	22	1	0	0	–		22	1
Metallurg-Oskol Stary Oskol	2011–12	PFL	32	2	4	0	–		36	2
Metallurg-Oskol Stary Oskol	Total (2 spells)		90	4	7	0	0	0	97	4
Arsenal Tula	2012–13	PFL	24	3	0	0	–		24	3
Arsenal Tula	2013–14	FNL	30	0	1	0	–		31	0
Arsenal Tula	2014–15	Russian Premier League	16	0	3	1	–		19	1
Arsenal Tula	2015–16	FNL	2	0	0	0	–		2	0
Arsenal Tula	Total		72	3	4	1	0	0	76	4
Tosno	2015–16	FNL	8	0	–		–		8	0
Tosno	2016–17	FNL	15	1	1	0	–		16	1
Tosno	2017–18	Russian Premier League	8	0	3	0	–		11	0
Tosno	Total		31	1	4	0	0	0	35	1
Career total			259	10	20	1	0	0	279	11
