= Vitali Shakhov =

Russian footballer

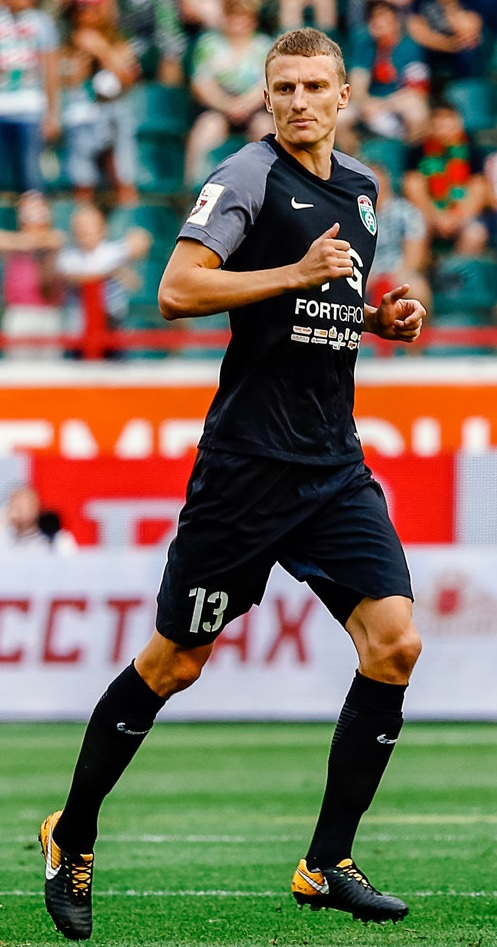
- Shakhov with Tosno in 2017

Personal information
- Full name: Vitali Viktorovich Shakhov
- Date of birth: 9 January 1991 (age 35)
- Place of birth: Severny, Russian SFSR
- Height: 1.90 m (6 ft 3 in)
- Position: Defender

Youth career
- FC Kuban Krasnodar

Senior career*
Years	Team	Apps	(Gls)
2011–2012	FC Torpedo Armavir	49	(7)
2013–2015	FC Chernomorets Novorossiysk	43	(9)
2015–2017	FC Fakel Voronezh	51	(8)
2016	→ FC Tom Tomsk (loan)	5	(0)
2017–2018	FC Tosno	13	(0)
2018	→ FC Baltika Kaliningrad (loan)	11	(2)
2018–2020	FC Orenburg	26	(0)
2020–2021	FC Tambov	12	(0)
2021	FC Baltika Kaliningrad	2	(0)
2021	FC Baltika-BFU Kaliningrad	3	(0)
2022	FC Rotor Volgograd	8	(1)
2023	FC Spartak Kostroma	8	(1)
2023–2024	FC Krasnodar-2	41	(2)
- * Club domestic league appearances and goals as of 16 November 2024

Vitali Viktorovich Shakhov (Russian: Виталий Викторович Шахов; born 9 January 1991) is a Russian former football centre-back.

== Club career ==
He made his debut in the Russian Second Division for FC Torpedo Armavir on 26 April 2011 in a game against FC SKA Rostov-on-Don.

== Honours ==
=== Club ===
FC Tosno

- Russian Cup: 2017–18
