= Artyom Samsonov (footballer, born 1994) =

Russian footballer (born 1994)

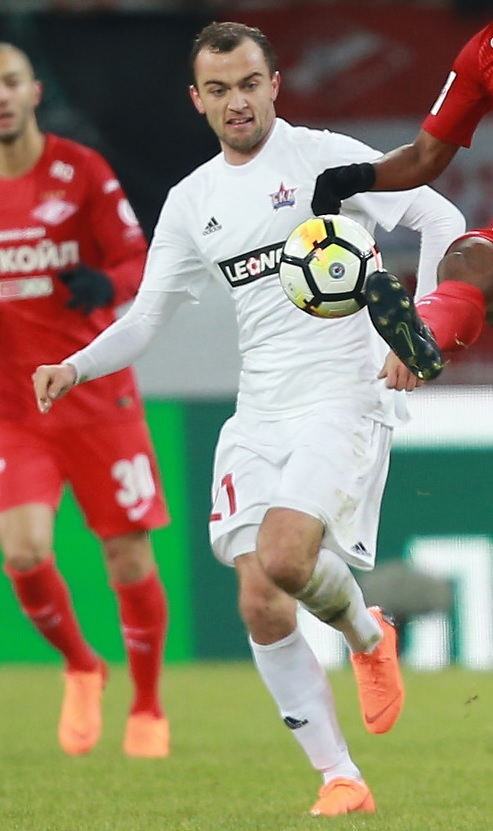
- Samsonov with SKA-Khabarovsk in 2018

Personal information
- Full name: Artyom Sergeyevich Samsonov
- Date of birth: 5 January 1994 (age 32)
- Place of birth: Kaluga, Russia
- Height: 1.77 m (5 ft 9 1/2 in)
- Position: Midfielder

Youth career
- –2015: FC Spartak Moscow

Senior career*
Years	Team	Apps	(Gls)
2013–2017	FC Spartak-2 Moscow	120	(6)
2014–2017	FC Spartak Moscow	2	(0)
2018	FC SKA-Khabarovsk	15	(1)
2018–2020	FC Rotor Volgograd	30	(0)
2020–2022	FC Shinnik Yaroslavl	41	(2)
2022–2023	FC Kaluga	32	(6)
2023	FC Shinnik Yaroslavl	17	(2)
2024	FC Murom	17	(3)
2024–2025	FC Tekstilshchik Ivanovo	18	(0)

International career^{‡}
2011–2012	Russia U18	8	(6)
2012	Russia U19	3	(0)
2015	Russia U21	2	(0)
- * Club domestic league appearances and goals as of 15 June 2025 ‡ National team caps and goals as of 12 October 2015

Artyom Sergeyevich Samsonov (Russian: Артём Сергеевич Самсонов; born 5 January 1994) is a Russian football player who plays as a right-back or defensive midfielder.

== Club career ==
He made his debut in the Russian Professional Football League for FC Spartak-2 Moscow on 16 July 2013 in a game against FC Dynamo Bryansk.

He made his Russian Premier League debut for FC Spartak Moscow on 5 November 2017 in a game against FC Ufa.

On 10 January 2018, he signed with FC SKA-Khabarovsk.

=== Career statistics ===
As of 10 December 2017

Club	Season	League			Cup		Continental		Total	
Club	Season	Division	Apps	Goals	Apps	Goals	Apps	Goals	Apps	Goals
FC Spartak Moscow	2011–12	Premier League	0	0	0	0	0	0	0	0
FC Spartak Moscow	2012–13	Premier League	0	0	0	0	0	0	0	0
FC Spartak Moscow	2013–14	Premier League	0	0	0	0	0	0	0	0
FC Spartak Moscow	2014–15	Premier League	0	0	1	0	–		1	0
FC Spartak Moscow	2015–16	Premier League	0	0	0	0	–		0	0
FC Spartak Moscow	2016–17	Premier League	0	0	0	0	0	0	0	0
FC Spartak Moscow	2017–18	Premier League	2	0	0	0	0	0	2	0
FC Spartak Moscow	Total		2	0	1	0	0	0	3	0
FC Spartak-2 Moscow	2013–14	PFL	20	0	–		–		20	0
FC Spartak-2 Moscow	2014–15	PFL	23	2	–		–		23	2
FC Spartak-2 Moscow	2015–16	FNL	29	0	–		–		29	0
FC Spartak-2 Moscow	2016–17	FNL	34	2	–		–		34	2
FC Spartak-2 Moscow	2017–18	FNL	14	2	–		–		14	2
FC Spartak-2 Moscow	Total		120	6	0	0	0	0	120	6
Career total			122	6	1	0	0	0	123	6
