= Denis Kutin =

Russian football player (born 1993)

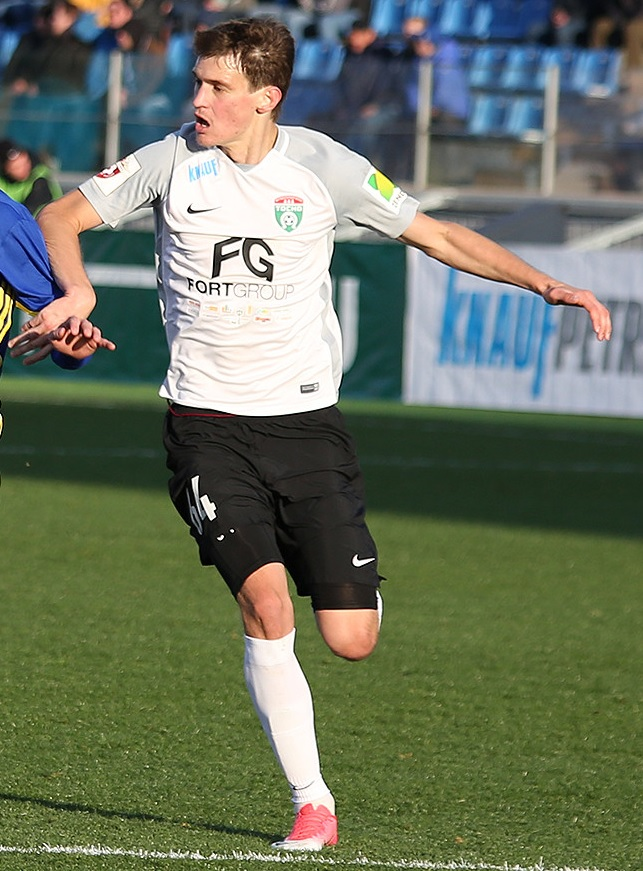
- Kutin with Tosno in 2017

Personal information
- Full name: Denis Sergeyevich Kutin
- Date of birth: 5 October 1993 (age 33)
- Place of birth: Hamburg, Germany
- Height: 1.87 m (6 ft 2 in)
- Position: Centre-back

Team information
- Current team: FC Ufa
- Number: 5

Youth career
- 1999–2005: FC Sokol Saratov
- 2005–2009: Konoplyov football academy
- 2009–2010: Chertanovo Education Center

Senior career*
Years	Team	Apps	(Gls)
2010–2018	FC Spartak Moscow	4	(0)
2013–2017	→ FC Spartak-2 Moscow	101	(3)
2017–2018	→ FC Tosno (loan)	4	(0)
2018–2020	FC Armavir	47	(0)
2020	FC Shinnik Yaroslavl	18	(0)
2021	FC Chertanovo Moscow	10	(0)
2021–2022	FC Olimp-Dolgoprudny	28	(0)
2022–2023	FC Volga Ulyanovsk	20	(0)
2023–	FC Ufa	76	(4)

International career
2009	Russia U-17	6	(1)
2010–2011	Russia U-18	6	(1)
2011	Russia U-19	4	(0)
2014	Russia U-21	4	(0)
- * Club domestic league appearances and goals as of 16 May 2026

Denis Sergeyevich Kutin (Russian: Денис Сергеевич Кутин; born 5 October 1993) is a Russian football player who plays as a centre back or right back for FC Ufa.

== Club career ==
He made his debut in the Russian Professional Football League for FC Spartak-2 Moscow on 16 July 2013 in a game against FC Dynamo Bryansk.

He made his Russian Premier League debut for FC Spartak Moscow on 30 November 2014 in a game against FC Lokomotiv Moscow.

== Honours ==
=== Club ===
Tosno

- Russian Cup: 2017–18

== Career statistics ==
As of 4 March 2018

Club	Season	League			Cup		Continental		Total	
Club	Season	Division	Apps	Goals	Apps	Goals	Apps	Goals	Apps	Goals
Spartak Moscow	2010	Russian Premier League	0	0	0	0	0	0	0	0
Spartak Moscow	2011–12	Russian Premier League	0	0	0	0	0	0	0	0
Spartak Moscow	2012–13	Russian Premier League	0	0	0	0	0	0	0	0
Spartak Moscow	2013–14	Russian Premier League	0	0	0	0	0	0	0	0
Spartak Moscow	2014–15	Russian Premier League	1	0	1	0	–		2	0
Spartak Moscow	2015–16	Russian Premier League	1	0	0	0	–		1	0
Spartak Moscow	2016–17	Russian Premier League	2	0	1	0	0	0	3	0
Spartak Moscow	Total		4	0	2	0	0	0	6	0
Spartak-2 Moscow	2013–14	PFL	26	0	–		–		26	0
Spartak-2 Moscow	2014–15	PFL	21	0	–		–		21	0
Spartak-2 Moscow	2015–16	FNL	32	3	–		–		32	3
Spartak-2 Moscow	2016–17	FNL	22	1	–		–		22	1
Spartak-2 Moscow	Total		101	4	0	0	0	0	101	4
Tosno	2017–18	Russian Premier League	4	0	1	0	–		5	0
Career total			109	4	3	0	0	0	112	4
