= Vagiz Galiulin =

Uzbekistani footballer (born 1987)

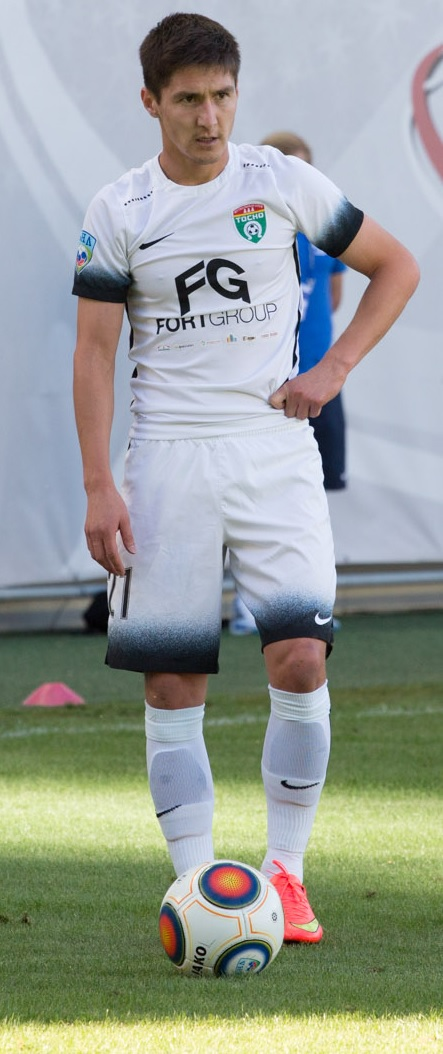
- Galiulin with Tosno in 2016

Personal information
- Full name: Vagiz Iskandarovich Galiulin
- Date of birth: 10 October 1987 (age 39)
- Place of birth: Leninsk, Uzbek SSR, Soviet Union
- Height: 1.74 m (5 ft 9 in)
- Position: Midfielder

Team information
- Current team: FC Kattaqoʻrgʻon
- Number: 21

Senior career*
| Years | Team | Apps | (Gls) |
| 2004 | FK Andijon | 3 | (0) |
| 2005 | FK Buxoro | 1 | (0) |
| 2006 | Traktor Tashkent | | |
| 2006–2014 | FC Rubin Kazan | 8 | (0) |
| 2010–2012 | → FC Sibir Novosibirsk (loan) | 30 | (0) |
| 2012 | → FC Neftekhimik Nizhnekamsk (loan) | 19 | (2) |
| 2014–2016 | FC Ufa | 32 | (0) |
| 2016–2018 | FC Tosno | 63 | (9) |
| 2018–2020 | FC Tambov | 11 | (0) |
| 2019–2020 | → FC Neftekhimik Nizhnekamsk (loan) | 21 | (1) |
| 2020–2024 | FC Neftekhimik Nizhnekamsk | 111 | (13) |
| 2024–2025 | FK Andijon | 4 | (0) |
| 2026– | FC Kattaqorgon | 2 | (0) |

International career^{‡}
| 2008–2021 | Uzbekistan | 14 | (0) |
- * Club domestic league appearances and goals as of 30 November 2024 ‡ National team caps and goals as of 15 June 2021

Vagiz Galiulin (also spelled Galiullin; Russian: Вагиз Галиулин; born 10 October 1987) is an Uzbekistani footballer who plays as a midfielder.

== Career ==
=== Uzbek Leagues ===
He was a trainee of the Uzbek side FK Andijon. He made three appearances there before moving to FK Buxoro, where he made just one appearance.

=== Rubin Kazan ===
In 2006, he moved to the reserve team of Rubin Kazan for an unknown fee. He made his debut for FC Rubin Kazan on 7 March 2007 in quarter finals of the Russian Cup against FC Rostov. On 5 August 2008, he scored his first goal for Rubin in a Russian Cup Round of 32 game against FC Smena Komsomolsk-na-Amure. Rubin reached the final in that edition of the cup, but Galiulin did not play in any rounds other than their first one. He made his debut in the Russian Premier League on 16 November 2008 in a match against CSKA Moscow.

In 2010, he helped FC Rubin Kazan to win the CIS Cup. After this, he spent two seasons on loan with FC Sibir Novosibirsk, making 30 appearances.

In July 2012, he moved on loan to FC Neftekhimik Nizhnekamsk, making 19 appearances and scoring 2 goals.

On 25 July 2013, after a break of three seasons without playing for Rubin's senior team, Galiulin started the second leg of a UEFA Europa League tie against FK Jagodina. He had a bright game and assisted Gökdeniz Karadeniz to score the only goal of the game.

=== FC Tosno ===
He played as FC Tosno won the 2017–18 Russian Cup final against FC Avangard Kursk on 9 May 2018 in the Volgograd Arena.

== International career ==
Galiulin is an Uzbek international with 11 caps to his name. He made his national team debut in September 2008, as a substitute in a 3–0 loss to Qatar.

In 2011, with the Uzbekistan national team, he finished fourth place in the Asian Cup.

== Honours ==
Tosno

- Russian Cup: 2017–18

== Career statistics ==
As of 13 May 2018

| Club | Season | League | | | Cup | | Continental | | Other | | Total | |
| Club | Season | Division | Apps | Goals | Apps | Goals | Apps | Goals | Apps | Goals | Apps | Goals |
|---|---|---|---|---|---|---|---|---|---|---|---|---|
| FC Andijon | 2004 | Uzbek League | 3 | 0 | 0 | 0 | – | | – | | 3 | 0 |
| FK Buxoro | 2005 | Uzbek League | 1 | 0 | 0 | 0 | – | | – | | 1 | 0 |
| FC Rubin Kazan | 2006 | Premier Liga | 0 | 0 | 0 | 0 | 0 | 0 | – | | 0 | 0 |
| FC Rubin Kazan | 2007 | Premier Liga | 0 | 0 | 1 | 0 | – | | – | | 1 | 0 |
| FC Rubin Kazan | 2008 | Premier Liga | 1 | 0 | 1 | 1 | – | | – | | 2 | 1 |
| FC Rubin Kazan | 2009 | Premier Liga | 0 | 0 | 1 | 0 | 0 | 0 | – | | 1 | 0 |
| FC Rubin Kazan | 2010 | Premier Liga | 7 | 0 | 1 | 0 | 0 | 0 | 1 (Note: One appearance in the Russian Super Cup) | 0 | 9 | 0 |
| FC Sibir Novosibirsk | 2010 | Premier Liga | 11 | 0 | 0 | 0 | 0 | 0 | – | | 11 | 0 |
| FC Sibir Novosibirsk | 2011–12 | FNL | 19 | 0 | 0 | 0 | – | | – | | 19 | 0 |
| FC Sibir Novosibirsk | Total | | 30 | 0 | 0 | 0 | 0 | 0 | 0 | 0 | 30 | 0 |
| FC Neftekhimik Nizhnekamsk | 2012–13 | FNL | 19 | 2 | 0 | 0 | – | | – | | 19 | 2 |
| FC Rubin Kazan | 2012–13 | Premier Liga | 0 | 0 | 0 | 0 | 0 | 0 | – | | 0 | 0 |
| FC Rubin Kazan | 2013–14 | Premier Liga | 0 | 0 | 0 | 0 | 1 | 0 | – | | 1 | 0 |
| FC Rubin Kazan | Total (2 spells) | | 8 | 0 | 4 | 1 | 1 | 0 | 1 | 0 | 14 | 1 |
| FC Ufa | 2014–15 | Premier Liga | 23 | 0 | 1 | 0 | – | | – | | 24 | 0 |
| FC Ufa | 2015–16 | Premier Liga | 9 | 0 | 2 | 0 | – | | – | | 11 | 0 |
| FC Ufa | Total | | 32 | 0 | 3 | 0 | 0 | 0 | 0 | 0 | 35 | 0 |
| FC Tosno | 2015–16 | FNL | 9 | 2 | 0 | 0 | – | | – | | 9 | 2 |
| FC Tosno | 2016–17 | FNL | 31 | 4 | 3 | 1 | – | | – | | 34 | 5 |
| FC Tosno | 2017–18 | Premier Liga | 23 | 3 | 4 | 1 | – | | – | | 27 | 4 |
| FC Tosno | Total | | 63 | 9 | 7 | 2 | 0 | 0 | 0 | 0 | 70 | 11 |
| Career total | | | 156 | 11 | 14 | 3 | 1 | 0 | 1 | 0 | 172 | 14 |
