= 2012–13 FC Spartak Moscow season =

Spartak Moscow
2012–13 season
- Chairman: Leonid Fedun
- Manager: Unai Emery (until 25 November 2012); Valery Karpin (from 26 November 2012)
- Stadium: Luzhniki Stadium
- Russian Premier League: 4th
- Russian Cup: Round of 16 vs Rostov
- UEFA Champions League: Group stage
- Top goalscorer: League: Dmitri Kombarov (7 goals); All: Emmanuel Emenike; Dmitri Kombarov (8 each)
- Highest home attendance: 67,325 vs Barcelona; 20 November 2012
- Lowest home attendance: 7,969 vs Mordovia Saransk; 27 October 2012
- Average home league attendance: 23,368
Home colours	Away colours

The 2012–13 Spartak Moscow season was the club's 21st season in the Russian Premier League, the highest tier of association football in Russia. They finished the season in fourth place, qualifying for the UEFA Europa League; reached the round of 16 in the Russian Cup; and were knocked out 2012–13 UEFA Champions League at the group stage.

Spartak started the season under the management of Unai Emery, who they appointed as manager in June 2012 after Valery Karpin resigned following the completion of the previous season. Emery lasted five months before being sacked on 25 November, and Karpin was appointed caretaker manager before being handed the job permanently on 13 December 2012.

== Squad ==
As of match played 25 May 2013

No.	Name	Nationality	Position	Date of birth (age)	Signed from	Signed in	Contract ends	Apps.	Goals
Goalkeepers
30	Sergei Pesyakov	(Russia)	GK	28 May 1988 (aged 24)	Shinnik Yaroslavl	2009		17	0
31	Andriy Dykan	(Ukraine)	GK	16 July 1977 (aged 35)	Terek Grozny	2010		84	0
32	Artyom Rebrov	(Russia)	GK	4 March 1984 (aged 29)	Shinnik Yaroslavl	2011		16	0
42	Sergei Chernyshuk	(Russia)	GK	22 February 1992 (aged 21)	Youth Team	2010		0	0
91	Anton Mitryushkin	(Russia)	GK	8 February 1996 (aged 17)	Youth Team	2012		0	0
95	Vladislav Teryoshkin	(Russia)	GK	16 July 1995 (aged 17)	Youth Team	2012		0	0
Defenders
3	Sergei Bryzgalov	(Russia)	DF	15 November 1992 (aged 20)	Saturn Ramenskoye	2011		34	1
5	Nicolás Pareja	(Argentina)	DF	19 January 1984 (aged 29)	Espanyol	2010		61	3
7	Kirill Kombarov	(Russia)	DF	22 January 1987 (aged 26)	Dynamo Moscow	2010		74	3
15	Sergei Parshivlyuk	(Russia)	DF	18 March 1989 (aged 24)	Youth Team	2007		97	1
17	Marek Suchý	(Czech Republic)	DF	29 March 1988 (aged 25)	Slavia Prague	2010		101	4
18	Ilya Kutepov	(Russia)	DF	29 July 1993 (aged 19)	Akademiya Tolyatti	2012		1	0
23	Dmitri Kombarov	(Russia)	DF	22 January 1987 (aged 26)	Dynamo Moscow	2010		108	18
33	Salvatore Bocchetti	(Italy)	DF	30 November 1986 (aged 26)	Rubin Kazan	2013		10	0
34	Yevgeni Makeyev	(Russia)	DF	24 July 1989 (aged 23)	Youth Team	2008		128	4
44	Soslan Gatagov	(Russia)	DF	29 September 1992 (aged 20)	Lokomotiv Moscow	2012		5	0
45	Aleksandr Putsko	(Russia)	DF	24 February 1993 (aged 20)	Youth Team	2010		1	0
48	Aleksandr Stepanov	(Russia)	DF	10 January 1994 (aged 19)	Youth team	2011		0	0
50	Ivan Khomukha	(Russia)	DF	14 July 1994 (aged 18)	Youth Team	2010		0	0
55	Nikolai Fadeyev	(Russia)	DF	9 May 1993 (aged 20)	Youth Team	2010		1	0
58	Yaroslav Shmygov	(Russia)	DF	6 April 1994 (aged 19)	Youth team	2012		0	0
62	Aydar Lisinkov	(Russia)	DF	2 January 1994 (aged 19)	Youth team	2012		0	0
64	Denis Kutin	(Russia)	DF	5 October 1993 (aged 19)	Youth Team	2010		0	0
71	Aleksandr Likhachyov	(Russia)	DF	22 July 1996 (aged 16)	Youth team	2012		0	0
74	Valentin Vinnichenko	(Russia)	DF	21 April 1995 (aged 18)	Youth team	2012		0	0
75	Aleksei Grechkin	(Russia)	DF	6 February 1996 (aged 17)	Youth team	2012		0	0
78	Yevgeni Yezhov	(Russia)	DF	11 February 1995 (aged 18)	Youth team	2012		0	0
82	Anton Fedotov	(Russia)	DF	29 March 1996 (aged 17)	Youth team	2012		0	0
89	Yegor Yevteyev	(Russia)	DF	1 April 1996 (aged 17)	Youth team	2012		0	0
Midfielders
2	Juan Insaurralde	(Argentina)	MF	3 October 1984 (aged 28)	Boca Juniors	2012		19	1
6	Rafael Carioca	(Brazil)	MF	18 June 1989 (aged 23)	Grêmio	2009	2013	108	2
8	Aiden McGeady	(Republic of Ireland)	MF	4 April 1986 (aged 27)	Celtic	2010	2014	80	12
19	José Jurado	(Spain)	MF	29 June 1986 (aged 26)	loan from Schalke 04	2012		24	3
21	Kim Källström	(Sweden)	MF	24 August 1982 (aged 30)	Lyon	2012		27	2
25	Diniyar Bilyaletdinov	(Russia)	MF	27 February 1985 (aged 28)	Everton	2012		27	4
37	Rômulo	(Brazil)	MF	19 September 1990 (aged 22)	Vasco da Gama	2012		7	1
40	Artyom Timofeyev	(Russia)	MF	12 January 1994 (aged 19)	Your team	2012		0	0
49	Jano Ananidze	(Georgia (country))	MF	10 October 1992 (aged 20)	Youth Team	2009		76	11
51	Dmitri Kayumov	(Russia)	MF	11 May 1992 (aged 21)	Youth Team	2009		1	0
47	Andrei Svyatov	(Russia)	MF	2 May 1993 (aged 20)	Your team	2012		0	0
52	Igor Leontyev	(Russia)	MF	18 March 1994 (aged 19)	Your team	2011		0	0
53	Artyom Samsonov	(Russia)	MF	5 January 1994 (aged 19)	Your team	2011		0	0
54	Ilnur Alshin	(Russia)	MF	31 August 1993 (aged 19)	Nara-ShBFR Naro-Fominsk	2011		0	0
59	Roman Kuzovkin	(Russia)	MF	19 October 1994 (aged 18)	Your team	2011		0	0
60	Konstantin Savichev	(Russia)	MF	6 March 1994 (aged 19)	Your team	2011		0	0
61	Vladimir Zubarev	(Russia)	MF	5 January 1993 (aged 20)	Youth team	2010		0	0
65	Anatoliy Zykov	(Russia)	MF	14 February 1994 (aged 19)	Your team	2011		0	0
73	Ayaz Guliyev	(Russia)	MF	27 November 1996 (aged 16)	Youth team	2012		0	0
76	Pavel Globa	(Russia)	MF	31 May 1995 (aged 17)	Youth team	2012		0	0
79	Vladislav Masternoy	(Russia)	MF	17 November 1995 (aged 17)	Youth team	2012		0	0
86	Danila Buranov	(Russia)	MF	11 February 1996 (aged 17)	Youth team	2012		0	0
88	Maxim Yermakov	(Russia)	MF	21 April 1995 (aged 18)	Youth team	2012		0	0
90	Ognjen Vukojević	(Croatia)	MF	20 December 1983 (aged 29)	loan from Dynamo Kyiv	2013		9	0
92	Vladislav Panteleyev	(Russia)	MF	15 August 1996 (aged 16)	Youth team	2012		0	0
94	Aghvan Papikyan	(Armenia)	MF	8 February 1994 (aged 19)	loan from ŁKS Łódź	2013	2013	0	0
99	Vladlen Babayev	(Russia)	MF	12 October 1996 (aged 16)	Youth team	2012		0	0
Forwards
9	Ari	(Brazil)	FW	1 December 1985 (aged 27)	AZ	2010		110	28
10	Artem Dzyuba	(Russia)	FW	22 August 1988 (aged 24)	Youth Team	2006		144	28
12	Yura Movsisyan	(Armenia)	FW	2 August 1987 (aged 25)	Krasnodar	2012		8	4
14	Pavel Yakovlev	(Russia)	FW	7 April 1991 (aged 22)	Youth Team	2008		58	8
22	Aleksandr Kozlov	(Russia)	FW	19 March 1993 (aged 20)	Youth team	2009		27	1
28	Majeed Waris	(Ghana)	FW	19 September 1991 (aged 21)	BK Häcken	2013		7	0
29	Emmanuel Emenike	(Nigeria)	FW	10 May 1987 (aged 26)	Fenerbahçe	2011		47	18
57	Vyacheslav Krotov	(Russia)	FW	1 January 1991 (aged 22)	Volgar Astrakhan	2012		1	0
67	Artyom Fedchuk	(Russia)	FW	20 December 1994 (aged 18)	Youth team	2011		0	0
69	Denis Davydov	(Russia)	FW	22 March 1995 (aged 18)	Youth team	2012		0	0
70	Ippei Shinozuka	(Japan)	FW	20 March 1995 (aged 18)	Youth team	2012		0	0
80	Valeriy Zgibartsa	(Russia)	FW	20 April 1995 (aged 18)	Youth team	2012		0	0
Away on loan
1	Nikolai Zabolotny	(Russia)	GK	16 April 1990 (aged 23)	Youth Team	2010		7	0
4	Emin Mahmudov	(Russia)	MF	27 April 1992 (aged 21)	Saturn Ramenskoye	2011		17	0
11	Welliton	(Brazil)	FW	22 October 1986 (aged 26)	Goiás	2007		125	60
16	Demy de Zeeuw	(Netherlands)	MF	26 May 1983 (aged 29)	AFC Ajax	2011		33	3
27	Aleksandr Zotov	(Russia)	MF	27 August 1990 (aged 22)	Youth Team	2008		17	0
41	Vladimir Obukhov	(Russia)	FW	8 February 1992 (aged 21)	Youth Team	2008		4	0
	Soslan Dzhanayev	(Russia)	GK	13 March 1987 (aged 26)	KAMAZ	2008		41	0
	Filip Ozobić	(Croatia)	MF	8 April 1991 (aged 22)	Youth Team	2009		4	0
	Anton Khodyrev	(Russia)	MF	26 January 1992 (aged 21)	Youth Team	2009		4	0
	Dmitri Khlebosolov	(Belarus)	FW	7 October 1990 (aged 22)	Baranovichi	2009		0	0
Players that left Spartak Moscow during the season
31	Konstantin Sovetkin	(Russia)	MF	19 February 1989 (aged 24)	Youth Team	2008		6	0
38	Artur Maloyan	(Russia)	MF	4 February 1989 (aged 24)	Youth Team	2007		9	1
39	Igor Gorbatenko	(Russia)	MF	13 February 1989 (aged 24)	Krylia Sovetov-SOK Dimitrovgrad	2008		7	0
68	Ivan Konovalov	(Russia)	GK	18 August 1994 (aged 18)	Youth Team	2012		0	0

=== On loan ===
Note: Flags indicate national team as defined under FIFA eligibility rules; some limited exceptions apply. Players may hold more than one non-FIFA nationality.

No.	Pos.	Nation	Player
1	GK	RUS	Nikolai Zabolotny (at Rostov)
4	MF	RUS	Emin Mahmudov (at Krylia Sovetov)
11	FW	BRA	Welliton (at Grêmio)
16	MF	NED	Demy de Zeeuw (at Anderlecht)
27	MF	RUS	Aleksandr Zotov (at Tom Tomsk)

No.	Pos.	Nation	Player
41	FW	RUS	Vladimir Obukhov (at Torpedo Moscow)
—	GK	RUS	Soslan Dzhanayev (at Alania Vladikavkaz)
—	MF	CRO	Filip Ozobić (at Hajduk Split)
—	MF	RUS	Anton Khodyrev (at Sibir Novosibirsk)
—	FW	BLR	Dmitri Khlebosolov (at Dynamo Dresden)

=== Left club during season ===
Note: Flags indicate national team as defined under FIFA eligibility rules; some limited exceptions apply. Players may hold more than one non-FIFA nationality.

No.	Pos.	Nation	Player
31	MF	RUS	Konstantin Sovetkin (to Metallurg-Oskol Stary Oskol)
38	MF	RUS	Artur Maloyan (to Shinnik Yaroslavl)

No.	Pos.	Nation	Player
39	MF	RUS	Igor Gorbatenko (to Shinnik Yaroslavl)
68	GK	RUS	Ivan Konovalov (to Amkar Perm)

== Transfers ==
=== In ===
Date	Position	Nationality	Name	From	Fee	Ref.
10 June 2012	DF	(Russia)	Ilya Kutepov	Akademiya Tolyatti	Undisclosed	
2 July 2012	MF	(Brazil)	Rômulo	Vasco da Gama	Undisclosed	
20 July 2012	FW	(Russia)	Vyacheslav Krotov	Volgar Astrakhan	Undisclosed	
1 August 2012	MF	(Argentina)	Juan Insaurralde	Boca Juniors	Undisclosed	
1 August 2012	MF	(Sweden)	Kim Källström	Lyon	Undisclosed	
10 November 2012	FW	(Ghana)	Majeed Waris	BK Häcken	Undisclosed	
13 December 2012	FW	(Armenia)	Yura Movsisyan	Krasnodar	Undisclosed	
28 January 2013	DF	(Italy)	Salvatore Bocchetti	Rubin Kazan	Undisclosed	

=== Loans in ===
Date from	Position	Nationality	Name	From	Date to	Ref.
4 September 2012	MF	(Spain)	José Jurado	Schalke 04	30 June 2013	
January 2013	MF	(Armenia)	Aghvan Papikyan	ŁKS Łódź	30 June 2013	
27 February 2013	MF	(Croatia)	Ognjen Vukojević	Dynamo Kyiv	30 June 2013	

=== Out ===
Date	Position	Nationality	Name	To	Fee	Ref.
15 June 2012	MF	(Russia)	Aleksandr Sheshukov	Rostov	Undisclosed	
20 July 2012	DF	(Argentina)	Marcos Rojo	Sporting CP	Undisclosed	
8 August 2012	DF	(Russia)	Fyodor Kudryashov	Terek Grozny	Undisclosed	
30 August 2012	MF	(Russia)	Igor Kireyev	Rostov	Undisclosed	
15 February 2013	MF	(Russia)	Artur Maloyan	Shinnik Yaroslavl	Undisclosed	

=== Loans out ===
Date from	Position	Nationality	Name	To	Date to	Ref.
26 June 2012	DF	(Russia)	Anton Khodyrev	Sibir Novosibirsk	31 May 2013	
23 July 2012	GK	(Russia)	Nikolai Zabolotny	Rostov	31 May 2013	
6 August 2012	FW	(Russia)	Aleksandr Kozlov	Khimki	31 May 2013	
23 January 2013	MF	(Netherlands)	Demy de Zeeuw	Anderlecht	30 June 2013	
29 January 2013	FW	(Belarus)	Dmitri Khlebosolov	Dynamo Dresden	30 June 2013	
6 February 2013	FW	(Brazil)	Welliton	Gremio	End of Season	
8 February 2013	FW	(Russia)	Vladimir Obukhov	Torpedo Moscow	31 May 2013	
14 February 2013	MF	(Russia)	Emin Makhmudov	Krylia Sovetov	31 December 2013	

=== Released ===
Date	Position	Nationality	Name	Joined	Date
30 June 2013	GK	(Russia)	Sergei Chernyshuk		
30 June 2013	MF	(Russia)	Roman Kuzovkin	Volga Nizhny Novgorod	
30 June 2013	MF	(Russia)	Anatoliy Zykov		
30 June 2013	FW	(Russia)	Valeriy Zgibartsa		
30 June 2013	FW	(Belarus)	Dmitri Khlebosolov	Gomel	
30 June 2013	FW	(Russia)	Ilnur Alshin	Fakel Voronezh	

== Friendlies ==
30 June 2012	Spartak Moscow	3 – 0	Torpedo Moscow	Moscow
15:00 MSK (UTC+4)	Welliton 26'; Bilyaletdinov 77'; Emenike 82'	Report		Stadium: Luzhniki Stadium

== Competitions ==
=== Russian Premier League ===
==== Results by round ====
Round	1	2	3	4	5	6	7	8	9	10	11	12	13	14	15	16	17	18	19	20	21	22	23	24	25	26	27	28	29	30
Ground	A	H	A	A	H	A	A	A	H	A	H	A	H	A	H	A	H	H	A	H	H	H	A	H	A	H	A	H	A	H
Result	W	W	W	L	W	L	L	D	W	W	L	L	W	W	W	D	L	L	W	W	D	D	L	W	D	W	L	D	W	W

Updated to match(es) played on 25 May 2013. Source: See Results
A = Away; H = Home; W = Win; D = Draw; L = Loss

==== Results ====
21 July 2012 1	Alania Vladikavkaz	1 – 2	Spartak Moscow	Vladikavkaz
20:00 MSK (UTC+4)	Priskin (yellow card) 10'; Khubulov 14'; Grigoryev (yellow card) 69'	Report	Emenike 1' de Zeeuw (yellow card) 15'; Suchý (yellow card) 21'; Welliton (yellow card) 69'; Pareja (yellow card) 75'; Grigoryev 86' (o.g.)	Stadium: Republican Spartak Stadium; Attendance: 28,500; Referee: Vitali Meshkov

28 July 2012 2	Spartak Moscow	2 – 1	Volga Nizhny Novgorod	Moscow
17:30 MSK (UTC+4)	Emenike (yellow card) 13'; McGeady (yellow card) 67' (goal) 69'; Suchý (yellow card) 70'; Pareja (yellow card) 82'; Carioca (yellow card) 82'; D.Kombarov 90+1' (pen.)	Report	Sapogov 33' (yellow card) 82'; Zaytsev (yellow card) 45+2'; Pleșan (yellow card) 65'	Stadium: Luzhniki Stadium; Attendance: 20,357; Referee: Sergey Kuznetsov

4 August 2012 3	Dynamo Moscow	0 – 4	Spartak Moscow	Khimki
21:00 MSK (UTC+4)	Wilkshire (yellow card) 48'; Kurányi (yellow card) 64'; Noboa (yellow card) 69' (yellow-red card) 76'	Report	Makeyev (yellow card) 11'; Bilyaletdinov 23'; Carioca (yellow card) 48' (goal) 90+3'; Pareja 49'; Ananidze 75'	Stadium: Arena Khimki; Attendance: 15,209; Referee: Maksim Layushkin

11 August 2012 4	Zenit St.Petersburg	5 – 0	Spartak Moscow	Saint Petersburg
13:30 MSK (UTC+4)	Kanunnikov 15'; Fayzulin (yellow card) 29' (goal) 67', 88'; Bystrov 52' (yellow card) 63'; Shirokov 61'	Report	de Zeeuw (yellow card) 50'; Gatagov (yellow card) 56'; Emenike (yellow card) 58'; Bilyaletdinov (penalty missed) 60'; McGeady (red card) 63'; Makeyev (yellow card) 72'; Suchý (yellow card) 83'; Welliton (yellow card) 90+2'	Stadium: Petrovsky Stadium; Attendance: 21,107; Referee: Mikhail Vilkov

18 August 2012 5	Spartak Moscow	2 – 1	Rubin Kazan	Moscow
13:30 MSK (UTC+4)	Rômulo 73'; Welliton (yellow card) 80'; D.Kombarov 84' (pen.)	Report	Natcho 36' (pen.); Rondón (yellow card) 47'; Kuzmin (yellow card) 80'	Stadium: Luzhniki Stadium; Attendance: 17,976; Referee: Aleksei Nikolaev

25 August 2012 6	Terek Grozny	2 – 1	Spartak Moscow	Grozny
18:30 MSK (UTC+4)	Makuszewski (yellow card) 38'; Lebedenko 80'; Ferreira 90+1' (yellow card) 90+2'	Report	de Zeeuw (yellow card) 40'; Makeyev (yellow card) 51'; Suchý (yellow card) 64'; Insaurralde 65'	Stadium: Sultan Bilimkhanov Stadium; Attendance: 21,700; Referee: Vladislav Bezborodov

1 September 2012 7	Lokomotiv Moscow	2 – 1	Spartak Moscow	Moscow
20:30 MSK (UTC+4)	N'Doye 60'; Pavlyuchenko 66'; Glushakov (yellow card) 70'; Krešić (yellow card) 90+4'; Ćorluka (yellow card) 90+5'	Report	D.Kombarov 6' de Zeeuw (yellow card) 14'; McGeady (yellow card) 36'; Carioca (yellow card) 59'; K.Kombarov (yellow card) 59'	Stadium: Lokomotiv Stadium; Attendance: 27,269; Referee: Aleksey Eskov

15 September 2012 8	Kuban Krasnodar	2 – 2	Spartak Moscow	Krasnodar
17:00 MSK (UTC+4)	Fidler 27'; Armaș (yellow card) 40'; Ibrahima (penalty missed) 45'; Özbiliz 63'; Prudnikov (yellow card) 89'	Report	McGeady 13'; Dzyuba (yellow card) 36'; Bilyaletdinov (yellow card) 42'; Suchý (yellow card) 44'; Emenike 53'	Stadium: Kuban Stadium; Attendance: 29,870; Referee: Mikhail Vilkov

23 September 2012 9	Spartak Moscow	3 – 1	Rostov	Moscow
15:00 MSK (UTC+4)	Suchý (yellow card) 10'; Emenike 27', 71'; Ari 64'; McGeady (yellow card) 67'	Report	Sheshukov (yellow card) 27'; Kirichenko (yellow card) 82'; Pongolle 88'	Stadium: Luzhniki Stadium; Attendance: 12,558; Referee: Sergey Lapochkin

29 September 2012 10	Amkar Perm	1 – 3	Spartak Moscow	Perm
16:30 MSK (UTC+4)	Ignatovich 22'; Novaković (yellow card) 43'; Narubin (red card) 49'; Nijholt (yellow card) 84'	Report	Källström 33'; Emenike (yellow card) 43'; Ari 67'; D.Kombarov (yellow card) 81'; Makeyev (yellow card) 86'; Dzyuba 90+6'	Stadium: Zvezda Stadium; Attendance: 16,500; Referee: Aleksandr Egorov

7 October 2012 11	Spartak Moscow	0 – 2	CSKA Moscow	Moscow
18:00 MSK (UTC+4)	Ari (yellow card) 45'; D.Kombarov (yellow card) 72'	Report	Musa 15'; Honda 72'; Ignashevich (yellow card) 79'	Stadium: Luzhniki Stadium; Attendance: 54,228; Referee: Aleksey Eskov

20 October 2012 12	Anzhi Makhachkala	2 – 1	Spartak Moscow	Makhachkala
13:30 MSK (UTC+4)	Boussoufa (yellow card) 41'; Eto'o (yellow card) 44'; Traoré 64'; Insaurralde 90+4' (o.g.)	Report	Welliton (yellow card) 32'; Bilyaletdinov 35'; Ari (yellow card) 38'; Källström (yellow card) 40'; K.Kombarov (yellow card) 45+1' (yellow-red card) 46'; Insaurralde (yellow card) 79'; Pesyakov (yellow card) 90'	Stadium: Dynamo Stadium; Attendance: 15,600; Referee: Eduard Malyi

27 October 2012 13	Spartak Moscow	2 – 0	Mordovia Saransk	Moscow
18:00 MSK (UTC+4)	Jurado 42'; Bilyaletdinov 65'	Report	Aldonin (yellow card) 56'	Stadium: Luzhniki Stadium; Attendance: 7,969; Referee: Sergei Ivanov

3 November 2012 14	Krylia Sovetov	0 – 5	Spartak Moscow	Samara
15:30 MSK (UTC+4)		Report	Jurado 12'; Pareja 38'; Carioca (yellow card) 59'; D.Kombarov 69'; Dzyuba 76'; Ananidze 83'	Stadium: Metallurg Stadium; Attendance: 10,140; Referee: Vladislav Bezborodov

11 November 2012 15	Spartak Moscow	2 – 0	Krasnodar	Moscow
20:15 MSK (UTC+4)	Ari 55' (yellow card) 79'; Jurado (yellow card) 78'; D.Kombarov 88' (pen.)	Report	Martynovich (red card) 75'	Stadium: Luzhniki Stadium; Attendance: 8,102; Referee: Sergei Karasev

17 November 2012 16	Volga Nizhny Novgorod	1 – 1	Spartak Moscow	Nizhny Novgorod
13:30 MSK (UTC+4)	Belozyorov (yellow card) 12'; Grigalava (yellow card) 14'; Ajinjal (yellow card) 32'; Bibilov (yellow card) 42'; Salugin 45+3'; Sapogov (yellow card) 55'; Aydov (yellow card) 61'; Kerzhakov (yellow card) 90+3'	Report	D.Kombarov 14'; Bryzgalov (yellow card) 17'; Jurado (yellow card) 42'; Carioca (yellow card) 90+5'	Stadium: Lokomotiv Stadium; Attendance: 13,500; Referee: Vasiliy Kazartsev

25 November 2012 17	Spartak Moscow	1 – 5	Dynamo Moscow	Moscow
13:30 MSK (UTC+4)	Källström (yellow card) 14'; Suchý (yellow card) 23'; Ari (yellow card) 90'; Dzyuba 90+2'	Report	Kokorin 15', 45+1'; Noboa 18'; Dzsudzsák (yellow card) 26'; Chicherin (yellow card) 29'; Semshov 80', 88'	Stadium: Luzhniki Stadium; Attendance: 13,856; Referee: Maksim Layushkin

30 November 2012 18	Spartak Moscow	2 – 4	Zenit St.Petersburg	Moscow
20:30 MSK (UTC+4)	Dzyuba 26'; K.Kombarov (yellow card) 44'; Pareja (yellow card) 64' (yellow-red card) 69'; Emenike 81' (yellow card) 90+4'; Carioca (yellow card) 90'; Insaurralde (red card) 90+3'	Report	Hulk 21'; Witsel 41', 71'; Shirokov 78' (yellow card) 82'	Stadium: Luzhniki Stadium; Attendance: 13,251; Referee: Sergei Karasev

10 December 2012 19	Rubin Kazan	0 – 1	Spartak Moscow	Kazan
17:45 MSK (UTC+4)	Natcho (yellow card) 25'; Ansaldi (yellow card) 90'	Report	Makeyev (yellow card) 40'; McGeady (yellow card) 43' (goal) 60'; Dzyuba (yellow card) 90+4'	Stadium: Central Stadium; Attendance: 8,384; Referee: Vladislav Bezborodov

9 March 2013 20	Spartak Moscow	3 – 1	Terek Grozny	Moscow
13:30 MSK (UTC+4)	Movsisyan 2', 29', 76'; Källström (yellow card) 17'; Carioca (yellow card) 90+3'	Report	Yatchenko (yellow card) 23'; Ojala (yellow card) 32'; Utsiyev (yellow card) 45+1'; Maurício 78'	Stadium: Luzhniki Stadium; Attendance: 17,685; Referee: Aleksandr Egorov

16 March 2013 21	Spartak Moscow	0 – 0	Lokomotiv Moscow	Moscow
13:30 MSK (UTC+4)	Bocchetti (yellow card) 38'; Dzyuba (yellow card) 81'	Report	Samedov (yellow card) 35'; Tsiharaw (yellow card) 85'; Ďurica (yellow card) 89'	Stadium: Luzhniki Stadium; Attendance: 24,443; Referee: Sergey Karasev

30 March 2013 22	Spartak Moscow	2 – 2	Kuban Krasnodar	Moscow
20:15 MSK (UTC+4)	Kaboré 23' (o.g.); Jurado 82'	Report	Özbiliz 56'; Bucur 63'	Stadium: Luzhniki Stadium; Attendance: 13,651; Referee: Maksim Layushkin

6 April 2013 23	Rostov	1 – 0	Spartak Moscow	Rostov-on-Don
16:30 MSK (UTC+4)	Kisenkov (yellow card) 11'; Kalachev (yellow card) 15'; Lazović 50' (pen.); Kanga (yellow card) 51'; Dyakov (yellow card) 67'; Xulu (yellow card) 87'	Report	D.Kombarov (yellow card) 15'	Stadium: Olimp - 2 Attendance: 15,830; Referee: Sergey Lapochkin

13 April 2013 24	Spartak Moscow	2 – 0	Amkar Perm	Moscow
16:30 MSK (UTC+4)	Yakovlev 20'; Movsisyan 68'; Bocchetti (yellow card) 80'; Ari (yellow card) 82'	Report	Belorukov (yellow card) 46'	Stadium: Luzhniki Stadium; Attendance: 12,876; Referee: Sergei Ivanov

20 April 2013 25	CSKA Moscow	2 – 2	Spartak Moscow	Moscow
13:30 MSK (UTC+4)	Ignashevich (yellow card) 42'; Vágner Love (penalty missed) 50'; Musa 73'; Wernbloom (yellow card) 84'; Dzagoev 90+4' (pen.)	Report	Vukojević (yellow card) 16'; McGeady 42' (yellow card) 48'; Ari 46'; Waris (yellow card) 82'; Bocchetti (yellow card) 86'; Suchý (yellow card) 90+2'; Carioca (yellow card) 90+2' (yellow-red card) 90+4'; Dykan (yellow card) 90+6'	Stadium: Luzhniki Stadium; Attendance: 67,740; Referee: Sergey Karasev

28 April 2013 26	Spartak Moscow	2 – 0	Anzhi Makhachkala	Moscow
13:30 MSK (UTC+4)	Källström 5'; Vukojević (yellow card) 27'; D.Kombarov 69' (pen.)	Report	Spahić (yellow card) 24'; Agalarov (yellow card) 50'; Gabulov (red card) 66'; Smolov (yellow card) 88'	Stadium: Luzhniki Stadium; Attendance: 18,467; Referee: Aleksei Nikolaev

4 May 2013 27	Mordovia Saransk	2 – 1	Spartak Moscow	Saransk
18:00 MSK (UTC+4)	Božović (yellow card) 40'; Pazin 49'; Oprița 70'; Yurchenko (yellow card) 85'	Report	McGeady 6' (red card) 40'; Makeyev (yellow card) 48'; Jurado (yellow card) 58'; Bocchetti (yellow card) 86'	Stadium: Start Stadium; Attendance: 11,565; Referee: Sergei Ivanov

11 May 2013 28	Spartak Moscow	1 – 1	Krylia Sovetov	Moscow
20:00 MSK (UTC+4)	Suchý 31'; Yakovlev (yellow card) 37'	Report	Nemov 8'; Drahun (yellow card) 33'; Goreux (yellow card) 42'	Stadium: Luzhniki Stadium; Attendance: 16,567; Referee: Aleksandr Yegorov

18 May 2013 29	Krasnodar	0 – 1	Spartak Moscow	Krasnodar
19:30 MSK (UTC+4)	Abreu (yellow card) 24'; Shipitsin (yellow card) 63'; Nakhushev (yellow card) 70'; Joãozinho (yellow card) 89'	Report	Jurado (yellow card) 41'; D.Kombarov (penalty missed) 72'; Yakovlev 75'; Vukojević (yellow card) 85'; Dykan (yellow card) 90+4'	Stadium: Kuban Stadium; Attendance: 22,000; Referee: Vitali Meshkov

25 May 2013 30	Spartak Moscow	2 – 0	Alania Vladikavkaz	Moscow
13:30 MSK (UTC+4)	Bocchetti (yellow card) 18'; Bryzgalov 26'; K.Kombarov (yellow card) 53'; Ananidze 79'	Report	Dudiyev (yellow card) 47'; Goore (red card) 66'	Stadium: Eduard Streltsov Stadium; Attendance: 8,500; Referee: Aleksei Nikolaev

==== Table ====
Pos	Team	Pld	W	D	L	GF	GA	GD	Pts	Qualification or relegation
2	Zenit St. Petersburg	30	18	8	4	53	25	+28	62	Qualification for the Champions League third qualifying round
3	Anzhi Makhachkala	30	15	8	7	45	34	+11	53	Qualification for the Europa League group stage
4	Spartak Moscow	30	15	6	9	51	39	+12	51	Qualification to Europa League play-off round
5	Kuban Krasnodar	30	14	9	7	48	28	+20	51	Qualification for the Europa League third qualifying round
6	Rubin Kazan	30	15	5	10	39	27	+12	50	Qualification for the Europa League second qualifying round

Source: Russian Premier League
Rules for classification: 1) points; 2) number of wins; 3) head-to-head points; 4) number of head-to-head wins; 5) head-to-head goal difference; 6) number of head-to-head goals scored; 7) number of head-to-head away goals scored; 8) goal difference; 9) number of goals scored; 10) number of away goals scored; 11) position in the 2011–12 season (only used until all the regularly scheduled games have been played); 11) extra play-off game or tournament between the teams in question.

=== Russian Cup ===
26 September 2012 Round of 32	Salyut Belgorod	1 – 2	Spartak Moscow	Belgorod
20:00 MSK (UTC+4)	Mosquera 22'; Alborov (yellow card) 44'; Tsukanov (yellow card) 79' (yellow-red card) 90'; Starkov (yellow card) 90'	Report	Ananidze 33' de Zeeuw 53'; Källström (yellow card) 63'	Stadium: Salyut Stadium; Attendance: 7,000; Referee: Igor Nizovtsev

30 October 2012 Round of 16	Rostov	0 – 0 (a.e.t.) (3 – 2 p)	Spartak Moscow	Rostov-on-Don
20:00 MSK (UTC+4)	Pongolle (yellow card) 83'	Report	Makeyev (yellow card) 60'; K.Kombarov (yellow card) 93'	Stadium: Olimp – 2 Attendance: 10,100; Referee: Vasiliy Kazartsev
	Penalties
	Kirichenko (penalty scored); Saláta (penalty missed); Blatnjak (penalty missed); Dyakov (penalty scored); Kalachev (penalty scored)		Jurado (penalty missed); K.Kombarov (penalty missed); Ananidze (penalty scored); Insaurralde (penalty missed); Ari (penalty scored)

=== UEFA Champions League ===
==== Play-off round ====
21 August 2012 First leg	Spartak Moscow (Russia)	2 – 1	(Turkey) Fenerbahçe	Moscow, Russia
18:00 MSK (UTC+4)	Emenike 59'; D.Kombarov 69'; De Zeeuw (yellow card) 74'; Bilyaletdinov (yellow card) 76'	Report	Korkmaz (yellow card) 19'; Kuyt 65' (yellow card) 90'	Stadium: Luzhniki Stadium; Attendance: 31,600; Referee: Martin Atkinson (England)

29 August 2012 Second leg	Fenerbahçe (Turkey)	1 – 1 (2 – 3 agg.)	(Russia) Spartak Moscow	Istanbul, Turkey
20:45 MSK (UTC+4)	Topuz (yellow card) 29'; Kuyt (yellow card) 33'; Sow 69'; Korkmaz (yellow card) 85'	Report	Ari 6'; De Zeeuw (yellow card) 15' (yellow-red card) 81'; K.Kombarov (yellow card) 36'; Dzyuba (yellow card) 85'	Stadium: Şükrü Saracoğlu Stadium; Attendance: 40,387; Referee: Felix Brych (Germany)

==== Group stage ====
Pos	Team	Pld	W	D	L	GF	GA	GD	Pts	Qualification	BAR	CEL	BEN	SPM
1	(Spain) Barcelona	6	4	1	1	11	5	+6	13	Advance to knockout phase	—	2–1	0–0	3–2
2	(Scotland) Celtic	6	3	1	2	9	8	+1	10	Advance to knockout phase	2–1	—	0–0	2–1
3	(Portugal) Benfica	6	2	2	2	5	5	0	8	Transfer to Europa League	0–2	2–1	—	2–0
4	(Russia) Spartak Moscow	6	1	0	5	7	14	−7	3		0–3	2–3	2–1	—

Source: Soccerway

19 September 2012 1	Barcelona (Spain)	3 – 2	(Russia) Spartak Moscow	Barcelona, Spain
22:45 MSK (UTC+4)	Tello 14'; Song (yellow card) 34'; Messi 72', 80'	Report	Alves 29' (o.g.); K.Kombarov (yellow card) 31'; Källström (yellow card) 42'; Emenike (yellow card) 44'; Rômulo 58' (yellow card) 75'; Suchý (yellow card) 77'	Stadium: Camp Nou; Attendance: 73,580; Referee: Milorad Mažić (Serbia)

2 October 2012 2	Spartak Moscow (Russia)	2 – 3	(Scotland) Celtic	Moscow, Russia
20:00 MSK (UTC+4)	Emenike 41', 48'; Insaurralde (red card) 63'	Report	Hooper 12'; Mulgrew (yellow card) 22'; Wanyama (yellow card) 30'; D.Kombarov 71' (o.g.); Samaras 90'	Stadium: Luzhniki Stadium; Attendance: 43,351; Referee: Tony Chapron (France)

23 October 2012 3	Spartak Moscow (Russia)	2 – 1	(Portugal) Benfica	Moscow, Russia
20:00 MSK (UTC+4)	Carioca 3'; Jardel 43' (o.g.); Suchý (yellow card) 45'; Ari (yellow card) 90'; Welliton (yellow card) 90'	Report	Lima 33'; Cardozo (yellow card) 72'; Matić (yellow card) 76'	Stadium: Luzhniki Stadium; Attendance: 41,237; Referee: Mark Clattenburg (England)

7 November 2012 4	Benfica (Portugal)	2 – 0	(Russia) Spartak Moscow	Lisbon, Portugal
23:45 MSK (UTC+4)	Almeida (yellow card) 29'; Cardozo 55', 69'	Report	Rebrov (yellow card) 32'; Makeyev (yellow card) 33'; Pareja (yellow card) 38' (red card) 76'; Jurado (yellow card) 82'	Stadium: Estádio da Luz; Attendance: 36,448; Referee: Florian Meyer (Germany)

20 November 2012 5	Spartak Moscow (Russia)	0 – 3	(Spain) Barcelona	Moscow, Russia
21:00 MSK (UTC+4)	Carioca (yellow card) 62'; Källström (yellow card) 90+2'	Report	Alves 16'; Messi 27', 39'; Pedro (yellow card) 36'; Mascherano (yellow card) 90'	Stadium: Luzhniki Stadium; Attendance: 67,325; Referee: Ivan Bebek (Croatia)

5 December 2012 6	Celtic (Scotland)	2 – 1	(Russia) Spartak Moscow	Glasgow, Scotland
23:45 MSK (UTC+4)	Hooper 21'; Kayal (yellow card) 42'; Lustig (yellow card) 52'; Commons 81' (pen.)	Report	Ari 39'; Källström (yellow card) 57' (yellow-red card) 88'; D.Kombarov (yellow card) 75'; Carioca (yellow card) 82'; McGeady (yellow card) 86'	Stadium: Celtic Park; Attendance: 59,168; Referee: Felix Brych (Germany)

== Squad statistics ==
As of match played 25 May 2013

=== Appearances and goals ===
No.	Pos	Nat	Player	Total		Premier League		Russian Cup		Champions League	
No.	Pos	Nat	Player	Apps	Goals	Apps	Goals	Apps	Goals	Apps	Goals
2	DF	(Argentina) ARG	Juan Insaurralde	19	1	10+1	1	2	0	6	0
3	DF	(Russia) RUS	Sergei Bryzgalov	16	1	10+1	1	2	0	0+3	0
5	DF	(Argentina) ARG	Nicolás Pareja	17	2	12	2	0	0	5	0
6	MF	(Brazil) BRA	Rafael Carioca	37	1	24+3	1	0+2	0	7+1	0
7	DF	(Russia) RUS	Kirill Kombarov	25	0	11+7	0	1	0	5+1	0
8	MF	(Republic of Ireland) IRL	Aiden McGeady	23	5	14+3	5	1	0	4+1	0
9	FW	(Brazil) BRA	Ari	37	4	21+6	4	0+2	0	8	0
10	FW	(Russia) RUS	Artem Dzyuba	32	4	18+7	4	1	0	1+5	0
12	FW	(Armenia) ARM	Yura Movsisyan	8	4	6+2	4	0	0	0	0
14	FW	(Russia) RUS	Pavel Yakovlev	17	2	7+9	2	1	0	0	0
17	DF	(Czech Republic) CZE	Marek Suchý	29	1	20+1	1	1	0	6+1	0
18	DF	(Russia) RUS	Ilya Kutepov	1	0	0+1	0	0	0	0	0
19	MF	(Spain) ESP	José Jurado	24	3	15+3	3	0+1	0	4+1	0
21	MF	(Sweden) SWE	Kim Källström	27	2	16+4	2	1	0	6	0
22	FW	(Russia) RUS	Aleksandr Kozlov	2	0	0+1	0	0	0	0+1	0
23	DF	(Russia) RUS	Dmitri Kombarov	37	7	29	7	0	0	8	0
25	MF	(Russia) RUS	Diniyar Bilyaletdinov	19	3	10+4	3	1	0	3+1	0
28	FW	(Ghana) GHA	Majeed Waris	7	0	2+5	0	0	0	0	0
29	FW	(Nigeria) NGA	Emmanuel Emenike	23	5	10+6	5	1	0	6	0
30	GK	(Russia) RUS	Sergei Pesyakov	11	0	7+1	0	1	0	2	0
31	GK	(Ukraine) UKR	Andriy Dykan	23	0	19	0	0	0	4	0
32	GK	(Russia) RUS	Artyom Rebrov	7	0	4	0	1	0	2	0
33	DF	(Italy) ITA	Salvatore Bocchetti	10	0	10	0	0	0	0	0
34	DF	(Russia) RUS	Yevgeni Makeyev	31	0	21+1	0	2	0	6+1	0
37	MF	(Brazil) BRA	Rômulo	7	1	4	1	0	0	3	0
44	DF	(Russia) RUS	Soslan Gatagov	1	0	1	0	0	0	0	0
45	DF	(Russia) RUS	Aleksandr Putsko	1	0	0	0	1	0	0	0
49	MF	(Georgia (country)) GEO	Jano Ananidze	20	4	6+9	3	2	1	1+2	0
51	MF	(Russia) RUS	Dmitri Kayumov	1	0	0	0	1	0	0	0
55	DF	(Russia) RUS	Nikolai Fadeyev	1	0	0	0	1	0	0	0
57	FW	(Russia) RUS	Vyacheslav Krotov	1	0	0	0	1	0	0	0
90	MF	(Croatia) CRO	Ognjen Vukojević	9	0	7+2	0	0	0	0	0
Players away from the club on loan:
4	MF	(Russia) RUS	Emin Mahmudov	1	0	0+1	0	0	0	0	0
11	FW	(Brazil) BRA	Welliton	11	0	4+4	0	0	0	0+3	0
20	MF	(Netherlands) NED	Demy de Zeeuw	17	1	9+3	0	2	1	2+1	0
41	FW	(Russia) RUS	Vladimir Obukhov	1	0	1	0	0	0	0	0
Players who appeared for Spartak Moscow but left during the season:
39	MF	(Russia) RUS	Igor Gorbatenko	5	0	3+1	0	1	0	0	0

=== Goal scorers ===
Place	Position	Nation	Number	Name	Premier League	Russian Cup	UEFA Champions League	Total
1	MF	(Russia)	23	Dmitri Kombarov	7	0	1	8
1	FW	(Nigeria)	29	Emmanuel Emenike	5	0	3	8
3	FW	(Brazil)	9	Ari	4	0	2	6
4	MF	(Republic of Ireland)	8	Aiden McGeady	5	0	0	5
5	MF	(Russia)	10	Artem Dzyuba	4	0	0	4
5	FW	(Armenia)	12	Yura Movsisyan	4	0	0	4
5	MF	(Georgia (country))	49	Jano Ananidze	3	1	0	4
8	MF	(Spain)	19	José Jurado	3	0	0	3
8	MF	(Russia)	25	Diniyar Bilyaletdinov	3	0	0	3
10	DF	(Argentina)	5	Nicolás Pareja	2	0	0	2
10	FW	(Russia)	14	Pavel Yakovlev	2	0	0	2
10	MF	(Sweden)	21	Kim Källström	2	0	0	2
10	MF	(Brazil)	37	Rômulo	1	0	1	2
10	MF	(Brazil)	6	Rafael Carioca	1	0	1	2
10				Own goal	0	0	2	2
16	DF	(Czech Republic)	17	Marek Suchý	1	0	0	1
16	FW	(Argentina)	2	Juan Insaurralde	1	0	0	1
16	DF	(Russia)	3	Sergei Bryzgalov	1	0	0	1
16	MF	(Netherlands)	20	Demy de Zeeuw	0	1	0	1
				TOTALS	51	2	10	63

=== Clean sheets ===
Place	Position	Nation	Number	Name	Premier League	Russian Cup	UEFA Champions League	Total
1	GK	(Ukraine)	31	Andriy Dykan	5	0	0	5
2	GK	(Russia)	32	Artyom Rebrov	3	1	0	4
3	GK	(Russia)	30	Sergei Pesyakov	2	0	0	2
				TOTALS	10	1	0	11

=== Disciplinary record ===
Number	Nation	Position	Name	Premier League		Russian Cup		UEFA Champions League		Total	
Number	Nation	Position	Name	Booked	Sent off (straight red)	Booked	Sent off (straight red)	Booked	Sent off (straight red)	Booked	Sent off (straight red)
2	(Argentina)	MF	Juan Insaurralde	1	1	0	0	0	1	1	2
3	(Russia)	DF	Sergei Bryzgalov	1	0	0	0	0	0	1	0
5	(Argentina)	DF	Nicolás Pareja	4	1	0	0	1	1	5	2
6	(Brazil)	MF	Rafael Carioca	9	1	0	0	2	0	11	1
7	(Russia)	MF	Kirill Kombarov	5	1	0	0	2	0	7	1
8	(Republic of Ireland)	MF	Aiden McGeady	5	2	0	0	1	0	6	2
9	(Brazil)	FW	Ari	5	0	0	0	1	0	6	0
10	(Russia)	FW	Artem Dzyuba	3	0	0	0	1	0	4	0
14	(Russia)	FW	Pavel Yakovlev	1	0	0	0	0	0	1	0
17	(Czech Republic)	DF	Marek Suchý	8	0	0	0	2	0	10	0
19	(Spain)	MF	José Jurado	4	0	0	0	1	0	5	0
21	(Sweden)	MF	Kim Källström	3	0	0	0	4	1	7	1
23	(Russia)	MF	Dmitri Kombarov	3	0	0	0	1	0	4	0
25	(Russia)	MF	Diniyar Bilyaletdinov	1	0	0	0	1	0	2	0
28	(Ghana)	FW	Majeed Waris	1	0	0	0	0	0	1	0
29	(Nigeria)	FW	Emmanuel Emenike	4	0	0	0	1	0	5	0
30	(Russia)	GK	Sergei Pesyakov	1	0	0	0	0	0	1	0
31	(Ukraine)	GK	Andriy Dykan	1	0	0	0	0	0	2	0
32	(Russia)	GK	Sergei Pesyakov	0	0	0	0	1	0	1	0
33	(Italy)	DF	Salvatore Bocchetti	5	0	0	0	0	0	5	0
34	(Russia)	DF	Yevgeni Makeyev	6	0	0	0	1	0	7	0
37	(Brazil)	MF	Rômulo	0	0	0	0	1	0	1	0
44	(Russia)	DF	Soslan Gatagov	1	0	0	0	0	0	1	0
90	(Croatia)	MF	Ognjen Vukojević	3	0	0	0	0	0	3	0
Players away on loan:
11	(Brazil)	FW	Welliton	4	0	0	0	1	0	5	0
20	(Netherlands)	MF	Demy de Zeeuw	4	0	0	0	3	1	7	1
Players who left Spartak Moscow season during the season:
			TOTALS	84	6	3	0	25	4	112	10
