= 2015–16 FC Spartak Moscow season =

Spartak Moscow
2015–16 season
- Chairman: Sergey Rodionov
- Manager: Dmitri Alenichev
- Stadium: Otkrytie Arena
- Russian Premier League: 5th
- Russian Cup: Round of 16 vs Kuban Krasnodar
- Top goalscorer: League: Quincy Promes (18); All: Quincy Promes (18)
- Highest home attendance: 41,850 vs CSKA Moscow; 14 August 2015
- Lowest home attendance: 15,051 vs Krasnodar; 22 November 2015
- Average home league attendance: 25,179; 16 May 2016
Home colours	Away colours

The 2015–16 Spartak Moscow season was the 24th successive season that the club played in the Russian Premier League, the highest tier of association football in Russia. Spartak Moscow took part in the Russian Cup and also took part in 2016–17 UEFA Europa League season.

== Season events ==
Following the termination of Murat Yakin's contract as manager on 30 May 2015, with Dmitri Alenichev being appointed as manager on 10 June 2015.

== Squad ==
As of match played 21 May 2016

No.	Name	Nationality	Position	Date of birth (age)	Signed from	Signed in	Contract ends	Apps.	Goals
Goalkeepers
30	Sergei Pesyakov	(Russia)	GK	28 May 1988 (aged 27)	Shinnik Yaroslavl	2009		42	0
31	Fyodor Arsentyev	(Russia)	GK	17 February 1999 (aged 17)	Youth Team	2015		0	0
32	Artyom Rebrov	(Russia)	GK	4 March 1984 (aged 32)	Shinnik Yaroslavl	2011		80	0
47	Mikhail Filippov	(Russia)	GK	10 June 1992 (aged 23)	Znamya Truda Orekhovo-Zuyevo	2014		0	0
56	Vadim Averkiyev	(Russia)	GK	1 June 1997 (aged 18)	Youth Team	2013		0	0
58	Aleksei Kozlov	(Russia)	GK	23 January 1999 (aged 17)	Youth Team	2015		0	0
81	Yuriy Shcherbakov	(Russia)	GK	11 April 1996 (aged 20)	Youth Team	2013		0	0
85	Vladislav Teryoshkin	(Russia)	GK	16 July 1995 (aged 20)	Youth Team	2012		0	0
98	Aleksandr Maksimenko	(Russia)	GK	23 February 1998 (aged 18)	Youth Team	2014		0	0
Defenders
3	Sergei Bryzgalov	(Russia)	DF	15 November 1992 (aged 23)	Saturn Ramenskoye	2011		52	1
4	Sergei Parshivlyuk	(Russia)	DF	18 March 1989 (aged 27)	Youth Team	2007		170	3
7	Kirill Kombarov	(Russia)	DF	22 January 1987 (aged 29)	Dynamo Moscow	2010		95	3
13	Vladimir Granat	(Russia)	DF	22 May 1987 (aged 28)	Youth team	2015		15	0
16	Salvatore Bocchetti	(Italy)	DF	30 November 1986 (aged 29)	Rubin Kazan	2013		57	3
18	Ilya Kutepov	(Russia)	DF	29 July 1993 (aged 22)	Akademiya Tolyatti	2012		12	0
23	Dmitri Kombarov	(Russia)	DF	22 January 1987 (aged 29)	Dynamo Moscow	2010		190	25
26	Anton Khodyrev	(Russia)	DF	26 January 1992 (aged 24)	Youth Team	2009		4	0
34	Yevgeni Makeyev	(Russia)	DF	24 July 1989 (aged 26)	Youth Team	2008		201	4
35	Leonid Mironov	(Russia)	DF	14 September 1998 (aged 17)	Youth team	2015		0	0
38	Konstantin Shcherbakov	(Russia)	DF	20 March 1997 (aged 19)	Youth team	2013		0	0
45	Aleksandr Putsko	(Russia)	DF	24 February 1993 (aged 23)	Youth Team	2010		3	0
46	Artyom Mamin	(Russia)	DF	25 July 1997 (aged 18)	Youth team	2014		0	0
54	Ilya Ivanov	(Russia)	DF	9 January 1999 (aged 17)	Youth team	2015		0	0
55	Nikolai Fadeyev	(Russia)	DF	9 May 1993 (aged 23)	Youth Team	2010		1	0
61	Kirill Feofilaktov	(Russia)	DF	10 April 1998 (aged 18)	Youth team	2015		0	0
62	Aydar Lisinkov	(Russia)	DF	2 January 1994 (aged 22)	Youth team	2012		0	0
64	Denis Kutin	(Russia)	DF	5 October 1993 (aged 22)	Youth Team	2010		3	0
65	Oleg Krasilnichenko	(Russia)	DF	21 January 1997 (aged 19)	Youth team	2014		0	0
68	Daniil Petrunin	(Russia)	DF	10 June 1999 (aged 16)	Youth team	2015		0	0
76	Ivan Kostylev	(Russia)	DF	17 August 1996 (aged 19)	Youth team	2015		0	0
80	Ivan Khomukha	(Russia)	DF	14 July 1994 (aged 21)	Youth Team	2010		0	0
92	Nikolai Rasskazov	(Russia)	DF	4 January 1998 (aged 18)	Youth team	2015		0	0
93	Artyom Sokol	(Russia)	DF	11 June 1997 (aged 18)	Youth team	2014		0	0
94	Andrei Shigorev	(Russia)	DF	25 September 1997 (aged 18)	Youth team	2014		0	0
96	Aleksandr Likhachyov	(Russia)	DF	22 July 1996 (aged 19)	Youth team	2012		0	0
Midfielders
5	Rômulo	(Brazil)	MF	19 September 1990 (aged 25)	Vasco da Gama	2012		60	3
8	Denis Glushakov	(Russia)	MF	27 January 1987 (aged 29)	Lokomotiv Moscow	2013		87	7
10	Quincy Promes	(Netherlands)	MF	4 January 1992 (aged 24)	Twente	2014		61	31
17	Aleksandr Zuyev	(Russia)	MF	26 June 1996 (aged 19)	Youth team	2013		19	0
22	Dmitri Kudryashov	(Russia)	MF	13 May 1983 (aged 33)	Luch-Energiya Vladivostok)	2014		29	5
25	Lorenzo Melgarejo	(Paraguay)	MF	10 August 1990 (aged 25)	Kuban Krasnodar	2016		11	2
27	Aleksandr Zotov	(Russia)	MF	27 August 1990 (aged 25)	Youth Team	2008		38	1
29	Daniil Gorovykh	(Russia)	MF	30 January 1997 (aged 19)	Youth team	2014		0	0
37	Georgi Melkadze	(Russia)	MF	4 April 1997 (aged 19)	Youth team	2014		6	0
40	Artyom Timofeyev	(Russia)	MF	12 January 1994 (aged 22)	Your team	2012		4	0
42	Denis Patsev	(Russia)	MF	11 April 1999 (aged 17)	Youth team	2015		0	0
43	Pyotr Volodkin	(Russia)	MF	4 March 1999 (aged 17)	Youth team	2015		0	0
49	Jano Ananidze	(Georgia (country))	MF	10 October 1992 (aged 23)	Youth Team	2009		102	11
51	Dmitri Kayumov	(Russia)	MF	11 May 1992 (aged 24)	Youth Team	2009		1	0
52	Igor Leontyev	(Russia)	MF	18 March 1994 (aged 22)	Your team	2011		5	0
53	Artyom Samsonov	(Russia)	MF	5 January 1994 (aged 22)	Your team	2011		1	0
57	Kirill Orekhov	(Russia)	MF	27 January 1999 (aged 17)	Youth team	2015		0	0
59	Nazar Gordeochuk	(Russia)	MF	11 April 1997 (aged 19)	Youth team	2014		0	0
60	Konstantin Savichev	(Russia)	MF	6 March 1994 (aged 22)	Your team	2011		0	0
63	Shamsiddin Shanbiyev	(Russia)	MF	18 February 1997 (aged 19)	Youth team	2014		0	0
66	Maxim Yermakov	(Russia)	MF	21 April 1995 (aged 21)	Youth team	2012		0	0
71	Ivelin Popov	(Bulgaria)	MF	26 October 1987 (aged 28)	Kuban Krasnodar	2015		31	6
73	Ayaz Guliyev	(Russia)	MF	27 November 1996 (aged 19)	Youth team	2012		0	0
74	Nikita Kiselyov	(Russia)	MF	15 May 1998 (aged 18)	Youth team	2015		0	0
78	Zelimkhan Bakayev	(Russia)	MF	1 July 1996 (aged 19)	Youth team	2013		2	0
82	Ilya Mazurov	(Russia)	MF	7 June 1999 (aged 16)	Youth team	2015		0	0
83	Vladislav Panteleyev	(Russia)	MF	15 August 1996 (aged 19)	Youth team	2012		0	0
84	Boris Tsygankov	(Russia)	MF	17 April 1998 (aged 18)	Youth team	2015		0	0
87	Soltmurad Bakayev	(Russia)	MF	5 August 1999 (aged 16)	Youth team	2015		0	0
89	Vladlen Babayev	(Russia)	MF	12 October 1996 (aged 19)	Youth team	2012		0	0
91	Aleksandr Lomovitsky	(Russia)	MF	27 January 1998 (aged 18)	Youth team	2015		0	0
95	Vladislav Razdelkin	(Russia)	MF	13 April 1998 (aged 18)	Youth team	2015		0	0
97	Danil Poluboyarinov	(Russia)	MF	4 February 1997 (aged 19)	Youth team	2014		0	0
Forwards
20	Zé Luís	(Cape Verde)	FW	24 January 1991 (aged 25)	Braga	2015		24	10
36	Dmitri Malikov	(Russia)	FW	14 February 1997 (aged 19)	Youth team	2014		0	0
39	Ippei Shinozuka	(Japan)	FW	20 March 1995 (aged 21)	Youth team	2012		0	0
41	Vladimir Obukhov	(Russia)	FW	8 February 1992 (aged 24)	Youth Team	2008		5	0
44	Pavel Yakovlev	(Russia)	FW	7 April 1991 (aged 25)	Youth Team	2008		92	12
67	Artyom Fedchuk	(Russia)	FW	20 December 1994 (aged 21)	Youth team	2011		0	0
70	Aleksandr Kozlov	(Russia)	FW	19 March 1993 (aged 23)	Youth team	2009		28	1
75	Maximiliano Artemio Lyalyushkin	(Russia)	FW	6 February 1997 (aged 19)	Youth team	2014		0	0
79	Aleksandr Rudenko	(Russia)	FW	15 March 1999 (aged 17)	Youth team	2015		0	0
Away on loan
9	Denis Davydov	(Russia)	FW	22 March 1995 (aged 21)	Youth team	2012		31	1
10	Yura Movsisyan	(Armenia)	FW	2 August 1987 (aged 28)	Krasnodar	2012		66	26
35	Serdar Tasci	(Germany)	DF	24 April 1987 (aged 29)	VfB Stuttgart	2013		43	3
	Tino Costa	(Argentina)	MF	9 January 1985 (aged 31)	Valencia	2013		35	3
Players that left Spartak Moscow during the season
1	Anton Mitryushkin	(Russia)	GK	8 February 1996 (aged 20)	Youth Team	2012		4	0
11	Aras Özbiliz	(Armenia)	MF	9 March 1990 (aged 26)	Kuban Krasnodar	2013		40	5
15	Roman Shirokov	(Russia)	MF	6 July 1981 (aged 34)	Zenit St.Petersburg	2014		20	1
19	José Jurado	(Spain)	MF	29 June 1986 (aged 29)	Schalke 04	2013		77	14
31	Ilya Sukhoruchenko	(Russia)	GK	23 February 1998 (aged 18)	Youth Team	2013		0	0
33	Vladimir Zubarev	(Russia)	MF	5 January 1993 (aged 23)	Youth team	2010		0	0
74	Valentin Vinnichenko	(Russia)	DF	21 April 1995 (aged 21)	Youth team	2012		0	0

=== Out on loan ===
Note: Flags indicate national team as defined under FIFA eligibility rules; some limited exceptions apply. Players may hold more than one non-FIFA nationality.

No.	Pos.	Nation	Player
9	FW	RUS	Denis Davydov (at Mladá Boleslav)
10	FW	ARM	Yura Movsisyan (at Real Salt Lake)

No.	Pos.	Nation	Player
35	DF	GER	Serdar Tasci (at Bayern Munich)
—	MF	ARG	Tino Costa (at Fiorentina)

=== Left club during season ===
Note: Flags indicate national team as defined under FIFA eligibility rules; some limited exceptions apply. Players may hold more than one non-FIFA nationality.

No.	Pos.	Nation	Player
1	GK	RUS	Anton Mitryushkin (to Sion)
11	MF	ARM	Aras Özbiliz (to Beşiktaş)
15	MF	RUS	Roman Shirokov (to CSKA Moscow)
19	MF	ESP	José Jurado (to Watford)

No.	Pos.	Nation	Player
31	GK	RUS	Ilya Sukhoruchenko
33	MF	RUS	Vladimir Zubarev (to Ufa)
74	DF	RUS	Valentin Vinnichenko (to Armavir)

== Transfers ==
=== In ===
Date	Position	Nationality	Name	From	Fee	Ref.
3 June 2015	MF	(Bulgaria)	Ivelin Popov	Kuban Krasnodar	Undisclosed	
1 July 2015	DF	(Russia)	Vladimir Granat	Dynamo Moscow	Undisclosed	
5 July 2015	FW	(Cape Verde)	Zé Luís	Braga	Undisclosed	
8 February 2016	MF	(Paraguay)	Lorenzo Melgarejo	Kuban Krasnodar	Undisclosed	

=== Out ===
Date	Position	Nationality	Name	To	Fee	Ref.
15 July 2015	FW	(Paraguay)	Lucas Barrios	Palmeiras	Undisclosed	
22 July 2015	MF	(Spain)	José Jurado	Watford	Undisclosed	
22 July 2015	MF	(Brazil)	Rafael Carioca	Atlético Mineiro	Undisclosed	
31 August 2015	DF	(Russia)	Aleksandr Stepanov	Armavir	Undisclosed	
31 August 2015	FW	(Russia)	Vyacheslav Krotov	Ufa	Undisclosed	
1 September 2015	DF	(Russia)	Pavel Lelyukhin	Dynamo Moscow	Undisclosed	
29 December 2015	MF	(Russia)	Vladimir Zubarev	Ufa	Undisclosed	
23 January 2016	MF	(Armenia)	Aras Özbiliz	Beşiktaş	Undisclosed	
1 February 2016	GK	(Russia)	Anton Mitryushkin	Sion	Undisclosed	

=== Loans out ===
Date from	Position	Nationality	Name	To	Date to	Ref.
12 August 2015	GK	(Russia)	Sergei Pesyakov	Anzhi Makhachkala	8 January 2016	
31 August 2015	GK	(Russia)	Pavel Yakovlev	Krylia Sovetov	31 May 2016	
11 January 2016	MF	(Argentina)	Tino Costa	Fiorentina	30 June 2016	
15 January 2016	FW	(Armenia)	Yura Movsisyan	Real Salt Lake	1 December 2016	
1 February 2016	DF	(Germany)	Serdar Tasci	Bayern Munich	30 June 2016	
15 February 2016	FW	(Russia)	Denis Davydov	Mladá Boleslav	18 May 2016	

=== Released ===
Date	Position	Nationality	Name	Joined	Date
23 July 2015	MF	(Russia)	Diniyar Bilyaletdinov	Rubin Kazan	24 July 2015
31 July 2015	DF	(Argentina)	Juan Insaurralde	Chiapas	
31 December 2016	GK	(Russia)	Ilya Sukhoruchenko	Armavir	
31 December 2016	DF	(Russia)	Valentin Vinnichenko	Armavir	
31 December 2016	FW	(Russia)	Daniil Makeyev	Khimki-M	
23 January 2016	MF	(Russia)	Roman Shirokov	CSKA Moscow	9 February 2016
30 June 2016	GK	(Russia)	Fyodor Arsentyev	Rubin Kazan	
30 June 2016	GK	(Russia)	Yuriy Shcherbakov		
30 June 2016	DF	(Russia)	Nikolai Fadeyev	Khimki	26 August 2016
30 June 2016	DF	(Russia)	Aydar Lisinkov	Vityaz Podolsk	
30 June 2016	MF	(Argentina)	Tino Costa	San Lorenzo	8 July 2016
30 June 2016	MF	(Russia)	Dmitri Kayumov	Tambov	
30 June 2016	MF	(Russia)	Anton Khodyrev	Sokol Saratov	
30 June 2016	MF	(Russia)	Dmitri Kudryashov	Anzhi Makhachkala	
30 June 2016	MF	(Russia)	Maxim Yermakov	Stumbras	
30 June 2016	FW	(Russia)	Maximiliano Artemio Lyalyushkin		

== Competitions ==
=== Russian Premier League ===
==== League table ====
Pos	Team	Pld	W	D	L	GF	GA	GD	Pts	Qualification or relegation
3	Zenit Saint Petersburg	30	17	8	5	61	32	+29	59	Qualification for the Europa League group stage (Note: Zenit Saint Petersburg qualified for the Europa League group stage by winning the 2015–16 Russian Cup.)
4	Krasnodar	30	16	8	6	54	25	+29	56	Qualification for the Europa League third qualifying round
5	Spartak Moscow	30	15	5	10	48	39	+9	50	Qualification for the Europa League third qualifying round
6	Lokomotiv Moscow	30	14	8	8	43	33	+10	50	
7	Terek Grozny	30	11	11	8	35	30	+5	44	

Source: Russian Premier League, Soccerway
Rules for classification: 1) Points; 2) Matches won; 3) Head-to-head points; 4) Head-to-head matches won; 5) Head-to-head goal difference; 6) Head-to-head goals scored; 7) Head-to-head away goals; 8) Goal difference; 9) Goals scored; 10) Away goals scored.

==== Results by round ====
Round	1	2	3	4	5	6	7	8	9	10	11	12	13	14	15	16	17	18	19	20	21	22	23	24	25	26	27	28	29	30
Ground	H	A	H	A	H	A	H	H	A	H	A	H	A	H	A	H	A	H	A	H	A	A	H	A	H	A	H	A	H	A
Result	D	W	W	W	L	W	L	W	L	D	W	L	W	L	L	W	D	W	L	W	W	L	D	L	D	W	W	W	W	L
Position	8	5	4	4	4	4	4	4	4	5	4	5	5	5	6	5	5	4	7	7	5	7	7	7	7	5	5	5	5	5

Updated to match(es) played on 21 May 2016. Source: Russian Premier League
A = Away; H = Home; W = Win; D = Draw; L = Loss

==== Results ====
17 July 2015 1	Spartak Moscow	2 – 2	Ufa	Moscow
19:00 MSK (UTC+3)	Tasci 24'; Zé Luís 79'; Bocchetti (yellow card) 90+2'	Report	Handžić 12'; Paurević (yellow card) 17'; Frimpong (red card) 30'; Yurchenko (yellow card) 64'; Stotsky 67'; Zaseyev (yellow card) 80'	Stadium: Otkritie Arena; Attendance: 23,221; Referee: Vladimir Moskalyov

26 July 2015 2	Krasnodar	0 – 1	Spartak Moscow	Krasnodar
20:00 MSK (UTC+3)	Kaleshin (yellow card) 88'	Report	Movsisyan 12'; Shirokov (yellow card) 90+3'; Rebrov (yellow card) 90+4'	Stadium: Kuban Stadium; Attendance: 24,956; Referee: Mikhail Vilkov

3 August 2015 3	Spartak Moscow	1 – 0	Rubin Kazan	Moscow
19:00 MSK (UTC+3)	Shirokov (yellow card) 40'; Bocchetti (yellow card) 49'; Movsisyan 60'	Report	Cotugno (yellow card) 40'; Georgiev (yellow card) 75'; Kuzmin (yellow card) 80' (yellow-red card) 86'	Stadium: Otkritie Arena; Attendance: 26,163; Referee: Sergey Lapochkin

9 August 2015 4	Krylia Sovetov	0 – 2	Spartak Moscow	Samara
19:00 MSK (UTC+3)		Report	Promes 5', 52'; Popov (yellow card) 51'; Rebrov (yellow card) 69'; Tasci (yellow card) 82'	Stadium: Metallurg Stadium; Attendance: 26,280; Referee: Kirill Levnikov

14 August 2015 5	Spartak Moscow	1 – 2	CSKA Moscow	Moscow
21:30 MSK (UTC+3)	D. Kombarov 36' (pen.); Zé Luís (yellow card) 76'; Boccetti (yellow card) 87'	Report	Ignashevich 31' (yellow card) 48'; Musa 35'; Dzagoev (yellow card) 74'; Akinfeev (yellow card) 90+3'	Stadium: Otkritie Arena; Attendance: 41,850; Referee: Vitali Meshkov

22 August 2015 6	Amkar Perm	1 – 3	Spartak Moscow	Perm
15:00 MSK (UTC+3)	Belorukov (yellow card) 59'; Gol 78'	Report	Movsisyan 20'; Shirokov (yellow card) 32'; Promes 66', 71'	Stadium: Zvezda Stadium; Attendance: 14,800; Referee: Sergey Kulikov

29 August 2015 7	Spartak Moscow	1 – 2	Anzhi Makhachkala	Moscow
19:30 MSK (UTC+3)	Popov (yellow card) 29'; D.Kombarov 53' (pen.)	Report	Almeida (yellow card) 16'; Ebecilio 27' (yellow card) 28'; Mkrtchyan (yellow card) 68'; Zhirov (yellow card) 71' (goal) 85'; Pesyakov (yellow card) 90+3'	Stadium: Otkritie Arena; Attendance: 26,167; Referee: Mikhail Vilkov

13 September 2015 8	Spartak Moscow	1 – 0	Rostov	Moscow
13:30 MSK (UTC+3)	Promes 27'; D.Kombarov (yellow card) 87'; Popov (yellow card) 89'	Report	Yoo (yellow card) 59'; Bastos (yellow card) 70'	Stadium: Otkritie Arena; Attendance: 22,228; Referee: Vladislav Bezborodov

19 September 2015 9	Kuban Krasnodar	3 – 0	Spartak Moscow	Krasnodar
19:00 MSK (UTC+3)	Khubulov 9'; Melgarejo 36'; Ignatyev 86'	Report	Glushakov (yellow card) 56'; K.Kombarov (yellow card) 64'; Özbiliz (yellow card) 71'	Stadium: Kuban Stadium; Attendance: 15,213; Referee: Sergey Lapochkin

26 September 2015 10	Spartak Moscow	2 – 2	Zenit St.Petersburg	Moscow
19:00 MSK (UTC+3)	Zé Luís 6'; Popov 70'	Report	Hulk 27'; Danny (yellow card) 43'; Dzyuba 87'	Stadium: Otkritie Arena; Attendance: 41,214; Referee: Sergey Ivanov

3 October 2015 11	Mordovia Saransk	0 – 1	Spartak Moscow	Saransk
14:30 MSK (UTC+3)	Mukhametshin (yellow card) 72'	Report	Popov 4'; Parshivlyuk (yellow card) 40'; Özbiliz (yellow card) 90+1'	Stadium: Start Stadium; Attendance: 11,575; Referee: Vladimir Moskalyov

18 October 2015 12	Spartak Moscow	1 – 2	Lokomotiv Moscow	Moscow
13:30 MSK (UTC+3)	Glushakov (yellow card) 39'; Özbiliz (yellow card) 70'; Bocchetti 77'; Popov (yellow card) 78'	Report	Kolomeytsev 9' (yellow card) 23'; Niasse 49'; Mykhalyk (yellow card) 78'; Guilherme (yellow card) 81'; Samedov (yellow card) 86'	Stadium: Otkritie Arena; Attendance: 38,651; Referee: Igor Fedotov

25 October 2015 13	Dynamo Moscow	2 – 3	Spartak Moscow	Khimki
13:30 MSK (UTC+3)	Kokorin 17'; Pogrebnyak 67'; Zhirkov (yellow card) 77'; Denisov (yellow card) 87'	Report	Tasci (yellow card) 7'; Promes 22', 90+1'; Parshivlyuk (yellow card) 34'; Bocchetti (yellow card) 52'; Davydov 70'; Glushakov (yellow card) 85'	Stadium: Arena Khimki; Attendance: 13,500; Referee: Vitali Meshkov

1 November 2015 14	Spartak Moscow	0 – 1	Ural Sverdlovsk Oblast	Moscow
19:30 MSK (UTC+3)	Tasci (yellow card) 34'; Granat (yellow card) 40'; Shirokov (yellow card) 61'; Zé Luís (yellow card) 85'	Report	Acevedo (yellow card) 42' (yellow-red card) 82' (goal) 80'; Khozin (yellow card) 72'	Stadium: Otkritie Arena; Attendance: 16,228; Referee: Vladislav Bezborodov

7 November 2015 15	Terek Grozny	2 – 1	Spartak Moscow	Grozny
16:00 MSK (UTC+3)	Adílson 21'; Semenov (yellow card) 38'; Rodolfo (yellow card) 53'; M'bengue 80'	Report	Semenov 6' (o.g.); Parshivlyuk (yellow card) 63'; Tasci (yellow card) 66'	Stadium: Akhmat-Arena; Attendance: 19,700; Referee: Kirill Levnikov

22 November 2015 16	Spartak Moscow	3 – 2	Krasnodar	Moscow
19:30 MSK (UTC+3)	Parshivlyuk (yellow card) 13'; Glushakov 27', 53'; Promes 29' (yellow card) 90+1'	Report	Ari 23'; Smolov (yellow card) 72'; Granqvist 81'; Gazinsky (yellow card) 86'	Stadium: Otkritie Arena; Attendance: 15,051; Referee: Igor Nizovtsev

30 November 2015 17	Rubin Kazan	2 – 2	Spartak Moscow	Kazan
19:15 MSK (UTC+3)	Dević 70' (yellow card) 71'; Ustinov (yellow card) 73'; Nabiullin (yellow card) 77'; Kvirkvelia 90+4' (yellow card) 90+4'	Report	Zé Luís 51'; Promes 74' (pen.)	Stadium: Kazan Arena; Attendance: 20,255; Referee: Sergey Kulikov

4 December 2015 18	Spartak Moscow	1 – 0	Krylia Sovetov	Moscow
19:00 MSK (UTC+3)	Promes 1'; Bocchetti (yellow card) 7'; Parshivlyuk (yellow card) 28'; Kutepov (yellow card) 36'; Rômulo (yellow card) 50'; Movsisyan (yellow card) 78'	Report	Jahović (yellow card) 21'; Simaeys (yellow card) 39'	Stadium: Otkritie Arena; Attendance: 18,017; Referee: Vladimir Moskalyov

6 March 2016 19	CSKA Moscow	1 – 0	Spartak Moscow	Khimki
19:30 MSK (UTC+3)	Musa 11'; Wernbloom (yellow card) 51'	Report	D.Kombarov (yellow card) 39'; Makeyev (yellow card) 53'; Bocchetti (yellow card) 83'	Stadium: Arena Khimki; Attendance: 18,200; Referee: Aleksei Nikolaev

12 March 2016 20	Spartak Moscow	2 – 1	Amkar Perm	Moscow
17:00 MSK (UTC+3)	Zé Luís 82'; Promes 87' (pen.); Granat (yellow card) 90+1'	Report	Komolov 36'; Zaytsev (yellow card) 54'; Dzhikiya (yellow card) 65'; Zanev (yellow card) 84'; Gol (yellow card) 85'	Stadium: Otkritie Arena; Attendance: 20,702; Referee: Alexander Yegorov

18 March 2016 21	Anzhi Makhachkala	0 – 4	Spartak Moscow	Kaspiysk
19:30 MSK (UTC+3)		Report	Zé Luís 4', 85'; Glushakov 31'; Promes 67'	Stadium: Anzhi Arena; Attendance: 8,950; Referee: Kirill Levnikov

2 April 2016 22	Rostov	2 – 0	Spartak Moscow	Rostov-on-Don
19:30 MSK (UTC+3)	Bastos 2'; Noboa 20'; Mogilevets (yellow card) 53'; Bukharov (yellow card) 79'	Report	D. Kombarov (yellow card) 33' (yellow-red card) 80'; Zotov (yellow card) 59'	Stadium: Olimp-2; Attendance: 15,800; Referee: Sergey Lapochkin

10 April 2016 23	Spartak Moscow	2 – 2	Kuban Krasnodar	Moscow
19:30 MSK (UTC+3)	Popov 6'; Promes 51'; Zé Luís (yellow card) 60'	Report	Apodi 36'; Mayrovich 45'; Xandão (yellow card) 50'; Armaș (yellow card) 53'; Yakuba (yellow card) 56'	Stadium: Otkritie Arena; Attendance: 21,222; Referee: Sergey Ivanov

14 April 2016 24	Zenit St.Petersburg	5 – 2	Spartak Moscow	Saint Petersburg
19:30 MSK (UTC+3)	Witsel 15'; Hulk (yellow card) 35' (goal) 46'; Neto (yellow card) 41'; Dzyuba 65'; Maurício 73'; García 87'; Lombaerts (yellow card) 90+3'	Report	Popov 10'; Glushakov 21' (yellow card) 32'; Bocchetti (yellow card) 35'; Makeyev (yellow card) 35' (yellow-red card) 78'; Promes (yellow card) 87'	Stadium: Petrovsky Stadium; Attendance: 18,000; Referee: Mikhail Vilkov

23 April 2016 25	Spartak Moscow	2 – 2	Mordovia Saransk	Moscow
17:00 MSK (UTC+3)	Bocchetti 49' (yellow card) 60'; Promes 58'; Popov (yellow card) 77'; Zuyev (yellow card) 79'	Report	Samodin 42'; Lutsenko 62'; Mahmudov (yellow card) 66'; Mukhametshin (yellow card) 90'	Stadium: Otkritie Arena; Attendance: 17,276; Referee: Vladislav Bezborodov

30 April 2016 26	Lokomotiv Moscow	0 – 2	Spartak Moscow	Moscow
19:30 MSK (UTC+3)	N'Dinga (yellow card) 41'; Pejčinović (yellow card) 87'	Report	Ďurica 43' (o.g.); Popov (yellow card) 48'; Promes (yellow card) 65'; Bryzgalov (yellow card) 68'; Pesyakov (yellow card) 76'; Makeyev (yellow card) 82'; Glushakov (yellow card) 85'; Zé Luís 90+3'	Stadium: Lokomotiv Stadium; Attendance: 20,140; Referee: Igor Fedotov

8 May 2016 27	Spartak Moscow	3 – 0	Dynamo Moscow	Moscow
19:30 MSK (UTC+3)	Promes 44', 86'; Bocchetti (yellow card) 49'; Zé Luís 55'; Glushakov (yellow card) 74'	Report	Yeshchenko (yellow card) 30'	Stadium: Otkritie Arena; Attendance: 26,508; Referee: Sergei Karasev

12 May 2016 28	Ural Sverdlovsk Oblast	0 – 1	Spartak Moscow	Yekaterinburg
17:00 MSK (UTC+3)	Merkulov (yellow card) 9'	Report	Bryzgalov (yellow card) 32'; Promes 40'; Glushakov (yellow card) 70'; Rômulo (yellow card) 75'; Pesyakov (yellow card) 90+1'	Stadium: SKB-Bank Arena; Attendance: 6,495; Referee: Sergey Ivanov

16 May 2016 29	Spartak Moscow	3 – 0	Terek Grozny	Moscow
19:30 MSK (UTC+3)	Bocchetti 33' (yellow card) 85'; Melgarejo (yellow card) 51' (goal) 60'; Promes 63'; Kutin (yellow card) 89'; Glushakov (yellow card) 90+1'	Report	Grozav (yellow card) 45+1'; Rybus (yellow card) 59'; Kuzyayev (yellow card) 73'; Adílson (yellow card) 90+1'	Stadium: Otkritie Arena; Attendance: 23,185; Referee: Alexander Yegorov

21 May 2016 30	Ufa	3 – 1	Spartak Moscow	Ufa
13:30 MSK (UTC+3)	Paurević 1', 68'; Igboun 12' (pen.); Katsalapov (yellow card) 39'; Sysuyev (yellow card) 74'; Bezdenezhnykh (yellow card) 89'; Marcinho (yellow card) 90'	Report	Melgarejo 9'; Bryzgalov (yellow card) 57'	Stadium: Neftyanik Stadium; Attendance: 10,150; Referee: Vitali Meshkov

=== Russian Cup ===
23 September 2015 Round of 32	Volga Nizhny Novgorod	0 – 7	Spartak Moscow	Nizhny Novgorod
18:00 MSK (UTC+3)		Report	Zé Luís 6', 26'; Popov 21', 45'; Bocchetti (yellow card) 38'; Tasci 51'; Zotov 60'; Özbiliz 70'; Bakayev (yellow card) 81'	Stadium: Lokomotiv Stadium; Attendance: 12,500; Referee: Vladimir Seldyakov

29 October 2015 Round of 16	Kuban Krasnodar	1 – 0	Spartak Moscow	Krasnodar
18:00 MSK (UTC+3)	Melgarejo 34'; Khubulov (yellow card) 76'; Belenov (yellow card) 85'; Rabiu (yellow card) 88'	Report	D.Kombarov (yellow card) 55'; Bakayev (yellow card) 79'; Zuyev (yellow card) 84'	Stadium: Kuban Stadium; Attendance: 7,791; Referee: Sergey Ivanov

== Squad statistics ==
As of match played 21 May 2016

=== Appearances and goals ===
No.	Pos	Nat	Player	Total		Premier League		Russian Cup	
No.	Pos	Nat	Player	Apps	Goals	Apps	Goals	Apps	Goals
3	DF	(Russia) RUS	Sergei Bryzgalov	6	0	6	0	0	0
4	DF	(Russia) RUS	Sergei Parshivlyuk	17	0	11+5	0	1	0
5	MF	(Brazil) BRA	Rômulo	22	0	19+3	0	0	0
7	DF	(Russia) RUS	Kirill Kombarov	13	0	9+3	0	1	0
8	MF	(Russia) RUS	Denis Glushakov	29	4	27	4	2	0
10	MF	(Netherlands) NED	Quincy Promes	32	18	29+1	18	2	0
13	DF	(Russia) RUS	Vladimir Granat	15	0	10+4	0	1	0
16	DF	(Italy) ITA	Salvatore Bocchetti	30	3	28	3	2	0
17	MF	(Russia) RUS	Aleksandr Zuyev	16	0	2+12	0	0+2	0
18	DF	(Russia) RUS	Ilya Kutepov	10	0	9+1	0	0	0
20	FW	(Cape Verde) CPV	Zé Luís	24	10	16+7	8	1	2
23	DF	(Russia) RUS	Dmitri Kombarov	26	2	24+1	2	1	0
25	MF	(Paraguay) PAR	Lorenzo Melgarejo	11	2	6+5	2	0	0
27	MF	(Russia) RUS	Aleksandr Zotov	21	1	12+8	0	1	1
30	GK	(Russia) RUS	Sergei Pesyakov	6	0	6	0	0	0
32	GK	(Russia) RUS	Artyom Rebrov	26	0	24	0	2	0
34	DF	(Russia) RUS	Yevgeni Makeyev	17	0	14+2	0	1	0
37	MF	(Russia) RUS	Georgi Melkadze	4	0	0+4	0	0	0
45	DF	(Russia) RUS	Aleksandr Putsko	2	0	2	0	0	0
49	MF	(Georgia (country)) GEO	Jano Ananidze	11	0	6+5	0	0	0
52	MF	(Russia) RUS	Igor Leontyev	5	0	0+3	0	1+1	0
64	DF	(Russia) RUS	Denis Kutin	1	0	0+1	0	0	0
70	FW	(Russia) RUS	Aleksandr Kozlov	1	0	0+1	0	0	0
71	MF	(Bulgaria) BUL	Ivelin Popov	31	6	28+1	4	2	2
78	MF	(Russia) RUS	Zelimkhan Bakayev	2	0	0	0	0+2	0
Players away from the club on loan:
9	FW	(Russia) RUS	Denis Davydov	9	1	1+7	1	1	0
10	FW	(Armenia) ARM	Yura Movsisyan	11	3	10+1	3	0	0
35	DF	(Germany) GER	Serdar Tasci	17	2	16	1	1	1
Players who appeared for Spartak Moscow but left during the season:
11	MF	(Armenia) ARM	Aras Özbiliz	9	1	1+6	0	2	1
15	MF	(Russia) RUS	Roman Shirokov	14	0	14	0	0	0
19	MF	(Spain) ESP	José Jurado	1	0	1	0	0	0

=== Goal scorers ===
Place	Position	Nation	Number	Name	Premier League	Russian Cup	Total
1	MF	(Netherlands)	10	Quincy Promes	18	0	18
2	FW	(Cape Verde)	20	Zé Luís	8	2	10
3	MF	(Bulgaria)	71	Ivelin Popov	4	2	6
4	MF	(Russia)	8	Denis Glushakov	4	0	4
5	FW	(Armenia)	10	Yura Movsisyan	3	0	3
5	DF	(Italy)	16	Salvatore Bocchetti	3	0	3
7	DF	(Russia)	23	Dmitri Kombarov	2	0	2
7	MF	(Paraguay)	25	Lorenzo Melgarejo	2	0	2
7	DF	(Germany)	35	Serdar Tasci	1	1	2
7	Own goal				2	0	2
11	FW	(Russia)	9	Denis Davydov	1	0	1
11	MF	(Russia)	27	Aleksandr Zotov	0	1	1
11	MF	(Armenia)	11	Aras Özbiliz	0	1	1
				TOTALS	48	7	55

=== Clean sheets ===
Place	Position	Nation	Number	Name	Premier League	Russian Cup	Total
1	GK	(Russia)	32	Artyom Rebrov	7	1	8
2	GK	(Russia)	30	Sergei Pesyakov	4	0	4
				TOTALS	11	1	12

=== Disciplinary record ===
Number	Nation	Position	Name	Premier League		Russian Cup		Total	
Number	Nation	Position	Name	Yellow card	Red card	Yellow card	Red card	Yellow card	Red card
3	(Russia)	DF	Sergei Bryzgalov	3	0	0	0	3	0
4	(Russia)	DF	Sergei Parshivlyuk	5	0	0	0	5	0
5	(Brazil)	MF	Rômulo	2	0	0	0	2	0
7	(Russia)	DF	Kirill Kombarov	1	0	0	0	1	0
8	(Russia)	MF	Denis Glushakov	8	0	0	0	8	0
10	(Netherlands)	MF	Quincy Promes	3	0	0	0	3	0
13	(Russia)	DF	Vladimir Granat	2	0	0	0	2	0
16	(Italy)	DF	Salvatore Bocchetti	10	0	1	0	11	0
17	(Russia)	MF	Aleksandr Zuyev	1	0	1	0	2	0
18	(Russia)	DF	Ilya Kutepov	1	0	0	0	1	0
20	(Cape Verde)	FW	Zé Luís	2	0	0	0	2	0
23	(Russia)	DF	Dmitri Kombarov	4	1	1	0	5	1
25	(Paraguay)	MF	Lorenzo Melgarejo	1	0	0	0	1	0
27	(Russia)	MF	Aleksandr Zotov	1	0	0	0	1	0
30	(Russia)	GK	Sergei Pesyakov	2	0	0	0	2	0
32	(Russia)	GK	Artyom Rebrov	2	0	0	0	2	0
34	(Russia)	DF	Yevgeni Makeyev	4	1	0	0	4	1
64	(Russia)	DF	Denis Kutin	1	0	0	0	1	0
71	(Bulgaria)	MF	Ivelin Popov	6	0	0	0	6	0
78	(Russia)	MF	Zelimkhan Bakayev	0	0	2	0	2	0
Players away on loan:
10	(Armenia)	FW	Yura Movsisyan	1	0	0	0	1	0
35	(Germany)	DF	Serdar Tasci	4	0	0	0	4	0
Players who left Spartak Moscow season during the season:
11	(Armenia)	MF	Aras Özbiliz	3	0	0	0	3	0
15	(Russia)	MF	Roman Shirokov	4	0	0	0	4	0
			TOTALS	73	2	5	0	78	2
