= Soslan Gatagov =

Russian footballer

Personal information
- Full name: Soslan Maratovich Gatagov
- Date of birth: 29 September 1992 (age 34)
- Place of birth: Vladikavkaz, Russia
- Height: 1.82 m (6 ft 0 in)
- Position: Defender

Youth career
- 2003–2012: Lokomotiv Moscow

Senior career*
Years	Team	Apps	(Gls)
2010–2012	Lokomotiv Moscow	0	(0)
2012–2014	Spartak Moscow	5	(0)
2015	Ulisses	8	(0)
2016–2017	Torpedo-BelAZ Zhodino	8	(0)
- * Club domestic league appearances and goals

Soslan Maratovich Gatagov (Russian: Сослан Маратович Гатагов, Iron Ossetic: Гæтæгты Мараты фырт Сослан, romanized: Gætæhty Maraty fyrt Soslan; born 29 September 1992) is a former Russian professional football player.

== Club career ==
He made his debut in the Russian Premier League on 8 April 2012 for FC Spartak Moscow in a game against FC Kuban Krasnodar.

== Personal life ==
His older brother Alan Gatagov is also a professional footballer.
