= Roman Kuzovkin =

Russian footballer

Personal information
- Full name: Roman Nikolayevich Kuzovkin
- Date of birth: 19 October 1994 (age 32)
- Place of birth: Lipetsk, Russia
- Height: 1.76 m (5 ft 9 1/2 in)
- Position: Midfielder

Youth career
- Metallurg Lipetsk
- Spartak Moscow

Senior career*
Years	Team	Apps	(Gls)
2012–2013	Spartak Moscow	0	(0)
2013	Volga Nizhny Novgorod	0	(0)
2014	Metallurg Lipetsk	3	(0)
2015	Slavia Mozyr	3	(1)
2016–2017	Dynamo Bryansk	21	(2)
- * Club domestic league appearances and goals as of 28 May 2017

Roman Nikolayevich Kuzovkin (Russian: Роман Николаевич Кузовкин; born 19 October 1994) is a Russian former football midfielder.

== Club career ==
He made his debut in the Russian Professional Football League for FC Metallurg Lipetsk on 15 April 2014 in a game against FC Metallurg Vyksa.
