= Aras Özbiliz =

Armenian footballer

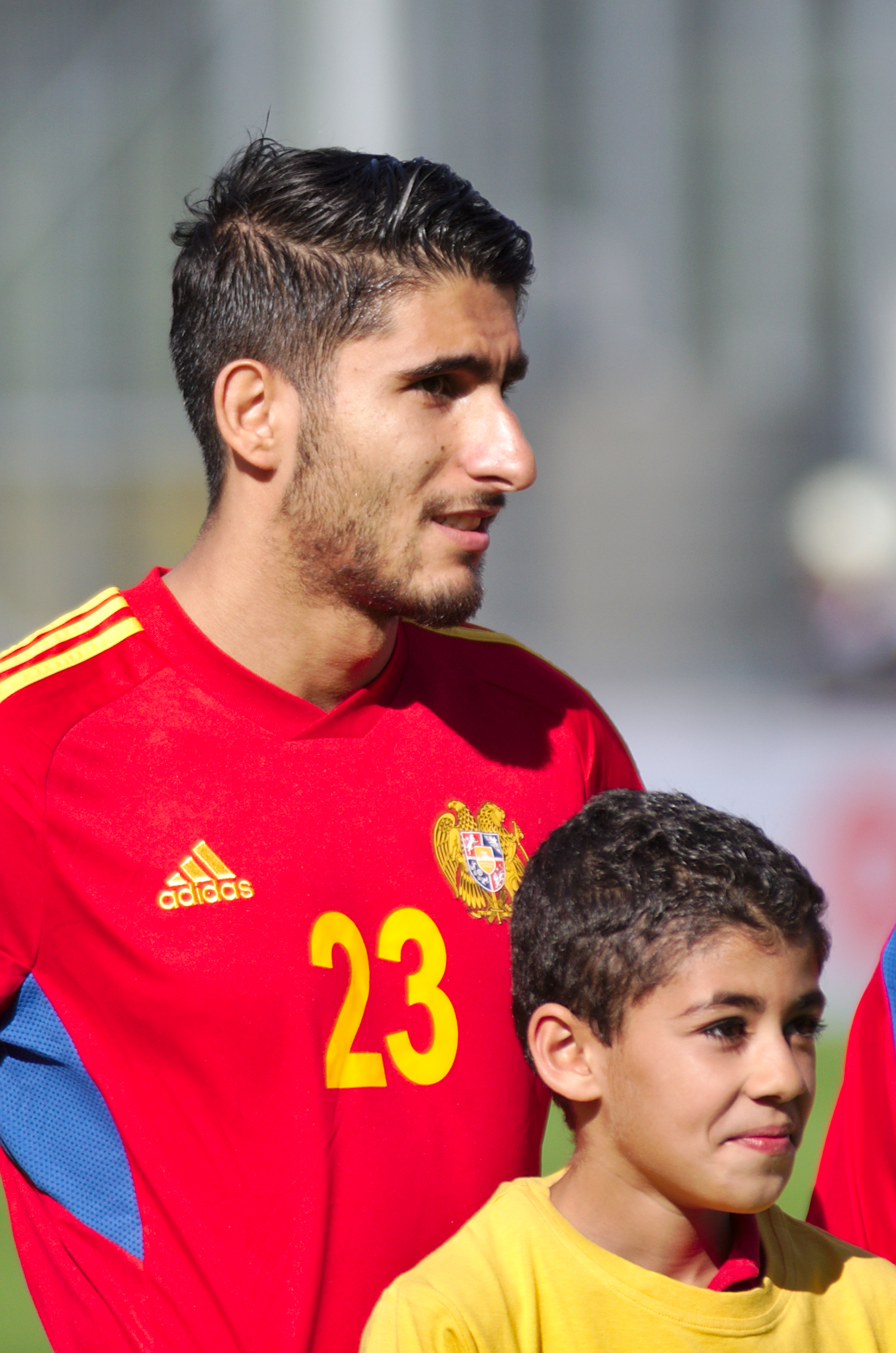
- Özbiliz with Armenia in 2013

Personal information
- Date of birth: 9 March 1990 (age 36)
- Place of birth: Bakırköy, Turkey
- Height: 1.75 m (5 ft 9 in)
- Position: Winger

Youth career
- –1998: Hollandia
- 1998–2010: Ajax

Senior career*
Years	Team	Apps	(Gls)
2010–2012	Ajax	26	(2)
2012–2013	Kuban Krasnodar	24	(11)
2013–2016	Spartak Moscow	35	(3)
2016–2019	Beşiktaş	1	(0)
2016	→ Rayo Vallecano (loan)	3	(0)
2018	→ Sheriff Tiraspol (loan)	4	(0)
2018–2019	→ Willem II (loan)	14	(1)
2019–2022	Pyunik	26	(6)
2023	Urartu	18	(5)

International career
2012–2023	Armenia	41	(6)

Managerial career
- 2024–2025: Urartu (Director of the Football Academy)
- 2025–: Urartu (assistant)
- * Club domestic league appearances and goals

Aras Özbiliz (Armenian: Արաս Օզբիլիզ; born 9 March 1990) is a former professional footballer who played as a winger. Born in Turkey, he represented the Armenia national team.

== Early life ==
Özbiliz was born on 9 March 1990 in the Bakırköy district of Istanbul, Turkey to Armenian parents. He was named after the Aras River, a body of water in Armenia. His ancestors adopted the surname "Özbiliz", literally meaning "one, who preserves his identity." In the early 1990s, his family emigrated from Turkey to the Netherlands. Five years later, he started playing football for the youth team of HVV Hollandia. When he was eight years old, he joined the youth team of Ajax. While playing for the youth team, Özbiliz received two serious injuries, first tearing a cruciate knee ligament, after which he needed an operation, and then a shoulder injury.

== Club career ==
=== Ajax ===
Özbiliz is a product of the Ajax youth academy. Prior to moving to Ajax as a youth, he played for HVV Hollandia in his home town of Hoorn where he grew up. At the age of 8, he participated in tryouts for the Amsterdam side, and was chosen to play for Ajax, having represented Ajax on every stage of the youth academy, before making his debut for the A selection in 2010 under then coach Martin Jol. On 24 July 2007, in a friendly match against Argentinean club Independiente, he managed to score three goals within 7 minutes, which turned out to be a personal record.

In February 2009, Özbiliz agreed a contract for two and a half years with Ajax. In the same year, on 9 June 2009, the attacking midfielder was named Talent van de Toekomst, which is an award signifying the most talented young player in the team to emerge from De Toekomst (Ajax training ground). His performances in the junior team saw him included in the first team for the upcoming 2010–11 season.

In November 2010, Özbiliz twice found himself as a candidate for a match, first in the championship game against PSV Eindhoven, and then in the UEFA Champions League match against the Real Madrid, but he remained on the bench. The anticipated player's Eredivisie debut took place on 28 November 2010 in a game against the guest VVV-Venlo. On the field, the 20-year-old appeared immediately after the break, replacing the Finnish midfielder Teemu Tainio. Özbiliz seriously enhanced the game on the left side of midfield, adding to the first in the rate of. Ajax won with a score of 2–0, and Özbiliz was praised by Martin Jol. Already in the next league match, on 4 December, Özbiliz left in the starting lineup.

A few days before the UEFA Champions League match with the Italian club A.C. Milan, Özbiliz had a flu, and so he could not make his debut in the main European Cup tournament. By this time, the new acting head coach Frank de Boer was appointed, as Martin Jol resigned before the match with Milan. He returned to the field for the next game of Ajax, which took place on 12 December against the Vitesse Arnhem. It is noteworthy that Özbiliz was out on the field instead of the debutant teammate Lorenzo Ebecilio. On 22 December, Frank de Boer announced the list of 18 players registered for the upcoming KNVB Cup match with AZ. Özbiliz was among those players, but he appeared only as a substitute in the 89th minute after the winning goal by Miralem Sulejmani.

In January 2011, Özbiliz and the team set off for Turkey, where they played two friendly matches – against the German club Hamburger SV and the Turkish club Galatasaray. In both matches, Ozbiliz went in on a second-half substitute.

Özbiliz scored his first league goal on 3 April 2011 in the 80th minute in a 3–0 home win against Heracles Almelo. On 14 April, he extended his contract for three more seasons to expire in the summer until 30 June 2014. On 24 February 2012, in a Europa League match against Manchester United, Özbiliz became the first Ajax player to ever score a goal against Manchester United in a European cup match at Old Trafford.

=== Kuban Krasnodar ===
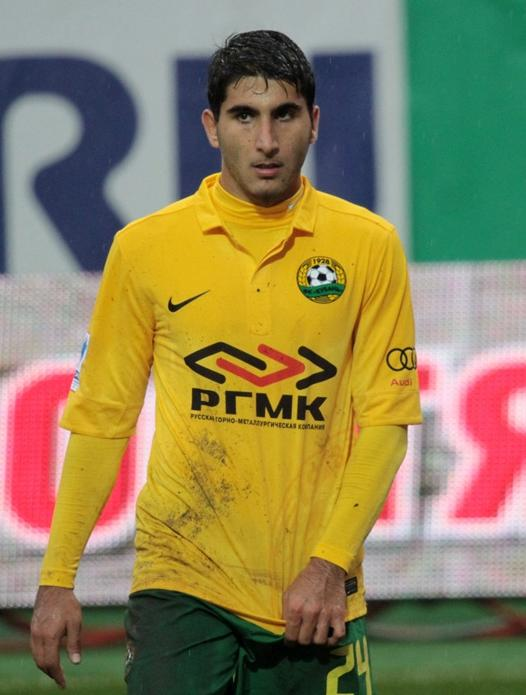
Özbiliz with Kuban Krasnodar in 2012

On 4 May 2012, Kuban Krasnodar announced that they were in talks to acquire Özbiliz. However, only on 8 August this transfer was officially announced. He was transferred for a sum of €1 million. The contract was signed for four years until 2016.

Özbiliz debuted for Kuban on 20 August 2012 in a match against Alania Vladikavkaz. He left in the field for 81 minutes instead of David Tsorayev. On 2 September 2012, he scored his first goal for the Kuban in the 93rd minute in an away game against Dynamo Moscow. In September 2012, in the Russian Premier League, he was scoring twice more in home games: at the 15th of the goal of Spartak Moscow at 63 minutes (final score 2–2) and 29th in the goal of Terek Grozny in 83 minutes, scoring a long-range shot winning the second goal and helping Kuban to a 2–1 victory. On 31 March 2013, Özbiliz scored a swerving, dipping goal from 35 yards away in a match against Spartak Moscow that ended 2–2.

=== Spartak Moscow ===
In July 2013 it was announced that Özbiliz had signed a five-year contract with Spartak Moscow, with Kuban Krasnodar earning €10 million on the transfer fee. On 29 August, he scored his first goal for the club. In May 2014 Özbiliz suffered an anterior cruciate ligament injury, which caused him to have two surgeries. In April 2015 Murat Yakin, then head coach of Spartak, transferred Özbiliz to the reserve team for not being fully fit from the injury, although the player claimed to be 100% fit to play. Later Özbiliz suggested this treatment may be a case of anti-Armenian sentiment by Yakin, ethnic Turk, stating he had learned of being relegated to the reserve team on the centenary of the Armenian genocide.

=== Beşiktaş ===
In January 2016 Özbiliz signed a 4.5-year contract with Beşiktaş and went to Rayo Vallecano on loan.

==== Sheriff Tiraspol (loan) ====
On 7 February 2018, Sheriff Tiraspol announced the signing of Özbiliz on loan from Beşiktaş. After playing just four games for Sheriff Tiraspol, Özbiliz was recalled by Beşiktaş on 12 June 2018.

=== Pyunik ===
On 31 August 2019, Özbiliz signed for Pyunik. On 30 June 2020, Pyunik announced that they had extended Özbiliz's contract for an additional year. On 28 December 2022, Özbiliz left Pyunik.

=== Urartu ===
On 17 January 2023, Özbiliz signed for Urartu.

On 22 November 2023, Özbiliz announced his retirement from football.

== International career ==
In mid-May 2010, Özbiliz was invited by the Football Federation of Armenia to take part in the formation of the youth national team of Armenia. Özbiliz stated that while had never been to Armenia he hoped to gain a spot in the youth team. In the Armenian capital Yerevan, Özbiliz arrived on the evening of 30 May. He immediately started working in Pyunik Yerevan, allowing the head coach of the team Vardan Minasyan to get closely acquainted with him. In training, Özbiliz was also presented with the coach of the Armenian national team, Dane Flemming Serritslev. He noted that the Özbiliz made a good impression, but as of now he could not play for the national team because he had a problem with his documents.

In early February 2011, the Armenian head coach Minasyan said Özbiliz was going to choose between the teams of Armenia and the Netherlands. To persuade the player to play for Armenia, vice-president of the Football Federation of Armenia Ashot Manukyan went to the Netherlands to negotiate with Özbiliz. Manukyan, in turn, said that Özbiliz was in no hurry with his choice of the national team and wanted to gain a foothold in Ajax and then make a final decision, and he was likely to help the Armenian team in the UEFA Euro 2012 qualifying match against Russia. The vice-president of the Football Federation of Armenia stressed that the question of citizenship in Armenia for Özbiliz was no problem and to be resolved by the president of the country's approval.

In late March 2011, the footballer reportedly expressed a desire to play for the Netherlands, as Özbiliz apparently stated he had a chance to progress with the Netherlands and so he chose them. However, these rumors were proven false in early June, when Özbiliz decided to play for Armenia. Özbiliz was quoted as saying, "Netherlands might be a good choice in sporting terms but my heart beats for Armenia. That's why I made this choice." He asked not to be brought for the match with Russia due to the fact that he had little training. In August, Özbiliz was called for a friendly match with Lithuania, which was scheduled for 10 August in Kaunas, but although he was in the starting lineup, he did not get even come off the bench before the match and his participation was in doubt, as the 21-year-old player felt pain in his back. The game ended with the defeat of the Armenian national team 3–0.

In early October 2011, Özbiliz was called to play the match against Armenia and Macedonia, which was held on 7 October. On 4 October 2011, on order of the President Serzh Sargsyan, Özbiliz received Armenian citizenship and became a player of the Armenia national team. Özbiliz was given from the President of the Football Federation of Armenia Ruben Hayrapetyan an Armenia team T-shirt with the number 23.

On 29 February 2012, Özbiliz debuted for the national team of Armenia during a friendly match with Canada and scored a goal in that same match.

== Personal life ==
Özbiliz was raised in Hoorn, Netherlands and holds Armenian citizenship. On 25 April 2021 he lost his Dutch citizenship. He received his Armenian passport on 4 October 2011, as he wanted to represent the Armenia national team, making his debut for Armenia on 29 February 2012 during a friendly match with Canada and scored a goal in that same match.

Özbiliz' sporting idol is Lionel Messi.

== Career statistics ==
=== Club ===
As of match played 8 November 2023

Appearances and goals by club, season and competition
Club	Season	League			National cup		League cup		Continental		Other		Total	
Club	Season	Division	Apps	Goals	Apps	Goals	Apps	Goals	Apps	Goals	Apps	Goals	Apps	Goals
Ajax	2010–11	Eredivisie	14	1	3	0	–		3	0	0	0	20	1
Ajax	2011–12	Eredivisie	12	1	2	0	–		2	1	0	0	16	2
Ajax	2012–13	Eredivisie	0	0	0	0	–		0	0	1	0	1	0
Ajax	Total		26	2	5	0	0	0	5	1	1	0	37	3
Kuban Krasnodar	2012–13	Russian Premier League	22	9	2	0	–		–		–		24	9
Kuban Krasnodar	2013–14	Russian Premier League	2	2	0	0	–		–		–		2	2
Kuban Krasnodar	Total		24	11	2	0	0	0	0	0	0	0	26	11
Spartak Moscow	2013–14	Russian Premier League	27	3	2	0	–		1	0	–		30	3
Spartak Moscow	2014–15	Russian Premier League	1	0	0	0	–		–		–		1	0
Spartak Moscow	2015–16	Russian Premier League	7	0	2	0	–		–		–		9	0
Spartak Moscow	Total		35	3	4	0	0	0	1	0	0	0	40	3
Beşiktaş	2015–16	Süper Lig	0	0	0	0	–		0	0	0	0	0	0
Beşiktaş	2016–17	Süper Lig	1	0	3	0	–		0	0	0	0	4	0
Beşiktaş	2017–18	Süper Lig	0	0	1	1	–		0	0	0	0	1	1
Beşiktaş	2018–19	Süper Lig	0	0	0	0	–		0	0	–		0	0
Beşiktaş	Total		1	0	4	1	0	0	0	0	0	0	5	1
Rayo Vallecano (loan)	2015–16	La Liga	3	0	0	0	–		–		–		3	0
Sheriff Tiraspol (loan)	2018	Divizia Națională	4	0	0	0	–		0	0	0	0	4	0
Willem II (loan)	2018–19	Eredivisie	14	1	3	1	–		–		–		17	2
Pyunik	2019–20	Armenian Premier League	11	5	0	0	–		0	0	–		11	5
Pyunik	2020–21	Armenian Premier League	6	0	1	0	–		–		–		7	0
Pyunik	2021–22	Armenian Premier League	0	0	0	0	–		–		–		0	0
Pyunik	2022–23	Armenian Premier League	9	1	1	0	–		3	1	–		13	2
Pyunik	Total		26	6	2	0	-	-	3	1	-	-	31	7
Urartu	2022–23	Armenian Premier League	7	2	2	2	–		–		–		9	4
Urartu	2023–24	Armenian Premier League	11	3	0	0	–		4	0	1	0	16	3
Urartu	Total		18	5	2	2	-	-	4	0	1	0	25	7
Career total			151	18	22	4	0	0	13	2	2	0	186	34

=== International ===
Appearances and goals by national team and year
National team	Year	Apps	Goals
Armenia	2012	6	2
Armenia	2013	9	2
Armenia	2014	2	0
Armenia	2015	5	0
Armenia	2016	6	0
Armenia	2017	6	2
Armenia	2018	3	0
Armenia	2019	4	0
Total		41	6

Scores and results list Armenia's goal tally first, score column indicates score after each Özbiliz goal.

List of international goals scored by Aras Özbiliz
No.	Date	Venue	Opponent	Score	Result	Competition
1	29 February 2012	Tsirion Stadium, Limassol, Cyprus	Canada	3–1	3–1	Friendly
2	14 November 2012	Republican Stadium, Yerevan, Armenia	Lithuania	4–1	4–2	Friendly
3	11 June 2013	Parken Stadium, Copenhagen, Denmark	Denmark	2–0	4–0	2014 FIFA World Cup qualification
4	11 October 2013	Republican Stadium, Yerevan, Armenia	Bulgaria	1–0	2–1	2014 FIFA World Cup qualification
5	26 March 2017	Republican Stadium, Yerevan, Armenia	Kazakhstan	1–0	2–0	2018 FIFA World Cup qualification
6	9 November 2017	Republican Stadium, Yerevan, Armenia	Belarus	1–0	4–1	Friendly

== Honours ==
Urartu

- Armenian Premier League: 2022–23
- Armenian Cup: 2022–23

Pyunik

- Armenian Premier League: 2021–22

Ajax

- Eredivisie: 2010–11, 2011–12
- KNVB Cup: 2009–10

Beşiktaş

- Süper Lig: 2016–17

Individual

- AFC Ajax Talent of the Future: 2009
