= Igor Leontyev =

Russian footballer

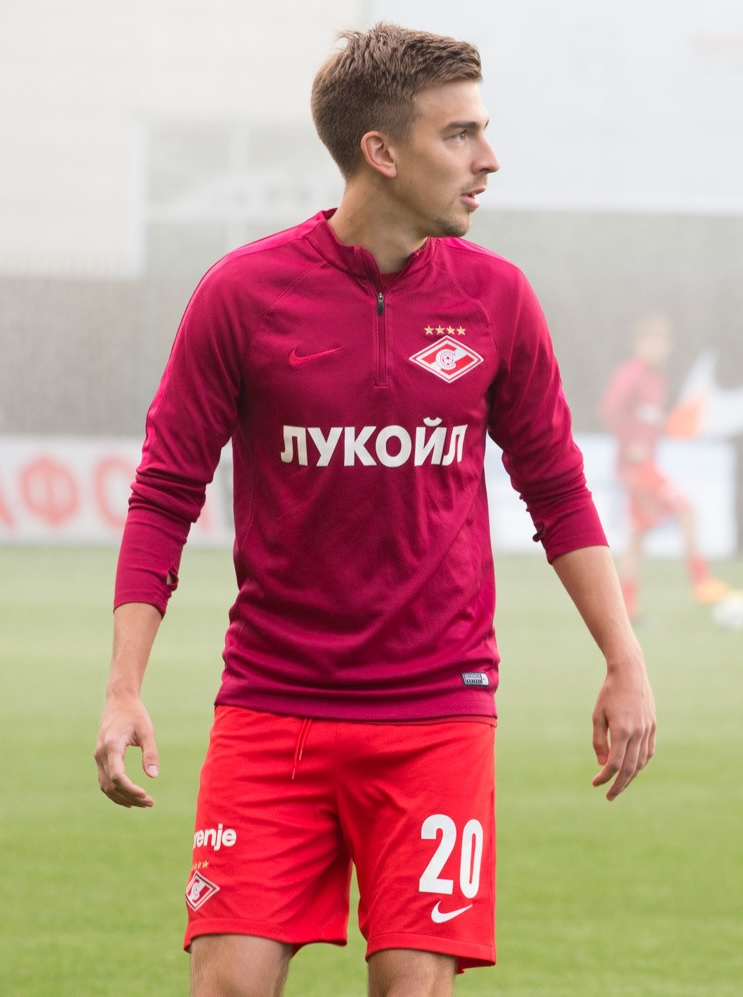
- Leontyev with Spartak Moscow in 2017

Personal information
- Full name: Igor Olegovich Leontyev
- Date of birth: 18 March 1994 (age 32)
- Place of birth: Rostov-on-Don, Russia
- Height: 1.83 m (6 ft 0 in)
- Position: Midfielder

Youth career
- –2016: FC Spartak Moscow

Senior career*
Years	Team	Apps	(Gls)
2013–2018	FC Spartak-2 Moscow	125	(5)
2015–2017	FC Spartak Moscow	4	(0)
2018–2019	FC Tyumen	27	(2)
2019–2021	FC Chayka Peschanokopskoye	51	(2)
2021–2023	FC Shinnik Yaroslavl	59	(1)
2023–2024	FC Sokol Saratov	16	(0)

International career^{‡}
2010–2011	Russia U17	3	(0)
2012	Russia U18	7	(0)
2012–2013	Russia U19	7	(0)
2015	Russia U21	1	(0)
- * Club domestic league appearances and goals as of 25 May 2024 ‡ National team caps and goals as of 14 June 2015

Igor Olegovich Leontyev (Russian: Игорь Олегович Леонтьев; born 18 March 1994) is a Russian football player who plays as an attacking midfielder.

== Club career ==
He made his debut in the Russian Professional Football League for FC Spartak-2 Moscow on 22 July 2013, in a game against FC Tambov.

He made his debut for the main squad of FC Spartak Moscow on 23 September 2015, in a Russian Cup game against FC Volga Nizhny Novgorod.

He made his Russian Premier League debut for FC Spartak Moscow on 25 October 2015, in a game against FC Dynamo Moscow.

=== Career statistics ===
As of 10 December 2017

Club	Season	League			Cup		Continental		Total	
Club	Season	Division	Apps	Goals	Apps	Goals	Apps	Goals	Apps	Goals
FC Spartak Moscow	2011–12	Russian Premier League	0	0	0	0	0	0	0	0
FC Spartak Moscow	2012–13	Russian Premier League	0	0	0	0	0	0	0	0
FC Spartak Moscow	2013–14	Russian Premier League	0	0	0	0	0	0	0	0
FC Spartak Moscow	2014–15	Russian Premier League	0	0	0	0	–		0	0
FC Spartak Moscow	2015–16	Russian Premier League	3	0	2	0	–		5	0
FC Spartak Moscow	2016–17	Russian Premier League	1	0	0	0	0	0	1	0
FC Spartak Moscow	2017–18	Russian Premier League	0	0	0	0	0	0	0	0
FC Spartak Moscow	Total		4	0	2	0	0	0	6	0
FC Spartak-2 Moscow	2013–14	PFL	26	3	–		–		26	3
FC Spartak-2 Moscow	2014–15	PFL	26	1	–		–		26	1
FC Spartak-2 Moscow	2015–16	FNL	31	1	–		–		31	1
FC Spartak-2 Moscow	2016–17	FNL	28	0	–		–		28	0
FC Spartak-2 Moscow	2017–18	FNL	5	0	–		–		5	0
FC Spartak-2 Moscow	Total		116	5	0	0	0	0	116	5
Career total			120	5	2	0	0	0	122	5
