= Ippey Shinozuka =

Russian footballer

Ippey Shinozuka イッペイ・シノヅカ
Personal information
- Date of birth: 20 March 1995 (age 31)
- Place of birth: Abiko, Japan
- Height: 1.76 m (5 ft 9 in)
- Position: Midfielder

Youth career
- 2011–2012: Chertanovo Education Center
- 2012–2013: FC Spartak Moscow

Senior career*
Years	Team	Apps	(Gls)
2013–2017	FC Spartak-2 Moscow	47	(3)
2017–2019	Yokohama F. Marinos	20	(1)
2019–2021	Omiya Ardija	48	(7)
2021–2022	Kashiwa Reysol	14	(1)
2022	→ Albirex Niigata (loan)	14	(2)

International career
2012–2013	Russia U18	2	(0)
Medal record
Yokohama F. Marinos
Runner-up	J.League Cup	2018
Runner-up	Emperor's Cup	2017
- * Club domestic league appearances and goals

Ippey Shinozuka or Ippey Sinodzuka (イッペイ・シノヅカ, Russian: Иппэй Синодзука; born 20 March 1995) is a former professional footballer. Born in Japan, he has represented Russia at youth level.

== Club career ==
He made his debut in the Russian Professional Football League for FC Spartak-2 Moscow on 4 August 2013 in a game against FC Avangard Kursk.

He left Spartak upon the expiration of his contract in June 2017.

After initially planning on returning to Kashiwa Reysol for the 2023 season after spending the 2022 season on loan at Albirex Niigata, in February 2023 it was announced that his contract at Kashiwa would be mutually terminated.

== Personal life ==
Shinozuka was born in Japan, he has represented Russia at youth level. Due to his father is Japanese and his mother is Russian. He moved from Tokyo to Russia at the age of 16. He married Laura Shinozuka in 2016 and has 3 children.

== Career statistics ==
=== Club ===
As of 2019 season.

Appearances and goals by club, season and competition
Club	Season	League			Emperor's Cup		J.League Cup		Total	
Club	Season	Division	Apps	Goals	Apps	Goals	Apps	Goals	Apps	Goals
Yokohama F. Marinos	2017	J1 League	6	1	0	0	0	0	6	1
Yokohama F. Marinos	2018	J1 League	14	0	2	1	10	1	26	2
Yokohama F. Marinos	2019	J1 League	0	0	1	1	6	2	7	3
Omiya Ardija	2019	J2 League	0	0	0	0	0	0	0	0
Career total			20	1	3	2	16	3	39	6
