= Juan Manuel Insaurralde =

Argentine footballer (born 1984)

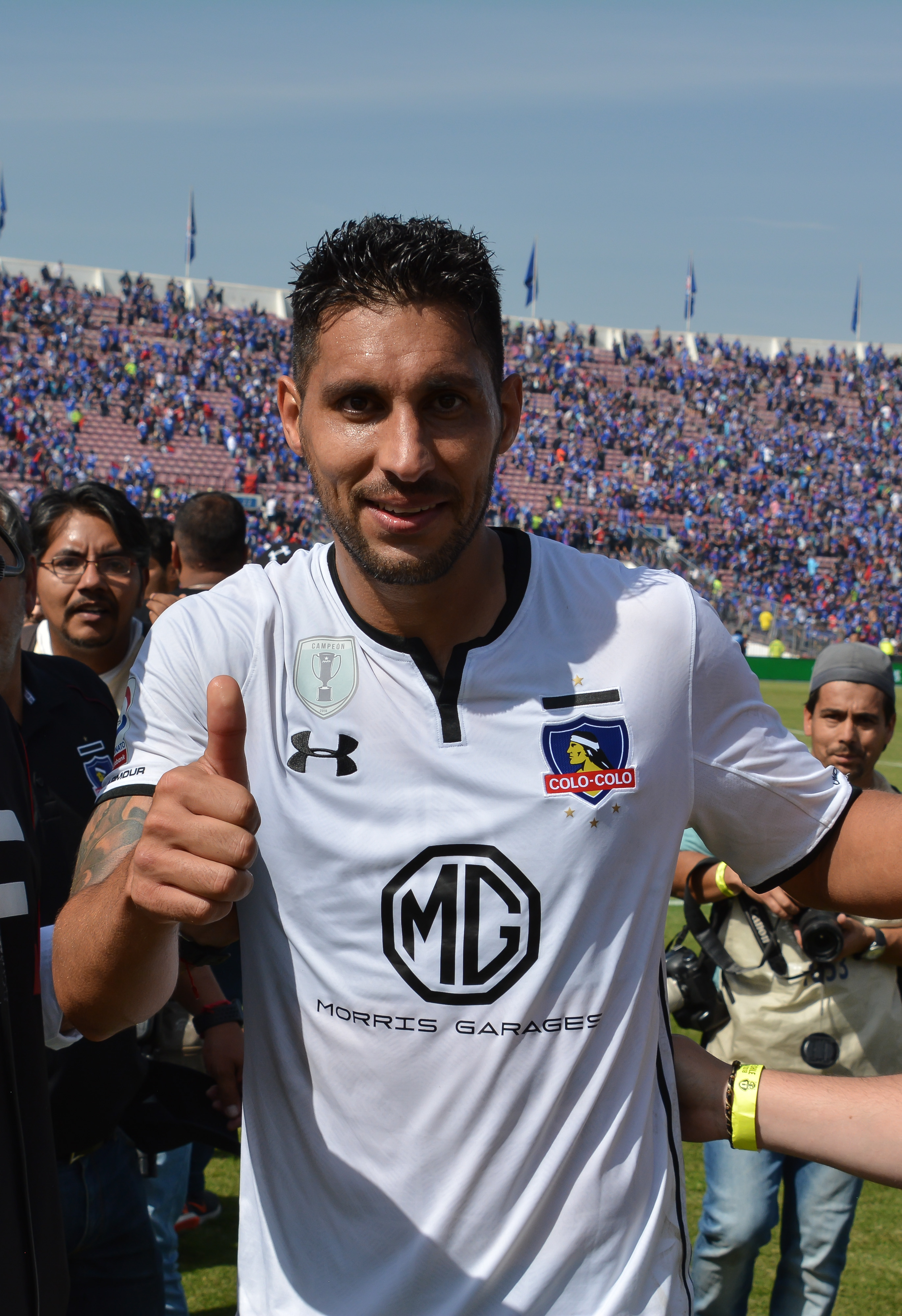
- Insaurralde with Colo-Colo in 2018

Personal information
- Full name: Juan Manuel Insaurralde
- Date of birth: October 3, 1984 (age 42)
- Place of birth: Resistencia, Argentina
- Height: 1.87 m (6 ft 2 in)
- Position: Centre-back

Team information
- Current team: Sarmiento
- Number: 2

Senior career*
| Years | Team | Apps | (Gls) |
| 2003–2008 | Chacarita Juniors | 55 | (7) |
| 2008–2010 | Newell's Old Boys | 67 | (10) |
| 2010–2012 | Boca Juniors | 79 | (6) |
| 2012–2015 | Spartak Moscow | 38 | (2) |
| 2014 | → PAOK (loan) | 11 | (0) |
| 2015–2016 | Chiapas | 14 | (2) |
| 2016–2018 | Boca Juniors | 32 | (2) |
| 2018–2021 | Colo-Colo | 59 | (5) |
| 2021–2023 | Independiente | 69 | (3) |
| 2023– | Sarmiento | 132 | (3) |

International career
| 2010 | Argentina | 2 | (0) |
- * Club domestic league appearances and goals as of 18:02, 10 November 2026 (UTC)

Juan Manuel Insaurralde (born October 3, 1984) is an Argentine professional footballer who plays for Sarmiento as a centre-back.

== Club career ==
Insaurralde made his competitive debut for Chacarita Juniors against Newell's Old Boys, the game was won by Newell's 2–1. After Chacarita were relegated he stayed with the club until 2008, when he was signed by Newell's.

== International career ==
On September 24, 2009, Insaurralde was called up by Argentine national team's coach Diego Maradona for a friendly match against Ghana.

== Honours ==
Boca Juniors

- Copa Argentina: 2011–12
- Primera División (3): 2011 Apertura, 2016–17, 2017–18
