= Valentin Vinnichenko =

Russian footballer (born 1995)

Personal information
- Full name: Valentin Ruslanovich Vinnichenko
- Date of birth: 21 April 1995 (age 31)
- Place of birth: Odintsovo, Russia
- Height: 1.77 m (5 ft 10 in)
- Position: Left back

Youth career
- –2015: FC Spartak Moscow

Senior career*
Years	Team	Apps	(Gls)
2016	FC Armavir	8	(0)
2017	FC Ararat-2 Moscow		
2017–2019	FC Kazanka Moscow	43	(0)
2019–2020	FC SKA Rostov-on-Don	18	(1)
2020–2021	FC Dynamo St. Petersburg (amateur)		
2021	FC Yessentuki	16	(0)
2021–2022	FC Dynamo Vladivostok	29	(0)
- * Club domestic league appearances and goals

Valentin Ruslanovich Vinnichenko (Russian: Валентин Русланович Винниченко; born 21 April 1995) is a Russian former football player.

== Club career ==
He made his debut in the Russian Football National League for FC Torpedo Armavir on 20 March 2016 in a game against FC Gazovik Orenburg.
