= 2011–12 FC Spartak Moscow season =

Spartak Moscow
2011–12 season
- Chairman: Leonid Fedun
- Manager: Valeri Karpin
- Stadium: Luzhniki Stadium
- Russian Premier League: 2nd
- 2010–11 Russian Cup: Semi-final
- 2011–12 Russian Cup: Round of 16
- 2010–11 UEFA Europa League: Quarter-final
- 2011–12 UEFA Europa League: Play-off round
- Top goalscorer: League: Artem Dzyuba (11); All: Artem Dzyuba (12)
Home colours	Away colours	Third colours

The 2011–12 Spartak Moscow season was the 20th straight season that Spartak played in the Russian Premier League, the highest tier of football in Russia.

== Season events ==
On 27 March 2011, Moscow Time was changed from UTC+03:00 with DST, to being permanently set at UTC+04:00.

== Squad ==
As of match played 13 May 2012

No.	Name	Nationality	Position	Date of birth (age)	Signed from	Signed in	Contract ends	Apps.	Goals
Goalkeepers
1	Nikolai Zabolotny	(Russia)	GK	16 April 1990 (aged 22)	Youth Team	2010		7	0
31	Andriy Dykan	(Ukraine)	GK	16 July 1977 (aged 34)	Terek Grozny	2010		61	0
32	Artyom Rebrov	(Russia)	GK	4 March 1984 (aged 28)	Shinnik Yaroslavl	2011		9	0
35	Ivan Komissarov	(Russia)	GK	28 May 1988 (aged 23)	Youth Team	2005		0	0
42	Sergei Chernyshuk	(Russia)	GK	22 February 1992 (aged 20)	Youth Team	2010		0	0
47	Aleksei Skornyakov	(Russia)	GK	16 March 1993 (aged 19)	Znamya Truda	2011		0	0
Defenders
3	Rodri	(Spain)	DF	17 August 1984 (aged 27)	Hércules	2011		28	1
13	Fyodor Kudryashov	(Russia)	DF	5 April 1987 (aged 25)	Sibiryak Bratsk	2005		43	0
15	Sergei Parshivlyuk	(Russia)	DF	18 March 1989 (aged 23)	Youth Team	2007		97	1
17	Marek Suchý	(Czech Republic)	DF	29 March 1988 (aged 24)	Slavia Prague	2010		72	3
19	Marcos Rojo	(Argentina)	DF	20 March 1990 (aged 22)	Estudiantes LP	2011		17	1
21	Nicolás Pareja	(Argentina)	DF	19 January 1984 (aged 28)	Espanyol	2010		44	1
23	Dmitri Kombarov	(Russia)	DF	22 January 1987 (aged 25)	Dynamo Moscow	2010		71	11
24	Kirill Kombarov	(Russia)	DF	22 January 1987 (aged 25)	Dynamo Moscow	2010		49	3
34	Yevgeni Makeyev	(Russia)	DF	24 July 1989 (aged 22)	Youth Team	2008		97	4
37	Sergei Bryzgalov	(Russia)	DF	15 November 1992 (aged 19)	Saturn Ramenskoye	2011		18	0
48	Ivan Khomukha	(Russia)	DF	14 July 1994 (aged 17)	Youth Team	2010		0	0
50	Irakli Chezhiya	(Georgia (country))	DF	22 May 1992 (aged 19)	Youth Team	2008		0	0
55	Nikolai Fadeyev	(Russia)	DF	9 May 1993 (aged 19)	Youth Team	2010		0	0
57	Denis Kutin	(Russia)	DF	5 October 1993 (aged 18)	Youth Team	2010		0	0
58	Aleksandr Putsko	(Russia)	DF	24 February 1993 (aged 19)	Youth Team	2010		0	0
59	Aleksandr Stepanov	(Russia)	DF	10 January 1994 (aged 18)	Youth team	2011		0	0
77	Soslan Gatagov	(Russia)	DF	29 September 1992 (aged 19)	Lokomotiv Moscow	2012		4	0
78	Aydar Lisinkov	(Russia)	DF	2 January 1994 (aged 18)	Youth team	2012		0	0
Midfielders
5	Aleksandr Sheshukov	(Russia)	MF	15 April 1983 (aged 29)	FC Moscow	2010		64	1
6	Rafael Carioca	(Brazil)	MF	18 June 1989 (aged 22)	Grêmio	2009	2013	71	1
8	Aiden McGeady	(Republic of Ireland)	MF	4 April 1986 (aged 26)	Celtic	2010	2014	57	7
12	Jano Ananidze	(Georgia (country))	MF	10 October 1992 (aged 19)	Youth Team	2009		56	7
16	Demy de Zeeuw	(Netherlands)	MF	26 May 1983 (aged 28)	AFC Ajax	2011		16	2
25	Diniyar Bilyaletdinov	(Russia)	MF	27 February 1985 (aged 27)	Everton	2012		8	1
27	Aleksandr Zotov	(Russia)	MF	27 August 1990 (aged 21)	Youth Team	2008		17	0
38	Pavel Sergeyev	(Russia)	MF	20 June 1993 (aged 18)	Youth team	2010		0	0
39	Igor Kireyev	(Russia)	MF	17 February 1992 (aged 20)	Youth Team	2008		1	0
40	Ilnur Alshin	(Russia)	MF	31 August 1993 (aged 18)	Nara-ShBFR Naro-Fominsk	2011		0	0
44	Anton Khodyrev	(Russia)	MF	26 January 1992 (aged 20)	Youth Team	2009		4	0
52	Igor Leontyev	(Russia)	MF	18 March 1994 (aged 18)	Your team	2011		0	0
53	Artyom Samsonov	(Russia)	MF	5 January 1994 (aged 18)	Your team	2011		0	0
54	Roman Kuzovkin	(Russia)	MF	19 October 1994 (aged 17)	Your team	2011		0	0
60	Konstantin Savichev	(Russia)	MF	6 March 1994 (aged 18)	Your team	2011		0	0
61	Vladimir Zubarev	(Russia)	MF	5 January 1993 (aged 19)	Youth team	2010		0	0
63	Alim Dzhukkayev	(Russia)	MF	23 September 1994 (aged 17)	Your team	2011		0	0
65	Anatoliy Zykov	(Russia)	MF	14 February 1994 (aged 18)	Your team	2011		0	0
75	Andrei Svyatov	(Russia)	MF	2 May 1993 (aged 19)	Your team	2012		0	0
80	Artyom Timofeyev	(Russia)	MF	12 January 1994 (aged 18)	Your team	2012		0	0
	Dmitri Kayumov	(Russia)	MF	11 May 1992 (aged 20)	Youth Team	2009		0	0
	Artur Maloyan	(Russia)	MF	4 February 1989 (aged 23)	Youth Team	2007		9	1
Forwards
9	Ari	(Brazil)	FW	1 December 1985 (aged 26)	AZ	2010		73	24
11	Welliton	(Brazil)	FW	22 October 1986 (aged 25)	Goiás	2007		114	60
22	Artem Dzyuba	(Russia)	FW	22 August 1988 (aged 23)	Youth Team	2006		112	24
29	Emmanuel Emenike	(Nigeria)	FW	10 May 1987 (aged 25)	Fenerbahçe	2011		24	13
41	Vladimir Obukhov	(Russia)	FW	8 February 1992 (aged 20)	Youth Team	2008		3	0
43	Artyom Fedchuk	(Russia)	FW	20 December 1994 (aged 17)	Youth team	2011		0	0
46	Dmitri Khlebosolov	(Belarus)	FW	7 October 1990 (aged 21)	Baranovichi	2009		0	0
49	Aleksandr Kozlov	(Russia)	FW	19 March 1993 (aged 19)	Youth team	2009		25	1
62	Temuri Bukiya	(Russia)	FW	2 April 1994 (aged 18)	Saturn Ramenskoye	2011		0	0
Away on loan
4	Emin Mahmudov	(Russia)	MF	27 April 1992 (aged 20)	Saturn Ramenskoye	2011		16	0
14	Pavel Yakovlev	(Russia)	FW	7 April 1991 (aged 21)	Youth Team	2008		41	6
18	Filip Ozobić	(Croatia)	MF	8 April 1991 (aged 21)	Youth Team	2009		4	0
30	Sergei Pesyakov	(Russia)	GK	28 May 1988 (aged 23)	Shinnik Yaroslavl	2009		6	0
31	Konstantin Sovetkin	(Russia)	MF	19 February 1989 (aged 23)	Youth Team	2008		6	0
	Soslan Dzhanayev	(Russia)	GK	13 March 1987 (aged 25)	KAMAZ	2008		41	0
	Igor Gorbatenko	(Russia)	MF	13 February 1989 (aged 23)	Krylia Sovetov-SOK Dimitrovgrad	2008		2	0
Players that left Spartak Moscow during the season
2	Cristian Maidana	(Argentina)	MF	24 January 1987 (aged 25)	Banfield	2008		44	3
7	Ibson	(Brazil)	MF	7 November 1983 (aged 28)	Porto	2009	2012	56	6
10	Alex	(Brazil)	MF	25 March 1982 (aged 30)	Internacional	2009	2013	69	18
20	Artur Valikayev	(Russia)	MF	8 January 1988 (aged 24)	Rostov	2011		3	0
45	Viktor Shchuchkin	(Russia)	DF	1 August 1994 (aged 17)	Youth Team	2011		0	0
51	Pavel Solomatin	(Russia)	MF	4 April 1993 (aged 19)	Youth team	2010		3	0
56	Aleksandr Belenov	(Russia)	GK	13 September 1986 (aged 25)	Salyut Belgorod	2010	2014	1	0
70	Artemi Maleyev	(Russia)	MF	4 May 1991 (aged 21)	Youth Team	2009		0	0
89	Aleksandr Prudnikov	(Russia)	FW	26 February 1989 (aged 23)	Youth Team	2007		42	6
90	Andrey Tikhonov	(Russia)	MF	16 October 1970 (aged 41)	Khimki	2011		263	90
	Egor Filipenko	(Belarus)	DF	10 April 1988 (aged 24)	BATE Borisov	2008		22	1
	Malik Fathi	(Germany)	DF	29 October 1983 (aged 28)	Hertha BSC	2008	2011	46	7

=== On loan ===
Note: Flags indicate national team as defined under FIFA eligibility rules; some limited exceptions apply. Players may hold more than one non-FIFA nationality.

No.	Pos.	Nation	Player
4	MF	RUS	Emin Mahmudov (at Tom Tomsk)
14	FW	RUS	Pavel Yakovlev (at Krylia Sovetov)
18	MF	CRO	Filip Ozobić (at Hajduk Split)
30	GK	RUS	Sergei Pesyakov (at Rostov)

No.	Pos.	Nation	Player
31	MF	RUS	Konstantin Sovetkin (at Volga Ulyanovsk)
—	GK	RUS	Soslan Dzhanayev (at Akhmat Grozny)
—	MF	RUS	Igor Gorbatenko (at Ural Sverdlovsk Oblast)

=== Left club during season ===
Note: Flags indicate national team as defined under FIFA eligibility rules; some limited exceptions apply. Players may hold more than one non-FIFA nationality.

No.	Pos.	Nation	Player
2	MF	ARG	Cristian Maidana (to Rangers de Talca)
7	MF	BRA	Ibson (to Santos)
10	MF	BRA	Alex (to Corinthians)
20	MF	RUS	Artur Valikayev (to Shinnik Yaroslavl)
45	DF	RUS	Viktor Shchuchkin
51	MF	RUS	Pavel Solomatin (to Karelia Petrozavodsk)

No.	Pos.	Nation	Player
56	GK	RUS	Aleksandr Belenov (to Kuban Krasnodar)
70	MF	RUS	Artemi Maleyev (to KAMAZ)
89	FW	RUS	Aleksandr Prudnikov (to Anzhi Makhachkala)
90	MF	RUS	Andrey Tikhonov (Retired)
—	DF	BLR	Egor Filipenko (to BATE Borisov)
—	DF	GER	Malik Fathi (to Mainz 05)

== Transfers ==
=== In ===
Date	Position	Nationality	Name	From	Fee	Ref.
Winter 2011	GK	(Russia)	Aleksei Skornyakov	Znamya Truda	Undisclosed	
Winter 2011	DF	(Russia)	Sergei Bryzgalov	Saturn Ramenskoye	Undisclosed	
Winter 2011	MF	(Russia)	Ilnur Alshin	Nara-ShBFR Naro-Fominsk	Undisclosed	
Winter 2011	MF	(Russia)	Temuri Bukiya	Saturn Ramenskoye	Undisclosed	
Winter 2011	MF	(Russia)	Konstantin Savichev	Saturn Ramenskoye	Undisclosed	
Winter 2011	MF	(Russia)	Artur Valikayev	Rostov	Undisclosed	
3 November 2010	DF	(Argentina)	Marcos Rojo	Estudiantes LP	Undisclosed	
15 January 2011	MF	(Russia)	Emin Mahmudov	Saturn Ramenskoye	Free	
7 March 2011	DF	(Spain)	Rodri	Hércules	Undisclosed	
10 March 2011	MF	(Russia)	Andrey Tikhonov	Khimki	Undisclosed	
6 July 2011	MF	(Netherlands)	Demy de Zeeuw	AFC Ajax	Undisclosed	
28 July 2011	FW	(Nigeria)	Emmanuel Emenike	Fenerbahçe	€10,000,000	
23 August 2011	GK	(Russia)	Artyom Rebrov	Shinnik Yaroslavl	Undisclosed	
14 December 2011	MF	(Russia)	Soslan Gatagov		Free	

=== Out ===
Date	Position	Nationality	Name	To	Fee	Ref.
2 February 2011	MF	(Russia)	Aleksandr Pavlenko	Terek Grozny	Undisclosed	
17 May 2011	MF	(Brazil)	Alex	Corinthians	Undisclosed	
30 June 2011	GK	(Russia)	Aleksandr Belenov	Kuban Krasnodar	Undisclosed	
20 July 2011	MF	(Brazil)	Ibson	Santos	Undisclosed	
13 August 2011	FW	(Russia)	Aleksandr Prudnikov	Anzhi Makhachkala	Undisclosed	
Summer 2011	MF	(Argentina)	Cristian Maidana	Rangers de Talca	Undisclosed	
Winter 2012	MF	(Russia)	Pavel Solomatin	Karelia Petrozavodsk	Undisclosed	
Winter 2012	MF	(Russia)	Artur Valikayev	Shinnik Yaroslavl	Undisclosed	

=== Loans out ===
Date from	Position	Nationality	Name	To	Date to	Ref.
28 August 2010	GK	(Russia)	Soslan Dzhanayev	Terek Grozny	31 December 2012	
Winter 2011	FW	(Belarus)	Dmitri Khlebosolov	Naftan Novopolotsk	Winter 2012	
15 December 2010	MF	(Argentina)	Cristian Maidana	Huracán	Summer 2011	
23 December 2010	GK	(Russia)	Sergei Pesyakov	Tom Tomsk	Winter 2012	
27 December 2010	MF	(Russia)	Artur Maloyan	Dynamo Bryansk	Winter 2011	
11 February 2011	MF	(Russia)	Aleksandr Zotov	Zhemchuzhina-Sochi	Summer 2011	
16 February 2011	DF	(Belarus)	Egor Filipenko	BATE Borisov	Winter 2012	
March 2011	MF	(Russia)	Konstantin Sovetkin	Volga Ulyanovsk	Summer 2012	
March 2011	FW	(Russia)	Aleksandr Prudnikov	Anzhi Makhachkala	13 August 2011	
3 March 2011	MF	(Russia)	Igor Gorbatenko	Dynamo Bryansk	Summer 2011	
14 July 2011	FW	(Russia)	Pavel Yakovlev	Krylia Sovetov	Summer 2012	
29 August 2011	MF	(Russia)	Fyodor Kudryashov	Krasnodar	Winter 2012	
31 August 2011	MF	(Russia)	Artur Valikayev	Amkar Perm	Winter 2012	
Summer 2011	MF	(Croatia)	Filip Ozobić	Hajduk Split	30 June 2012	
Summer 2011	MF	(Russia)	Igor Gorbatenko	Ural Sverdlovsk Oblast	Summer 2012	
10 January 2012	GK	(Russia)	Sergei Pesyakov	Rostov	31 May 2012	
25 February 2012	MF	(Russia)	Emin Makhmudov	Tom Tomsk	Summer 2012	

=== Released ===
Date	Position	Nationality	Name	Joined	Date
Summer 2011	DF	(Germany)	Malik Fathi	Mainz 05	
Summer 2011	MF	(Russia)	Artemi Maleyev	KAMAZ	
31 December 2011	DF	(Belarus)	Egor Filipenko	BATE Borisov	February 2012
31 May 2012	GK	(Russia)	Ivan Komissarov		
31 May 2012	GK	(Russia)	Aleksei Skornyakov	Spartak Shchyolkovo	
31 May 2012	DF	(Georgia (country))	Irakli Chezhiya	Khimik Dzerzhinsk	
31 May 2012	DF	(Russia)	Fyodor Kudryashov	Terek Grozny	
31 May 2012	DF	(Spain)	Rodri	Rayo Vallecano	
31 May 2012	MF	(Russia)	Alim Dzhukkayev		
31 May 2012	MF	(Russia)	Igor Kireyev	Rostov	
31 May 2012	MF	(Russia)	Pavel Sergeyev	Arsenal Tula	
31 May 2012	MF	(Russia)	Aleksandr Sheshukov	Rostov	
31 May 2012	FW	(Russia)	Temuri Bukiya	Dynamo České Budějovice	

== Friendlies ==
=== 2012 Copa del Sol ===
Pos	Team	Pld	W	PKW	PKL	L	GF	GA	GD	Pts
1	(Russia) Spartak Moscow	3	1	1	1	0	6	3	+3	6
2	(Norway) Molde	3	2	0	0	1	4	5	−1	6
3	(Slovenia) Olimpija	3	1	1	0	1	7	3	+4	5
4	(Sweden) Göteborg	3	1	0	2	0	4	3	+1	5
5	(Norway) Rosenborg	3	1	1	0	1	4	3	+1	5
6	(China) Dalian Aerbin	3	0	0	0	3	2	10	−8	0

28 January 2012	Göteborg (Sweden)	2 – 2 (2 – 4 p)	(Russia) Spartak Moscow	Benidorm, Spain
21:00 MSK (UTC+4)	Hysén 36'; Haglund 65'		Welliton 39'; Emenike 69'	Stadium: Estadio Municipal Guillermo Amor; Attendance: 300; Referee: Espen Berntsen (Norway)
	Penalties
	Hysén (penalty missed); Sobralense (penalty scored); Allansson (penalty scored); Valgarðsson (penalty missed)		(penalty missed) Parshivlyuk; (penalty scored) McGeady; (penalty scored) Ananidze; (penalty scored) Rojo; (penalty scored) Ari

1 February 2012	Spartak Moscow (Russia)	1 – 1 (8 – 9 p)	(Norway) Rosenborg	Benidorm, Spain
21:00 MSK (UTC+4)	Emenike 66'		Chibuike 90'	Stadium: Estadio Municipal Guillermo Amor; Attendance: 700; Referee: Martin Hansson (Sweden)
	Penalties
	de Zeeuw (penalty scored); Carioca (penalty scored); K.Kombarov (penalty scored); Rodri (penalty scored); Bilyaletdinov (penalty scored); Pareja (penalty scored); Bryzgalov (penalty scored); Welliton (penalty scored); Kudryashov (penalty missed)		(penalty scored) Prica; (penalty scored) Dočkal; (penalty scored) Chibuike; (penalty scored) Selnæs; (penalty scored) Høiland; (penalty scored) Larsen; (penalty scored) Svensson; (penalty scored) Dorsin; (penalty scored) Henriksen

4 February 2012	Spartak Moscow (Russia)	3 – 0	(Norway) Molde	Benidorm, Spain
18:00 MSK (UTC+4)	Dzyuba 18'; Welliton 41', 46'			Stadium: Estadio Municipal Guillermo Amor; Attendance: 200; Referee: Mattias Gestranius (Finland)

==== Final ====
7 February 2012	Spartak Moscow (Russia)	1 – 0	(Denmark) Copenhagen	Cartagena, Spain
21:00 MSK (UTC+4)	Pareja 33'			Stadium: Estadio Cartagonova

== Competitions ==
=== 2010–11 UEFA Europa League ===
==== Knockout phase ====
17 February 2011 Round of 32 1st leg	Basel (Switzerland)	2 – 3	(Russia) Spartak Moscow	Basel, Switzerland
22:05 MSK (UTC+3)	Stocker (yellow card) 34'; Frei 36'; Streller 41'; Yapi (yellow card) 48'; Shaqiri (red card) 78'; Kusunga (yellow card) 90'	Report	McGeady (yellow card) 34'; Carioca (yellow card) 52'; D.Kombarov 61'; Dzyuba 70'; Alex (yellow card) 70'; Dykan (yellow card) 82'; Suchý (yellow card) 90'; Ananidze 90+2'	Stadium: St. Jakob-Park; Attendance: 13,073; Referee: Aleksandar Stavrev (Macedonia)
Note: MSK time changed from (UTC+3) to (UTC+4) on 27 March 2011 .

24 February 2011 Round of 32 2nd leg	Spartak Moscow (Russia)	1 – 1 (4 – 3 agg.)	(Switzerland) Basel	Moscow, Russia
21:00 MSK (UTC+3)	McGeady 90+1'	Report	Chipperfield 15'; Cabral (yellow card) 31'; Zoua (yellow card) 74'; Safari (yellow card) 86'	Stadium: Luzhniki Stadium; Attendance: 14,977; Referee: Cristian Balaj (Romania)
Note: MSK time changed from (UTC+3) to (UTC+4) on 27 March 2011 .

10 March 2011 Round of 16 1st leg	Ajax (Netherlands)	0 – 1	(Russia) Spartak Moscow	Amsterdam, Netherlands
22:05 MSK (UTC+3)	Vertonghen (yellow card) 52'; Eriksen (yellow card) 78'	Report	Suchý (yellow card) 38'; Alex 57'; Welliton (yellow card) 70'; Rojo (yellow card) 77'	Stadium: Amsterdam Arena; Attendance: 32,841; Referee: Manuel Gräfe (Germany)
Note: MSK time changed from (UTC+3) to (UTC+4) on 27 March 2011 .

17 March 2011 Round of 16 2nd leg	Spartak Moscow (Russia)	3 – 0 (4 – 0 agg.)	(Netherlands) Ajax	Moscow, Russia
21:00 MSK (UTC+3)	D.Kombarov 21'; Welliton 30'; Alex 54'; Rojo (yellow card) 78'	Report	Enoh (yellow card) 77'	Stadium: Luzhniki Stadium; Attendance: 33,631; Referee: Martin Atkinson (England)
Note: MSK time changed from (UTC+3) to (UTC+4) on 27 March 2011 .

7 April 2011 Quarterfinal 1st leg	Porto (Portugal)	5 – 1	(Russia) Spartak Moscow	Porto, Portugal
23:05 MSK (UTC+4)	Falcao 37', 84', 90+2'; Moutinho (yellow card) 52'; Varela 65'; D.Kombarov 70' (o.g.)	Report	K.Kombarov (yellow card) 16' (goal) 71'; Rojo (yellow card) 35'; Ibson (yellow card) 60'; Makeyev (yellow card) 81'; Suchý (yellow card) 88'	Stadium: Estádio do Dragão; Attendance: 38,209; Referee: Serge Gumienny (Belgium)

14 April 2011 Quarterfinal 2nd leg	Spartak Moscow (Russia)	2 – 5 (3 – 10 agg.)	(Portugal) Porto	Moscow, Russia
21:00 MSK (UTC+4)	Dzyuba (yellow card) 25' (goal) 52'; Ari 72'	Report	Hulk 28'; C.Rodríguez 45+2'; Guarín 47'; Falcao 54'; Micael 89'	Stadium: Luzhniki Stadium; Attendance: 17,088; Referee: Viktor Kassai (Hungary)

=== Premier League ===
==== Regular season ====
===== Results by round =====
Round	1	2	3	4	5	6	7	8	9	10	11	12	13	14	15	16	17	18	19	20	21	22	23	24	25	26	27	28	29	30
Ground	A	H	A	H	A	H	A	H	A	H	A	H	A	A	H	H	A	H	A	H	A	H	A	H	A	H	A	H	H	A
Result	L	W	L	D	L	W	W	L	W	W	L	D	D	W	L	W	W	D	W	W	D	D	W	W	W	D	L	W	W	D

Updated to match(es) played on 5 November 2011. Source: See Results
A = Away; H = Home; W = Win; D = Draw; L = Loss

===== Results =====
14 March 2011 1	Rostov	4 – 0	Spartak Moscow	Rostov-on-Don
19:30 MSK (UTC+3)	Adamov 6', 48'; Blatnjak 73'; Kalachev 80'	Report	Rodri (yellow card) 45'; Mahmudov (yellow card) 61'	Stadium: Olimp – 2 Attendance: 15,000; Referee: Vladislav Bezborodov
Note: MSK time changed from (UTC+3) to (UTC+4) on 27 March 2011 .

21 March 2011 2	Spartak Moscow	1 – 0	Volga Nizhny Novgorod	Moscow
20:45 MSK (UTC+4)	K.Kombarov (yellow card) 17'; Welliton 50' (yellow card) 80'; Rojo (yellow card) 90'	Report	Getigezhev (yellow card) 27'; Grigalava (yellow card) 80'	Stadium: Luzhniki Stadium; Attendance: 10,000; Referee: Vladimir Pettay
Note: MSK time changed from (UTC+3) to (UTC+4) on 27 March 2011 .

2 April 2011 3	Kuban Krasnodar	3 – 1	Spartak Moscow	Krasnodar
20:45 MSK (UTC+4)	Kulik (yellow card) 10' (goal) 58'; Armaș (yellow card) 29'; Zhavnerchik (yellow card) 33'; Traoré 45' (pen.); Tsorayev (yellow card) 52'; Varga (yellow card) 77'; Davydov 88'	Report	Alex (yellow card) 42'; Sheshukov (yellow card) 45'; Ibson 49' (yellow card) 90+4'; Carioca (yellow card) 90+1'	Stadium: Kuban Stadium; Attendance: 26,000; Referee: Igor Egorov

10 April 2011 4	Spartak Moscow	0 – 0	Terek Grozny	Moscow
20:45 MSK (UTC+4)	Suchý (yellow card) 24'; Welliton (yellow card) 73'	Report	Tiuí (yellow card) 27'; Ferreira (yellow card) 81'	Stadium: Luzhniki Stadium; Attendance: 7,500; Referee: Mikhail Vilkov

17 April 2011 5	Anzhi Makhachkala	2 – 1	Spartak Moscow	Makhachkala
19:30 MSK (UTC+4)	Holenda 29'; Angbwa 75'; Boussoufa (yellow card) 88'; Gadzhiyev (yellow card) 90+'; Bakayev (yellow card) 90+'	Report	D.Kombarov 7'; Sheshukov (yellow card) 74'; Rojo (yellow card) 88'	Stadium: Dynamo Stadium; Attendance: 14,800; Referee: Vladimir Pettay

24 April 2011 6	Spartak Moscow	1 – 0	Spartak Nalchik	Moscow
19:00 MSK (UTC+4)	Suchý (yellow card) 15'; McGeady (yellow card) 24'; Dzyuba 50'	Report	Berkhamov (yellow card) 11'; Leandro (yellow card) 44'; Bagayev (yellow card) 60'; Džudović (yellow card) 85' (yellow-red card) 90+'; Kontsedalov (yellow card) 88'	Stadium: Luzhniki Stadium; Attendance: 9,200; Referee: Vitali Meshkov

30 April 2011 7	CSKA Moscow	0 – 1	Spartak Moscow	Moscow
14:00 MSK (UTC+4)	Nababkin (yellow card) 37'	Report	Suchý (yellow card) 22'; Ari 78'	Stadium: Luzhniki Stadium; Attendance: 51,000; Referee: Yuri Baskakov

8 May 2011 8	Spartak Moscow	1 – 2	Amkar Perm	Moscow
16:15 MSK (UTC+4)	Carioca (yellow card) 9'; McGeady 75'	Report	Sekretov (yellow card) 8'; Mijailović (yellow card) 21'; Mikhalyov 82'; Novaković (yellow card) 84'; Burmistrov 90'	Stadium: Luzhniki Stadium; Attendance: 9,263; Referee: Aleksandr Egorov

15 May 2011 9	Krylia Sovetov	0 – 1	Spartak Moscow	Samara
18:15 MSK (UTC+4)	Sosnin (yellow card) 38'; Ponomarenko (yellow card) 47'; Đorđević (yellow card) 70'	Report	Yakovlev 72'; Kudryashov (yellow card) 75'; Sheshukov (yellow card) 77'	Stadium: Metallurg Stadium; Attendance: 23,702; Referee: Sergey Lapochkin

21 May 2011 10	Spartak Moscow	4 – 0	Krasnodar	Moscow
18:30 MSK (UTC+4)	Ari 30', 90+2'; Dzyuba 51', 65'	Report	Vranješ (yellow card) 53'	Stadium: Luzhniki Stadium; Attendance: 9,231; Referee: Vladimir Pettay

29 May 2011 11	Zenit St.Petersburg	3 – 0	Spartak Moscow	Saint Petersburg
16:00 MSK (UTC+4)	Kerzhakov (yellow card) 11' (goal) 67', 88'; Hubočan (yellow card) 26'; Lazović 37' (pen.); Fayzulin (yellow card) 81'; Alves (yellow card) 84'	Report	Kudryashov (yellow card) 36'; Suchý (yellow card) 41'	Stadium: Petrovsky Stadium; Attendance: 21,400; Referee: Igor Egorov

9 June 2011 12	Spartak Moscow	0 – 0	Rubin Kazan	Moscow
21:00 MSK (UTC+4)	Dzyuba (yellow card) 4'; Mahmudov (yellow card) 85'	Report		Stadium: Luzhniki Stadium; Attendance: 13,050; Referee: Vladislav Bezborodov

14 June 2011 13	Tom Tomsk	1 – 1	Spartak Moscow	Tomsk
15:30 MSK (UTC+4)	Kanunnikov 90+1'	Report	Dzyuba 20'; Parshivlyuk (yellow card) 29'; Yakovlev (yellow card) 38'; Carioca (yellow card) 51'; D.Kombarov (yellow card) 67'; Rodri (yellow card) 83'	Stadium: Trud Stadium; Attendance: 11,000; Referee: Igor Egorov

18 June 2011 14	Lokomotiv Moscow	0 – 2	Spartak Moscow	Moscow
21:00 MSK (UTC+4)	Ozdoyev (yellow card) 34'; Shishkin (yellow card) 39'; Guilherme (red card) 58'	Report	Parshivlyuk (yellow card) 11'; Ananidze 44'; Rodri 45+2'; Dykan (yellow card) 66'	Stadium: Lokomotiv Stadium; Attendance: 26,077; Referee: Maksim Layushkin

22 June 2011 15	Spartak Moscow	0 – 2	Dynamo Moscow	Moscow
18:45 MSK (UTC+4)	Mahmudov (yellow card) 44'; Yakovlev (yellow card) 57'; Welliton (yellow card) 63'	Report	Semshov 34'; Granat (yellow card) 45'; Voronin 65'	Stadium: Luzhniki Stadium; Attendance: 20,752; Referee: Sergei Karasev

26 June 2011 16	Spartak Moscow	3 – 2	Rostov	Moscow
21:00 MSK (UTC+4)	Welliton 54'; Kulesha 57' (o.g.); Rodri (yellow card) 73'; D.Kombarov 81'; Ananidze (yellow card) 85'	Report	Khagush (yellow card) 44'; Gațcan (yellow card) 52' (goal) 67'; Adamov 63'; Malyaka (yellow card) 79'; Vasilyev (yellow card) 90+'	Stadium: Luzhniki Stadium; Attendance: 8,582; Referee: Sergey Lapochkin

24 July 2011 17	Volga Nizhny Novgorod	0 – 2	Spartak Moscow	Nizhny Novgorod
16:30 MSK (UTC+4)	Vatsadze (yellow card) 46'	Report	D.Kombarov 27'; Welliton 67'; Makeyev (yellow card) 90+'	Stadium: Lokomotiv Stadium; Attendance: 17,500; Referee: Vladimir Kazmenko

30 July 2011 18	Spartak Moscow	1 – 1	Kuban Krasnodar	Moscow
20:00 MSK (UTC+4)	Welliton 52'; Rodri (yellow card) 71'; Suchý (yellow card) 82'	Report	Traoré 37' (pen.); Bucur (yellow card) 74'; Tlisov (yellow card) 80'	Stadium: Luzhniki Stadium; Attendance: 10,793; Referee: Vitali Meshkov

7 August 2011 19	Terek Grozny	2 – 4	Spartak Moscow	Grozny
19:15 MSK (UTC+4)	Asildarov 20' (penalty missed) 35'; Maurício 35'; Gvazava (yellow card) 41'; Pavlenko (yellow card) 42'; Georgiev (yellow card) 44'; Dzhanayev (red card) 47'	Report	D.Kombarov (yellow card) 18'; Rojo (yellow card) 34'; Dzyuba (penalty missed) 43' 90+5'; K.Kombarov 51' (pen.); Ari 76'; Suchý (yellow card) 90+6'; Welliton 90+9'	Stadium: Akhmat-Arena; Attendance: 18,000; Referee: Vladislav Bezborodov

14 August 2011 20	Spartak Moscow	3 – 0	Anzhi Makhachkala	Moscow
19:15 MSK (UTC+4)	Ari 35' (yellow card) 42'; D.Kombarov 44'; Kozlov 72'; Carioca (yellow card) 83'; Welliton (yellow card) 84'	Report	Tagirbekov (yellow card) 11'	Stadium: Luzhniki Stadium; Attendance: 23,291; Referee: Mikhail Vilkov

21 August 2011 21	Spartak Nalchik	1 – 1	Spartak Moscow	Nalchik
18:45 MSK (UTC+4)	Goshokov 16'; Gridnev (yellow card) 67'	Report	Parshivlyuk (yellow card) 46'; Dzyuba 53'; Emenike (yellow card) 82'	Stadium: Spartak Stadium; Attendance: 10,000; Referee: Vladimir Kazmenko

28 August 2011 22	Spartak Moscow	2 – 2	CSKA Moscow	Moscow
19:00 MSK (UTC+4)	Parshivlyuk (yellow card) 16'; Welliton (yellow card) 30' (goal) 45+3' de Zeeuw (yellow card) 33'; Pareja (yellow card) 47'; Emenike 75'; D.Kombarov (yellow card) 84'	Report	V.Berezutski (yellow card) 43'; Doumbia 51'; Tošić 69'	Stadium: Luzhniki Stadium; Attendance: 58,572; Referee: Sergei Karasev

11 September 2011 23	Amkar Perm	0 – 1	Spartak Moscow	Perm
13:45 MSK (UTC+4)	Blažić (yellow card) 16'	Report	Pareja 85'; Rodri (yellow card) 90'; D.Kombarov (yellow card) 90+4'	Stadium: Zvezda Stadium; Attendance: 13,250; Referee: Stanislav Sukhina

18 September 2011 24	Spartak Moscow	3 – 0	Krylia Sovetov	Moscow
18:30 MSK (UTC+4)	de Zeeuw 3'; McGeady 28'; Sheshukov (yellow card) 63'; K.Kombarov (yellow card) 79'; Emenike 80'	Report		Stadium: Luzhniki Stadium; Attendance: 31,466; Referee: Sergey Lapochkin

25 September 2011 25	Krasnodar	2 – 4	Spartak Moscow	Krasnodar
14:00 MSK (UTC+4)	Shipitsin 37', 49'; Anđelković (yellow card) 45'	Report	McGeady (yellow card) 22'; Emenike 31'; Dzyuba 36' de Zeeuw 42'; D.Kombarov 73' (pen.); Carioca (yellow card) 83'	Stadium: Kuban Stadium; Attendance: 15,000; Referee: Aleksandr Egorov

2 October 2011 26	Spartak Moscow	2 – 2	Zenit St.Petersburg	Moscow
16:15 MSK (UTC+4)	Anyukov 22' (o.g.); Pareja (yellow card) 32' (yellow-red card) 43'; Welliton (yellow card) 68' (goal) 80'	Report	Danny 39'; Kerzhakov 47'; Hubočan (yellow card) 68'; Lombaerts (yellow card) 71'	Stadium: Luzhniki Stadium; Attendance: 37,075; Referee: Vladimir Kazmenko

15 October 2011 27	Rubin Kazan	3 – 0	Spartak Moscow	Kazan
17:00 MSK (UTC+4)	Natcho (yellow card) 44' (goal) 90+3'; Sharonov (yellow card) 44'; Noboa 54'; Ryazantsev 58'; Kasaev (yellow card) 76'	Report	Emenike (yellow card) 45+' (yellow-red card) 60'	Stadium: Central Stadium; Attendance: 23,650; Referee: Vladislav Bezborodov

22 October 2011 28	Spartak Moscow	4 – 0	Tom Tomsk	Moscow
17:15 MSK (UTC+4)	Suchý 10'; Rojo (yellow card) 29'; Carioca (yellow card) 41'; Ari 44', 89'; Suchý (yellow card) 55'; Kayumov 84'	Report	Boyarintsev (yellow card) 29'; Nakhushev (yellow card) 34'; Sosnovski (yellow card) 43'	Stadium: Luzhniki Stadium; Attendance: 8,650; Referee: Stanislav Sukhina

27 October 2011 29	Spartak Moscow	3 – 0	Lokomotiv Moscow	Moscow
19:30 MSK (UTC+4)	Emenike 2', 15', 51'; Pareja (yellow card) 19'; Parshivlyuk (yellow card) 34'; Carioca (yellow card) 69'; D.Kombarov (yellow card) 90+2'	Report	Glushakov (yellow card) 28'; Zapater (yellow card) 42'; Torbinski (yellow card) 69'; Obinna (yellow card) 81' (yellow-red card) 82'	Stadium: Luzhniki Stadium; Attendance: 40,000; Referee: Aleksei Eskov

5 November 2011 30	Dynamo Moscow	1 – 1	Spartak Moscow	Moscow
18:30 MSK (UTC+4)	Lomić (yellow card) 36'; Kurányi 39' (yellow card) 41'	Report	Carioca (yellow card) 32' (yellow-red card) 64'; McGeady (yellow card) 38' (goal) 57'	Stadium: Arena Khimki; Attendance: 18,636; Referee: Aleksei Nikolaev

===== League table =====
Pos	Team	Pld	W	D	L	GF	GA	GD	Pts	Qualification
2	CSKA Moscow	30	16	11	3	58	29	+29	59	Qualification to Championship group
3	Dynamo Moscow	30	16	7	7	51	30	+21	55	Qualification to Championship group
4	Spartak Moscow	30	15	8	7	48	33	+15	53 (Note: Spartak Moscow ahead of Lokomotiv Moscow on head-to-head points; Lokomotiv Moscow–Spartak Moscow 0–2, Spartak Moscow–Lokomotiv Moscow 3–0.)	Qualification to Championship group
5	Lokomotiv Moscow	30	15	8	7	49	30	+19	53	Qualification to Championship group
6	Kuban Krasnodar	30	14	7	9	38	27	+11	49	Qualification to Championship group

Source: Russian Premier League
Rules for classification: 1) points; 2) number of wins; 3) head-to-head points; 4) number of head-to-head wins; 5) head-to-head goal difference; 6) number of head-to-head goals scored; 7) number of head-to-head away goals scored; 8) goal difference; 9) number of goals scored; 10) number of away goals scored.

==== Championship group ====
===== Results by round =====
Round	1	2	3	4	5	6	7	8	9	10	11	12	13	14
Ground	H	A	H	A	H	A	H	H	A	H	A	H	A	A
Result	W	D	D	D	L	W	L	W	W	L	L	D	W	W

Updated to match(es) played on 13 May 2012. Source: See Results
A = Away; H = Home; W = Win; D = Draw; L = Loss

===== Results =====
20 November 2011 31	Spartak Moscow	2 – 0	Lokomotiv Moscow	Moscow
16:15 MSK (UTC+4)	Emenike 26', 44'; McGeady (yellow card) 32'; Suchý (yellow card) 54'; K.Kombarov (yellow card) 65'; D. Kombarov (yellow card) 82'	Report	Glushakov (yellow card) 34'	Stadium: Luzhniki Stadium; Attendance: 19,244; Referee: Maksim Layushkin

26 November 2011 32	Kuban Krasnodar	1 – 1	Spartak Moscow	Krasnodar
17:00 MSK (UTC+4)	Traoré (yellow card) 22' (goal) 37'; Tlisov (yellow card) 26'; Zelão (yellow card) 88'	Report	Pareja (yellow card) 22'; Rodri (yellow card) 33'; Bryzgalov (yellow card) 78'; Welliton (yellow card) 85'; Makeyev 86'; Carioca (yellow card) 89'	Stadium: Kuban Stadium; Attendance: 16,360; Referee: Aleksandr Egorov

5 March 2012 33	Rubin Kazan	1 – 1	Spartak Moscow	Kazan
19:45 MSK (UTC+4)	Sharonov 58' (yellow card) 59'; Navas (yellow card) 84'; Karadeniz (yellow card) 90'; Kuzmin (yellow card) 90+'	Report	Rodri (yellow card) 60'; Emenike 80'	Stadium: Central Stadium; Attendance: 16,150; Referee: Mikhail Vilkov

12 March 2012 34	Anzhi Makhachkala	0 – 0	Spartak Moscow	Makhachkala
19:00 MSK (UTC+4)	Samba (yellow card) 33'; Jucilei (yellow card) 54'; Holenda (yellow card) 90+'	Report	Suchý (yellow card) 32'; Rodri (yellow card) 86'	Stadium: Dynamo Stadium; Attendance: 15,200; Referee: Sergey Lapochkin

19 March 2012 35	Spartak Moscow	1 – 2	CSKA Moscow	Moscow
19:30 MSK (UTC+4)	Dzyuba 51' (yellow card) 90+'; Pareja (yellow card) 61'; Carioca (yellow card) 89'	Report	Tošić 37'; Wernbloom (yellow card) 55'; Doumbia 62'	Stadium: Luzhniki Stadium; Attendance: 51,255; Referee: Vladislav Bezborodov

25 March 2012 36	Dynamo Moscow	1 – 3	Spartak Moscow	Moscow
15:00 MSK (UTC+4)	Samedov 45'	Report	K.Kombarov (yellow card) 13'; Emenike 30' de Zeeuw (yellow card) 44'; Noboa 70' (o.g.); Dzyuba (yellow card) 85'; Suchý (yellow card) 88'; Ari 90+1'	Stadium: Arena Khimki; Attendance: 15,487; Referee: Sergei Karasev

31 March 2012 37	Spartak Moscow	1 – 2	Zenit St.Petersburg	Moscow
18:00 MSK (UTC+4)	Dzyuba (yellow card) 38' (goal) 85' de Zeeuw (yellow card) 42'; Pareja (yellow card) 62'; Bryzgalov (yellow card) 69'	Report	Semak 10'; Kerzhakov 63' (pen.)	Stadium: Luzhniki Stadium; Attendance: 33,494; Referee: Maksim Layushkin

8 April 2012 38	Spartak Moscow	2 – 0	Kuban Krasnodar	Moscow
18:45 MSK (UTC+4)	Emenike 7'; Ari 60'; Makeyev (yellow card) 81'	Report	Tlisov (yellow card) 65'	Stadium: Luzhniki Stadium; Attendance: 12,817; Referee: Aleksei Eskov

15 April 2012 39	Spartak Moscow	2 – 0	Rubin Kazan	Moscow
16:15 MSK (UTC+4)	Suchý (yellow card) 9'; Bryzgalov (yellow card) 50'; Ari 60'; Emenike 82'	Report	Valdez (yellow card) 27'; Navas (yellow card) 52'; Bocchetti (yellow card) 53' Karadeniz (yellow card) 87'	Stadium: Luzhniki Stadium; Attendance: 12,817

22 April 2012 40	Spartak Moscow	0 – 3	Anzhi Makhachkala	Moscow
16:30 MSK (UTC+4)	Carioca (yellow card) 43'; D.Kombarov (yellow card) 54'	Report	Mukhammad (yellow card) 35'; Eto'o 39'; Lakhiyalov 59'; Agalarov (yellow card) 61'; Pareja 70' (o.g.)	Stadium: Luzhniki Stadium; Attendance: 22,212; Referee: Vladislav Bezborodov

28 April 2012 41	CSKA Moscow	2 – 1	Spartak Moscow	Moscow
19:00 MSK (UTC+4)	Honda (yellow card) 22'; Tošić 23', 57'; Necid (yellow card) 90'	Report	D.Kombarov (yellow card) 13' (yellow-red card) 81'; Dzyuba 44'; Bryzgalov (yellow card) 66'; McGeady (yellow card) 71'; Suchý (yellow card) 86'; Emenike (yellow card) 88'	Stadium: Luzhniki Stadium; Attendance: 50,000; Referee: Aleksei Nikolaev

2 May 2012 42	Spartak Moscow	1 – 1	Dynamo Moscow	Moscow
18:30 MSK (UTC+4)	Zotov (yellow card) 41'; Ari 48'; Rodri (yellow card) 83'	Report	Kurányi 3'; Granat (yellow card) 80'	Stadium: Luzhniki Stadium; Attendance: 14,640; Referee: Aleksei Eskov

6 May 2012 43	Zenit St.Petersburg	2 – 3	Spartak Moscow	Saint Petersburg
16:00 MSK (UTC+4)	Kerzhakov 23'; Criscito (yellow card) 29'; Arshavin (yellow card) 48'; Semak 82' (pen.); Kerzhakov (yellow card) 83'; Shirokov (yellow card) 90+'	Report	K.Kombarov (yellow card) 21'; McGeady (yellow card) 37'; Emenike (yellow card) 37' (red card) 84' (goal) 84'; Bilyaletdinov 70'; D.Kombarov (yellow card) 81'; Rebrov (yellow card) 83'; Carioca 89' (yellow card) 89'	Stadium: Petrovsky Stadium; Attendance: 21,150; Referee: Vladimir Kazmenko

13 May 2012 44	Lokomotiv Moscow	0 – 2	Spartak Moscow	Moscow
18:30 MSK (UTC+4)	Ignatyev (yellow card) 58'; Torbinski (yellow card) 66'	Report	Suchý 23'; Dzyuba 40'; Carioca (yellow card) 51'; McGeady (yellow card) 78'; Rojo (yellow card) 83'; K.Kombarov (yellow card) 85'	Stadium: Lokomotiv Stadium; Attendance: 26,244; Referee: Sergei Karasev

===== League table =====
Pos	Team	Pld	W	D	L	GF	GA	GD	Pts	Qualification
1	Zenit St. Petersburg (C)	44	24	16	4	85	40	+45	88	Qualification to Champions League group stage
2	Spartak Moscow	44	21	12	11	69	47	+22	75	Qualification to Champions League play-off round
3	CSKA Moscow	44	19	16	9	72	47	+25	73	Qualification to Europa League play-off round
4	Dynamo Moscow	44	20	12	12	66	50	+16	72	Qualification to Europa League third qualifying round
5	Anzhi Makhachkala	44	19	13	12	54	42	+12	70	Qualification to Europa League second qualifying round
6	Rubin Kazan	44	17	17	10	55	41	+14	68	Qualification to Europa League group stage (Note: Rubin have won the 2011–12 Russian Cup and thus have qualified for the group stage of the 2012–13 UEFA Europa League.)
7	Lokomotiv Moscow	44	18	12	14	59	48	+11	66	
8	Kuban Krasnodar	44	15	16	13	50	45	+5	61	

Source: Russian Premier League
Rules for classification: 1) points; 2) number of wins; 3) head-to-head points; 4) number of head-to-head wins; 5) head-to-head goal difference; 6) number of head-to-head goals scored; 7) number of head-to-head away goals scored; 8) goal difference; 9) number of goals scored; 10) number of away goals scored
(C) Champions

=== Russian Cup ===
==== 2010–11 ====
3 March 2011 Round of 16	Sibir Novosibirsk	0 – 2	Spartak Moscow	Novosibirsk
16:00 MSK (UTC+3)	Šumulikoski (yellow card) 72'; Astafyev (yellow card) 75'; Valentić (yellow card) 80'	Report	Dzyuba 11' (yellow card) 72'; D.Kombarov (yellow card) 37' (yellow-red card) 75'; Rojo (yellow card) 47'; Yakovlev 49' (yellow card) 55'	Stadium: Spartak Stadium; Attendance: 6,000; Referee: Vladimir Kazmenko
Note: MSK time changed from (UTC+3) to (UTC+4) on 27 March 2011 .

20 April 2011 Quarterfinal	Spartak Moscow	2 – 1	Krasnodar	Moscow
19:30 MSK (UTC+4)	Carioca (yellow card) 32'; Makeyev (yellow card) 45+1'; Welliton 58' (pen.); Ari (yellow card) 66'; Sheshukov (yellow card) 68' (yellow-red card) 84'; Rojo 69'	Report	Markov (yellow card) 82'; Gogniyev 84'; Tubić (penalty missed) 90'	Stadium: Luzhniki Stadium; Attendance: 15,911; Referee: Igor Egorov

11 May 2011 Semifinal	Spartak Moscow	3 – 3 (a.e.t.) (4 – 5 p)	CSKA Moscow	Moscow
19:30 MSK (UTC+4)	Mahmudov (yellow card) 36'; D.Kombarov 45'; Ibson (yellow card) 45' (goal) 76'; McGeady (yellow card) 60'; Ari 61'; Suchý (yellow card) 109'	Report	Doumbia (yellow card) 9' (goal) 72'; Necid 42'; Honda (yellow card) 70'; Vágner Love 82'; Ignashevich (yellow card) 89'	Stadium: Luzhniki Stadium; Attendance: 46,000; Referee: Igor Egorov
	Penalties
	Mahmudov (penalty scored); McGeady (penalty scored); D.Kombarov (penalty missed); Ari (penalty scored); Dzyuba (penalty scored)		(penalty scored) Necid; (penalty scored) Vágner Love; (penalty scored) Honda; (penalty scored) V.Berezutski; (penalty scored) Ignashevich

==== 2011–12 ====
17 July 2011 Round of 32	Istra	0 – 1	Spartak Moscow	Moscow
16:00 MSK (UTC+4)	K.Talantsev (yellow card) 24'; G.Yevstegneyev (yellow card) 88'	Report	Rodri (yellow card) 31'; Welliton 45+'; Carioca (yellow card) 84'	Stadium: Eduard Streltsov Stadium; Attendance: 8,000; Referee: Aleksandr Gonchar

21 September 2011 Round of 16	Spartak Moscow	1 – 1 (a.e.t.) (5 – 6 p)	Volga Nizhny Novgorod	Moscow
20:45 MSK (UTC+4)	McGeady 4'; Rojo (yellow card) 58' (yellow-red card) 75'; Pareja (yellow card) 73'; Parshivlyuk (yellow card) 93' de Zeeuw (yellow card) 107'	Report	Belozyorov (yellow card) 17'; Javadov (yellow card) 69'; Bibilov 86'; Bondar (yellow card) 94'; Grigalava (yellow card) 107'; Pashtov (yellow card) 108'	Stadium: Luzhniki Stadium; Attendance: 5,102; Referee: Sergei Kuznetsov
	Penalties
	D.Kombarov (penalty scored); Pareja (penalty missed) de Zeeuw (penalty scored); Sheshukov (penalty scored); Rodri (penalty scored); Carioca (penalty scored); Welliton (penalty missed)		Crosas (penalty scored); Javadov (penalty scored); Bibilov (penalty scored); Grigalava (penalty missed); Buyvolov (penalty scored); Pashtov (penalty scored); Bondar (penalty scored)

=== 2011–12 UEFA Europa League ===
==== Play-off round ====
18 August 2011 1st leg	Legia Warsaw (Poland)	2 – 2	(Russia) Spartak Moscow	Warsaw, Poland
20:00 MSK (UTC+4)	Radović 3', 69' (yellow card) 87'; Komorowski (yellow card) 33'; Manú (yellow card) 48'; Ljuboja (yellow card) 90'	Report	Carioca (yellow card) 25'; D.Kombarov (yellow card) 40'; Ari 52', 71'	Stadium: Pepsi Arena; Attendance: 23,450; Referee: Mike Dean (England)

25 August 2011 2nd Leg	Spartak Moscow (Russia)	2 – 3 (4 – 5 agg.)	(Poland) Legia Warsaw	Moscow, Russia
19:00 MSK (UTC+4)	K.Kombarov 10'; D.Kombarov 27' (pen.)	Report	Kucharczyk 29'; Rybus 43'; Żyro (yellow card) 85'; Gol 90+2'	Stadium: Luzhniki Stadium; Attendance: 19,345; Referee: Alon Yefet (Israel)

== Squad statistics ==
As of match played 13 May 2012

=== Appearances and goals ===
No.	Pos	Nat	Player	Total		Premier League		2010-11 Russian Cup		2011-12 Russian Cup		2010-11 UEFA Europa League		2011-12 UEFA Europa League	
No.	Pos	Nat	Player	Apps	Goals	Apps	Goals	Apps	Goals	Apps	Goals	Apps	Goals	Apps	Goals
1	GK	(Russia) RUS	Nikolai Zabolotny	7	0	5+1	0	1	0	0	0	0	0	0	0
3	DF	(Spain) ESP	Rodri	28	1	20+3	1	0+1	0	1+1	0	0	0	2	0
5	MF	(Russia) RUS	Aleksandr Sheshukov	30	0	14+6	0	2	0	2	0	4+1	0	1	0
6	MF	(Brazil) BRA	Rafael Carioca	46	1	30+5	1	2	0	1+1	0	5	0	2	0
8	MF	(Republic of Ireland) IRL	Aiden McGeady	40	5	25+6	3	2	0	1	1	6	1	0	0
9	FW	(Brazil) BRA	Ari	45	15	27+11	11	1+2	1	0	0	0+2	1	1+1	2
11	FW	(Brazil) BRA	Welliton	29	10	17+4	7	1	1	2	1	3+1	1	1	0
12	MF	(Georgia (country)) GEO	Jano Ananidze	21	2	7+8	1	0+1	0	2	0	1+1	1	0+1	0
13	DF	(Russia) RUS	Fyodor Kudryashov	15	0	7+4	0	2+1	0	0	0	0	0	0+1	0
15	DF	(Russia) RUS	Sergei Parshivlyuk	21	0	15+4	0	0	0	1	0	0	0	1	0
16	MF	(Netherlands) NED	Demy de Zeeuw	16	2	13	2	0	0	1	0	0	0	1+1	0
17	DF	(Czech Republic) CZE	Marek Suchý	40	2	30+2	2	2	0	1	0	5	0	0	0
19	DF	(Argentina) ARG	Marcos Rojo	17	1	8	0	2	1	1	0	5	0	1	0
21	DF	(Argentina) ARG	Nicolás Pareja	28	1	23+1	1	1	0	1	0	0	0	2	0
22	FW	(Russia) RUS	Artem Dzyuba	52	14	37+4	11	2	1	1	0	4+2	2	2	0
23	DF	(Russia) RUS	Dmitri Kombarov	51	10	38+2	6	2	1	2	0	5+1	2	1	1
24	DF	(Russia) RUS	Kirill Kombarov	48	3	31+6	1	2	0	1	0	6	1	2	1
25	MF	(Russia) RUS	Diniyar Bilyaletdinov	8	1	5+3	1	0	0	0	0	0	0	0	0
27	MF	(Russia) RUS	Aleksandr Zotov	8	0	3+4	0	0	0	0	0	0	0	0+1	0
29	FW	(Nigeria) NGA	Emmanuel Emenike	24	13	20+2	13	0	0	0	0	0	0	2	0
31	GK	(Ukraine) UKR	Andriy Dykan	43	0	32	0	2	0	1	0	6	0	2	0
32	GK	(Russia) RUS	Artyom Rebrov	9	0	7+1	0	0	0	1	0	0	0	0	0
34	DF	(Russia) RUS	Yevgeni Makeyev	46	1	32+3	1	2	0	2	0	6	0	1	0
37	DF	(Russia) RUS	Sergei Bryzgalov	18	0	10+8	0	0	0	0	0	0	0	0	0
41	FW	(Russia) RUS	Vladimir Obukhov	3	0	0+3	0	0	0	0	0	0	0	0	0
49	FW	(Russia) RUS	Aleksandr Kozlov	10	1	0+8	1	0	0	0+1	0	0	0	0+1	0
77	DF	(Russia) RUS	Soslan Gatagov	4	0	0+4	0	0	0	0	0	0	0	0	0
Players away from the club on loan:
4	MF	(Russia) RUS	Emin Mahmudov	16	0	9+3	0	1+1	0	0+2	0	0	0	0	0
14	FW	(Russia) RUS	Pavel Yakovlev	17	2	5+5	1	1+1	1	0	0	1+4	0	0	0
18	MF	(Croatia) CRO	Filip Ozobić	2	0	1	0	0+1	0	0	0	0	0	0	0
Players who appeared for Spartak Moscow but left during the season:
7	MF	(Brazil) BRA	Ibson	17	2	7+3	1	2+1	1	0	0	3+1	0	0	0
10	MF	(Brazil) BRA	Alex	11	2	3	0	2	0	0	0	6	2	0	0
20	MF	(Russia) RUS	Artur Valikayev	3	0	2+1	0	0	0	0	0	0	0	0	0
51	MF	(Russia) RUS	Pavel Solomatin	3	0	0+3	0	0	0	0	0	0	0	0	0
90	MF	(Russia) RUS	Andrey Tikhonov	2	0	1	0	1	0	0	0	0	0	0	0

=== Goal scorers ===
Place	Position	Nation	Number	Name	Premier League	2010-11 Russian Cup	2011-12 Russian Cup	2010-11 UEFA Europa League	2011-12 UEFA Europa League	Total
1	FW	(Brazil)	9	Ari	11	1	0	1	2	15
2	FW	(Russia)	22	Artem Dzyuba	11	1	0	2	0	14
3	FW	(Nigeria)	29	Emmanuel Emenike	13	0	0	0	0	13
4	FW	(Brazil)	11	Welliton	7	1	1	1	0	10
4	DF	(Russia)	23	Dmitri Kombarov	6	1	0	2	1	10
6	MF	(Republic of Ireland)	8	Aiden McGeady	3	0	1	1	0	5
7	DF	(Russia)	24	Kirill Kombarov	1	0	0	1	1	3
7				Own goal	3	0	0	0	0	3
9	MF	(Netherlands)	16	Demy de Zeeuw	2	0	0	0	0	2
9	DF	(Czech Republic)	17	Marek Suchý	2	0	0	0	0	2
9	MF	(Brazil)	7	Ibson	1	1	0	0	0	2
9	FW	(Russia)	14	Pavel Yakovlev	1	1	0	0	0	2
9	MF	(Georgia (country))	12	Jano Ananidze	1	0	0	1	0	2
9	MF	(Brazil)	10	Alex	0	0	0	2	0	2
12	DF	(Spain)	3	Rodri	1	0	0	0	0	1
12	FW	(Russia)	49	Aleksandr Kozlov	1	0	0	0	0	1
12	DF	(Argentina)	21	Nicolás Pareja	1	0	0	0	0	1
12	DF	(Russia)	34	Yevgeni Makeyev	1	0	0	0	0	1
12	MF	(Russia)	25	Diniyar Bilyaletdinov	1	0	0	0	0	1
12	MF	(Brazil)	6	Rafael Carioca	1	0	0	0	0	1
12	DF	(Argentina)	19	Marcos Rojo	0	1	0	0	0	1
TOTALS					68	7	2	11	4	92

=== Clean sheets ===
Place	Position	Nation	Number	Name	Premier League	2010-11 Russian Cup	2011-12 Russian Cup	2010-11 UEFA Europa League	2011-12 UEFA Europa League	Total
1	GK	(Ukraine)	31	Andriy Dykan	13	1	1	2	0	17
2	GK	(Russia)	32	Artyom Rebrov	3	0	0	0	0	3
3	GK	(Russia)	1	Nikolai Zabolotny	2	0	0	0	0	2
TOTALS					18	1	1	2	0	22

=== Disciplinary record ===
Number	Nation	Position	Name	Premier League		2010-11 Russian Cup		2011-12 Russian Cup		2010-11 UEFA Europa League		2011-12 UEFA Europa League		Total	
Number	Nation	Position	Name	Booked	Sent off (straight red)	Booked	Sent off (straight red)	Booked	Sent off (straight red)	Booked	Sent off (straight red)	Booked	Sent off (straight red)	Booked	Sent off (straight red)
3	(Spain)	DF	Rodri	9	0	0	0	1	0	0	0	0	0	10	0
5	(Russia)	MF	Aleksandr Sheshukov	4	0	2	1	0	0	0	0	0	0	6	1
6	(Brazil)	MF	Rafael Carioca	14	1	1	0	1	0	1	0	1	0	18	1
8	(Republic of Ireland)	MF	Aiden McGeady	7	0	1	0	0	0	1	0	0	0	9	0
9	(Brazil)	FW	Ari	1	0	1	0	0	0	0	0	0	0	2	0
11	(Brazil)	FW	Welliton	7	0	0	0	0	0	1	0	0	0	8	0
12	(Georgia (country))	MF	Jano Ananidze	1	0	0	0	0	0	0	0	0	0	1	0
13	(Russia)	DF	Fyodor Kudryashov	2	0	0	0	0	0	0	0	0	0	2	0
15	(Russia)	DF	Sergei Parshivlyuk	5	0	0	0	1	0	0	0	0	0	6	0
16	(Netherlands)	MF	Demy de Zeeuw	3	0	0	0	1	0	0	0	0	0	4	0
17	(Czech Republic)	DF	Marek Suchý	12	0	1	0	0	0	3	0	0	0	16	0
19	(Argentina)	DF	Marcos Rojo	5	0	1	0	2	1	3	0	0	0	11	1
21	(Argentina)	DF	Nicolás Pareja	7	1	0	0	1	0	0	0	0	0	8	1
22	(Russia)	FW	Artem Dzyuba	4	0	1	0	0	0	1	0	0	0	6	0
23	(Russia)	DF	Dmitri Kombarov	10	1	2	1	0	0	0	0	1	0	13	2
24	(Russia)	DF	Kirill Kombarov	6	0	0	0	0	0	1	0	0	0	7	0
27	(Russia)	MF	Aleksandr Zotov	1	0	0	0	0	0	0	0	0	0	1	0
29	(Nigeria)	FW	Emmanuel Emenike	5	2	0	0	0	0	0	0	0	0	5	2
31	(Ukraine)	GK	Andriy Dykan	1	0	0	0	0	0	1	0	0	0	2	0
32	(Russia)	GK	Artyom Rebrov	1	0	0	0	0	0	0	0	0	0	1	0
34	(Russia)	DF	Yevgeni Makeyev	2	0	1	0	0	0	1	0	0	0	4	0
37	(Russia)	DF	Sergei Bryzgalov	4	0	0	0	0	0	0	0	0	0	4	0
Players away on loan:
4	(Russia)	MF	Emin Mahmudov	3	0	1	0	0	0	0	0	0	0	4	0
14	(Russia)	FW	Pavel Yakovlev	2	0	1	0	0	0	0	0	0	0	3	0
Players who left Spartak Moscow season during the season:
7	(Brazil)	MF	Ibson	1	0	1	0	0	0	1	0	0	0	3	0
10	(Brazil)	MF	Alex	1	0	0	0	0	0	1	0	0	0	2	0
Total				118	5	14	2	7	1	15	0	2	0	156	8
