= Bryzgalov =

Bryzgalov (Russian: Брызгалов) and Bryzgalova (Russian: Брызгалова; feminine) is a Russian surname. Notable people with the surname include:

- Anastasia Bryzgalova (born 1992), Russian curler
- Dmitry Bryzgalov (born 1991), Russian acrobatic gymnast
- Ilya Bryzgalov (born 1980), Russian ice hockey player
- Sergei Bryzgalov (born 1992), Russian soccer player
