= Maleyev =

Maleyev (masculine, Russian: Малеев) or Maleyeva (feminine, Russian: Малеева) is a Russian surname. Notable people with the surname include:

- Aleksandr Maleyev (born 1947), Soviet artistic gymnast
- Artemi Maleyev (born 1991), Russian footballer
