= CDJ (disambiguation) =

CDJ is a specialized digital music player for DJing.

CDJ or cdj may refer to:

- CDJ Oran, an Algerian multisports club founded in 1894 in Oran
- CDJ Tamarite, a Spanish football team based in Tamarite de Litera, Aragon
- Churahi (ISO 639-3: cdj), a Western Pahari language of Himachal Pradesh, India
- Conceição do Araguaia Airport (IATA: CDJ), an airport serving Conceição do Araguaia, Brazil
