= Welliton =

Brazilian footballer

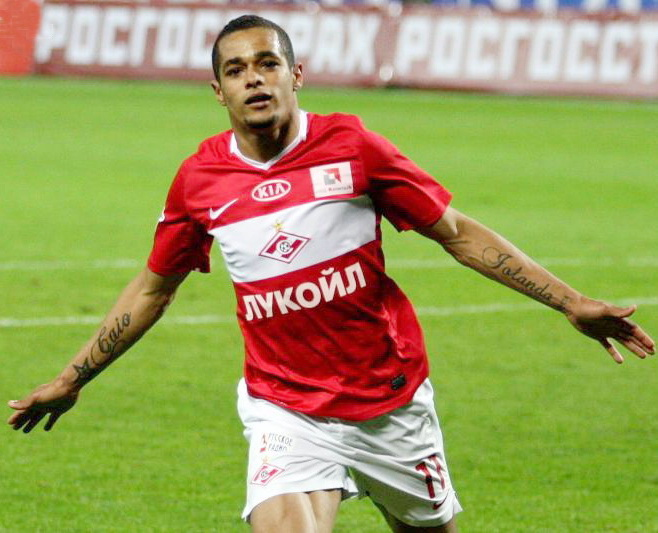

Personal information
- Full name: Welliton Soares de Morais
- Date of birth: 22 October 1986 (age 40)
- Place of birth: Conceição do Araguaia, Brazil
- Height: 1.75 m (5 ft 9 in)
- Position: Forward

Youth career
- Goiás

Senior career*
Years	Team	Apps	(Gls)
2005–2007	Goiás	53	(21)
2005	→ Ituano (loan)	32	(10)
2007–2014	Spartak Moscow	104	(57)
2013	→ Grêmio (loan)	13	(2)
2013	→ São Paulo (loan)	15	(3)
2014	→ Celta de Vigo (loan)	1	(0)
2014–2016	Mersin İdmanyurdu	51	(16)
2016–2017	Kayserispor	28	(12)
2017–2019	Sharjah	45	(27)
2019–2020	Al Wasl	14	(9)
2020–2021	Sharjah	21	(13)
2021	Goiás	4	(1)
2022	Novorizontino	13	(1)
Total		394	(172)
- * Club domestic league appearances and goals as of 3 June 2022

Welliton Soares de Morais (born 22 October 1986), or simply Welliton, is a Brazilian former footballer who played as a forward. During his time at Spartak Moscow, Welliton was a very prolific scorer and won the Russian Premier League top scorer title in the 2009 and 2010 seasons.

== Club career ==
=== Career in Brazil ===
Born in Conceição do Araguaia, Brazil, Welliton began his youth career at Bandeirante club before joining Goiás, where he started his professional football career. From October 2005 to December 2005, Welliton was loaned out to Ituano, where he scored ten times in thirty–two appearances for the side.

In December 2005, Welliton signed his first professional contract with the club, keeping him until 2009. The following month, he made his debut for Goiás, coming on as a late substitute, in a 1–1 draw against C.D. Cuenca in the first leg of the Copa Libertadores. Welliton then scored his first goals in the Group Stage of the Copa Libertadores, in a 3–0 win over Newell's Old Boys. It wasn't until on 16 April 2006 when he made his Goiás debut, starting the whole game, in a 0–0 draw against Santos. Welliton established himself in the first team at Goiás. A month later on 20 May 2006, Welliton scored his first league goal for the club, in a 3–2 win over Athletico Paranaense. Eight days later on 28 May 2006, he scored twice for the side, in a 2–1 win over São Caetano. Welliton scored three goals in three matches between 10 October 2006 and 28 October 2006. In the last two league matches of the season, he scored three times against Ponte Preta and a brace against Internacional. At the end of the 2006 season, Welliton made thirty–eight appearances and scoring twelve times in all competitions.

In the 2007 season, Welliton scored his first goal of the season, in a 3–1 win over Moto Club in the first round of the Copa do Brasil. He then scored four goals between 27 May 2007 and 10 June 2007, including a brace against Juventude. Welliton later added two more goals for the side, including a 1–0 win over Santos FC on 25 July 2007, which turns out to be his last appearance for the side. By the time of his departure, he made thirteen times and scoring seven times for Goiás this season.

=== Spartak Moscow ===
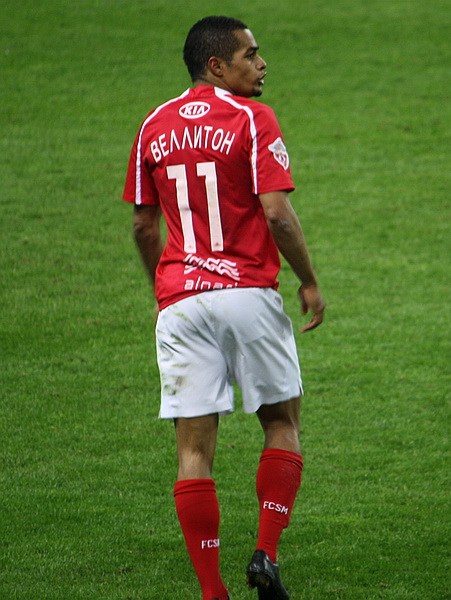
Welliton playing for Spartak Moscow in April 2010.

In July 2007, Welliton moved to Russian club Spartak Moscow, signing a five-year contract. he was previously linked with a move to Lokomotiv Moscow, Dynamo Kyiv and Dynamo Moscow. Upon joining the club, Welliton was given a number eleven shirt for the side.

Welliton made his Spartak Moscow debut on 5 August 2007, in a 3–2 win over Tom Tomsk. In the next match against Krylia Sovetov Samara, Welliton was a subject of racism by opposition fans, telling him to go home. Welliton was defended by Spartak Moscow and criticised the "racial abuse" in Russia as a disgrace. He then scored his first Spartak Moscow goal, in a 3–1 loss against Rubin Kazan on 25 August 2007. Welliton suffered an injury during a match against CSKA Moscow, resulting in him being substituted. After the match it was reported that Welliton would be sidelined for about three weeks. He added three more goals later in the season, where he finished the half of the season at Spartak Moscow, making twelve appearances and scoring four times. For the first four months at the club, Welliton spoke out his life in Russia.

To begin the 2008 season, Welliton scored six times in his first nine matches. Former Russia midfielder Aleksandr Mostovoi heaped praise on the young striker after his performance in a 3–0 away win, stating "He has overcome all problems with passage into a new country. He is young, fast, technical, an ideal artist who acts along the entire front line of attack, not just along the flanks as this past season." Unfortunately, his stellar start was cut short due to a muscle tear that forced him out of action for 10 months.

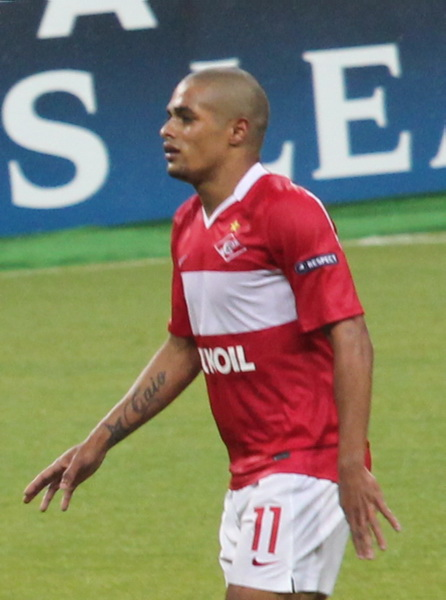
Welliton playing for Spartak Moscow in September 2010.

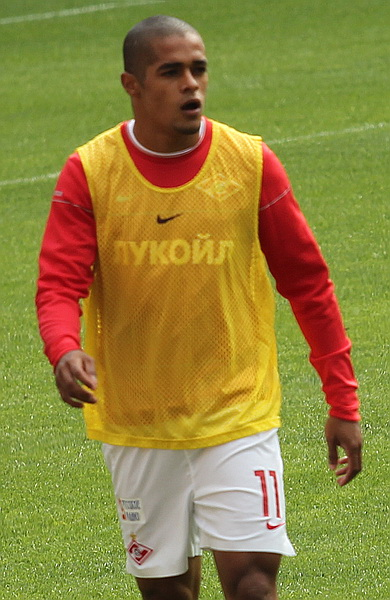
Welliton training for Spartak Moscow ahead of the match in August 2010.

After a successful return in 2009, Welliton made his return from training and played his first match for Spartak Moscow since returning from injury, in a 1–1 draw against Zenit Saint Petersburg. Three weeks later, Welliton then scored his first Spartak Moscow goal, in a 2–0 win over Spartak Nalchik. By the time he scored eleven times in sixteen appearances, he scored his first career hat-trick on 8 August 2009 at Spartak Nalchik. His excellent performance in his second season at Spartak Moscow also rewarded him with a long-term contract with Spartak Moscow. Later in the 2009 season, Welliton helped Spartak Moscow early to a prime position to qualify for the UEFA Champions League after finishing a dismal 8th place in 2008. He also finished the season as the league's top scorer for 2009 season, with 21 goals.

In the 2010 season, Welliton again became the top scorer, this time with 19 goals. He started he first half of the season well, scoring seven goals in ten appearances, including scoring a brace against Anzhi Makhachkala on 6 May 2010. However, he was sidelined for three weeks after injuring his ligaments of the ankle joint of the left leg during a match against Metallurg Lipetsk in the fifth round of Russian Cup. After making his return in the field against CSKA Moscow, Welliton scored two consecutive hat-tricks. On 15 August he netted three goals in an away game against Russian rivals Lokomotiv Moscow, which ended 2–3. On 21 August 2010, he scored another hat-trick, this time against FC Tom Tomsk in a 4–2 win at home. The latter was scored just in 6 minutes and became the fastest hat-trick in the entire history of Russia. Because of this, Welliton's performance attracted interest from clubs around Europe, including La Liga side RCD Mallorca. Welliton was able to finish the season as the league's top scorer for 2010 for the second time running, with 19 goals. During the season, he scored six goals in the final seven matches to secure the scoring title and a berth in the 2010–11 UEFA Champions League group stage for Moscow, where he scored against Marseille However, Welliton was sent-off in the last game of the group stage against Marseille when he involved in an incident with Souleymane Diawara. At the end of the season, Welliton was awarded the club's Player of the Year.

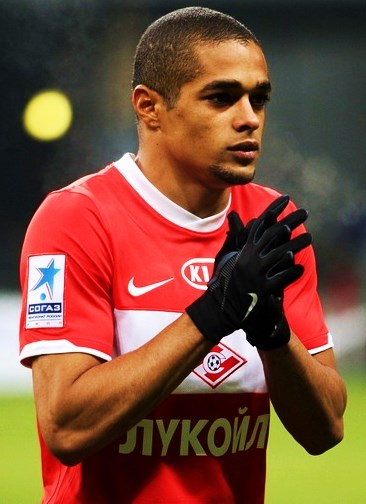
Welliton in the match against Volga.

At the start of the 2011–12 season he suffered a series of injuries. It started off when he injured his heel in training. After making his return, Welliton scored against Ajax in the return leg of last 16 of Europa League, with a 3–0 win and then against Volga Nizhny Novgorod in the league. However, his return was short-lived when he injured his adductors in training. After making his return briefly, where at one point, he was captain during the match against Spartak Nalchik, his return was short-lived once again when he suffered a hamstring injury during a match against CSKA Moscow, requiring operation. Despite interest from Rubin Kazan and Wolfsburg, Welliton remained at the club. After making his return, Welliton then scored four goals between 26 June 2011 and 8 July 2011 before adding another on 28 August 2011 against CSKA Moscow. But during the match, Welliton was involved in a collision with opposition goalkeeper's Igor Akinfeev, which resulted in Welliton being booked. Initially given six match ban, this was reduced to a three match via Spartak's appeal. After returning from suspension, Welliton continued to suffer injuries when he hurt his back in late-October and fractured his collarbone after colliding with CSKA Moscow's player Vasili Berezutski during a match on 19 March 2012, which saw him sidelined for the rest of the season. Welliton ended his 2011–12 season with 21 appearances and scoring seven times.

In the 2012–13 season, Welliton made his return from injury, where he was included in the opening game of the season against Alania Vladikavkaz. But Welliton's injury problem haunted him once again when he injured his thigh during the match against Terek Grozny, sidelining him for weeks. Welliton was left out of the squad and eventually fell out with Unai Emery due to lack of effort in training and performance. As a result, Welliton attracted further interest from Metalist Kharkiv, Rubin Kazan, Flamengo and Fenerbahçe.

During his seven years career at Spartak Moscow, Welliton made 132 appearances and scored 61 times.

=== Loan spells ===
On 6 February 2013, Welliton was loaned to Brazilian club Grêmio. Welliton made his Grêmio debut on 14 February 2013, coming on as a substitute for Eduardo Vargas in the 73rd minute, in a 2–1 loss against Huachipato in group stage of Copa Libertadores. On 26 May 2013, Welliton made his league debut in the opening game of the season, coming on as a substitute for Hernán Barcos, in a 2–0 win over Náutico. However, Welliton made only ten appearances in all competitions, as he struggled to score.

He moved to São Paulo later. With a few players available on transfer market, Paulo Autuori praised Welliton as a new hiring for his club. According to Autuori, Welliton "has the profile what we are looking for, with balance and presence to score goals. He can play as a winger or a center forward." To carry out the transfer, São Paulo managed to reach a complex agreement with Grêmio. It involved some benefits for Grêmio on Rhodolfo's loan contract, and stipulated that the side from São Paulo would pay half of his salary (R$200,000), the rest went to the side from Porto Alegre. After making his debut as a substitute against Botafogo on 1 September 2013, Welliton scored his first goal two weeks later on 19 September 2013, in a 1–0 win over Atlético Mineiro. Welliton later added two more goals later in the season against Náutico and Fluminense. After making 19 appearances and scoring four times, the club was keen to sign him permanently, but eventually decided against over the price tag.

On 31 January 2014 he was loaned to Celta de Vigo in La Liga until the end of the season. In May, Welliton was given a maximum fine by the club for a drink-driving offence. His time at Celta Viga was forgettable, as Welliton made only one appearance, coming on as a substitute in the 87th minute against Elche. To make things worse, Welliton suffered a hamstring injury that sidelined him rest of the season.

=== Mersin İdmanyurdu ===
On 20 August 2014, Welliton moved to the Turkish side Mersin İdmanyurdu, signing a two-year contract. Spartak Moscow reportedly received around €1 million from the transfer.

After being on the bench for the first two matches, Welliton made his Mersin İdmanyurdu debut as a substitute in a 2–0 win over Çaykur Rizespor on 20 September 2014. Four days later, Welliton scored his first goal for the club, in the second round of Turkish Cup, in a 3–0 win over Kemer Tekirovaspor. On 8 November 2014, Welliton scored his first league goal for the club, in a 2–1 win over Balıkesirspor, followed by his second in the next game two weeks later against Akhisar Belediyespor. Welliton then scored his first hat-trick for the club and provided two assists in a 6–2 win over Kasımpaşa. Towards the end of the season, Welliton later added four more goals against Balikesirspor, Konyaspor, Gençlerbirliği and İstanbul Başakşehir. In his first season at Mersin İdmanyurdu, Welliton made 34 appearances and scored 13 goals in all competitions.

In the 2015–16 season, Welliton scored two goals in two consecutive matches against Kayserispor and Galatasaray despite the clu's poor start following three losses at the start of the season. Welliton later scored two goals in two consecutive matches for the second time against Eskişehirspor and Çaykur Rizespor. While he scored six goals in 21 appearances, Welliton's injury problem contributed to the club's relegation.

Following Mersin İdmanyurdu relegation to the TFF First League, Welliton's future was in doubt, as his contract was due to expire on 30 June 2016.

=== Kayserispor ===
On 1 July 2016, Welliton signed a two-year contract with Kayserispor.

Welliton made his Kayserispor debut in the opening game of the season, starting the whole game, in a 2–0 loss against Akhisar Belediyespor. He then scored three goals in the next two matches against Fenerbahçe (twice) and Galatasaray. His goal scoring form continued, adding three more goals to his tally between 20 September 2016 and 1 October 2016. Since joining the club, Welliton became a first team regular for the side throughout the first half of the season. This lasted until he missed two matches in January after being dropped from the squad following an incident with the club's management. Following his return to the first team, Welliton continued his goal scoring form, scoring against Fenerbahçe, Gençlerbirliği, Bursaspor and Çaykur Rizespor (twice). He then scored a brace on 29 April 2017, in a 3–0 win over Alanyaspor, adding his fifteenth goal of the season. Despite missing out the remaining league matches of the 2016–17 season, Welliton went on to make thirty–four appearances and scoring twenty–five times in all competitions.

Ahead of the 2017–18 season, Welliton was linked a move away from Kayserispor, which led him to not play for the side again in September 2017.

=== Sharjah FC ===
On 26 September 2017, Welliton moved to UAE Pro-League side Sharjah, signing a two–year contract for 1.5 million Euros.

Welliton made his Sharjah FC debut on 30 September 2017, where he came on as a substitute for Omar Jumaa during the second half, in a 2–1 loss against Al-Wasl. It wasn't until on 13 October 2017 when he scored his first goal for the club, in a 3–2 loss against Hatta Club. Welliton scored two goals in two matches between 30 November 2017 and 8 December 2017 against Al Jazira and Dibba Al-Fujairah Club. He since established himself in the starting eleven for the side and started every match until being suspended in early–February. After returning to the first team, Welliton scored two more goals, including against Dibba Al-Fujairah Club in the last game of the season. At the end of the 2017–18 season, he went on to make nineteen appearances and scoring seven times in his first season at Sharjah FC.

At the start of the 2018–19 season, Welliton started the season well when he scored five goals in the first two league matches, including scoring four times against Al-Nasr on 14 September 2018. His goal scoring form continued throughout 2018, including scoring a brace on three occasions and adding fifteen goals to his tally. He continued to be a first team regular for the side in his second season. His performance throughout October earned him the league's October Player of the Month. However, later in the 2018–19 season, Welliton's goalscoring form soon dropped, scoring four times, leading Sebastián Tagliabúe leap over him as the league's top scorer. Despite this, Welliton, along with Tagliabúe and Igor Coronado, were nominated the league's Golden Ball for Best Foreign Player, but lost out to Coronado. One of the four goals he scored was a 3–2 win over Al Wahda, resulting winning their first title since 1996 in 2019 with a record of only one loss. At the end of the 2018–19 season, Welliton made twenty–six appearances and scoring twenty times in all competitions.

== International career ==
Welliton has not been called up by Brazil and has expressed interest in representing Russia.

After playing in Russia for over three years, Welliton said it would be an honour to play for the national team, citing his preparation as a reason. However, Welliton's decision to play for Russia was met with a mixed reception, with then Russia's captain Andrey Arshavin and Leonid Fedun arguing against having Welliton in the squad, while the president of Russian Football Union, Sergey Fursenko, Miroslav Romaschenko and public opinion in Russia supported Welliton to play for the national side.

In November 2011 Spartak Moscow announced they were in the process of helping Welliton acquire a Russian passport. Should Welliton represented the Russia national team, he would be the first foreign footballer born outside of Russia to do so. However, the process of never happened.

== Personal life ==
Born and raised in Conceição do Araguaia, Brazil, Welliton grew up in poor family and has two older brother and a younger sister. On 27 July 2007, Welliton became a father when his wife, Monica, gave birth to a son, Kayu. Welliton and Monica were married when they were sixteen. Welliton also has a tattoo on his left arm with his mother name, Yolanda.

In May 2014, Welliton was arrested for driving under influence in Spain. Welliton was charged and had his driving revoked, in addition, of 9000 euros.

== Honours ==
=== Club ===
Goiás

- Goiás State League: 2006

Sharjah

- UAE Pro League: 2018–19

=== Individual ===
- Russian Premier League top scorer (2): 2009 (21 goals), 2010 (19 goals)
