= Conceição do Araguaia Airport =

Airport in Pará, Brazil

Conceição do Araguaia Airport Aeroporto de Conceição do Araguaia
- IATA: CDJ; ICAO: SBAA; LID: PA0008

Summary
- Airport type: Public
- Serves: Conceição do Araguaia
- Time zone: BRT (UTC−03:00)
- Elevation AMSL: 199 m (653 ft)
- Coordinates: 08°20′55″S 049°18′11″W

Map
- Location in Brazil CDJ (Brazil)

Runways
Direction	Length		Surface
Direction	m	ft	Surface
08/26	1,800	5,905	Asphalt
- Sources: ANAC, DECEA

Conceição do Araguaia Airport (IATA: CDJ, ICAO: SBAA) is the airport serving Conceição do Araguaia, Brazil.

== Access ==
The airport is located 10 km (6 mi) from downtown Conceição do Araguaia.

== See also ==
- List of airports in Brazil
