= Temuri Bukiya =

Russian professional football player

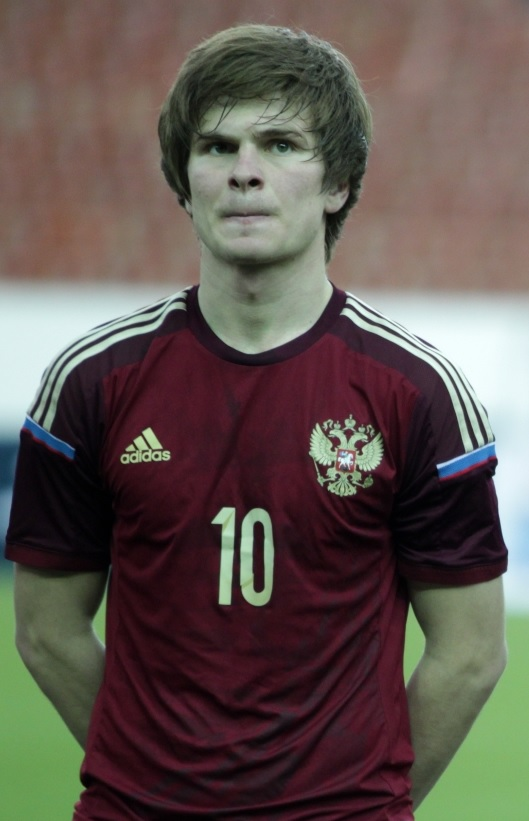
- Bukiya with Russia U-21 in 2016

Personal information
- Full name: Temuri Kobayevich Bukiya
- Date of birth: 2 April 1994 (age 32)
- Place of birth: Sochi, Russia
- Height: 1.76 m (5 ft 9 in)
- Position: Midfielder

Youth career
- –2010: Saturn Moscow Oblast
- 2011–2012: Spartak Moscow
- 2013: České Budějovice

Senior career*
Years	Team	Apps	(Gls)
2013–2016	Kuban Krasnodar	1	(0)
2014–2016	→ Volgar Astrakhan (loan)	44	(3)
2016–2018	Volgar Astrakhan	56	(2)
2018–2019	Spartak Vladikavkaz	21	(0)
2019	Fakel Voronezh	20	(0)
2020	West Armenia	0	(0)
2020–2021	Druzhba Maykop	24	(0)
2021	Luki-Energiya	9	(0)
2022	Kyran	4	(0)
2022–2023	Elektron Veliky Novgorod	23	(0)

International career
2009	Russia U-15	2	(0)
2010	Russia U-16	2	(0)
2010	Russia U-17	3	(1)
2015–2016	Russia U-21	11	(0)
- * Club domestic league appearances and goals

Temuri Kobayevich Bukiya (Russian: Темури Кобаевич Букия; born 2 April 1994) is a Russian former professional football player.

== Club career ==
He made his debut in the Russian Premier League on 28 April 2014 for FC Kuban Krasnodar in a game against FC Spartak Moscow.
