= Conceição do Araguaia =

- Municipality
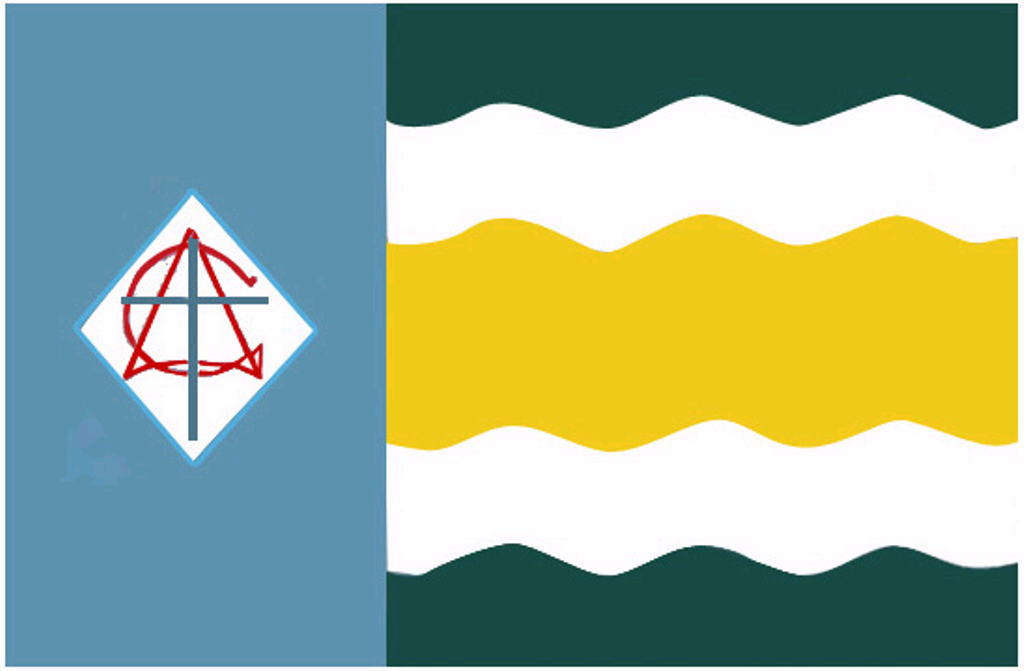
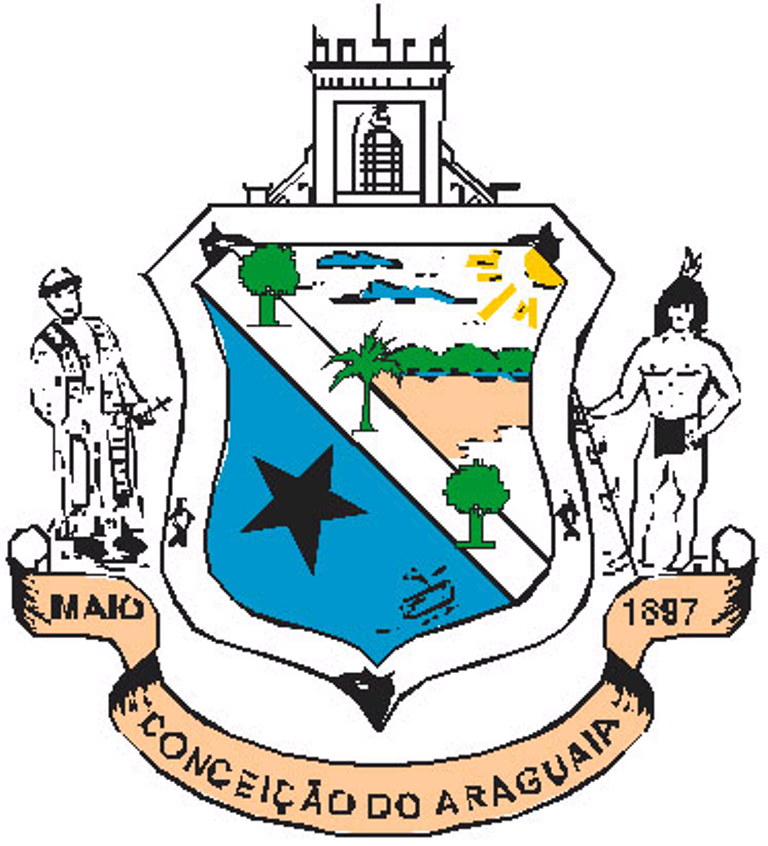
- Flag Coat of arms

- Location in Brazil
- Coordinates: 7°33′14″S 49°42′46″W
- Country: Brazil
- Region: Northern
- State: Pará
- Mesoregion: Sudeste Paraense

Population (2020)
  - Total: 47,991
- Time zone: UTC−3 (BRT)

Conceição do Araguaia is a municipality in the state of Pará in the Northern region of Brazil.

The city is served by Conceição do Araguaia Airport.

== Climate ==
Conceição do Araguaia experiences a tropical savanna climate (Köppen: Aw) with hot temperatures, high humidity, and distinct wet and dry seasons.

The city experiences a wet season from October to April. The dry season extends from June to September.

Climate data for Conceição do Araguaia (1991–2020)
Month	Jan	Feb	Mar	Apr	May	Jun	Jul	Aug	Sep	Oct	Nov	Dec	Year
Mean daily maximum °C (°F)	31.8 (89.2)	31.7 (89.1)	31.9 (89.4)	32.6 (90.7)	33.7 (92.7)	34.8 (94.6)	35.8 (96.4)	37.1 (98.8)	36.5 (97.7)	34.4 (93.9)	32.8 (91.0)	32.1 (89.8)	33.8 (92.8)
Daily mean °C (°F)	26.3 (79.3)	26.3 (79.3)	26.5 (79.7)	26.9 (80.4)	27.7 (81.9)	27.8 (82.0)	28.0 (82.4)	28.8 (83.8)	28.9 (84.0)	27.8 (82.0)	26.9 (80.4)	26.5 (79.7)	27.4 (81.3)
Mean daily minimum °C (°F)	22.5 (72.5)	22.5 (72.5)	22.7 (72.9)	22.9 (73.2)	23.0 (73.4)	21.8 (71.2)	20.9 (69.6)	21.3 (70.3)	22.5 (72.5)	22.8 (73.0)	22.6 (72.7)	22.7 (72.9)	22.4 (72.3)
Average precipitation mm (inches)	249.9 (9.84)	265.2 (10.44)	274.5 (10.81)	195.3 (7.69)	97.1 (3.82)	10.6 (0.42)	2.9 (0.11)	5.9 (0.23)	46.5 (1.83)	135.8 (5.35)	221.4 (8.72)	238.5 (9.39)	1,743.6 (68.65)
Average precipitation days (≥ 1.0 mm)	17.1	16.7	17.4	13.8	6.6	1.3	0.5	0.8	3.9	8.1	12.9	15.4	114.5
Average relative humidity (%)	86.9	87.0	87.1	86.0	80.7	72.4	66.1	63.6	68.9	78.7	84.6	86.2	79.0
Average dew point °C (°F)	24.3 (75.7)	24.4 (75.9)	24.6 (76.3)	24.9 (76.8)	24.7 (76.5)	23.2 (73.8)	22.0 (71.6)	22.0 (71.6)	23.2 (73.8)	24.2 (75.6)	24.5 (76.1)	24.4 (75.9)	23.9 (75.0)
Mean monthly sunshine hours	143.7	133.3	152.7	172.1	232.9	278.7	300.6	284.9	204.5	179.4	149.5	140.9	2,373.2
Source: NOAA

== See also ==
- List of municipalities in Pará
