= Dmitri Kombarov =

Russian footballer

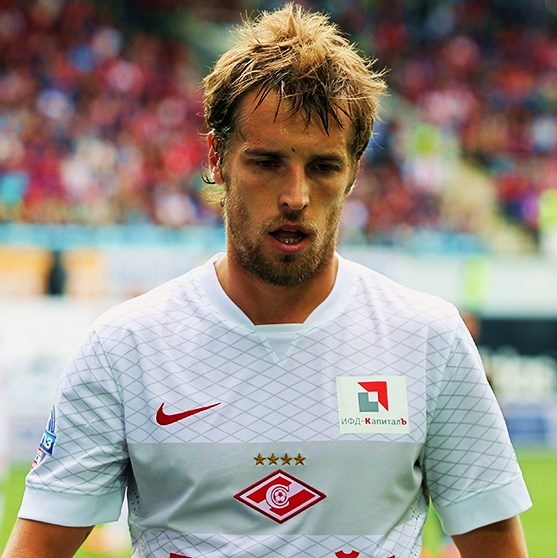
- Kombarov with Spartak Moscow in 2014

Personal information
- Full name: Dmitri Vladimirovich Kombarov
- Date of birth: 22 January 1987 (age 39)
- Place of birth: Moscow, Soviet Union
- Height: 1.82 m (6 ft 0 in)
- Position: Left back

Team information
- Current team: Pari Nizhny Novgorod (assistant manager)

Youth career
- 1993–2001: Spartak Moscow
- 2001–2006: Dynamo Moscow

Senior career*
Years	Team	Apps	(Gls)
2006–2010	Dynamo Moscow	132	(12)
2010–2019	Spartak Moscow	226	(21)
2019–2021	Krylia Sovetov Samara	50	(0)
Total		408	(33)

International career
2007–2008	Russia U-21	13	(1)
2011	Russia-2	2	(0)
2012–2018	Russia	47	(2)

Managerial career
- 2022–2024: Zvezda St. Petersburg
- 2024–2025: Spartak-2 Moscow
- 2025–2026: Chayka Peschanokopskoye
- 2026–: Pari Nizhny Novgorod (assistant)
- * Club domestic league appearances and goals

Dmitri Vladimirovich Kombarov (Russian: Дми́трий Влади́мирович Комба́ров, IPA: [ˈdmʲitrʲɪj vlɐˈdʲimʲɪrəvʲɪtɕ kɐmˈbarəf]; born 22 January 1987) is a Russian football coach and a former player who played as a left midfielder or a left back. He is the assistant manager of Pari Nizhny Novgorod. He is an identical twin brother of Kirill Kombarov. Known for his technical skills and pace, he played as an attack minded left back.

== Career ==
=== Dynamo Moscow ===
Dmitri started playing football at the age of 4. In 1993, Dmitri and his twin brother Kirill joined the Spartak Moscow football academy. After a conflict with the school coaches, the brothers left Spartak and joined the Dynamo Moscow academy.

Dmitri made his first appearance for the main squad of Dynamo on 13 July 2005 in a Russian Cup game against Dynamo Bryansk.

=== FC Spartak Moscow ===
In August 2010, the Kombarov brothers left Dynamo Moscow for their city rivals Spartak Moscow where they started their football education. Despite being a left defender, at the end of the 2012–13 season he finished as the top scorer of the team with 7 goals.

On 19 June 2019, he was released from his Spartak contract by mutual consent.

=== Krylia Sovetov Samara ===
On 9 July 2019, Russian Premier League club PFC Krylia Sovetov Samara confirmed that Kombarov will join the squad for the 2019–20 season.

== International career ==
His first appearance in Russia national football team was in February 2012, in the friendly match with Denmark. He was confirmed for the finalized UEFA Euro 2012 squad on 25 May 2012. He scored his first international goal in a friendly match against Armenia on 5 March 2014. On 2 June 2014, he was included in the Russia's 2014 FIFA World Cup squad.

He scored his first competitive goal for Russia against Liechtenstein in a 2016 European Championship qualification match.

On 11 May 2018, he was included in Russia's extended 2018 FIFA World Cup squad as a back-up. He was not included in the finalized World Cup squad.

=== International goals ===
#	Date	Venue	Opponent	Score	Result	Competition
1.	5 March 2014	Kuban Stadium, Krasnodar, Russia	Armenia	2–0	2–0	Friendly
2.	8 September 2014	Arena Khimki, Khimki, Russia	Liechtenstein	3–0	4–0	UEFA Euro 2016 Qualification

== Coaching career ==
On 19 January 2024, Kombarov was appointed manager of the resurrected Spartak-2 Moscow.

== Career statistics ==
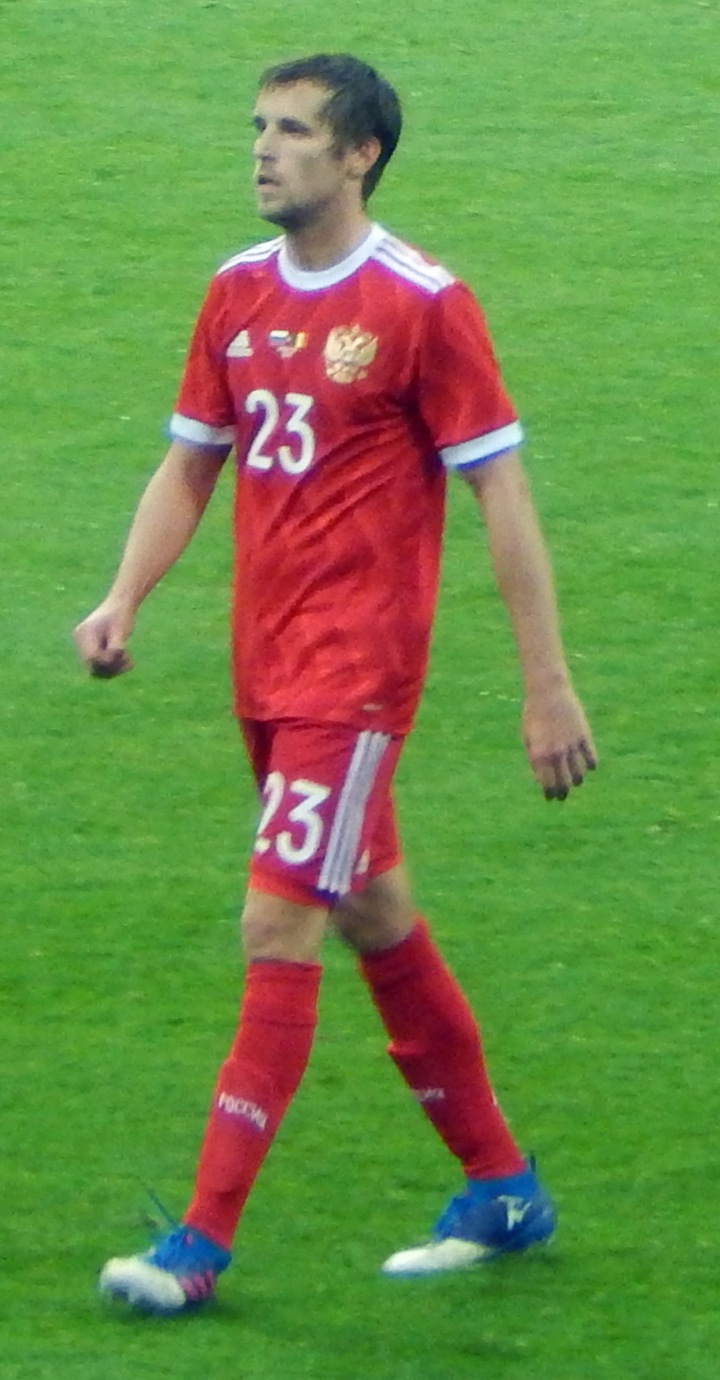
Against team Belgium in 2017

As of 10 December 2017

Club	Season	League		Cup		Europe		Total	
Club	Season	Apps	Goals	Apps	Goals	Apps	Goals	Apps	Goals
Dynamo Moscow	2005	1	0	1	0	—		2	0
Dynamo Moscow	2006	27	1	6	1	—		33	2
Dynamo Moscow	2007	29	2	6	1	—		35	3
Dynamo Moscow	2008	30	1	2	0	—		32	1
Dynamo Moscow	2009	29	4	3	0	4	0	36	4
Dynamo Moscow	2010	16	4	1	0	—		17	4
Total		132	12	19	2	4	0	155	14
Spartak Moscow	2010	14	1	—		6	0	20	1
Spartak Moscow	2011–12	40	6	4	1	7	3	51	11
Spartak Moscow	2012–13	29	7	0	0	8	1	28	7
Spartak Moscow	2013-14	28	2	2	1	1	0	31	3
Spartak Moscow	2014-15	25	2	0	0	—		25	2
Spartak Moscow	2015-16	25	2	1	0	—		26	2
Spartak Moscow	2016-17	27	0	1	0	2	0	30	0
Spartak Moscow	2017-18	25	0	3	0	6	0	35	0
Total		213	20	11	2	30	4	246	26
Career total		345	32	30	4	34	4	401	40

== Honours ==
Spartak Moscow

- Russian Premier League: 2016-17
- Russian Super Cup: 2017

Individual

- List of 33 top players of the Russian league: #2 (2013/14).
