= Sergei Bryzgalov =

Russian footballer

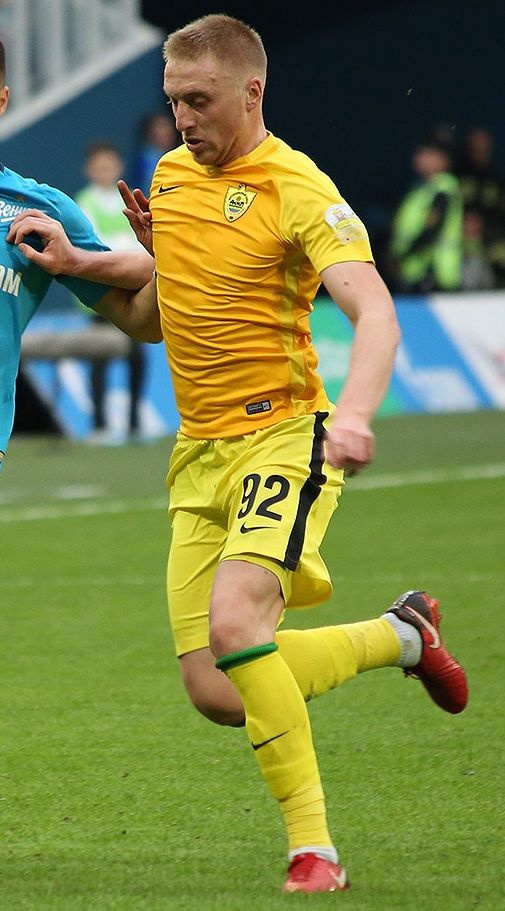
- Bryzgalov with Anzhi Makhachkala in 2018

Personal information
- Full name: Sergei Vladimirovich Bryzgalov
- Date of birth: 15 November 1992 (age 33)
- Place of birth: Pavlovo-na-Oke, Russia
- Height: 1.82 m (6 ft 0 in)
- Position: Centre-back

Youth career
- Master-Saturn Yegoryevsk

Senior career*
Years	Team	Apps	(Gls)
2010	Saturn Ramenskoye	1	(0)
2011–2016	Spartak Moscow	47	(1)
2014–2016	→ Spartak-2 Moscow	23	(0)
2016	Terek Grozny	4	(0)
2017–2018	Anzhi Makhachkala	32	(2)
2018–2019	Ural Yekaterinburg	16	(1)
2019–2025	Fakel Voronezh	80	(5)

International career
2010	Russia U18	5	(0)
2011	Russia U19	8	(0)
2012–2013	Russia U21	2	(0)
- * Club domestic league appearances and goals

Sergei Vladimirovich Bryzgalov (Серге́й Влади́мирович Брызга́лов; born 15 November 1992) is a Russian former footballer who played as a centre-back.

== Club career ==
He made his debut in the Russian Premier League on 28 March 2010 for Saturn Ramenskoye in a game against Rostov.

== Career statistics ==
=== Club ===
As of match played 24 May 2025

Appearances and goals by club, season and competition
Club	Season	League			Cup		Europe		Other		Total	
Club	Season	Division	Apps	Goals	Apps	Goals	Apps	Goals	Apps	Goals	Apps	Goals
Saturn Ramenskoye	2010	Russian Premier League	1	0	0	0	–		–		1	0
Spartak Moscow	2011–12	Russian Premier League	18	0	0	0	0	0	–		18	0
Spartak Moscow	2012–13	Russian Premier League	11	1	2	0	3 (Note: Appearances in the UEFA Champions League)	0	–		16	1
Spartak Moscow	2013–14	Russian Premier League	4	0	0	0	0	0	–		4	0
Spartak Moscow	2014–15	Russian Premier League	8	0	0	0	–		–		8	0
Spartak Moscow	2015–16	Russian Premier League	6	0	0	0	–		–		6	0
Spartak Moscow	Total		47	1	2	0	3	0	0	0	52	1
Spartak-2 Moscow	2014–15	Russian Second League	3	0	–		–		–		3	0
Spartak-2 Moscow	2015–16	Russian First League	20	0	–		–		1 (Note: Appearances in the FNL Cup)	0	21	0
Spartak-2 Moscow	Total		23	0	0	0	0	0	1	0	24	0
Terek Grozny	2016–17	Russian Premier League	4	0	0	0	–		–		4	0
Anzhi Makhachkala	2016–17	Russian Premier League	7	0	1	0	–		–		8	0
Anzhi Makhachkala	2017–18	Russian Premier League	25	2	0	0	–		–		25	2
Anzhi Makhachkala	Total		32	2	1	0	0	0	0	0	33	2
ral Yekaterinburg	2018–19	Russian Premier League	16	1	5	0	–		2	0	23	1
Fakel Voronezh	2019–20	Russian First League	8	0	0	0	–		3	0	11	0
Fakel Voronezh	2020–21	Russian First League	35	4	0	0	–		–		35	4
Fakel Voronezh	2021–22	Russian First League	19	1	1	0	–		–		20	1
Fakel Voronezh	2022–23	Russian Premier League	3	0	2	0	–		–		5	0
Fakel Voronezh	2023–24	Russian Premier League	10	0	5	0	–		–		15	0
Fakel Voronezh	2024–25	Russian Premier League	5	0	5	0	—		—		10	0
Fakel Voronezh	Total		80	5	13	0	0	0	3	0	96	5
Career total			203	9	21	0	3	0	6	0	233	9
