= Artemi Maleyev =

Russian footballer

Personal information
- Full name: Artemi Yevgenyevich Maleyev
- Date of birth: 4 May 1991 (age 35)
- Place of birth: Omsk, Russian SFSR
- Height: 1.78 m (5 ft 10 in)
- Position: Midfielder

Youth career
- –2006: FC Dynamo Omsk
- 2006–2011: FC Spartak Moscow

Senior career*
Years	Team	Apps	(Gls)
2011–2012	FC KAMAZ Naberezhnye Chelny	15	(0)
2012	FC Tyumen	7	(2)
2013–2015	FC Avangard Kursk	63	(17)
2015–2016	FC Neftekhimik Nizhnekamsk	25	(4)
2016–2018	FC Baltika Kaliningrad	36	(0)
2018	FK Spartaks Jūrmala	26	(5)
2019–2021	FC SKA-Khabarovsk	70	(5)
2021–2022	FC Tyumen	25	(10)
2022–2024	FC Sibir Novosibirsk	52	(7)
2024–2026	FC Irtysh Omsk	24	(0)

International career
2008	Russia U-17	11	(2)
2009	Russia U-18	8	(0)
2010	Russia U-19	5	(1)
- * Club domestic league appearances and goals as of 13 June 2026

Artemi Yevgenyevich Maleyev (Russian: Артемий Евгеньевич Малеев; born 4 May 1991) is a Russian football midfielder.

== Club career ==
He made his professional debut for FC KAMAZ Naberezhnye Chelny on 12 September 2011 in a Russian Football National League game against FC Dynamo Bryansk.
