= List of Russian football transfers winter 2022–23 =

This is a list of Russian football transfers in the 2022–23 winter transfer window by club. Only clubs of the 2022–23 Russian Premier League are included.

== Russian Premier League 2022–23 ==
=== Akhmat Grozny ===
In: Note: Flags indicate national team as defined under FIFA eligibility rules; some limited exceptions apply. Players may hold more than one non-FIFA nationality.

No.	Pos.	Nation	Player
5	DF	BIH	Miloš Šatara (from (Belarus) Shakhtyor Soligorsk)
24	MF	MNE	Zaim Divanović (from (Belarus) Shakhtyor Soligorsk)
33	MF	RUS	Minkail Matsuyev
47	FW	CIV	Néné Gbamblé (from (Slovenia) Celje)
53	MF	RUS	Abubakar Apkayev (from own academy)
99	FW	BLR	Ilya Chernyak (from (Belarus) Shakhtyor Soligorsk)

Out: Note: Flags indicate national team as defined under FIFA eligibility rules; some limited exceptions apply. Players may hold more than one non-FIFA nationality.

No.	Pos.	Nation	Player
10	FW	RUS	Khalid Kadyrov (retired)
19	MF	RUS	Kirill Folmer (end of loan from Rostov)
44	DF	RUS	Yuri Zhuravlyov (to Torpedo Moscow)
72	GK	RUS	Suliman Murtazayev
95	FW	RUS	Abubakar Kadyrov (retired)
—	FW	ROU	Gabriel Iancu (on loan to (Romania) Hermannstadt, previously on loan to (Romania) U Craiova 1948)
—	FW	RUS	Idris Umayev (on loan to (Kazakhstan) Aktobe, previously on loan to Yenisey Krasnoyarsk)

=== CSKA Moscow ===
In: Note: Flags indicate national team as defined under FIFA eligibility rules; some limited exceptions apply. Players may hold more than one non-FIFA nationality.

No.	Pos.	Nation	Player
51	MF	RUS	Dzhamalutdin Abdulkadyrov (from own academy)
52	MF	RUS	Artyom Bandikyan (from own academy)
53	MF	RUS	Kirill Glebov (from own academy)
54	MF	RUS	Aleksandr Dyomin (from own academy)
57	MF	RUS	Matvey Kislyak (from own academy)
58	MF	RUS	Makar Pestov (from own academy)
61	FW	RUS	Roman Chenchikov (from own academy)
67	DF	RUS	Ilya Kazakov
71	MF	RUS	Dmitry Kalayda
73	DF	RUS	Yegor Shevelev
77	DF	RUS	Ilya Agapov (from Pari NN)
79	DF	RUS	Ruslan Ozdoyev
80	MF	RUS	Yaroslav Arbuzov
81	FW	RUS	Mikhail Gaynov
83	DF	RUS	Denis Pershin
87	DF	RUS	Sergey Vasilyev
92	DF	RUS	Yegor Noskov
93	FW	RUS	Stanislav Lapinsky
96	MF	RUS	Aleksey Slivin
97	FW	RUS	Yaroslav Dol

Out: Note: Flags indicate national team as defined under FIFA eligibility rules; some limited exceptions apply. Players may hold more than one non-FIFA nationality.

No.	Pos.	Nation	Player
3	DF	BRA	Bruno Fuchs (on loan to (Brazil) Atlético Mineiro)
21	FW	ARG	Adolfo Gaich (on loan to (Italy) Hellas Verona)
45	GK	RUS	Danila Bokov (on loan to Salyut Belgorod)
46	FW	RUS	Vladislav Yakovlev (on loan to Pari NN)
48	DF	RUS	Dmitry Kaptilovich (to Zvezda St. Petersburg)
—	DF	RUS	Mário Fernandes (on loan to (Brazil) Internacional, previously on career pause)
—	MF	CRO	Kristijan Bistrović (on loan to (Netherlands) Fortuna Sittard, previously on loan to (Italy) Lecce)

=== Dynamo Moscow ===
In: Note: Flags indicate national team as defined under FIFA eligibility rules; some limited exceptions apply. Players may hold more than one non-FIFA nationality.

No.	Pos.	Nation	Player
5	DF	SRB	Milan Majstorović (from (Serbia) Vojvodina)

Out: Note: Flags indicate national team as defined under FIFA eligibility rules; some limited exceptions apply. Players may hold more than one non-FIFA nationality.

No.	Pos.	Nation	Player

=== Fakel Voronezh ===
In: Note: Flags indicate national team as defined under FIFA eligibility rules; some limited exceptions apply. Players may hold more than one non-FIFA nationality.

No.	Pos.	Nation	Player
17	FW	FRA	Mohamed Brahimi (on loan from (Bulgaria) Botev Plovdiv)
20	FW	RUS	Yevgeni Markov (from Arsenal Tula)
22	MF	FRA	Réda Rabeï (on loan from (Bulgaria) Botev Plovdiv)
23	MF	RUS	Vyacheslav Yakimov (on loan from Krasnodar)
64	MF	RUS	Andrey Ivlev (from Spartak Moscow academy)

Out: Note: Flags indicate national team as defined under FIFA eligibility rules; some limited exceptions apply. Players may hold more than one non-FIFA nationality.

No.	Pos.	Nation	Player
4	DF	RUS	Aslan Dashayev (to Volga Ulyanovsk)
5	DF	RUS	Yevgeni Shlyakov (to Torpedo Moscow)
8	MF	RUS	Alikhan Shavayev (to Rotor Volgograd)
34	MF	RUS	Oleg Dmitriyev (to Rodina Moscow)
76	MF	RUS	Nikita Yershov (on loan to Irtysh Omsk)

=== Khimki ===
In: Note: Flags indicate national team as defined under FIFA eligibility rules; some limited exceptions apply. Players may hold more than one non-FIFA nationality.

No.	Pos.	Nation	Player
2	DF	SRB	Petar Golubović (from (Norway) Aalesund)
5	DF	SRB	Nikola Antić (from (Belarus) Shakhtyor Soligorsk)
11	MF	BRA	Marcos Guilherme (from (Brazil) São Paulo)
13	FW	RUS	Aleksandr Alkhazov
15	MF	RUS	Vladimir Khubulov (on loan from Krylia Sovetov Samara)
16	MF	GNB	Janio Bikel (from (Canada) Vancouver Whitecaps)
17	DF	URU	Cristian Tassano (from (Portugal) Santa Clara)
18	MF	RUS	David Kobesov (on loan from Pari NN)
21	DF	RUS	Murat Yshyk (from Alania-2 Vladikavkaz)
22	DF	KAZ	Lev Skvortsov (from (Kazakhstan) Turan)
23	DF	SRB	Stefan Melentijević (from (Serbia) Radnički Beograd)
28	MF	RUS	Georgy Karginov
44	DF	RUS	Oleg Dzantiyev (from Ufa)
50	DF	RUS	Vitali Lystsov
66	DF	BRA	Léo Andrade (from (Portugal) Marítimo)
78	MF	RUS	Soslan Kabisov
80	MF	BUL	Lachezar Kotev (from (Bulgaria) Arda Kardzhali)
98	MF	RUS	Samir Masimov

Out: Note: Flags indicate national team as defined under FIFA eligibility rules; some limited exceptions apply. Players may hold more than one non-FIFA nationality.

No.	Pos.	Nation	Player
5	DF	RUS	Aleksei Nikitin (to (Bosnia and Herzegovina) Tuzla City)
6	DF	RUS	Dmitry Tikhy
8	MF	RUS	Denis Glushakov (to Pari NN)
11	FW	RUS	Aleksandr Lomovitsky (end of loan from Rubin Kazan)
15	DF	RUS	Yegor Danilkin (to Volga Ulyanovsk)
17	MF	RUS	Aleksandr Zuyev (to Krylia Sovetov Samara)
21	MF	RUS	Ilya Kamyshev (to Rodina-2 Moscow)
22	GK	RUS	Ilya Lantratov (to Lokomotiv Moscow)
23	DF	BLR	Zakhar Volkov (end of loan from (Belarus) BATE Borisov)
25	DF	RUS	Oleksandr Filin (to (Belgium) Eupen)
44	FW	RUS	Ilya Kukharchuk (to Torpedo Moscow)
80	DF	RUS	Maksim Zhumabekov (on loan to (Belarus) Slavia Mozyr, previously on loan to (Belarus) Vitebsk)
87	MF	RUS	Kirill Bozhenov (end of loan from Rostov)
90	MF	RUS	Daniil Kamlashev (end of loan from Strogino Moscow)
—	MF	RUS	Danila Yanov (on loan to SKA-Khabarovsk, previously on loan to Arsenal Tula)

=== Krasnodar ===
In: Note: Flags indicate national team as defined under FIFA eligibility rules; some limited exceptions apply. Players may hold more than one non-FIFA nationality.

No.	Pos.	Nation	Player
4	DF	PAR	Júnior Alonso (end of loan to (Brazil) Atlético Mineiro)
20	FW	BRA	Kady (from (Azerbaijan) Qarabağ)
58	DF	RUS	Sergey Novikov
90	FW	NGA	Moses Cobnan (from (Slovakia) Železiarne Podbrezová)
97	GK	RUS	Nikita Kokarev (end of loan to Rotor Volgograd)

Out: Note: Flags indicate national team as defined under FIFA eligibility rules; some limited exceptions apply. Players may hold more than one non-FIFA nationality.

No.	Pos.	Nation	Player
15	MF	RUS	Aleks Matsukatov (on loan to Akron Tolyatti)
23	MF	RUS	Vyacheslav Yakimov (on loan to Fakel Voronezh)
44	DF	RUS	Sergei Borodin (on loan to (Israel) Beitar Jerusalem)
59	MF	RUS	Vladislav Yanchenko
63	MF	TJK	Alidzhoni Ayni (on loan to (Tajikistan) Istiklol)
69	FW	RUS	Irakly Manelov (on loan to Arsenal Tula)
92	FW	RUS	Ruslan Apekov (on loan to Akron Tolyatti)
—	FW	BRA	Wanderson (to (Brazil) Internacional, previously on loan)

=== Krylia Sovetov Samara ===
In: Note: Flags indicate national team as defined under FIFA eligibility rules; some limited exceptions apply. Players may hold more than one non-FIFA nationality.

No.	Pos.	Nation	Player
9	FW	RUS	Vladimir Pisarsky (from Orenburg)
15	DF	RUS	Nikolai Rasskazov (from Spartak Moscow)
28	FW	ARG	Benjamín Garré (from (Argentina) Racing)
29	MF	RUS	Aleksandr Zuyev (from Khimki)
57	FW	RUS	Rasil Asaydulin
73	FW	RUS	Vladislav Shitov (from Spartak Moscow, previously on loan)
76	MF	RUS	Ivan Bobyor (from Chertanovo Education Center)
89	DF	RUS	Artur Zagorodnikov

Out: Note: Flags indicate national team as defined under FIFA eligibility rules; some limited exceptions apply. Players may hold more than one non-FIFA nationality.

No.	Pos.	Nation	Player
9	FW	RUS	Sergei Pinyayev (to Lokomotiv Moscow)
13	MF	RUS	Danil Lipovoy (on loan to Volgar Astrakhan)
15	FW	RUS	Maksim Glushenkov (to Lokomotiv Moscow)
17	MF	RUS	Vladimir Khubulov (on loan to Khimki)
18	MF	RUS	Artyom Sokolov (on loan to Pari NN)
44	DF	CRO	Mateo Barać (on loan to (Belgium) Oostende)
77	FW	RUS	Sergey Makarov
—	DF	RUS	Yan Gudkov (on loan to Tekstilshchik Ivanovo, previously on loan to Kuban Krasnodar)
—	DF	RUS	Aleksei Nikitenkov (on loan to Veles Moscow, previously on loan to Zvezda St. Petersburg)
—	DF	BLR	Dmitry Prishchepa (on loan to Rotor Volgograd, previously on loan to Veles Moscow)
—	MF	RUS	Leonid Gerchikov (on loan to Veles Moscow, previously on loan to Zvezda St. Petersburg)
—	MF	RUS	Dmitri Velikorodny (on loan to Novosibirsk, previously on loan to Zvezda St. Petersburg)
—	FW	RUS	Nikita Saltykov (on loan to Akron Tolyatti, previously on loan to Zvezda St. Petersburg)

=== Lokomotiv Moscow ===
In: Note: Flags indicate national team as defined under FIFA eligibility rules; some limited exceptions apply. Players may hold more than one non-FIFA nationality.

No.	Pos.	Nation	Player
7	FW	RUS	Artem Dzyuba (from (Turkey) Adana Demirspor)
8	DF	RUS	Igor Smolnikov (from Torpedo Moscow)
15	FW	RUS	Maksim Glushenkov (from Krylia Sovetov Samara)
17	MF	RUS	Rifat Zhemaletdinov (return from injury)
19	FW	RUS	Sergei Pinyayev (from Krylia Sovetov Samara)
22	GK	RUS	Ilya Lantratov (from Khimki)
30	DF	ARG	Germán Conti (from (Portugal) Benfica)
32	FW	RUS	Artemy Kosogorov (from own academy)
37	FW	RUS	Dmitry Radikovsky (from own academy)
38	MF	RUS	Stanislav Topinka (from Chertanovo Education Center)
51	GK	RUS	Timofey Mitrov (from own academy)
61	DF	RUS	Yevgeny Lukinykh (from own academy)
62	FW	RUS	Roman Kolmakov (from own academy)
63	FW	RUS	Aleksandr Morozov (from own academy)
64	GK	RUS	Vadim Drugov (from own academy)
70	DF	RUS	Maksim Shnaptsev (from own academy)
72	FW	RUS	Aleksey Larin (from own academy)
78	MF	RUS	Mikhail Shakhkalamov
83	MF	RUS	Aleksey Batrakov (from own academy)
84	DF	RUS	Aleksey Lysov (from own academy)
97	MF	RUS	Anton Gorbunov (from own academy)

Out: Note: Flags indicate national team as defined under FIFA eligibility rules; some limited exceptions apply. Players may hold more than one non-FIFA nationality.

No.	Pos.	Nation	Player
7	FW	NED	Gyrano Kerk (on loan to (Belgium) Antwerp)
16	DF	CRO	Tin Jedvaj (on loan to (United Arab Emirates) Al Ain)
18	DF	UKR	Mark Mampassi (on loan to (Turkey) Antalyaspor)
29	FW	BRA	Pedrinho (on loan to (Brazil) São Paulo)
77	FW	MNE	Marko Rakonjac (on loan to (Serbia) Red Star Belgrade)
—	FW	RUS	Nikita Khlynov (on loan to Znamya Noginsk, previously on loan to Forte Taganrog)

=== Orenburg ===
In: Note: Flags indicate national team as defined under FIFA eligibility rules; some limited exceptions apply. Players may hold more than one non-FIFA nationality.

No.	Pos.	Nation	Player
4	DF	RUS	Danila Khotulyov (from Zenit St. Petersburg, previously on loan)
13	FW	RUS	Vladimir Obukhov (doping ban expiry)
22	DF	ARG	Matías Pérez (from (Argentina) Lanús)
37	MF	RUS	Danil Kapustyansky (from own academy)
95	GK	RUS	Andrey Khodanovich (from own academy)

Out: Note: Flags indicate national team as defined under FIFA eligibility rules; some limited exceptions apply. Players may hold more than one non-FIFA nationality.

No.	Pos.	Nation	Player
22	DF	BLR	Aleksandr Pavlovets (on loan to (Greece) PAS Lamia 1964)
47	DF	RUS	Timur Nikolayev (on loan to Forte Taganrog)
69	FW	RUS	Semyon Yurin (on loan to Forte Taganrog)
70	MF	RUS	Batraz Gurtsiyev (on loan to Alania Vladikavkaz)
77	FW	RUS	Vladimir Pisarsky (to Krylia Sovetov Samara)
87	DF	RUS	Dmitry Vasilyev (end of loan from Zenit St. Petersburg)

=== Pari Nizhny Novgorod ===
In: Note: Flags indicate national team as defined under FIFA eligibility rules; some limited exceptions apply. Players may hold more than one non-FIFA nationality.

No.	Pos.	Nation	Player
2	DF	RUS	Viktor Aleksandrov (from Rubin Kazan, previously on loan)
3	DF	CMR	Macky Bagnack (on loan from (Kazakhstan) Kairat)
18	MF	RUS	Artyom Sokolov (on loan from Krylia Sovetov Samara)
20	FW	RUS	Vladislav Yakovlev (on loan from CSKA Moscow)
88	MF	RUS	Denis Glushakov (from Khimki)

Out: Note: Flags indicate national team as defined under FIFA eligibility rules; some limited exceptions apply. Players may hold more than one non-FIFA nationality.

No.	Pos.	Nation	Player
2	DF	RUS	Viktor Aleksandrov (end of loan from Rubin Kazan)
10	FW	ANG	Felício Milson (on loan to (Turkey) Ankaragücü)
17	DF	RUS	Elmir Nabiullin (to Rubin Kazan)
18	MF	RUS	David Kobesov (on loan to Khimki)
23	DF	RUS	Daniil Penchikov (on loan to (Kazakhstan) Aktobe)
29	MF	RUS	Yegor Gaganin (on loan to Rodina-2 Moscow)
41	DF	RUS	Yegor Pigayev (to SKA-Khabarovsk)
57	MF	RUS	Ilya Ruzavin (to Khimik Dzerzhinsk)
63	GK	RUS	Ivan Migunov (to Kolomna)
86	DF	RUS	Ilya Agapov (to CSKA Moscow)
—	MF	RUS	Dmitri Yugaldin (on loan to Irtysh Omsk, previously on loan to Kuban Krasnodar)
—	FW	UZB	Ruslanbek Jiyanov (on loan to (Uzbekistan) Olympic Tashkent, previously from Olympic)

=== Rostov ===
In: Note: Flags indicate national team as defined under FIFA eligibility rules; some limited exceptions apply. Players may hold more than one non-FIFA nationality.

No.	Pos.	Nation	Player
26	FW	MKD	David Toshevski (previously not registered)
53	FW	RUS	Kirill Moiseyev (end of loan to Rubin Kazan)
76	MF	RUS	Danila Sukhomlinov (end of loan to SKA-Khabarovsk)

Out: Note: Flags indicate national team as defined under FIFA eligibility rules; some limited exceptions apply. Players may hold more than one non-FIFA nationality.

No.	Pos.	Nation	Player
24	DF	RUS	Konstantin Kovalyov (on loan to Avangard Kursk)
29	DF	RUS	Aleksandr Mukhin (on loan to Ufa)
32	DF	RUS	Aleksandr Smirnov (to Kuban Krasnodar)
54	DF	RUS	Daniil Yeryomin (to Kaluga)
83	FW	RUS	Maksim Stavtsev (to Zorkiy Krasnogorsk)
89	FW	RUS	Artyom Ntumba (on loan to Veles Moscow)
—	DF	BIH	Dennis Hadžikadunić (on loan to (Spain) Mallorca, previously on loan to (Sweden) Malmö FF)
—	MF	RUS	Kirill Bozhenov (on loan to Dynamo Makhachkala, previously on loan to Khimki)
—	MF	RUS	Kirill Folmer (on loan to Baltika Kaliningrad, previously on loan to Akhmat Grozny)
—	MF	SWE	Armin Gigović (on loan to (Denmark) Midtjylland, previously on loan to (Denmark) OB)

=== Sochi ===
In: Note: Flags indicate national team as defined under FIFA eligibility rules; some limited exceptions apply. Players may hold more than one non-FIFA nationality.

No.	Pos.	Nation	Player
5	MF	CIV	Victorien Angban (return from injury)
24	MF	BRA	Miguel (from (Brazil) Red Bull Bragantino)
54	DF	RUS	Artur Kuskov
68	FW	RUS	Zakhar Fyodorov (from own academy)
69	FW	RUS	Danil Anosov (from Salyut Belgorod)
73	DF	RUS	David Kirakosyan (from Konoplyov football academy)

Out: Note: Flags indicate national team as defined under FIFA eligibility rules; some limited exceptions apply. Players may hold more than one non-FIFA nationality.

No.	Pos.	Nation	Player
14	MF	RUS	Daniil Martovoy (on loan to Rodina Moscow)
23	MF	RUS	Kirill Ushatov (on loan to Yenisey Krasnoyarsk)

=== Spartak Moscow ===
In: Note: Flags indicate national team as defined under FIFA eligibility rules; some limited exceptions apply. Players may hold more than one non-FIFA nationality.

No.	Pos.	Nation	Player
4	DF	PAR	Alexis Duarte (from (Paraguay) Cerro Porteño)
20	DF	POR	Tomás Tavares (from (Portugal) Benfica)
49	MF	RUS	Anton Gurylyov (from own academy)
51	MF	RUS	Artur Maksimchuk (end of loan to Novosibirsk)
75	MF	RUS	Anton Roshchin (from own academy)

Out: Note: Flags indicate national team as defined under FIFA eligibility rules; some limited exceptions apply. Players may hold more than one non-FIFA nationality.

No.	Pos.	Nation	Player
32	DF	SVN	Miha Mevlja
36	FW	RUS	Artyom Sidorenkov (to Kaluga)
42	DF	RUS	Artyom Gutsa (to Tekstilshchik Ivanovo)
54	GK	RUS	Nikolay Smirnov
76	FW	RUS	Vitali Shitov (on loan to Zvezda St. Petersburg)
92	DF	RUS	Nikolai Rasskazov (to Krylia Sovetov Samara)
—	DF	BRA	Ayrton Lucas (to (Brazil) Flamengo, previously on loan)
—	MF	RUS	Fanil Sungatulin (to Ural Yekaterinburg, previously on loan)
—	FW	RUS	Vladislav Shitov (to Krylia Sovetov Samara, previously on loan)

=== Torpedo Moscow ===
In: Note: Flags indicate national team as defined under FIFA eligibility rules; some limited exceptions apply. Players may hold more than one non-FIFA nationality.

No.	Pos.	Nation	Player
5	DF	RUS	Yevgeni Shlyakov (from Fakel Voronezh)
9	FW	RUS	Ilya Stefanovich (from Volgar Astrakhan)
11	FW	RUS	Ilya Kukharchuk (from Khimki)
16	FW	PER	Yordy Reyna (from (United States) Charlotte)
17	FW	BRA	Jajá (on loan from (Brazil) Athletico Paranaense)
21	FW	BRA	André Felipe
23	DF	RUS	Yuri Zhuravlyov (from Akhmat Grozny)
25	DF	BLR	Roman Yuzepchuk (from (Belarus) Shakhtyor Soligorsk)
29	GK	RUS	Anton Porutchikov
92	DF	RUS	Artyom Yevshintsev

Out: Note: Flags indicate national team as defined under FIFA eligibility rules; some limited exceptions apply. Players may hold more than one non-FIFA nationality.

No.	Pos.	Nation	Player
8	MF	RUS	Bogdan Reykhmen (on loan to KAMAZ Naberezhnye Chelny)
14	MF	RUS	Mukhammad Sultonov (to Rodina Moscow)
21	MF	FRA	Damien Le Tallec (to (France) Sochaux)
23	FW	ARM	Artyom Simonyan (to SKA-Khabarovsk)
26	FW	HUN	Márk Koszta (on loan to (Israel) Maccabi Bnei Reineh)
28	DF	RUS	Igor Smolnikov (to Lokomotiv Moscow)
55	FW	BLR	Denis Laptev (to (Belarus) BATE Borisov)

=== Ural Yekaterinburg ===
In: Note: Flags indicate national team as defined under FIFA eligibility rules; some limited exceptions apply. Players may hold more than one non-FIFA nationality.

No.	Pos.	Nation	Player
50	FW	RUS	Artyom Galadzhan
71	FW	RUS	Daniil Arsentyev (end of loan to Volga Ulyanovsk)
75	MF	RUS	Fanil Sungatulin (from Spartak Moscow, previously on loan)
77	GK	RUS	Oleg Baklov (return from injury)
79	FW	RUS	Aleksei Kashtanov (from Rodina Moscow, previously on loan)
96	FW	RUS	Mikhail Ageyev (end of loan to Volgar Astrakhan)

Out: Note: Flags indicate national team as defined under FIFA eligibility rules; some limited exceptions apply. Players may hold more than one non-FIFA nationality.

No.	Pos.	Nation	Player
55	MF	RUS	Artyom Shabolin (to Novosibirsk)
65	MF	RUS	Aleksandr Galimov (to Shinnik Yaroslavl)
70	FW	RUS	Ramazan Gadzhimuradov (on loan to Dynamo Makhachkala)
77	MF	UZB	Oston Urunov (to (Uzbekistan) Navbahor Namangan)
88	FW	RUS	Artyom Shmykov (on loan to Irtysh Omsk, previously on loan to Kuban Krasnodar)
90	MF	RUS	Aleksandr Shcherbakov (to Sokol Saratov)
93	DF	RUS	Aleksey Gerasimov (on loan to KAMAZ Naberezhnye Chelny)
—	DF	RUS	Nikita Chistyakov (on loan to Novosibirsk, previously on loan to Tyumen)

=== Zenit Saint Petersburg ===
In: Note: Flags indicate national team as defined under FIFA eligibility rules; some limited exceptions apply. Players may hold more than one non-FIFA nationality.

No.	Pos.	Nation	Player
1	GK	RUS	Aleksandr Vasyutin (end of loan to (Sweden) Djurgården)
28	DF	KAZ	Nuraly Alip (from (Kazakhstan) Kairat, previously on loan)
53	DF	RUS	Matvey Bardachyov (from own academy)
65	DF	RUS	Vitaly Frantsuzov (from own academy)
77	DF	BRA	Robert Renan (from (Brazil) Corinthians)
79	MF	RUS	Dmitry Vasilyev (end of loan to Orenburg)

Out: Note: Flags indicate national team as defined under FIFA eligibility rules; some limited exceptions apply. Players may hold more than one non-FIFA nationality.

No.	Pos.	Nation	Player
1	GK	BRA	Ivan (end of loan from (Brazil) Corinthians)
6	DF	CRO	Dejan Lovren (to (France) Lyon)
45	MF	RUS	Dmitry Sergeyev (to (Kazakhstan) Kairat)
56	DF	ARM	Sergey Muradyan (to (Armenia) Noah)
65	DF	RUS	Yevgeny Panteleychuk
80	DF	RUS	Ilya Skrobotov
81	DF	RUS	Yury Koledin (to Zvezda St. Petersburg)
—	DF	RUS	Danila Khotulyov (to Orenburg, previously on loan)
—	FW	BRA	Yuri Alberto (to (Brazil) Corinthians, previously on loan)
