= 2021–22 FC Khimki season =

Khimki
2021–22 season
- Owner: Khimki
- General director: Sergei Anokhin
- Head coach: Igor Cherevchenko
- Stadium: Arena Khimki
- Premier League: 13th
- Relegation play-offs: Winners vs SKA-Khabarovsk
- Russian Cup: Last 32
- Top goalscorer: League: Denis Glushakov (10); All: Denis Glushakov (11)
- Highest home attendance: 5,520 vs CSKA Moscow (9 April 2022)
- Lowest home attendance: 0 vs Ural Yekaterinburg (31 October 2021)
- Average home league attendance: 1,525 (21 May 2022)
Home colours	Away colours
- All statistics correct as of 26 February 2022.

The 2021–22 season was the 64th season in the existence of FC Khimki and the club's 19th consecutive season in the top flight of Russian football. In addition to the domestic league, FC Khimki are participating in this season's editions of the Russian Cup.

== Season events ==
On 19 March, Filip Dagerstål, Didier Lamkel Zé and Bruno Viana all suspended their contracts with Khimki.

== Players ==
As of 19 March 2022

Note: Flags indicate national team as defined under FIFA eligibility rules; some limited exceptions apply. Players may hold more than one non-FIFA nationality.

No.	Pos.	Nation	Player
1	GK	RUS	Yegor Generalov
4	DF	NGR	Brian Idowu
6	DF	RUS	Dmitry Tikhy
7	FW	RUS	Ilya Sadygov
8	MF	RUS	Denis Glushakov
10	FW	RUS	Aleksandr Dolgov
11	DF	RUS	Elmir Nabiullin
14	MF	SWE	Besard Šabović
15	DF	RUS	Yegor Danilkin
17	MF	RUS	Pavel Mamayev
18	DF	RUS	Yuri Zhirkov
19	FW	RUS	Aleksandr Rudenko
20	MF	SRB	Nemanja Glavčić

No.	Pos.	Nation	Player
21	MF	RUS	Ilya Kamyshev
22	GK	RUS	Ilya Lantratov
23	DF	BLR	Zakhar Volkov (on loan from BATE Borisov)
24	MF	NGR	Lawrence Nicholas
25	DF	RUS	Oleksandr Filin
26	MF	RUS	Artyom Yuran
27	MF	ARM	David Davidyan
44	FW	RUS	Ilya Kukharchuk
70	MF	RUS	Butta Magomedov
77	MF	RUS	Reziuan Mirzov (on loan from Spartak Moscow)
80	FW	RUS	Maksim Zhumabekov
87	DF	RUS	Kirill Bozhenov (on loan from Rostov)
88	DF	GEO	Gia Grigalava

=== Contract suspensions ===
Note: Flags indicate national team as defined under FIFA eligibility rules; some limited exceptions apply. Players may hold more than one non-FIFA nationality.

No.	Pos.	Nation	Player
3	DF	SWE	Filip Dagerstål (at IFK Norrköping)
9	FW	CMR	Didier Lamkel Zé (on loan from Royal Antwerp)

No.	Pos.	Nation	Player
30	DF	BRA	Bruno Viana (on loan from Braga)

=== Out on loan ===
Note: Flags indicate national team as defined under FIFA eligibility rules; some limited exceptions apply. Players may hold more than one non-FIFA nationality.

No.	Pos.	Nation	Player
—	GK	RUS	Vitali Sychyov (at Olimp-Dolgoprudny)
—	DF	RUS	Kirill Bolshakov (at Kuban Krasnodar)
—	MF	RUS	Nikita Balakhontsev (at Olimp-Dolgoprudny)

No.	Pos.	Nation	Player
—	FW	SUI	Kemal Ademi (at Paderborn)
—	FW	ARM	Arshak Koryan (at Orenburg)

== Pre-season and friendlies ==
Win Draw Loss Fixtures

14 July 2021 Friendly	Khimki (Russia)	2–3	(Russia) Sochi	Khimki, Russia
15:00 MSK (UTC+3)				Stadium: Arena Khimki

18 July 2021 Friendly	Spartak Moscow (Russia)	5–1	(Russia) Khimki	Moscow, Russia
20:00 MSK (UTC+3)	Gigot 10'; Sobolev 21'; Larsson 29'; Kutepov 66'; Melkadze 75'	Report	Danilkin 90'	Stadium: Otkrytiye Arena

== Competitions ==
=== Overview ===
Competition	First match	Last match	Starting round	Final position	Record							
Competition	First match	Last match	Starting round	Final position	Pld	W	D	L	GF	GA	GD	Win %
Premier League	24 July 2021	21 May 2022	Matchday 1	13th	30	7	11	12	34	47	−13	23.33
Relegation play-offs	25 May 2022	28 May 2022	1st leg	Winners	2	1	0	1	3	1	+2	50.00
Russian Cup	22 September 2021	27 October 2021	Group stage	Group stage	2	0	2	0	1	1	+0	0.00
Total					34	8	13	13	38	49	−11	23.53

Last updated: 28 May 2022
Source: Soccerway

=== Premier League ===
==== League table ====
Pos	Team	Pld	W	D	L	GF	GA	GD	Pts	Qualification or relegation
11	Nizhny Novgorod	30	8	9	13	26	39	−13	33 (Note: Head-to-head points: Nizhny Novgorod 4, Ural Yekaterinburg 1.)	
12	Ural Yekaterinburg	30	8	9	13	27	35	−8	33	
13	Khimki (O)	30	7	11	12	34	47	−13	32	Qualification for the relegation play-offs
14	Ufa (R)	30	6	12	12	29	40	−11	30	Qualification for the relegation play-offs
15	Rubin Kazan (R)	30	8	5	17	34	56	−22	29	Relegation to First League

Source: Premier Liga
Rules for classification: 1) Points; 2) Head-to-head points; 3) Head-to-head matches won; 4) Head-to-head goal difference; 5) Head-to-head goals scored; 6) Matches won; 7) Goal difference; 8) Goals scored; 9) 2020–21 position (not applicable to final standings); 10) Play-off.
(O) Play-off winners; (R) Relegated

==== Results summary ====
Overall								Home						Away					
Pld	W	D	L	GF	GA	GD	Pts	W	D	L	GF	GA	GD	W	D	L	GF	GA	GD
30	7	11	12	34	47	−13	32	4	8	3	21	19	+2	3	3	9	13	28	−15

Last updated: 21 May 2022.
Source: Soccerway

==== Results by round ====
Round	1	2	3	4	5	6	7	8	9	10	11	12	13	14	15	16	17	18	19	20	21	22	23	24	25	26	27	28	29	30
Ground	H	A	H	A	H	A	A	A	H	A	H	A	Н	A	А	Н	Н	A	H	A	H	A	A	H	A	H	H	A	A	H
Result	L	W	D	L	D	D	L	L	D	D	W	L	D	L	D	D	L	L	L	L	D	W	W	W	D	W	D	L	L	W
Position	14	7	7	12	12	12	13	15	14	16	13	14	15	15	15	15	16	16	16	16	16	16	14	13	13	13	12	12	13	13

Updated to match(es) played on 21 May 2022. Source: Premier Liga
A = Away; H = Home; W = Win; D = Draw; L = Loss

==== Matches ====
24 July 2021 1	Khimki	1 – 3	Zenit St.Petersburg	Khimki
17:30 MSK (UTC+3)	Kukharchuk 28'	Report	Ozdoyev (yellow card) 4'; Azmoun 33'; Yerokhin 71'; Sutormin 76' (pen.)	Stadium: Arena Khimki; Attendance: 650; Referee: Evgeny Kukulyak^{ru}

1 August 2021 2	Krasnodar	0 – 1	Khimki	Krasnodar
20:00 MSK (UTC+3)	Claesson (penalty missed) 15'; Petrov (yellow card) 55'; Córdoba (yellow card) 82'; Chernikov (yellow card) 88'; Vilhena (yellow card) 90+2'; Cabella (yellow card) 90+'	Report	Stojinović (yellow card) 14'; Tikhy (yellow card) 60'; Kukharchuk 63' (yellow card) 80'; Kamyshev (yellow card) 90+'; Dagerstål (yellow card) 90+'	Stadium: Krasnodar Stadium; Attendance: 500; Referee: Artyom Lyubimov

8 August 2021 3	Khimki	1 – 1	Rostov	Khimki
17:30 MSK (UTC+3)	Komlichenko 14'; Poloz (yellow card) 33'; Mamayev (yellow card) 37'; Bayramyan (yellow card) 69'	Report	Sebai (yellow card) 22'; Stojinović (yellow card) 35'; Glushakov 70' (pen.); Tikhy (yellow card) 90'	Stadium: Arena Khimki; Attendance: 555; Referee: Pavel Shadykhanov

16 August 2021 4	Sochi	3 – 0	Khimki	Sochi
19:00 MSK (UTC+3)	Barsov 17'; Popov 54', 75'	Report	Šabović (yellow card) 79'	Stadium: Fisht Olympic Stadium; Attendance: 491; Referee: Vladislav Bezborodov

22 August 2021 5	Khimki	1 – 1	Rubin Kazan	Khimki
20:00 MSK (UTC+3)	Glushakov 16'; Sebai (yellow card) 84'; Tikhy (yellow card) 90+1'	Report	Jevtić 30'; Zotov (yellow card) 33'; Uremović (yellow card) 77'	Stadium: Arena Khimki; Attendance: 620; Referee: Vasily Kazartsev

27 August 2021 6	Khimki	1 – 1	Nizhny Novgorod	Khimki
18:30 MSK (UTC+3)	Dagerstål (yellow card) 40'; Glushakov (yellow card) 45' (goal) 54' (pen.); Kamyshev (red card) 88'	Report	Kozlov 35'; Tkachuk (yellow card) 76'; Masoero (yellow card) 80'	Stadium: Arena Khimki; Attendance: 510; Referee: Vladimir Moskalyov

11 September 2021 7	Spartak Moscow	3 – 1	Khimki	Moscow
19:00 MSK (UTC+3)	Dzhikiya (yellow card) 8'; Ayrton 25'; Sobolev (yellow card) 41'; Promes 48'; Umayrov (yellow card) 61'; Ponce 68'; Gigot (yellow card) 81'; Caufriez (yellow card) 88'	Report	Troshechkin (yellow card) 44'; Sokolov (yellow card) 62'; Glushakov (yellow card) 89'	Stadium: Otkritie Arena; Attendance: 2,968; Referee: Sergey Ivanov

18 September 2021 8	Ufa	3 – 2	Khimki	Ufa
15:00 MSK (UTC+3)	Agalarov 52', 82' (yellow card) 90+2'; Kamilov 62'; Saplinov (yellow card) 81'	Report	Troshechkin (yellow card) 9'; Glushakov 44', 90+1' (pen.)	Stadium: BetBoom Arena; Attendance: 493; Referee: Pavel Kukuyan

25 September 2021 9	Khimki	0 – 0	Lokomotiv Moscow	Khimki
14:00 MSK (UTC+3)	Ademi (yellow card) 33'; Sokolov (yellow card) 65'; Glushakov (yellow card) 90+3'	Report	Barinov (yellow card) 25'; Marinato (red card) 53'	Stadium: Arena Khimki; Attendance: 1,600; Referee: Aleksey Vladimirovich

2 October 2021 10	Arsenal Tula	0 – 0	Khimki	Tula
19:00 MSK (UTC+3)	K.Kangwa (yellow card) 38'; Novoseltsev (yellow card) 73'; Davitashvili (yellow card) 90+1'	Report	Filin (yellow card) 17'; Tikhy (yellow card) 29'; Bozhenov (yellow card) 59'	Stadium: Arsenal Stadium; Attendance: 2,868; Referee: Vladislav Bezborodov

17 October 2021 11	Khimki	2 – 0	Akhmat Grozny	Khimki
16:30 MSK (UTC+3)	Kukharchuk (yellow card) 2' (goal) 12'; Mirzov (yellow card) 63'; Dolgov 90'	Report	Konovalov (yellow card) 35'; Bystrov (yellow card) 68'; Semyonov (yellow card) 71'; Nižić (yellow card) 90+'	Stadium: Arena Khimki; Attendance: 480; Referee: Pavel Shadykhanov

22 October 2021 12	Dynamo Moscow	4 – 1	Khimki	Moscow
19:00 MSK (UTC+3)	Moro 12'; Grulyov 26', 60'; Tyukavin 52'	Report	Kamyshev (yellow card) 8'; Ademi 90'	Stadium: VTB Arena; Attendance: 6,247; Referee: Ivan Sidekov

31 October 2021 13	Khimki	0 – 0	Ural Yekaterinburg	Khimki
19:00 MSK (UTC+3)	Karpov (yellow card) 84'; Dagerstål (yellow card) 87'; Bozhenov (yellow card) 90+3'	Report	Mamin (yellow card) 58'; Jovičić (yellow card) 74'	Stadium: Arena Khimki; Attendance: 0 Referee: Pavel Kukuyan

6 November 2021 14	Krylia Sovetov	3 – 0	Khimki	Samara
16:30 MSK (UTC+3)	Vityugov (yellow card) 4'; Sarveli 20'; Sergeyev 39' (pen.); Gorshkov (yellow card) 67'; Yezhov 71'; Zeffane (yellow card) 87'	Report	Idowu (yellow card) 29'; Karpov (yellow card) 39'; Danilkin (yellow card) 45+1'; Filin (yellow card) 71'	Stadium: Solidarnost Arena; Attendance: 498; Referee: Artyom Lyubimov

21 November 2021 15	CSKA Moscow	0 – 0	Khimki	Moscow
14:00 MSK (UTC+3)	Dzagoev (yellow card) 8'; Fuchs (red card) 15'; Fernandes (yellow card) 57'	Report	Ademi (penalty missed) 17'; Dagerstål (yellow card) 38'; Mirzov (yellow card) 42'; Nabiullin (yellow card) 51'; Bozhenov (yellow card) 54'; Šabović (yellow card) 80'; Tikhy (yellow card) 90+'	Stadium: VEB Arena; Attendance: 4,240; Referee: Vladislav Bezborodov

27 November 2021 16	Khimki	3 – 3	Krasnodar	Khimki
19:00 MSK (UTC+3)	Nabiullin 54'; Glushakov 56'; Filin (yellow card) 59'; Dolgov 71'	Report	Claesson 16'; Krychowiak (penalty missed) 36'; Cabella 67'; Ilyin 80'; Chernikov (yellow card) 90+'	Stadium: Arena Khimki; Attendance: 704; Referee: Pavel Shadykhanov

5 December 2021 17	Khimki	1 – 2	Arsenal Tula	Khimki
14:00 MSK (UTC+3)	Glushakov (yellow card) 27'; Idowu (yellow card) 32' (yellow-red card) 90'; Mirzov 36' (pen.); Nabiullin (yellow card) 85'	Report	K.Kangwa (yellow card) 22'; Davitashvili 61'; Čaušić (yellow card) 83'; E.Kangwa 87'	Stadium: Arena Khimki; Attendance: 761; Referee: Kukulyak Lazarevich

12 December 2021 18	Akhmat Grozny	4 – 1	Khimki	Grozny
16:30 MSK (UTC+3)	Timofeyev 19' (pen.), 45+' (pen.); Konaté 50' (pen.), 65'	Report	Kukharchuk (yellow card) 12'; Bozhenov (yellow card) 49'; Troshechkin 66'	Stadium: Akhmat-Arena; Attendance: 4,618; Referee: Alexey Amelin

26 February 2022 19	Khimki	0 – 3	Dynamo Moscow	Khimki
14:00 MSK (UTC+3)	Dagerstål (red card) 45'; Mirzov (yellow card) 54'; Nicholas (red card) 67'	Report	Smolov 35'; Yevgenyev (yellow card) 38' (yellow-red card) 52'; Szymański 85'; Fomin 89'	Stadium: Arena Khimki; Attendance: 2,198; Referee: Kirill Levnikov

6 March 2022 20	Lokomotiv Moscow	3 – 2	Khimki	Moscow
14:00 MSK (UTC+3)	Kerk 8'; Maradishvili (yellow card) 18'; Maradishvili (yellow card) 18'; Isidor 21' (yellow card) 48'; Kuchta 80'; Zhemaletdinov (penalty missed) 90+3'	Report	Lamkel Zé 6', 72' (yellow card) 81'; Viana (yellow card) 15' (yellow-red card) 42'; Zhirkov (yellow card) 29'; Bozhenov (yellow card) 35'; Volkov (yellow card) 84'	Stadium: RZD Arena; Attendance: 3,118; Referee: Artyom Lyubimov

13 March 2022 21	Khimki	0 – 0	Sochi	Khimki
14:00 MSK (UTC+3)	Lamkel Zé (yellow card) 9'; Mirzov (yellow card) 20'; Glavčić (yellow card) 60'; Bozhenov (yellow card) 62'; Šabović (yellow card) 64'; Rudenko (yellow card) 90+'	Report	Drkušić (yellow card) 48'; Yusupov (yellow card) 56' (penalty missed) 63'	Stadium: Arena Khimki; Attendance: 503; Referee: Aleksei Matyunin

19 March 2022 22	Ural Yekaterinburg	0 – 1	Khimki	Yekaterinburg
16:30 MSK (UTC+3)	Gerasimov (yellow card) 46'	Report	Kamyshev (yellow card) 60'; Mirzov (yellow card) 81'; Kuzmichyov 86' (o.g.)	Stadium: Central Stadium; Attendance: 5,273; Referee: Vladimir Moskalyov

1 April 2022 23	Rubin Kazan	2 – 3	Khimki	Kazan
19:00 MSK (UTC+3)	Zuyev (yellow card) 53'; Onugkha 56'; Samoshnikov (yellow card) 79'; Tikhy 84' (o.g.)	Report	Glushakov 60'; Kukharchuk 62'; Bozhenov (yellow card) 77'; Lantratov (yellow card) 82'; Volkov 90'; Magomedov (yellow card) 90+'	Stadium: Ak Bars Arena; Attendance: 4,284; Referee: Vladislav Bezborodov

9 April 2022 24	Khimki	4 – 2	CSKA Moscow	Khimki
14:00 MSK (UTC+3)	Sadygov 9'; Rudenko (yellow card) 20' (goal) 54', 86'; Grigalava (yellow card) 42'; Šabović 80'	Report	Ushakov 32'; Yazıcı 44' (pen.); Carrascal (yellow card) 68'	Stadium: Arena Khimki; Attendance: 5,520; Referee: Pavel Kukuyan

17 April 2022 25	Nizhny Novgorod	0 – 0	Khimki	Nizhny Novgorod
19:00 MSK (UTC+3)	Suleymanov (yellow card) 35'; Stotsky (yellow card) 80'; Kecskés (yellow card) 85'	Report		Stadium: Nizhny Novgorod Stadium; Attendance: 5,977; Referee: Artyom Chistyakov

24 April 2022 26	Khimki	4 – 1	Krylia Sovetov	Khimki
14:00 MSK (UTC+3)	Nabiullin (yellow card) 27'; Glushakov 45+' (pen.); Mirzov 50'; Sadygov 87'; Soldatenkov 90' (o.g.)	Report	Glushenkov 28'; Yakuba (yellow card) 42' (yellow-red card) 45'; Soldatenkov (yellow card) 58'; Bijl (red card) 61'	Stadium: Arena Khimki; Attendance: 1,601; Referee: Aleksei Matyunin

1 May 2022 27	Khimki	1 – 1	Ufa	Khimki
16:30 MSK (UTC+3)	Šabović (yellow card) 7'; Nabiullin (red card) 12'; Kukharchuk 31'; Idowu (yellow card) 49'; Bozhenov (yellow card) 79'; Filin (yellow card) 90+'	Report	Ortiz (yellow card) 54'; Agalarov 90+' (pen.) (yellow card) FT; Urunov (yellow card) 90+'	Stadium: Arena Khimki; Attendance: 2,580; Referee: Kirill Levnikov

7 May 2022 28	Zenit St.Petersburg	1 – 0	Khimki	Saint Petersburg
16:30 MSK (UTC+3)	Sergeyev 14'; Adamov (yellow card) 90+'	Report		Stadium: Krestovsky Stadium; Attendance: 40,068; Referee: Alexey Amelin

14 May 2022 29	Rostov	2 – 1	Khimki	Rostov-on-Don
16:30 MSK (UTC+3)	Tugarev 12'; Poloz 17'; Shchetinin (yellow card) 30'; Bayramyan (yellow card) 32'; Kalinin (yellow card) 43'; Langovich (yellow card) 49'	Report	Bozhenov (yellow card) 20'; Idowu (yellow card) 23'; Mirzov 90+'; Grigalava (yellow card) 90+'	Stadium: Rostov Arena; Attendance: 15,825; Referee: Vladislav Bezborodov

21 May 2022 30	Khimki	2 – 1	Spartak Moscow	Khimki
17:00 MSK (UTC+3)	Glushakov 39' (pen.); Bozhenov 44'; Lantratov (yellow card) 87'	Report	Gigot 11'	Stadium: Arena Khimki; Attendance: 4,597; Referee: Sergei Karasev

==== Relegation play-offs ====
25 May 2020 1st Leg	SKA-Khabarovsk	1 – 0	Khimki	Khabarovsk
12:30 MSK (UTC+3)	Emmerson 14'; Manuylov (yellow card) 42'; Gongadze (yellow card) 65'; Fomin (yellow card) 84'; Sugrobov (yellow card) 90+'	Report	Glavčić (yellow card) 41'; Grigalava (yellow card) 72'; Dolgov (yellow card) 74'	Stadium: Lenin Stadium; Referee: Vladimir Moskalyov

28 May 2022 2nd Leg	Khimki	3 – 0 (3 – 1 agg.)	SKA-Khabarovsk	Khimki
14:00 MSK (UTC+3)	Glushakov 8' (pen.); Rudenko (yellow card) 11'; Bozhenov (yellow card) 37'; Mirzov 45+2' (penalty missed) 87'; Dolgov 50'; Kukharchuk (yellow card) 90+'	Report	Gashchenkov (yellow card) 7'; Kvekveskiri (yellow card) 38'; Gongadze (yellow card) 90+'	Stadium: Arena Khimki; Referee: Sergey Ivanov

=== Russian Cup ===
==== Round of 32 ====
Pos	Team	Pld	W	D	L	GF	GA	GD	Pts	Qualification
1	Baltika (Q)	2	1	1	0	2	1	+1	4	Advance to Play-off
2	Khimki	2	0	2	0	1	1	0	2	
3	Saransk	2	0	1	1	2	3	−1	1	

Rules for classification: 1) Points; 2) Wins; 3) Goal differential; 4) Goals scored; 5) Head-to-head result; 6) Disciplinary points.
(Q) Qualified for the phase indicated

22 September 2021 Group stage	Saransk	1–1 (7–6 p)	Khimki	Saransk
16:00 MSK (UTC+3)	Yusupov 62'	Report	Dolgov 11'	Stadium: Mordovia Arena; Referee: Daniil Shemetov
	Penalties
	Pustozyorov (penalty scored); Arkhipov (penalty missed); Tenyayev (penalty scored); Sobolev (penalty scored); Abramov (penalty scored); Simanov (penalty scored); Yusupov (penalty scored); Shebanov (penalty scored)		(penalty scored) Karpov; (penalty scored) Sokolov; (penalty missed) Šabović; (penalty scored) Idowu; (penalty scored) Mirzov; (penalty scored) Danilkin; (penalty scored) Troshechkin; (penalty missed) Dolgov

27 October 2021 Group stage	Baltika	0–0 (4–5 p)	Khimki	Kaliningrad
14:00 MSK (UTC+3)		Report		Stadium: Kaliningrad Stadium; Referee: Roman Safyan
	Penalties
	Murtazayev (penalty scored); Marković (penalty missed); Popov (penalty scored); Alshin (penalty scored); Dzhamilov (penalty scored); Meshchaninov (penalty missed)		(penalty missed) Glushakov; (penalty scored) Ademi; (penalty scored) Sadygov; (penalty scored) Filin; (penalty scored) Sokolov; (penalty scored) Karpov

== Squad statistics ==
As of match played 28 May 2022

=== Appearances and goals ===
No.	Pos	Nat	Player	Total		Premier League		Relegation play-offs		Russian Cup	
No.	Pos	Nat	Player	Apps	Goals	Apps	Goals	Apps	Goals	Apps	Goals
4	DF	(Nigeria) NGR	Brian Idowu	28	0	24+1	0	2	0	0+1	0
6	MF	(Russia) RUS	Dmitry Tikhy	22	0	20	0	2	0	0	0
7	FW	(Russia) RUS	Ilya Sadygov	12	2	2+7	2	0+1	0	2	0
8	MF	(Russia) RUS	Denis Glushakov	31	11	26+1	10	2	1	2	0
10	FW	(Russia) RUS	Aleksandr Dolgov	17	4	1+12	2	0+2	1	2	1
11	DF	(Russia) RUS	Elmir Nabiullin	21	1	16+4	1	0	0	1	0
14	MF	(Sweden) SWE	Besard Šabović	23	1	9+12	1	0	0	2	0
15	DF	(Russia) RUS	Yegor Danilkin	16	0	12+3	0	0	0	0+1	0
17	MF	(Russia) RUS	Pavel Mamayev	1	0	1	0	0	0	0	0
18	DF	(Russia) RUS	Yuri Zhirkov	3	0	2+1	0	0	0	0	0
19	FW	(Russia) RUS	Aleksandr Rudenko	12	2	9+2	2	1	0	0	0
20	MF	(Serbia) SRB	Nemanja Glavčić	14	0	5+7	0	1+1	0	0	0
21	MF	(Russia) RUS	Ilya Kamyshev	14	0	8+5	0	0	0	1	0
22	GK	(Russia) RUS	Ilya Lantratov	33	0	30	0	2	0	1	0
23	DF	(Belarus) BLR	Zakhar Volkov	14	1	12	1	2	0	0	0
24	MF	(Nigeria) NGR	Lawrence Nicholas	4	0	1+3	0	0	0	0	0
25	DF	(Russia) RUS	Oleksandr Filin	23	0	16+3	0	2	0	2	0
26	MF	(Russia) RUS	Artyom Yuran	2	0	0+2	0	0	0	0	0
27	MF	(Armenia) ARM	David Davidyan	6	0	0+5	0	0	0	1	0
37	MF	(Russia) RUS	Dmitry Malykhin	1	0	0	0	0+1	0	0	0
44	MF	(Russia) RUS	Ilya Kukharchuk	31	5	25+4	5	2	0	0	0
70	MF	(Russia) RUS	Butta Magomedov	13	0	3+8	0	2	0	0	0
77	FW	(Russia) RUS	Reziuan Mirzov	21	4	17+2	3	1	1	0+1	0
80	FW	(Russia) RUS	Maksim Zhumabekov	3	0	0+2	0	0+1	0	0	0
87	DF	(Russia) RUS	Kirill Bozhenov	25	1	20+1	1	2	0	1+1	0
88	DF	(Georgia (country)) GEO	Gia Grigalava	10	0	7+2	0	1	0	0	0
Players who suspended their contracts:
3	DF	(Sweden) SWE	Filip Dagerstål	17	0	17	0	0	0	0	0
9	FW	(Cameroon) CMR	Didier Lamkel Zé	3	2	3	2	0	0	0	0
30	DF	(Brazil) BRA	Bruno Viana	2	0	2	0	0	0	0	0
Players away from the club on loan:
9	FW	(Switzerland) SUI	Kemal Ademi	13	1	9+3	1	0	0	0+1	0
17	FW	(Armenia) ARM	Arshak Koryan	1	0	0+1	0	0	00	0	
35	GK	(Russia) RUS	Vitali Sychyov	1	0	0	0	0	0	1	0
Players who left Khimki during the season:
2	DF	(Russia) RUS	Maksim Karpov	7	0	5	0	0	0	2	0
5	MF	(Russia) RUS	Aleksandr Troshechkin	17	1	8+7	1	0	0	1+1	0
18	MF	(Russia) RUS	Artyom Sokolov	14	0	4+8	0	0	0	1+1	0
19	FW	(Ivory Coast) CIV	Senin Sebai	6	0	5+1	0	0	0	0	0
33	DF	(Slovenia) SLO	Dušan Stojinović	16	0	11+3	0	0	0	2	0

=== Goal scorers ===
Place	Position	Nation	Number	Name	Premier League	Relegation play-offs	Russian Cup	Total
1	MF	(Russia)	8	Denis Glushakov	10	1	0	11
2	MF	(Russia)	44	Ilya Kukharchuk	5	0	0	5
3	FW	(Russia)	77	Reziuan Mirzov	3	1	0	4
3	FW	(Russia)	10	Aleksandr Dolgov	2	1	1	4
5	FW	(Cameroon)	9	Didier Lamkel Zé	2	0	0	2
5	FW	(Russia)	19	Aleksandr Rudenko	2	0	0	2
5	FW	(Russia)	7	Ilya Sadygov	2	0	0	2
5				Own goal	2	0	0	2
9	DF	(Russia)	11	Elmir Nabiullin	1	0	0	1
9	FW	(Switzerland)	9	Kemal Ademi	1	0	0	1
9	MF	(Russia)	5	Aleksandr Troshechkin	1	0	0	1
9	DF	(Belarus)	23	Zakhar Volkov	1	0	0	1
9	MF	(Sweden)	14	Besard Šabović	1	0	0	1
9	DF	(Russia)	87	Kirill Bozhenov	1	0	1	
				TOTALS	34	3	1	38

=== Clean sheets ===
Place	Position	Nation	Number	Name	Premier League	Relegation play-offs	Russian Cup	Total
1	GK	(Russia)	22	Ilya Lantratov	8	1	1	10
				TOTALS	8	1	1	10

=== Disciplinary record ===
Number	Nation	Position	Name	Premier League		Relegation play-offs		Russian Cup		Total	
Number	Nation	Position	Name	Yellow card	Red card	Yellow card	Red card	Yellow card	Red card	Yellow card	Red card
3	(Sweden)	DF	Filip Dagerstål	4	1	0	0	0	0	4	1
4	(Nigeria)	DF	Brian Idowu	5	1	0	0	0	0	5	1
6	(Russia)	DF	Dmitry Tikhy	5	0	0	0	0	0	5	0
8	(Russia)	MF	Denis Glushakov	3	0	0	0	1	0	4	0
9	(Cameroon)	FW	Didier Lamkel Zé	2	0	0	0	0	0	2	0
10	(Russia)	FW	Aleksandr Dolgov	0	0	1	0	1	0	2	0
11	(Russia)	DF	Elmir Nabiullin	3	1	0	0	0	0	3	1
14	(Sweden)	MF	Besard Šabović	4	0	0	0	0	0	4	0
15	(Russia)	DF	Yegor Danilkin	1	0	0	0	0	0	1	0
18	(Russia)	DF	Yuri Zhirkov	1	0	0	0	0	0	1	0
19	(Russia)	FW	Aleksandr Rudenko	2	0	1	0	0	0	3	0
20	(Serbia)	MF	Nemanja Glavčić	1	0	1	0	0	0	2	0
21	(Russia)	MF	Ilya Kamyshev	3	1	0	0	0	0	3	1
22	(Russia)	GK	Ilya Lantratov	2	0	0	0	0	0	2	0
23	(Belarus)	DF	Zakhar Volkov	1	0	0	0	0	0	1	0
24	(Nigeria)	MF	Lawrence Nicholas	0	1	0	0	0	0	0	1
25	(Russia)	DF	Oleksandr Filin	4	0	0	0	0	0	4	0
27	(Armenia)	MF	David Davidyan	0	0	0	0	1	0	1	0
30	(Brazil)	DF	Bruno Viana	2	1	0	0	0	0	2	1
44	(Russia)	MF	Ilya Kukharchuk	3	0	1	0	0	0	4	0
70	(Russia)	MF	Butta Magomedov	1	0	0	0	0	0	1	0
77	(Russia)	FW	Reziuan Mirzov	5	0	0	0	0	0	5	0
87	(Russia)	DF	Kirill Bozhenov	8	0	1	0	0	0	9	0
88	(Georgia (country))	DF	Gia Grigalava	2	0	1	0	0	0	3	0
Players away on loan:
9	(Switzerland)	FW	Kemal Ademi	1	0	0	0	0	0	1	0
Players who left Khimki during the season:
2	(Russia)	DF	Maksim Karpov	2	0	0	0	0	0	2	0
5	(Russia)	MF	Aleksandr Troshechkin	2	0	0	0	0	0	2	0
18	(Russia)	MF	Artyom Sokolov	2	0	0	0	1	0	3	0
19	(Ivory Coast)	FW	Senin Sebai	2	0	0	0	0	0	2	0
33	(Slovenia)	DF	Dušan Stojinović	2	0	0	0	1	0	3	0
			TOTALS	74	6	6	0	5	0	85	6
