= Ilya Sadygov =

Russian footballer

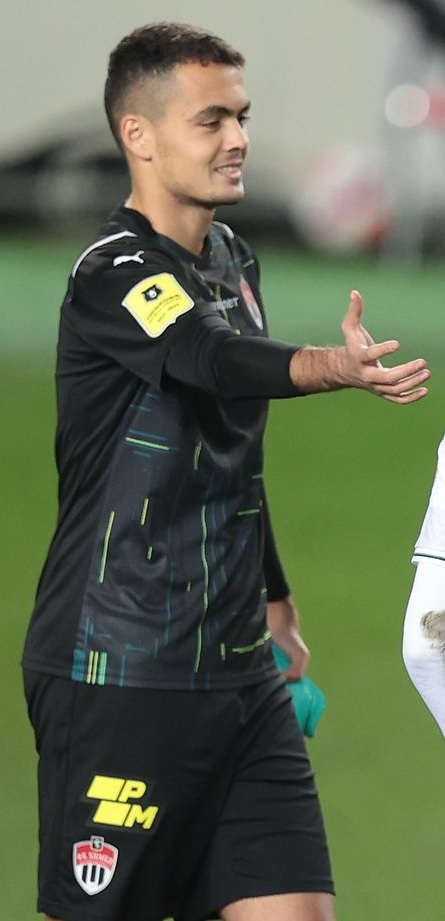
- Sadygov with Khimki in 2021

Personal information
- Full name: Ilya Tufanovich Sadygov
- Date of birth: 29 September 2000 (age 26)
- Place of birth: Khimki, Russia
- Height: 1.92 m (6 ft 4 in)
- Position: Forward

Team information
- Current team: Serikspor
- Number: 9

Senior career*
| Years | Team | Apps | (Gls) |
| 2018–2019 | Olimp Khimki (amateur) | | |
| 2019–2020 | Olimp Khimki | 16 | (2) |
| 2020–2021 | Olimp-Dolgoprudny | 23 | (4) |
| 2021–2025 | Khimki | 61 | (3) |
| 2025– | Serikspor | 28 | (1) |
- * Club domestic league appearances and goals as of 7 May 2026

Ilya Tufanovich Sadygov (Russian: Илья Туфанович Садыгов; Azerbaijani: İlya Tufan oğlu Sadıqov; born 29 September 2000) is a Russian football player of Azerbaijani descent who plays as a striker or left winger. He is under contract with TFF 2. Lig club Serikspor, but can not appear in games as foreign players are not allowed to appear in the Turkish third tier.

== Club career ==
On 24 June 2021, Sadygov signed with Russian Premier League club Khimki. He made his debut in the RPL for Khimki on 16 August 2021 in a game against Sochi, he substituted Senin Sebai in added time.

== Career statistics ==
As of match played 24 May 2025

Appearances and goals by club, season and competition
| Club | Season | League | | | Cup | | Continental | | Other | | Total | |
| Club | Season | Division | Apps | Goals | Apps | Goals | Apps | Goals | Apps | Goals | Apps | Goals |
|---|---|---|---|---|---|---|---|---|---|---|---|---|
| Olimp Khimki | 2019–20 | Russian Second League | 16 | 2 | 1 | 0 | — | | — | | 17 | 2 |
| Olimp-Dolgoprudny | 2020–21 | Russian Second League | 23 | 4 | 2 | 0 | — | | — | | 25 | 4 |
| Khimki | 2021–22 | Russian Premier League | 9 | 2 | 2 | 0 | — | | 1 (Note: Appearance in the relegation play-offs) | 0 | 12 | 2 |
| Khimki | 2022–23 | Russian Premier League | 20 | 1 | 5 | 0 | — | | — | | 25 | 1 |
| Khimki | 2023–24 | Russian First League | 18 | 0 | 3 | 0 | — | | — | | 21 | 0 |
| Khimki | 2024–25 | Russian Premier League | 14 | 0 | 6 | 0 | — | | — | | 20 | 0 |
| Khimki | Total | | 61 | 3 | 16 | 0 | — | | 1 | 0 | 78 | 3 |
| Career total | | | 100 | 9 | 19 | 0 | 0 | 0 | 1 | 0 | 120 | 9 |
