= Maksim Sutulin =

Russian footballer

Personal information
- Full name: Maksim Petrovich Sutulin
- Date of birth: 2 January 1987 (age 39)
- Place of birth: Krasnoyarsk, Russian SFSR
- Height: 1.85 m (6 ft 1 in)
- Position: Goalkeeper

Senior career*
Years	Team	Apps	(Gls)
2008–2013	FC Yenisey Krasnoyarsk	8	(0)
2011–2013	→ FC Zenit-Izhevsk (loan)	32	(0)
2014–2016	FC Baikal Irkutsk	19	(0)
2016–2017	FC Volga Tver	1	(0)
2018–2019	FC Olimp Khimki (amateur)		
2019	FC Olimp Khimki	0	(0)
- * Club domestic league appearances and goals

Maksim Petrovich Sutulin (Russian: Максим Петрович Сутулин; born 2 January 1987) is a Russian former professional football player.

== Club career ==
He played in the Russian Football National League for FC Baikal Irkutsk in the 2015–16 season.
