= Sadygov =

Sadygov is a surname. Notable people with the surname include:

- Ilya Sadygov (born 2000), Russian footballer
- Rashad Sadygov (born 1982), Azerbaijani footballer and manager
- Vagif Sadygov (born 1959), Azerbaijani footballer and manager
