= Sergey Gorshkov (footballer) =

Russian footballer

Personal information
- Full name: Sergey Alekseyevich Gorshkov
- Date of birth: 29 November 1999 (age 26)
- Place of birth: Moscow, Russia
- Height: 1.83 m (6 ft 0 in)
- Positions: Right back; right midfielder

Senior career*
Years	Team	Apps	(Gls)
2018	Olimp Khimki (amateur)		
2019–2020	Olimp Khimki	8	(1)
2020–2021	Olimp-Dolgoprudny	2	(0)
2022–2024	Khimki-M	64	(3)
2023	Khimki	2	(0)
- * Club domestic league appearances and goals as of 1 July 2024

Sergey Alekseyevich Gorshkov (Russian: Сергей Алексеевич Горшков; born 29 November 1999) is a Russian football player who plays as a right back or right midfielder.

== Career ==
He made his debut in the Russian Premier League for Khimki on 27 May 2023 in a game against Ural Yekaterinburg.
