= Dmitry Ternovsky =

Russian footballer

Personal information
- Full name: Dmitry Olegovich Ternovsky
- Date of birth: 28 September 1994 (age 32)
- Place of birth: Voronezh, Russia
- Height: 1.87 m (6 ft 2 in)
- Position: Goalkeeper

Senior career*
Years	Team	Apps	(Gls)
2011–2013	Fakel Voronezh	22	(0)
2014–2016	Fakel Voronezh	5	(0)
2016–2018	Volgar Astrakhan	20	(0)
2018	Fakel Voronezh	4	(0)
2019	Urozhay Krasnodar	8	(0)
2019–2020	Olimp Khimki	14	(0)
2020–2021	Olimp-Dolgoprudny	25	(0)
2021–2022	Rotor Volgograd	11	(0)
2022–2023	Dynamo Makhachkala	19	(0)
2023–2026	Kuban Krasnodar	11	(0)
2026	Dynamo Stavropol	8	(0)
- * Club domestic league appearances and goals as of 14 June 2026

Dmitry Olegovich Ternovsky (Russian: Дмитрий Олегович Терновский; born 28 September 1994) is a Russian football goalkeeper.

== Club career ==
He made his debut in the Russian Second Division for Fakel Voronezh on 16 July 2012 in a game against Vityaz Podolsk.

He made his Russian Football National League debut for Fakel on 4 October 2015 in a game against KAMAZ Naberezhnye Chelny.
