= Dušan Stojinović =

Slovenian football player (born 2000)

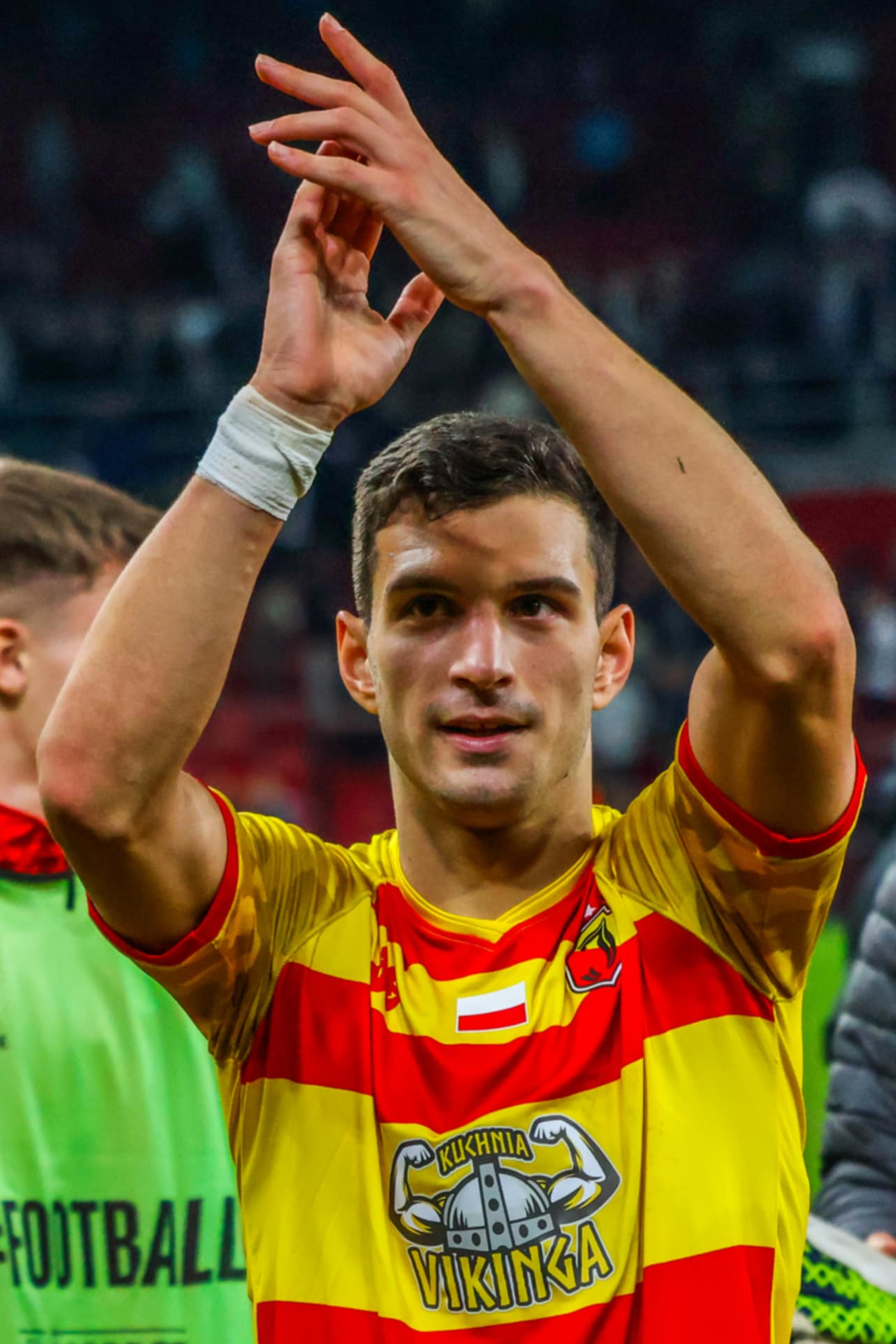
- Stojinović with Jagiellonia Białystok in 2025

Personal information
- Date of birth: 26 August 2000 (age 26)
- Place of birth: Ljubljana, Slovenia
- Height: 1.87 m (6 ft 2 in)
- Position: Centre-back

Team information
- Current team: Jagiellonia Białystok
- Number: 3

Youth career
- Arne Tabor 69
- Bravo

Senior career*
Years	Team	Apps	(Gls)
2017–2018	Bravo	1	(0)
2018–2023	Celje	113	(1)
2021–2022	→ Khimki (loan)	14	(0)
2023–	Jagiellonia Białystok	61	(0)
2023–2024	Jagiellonia Białystok II	5	(0)

International career
2015–2016	Slovenia U16	14	(1)
2016–2017	Slovenia U17	13	(1)
2017–2018	Slovenia U18	3	(0)
2018–2019	Slovenia U19	12	(1)
2019–2022	Slovenia U21	19	(3)
- * Club domestic league appearances and goals as of 19:37, 29 May 2026 (UTC)

Dušan Stojinović (born 26 August 2000) is a Slovenian professional footballer who plays as a centre-back for Ekstraklasa club Jagiellonia Białystok.

== Club career ==
Stojinović is a youth academy product of Bravo. He made his senior team debut on 14 October 2017 in a 3–0 defeat against Mura.

Stojinović joined Celje during the 2017–18 season. In June 2019, he signed a contract extension with the club until 2022. A couple of months later, on 25 August, he scored his first goal for Celje in a 6–0 win against Triglav. With the club, he won the league title in the 2019–20 season, which was Celje's first ever national championship title.

In June 2021, Stojinović joined the Russian Premier League side Khimki on loan. On 27 January 2022, the loan was terminated early.

== International career ==
Stojinović was a Slovenian youth international. In March 2021, he was included in the under-21 squad for the 2021 UEFA European Under-21 Championship.

== Career statistics ==
As of match played 18 December 2025

Appearances and goals by club, season and competition
Club	Season	League			National cup (Note: Includes Slovenian Cup, Russian Cup, Polish Cup)		Continental		Total	
Club	Season	Division	Apps	Goals	Apps	Goals	Apps	Goals	Apps	Goals
Bravo	2017–18	Slovenian Second League	1	0	—		—		1	0
Celje	2017–18	Slovenian PrvaLiga	16	0	2	0	—		18	0
Celje	2018–19	Slovenian PrvaLiga	19	0	1	0	—		20	0
Celje	2019–20	Slovenian PrvaLiga	29	1	2	0	—		31	1
Celje	2020–21	Slovenian PrvaLiga	27	0	4	0	1 (Note: Appearance in UEFA Europa League)	0	32	0
Celje	2021–22	Slovenian PrvaLiga	10	0	1	0	—		11	0
Celje	2022–23	Slovenian PrvaLiga	12	0	2	0	—		14	0
Celje	Total		113	1	12	0	1	0	126	1
Khimki (loan)	2021–22	Russian Premier League	14	0	2	0	—		16	0
Jagiellonia Białystok	2022–23	Ekstraklasa	12	0	—		—		12	0
Jagiellonia Białystok	2023–24	Ekstraklasa	14	0	3	0	—		17	0
Jagiellonia Białystok	2024–25	Ekstraklasa	22	0	2	0	12 (Note: One appearance in UEFA Champions League, one appearance in UEFA Europa League, ten appearances in UEFA Conference League)	0	36	0
Jagiellonia Białystok	2025–26	Ekstraklasa	13	0	0	0	10 (Note: Appearances in UEFA Conference League)	1	23	1
Jagiellonia Białystok	2026–27	Ekstraklasa	0	0	0	0	0	0	0	0
Jagiellonia Białystok	Total		61	0	5	0	22	1	88	1
Jagiellonia Białystok II	2023–24	III liga, group I	4	0	—		—		4	0
Jagiellonia Białystok II	2024–25	III liga, group I	1	0	—		—		1	0
Jagiellonia Białystok II	Total		5	0	—		—		5	0
Career total			194	1	19	0	23	1	236	2

== Honours ==
Celje

- Slovenian PrvaLiga: 2019–20

Jagiellonia Białystok

- Ekstraklasa: 2023–24
