= Artyom Yuran =

Russian footballer

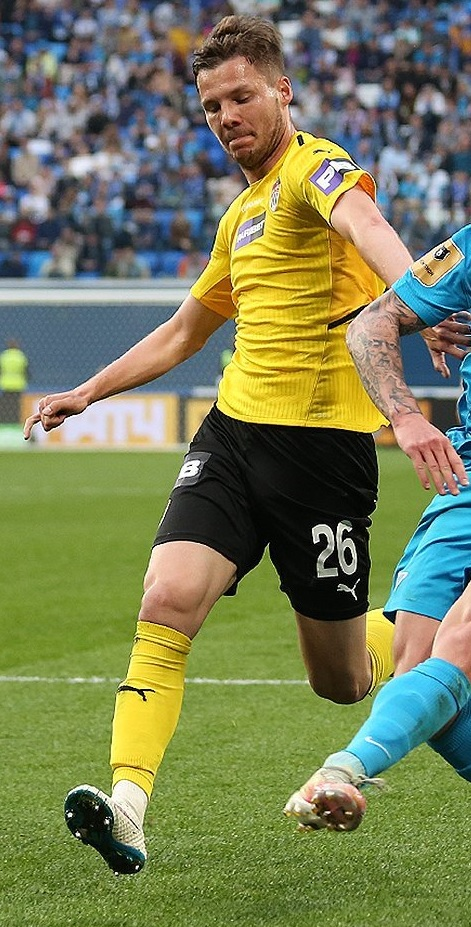
- Yuran with Khimki in 2022

Personal information
- Full name: Artyom Sergeyevich Yuran
- Date of birth: 24 June 1997 (age 29)
- Place of birth: Düsseldorf, Germany
- Height: 1.83 m (6 ft 0 in)
- Position: Right-back

Team information
- Current team: Volgar Astrakhan
- Number: 25

Youth career
- –2008: Zorky Krasnogorsk
- 2008–2015: CSKA Moscow

Senior career*
Years	Team	Apps	(Gls)
2015–2017	Zorky Krasnogorsk (amateur)		
2017–2019	Zorky Krasnogorsk	50	(0)
2020	Khimki	0	(0)
2020–2021	Dinamo Rīga	2	(0)
2021	Noah Jurmala	0	(0)
2021–2022	Rotor-2 Volgograd	6	(0)
2022–2023	Khimki	4	(0)
2023	Saburtalo Tbilisi	0	(0)
2024	Pari NN-2	10	(1)
2025–2026	Serikspor	5	(0)
2026–	Volgar Astrakhan	10	(0)
- * Club domestic league appearances and goals as of 15 November 2026

Artyom Sergeyevich Yuran (Russian: Артём Сергеевич Юран; born 24 June 1997) is a Russian football player who plays for Volgar Astrakhan.

== Club career ==
He made his debut in the Russian Premier League for FC Khimki on 9 April 2022 in a game against PFC CSKA Moscow.

== Personal life ==
He is a son of Sergei Yuran. He played under his father's management at Zorky, Khimki and Serikspor, also playing for the club's reserve team when Sergei managed Pari NN, as of November 2025, almost 90 percent of Artyom's league appearance were made with his father as a coach.

== Career statistics ==
As of 27 November 2022

Club	Season	League			Cup		Continental		Other		Total	
Club	Season	Division	Apps	Goals	Apps	Goals	Apps	Goals	Apps	Goals	Apps	Goals
Baltika Kaliningrad	2014–15	FNL	0	0	–		–		1 (Note: Appearances in the FNL Cup)	0	1	0
Zorky Krasnogorsk	2017–18	PFL	22	0	1	0	–		–		23	0
Zorky Krasnogorsk	2018–19	PFL	13	0	0	0	–		–		13	0
Zorky Krasnogorsk	2019–20	PFL	15	0	1	0	–		–		16	0
Zorky Krasnogorsk	Total		50	0	2	0	0	0	0	0	52	0
Dinamo Rīga	2020	1. līga	2	0	1	0	–		–		3	0
Rotor-2 Volgograd	2021–22	FNL 2	6	0	–		–		–		6	0
Khimki	2021–22	RPL	2	0	–		–		–		2	0
Khimki	2022–23	RPL	2	0	1	0	–		–		3	0
Khimki	Total		4	0	1	0	0	0	0	0	5	0
Career total			62	0	4	0	0	0	1	0	67	0
