= Georgi Gongadze (footballer) =

Russian footballer (born 1996)

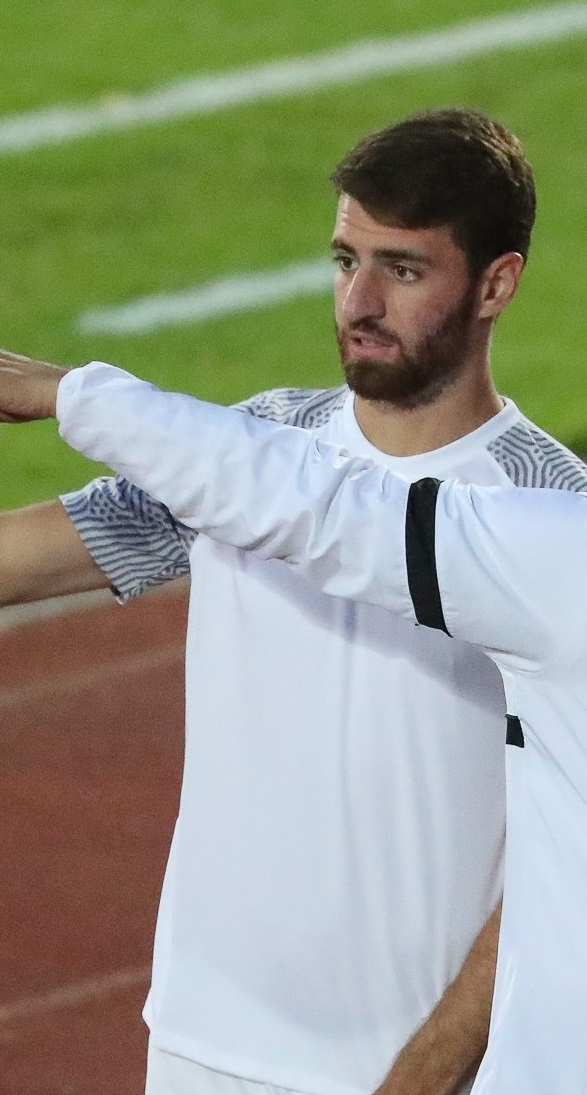
- Gongadze with Torpedo Moscow in 2021

Personal information
- Full name: Georgi Mikhailovich Gongadze
- Date of birth: 20 March 1996 (age 30)
- Place of birth: Moscow, Russia
- Height: 1.86 m (6 ft 1 in)
- Position: Forward

Team information
- Current team: Ufa
- Number: 10

Youth career
- 2004–2009: DYuSSh Moskabelmet Moscow
- 2010–2014: Torpedo Moscow

Senior career*
Years	Team	Apps	(Gls)
2015	Aventa-2000 Moscow (amateur)		
2016	FSC Dolgoprudny	0	(0)
2017	Dynamo Stavropol	14	(1)
2018	Mashuk-KMV Pyatigorsk	17	(3)
2018–2019	Olimp Khimki (amateur)		
2019–2020	Olimp Khimki	15	(3)
2020–2021	SKA Rostov-on-Don	31	(17)
2021	Torpedo Moscow	4	(0)
2021–2022	SKA-Khabarovsk	29	(10)
2022–2023	Fakel Voronezh	28	(9)
2023–2024	Torpedo Moscow	28	(4)
2024–2025	SKA-Khabarovsk	33	(12)
2025–2026	Fakel Voronezh	19	(2)
2026	→ Chelyabinsk (loan)	13	(1)
2026–	Ufa	0	(0)
- * Club domestic league appearances and goals as of 16 May 2026

Georgi Mikhailovich Gongadze (Russian: Георгий Михайлович Гонгадзе; born 20 March 1996) is a Russian professional footballer who plays as a forward for Ufa.

== Career ==
He made his debut in the Russian Professional Football League for PFC Dynamo Stavropol on 12 March 2017, in a game against FC Biolog-Novokubansk. He played the full match.

As a member of FC SKA Rostov-on-Don, he became one of the top scorers in the Russian Professional Football League, scoring 17 goals.

He made his debut in the Russian Football National League for FC Torpedo Moscow on 10 July 2021 in a game against FC Kuban Krasnodar.

On 1 June 2022, Gongadze signed with FC Fakel Voronezh, newly promoted to Russian Premier League. He made his RPL debut for Fakel on 17 July 2022 against FC Krasnodar. He left Fakel upon the expiration of his contract in June 2023.

== Career statistics ==
As of 3 March 2023

Club	Season	League			Cup		Continental		Other		Total	
Club	Season	Division	Apps	Goals	Apps	Goals	Apps	Goals	Apps	Goals	Apps	Goals
Dolgoprudny	2015–16	Second League	0	0	–		–		–		0	0
Dolgoprudny	2016–17	Second League	0	0	–		–		–		0	0
Dolgoprudny	Total		0	0	0	0	0	0	0	0	0	0
Dynamo Stavropol	2016–17	Second League	11	1	–		–		–		11	1
Dynamo Stavropol	2017–18	Second League	3	0	2	0	–		–		5	0
Dynamo Stavropol	Total		14	1	2	0	0	0	0	0	16	1
Mashuk-KMV Pyatigorsk	2017–18	Second League	14	1	–		–		–		14	1
Mashuk-KMV Pyatigorsk	2018–19	Second League	3	2	2	0	–		–		5	2
Mashuk-KMV Pyatigorsk	Total		17	3	2	0	0	0	0	0	19	3
Olimp Khimki	2019–20	Second League	15	3	1	0	–		–		16	3
SKA Rostov-on-Don	2020–21	Second League	31	17	1	1	–		–		32	18
Torpedo Moscow	2021–22	First League	4	0	1	0	–		–		5	0
SKA-Khabarovsk	2021–22	First League	29	10	–		–		2 (Note: Appearances in the promotion play-offs)	0	31	10
Fakel Voronezh	2022–23	RPL	17	5	6	0	–		–		23	5
Career total			127	39	13	1	0	0	2	0	142	40
