= Butta Magomedov =

Russian footballer

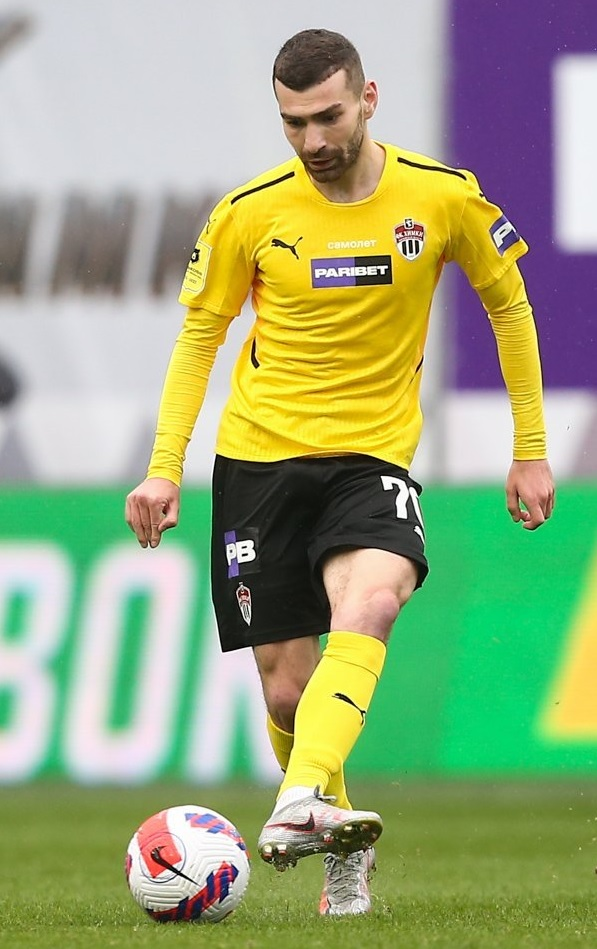
- Magomedov with Khimki in 2022

Personal information
- Full name: Butta Gadzhiyevich Magomedov
- Date of birth: 25 December 1997 (age 28)
- Place of birth: Makhachkala, Russia
- Height: 1.75 m (5 ft 9 in)
- Position: Attacking midfielder

Team information
- Current team: Fakel Voronezh
- Number: 97

Youth career
- –2007: Syroyezhkin SDYuSShOR Bronnitsy
- 2008–2009: Lokomotiv Moscow
- 2009–2010: Syroyezhkin SDYuSShOR Bronnitsy
- 2010–2013: UOR #5 Yegoryevsk

Senior career*
Years	Team	Apps	(Gls)
2013–2014	UOR #5 Yegoryevsk		
2014–2018	Saturn Ramenskoye	47	(11)
2015–2016	→ Znamya Truda (loan)	26	(3)
2018–2019	Chayka Peschanokopskoye	39	(3)
2019–2022	Alania Vladikavkaz	83	(17)
2022–2025	Khimki	91	(11)
2025–	Fakel Voronezh	47	(3)
- * Club domestic league appearances and goals as of 21 November 2026

Butta Gadzhiyevich Magomedov (Russian: Бутта Гаджиевич Магомедов; born 25 December 1997) is a Russian football player who plays as an attacking midfielder for Fakel Voronezh.

== Club career ==
He made his debut in the Russian Football National League for Alania Vladikavkaz on 1 August 2020 in a game against SKA-Khabarovsk, as a starter.

On 5 February 2022, Magomedov signed with Russian Premier League club Khimki. He made his RPL debut for Khimki on 6 March 2022 against Lokomotiv Moscow.

== Career statistics ==
As of match played 21 November 2026

Appearances and goals by club, season and competition
Club	Season	League			Cup		Other		Total	
Club	Season	Division	Apps	Goals	Apps	Goals	Apps	Goals	Apps	Goals
Saturn Ramenskoye	2014–15	Russian Second League	10	0	—		—		10	0
Saturn Ramenskoye	2016–17	Russian Second League	21	6	—		—		21	6
Saturn Ramenskoye	2017–18	Russian Second League	16	5	2	0	—		18	5
Saturn Ramenskoye	Total		47	11	2	0	0	0	49	11
Znamya Truda (loan)	2015–16	Russian Second League	26	3	1	0	—		27	3
Chayka	2017–18	Russian Second League	14	2	—		5 (Note: Appearances in FNL Cup)	0	19	2
Chayka	2018–19	Russian Second League	25	1	4	1	—		29	2
Chayka	Total		39	3	4	1	5	0	48	4
Alania Vladikavkaz	2019–20	Russian Second League	19	5	5	2	—		24	7
Alania Vladikavkaz	2020–21	Russian First League	40	9	1	0	—		41	9
Alania Vladikavkaz	2021–22	Russian First League	24	3	2	0	—		26	3
Alania Vladikavkaz	Total		83	17	8	2	0	0	91	19
Khimki	2021–22	Russian Premier League	11	0	—		2 (Note: Appearances in relegation play-offs)	0	13	0
Khimki	2022–23	Russian Premier League	22	5	5	1	—		27	6
Khimki	2023–24	Russian First League	33	4	3	0	—		36	4
Khimki	2024–25	Russian Premier League	25	2	7	2	—		32	4
Khimki	Total		91	11	15	3	2	0	108	14
Fakel Voronezh	2025–26	Russian First League	33	2	2	0	—		35	2
Fakel Voronezh	2026–27	Russian Premier League	14	1	3	0	—		17	1
Fakel Voronezh	Total		47	3	5	0	0	0	52	3
Career total			333	48	35	6	7	0	375	54
