= Vitali Sychyov =

Russian footballer

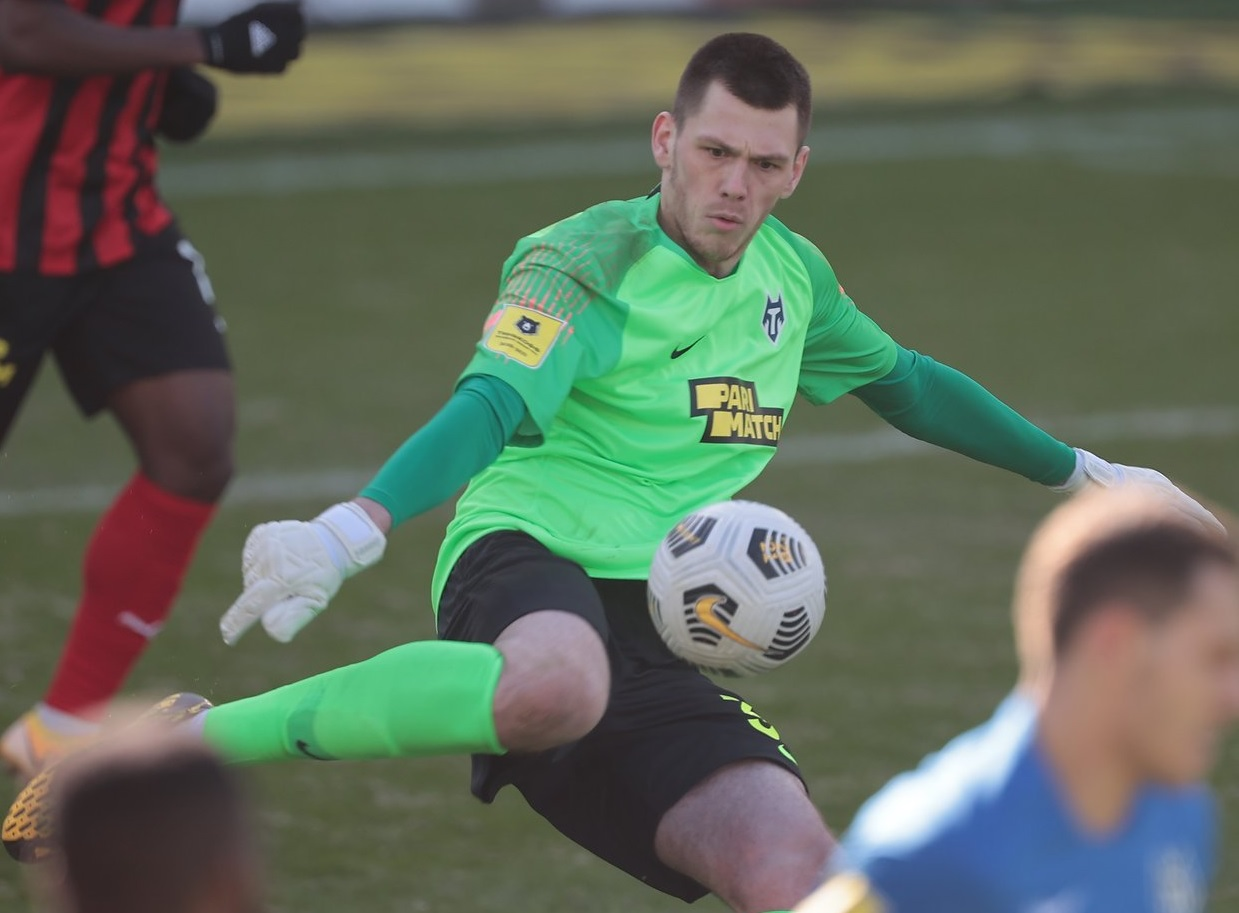
- Sychyov with Tambov in 2021

Personal information
- Full name: Vitali Yevgenyevich Sychyov
- Date of birth: 2 March 2000 (age 26)
- Place of birth: Barnaul, Russia
- Height: 2.00 m (6 ft 7 in)
- Position: Goalkeeper

Youth career
- –2012: Alexey Smertin Academy Barnaul
- 2012–2014: FC Lokomotiv Moscow
- 2014–2016: Alexey Smertin Academy Barnaul
- 2016–2019: FC Lokomotiv Moscow

Senior career*
| Years | Team | Apps | (Gls) |
| 2018–2019 | FC Lokomotiv Moscow | 0 | (0) |
| 2018–2019 | → FC Kazanka Moscow | 1 | (0) |
| 2019–2021 | FC Tambov | 4 | (0) |
| 2021–2022 | FC Khimki | 0 | (0) |
| 2021 | FC Khimki-M | 8 | (0) |
| 2022 | → FC Olimp-Dolgoprudny (loan) | 3 | (0) |
| 2022–2024 | FC Akron Tolyatti | 0 | (0) |
| 2024 | FC Akron-2 Tolyatti | 1 | (0) |
| 2024–2025 | FC Torpedo Vladimir | 11 | (0) |

International career^{‡}
| 2017 | Russia U18 | 1 | (0) |
- * Club domestic league appearances and goals as of 2 November 2025 ‡ National team caps and goals as of 4 October 2017

Vitali Yevgenyevich Sychyov (Russian: Виталий Евгеньевич Сычёв; born 2 March 2000) is a Russian football player who plays as a goalkeeper.

== Club career ==
He was raised in the academy of FC Lokomotiv Moscow and was first called up to the senior squad in December 2018, but remained on the bench. Before the 2019–20 season, he moved to FC Tambov.

He made his debut in the Russian Premier League for FC Tambov on 14 March 2021 in a game against FC Krasnodar.

On 24 June 2021, he signed with FC Khimki.

On 23 July 2022, Sychyov moved to FC Akron Tolyatti in the Russian First League.

== Career statistics ==
As of 12 December 2021

| Club | Season | League | | | Cup | | Continental | | Total | |
| Club | Season | Division | Apps | Goals | Apps | Goals | Apps | Goals | Apps | Goals |
|---|---|---|---|---|---|---|---|---|---|---|
| Kazanka Moscow | 2018–19 | PFL | 1 | 0 | – | | – | | 1 | 0 |
| Lokomotiv Moscow | 2018–19 | RPL | 0 | 0 | 0 | 0 | 0 | 0 | 0 | 0 |
| Tambov | 2019–20 | RPL | 0 | 0 | 0 | 0 | – | | 0 | 0 |
| Tambov | 2020–21 | RPL | 4 | 0 | 0 | 0 | – | | 4 | 0 |
| Tambov | Total | | 4 | 0 | 0 | 0 | 0 | 0 | 4 | 0 |
| Khimki | 2021–22 | RPL | 0 | 0 | 1 | 0 | – | | 1 | 0 |
| Khimki-M | 2021–22 | FNL 2 | 8 | 0 | – | | – | | 8 | 0 |
| Career total | | | 13 | 0 | 1 | 0 | 0 | 0 | 14 | 0 |
