= Reziuan Mirzov =

Russian footballer (born 1993)

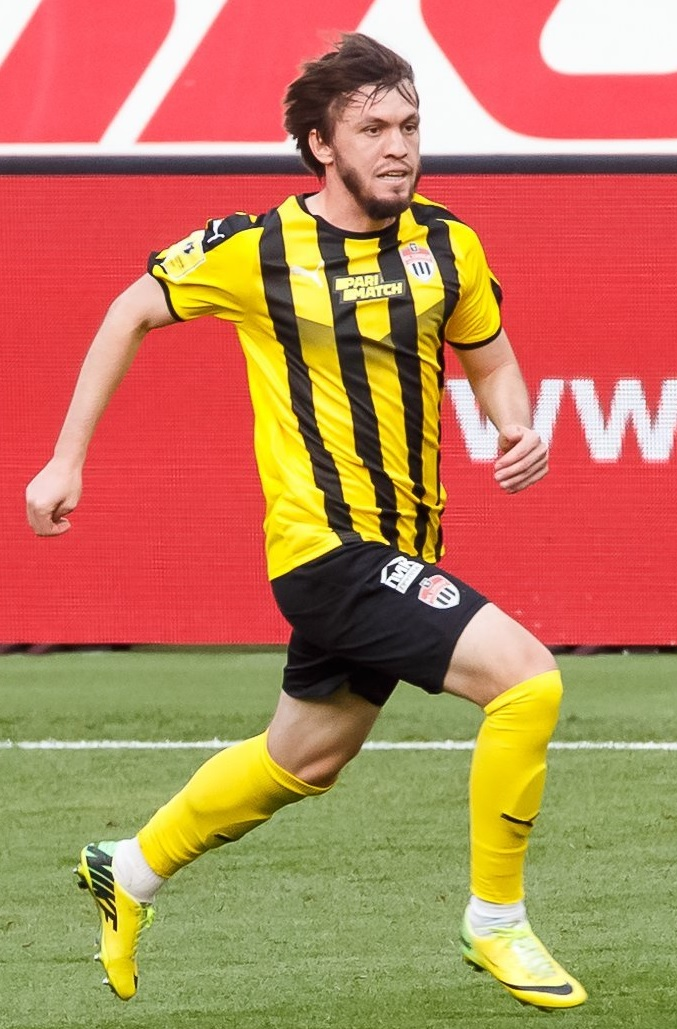
- Mirzov with Khimki in 2020

Personal information
- Full name: Reziuan Mukhamedovich Mirzov
- Date of birth: 22 June 1993 (age 33)
- Place of birth: Baksan, Kabardino-Balkaria, Russia
- Height: 1.82 m (6 ft 0 in)
- Position: Winger

Youth career
- 2000–2011: Spartak Nalchik

Senior career*
Years	Team	Apps	(Gls)
2011–2012	Spartak Nalchik	1	(0)
2013	→ Spartak Kostroma (loan)	7	(0)
2013	→ Zvezda Ryazan (loan)	16	(2)
2014–2015	Torpedo Moscow	32	(2)
2015–2017	Akhmat Grozny	13	(0)
2017–2019	Rostov	3	(0)
2017–2018	→ Tosno (loan)	20	(2)
2018–2019	→ Arsenal Tula (loan)	23	(6)
2019–2022	Spartak Moscow	27	(1)
2020–2021	→ Khimki (loan)	17	(6)
2021–2022	→ Khimki (loan)	19	(3)
2022–2023	Khimki	24	(4)
2023–2024	Neftçi	21	(0)
2024–2025	Khimki	26	(3)
2025–2026	Arsenal Tula	15	(3)
- * Club domestic league appearances and goals as of 16 May 2026

Reziuan Mukhamedovich Mirzov (Russian: Резиуан Мухамедович Мирзов; born 22 June 1993) is a Russian footballer who plays as a winger.

== Personal life ==
He was born in Baksan.

== Club career ==
Mirzov made his debut in the Russian National Football League for Spartak Nalchik on 22 August 2012 in a game against SKA-Energiya Khabarovsk.

He scored a late winning goal as Tosno won the 2017–18 Russian Cup final with a score of 2–1 against Avangard Kursk on the 9 May 2018 in the Volgograd Arena.

On 31 August 2018, Mirzov joined Arsenal Tula on loan for the 2018–19 season.

On 18 July 2019, he signed a 3-year contract with Spartak Moscow.

On 2 October 2020, Mirzov was loaned to Khimki for the 2020–21 season.

On 7 September 2021, he returned to Khimki on a new loan for the 2021–22 season.

Mirzov left Khimki in June 2023.

On 5 September 2023, Mirzov signed a one-year contract with Neftçi.

On 24 June 2024, Mirzov returned to Khimki once again.

== International career ==
He was first called up to Russia national football team for UEFA Euro 2020 qualifying matches against San Marino and Cyprus in June 2019.

On 11 May 2021, he was named as a back-up player for Russia's UEFA Euro 2020 squad.

== Honours ==
=== Club ===
Tosno

- Russian Cup: 2017–18

== Career statistics ==
=== Club ===
As of match played 16 May 2026

Appearances and goals by club, season and competition
Club	Season	League			Cup		Europe		Other		Total	
Club	Season	Division	Apps	Goals	Apps	Goals	Apps	Goals	Apps	Goals	Apps	Goals
Spartak Nalchik	2012–13	Russian First League	1	0	0	0	—		—		1	0
Spartak Kostroma (loan)	2012–13	Russian Second League	7	0	—		—		—		7	0
Zvezda Ryazan (loan)	2013–14	Russian Second League	16	2	6	2	—		—		22	4
Torpedo Moscow	2013–14	Russian First League	6	1	—		—		2 (Note: Appearances in the FNL Cup)	0	8	1
Torpedo Moscow	2014–15	Russian Premier League	26	1	1	0	—		—		27	1
Torpedo Moscow	Total		32	2	1	0	0	0	2	0	35	2
Akhmat Grozny	2015–16	Russian Premier League	5	0	1	0	—		—		6	0
Akhmat Grozny	2016–17	Russian Premier League	8	0	0	0	—		—		8	0
Akhmat Grozny	2017–18	Russian Premier League	0	0	—		—		—		0	0
Akhmat Grozny	Total		13	0	1	0	0	0	0	0	14	0
Tosno (loan)	2017–18	Russian Premier League	20	2	5	1	—		—		25	3
Rostov	2018–19	Russian Premier League	3	0	—		—		—		3	0
Arsenal Tula (loan)	2018–19	Russian Premier League	23	6	6	2	—		—		29	8
Spartak Moscow	2019–20	Russian Premier League	21	1	1	0	4 (Note: Appearances in the UEFA Europa League)	0	—		26	1
Spartak Moscow	2020–21	Russian Premier League	1	0	0	0	—		—		1	0
Spartak Moscow	2021–22	Russian Premier League	5	0	—		1 (Note: Appearances in the UEFA Champions League)	0	—		6	0
Spartak Moscow	Total		27	1	1	0	5	0	0	0	33	1
Khimki (loan)	2020–21	Russian Premier League	17	6	2	0	—		—		19	6
Khimki (loan)	2021–22	Russian Premier League	19	3	1	0	—		1 (Note: Appearance in relegation play-offs)	1	21	4
Khimki	2022–23	Russian Premier League	24	4	3	0	—		—		27	4
Neftçi	2023–24	Azerbaijan Premier League	21	0	4	1	—		—		25	1
Khimki	2024–25	Russian Premier League	26	3	3	0	—		—		29	3
Arsenal Tula	2025–26	Russian First League	15	3	2	0	—		—		17	3
Career total			264	32	35	6	5	0	3	1	307	39
