= Zakhar Volkov =

Belarusian footballer

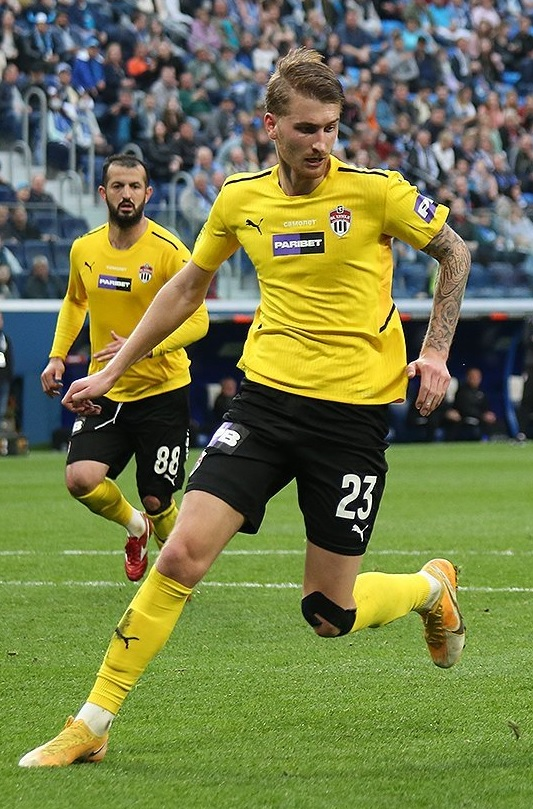
- Volkov with Khimki in 2022

Personal information
- Full name: Zakhar Vladimirovich Volkov
- Date of birth: 12 August 1997 (age 29)
- Place of birth: Vitebsk, Belarus
- Height: 1.93 m (6 ft 4 in)
- Position: Centre-back

Team information
- Current team: Maxline Vitebsk
- Number: 20

Youth career
- 2014–2016: Vitebsk

Senior career*
Years	Team	Apps	(Gls)
2014–2017	Vitebsk	2	(0)
2014	→ Vitebsk-2	7	(0)
2016	→ Orsha (loan)	14	(0)
2017	→ Naftan Novopolotsk (loan)	26	(4)
2018–2023	BATE Borisov	74	(4)
2022	→ Khimki (loan)	22	(1)
2023–2025	Khimki	23	(2)
2024–2025	→ Arsenal Tula (loan)	12	(0)
2025–	Maxline Vitebsk	40	(3)

International career^{‡}
2016–2018	Belarus U21	13	(1)
2017	Belarus B	2	(0)
2019–	Belarus	30	(0)
- * Club domestic league appearances and goals as of 9 December 2025 ‡ National team caps and goals as of 6 October 2026

Zakhar Vladimirovich Volkov (Belarusian: Захар Уладзіміравіч Волкаў, Zakhar Uladzіmіravіch Volkaw; Russian: Захар Владимирович Волков; born 12 August 1997) is a Belarusian professional footballer who plays as a centre-back for Belarusian Premier League club Maxline Vitebsk and for the Belarus national team.

== Club career ==
On 6 August 2020, the BFF banned Volkov from Belarusian football for 2 years for his involvement in the match fixing during his time in Naftan. The ban was later extended to all FIFA-approved competitions. In September 2021, the remaining year of his suspension was indefinitely delayed by BFF and he was able to return on pitch in domestic competitions.

On 20 January 2022, he joined Russian Premier League club Khimki on loan until the end of the 2021–22 season.

On 26 March 2025, Volkov signed with Maxline Vitebsk.

== Honours ==
BATE Borisov

- Belarusian Premier League champion: 2018
- Belarusian Cup winner: 2019–20

== Career statistics ==
=== Club ===
As of match played 4 July 2026

Appearances and goals by club, season and competition
Club	Season	League			Cup		Europe		Other		Total	
Club	Season	Division	Apps	Goals	Apps	Goals	Apps	Goals	Apps	Goals	Apps	Goals
Vitebsk	2014	Belarusian First League	2	0	—		—		—		2	0
Orsha	2016	Belarusian First League	14	0	—		—		—		14	0
Naftan Novopolotsk	2017	Belarusian Premier League	26	4	2	0	—		—		28	4
BATE Borisov	2018	Belarusian Premier League	18	1	6	0	3 (Note: Appearances in the UEFA Europa League)	0	—		27	1
BATE Borisov	2019	Belarusian Premier League	22	1	1	0	10 (Note: Four appearances, one goal in the UEFA Champions League, six appearances in the UEFA Europa League)	1	1 (Note: Appearance in the Belarusian Super Cup)	0	34	2
BATE Borisov	2020	Belarusian Premier League	16	0	2	2	0	0	—		18	2
BATE Borisov	2021	Belarusian Premier League	5	0	0	0	0	0	—		5	0
BATE Borisov	2023	Belarusian Premier League	13	2	5	0	—		—		18	2
BATE Borisov	Total		74	4	14	2	13	1	1	0	102	7
Khimki (loan)	2021–22	Russian Premier League	12	1	–		–		2 (Note: Appearances in the relegation play-offs)	0	14	1
Khimki (loan)	2022–23	Russian Premier League	10	0	2	0	—		—		12	0
Khimki (loan)	Total		22	1	2	0	0	0	2	0	26	1
Khimki	2023–24	Russian First League	22	2	4	0	—		—		26	2
Khimki	2024–25	Russian Premier League	1	0	2	0	—		—		3	0
Khimki	Total		23	2	6	0	—		—		29	2
Arsenal Tula	2024–25	Russian First League	12	0	0	0	—		—		12	0
Maxline Vitebsk	2025	Belarusian Premier League	27	2	8	0	—		—		35	2
Maxline Vitebsk	2026	Belarusian Premier League	13	2	1	0	—		1 (Note: Appearances in the Belarusian Super Cup)	0	15	2
Maxline Vitebsk	Total		40	4	9	0	—		1	0	50	4
Career total			213	15	33	2	13	1	4	0	263	18

=== International ===
As of match played 6 October 2026

Appearances and goals by national team and year
National team	Year	Apps	Goals
Belarus	2019	1	0
Belarus	2020	0	0
Belarus	2021	0	0
Belarus	2022	5	0
Belarus	2023	9	0
Belarus	2024	5	0
Belarus	2025	2	0
Belarus	2026	8	0
Total		30	0
