= Aleksandr Filin =

Russian footballer

- Filin playing for Baltika in December 2025

Personal information
- Full name: Aleksandr Vasilyevich Filin
- Date of birth: 25 June 1996 (age 30)
- Place of birth: Simferopol, Ukraine
- Height: 1.85 m (6 ft 1 in)
- Position: Centre back

Team information
- Current team: Baltika Kaliningrad
- Number: 25

Youth career
- 2010–2013: Spartak Simferopol
- 2013–2014: Shakhtar Donetsk
- 2015–2017: Ufa

Senior career*
Years	Team	Apps	(Gls)
2014–2015	Shakhtar-3 Donetsk	3	(0)
2015–2017	Ufa	1	(0)
2017–2018	Olimpiyets Nizhny Novgorod	23	(1)
2018–2023	Khimki	103	(2)
2020	→ Tambov (loan)	9	(0)
2023–2024	Eupen	27	(0)
2024–2025	Khimki	30	(0)
2025–	Baltika Kaliningrad	22	(1)
- * Club domestic league appearances and goals as of 27 April 2026

Aleksandr Vasilyevich Filin (Russian: Александр Васильевич Филин; born 25 June 1996) is a Russian footballer who plays as a centre back for Baltika Kaliningrad.

== Career ==
=== Club ===
In February 2015, Filin signed for FC Ufa. In August 2015 Filin took Russian citizenship.

On 22 February 2020, he joined Russian Premier League club Tambov on loan until the end of the 2019–20 season.

On 31 January 2023, Filin signed a 2.5-year contract with Eupen in Belgium.

On 20 June 2024, Filin returned to Khimki.

On 27 June 2025, Filin signed a three-year contract with Baltika Kaliningrad.

== Career statistics ==
As of match played 27 April 2026

Appearances and goals by club, season and competition
Club	Season	League			Cup		Other		Total	
Club	Season	Division	Apps	Goals	Apps	Goals	Apps	Goals	Apps	Goals
Shakhtar-3 Donetsk	2014–15	Ukrainian Second League	3	0	—		—		3	0
Ufa	2015–16	Russian Premier League	1	0	1	0	—		2	0
Ufa	2016–17	Russian Premier League	0	0	0	0	—		0	0
Ufa	Total		1	0	1	0	0	0	2	0
Olimpiyets	2017–18	Russian First League	23	1	2	0	—		25	1
Khimki	2018–19	Russian First League	35	1	2	0	1 (Note: Appearances in the FNL Cup)	0	38	1
Khimki	2019–20	Russian First League	22	1	3	0	3	0	28	1
Khimki	2020–21	Russian Premier League	16	0	0	0	—		16	0
Khimki	2021–22	Russian Premier League	19	0	2	0	2 (Note: Appearances in the relegation play-offs)	0	23	0
Khimki	2022–23	Russian Premier League	11	0	3	0	—		14	0
Khimki	Total		103	2	10	0	6	0	119	2
Tambov (loan)	2019–20	Russian Premier League	9	0	—		1	0	10	0
Eupen	2022–23	Belgian Pro League	9	0	—		—		9	0
Eupen	2023–24	Belgian Pro League	18	0	0	0	—		18	0
Eupen	Total		27	0	0	0	0	0	27	0
Khimki	2024–25	Russian Premier League	30	0	2	0	—		32	0
Baltika Kaliningrad	2025–26	Russian Premier League	22	1	6	0	—		28	1
Career total			218	4	21	0	7	0	246	4
