= Maksim Zhumabekov =

Russian footballer (born 1999)

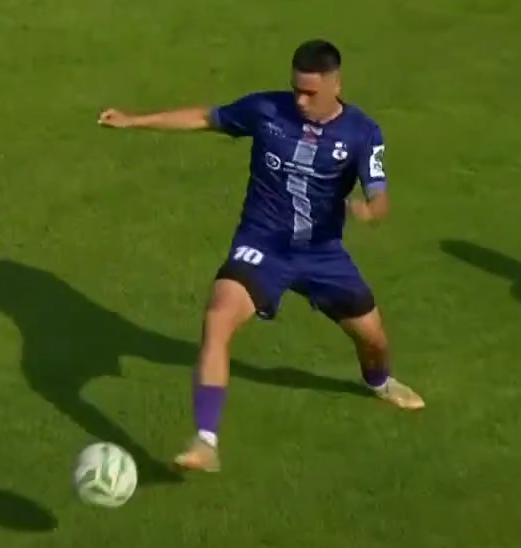

Personal information
- Full name: Maksim Konakbayevich Zhumabekov
- Date of birth: 23 June 1999 (age 27)
- Place of birth: Domodedovo, Russia
- Height: 1.76 m (5 ft 9 in)
- Position: Left-back

Youth career
- –2013: SSh Domodedovo
- 2013–2016: Vityaz Podolsk
- 2017: Arsenal Tula
- 2017–2018: UOR #5 Yegoryevsk
- 2018–2020: Khimki

Senior career*
Years	Team	Apps	(Gls)
2018–2023	Khimki	2	(0)
2018–2022	→ Khimki-M	74	(4)
2022	→ Vitebsk (loan)	15	(5)
2023	→ Slavia Mozyr (loan)	18	(2)
2024	Khimik Dzerzhinsk	13	(1)
2025	Slutsk	18	(0)
- * Club domestic league appearances and goals as of 7 April 2026

Maksim Konakbayevich Zhumabekov (Russian: Максим Конакбаевич Жумабеков; Kazakh: Максим Қонақбайұлы Жұмабеков; born 23 June 1999) is a Russian professional footballer who plays as a left-back.

== Career ==
Zhumabekov made his debut for the senior squad of FC Khimki on 15 September 2020 in a Russian Cup game against Zenit Irkutsk. He made his debut in the Russian Premier League for Khimki on 12 December 2021 in a game against Akhmat Grozny.

On 20 February 2023, Zhumabekov was loaned to Slavia Mozyr in Belarus.

== Career statistics ==
As of 10 June 2022

Appearances and goals by club, season and competition
Club	Season	League			Cup		Continental		Other		Total	
Club	Season	Division	Apps	Goals	Apps	Goals	Apps	Goals	Apps	Goals	Apps	Goals
Vityaz Podolsk	2016–17	PFL	0	0	0	0	–		–		0	0
Khimki-M	2018–19	FNL 2	14	0	–		–		–		14	0
Khimki-M	2019–20	FNL 2	17	1	–		–		–		17	1
Khimki-M	2020–21	FNL 2	23	2	–		–		–		23	2
Khimki-M	2021–22	FNL 2	20	1	–		–		–		20	1
Khimki-M	Total		74	4	0	0	0	0	0	0	74	4
Khimki	2019–20	FNL	0	0	0	0	–		2 (Note: Appearances in the FNL Cup)	0	2	0
Khimki	2020–21	RPL	0	0	1	0	–		–		1	0
Khimki	2021–22	RPL	2	0	0	0	–		1 (Note: Appearance in the relegation play-offs)	0	3	0
Khimki	Total		2	0	1	0	0	0	3	0	6	0
Career total			76	4	1	0	0	0	3	0	80	4
