= Artyom Sokolov =

Russian footballer (born 2003)

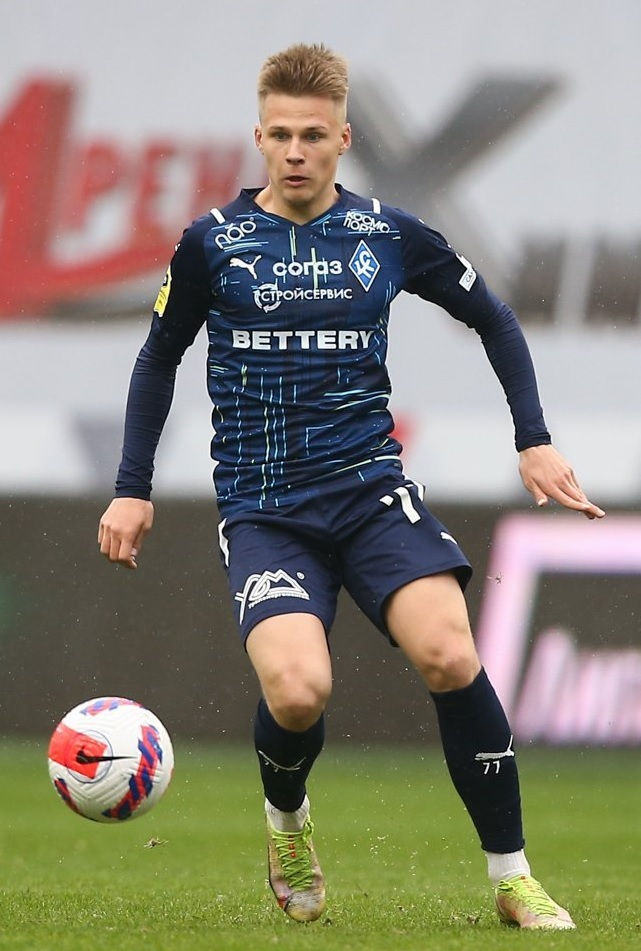
- Sokolov with Krylia Sovetov in 2022

Personal information
- Full name: Artyom Yevgenyevich Sokolov
- Date of birth: 1 April 2003 (age 23)
- Place of birth: Yakutsk, Russia
- Height: 1.72 m (5 ft 8 in)
- Position: Midfielder

Team information
- Current team: Nizhny Novgorod
- Number: 18

Youth career
- 2008–2014: DFC Puls Yakutsk
- 2014–2018: Chertanovo Moscow

Senior career*
Years	Team	Apps	(Gls)
2019–2021	Chertanovo Moscow	15	(3)
2019	→ Chertanovo-2 Moscow	2	(0)
2021	Khimki	12	(0)
2022–2025	Krylia Sovetov Samara	19	(0)
2023	→ Pari Nizhny Novgorod (loan)	6	(0)
2024	→ Krylia Sovetov-2 Samara	2	(1)
2024	→ Torpedo Moscow (loan)	5	(1)
2025	→ Chelyabinsk (loan)	16	(0)
2025–2026	Chayka Peschanokopskoye	28	(10)
2026–	Nizhny Novgorod	0	(0)

International career^{‡}
2018	Russia U-15	7	(3)
2018–2019	Russia U-16	13	(4)
2019	Russia U-17	5	(4)
2021	Russia U-19	6	(1)
2022	Russia U-21	3	(0)
- * Club domestic league appearances and goals as of 16 May 2026 ‡ National team caps and goals as of 16 November 2022

Artyom Yevgenyevich Sokolov (Russian: Артём Евгеньевич Соколов; born 1 April 2003) is a Russian football player who plays as an attacking midfielder for Nizhny Novgorod.

== Club career ==
Sokolov made his debut in the Russian Professional Football League for Chertanovo-2 Moscow on 11 May 2019 in a game against Znamya Truda Orekhovo-Zuyevo.

He made his Russian Football National League debut for Chertanovo Moscow on 17 November 2019 in a game against Khimki.

On 26 June 2021, Sokolov signed with Russian Premier League club Khimki. He made his RPL debut for Khimki on 1 August 2021 in a game against Krasnodar, he substituted Ilya Kukharchuk in the added time.

On 5 February 2022, Sokolov moved to Krylia Sovetov Samara. In February 2023, Sokolov was loaned to Pari Nizhny Novgorod. On 31 July 2024, Sokolov moved on loan to Torpedo Moscow. On 27 January 2025, he was loaned to Chelyabinsk.

== Career statistics ==
As of 28 June 2025

Club	Season	League			Cup		Continental		Other		Total	
Club	Season	Division	Apps	Goals	Apps	Goals	Apps	Goals	Apps	Goals	Apps	Goals
Chertanovo-2 Moscow	2018–19	Russian Second League	2	0	–		–		–		2	0
Chertanovo Moscow	2019–20	Russian First League	1	0	–		–		–		1	0
Chertanovo Moscow	2020–21	Russian First League	14	3	0	0	–		–		14	3
Chertanovo Moscow	Total		15	3	0	0	0	0	0	0	15	3
Khimki	2021–22	Russian Premier League	12	0	2	0	–		–		14	0
Krylia Sovetov Samara	2021–22	Russian Premier League	4	0	–		–		–		4	0
Krylia Sovetov Samara	2022–23	Russian Premier League	12	0	3	0	–		–		15	0
Krylia Sovetov Samara	2023–24	Russian Premier League	3	0	1	0	–		–		4	0
Krylia Sovetov Samara	Total		19	0	4	0	0	0	0	0	23	0
Pari Nizhny Novgorod (loan)	2022–23	Russian Premier League	6	0	0	0	–		1 (Note: Appearance in relegation play-offs)	0	7	0
Krylia Sovetov-2 Samara	2024	Russian Second League B	2	1	–		–		–		2	1
Torpedo Moscow (loan)	2024–25	Russian First League	5	1	1	0	–		–		6	1
Chelyabinsk (loan)	2024–25	Russian Second League A	16	0	0	0	–		1 (Note: Appearance in promotion play-offs)	0	17	0
Career total			77	5	7	0	0	0	2	0	86	5
