= Ilya Kamyshev =

Russian footballer (born 1997)

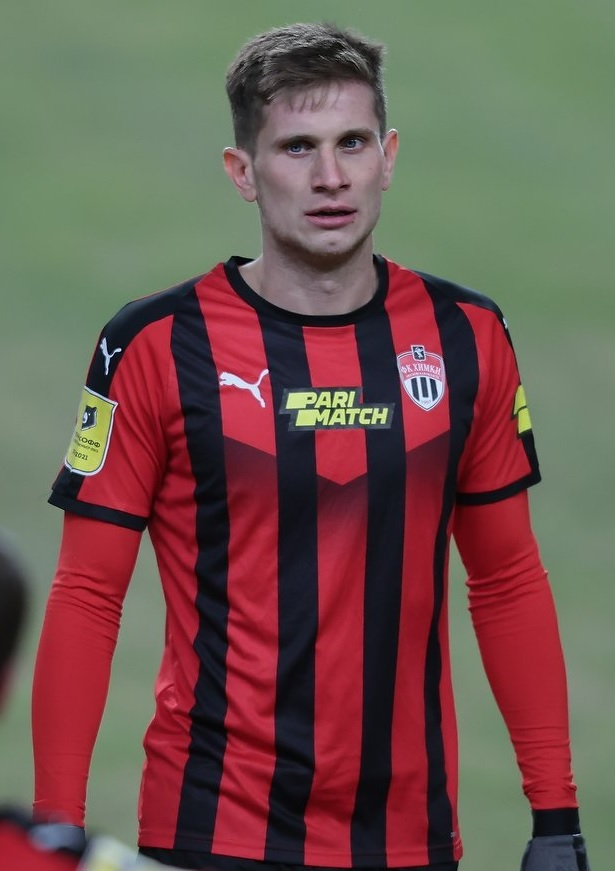
- Kamyshev with Khimki in 2021

Personal information
- Full name: Ilya Vladislavovich Kamyshev
- Date of birth: 13 July 1997 (age 29)
- Place of birth: Novotroitsk, Russia
- Height: 1.86 m (6 ft 1 in)
- Position: Defensive midfielder

Team information
- Current team: Nosta Novotroitsk
- Number: 11

Youth career
- Chertanovo Education Center

Senior career*
Years	Team	Apps	(Gls)
2014–2016	Chertanovo Moscow	33	(2)
2016–2019	Zenit-2 St. Petersburg	70	(2)
2019–2021	Chertanovo Moscow	35	(0)
2020–2021	→ Khimki (loan)	7	(0)
2021–2022	Khimki	21	(0)
2023	Rodina Moscow	22	(0)
2024	Sokol Saratov	0	(0)
2024	Chertanovo Moscow	8	(0)
2026–	Nosta Novotroitsk	21	(2)

International career^{‡}
2012	Russia U-15	4	(0)
2012–2013	Russia U-16	5	(0)
2014	Russia U-17	3	(0)
- * Club domestic league appearances and goals as of 1 November 2026 ‡ National team caps and goals as of 26 January 2014

Ilya Vladislavovich Kamyshev (Russian: Илья Владиславович Камышев; born 13 July 1997) is a Russian football player who plays as a defensive midfielder for Nosta Novotroitsk.

== Club career ==
He made his professional debut in the Russian Professional Football League for Chertanovo Moscow on 25 July 2014 in a game against Tambov.

He made his Russian Football National League debut for Zenit-2 St. Petersburg on 16 July 2016 in a game against Shinnik Yaroslavl.

In July 2019, he returned to Chertanovo Moscow.

On 16 October 2020, he joined Russian Premier League club Khimki on loan. He made his RPL debut for Khimki on 27 February 2021 in a game against Ufa.

On 18 June 2021, he returned to Khimki on a permanent basis and signed a 3-year contract with the club. His contract with Khimki was terminated by mutual consent in early January 2023.

== Career statistics ==
As of 27 November 2022

Club	Season	League			Cup		Continental		Other		Total	
Club	Season	Division	Apps	Goals	Apps	Goals	Apps	Goals	Apps	Goals	Apps	Goals
Chertanovo Moscow	2014–15	PFL	13	1	–		–		–		13	1
Chertanovo Moscow	2015–16	PFL	20	1	2	0	–		–		22	1
Zenit-2 St. Petersburg	2016–17	FNL	23	1	–		–		4 (Note: Appearances in the FNL Cup)	0	27	1
Zenit-2 St. Petersburg	2017–18	FNL	27	1	–		–		–		27	1
Zenit-2 St. Petersburg	2018–19	FNL	20	0	–		–		–		20	0
Zenit-2 St. Petersburg	Total		70	2	0	0	0	0	4	0	74	2
Chertanovo Moscow	2019–20	FNL	26	0	2	0	–		5	1	33	1
Chertanovo Moscow	2020–21	FNL	9	0	2	0	–		–		11	0
Chertanovo Moscow	Total (2 spells)		68	2	6	0	0	0	5	1	79	3
Khimki	2020–21	RPL	7	0	2	0	–		–		9	0
Khimki	2021–22	RPL	13	0	1	0	–		–		14	0
Khimki	2022–23	RPL	8	0	2	0	–		–		10	0
Khimki	Total		28	0	5	0	0	0	0	0	33	0
Khimki-M	2020–21	PFL	1	1	–		–		–		1	1
Career total			167	5	11	0	0	0	9	1	187	6
