= Nikita Kokarev =

Russian footballer (born 2003)

Personal information
- Full name: Nikita Yevgenyevich Kokarev
- Date of birth: 8 January 2003 (age 23)
- Place of birth: Dondukovskaya, Giaginsky District, Adygea, Russia
- Height: 1.87 m (6 ft 2 in)
- Position: Goalkeeper

Team information
- Current team: Krylia Sovetov Samara
- Number: 80

Youth career
- 2011–2018: Krasnodar

Senior career*
Years	Team	Apps	(Gls)
2019–2023	Krasnodar	0	(0)
2019	→ Krasnodar-3	1	(0)
2021–2022	→ Krasnodar-2	13	(0)
2022	→ Rotor Volgograd (loan)	14	(0)
2023–2024	Arsenal Tula	29	(0)
2023	→ Arsenal-2 Tula	1	(0)
2024–2025	Khimki	21	(0)
2025–	Krylia Sovetov Samara	8	(0)

International career^{‡}
2018	Russia U-15	1	(0)
2018	Russia U-16	2	(0)
- * Club domestic league appearances and goals as of 20 November 2026 ‡ National team caps and goals as of 29 September 2018

Nikita Yevgenyevich Kokarev (Russian: Никита Евгеньевич Кокарев; born 8 January 2003) is a Russian football player who plays as a goalkeeper for Krylia Sovetov Samara.

== Club career ==
He made his debut in the Russian Football National League for Krasnodar-2 on 13 October 2021 in a game against Torpedo Moscow.

On 5 July 2024, Kokarev signed with Russian Premier League club Khimki. He made his RPL debut for Khimki on 22 September 2024 against Orenburg.

On 8 July 2025, Kokarev moved to Krylia Sovetov Samara on a three-season contract.

== Career statistics ==
As of match played 20 November 2026

Appearances and goals by club, season and competition
Club	Season	League			Cup		Other		Total	
Club	Season	Division	Apps	Goals	Apps	Goals	Apps	Goals	Apps	Goals
Krasnodar-3	2018–19	Russian Second League	1	0	–		–		1	0
Krasnodar-3	2019–20	Russian Second League	0	0	–		–		0	0
Krasnodar-3	2020–21	Russian Second League	0	0	–		–		0	0
Krasnodar-3	Total		1	0	0	0	0	0	1	0
Krasnodar-2	2020–21	Russian First League	0	0	–		–		0	0
Krasnodar-2	2021–22	Russian First League	13	0	–		–		13	0
Krasnodar-2	2022–23	Russian First League	0	0	–		–		0	0
Krasnodar-2	Total		13	0	0	0	0	0	13	0
Krasnodar	2022–23	Russian Premier League	0	0	0	0	–		0	0
Rotor Volgograd (loan)	2022–23	Russian Second League	14	0	2	0	–		16	0
Arsenal-2 Tula	2023	Russian Second League B	1	0	–		–		1	0
Arsenal Tula	2023–24	Russian First League	29	0	0	0	2 (Note: Appearances in the promotion play-offs)	0	31	0
Khimki	2024–25	Russian Premier League	21	0	4	0	–		25	0
Krylia Sovetov Samara	2025–26	Russian Premier League	0	0	10	0	–		10	0
Krylia Sovetov Samara	2026–27	Russian Premier League	8	0	3	0	–		11	0
Krylia Sovetov Samara	Total		8	0	13	0	0	0	21	0
Career total			87	0	19	0	2	0	108	0
