= Kirill Bozhenov =

Russian footballer (born 2000)

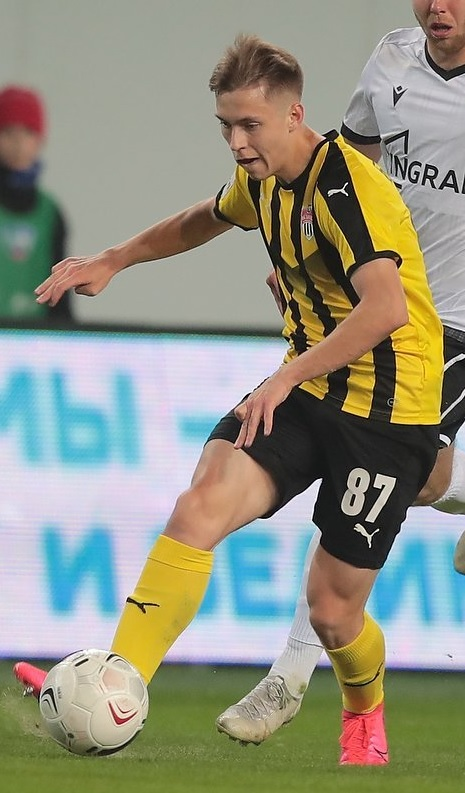
- Bozhenov with FC Khimki in 2020

Personal information
- Full name: Kirill Viktorovich Bozhenov
- Date of birth: 7 December 2000 (age 25)
- Place of birth: Barnaul, Russia
- Height: 1.74 m (5 ft 9 in)
- Position: Right midfielder

Youth career
- –2017: Altay Barnaul
- 2017–2018: UOR #5 Yegoryevsk

Senior career*
Years	Team	Apps	(Gls)
2018–2021	Khimki	43	(1)
2018–2019	→ Khimki-M	32	(3)
2021–2023	Rostov	0	(0)
2021–2023	→ Khimki (loan)	32	(1)
2023	→ Dynamo Makhachkala (loan)	7	(0)
2023–2025	Pari Nizhny Novgorod	20	(0)
2023	→ Khimik Dzerzhinsk (loan)	0	(0)
2025	→ Chelyabinsk (loan)	14	(0)

International career^{‡}
2019	Russia U19	1	(0)
2019	Russia U20	3	(0)
2021	Russia U21	5	(1)
- * Club domestic league appearances and goals as of 14 June 2025 ‡ National team caps and goals as of 12 October 2021

Kirill Viktorovich Bozhenov (Russian: Кирилл Викторович Боженов; born 7 December 2000) is a Russian football player. His primary position is right midfielder or right winger, he also played right back in the past.

== Club career ==
He made his debut in the Russian Football National League for FC Khimki on 8 September 2018 in a game against FC Zenit-2 Saint Petersburg as an 86th-minute substitute for Aleksandr Kozlov. He made his first start on 28 October 2018 in a game against FC Chertanovo Moscow.

He made his Russian Premier League debut for FC Khimki on 8 August 2020 in a game against PFC CSKA Moscow.

On 18 May 2021, he signed a 5-year contract with FC Rostov.

On 15 July 2021, he returned to FC Khimki on loan for the 2021–22 season. He returned to Rostov in December 2021. He was loaned back to Khimki on 22 February 2022. The loan was extended for the 2022–23 season.

On 18 February 2025, Bozhenov was loaned by Chelyabinsk. On 14 July 2025, Bozhenov's contract with Pari Nizhny Novgorod was mutually terminated.

== Career statistics ==
As of match played 29 June 2025

Appearances and goals by club, season and competition
Club	Season	League			Cup		Europe		Other		Total	
Club	Season	Division	Apps	Goals	Apps	Goals	Apps	Goals	Apps	Goals	Apps	Goals
Khimki-M	2018–19	Russian Second League	17	0	–		–		–		17	0
Khimki-M	2019–20	Russian Second League	15	3	–		–		–		15	3
Khimki-M	Total		32	3	0	0	0	0	0	0	32	3
Khimki	2018–19	Russian First League	15	0	1	0	–		4 (Note: Appearances in the FNL Cup)	0	20	0
Khimki	2019–20	Russian First League	2	0	3	0	–		5	0	10	0
Khimki	2020–21	Russian Premier League	26	1	1	0	–		–		27	1
Khimki	Total		43	1	5	0	0	0	9	0	57	1
Khimki (loan)	2021–22	Russian Premier League	21	1	2	0	–		2 (Note: Appearances in the relegation play-offs)	0	25	1
Khimki (loan)	2022–23	Russian Premier League	11	0	3	0	–		–		14	0
Khimki (loan)	Total		32	1	5	0	0	0	2	0	39	1
Dynamo Makhachkala (loan)	2022–23	Russian First League	7	0	0	0	—		—		7	0
Nizhny Novgorod	2023–24	Russian Premier League	6	0	—		—		2	0	8	0
Nizhny Novgorod	2024–25	Russian Premier League	14	0	2	0	—		—		16	0
Nizhny Novgorod	Total		20	0	2	0	—		2	0	24	0
Chelyabinsk (loan)	2024–25	Russian Second League A	14	0	—		—		0	0	14	0
Career total			148	5	12	0	0	0	13	0	173	5
