= Ilya Kukharchuk =

Russian footballer

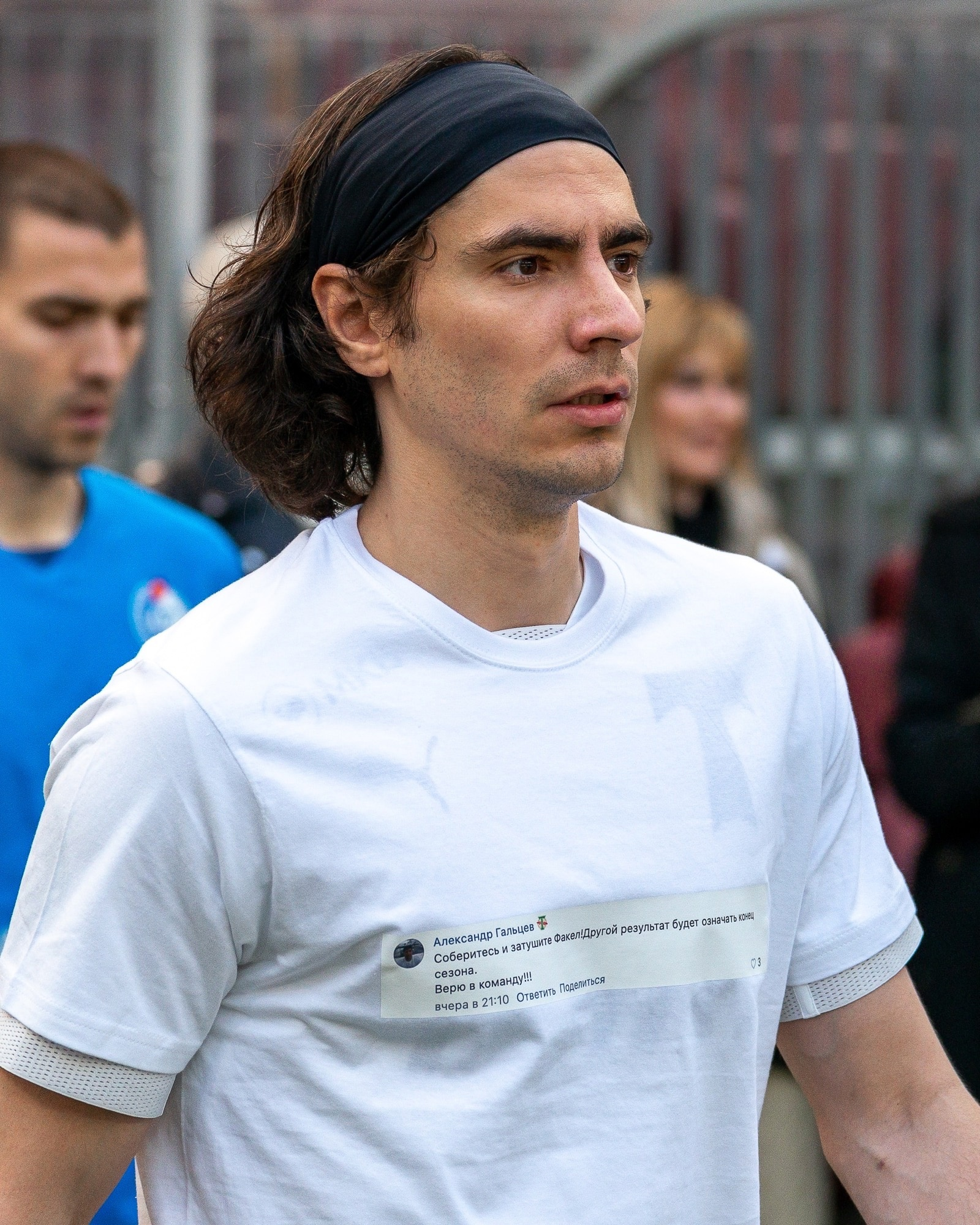
- Kukharchuk with Torpedo Moscow in 2023

Personal information
- Full name: Ilya Vladimirovich Kukharchuk
- Date of birth: 2 August 1990 (age 36)
- Place of birth: Kostroma, Russian SFSR
- Height: 1.84 m (6 ft 0 in)
- Positions: Forward; right winger

Youth career
- 1996–2003: Spartak Kostroma
- 2003–2007: Shinnik Yaroslavl
- 2007–2009: Rubin Kazan

Senior career*
Years	Team	Apps	(Gls)
2009–2010	Rubin Kazan	0	(0)
2010–2012	Anzhi Makhachkala	12	(2)
2012	→ Ural Yekaterinburg (loan)	6	(1)
2012	Ural Yekaterinburg	4	(0)
2012–2013	Spartak Nalchik	0	(0)
2013–2014	Shinnik Yaroslavl	27	(3)
2014–2016	Volga Nizhny Novgorod	61	(10)
2016	Yenisey Krasnoyarsk	9	(0)
2017	Baltika Kaliningrad	7	(0)
2017	Tambov	19	(2)
2018	Tom Tomsk	37	(11)
2019–2022	Khimki	89	(19)
2023	Torpedo Moscow	9	(1)
2023–2025	Pari Nizhny Novgorod	16	(1)
2024–2025	→ Rotor Volgograd (loan)	20	(2)
2025–2026	Chernomorets Novorossiysk	22	(1)

International career
2008–2009	Russia U-19	8	(2)
- * Club domestic league appearances and goals as of 17 July 2026

Ilya Vladimirovich Kukharchuk (Russian: Илья́ Влади́мирович Кухарчу́к; born 2 August 1990) is a Russian former football player who played as a forward or right winger.

== Club career ==
Kukharchuk made his professional debut for Rubin Kazan on 15 July 2009 in the Russian Cup game against Volga Tver.

He made his Russian Premier League debut for Anzhi Makhachkala on 7 August 2010 in a game against Amkar Perm.

On 24 January 2019, he signed with Khimki.

On 12 January 2023, Kukharchuk signed a long-term contract with Torpedo Moscow. His contract was terminated by mutual consent on 19 June 2023.

On 2 July 2023, Kukharchuk joined Pari Nizhny Novgorod. On 8 August 2024, he was loaned by Rotor Volgograd.

== Personal life ==
He is the older brother of Dmitri Kukharchuk, who also played football professionally.

== Career statistics ==
As of 1 June 2024

Club	Season	League			Cup		Continental		Other		Total	
Club	Season	Division	Apps	Goals	Apps	Goals	Apps	Goals	Apps	Goals	Apps	Goals
Rubin Kazan	2009	Russian Premier League	0	0	1	0	0	0	–		1	0
Rubin Kazan	2010	Russian Premier League	0	0	1	0	0	0	–		1	0
Rubin Kazan	Total		0	0	2	0	0	0	0	0	2	0
Anzhi Makhachkala	2010	Russian Premier League	12	2	–		–		–		12	2
Anzhi Makhachkala	2011–12	Russian Premier League	0	0	0	0	–		–		0	0
Anzhi Makhachkala	Total		12	2	0	0	0	0	0	0	12	2
Ural Yekaterinburg	2011–12	Russian First League	6	1	–		–		–		6	1
Ural Yekaterinburg	2012–13	Russian First League	4	0	0	0	–		–		4	0
Ural Yekaterinburg	Total		10	1	0	0	0	0	0	0	10	1
Spartak Nalchik	2012–13	Russian First League	0	0	0	0	–		–		0	0
Shinnik Yaroslavl	2012–13	Russian First League	8	0	–		–		–		8	0
Shinnik Yaroslavl	2013–14	Russian First League	19	3	1	0	–		3 (Note: Appearances in the FNL Cup)	1	23	4
Shinnik Yaroslavl	Total		27	3	1	0	0	0	3	1	31	4
Volga Nizhny Novgorod	2014–15	Russian First League	33	9	1	0	–		4	1	38	10
Volga Nizhny Novgorod	2015–16	Russian First League	28	1	1	1	–		–		29	2
Volga Nizhny Novgorod	Total		61	10	2	1	0	0	4	1	67	12
Yenisey Krasnoyarsk	2016–17	Russian First League	9	0	1	0	–		–		10	0
Baltika Kaliningrad	2016–17	Russian First League	7	0	–		–		–		7	0
Tambov	2017–18	Russian First League	19	2	3	0	–		–		22	2
Tom Tomsk	2017–18	Russian First League	13	3	–		–		–		13	3
Tom Tomsk	2018–19	Russian First League	24	8	0	0	–		–		24	8
Tom Tomsk	Total		37	11	0	0	0	0	0	0	37	11
Khimki	2018–19	Russian First League	13	2	–		–		5	1	18	3
Khimki	2019–20	Russian First League	18	5	4	1	–		–		22	6
Khimki	2020–21	Russian Premier League	21	5	3	0	–		–		24	5
Khimki	2021–22	Russian Premier League	29	5	0	0	–		2 (Note: Appearances in the relegation play-offs)	0	31	5
Khimki	2022–23	Russian Premier League	8	2	2	0	–		–		10	2
Khimki	Total		89	19	9	1	0	0	7	1	105	21
Torpedo Moscow	2022–23	Russian Premier League	9	1	1	0	–		–		10	1
Pari Nizhny Novgorod	2023–24	Russian Premier League	16	1	3	0	–		0	0	19	1
Career total			296	50	22	2	0	0	14	3	332	55
