= 2024–25 FC Khimki season =

FC Khimki
2024–25 season
- Stadium: Arena Khimki
- Russian Premier League: 13th
- Russian Cup: Group stage
- Top goalscorer: League: Edgardo Fariña; Anton Zabolotny (2); All: Edgardo Fariña; Anton Zabolotny (2)
- Highest home attendance: 4,405 vs. CSKA Moscow, 31 August 2024, Russian Premier League
- Lowest home attendance: 1,186 vs. Orenburg, 31 July 2024, Russian Cup
- Average home league attendance: 2,795
- Biggest defeat: Lokomotiv Moscow 4–0 Khimki
- All statistics correct as of 31 August 2024.

The 2024–25 season is the 28th season in the history of FC Khimki, and the club's first season back in the Russian Premier League after 1 year. In addition to the domestic league, the team is scheduled to participate in the Russian Cup.

== Transfers ==
=== In ===
Pos.	Player	Transferred from	Fee	Date	Source
GK	(Russia) Nikita Kokarev	(Russia) Arsenal Tula	Undisclosed	5 July 2024	
MF	(Argentina) Lucas Vera	(Russia) Orenburg		10 July 2024	

=== Out ===
Pos.	Player	Transferred to	Fee	Date	Source
MF	(Ivory Coast) Boni Amian	(Belarus) Dinamo Minsk	Loan	3 July 2024	
FW	(Russia) Ilya Porokhov	(Russia) Ural Yekaterinburg	Loan	11 July 2024	

== Friendlies ==
=== Pre-season ===
28 June 2024 Friendly	Khimki (Russia)	4–1	(Russia) SKA-Khabarovsk	Moscow
12:00				Stadium: UTC Kratovo

2 July 2024 Friendly	Khimki (Russia)	0–0	(Russia) Veles Moscow	Moscow
11:00			Magomadov (penalty missed) 7'	Stadium: UTC Kratovo

2 July 2024 Friendly	Khimki (Russia)	3–0	(Russia) Arsenal Tula	Moscow
18:00	Mirzov 14'; Rudenko 86'; Panchenko 90+1'			Stadium: UTC Kratovo

9 July 2024 Friendly	Khimki (Russia)	2–3	(Serbia) OFK Beograd
17:00

13 July 2024 Friendly	Khimki (Russia)	2–2	(Russia) Krylia Sovetov Samara
17:00 UTC+3

== Competitions ==
=== Overall record ===
Competition	First match	Last match	Starting round	Record							
Competition	First match	Last match	Starting round	Pld	W	D	L	GF	GA	GD	Win %
Russian Premier League	21 July 2024	24 May 2025	Matchday 1	7	1	3	3	9	3	+6	14.29
Russian Cup	31 July 2024			0	0	0	0	0	0	+0	—
Total				7	1	3	3	9	3	+6	14.29

Last updated: 31 August 2024
Source: Soccerway

=== Russian Premier League ===
==== League table ====
Pos	Team	Pld	W	D	L	GF	GA	GD	Pts	Qualification or relegation
10	Krylia Sovetov Samara	30	8	7	15	36	51	−15	31	
11	Dynamo Makhachkala	30	6	11	13	27	35	−8	29 (Note: Dynamo Makhachkala 4–1 Khimki, Khimki 1–1 Dynamo Makhachkala)	
12	Khimki (D, R)	30	6	11	13	35	56	−21	29	Administratively relegated, then dissolved. (Note: Khimki were not issued the 2025–26 RPL license and were administratively relegated. They were replaced by Pari Nizhny Novgorod. Khimki were then dissolved.)
13	Pari Nizhny Novgorod (X)	30	7	6	17	27	54	−27	27	Qualification to relegation play-offs
14	Akhmat Grozny (O)	30	4	13	13	27	48	−21	25	Qualification to relegation play-offs

Source: Premier Liga
Rules for classification: 1) Points; 2) Head-to-head points; 3) Head-to-head matches won; 4) Head-to-head goal difference; 5) Head-to-head goals scored; 6) Matches won; 7) Goal difference; 8) Goals scored; 9) 2023–24 position (not applicable to final standings); 10) Play-off. Note: if teams tied on points did not play an equal number of head-to-head games, head-to-head results are not considered for the standings.
(D) Disqualified; (O) Play-off winners; (R) Relegated; (X) Lost in the play-offs, reprieved from relegation after Khimki was administratively relegated.

==== Results summary ====
Overall								Home						Away					
Pld	W	D	L	GF	GA	GD	Pts	W	D	L	GF	GA	GD	W	D	L	GF	GA	GD
7	1	3	3	9	13	−4	6	0	2	2	3	7	−4	1	1	1	6	6	0

Last updated: 31 August 2024.

==== Results by round ====
Round	1	2	3	4	5	6	7	8	9
Ground	H	H	A	A	H	A	H	A	
Result	D	L	W	L	D	D	L		
Position	8	13	6	11	10	9	13		

Updated to match(es) played on 31 August 2024. Source:
A = Away; H = Home; W = Win; D = Draw; L = Loss

==== Matches ====
The match schedule was released on 20 June 2024.

21 July 2024 1	Khimki	1–1	Dynamo Makhachkala	Khimki
20:00 UTC+3	Anđelković (yellow card) 45+1'; Zabolotny 52'	Report	Shumakov 33'	Stadium: Arena Khimki; Attendance: 1,923; Referee: Yegor Yegorov

28 July 2024 2	Khimki	1–3	Spartak Moscow	Khimki
15:00 UTC+3	Anđelković (yellow card) 62'; Zabolotnyi (yellow card) 73'; Magomedov 90'	Report	Barco 49'; Ugalde 55'; Babić 72'; Zobnin (yellow card) 90+4'	Stadium: Arena Khimki; Attendance: 6,305; Referee: Vasili Kazartsev

3 August 2024 3	Rubin Kazan	2–3	Khimki	Kazan
20:00 UTC+3	Daku 45+1'; Jukić 65'	Report	Mirzov (yellow card) 25'; Anđelković (yellow card) 33'; Khosonov 50'; Fariña 67', (yellow card) 70'; Vera 85' (pen.); Golubović (yellow card) 90+2'	Stadium: Kazan Arena; Attendance: 5,738; Referee: Pavel Kukuyan

9 August 2024 4	Pari NN	1–0	Khimki	Nizhny Novgorod
18:30 UTC+3	Ožegović 18'; Gotsuk (yellow card) 20'; Ektov (yellow card) 60'; Correia (yellow card) 70'; Aleksandrov (yellow card) 71'; Bozhenov (yellow card) 83'	Report	Fariña (yellow card) 73'	Stadium: Nizhny Novgorod Stadium; Attendance: 5,804; Referee: Vitali Meshkov

18 August 2024 5	Khimki	1–1	Zenit St.Petersburg	Khimki
15:00 MSK (UTC+3)	Zabolotnyi (yellow card) 39'; Fariña 56'; Rudenko (yellow card) 70'	Report	Mostovoy 89'	Stadium: Arena Khimki; Attendance: 4,238; Referee: Aleksey Sukhoy

24 August 2024 6	Akhmat Grozny	3–3	Khimki	Grozny
20:00 MSK (UTC+3)	Zhirov (yellow card) 31', (goal) 73'; Felippe 75'; Ghandri (yellow card) 82'; Lovat 90+3', (yellow card) 90+4'	Report	Fariña (yellow card) 26'; Mirzov 31'; Rudenko 67'; Butta Magomedov (red card) 90+2'; Zabolotnyi 90+8'	Stadium: Akhmat-Arena; Attendance: 4,489; Referee: Yan Bobrovsky

31 August 2024 7	Khimki	0–2	CSKA Moscow	Khimki
15:00 MSK (UTC+3)		Report	Musaev 38'; Moisés 63'	Stadium: Arena Khimki; Attendance: 4,405; Referee: Vasily Kazartsev

15 September 2024 8	Akron Tolyatti	v	Khimki	Samara
17:30 SAMT (UTC+4)		Report		Stadium: Samara Arena; Referee: Sergey Tsyganok

=== Russian Cup ===
==== Group stage ====
31 July 2024 1	Khimki	v	Orenburg	Khimki
16:00 UTC+3				Stadium: Khimki Arena
