= FC Olimp Khimki =

Olimp Khimki
- Full name: Football Club Olimp Khimki
- Founded: 2018
- Dissolved: 2020
- 2019–20: PFL, Zone West, 6th

FC Olimp Khimki (Russian: ФК «Олимп» Химки) was a Russian football team based in Khimki. It was founded in 2018 and entered amateur competitions, representing Moscow. For 2019–20 season, it received the license for the third-tier Russian Professional Football League.

On 25 May 2020, FSC Dolgoprudny announced that it would merge into FC Olimp, with the new club called FC Olimp-Dolgoprudny. On 16 June 2020, the new club passed licensing for the Russian Football National League and applied for admission to the league, along with two other candidates. On 24 July 2020, Russian Football Union chose Alania Vladikavkaz to be promoted instead.
