= Kirill Stolbov =

Russian footballer (born 2004)

Personal information
- Full name: Kirill Aleksandrovich Stolbov
- Date of birth: 8 April 2004 (age 22)
- Place of birth: Saint Petersburg, Russia
- Height: 1.78 m (5 ft 10 in)
- Position: Midfielder

Team information
- Current team: Krylia Sovetov Samara
- Number: 20

Youth career
- Zenit St. Petersburg

Senior career*
Years	Team	Apps	(Gls)
2021–2025	Zenit St. Petersburg	1	(0)
2021–2022	→ Zenit-2 St. Petersburg	8	(2)
2022–2023	→ Yenisey Krasnoyarsk (loan)	7	(2)
2023–2024	→ Rostov (loan)	0	(0)
2024	→ Rostov-2 (loan)	5	(0)
2024	→ Chernomorets Novorossiysk (loan)	2	(0)
2024–2025	→ Zenit-2 St. Petersburg	31	(7)
2026–	Krylia Sovetov Samara	19	(1)

International career^{‡}
2019–2020	Russia U16	6	(2)
2021	Russia U18	7	(0)
2025–	Russia U21	5	(1)
- * Club domestic league appearances and goals as of 20 November 2026 ‡ National team caps and goals as of 18 November 2025

Kirill Aleksandrovich Stolbov (Russian: Кирилл Александрович Столбов; born 8 April 2004) is a Russian football player who plays for Krylia Sovetov Samara.

== Club career ==
He made his debut in the Russian Premier League for Zenit St. Petersburg on 21 May 2022 in a game against Nizhny Novgorod.

On 16 June 2023, Stolbov moved to Rostov on loan with an option to buy.

Om 14 January 2026, Stolbov signed a four-year contract with Krylia Sovetov Samara.

== Honours ==
Zenit Saint Petersburg

- Russian Premier League: 2021–22

Zenit-2 Saint Petersburg

- Russian Second League Division B: 2025

== Career statistics ==
As of 20 November 2026

Club	Season	League			Cup		Continental		Total	
Club	Season	Division	Apps	Goals	Apps	Goals	Apps	Goals	Apps	Goals
Zenit-2 St. Petersburg	2021–22	Russian Second League	8	2	–		–		8	2
Zenit-2 St. Petersburg	2024	Russian Second League B	9	0	–		–		9	0
Zenit-2 St. Petersburg	2025	Russian Second League B	22	7	–		–		22	7
Zenit-2 St. Petersburg	Total		39	9	0	0	0	0	39	9
Zenit St. Petersburg	2021–22	Russian Premier League	1	0	0	0	0	0	1	0
Zenit St. Petersburg	2025–26	Russian Premier League	0	0	1	0	–		1	0
Zenit St. Petersburg	Total		1	0	1	0	0	0	2	0
Yenisey Krasnoyarsk (loan)	2022–23	Russian First League	7	2	1	0	–		8	2
Rostov-2 (loan)	2024	Russian Second League B	5	0	–		–		5	0
Chernomorets Novorossiysk (loan)	2024–25	Russian First League	2	0	0	0	–		2	0
Krylia Sovetov Samara	2025–26	Russian Premier League	10	0	1	0	–		11	0
Krylia Sovetov Samara	2026–27	Russian Premier League	9	1	3	0	–		12	1
Krylia Sovetov Samara	Total		19	1	4	0	0	0	23	1
Career total			73	12	6	0	0	0	79	12
