= Danila Khotulyov =

Russian footballer

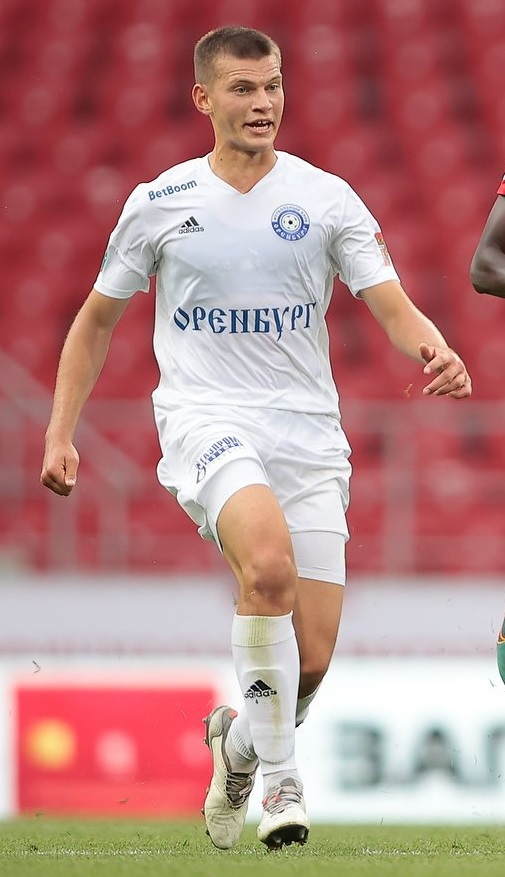
- Khotulyov with Orenburg in 2022

Personal information
- Full name: Danila Dmitriyevich Khotulyov
- Date of birth: 1 October 2002 (age 24)
- Place of birth: Orenburg, Russia
- Height: 1.87 m (6 ft 2 in)
- Position: Centre-back

Team information
- Current team: Orenburg
- Number: 4

Youth career
- 2007–2017: Konoplyov football academy
- 2017–2021: Zenit Saint Petersburg

Senior career*
Years	Team	Apps	(Gls)
2020–2022	Zenit Saint Petersburg	5	(0)
2020–2021	→ Zenit-2 Saint Petersburg	20	(0)
2022	→ Orenburg (loan)	16	(1)
2023–	Orenburg	58	(2)

International career^{‡}
2017–2018	Russia U16	13	(0)
2018	Russia U17	1	(0)
2021	Russia U21	3	(0)
- * Club domestic league appearances and goals as of 21 November 2026 ‡ National team caps and goals as of 3 September 2021

Danila Dmitriyevich Khotulyov (Russian: Дани́ла Дми́триевич Хотулёв; born 1 October 2002) is a Russian football player who plays as a centre-back for FC Orenburg.

== Club career ==
He made his debut in the Russian Premier League for Zenit Saint Petersburg on 13 March 2021 in a game against Akhmat Grozny. He substituted Yaroslav Rakitskyi in the 83rd minute.

On 10 February 2022, Khotulyov joined Orenburg on loan until the end of the 2022–23 season. On 9 January 2023, he moved to Orenburg on a permanent basis.

== Honours ==
Zenit Saint Petersburg

- Russian Premier League: 2020–21, 2021–22

== Career statistics ==
=== Club ===
As of match played 21 November 2026

Appearances and goals by club, season and competition
Club	Season	League			Cup		Europe		Other		Total	
Club	Season	Division	Apps	Goals	Apps	Goals	Apps	Goals	Apps	Goals	Apps	Goals
Zenit-2 St. Petersburg	2020–21	Russian Second League	13	0	—		—		—		13	0
Zenit-2 St. Petersburg	2021–22	Russian Second League	7	0	—		—		—		7	0
Zenit-2 St. Petersburg	Total		20	0	—		—		—		20	0
Zenit St. Petersburg	2020–21	Russian Premier League	4	0	0	0	0	0	0	0	4	0
Zenit St. Petersburg	2021–22	Russian Premier League	1	0	0	0	0	0	0	0	1	0
Zenit St. Petersburg	Total		5	0	0	0	0	0	0	0	5	0
Orenburg	2021–22	Russian First League	6	1	—		—		2 (Note: Appearances in promotion play-offs)	0	8	1
Orenburg	2022–23	Russian Premier League	14	0	2	0	—		—		16	0
Orenburg	2023–24	Russian Premier League	14	2	7	0	—		—		21	0
Orenburg	2024–25	Russian Premier League	9	0	4	0	—		—		13	0
Orenburg	2025–26	Russian Premier League	24	0	4	0	—		—		28	0
Orenburg	2026–27	Russian Premier League	7	0	3	1	—		—		10	1
Orenburg	Total		74	3	20	1	0	0	2	0	96	2
Career total			99	3	20	1	0	0	2	0	121	2
