= 2021–22 FC Zenit Saint Petersburg season =

Zenit Saint Petersburg
2021–22 season
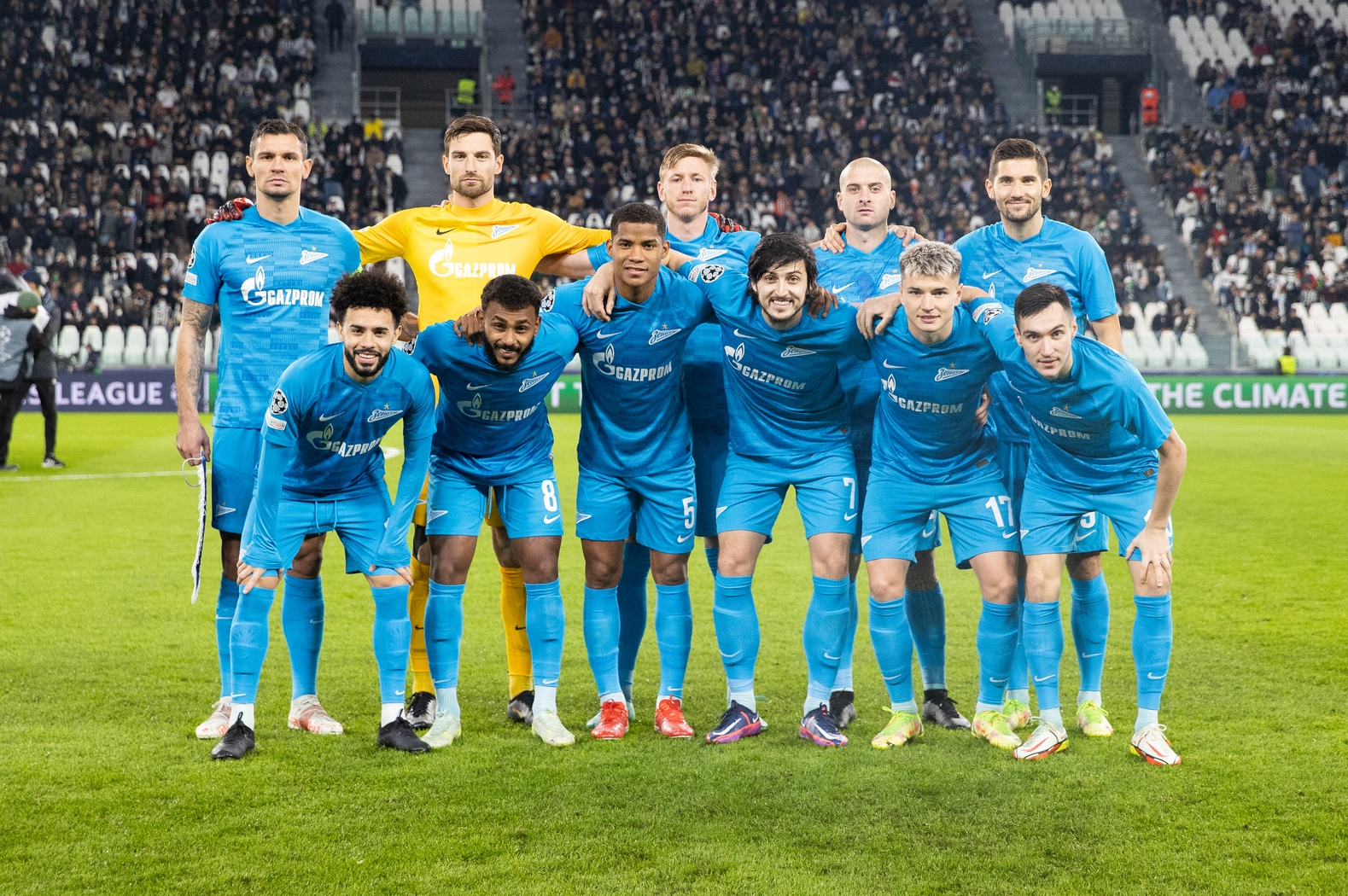
- Owner: Gazprom
- President: Alexander Medvedev
- Head coach: Sergei Semak
- Stadium: Krestovsky Stadium
- Premier League: 1st
- Russian Cup: Quarter-finals
- Super Cup: Winners
- UEFA Champions League: Group stage
- UEFA Europa League: Knockout round play-offs
- Top goalscorer: League: Artem Dzyuba (11); All: Artem Dzyuba (13)
- Highest home attendance: 47,584 vs Lokomotiv Moscow (30 April 2022)
- Lowest home attendance: 983 vs Krasnodar (7 August 2021)
- Average home league attendance: 19,443 (7 May 2022)
Home colours	Away colours

The 2021–22 season was the 97th season in the existence of FC Zenit Saint Petersburg and the club's 26th consecutive season in the top flight of Russian football. In addition to the domestic league, Zenit Saint Petersburg are participating in this season's editions of the Russian Cup, the Russian Super Cup and the UEFA Champions League.

== Season events ==
On 3 June, Zenit announced the permanent signing of Dmitri Chistyakov from Rostov on a four-year contract.

On 19 July, Emanuel Mammana returned to Sochi on loan for the season. Two days later, 21 July, Daniil Shamkin left the club to join Baltika Kaliningrad on a season-long loan deal.

On 26 July, Sebastián Driussi bought out the remaining year of his contract with Zenit St.Petersburg, and left the club.

On 13 August, Zenit announced the permanent signing of Claudinho from Red Bull Bragantino on a five-year contract.

On 2 September, Zenit announced the signing of Stanislav Kritsyuk to a one-year contract, with the option of an additional year, from Gil Vicente. The following day, 3 September, Zenit announced that they had extended their contract with Brazilian defender Douglas Santos until the end of the 2025/26 season.

On 19 October, Wilmar Barrios extended his contract with Zenit until the end of the 2025–26 season.

On 7 January, Emanuel Mammana and Zenit agreed to mutual terminate his contract and he left the club.

On 10 January, Zenit announced the signing of Ivan Sergeyev from Krylia Sovetov with a contract until the end of the 2024/25 season. On the same day, Aleksandr Vasyutin extended his loan deal with Djurgårdens IF for the 2022 season.

In January 2022, Nuraly Alip joined up with Zenit for a trial during their week long training camp in the United Arab Emirates.

On 25 January, Zenit announced the signing of Arsen Adamov from Ural Yekaterinburg on a contract until the end of 2025–26 season.

On 30 January, Zenit announced that Sardar Azmoun had left the club to sign for Bayer Leverkusen, and that they had signed Yuri Alberto to a five-year contract from Internacional.

On 10 February, Danila Khotulyov and Dmitri Vasilyev both joined Orenburg on loan until the end of the 2022/23 season.

On 16 February, Zenit announced that they'd signed Nuraly Alip on loan from Kairat for the remainder of the season, with an option to make the move permanent.

On 2 March, Yaroslav Rakitskyi left Zenit by mutual consent.

On 7 April, Zenit extended their contract with Aleksandr Yerokhin until the summer of 2024, and with Aleksei Sutormin until the summer of 2025.

== Squad ==
As of match played 21 May 2022

No.	Name	Nationality	Position	Date of birth (age)	Signed from	Signed in	Contract ends	Apps.	Goals
Goalkeepers
1	Stanislav Kritsyuk	(Russia)	GK	1 December 1990 (aged 31)	Gil Vicente	2021	2022	11	0
41	Mikhail Kerzhakov	(Russia)	GK	28 January 1987 (aged 35)	Anzhi Makhachkala	2015	2022	87	0
71	Daniil Odoyevsky	(Russia)	GK	22 January 2003 (aged 19)	Academy	2019		6	0
Defenders
2	Dmitri Chistyakov	(Russia)	DF	13 January 1994 (aged 28)	Rostov	2021	2025	51	1
3	Douglas Santos	(Brazil)	DF	22 March 1994 (aged 28)	Hamburger SV	2019	2026	108	4
4	Danil Krugovoy	(Russia)	DF	28 May 1998 (aged 23)	Ufa	2019	2024	59	1
6	Dejan Lovren	(Croatia)	DF	5 July 1989 (aged 32)	Liverpool	2020	2023	47	2
15	Vyacheslav Karavayev	(Russia)	DF	20 May 1995 (aged 27)	Vitesse	2019	2023	85	4
23	Arsen Adamov	(Russia)	DF	1 October 2002 (aged 19)	Ural Yekaterinburg	2022	2026	6	0
Midfielders
5	Wilmar Barrios	(Colombia)	MF	16 October 1993 (aged 28)	Boca Juniors	2019	2026	119	2
8	Wendel	(Brazil)	MF	28 August 1997 (aged 24)	Sporting CP	2020	2025	55	6
11	Claudinho	(Brazil)	MF	28 January 1997 (aged 25)	Red Bull Bragantino	2021	2026	31	10
14	Daler Kuzyayev	(Russia)	MF	15 January 1993 (aged 29)	Zenit St.Petersburg	2020	2023	147	16
17	Andrei Mostovoy	(Russia)	MF	5 November 1997 (aged 24)	Khimki	2019		71	13
19	Aleksei Sutormin	(Russia)	MF	10 January 1994 (aged 28)	Rubin Kazan	2019	2025	95	12
21	Aleksandr Yerokhin	(Russia)	MF	13 October 1989 (aged 32)	Rostov	2017	2024	164	34
27	Magomed Ozdoyev	(Russia)	MF	5 November 1992 (aged 29)	Rubin Kazan	2018	2022	115	8
28	Nuraly Alip	(Kazakhstan)	MF	22 December 1999 (aged 22)	loan from Kairat	2022	2022	12	0
45	Dmitry Sergeyev	(Russia)	MF	3 April 2000 (aged 22)	Academy	2018		1	0
45	Kirill Stolbov	(Russia)	MF	8 April 2004 (aged 18)	Academy	2021		1	0
74	Sergei Ivanov	(Russia)	MF	7 January 1997 (aged 25)	Academy	2015		1	0
	Ivan Korshunov	(Russia)	MF	7 March 2002 (aged 20)	Academy	2019		0	0
Forwards
9	Yuri Alberto	(Brazil)	FW	18 March 2001 (aged 21)	Internacional	2022	2026	15	6
10	Malcom	(Brazil)	FW	26 February 1997 (aged 25)	Barcelona	2019	2024	74	16
22	Artem Dzyuba	(Russia)	FW	22 August 1988 (aged 33)	Spartak Moscow	2015	2022 (+1)	247	108
33	Ivan Sergeyev	(Russia)	FW	11 May 1995 (aged 27)	Krylia Sovetov	2022	2025	15	5
82	Ivan Tarasov	(Russia)	FW	30 January 2000 (aged 22)	Academy	2017		0	0
Away on loan
64	Kirill Kravtsov	(Russia)	MF	14 June 2002 (aged 19)	Academy	2019		16	0
94	Danila Khotulyov	(Russia)	DF	1 October 2002 (aged 19)	Academy	2020		5	0
	Nikita Goylo	(Russia)	GK	10 August 1998 (aged 23)	Academy	2016		0	0
	Nikolai Rybikov	(Russia)	GK	5 January 2000 (aged 22)	Academy	2016		0	0
	Aleksandr Vasyutin	(Russia)	GK	4 March 1995 (aged 27)	Sarpsborg 08	2019	2023	3	0
	Kirill Kaplenko	(Russia)	MF	15 June 1999 (aged 22)	Krasnodar	2017		3	0
	Yaroslav Mikhailov	(Russia)	MF	28 April 2003 (aged 19)	Academy	2021		0	0
	Dmitri Sergeyev	(Russia)	MF	3 April 2000 (aged 22)	Academy	2018		0	0
	Maksim Bachinsky	(Russia)	FW	2 February 2000 (aged 22)	Academy	2017		0	0
	Daniil Shamkin	(Russia)	FW	22 June 2002 (aged 19)	Academy	2019		9	0
Left during the season
7	Sardar Azmoun	(Iran)	FW	1 January 1995 (aged 27)	Rubin Kazan	2019	2022	103	62
11	Sebastián Driussi	(Argentina)	FW	9 February 1996 (aged 26)	River Plate	2017	2022	138	25
44	Yaroslav Rakitskyi	(Ukraine)	DF	3 August 1989 (aged 32)	Shakhtar Donetsk	2019	2022	108	7
85	Daniil Kuznetsov	(Russia)	FW	23 April 2003 (aged 19)	Academy	2021		5	0
	Emanuel Mammana	(Argentina)	DF	10 February 1996 (aged 26)	Lyon	2017	2022	41	0
	Pavel Dolgov	(Russia)	FW	16 August 1996 (aged 25)	Tom Tomsk	2021		11	0

=== Out on loan ===
Note: Flags indicate national team as defined under FIFA eligibility rules; some limited exceptions apply. Players may hold more than one non-FIFA nationality.

No.	Pos.	Nation	Player
—	GK	RUS	Nikita Goylo (at Akron Tolyatti)
—	GK	RUS	Nikolai Rybikov (at Chayka Peschanokopskoye)
—	GK	RUS	Aleksandr Vasyutin (at Djurgården)
—	DF	RUS	Danila Khotulyov (at Orenburg)
—	DF	RUS	Dmitri Vasilyev (at Orenburg)
—	MF	RUS	Kirill Kaplenko (at Orenburg)

No.	Pos.	Nation	Player
—	MF	RUS	Kirill Kravtsov (at Nizhny Novgorod)
—	MF	RUS	Yaroslav Mikhailov (at Schalke 04)
—	MF	RUS	Dmitri Sergeyev (at Baltika Kaliningrad)
—	FW	RUS	Maksim Bachinsky (at Tekstilshchik Ivanovo)
—	FW	RUS	Daniil Shamkin (at Baltika Kaliningrad)

== Transfers ==
=== In ===
Date	Position	Nationality	Name	From	Fee	Ref.
3 June 2021	DF	(Russia)	Dmitri Chistyakov	Rostov	Undisclosed	
13 August 2021	MF	(Brazil)	Claudinho	Red Bull Bragantino	Undisclosed	
2 September 2021	GK	(Russia)	Stanislav Kritsyuk	Gil Vicente	Undisclosed	
10 January 2022	FW	(Russia)	Ivan Sergeyev	Krylia Sovetov	Undisclosed	
25 January 2022	DF	(Russia)	Arsen Adamov	Ural Yekaterinburg	Undisclosed	
30 January 2022	FW	(Brazil)	Yuri Alberto	Internacional	Undisclosed	

=== Loans in ===
Date from	Position	Nationality	Name	To	Date to	Ref.
16 February 2022	MF	(Kazakhstan)	Nuraly Alip	Kairat	End of season	

=== Out ===
Date	Position	Nationality	Name	To	Fee	Ref.
23 January 2022	FW	(Russia)	Pavel Dolgov	Metallurg Lipetsk	Undisclosed	
30 January 2022	FW	(Iran)	Sardar Azmoun	Bayer Leverkusen	Undisclosed	
20 February 2022	FW	(Russia)	Daniil Kuznetsov	Rubin Kazan	Undisclosed	

=== Loans out ===
Date from	Position	Nationality	Name	To	Date to	Ref.
11 February 2021	GK	(Russia)	Aleksandr Vasyutin	Djurgården	31 December 2022	
8 June 2021	GK	(Russia)	Nikolai Rybikov	Chayka Peschanokopskoye	End of season	
23 June 2021	MF	(Russia)	Dmitri Sergeyev	Baltika Kaliningrad	End of season	
13 July 2021	MF	(Russia)	Yaroslav Mikhailov	Schalke 04	End of season	
19 July 2021	DF	(Argentina)	Emanuel Mammana	Sochi	7 January 2022	
21 July 2021	FW	(Russia)	Daniil Shamkin	Baltika Kaliningrad	End of season	
10 February 2022	DF	(Russia)	Danila Khotulyov	Orenburg	End of 2022/23 season	
10 February 2022	DF	(Russia)	Dmitri Vasilyev	Orenburg	End of 2022/23 season	
10 February 2022	MF	(Russia)	Kirill Kravtsov	Nizhny Novgorod	End of 2022/23 season	

=== Released ===
Date	Position	Nationality	Name	Joined	Date	Ref.
26 July 2021	FW	(Argentina)	Sebastián Driussi	Austin	29 July 2021	
7 January 2022	DF	(Argentina)	Emanuel Mammana	River Plate	10 January 2022	
2 March 2022	DF	(Ukraine)	Yaroslav Rakitskyi	Adana Demirspor	23 July 2022	
21 June 2022	GK	(Russia)	Stanislav Kritsyuk	Gil Vicente	21 June 2022	
30 June 2022	MF	(Russia)	Magomed Ozdoyev	Fatih Karagümrük	28 July 2022	
30 June 2022	FW	(Russia)	Artem Dzyuba	Adana Demirspor	18 August 2022	

=== Trial ===
Date from	Position	Nationality	Name	Last club	Date to	Ref.
January 2022	MF	(Kazakhstan)	Nuraly Alip	Kairat	16 February 2022	

=== Contract renewals ===
Date	Position	Nationality	Name	Length	End date	Ref.
3 September 2021	DF	(Brazil)	Douglas Santos	2-Years	2025/26 season	

== Friendlies ==
Win Draw Loss Fixtures

3 July 2021	Schalke 04 (Germany)	0–0	(Russia) Zenit St.Petersburg	Kufstein, Austria
17:00 MSK (UTC+3)		Report	Mostovoy (yellow card) 45'	Stadium: Kufstein Arena; Referee: Walter Altmann (Austria)

7 July 2021	Werder Bremen (Germany)	2–2	(Russia) Zenit St.Petersburg	Zell am Ziller, Austria
19:00 MSK (UTC+3)	Dinkçi 21'; Füllkrug 45+1' (pen.)	Report	Sutormin (yellow card) 55'; Driussi 59'; Mostovoy 68'	Stadium: Parkstadion Zell am Ziller; Referee: Rene Eisner (Austria)

11 July 2021	Karlsruher SC (Germany)	1–3	(Russia) Zenit St.Petersburg	St. Johann in Tirol, Austria
17:30 MSK (UTC+3)		Report		Stadium: Koasastadion; Referee: Nenad Kostachevich (Austria)

19 January 2022	Emirates Club (United Arab Emirates)	0–3	(Russia) Zenit St.Petersburg	Ras Al Khaimah, United Arab Emirates
17:00 MSK (UTC+3)		Report	Claudinho 18'; Yerokhin 50', 56'

22 January 2022	Botev Plovdiv (Bulgaria)	2–2	(Russia) Zenit St.Petersburg	Dubai, United Arab Emirates
16:00 MSK (UTC+3)	Nedelev 6'; Marquinhos 79' (pen.)	Report	Dzyuba 31'; Ozdoyev 53'; D.Byazrov (yellow card) 79'

25 January 2022	MŠK Žilina (Slovakia)	0–5	(Russia) Zenit St.Petersburg	Dubai, United Arab Emirates
10:00 MSK (UTC+3)		Report	Dzyuba 8'; Mostovoy 21'; Yerokhin 51', 70', 85'

3 February 2022 Atlantic Cup	Zenit St.Petersburg (Russia)	1–0	(Denmark) Midtjylland	Portugal
18:00 MSK (UTC+3)	Chistyakov (yellow card) 34'; Alip 40'	Report

10 February 2022 Atlantic Cup	Zenit St.Petersburg (Russia)	1–1 (3 – 2 p)	(Denmark) Copenhagen	São João da Venda, Portugal
18:00 MSK (UTC+3)	30'	Report	Bøving 74'	Stadium: Estádio Algarve
	Penalties
	Penalty scored Penalty missed		(penalty scored) Babacar; (penalty missed) Bøving; (penalty scored) Stage; (penalty missed) Biel; (penalty missed) Ankersen

11 February 2022 Atlantic Cup	Brøndby (Denmark)	1–2	(Russia) Zenit St.Petersburg	Portugal
16:00 MSK (UTC+3)	Divković 53'	Report	Alip 77'; Dzyuba 79'

== Competitions ==
=== Overall record ===
Competition	First match	Last match	Starting round	Final position	Record							
Competition	First match	Last match	Starting round	Final position	Pld	W	D	L	GF	GA	GD	Win %
Premier League	24 July 2021	21 May 2022	Matchday 1	Winners	30	19	8	3	66	28	+38	63.33
Russian Cup	3 March 2022	20 April 2022	Round of 16	Quarterfinal	2	1	1	0	8	2	+6	50.00
Super Cup	17 July 2021		Final	Winners	1	1	0	0	3	0	+3	100.00
UEFA Champions League	14 September 2021	8 December 2021	Group stage	Group stage	6	1	2	3	10	10	+0	16.67
UEFA Europa League	17 February 2022	24 February 2022	Knockout round play-offs	Knockout round play-offs	2	0	1	1	2	3	−1	0.00
Total					41	22	12	7	89	43	+46	53.66

Last updated: 21 May 2022
Source: Soccerway

=== Super Cup ===
17 July 2021 Final	Zenit Saint Petersburg	3–0	Lokomotiv Moscow	Kaliningrad
19:00 MSK (UTC+3)	Kuzyayev 27'; Azmoun 57'; Yerokhin 83'; Mostovoy (yellow card) 87'; Kravtsov (yellow card) 90+3'	Report	Barinov (yellow card) 51'	Stadium: Kaliningrad Stadium; Attendance: 16,388; Referee: Pavel Kukuyan^{ru}

=== Premier League ===
==== League table ====
Pos	Team	Pld	W	D	L	GF	GA	GD	Pts
1	Zenit Saint Petersburg (C)	30	19	8	3	66	28	+38	65
2	Sochi	30	17	5	8	54	30	+24	56
3	Dynamo Moscow	30	16	5	9	53	41	+12	53
4	Krasnodar	30	14	8	8	42	30	+12	50 (Note: Head-to-head points: Krasnodar 4, CSKA Moscow 1.)
5	CSKA Moscow	30	15	5	10	42	29	+13	50

Source: Premier Liga
Rules for classification: 1) Points; 2) Head-to-head points; 3) Head-to-head matches won; 4) Head-to-head goal difference; 5) Head-to-head goals scored; 6) Matches won; 7) Goal difference; 8) Goals scored; 9) 2020–21 position (not applicable to final standings); 10) Play-off.
(C) Champions

==== Results summary ====
Overall								Home						Away					
Pld	W	D	L	GF	GA	GD	Pts	W	D	L	GF	GA	GD	W	D	L	GF	GA	GD
30	19	8	3	66	28	+38	65	13	1	1	43	15	+28	6	7	2	23	13	+10

Last updated: 21 May 2022.
Source: See Results

==== Results by round ====
Round	1	2	3	4	5	6	7	8	9	10	11	12	13	14	15	16	17	18	19	20	21	22	23	24	25	26	27	28	29	30
Ground	A	A	H	A	A	H	H	A	H	H	A	H	Н	A	Н	А	Н	А	H	H	A	H	A	A	H	A	H	H	A	A
Result	W	W	W	D	D	W	W	W	W	L	L	W	W	D	W	W	D	D	W	W	D	W	D	W	W	W	W	W	D	L
Position	2	1	1	1	2	1	1	1	1	1	1	1	1	1	1	1	1	1	1	1	1	1	1	1	1	1	1	1	1	1

Updated to match(es) played on 21 May 2022. Source: Premier Liga
A = Away; H = Home; W = Win; D = Draw; L = Loss

==== Results ====
24 July 2021 1	Khimki	1–3	Zenit St.Petersburg	Khimki
17:30 MSK (UTC+3)	Kukharchuk 28'	Report	Ozdoyev (yellow card) 4'; Azmoun 33'; Yerokhin 71'; Sutormin 76' (pen.)	Stadium: Arena Khimki; Attendance: 650; Referee: Evgeny Kukulyak^{ru}

1 August 2021 2	Rostov	2–4	Zenit St.Petersburg	Rostov-on-Don
20:00 MSK (UTC+3)	Komlichenko 45+' (pen.); Osipenko (yellow card) 50' (goal) 85'; Terentyev (yellow card) 60'; Kalinin (yellow card) 63'	Report	Yerokhin 30', 90+'; Azmoun 35' (pen.); Lovren (yellow card) 45+'; Wendel 75'; Kuzyayev (yellow card) 81'; Krugovoy (yellow card) 90+'	Stadium: Rostov Arena; Attendance: 0 Referee: Vitali Meshkov
Note: Match played behind closed doors due to the COVID-19 pandemic in Russia.

7 August 2021 3	Zenit St.Petersburg	3–2	Krasnodar	Saint Petersburg
17:00 MSK (UTC+3)	Azmoun 9', 35'; Kuzyayev (yellow card) 13'; Wendel (yellow card) 27'; Yerokhin 44'	Report	Córdoba 24'; Spajić 77'; Ramírez (yellow card) 79'	Stadium: Krestovsky Stadium; Attendance: 983; Referee: Alexey Amelin

15 August 2021 4	Lokomotiv Moscow	1–1	Zenit St.Petersburg	Moscow
17:30 MSK (UTC+3)	Jedvaj (yellow card) 19'; Rybus (yellow card) 34'; Kulikov (yellow card) 42'; Kamano (yellow card) 48'; Pablo (yellow card) 55'; Zé Luís (yellow card) 76'; Guilherme (yellow card) 83'; Smolov 90' (pen.)	Report	Kuzyayev (yellow card) 19' (yellow-red card) 50'; Sutormin 85' (pen.)	Stadium: RZD Arena; Attendance: 2,994; Referee: Sergei Karasev

21 August 2021 5	Ufa	1–1	Zenit St.Petersburg	Ufa
16:00 MSK (UTC+3)	Cacintura (yellow card) 29'; Fishchenko (yellow card) 62'; Agalarov 74'; Pliyev (yellow card) 81'; Zhuravlyov (yellow card) 90+'	Report	Malcom 10'	Stadium: BetBoom Arena; Attendance: 761; Referee: Pavel Shadykhanov

26 August 2021 6	Zenit St.Petersburg	1–0	CSKA Moscow	Saint Petersburg
20:45 MSK (UTC+3)	Malcom (yellow card) 78'; Azmoun 82'	Report	Dzagoev (yellow card) 21'; Mukhin (yellow card) 49'	Stadium: Krestovsky Stadium; Attendance: 998; Referee: Sergey Ivanov

11 September 2021 7	Zenit St.Petersburg	3–1	Akhmat Grozny	Saint Petersburg
16:30 MSK (UTC+3)	Wendel 9' (yellow card) 71'; Yerokhin 33'; Malcom 83'	Report	Todorović (yellow card) 20'; Utsiyev (yellow card) 39'; Polyarus (yellow card) 45'; Konaté 51'	Stadium: Krestovsky Stadium; Attendance: 7,516; Referee: Evgeny Kukulyak^{ru}

20 September 2021 8	Rubin Kazan	1–3	Zenit St.Petersburg	Kazan
18:30 MSK (UTC+3)	Nizhegorodov (yellow card) 50'; Chistyakov 67' (o.g.); Hwang (yellow card) 76'; Zotov (yellow card) 90+2'	Report	Dzyuba 24', 43'; Claudinho 29'; Rakitskyi (yellow card) 67'	Stadium: Ak Bars Arena; Attendance: 7,480; Referee: Sergey Ivanov

25 September 2021 9	Zenit St.Petersburg	2–1	Krylia Sovetov Samara	Saint Petersburg
16:30 MSK (UTC+3)	Kuzyayev (yellow card) 26'; Dzyuba 55'; Yerokhin (yellow card) 55'; Sutormin 79' (pen.)	Report	Zeffane (yellow card) 5'; Glushenkov (yellow card) 9'; Zinkovskiy 14', (yellow card) 78'; Sergeyev (yellow card) 71'; Soldatenkov (yellow card) 85'	Stadium: Krestovsky Stadium; Attendance: 13,471; Referee: Vitali Meshkov

3 October 2021 10	Zenit St.Petersburg	1–2	Sochi	Saint Petersburg
16:30 MSK (UTC+3)	Azmoun (red card) 42'; Dzyuba 45'	Report	Terekhov (yellow card) 44' (goal) 71'; Zaika (yellow card) 63'; Cassierra 67' (yellow card) 90+'; Noboa (yellow card) 90+'	Stadium: Krestovsky Stadium; Attendance: 12,762; Referee: Pavel Shadykhanov

16 October 2021 11	Arsenal Tula	2–1	Zenit St.Petersburg	Tula
14:00 MSK (UTC+3)	Markov (yellow card) 40'; Davitashvili 54'; Khlusevich (yellow card) 62'; Lutsenko (yellow card) 74'; Kochenkov (yellow card) 81'; K.Kangwa 90' (yellow card) 90+'	Report	Kuzyaev (yellow card) 19'; Dzyuba 88'	Stadium: Arsenal Stadium; Attendance: 4 867; Referee: Pavel Kukuyan^{ru}

24 October 2021 12	Zenit St.Petersburg	7–1	Spartak Moscow	Saint Petersburg
19:00 MSK (UTC+3)	Azmoun 20', 36'; Claudinho 28'; Mostovoy 45', 56'; Rakitskyi (yellow card) 72'; Dzyuba 80' (pen.); Yerokhin 88'	Report	Promes 53'; Caufriez (yellow card) 65' (yellow-red card) 79'; Sobolev (yellow card) 90+'	Stadium: Krestovsky Stadium; Attendance: 18,721; Referee: Sergey Ivanov

29 October 2021 13	Zenit St.Petersburg	4–1	Dynamo Moscow	Saint Petersburg
19:00 MSK (UTC+3)	Claudinho 8'; Wendel (yellow card) 45+1' (goal) 66'; Karavayev (yellow card) 55'; Lovren (yellow card) 62'; Dzyuba 69'; Rakitskyi 85'	Report	Skopintsev (yellow card) 25'; Fomin (yellow card) 51' (goal) 56'; Zakharyan (yellow card) 76'; Ordets (yellow card) 79'	Stadium: Krestovsky Stadium; Attendance: 18,190; Referee: Sergei Karasev

7 November 2021 14	Ural Yekaterinburg	0–0	Zenit St.Petersburg	Yekaterinburg
14:00 MSK (UTC+3)	Yegorychev (yellow card) 20'	Report	Rakitskyi (yellow card) 34'; Claudinho (red card) 51'; Chistyakov (yellow card) 87'	Stadium: Ekaterinburg Arena; Attendance: 492; Referee: Igor Panin

19 November 2021 15	Zenit St.Petersburg	5–1	Nizhny Novgorod	Saint Petersburg
19:00 MSK (UTC+3)	Malcom 24'; Dzyuba 34', 45+', 60'; Chistyakov 88'; Azmoun (yellow card) 90+'; Barrios (yellow card) 90+'; Sutormin (yellow card) 90+'	Report	Kozlov 34'; Boumal (yellow card) 41' (yellow-red card) 43'; Gorbunov (yellow card) 54'; Miladinović (yellow card) 90'; Sapeta (yellow card) 90+'	Stadium: Krestovsky Stadium; Attendance: 16,575; Referee: Pavel Kukuyan^{ru}

28 November 2021 16	CSKA Moscow	0–2	Zenit St.Petersburg	Moscow
20:00 MSK (UTC+3)	Zaynutdinov (yellow card) 20'	Report	Claudinho 34'; Azmoun (yellow card) 63'; Mostovoy 90+'	Stadium: VEB Arena; Attendance: 7,993; Referee: Vladislav Bezborodov

3 December 2021 17	Zenit St.Petersburg	2–2	Rostov	Saint Petersburg
19:00 MSK (UTC+3)	Chistyakov (yellow card) 9'; Rakitskyi (yellow card) 27'; Claudinho 31', 69' (pen.) (yellow card) 78'; Yerokhin (yellow card) 42'; Sutormin (yellow card) 86'	Report	Poloz 11' (pen.); Komlichenko 25' (yellow card) 54'; Glebov (yellow card) 29'; Terentyev (yellow card) 60'; Kalinin (yellow card) 61'; Melyokhin (yellow card) 80'	Stadium: Krestovsky Stadium; Attendance: 19,890; Referee: Alexey Matyunin

12 December 2021 18	Dynamo Moscow	1–1	Zenit St.Petersburg	Moscow
14:00 MSK (UTC+3)	Moro (yellow card) 69'; Skopintsev 72'	Report	Claudinho (penalty missed) 11' 32'; Douglas (yellow card) 45+'	Stadium: VTB Arena; Attendance: 17,494; Referee: Sergei Karasev

28 February 2022 19	Zenit St.Petersburg	3–2	Rubin Kazan	Saint Petersburg
19:00 MSK (UTC+3)	Barrios (yellow card) 31'; Alberto 48'; Sutormin 55' (pen.); Sergeyev 90+2'	Report	Musayev (yellow card) 17' (yellow-red card) 78'; Lomovitsky (yellow card) 54'; Lisakovich 61', 67'	Stadium: Krestovsky Stadium; Attendance: 16,668; Referee: Evgeny Kukulyak^{ru}

6 March 2022 20	Zenit St.Petersburg	2–0	Ufa	Saint Petersburg
16:30 MSK (UTC+3)	Krugovoy 50'; Claudinho (yellow card) 53'; Malcom 67'	Report	Kamilov (yellow card) 87'	Stadium: Krestovsky Stadium; Attendance: 24,377; Referee: Sergey Ivanov

13 March 2022 21	Krylia Sovetov Samara	1–1	Zenit St.Petersburg	Samara
16:30 MSK (UTC+3)	Glushenkov (yellow card) 70'; Costanza (yellow card) 84'; Barać 90+'; Tsypchenko (yellow card) 90+'	Report	Claudinho (yellow card) 3'; Wendel (yellow card) 74' (yellow-red card) 90+'; Krugovoy 87'	Stadium: Solidarnost Arena; Attendance: 8,776; Referee: Anton Frolov

19 March 2022 22	Zenit St.Petersburg	3–0	Arsenal Tula	Saint Petersburg
19:30 MSK (UTC+3)	Malcom 44', 55'; Alberto 89'	Report	Sokol (yellow card) 33'; Despotović (yellow card) 38'; Smolnikov (yellow card) 41'	Stadium: Krestovsky Stadium; Attendance: 31,426; Referee: Sergei Karasev

3 April 2022 23	Sochi	0–0	Zenit St.Petersburg	Sochi
19:00 MSK (UTC+3)	Yurganov (yellow card) 45+1'; Melkadze (yellow card) 71'	Report	Malcom (yellow card) 42'	Stadium: Fisht Olympic Stadium; Attendance: 10,307; Referee: Vladimir Moskalyov

9 April 2022 24	Akhmat Grozny	0–2	Zenit St.Petersburg	Grozny
19:30 MSK (UTC+3)	Shvets (yellow card) 36'; Utkin (yellow card) 38'; Berisha (yellow card) 45+'; Bogosavac (yellow card) 49'; Semyonov (yellow card) 74'; Sebai (yellow card) 88'	Report	Alberto 39' (yellow card) 85'; Barrios (yellow card) 50'; Yerokhin 90'; Kuzyayev (yellow card) 90+'	Stadium: Akhmat-Arena; Attendance: 6,750; Referee: Alexey Matyunin

16 April 2022 25	Zenit St.Petersburg	3–1	Ural Yekaterinburg	Saint Petersburg
16:30 MSK (UTC+3)	Claudinho (penalty missed) 12' 12'; Krugovoy (yellow card) 27'; Alberto 37'; Kuzyayev (yellow card) 51'; Malcom (yellow card) 53'; Chistyakov (yellow card) 72'; Dzyuba 73'	Report	Kuzmichyov (yellow card) 11'; Magomadov (yellow card) 17'; Yegorychev (yellow card) 45'; Bicfalvi (yellow card) 66'; Zheleznov 83'	Stadium: Krestovsky Stadium; Attendance: 36,787; Referee: Vitali Meshkov

25 April 2022 26	Krasnodar	1–3	Zenit St.Petersburg	Krasnodar
19:00 MSK (UTC+3)	Manelov 73' (yellow card) 85'; Petrov (yellow card) 88'	Report	Sergeyev 35'; Malcom 42'; Mostovoy (yellow card) 85'; Ozdoyev 88'	Stadium: Krasnodar Stadium; Attendance: 17,590; Referee: Evgeny Kukulyak

30 April 2022 27	Zenit St.Petersburg	3–1	Lokomotiv Moscow	Saint Petersburg
19:30 MSK (UTC+3)	Sergeyev 28'; Malcom 42'; Mostovoy 77'	Report	Kerk 4'; Mampassi (yellow card) 45+'; Nenakhov (yellow card) 90'	Stadium: Krestovsky Stadium; Attendance: 47,584; Referee: Vladimir Moskalyov

7 May 2022 28	Zenit St.Petersburg	1–0	Khimki	Saint Petersburg
16:30 MSK (UTC+3)	Sergeyev 14'; Adamov (yellow card) 90+'	Report		Stadium: Krestovsky Stadium; Attendance: 40,068; Referee: Alexey Amelin

15 May 2022 29	Spartak Moscow	1–1	Zenit St.Petersburg	Moscow
16:30 MSK (UTC+3)	Sobolev 49' (yellow card) 51'; Martins (yellow card) 55'; Moses (yellow card) 85'; Khlusevich (yellow card) 87'; Dzhikiya (yellow card) 90+'	Report	Mostovoy 90+'	Stadium: Otkritie Arena; Attendance: 16,598; Referee: Pavel Kukuyan

21 May 2022 30	Nizhny Novgorod	1–0	Zenit St.Petersburg	Nizhny Novgorod
17:00 MSK (UTC+3)	Kalinsky 20' (pen.); Karasyov (yellow card) 85'	Report	Ozdoyev (yellow card) 19'	Stadium: Nizhny Novgorod Stadium; Attendance: 30,235; Referee: Vitali Meshkov

=== Russian Cup ===
3 March 2022 Round of 16	Zenit St.Petersburg	6–0	KAMAZ Naberezhnye Chelny	Saint Petersburg
20:15 MSK (UTC+3)	Mostovoy 17', 48'; Alberto 26', 45+1'; Yerokhin 37'; Adamov (yellow card) 55'; Dzyuba 85'	Report	Potapov (yellow card) 30'; Ayukin (yellow card) 76'	Stadium: Krestovsky Stadium; Referee: Anton Frolov

20 April 2022 Quarter-final	Alania Vladikavkaz	2–2 (6–5 p)	Zenit St.Petersburg	Grozny
17:00 MSK (UTC+3)	Shavlokhov (yellow card) 26'; Dav.Kobesov (yellow card) 39'; Gurtsiyev 55'; Zaseyev (yellow card) 59'; Kochiyev (yellow card) 59'; Khubulov (yellow card) 74'; Giorgobiani 90+2'	Report	Santos 71'; Sergeyev 81'	Stadium: Sultan Bilimkhanov Stadium; Referee: Pavel Kukuyan
	Penalties
	Soldatenko (penalty scored); Khadartsev (penalty missed); Mashukov (penalty scored); Tsarayev (penalty scored); Khosonov (penalty scored); Giorgobiani (penalty scored); Khugayev (penalty scored)		(penalty scored) Yuri Alberto; (penalty scored) Kuzyayev; (penalty scored) Sergeyev; (penalty missed) Sutormin; (penalty scored) Santos; (penalty scored) Malcom; (penalty missed) Krugovoy

=== UEFA Champions League ===
The draw for the UEFA Champions League group stage was held on 26 August, drawing Zenit with Chelsea, Juventus and Malmö.

==== Group stage ====
Pos	Team	Pld	W	D	L	GF	GA	GD	Pts	Qualification
1	(Italy) Juventus	6	5	0	1	10	6	+4	15	Advance to knockout phase
2	(England) Chelsea	6	4	1	1	13	4	+9	13	Advance to knockout phase
3	(Russia) Zenit Saint Petersburg	6	1	2	3	10	10	0	5	Transfer to Europa League
4	(Sweden) Malmö FF	6	0	1	5	1	14	−13	1	

Source: UEFA
Rules for classification: Group stage tiebreakers

14 September 2021 1	Chelsea (England)	1–0	(Russia) Zenit St.Petersburg	London
22:00 MSK (UTC+3)	Azpilicueta (yellow card) 45'; Lukaku 69'	Report	Rakitskyi (yellow card) 62'	Stadium: Stamford Bridge; Attendance: 39,252; Referee: Bartosz Frankowski (Poland)

29 September 2021 2	Zenit St.Petersburg (Russia)	4–0	(Sweden) Malmö FF	Saint Petersburg
19:45 MSK (UTC+3)	Claudinho 9'; Kuzyayev 49'; Sutormin 80'; Wendel 90+4'	Report	Rakip (yellow card) 30'; Ahmedhodžić (red card) 53'; Brorsson (yellow card) 86'	Stadium: Krestovsky Stadium; Attendance: 15,339; Referee: Anastasios Sidiropoulos (Greece)

20 October 2021 3	Zenit St.Petersburg (Russia)	0–1	(Italy) Juventus	Saint Petersburg
22:00 MSK (UTC+3)	Barrios (yellow card) 30'; Karavaev (yellow card) 46'	Report	Arthur (yellow card) 60'; Kulusevski 86'; Ramsey (yellow card) 90+'	Stadium: Krestovsky Stadium; Attendance: 18,717; Referee: Sandro Schärer (Swiss)

2 November 2021 4	Juventus (Italy)	4–2	(Russia) Zenit St.Petersburg	Turin
23:00 MSK (UTC+3)	Dybala 11', 58' (pen.); Locatelli (yellow card) 68'; Chiesa 74'; Morata 82'; Kulusevski (yellow card) 89'	Report	Bonucci 26' (o.g.); Lovren (yellow card) 54'; Azmoun 90+2'	Stadium: Juventus Stadium; Attendance: 20,053; Referee: Alejandro Hernández Hernández (Spain)

23 November 2021 5	Malmö FF (Sweden)	1–1	(Russia) Zenit St.Petersburg	Malmö
23:00 MSK (UTC+3)	Rieks 28' (yellow card) 90'; Dahlin (yellow card) 50'; Ahmedhodžić (yellow card) 56'; Moisander (yellow card) 74'	Report	Claudinho (yellow card) 36'; Dzyuba (penalty missed) 52'; Wendel (yellow card) 55'; Chistyakov (yellow card) 62' (yellow-red card) 86'; Rakitskyi 90+2' (pen.)	Stadium: Eleda Stadion; Attendance: 15,520; Referee: Andris Treimanis (Latvia)

8 December 2021 6	Zenit St.Petersburg (Russia)	3–3	(England) Chelsea	Saint Petersburg
20:45 MSK (UTC+3)	Claudinho 38'; Azmoun 41'; Lovren (yellow card) 60'; Ozdoyev 90+4'	Report	Werner 2', 85'; Hudson-Odoi (yellow card) 37'; Lukaku 62'	Stadium: Krestovsky Stadium; Attendance: 29,349; Referee: Serdar Gözübüyük (Netherlands)

=== UEFA Europa League ===
==== Knockout phase ====
===== Knockout round play-offs =====
The knockout round play-offs draw was held on 13 December 2021.

17 February 2022 First leg	Zenit St.Petersburg (Russia)	2–3	(Spain) Real Betis	Saint Petersburg, Russia
18:45 CET (UTC+1)	Rakitskyi (yellow card) 7'; Dzyuba 25'; Malcom 28'; Barrios (yellow card) 90+2'	Report	Rodríguez 8'; Willian José 18'; Guardado 41'; Tello (yellow card) 75'	Stadium: Krestovsky Stadium; Referee: Benoît Bastien (France)

24 February 2022 Second leg	Real Betis (Spain)	0–0 (3–2 agg.)	(Russia) Zenit St.Petersburg	Seville, Spain
21:00 CET (UTC+1)	Rodríguez (yellow card) 28'	Report	Krugovoy (yellow card) 42'; Barrios (yellow card) 55'; Yerokhin (yellow card) 90+1'	Stadium: Estadio Benito Villamarín; Referee: Halil Umut Meler (Turkey)

== Squad statistics ==
As of match played 21 May 2022

=== Appearances and goals ===
No.	Pos	Nat	Player	Total		Premier League		Russian Cup		Super Cup		Champions League		Europa League	
No.	Pos	Nat	Player	Apps	Goals	Apps	Goals	Apps	Goals	Apps	Goals	Apps	Goals	Apps	Goals
1	GK	(Russia) RUS	Stanislav Kritsyuk	12	0	8	0	0	0	0	0	4	0	0	0
2	DF	(Russia) RUS	Dmitri Chistyakov	37	1	22+5	1	2	0	1	0	5	0	2	0
3	DF	(Brazil) BRA	Douglas Santos	37	1	27	0	0+2	1	1	0	5	0	2	0
4	DF	(Russia) RUS	Danil Krugovoy	36	2	12+14	2	2	0	0	0	0+6	0	1+1	0
5	MF	(Colombia) COL	Wilmar Barrios	37	0	25+2	0	1+1	0	0	0	6	0	2	0
6	DF	(Croatia) CRO	Dejan Lovren	19	0	13+1	0	0	0	0+1	0	4	0	0	0
8	MF	(Brazil) BRA	Wendel	35	4	24+1	3	1	0	1	0	6	1	2	0
9	FW	(Brazil) BRA	Yuri Alberto	15	6	9+2	4	1+1	2	0	0	0	0	1+1	0
10	FW	(Brazil) BRA	Malcom	36	10	22+2	8	0+2	0	1	0	6+1	1	2	1
11	MF	(Brazil) BRA	Claudinho	30	10	21+2	8	0	0	0	0	5	2	2	0
14	MF	(Russia) RUS	Daler Kuzyayev	29	2	21+1	0	1	0	1	1	3+1	1	1	0
15	DF	(Russia) RUS	Vyacheslav Karavayev	24	0	14+3	0	0+1	0	1	0	4	0	1	0
17	MF	(Russia) RUS	Andrei Mostovoy	38	8	10+18	5	2	2	0+1	1	1+4	0	0+2	0
19	MF	(Russia) RUS	Aleksei Sutormin	33	5	12+14	4	1+1	0	0	0	3+1	1	1	0
21	MF	(Russia) RUS	Aleksandr Yerokhin	39	8	8+20	7	2	1	0+1	0	0+6	0	0+2	0
22	FW	(Russia) RUS	Artem Dzyuba	39	13	18+10	11	1+1	1	0+1	0	3+3	0	2	1
23	DF	(Russia) RUS	Arsen Adamov	6	0	1+3	0	2	0	0	0	0	0	0	0
27	MF	(Russia) RUS	Magomed Ozdoyev	15	2	2+10	1	1	0	1	0	0+1	1	0	0
28	MF	(Kazakhstan) KAZ	Nuraly Alip	12	0	6+4	0	2	0	0	0	0	0	0	0
33	FW	(Russia) RUS	Ivan Sergeyev	15	5	7+4	4	1+1	1	0	0	0	0	0+2	0
41	GK	(Russia) RUS	Mikhail Kerzhakov	24	0	18	0	2	0	1	0	2	0	1	0
45	MF	(Russia) RUS	Dmitry Sergeyev	1	0	0+1	0	0	0	0	0	0	0	0	0
60	MF	(Russia) RUS	Kirill Stolbov	1	0	0+1	0	0	0	0	0	0	0	0	0
71	GK	(Russia) RUS	Daniil Odoyevsky	5	0	4	0	0	0	0	0	0	0	1	0
94	DF	(Russia) RUS	Danila Khotulyov	1	0	0+1	0	0	0	0	0	0	0	0	0
Players away from the club on loan:
64	MF	(Russia) RUS	Kirill Kravtsov	12	0	0+9	0	0	0	0+1	0	0+2	0	0	0
Players who left Zenit during the season:
7	FW	(Iran) IRI	Sardar Azmoun	21	10	11+4	7	0	0	1	1	3+2	2	0	0
11	FW	(Argentina) ARG	Sebastián Driussi	1	0	0	0	0	0	1	0	0	0	0	0
44	DF	(Ukraine) UKR	Yaroslav Rakitskyi	23	2	15	1	0	0	1	0	6	1	1	0
85	FW	(Russia) RUS	Daniil Kuznetsov	5	0	0+4	0	0	0	0	0	0+1	0	0	0

=== Goal scorers ===
Place	Position	Nation	Number	Name	Premier League	Russian Cup	Super Cup	Champions League	Europa League	Total
1	FW	(Russia)	22	Artem Dzyuba	11	1	0	0	1	13
2	MF	(Brazil)	11	Claudinho	8	0	0	2	0	10
2	FW	(Iran)	7	Sardar Azmoun	7	0	1	2	0	10
4	FW	(Brazil)	10	Malcom	8	0	0	0	1	9
4	MF	(Russia)	21	Aleksandr Yerokhin	7	1	1	0	0	9
6	MF	(Russia)	17	Andrei Mostovoy	5	2	0	0	0	7
7	FW	(Brazil)	9	Yuri Alberto	4	2	0	0	0	6
8	FW	(Russia)	33	Ivan Sergeyev	4	1	0	0	0	5
8	MF	(Russia)	19	Aleksei Sutormin	4	0	0	1	0	5
10	MF	(Brazil)	8	Wendel	3	0	0	1	0	4
11	DF	(Russia)	4	Danil Krugovoy	2	0	0	0	0	2
11	DF	(Ukraine)	44	Yaroslav Rakitskyi	1	0	0	1	0	2
11	MF	(Russia)	27	Magomed Ozdoyev	1	0	0	1	0	2
11	MF	(Russia)	14	Daler Kuzyayev	0	0	1	1	0	2
14	DF	(Russia)	2	Dmitri Chistyakov	1	0	0	0	0	1
14				Own goal	0	0	0	1	0	1
				TOTALS	66	8	3	10	2	89

=== Clean sheets ===
Place	Position	Nation	Number	Name	Premier League	Russian Cup	Super Cup	Champions League	Europa League	Total
1	GK	(Russia)	41	Mikhail Kerzhakov	7	1	1	1	0	10
2	GK	(Russia)	71	Daniil Odoyevsky	1	0	0	0	1	2
				TOTALS	8	1	1	1	1	12

=== Disciplinary record ===
Number	Nation	Position	Name	Premier League		Russian Cup		Super Cup		Champions League		Europa League		Total	
Number	Nation	Position	Name	Yellow card	Red card	Yellow card	Red card	Yellow card	Red card	Yellow card	Red card	Yellow card	Red card	Yellow card	Red card
2	(Russia)	DF	Dmitri Chistyakov	3	0	0	0	0	0	2	1	0	0	5	1
3	(Brazil)	DF	Douglas Santos	1	0	0	0	0	0	0	0	0	0	1	0
4	(Russia)	DF	Danil Krugovoy	2	0	0	0	0	0	0	0	1	0	3	0
5	(Colombia)	MF	Wilmar Barrios	3	0	0	0	0	0	1	0	2	0	6	0
6	(Croatia)	DF	Dejan Lovren	2	0	0	0	0	0	2	0	0	0	4	0
8	(Brazil)	MF	Wendel	5	1	0	0	0	0	1	0	0	0	6	1
9	(Brazil)	FW	Yuri Alberto	1	0	0	0	0	0	0	0	0	0	1	0
10	(Brazil)	FW	Malcom	3	0	0	0	0	0	0	0	0	0	3	0
11	(Brazil)	MF	Claudinho	3	1	0	0	0	0	1	0	0	0	4	1
14	(Russia)	MF	Daler Kuzyayev	8	1	0	0	0	0	0	0	0	0	8	1
15	(Russia)	DF	Vyacheslav Karavayev	1	0	0	0	0	0	1	0	0	0	2	0
17	(Russia)	MF	Andrei Mostovoy	1	0	0	0	1	0	0	0	0	0	2	0
19	(Russia)	MF	Aleksei Sutormin	2	0	0	0	0	0	0	0	0	0	2	0
21	(Russia)	MF	Aleksandr Yerokhin	2	0	0	0	0	0	0	0	1	0	3	0
23	(Russia)	DF	Arsen Adamov	1	0	1	0	0	0	0	0	0	0	2	0
27	(Russia)	MF	Magomed Ozdoyev	2	0	0	0	0	0	0	0	0	0	2	0
Players away on loan:
64	(Russia)	MF	Kirill Kravtsov	0	0	0	0	1	0	0	0	0	0	1	0
Players who left Zenit during the season:
7	(Iran)	FW	Sardar Azmoun	2	1	0	0	0	0	0	0	0	0	2	1
44	(Ukraine)	DF	Yaroslav Rakitskyi	4	0	0	0	0	0	1	0	1	0	6	0
			TOTALS	46	4	1	0	2	0	9	1	5	0	62	5
