= Dejan Lovren =

Croatian footballer (born 1989)

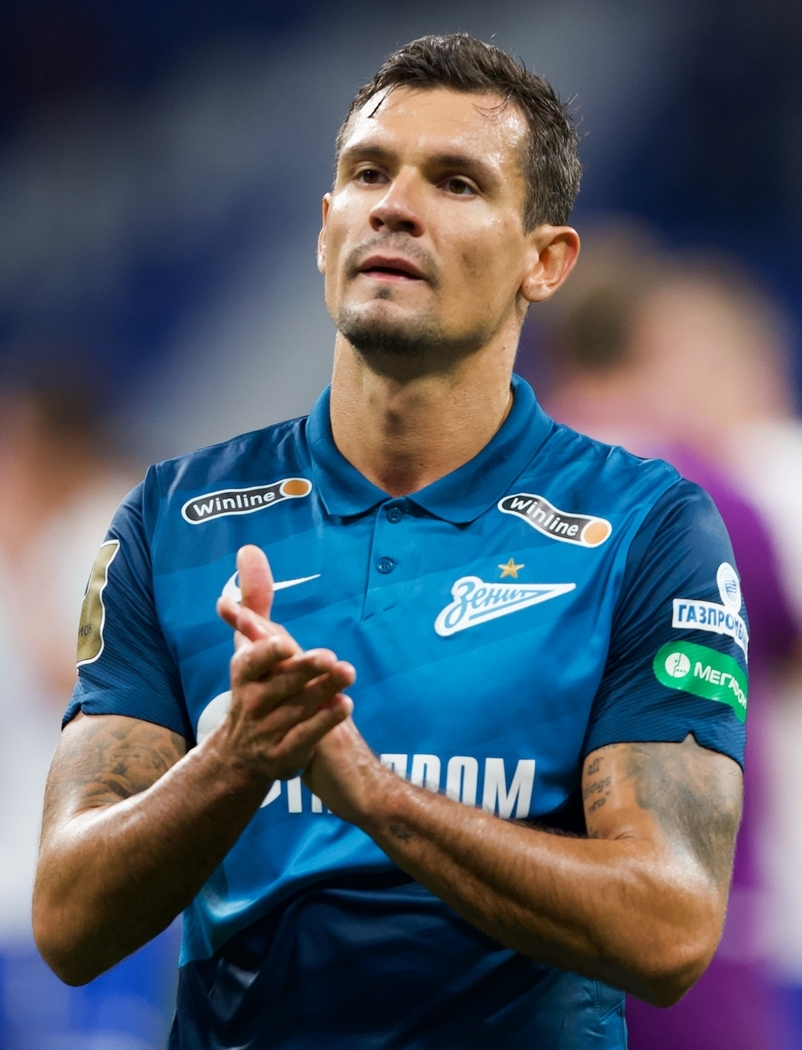
- Lovren with Zenit Saint Petersburg in 2020

Personal information
- Full name: Dejan Lovren
- Date of birth: 5 July 1989 (age 37)
- Place of birth: Zenica, SR Bosnia and Herzegovina, Yugoslavia
- Height: 1.88 m (6 ft 2 in)
- Position: Centre-back

Youth career
- 1996–1999: BSC Sendling
- 1999–2002: NK Ilovac
- 2002–2004: NK Karlovac
- 2004–2006: Dinamo Zagreb

Senior career*
Years	Team	Apps	(Gls)
2006–2010	Dinamo Zagreb	37	(1)
2006–2008	→ Inter Zaprešić (loan)	50	(1)
2010–2013	Lyon	72	(2)
2013–2014	Southampton	31	(2)
2014–2020	Liverpool	131	(5)
2020–2022	Zenit Saint Petersburg	50	(3)
2023–2024	Lyon	27	(1)
2024–2026	PAOK	22	(0)

International career
2004–2005	Croatia U17	18	(2)
2006	Croatia U18	2	(0)
2006–2008	Croatia U19	10	(1)
2007–2009	Croatia U20	5	(0)
2007–2010	Croatia U21	19	(3)
2009–2022	Croatia	78	(5)
Medal record
Men's football
Representing Croatia
FIFA World Cup
Runner-up	2018 Russia
Third place	2022 Qatar
- * Club domestic league appearances and goals as of 9 June 2026

Dejan Lovren (Croatian pronunciation: [dějan lǒvren]; born 5 July 1989) is a Croatian professional footballer who plays as a centre-back.

Lovren began his career at Dinamo Zagreb before moving to Lyon in January 2010. He spent three and a half seasons with the Ligue 1 team and won the 2012 Coupe de France before he signed for Southampton in 2013. After one season with Southampton, he joined Liverpool for £20 million. He went on to make 185 appearances for the club, winning the UEFA Champions League in 2019 and the Premier League in 2020, before joining Russian champions Zenit Saint Petersburg in July 2020. Within four months, he became the captain of the team, replacing Artem Dzyuba. He then returned to Lyon in January 2023, where he appeared 29 times for the side before departing to join PAOK in Greece in 2024.

A product of Croatia's youth levels, Lovren played for the senior team between 2009 and 2023 in 78 matches. He represented his nation for the FIFA World Cup in 2014, 2018 and 2022, winning two World Cup medals in the latter two tournaments. Lovren similarly played in UEFA Euro 2020 and UEFA Nations League.

== Early life ==
Dejan Lovren was born on 5 July 1989 to Bosnian Croat parents Silva (née Trgovčević) and Saša Lovren in Zenica, SR Bosnia and Herzegovina and spent his first years of life in the nearby village of Kraljeva Sutjeska. The family was displaced from their home due to the Bosnian War when Lovren was three years old; they eventually settled in Munich.

His family eventually had to leave as they did not possess necessary documentation to reside in Germany and settled in Karlovac, Croatia, 50 kilometres southwest of the capital city of Zagreb. Lovren stated that he initially found settling in Croatia difficult.

== Club career ==
=== Dinamo Zagreb ===
Lovren first played football in Germany with Munich-based BSC Sendling. After moving to Croatia, he played for local teams NK Ilovac and NK Karlovac as a youth before joining NK Dinamo Zagreb in 2004.

On 10 May 2006, he made his debut for Dinamo in a Prva HNL match against NK Varteks. On 17 July 2006, Lovren was loaned to NK Inter Zaprešić for two seasons where he made 50 league appearances and scored one goal. Following his return from loan Lovren regularly featured in Dinamo's starting XI, appearing in 38 matches throughout the 2008–09 season and scoring three goals. In the 2009–10 season, he featured in all four of Dinamo's UEFA Champions League qualifiers against Pyunik Yerevan and Red Bull Salzburg, and managed to score a header against Pyunik.

=== Lyon ===
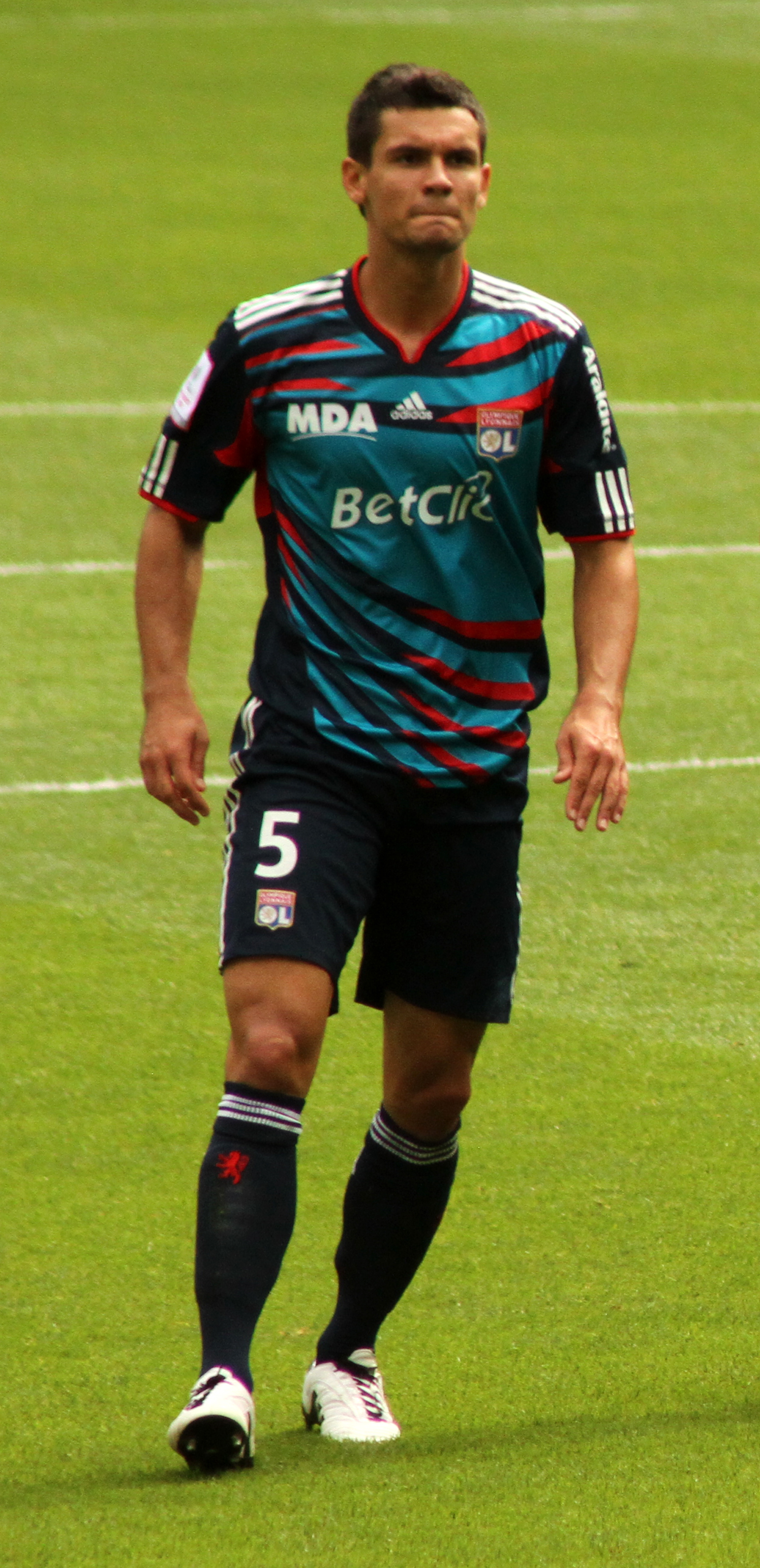
Lovren playing for Lyon in 2010

In January 2010, Lovren signed for French Ligue 1 club Olympique Lyonnais for €8 million plus €1.5 million in incentives on a four-and-a-half-year contract. He made his competitive debut on 24 January 2010 in their 2–1 defeat to AS Monaco in the Coupe de France, playing the full match. His Ligue 1 debut came on 31 January in Lyon's 2–1 win at home against Paris Saint-Germain, once again playing the full 90 minutes. During the second half of the season, he made 10 appearances, mostly as a substitute. He was not allowed to participate in Lyon's matches in the UEFA Champions League that season as he had already played in the competition for Dinamo Zagreb.

Lovren's playing time increased during the 2010–11 season following the departure of two other defenders, Jean-Alain Boumsong and Mathieu Bodmer, in the summer of 2010. During the season, he gradually established himself as a first team regular starter, playing as a centre-back alongside Cris as well as being used as a right or left full-back, demonstrating himself as a versatile defender. In November 2010 Lovren was listed in the Don Balón list of the 100 best young players in the world.

On 23 January 2012, Lovren extended his contract with Lyon for two more seasons, signing with the French club until 2016. He started for Lyon in the 2012 Coupe de France Final, a 1–0 win over Quevilly, but was substituted after 18 minutes for Bakary Koné.

=== Southampton ===
On 14 June 2013, Lovren signed for Southampton on a four-year contract for an undisclosed fee, which was estimated at £8.5 million. He made his debut on 17 August 2013, in a 1–0 win against West Bromwich Albion. He scored his first goal for Southampton against Liverpool at Anfield on 21 September 2013, a goal which proved to be the winner. On 19 October, he assisted Adam Lallana for the equalising goal against Manchester United in a 1–1 draw at Old Trafford. He added a second league goal in a 2–2 away draw against Sunderland on 18 January 2014, but was stretchered off late in the game and required hospital treatment after the match. On 23 January, it was announced that along with midfielder Gastón Ramírez, Lovren would be out for six-to-eight weeks with ankle ligament damage.

At the conclusion of his first season in the Premier League, Lovren was named in Bloomberg Sports' Power 50 list, which provides statistical rankings of performances from players in Europe's top five leagues. He was the fifth-highest ranked player from the Premier League in 31st position. After much speculation regarding Lovren's future following the departures of Adam Lallana, Luke Shaw and Rickie Lambert from Southampton, Liverpool Echo reported on 25 July 2014 that Southampton had agreed a fee with Liverpool for the sale of Lovren, who was set to undergo a medical at the Merseyside club after reportedly handing in a transfer request at Southampton.

=== Liverpool ===
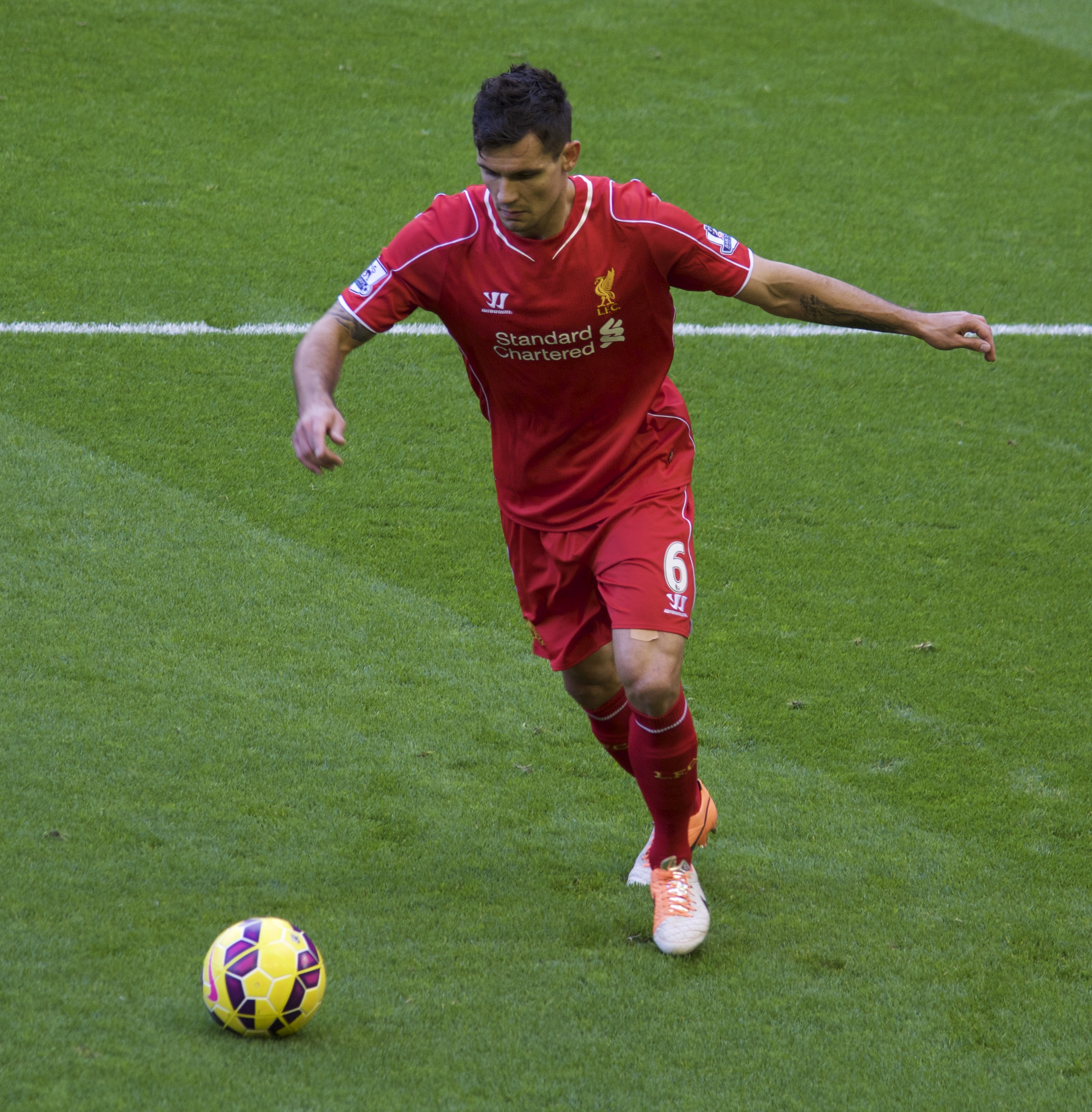
Lovren preparing to pass for Liverpool in 2014

On 27 July 2014, Lovren became the third Southampton player that transfer window to join Liverpool, after Rickie Lambert and Adam Lallana. He signed a four-year deal for a reported fee of £20 million, becoming the most expensive defender in Liverpool's history until Virgil van Dijk joined the club in 2018.

On 10 August 2014 he made his debut in a friendly for Liverpool against Borussia Dortmund at Anfield, scoring the second goal in a 4–0 victory, and made his competitive debut on 17 August in the club's opening game of the Premier League season, playing the full 90 minutes in a 2–1 win over former club Southampton at Anfield. He scored his first official goal for Liverpool on 28 October, when he headed in the game-winner from a free-kick in a fourth round League Cup 2–1 victory over Swansea City. However, following his poor performance in a Champions League defeat to Basel, Lovren was dropped from the first team. As the last penalty taker, Lovren put his attempt over the crossbar as Liverpool lost in a penalty shootout to Beşiktaş on 26 February 2015 as they were eliminated from the last 32 of the Europa League. The Telegraph website included Lovren in a feature about the 2014–15 Premier League's 20 worst signings which remarked on the number of his errors that resulted in opposition goals.

Lovren regained his place in the lineup for the first three games of the 2015–16 season and performed well securing three clean sheets and seven points. However, following a pair of defeats to West Ham United and rivals Manchester United in which the defence conceded six goals, Lovren again lost his place to Mamadou Sakho. On 8 November he came on as a substitute for Sakho in a 2–1 defeat to Crystal Palace at Anfield, with Sakho sustaining a knee injury that ruled him out for two months. On 13 December, in a 2–2 draw against West Bromwich Albion, Lovren was stretchered off the pitch in the 79th minute due to injury and was replaced by Divock Origi. The following 14 April, Lovren scored a stoppage-time winning goal in a 4–3 Europa League quarter-final win over Borussia Dortmund. Having endured a difficult start to his career at Liverpool, by the end of the 2015–16 season under Jürgen Klopp, Lovren was described as having transformed into a "calm and composed" leader on the pitch by Liverpool Echo.

On 28 April 2017, Lovren extended his contract with Liverpool, until 2021.

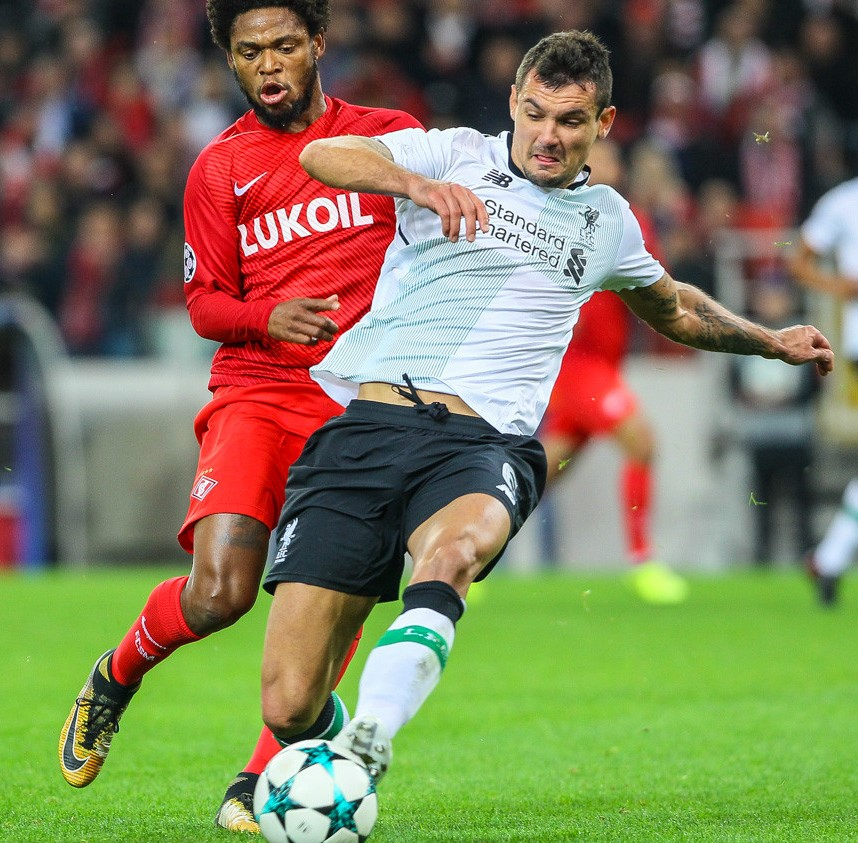
Lovren (in white) playing for Liverpool in 2017

He had a rocky start to the 2017–18 season, being at fault for Harry Kane and Son Heung-min's early goals as Tottenham Hotspur defeated Liverpool 4–1 on 22 October 2017. He was substituted for Alex Oxlade-Chamberlain after only half an hour. On 17 December, Lovren scored his first goal of the season in a 4–0 win over Bournemouth; a result which saw Liverpool become the first team in Premier League history to win four consecutive away league matches by a margin of at least three goals. After Virgil van Dijk's arrival on 1 January, he and Lovren built a steady partnership at the heart of Liverpool's defence. On 14 January 2018, Lovren captained Liverpool for the first time in a 4–3 win against Manchester City. On 13 May, Lovren scored his second goal of the season in a 4–0 win over Brighton and Hove Albion, which secured Liverpool's qualification for the Champions League next season. Lovren, as well, played a significant role in Liverpool's Champions League run, where the team reached the final, but eventually lost it to the ruling champions Real Madrid.

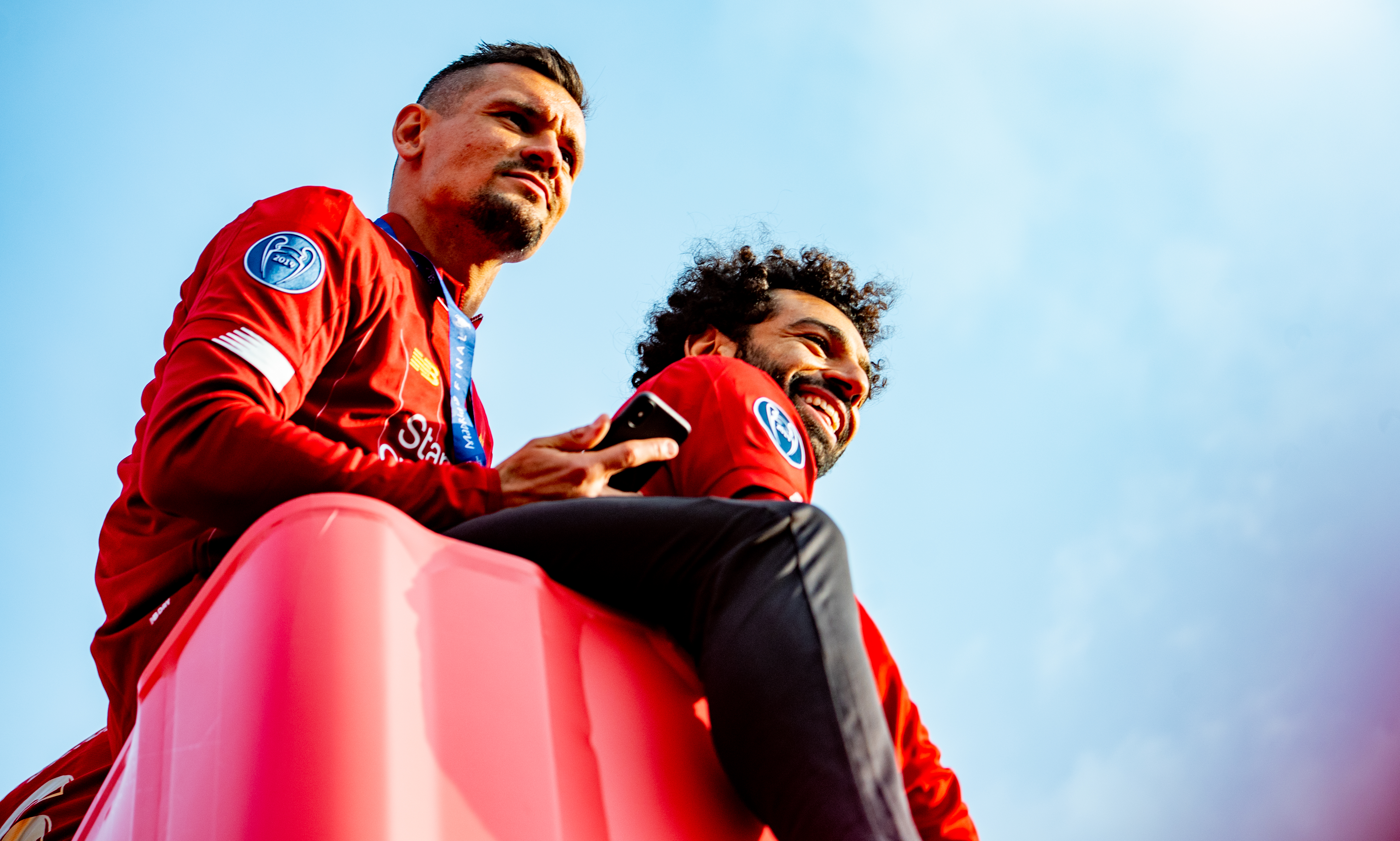
Lovren celebrating victory in the UEFA Champions League with teammate Mohammed Salah.

Lovren entered the 2018–19 season injured following that summer's World Cup. He returned to the squad for an EFL Cup match against Chelsea that Liverpool lost 1–2. On 26 December, he scored the opening goal in the 4–0 win over Newcastle United. During the match against Manchester City on 3 January 2019, Lovren made a crucial error that lead to Sergio Agüero's opening goal. Liverpool lost the match 2–1 and ending their unbeaten run in the Premier League. Six minutes into the FA Cup game against Wolverhampton Wanderers on 7 January, Lovren got injured and substituted for Ki-Jana Hoever. He subsequently lost his spot in the starting eleven playing only two full games for the remainder of the season, as Liverpool lost the Premier League by a single point behind eventual champions Manchester City and won the 2019 UEFA Champions League Final against Tottenham Hotspur where he remained an unused substitute. He became the tenth Croatian in history to win the Champions League.

During the summer 2019, Lovren demanded a transfer since he did not want to be a substitute. The strongest interest was expressed by Serie A clubs Milan and Roma. He was therefore left out of the squad for 2019 UEFA Super Cup, which Liverpool won beating Chelsea on penalties. Lovren returned to the squad for an EFL Cup match against MK Dons on 25 September. He went on to solidify his spot in the starting XI following Joël Matip's injury. On 27 November, he scored the equalizer in the Champions League group stage match against Napoli, that ended as a 1–1 draw. However, on 10 December, he suffered a knee injury in a game against Red Bull Salzburg and was substituted for Joe Gomez. The injury forced him to miss the 2019 FIFA Club World Cup, which Liverpool won beating Flamengo 1–0 in the final. He returned on 26 January 2020 and captained the team in an FA Cup game against Shrewsbury Town that ended as a 2–2 draw. On 25 June, Lovren became the first Croatian to win a Premier League after Liverpool finished first place in the 2019–20 Premier League.

=== Zenit Saint Petersburg ===
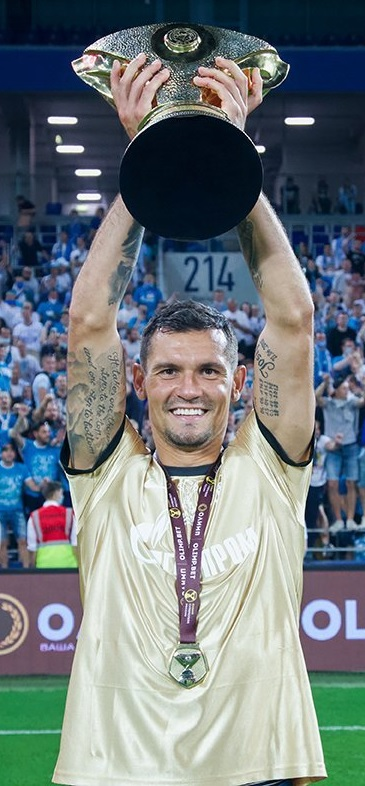
Lovren lifting the 2020 Russian Super Cup trophy with Zenit

On 27 July 2020, Lovren signed for Zenit Saint Petersburg on a three-year contract for €12 million after a six-year spell with Liverpool. He debuted for Zenit on 7 August in the 2020 Russian Super Cup against Lokomotiv Moscow. The match ended as a 2–1 victory for Zenit, meaning that Lovren won his first trophy with the club in his first game. He made his league debut on 11 August, in a 0–2 win over Rotor Volgograd. Four days later, he scored his first goal for Zenit in a 0–2 victory over Rostov.

On 20 October, in his Champions League debut for the club, he took a shot from outside of the penalty area which deflected off Ethan Horvath's back into the net, as Zenit lost 1–2 to Club Brugge. On 8 November, Lovren captained Zenit for the first time in a match against Krasnodar, due to Artem Dzyuba being stripped off captaincy after an explicit video depicting him masturbating leaked and went viral. In the closing minutes of the game, he won a penalty which was successfully converted by Aleksei Sutormin, as Zenit won 3–1. Ahead of Zenit's league match against Sochi, played on 11 April 2021, Lovren suffered a muscle injury in training. In his absence, on 2 May, Zenit won the league title after thrashing Lokomotiv Moscow 6–1.

Lovren started the 2021–22 season by winning another Super Cup, beating Lokomotiv Moscow 3–0 on 17 July. Due to injuries, he made only 19 appearances during the first half of the season, as Zenit won the league once again.

=== Return to Lyon ===
On 2 January 2023, Lovren returned to France to re-join Lyon on a two-and-a-half-year contract, almost ten years after he had first left the club.

=== PAOK ===
On 16 September 2024, Lovren joined Super League club PAOK on a two-year deal.

== International career ==
Lovren made 54 appearances and scored six goals for various Croatian youth national teams. He received his first call-up to Croatia national team in August 2009 by manager Slaven Bilić, who included the player in his match squad against Belarus. Lovren was an unused substitute, but still was reportedly delighted with the new experience. He made his debut against Qatar on 8 November 2009, coming on as a substitute for Danijel Pranjić.

On 2 September 2011, Lovren scored his first international goal, against Malta in a UEFA Euro 2012 qualifying match. He was included by manager Slaven Bilić in the training camp prior to the UEFA Euro 2012 but was not selected for the final squad because of an injury. Lovren scored his second goal for Croatia on 26 March 2013 in a World Cup qualifying match against Wales at the Liberty Stadium in Swansea. It was an equalizer that leveled the match after Gareth Bale had given Wales the lead from a penalty which Lovren caused. Croatia eventually won the game 1–2.

In May 2014, Lovren was named in manager Niko Kovač's provisional 30-man squad for the 2014 FIFA World Cup in Brazil. In the opening match of the tournament, on 12 June against the hosts Brazil in São Paulo, Lovren was judged by the Japanese referee Yuichi Nishimura to have fouled Fred in the 69th minute when the score was 1–1. A controversial penalty was given, which was converted by Neymar and led to Brazil's eventual 3–1 win. He was featured in the other two group stage matches as Croatia crashed out of the tournament following a 1–3 defeat to Mexico.

Lovren's deteriorating relationship with manager Ante Čačić ultimately resulted in him being left out of Croatia's squad for the UEFA Euro 2016.

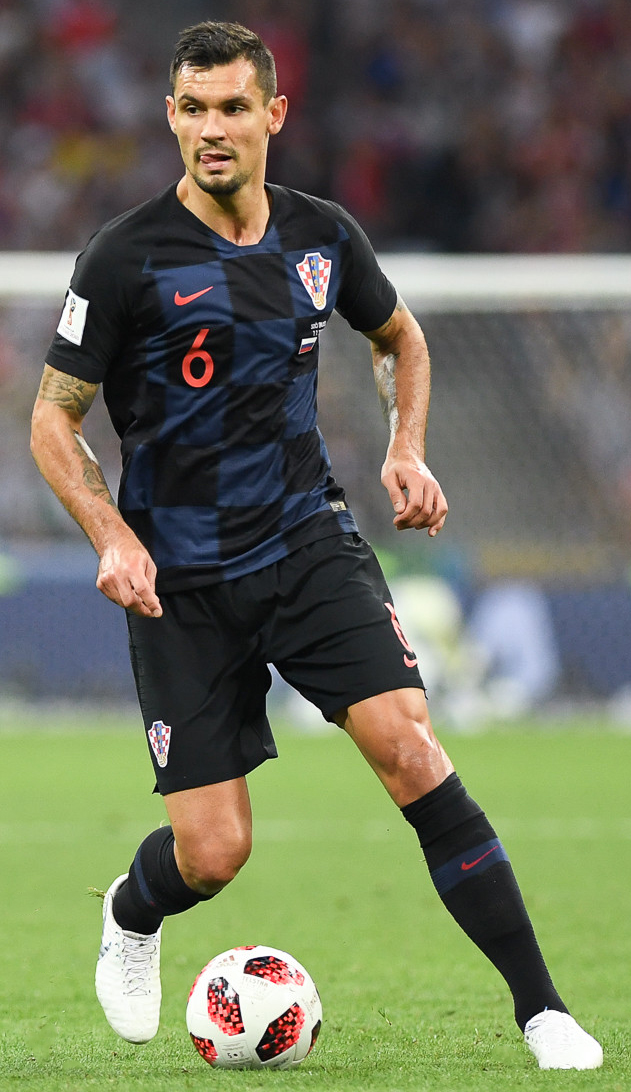
Lovren playing for Croatia at the 2018 FIFA World Cup

In May 2018, he was named in Zlatko Dalić's 23-man squad for the 2018 FIFA World Cup in Russia. In the final group stage match against Iceland, after Croatia had already qualified for the knockout stage, his handball in the penalty box caused a penalty that was converted successfully by Gylfi Sigurðsson for 1–1. Despite that, Croatia won the match 1–2 and topped their group. He then featured throughout the competition as Croatia reached the final where they lost to France 4–2.

On 11 September, Lovren missed Croatia's debut match in the inaugural edition of UEFA's new tournament Nations League, the team's 6–0 historical defeat to Spain, due to injury. He came back a month later for a match against England, that ended up as a goalless draw. On 15 November, he took part in Spain's 3–2 defeat. After the match, Lovren sparked controversy after calling the Spain team "a bunch of pussies" on Instagram Live and admitting that he deliberately elbowed Spain's defender Sergio Ramos, whom he had a feud in the media with prior to the match. Three days later, Croatia suffered a 1–2 defeat to England and got relegated from the League A to the League B of the next edition of the Nations League.

On 11 January 2019, UEFA banned Lovren for one international match for disrespecting the Spain national team and their flag, and the deliberate elbowing of Ramos. He could not play in the UEFA Euro 2020 qualifying match against Azerbaijan. He scored his third international goal on 6 September in a 0–4 win over Slovakia. However, his errors in the away fixtures against Azerbaijan and Wales caused Croatia to drop four points and delayed the team's qualification for the tournament. He was suspended for the deciding home fixture against Slovakia as well due to three yellow cards. Croatia nevertheless won the match 3–1 and secured their spot at the Euros.

In his first ever appearance at a UEFA European Championship, a 1–1 draw with the Czech Republic on 18 June 2021, Lovren elbowed Patrik Schick and caused a penalty that Schick successfully converted.

At the 2022 FIFA World Cup, Lovren played all the matches except the third place play-off, which Croatia won.

On 23 February 2023, Lovren announced his retirement from international football, ending his 14-year career with the national team with 78 appearances won.

== Personal life ==
Lovren's younger brother Davor is also a professional footballer who currently is a free agent after playing for Kustošija. Lovren was named by his grandmother Ivanka after the Montenegrin football legend Dejan Savićević. He speaks Croatian, German, English and French.

Lovren is married to Anita Sekulić and the couple have two children, Elena, born in August 2012, and Josip, born in June 2015.

In 2013, Lovren founded a fashion brand Russell Brown with his best man Lovro Krčar. Three years after, the brand was shut down for unknown reasons. Rumours suggest that the reason for the closure was due to a poor relationship between Lovren and Krčar. In May 2018, he founded another brand Rock Filius. On 29 May 2018, Lovren opened a four star hotel Joel in Novalja, near Zrće. Lovren has stated that the hotel is named after Josip and Elena. On 29 December 2020, Lovren offered free temporary accommodation in the hotel for sixteen families who had lost their homes in the 2020 Petrinja earthquake.

During 2014 FIFA World Cup in Brazil, paparazzi leaked explicit photos of several Croatian internationals taking a "skinny dip" in the pool of a Brazilian hotel. Lovren reportedly suffered the most since almost his entire body was exposed.

He made a cameo appearance in Jakov Sedlar's 2021 film The Match, alongside Croatia teammate Mateo Kovačić.

=== Social views ===
In February 2017, LFC TV released a short documentary Lovren: My Life as a Refugee where the footballer opened up about his experiences, tough life and traumas and asked for more tolerance for refugees saying:

When I see what's happening today [with refugees] I just remember my thing, my family and how people don't want you in their country. I understand people want to protect themselves, but people don't have homes. It's not their fault; they're fighting for their lives just to save their kids. They want a secure place for their kids and their futures. I went through all this and I know what some families are going through. Give them a chance, give them a chance. You can see who the good people are and who are not.

On 2 April 2022, following a statement from Disney that they would increase diversity and inclusion in their work, particularly LGBT content—Lovren took to Twitter (now X) to announce that he cancelled his Disney+ subscription, and called for a boycott of the company.

== Career statistics ==
=== Club ===
As of match played 10 April 2025

Appearances and goals by club, season and competition
Club	Season	League			National cup (Note: Includes Croatian Cup, Coupe de France, FA Cup, Russian Cup)		League cup (Note: Includes Coupe de la Ligue, Football League/EFL Cup)		Europe		Other		Total	
Club	Season	Division	Apps	Goals	Apps	Goals	Apps	Goals	Apps	Goals	Apps	Goals	Apps	Goals
Dinamo Zagreb	2005–06	Prva HNL	1	0	0	0	—		0	0	—		1	0
Dinamo Zagreb	2008–09	Prva HNL	22	1	8	1	—		8 (Note: Three appearances in UEFA Champions League, five appearances and one goal in UEFA Cup)	1	—		38	3
Dinamo Zagreb	2009–10	Prva HNL	14	0	4	0	—		11 (Note: Four appearances and one goal in UEFA Champions League, seven appearances in UEFA Europa League)	1	—		29	1
Dinamo Zagreb	Total		37	1	12	1	—		19	2	—		68	4
Inter Zaprešić (loan)	2006–07	Druga HNL	21	0	4	0	—		—		—		25	0
Inter Zaprešić (loan)	2007–08	Prva HNL	29	1	2	0	—		—		—		31	1
Inter Zaprešić (loan)	Total		50	1	6	0	—		—		—		56	1
Lyon	2009–10	Ligue 1	8	0	1	0	1	0	0	0	—		10	0
Lyon	2010–11	Ligue 1	28	0	2	0	1	0	6 (Note: Appearances in UEFA Champions League)	1	—		37	1
Lyon	2011–12	Ligue 1	18	1	3	0	2	0	8	0	—		31	1
Lyon	2012–13	Ligue 1	18	1	0	0	1	0	5 (Note: Appearances in UEFA Europa League)	0	0	0	24	1
Lyon	Total		72	2	6	0	5	0	19	1	—		102	3
Southampton	2013–14	Premier League	31	2	0	0	0	0	—		—		31	2
Liverpool	2014–15	Premier League	26	0	4	0	2	1	6 (Note: Four appearances in UEFA Champions League, two appearances in UEFA Europa League)	0	—		38	1
Liverpool	2015–16	Premier League	24	0	1	0	4	0	10	1	—		39	1
Liverpool	2016–17	Premier League	29	2	0	0	3	0	—		—		32	2
Liverpool	2017–18	Premier League	29	2	0	0	0	0	14	0	—		43	2
Liverpool	2018–19	Premier League	13	1	1	0	1	0	3	0	—		18	1
Liverpool	2019–20	Premier League	10	0	1	0	1	0	3	1	0	0	15	1
Liverpool	Total		131	5	7	0	11	1	36	2	—		185	8
Zenit Saint Petersburg	2020–21	Russian Premier League	21	2	1	0	—		5	0	1 (Note: Appearances in Russian Super Cup)	0	28	2
Zenit Saint Petersburg	2021–22	Russian Premier League	14	0	0	0	—		4	0	1	0	19	0
Zenit Saint Petersburg	2022–23	Russian Premier League	15	1	1	0	—		—		0	0	16	1
Zenit Saint Petersburg	Total		50	3	2	0	—		9	0	2	0	63	3
Lyon	2022–23	Ligue 1	17	1	4	0	—		—		—		21	1
Lyon	2023–24	Ligue 1	10	0	1	0	—		—		—		11	0
Lyon	Total		27	1	5	0	—		—		—		32	1
PAOK	2024–25	Super League Greece	7	0	2	0	—		—		—		9	0
PAOK	2025–26	Super League Greece	12	0	0	0							12	0
Career total			410	15	38	1	16	1	83	5	2	0	549	22

=== International ===
Appearances and goals by national team and year
National team	Year	Apps	Goals
Croatia	2009	2	0
Croatia	2010	3	0
Croatia	2011	8	1
Croatia	2012	1	0
Croatia	2013	9	1
Croatia	2014	7	0
Croatia	2015	0	0
Croatia	2016	1	0
Croatia	2017	6	0
Croatia	2018	13	0
Croatia	2019	7	1
Croatia	2020	5	1
Croatia	2021	8	0
Croatia	2022	8	1
Total		78	5

Croatia score listed first, score column indicates score after each Lovren goal.

List of international goals scored by Dejan Lovren
No.	Date	Venue	Cap	Opponent	Score	Result	Competition
1	2 September 2011	National Stadium, Ta' Qali, Malta	10	Malta	3–1	3–1	UEFA Euro 2012 qualification
2	26 March 2013	Liberty Stadium, Swansea, Wales	17	Wales	1–1	2–1	2014 FIFA World Cup qualification
3	6 September 2019	Anton Malatinský Stadium, Trnava, Slovakia	54	Slovakia	4–0	4–0	UEFA Euro 2020 qualification
4	8 September 2020	Stade de France, Saint-Denis, France	59	France	1–0	2–4	2020–21 UEFA Nations League A
5	25 September 2022	Ernst-Happel-Stadion, Vienna, Austria	71	Austria	3–1	3–1	2022–23 UEFA Nations League A

== Honours ==
Inter Zaprešić

- Druga HNL: 2006–07

Dinamo Zagreb

- Prva HNL: 2008–09
- Croatian Cup: 2008–09

Lyon

- Coupe de France: 2011–12; runner-up: 2023–24

Liverpool

- Premier League: 2019–20
- UEFA Champions League: 2018–19; runner-up: 2017–18
- UEFA Europa League runner-up: 2015–16
- FA Community Shield runner-up: 2019

Zenit Saint Petersburg

- Russian Premier League: 2020–21, 2021–22, 2022–23
- Russian Super Cup: 2020, 2021

Croatia

- FIFA World Cup runner-up: 2018; third place: 2022

=== Individual ===
- Liverpool Player of the Month :December 2015October 2017
- FIFA FIFPro World XI 4th Team : 2018

Orders

- Order of Duke Branimir: 2018
