= Claudinho (footballer, born 1997) =

Brazilian footballer

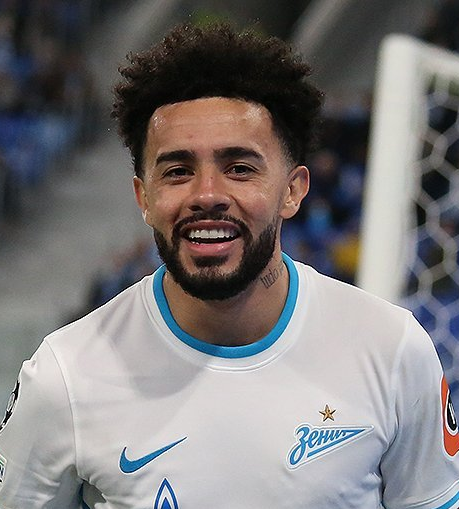
- Claudinho with Zenit Saint Petersburg in 2021

Personal information
- Full name: Cláudio Luiz Rodrigues Parise Leonel
- Date of birth: 28 January 1997 (age 29)
- Place of birth: Guarulhos, Brazil
- Height: 1.72 m (5 ft 8 in)
- Positions: Attacking midfielder; forward

Team information
- Current team: Al Sadd
- Number: 33

Youth career
- 2003–2015: Santos
- 2015–2016: Corinthians

Senior career*
| Years | Team | Apps | (Gls) |
| 2015–2017 | Corinthians | 1 | (0) |
| 2016 | → Bragantino (loan) | 18 | (0) |
| 2017 | → Santo André (loan) | 16 | (4) |
| 2017–2019 | Ponte Preta | 16 | (0) |
| 2018 | → Red Bull Brasil (loan) | 12 | (1) |
| 2018 | → Oeste (loan) | 13 | (0) |
| 2018–2019 | → Red Bull Brasil (loan) | 9 | (0) |
| 2019–2021 | Red Bull Bragantino | 99 | (32) |
| 2021–2025 | Zenit Saint Petersburg | 93 | (17) |
| 2025– | Al Sadd | 29 | (7) |

International career^{‡}
| 2021 | Brazil U23 | 9 | (0) |
Medal record
Men's football
Representing Brazil
Olympic Games
| Gold medal – first place | 2020 Tokyo | Team |
- * Club domestic league appearances and goals as of 2 October 2026 ‡ National team caps and goals as of 15:50, 7 August 2021 (UTC)

Cláudio Luiz Rodrigues Parise Leonel (Russian: Клаудио Луиз Родригес Парисе Леонел; born 28 January 1997), commonly known as Claudinho, is a Brazilian professional footballer who plays as an attacking midfielder or a forward for Qatar Stars League club Al Sadd.

== Club career ==
=== Early career ===
Born in Guarulhos, São Paulo, Claudinho moved to São Vicente at the age of 3 and joined Santos' youth setup in 2003, aged six. In July 2015, after impressing with the under-17s, he signed a professional contract with Corinthians, being initially assigned to the under-20 squad.

=== Corinthians ===
Claudinho was part of the squad that won the 2015 Campeonato Brasileiro Série A, despite never playing and only being an unused substitute. After losing the under-20s final from Flamengo in 2016 Copa São Paulo de Futebol Júnior, he made his professional debut on 19 March of that year, coming on as a second-half substitute in a 4–0 Campeonato Paulista routing of Linense at the Arena Corinthians.

==== Loans to Bragantino and Santo André ====
On 3 June 2016, Claudinho was loaned to Série B side Bragantino for the remaining of the season. He contributed with 18 matches, as the club suffered relegation.

Claudinho spent the 2017 Campeonato Paulista on loan at Santo André, scoring four goals during the competition; his first came on 12 February, as he scored the second in a 2–0 away win against his parent club Corinthians.

=== Ponte Preta ===
On 18 May 2017, Claudinho signed a two-and-a-half-year contract with Ponte Preta in the top tier, with the club acquiring 50% of his federative rights. He made his debut in the category (and for the club) ten days later, replacing Lins in a 2–2 away draw against Atlético Mineiro.

==== Loans to Red Bull Brasil and Oeste ====
On 9 January 2018, Claudinho was loaned to Red Bull Brasil for the 2018 Campeonato Paulista, where he featured regularly but scored just one goal. On 11 April, he moved to Oeste also in a temporary deal, but cut short his loan in August to return to Red Bull.

=== Red Bull Bragantino ===
On 24 April 2019, after Red Bull Brasil's merger with Bragantino to create Red Bull Bragantino, Claudinho's loan was renewed until the end of 2020. He became a key unit for the club during the 2019 Campeonato Brasileiro Série B, contributing with ten goals as the club achieved promotion as champions; in September, RB Bragantino bought the 50% of his federative rights belonging to Ponte Preta, and he signed a contract until 2023.

Claudinho was also a regular starter in the 2020 season, and scored his first Série A goal on 9 August, netting a last-minute equalizer in a 1–1 away draw against former club Santos. The following 6 January, after impressing in the league, he further extended his deal until 2024.

=== Zenit ===
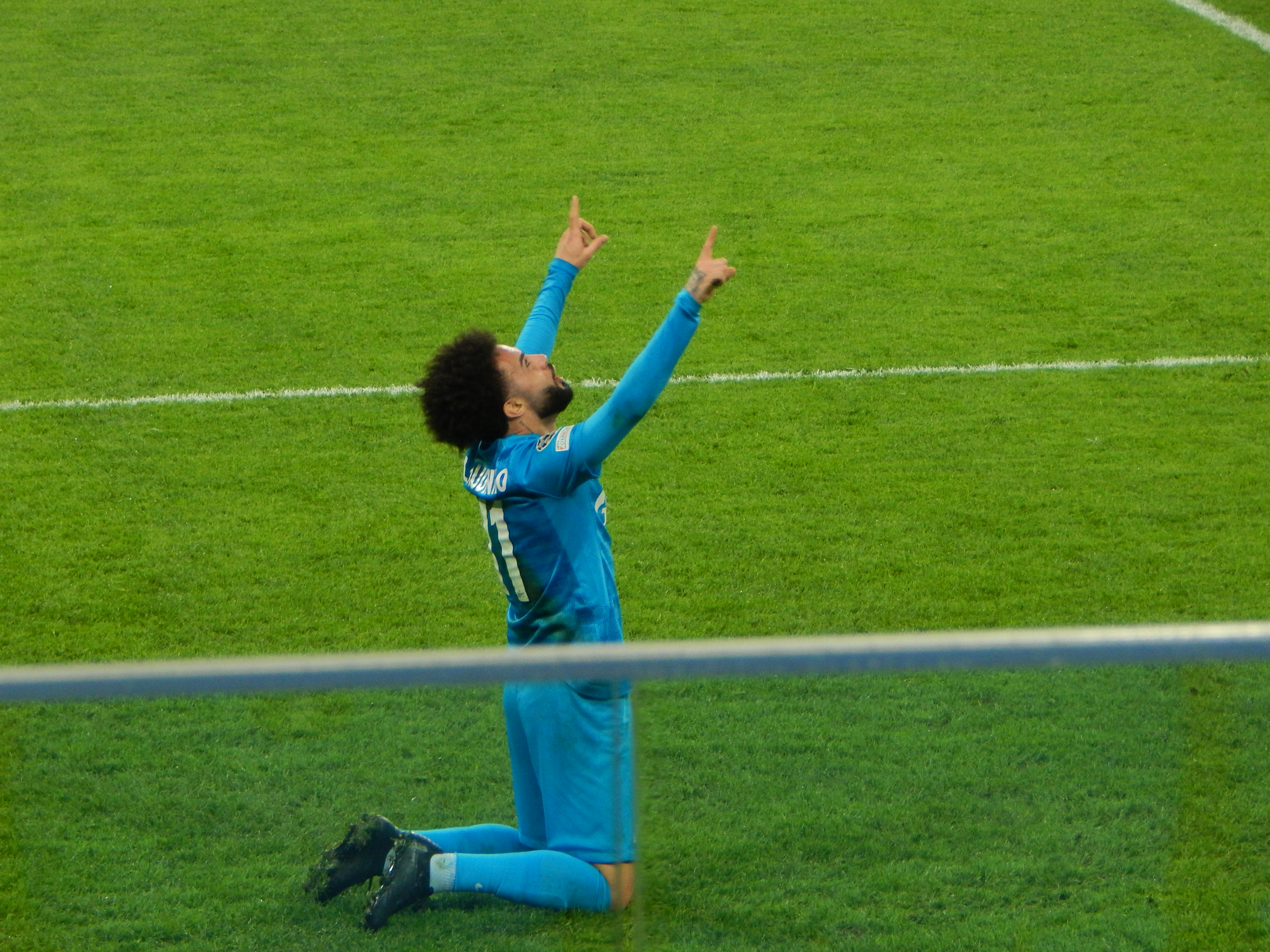
Claudinho celebrates his goal against Chelsea F.C. in 2021

On 7 August 2021, after winning the gold medal at the Tokyo Olympics with Brazil, Russian club FC Zenit Saint Petersburg announced the signing of Claudinho from RB Bragantino. On 13 August 2021, he signed a five-year contract with Zenit.

In his first season at Zenit Claudinho was elected the best player of the 2021/22 season of the Russian Championship by athletes who work in the Russian first division. He participated in 31 games, where he scored 10 goals and scored three assists.

On 22 July 2022, Claudinho extended his contract with Zenit until 2027. In August 2024, he extended his contract with Zenit to June 2028.

=== Al Sadd ===
On 22 January 2025, Zenit announced Claudinho's transfer to Al Sadd in Qatar.

== International career ==
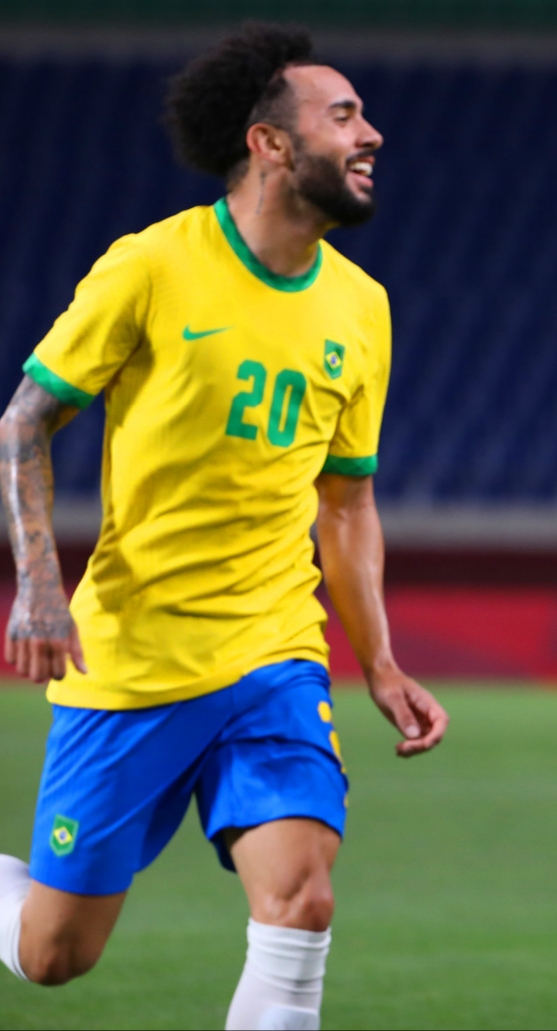
Claudinho at the 2020 Summer Olympics

On 17 June 2021, Claudinho was named in the Brazil squad for the 2020 Summer Olympics.

== Personal life ==
On 24 February 2023, Claudinho acquired Russian citizenship.

== Career statistics ==
As of match played 7 December 2024

Appearances and goals by club, season and competition
| Club | Season | League | | | State League | | National cup (Note: Includes Copa do Brasil, Russian Cup) | | Continental | | Other | | Total | |
| Club | Season | Division | Apps | Goals | Apps | Goals | Apps | Goals | Apps | Goals | Apps | Goals | Apps | Goals |
|---|---|---|---|---|---|---|---|---|---|---|---|---|---|---|
| Corinthians | 2016 | Série A | 0 | 0 | 1 | 0 | 0 | 0 | 0 | 0 | — | | 1 | 0 |
| Bragantino (loan) | 2016 | Série B | 18 | 0 | — | | 2 | 0 | — | | — | | 20 | 0 |
| Santo André (loan) | 2017 | Paulista | — | | 16 | 4 | 1 | 0 | — | | — | | 17 | 4 |
| Ponte Preta | 2017 | Série A | 16 | 0 | — | | 0 | 0 | 4 (Note: Appearance(s) in Copa Sudamericana) | 0 | — | | 20 | 0 |
| Red Bull Brasil (loan) | 2018 | Paulista | — | | 12 | 1 | — | | — | | — | | 12 | 1 |
| Oeste (loan) | 2018 | Série B | 13 | 0 | — | | — | | — | | — | | 13 | 0 |
| Red Bull Brasil (loan) | 2018 | Paulista | — | | — | | — | | — | | 15 (Note: Appearance(s) in Copa Paulista) | 3 | 15 | 3 |
| Red Bull Brasil (loan) | 2019 | Paulista | — | | 9 | 0 | — | | — | | — | | 9 | 0 |
| Red Bull Brasil (loan) | Total | | — | | 9 | 0 | — | | — | | 15 | 3 | 24 | 3 |
| Red Bull Bragantino | 2019 | Série B | 34 | 10 | — | | — | | — | | — | | 34 | 10 |
| Red Bull Bragantino | 2020 | Série A | 35 | 18 | 13 | 2 | 2 | 0 | — | | — | | 50 | 20 |
| Red Bull Bragantino | 2021 | Série A | 5 | 0 | 12 | 2 | 2 | 1 | 6 | 0 | — | | 25 | 3 |
| Red Bull Bragantino | Total | | 74 | 28 | 25 | 4 | 4 | 1 | 6 | 0 | — | | 109 | 33 |
| Zenit Saint Petersburg | 2021–22 | Premier Liga | 23 | 8 | — | | 0 | 0 | 8 (Note: Six appearances, two goals in UEFA Champions League; two appearances in UEFA Europa League) | 2 | — | | 31 | 10 |
| Zenit Saint Petersburg | 2022–23 | Premier Liga | 24 | 5 | — | | 5 | 0 | — | | 1 (Note: Appearance in the Russian Super Cup) | 0 | 30 | 5 |
| Zenit Saint Petersburg | 2023–24 | Premier Liga | 30 | 4 | — | | 12 | 1 | — | | 1 | 0 | 43 | 5 |
| Zenit Saint Petersburg | 2024–25 | Premier Liga | 16 | 0 | — | | 3 | 1 | – | | 1 | 0 | 20 | 1 |
| Zenit Saint Petersburg | Total | | 93 | 17 | — | | 20 | 2 | 8 | 2 | 3 | 0 | 124 | 21 |
| Career total | | | 214 | 45 | 63 | 9 | 27 | 3 | 18 | 2 | 18 | 3 | 340 | 62 |

== Honours ==
Corinthians

- Campeonato Brasileiro Série A: 2015

Bragantino

- Campeonato Brasileiro Série B: 2019

Zenit Saint Petersburg

- Russian Premier League: 2021–22, 2022–23, 2023–24
- Russian Cup: 2023–24
- Russian Super Cup: 2022, 2023, 2024

Al Sadd

- Qatar Stars League: 2024–25

Brazil U23

- Summer Olympics: 2020

Individual

- Best Attacking Midfielder in Brazil: 2020
- Bola de Ouro: 2020
- Bola de Prata: 2020
- Campeonato Brasileiro Série A Best Player: 2020
- Campeonato Brasileiro Série A Best Newcomer: 2020
- Campeonato Brasileiro Série A Top scorer: 2020
- Campeonato Brasileiro Série A: Player of the Month: January 2021
- Campeonato Paulista Team of the Year: 2021
- Russian Premier League Player of the Month: November - December 2021
- Russian Premier League Goal of the Month: November - December 2021
- Russian Premier League Attacking Midfielder of the Season: 2021–22
- Russian Premier League Best Player (as chosen by the league): 2021–22
