= 2021–22 Russian Premier League =

30th season of top-tier football league in Russia

Russian Premier League
- Season: 2021–22
- Dates: 23 July 2021 – 21 May 2022
- Champions: Zenit Saint Petersburg
- Relegated: Ufa (through relegation play-offs); Rubin Kazan; Arsenal Tula
- Matches: 240
- Goals: 639 (2.66 per match)
- Top goalscorer: Gamid Agalarov (19 goals)
- Best goalkeeper: Igor Akinfeev
- Biggest home win: Zenit 7–1 Spartak Moscow (24 October 2021)
- Biggest away win: Rubin 0–6 Sochi (30 April 2022)
- Highest scoring: Zenit 7–1 Spartak Moscow (24 October 2021)
- Longest winning run: 6 matches CSKA Moscow
- Longest unbeaten run: 18 matches Zenit
- Longest winless run: 13 matches Arsenal Tula
- Longest losing run: 5 matches Nizhny Novgorod
- Highest attendance: 47,584; Zenit 3–1 Lokomotiv (30 April 2022)
- Lowest attendance: 409; Ufa 1–0 Akhmat Grozny (31 October 2021); Excluding the games played without fans due to the COVID-19 pandemic in Russia, including the games played with restricted attendance for the same reason
- Total attendance: 1,733,362
- Average attendance: 7,439

The 2021–22 Russian Premier League (known as the Tinkoff Russian Premier League, also written as Tinkoff Russian Premier Liga for sponsorship reason) was the 30th season of the premier football competition in Russia since the dissolution of the Soviet Union and the 20th under the current Russian Premier League name.

== Teams ==
As in the previous season, 16 teams played in the 2021–22 season. After the 2020–21 season, Rotor Volgograd were relegated to the 2021–22 Russian Football National League after one season in Premier League while Tambov were dissolved. They were replaced by Krylia Sovetov Samara and Nizhny Novgorod, the winners and third place of the 2020–21 Russian Football National League. FC Orenburg, the runner-up of 2020–21 Russian Football National League, didn't get the RFS 1 licence.

=== Venues ===
Zenit Saint Petersburg	Ural Yekaterinburg	Khimki	Rostov
Krestovsky Stadium	Central Stadium	Arena Khimki	Rostov Arena
Capacity: 67,800	Capacity: 35,696	Capacity: 18,636	Capacity: 45,000
Spartak Moscow	Locations of teams in the 2021–22 Russian Premier League Locations of teams in the 2021–22 Russian Premier League in Moscow		Krylia Sovetov Samara
Otkritie Arena	Locations of teams in the 2021–22 Russian Premier League Locations of teams in the 2021–22 Russian Premier League in Moscow		Solidarnost Arena
Capacity: 44,307	Locations of teams in the 2021–22 Russian Premier League Locations of teams in the 2021–22 Russian Premier League in Moscow		Capacity: 44,918
Krasnodar	Locations of teams in the 2021–22 Russian Premier League Locations of teams in the 2021–22 Russian Premier League in Moscow		Akhmat Grozny
Krasnodar Stadium	Locations of teams in the 2021–22 Russian Premier League Locations of teams in the 2021–22 Russian Premier League in Moscow		Akhmat-Arena
Capacity: 34,291	Locations of teams in the 2021–22 Russian Premier League Locations of teams in the 2021–22 Russian Premier League in Moscow		Capacity: 30,597
CSKA Moscow	Locations of teams in the 2021–22 Russian Premier League Locations of teams in the 2021–22 Russian Premier League in Moscow		Lokomotiv Moscow
VEB Arena	Locations of teams in the 2021–22 Russian Premier League Locations of teams in the 2021–22 Russian Premier League in Moscow		RZD Arena
Capacity: 30,457	Locations of teams in the 2021–22 Russian Premier League Locations of teams in the 2021–22 Russian Premier League in Moscow		Capacity: 27,320
Sochi	Locations of teams in the 2021–22 Russian Premier League Locations of teams in the 2021–22 Russian Premier League in Moscow		Nizhny Novgorod
Fisht Olympic Stadium	Locations of teams in the 2021–22 Russian Premier League Locations of teams in the 2021–22 Russian Premier League in Moscow		Nizhny Novgorod Stadium
Capacity: 47,659	Locations of teams in the 2021–22 Russian Premier League Locations of teams in the 2021–22 Russian Premier League in Moscow		Capacity: 44,899
Arsenal Tula	Dynamo Moscow	Ufa	Rubin Kazan
Arsenal Stadium	VTB Arena	BetBoom Arena	Ak Bars Arena
Capacity: 20,048	Capacity: 26,319	Capacity: 15,132	Capacity: 45,093

=== Personnel and kits ===
Team	Location	Head coach	Captain	Kit manufacturer	Shirt sponsor
Akhmat	Grozny	(Russia) Andrei Talalayev	(Russia) Rizvan Utsiyev	(Italy) Macron	Akhmat Foundation/Parimatch
Arsenal	Tula	(Montenegro) Miodrag Božović	(Russia) Igor Smolnikov	(Germany) Adidas	Rostec
CSKA	Moscow	(Russia) Aleksei Berezutski	(Russia) Igor Akinfeev	(Spain) Joma	X-Holding/VEB.RF/Wildberries/Fonbet
Dynamo	Moscow	(Germany) Sandro Schwarz	(Russia) Anton Shunin	(Germany) Puma	VTB
Khimki	Khimki	(Russia) Sergei Yuran	(Russia) Dmitry Tikhy	(Germany) Puma	Parimatch
Krasnodar	Krasnodar	(Russia) Aleksandr Storozhuk	(Russia) Matvei Safonov	(Germany) Puma	Winline
Krylia Sovetov	Samara	(Russia) Igor Osinkin	(Russia) Aleksandr Soldatenkov	(Germany) Puma	BETTERY/Sogaz
Lokomotiv	Moscow	(Russia) Zaur Khapov	(Russia) Guilherme	(Germany) Adidas	RZhD
Nizhny Novgorod	Nizhny Novgorod	(Russia) Aleksandr Kerzhakov	(Russia) Kirill Gotsuk	(Germany) Jako	Parimatch
Rostov	Rostov-on-Don	(Russia) Valeri Karpin	(Russia) Danil Glebov	(Germany) Puma	TNS Energo
Rubin	Kazan	(Russia) Leonid Slutsky	(Russia) Vladislav Ignatyev	(Germany) Jako	TAIF
Sochi	Sochi	(Russia) Vladimir Fedotov	(Russia) Soslan Dzhanayev	(Germany) Puma	
Spartak	Moscow	(Italy) Paolo Vanoli	(Russia) Georgi Dzhikiya	(United States) Nike	Lukoil
Ufa	Ufa	(Russia) Aleksei Stukalov	(Slovenia) Bojan Jokić	(Spain) Joma	BetBoom
Ural	Yekaterinburg	(Russia) Igor Shalimov	(Romania) Eric Bicfalvi	(United States) Nike	TMK/Akademichesky/BetBoom
Zenit	Saint Petersburg	(Russia) Sergei Semak	(Croatia) Dejan Lovren	(United States) Nike	Gazprom

=== Managerial changes ===
Team	Outgoing manager	Manner of departure	Date of vacancy	Position in table	Replaced by	Date of appointment	Position in table
Spartak Moscow	(Germany) Domenico Tedesco	Contract expired	31 May 2021	Off-season	(Portugal) Rui Vitória	31 May 2021	Off-season
CSKA Moscow	(Croatia) Ivica Olić	Mutual consent	15 June 2021	Off-season	(Russia) Aleksei Berezutski	15 June 2021 (caretaker); 19 July 2021 (permanent)	Off-season
Nizhny Novgorod	(Russia) Anton Khazov	End of caretaker spell	17 June 2021	Off-season	(Russia) Aleksandr Kerzhakov	17 June 2021	Off-season
Rostov	(Russia) Valeri Karpin	Mutual consent after appointment as manager of the national team	2 August 2021	15th	(Russia) Yury Syomin	4 August 2021	15th
Ural Yekaterinburg	(Russia) Yuri Matveyev	Mutual consent	10 August 2021	15th	(Russia) Igor Shalimov	10 August 2021	15th
Arsenal Tula	(Ukraine) Dmytro Parfenov	Mutual consent	3 September 2021	15th	(Montenegro) Miodrag Božović	3 September 2021	15th
Rostov	(Russia) Yury Syomin	Resigned	25 September 2021	14th	(Russia) Zaur Tedeyev (caretaker)	25 September 2021	14th
Lokomotiv Moscow	(Serbia) Marko Nikolić	Mutual consent	5 October 2021	4th	(Germany) Markus Gisdol	10 October 2021	4th
Khimki	(Tajikistan) Igor Cherevchenko	Mutual consent	25 October 2021	14th	(Russia) Igor Yushchenko (caretaker)	25 October 2021	14th
Rostov	(Russia) Zaur Tedeyev (caretaker)	End of caretaker spell	26 October 2021	12th	(Kazakhstan) Vitaly Kafanov	26 October 2021	12th
Khimki	(Russia) Igor Yushchenko (caretaker)	Caretaking spell over	19 November 2021	15th	(Tajikistan) Igor Cherevchenko	19 November 2021	15th
Spartak Moscow	(Portugal) Rui Vitória	Mutual consent	15 December 2021	9th	(Italy) Paolo Vanoli	17 December 2021	9th
Krasnodar	(Belarus) Viktor Goncharenko	Sacked	5 January 2022	5th	(Germany) Daniel Farke	13 January 2022	5th
Khimki	(Tajikistan) Igor Cherevchenko	Mutual consent	22 February 2022	16th	(Russia) Sergei Yuran	23 February 2022	16th
Lokomotiv Moscow	(Germany) Markus Gisdol	Resigned	1 March 2022	7th	(Russia) Dmitri Loskov (caretaker)	3 March 2022	7th
Krasnodar	(Germany) Daniel Farke	Mutual consent	2 March 2022	6th	(Russia) Aleksandr Storozhuk	7 March 2022 (caretaker); 5 April 2022 (permanent)	6th
Rostov	(Kazakhstan) Vitaly Kafanov	Return to assistant coach position	10 March 2022	14th	(Russia) Valeri Karpin	10 March 2022	14th
Lokomotiv Moscow	(Russia) Dmitri Loskov (caretaker)	Caretaking spell over	4 April 2022	5th	(Russia) Zaur Khapov	4 April 2022	5th

== Tournament format and regulations ==
The 16 teams played a round-robin tournament whereby each team plays each one of the other teams twice, once at home and once away. Thus, a total of 240 matches played, with 30 matches played by each team.

=== Promotion and relegation ===
For the purpose of determining FNL positions for the following, the teams that will not pass 2022–23 RPL licensing or drop out of 2022–23 season for any other reason, or the second teams of RPL clubs (such as FC Krasnodar-2), or the teams that finished lower than 6th place in FNL standings will not be considered. For example, if the teams that finished 1st, 3rd and 4th in the FNL standings fail licensing, the team that finished 2nd will be considered 1st-placed team, the team that finished 5th will be considered 2nd-placed team and the team that finished 6th will be considered 3rd-placed team. There will be no designated 4th-placed team in this scenario.

The teams that finish 15th and 16th relegated to the FNL 2022–23, while the top 2 in that league promoted to the 2022–23 season.

The 13th and 14th Premier League teams will play the 4th and 3rd FNL 2021–22 teams respectively in two (home-and-away) playoff games, with away goals rule (including extra time of the return leg) and penalty shootout in effect, if necessary, the winners will secure Premier League spots for the 2022–23 season. If both of the teams that finish RPL in 13th and 14th place fail licensing for the 2022–23 season or drop out for any other reason, play-offs will not be held, and 3rd and 4th FNL teams will be promoted automatically. If one of the teams that place 13th and 14th in the Premier League fails licensing for 2022–23 season or drops out for other reasons, 3rd FNL team will be promoted automatically and the 13th or 14th-placed team that passes licensing will play 4th FNL team in playoffs, with the winners securing the Premier League spot. If only one FNL team is eligible for the play-offs (as in the example scenario above), that team will play the 14th-placed RPL team in playoffs, with the winners securing the Premier League spot, and the 13th RPL team will remain in the league. If none of the FNL teams are eligible for the play-offs, they will not be held and 13th and 14th-placed RPL teams will remain in the league. If any of the teams are unable to participate in the season after the play-offs have been concluded, or there are not enough teams that pass licensing to follow the above procedures, the replacement will be chosen by the Russian Football Union in consultation with RPL and FNL.

== Season events ==
=== COVID-19 pandemic ===
Due to the continuing COVID-19 pandemic in Russia, attendance for the games was limited. The specific restrictions are set by the appropriate local office of Rospotrebnadzor and therefore are not consistent between all clubs. FC Rostov played their initial home games without any fans in the stands, Moscow clubs were limited to 3,000 fans (with negative tests or proof of vaccination), Tatarstan office restricted FC Rubin Kazan attendance to 30% of stadium's capacity (approximately 15,000 fans) and most other games were limited to 500 fans. By late September, the limits were raised to 30% of capacity (with proof of vaccination) in Saint Petersburg and Moscow, while in some other locations the regulations remained more strict (such as 1,000 limit for home games of FC Ural Yekaterinburg). In December, the limit was raised to 70% of capacity (with proof of vaccination) in Moscow. All COVID-19-related restrictions were lifted on 3 March 2022 in Moscow and Saint Petersburg.

=== Issues related to the Russian invasion of Ukraine ===
On 24 February 2022, the Russian invasion of Ukraine began. The airports based in the provinces that are close to Ukraine were ordered closed until 2 March, including Platov International Airport in Rostov-on-Don and Krasnodar International Airport. For that reason, the games between FC Rostov and PFC Krylia Sovetov Samara and between FC Krasnodar and FC Lokomotiv Moscow, originally scheduled for 27 February, were postponed, with the other six games scheduled for the weekend going ahead. Ukrainian players, such as Ivan Ordets of Dynamo Moscow and Denys Kulakov of Ural Yekaterinburg, as well as Dynamo's assistant coach Andriy Voronin were not with their teams for the weekend's games. Voronin officially terminated his contract with Dynamo on 1 March, and Yaroslav Hodzyur of FC Ural Yekaterinburg was the first Ukrainian player to terminate his contract. In the following days, several more Ukrainian players terminated their contracts, and the ones who did not were not training with their clubs. The only Ukrainian player to appear in the early post-winter-break games was the new FC Lokomotiv Moscow signing Mark Mampassi, who also possesses Russian citizenship and was registered with the league as a domestic player. Several other players with dual Ukrainian-Russian citizenship (such as Daniil Khlusevich, Daniil Lesovoy or Ihor Kalinin) appeared for their clubs in later games, but none of the players who were registered with the league as Ukrainian citizens appeared on the field for the remainder of the season. On 11 March 2022, Ukrainian Association of Football stripped FC Zenit Saint Petersburg assistant coach Anatoliy Tymoshchuk of his coaching license and banned him from any football activity in Ukraine for not leaving Zenit and not making a public statement condemning Russia.

On 28 February 2022, FIFA and UEFA suspended Russian clubs from international competition until further notice.

On 1 March 2022, the airport closures were extended to 7 March. On the same day, FC Rostov confirmed that their game against PFC Sochi scheduled for 7 March will go ahead as scheduled. The game between FC Krasnodar and FC Ural Yekaterinburg was also not postponed, Ural flew into the Sochi International Airport and then took a 6.5-hour train ride into Krasnodar.

On 3 March 2022, FC Krasnodar announced that the contracts of 8 foreign players are suspended, but not terminated. The players would train on their own, but remain under contract.

On 7 March 2022, FIFA announced that foreign players in Russia would be able to unilaterally suspend their contracts with their clubs until 30 June 2022 (unless there is a mutual agreement reached with their Russian clubs otherwise before or on 10 March 2022) and sign with a club outside of Russia until 30 June 2022, and the transfer window is reopened for such players to sign and get registered for the new club until 7 April 2022. A foreign club would be allowed to sign at most two players under this condition. The first players to officially use the new rule and suspend their contracts were Luka Gagnidze and Luka Tsulukidze of FC Ural Yekaterinburg. In the following days, several foreign players, such as FC Krasnodar captain Grzegorz Krychowiak and FC Rubin Kazan captain Filip Uremović suspended their contracts under the new regulations, while some others, such as Wanderson and Júnior Alonso, were loaned out to foreign clubs without formally using the new rules. On 17 March 2022, German Football Association announced that the transfer window in Germany will not be re-opened and players from the Russian and Ukrainian leagues will not be allowed to be registered in German official national competitions to "maintain the sporting integrity of the competitions", despite FIFA giving permission to do so. Such players can participate in training and friendly games. It was reported that this decision blocked the transfer of Bastos from FC Rostov to Arminia Bielefeld that was allegedly arranged previously under the FIFA rule. Shortly after, it was reported that Italian Serie A and English Premier League would not re-open the transfer window for such players either, with the same justification as Germany (preserving the integrity of the competition), while Spanish La Liga did re-open the window. At the end of the special transfer window, 34 foreign players left their clubs or suspended their contracts after the invasion started. The transfers were not spread evenly across the clubs, most foreign players with Moscow-based clubs, Zenit Saint Petersburg and Sochi remained with their respective teams, while most of the core foreign players at clubs such as Krasnodar, Rostov or Rubin Kazan left.

Players who suspended their contracts

- (Georgia (country)) Luka Gagnidze - Dynamo Moscow
- (Sweden) Filip Dagerstål - Khimki
- (Brazil) Kaio - Krasnodar
- (Colombia) Jhon Córdoba - Krasnodar
- (Ecuador) Cristian Ramírez - Krasnodar
- (Norway) Erik Botheim - Krasnodar
- (Poland) Grzegorz Krychowiak - Krasnodar
- (Norway) Lars Olden Larsen - Nizhny Novgorod
- (Japan) Kento Hashimoto - Rostov
- (Sweden) Pontus Almqvist - Rostov
- (Sweden) Armin Gigović - Rostov
- (Croatia) Silvije Begić - Rubin Kazan
- (Croatia) Filip Uremović - Rubin Kazan
- (Denmark) Anders Dreyer - Rubin Kazan
- (Georgia (country)) Khvicha Kvaratskhelia - Rubin Kazan
- (Montenegro) Sead Hakšabanović - Rubin Kazan
- (South Korea) Hwang In-beom - Rubin Kazan
- (Sweden) Jordan Larsson - Spartak Moscow
- (Georgia (country)) Luka Tsulukidze - Ural Yekaterinburg
- (Ukraine) Denys Kulakov - Ural Yekaterinburg

=== Jan Kuchta issue ===
On 6 March 2022, FC Lokomotiv Moscow started Jan Kuchta in their game against FC Khimki, Kuchta was signed during the winter break. Kuchta scored the winning goal in a 3–2 Lokomotiv victory. Before transferring to Lokomotiv, Kuchta was sent-off in his last game for his previous club Slavia Prague, and he moved to Lokomotiv before serving his one-game disqualification in the Czech First League. According to FIFA regulations, disqualification should be served in the player's new league in this scenario and Kuchta was not eligible to play for Lokomotiv. FC Khimki lodged a protest. The protest was denied on 10 March 2022, according to Russian Football Union, Kuchta should have been disqualified for the Russian Cup game Lokomotiv played against FC Yenisey Krasnoyarsk on 3 March and lost 0–4, as Czech regulations extend disqualifications to Cup games, even though Russian regulations do not, so he was technically disqualified for "one league or Cup game" as opposed to "one league game". Lokomotiv did not provide the document detailing the disqualification to the league, the club claimed they did not receive it during the transfer, and he was allowed by the RFU to play in the Cup game. His disqualification is considered served after that game, even though he actually played in it, as per FIFA regulations. Khimki considered lodging an appeal.

== League table ==
Pos	Team	Pld	W	D	L	GF	GA	GD	Pts	Qualification or relegation
1	Zenit Saint Petersburg (C)	30	19	8	3	66	28	+38	65	
2	Sochi	30	17	5	8	54	30	+24	56	
3	Dynamo Moscow	30	16	5	9	53	41	+12	53	
4	Krasnodar	30	14	8	8	42	30	+12	50 (Note: Head-to-head points: Krasnodar 4, CSKA Moscow 1.)	
5	CSKA Moscow	30	15	5	10	42	29	+13	50	
6	Lokomotiv Moscow	30	13	9	8	43	39	+4	48	
7	Akhmat Grozny	30	13	3	14	36	38	−2	42	
8	Krylia Sovetov Samara	30	12	5	13	39	36	+3	41	
9	Rostov	30	10	8	12	47	51	−4	38 (Note: Head-to-head points: Rostov 4, Spartak Moscow 1.)	
10	Spartak Moscow	30	10	8	12	37	41	−4	38	
11	Nizhny Novgorod	30	8	9	13	26	39	−13	33 (Note: Head-to-head points: Nizhny Novgorod 4, Ural Yekaterinburg 1.)	
12	Ural Yekaterinburg	30	8	9	13	27	35	−8	33	
13	Khimki (O)	30	7	11	12	34	47	−13	32	Qualification for the relegation play-offs
14	Ufa (R)	30	6	12	12	29	40	−11	30	Qualification for the relegation play-offs
15	Rubin Kazan (R)	30	8	5	17	34	56	−22	29	Relegation to First League
16	Arsenal Tula (R)	30	5	8	17	30	59	−29	23	Relegation to First League

Source: Premier Liga
Rules for classification: 1) Points; 2) Head-to-head points; 3) Head-to-head matches won; 4) Head-to-head goal difference; 5) Head-to-head goals scored; 6) Matches won; 7) Goal difference; 8) Goals scored; 9) 2020–21 position (not applicable to final standings); 10) Play-off.
(C) Champions; (O) Play-off winners; (R) Relegated

== Relegation play-offs ==
=== First leg ===
25 May 2022
19:30 UTC+5

Orenburg	2–2	Ufa
Gojković 70'; Malykh 84'	Report	Agalarov 19' (pen.); Kamilov 61' (pen.)

Gazovik Stadium, Orenburg
Referee: Vladislav Bezborodov

25 May 2022
19:30 UTC+10

SKA-Khabarovsk	1–0	Khimki
Emmerson 14'	Report

Lenin Stadium, Khabarovsk
Referee: Vladimir Moskalyov

=== Second leg ===
28 May 2022
18:00 UTC+5

Ufa	1–2	Orenburg
Zhuravlyov 44'	Report	Fameyeh 13'; Malykh 90+4'

BetBoom Arena, Ufa
Referee: Pavel Kukuyan

Orenburg won 4–3 on aggregate and was promoted to the Russian Premier League, Ufa was relegated to the FNL.

28 May 2022
14:00 UTC+3

Khimki	3–0	SKA-Khabarovsk
Glushakov 8' (pen.); Mirzov 45+2'; Dolgov 50'	Report

Arena Khimki, Khimki
Referee: Sergey Ivanov

Khimki won 3–1 on aggregate and retained their Russian Premier League spot, SKA-Khabarovsk remained in the FNL.

== Results ==
Home \ Away	AKH	ARS	CSK	DYN	KHI	KRA	KRY	LOK	NIZ	ROS	RUB	SOC	SPA	UFA	URA	ZEN
Akhmat Grozny	—	2–1	2–0	2–1	4–1	0–2	1–0	2–3	3–1	2–0	1–2	1–2	0–1	2–1	1–0	0–2
Arsenal Tula	0–0	—	2–2	1–4	0–0	1–1	2–1	3–1	2–2	1–2	0–3	1–2	1–1	0–0	1–2	2–1
CSKA Moscow	2–0	2–0	—	1–0	0–0	0–0	3–1	1–2	1–0	4–0	6–1	0–1	1–0	1–0	2–2	0–2
Dynamo Moscow	2–0	5–1	2–1	—	4–1	1–0	0–1	1–1	1–2	1–1	2–0	1–5	0–2	2–0	2–3	1–1
Khimki	2–0	1–2	4–2	0–3	—	3–3	4–1	0–0	1–1	1–1	1–1	0–0	2–1	1–1	0–0	1–3
Krasnodar	1–1	3–2	1–0	0–1	0–1	—	0–1	1–0	0–0	2–1	2–0	3–0	2–1	1–1	2–1	1–3
Krylia Sovetov Samara	1–2	2–2	0–1	5–2	3–0	2–0	—	0–1	2–0	4–2	2–0	1–0	0–1	1–2	1–1	1–1
Lokomotiv Moscow	1–2	3–1	1–2	3–3	3–2	2–1	2–0	—	2–1	1–2	1–0	2–1	1–0	2–0	0–1	1–1
Nizhny Novgorod	0–1	2–3	0–2	0–1	0–0	1–4	0–0	1–2	—	1–2	2–1	1–0	1–1	1–2	1–0	1–0
Rostov	1–2	4–0	1–3	0–2	2–1	1–1	1–0	4–1	1–2	—	5–1	0–1	3–2	2–2	1–4	2–4
Rubin Kazan	2–1	1–0	1–0	2–3	2–3	0–1	1–1	2–2	0–1	1–2	—	0–6	1–0	1–2	4–0	1–3
Sochi	3–2	2–0	4–1	0–1	3–0	1–2	2–3	2–2	0–0	3–2	1–2	—	3–0	3–1	2–0	0–0
Spartak Moscow	2–1	3–0	0–2	2–2	3–1	1–2	2–1	1–1	1–2	1–1	1–1	1–2	—	2–0	1–0	1–1
Ufa	1–0	2–1	1–1	2–3	3–2	1–1	1–2	1–1	0–0	0–0	1–1	1–2	1–1	—	0–1	1–1
Ural Yekaterinburg	0–0	2–0	0–1	0–1	0–1	0–3	0–1	0–0	1–1	1–1	3–0	1–1	1–3	2–1	—	0–0
Zenit Saint Petersburg	3–1	3–0	1–0	4–1	1–0	3–2	2–1	3–1	5–1	2–2	3–2	1–2	7–1	2–0	3–1	—

Source: Russian Premier League
Legend: Blue = home team win; Yellow = draw; Red = away team win.
For upcoming matches, an "a" indicates there is an article about the rivalry between the two participants.

== Season statistics ==
=== Top goalscorers ===
Rank	Player	Club	Goals
1	(Russia) Gamid Agalarov	Ufa	19
2	(Colombia) Mateo Cassierra	Sochi	14
2	(Russia) Dmitry Poloz	Rostov	14
4	(Russia) Fyodor Smolov	Lokomotiv Moscow; Dynamo Moscow	12
5	(Russia) Artem Dzyuba	Zenit Saint Petersburg	11
6	(Romania) Eric Bicfalvi	Ural Yekaterinburg	10
6	(Russia) Ivan Sergeyev	Krylia Sovetov Samara; Zenit Saint Petersburg	10
6	(Russia) Denis Glushakov	Khimki	10
6	(Russia) Daniil Fomin	Dynamo Moscow	10
10	(Russia) Rifat Zhemaletdinov	Lokomotiv Moscow	9
10	(Russia) Vladislav Sarveli	Krylia Sovetov Samara	9
10	(Russia) Daniil Utkin	Akhmat Grozny	9
10	(Russia) Aleksandr Sobolev	Spartak Moscow	9

== Awards ==
=== Monthly awards ===
Month	Player of the Month		Manager of the Month		Goal of the Month		Ref.
Month	Player	Club	Manager	Club	Player	Club	Ref.
July - August	(Russia) Fyodor Smolov	Lokomotiv Moscow	(Germany) Sandro Schwarz	Dynamo Moscow	(Russia) Aleksei Ionov	Krasnodar	
September	(Russia) Artem Dzyuba	Zenit Saint Petersburg	(Germany) Sandro Schwarz	Dynamo Moscow	(Denmark) Anders Dreyer	Rubin Kazan	
October	(Russia) Gamid Agalarov	Ufa	(Russia) Igor Osinkin	Krylia Sovetov Samara	(Zambia) Kings Kangwa	Arsenal Tula	
November - December	(Brazil) Claudinho	Zenit Saint Petersburg	(Germany) Sandro Schwarz	Dynamo Moscow	(Brazil) Claudinho	Zenit Saint Petersburg	
February - March	(Turkey) Yusuf Yazıcı	CSKA Moscow	(Russia) Aleksei Berezutski	CSKA Moscow	(Netherlands) Quincy Promes	Spartak Moscow	
April	(France) Wilson Isidor	Lokomotiv Moscow	(Russia) Valeri Karpin	Rostov	(Russia) Kirill Shchetinin	Rostov	
May	(Romania) Eric Bicfalvi	Ural Yekaterinburg	(Russia) Vladimir Fedotov	Sochi	(Russia) Nikita Krivtsov	Krasnodar	

=== Season awards ===
==== Russian Football Union awards ====
On 23 June 2022, Russian Football Union named its list of 33 top players:

Goalkeepers

1. (Russia) Matvei Safonov (Krasnodar)
2. (Russia) Igor Akinfeev (CSKA)
3. (Russia) Ilya Lantratov (Khimki)

Right backs

1. (Russia) Mário Fernandes (CSKA)
2. (Russia) Aleksei Sutormin (Zenit)
3. (Uruguay) Guillermo Varela (Dynamo)

Right-centre backs

1. (Paraguay) Fabián Balbuena (Dynamo)
2. (Russia) Igor Diveyev (CSKA)
3. (Russia) Maksim Osipenko (Rostov)

Left-centre backs

1. (Brazil) Rodrigão (Sochi)
2. (Russia) Georgi Dzhikiya (Spartak)
3. (Russia) Dmitri Chistyakov (Zenit)

Left backs

1. (Brazil) Douglas Santos (Zenit)
2. (Russia) Sergey Terekhov (Sochi)
3. (Russia) Danil Krugovoy (Zenit)

Right midfielders

1. (Brazil) Malcom (Zenit)
2. (Russia) Zelimkhan Bakayev (Spartak)
3. (Russia) Daler Kuzyayev (Zenit)

Right central midfielders

1. (Ecuador) Christian Noboa (Sochi)
2. (Poland) Sebastian Szymański (Dynamo)
3. (Russia) Daniil Fomin (Dynamo)

Left central midfielders

1. (Brazil) Claudinho (Zenit)
2. (Colombia) Wilmar Barrios (Zenit)
3. (Russia) Danil Glebov (Rostov)

Left midfielders

1. (Russia) Arsen Zakharyan (Dynamo)
2. (Russia) Anton Zinkovsky (Krylia Sovetov)
3. (Russia) Dmitry Poloz (Rostov)

Right forwards

1. (Russia) Gamid Agalarov (Ufa)
2. (Russia) Rifat Zhemaletdinov (Lokomotiv)
3. (Russia) Artem Dzyuba (Zenit)

Left forwards

1. (Colombia) Mateo Cassierra (Sochi)
2. (Russia) Ivan Sergeyev (Zenit)
3. (Romania) Eric Bicfalvi (Ural)

Other awards announced by RFU on the same day included:

- Best player: Christian Noboa (Sochi)
- Best coach: Sergei Semak (Zenit)
- Best team: FC Zenit Saint Petersburg
- Best young player: Arsen Zakharyan (Dynamo)
- For contribution to football development: Sergey Galitsky (Krasnodar)

=== Russian Premier League awards ===
- Player of the season: Claudinho (Zenit)
- Coach of the season: Sergei Semak (Zenit)
- Goal of the season: Kirill Shchetinin (Rostov 4–1 Lokomotiv, 10 April 2022)
- Young player of the season: Gamid Agalarov (Ufa)
- Goalkeeper of the season: Igor Akinfeev (CSKA)

== Season records ==
- For the first time in the history of the Russian Premier League, there was no scoreless draws for 61 consecutive matches (23 July 2021 to 19 September 2021) until FC Ural Yekaterinburg and FC Lokomotiv Moscow finished with the 0–0 score on 20 September 2021.
