= 2020 Russian Cup final =

- Event: 2019–20 Russian Cup
Zenit St. Petersburg	Khimki
1	0
- Date: 25 July 2020
- Venue: Yekaterinburg Arena, Yekaterinburg
- Referee: Vladimir Moskalyov (Voronezh)
- Attendance: 3,408

The 2020 Russian Cup final was the 28th Russian Cup Final, the final match of the 2019–20 Russian Cup. It was played at Yekaterinburg Arena in Yekaterinburg, Russia, on 25 July 2020, contested by Zenit St. Petersburg and Khimki. Zenit won the match 1–0, with the only goal coming from Artem Dzyuba's penalty kick in the 84th minute.

The game was originally scheduled for 13 May, but was delayed due to the COVID-19 pandemic in Russia. For the same reason, attendance was limited to 10% of the arena's capacity and the teams were allowed to make 5 substitutions instead of customary 3.

Since Zenit had already qualified for the 2020–21 UEFA Champions League, Dynamo Moscow will enter the 2020–21 UEFA Europa League in the second qualifying round.

== Route to the final ==
=== Zenit Saint Petersburg ===
Round	Opposition	Score
Round of 32	Yenisey Krasnoyarsk (A)	1–2
Round of 16	Tom Tomsk (H)	4–0
QF	Akhmat Grozny (A)	2–1 (a.e.t.)
SF	Spartak Moscow (H)	2–1
Key: (H) = Home venue; (A) = Away venue; (N) = Neutral venue.

=== Khimki ===
Round	Opposition	Score
Fourth Round	Avangard Kursk (H)	4–1
Round of 32	Rubin Kazan (H)	3–0
Round of 16	Orenburg (A)	2–1
QF	Torpedo Moscow (H)	5–1
SF	Ural Yekaterinburg (A)	3–1
Key: (H) = Home venue; (A) = Away venue; (N) = Neutral venue.

== Match ==
=== Details ===
25 July 2020
19:00 YEKT

Zenit St. Petersburg	1–0	Khimki
Dzyuba 84' (pen.)	Report

Yekaterinburg Arena, Yekaterinburg
Attendance: 3,408
Referee: Vladimir Moskalyov (Voronezh)

Zenit St. Petersburg	Khimki

GK	1	(Russia) Mikhail Kerzhakov
DF	6	(Serbia) Branislav Ivanović (c)
DF	15	(Russia) Vyacheslav Karavayev		(substituted off) 90'
DF	44	(Ukraine) Yaroslav Rakitskiy	(yellow card) 64'
DF	3	(Brazil) Douglas Santos		(substituted off) 76'
MF	27	(Russia) Magomed Ozdoyev		(substituted off) 76'
MF	14	(Russia) Daler Kuzyayev
MF	5	(Colombia) Wílmar Barrios
FW	22	(Russia) Artem Dzyuba	84' (pen.)
FW	7	(Iran) Sardar Azmoun	(yellow card) 37'	(substituted off) 88'
FW	8	(Brazil) Malcom		(substituted off) 88'
Substitutes:
GK	78	(Russia) Aleksandr Vasyutin
GK	71	(Russia) Daniil Odoyevskiy
DF	19	(Russia) Igor Smolnikov		(substituted in) 90'
DF	24	(Argentina) Emanuel Mammana
DF	4	(Venezuela) Yordan Osorio
MF	18	(Russia) Yuri Zhirkov		(substituted in) 76'
MF	17	(Russia) Oleg Shatov		(substituted in) 88'
MF	21	(Russia) Aleksandr Yerokhin
MF	91	(Russia) Aleksei Sutormin		(substituted in) 88'
MF	38	(Russia) Leon Musayev
MF	10	(Argentina) Emiliano Rigoni
FW	11	(Argentina) Sebastián Driussi		(substituted in) 76'
Manager:
(Russia) Sergei Semak

GK	22	(Russia) Ilya Lantratov
DF	33	(Russia) Yevgeny Gapon (c)
DF	6	(Russia) Dmitri Tikhiy
DF	15	(Russia) Yegor Danilkin
DF	96	(Russia) Aleksandr Smirnov		(substituted off) 64'
MF	9	(Russia) Maksim Martusevich
MF	23	(Russia) Arshak Koryan		(substituted off) 81'
MF	5	(Russia) Aleksandr Troshechkin
MF	87	(Russia) Kirill Bozhenov	(yellow card) 40'
MF	14	(Ukraine) Artem Polyarus		(substituted off) 88'
FW	64	(Russia) Vladimir Dyadyun	(yellow card) 35'	(substituted off) 64'
Substitutes:
GK	1	(Russia) Dmitri Khomich
GK	35	(Russia) Yegor Generalov
DF	4	(Russia) Mikhail Tikhonov
DF	99	(Russia) Andrei Yevdokimov
MF	70	(Russia) Andrei Murnin
MF	44	(Russia) Ilya Kukharchuk	(yellow card) 90+'	(substituted in) 64'
MF	20	(Russia) Nikita Malyarov
MF	3	(Russia) Svyatoslav Georgiyevsky
MF	8	(Russia) Bogdan Mishukov
FW	24	(Ivory Coast) Mohamed Konaté		(substituted in) 88'
FW	10	(Azerbaijan) Kamran Aliyev		(substituted in) 81'
FW	11	(Russia) Dmitry Barkov	(yellow card) 90'	(substituted in) 64'
Manager:
(Russia) Sergei Yuran

Man of the Match:

Assistant referees:
Dmitri Mosyakin (Moscow)
Dmitri Bereznev (Rostov-on-Don)
Fourth official:
Aleksei Matyunin (Moscow)

Match rules

- 90 minutes
- 30 minutes of extra time if necessary
- Penalty shoot-out if scores still level
- Twelve named substitutes
- Maximum of five substitutions
