= 2020–21 FC Khimki season =

FC Khimki
2020–21 season
- Owner: Khimki
- Chairman: Vasili Ivanov (until 1 August); Dmitri Gunko (1 August – 21 September); Igor Cherevchenko (from 25 September)
- Manager: Sergei Yuran
- Stadium: Arena Khimki
- Russian Premier League: 8th
- Russian Cup: Round of 16 vs Krylia Sovetov
- Top goalscorer: League: Reziuan Mirzov (6); All: Reziuan Mirzov (6)
- Highest home attendance: 5,450 vs Sochi (16 May 2021)
- Lowest home attendance: 0 vs Zenit St.Petersburg (1 November 2020) vs Rubin Kazan (8 November 2020) vs Krasnodar (28 November 2020) vs Arsenal Tula (11 December 2020)
- Average home league attendance: 1,699 (16 May 2021)

The 2020–21 FC Khimki season was the club's 24th season in existence and the first season back in the top flight of Russian football. In addition to the domestic league, Khimki participated in this season's editions of the Russian Cup. The season covers the period from 26 July 2020 to 30 June 2021. Khimki finished the season 8th in the league, and where knocked out of the Russian Cup by Krylia Sovetov in the Round of 16.

== Season events ==
On 1 August, manager Sergei Yuran was relieved of duty his duties as manager, with Dmitri Gunko being appointed as his replacement the same day. Gunko left the club by mutual consent on 21 September, with Igor Cherevchenko being appointed as his successor on 25 September.

== Squad ==
As of 14 May 2021

Note: Flags indicate national team as defined under FIFA eligibility rules; some limited exceptions apply. Players may hold more than one non-FIFA nationality.

No.	Pos.	Nation	Player
1	GK	RUS	Dmitri Khomich
2	DF	RUS	Arseny Logashov (on loan from Rostov)
3	DF	SWE	Filip Dagerstål
4	DF	NGR	Brian Idowu (on loan from Lokomotiv Moscow)
5	MF	RUS	Aleksandr Troshechkin
6	DF	RUS	Dmitri Tikhiy
7	MF	RUS	Gela Zaseyev
8	MF	RUS	Denis Glushakov
9	MF	RUS	Maksim Glushenkov (on loan from Spartak Moscow)
10	FW	RUS	Kamran Aliyev
11	MF	RUS	Reziuan Mirzov (on loan from Spartak Moscow)
15	DF	RUS	Yegor Danilkin
17	FW	ARM	Arshak Koryan

No.	Pos.	Nation	Player
19	FW	CIV	Senin Sebai
22	GK	RUS	Ilya Lantratov
25	DF	RUS	Oleksandr Filin
28	MF	RUS	Pavel Mogilevets
35	GK	RUS	Yegor Generalov
42	DF	RUS	Mikhail Tikhonov
44	FW	RUS	Ilya Kukharchuk
45	FW	BFA	Mohamed Konaté
47	FW	RUS	Aleksandr Dolgov (on loan from Rostov)
63	MF	RUS	Danil Kazantsev
70	MF	RUS	Andrei Murnin
87	DF	RUS	Kirill Bozhenov
88	FW	RUS	Vladimir Dyadyun

== Out on loan ==
Note: Flags indicate national team as defined under FIFA eligibility rules; some limited exceptions apply. Players may hold more than one non-FIFA nationality.

No.	Pos.	Nation	Player
—	MF	RUS	Nikita Balakhontsev (on loan at Novosibirsk)

== Transfers ==
=== In ===
Date	Position	Nationality	Name	From	Fee	Ref.
3 September 2020	MF	(Nigeria)	Chidi Osuchukwu	Rukh Brest	Undisclosed	
7 September 2020	DF	(Russia)	Sergei Mizgiryov	Dynamo Barnaul	Free	
8 September 2020	FW	(Belarus)	Mikalay Signevich	Ferencváros	Undisclosed	
11 September 2020	MF	(Kazakhstan)	Islambek Kuat	Orenburg	Undisclosed	
1 October 2020	MF	(Russia)	Denis Glushakov	Akhmat Grozny	Free	
16 October 2020	MF	(Russia)	Pavel Mogilevets	Rubin Kazan	Free	
15 January 2021	FW	(Ivory Coast)	Senin Sebai	Tobol	Undisclosed	
23 January 2021	MF	(Sweden)	Filip Dagerstål	IFK Norrköping	Undisclosed	

=== Loans in ===
Date from	Position	Nationality	Name	From	Date to	Ref.
7 August 2020	DF	(Nigeria)	Brian Idowu	Lokomotiv Moscow	End of season	
11 August 2020	DF	(Russia)	Danil Lipovoy	Dynamo Moscow	24 December 2020	
12 August 2020	MF	(Russia)	Aleksandr Lomovitsky	Spartak Moscow	1 October 2020	
28 August 2020	FW	(Russia)	Ilya Vorobyov	Zenit St.Petersburg	17 October 2020	
2 October 2020	FW	(Russia)	Reziuan Mirzov	Spartak Moscow	End of season	
16 October 2020	DF	(Russia)	Arseny Logashov	Rostov	End of season	
16 October 2020	MF	(Russia)	Ilya Kamyshev	Chertanovo Moscow	End of season	
16 October 2020	FW	(Russia)	Aleksandr Dolgov	Rostov	End of season	
2 February 2021	MF	(Russia)	Maksim Glushenkov	Spartak Moscow	End of season	

=== Out ===
Date	Position	Nationality	Name	To	Fee	Ref.
11 June 2020	MF	(Russia)	Andrei Mendel	Volgar Astrakhan	Undisclosed	
28 September 2020	FW	(Belarus)	Mikalay Signevich	BATE Borisov	Undisclosed	
1 October 2020	MF	(Ukraine)	Artem Polyarus	Akhmat Grozny	Undisclosed	
16 October 2020	MF	(Nigeria)	Chidi Osuchukwu	Tom Tomsk	Undisclosed	
13 May 2021	DF	(Russia)	Yevgeny Gapon	Shakhter Karagandy	Undisclosed	

=== Loans out ===
Date from	Position	Nationality	Name	To	Date to	Ref.
5 February 2021	MF	(Russia)	Nikita Balakhontsev	Novosibirsk	End of season	

=== Released ===
Date	Position	Nationality	Name	Joined	Date	Ref.
1 June 2020	GK	(Russia)	Evgeny Puzin	Zelenograd		
1 June 2020	FW	(Russia)	Dmitri Kamenshchikov	Tom Tomsk	26 June 2020	
1 June 2020	FW	(Russia)	Artyom Popov			
1 June 2020	FW	(Russia)	Aleksei Skvortsov	Orenburg	29 July 2020	
25 July 2020	GK	(Russia)	Vladislav Lizenko			
25 July 2020	MF	(Russia)	Nikita Malyarov	Shinnik Yaroslavl	18 September 2020	
31 July 2020	MF	(Russia)	Aleksandr Smirnov	Rostov	4 August 2020	
31 July 2020	FW	(Russia)	Dmitry Barkov	SKA-Khabarovsk	1 August 2020	
14 September 2020	DF	(Russia)	Sergei Bednozhey			
16 October 2020	FW	(Russia)	Maksim Martusevich	SKA-Khabarovsk	31 October 2020	
12 January 2021	DF	(Russia)	Sergei Mizgiryov			
13 March 2021	MF	(Kazakhstan)	Islambek Kuat	Astana	16 March 2021	

== Friendlies ==
2 August 2020	Khimki	2 – 0	Dynamo Moscow	Khimki
17:00 MSK (UTC+3)	Martusevich (yellow card) 57'; Konaté 62', 72'; Troshechkin (yellow card) 75'	Report	Ordets (yellow card) 19'; Markov (yellow card) 45'	Stadium: Arena Khimki; Referee: Oleg Koretsky

9 August 2020	Khimki	5 – 5	Russia U19	Khimki
12:30 MSK (UTC+3)		Report		Stadium: Arena Khimki

20 January 2021	Khimki (Russia)	1 – 1	(Bulgaria) Septemvri Simitli	Belek, Turkey
11:00 MSK (UTC+3)	Mogilevets 23' (pen.)	Report	Goal

20 January 2021	Khimki (Russia)	4 – 3	(Serbia) Radnik Surdulica	Belek, Turkey
17:00 MSK (UTC+3)	Konaté 26' (pen.), 43'; Mirzov 34'	Report	Goal

24 January 2021	Khimki (Russia)	1 – 3	(Slovenia) Celje	Belek, Turkey
17:00 MSK (UTC+3)	Sebai 60' (pen.)	Report	Goal

2 February 2021	Khimki	2 – 2	Rubin Kazan	Belek, Turkey
15:00 MSK (UTC+3)	Mirzov 54', 70'	Report	Despotović 21'; Jevtić 45'

6 February 2021	Khimki	2 – 0	Chayka Peschanokopskoye	Belek, Turkey
17:30 MSK (UTC+3)	Goal	Report

10 February 2021	Khimki (Russia)	4 – 1	(Kazakhstan) Astana	Belek, Turkey
17:00 MSK (UTC+3)	Goal	Report	Goal

11 February 2021	Khimki	0 – 2	Chertanovo Moscow	Belek, Turkey
15:00 MSK (UTC+3)		Report	Goal

== Competitions ==
=== Overview ===
Competition	First match	Last match	Starting round	Record							
Competition	First match	Last match	Starting round	Pld	W	D	L	GF	GA	GD	Win %
Premier League	8 August 2020	May 2021	Matchday 1	30	13	6	11	35	39	−4	43.33
Russian Cup	15 September		Round of 32	2	1	1	0	2	1	+1	50.00
Total				32	14	7	11	37	40	−3	43.75

Last updated: 16 May 2021
Source: Soccerway

=== Premier League ===
==== League table ====
Pos	Team	Pld	W	D	L	GF	GA	GD	Pts
6	CSKA Moscow	30	15	5	10	51	33	+18	50 (Note: Head-to-head points: CSKA 3, Dynamo 3. Head-to-head goal difference: CSKA +1, Dynamo -1.)
7	Dynamo Moscow	30	15	5	10	44	33	+11	50
8	Khimki	30	13	6	11	35	39	−4	45
9	Rostov	30	13	4	13	37	35	+2	43
10	Krasnodar	30	12	5	13	52	45	+7	41

Source: Premier Liga
Rules for classification: 1) Points; 2) Head-to-head points; 3) Head-to-head matches won; 4) Head-to-head goal difference; 5) Head-to-head goals scored; 6) Matches won; 7) Goal difference; 8) Goals scored; 9) Play-off.

==== Results summary ====
Overall								Home						Away					
Pld	W	D	L	GF	GA	GD	Pts	W	D	L	GF	GA	GD	W	D	L	GF	GA	GD
30	13	6	11	25	39	−14	45	9	2	4	17	13	+4	4	4	7	8	26	−18

Last updated: 16 May 2021.
Source: Premier Liga

==== Results by round ====
Round	1	2	3	4	5	6	7	8	9	10	11	12	13	14	15	16	17	18	19	20	21	22	23	24	25	26	27	28	29	30
Ground	H	A	A	H	A	H	A	A	H	A	H	A	H	H	A	H	A	H	H	H	A	H	A	A	H	A	A	H	A	H
Result	L	D	L	L	D	D	L	L	W	L	L	W	L	W	W	W	D	W	W	W	D	W	W	L	W	L	W	W	L	D
Position	15	14	15	15	15	15	15	15	14	14	14	13	14	14	12	12	12	11	11	10	10	10	9	9	8	8	8	8	8	8

Updated to match(es) played on 16 May 2021. Source: Premier Liga
A = Away; H = Home; W = Win; D = Draw; L = Loss

==== Matches ====
8 August 2020 1	Khimki	0–2	CSKA Moscow	Khimki
16:00 MSK (UTC+3)		Report	Kuchayev 19'; Dzagoev 45'	Stadium: Arena Khimki; Attendance: 4,948; Referee: Vladislav Bezborodov

14 August 2020 2	Sochi	1–1	Khimki	Sochi
19:00 MSK (UTC+3)	Poloz (yellow card) 23'; Terekhov (yellow card) 31'; Noboa 63'	Report	Troshechkin 24'; Dyadyun (yellow card) 49'; Polyarus (yellow card) 51'; Bozhenov (yellow card) 55'	Stadium: Fisht Olympic Stadium; Attendance: 3,613; Referee: Sergei Karasev

18 August 2020 3	Tambov	1–0	Khimki	Saransk
19:00 MSK (UTC+3)	Ciupercă 14', (yellow card) 42'; Gritsayenko (red card) 40'; Shlyakov (yellow card) 79'	Report	Dyadyun (yellow card) 45+1'; Lomovitsky (yellow card) 52'; Troshechkin (yellow card) 67'; Konaté (yellow card) 70'; Tikhiy (yellow card) 86'; Polyarus (yellow card) 90+1'; Koryan (yellow card) 90+2'	Stadium: Mordovia Arena; Attendance: 1,820; Referee: Mikhail Vilkov
Note: Match was played at the Mordovia Arena in Saransk instead of Tambov's regular Spartak Stadium.

22 August 2020 4	Khimki	1–2	Akhmat Grozny	Khimki
16:00 MSK (UTC+3)	Bozhenov (yellow card) 16' (yellow-red card) 90+3'; Danilkin 21'; Polyarus (yellow card) 39'; Idowu (yellow card) 72' (yellow-red card) 76'; Troshechkin (yellow card) 88'	Report	Ismael (yellow card) 3'; Ponce (yellow card) 35'; Ilyin 73' (pen.); Timofeyev 74'; Berisha (yellow card) 76'; Semyonov (yellow card) 80'; A. Kadyrov (yellow card) 90'	Stadium: Arena Khimki; Attendance: 1,630; Referee: Pavel Kukuyan

25 August 2020 5	Arsenal Tula	1–1	Khimki	Tula
20:30 MSK (UTC+3)	Sokol (yellow card) 59'; E. Kangwa 76'	Report	Aliyev (yellow card) 8', (goal) 30'; Kukharchuk (yellow card) 11'; Troshechkin (yellow card) 15'; Kazantsev (yellow card) 68' (yellow-red card) 77'	Stadium: Arsenal Stadium; Attendance: 3,244; Referee: Nikolay Voloshin

29 August 2020 6	Khimki	1–1	Rotor Volgograd	Khimki
20:00 MSK (UTC+3)	Murnin (yellow card) 23'; Bozhenov (yellow card) 39'; Lomovitsky 56'; Idowu (yellow card) 82'; Troshechkin (yellow card) 90+'	Report	Kvirkvelia (yellow card) 29'; Mullin 32'; Bairyyev (yellow card) 53'; Aleynik (yellow card) 79'	Stadium: Arena Khimki; Attendance: 2,541; Referee: Kirill Levnikov

12 September 2020 7	Ural Yekaterinburg	3–1	Khimki	Yekaterinburg
16:30 MSK (UTC+3)	Bicfalvi 15' (pen.), 67', (yellow card) 62'; Strandberg 23'	Report	Dyadyun (yellow card) 12'; Koryan 52'; Kuat (yellow card) 61'; Murnin (yellow card) 71'	Stadium: Central Stadium; Attendance: 6,037; Referee: Vladimir Moskalyov

18 September 2020 8	Krasnodar	7–2	Khimki	Krasnodar
20:00 MSK (UTC+3)	Berg 19'; Claesson 23', 45'; Vilhena 52'; Cabella 62'; Utkin 74'; Suleymanov 89'	Report	Tikhiy (yellow card) 18'; Koryan 27', 42' (pen.)	Stadium: Krasnodar Stadium; Attendance: 10,554; Referee: Sergey Lapochkin

28 September 2020 9	Khimki	1–0	Dynamo Moscow	Khimki
19:00 MSK (UTC+3)	Kuat (yellow card) 9'; Lomovitsky 19'; Kukharchuk (yellow card) 57'; Danilkin (yellow card) 67'; Idowu (yellow card) 85'; Tikhiy (yellow card) 90'	Report	Yevgenyev (yellow card) 42'; Fomin (yellow card) 43'; Skopintsev (yellow card) 64'	Stadium: Arena Khimki; Attendance: 2,732; Referee: Sergey Ivanov

4 October 2020 10	Lokomotiv Moscow	2–1	Khimki	Moscow
14:00 MSK (UTC+3)	Lisakovich 25'; Ignatyev 55'	Report	Danilkin (yellow card) 9'; Gapon (yellow card) 45'; Bozhenov 46'; Tikhiy (yellow card) 90'; Glushakov (yellow card) 90'	Stadium: RZD Arena; Attendance: 7,920; Referee: Yevgeni Kukulyak

17 October 2020 11	Khimki	2–3	Spartak Moscow	Khimki
19:00 MSK (UTC+3)	Troshechkin (yellow card) 5'; Mirzov (yellow card) 40' (goal) 48'; Kukharchuk (yellow card) 52'; Logashov (yellow card) 57'; Idowu 85'; Glushakov (yellow card) 88'; Danilkin (yellow card) 90+'	Report	Ponce (yellow card) 29' (goal) 63'; Maslov (yellow card) 31'; Kokorin 57' (pen.) (yellow card) 70'; Larsson 77'	Stadium: Arena Khimki; Attendance: 3,881; Referee: Kirill Levnikov

25 October 2020 12	Rostov	0–2	Khimki	Rostov-on-Don
16:30 MSK (UTC+3)	Eremenko (yellow card) 26' (red card) 71'; Obukhov (yellow card) 42'	Report	Mirzov (yellow card) 22' (goal) 90+'; Tikhiy (yellow card) 73'; Gapon (yellow card) 87'; Idowu 90+'	Stadium: Rostov Arena; Attendance: 10,879; Referee: Vasily Kazartsev

1 November 2020 13	Khimki	0–2	Zenit St.Petersburg	Khimki
14:00 MSK (UTC+3)	Idowu (yellow card) 82'	Report	Mostovoy 18'; Sutormin (yellow card) 27'; Yerokhin (yellow card) 37' (goal) 78'; Zhirkov (yellow card) 61'	Stadium: Arena Khimki; Referee: Aleksei Matyunin

8 November 2020 14	Khimki	2–0	Rubin Kazan	Khimki
14:00 MSK (UTC+3)	Filin (yellow card) 40'; Konaté (yellow card) 42'; Mirzov 48'; Troshechkin (yellow card) 56'; Glushakov 69'; Lantratov (yellow card) 90'	Report	Begić (yellow card) 27'; Kvaratskhelia (yellow card) 50'; Uremović (yellow card) 67'	Stadium: Arena Khimki; Referee: Sergey Lapochkin

23 November 2020 15	Ufa	1–2	Khimki	Ufa
17:00 MSK (UTC+3)	Sukhov (yellow card) 39'; Jokić (yellow card) 75' (goal) 83'; Golubev (yellow card) 82'; Tabidze (yellow card) 86'; Mrzljak (yellow card) 89'	Report	Kukharchuk 5' (yellow card) 80'; Troshechkin 37'; Filin (yellow card) 48'; Glushakov (yellow card) 53'	Stadium: Neftyanik Stadium; Attendance: 1,424; Referee: Stanislav Vasiliev

28 November 2020 16	Khimki	1–0	Krasnodar	Khimki
16:30 MSK (UTC+3)	Konaté (yellow card) 32' (goal) 67'; Dyadyun (yellow card) 59'; Mirzov (yellow card) 90+'	Report	Kaio (yellow card) 22'; Ari (yellow card) 90'; Gazinsky (yellow card) 90+'	Stadium: Arena Khimki; Referee: Sergey Ivanov

6 December 2020 17	CSKA Moscow	2–2	Khimki	Moscow
19:00 MSK (UTC+3)	Vlašić 40'; Shkurin 54'; Diveyev (yellow card) 70'	Report	Troshechkin (yellow card) 26'; Kuat (yellow card) 38'; Kukharchuk 47' (yellow card) 50'; Mirzov 51'	Stadium: VEB Arena; Attendance: 4,612; Referee: Kirill Levnikov

11 December 2020 18	Khimki	1–0	Arsenal Tula	Khimki
19:00 MSK (UTC+3)	Kukharchuk 12'; Glushakov (yellow card) 46'; Tikhiy (yellow card) 63'; Idowu (yellow card) 90+2'	Report	Sokol (yellow card) 18'; Gromyko (yellow card) 90'	Stadium: Arena Khimki; Referee: Ivan Sidenkov

17 December 2020 19	Khimki	3–2	Lokomotiv Moscow	Khimki
18:00 MSK (UTC+3)	Koryan 26' (pen.) (yellow card) 44'; Kukharchuk 85'; Dolgov 90+3'	Report	Krychowiak 15'; Murilo 37'; Kulikov (yellow card) 57'; Rajković (yellow card) 83'	Stadium: Arena Khimki; Attendance: 831; Referee: Aleksei Matyunin

27 February 2021 20	Khimki	2–1	Ufa	Khimki
17:00 MSK (UTC+3)	Kukharchuk (yellow card) 21' (yellow-red card) 74'; Bozhenov (yellow card) 34'; Troshechkin (yellow card) 40'; Konaté 49' (yellow card) 60'; Glushakov 62'	Report	Kamilov (yellow card) 7' (goal) 90+'	Stadium: Arena Khimki; Attendance: 539; Referee: Artyom Lyubimov

6 March 2021 21	Rotor Volgograd	0–0	Khimki	Volgograd
17:30 SAMT (UTC+4)	Pesegov (yellow card) 31'; Ponce (yellow card) 51'; Gogoua (yellow card) 88'; Mayewski (yellow card) 90+'	Report		Stadium: Volgograd Arena; Attendance: 5,369; Referee: Sergey Ivanov

12 March 2021 22	Khimki	1–0	Rostov	Khimki
19:00 MSK (UTC+3)	Kamyshev (yellow card) 32'; Mirzov 49' (pen.); Troshechkin (yellow card) 77' (yellow-red card) 89'	Report	Almqvist (yellow card) 67'	Stadium: Arena Khimki; Attendance: 1,092; Referee: Sergey Lapochkin

19 March 2021 23	Rubin Kazan	1–3	Khimki	Kazan
19:00 MSK (UTC+3)	Despotović (yellow card) 19' (goal) 42'; Zotov (yellow card) 45+'; Kvaratskhelia (yellow card) 53'; Bakayev (yellow card) 90+'	Report	Mirzov 20' (pen.); Mogilevets 28' (yellow card) 65'; Dagerstål (yellow card) 64'; Kukharchuk 75'; Tikhiy (yellow card) 80'	Stadium: Ak Bars Arena; Attendance: 5,937; Referee: Aleksei Matyunin

5 April 2021 24	Zenit St.Petersburg	2–0	Khimki	Saint Petersburg
19:00 MSK (UTC+3)	Lovren (yellow card) 10'; Karavayev 45+'; Azmoun (yellow card) 86'; Mostovoy 90+'	Report	Idowu (yellow card) 66'	Stadium: Krestovsky Stadium; Attendance: 20,708; Referee: Pavel Shadykhanov

10 April 2021 25	Khimki	1–0	Tambov	Khimki
14:00 MSK (UTC+3)	Glushakov 59'	Report	Arkhipov (yellow card) 5'	Stadium: Arena Khimki; Attendance: 1,230; Referee: Vladislav Bezborodov

17 April 2021 26	Akhmat Grozny	3–1	Khimki	Grozny
14:00 MSK (UTC+3)	Kharin (yellow card) 9' (goal) 26'; Nenakhov (yellow card) 30'; Ilyin (penalty missed) 34' 44'; Almási (yellow card) 56'; Melkadze 65'; Timofeyev (yellow card) 75'; Shvets (yellow card) 90'; Sadulayev (yellow card) 90+'	Report	Sebai (yellow card) 38'; Danilkin (yellow card) 44'; Idowu 88' (yellow card) 90+'	Stadium: Akhmat-Arena; Attendance: 3,574; Referee: Vasily Kazartsev

24 April 2021 27	Dynamo Moscow	0–1	Khimki	Moscow
19:00 MSK (UTC+3)		Report	Sebai (yellow card) 45+'; Dagerstål (yellow card) 51'; Filin (yellow card) 75'; Glushenkov 90+'	Stadium: VTB Arena; Attendance: 11,327; Referee: Evgeny Kukulyak

2 May 2021 28	Khimki	1–0	Ural Yekaterinburg	Khimki
14:00 MSK (UTC+3)	Konaté 10'; Troshechkin (red card) 15'; Danilkin (yellow card) 31'	Report	Bicfalvi (yellow card) 78'; Yevseyev (yellow card) 82'; Ibrahimaj (yellow card) 85'	Stadium: Arena Khimki; Attendance: 1,505; Referee: Vladimir Moskalyov

10 May 2021 29	Spartak Moscow	2–1	Khimki	Moscow
19:00 MSK (UTC+3)	Kutepov (yellow card) 2'; Ponce (yellow card) 39'; Dzhikiya (yellow card) 45+2'; Sobolev 54'; Larsson 89' (yellow card) 90+2'	Report	Glushenkov (yellow card) 6' (red card) 37' (goal) 27'; Sebai (yellow card) 14'; Danilkin (yellow card) 23'; Bozhenov (yellow card) 41'; Lantratov (yellow card) 74'	Stadium: Otkritie Arena; Attendance: 9,649; Referee: Vladislav Bezborodov

16 May 2021 30	Khimki	0–0	Sochi	Khimki
14:00 MSK (UTC+3)	Konaté (yellow card) 18'	Report	Prutsev (yellow card) 73'	Stadium: Arena Khimki; Attendance: 5,450; Referee: Sergey Ivanov

=== Russian Cup ===
==== Round of 32 ====
Pos	Team	Pld	W	PW	PL	L	GF	GA	GD	Pts	Final result
1	Khimki (Q)	2	1	1	0	0	2	1	+1	5	Advance to Play-off
2	Nizhny Novgorod (E)	2	0	1	1	0	1	1	0	3	
3	Zenit Irkutsk (E)	2	0	0	1	1	0	1	−1	1	

Rules for classification: 1) Points; 2) Wins; 3) Goal differential; 4) Goals scored; 5) Head-to-head result; 6) Disciplinary points.
(E) Eliminated; (Q) Qualified to the phase indicated

15 September 2020 1	Zenit Irkutsk	0–1	Khimki	Irkutsk
13:00 MSK (UTC+3)		Report	Vorobyov (yellow card) 47'; Konaté 64'; Gapon (yellow card) 86'; Generalov (yellow card) 90+3'	Stadium: Trud Stadium; Referee: Aleksandr Sedinkin

21 October 2020 2	Nizhny Novgorod	1–1 (a.e.t.) (9–10 p)	Khimki	Nizhny Novgorod
16:00 MSK (UTC+3)	Temnikov (yellow card) 37'; Gashchenkov (yellow card) 39'; Stavpets 52'; Michurenkov (yellow card) 69'	Report	Tikhiy (yellow card) 51'; Tikhonov (yellow card) 66'; Konaté 75'; Logashov (yellow card) 84'; Khomich (yellow card) FT	Stadium: Nizhny Novgorod Stadium; Referee: Artyom Lyubimov
	Penalties
	Sapeta (penalty scored); Popov (penalty missed); Suleymanov (penalty scored); Sultonov (penalty scored); Gotsuk (penalty scored); Anisimov (penalty scored); Shumskikh (penalty scored); Komolov (penalty scored); Kalinsky (penalty scored); Kakkoyev (penalty scored); Temnikov (penalty missed)		Mogilevets (penalty scored); Kamyshev (penalty scored); Idowu (penalty scored); Logashov (penalty missed); Mirzov (penalty scored); Gapon (penalty scored); Konaté (penalty scored); Tikhiy (penalty scored); Kukharchuk (penalty scored); Glushakov (penalty scored); Khomich (penalty scored)

==== Knockout stages ====
22 February 2021 Round of 16	Khimki	0–4	Krylia Sovetov	Khimki
14:30 MSK (UTC+3)	Tikhiy (yellow card) 6'; Tikhonov (red card) 18'; Idowu (yellow card) 21'; Bozhenov (yellow card) 27'; Mirzov (yellow card) 75' Aliyev (yellow card) 88'	Report	Sergeyev 8' (pen.); Bozhin (yellow card) 42'; Tsypchenko 62'; Golenkov 89'; Chernov 90+3'	Stadium: Arena Khimki; Attendance: 800; Referee: Mikhail Vilkov

== Statistics ==
As of match played 16 May 2021

=== Appearances and goals ===
No.	Pos	Nat	Player	Total		Premier League		Russian Cup	
No.	Pos	Nat	Player	Apps	Goals	Apps	Goals	Apps	Goals
1	GK	(Russia) RUS	Dmitri Khomich	2	0	0	0	2	0
2	DF	(Russia) RUS	Arseny Logashov	8	0	5+2	0	1	0
3	DF	(Sweden) SWE	Filip Dagerstål	10	0	9+1	0	0	0
4	DF	(Nigeria) NGR	Brian Idowu	30	3	28	3	1+1	0
5	MF	(Russia) RUS	Aleksandr Troshechkin	25	2	22+2	2	1	0
6	DF	(Russia) RUS	Dmitri Tikhiy	30	0	28	0	2	0
7	MF	(Russia) RUS	Gela Zaseyev	2	0	0+1	0	0+1	0
8	MF	(Russia) RUS	Denis Glushakov	18	3	14+2	3	1+1	0
9	MF	(Russia) RUS	Maksim Glushenkov	5	2	2+3	2	0	0
10	FW	(Azerbaijan) AZE	Kamran Aliyev	14	1	4+7	1	2+1	0
11	FW	(Russia) RUS	Reziuan Mirzov	19	6	14+3	6	1+1	0
13	FW	(Belarus) BLR	Mikalay Signevich	3	0	0+2	0	1	0
15	DF	(Russia) RUS	Yegor Danilkin	30	1	28+1	1	1	0
17	FW	(Armenia) ARM	Arshak Koryan	14	4	9+5	4	0	0
19	FW	(Ivory Coast) CIV	Senin Sebai	8	0	5+3	0	0	0
21	MF	(Russia) RUS	Ilya Kamyshev	9	0	3+4	0	0+2	0
22	GK	(Russia) RUS	Ilya Lantratov	31	0	30	0	1	0
25	DF	(Ukraine) UKR	Oleksandr Filin	16	0	16	0	0	0
28	MF	(Russia) RUS	Pavel Mogilevets	15	1	7+6	1	1+1	0
42	DF	(Russia) RUS	Mikhail Tikhonov	8	0	2+3	0	3	0
44	FW	(Russia) RUS	Ilya Kukharchuk	24	5	16+5	5	2+1	0
45	FW	(Burkina Faso) BFA	Mohamed Konaté	29	5	15+11	3	2+1	2
47	FW	(Russia) RUS	Aleksandr Dolgov	7	1	2+4	1	1	0
63	MF	(Russia) RUS	Danil Kazantsev	4	0	2+1	0	1	0
70	MF	(Russia) RUS	Andrei Murnin	5	0	2+2	0	1	0
80	FW	(Russia) RUS	Maksim Zhumabekov	1	0	0	0	0+1	0
87	DF	(Russia) RUS	Kirill Bozhenov	27	1	26	1	1	0
88	FW	(Russia) RUS	Vladimir Dyadyun	15	0	12+3	0	0	0
	FW	(Russia) RUS	Danil Massurenko	1	0	0	0	0+1	0
Players away from the club on loan:
Players who left Khimki during the season:
9	MF	(Russia) RUS	Maksim Martusevich	7	0	4+2	0	0+1	0
11	MF	(Russia) RUS	Aleksandr Lomovitsky	8	2	6+2	2	0	0
13	FW	(Belarus) BLR	Mikalay Signevich	3	0	0+2	0	1	0
14	MF	(Ukraine) UKR	Artem Polyarus	8	0	7+1	0	0	0
18	DF	(Russia) RUS	Danil Lipovoy	10	0	1+7	0	2	0
20	MF	(Kazakhstan) KAZ	Islambek Kuat	7	0	5+1	0	1	0
33	DF	(Russia) RUS	Yevgeny Gapon	8	0	5+1	0	2	0
51	DF	(Russia) RUS	Sergei Mizgiryov	1	0	0	0	1	0
84	FW	(Russia) RUS	Ilya Vorobyov	4	0	0+3	0	1	0

=== Goalscorers ===
Place	Position	Nation	Number	Name	Premier League	Russian Cup	Total
1	FW	(Russia)	11	Reziuan Mirzov	6	0	6
2	FW	(Russia)	44	Ilya Kukharchuk	5	0	5
2	FW	(Burkina Faso)	45	Mohamed Konaté	3	2	5
4	FW	(Armenia)	17	Arshak Koryan	4	0	4
5	MF	(Russia)	8	Denis Glushakov	3	0	3
5	DF	(Nigeria)	4	Brian Idowu	3	0	3
7	MF	(Russia)	11	Aleksandr Lomovitsky	2	0	2
7	MF	(Russia)	5	Aleksandr Troshechkin	2	0	2
7	MF	(Russia)	9	Maksim Glushenkov	2	0	2
10	DF	(Russia)	15	Yegor Danilkin	1	0	1
10	FW	(Azerbaijan)	10	Kamran Aliyev	1	0	1
10	DF	(Russia)	87	Kirill Bozhenov	1	0	1
10	FW	(Russia)	47	Aleksandr Dolgov	1	0	1
10	MF	(Russia)	28	Pavel Mogilevets	1	0	1
				TOTALS	35	2	37

=== Clean sheets ===
Place	Position	Nation	Number	Name	Premier League	Russian Cup	Total
1	GK	(Russia)	22	Ilya Lantratov	11	0	11
2	GK	(Russia)	1	Dmitri Khomich	0	1	1
				TOTALS	11	1	12

=== Disciplinary record ===
Number	Nation	Position	Name	Premier League		Russian Cup		Total	
Number	Nation	Position	Name	Yellow card	Red card	Yellow card	Red card	Yellow card	Red card
1	(Russia)	GK	Dmitri Khomich	0	0	2	0	2	0
2	(Russia)	DF	Arseny Logashov	1	0	1	0	2	0
3	(Sweden)	DF	Filip Dagerstål	2	0	0	0	2	0
4	(Nigeria)	DF	Brian Idowu	8	1	1	0	9	1
5	(Russia)	MF	Aleksandr Troshechkin	10	2	0	0	10	2
6	(Russia)	DF	Dmitri Tikhiy	6	0	2	0	8	0
8	(Russia)	MF	Denis Glushakov	4	0	0	0	4	0
9	(Russia)	MF	Maksim Glushenkov	1	1	0	0	1	1
10	(Azerbaijan)	FW	Kamran Aliyev	1	0	1	0	2	0
11	(Russia)	FW	Reziuan Mirzov	3	0	1	0	4	0
15	(Russia)	DF	Yegor Danilkin	6	0	0	0	6	0
17	(Armenia)	FW	Arshak Koryan	2	0	0	0	2	0
19	(Ivory Coast)	FW	Senin Sebai	3	0	0	0	3	0
21	(Russia)	MF	Ilya Kamyshev	1	0	0	0	1	0
22	(Russia)	GK	Ilya Lantratov	2	0	0	0	2	0
25	(Ukraine)	DF	Oleksandr Filin	3	0	0	0	3	0
28	(Russia)	MF	Pavel Mogilevets	1	0	0	0	1	0
42	(Russia)	DF	Mikhail Tikhonov	0	1	1	0	1	1
44	(Russia)	FW	Ilya Kukharchuk	7	1	0	0	7	1
45	(Burkina Faso)	FW	Mohamed Konaté	5	0	0	0	5	0
63	(Russia)	MF	Danil Kazantsev	2	1	0	0	2	1
70	(Russia)	MF	Andrei Murnin	2	0	0	0	2	0
87	(Russia)	DF	Kirill Bozhenov	6	1	1	0	7	1
88	(Russia)	FW	Vladimir Dyadyun	4	0	0	0	4	0
Players away on loan:
Players who left Khimki during the season:
11	(Russia)	MF	Aleksandr Lomovitsky	1	0	0	0	1	0
14	(Ukraine)	MF	Artem Polyarus	3	0	0	0	3	0
20	(Kazakhstan)	MF	Islambek Kuat	3	0	0	0	3	0
33	(Russia)	DF	Yevgeny Gapon	2	0	1	0	3	0
84	(Russia)	FW	Ilya Vorobyov	0	0	1	0	1	0
			TOTALS	89	7	12	1	101	8
