= Georgy Karginov =

Russian footballer

Personal information
- Full name: Georgy Alanovich Karginov
- Date of birth: 29 January 2001 (age 25)
- Place of birth: Vladikavkaz, Russia
- Height: 1.76 m (5 ft 9 in)
- Position: Attacking midfielder

Team information
- Current team: Nart Cherkessk
- Number: 15

Youth career
- –2019: Spartak Vladikavkaz
- 2019–2021: Zenit St. Petersburg

Senior career*
Years	Team	Apps	(Gls)
2019	Spartak Vladikavkaz	3	(0)
2020–2022	Zenit-2 St. Petersburg	15	(0)
2023	Khimki	1	(0)
2023	Khimki-M	5	(0)
2023	Astrakhan	4	(0)
2024–2025	Kyzyltash Bakhchisaray		
2025	Alania Vladikavkaz	2	(0)
2025	Kyzyltash Bakhchisaray		
2025–	Nart Cherkessk	45	(3)
- * Club domestic league appearances and goals as of 31 October 2026

Georgy Alanovich Karginov (Russian: Георгий Аланович Каргинов; born 29 January 2001) is a Russian football player who plays as an attacking midfielder for Nart Cherkessk.

== Career ==
He made his debut in the Russian Premier League for Khimki on 2 April 2023 in a game against Krasnodar.
