= Yegor Danilkin =

Russian professional football player

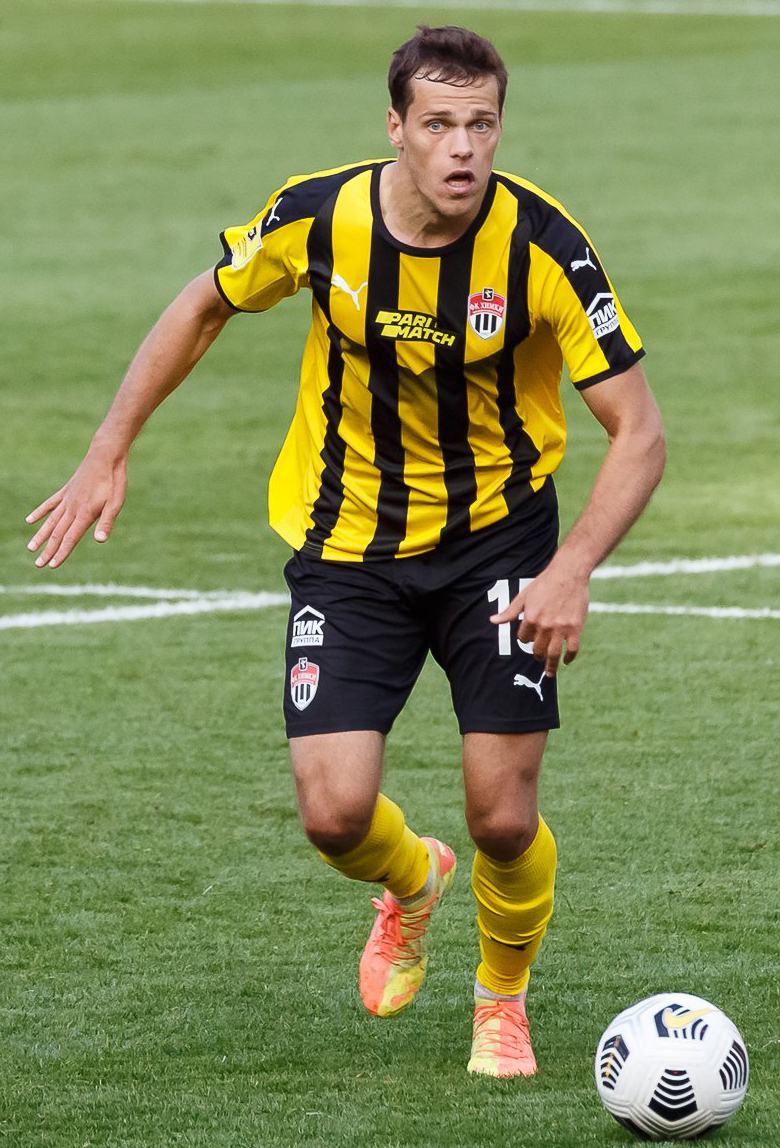
- Danilkin with Khimki in 2020

Personal information
- Full name: Yegor Romanovich Danilkin
- Date of birth: 1 August 1995 (age 31)
- Place of birth: Vladimir, Russia
- Height: 1.85 m (6 ft 1 in)
- Position: Centre back

Team information
- Current team: Rotor Volgograd
- Number: 15

Youth career
- 2004–2007: Lokomotiv Moscow
- 2008–2010: Khimki
- 2010–2014: Dynamo Moscow

Senior career*
Years	Team	Apps	(Gls)
2015–2017	Dynamo Moscow	3	(0)
2016–2017	→ Dynamo-2 Moscow	15	(0)
2018–2022	Khimki	118	(3)
2018	→ Khimki-M	1	(0)
2023	Volga Ulyanovsk	10	(0)
2023–2024	Akron Tolyatti	33	(1)
2024–2026	Torpedo Moscow	35	(0)
2026–	Rotor Volgograd	8	(0)
- * Club domestic league appearances and goals as of 16 May 2026

Yegor Romanovich Danilkin (Russian: Его́р Рома́нович Дани́лкин; born 1 August 1995) is a Russian professional football player who plays as a centre back for Rotor Volgograd.

== Club career ==
He made his professional debut on 18 May 2015 for Dynamo Moscow in a Russian Premier League game against Ural Yekaterinburg.

In February 2023, it became known that Danilkin became a Volga Ulyanovsk player.

== Career statistics ==
As of 24 May 2025

Club	Season	League			Cup		Continental		Other		Total	
Club	Season	Division	Apps	Goals	Apps	Goals	Apps	Goals	Apps	Goals	Apps	Goals
Dynamo Moscow	2013–14	Russian Premier League	0	0	0	0	–		–		0	0
Dynamo Moscow	2014–15	Russian Premier League	1	0	0	0	0	0	–		1	0
Dynamo Moscow	2015–16	Russian Premier League	2	0	0	0	–		–		2	0
Dynamo Moscow	Total		3	0	0	0	0	0	0	0	3	0
Dynamo-2 Moscow	2016–17	Russian Second League	15	0	–		–		–		15	0
Khimki	2017–18	Russian First League	10	1	–		–		–		10	1
Khimki	2018–19	Russian First League	33	1	2	0	–		4 (Note: Appearances in the FNL Cup)	0	39	1
Khimki	2019–20	Russian First League	26	0	6	0	–		5	0	37	0
Khimki	2020–21	Russian Premier League	29	1	1	0	–		–		30	1
Khimki	2021–22	Russian Premier League	15	0	1	0	–		–		16	0
Khimki	2022–23	Russian Premier League	5	0	3	0	–		–		8	0
Khimki	Total		118	3	13	0	0	0	9	0	140	3
Khimki-M	2018–19	Russian Second League	1	0	–		–		–		1	0
Volga Ulyanovsk	2022–23	Russian First League	10	0	1	0	–		–		11	0
Akron Tolyatti	2023–24	Russian First League	33	1	3	0	–		2 (Note: Appearances in the promotion play-offs)	0	38	1
Torpedo Moscow	2024–25	Russian First League	22	0	0	0	–		–		22	0
Career total			202	4	17	0	0	0	11	0	230	4
