= Mikhail Tikhonov (footballer) =

Russian footballer

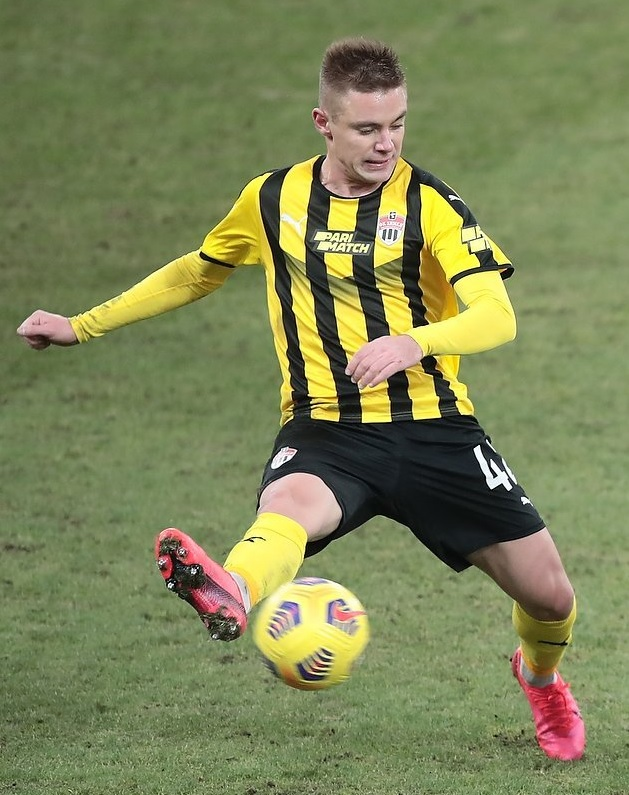
- Tikhonov with FC Khimki in 2020

Personal information
- Full name: Mikhail Andreyevich Tikhonov
- Date of birth: 17 July 1998 (age 28)
- Place of birth: Moscow, Russia
- Height: 1.76 m (5 ft 9 in)
- Position: Defender

Team information
- Current team: Istiklol
- Number: 77

Youth career
- –2009: Khimki
- 2009–2011: TsDYuS Mytishchi
- 2011–2015: Spartak Moscow
- 2015–2016: Krasnodar

Senior career*
Years	Team	Apps	(Gls)
2016–2017	Yenisey Krasnoyarsk	6	(0)
2017–2019	Krylia Sovetov Samara	5	(0)
2017–2018	Krylia Sovetov-2 Samara	7	(0)
2019–2021	Khimki	5	(0)
2019–2021	Khimki-M	30	(1)
2021–2022	SKA-Khabarovsk	23	(1)
2022–2023	Rodina Moscow	2	(0)
2022–2023	Rodina-2 Moscow	8	(0)
2023	→ Chayka Peschanokopskoye (loan)	8	(2)
2023	Rodina-M Moscow	13	(1)
2024	Pari NN	0	(0)
2024	Pari NN-2	7	(0)
2024–2026	Yenisey Krasnoyarsk	28	(1)
2026–	Istiklol	6	(0)
- * Club domestic league appearances and goals as of 16 November 2026

Mikhail Andreyevich Tikhonov (Russian: Михаил Андреевич Тихонов; born 17 July 1998) is a Russian football player who plays as right-back or right midfielder for Istiklol in the Tajikistan Higher League.

== Career ==
He made his professional debut in the Russian Cup for Yenisey Krasnoyarsk on 24 August 2016 in a game against Dynamo Barnaul.

He made his Russian Football National League debut for Yenisey Krasnoyarsk on 10 September 2016 in a game against Khimki.

He made his Russian Premier League debut with Krylia Sovetov Samara on 11 August 2018 as a last-minute substitute in a game against Rostov.

On 20 August 2021, he signed a one-year contract with SKA-Khabarovsk.

On 30 July 2026, Tajikistan Higher League club Istiklol announced the signing of Tikhonov on a contract until the end of the season.

== Personal life ==
Mikhail is a son of Andrey Tikhonov. He's been coached by his father at Krylia Sovetov Samara and Yenisey Krasnoyarsk.

== Career statistics ==
As of match played 7 November 2026

Club	Season	League			Cup		Continental		Other		Total	
Club	Season	Division	Apps	Goals	Apps	Goals	Apps	Goals	Apps	Goals	Apps	Goals
Yenisey Krasnoyarsk	2016–17	Russian First League	6	0	1	0	–		4 (Note: Appearances in FNL Cup)	0	11	0
Krylia Sovetov Samara	2017–18	Russian First League	4	0	0	0	–		4	0	8	0
Krylia Sovetov Samara	2018–19	Russian Premier League	1	0	0	0	–		–		1	0
Krylia Sovetov Samara	Total		5	0	0	0	-	-	4	0	9	0
Krylia Sovetov-2 Samara	2017–18	Russian Second League	7	0	–		–		–		7	0
Khimki	2019–20	Russian First League	0	0	0	0	–		–		0	0
Khimki	2020–21	Russian Premier League	5	0	3	0	–		–		8	0
Khimki	Total		5	0	3	0	-	-	0	0	8	0
Khimki-M	2019–20	Russian Second League	16	1	–		–		–		16	1
Khimki-M	2020–21	Russian Second League	10	0	–		–		–		10	0
Khimki-M	2021–22	Russian Second League	4	0	–		–		–		4	0
Khimki-M	Total		30	1	0	0	-	-	0	0	30	1
SKA-Khabarovsk	2021–22	Russian First League	23	1	–		–		2 (Note: Appearances in promotion play-offs)	0	25	1
Rodina Moscow	2022–23	Russian First League	2	0	0	0	–		–		2	0
Rodina-2 Moscow	2022–23	Russian Second League	8	0	–		–		–		8	0
Chayka (loan)	2022–23	Russian Second League	8	2	–		–		–		8	2
Rodina-M Moscow	2023	Russian Second League B	13	1	–		–		–		13	1
Pari NN	2023–24	Russian Premier League	0	0	–		–		0	0	0	0
Pari NN-2	2024	Russian Second League B	7	0	–		–		–		7	0
Yenisey Krasnoyarsk	2024–25	Russian First League	23	1	0	0	–		–		23	1
Yenisey Krasnoyarsk	2025–26	Russian First League	5	0	1	0	–		–		6	0
Yenisey Krasnoyarsk	Total		28	1	1	0	-	-	0	0	29	1
Istiklol	2026	Tajikistan Higher League	6	0	0	0	1 (Note: Appearances in AFC Challenge League)	0	0 (Note: Appearances in Tajik Supercup)	0	7	0
Career total			148	6	5	0	1	0	10	0	164	6
