= Yegor Generalov =

Russian footballer

Personal information
- Full name: Yegor Dmitriyevich Generalov
- Date of birth: 24 January 1993 (age 33)
- Place of birth: Smarhonʹ, Grodno Oblast, Belarus
- Height: 1.87 m (6 ft 2 in)
- Position: Goalkeeper

Team information
- Current team: GSK Gorodeya

Youth career
- Dinamo Minsk
- FShM Moscow
- 2009–2010: Lokomotiv Moscow
- 2011–2014: Dynamo Moscow

Senior career*
Years	Team	Apps	(Gls)
2014–2016	Dynamo Moscow	0	(0)
2014–2015	→ Saturn Ramenskoye (loan)	16	(0)
2015–2016	→ Dynamo Saint Petersburg (loan)	22	(0)
2016–2018	Dynamo Saint Petersburg	52	(0)
2018–2019	SKA-Khabarovsk	20	(0)
2019–2022	Khimki	9	(0)
2019–2021	→ Khimki-M	7	(0)
2022	Minsk	6	(0)
2023	Isloch Minsk Raion	1	(0)
2023–2024	Dnepr Mogilev	43	(0)
2025	Uzda		
2025–	GSK Gorodeya		

International career
2009	Russia U16	2	(0)
2011	Russia U18	3	(0)
2011	Russia U19	2	(0)
2012	Russia U21	1	(0)
- * Club domestic league appearances and goals as of 4 December 2024

Yegor Dmitriyevich Generalov (Russian: Егор Дмитриевич Генералов; born 24 January 1993) is a Russian football player who plays for Belarusian club GSK Gorodeya.

== Club career ==
Generalov made his professional debut in the Russian Professional Football League for FC Saturn Ramenskoye on 8 August 2014 in a game against FC Domodedovo Moscow.

He made his Russian Football National League debut for FC Dynamo Saint Petersburg on 8 July 2017 in a game against FC Yenisey Krasnoyarsk.

== Career statistics ==
As of 28 May 2022

Club	Season	League			Cup		Continental		Other		Total	
Club	Season	Division	Apps	Goals	Apps	Goals	Apps	Goals	Apps	Goals	Apps	Goals
Saturn Ramenskoye	2014–15	PFL	16	0	0	0	–		–		16	0
Dynamo St. Petersburg	2015–16	PFL	22	0	1	0	–		–		23	0
Dynamo St. Petersburg	2016–17	PFL	19	0	0	0	–		3 (Note: Appearances in the FNL Cup)	0	22	0
Dynamo St. Petersburg	2017–18	FNL	33	0	1	0	–		–		34	0
Dynamo St. Petersburg	Total		74	0	2	0	0	0	3	0	79	0
SKA-Khabarovsk	2018–19	FNL	20	0	2	0	–		–		22	0
Khimki-M	2019–20	PFL	4	0	–		–		–		4	0
Khimki-M	2020–21	PFL	3	0	–		–		–		3	0
Khimki-M	Total		7	0	0	0	0	0	0	0	7	0
Khimki	2019–20	FNL	9	0	1	0	–		3	0	13	0
Khimki	2020–21	RPL	0	0	1	0	–		–		1	0
Khimki	2021–22	RPL	0	0	0	0	–		–		0	0
Khimki	Total		9	0	2	0	0	0	3	0	14	0
Career total			126	0	6	0	0	0	6	0	138	0
