= Roman Manushin =

Russian footballer

Personal information
- Full name: Roman Mikhailovich Manushin
- Date of birth: 6 January 1977 (age 49)
- Height: 1.76 m (5 ft 9 1/2 in)
- Position: Midfielder

Senior career*
Years	Team	Apps	(Gls)
1993	FC Nart Cherkessk	2	(0)
1994–2001	FC Dynamo Stavropol	97	(8)
1994–1997	→ FC Dynamo-d Stavropol (loans)	86	(9)
2001–2004	FC Chkalovets-1936 Novosibirsk	48	(5)
2010–2011	FC SevKavGTU Stavropol		
- * Club domestic league appearances and goals

Roman Mikhailovich Manushin (Russian: Роман Михайлович Манушин; born 6 January 1977) is a former Russian football player.
