= Danil Kazantsev =

Russian footballer

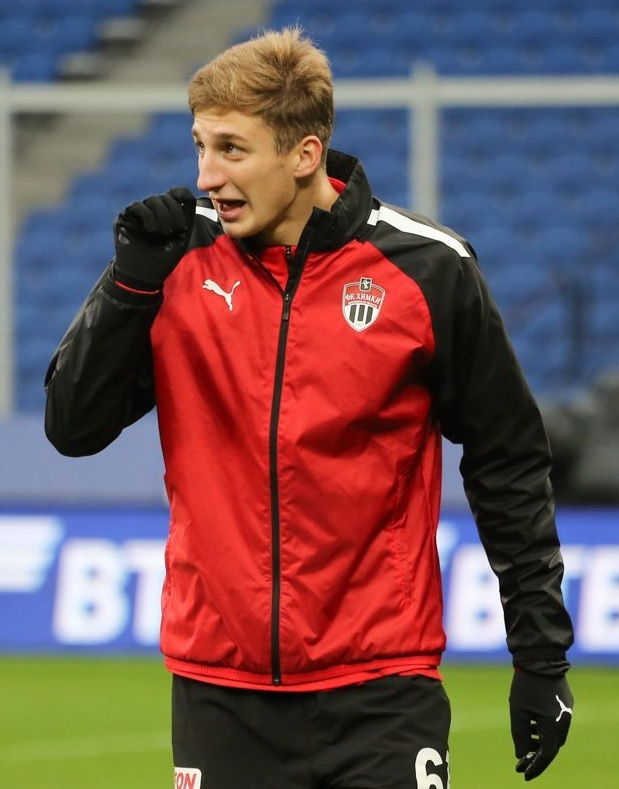
- Kazantsev with Khimki in 2022

Personal information
- Full name: Danil Antonovich Kazantsev
- Date of birth: 5 January 2001 (age 25)
- Place of birth: Syzran, Russia
- Height: 1.87 m (6 ft 2 in)
- Position: Defensive midfielder

Youth career
- UOR #5 Yegoryevsk

Senior career*
Years	Team	Apps	(Gls)
2019–2023	Khimki	10	(0)
2019–2023	Khimki-M	34	(1)
2023–2024	Sokol Saratov	18	(0)
2024	Ryazan	7	(0)
2025	Alania Vladikavkaz	10	(1)
2025–2026	Irtysh Omsk	18	(0)
- * Club domestic league appearances and goals as of 13 June 2026

Danil Antonovich Kazantsev (Russian: Данил Антонович Казанцев; born 5 January 2001) is a Russian football player who plays as a defensive midfielder.

== Club career ==
He made his Russian Premier League debut for Khimki on 25 August 2020 in a game against Arsenal Tula. He started the game and was sent-off in the second half for two cautions.

== Career statistics ==
As of 27 November 2022

Club	Season	League			Cup		Continental		Total	
Club	Season	Division	Apps	Goals	Apps	Goals	Apps	Goals	Apps	Goals
Khimki-M	2019–20	Second League	16	0	–		–		16	0
Khimki-M	2020–21	Second League	6	1	–		–		6	1
Khimki-M	2021–22	Second League	2	0	–		–		2	0
Khimki-M	2022–23	Second League	7	0	–		–		7	0
Khimki-M	Total		31	1	0	0	0	0	31	1
Khimki	2020–21	RPL	3	0	1	0	–		4	0
Khimki	2021–22	RPL	0	0	0	0	–		0	0
Khimki	2022–23	RPL	5	0	4	0	–		9	0
Khimki	Total		8	0	5	0	0	0	13	0
Career total			39	1	5	0	0	0	44	1
