= Dmitri Kotov =

Russian footballer

Personal information
- Full name: Dmitri Denisovich Kotov
- Date of birth: 22 November 2000 (age 25)
- Place of birth: Tula, Russia
- Height: 1.68 m (5 ft 6 in)
- Position: Forward

Team information
- Current team: Nart Cherkessk
- Number: 17

Youth career
- Arsenal Tula
- 2013–2019: Krasnodar

Senior career*
| Years | Team | Apps | (Gls) |
| 2018–2021 | Krasnodar-3 | 42 | (1) |
| 2020–2021 | Krasnodar-2 | 7 | (0) |
| 2021–2024 | Dynamo Vladivostok | 73 | (4) |
| 2024 | Dynamo Bryansk | 16 | (1) |
| 2024 | Chayka | 4 | (0) |
| 2025 | Kuban-Holding | 26 | (2) |
| 2026 | Kuban Krasnodar | 9 | (0) |
| 2026– | Nart Cherkessk | 10 | (0) |
- * Club domestic league appearances and goals as of 31 October 2026

Dmitri Denisovich Kotov (Russian: Дмитрий Денисович Котов; born 22 November 2000) is a Russian football player who plays for Nart Cherkessk.

== Club career ==
He made his debut in the Russian Football National League for Krasnodar-2 on 4 October 2020 in a game against Nizhny Novgorod.
