= Alan Lelyukayev =

Russian footballer

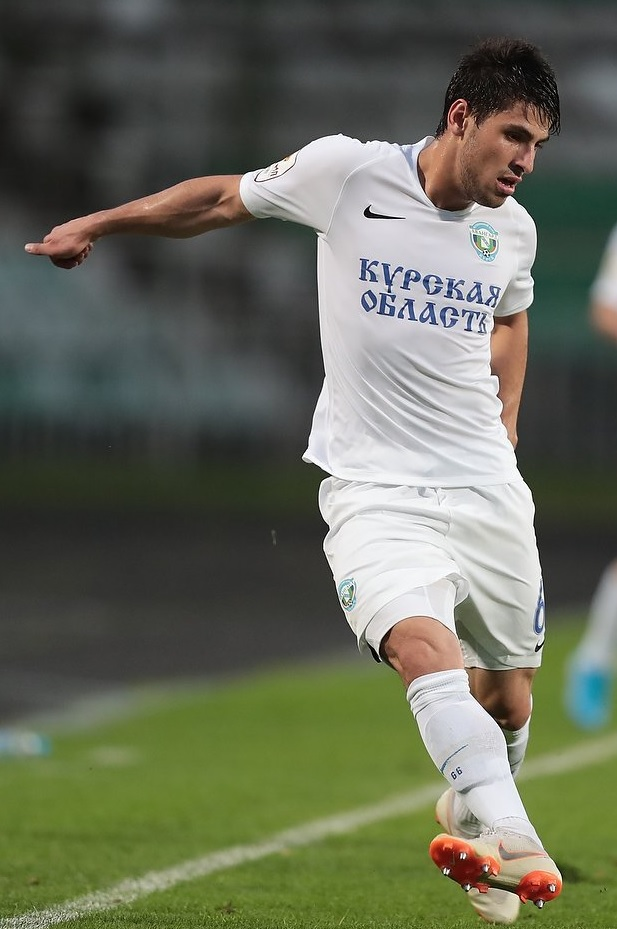
- Lelyukayev with Avangard Kursk in 2019

Personal information
- Full name: Alan Khamidovich Lelyukayev
- Date of birth: 13 November 1999 (age 26)
- Height: 1.74 m (5 ft 9 in)
- Position: Defender

Team information
- Current team: Nart Cherkessk
- Number: 71

Senior career*
Years	Team	Apps	(Gls)
2015–2016	Spartak Nalchik	1	(0)
2017–2019	Spartak Nalchik	47	(0)
2019	Avangard Kursk	15	(0)
2020–2021	Neftekhimik Nizhnekamsk	21	(0)
2021–2022	SKA Rostov-on-Don	16	(2)
2022–2023	Spartak Nalchik	11	(0)
2023	Dynamo Makhachkala	0	(0)
2023–2024	Mashuk-KMV Pyatigorsk	4	(0)
2024	Spartak Nalchik	29	(0)
2025	Nart Cherkessk	31	(0)
2026–	Nart Cherkessk	12	(0)
- * Club domestic league appearances and goals as of 31 October 2026

Alan Khamidovich Lelyukayev (Russian: Алан Хамидович Лелюкаев; born 13 November 1999) is a Russian football player who plays for Nart Cherkessk.

== Club career ==
He made his debut in the Russian Professional Football League for Spartak Nalchik on 24 May 2016 in a game against Terek-2 Grozny.

He made his Russian Football National League debut for Avangard Kursk on 13 July 2019 in a game against Khimki.
