= Bogdan Mishukov =

Russian footballer

Personal information
- Full name: Bogdan Vadimovich Mishukov
- Date of birth: 5 February 1997 (age 29)
- Place of birth: Moskovsky, Russia
- Height: 1.84 m (6 ft 0 in)
- Position: Midfielder

Youth career
- FC Lokomotiv Moscow
- 2015–2017: FC Ural Yekaterinburg
- 2017–2018: Leixões

Senior career*
Years	Team	Apps	(Gls)
2018–2020	FC Khimki	7	(1)
2018–2020	→ FC Khimki-M	29	(2)
2020–2021	FC Khimki-M	20	(4)
- * Club domestic league appearances and goals

Bogdan Vadimovich Mishukov (Russian: Богдан Вадимович Мишуков; born 5 February 1997) is a Russian former football player.

== Club career ==
He made his debut in the Russian Football National League for FC Khimki on 17 March 2019 in a game against FC Rotor Volgograd.
