= Ilya Vorobyov (footballer) =

Russian footballer

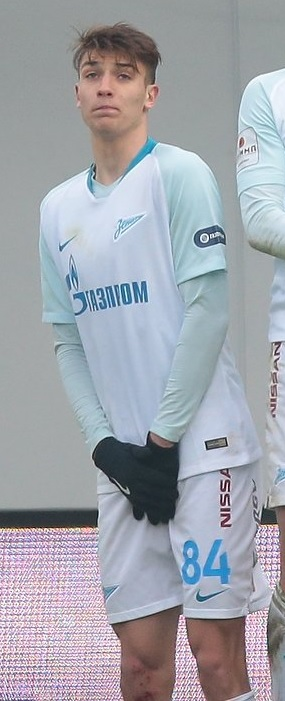
- Vorobyov with Zenit-2 in 2019

Personal information
- Full name: Ilya Lvovich Vorobyov
- Date of birth: 11 July 1999 (age 27)
- Place of birth: Saint Petersburg, Russia
- Height: 1.88 m (6 ft 2 in)
- Positions: Midfielder; forward

Senior career*
Years	Team	Apps	(Gls)
2017–2020	FC Zenit Saint Petersburg	0	(0)
2018–2020	→ FC Zenit-2 Saint Petersburg	53	(13)
2020	→ FC Khimki (loan)	3	(0)
2020	→ FC Khimki-M (loan)	1	(0)
2020–2022	FC Orenburg	16	(0)
2020–2021	→ FC Orenburg-2	3	(0)
2022	→ FC Veles Moscow (loan)	10	(2)
2022–2023	FC Leningradets Leningrad Oblast	25	(5)
2023	FC Rotor Volgograd	10	(0)
2024	FC Spartak Kostroma	5	(0)
2024	FC Murom	2	(0)
2024–2025	FC Dynamo Saint Petersburg	13	(2)
- * Club domestic league appearances and goals as of 5 July 2025

Ilya Lvovich Vorobyov (Russian: Илья Львович Воробьёв; born 11 July 1999) is a Russian football player.

== Club career ==
He made his debut in the Russian Football National League for FC Zenit-2 Saint Petersburg on 17 July 2018 in a game against FC Tambov.

He made his debut for the main squad of FC Zenit Saint Petersburg on 25 September 2019 in a Russian Cup game against FC Yenisey Krasnoyarsk.

On 28 August 2020, he joined FC Khimki on loan for the 2020–21 season. He made his Russian Premier League debut for Khimki on 29 August 2020 in a game against FC Rotor Volgograd.

== Honours ==
=== Club ===
Zenit Saint Petersburg

- Russian Cup: 2019–20
