= Andrei Yevdokimov =

Russian footballer (born 1999)

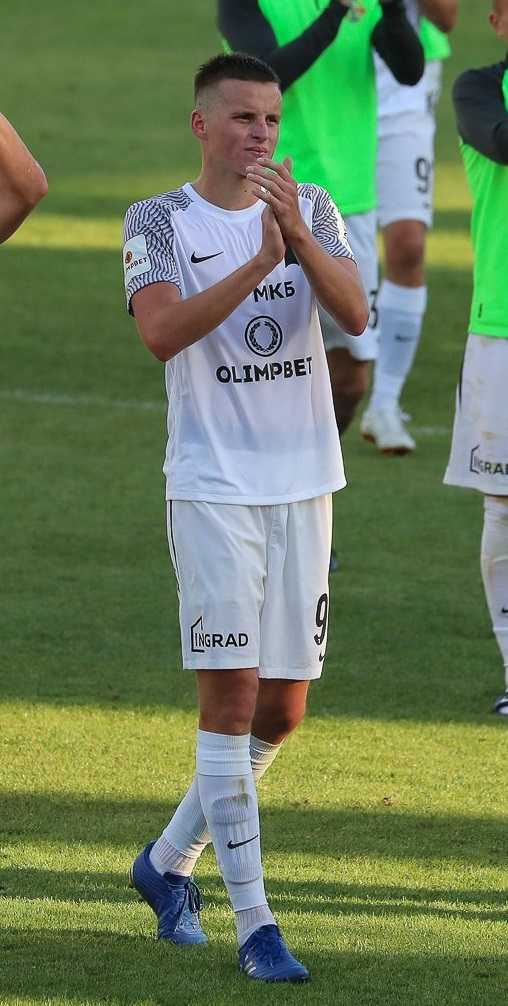
- Yevdokimov with Torpedo Moscow in 2021

Personal information
- Full name: Andrei Vladimirovich Yevdokimov
- Date of birth: 9 March 1999 (age 27)
- Place of birth: Zheleznovodsk, Russia
- Height: 1.92 m (6 ft 4 in)
- Position: Centre-back

Team information
- Current team: Ufa
- Number: 99

Youth career
- –2018: Master-Saturn Yegoryevsk

Senior career*
Years	Team	Apps	(Gls)
2018–2020	Khimki	1	(0)
2018–2020	→ Khimki-M	28	(1)
2020–2023	Torpedo Moscow	60	(5)
2022–2023	→ Torpedo-2	21	(1)
2023–2024	Sokol Saratov	19	(1)
2024–2025	Chayka Peschanokopskoye	28	(0)
2025–2026	Tekstilshchik Ivanovo	35	(1)
2026–	Ufa	0	(0)
- * Club domestic league appearances and goals as of 13 July 2026

Andrei Vladimirovich Yevdokimov (Russian: Андрей Владимирович Евдокимов; born 9 March 1999) is a Russian football player who plays for Ufa.

== Club career ==
He made his debut in the Russian Professional Football League for Khimki-M on 13 October 2018 in a game against Kaluga.

He made his Russian Football National League debut for Khimki on 12 October 2019 in a game against Mordovia Saransk.

== Honours ==
Torpedo Moscow

- Russian Football National League : 2021-22
