= Vladimir Dyadyun =

Russian football striker

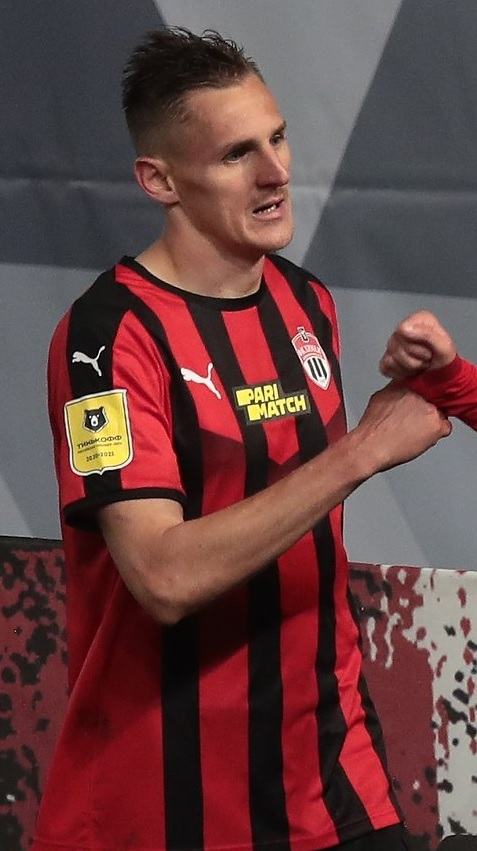
- Dyadyun with FC Khimki in 2020

Personal information
- Full name: Vladimir Sergeyevich Dyadyun
- Date of birth: 12 July 1988 (age 38)
- Place of birth: Omsk, Soviet Union
- Height: 1.83 m (6 ft 0 in)
- Position: Forward

Youth career
- Rubin Kazan

Senior career*
| Years | Team | Apps | (Gls) |
| 2007–2013 | Rubin Kazan | 58 | (11) |
| 2008 | → Rostov (loan) | 32 | (7) |
| 2009 | → Tom Tomsk (loan) | 20 | (0) |
| 2010 | → Spartak Nalchik (loan) | 28 | (10) |
| 2013–2014 | Dynamo Moscow | 19 | (0) |
| 2014–2017 | Rubin Kazan | 36 | (2) |
| 2017–2018 | Rostov | 16 | (1) |
| 2018–2019 | Baltika Kaliningrad | 27 | (5) |
| 2019–2021 | Khimki | 32 | (4) |
| 2022 | Fakel Voronezh | 12 | (1) |

International career
| 2006 | Russia U-18 | 11 | (5) |
| 2007 | Russia U-19 | 6 | (3) |
| 2010 | Russia U-21 | 5 | (0) |
| 2012 | Russia-2 | 2 | (1) |
- * Club domestic league appearances and goals

Vladimir Sergeyevich Dyadyun (Russian: Владимир Сергеевич Дядюн; born 12 July 1988) is a Russian former football striker.

== Club career ==
=== Rubin ===
He made his debut in the Russian Football Premier League in 2007 for Rubin Kazan.

=== Spartak Nalchik ===
In the 2010 Russian Premier League campaign, he scored 4 goals in the first 4 games for Spartak Nalchik, helping his club to take an unexpected lead in the League at that point. He continued his excellent form with his first career hat-trick on 26 September 2010 against Dynamo Moscow, scoring all of the goals in a 3–0 victory.

=== Dynamo ===
In the summer of 2013, Dyadyun signed permanent deal with Dynamo Moscow.

=== Rubin ===
The next year, though, Dyadun returned to the club where he started his professional career.

== International career ==
In October 2011, he was called up to the Russia national football team for the first time.

== Career statistics ==
| Club | Season | League | | | Cup | | Continental | | Other | | Total | |
| Club | Season | Division | Apps | Goals | Apps | Goals | Apps | Goals | Apps | Goals | Apps | Goals |
|---|---|---|---|---|---|---|---|---|---|---|---|---|
| Rubin Kazan | 2007 | Russian Premier League | 5 | 1 | 1 | 0 | 0 | 0 | – | | 6 | 1 |
| Rubin Kazan | 2011–12 | Russian Premier League | 30 | 3 | 4 | 0 | 12 (Note: Four appearances, two goals in the UEFA Champions League, eight appearances, one goal in the UEFA Europa League) | 3 | – | | 46 | 6 |
| Rubin Kazan | 2012–13 | Russian Premier League | 23 | 7 | 1 | 0 | 8 (Note: Appearances in the UEFA Europa League) | 2 | 1 (Note: Appearance in the Russian Super Cup) | 1 | 33 | 10 |
| Rubin Kazan | Total | | 58 | 11 | 6 | 0 | 20 | 5 | 1 | 1 | 85 | 17 |
| Rostov (loan) | 2008 | Russian First League | 32 | 7 | 0 | 0 | – | | – | | 32 | 7 |
| Tom Tomsk (loan) | 2009 | Russian Premier League | 20 | 0 | 0 | 0 | – | | – | | 20 | 0 |
| Spartak Nalchik (loan) | 2010 | Russian Premier League | 28 | 10 | 1 | 0 | – | | – | | 29 | 10 |
| Dynamo Moscow | 2013–14 | Russian Premier League | 19 | 0 | 1 | 0 | – | | – | | 20 | 0 |
| Rubin Kazan | 2014–15 | Russian Premier League | 22 | 2 | 3 | 1 | – | | – | | 25 | 3 |
| Rubin Kazan | 2015–16 | Russian Premier League | 14 | 0 | 0 | 0 | 7 | 0 | – | | 21 | 0 |
| Rubin Kazan | 2016–17 | Russian Premier League | 0 | 0 | 0 | 0 | – | | – | | 0 | 0 |
| Rubin Kazan | Total | | 36 | 2 | 3 | 1 | 7 | 0 | 0 | 0 | 46 | 3 |
| Rostov | 2017–18 | Russian Premier League | 16 | 1 | 1 | 0 | – | | – | | 17 | 1 |
| Baltika Kaliningrad | 2018–19 | Russian First League | 27 | 5 | 1 | 0 | – | | – | | 28 | 5 |
| Khimki | 2019–20 | Russian First League | 17 | 4 | 5 | 3 | – | | – | | 22 | 7 |
| Khimki | 2020–21 | Russian Premier League | 15 | 0 | 0 | 0 | – | | – | | 15 | 0 |
| Khimki | Total | | 32 | 4 | 5 | 3 | 0 | 0 | 0 | 0 | 37 | 7 |
| Fakel Voronezh | 2021–22 | Russian First League | 12 | 1 | – | | – | | – | | 12 | 1 |
| Career total | | | 280 | 41 | 18 | 4 | 27 | 5 | 1 | 1 | 326 | 51 |
