= Aleksandr Troshechkin =

Russian footballer

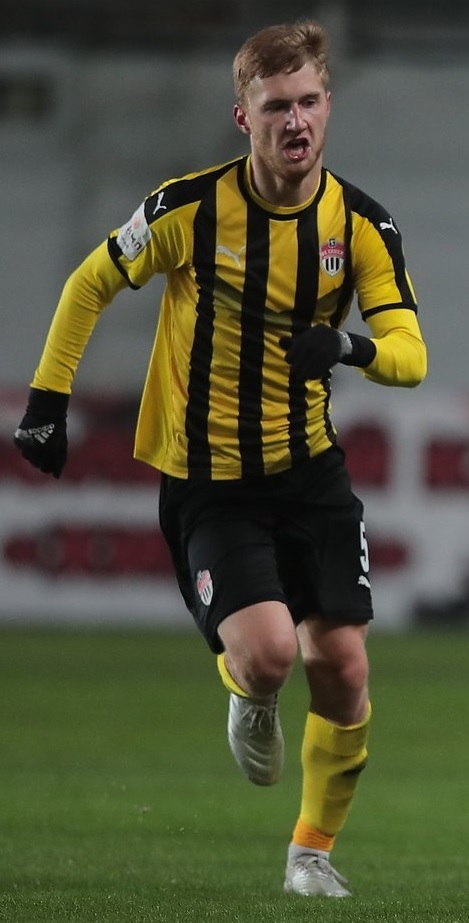
- Troshechkin with Khimki in 2020

Personal information
- Full name: Aleksandr Igorevich Troshechkin
- Date of birth: 23 April 1996 (age 30)
- Place of birth: Moscow, Russia
- Height: 1.83 m (6 ft 0 in)
- Position: Midfielder

Team information
- Current team: Rotor Volgograd
- Number: 5

Youth career
- –2009: Lokomotiv Moscow
- 2009–2012: Dynamo Moscow
- 2012–2013: Lokomotiv Moscow
- 2014: Anzhi Makhachkala
- 2014–2016: Rostov

Senior career*
Years	Team	Apps	(Gls)
2014	Anzhi Makhachkala	0	(0)
2014–2019	Rostov	4	(0)
2016–2017	→ Fakel Voronezh (loan)	30	(2)
2017–2018	→ Tosno (loan)	8	(0)
2018–2019	→ Avangard Kursk (loan)	27	(3)
2019–2022	Khimki	65	(8)
2022–2023	Akhmat Grozny	29	(5)
2023–2026	Pari Nizhny Novgorod	51	(3)
2025–2026	→ Arsenal Tula (loan)	11	(1)
2026–	Rotor Volgograd	13	(2)

International career^{‡}
2016–2017	Russia U-21	2	(0)
- * Club domestic league appearances and goals as of 16 May 2026 ‡ National team caps and goals as of 28 March 2017

Aleksandr Igorevich Troshechkin (Russian: Александр Игоревич Трошечкин; born 23 April 1996) is a Russian professional football player who plays as a defensive midfielder for Rotor Volgograd.

== Club career ==
He made his debut in the Russian Premier League on 17 August 2014 for Rostov in a game against Krasnodar.

After returning to Rostov from loan in January 2019 and playing several pre-season games for the club, on 6 February 2019 he returned to Avangard Kursk on another loan until the end of the 2018–19 season.

On 10 July 2019, he signed with Khimki.

On 17 February 2022, Troshechkin joined Akhmat Grozny on a contract until the end of the 2023–24 season.

On 28 June 2023, Troshechkin signed a three-year contract with Pari Nizhny Novgorod. On 11 September 2025, he was loaned by Arsenal Tula.

On 16 January 2026, Troshechkin moved to Rotor Volgograd on a contract until 30 June 2027.

== Honours ==
Tosno

- Russian Cup: 2017–18

== Career statistics ==
As of match played 31 May 2025

Appearances and goals by club, season and competition
Club	Season	League			Cup		Continental		Other		Total	
Club	Season	Division	Apps	Goals	Apps	Goals	Apps	Goals	Apps	Goals	Apps	Goals
Anzhi Makhachkala	2013–14	Russian Premier League	0	0	0	0	0	0	–		0	0
Rostov	2014–15	Russian Premier League	3	0	1	0	0	0	–		4	0
Rostov	2015–16	Russian Premier League	1	0	1	0	–		–		2	0
Rostov	Total		4	0	2	0	0	0	0	0	6	0
Fakel Voronezh	2016–17	Russian First League	30	2	2	1	–		5 (Note: Appearances in the FNL Cup)	1	37	4
Tosno	2017–18	Russian Premier League	8	0	1	0	–		–		9	0
Avangard Kursk	2018–19	Russian First League	27	3	1	0	–		5	0	33	3
Khimki	2019–20	Russian First League	26	5	6	2	–		5	2	37	9
Khimki	2020–21	Russian Premier League	24	2	1	0	–		–		25	2
Khimki	2021–22	Russian Premier League	15	1	2	0	–		–		17	1
Khimki	Total		65	8	9	2	0	0	5	2	79	12
Akhmat Grozny	2021–22	Russian Premier League	10	3	–		–		–		10	3
Akhmat Grozny	2022–23	Russian Premier League	19	2	6	0	–		–		25	2
Akhmat Grozny	Total		29	5	6	0	0	0	0	0	35	5
Pari NN	2023–24	Russian Premier League	28	2	4	0	—		2 (Note: Appearances in the Relegation Play-offs)	0	34	2
Pari NN	2024–25	Russian Premier League	23	1	3	0	—		2	1	28	2
Pari NN	Total		51	3	7	0	—		4	1	62	4
Career total			214	21	28	3	0	0	19	4	261	28
