= Danil Massurenko =

Russian footballer

Personal information
- Full name: Danil Yuryevich Massurenko
- Date of birth: 22 May 1999 (age 27)
- Place of birth: Tselina, Russia
- Height: 1.76 m (5 ft 9 in)
- Position: Forward

Team information
- Current team: FC Nart Cherkessk
- Number: 88

Youth career
- 2015: FC Tselina
- 2016–2017: UOR #5 Yegoryevsk

Senior career*
Years	Team	Apps	(Gls)
2018–2020	FC Khimki	4	(0)
2018–2023	FC Khimki-M	86	(16)
2023	FC Khimki	1	(0)
2023–2024	FC Kaluga	14	(1)
2024	FC Legion Makhachkala	26	(5)
2025	SC Astrakhan	9	(0)
2026–	FC Nart Cherkessk	11	(0)
- * Club domestic league appearances and goals as of 31 October 2026

Danil Yuryevich Massurenko (Russian: Данил Юрьевич Массуренко; born 22 May 1999) is a Russian football player who plays for FC Nart Cherkessk.

== Club career ==
He made his debut in the Russian Football National League for FC Khimki on 10 March 2018 in a game against FC Shinnik Yaroslavl. He made his Russian Premier League debut for Khimki on 3 June 2023 against FC Pari Nizhny Novgorod.
