= Nikita Balakhontsev =

Russian footballer

Personal information
- Full name: Nikita Grigoryevich Balakhontsev
- Date of birth: 1 October 2002 (age 24)
- Place of birth: Khabarovsk, Russia
- Height: 1.74 m (5 ft 9 in)
- Position: Midfielder

Youth career
- –2018: FC SKA-Khabarovsk

Senior career*
Years	Team	Apps	(Gls)
2018–2019	FC SKA-Khabarovsk	0	(0)
2020	FC Nosta Novotroitsk	0	(0)
2020–2021	FC Novosibirsk	13	(4)
2021–2022	FC Khimki	0	(0)
2021	→ FC Novosibirsk (loan)	13	(4)
2021–2022	→ FC Olimp-Dolgoprudny (loan)	15	(0)
2022–2024	FC Tyumen	43	(1)
- * Club domestic league appearances and goals as of 25 May 2024

Nikita Grigoryevich Balakhontsev (Russian: Никита Григорьевич Балахонцев; born 1 October 2002) is a Russian football player.

== Club career ==
He made his debut in the Russian Football National League for FC Olimp-Dolgoprudny on 23 July 2021 in a game against FC KAMAZ Naberezhnye Chelny.
