= Dmitry Tikhy =

Russian footballer

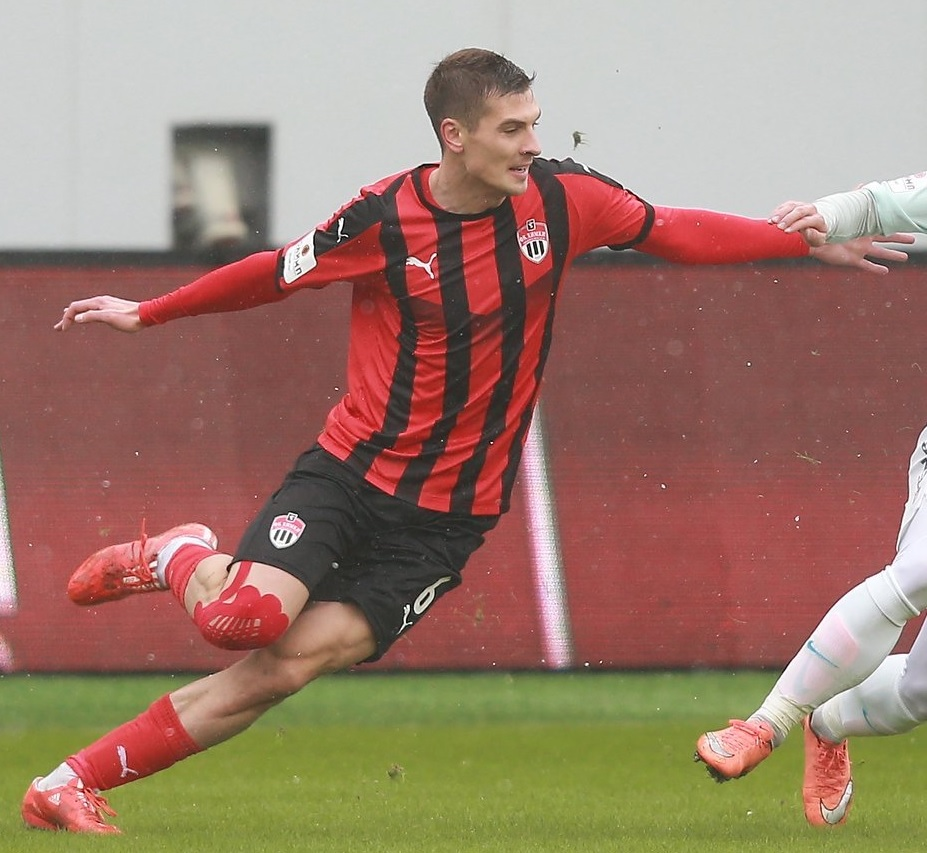
- Tikhy with Khimki in 2019

Personal information
- Full name: Dmitry Mikhaylovich Tikhy
- Date of birth: 29 October 1992 (age 34)
- Place of birth: Vladivostok, Russia
- Height: 1.86 m (6 ft 1 in)
- Position: Centre back

Team information
- Current team: FC Ural Yekaterinburg
- Number: 15

Youth career
- FC Luch-Energiya Vladivostok

Senior career*
Years	Team	Apps	(Gls)
2011–2012	FC Luch-Energiya Vladivostok	26	(2)
2013	FC Alania Vladikavkaz	0	(0)
2014–2017	FC Fakel Voronezh	56	(4)
2017–2018	FC Luch-Energiya Vladivostok	33	(2)
2018	FC Tom Tomsk	20	(0)
2019	FC Yenisey Krasnoyarsk	0	(0)
2019–2023	FC Khimki	97	(0)
2023–2024	FC Pari Nizhny Novgorod	22	(0)
2025	FC Urartu	9	(0)
2025–2026	Serikspor	7	(0)
2026	FC Volga Ulyanovsk	10	(1)
2026–	FC Ural Yekaterinburg	0	(0)
- * Club domestic league appearances and goals as of 16 May 2026

Dmitry Mikhaylovich Tikhy (Russian: Дми́трий Миха́йлович Ти́хий; born 29 October 1992) is a Russian football centre back who plays for FC Ural Yekaterinburg.

== Club career ==
He made his debut in the Russian Football National League for FC Luch-Energiya Vladivostok on 19 August 2011 in a game against FC Chernomorets Novorossiysk.

On 19 January 2019, he signed a 1.5-year contract with FC Yenisey Krasnoyarsk of the Russian Premier League.

On 19 February 2019, before the league resumed after the winter break and Tikhy had a chance to play a single official game for Yenisey, he moved again, to FC Khimki.

He made his Russian Premier League debut for FC Khimki on 8 August 2020 in a game against PFC CSKA Moscow.

On 3 July 2023, Tikhy signed with FC Pari Nizhny Novgorod. Tikhy left Pari Nizhny Novgorod by mutual consent on 15 November 2024.

In February 2025, Tikhy signed a contract with FC Urartu. On 1 July 2025, he left the club.

== Career statistics ==
As of match played 9 August 2024

Appearances and goals by club, season and competition
Club	Season	League			Cup		Europe		Other		Total	
Club	Season	Division	Apps	Goals	Apps	Goals	Apps	Goals	Apps	Goals	Apps	Goals
Luch-Energiya	2011–12	Russian First League	7	0	0	0	–		–		7	0
Luch-Energiya	2012–13	Russian Second League	19	2	0	0	–		–		19	2
Alania Vladikavkaz	2013–14	Russian First League	0	0	0	0	–		–		0	0
Fakel Voronezh	2014–15	Russian Second League	9	2	0	0	–		–		9	2
Fakel Voronezh	2015–16	Russian First League	24	1	0	0	–		4 (Note: Appearances in the FNL Cup)	0	28	1
Fakel Voronezh	2016–17	Russian First League	23	1	0	0	–		5	0	28	1
Fakel Voronezh	Total		56	4	0	0	0	0	9	0	65	4
Luch-Energiya	2017–18	Russian First League	33	2	3	0	–		5	0	41	2
Luch-Energiya	Total (2 spells)		59	4	3	0	0	0	5	0	67	4
Tom Tomsk	2018–19	Russian First League	20	0	0	0	–		–		20	0
Khimki	2018–19	Russian First League	14	0	–		–		–		14	0
Khimki	2019–20	Russian First League	26	0	4	1	–		5	0	35	1
Khimki	2020–21	Russian Premier League	28	0	2	0	–		–		30	0
Khimki	2021–22	Russian Premier League	20	0	0	0	–		2 (Note: Appearances in relegation play-offs)	0	22	0
Khimki	2022–23	Russian Premier League	9	0	1	0	–		–		10	0
Khimki	Total		97	0	7	1	0	0	7	0	111	1
Nizhny Novgorod	2023–24	Russian Premier League	18	0	2	0	—		2	0	22	0
Nizhny Novgorod	2024–25	Russian Premier League	4	0	0	0	—		—		4	0
Nizhny Novgorod	Total		22	0	2	0	—		—		26	0
Career total			254	8	12	1	0	0	23	0	289	9
