= Andrei Murnin =

Russian footballer

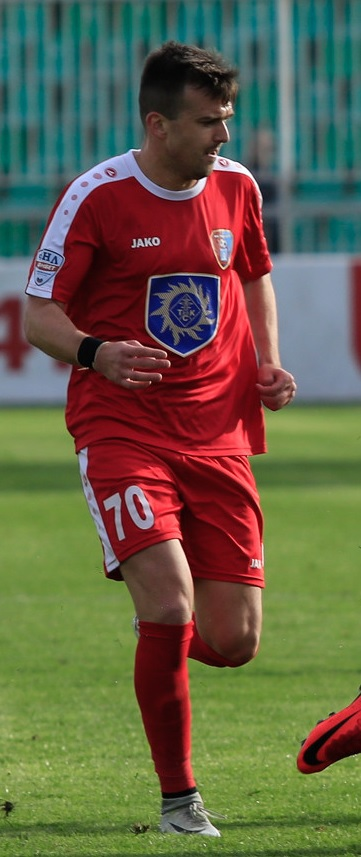
- Murnin with Tambov in 2018

Personal information
- Full name: Andrei Aleksandrovich Murnin
- Date of birth: 11 May 1985 (age 41)
- Place of birth: Saratov, Russian SFSR
- Height: 1.78 m (5 ft 10 in)
- Position: Midfielder

Youth career
- FC Salyut Saratov

Senior career*
Years	Team	Apps	(Gls)
2001–2004	FC Salyut Saratov	93	(26)
2005	FC Sokol Saratov	35	(3)
2006–2007	FC Salyut-Energiya Belgorod	60	(4)
2007–2013	FC SKA-Energiya Khabarovsk	195	(36)
2014	FC Tosno	26	(4)
2015–2016	FC Fakel Voronezh	68	(6)
2017–2019	FC Tambov	67	(9)
2019–2021	FC Khimki	12	(1)
2020–2021	→ FC Khimki-M	14	(1)
2021	FC Khimik Dzerzhinsk	1	(0)
- * Club domestic league appearances and goals

Andrei Aleksandrovich Murnin (Russian: Андрей Александрович Мурнин; born 11 May 1985) is a Russian former professional football player.

== Club career ==
He made his Russian Football National League debut for FC Sokol Saratov on 27 March 2005 in a game against FC SKA-Energiya Khabarovsk.

He made his Russian Premier League debut for FC Khimki on 14 August 2020 in a game against PFC Sochi, at the age of 35.
