= FC Nart Cherkessk =

- Full name: Football Club Nart Cherkessk
- Founded: 1982; 44 years ago
- Ground: Nart Stadium
- Capacity: 9,000
- Chairman: Alibek Korkmazov
- Manager: Timur Bitokov
- League: Russian Second League, Division B, Group 1
- 2026: 8th
- Website: fcnart.ru

FC Nart Cherkessk (Russian: ФК «Нарт» Черкесск) is a Russian football team from Cherkessk. It was founded in 1982 and played professionally from 1982 to 1998, from 2002 to 2003 and from 2024. It played on the second-highest level, Russian First Division, in 1992 and 1993.

On 16 February 2024, Nart was licensed for the 2024 season of the Russian Second League.

== Current squad ==
As of 11 September 2026, according to the Second League website.

Note: Flags indicate national team as defined under FIFA eligibility rules; some limited exceptions apply. Players may hold more than one non-FIFA nationality.

No.	Pos.	Nation	Player
1	GK	RUS	Nikita Kolesov
3	DF	RUS	Sarmat Khoziyev
7	FW	RUS	Ratmir Mashezov
8	MF	RUS	Islam Dokhov
9	FW	RUS	Ilya Vostrikov
11	DF	RUS	Yegor Belyayev
15	MF	RUS	Georgy Karginov
17	MF	RUS	Dmitri Kotov
27	DF	RUS	Konstantin Yerokhin
30	MF	RUS	Eldar Tkhakokov
32	DF	RUS	Ruslan Khasanov
37	MF	RUS	Temirlan Kadagazov
39	MF	RUS	Dzhabrail Taramov

No.	Pos.	Nation	Player
65	DF	RUS	Aleksandr Yartsev
70	DF	RUS	Ansar Abitov
71	DF	RUS	Alan Lelyukayev
77	MF	RUS	Nikita Kaverin
79	DF	RUS	Bogdan Matsola
88	MF	RUS	Danil Massurenko
90	DF	RUS	Zaur Baysurkayev (on loan from Akhmat Grozny)
91	GK	RUS	Aleksandr Dyachenko
92	DF	RUS	Abubakar Inalkayev
95	FW	RUS	Artemy Ositsin
97	DF	RUS	Matvey Filipovsky (on loan from Neftekhimik)
99	GK	RUS	Sergey Dusenko
