= Ilya Lantratov =

Russian footballer (born 1995)

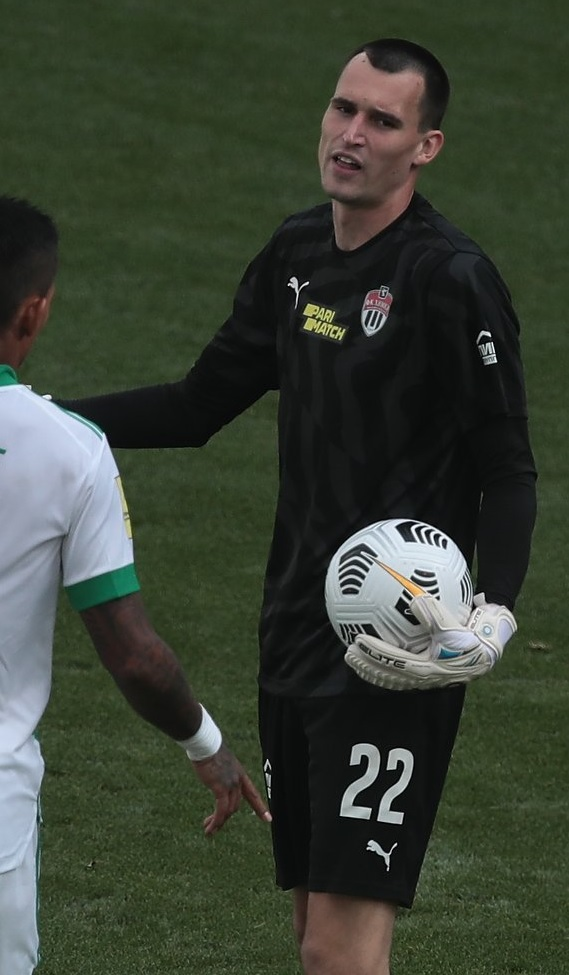
- Lantratov with FC Khimki in 2020

Personal information
- Full name: Ilya Valeryevich Lantratov
- Date of birth: 11 November 1995 (age 31)
- Place of birth: Prokhorovka, Russia
- Height: 1.94 m (6 ft 4 in)
- Position: Goalkeeper

Team information
- Current team: Lokomotiv Moscow
- Number: 22

Youth career
- Salyut Belgorod
- 2014–2016: Lokomotiv Moscow

Senior career*
Years	Team	Apps	(Gls)
2012–2014	Salyut Belgorod	0	(0)
2014	Lokomotiv-2 Moscow	8	(0)
2014–2016	Lokomotiv Moscow	0	(0)
2016–2017	Shinnik Yaroslavl	0	(0)
2017–2018	Baltika Kaliningrad	11	(0)
2019	Fakel Voronezh	10	(0)
2019–2022	Khimki	89	(0)
2022–	Lokomotiv Moscow	69	(0)

International career^{‡}
2015	Russia U21	6	(0)
2024–	Russia	1	(0)
- * Club domestic league appearances and goals as of 14 August 2026 ‡ National team caps and goals as of 15 November 2024

Ilya Valeryevich Lantratov (Russian: Илья Валерьевич Лантратов; born 11 November 1995) is a Russian football player who plays for Lokomotiv Moscow and the Russia national team.

== Club career ==
He made his professional debut in the Russian Professional Football League for FC Lokomotiv-2 Moscow on 22 April 2014 in a game against FC Dolgoprudny.

He made his Russian Football National League debut for FC Baltika Kaliningrad on 25 November 2017 in a game against FC Yenisey Krasnoyarsk. He was on trial in Russian Premier League club PFC Sochi in 2020.

He made his Russian Premier League debut for FC Khimki on 8 August 2020 in a game against PFC CSKA Moscow.

On 30 December 2022, Lantratov returned to Lokomotiv Moscow on a 3.5-year contract.

== International career ==
He was called up to the Russia national football team for the first time in October 2021 for the World Cup qualifiers against Cyprus and Croatia. He was included in the extended 41-players list of candidates. He made his debut on 12 September 2023 in a friendly against Qatar.

== Career statistics ==
=== Club ===
As of match played 29 October 2026

Appearances and goals by club, season and competition
Club	Season	League			Cup		Europe		Other		Total	
Club	Season	Division	Apps	Goals	Apps	Goals	Apps	Goals	Apps	Goals	Apps	Goals
Salyut Belgorod	2011–12	Russian Second League	0	0	0	0	–		–		0	0
Salyut Belgorod	2012–13	Russian First League	0	0	0	0	–		–		0	0
Salyut Belgorod	2013–14	Russian First League	0	0	0	0	–		–		0	0
Salyut Belgorod	Total		0	0	0	0	0	0	0	0	0	0
Lokomotiv-2 Moscow	2013–14	Russian Second League	8	0	–		–		–		8	0
Lokomotiv Moscow	2014–15	Russian Premier League	0	0	0	0	0	0	–		0	0
Lokomotiv Moscow	2015–16	Russian Premier League	0	0	0	0	0	0	–		0	0
Lokomotiv Moscow	Total		0	0	0	0	0	0	0	0	0	0
Shinnik Yaroslavl	2016–17	Russian First League	0	0	0	0	–		2 (Note: Appearances in the FNL Cup)	0	2	0
Baltika Kaliningrad	2017–18	Russian First League	1	0	0	0	–		–		1	0
Baltika Kaliningrad	2018–19	Russian First League	10	0	1	0	–		–		11	0
Baltika Kaliningrad	Total		11	0	1	0	0	0	0	0	12	0
Fakel Voronezh	2018–19	Russian First League	10	0	–		–		3	0	13	0
Khimki	2019–20	Russian First League	15	0	2	0	–		–		17	0
Khimki	2020–21	Russian Premier League	30	0	1	0	–		–		31	0
Khimki	2021–22	Russian Premier League	30	0	1	0	–		2 (Note: Appearances in the relegation play-offs)	0	33	0
Khimki	2022–23	Russian Premier League	14	0	0	0	–		–		14	0
Khimki	Total		89	0	4	0	0	0	2	0	95	0
Lokomotiv Moscow	2022–23	Russian Premier League	13	0	2	0	–		–		15	0
Lokomotiv Moscow	2023–24	Russian Premier League	30	0	4	0	–		–		34	0
Lokomotiv Moscow	2024–25	Russian Premier League	22	0	1	0	–		–		23	0
Lokomotiv Moscow	2025–26	Russian Premier League	1	0	6	0	–		–		7	0
Lokomotiv Moscow	2026–27	Russian Premier League	3	0	4	0	–		–		7	0
Lokomotiv Moscow	Total		69	0	17	0	–		–		86	0
Career total			190	0	22	0	0	0	7	0	219	0

=== International ===
As of match played 15 November 2024

Appearances and goals by national team and year
National team	Year	Apps	Goals
Russia
Russia	2024	1	0
Total		1	0
