= 2020–21 Russian Premier League =

29th season of top-tier football league in Russia

Russian Premier League
- Season: 2020–21
- Dates: 8 August 2020 – 16 May 2021
- Champions: Zenit Saint Petersburg
- Relegated: Rotor Volgograd; Tambov (dissolved)
- Champions League: Zenit Saint Petersburg; Spartak Moscow
- Europa League: Lokomotiv Moscow
- Europa Conference League: Rubin Kazan; Sochi
- Matches: 240
- Goals: 637 (2.65 per match)
- Top goalscorer: Artem Dzyuba (20 goals)
- Biggest home win: Zenit Saint Petersburg 6–0 Ufa (26 September 2020); Zenit Saint Petersburg 6–0 Rotor Volgograd (24 April 2021)
- Biggest away win: Krasnodar 0–5 Akhmat Grozny (3 April 2021)
- Highest scoring: Krasnodar 7–2 Khimki (18 September 2020)
- Longest winning run: 8 matches Lokomotiv Moscow
- Longest unbeaten run: 10 matches Khimki
- Longest winless run: 19 matches Tambov
- Longest losing run: 11 matches Tambov
- Highest attendance: 39,793; Zenit Saint Petersburg 6–1 Lokomotiv Moscow (2 May 2021)
- Lowest attendance: 539; Khimki 2–1 Ufa (27 February 2021); Excluding the games played without fans due to the COVID-19 pandemic, including the games played with restricted attendance for the same reason
- Total attendance: 1,878,441
- Average attendance: 8,239

The 2020–21 Russian Premier League（known as the Tinkoff Russian Premier League, also written as Tinkoff Russian Premier Liga for sponsorship reasons）was the 29th season of the premier football competition in Russia since the dissolution of the Soviet Union and the 19th under the current Russian Premier League name.

== Teams ==
As in the previous season, 16 teams are playing in the 2020–21 season. After the 2019–20 season, Orenburg and Krylia Sovetov were relegated to the 2020–21 Russian Football National League. Both return to the second tier after a two-year stay in the top tier. They were replaced by Rotor and Khimki, the winners and runners up of the 2019–20 Russian Football National League. Rotor Volgograd returned to the Premier League after a 16-year absence, while Khimki returned after an 11-year absence.

=== Venues ===
Zenit Saint Petersburg	Rotor	Khimki	Rostov
Krestovsky Stadium	Volgograd Arena	Arena Khimki	Rostov Arena
Capacity: 67,800	Capacity: 45,568	Capacity: 18,636	Capacity: 45,000
Spartak Moscow	Locations of teams in 2020–21 Russian Premier League Locations of teams in 2020-21 Russian Premier League in Moscow		Ural Yekaterinburg
Otkritie Arena	Locations of teams in 2020–21 Russian Premier League Locations of teams in 2020-21 Russian Premier League in Moscow		Central Stadium
Capacity: 44,307	Locations of teams in 2020–21 Russian Premier League Locations of teams in 2020-21 Russian Premier League in Moscow		Capacity: 35,696
Krasnodar	Locations of teams in 2020–21 Russian Premier League Locations of teams in 2020-21 Russian Premier League in Moscow		Akhmat Grozny
Krasnodar Stadium	Locations of teams in 2020–21 Russian Premier League Locations of teams in 2020-21 Russian Premier League in Moscow		Akhmat-Arena
Capacity: 34,291	Locations of teams in 2020–21 Russian Premier League Locations of teams in 2020-21 Russian Premier League in Moscow		Capacity: 30,597
CSKA Moscow	Locations of teams in 2020–21 Russian Premier League Locations of teams in 2020-21 Russian Premier League in Moscow		Lokomotiv Moscow
VEB Arena	Locations of teams in 2020–21 Russian Premier League Locations of teams in 2020-21 Russian Premier League in Moscow		RZD Arena
Capacity: 30,457	Locations of teams in 2020–21 Russian Premier League Locations of teams in 2020-21 Russian Premier League in Moscow		Capacity: 27,320
Sochi	Locations of teams in 2020–21 Russian Premier League Locations of teams in 2020-21 Russian Premier League in Moscow		Tambov
Fisht Olympic Stadium	Locations of teams in 2020–21 Russian Premier League Locations of teams in 2020-21 Russian Premier League in Moscow		Mordovia Arena
Capacity: 47,659	Locations of teams in 2020–21 Russian Premier League Locations of teams in 2020-21 Russian Premier League in Moscow		Capacity: 44,442
Arsenal Tula	Dynamo Moscow	Ufa	Rubin Kazan
Arsenal Stadium	VTB Arena	Neftyanik Stadium	Ak Bars Arena
Capacity: 20,048	Capacity: 26,319	Capacity: 15,132	Capacity: 45,093

=== Personnel and kits ===
Team	Location	Head coach	Captain	Kit manufacturer	Shirt sponsor
Akhmat	Grozny	(Russia) Andrei Talalayev	(Kosovo) Bernard Berisha	(Germany) Adidas	Akhmat Foundation
Arsenal	Tula	(Ukraine) Dmytro Parfenov	(Russia) Yevgeni Lutsenko	(Germany) Adidas	SPLAV
CSKA	Moscow	(Croatia) Ivica Olić	(Russia) Igor Akinfeev	(Spain) Joma	X-Holding
Dynamo	Moscow	(Germany) Sandro Schwarz	(Russia) Anton Shunin	(Spain) Kelme	VTB
Khimki	Khimki	(Tajikistan) Igor Cherevchenko	(Russia) Dmitri Tikhiy	(Germany) Puma	Parimatch
Krasnodar	Krasnodar	(Belarus) Viktor Goncharenko	(Russia) Matvei Safonov	(Germany) Puma	1XBET
Lokomotiv	Moscow	(Serbia) Marko Nikolić	(Croatia) Vedran Ćorluka	(Germany) Adidas	RZhD
Rostov	Rostov-on-Don	(Russia) Valeri Karpin	(Russia) Maksim Osipenko	(Germany) Puma	TNS Energo
Rotor	Volgograd	(Tajikistan) Yuri Baturenko	(Russia) Sergei Makarov	(United States) Nike	Marathonbet
Rubin	Kazan	(Russia) Leonid Slutsky	(Croatia) Filip Uremović	(Germany) Jako	TAIF
Sochi	Sochi	(Russia) Vladimir Fedotov	(Russia) Soslan Dzhanayev	(United States) Nike	
Spartak	Moscow	(Italy) Domenico Tedesco	(Russia) Georgi Dzhikiya	(United States) Nike	Lukoil
Tambov	Tambov	(Russia) Sergei Pervushin	(Russia) Aleksandr Denisov	(United States) Nike	Parimatch
Ufa	Ufa	(Russia) Aleksei Stukalov	(Slovenia) Bojan Jokić	(Spain) Joma	BetBoom
Ural	Yekaterinburg	(Russia) Yuri Matveyev	(Ukraine) Denys Kulakov	(United States) Nike	TMK
Zenit	Saint Petersburg	(Russia) Sergei Semak	(Croatia) Dejan Lovren	(United States) Nike	Gazprom

=== Managerial changes ===
Team	Outgoing manager	Manner of departure	Date of vacancy	Position in table	Replaced by	Date of appointment	Position in table
Akhmat Grozny	(Russia) Igor Shalimov	Contract expired	26 July 2020	Off-season	(Russia) Andrei Talalayev	26 July 2020	Off-season
Khimki	(Russia) Sergei Yuran	Fired	1 August 2020	Off-season	(Russia) Dmitri Gunko	1 August 2020	Off-season
Khimki	(Russia) Dmitri Gunko	Mutual consent	21 September 2020	15th	(Tajikistan) Igor Cherevchenko	25 September 2020	15th
Dynamo	(Russia) Kirill Novikov	Resigned	29 September 2020	9th	(Belarus) Alyaksandr Kulchy (caretaker)	29 September 2020	9th
Ufa	(Russia) Vadim Evseev	Mutual consent	7 October 2020	15th	(Tajikistan) Rashid Rakhimov	11 October 2020	15th
Dynamo	(Belarus) Alyaksandr Kulchy (caretaker)	End of role	14 October 2020	6th	(Germany) Sandro Schwarz	14 October 2020	6th
Arsenal	(Russia) Sergei Podpaly	Fired	2 November 2020	13th	(Ukraine) Dmytro Parfenov	2 November 2020	13th
Rotor	(Belarus) Alyaksandr Khatskevich	Fired	19 March 2021	13th	(Tajikistan) Yuri Baturenko	20 March 2021	13th
CSKA	(Belarus) Viktor Goncharenko	Mutual consent	22 March 2021	5th	(Croatia) Ivica Olić	23 March 2021	5th
Ufa	(Tajikistan) Rashid Rakhimov	Resigned	3 April 2021	15th	(Russia) Nikolai Safronidi (caretaker)	3 April 2021	15th
Krasnodar	(Russia) Murad Musayev	Resigned	3 April 2021	10th	(Belarus) Viktor Goncharenko	6 April 2021	10th
Ufa	(Russia) Nikolai Safronidi (caretaker)	End of role	9 April 2021	15th	(Russia) Aleksei Stukalov	9 April 2021	15th

== Tournament format and regulations ==
=== Basic ===
The 16 teams were playing a round-robin tournament whereby each team plays each one of the other teams twice, once at home and once away. Thus, a total of 240 matches was played, with 30 matches played by each team.

=== Promotion and relegation ===
The teams that finish 15th and 16th will be relegated to the FNL 2021–22, while the top 2 in that league will be promoted to the 2021–22 season.

The 13th and 14th Premier League teams will play the 4th and 3rd FNL 2020–21 teams respectively in two (home-and-away) playoff games with the winners securing Premier League spots for the 2021–22 season. In case one of the Premier League teams that finish 13th and 14th will not pass licensing for the 2021–22 Premier League season, the other Premier League club will remain in the league, and the 3rd and 4th FNL teams will play each other in a two-game playoff for the remaining spot. In case one of the FNL teams that finish 3rd and 4th will not pass licensing for the 2021–22 Premier League season, the team that finished Premier League in 13th place will remain in the league, and the team that finished 14th will play the FNL team that passed licensing in a two-game playoff, with the winner securing the Premier League spot. In case only two of the clubs otherwise eligible for the playoffs pass licensing for the 2020–21 season, the playoffs will not be held and the clubs that passed licensing will get the Premier League spots. In case any teams otherwise eligible for the 2021–22 Premier League (including the top 2 2020–21 FNL clubs) will not pass licensing or will be unable to participate in the season for any other reason, the spots will be passed on to the teams that lost in the playoffs, in order of their 2020–21 league position, with the Premier League positions considered higher than FNL positions (for example, if 13th Premier League team and 3rd FNL team lose in the playoffs, the spot will go to the 13th Premier League team). If, after following these procedures, there are still 2021–22 Premier League spots available (in case 3 or more teams otherwise qualified are unable to participate), the remaining replacements will be chosen by the Russian Football Union with agreement of the Premier League and FNL.

2nd and 4th FNL teams (FC Orenburg and FC Alania Vladikavkaz) failed licensing for the 2021–22 Premier League season (due to lack of acceptable stadium), their appeal was denied on 12 May 2021. On 15 May 2021, Russian Football Union confirmed that the relegation playoffs will not be held. RFU also amended the playoff regulations accordingly. If the original version of the regulations was followed to the letter, FC Nizhny Novgorod would have faced FC Arsenal Tula in a home-and-away playoff series, and then the loser of the series would be promoted into the Premier League anyway, rendering the playoffs meaningless.

== Season events ==
On 13 September 2020, the league cancelled the game between FC Rotor Volgograd and FC Krasnodar due to more than 7 positive COVID-19 tests among the Rotor players and staff. On 16 September 2020, Russian Football Union assigned a 3–0 victory to Krasnodar. On 18 September 2020, the league cancelled the game between FC Rostov and Rotor originally scheduled for 19 September due to continuing positive virus tests at Rotor. On 22 September 2020, Russian Football Union assigned a 3–0 victory to Rostov.

== League table ==
Pos	Team	Pld	W	D	L	GF	GA	GD	Pts	Qualification or relegation
1	Zenit Saint Petersburg (C)	30	19	8	3	76	26	+50	65	Qualification for the Champions League group stage
2	Spartak Moscow	30	17	6	7	56	37	+19	57	Qualification for the Champions League third qualifying round
3	Lokomotiv Moscow	30	17	5	8	45	35	+10	56	Qualification for the Europa League group stage (Note: FC Lokomotiv Moscow qualified for the Europa League group stage by winning the 2020–21 Russian Cup. The Europa Conference League spot awarded to the third-placed team is passed to fourth-placed team, and the spot awarded to the fourth-placed team is passed to fifth-placed team.)
4	Rubin Kazan	30	16	5	9	42	33	+9	53 (Note: Head-to-head points: Rubin 3, Sochi 3. Overall matches won: Rubin 16, Sochi 15.)	Qualification for the Europa Conference League third qualifying round
5	Sochi	30	15	8	7	49	33	+16	53	Qualification for the Europa Conference League second qualifying round
6	CSKA Moscow	30	15	5	10	51	33	+18	50 (Note: Head-to-head points: CSKA 3, Dynamo 3. Head-to-head goal difference: CSKA +1, Dynamo -1.)	
7	Dynamo Moscow	30	15	5	10	44	33	+11	50	
8	Khimki	30	13	6	11	35	39	−4	45	
9	Rostov	30	13	4	13	37	35	+2	43	
10	Krasnodar	30	12	5	13	52	45	+7	41	
11	Akhmat Grozny	30	11	7	12	36	38	−2	40	
12	Ural Yekaterinburg	30	7	13	10	26	36	−10	34	
13	Ufa	30	6	7	17	26	46	−20	25	
14	Arsenal Tula	30	6	5	19	28	51	−23	23	
15	Rotor Volgograd (R)	30	5	7	18	15	52	−37	22	Relegation to Football National League
16	Tambov (D)	30	3	4	23	19	65	−46	13	Dissolved after the season (Note: On 19 May 2021, FC Tambov announced that most of the staff and players were released from their contracts and the club began the process of liquidation.)

Source: Premier Liga
Rules for classification: 1) Points; 2) Head-to-head points; 3) Head-to-head matches won; 4) Head-to-head goal difference; 5) Head-to-head goals scored; 6) Matches won; 7) Goal difference; 8) Goals scored; 9) Play-off.
(C) Champions; (D) Disqualified; (R) Relegated

== Results ==
Home \ Away	AKH	ARS	CSK	DYN	KHI	KRA	LOK	ROS	ROT	RUB	SOC	SPA	TAM	UFA	URA	ZEN
Akhmat Grozny	—	2–0	0–3	1–2	3–1	2–0	0–0	0–1	3–1	0–0	0–1	2–2	3–1	3–1	2–0	2–2
Arsenal Tula	0–0	—	2–1	2–0	1–1	1–0	0–3	2–3	1–1	2–4	3–2	1–2	4–0	2–3	1–0	0–0
CSKA Moscow	2–0	5–1	—	3–1	2–2	3–1	0–1	2–0	2–0	1–2	1–1	3–1	2–1	1–1	2–2	2–3
Dynamo Moscow	1–0	1–0	3–2	—	0–1	2–0	5–1	2–0	0–0	0–1	3–1	1–2	2–0	4–0	2–2	1–0
Khimki	1–2	1–0	0–2	1–0	—	1–0	3–2	1–0	1–1	2–0	0–0	2–3	1–0	2–1	1–0	0–2
Krasnodar	0–5	2–0	1–1	2–3	7–2	—	5–0	1–1	5–0	3–1	1–3	1–3	1–0	1–0	2–2	2–2
Lokomotiv Moscow	2–3	1–0	2–0	0–0	2–1	1–0	—	4–1	1–2	3–1	3–1	2–0	1–0	1–0	1–0	0–0
Rostov	3–0	1–0	1–3	4–1	0–2	1–3	0–0	—	3–0	0–1	0–0	2–3	2–0	0–1	1–0	0–2
Rotor Volgograd	1–0	1–0	0–1	0–3	0–0	0–3	0–2	0–4	—	1–3	1–2	0–1	0–2	1–0	0–0	0–2
Rubin Kazan	1–1	3–1	1–0	2–0	1–3	0–1	0–2	0–2	1–1	—	1–0	0–2	2–2	3–0	1–1	2–1
Sochi	2–0	4–0	2–1	2–0	1–1	1–1	2–1	4–2	2–1	3–2	—	1–0	5–0	1–1	0–0	1–2
Spartak Moscow	2–0	2–1	1–0	1–1	2–1	6–1	2–1	0–1	2–0	0–2	2–2	—	5–1	0–3	5–1	1–1
Tambov	0–1	1–1	1–2	1–2	1–0	0–4	2–5	0–1	1–3	0–1	0–1	0–2	—	2–0	1–1	1–5
Ufa	3–0	2–1	0–1	1–1	1–2	0–3	0–1	0–1	0–0	0–3	2–3	1–1	4–0	—	1–2	0–0
Ural Yekaterinburg	1–1	2–0	0–2	0–2	3–1	1–0	1–1	1–0	1–0	0–1	1–0	2–2	0–0	0–0	—	1–1
Zenit Saint Petersburg	4–0	3–1	2–1	3–1	2–0	3–1	6–1	2–2	6–0	1–2	3–1	3–1	4–1	6–0	5–1	—

Updated to match(es) played on 16 May 2021. Source: Russian Premier League
Legend: Blue = home team win; Yellow = draw; Red = away team win.
For upcoming matches, an "a" indicates there is an article about the rivalry between the two participants.

=== Positions by round ===
The table lists the positions of teams after each week of matches. In order to preserve chronological evolvements, any postponed matches are not included to the round at which they were originally scheduled, but added to the full round they were played immediately afterwards.

Team ╲ Round	1	2	3	4	5	6	7	8	9	10	11	12	13	14	15	16	17	18	19	20	21	22	23	24	25	26	27	28	29	30
Zenit Saint Petersburg	2	1	1	1	1	2	1	1	1	1	1	3	2	2	2	1	1	1	1	1	1	1	1	1	1	1	1	1	1	1
Spartak Moscow	7	4	6	2	2	1	3	2	2	2	2	1	3	3	3	3	2	2	3	4	3	2	2	2	2	3	3	2	2	2
Lokomotiv Moscow	3	3	3	4	7	8	10	8	6	5	4	4	7	8	8	7	6	7	8	7	6	4	3	3	3	2	2	3	3	3
Rubin Kazan	12	10	13	12	8	10	6	9	8	9	9	9	8	9	10	9	10	9	9	9	8	6	8	6	5	4	4	4	4	4
Sochi	8	9	7	3	3	3	2	4	5	4	6	7	6	5	6	8	7	6	4	3	4	5	4	7	7	7	5	5	5	5
CSKA Moscow	4	2	5	8	9	5	4	3	4	3	3	2	1	1	1	2	3	3	2	2	2	3	5	4	4	5	6	6	6	6
Dynamo Moscow	5	5	2	5	4	4	5	5	9	6	8	5	4	4	4	5	4	5	6	6	5	7	6	5	6	6	7	7	7	7
Khimki	15	14	15	15	15	15	15	15	14	14	14	14	14	14	12	12	12	11	11	10	10	10	9	9	8	8	8	8	8	8
Rostov	6	7	10	9	6	6	8	7	3	7	5	6	5	6	5	4	5	4	5	5	7	9	7	8	9	9	9	9	9	9
Krasnodar	1	6	4	7	10	9	7	6	7	8	7	8	10	10	9	10	9	8	7	8	9	8	10	10	10	11	10	10	11	10
Akhmat Grozny	10	13	8	6	5	7	9	10	10	10	10	10	9	7	7	6	8	10	10	11	11	11	11	11	11	10	11	11	10	11
Ural Yekaterinburg	13	11	12	10	12	11	11	11	11	11	13	13	11	11	11	11	11	12	12	12	12	12	12	12	12	12	12	12	12	12
Ufa	16	8	9	11	13	12	13	14	15	15	15	16	16	16	16	15	14	14	15	15	14	15	15	15	15	14	14	15	14	13
Arsenal Tula	9	12	14	13	11	13	14	12	12	12	11	12	13	12	13	13	13	13	14	14	15	14	14	14	13	13	13	13	13	14
Rotor Volgograd	14	15	16	16	16	16	16	16	16	16	16	15	15	15	15	16	16	16	13	13	13	13	13	13	14	15	15	14	15	15
Tambov	11	16	11	14	14	14	12	13	13	13	12	11	12	13	14	14	15	15	16	16	16	16	16	16	16	16	16	16	16	16

Updated to match(es) played on 16 May 2021. Source: https://eng.premierliga.ru/tournaments/championship/tournament-table/

== Season statistics ==
=== Top goalscorers ===
As of matches played on 16 May 2021.

Rank	Player	Club	Goals
1	(Russia) Artem Dzyuba	Zenit Saint Petersburg	20
2	(Iran) Sardar Azmoun	Zenit Saint Petersburg	19
3	(Sweden) Jordan Larsson	Spartak Moscow	15
4	(Serbia) Đorđe Despotović	Rubin Kazan	14
4	(Russia) Aleksandr Sobolev	Spartak Moscow	14
6	(Ecuador) Christian Noboa	Sochi	12
7	(Croatia) Nikola Vlašić	CSKA Moscow	11
8	(Sweden) Marcus Berg	Krasnodar	9
8	(Russia) Vladimir Ilyin	Akhmat Grozny	9
8	(Poland) Grzegorz Krychowiak	Lokomotiv Moscow	9
8	(Argentina) Ezequiel Ponce	Spartak Moscow	9
8	(Russia) Anton Zabolotny	Sochi	9

== Season awards ==
=== Russian Football Union awards ===
On 15 July 2021, Russian Football Union named its list of 33 top players:

Goalkeepers

1. (Russia) Yury Dyupin (Rubin)
2. (Russia) Ilya Lantratov (Khimki)
3. (Russia) Igor Akinfeev (CSKA)

Right backs

1. (Russia) Mário Fernandes (CSKA)
2. (Russia) Vyacheslav Karavayev (Zenit)
3. (Russia) Dmitri Rybchinsky (Lokomotiv)

Right-centre backs

1. (Croatia) Vedran Ćorluka (Lokomotiv)
2. (Croatia) Dejan Lovren (Zenit)
3. (France) Samuel Gigot (Spartak)

Left-centre backs

1. (Ukraine) Yaroslav Rakitskiy (Zenit)
2. (Russia) Georgi Dzhikiya (Spartak)
3. (Brazil) Pablo (Lokomotiv)

Left backs

1. (Brazil) Douglas Santos (Zenit)
2. (Russia) Ilya Samoshnikov (Rubin)
3. (Brazil) Ayrton (Spartak)

Right midfielders

1. (Brazil) Malcom (Zenit)
2. (Russia) Denis Makarov (Rubin)
3. (Brazil) Wanderson (Krasnodar)

Right central midfielders

1. (Ecuador) Christian Noboa (Sochi)
2. (Colombia) Wilmar Barrios (Zenit)
3. (Brazil) Wendel (Zenit)

Left central midfielders

1. (Poland) Grzegorz Krychowiak (Lokomotiv)
2. (Croatia) Nikola Vlašić (CSKA)
3. (Russia) Magomed Ozdoyev (Zenit)

Left midfielders

1. (Georgia (country)) Khvicha Kvaratskhelia (Rubin)
2. (Russia) Daniil Lesovoy (Dynamo)
3. (Nigeria) Chidera Ejuke (CSKA)

Right forwards

1. (Russia) Artem Dzyuba (Zenit)
2. (Serbia) Đorđe Despotović (Rubin)
3. (Russia) Aleksandr Sobolev (Spartak)

Left forwards

1. (Iran) Sardar Azmoun (Zenit)
2. (Sweden) Jordan Larsson (Spartak)
3. (Russia) Fyodor Smolov (Lokomotiv)

Other awards announced by RFU on the same day included:

- Best player: Sardar Azmoun (Zenit)
- Best coach: Sergei Semak (Zenit)
- Best team: FC Zenit Saint Petersburg
- Hope award (Best Under-21 player): Arsen Zakharyan (Dynamo)
- For contribution to football development: Yevgeni Giner (CSKA)

=== Russian Premier League awards ===
- Player of the season: Sardar Azmoun (Zenit)
- Coach of the season: Sergei Semak (Zenit)
- Goal of the season: Denis Makarov (Rubin 2–1 Zenit, 8 March 2021)
- Young player of the season: Khvicha Kvaratskhelia (Rubin)
- Goalkeeper of the season: Guilherme (Lokomotiv)
