= Maksim Martusevich =

Russian footballer

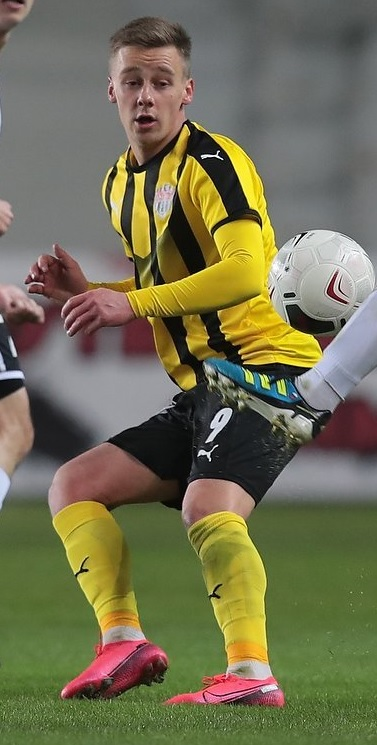
- Martusevich with FC Khimki in 2020

Personal information
- Full name: Maksim Vyacheslavovich Martusevich
- Date of birth: 7 March 1995 (age 31)
- Place of birth: Moscow, Russia
- Height: 1.75 m (5 ft 9 in)
- Position: Midfielder

Youth career
- CSKA Moscow

Senior career*
Years	Team	Apps	(Gls)
2012–2015	CSKA Moscow II	74	(4)
2015–2016	Javor Ivanjica	3	(0)
2016	FC Zenit Penza	12	(1)
2017–2019	União de Leiria	53	(2)
2019	Vizela	11	(0)
2019	Zorky Krasnogorsk	8	(0)
2020	Khimki	8	(0)
2020–2022	SKA-Khabarovsk	55	(4)
2022–2023	Rotor Volgograd	12	(0)
2023–2024	Amkar Perm	18	(0)

International career
2011	Russia U16		
2013	Russia U18		
2013	Russia U19	3	(1)
- * Club domestic league appearances and goals

Maksim Vyacheslavovich Martusevich (Russian: Максим Вячеславович Мартусевич; born 7 March 1995) is a Russian former football midfielder.

== Career ==
=== CSKA Moscow reserves ===
Born in Moscow, Martusevich passed the youth school of PFC CSKA. When he was 17, he started playing for reserves, which included players under 21 years. He was also with the first team until 2015, but did not make an official debut. He made 3 appearances in NextGen Series and 7 UEFA Youth League playing for U19 team from 2012 to 2014.

=== Javor Ivanjica ===
Martusevich moved to Serbian SuperLiga side and signed with Javor Ivanjica the last day of summer transfer period 2015. He made his debut for new club in 13 fixture of the 2015–16 Serbian SuperLiga season, versus Mladost Lučani. He also scored a goal in a cup match against Novi Pazar.

=== Leiria ===
On 8 February 2017, he joined a Portuguese club União de Leiria.

=== Vizela ===
On 8 January 2019, he moved to another Portuguese club Vizela.

=== Khimki ===
He made his Russian Premier League debut for FC Khimki on 8 August 2020 in a game against PFC CSKA Moscow.

=== Amkar Perm ===
On 16 February 2024, Amkar announced that Martusevich decided to pause his playing career.
