= Yevgeny Gapon =

Russian footballer

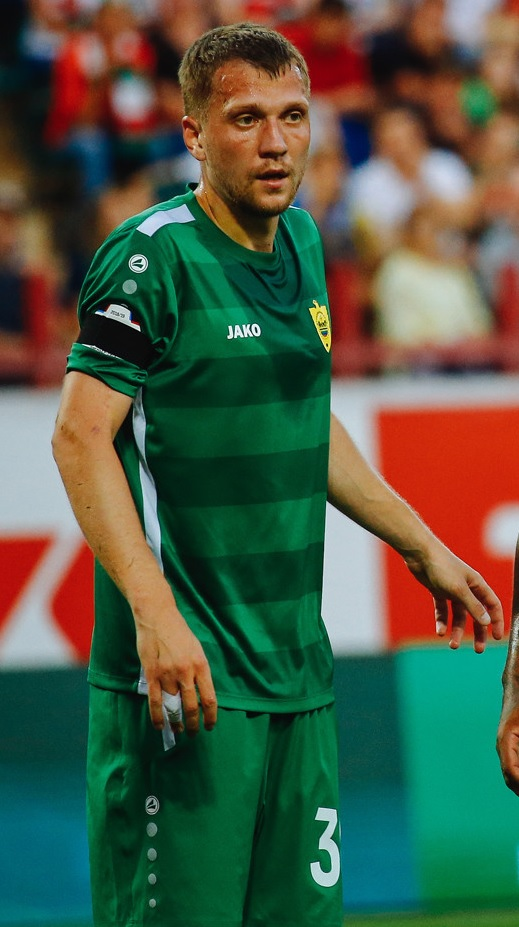
- Gapon with Anzhi in 2018

Personal information
- Full name: Yevgeny Eduardovich Gapon
- Date of birth: 20 April 1991 (age 35)
- Place of birth: Novosibirsk, Russian SFSR
- Height: 1.89 m (6 ft 2 in)
- Position: Left-back

Youth career
- –2008: FC Academica Moscow

Senior career*
| Years | Team | Apps | (Gls) |
| 2008 | FC Sportakademklub Moscow | 9 | (0) |
| 2009–2010 | FC Khimki | 37 | (0) |
| 2011 | FC Shinnik Yaroslavl | 13 | (0) |
| 2011–2012 | FC Anzhi Makhachkala | 0 | (0) |
| 2011–2012 | → FC Fakel Voronezh (loan) | 25 | (0) |
| 2012–2013 | FC Fakel Voronezh | 7 | (0) |
| 2013–2014 | FC Shinnik Yaroslavl | 44 | (1) |
| 2015–2016 | FC Mordovia Saransk | 20 | (0) |
| 2016–2018 | FC Kuban Krasnodar | 26 | (0) |
| 2017–2018 | FC Kuban-2 Krasnodar | 3 | (0) |
| 2018–2019 | FC Anzhi Makhachkala | 17 | (0) |
| 2019–2021 | FC Khimki | 30 | (0) |
| 2021 | FC Shakhter Karagandy | 9 | (0) |
| 2021 | FC Kuban Krasnodar | 9 | (0) |
| 2022 | FC Tekstilshchik Ivanovo | 5 | (0) |
| 2023 | SC Astrakhan | 2 | (0) |

International career
| 2009 | Russia U-19 | 3 | (0) |
| 2011–2012 | Russia U-21 | 4 | (0) |
- * Club domestic league appearances and goals

Yevgeny Eduardovich Gapon (Russian: Евге́ний Эдуа́рдович Гапо́н; born 20 April 1991) is a Russian former professional footballer.

== Career ==
He made his debut in the Russian Premier League on 3 April 2009 for FC Khimki in a game against FC Rostov.

In January 2015, Gapon went on trial with CSKA Moscow.

On 13 May 2021, he signed with Kazakhstan Premier League club FC Shakhter Karagandy.
