= 2019–20 Russian Football National League =

Russian Football National League
- Season: 2019–20
- Promoted: FC Rotor Volgograd; FC Khimki
- Relegated: None
- Goals: 474
- Top goalscorer: Aleksandr Rudenko (Spartak-2 Moscow / Torpedo Moscow); Ivan Sergeyev (Torpedo) (14 goals)
- Biggest home win: Spartak-2 7-2 Fakel
- Biggest away win: Tekstilshchik 1-5 Baltika, Fakel 0-4 Shinnik
- Highest scoring: Spartak-2 7-2 Fakel (9 goals)
- Longest winning run: Torpedo Moscow (9 games)
- Longest unbeaten run: Baltika (14 games)
- Longest winless run: Yenisey (13 games)
- Longest losing run: Mordovia (5 games)
- Highest attendance: Nizhny Novgorod 0–2 Tom (7 July 2019, 8,229 in attendance)
- Lowest attendance: Tekstilshchik 0–1 Yenisey (7 July 2019, 600 in attendance)
- Average attendance: 4,530
- All statistics correct as of 8 July 2019.

The 2019–20 Russian Football National League was the 28th season of Russia's second-tier football league since the dissolution of the Soviet Union. The season began on 7 July 2019 and ended on 15 May 2020 (last games were played on 15 March).

== Summary ==
On 17 March 2020, the league was suspended until 10 April 2020 due to the COVID-19 pandemic in Russia. On 1 April 2020, Russian Football Union extended the suspension until 31 May 2020.

On 15 April 2020, FC Armavir dropped out of the competition due to lack of financing necessary to acquire the license for the 2020–21 season. The club was in the 12th place in the table with 30 points acquired in 27 games. Even though the league was suspended at that time due to COVID-19 pandemic in Russia, FNL president Igor Yefremov stated that the drop-out was not directly related to that and the club was in financial trouble before the pandemic. According to the league regulations, all Armavir's opponents in the second half of the season were to automatically assigned a 3–0 victory in all of their second games against Armavir, including retroactively in the games that were already played. As a result, FC Fakel Voronezh, FC Torpedo Moscow and FC Spartak-2 Moscow (who lost to Armavir in their second games of the season) were expected to gain 3 extra points and FC Tom Tomsk (who tied with Armavir) were expected to gain 2 extra points.

On 30 April 2020, the clubs voted unanimously that the league can not be concluded by 2 August 2020 as planned. The teams that were in positions from 3 to 5 (FC Chertanovo Moscow, FC Torpedo Moscow and FC Neftekhimik Nizhnekamsk) suggested extending the season past that date (the 3rd and 4th placed teams were expected to play in Russian Premier League relegation/promotion playoffs), but were overruled by the other 17 clubs. The decision was complicated by FC Armavir announcing that the club is dropping out of the competition but not officially filing related paperwork with the league. If they formally dropped out, FC Torpedo Moscow would have gained 3 points in the game they already played and lost to Armavir, and would have advanced into the 2nd position in the table that secures direct promotion into the Premier League.

On 15 May 2020, the league was abandoned, and the top two teams (FC Rotor Volgograd and FC Khimki) were promoted, pending licensing for the Premier League for 2020–21 season. None of the teams were relegated to PFL and all the winners of the PFL zones were promoted to the FNL as well for the 2020–21 season, all conditional on passing FNL licensing.

== Team changes ==
=== To FNL ===
Promoted from PFL

- Chayka Peschanokopskoye
- Neftekhimik Nizhnekamsk
- Torpedo Moscow
- Tekstilshchik Ivanovo

Relegated from Premier League

- Yenisey Krasnoyarsk

=== From FNL ===
Relegated to PFL

- Sibir Novosibirsk
- Zenit-2 Saint Petersburg
- Tyumen

Promoted to Premier League

- Tambov
- Sochi

=== FC Anzhi Makhachkala ===
On May 29, 2019, Anzhi, which was relegated to FNL at the end of the 2018–19 Russian Premier League season, recalled their appeal to the Russian Football Union on earlier RFU's decision to deny them the FNL license. Therefore, Anzhi did not play in the FNL in the 2019–20 season. Anzhi then passed the licensing procedure of the RFU, which allows them to participate in the PFL.

== Stadia by capacity ==
Club	City	Stadium	Capacity
Armavir	Armavir	Yunost	5,700
Avangard	Kursk	Trudovye Rezervy	11,329
Baltika	Kaliningrad	Arena Baltika	35,212
Chayka	Peschanokopskoye	Chayka Central Stadium	3,000
Chertanovo	Moscow	Arena Chertanovo	500
Fakel	Voronezh	Tsentralnyi Profsoyuz	31,793
Khimki	Khimki	Rodina	5,083
Krasnodar-2	Krasnodar	Krasnodar Academy	3,500
Luch	Vladivostok	Dynamo	10,200
Mordovia	Saransk	Mordovia Arena	44,442
Nizhny Novgorod	Nizhny Novgorod	Nizhny Novgorod	44,899
Neftehimik	Nizhnekamsk	Neftekhimik	3,200
Rotor	Volgograd	Volgograd Arena	45,568
Shinnik	Yaroslavl	Shinnik Stadium	22,990
SKA	Khabarovsk	Lenin Stadium	15,200
Spartak-2	Moscow	Spartak Academy	4,000
Tekstilshchik	Ivanovo	Tekstilshchik	9,565
Tom	Tomsk	Trud	10,028
Torpedo Moscow	Moscow	Eduard Streltsov Stadium	13,420
Yenisey	Krasnoyarsk	Central Stadium	15,000

== Stadia by locations ==
Location of teams in 2019–20 FNL.
Location of Moscow teams.

== League table ==
Pos	Team	Pld	W	D	L	GF	GA	GD	Pts	Promotion, qualification or relegation
1	Rotor Volgograd (P)	27	17	5	5	41	21	+20	56	Promotion to Premier League
2	Khimki (P)	27	16	6	5	50	19	+31	54	Promotion to Premier League
3	Chertanovo Moscow	27	15	9	3	37	19	+18	54	
4	Torpedo Moscow	27	16	5	6	39	25	+14	53	
5	Neftekhimik Nizhnekamsk	27	13	9	5	38	25	+13	48	
6	SKA-Khabarovsk	27	12	7	8	42	30	+12	43	
7	Baltika Kaliningrad	27	12	7	8	34	23	+11	43	
8	Shinnik Yaroslavl	27	12	7	8	43	35	+8	43	
9	Tom Tomsk	27	10	9	8	32	26	+6	39	
10	Chayka Peschanokopskoye	27	10	8	9	31	29	+2	38	
11	Nizhny Novgorod	27	9	9	9	28	29	−1	36	
12	Armavir	27	7	9	11	23	29	−6	30	Relegation to lower divisions
13	Avangard Kursk	27	5	14	8	29	39	−10	29	Relegation to lower divisions
14	Yenisey Krasnoyarsk	27	7	7	13	23	40	−17	28	
15	Krasnodar-2	27	6	10	11	32	34	−2	28	Ineligible for promotion
16	Luch Vladivostok	27	6	9	12	28	40	−12	27	Relegation to lower divisions
17	Spartak-2 Moscow	27	6	8	13	38	45	−7	26	~~Relegation to Russian Professional Football League~~ (Note: Due to the COVID-19 pandemic in Russia, no teams were relegated.)
18	Tekstilshchik Ivanovo	27	5	4	18	25	52	−27	19	~~Relegation to Russian Professional Football League~~
19	Fakel Voronezh	27	4	7	16	14	44	−30	19	~~Relegation to Russian Professional Football League~~
20	Mordovia Saransk	27	4	7	16	21	44	−23	19	Relegation to lower divisions

Updated to match(es) played on 15 March. Source: Football National League (Russian), Soccerway
(P) Promoted

== Results ==
Home \ Away	ARM	AVA	BAL	CHA	CHE	FAK	KHI	KR2	LUC	MOR	NNO	NEF	ROT	SHI	SKA	SP2	TEK	TOM	TOR	YEN
Armavir			1–1	2–1	1–1	1–0		2–1	0–0	0–0		0–2	0–0	0–1		1–1	2–0	1–1	2–1	
Avangard Kursk	2–1		0–0	1–1	0–1		0–3	1–1		2–2		1–0	0–3	2–2		2–2	2–1	3–2	2–2	
Baltika Kaliningrad	2–0			0–1	1–2	3–0		4–1	0–0		2–1	1–0	2–1		1–0	0–1			1–1	
Chayka Peschanokopskoye	1–0	1–1	1–0		0–1	0–1		1–1	1–1	3–1	0–0	0–2	2–1		0–2	2–1	3–0			
Chertanovo Moscow			3–1			4–0	0–0	1–2		3–0		2–2	1–0	0–1	1–0	2–2	1–0	1–1		2–1
Fakel Voronezh	0–2	0–0	1–2	0–0	0–0		0–3		1–0	2–1	0–2			0–4	0–2			0–0	0–1	1–1
Khimki	1–0	3–0	0–1	1–0	3–1			3–0		4–0		3–2	0–2			1–0	2–1	3–0		4–0
Krasnodar-2		1–0			1–2	0–0	2–0		1–2		2–2		0–1	2–2	2–2		1–1	0–1		4–0
Luch Vladivostok		2–2		1–1	0–1	3–0	2–5	1–1			0–0	0–2		2–1	0–2	2–4		1–1	0–1	0–1
Mordovia Saransk			0–3	0–0	2–3	1–1		0–3	1–2		0–1	0–1	0–1	1–1	2–3	1–0	1–0		1–1	
Nizhny Novgorod	1–0	1–1	0–0	1–2	0–0	2–1	1–0					0–1		1–3	1–1	2–2		0–2	2–1	1–3
Neftekhimik Nizhnekamsk	2–1	1–1				1–0	2–2	1–0	1–1		1–1		1–2	2–2	2–2		1–2		1–0	1–0
Rotor Volgograd					1–1	2–0	1–1	0–0	2–0		2–1	1–1		2–3	5–3		3–2	2–0	0–2	2–1
Shinnik Yaroslavl	1–1	1–3	0–2	2–3			0–1		3–1	1–0	1–3		0–1			3–2	3–0	2–1		0–0
SKA-Khabarovsk	3–0	1–0	2–0	3–2	0–0	1–0	1–1			1–2	2–0			1–2		3–0		1–1	0–1	2–0
Spartak-2 Moscow	1–3	1–1				7–2		0–3	0–2	2–0	2–0	0–3	0–1		2–2		1–2		2–3	2–0
Tekstilshchik Ivanovo			1–5			1–4	1–4	1–0	4–3		0–2	1–2	0–1	1–1	3–1	1–1		0–2	0–0	0–1
Tom Tomsk	2–0	2–0	0–0	3–1			0–0	2–1	4–0	2–0		0–1	0–1			2–2	2–1			0–0
Torpedo Moscow	2–1	3–1	2–0	2–1	0–1		1–0	2–1	0–2	2–2	0–2			2–0	2–1		3–1	2–1		2–0
Yenisey Krasnoyarsk	1–1	1–1	2–2	1–3	0–2		1–0	0–1		2–1		2–2	0–3	1–3		1–0		3–0		

Updated to match(es) played on 15 March 2020. Source: Soccerway
Legend: Blue = home team win; Yellow = draw; Red = away team win.

== Statistics ==
=== Top goalscorers ===
As of match played 15 March 2020

Rank	Player	Club	Goals
1	(Russia) Aleksandr Rudenko	Spartak-2/Torpedo	14
1	(Russia) Ivan Sergeyev	Torpedo	14
3	(Russia) Denis Makarov	Neftekhimik	11
3	(Russia) Mikhail Markin	Baltika	11
3	(Russia) German Onugkha	Krasnodar-2	11
3	(Russia) Merabi Uridia	Neftekhimik	11
7	(Russia) Sergey Samodin	Shinnik	10
7	(Russia) Vladislav Sarveli	Chertanovo	10
9	(Russia) Adlan Katsayev	SKA-Khabarovsk	9
9	(Russia) Eldar Nizamutdinov	Shinnik	9
9	(Russia) Mukhammad Sultonov	Rotor	9
