= FC Khimki-M =

Khimki-M
- Full name: Football Club Khimki-M
- Nickname: Krasno-chyornye (The Red-Blacks)
- Founded: 1997
- Dissolved: 2025
- Owner: FC Khimki
- 2024: Russian Second League, Division B, Group 3, 6th
- Website: fckhimki.ru
Home colours	Away colours

FC Khimki-M (Russian: «Химки-М» (Химки)) was a Russian football club based in Khimki. It acted as the reserve team for FC Khimki.

== History ==
The club was founded in 1997 and played at amateur level until the 2018–19 season, when it was licensed to play in the third-tier Russian Professional Football League. On 24 May 2025, the parent club FC Khimki was denied the license for the Russian Premier League due to accumulated debts and was administratively relegated. On 30 May, Khimki announced that the reserve team dissolved and proceeded to drop out of the 2025 Russian Second League Division B.
