= Tavrichesky =

Tavrichesky (masculine), Tavricheskaya (feminine), or Tavricheskoye (neuter) may refer to:

- Tavrichesky District, a district of Omsk Oblast, Russia
- Tavrichesky (inhabited locality) (Tavricheskaya, Tavricheskoye), name of several inhabited localities in Russia
- Taurida Governorate (Tavricheskaya guberniya), a historical province of the Russian Empire centered around the Crimea
- Tauride Palace (Tavrichesky dvorets), a historic palace in St. Petersburg, Russia
