= Kirill Gotsuk =

Russian footballer

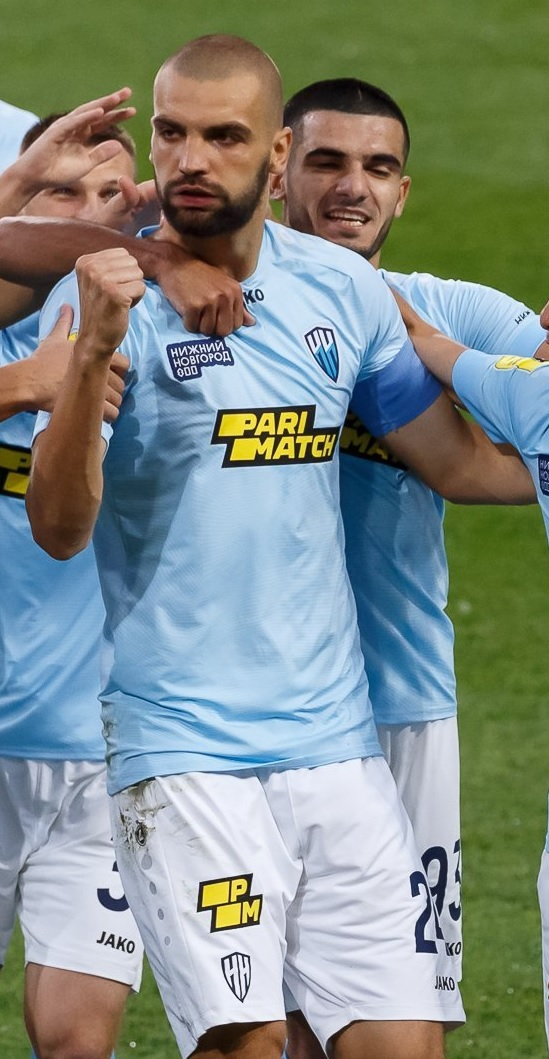
- Gotsuk with FC Nizhny Novgorod in 2021

Personal information
- Full name: Kirill Vadimovich Gotsuk
- Date of birth: 10 September 1992 (age 34)
- Place of birth: Yelets, Russia
- Height: 1.94 m (6 ft 4 in)
- Position: Centre-back

Team information
- Current team: Arsenal Tula
- Number: 24

Youth career
- DFK Orlyonok Yelets
- Avangard Yelets

Senior career*
Years	Team	Apps	(Gls)
2009	Yelets	7	(0)
2010–2012	Yelets (amateur)		
2012–2016	Metallurg Lipetsk	93	(7)
2016–2017	Shinnik Yaroslavl	35	(2)
2017–2019	Krylia Sovetov Samara	18	(0)
2018–2019	→ Avangard Kursk (loan)	67	(4)
2020–2025	Pari Nizhny Novgorod	146	(12)
2025–2026	Serikspor	17	(1)
2026	Torpedo Moscow	12	(0)
2026–	Arsenal Tula	0	(0)
- * Club domestic league appearances and goals as of 30 May 2026

Kirill Vadimovich Gotsuk (Russian: Кирилл Вадимович Гоцук; born 10 September 1992) is a Russian professional football player who plays as a centre-back for Arsenal Tula.

== Club career ==
He made his Russian Football National League debut for Shinnik Yaroslavl on 11 July 2016 in a game against Baltika Kaliningrad.

He played in the 2017–18 Russian Cup final for Avangard Kursk on 9 May 2018 in the Volgograd Arena against 2–1 winners Tosno.

He made his Russian Premier League debut for Nizhny Novgorod on 26 July 2021 in a game against Sochi.

On 22 September 2023, Gotsuk extended his contract with Pari Nizhny Novgorod to June 2025. Gotsuk left Pari on 18 June 2025 as his contract expired.

== Honors ==
- Russian Cup runner-up:2017-18
- FNL Cup:2019

Individual

- FNL Cup Best Defender:2019

== Career statistics ==
As of match played 31 May 2025

Appearances and goals by club, season and competition
Club	Season	League			Cup		Europe		Other		Total	
Club	Season	Division	Apps	Goals	Apps	Goals	Apps	Goals	Apps	Goals	Apps	Goals
Yelets	2009	Russian Second League	7	0	0	0	–		–		7	0
Metallurg Lipetsk	2012–13	Russian Second League	25	2	1	0	–		–		26	2
Metallurg Lipetsk	2013–14	Russian Second League	20	1	2	1	–		–		22	2
Metallurg Lipetsk	2014–15	Russian Second League	26	3	3	0	–		–		29	3
Metallurg Lipetsk	2015–16	Russian Second League	22	1	2	0	–		–		24	1
Metallurg Lipetsk	Total		93	7	8	1	0	0	0	0	101	8
Shinnik Yaroslavl	2016–17	Russian First League	35	2	2	0	–		5 (Note: Appearances in the FNL Cup)	0	42	2
Krylia Sovetov Samara	2017–18	Russian First League	18	0	2	0	–		1	0	21	0
Avangard Kursk	2017–18	Russian First League	11	0	3	0	–		–		14	0
Avangard Kursk	2018–19	Russian First League	34	2	2	1	–		5	0	41	3
Avangard Kursk	2019–20	Russian First League	22	2	1	0	–		–		23	2
Avangard Kursk	Total		67	4	6	1	0	0	5	0	78	5
Nizhny Novgorod	2019–20	Russian First League	2	0	–		–		–		2	0
Nizhny Novgorod	2020–21	Russian First League	40	5	2	0	–		–		42	5
Nizhny Novgorod	2021–22	Russian Premier League	27	3	2	0	–		–		29	3
Nizhny Novgorod	2022–23	Russian Premier League	27	3	4	0	–		2 (Note: Appearances in Relegation play-offs)	0	33	3
Nizhny Novgorod	2023–24	Russian Premier League	25	1	4	0	–		2	0	31	1
Nizhny Novgorod	2024–25	Russian Premier League	25	0	4	2	–		2	0	31	2
Nizhny Novgorod	Total		146	12	16	2	0	0	6	0	168	14
Career total			366	25	34	4	0	0	17	0	417	29
