= Ivan Yagan (writer) =

Russian writer (1934–2022)

- Born: 30 September 1934; Baydakovka, Tavrichesky District, West Siberian Krai, Russian SFSR, Soviet Union
- Died: 24 March 2022 (aged 87)
- Education: Ural State University
- Occupation: Writer

Ivan Yagan (30 September 1934 – 24 March 2022) was a Russian writer.

== Life and career ==
Yagan was born in Baydakovka, Tavrichesky District. He had written poems as a teenager, before serving in the Russian Navy. After being discharged, he moved to Omsk where he was an editor for numerous newspapers and also a literature consultant for the Omsk Writers' Organization. He attended Ural State University, graduating in 1955. Yagan became a member of the Union of Soviet Writers in 1956. He served as an executive secretary for the Union of Writers of Russia from 1974 to 2008,

Yagan wrote a book titled, The Many Faces and Original (Notes on the Literature of the Trans-Urals), which was published in Kurgan in 2007. He was honored with the Medal of the Order "For Merit to the Fatherland" 2nd class, Medal "For Valiant Labour in the Great Patriotic War 1941–1945" and jubilee medals, such as the Jubilee Medal "50 Years of Victory in the Great Patriotic War 1941–1945", Jubilee Medal "60 Years of Victory in the Great Patriotic War 1941–1945", Jubilee Medal "65 Years of Victory in the Great Patriotic War 1941–1945", Jubilee Medal "70 Years of Victory in the Great Patriotic War 1941–1945", Jubilee Medal "75 Years of Victory in the Great Patriotic War 1941–1945" and Jubilee Medal "In Commemoration of the 100th Anniversary of the Birth of Vladimir Ilyich Lenin". Yagan was also honored as Honored Cultural Worker of the RSFSR, and the Honorary Citizen of Kurgan Oblast in 2011.

Yagan died in March 2022, at the age of 87.
