= Shakhov =

Shakhov (Russian: Шахов), feminine: Shakhova is a Russian and Ukrainian surname. Notable persons with that name include:

- Albert Shakhov, Ukrainian footballer
- Maksim Shakhov
- Mikhail Shakhov (1931–2018), Ukrainian wrestler
- Ninel Shakhova (1935–2005), Russian television journalist
- Serafima Schachova (born 1854), Ukrainian nephrologist
- Serhii Shakhov
- Vitali Shakhov (born 1991), Russian footballer
- Yevhen Shakhov (footballer, born 1962), Soviet and Ukrainian football player and coach, father of the man born 1990
- Yevhen Shakhov (footballer, born 1990), Ukrainian footballer, son of the man born 1962
- Yuliya Shakhova
