= 2021–22 FC Nizhny Novgorod season =

Nizhny Novgorod
2021–22 season
- Owner: City of Nizhny Novgorod
- Chairman: Maksim Metlin
- Head coach: Aleksandr Kerzhakov
- Stadium: Nizhny Novgorod Stadium
- Premier League: 11th
- Russian Cup: Round of 16 vs Dynamo Moscow
- Top goalscorer: League: Nikolay Kalinsky (8); All: Nikolay Kalinsky (8)
- Highest home attendance: 30,235 vs Zenit St.Petersburg (21 May 2022)
- Lowest home attendance: 0 vs Ufa (14 August 2021)
- Average home league attendance: 6,260 (21 May 2022)
Home colours	Away colours
- All statistics correct as of 21 May 2022.

The 2021–22 season was the seventh season in the existence of FC Nizhny Novgorod and the club's first season in the top flight of Russian football. In addition to the domestic league, FC Nizhny Novgorod participated in this season's editions of the Russian Cup, where they were eliminated in round of sixteen.

== Season events ==
On 16 March, Nizhny Novgorod suspended their contract with Lars Olden Larsen, and terminated their contract with Sylvester Igboun by mutual consent.

== Players ==
Note: Flags indicate national team as defined under FIFA eligibility rules; some limited exceptions apply. Players may hold more than one non-FIFA nationality.

No.	Pos.	Nation	Player
1	GK	RUS	Artur Anisimov
2	DF	RUS	Viktor Aleksandrov (on loan from Rubin Kazan)
4	DF	HUN	Ákos Kecskés
5	DF	ARG	Lucas Masoero
6	DF	UZB	Ibrokhimkhalil Yuldoshev
7	FW	CAN	Richie Ennin (on loan from Spartaks Jūrmala)
13	GK	RUS	Nikita Goylo (on loan from Zenit St. Petersburg)
14	MF	RUS	Kirill Kravtsov (on loan from Zenit St. Petersburg)
15	DF	SRB	Ivan Miladinović (on loan from Sochi)
17	MF	RUS	Igor Gorbunov
22	DF	RUS	Nikita Kakkoyev
23	DF	RUS	Daniil Penchikov

No.	Pos.	Nation	Player
24	DF	RUS	Kirill Gotsuk
25	GK	RUS	Artur Nigmatullin
27	FW	ANG	Felício Milson
31	MF	RUS	Denis Tkachuk
34	DF	RUS	Aleksei Kozlov
37	MF	RUS	Albert Sharipov
77	MF	RUS	Pavel Karasyov
78	MF	RUS	Nikolay Kalinsky
88	MF	RUS	Ilya Berkovski (on loan from Lokomotiv Moscow)
89	DF	RUS	Dmitry Stotsky
93	FW	RUS	Timur Suleymanov

=== Contacts suspended ===
Note: Flags indicate national team as defined under FIFA eligibility rules; some limited exceptions apply. Players may hold more than one non-FIFA nationality.

No.	Pos.	Nation	Player
10	MF	NOR	Lars Olden Larsen

=== Out on loan ===
Note: Flags indicate national team as defined under FIFA eligibility rules; some limited exceptions apply. Players may hold more than one non-FIFA nationality.

No. / Pos. / Nation / Player; — / MF / RUS / Aleksandr Sapeta (at Kuban Krasnodar)	No. / Pos. / Nation / Player; — / FW / BLR / Aleksandr Shestyuk (at RFS)

== Transfers ==
=== In ===
Date	Position	Nationality	Name	Joined	Date	Ref.
26 June 2021	FW	(Russia)	Timur Suleymanov	Lokomotiv Moscow	Undisclosed	
1 July 2021	MF	(Russia)	Denis Tkachuk	Orenburg	Undisclosed	
8 July 2021	GK	(Russia)	Artur Nigmatullin	Arsenal Tula	Undisclosed	
9 July 2021	DF	(Russia)	Aleksei Kozlov	Rostov	Undisclosed	
10 July 2021	DF	(Argentina)	Lucas Masoero	Lokomotiv Plovdiv	Undisclosed	
16 July 2021	DF	(Russia)	Daniil Penchikov	Tom Tomsk	Undisclosed	
18 July 2021	MF	(Russia)	Pavel Mogilevets	Khimki	Undisclosed	
21 July 2021	FW	(Albania)	Bekim Balaj	Sturm Graz	Undisclosed	
29 July 2021	DF	(Hungary)	Ákos Kecskés	Lugano	Undisclosed	
25 August 2021	GK	(Russia)	Andrei Sinitsyn	Akron Tolyatti	Undisclosed	
26 August 2021	DF	(Uzbekistan)	Ibrokhimkhalil Yuldoshev	Pakhtakor Tashkent	Undisclosed	
7 September 2021	MF	(Cameroon)	Petrus Boumal	BB Erzurumspor	Undisclosed	
16 January 2022	MF	(Russia)	Pavel Karasyov	BATE Borisov	Undisclosed	
16 January 2022	FW	(Belarus)	Aleksandr Shestyuk	Dinamo Brest	Undisclosed	
26 January 2022	DF	(Russia)	Dmitry Stotsky	Krasnodar	Free	
5 February 2022	MF	(Norway)	Lars Larsen	Mjøndalen	Undisclosed	
12 February 2022	MF	(Angola)	Felício Milson	Marítimo	Undisclosed	
20 February 2022	FW	(Nigeria)	Sylvester Igboun	Dynamo Moscow	Free	

=== Loans in ===
Date from	Position	Nationality	Name	From	Date to	Ref.
19 June 2021	MF	(Russia)	Ilya Berkovski	Lokomotiv Moscow	End of season	
27 July 2021	DF	(Serbia)	Ivan Miladinović	Sochi	End of season	
17 August 2021	FW	(Canada)	Richie Ennin	Spartaks Jūrmala	End of season	
20 August 2021	FW	(Russia)	Kirill Kosarev	Rubin Kazan	22 February 2022	
4 February 2022	GK	(Russia)	Nikita Goylo	Zenit St.Petersburg	End of season	
11 February 2022	MF	(Russia)	Kirill Kravtsov	Zenit St.Petersburg	End of season	
15 February 2022	DF	(Russia)	Viktor Aleksandrov	Rubin Kazan	End of season	

=== Out ===
Date	Position	Nationality	Name	Joined	Date	Ref.
8 June 2021	DF	(Russia)	Aleksei Shumskikh	Torpedo Moscow	Undisclosed	
10 June 2021	FW	(Georgia (country))	Beka Kavtaradze	Rotor Volgograd	Undisclosed	
14 June 2021	DF	(Russia)	Oleg Smirnov	Volgar Astrakhan	Undisclosed	
18 June 2021	MF	(Russia)	Artyom Popov	Baltika Kaliningrad	Undisclosed	
26 June 2021	DF	(Russia)	Ivan Temnikov	Torpedo Moscow	Undisclosed	
1 July 2021	MF	(Russia)	Mikhail Gashchenkov	Akzhayik	Undisclosed	
1 July 2021	MF	(Russia)	Aleksandr Stavpets	Tom Tomsk	Undisclosed	
1 July 2021	FW	(Guinea)	Momo Yansané	Sheriff Tiraspol	Undisclosed	
2 July 2021	FW	(Russia)	Mukhammad Sultonov	Torpedo Moscow	Undisclosed	
8 July 2021	DF	(Russia)	Ismail Ediyev	Kuban Krasnodar	Undisclosed	
20 July 2021	FW	(Russia)	Dmitri Yugaldin	Irtysh Omsk	Undisclosed	
27 July 2021	DF	(Russia)	Sergei Zuykov	Tom Tomsk	Undisclosed	

=== Loans out ===
Date from	Position	Nationality	Name	From	Date to	Ref.
27 January 2022	MF	(Russia)	Aleksandr Sapeta	Kuban Krasnodar	End of season	
16 February 2022	FW	(Belarus)	Aleksandr Shestyuk	RFS	End of season	

=== Contract suspensions ===
Date	Position	Nationality	Name	Joined	Date	Ref.
16 March 2022	MF	(Norway)	Lars Olden Larsen	BK Häcken	30 June 2022	

=== Released ===
Date	Position	Nationality	Name	Joined	Date	Ref.
30 June 2021	DF	(Russia)	Kirill Malyarov	Shakhter Karagandy		
17 August 2021	MF	(Russia)	Pavel Komolov	Retired		
30 7 September 2021	GK	(Russia)	Nikolai Sysuyev	Orenburg		
17 December 2021	GK	(Russia)	Andrei Sinitsyn	Dynamo Makhachkala		
17 December 2021	MF	(Cameroon)	Petrus Boumal	Újpest	15 February 2022	
17 December 2021	FW	(Russia)	Artyom Galadzhan	Tom Tomsk		
31 December 2021	MF	(Russia)	Pavel Mogilevets	Bunyodkor		
16 January 2022	FW	(Albania)	Bekim Balaj	Boluspor	30 January 2022	
16 March 2022	MF	(Nigeria)	Sylvester Igboun	NorthEast United	20 September 2022	

== Friendlies ==
19 July 2021	CSKA Moscow	2 – 1	Nizhny Novgorod	Moscow
17:00 MSK (UTC+3)	Akhmetov 28', 85' (yellow card) 90'; Kuchayev (yellow card) 44'; Vasin (yellow card) 66'	Report	Sapeta 67' (pen.)	Stadium: VEB Arena

10 October 2021	CSKA Moscow	1 – 1	Nizhny Novgorod	Moscow
12:00 MSK (UTC+3)	Chalov 47' (penalty missed) 86'; Nababkin (yellow card) 80'	Report	Masoero (yellow card) 15'; Berkovski (yellow card) 38'; Kosarev 76'	Stadium: VEB Arena

26 March 2022	CSKA Moscow	2 – 0	Nizhny Novgorod	Moscow
12:00 MSK (UTC+3)	Tarba (yellow card) 65'; Yakovlev 68', 71'; Yeleyev (yellow card) 74'; Lukin (yellow card) 85'	Report	Gotsuk (yellow card) 15'; Kakkoyev (yellow card) 72'; Karasyov (yellow card) 79'	Stadium: VEB Arena

== Competitions ==
=== Overview ===
Competition	First match	Last match	Starting round	Final position	Record							
Competition	First match	Last match	Starting round	Final position	Pld	W	D	L	GF	GA	GD	Win %
Premier League	26 July 2021	21 May 2022	Matchday 1	11th	30	8	9	13	26	39	−13	26.67
Russian Cup	22 September 2021	1 March 2022	Round of 32	Round of 16	3	2	0	1	2	3	−1	66.67
Total					33	10	9	14	28	42	−14	30.30

Last updated: 21 May 2022
Source: Soccerway

=== Premier League ===
==== League table ====
Pos	Team	Pld	W	D	L	GF	GA	GD	Pts	Qualification or relegation
9	Rostov	30	10	8	12	47	51	−4	38 (Note: Head-to-head points: Rostov 4, Spartak Moscow 1.)	
10	Spartak Moscow	30	10	8	12	37	41	−4	38	
11	Nizhny Novgorod	30	8	9	13	26	39	−13	33 (Note: Head-to-head points: Nizhny Novgorod 4, Ural Yekaterinburg 1.)	
12	Ural Yekaterinburg	30	8	9	13	27	35	−8	33	
13	Khimki (O)	30	7	11	12	34	47	−13	32	Qualification for the relegation play-offs

Source: Premier Liga
Rules for classification: 1) Points; 2) Head-to-head points; 3) Head-to-head matches won; 4) Head-to-head goal difference; 5) Head-to-head goals scored; 6) Matches won; 7) Goal difference; 8) Goals scored; 9) 2020–21 position (not applicable to final standings); 10) Play-off.
(O) Play-off winners

==== Results summary ====
Overall								Home						Away					
Pld	W	D	L	GF	GA	GD	Pts	W	D	L	GF	GA	GD	W	D	L	GF	GA	GD
30	8	9	13	27	39	−12	33	4	3	8	13	19	−6	4	6	5	14	20	−6

Last updated: 21 May 2022.
Source: FBref

==== Results by round ====
Round	1	2	3	4	5	6	7	8	9	10	11	12	13	14	15	16	17	18	19	20	21	22	23	24	25	26	27	28	29	30
Ground	H	A	A	H	H	A	A	H	H	A	А	H	Н	A	А	H	Н	A	H	A	A	H	A	H	H	A	A	H	A	H
Result	W	D	W	L	L	D	W	L	L	W	L	L	L	L	L	D	W	D	W	L	D	D	W	L	D	L	D	L	D	W
Position	8	5	5	6	7	9	6	8	10	8	10	11	11	13	13	14	13	13	10	11	11	11	9	11	11	12	11	11	11	11

Updated to match(es) played on 21 May 2022. Source: Premier Liga
A = Away; H = Home; W = Win; D = Draw; L = Loss

==== Matches ====
26 July 2021 1	Nizhny Novgorod	1 – 0	Sochi	Nizhny Novgorod
19:00 MSK (UTC+3)	Kakkoyev (yellow card) 15'; Gorbunov 68'; Sapeta (yellow card) 77'	Report	Popov (yellow card) 75'	Stadium: Nizhny Novgorod Stadium; Attendance: 487; Referee: Pavel Shadyhanov

1 August 2021 2	Ural Yekaterinburg	1 – 1	Nizhny Novgorod	Yekaterinburg
17:30 MSK (UTC+3)	Panyukov 32'	Report	Suleymanov 55'	Stadium: Central Stadium; Attendance: 482; Referee: Aleksey Amelin

7 August 2021 3	Spartak Moscow	1 – 2	Nizhny Novgorod	Moscow
20:00 MSK (UTC+3)	Sobolev (yellow card) 63'; Rasskazov (yellow card) 81'; Ponce 86'	Report	Gotsuk 4'; Kozlov 16'; Kalinsky (yellow card) 90+'; Nigmatullin (yellow card) 90+'	Stadium: Otkritie Arena; Attendance: 2,849; Referee: Aleksey Sukhoy

14 August 2021 4	Nizhny Novgorod	1 – 2	Ufa	Nizhny Novgorod
17:30 MSK (UTC+3)	Gorbunov (yellow card) 14'; Kecskés 57'; Nigmatullin (yellow card) 63'; Masoero (yellow card) 76' Suleymanov (yellow card) 90+'	Report	Kamilov (yellow card) 24'; Agalarov 48'; Cacintura (yellow card) 61'; Ivanov 65' (pen.) (yellow card) 90+'; Mrzljak (yellow card) 75'	Stadium: Nizhny Novgorod Stadium; Attendance: 482; Referee: Vasiliy Kazartsev

22 August 2021 5	Nizhny Novgorod	1 – 2	Rostov	Nizhny Novgorod
18:00 MSK (UTC+3)	Osipenko 3' (o.g.); Tkachuk (yellow card) 57'; Gotsuk (yellow card) 87'	Report	Hashimoto 36'; Hadžikadunić (yellow card) 42'; Normann (yellow card) 78'; Bastos (yellow card) 80'; Masoero 89' (o.g.)	Stadium: Nizhny Novgorod Stadium; Attendance: 991; Referee: Evgeny Kukulyak

27 August 2021 6	Khimki	1 – 1	Nizhny Novgorod	Khimki
18:30 MSK (UTC+3)	Dagerstål (yellow card) 40'; Glushakov (yellow card) 45' (goal) 54' (pen.); Kamyshev (red card) 88'	Report	Kozlov 35'; Tkachuk (yellow card) 76'; Masoero (yellow card) 80'	Stadium: Arena Khimki; Attendance: 510; Referee: Vladimir Moskalyov

12 September 2021 7	Dynamo Moscow	1 – 2	Nizhny Novgorod	Moscow
19:00 MSK (UTC+3)	Makarov 11'; Varela (yellow card) 71'; N'Jie (penalty missed) 90'	Report	Masoero (yellow card) 8' (yellow-red card) 89'; Suleymanov (penalty missed) 51'; Yuldoshev (yellow card) 56'; Gorbunov 74'; Kalinsky 83'	Stadium: VTB Arena; Attendance: 7,146; Referee: Vitali Meshkov

19 September 2021 8	Nizhny Novgorod	2 – 3	Arsenal Tula	Nizhny Novgorod
16:30 MSK (UTC+3)	Kalinsky 9' (yellow card) 75'; Kozlov 85'; Gotsuk (yellow card) 90+'	Report	Čaušić 17', 90+' (yellow card) 90+'; Sukhanov (yellow card) 32'; Markov 45+'	Stadium: Nizhny Novgorod Stadium; Attendance: 497; Referee: Artyom Lyubimov

27 September 2021 9	Nizhny Novgorod	0 – 2	CSKA Moscow	Nizhny Novgorod
19:00 MSK (UTC+3)	Tkachuk (yellow card) 29'; Balaj (yellow card) 38'; Gotsuk (yellow card) 85'	Report	Zaynutdinov 31'; Akhmetov 63' (pen.)	Stadium: Nizhny Novgorod Stadium; Attendance: 2,996; Referee: Kirill Levnikov

2 October 2021 10	Rubin Kazan	0 – 1	Nizhny Novgorod	Kazan
14:00 MSK (UTC+3)	Kvaratskhelia (penalty missed) 49'	Report	Kozlov (yellow card) 35'; Kalinsky 61' (pen.)	Stadium: Ak Bars Arena; Attendance: 3,986; Referee: Sergei Karasev

17 October 2021 11	Krylia Sovetov	2 – 0	Nizhny Novgorod	Samara
16:30 MSK (UTC+3)	Sarveli 36', 50'	Report	Suleymanov (yellow card) 58'; Gorbunov (yellow card) 72'; Kalinsky (penalty missed) 83'	Stadium: Solidarnost Arena; Attendance: 997; Referee: Aleksey Amelin

23 October 2021 12	Nizhny Novgorod	1 – 4	Krasnodar	Nizhny Novgorod
14:00 MSK (UTC+3)	Penchikov (yellow card) 64'; Kosarev (yellow card) 80'; Gotsuk 83' (yellow card) 90'; Suleymanov (yellow card) 83'	Report	Krychowiak 5'; Córdoba (yellow card) 20' (penalty missed) 70'; Spertsyan 56'; Chernikov 73' (yellow card) 89'; Ilyin 76'; Safonov (yellow card) 83'	Stadium: Nizhny Novgorod Stadium; Attendance: 2,857; Referee: Aleksei Matyunin

30 October 2021 13	Nizhny Novgorod	1 – 2	Lokomotiv Moscow	Nizhny Novgorod
19:00 MSK (UTC+3)	Berkovski 31'; Kalinsky (yellow card) 80'; Sinitsyn (yellow card) 90+'; Suleymanov (yellow card) 90+'	Report	Maradishvili (yellow card) 21'; Zhemaletdinov 38'; Anjorin (yellow card) 51'; Beka Beka (yellow card) 59'; Rybus (yellow card) 85'; Miladinović 90+' (o.g.)	Stadium: Nizhny Novgorod Stadium; Attendance: 2,912; Referee: Aleksey Suhoy

7 November 2021 14	Akhmat Grozny	3 – 1	Nizhny Novgorod	Grozny
19:00 MSK (UTC+3)	Konovalov (yellow card) 14'; Konaté 39'; Penchikov 72' (o.g.); Sadulayev (yellow card) 79'; Utkin 90'	Report	Kalinsky (yellow card) 37'; Kosarev 54'	Stadium: Akhmat-Arena; Attendance: 6,729; Referee: Vladislav Bezborodov

19 November 2021 15	Zenit St.Petersburg	5 – 1	Nizhny Novgorod	Saint Petersburg
19:00 MSK (UTC+3)	Malcom 24'; Dzyuba 34', 45+', 60'; Chistyakov 88'; Azmoun (yellow card) 90+'; Barrios (yellow card) 90+'; Sutormin (yellow card) 90+'	Report	Kozlov 34'; Boumal (yellow card) 41' (yellow-red card) 43'; Gorbunov (yellow card) 54'; Miladinović (yellow card) 90'; Sapeta (yellow card) 90+'	Stadium: Krestovsky Stadium; Attendance: 16,575; Referee: Pavel Kukuyan^{ru}

28 November 2021 16	Nizhny Novgorod	0 – 0	Krylia Sovetov	Nizhny Novgorod
14:00 MSK (UTC+3)	Suleymanov (yellow card) 31'; Sharipov (yellow card) 64'	Report	Gorshkov (yellow card) 42'; Zinkovsky (yellow card) 58'	Stadium: Nizhny Novgorod Stadium; Attendance: 1,775; Referee: Vitali Meshkov

5 December 2021 17	Nizhny Novgorod	2 – 1	Rubin Kazan	Nizhny Novgorod
16:30 MSK (UTC+3)	Kalinsky 2' (pen.), 42'; Tkachuk (yellow card) 78'	Report	Dreyer 28'; Zotov (yellow card) 40'; Kvaratskhelia (yellow card) 51'; Hwang (yellow card) 78'	Stadium: Nizhny Novgorod Stadium; Attendance: 1,789; Referee: Artyom Chistyakov

12 December 2021 18	Krasnodar	0 – 0	Nizhny Novgorod	Krasnodar
19:00 MSK (UTC+3)	Sorokin (yellow card) 23'; Martynovich (yellow card) 40'; Claesson (yellow card) 76'; Apekov (yellow card) 90+'	Report	Miladinović (yellow card) 62'; Balaj (yellow card) 74'; Sapeta (yellow card) 90+'	Stadium: Krasnodar Stadium; Attendance: 10,554; Referee: Evgeny Kukulyak

26 February 2022 19	Nizhny Novgorod	1 – 0	Ural Yekaterinburg	Nizhny Novgorod
14:00 MSK (UTC+3)	Aleksandrov (yellow card) 66'; Kalinsky 78' (pen.)	Report	Kolesnichenko (yellow card) 38' (yellow-red card) 55'; Yegorychev (yellow card) 45+1'; Goglichidze (red card) 77'; Kuzmichyov (yellow card) 79'; Mamin (yellow card) 90'; Pomazun (yellow card) 90+3'; Zheleznov (yellow card) 90+4'	Stadium: Nizhny Novgorod Stadium; Attendance: 3,115; Referee: Vasiliy Kazartsev

5 March 2022 20	CSKA Moscow	1 – 0	Nizhny Novgorod	Moscow
19:00 MSK (UTC+3)	Carrascal (yellow card) 44'; Yazıcı (yellow card) 60' (goal) 90+6'	Report	Larsen (yellow card) 31'; Kecskés (red card) 42'	Stadium: VEB Arena; Attendance: 5,609; Referee: Pavel Kukuyan

12 March 2022 21	Ufa	0 – 0	Nizhny Novgorod	Ufa
14:00 MSK (UTC+3)	Rodrigues (yellow card) 45'; Kabutov (yellow card) 67' (yellow-red card) 90+'; Zhuravlyov (yellow card) 82'	Report	Kravtsov (yellow card) 67'; Yuldoshev (yellow card) 73'	Stadium: BetBoom Arena; Attendance: Vladislav Bezborodov; Referee: 1,602

19 March 2022 22	Nizhny Novgorod	1 – 1	Spartak Moscow	Nizhny Novgorod
14:00 MSK (UTC+3)	Ennin (yellow card) 43'; Suleymanov (yellow card) 55'; Yuldoshev 74'; Stotsky (yellow card) 75'; Kravtsov (yellow card) 88'; Nigmatullin (yellow card) 90+'	Report	Martins 72' (yellow card) 83'; Promes (penalty missed) 79'; Ignatov (yellow card) 90+'	Stadium: Nizhny Novgorod Stadium; Attendance: 18,517; Referee: Sergey Ivanov

2 April 2022 23	Rostov	1 – 2	Nizhny Novgorod	Rostov-on-Don
MSK (UTC+3)	Poyarkov (yellow card) 9'; Shchetinin 25'; Tugarev (yellow card) 52'	Report	Ennin 7'; Stotsky 45+'; Miladinović (yellow card) 89'	Stadium: Rostov Arena; Attendance: 10,002; Referee: Kirill Levnikov

9 April 2022 24	Nizhny Novgorod	0 – 1	Dynamo Moscow	Nizhny Novgorod
14:00 MSK (UTC+3)	Suleymanov (yellow card) 17'; Tkachuk (yellow card) 52'; Milson (yellow card) 69'; Masoero (yellow card) 88'	Report	Zakharyan (yellow card) 32'; Gotsuk 87' (o.g.)	Stadium: Nizhny Novgorod Stadium; Attendance: 14,155; Referee: Vitali Meshkov

17 April 2022 25	Nizhny Novgorod	0 – 0	Khimki	Nizhny Novgorod
19:00 MSK (UTC+3)	Suleymanov (yellow card) 35'; Stotsky (yellow card) 80'; Kecskés (yellow card) 85'	Report		Stadium: Nizhny Novgorod Stadium; Attendance: 5,977; Referee: Artyom Chistyakov

23 April 2022 26	Lokomotiv Moscow	2 – 1	Nizhny Novgorod	Moscow
16:30 MSK (UTC+3)	Zhivoglyadov (yellow card) 30'; Zhemaletdinov 37', 53' (yellow card) 81'; Rybus (yellow card) 76'; Barinov (yellow card) 88'	Report	Berkovski (red card) 72'; Kravtsov 77'; Kozlov (yellow card) 90+'	Stadium: RZD Arena; Attendance: 7,315; Referee: Evgeny Turbin

2 May 2022 27	Arsenal Tula	2 – 2	Nizhny Novgorod	Tula
19:00 MSK (UTC+3)	Sokol (yellow card) 32'; Tkachyov 45+'; Despotović (penalty missed) 66'; Lutsenko 71'; Čaušić (yellow card) 89'	Report	Gotsuk 18' (yellow card) 79'; Kalinsky 30'; Suleymanov (yellow card) 50'	Stadium: Arsenal Stadium; Attendance: 4,980; Referee: Sergei Karasev

7 May 2022 28	Nizhny Novgorod	0 – 1	Akhmat Grozny	Nizhny Novgorod
16:30 MSK (UTC+3)	Gotsuk (yellow card) 18'; Gorbunov (yellow card) 81'	Report	Berisha (yellow card) 29'; Utsiyev (red card) 53'; Troshechkin 74'; Bogosavac (yellow card) 89'; Sheliya (yellow card) 90'	Stadium: Nizhny Novgorod Stadium; Attendance: 7,116; Referee: Jan Bobrovsky

13 May 2022 29	Sochi	0 – 0	Nizhny Novgorod	Sochi
19:00 MSK (UTC+3)	Yusupov (yellow card) 60'	Report	Ennin (yellow card) 45' (yellow-red card) 47'; Yuldoshev (yellow card) 75'; Goylo (yellow card) 90+'	Stadium: Fisht Olympic Stadium; Attendance: 5,837; Referee: Kirill Levnikov

21 May 2022 30	Nizhny Novgorod	1 – 0	Zenit St.Petersburg	Nizhny Novgorod
17:00 MSK (UTC+3)	Kalinsky 20' (pen.); Karasyov (yellow card) 85'	Report	Ozdoyev (yellow card) 19'	Stadium: Nizhny Novgorod Stadium; Attendance: 30,235; Referee: Vitali Meshkov

=== Russian Cup ===
==== Group stage ====
Pos	Team	Pld	W	D	L	GF	GA	GD	Pts	Qualification
1	Nizhny Novgorod (Q)	2	2	0	0	2	0	+2	6	Advance to Play-off
2	Fakel Voronezh	2	1	0	1	2	1	+1	3	
3	Dynamo Barnaul	2	0	0	2	0	3	−3	0	

(Q) Qualified for the phase indicated

22 September 2021 Group stage	Dynamo Barnaul	0–1	Nizhny Novgorod	Barnaul
10:30 MSK (UTC+3)	Zavyalov (yellow card) 16'; Petukhov (yellow card) 36'; Khudyakov (yellow card) 50'	Report	Berkovski 7'; Sapeta (yellow card) 51'; Kosarev (yellow card) 64'; Pigayev (yellow card) 90+2'	Stadium: Dynamo Stadium; Referee: Igor Vertkov

27 October 2021 Group stage	Fakel Voronezh	0–1	Nizhny Novgorod	Voronezh
19:00 MSK (UTC+3)	Yermakov (red card) 37'	Report	Yuldoshev (yellow card) 35'; Berkovski 40'; Penchikov (yellow card) 45'	Stadium: Tsentralnyi Profsoyuz Stadion; Referee: Anton Frolov

==== Knockout stage ====
1 March 2022 Round of 16	Dynamo Moscow	3 – 0	Nizhny Novgorod	Moscow
20:00 MSK (UTC+3)	Fomin 45+2' (pen.); Grulyov 54', (yellow card) 60'; Smolov 86' (pen.); Makarov (yellow card) 90'	Report	Yuldoshev (yellow card) 59'; Gotsuk (yellow card) 84'	Stadium: VTB Arena

== Squad statistics ==
As of match played 21 May 2022

=== Appearances and goals ===
No.	Pos	Nat	Player	Total		Premier League		Russian Cup	
No.	Pos	Nat	Player	Apps	Goals	Apps	Goals	Apps	Goals
1	GK	(Russia) RUS	Artur Anisimov	3	0	2	0	1	0
2	DF	(Russia) RUS	Viktor Aleksandrov	4	0	2+1	0	1	0
4	DF	(Hungary) HUN	Ákos Kecskés	20	1	16+3	1	1	0
5	DF	(Argentina) ARG	Lucas Masoero	27	0	22+3	0	2	0
6	DF	(Uzbekistan) UZB	Ibrokhimkhalil Yuldoshev	21	1	17+2	1	2	0
7	FW	(Canada) CAN	Richie Ennin	21	1	18+1	1	2	0
11	FW	(Russia) RUS	Kirill Kosarev	11	1	2+7	1	2	0
13	GK	(Russia) RUS	Nikita Goylo	4	0	4	0	0	0
14	MF	(Russia) RUS	Kirill Kravtsov	12	1	11	1	0+1	0
15	DF	(Serbia) SRB	Ivan Miladinović	15	0	5+9	0	0+1	0
17	MF	(Russia) RUS	Igor Gorbunov	26	2	4+20	2	2	0
18	MF	(Russia) RUS	Pavel Mogilevets	8	0	5+1	0	2	0
19	FW	(Albania) ALB	Bekim Balaj	15	0	12+3	0	0	0
22	DF	(Russia) RUS	Nikita Kakkoyev	24	0	22	0	2	0
23	DF	(Russia) RUS	Daniil Penchikov	14	0	6+6	0	2	0
24	DF	(Russia) RUS	Kirill Gotsuk	29	3	26+1	3	2	0
25	GK	(Russia) RUS	Artur Nigmatullin	24	0	23	0	1	0
27	MF	(Angola) ANG	Felício Milson	8	0	2+5	0	1	0
31	MF	(Russia) RUS	Denis Tkachuk	21	0	11+8	0	1+1	0
34	DF	(Russia) RUS	Aleksei Kozlov	22	4	22	4	0	0
37	MF	(Russia) RUS	Albert Sharipov	24	0	17+5	0	2	0
45	MF	(Russia) RUS	Aleksandr Grunichev	1	0	0	0	0+1	0
52	DF	(Russia) RUS	Yegor Pigayev	1	0	0	0	1	0
58	MF	(Russia) RUS	Maksim Shakhov	1	0	0	0	0+1	0
77	MF	(Russia) RUS	Pavel Karasyov	3	0	0+2	0	0+1	0
78	MF	(Russia) RUS	Nikolay Kalinsky	30	8	29	8	1	0
88	MF	(Russia) RUS	Ilya Berkovski	22	3	12+8	1	1+1	2
89	DF	(Russia) RUS	Dmitry Stotsky	13	1	12	1	1	0
93	FW	(Russia) RUS	Timur Suleymanov	26	1	17+8	1	0+1	0
Players who suspended their contracts:
10	MF	(Norway) NOR	Lars Larsen	4	0	3	0	1	0
Players away from the club on loan:
41	MF	(Russia) RUS	Aleksandr Sapeta	9	0	2+6	0	1	0
Players who appeared for Nizhny Novgorod but left during the season:
9	FW	(Russia) RUS	Artyom Galadzhan	5	1	1+2	0	0+2	1
13	MF	(Cameroon) CMR	Petrus Boumal	3	0	3	0	0	0
33	GK	(Russia) RUS	Andrei Sinitsyn	3	0	1	0	1+1	0
44	MF	(Nigeria) NGR	Sylvester Igboun	2	0	0+1	0	0+1	0

=== Goal scorers ===
Place	Position	Nation	Number	Name	Premier League	Russian Cup	Total
1	MF	(Russia)	78	Nikolay Kalinsky	8	0	8
2	DF	(Russia)	34	Aleksei Kozlov	4	0	4
3	DF	(Russia)	24	Kirill Gotsuk	3	0	3
3	MF	(Russia)	88	Ilya Berkovski	1	2	3
5	MF	(Russia)	17	Igor Gorbunov	2	0	2
6	FW	(Russia)	93	Timur Suleymanov	1	0	1
6	DF	(Hungary)	4	Ákos Kecskés	1	0	1
6	FW	(Russia)	11	Kirill Kosarev	1	0	1
6	DF	(Uzbekistan)	6	Ibrokhimkhalil Yuldoshev	1	0	1
6	FW	(Canada)	7	Richie Ennin	1	0	1
6	DF	(Russia)	89	Dmitry Stotsky	1	0	1
6	MF	(Russia)	14	Kirill Kravtsov	1	0	1
6				Own goal	1	0	1
Total					26	2	28

=== Clean sheets ===
Place	Position	Nation	Number	Name	Premier League	Russian Cup	Total
1	GK	(Russia)	25	Artur Nigmatullin	6	0	6
2	GK	(Russia)	13	Nikita Goylo	2	0	2
2	GK	(Russia)	33	Andrei Sinitsyn	0	2	2
4	GK	(Russia)	1	Artur Anisimov	0	1	1
Total					8	2	10

Anisimov & Sinitsyn both played in Nizhny Novgorod 1-0 victory over Dynamo Barnaul on 22 September 2021

=== Disciplinary record ===
Number	Nation	Position	Name	Premier League		Russian Cup		Total	
Number	Nation	Position	Name	Yellow card	Red card	Yellow card	Red card	Yellow card	Red card
2	(Russia)	DF	Viktor Aleksandrov	1	0	0	0	1	0
4	(Hungary)	DF	Ákos Kecskés	1	1	0	0	1	1
5	(Argentina)	DF	Lucas Masoero	5	1	0	0	5	1
6	(Uzbekistan)	DF	Ibrokhimkhalil Yuldoshev	3	0	2	0	5	0
7	(Canada)	FW	Richie Ennin	3	1	0	0	3	1
11	(Russia)	MF	Kirill Kosarev	1	0	1	0	2	0
13	(Russia)	GK	Nikita Goylo	1	0	0	0	1	0
14	(Russia)	MF	Kirill Kravtsov	2	0	0	0	2	0
15	(Serbia)	DF	Ivan Miladinović	3	0	0	0	3	0
17	(Russia)	MF	Igor Gorbunov	4	0	0	0	4	0
19	(Albania)	MF	Bekim Balaj	2	0	0	0	2	0
22	(Russia)	DF	Nikita Kakkoyev	1	0	0	0	1	0
23	(Russia)	DF	Daniil Penchikov	1	0	1	0	2	0
24	(Russia)	DF	Kirill Gotsuk	6	0	1	0	7	0
25	(Russia)	GK	Artur Nigmatullin	3	0	0	0	3	0
27	(Angola)	MF	Felício Milson	1	0	0	0	1	0
31	(Russia)	MF	Denis Tkachuk	5	0	0	0	5	0
34	(Russia)	DF	Aleksei Kozlov	2	0	0	0	2	0
37	(Russia)	MF	Albert Sharipov	1	0	0	0	1	0
45	(Russia)	MF	Aleksandr Grunichev	0	0	1	0	1	0
77	(Russia)	MF	Pavel Karasyov	1	0	0	0	1	0
78	(Russia)	MF	Nikolay Kalinsky	4	0	0	0	4	0
88	(Russia)	MF	Ilya Berkovski	0	1	0	0	0	1
89	(Russia)	DF	Dmitry Stotsky	2	0	0	0	2	0
93	(Russia)	FW	Timur Suleymanov	9	0	0	0	9	0
Players who suspended their contracts:
10	(Norway)	MF	Lars Larsen	1	0	0	0	1	0
Players away on loan:
41	(Russia)	MF	Aleksandr Sapeta	3	0	1	0	4	0
Players who left Nizhny Novgorod during the season:
13	(Cameroon)	MF	Petrus Boumal	2	1	0	0	2	1
33	(Russia)	GK	Andrei Sinitsyn	1	0	0	0	1	0
Total				69	5	7	0	76	5
