= Nikolay Kalinsky =

Russian footballer

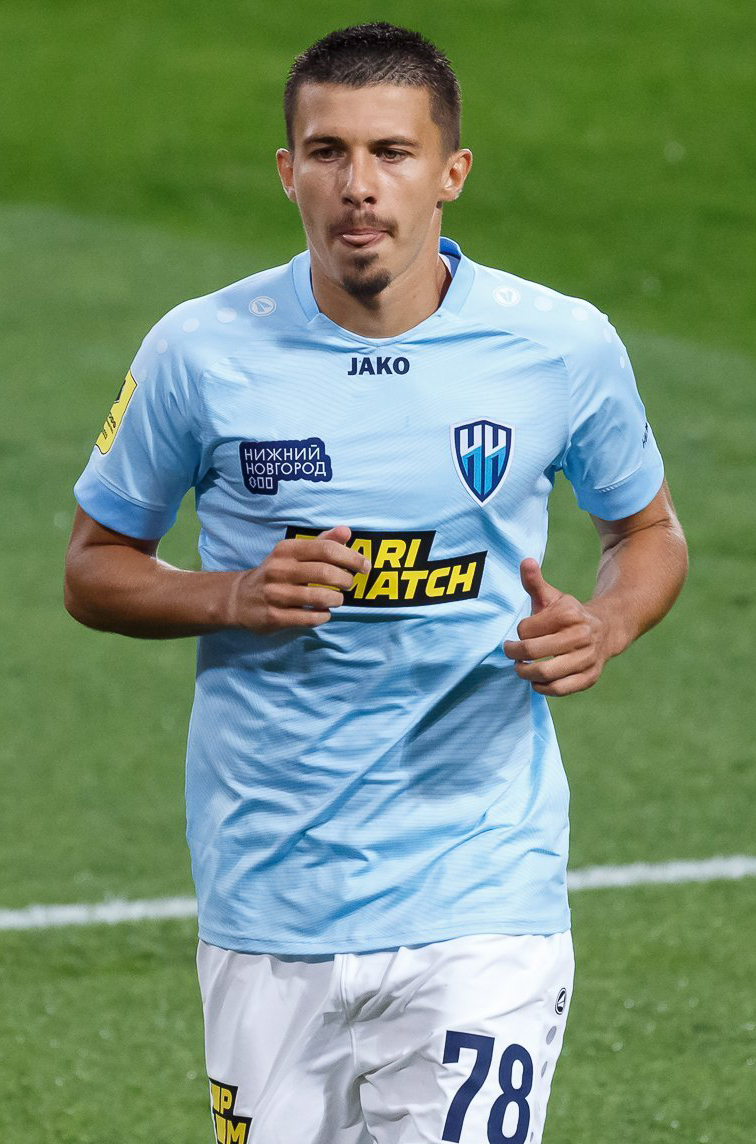
- Kalinsky with Nizhny Novgorod in 2021

Personal information
- Full name: Nikolay Nikolayevich Kalinsky
- Date of birth: 22 September 1993 (age 33)
- Place of birth: Moscow, Russia
- Height: 1.80 m (5 ft 11 in)
- Position: Midfielder

Team information
- Current team: FC Pari Nizhny Novgorod
- Number: 78

Youth career
- –2013: FC Lokomotiv Moscow

Senior career*
Years	Team	Apps	(Gls)
2013–2014	FC Kaluga	34	(9)
2015–2018	FC SKA-Khabarovsk	50	(2)
2018–2019	FC Tom Tomsk	54	(4)
2020–	FC Pari Nizhny Novgorod	140	(26)

International career
2010	Russia U-17	7	(1)
2010–2011	Russia U-18	10	(0)
2011	Russia U-19	5	(1)
- * Club domestic league appearances and goals as of 17 May 2026

Nikolay Nikolayevich Kalinsky (Russian: Никола́й Никола́евич Кали́нский; born 22 September 1993) is a Russian football player who plays as a central midfielder or defensive midfielder for FC Pari Nizhny Novgorod.

He is the brother of Russian tennis player Anna Kalinskaya.

== Club career ==
He made his debut in the Russian Professional Football League for FC Kaluga on 22 August 2013 in a game against FC Metallurg-Oskol Stary Oskol.

He made his Russian Premier League debut for FC SKA-Khabarovsk on 24 July 2017 in a game against FC Arsenal Tula.

On 22 February 2024, Kalinsky extended his contract with FC Pari Nizhny Novgorod to June 2027.

== Career statistics ==
As of match played 17 May 2026

Appearances and goals by club, season and competition
Club	Season	League			Cup		Other		Total	
Club	Season	Division	Apps	Goals	Apps	Goals	Apps	Goals	Apps	Goals
Kaluga	2013–14	Russian Second League	22	8	—		—		22	8
Kaluga	2014–15	Russian Second League	12	1	—		—		12	1
Kaluga	Total		34	9	0	0	0	0	34	9
SKA-Khabarovsk	2014–15	Russian First League	0	0	—		3 (Note: Appearances in the FNL Cup)	0	3	0
SKA-Khabarovsk	2015–16	Russian First League	13	0	1	0	—		14	0
SKA-Khabarovsk	2016–17	Russian First League	24	1	3	1	5	1	32	3
SKA-Khabarovsk	2017–18	Russian Premier League	13	1	3	1	—		16	2
SKA-Khabarovsk	Total		50	2	7	2	5	1	62	5
Tom Tomsk	2018–19	Russian First League	30	2	1	0	2 (Note: Appearances in the promotion play-offs)	0	33	2
Tom Tomsk	2019–20	Russian First League	24	2	2	0	—		26	2
Tom Tomsk	Total		54	4	3	0	2	0	59	4
Pari Nizhny Novgorod	2019–20	Russian First League	2	0	—		—		2	0
Pari Nizhny Novgorod	2020–21	Russian First League	28	6	1	0	—		29	6
Pari Nizhny Novgorod	2021–22	Russian Premier League	29	8	1	0	—		30	8
Pari Nizhny Novgorod	2022–23	Russian Premier League	22	4	5	0	2 (Note: Appearances in the relegation play-offs)	0	29	4
Pari Nizhny Novgorod	2023–24	Russian Premier League	28	7	3	0	2	0	33	7
Pari Nizhny Novgorod	2024–25	Russian Premier League	22	1	2	0	2	0	26	1
Pari Nizhny Novgorod	2025–26	Russian Premier League	9	0	1	0	—		10	0
Pari Nizhny Novgorod	Total		140	26	13	0	6	0	159	26
Career total			278	41	23	2	16	1	317	44
