= Nikita Kakkoyev =

Russian footballer (born 1999)

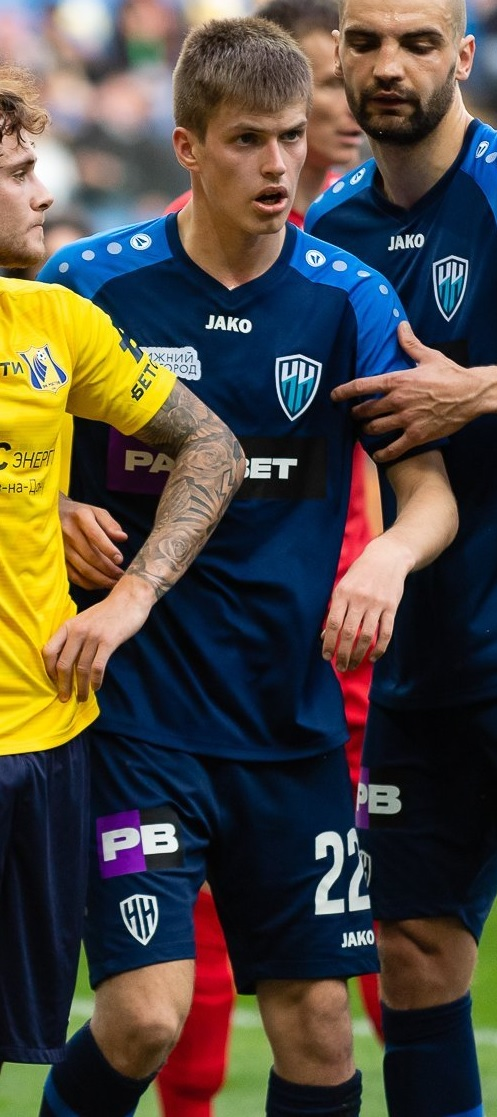
- Kakkoyev with Nizhny Novgorod in 2022

Personal information
- Full name: Nikita Igorevich Kakkoyev
- Date of birth: 22 August 1999 (age 27)
- Place of birth: Segezha, Russia
- Height: 1.85 m (6 ft 1 in)
- Position: Centre-back

Team information
- Current team: Pari Nizhny Novgorod
- Number: 22

Youth career
- –2017: Zenit Saint Petersburg

Senior career*
Years	Team	Apps	(Gls)
2017–2020	Zenit Saint Petersburg	1	(0)
2017–2019	→ Zenit-2 Saint Petersburg	23	(1)
2019–2020	→ Tom Tomsk (loan)	28	(1)
2020–	Pari Nizhny Novgorod	140	(4)

International career^{‡}
2017	Russia U18	10	(0)
2017	Russia U19	5	(0)
2018–2019	Russia U20	14	(1)
- * Club domestic league appearances and goals as of 17 May 2026 ‡ National team caps and goals as of 15 June 2019

Nikita Igorevich Kakkoyev (Russian: Никита Игоревич Каккоев; born 22 August 1999) is a Russian football player who plays for Pari NN as a centre-back.

== Club career ==
Kakkoyev made his debut in the Russian Football National League for Zenit-2 Saint Petersburg on 8 March 2017 in a game against Neftekhimik Nizhnekamsk.

He made his Russian Premier League debut for Zenit Saint Petersburg on 1 April 2018 in a game against Ufa as an 81st-minute substitute for Yuri Zhirkov.

On 21 February 2019, Kakkoyev signed with Tom Tomsk.

== Career statistics ==
As of match played 17 May 2026

Appearances and goals by club, season and competition
Club	Season	League			Cup		Europe		Other		Total	
Club	Season	Division	Apps	Goals	Apps	Goals	Apps	Goals	Apps	Goals	Apps	Goals
Zenit-2 St. Petersburg	2016–17	Russian First League	2	0	—		—		5 (Note: Appearances in the FNL Cup)	0	7	0
Zenit-2 St. Petersburg	2017–18	Russian First League	17	1	—		—		—		17	1
Zenit-2 St. Petersburg	2018–19	Russian First League	4	0	—		—		—		4	0
Zenit-2 St. Petersburg	Total		23	1	0	0	0	0	5	0	28	1
Zenit St. Petersburg	2017–18	Russian Premier League	1	0	0	0	0	0	—		1	0
Tom Tomsk	2018–19	Russian First League	9	1	—		—		2 (Note: Appearances in the promotion play-offs)	0	11	1
Tom Tomsk	2019–20	Russian First League	19	0	2	0	—		2	0	23	0
Tom Tomsk	Total		28	1	2	0	0	0	4	0	34	1
Pari Nizhny Novgorod	2020–21	Russian First League	29	2	2	0	—		—		31	2
Pari Nizhny Novgorod	2021–22	Russian Premier League	22	0	2	0	—		—		24	0
Pari Nizhny Novgorod	2022–23	Russian Premier League	21	1	5	1	—		2 (Note: Appearances in Relegation playoffs)	0	28	2
Pari Nizhny Novgorod	2023–24	Russian Premier League	25	1	5	0	—		2	0	32	1
Pari Nizhny Novgorod	2024–25	Russian Premier League	26	0	3	0	—		1	0	30	0
Pari Nizhny Novgorod	2025–26	Russian Premier League	17	0	3	0	—		—		20	0
Pari Nizhny Novgorod	Total		140	4	20	1	0	0	5	0	165	5
Career total			192	6	22	1	0	0	14	0	228	7
