= Russia national under-20 football team =

National U-20 association football team

Russia Under-20
- Nickname: Наши парни (Our Boys)
- Association: Russian Football Union
- Confederation: UEFA (Europe)
- Head coach: Mikhail Galaktionov
- FIFA code: RUS
| First colours | Second colours |

FIFA U-20 World Cup
- Appearances: 8 (6 as Soviet Union) (first in 1977)
- Best result: Champions (1977, as Soviet Union)

The Russian national under-20 football team, formerly known as the Soviet national youth football team was the under-20 (for FIFA U-20 World Cup) and under-19 (for UEFA Under-19 Championship) football teams of the Soviet Union. It ceased to exist on the breakup of the Union, and was succeeded by the Russian national under-20 football team.

Following the realignment of FIFA's youth competitions in 1977, the Soviet Union national under-20 football team was formed and competed until 1993 (in 1992 it qualified as CIS youth under-18 football team) qualifying 7 times. Following dissolution of the Soviet Union, the Soviet qualification was passed to Russia which competed in the 1993 FIFA World Youth Championship. Two years later Russia managed to qualify for the tournament on its own effort, but since then it yet to qualify for it.

On 28 February 2022, due to the Russian invasion of Ukraine and in accordance with a recommendation by the International Olympic Committee (IOC), FIFA and UEFA suspended the participation of Russia, including in the Qatar 2022 World Cup. The Russian Football Union unsuccessfully appealed the FIFA and UEFA bans to the Court of Arbitration for Sport, which upheld the bans.

== FIFA U-20 World Cup record ==
Champions Runners-up Third place Fourth place

FIFA World Youth Championship/FIFA U-20 World Cup record
| Year | Round | Position | GP | W | D* | L | GS | GA |
part of Soviet Union
| (Tunisia) 1977 | Champions | 1st | 5 | 2 | 3 | 0 | 7 | 4 |
| (Japan) 1979 | Runners-up | 2nd | 6 | 3 | 1 | 2 | 12 | 7 |
| (Australia) 1981 | Did not qualify | | | | | | | |
| (Mexico) 1983 | Group stage | 15th | 3 | 1 | 0 | 2 | 4 | 7 |
| (Soviet Union) 1985 | Fourth place | 4th | 6 | 3 | 3 | 0 | 10 | 3 |
| (Chile) 1987 | Did not qualify | | | | | | | |
| (Saudi Arabia) 1989 | Quarter-finals | 5th | 4 | 3 | 1 | 0 | 11 | 6 |
| (Portugal) 1991 | Third place | 3rd | 6 | 3 | 1 | 2 | 9 | 6 |
as Russia
| (Australia) 1993 | Quarter-finals | 7th | 4 | 2 | 0 | 2 | 6 | 7 |
| (Qatar) 1995 | Quarter-finals | 6th | 4 | 1 | 2 | 1 | 4 | 5 |
| (Malaysia) 1997 | Did not qualify | | | | | | | |
| (Nigeria) 1999 | Did not qualify | | | | | | | |
| (Argentina) 2001 | Did not qualify | | | | | | | |
| (United Arab Emirates) 2003 | Did not qualify | | | | | | | |
| (Netherlands) 2005 | Did not qualify | | | | | | | |
| (Canada) 2007 | Did not qualify | | | | | | | |
| (Egypt) 2009 | Did not qualify | | | | | | | |
| (Colombia) 2011 | Did not qualify | | | | | | | |
| (Turkey) 2013 | Did not qualify | | | | | | | |
| (New Zealand) 2015 | Did not qualify | | | | | | | |
| (South Korea) 2017 | Did not qualify | | | | | | | |
| (Poland) 2019 | Did not qualify | | | | | | | |
| (Indonesia) 2021 | Cancelled due to COVID-19 pandemic | | | | | | | |
| (Argentina) 2023 | Suspended | | | | | | | |
| (Chile) 2025 | Suspended | | | | | | | |
| (Azerbaijan) (Uzbekistan) 2027 | Suspended | | | | | | | |
| (Armenia) (Georgia (country)) 2029 | To be determined | | | | | | | |
| Total | 1 Title | 8/26 | 38 | 18 | 11 | 9 | 63 | 45 |

*Denotes draws include knockout matches decided on penalty kicks.

== Current squad ==
The following players were called up for friendly games against Croatia U-20 on 5 September 2018 and 7 September 2018.

Head coach: Mikhail Galaktionov.

| No. | Pos. | Player | Date of birth (age) | Caps | Goals | Club |
|---|---|---|---|---|---|---|
| | GK | Nikita Goylo | 10 August 1998 (age 28) | 1 | 0 | (Russian Football Union) Zenit-2 St. Petersburg |
| | GK | Nikolai Sysuyev | 19 May 1999 (age 27) | 1 | 0 | (Russian Football Union) Nizhny Novgorod |
| | DF | Igor Diveyev | 27 September 1999 (age 27) | 8 | 1 | (Russian Football Union) Ufa |
| | DF | Nikita Kakkoyev | 22 August 1999 (age 27) | 7 | 1 | (Russian Football Union) Zenit-2 St. Petersburg |
| | DF | Dmitri Gubanov | 9 February 1999 (age 27) | 6 | 0 | (Russian Football Union) Rubin Kazan |
| | DF | Danil Krugovoy | 28 May 1998 (age 28) | 2 | 0 | (Russian Football Union) Ufa-2 |
| | DF | Roman Yevgenyev | 23 February 1999 (age 27) | 2 | 0 | (Russian Football Union) Dynamo Moscow |
| | DF | Pavel Lelyukhin | 23 April 1998 (age 28) | 1 | 0 | (Cyprus Football Association) Pafos |
| | DF | Maksim Nenakhov | 13 December 1998 (age 27) | 1 | 0 | (Russian Football Union) SKA-Khabarovsk |
| | DF | Daniil Kulikov | 24 June 1998 (age 28) | 0 | 0 | (Russian Football Union) Kazanka Moscow |
| | MF | Mikhail Yakovlev | 4 March 1999 (age 27) | 8 | 2 | (Russian Football Union) Rubin Kazan |
| | MF | Gennadi Kiselyov | 3 January 1999 (age 27) | 8 | 0 | (Russian Football Union) Krylia Sovetov Samara |
| | MF | Danil Lipovoy | 22 September 1999 (age 27) | 7 | 0 | (Russian Football Union) Dynamo Moscow |
| | MF | Ilya Viznovich | 10 February 1998 (age 28) | 2 | 0 | (Russian Football Union) Luch Vladivostok |
| | MF | Georgi Makhatadze | 26 March 1998 (age 28) | 2 | 0 | (Russian Football Union) Kazanka Moscow |
| | MF | Vyacheslav Grulyov | 23 March 1999 (age 27) | 2 | 0 | (Russian Football Union) Dynamo Moscow |
| | MF | Daniil Lesovoy | 12 January 1998 (age 28) | 1 | 0 | (Russian Football Union) Arsenal Tula |
| | MF | Kirill Kaplenko | 15 June 1999 (age 27) | 1 | 0 | (Russian Football Union) Zenit-2 St. Petersburg |
| | FW | Idris Umayev | 15 January 1999 (age 27) | 7 | 0 | (Russian Football Union) Akhmat Grozny |
| | FW | Dmitri Kamenshchikov | 27 August 1998 (age 28) | 2 | 0 | (Russian Football Union) Neftekhimik Nizhnekamsk |

== Honours ==
=== FIFA U-20 World Cup ===
Individual

- Golden Ball: Vladimir Bessonov (1977)
- Golden Shoe: Oleg Salenko (1989), Sergei Sherbakov (1991)

Team

- FIFA Fair Play Award: 1991

=== Valeriy Lobanovskyi Memorial Tournament ===
- Winners: 2010

== See also ==
- FIFA U-20 World Cup
- UEFA European Under-19 Championship
- Russia women's national under-20 football team
