= Tavrichesky (inhabited locality) =

Tavrichesky (Russian: Таврический; masculine), Tavricheskaya (Таврическая; feminine), or Tavricheskoye (Таврическое; neutral) is the name of several inhabited localities in Russia.

Urban localities

- Tavricheskoye, Omsk Oblast, a work settlement in Tavrichesky District of Omsk Oblast

Rural localities

- Tavrichesky, Rostov Oblast, a khutor in Nosovskoye Rural Settlement of Neklinovsky District of Rostov Oblast
- Tavrichesky, Stavropol Krai, a settlement in Kulikovo-Kopansky Selsoviet of Turkmensky District of Stavropol Krai
- Tavricheskoye, Krasnodar Krai, a selo in Srednechuburksky Rural Okrug of Kushchyovsky District of Krasnodar Krai
