= Nikita Goylo =

Russian footballer (born 1998)

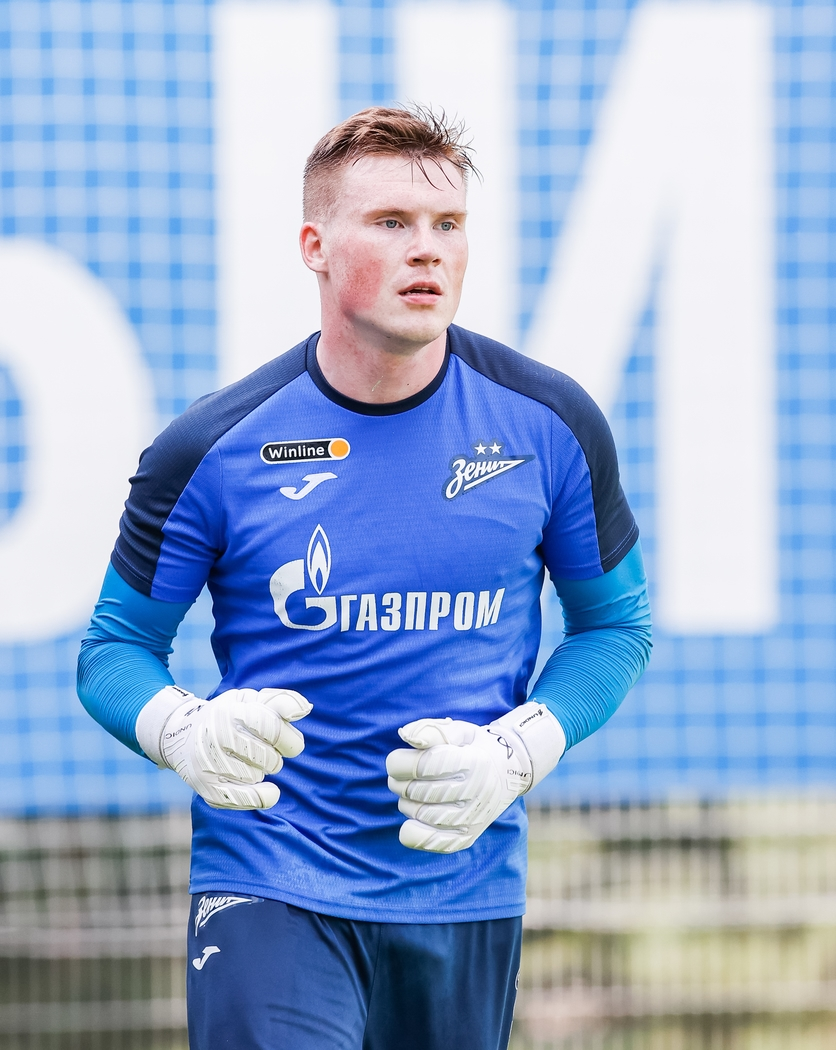

Personal information
- Full name: Nikita Sergeyevich Goylo
- Date of birth: 10 August 1998 (age 28)
- Place of birth: Saint Petersburg, Russia
- Height: 1.88 m (6 ft 2 in)
- Position: Goalkeeper

Team information
- Current team: Vitebsk
- Number: 50

Youth career
- Zenit Saint Petersburg

Senior career*
Years	Team	Apps	(Gls)
2017–	Zenit Saint Petersburg	0	(0)
2018–2019	→ Zenit-2 Saint Petersburg	25	(0)
2020–2021	→ Akron Tolyatti (loan)	18	(0)
2022–2023	→ Pari Nizhny Novgorod (loan)	15	(0)
2023–2024	→ Sochi (loan)	6	(0)
2024	→ Dynamo Makhachkala (loan)	0	(0)
2025	→ Zenit-2 Saint Petersburg	0	(0)
2026–	→ Vitebsk (loan)	8	(0)

International career
2016	Russia U18	3	(0)
2018–2019	Russia U20	1	(0)
- * Club domestic league appearances and goals as of 3 July 2026

Nikita Sergeyevich Goylo (Russian: Никита Сергеевич Гойло; born 10 August 1998) is a Russian football player who plays as a goalkeeper for Vitebsk on loan from Zenit Saint Petersburg.

== Club career ==
He made his debut in the Russian Football National League for Zenit-2 Saint Petersburg on 17 July 2018 in a game against Tambov.

On 4 February 2022, Goylo joined Russian Premier League club Nizhny Novgorod on loan. He made his RPL debut for Nizhny Novgorod on 2 May 2022 against Arsenal Tula and saved a penalty kick on his debut in a 2–2 draw.

On 11 May 2023, Zenit announced that Goylo will return to the club for the 2023–24 season and the contract with him was extended until June 2027.

On 25 July 2023, Goylo joined Sochi on loan until the end of the 2023–24 season.

On 20 August 2024, Goylo moved on a new loan to Dynamo Makhachkala. On 12 January 2025, the loan was terminated early, Goylo was the third goalkeeper and made only two Russian Cup bench appearances for Dynamo Makhachkala during the loan.

== Career statistics ==
As of match played 3 July 2026

Appearances and goals by club, season and competition
Club	Season	League			Cup		Europe		Other		Total	
Club	Season	Division	Apps	Goals	Apps	Goals	Apps	Goals	Apps	Goals	Apps	Goals
Zenit-2 St. Petersburg	2018–19	Russian First League	12	0	–		–		–		12	0
Zenit-2 St. Petersburg	2019–20	Russian Second League	13	0	–		–		–		13	0
Zenit-2 St. Petersburg	Total		25	0	0	0	0	0	0	0	25	0
Akron Tolyatti (loan)	2020–21	Russian First League	13	0	0	0	–		–		13	0
Akron Tolyatti (loan)	2021–22	Russian First League	5	0	0	0	–		–		5	0
Akron Tolyatti (loan)	Total		18	0	0	0	0	0	0	0	18	0
Pari NN (loan)	2021–22	Russian Premier League	4	0	0	0	–		–		4	0
Pari NN (loan)	2022–23	Russian Premier League	11	0	3	0	–		–		14	0
Pari NN (loan)	Total		15	0	3	0	0	0	0	0	18	0
Sochi (loan)	2023–24	Russian Premier League	6	0	4	0	–		–		10	0
Vitebsk (loan)	2026	Belarusian Top League	8	0	0	0	–		–		1	0
Career total			72	0	7	0	0	0	0	0	79	0
