= Yegor Pigayev =

Russian football player

Personal information
- Full name: Yegor Dmitriyevich Pigayev
- Date of birth: 8 June 2002 (age 24)
- Height: 1.87 m (6 ft 2 in)
- Position: Defender

Team information
- Current team: Nosta Novotroitsk
- Number: 31

Senior career*
Years	Team	Apps	(Gls)
2021–2023	Pari NN	0	(0)
2023–2024	SKA-Khabarovsk	0	(0)
2023–2024	SKA-Khabarovsk-2	19	(1)
2025	Dynamo Barnaul	6	(1)
2025–	Nosta Novotroitsk	25	(2)
- * Club domestic league appearances and goals as of 1 November 2026

Yegor Dmitriyevich Pigayev (Russian: Егор Дмитриевич Пигаев; born 8 June 2002) is a Russian football player who plays as a centre-back for Nosta Novotroitsk.

== Club career ==
Pigayev made his debut for the main team of Nizhny Novgorod on 22 September 2021 in a Russian Cup game against Dynamo Barnaul.

== Career statistics ==
As of 21 May 2022

Club	Season	League			Cup		Continental		Total	
Club	Season	Division	Apps	Goals	Apps	Goals	Apps	Goals	Apps	Goals
Nizhny Novgorod	2021–22	RPL	0	0	1	0	–		1	0
Career total			0	0	1	0	0	0	1	0
