= Lucas Masoero =

Argentine footballer

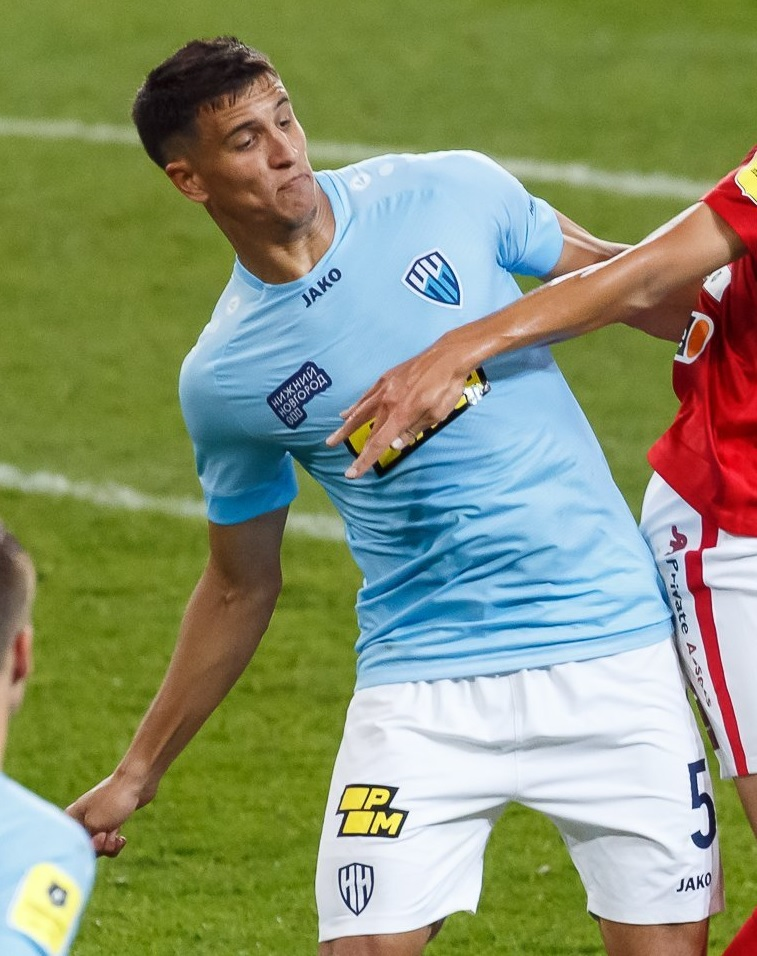
- Masoero with Pari NN in 2021

Personal information
- Full name: Lucas Gabriel Masoero Masi
- Date of birth: 1 February 1995 (age 31)
- Place of birth: Mendoza, Argentina
- Height: 1.88 m (6 ft 2 in)
- Position: Centre-back

Team information
- Current team: Bruk-Bet Termalica
- Number: 5

Youth career
- –2015: Independiente Rivadavia

Senior career*
Years	Team	Apps	(Gls)
2015–2017	Independiente Rivadavia	19	(1)
2017–2018	Deportivo Maipú	26	(4)
2018–2021	Lokomotiv Plovdiv	48	(1)
2021–2023	Pari NN	51	(0)
2023–2025	Universitatea Cluj	63	(6)
2025–	Bruk-Bet Termalica	19	(0)
- * Club domestic league appearances and goals as of 21:47, 25 May 2026 (UTC)

Lucas Gabriel Masoero Masi (born 1 February 1995) is an Argentine professional footballer who plays as a centre-back for I liga club Bruk-Bet Termalica Nieciecza.

== Club career ==
In June 2018, Masoero joined Bulgarian First League club Lokomotiv Plovdiv on a free transfer from Deportivo Maipú. He began his career with Independiente Rivadavia, but left for Deportivo Maipú in 2017.

On 10 July 2021, Masoero signed a two-year contract with Russian Premier League club Nizhny Novgorod. On 18 December 2022, Masoero extended his contract until 2025. He was released from his contract by mutual consent on 31 August 2023.

On 5 September 2023, Masoero signed a two-year contract with Universitatea Cluj in Romania.

On 29 June 2025, Masoero moved to Polish Ekstraklasa club Bruk-Bet Termalica Nieciecza, signing a two-year deal.

== Career statistics ==
As of match played 23 May 2026

Appearances and goals by club, season and competition
Club	Season	League			National cup (Note: Includes Copa Argentina, Bulgarian Cup, Russian Cup, Cupa României)		Continental		Other		Total	
Club	Season	Division	Apps	Goals	Apps	Goals	Apps	Goals	Apps	Goals	Apps	Goals
Independiente Rivadavia	2015	Nacional B	19	1	1	0	—		—		20	1
Independiente Rivadavia	2016	Nacional B	0	0	0	0	—		—		0	0
Independiente Rivadavia	2016–17	Nacional B	0	0	0	0	—		—		0	0
Independiente Rivadavia	Total		19	1	1	0	—		—		20	1
Deportivo Maipú	2017–18	Torneo Federal A	26	4	4	0	—		—		30	4
Lokomotiv Plovdiv	2018–19	Bulgarian First League	8	0	0	0	—		—		8	0
Lokomotiv Plovdiv	2019–20	Bulgarian First League	12	0	5	0	0	0	—		17	0
Lokomotiv Plovdiv	2020–21	Bulgarian First League	28	1	1	0	2 (Note: Appearances in UEFA Europa League)	0	1 (Note: Appearance in Bulgarian Supercup)	0	32	1
Lokomotiv Plovdiv	Total		48	1	6	0	2	0	1	0	57	1
Pari NN	2021–22	Russian Premier League	25	0	2	0	—		—		27	0
Pari NN	2022–23	Russian Premier League	22	0	4	0	—		0	0	26	0
Pari NN	2023–24	Russian Premier League	4	0	1	0	—		—		5	0
Pari NN	Total		51	0	7	0	—		0	0	58	0
Universitatea Cluj	2023–24	Liga I	27	0	3	0	—		2 (Note: Appearance in Liga I European play-offs)	0	32	0
Universitatea Cluj	2024–25	Liga I	36	6	0	0	—		—		36	6
Universitatea Cluj	Total		63	6	3	0	—		2	0	68	6
Bruk-Bet Termalica	2025–26	Ekstraklasa	19	0	0	0	—		—		19	0
Career total			226	12	21	0	2	0	3	0	252	12

== Honours ==
Lokomotiv Plovdiv

- Bulgarian Cup: 2019–20
- Bulgarian Supercup: 2020

Individual

- Liga I Team of the Season: 2024–25
