= Viktor Aleksandrov =

Russian footballer (born 2002)

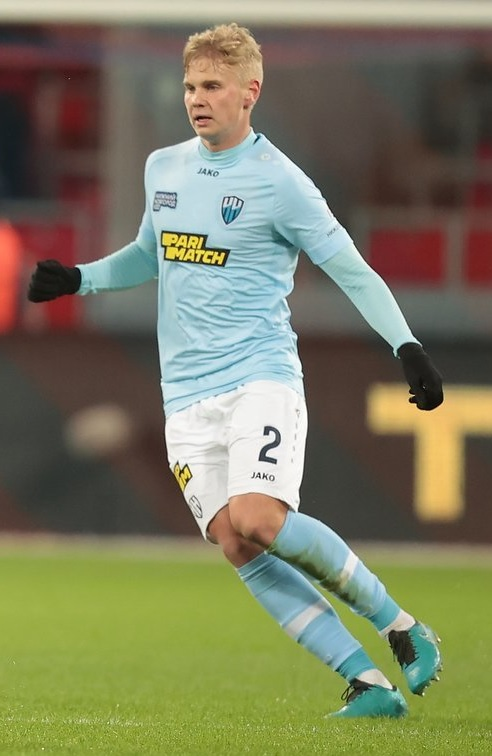
- Aleksandrov with Nizhny Novgorod in 2022

Personal information
- Full name: Viktor Sergeyevich Aleksandrov
- Date of birth: 14 February 2002 (age 24)
- Place of birth: Nizhny Novgorod, Russia
- Height: 1.90 m (6 ft 3 in)
- Position: Centre-back

Team information
- Current team: FC Pari Nizhny Novgorod
- Number: 2

Youth career
- FC Rubin Kazan

Senior career*
Years	Team	Apps	(Gls)
2020–2022	FC Rubin Kazan	0	(0)
2021	→ Valmiera FC (loan)	11	(0)
2022	→ FC Pari Nizhny Novgorod (loan)	12	(1)
2023–	FC Pari Nizhny Novgorod	72	(2)

International career^{‡}
2019	Russia U17	2	(0)
2019	Russia U18	2	(0)
2022	Russia U21	3	(0)
- * Club domestic league appearances and goals as of 11 May 2026 ‡ National team caps and goals as of 16 November 2022

Viktor Sergeyevich Aleksandrov (Russian: Виктор Сергеевич Александров; born 14 February 2002) is a Russian football player who plays as a centre-back for FC Pari Nizhny Novgorod.

== Club career ==
Aleksandrov was raised in the academy of FC Rubin Kazan and was first registered for the club's league squad in the 2018–19 season, and first appeared as a substitute on the matchday squad in November 2020. For the 2021 season, he joined Latvian Higher League side Valmiera FC on loan, and made his senior debut there.

On 15 February 2022, Aleksandrov was loaned to Russian Premier League side FC Nizhny Novgorod from his home town until the end of 2022, with an option to purchase. He made his RPL debut for Nizhny Novgorod on 26 February 2022 in a game against FC Ural Yekaterinburg, as a starter.

On 30 December 2022, Aleksandrov moved to Pari NN (the club was renamed since his original move) on a permanent basis and signed a four-year contract with the club.

== International career ==
Aleksandrov was first called up to the Russia national football team for a training camp in September 2023.

== Career statistics ==
As of match played 11 May 2026

Appearances and goals by club, season and competition
Club	Season	League			Cup		Europe		Other		Total	
Club	Season	Division	Apps	Goals	Apps	Goals	Apps	Goals	Apps	Goals	Apps	Goals
Rubin Kazan	2020–21	Russian Premier League	0	0	0	0	—		0	0	0	0
Valmiera (loan)	2021	Virslīga	11	0	2	0	1 (Note: Appearances in the UEFA Europa Conference League)	0	0	0	14	0
Nizhny Novgorod (loan)	2021–22	Russian Premier League	3	0	1	0	—		—		4	0
Nizhny Novgorod (loan)	2022–23	Russian Premier League	9	1	8	3	—		—		17	4
Nizhny Novgorod (loan)	Total		12	1	9	3	0	0	0	0	21	4
Pari Nizhny Novgorod	2022–23	Russian Premier League	8	1	2	0	—		2 (Note: Appearances in the relegation play-offs)	0	12	1
Pari Nizhny Novgorod	2023–24	Russian Premier League	24	1	5	1	—		2	0	31	2
Pari Nizhny Novgorod	2024–25	Russian Premier League	21	0	4	0	—		2	1	27	1
Pari Nizhny Novgorod	2025–26	Russian Premier League	19	0	6	0	—		—		25	0
Pari Nizhny Novgorod	Total		72	2	17	1	—		6	1	95	4
Career total			95	3	28	4	1	0	6	1	130	8
