= Artur Anisimov =

Russian football goalkeeper

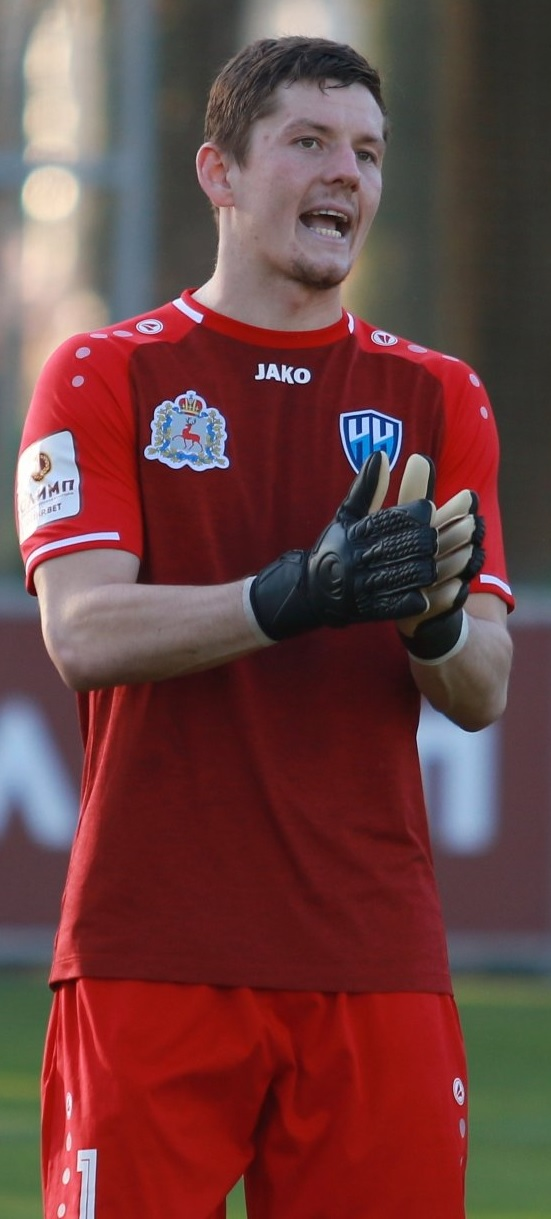
- Anisimov with Nizhny Novgorod in 2019

Personal information
- Full name: Artur Yevgenyevich Anisimov
- Date of birth: 31 December 1992 (age 33)
- Place of birth: Naberezhnye Chelny, Russia
- Height: 1.86 m (6 ft 1 in)
- Position: Goalkeeper

Team information
- Current team: KAMAZ Naberezhnye Chelny
- Number: 31

Youth career
- –2012: KAMAZ Naberezhnye Chelny

Senior career*
Years	Team	Apps	(Gls)
2012–2015	KAMAZ Naberezhnye Chelny	6	(0)
2015–2023	Pari Nizhny Novgorod	138	(0)
2023–	KAMAZ Naberezhnye Chelny	77	(0)
- * Club domestic league appearances and goals as of 16 May 2026

Artur Yevgenyevich Anisimov (Russian: Артур Евгеньевич Анисимов; born 31 December 1992) is a Russian football goalkeeper who plays for KAMAZ Naberezhnye Chelny.

== Club career ==
He made his debut in the Russian Second Division for KAMAZ Naberezhnye Chelny on 8 September 2012 in a game against Tyumen.

He made his Russian Football National League debut for Olimpiyets Nizhny Novgorod on 8 July 2017 in a game against Avangard Kursk.

He made his Russian Premier League debut for Nizhny Novgorod on 17 October 2021 in a game against Krylia Sovetov Samara. Anisimov left the club (by then named Pari Nizhny Novgorod) in June 2023.

== Career statistics ==
As of 16 May 2026

Club	Season	League			Cup		Other		Total	
Club	Season	Division	Apps	Goals	Apps	Goals	Apps	Goals	Apps	Goals
KAMAZ	2012–13	Russian Second League	5	0	1	0	—		6	0
KAMAZ	2013–14	Russian Second League	1	0	0	0	—		1	0
KAMAZ	2014–15	Russian Second League	0	0	0	0	—		0	0
KAMAZ	Total		6	0	1	0	0	0	7	0
Pari Nizhny Novgorod	2015–16	Russian Second League	27	0	0	0	—		27	0
Pari Nizhny Novgorod	2016–17	Russian Second League	17	0	1	0	—		18	0
Pari Nizhny Novgorod	2017–18	Russian First League	21	0	1	0	—		22	0
Pari Nizhny Novgorod	2018–19	Russian First League	29	0	3	0	2 (Note: Appearances in promotion play-offs)	0	34	0
Pari Nizhny Novgorod	2019–20	Russian First League	13	0	3	0	—		16	0
Pari Nizhny Novgorod	2020–21	Russian First League	29	0	3	0	—		32	0
Pari Nizhny Novgorod	2021–22	Russian Premier League	2	0	1	0	—		3	0
Pari Nizhny Novgorod	2022–23	Russian Premier League	0	0	0	0	0	0	0	0
Pari Nizhny Novgorod	Total		138	0	12	0	2	0	152	0
KAMAZ	2023–24	Russian First League	25	0	0	0	—		25	0
KAMAZ	2024–25	Russian First League	26	0	0	0	—		26	0
KAMAZ	2025–26	Russian First League	26	0	0	0	—		26	0
KAMAZ	Total		77	0	0	0	0	0	77	0
Career total			221	0	13	0	2	0	236	0
