= Ilya Berkovsky =

Russian football player

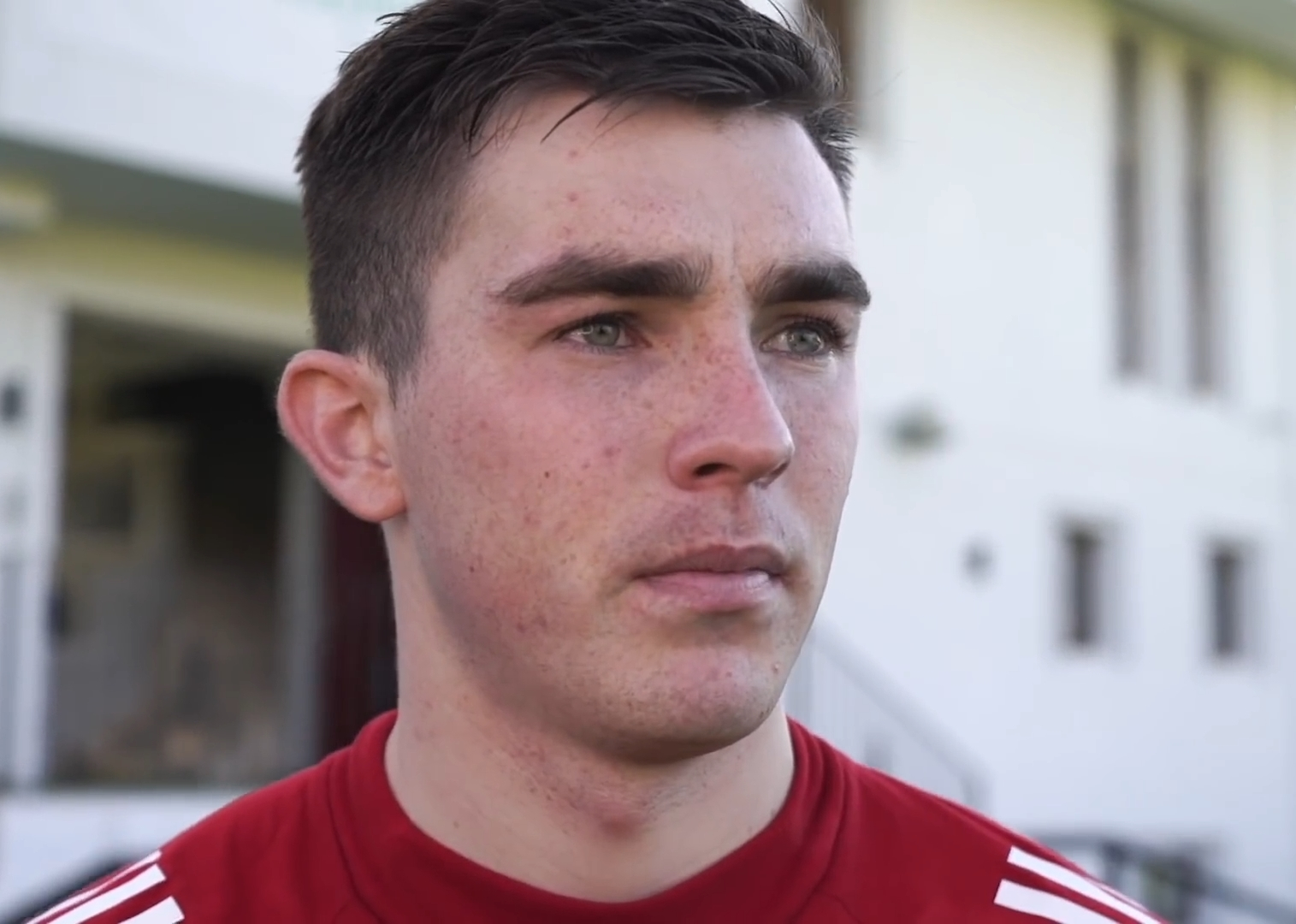
- Berkovsky with Lokomotiv Moscow in 2021

Personal information
- Full name: Ilya Vitalyevich Berkovsky
- Date of birth: 15 March 2000 (age 26)
- Place of birth: Tavricheskoye, Russia
- Height: 1.80 m (5 ft 11 in)
- Position: Midfielder

Team information
- Current team: Torpedo Moscow
- Number: 17

Youth career
- –2016: Irtysh Omsk

Senior career*
Years	Team	Apps	(Gls)
2017–2020	Irtysh Omsk	36	(7)
2020	Torpedo Moscow	21	(6)
2020–2024	Lokomotiv Moscow	0	(0)
2021–2023	→ Pari NN (loan)	28	(1)
2023–2024	→ Khimki (loan)	23	(2)
2024–2025	Khimki	19	(0)
2025–2026	Serikspor	16	(6)
2026–	Torpedo Moscow	11	(3)
- * Club domestic league appearances and goals as of 16 May 2026

Ilya Vitalyevich Berkovsky (Russian: Илья Витальевич Берковский; born 15 March 2000) is a Russian football player who plays as an attacking midfielder for Torpedo Moscow.

== Club career ==
He made his debut in the Russian Professional Football League for Irtysh Omsk on 14 May 2017 in a game against Zenit Irkutsk. He made his Russian Football National League debut for Torpedo Moscow on 2 August 2020 in a game against Shinnik Yaroslavl.

On 18 December 2020, he signed a 3.5-year contract with Russian Premier League club Lokomotiv Moscow. On 15 February 2021, he moved on loan to Nizhny Novgorod until the end of the 2020–21 season. On 19 June 2021, the loan was renewed for the 2021–22 season. He made his Russian Premier League debut for Nizhny Novgorod on 7 August 2021 in a game against Spartak Moscow. On 30 October 2021, he scored his first RPL goal against the club who held his rights, Lokomotiv Moscow. On 17 June 2022, Berkovsky returned to Pari NN (as FC Nizhny Novgorod has been renamed by then) on another season-long loan.

In the 2023–24 season, Berkovsky played on loan at Khimki in the Russian First League. Khimki secured promotion to the Russian Premier League, and an obligation-to-buy clause in the loan contract was triggered. Berkovsky signed a three-year contract with Khimki.

== Career statistics ==
As of match played 24 May 2025

Appearances and goals by club, season and competition
Club	Season	League			Cup		Europe		Total	
Club	Season	Division	Apps	Goals	Apps	Goals	Apps	Goals	Apps	Goals
Irtysh Omsk	2016–17	Russian Second League	1	0	—		—		1	0
Irtysh Omsk	2017–18	Russian Second League	9	3	1	0	—		10	3
Irtysh Omsk	2018–19	Russian Second League	17	2	1	1	—		18	3
Irtysh Omsk	2019–20	Russian Second League	9	2	0	0	—		9	2
Irtysh Omsk	Total		36	7	2	1	—		38	8
Torpedo Moscow	2020–21	Russian First League	21	6	1	0	—		22	6
Pari NN (loan)	2020–21	Russian First League	2	0	—		—		2	0
Pari NN (loan)	2021–22	Russian Premier League	20	1	2	2	—		22	3
Pari NN (loan)	2022–23	Russian Premier League	6	0	5	0	—		11	0
Pari NN (loan)	Total		28	1	7	2	—		35	3
Khimki (loan)	2023–24	Russian First League	23	2	5	0	–		28	2
Khimki	2024–25	Russian Premier League	19	0	5	0	—		24	0
Career total			127	16	20	3	0	0	147	19
