= Maksim Shakhov =

Russian football player

Personal information
- Full name: Maksim Alekseyevich Shakhov
- Date of birth: 11 January 2005 (age 21)
- Height: 1.74 m (5 ft 9 in)
- Position: Central midfielder

Senior career*
Years	Team	Apps	(Gls)
2021–2024	Pari Nizhny Novgorod	0	(0)
2024	Pari NN-2 Nizhny Novgorod	5	(0)
- * Club domestic league appearances and goals as of 19 October 2024

Maksim Alekseyevich Shakhov (Russian: Максим Алексеевич Шахов; born 11 January 2005) is a Russian football player who plays as a central midfielder.

== Club career ==
He made his debut for the main team of Nizhny Novgorod on 22 September 2021 in a Russian Cup game against Dynamo Barnaul.

== Career statistics ==
As of 1 June 2024

Club	Season	League			Cup		Continental		Other		Total	
Club	Season	Division	Apps	Goals	Apps	Goals	Apps	Goals	Apps	Goals	Apps	Goals
Pari Nizhny Novgorod	2021–22	Russian Premier League	0	0	1	0	–		–		1	0
Pari Nizhny Novgorod	2023–24	Russian Premier League	0	0	2	0	–		0	0	2	0
Pari Nizhny Novgorod	Total		0	0	3	0	0	0	0	0	3	0
Pari NN-2 Nizhny Novgorod	2024	Russian Second League B	3	0	–		–		–		3	0
Career total			3	0	3	0	0	0	0	0	6	0
