= Ludwig Franz Alexander Winther =

German pathologist and ophthalmologist (1812–1871)

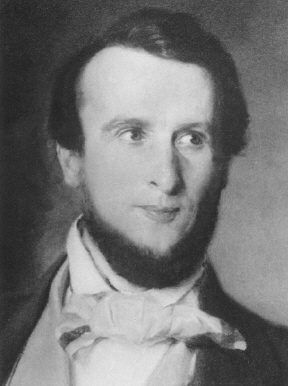
Ludwig Franz Alexander Winther

Ludwig Franz Alexander Winther (9 March 1812 – 26 April 1871) was a German pathologist and ophthalmologist who was a native of Offenbach am Main.

From 1848–1867, he was an associate professor of general pathology and therapy at the University of Giessen, where, from 1867 to 1871, he served as the first full professor of pathological anatomy and therapy. After his death in 1871, his position at Giessen was filled by Theodor Langhans (1839-1915).

In 1847, he was a founding member of the Giessener Sonderbund, a teachers' association at the University of Giessen.

== Selected publications ==
- Untersuchungen über den Bau der Hornhaut und des Flügelfelles (Studies on the construction of the cornea and pterygium), Gießen 1856.
- Zur Gewebelehre der Menschenhornhaut (Lessons on human corneal tissue) in: Virchow's Archiv, 1856, Band X, S. 506f.
- Lehrbuch der Augenheilkunde (Textbook of ophthalmology), Gießen 1856.
- Lehrbuch der allgemeinen pathologischen Anatomie der Gewebe des Menschen (Textbook of general pathological-anatomy on the tissues of humans), Gießen 1860.
- Experimentalstudien über die Pathologie des Flügelfelles (Experimental studies on the pathology of pterygium), 1866.
- Vorträge bei den Versammlungen der Gesellschaft Deutscher Naturforscher und Ärzte (Record of meetings of the Society of German Naturalists and Physicians) 1861, 1864, 1867, 1868; (published in: Schmidt's Jahrbücher, Bd. 114, Bd. 124, Bd. 136, Bd. 140).
