= Nikolai Sysuyev =

Russian footballer

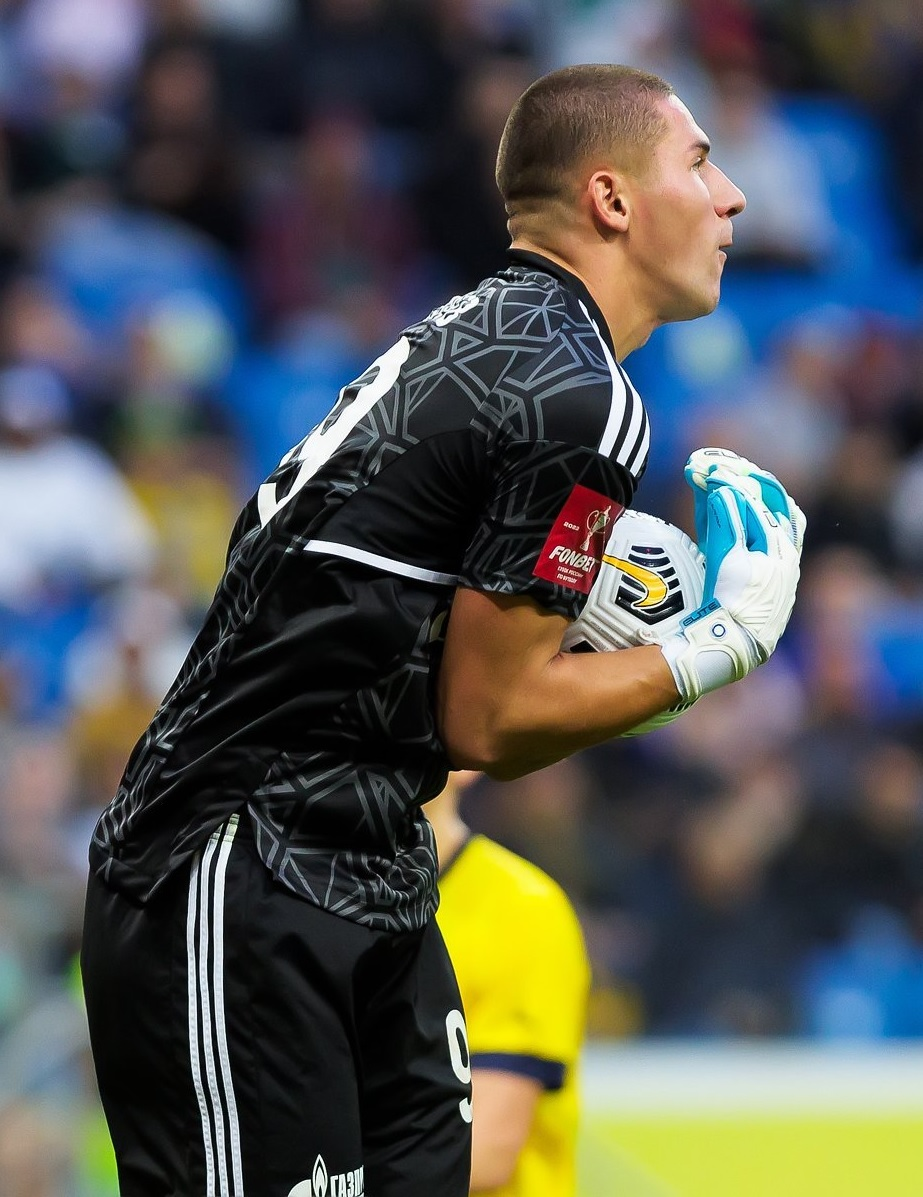
- Sysuyev with Orenburg in 2022

Personal information
- Full name: Nikolai Sergeyevich Sysuyev
- Date of birth: 19 May 1999 (age 27)
- Place of birth: Nizhny Novgorod, Russia
- Height: 1.83 m (6 ft 0 in)
- Position: Goalkeeper

Youth career
- –2015: DYuSSh Nizhny Novgorod
- 2016: Olimpiyets Nizhny Novgorod

Senior career*
Years	Team	Apps	(Gls)
2017–2021	Nizhny Novgorod	35	(0)
2022–2026	Orenburg	51	(0)

International career
2018–2019	Russia U-20	2	(0)
- * Club domestic league appearances and goals as of 24 May 2025

Nikolai Sergeyevich Sysuyev (Russian: Никола́й Серге́евич Сысу́ев; born 19 May 1999) is a Russian football player.

== Club career ==
He made his debut in the Russian Professional Football League for Olimpiyets Nizhny Novgorod on 4 June 2017 in a game against Syzran-2003. He made his Russian Football National League debut for Olimpiyets on 11 April 2018 in a game against Yenisey Krasnoyarsk.

Sysuyev made his Russian Premier League debut for Orenburg on 4 March 2023 in a game against Akhmat Grozny.

He left Orenburg as his contract expired in June 2026.

== Career statistics ==
As of match played 5 November 2025

Appearances and goals by club, season and competition
Club	Season	League			Cup		Total	
Club	Season	Division	Apps	Goals	Apps	Goals	Apps	Goals
Nizhny Novgorod	2016–17	Russian Second League	1	0	0	0	1	0
Nizhny Novgorod	2017–18	Russian First League	7	0	0	0	7	0
Nizhny Novgorod	2018–19	Russian First League	9	0	0	0	9	0
Nizhny Novgorod	2019–20	Russian First League	14	0	0	0	14	0
Nizhny Novgorod	2020–21	Russian First League	4	0	0	0	4	0
Nizhny Novgorod	Total		35	0	0	0	35	0
Orenburg	2021–22	Russian First League	0	0	0	0	0	0
Orenburg	2022–23	Russian Premier League	11	0	2	0	13	0
Orenburg	2023–24	Russian Premier League	26	0	0	0	26	0
Orenburg	2024–25	Russian Premier League	14	0	1	0	15	0
Orenburg	2025–26	Russian Premier League	0	0	6	0	6	0
Orenburg	Total		51	0	9	0	60	0
Career total			86	0	9	0	95	0
