= Andrei Sinitsyn =

Russian footballer

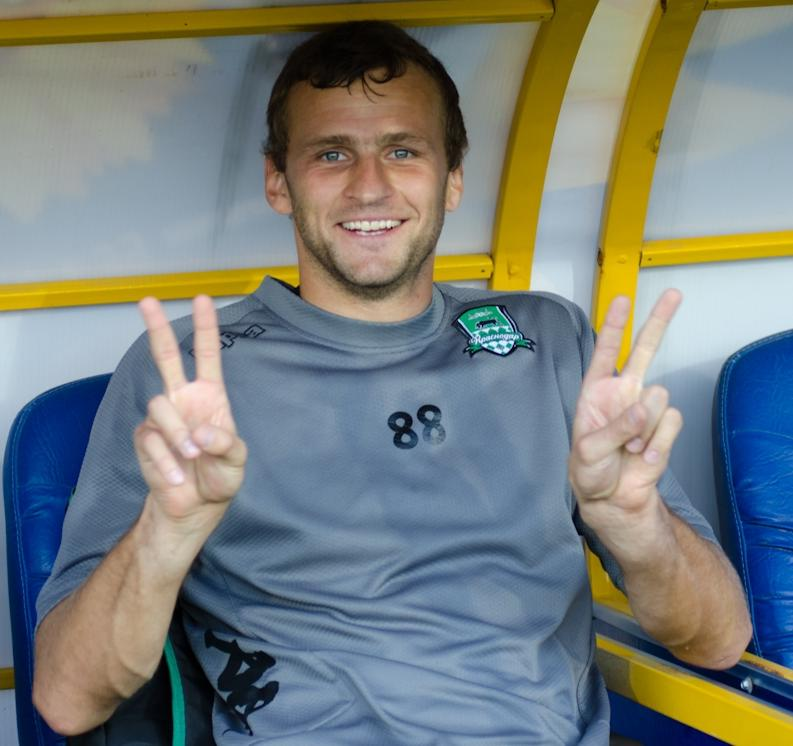
- Sinitsyn with Krasnodar in 2013

Personal information
- Full name: Andrei Alekseyevich Sinitsyn
- Date of birth: 23 June 1988 (age 38)
- Place of birth: Krasnokamensk, Zabaykalsky Krai, Russian SFSR
- Height: 1.96 m (6 ft 5 in)
- Position: Goalkeeper

Team information
- Current team: Kuban Krasnodar (GK coach)

Youth career
- 2003–2004: Chita

Senior career*
Years	Team	Apps	(Gls)
2005–2010	Chita	68	(0)
2011–2012	Yenisey Krasnoyarsk	33	(0)
2012–2020	Krasnodar	77	(0)
2021	Akron Tolyatti	0	(0)
2021	Nizhny Novgorod	1	(0)
2022	Dynamo Makhachkala	1	(0)

Managerial career
- 2024–: Kuban Krasnodar (GK coach)
- * Club domestic league appearances and goals

Andrei Alekseyevich Sinitsyn (Russian: Андрей Алексеевич Синицын; born 23 June 1988) is a Russian professional football coach and a former player who played as a goalkeeper. He is the goalkeeping coach with Kuban Krasnodar.

== Career ==
On 20 June 2014, Sinitsyn signed a two-year contract extension with Krasnodar, taking him up to the summer of 2017.

On 25 August 2021, he joined Nizhny Novgorod.

=== Career statistics ===
As of 13 May 2018

Club	Season	League			Cup		Continental		Total	
Club	Season	Division	Apps	Goals	Apps	Goals	Apps	Goals	Apps	Goals
FC Chita	2005	FNL	1	0	0	0	–		1	0
FC Chita	2006	PFL	6	0	3	0	–		9	0
FC Chita	2007	PFL	14	0	0	0	–		14	0
FC Chita	2008	PFL	25	0	0	0	–		25	0
FC Chita	2009	FNL	14	0	1	0	–		15	0
FC Chita	2010	PFL	29	0	0	0	–		29	0
FC Chita	Total		89	0	4	0	0	0	93	0
FC Yenisey Krasnoyarsk	2011–12	FNL	33	0	2	0	–		35	0
FC Krasnodar	2012–13	Russian Premier League	15	0	1	0	–		16	0
FC Krasnodar	2013–14	Russian Premier League	10	0	5	0	–		15	0
FC Krasnodar	2014–15	Russian Premier League	6	0	2	0	4	0	12	0
FC Krasnodar	2015–16	Russian Premier League	4	0	1	0	1	0	6	0
FC Krasnodar	2016–17	Russian Premier League	12	0	2	0	4	0	18	0
FC Krasnodar	2017–18	Russian Premier League	25	0	0	0	4	0	29	0
FC Krasnodar	Total		72	0	11	0	13	0	96	0
Career total			194	0	17	0	13	0	224	0

== Honours ==
- Russian Second Division, Zone East best goalkeeper: 2010.
