= Matvey Fyodorov =

Russian footballer (born 2008)

Personal information
- Full name: Matvey Aleksandrovich Fyodorov
- Date of birth: 19 August 2008 (age 18)
- Place of birth: Nizhny Novgorod, Russia
- Height: 1.83 m (6 ft 0 in)
- Position: Centre-forward

Team information
- Current team: Pari Nizhny Novgorod
- Number: 75

Youth career
- –2019: Nizhny Novgorod
- 2020: Lokomotiv Moscow
- 2020: SShOR № 8 Nizhny Novgorod
- 2021–2023: Dynamo Moscow
- 2024–2025: Pari Nizhny Novgorod

Senior career*
Years	Team	Apps	(Gls)
2025–	Pari Nizhny Novgorod	1	(0)
- * Club domestic league appearances and goals as of 23 August 2025

Matvey Aleksandrovich Fyodorov (Russian: Матвей Александрович Фёдоров; born 19 August 2008) is a Russian football player who plays as a centre-forward for Pari Nizhny Novgorod.

== Career ==
Fyodorov made his debut in the Russian Premier League for Pari Nizhny Novgorod on 23 August 2025 in a game against Dynamo Moscow.

== Career statistics ==
As of 1 June 2024

Club	Season	League			Cup		Total	
Club	Season	Division	Apps	Goals	Apps	Goals	Apps	Goals
Pari Nizhny Novgorod	2025–26	Russian Premier League	1	0	0	0	1	0
Career total			1	0	0	0	1	0
