= Konstantin Galkin =

Russian professional football coach (born 1961)

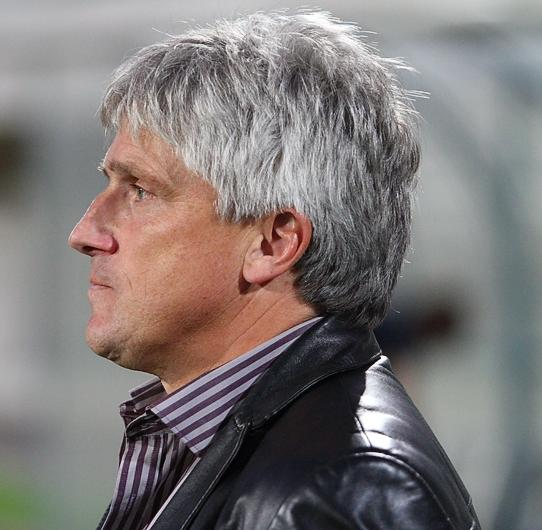
- Galkin with Gazovik Orenburg in 2011

Personal information
- Full name: Konstantin Severyanovich Galkin
- Date of birth: 28 May 1961 (age 65)
- Place of birth: Gorky, now Nizhny Novgorod, Russian SFSR

Team information
- Current team: Shinnik Yaroslavl (assistant coach)

Senior career*
Years	Team	Apps	(Gls)
1983–1987	Radiy Gorky		
1990–1991	Avtomobilist Yakutsk		

Managerial career
- 1992–1994: Dynamo Yakutsk (director)
- 1996–2002: Zarya Yakutsk
- 2003–2006: Alnas Almetyevsk
- 2007–2009: Chelyabinsk
- 2009–2011: Gazovik Orenburg
- 2012: Volga Nizhny Novgorod (assistant)
- 2012–2013: Volga Ulyanovsk
- 2013–2015: Tyumen
- 2015–2016: Nosta Novotroitsk
- 2016–2017: Olimpiyets Nizhny Novgorod
- 2017: Kolkheti-1913 Poti
- 2018–2021: Nizhny Novgorod (assistant)
- 2021–2022: Nosta Novotroitsk (assistant)
- 2022: Mashuk-KMV Pyatigorsk
- 2023: FC Santa Coloma (assistant)
- 2024–: Shinnik Yaroslavl (assistant)
- * Club domestic league appearances and goals

Konstantin Severyanovich Galkin (Russian: Константин Северьянович Галкин; born 28 May 1961) is a Russian professional football coach and a former player who is an assistant coach with Shinnik Yaroslavl.

== Honours ==
- Russian Second Division, Zone Ural-Povolzhye best coach: 2010.
