= Theodor Langhans =

German pathologist

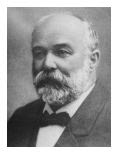
Theodor Langhans

Theodor Langhans (28 September 1839 in Usingen – 22 October 1915 in Bern) was a German pathologist who was a native of Usingen, Duchy of Nassau.

He studied medicine at the University of Heidelberg, and at the University of Göttingen under Friedrich Gustav Jakob Henle (1809–1885), at Berlin under Rudolf Virchow (1821–1902) and in Würzburg, where he became an assistant to Friedrich Daniel von Recklinghausen (1833–1910). In 1867 he became a lecturer at the University of Marburg, and in 1872 became a full professor of pathology at the University of Giessen, where he succeeded Ludwig Franz Alexander Winther (1812–1871).

From 1872 until 1912, Langhans was a professor of pathological anatomy at the University of Bern, where one of his assistants was surgeon Fritz de Quervain (1868–1940). He also worked with Serafima Schachova on kidney anatomy research using a canine model of induced nephritis.

Langhans is remembered for his discovery of multi-nucleated giant cells that are found in granulomatous conditions, and are now referred to as Langhans giant cells.
