= Serafima Schachova =

Russian/Ukrainian physician

Seraphima Schachova (Russian: Серафима Шахова, romanized: Serafima Shakhova), also known as Serafina Schachova or Seraphima Schachowa (1854-unknown) was a Russian physician known for her discovery of the spiral tubes of Schachova, part of the kidney's duct system, a segment of the nephron between the proximal convoluted tubule and the loop of Henle.

She grew up in Ekaterinoslav, modern-day Ukraine, in a somewhat well-off family and an area rife with class tensions. She studied medicine at the University of Zurich from 1871 to 1873 (leaving the university with "Generalzeugnis" ("general certificate")) While there, she researched the development of bone structure and tissue using a pigeon model. Schachova's time in Zurich ended abruptly when the Russian government required women to leave the city. She transferred to the University of Bern and worked with Theodor Langhans on kidney anatomy research using a canine model of induced nephritis. In Bern she completed her dissertation in medicine Untersuchungen über die Nieren (1876) (advised by Langhans). Schachova returned to Russia in 1877 and practiced medicine in that country until 1910, when she moved to Kharkhov, Ukraine. The details of the end of her life are unknown.
