= Tavrichesky District =

Tavrichesky District Таврический район (Russian)
- District
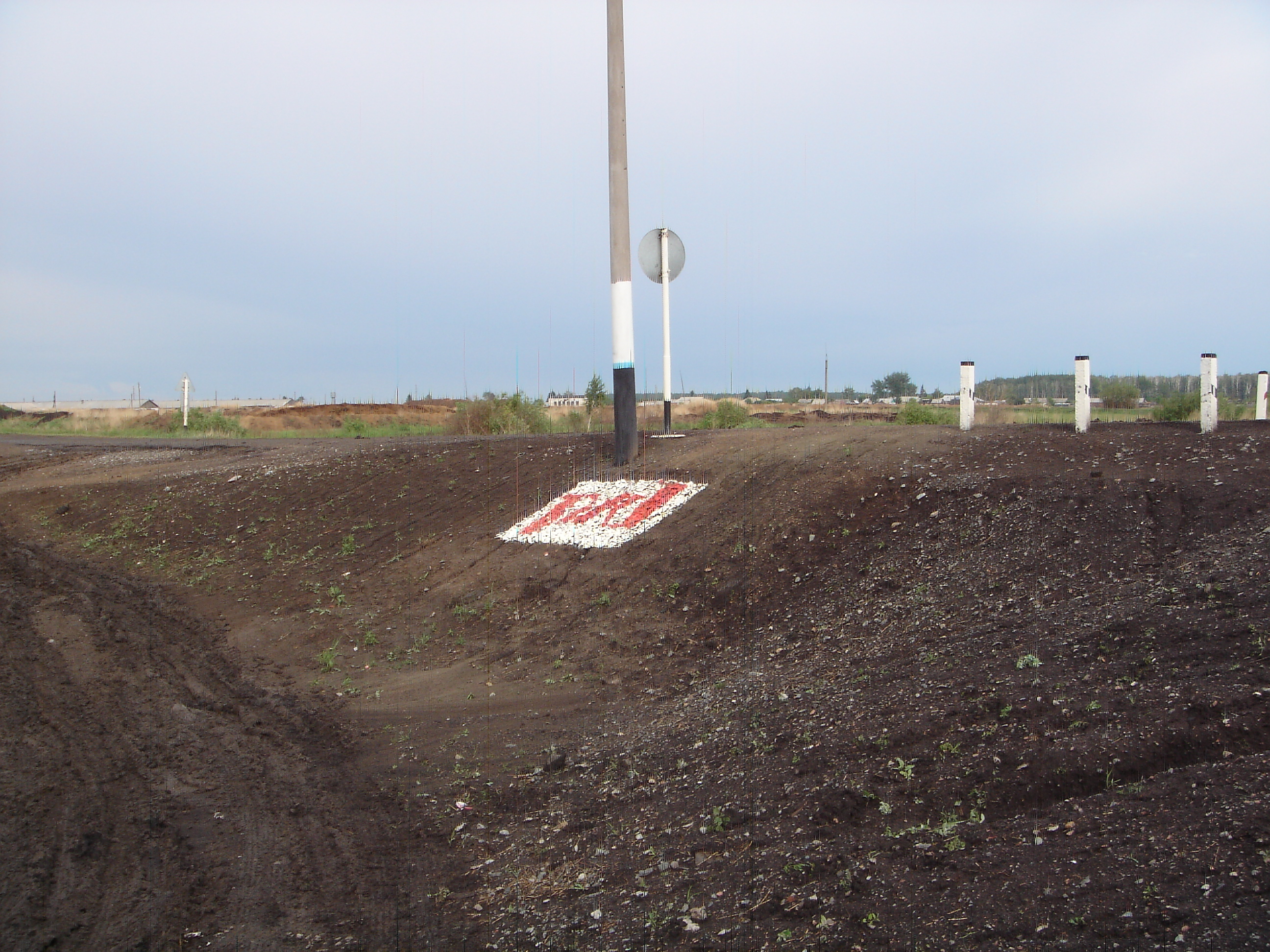
- Road crossing in Tavrichesky District

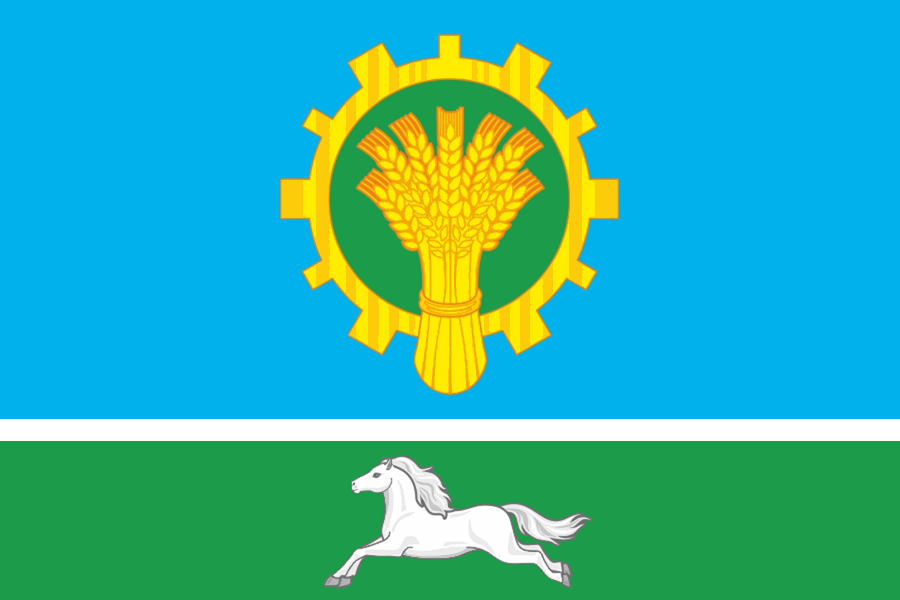
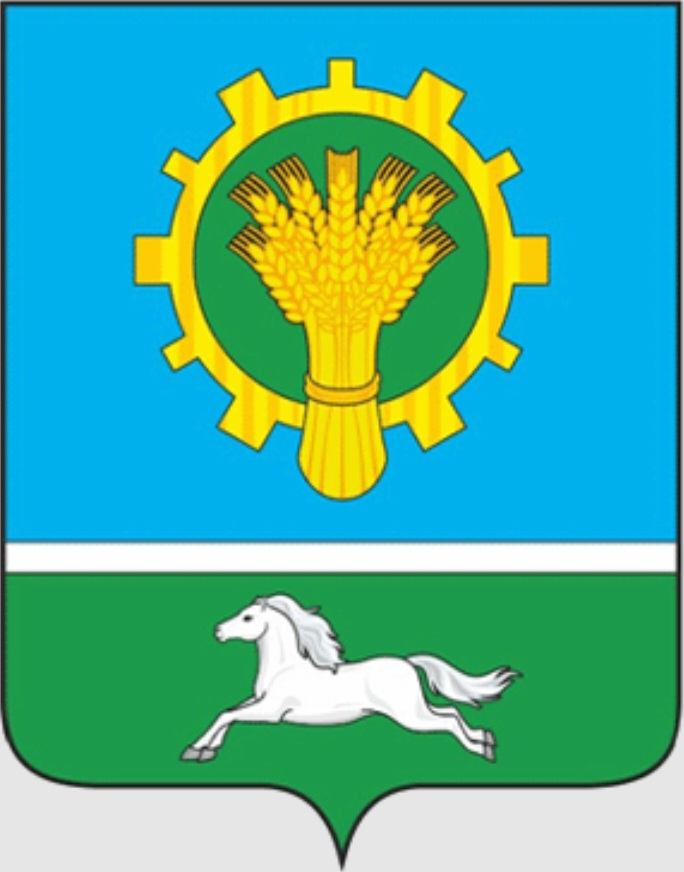
- Flag Coat of arms
- Location of Tavrichesky District in Omsk Oblast
- Coordinates: 54°35′N 73°38′E
- Country: Russia
- Federal subject: Omsk Oblast
- Established: 1935
- Administrative center: Tavricheskoye

Area
  - Total: 2,800 km^{2} (1,100 sq mi)

Population (2010 Census)
  - Total: 36,458
  - Density: 13/km^{2} (34/sq mi)
  - Urban: 36.0%
  - Rural: 64.0%

Administrative structure
  - Administrative divisions: 1 Work settlements, 10 Rural okrugs
  - Inhabited localities: 1 urban-type settlements, 42 rural localities

Municipal structure
  - Municipally incorporated as: Tavrichesky Municipal District
  - Municipal divisions: 1 urban settlements, 10 rural settlements
- Time zone: UTC+6 (MSK+3)
- OKTMO ID: 52653000
- Website: http://www.tavrich.omskportal.ru/

Tavrichesky District (Russian: Таври́ческий райо́н) is an administrative and municipal district (raion), one of the thirty-two in Omsk Oblast, Russia. It is located in the south of the oblast. The area of the district is 2,800 square kilometers (1,100 sq mi). Its administrative center is the urban locality (a work settlement) of Tavricheskoye. Population: 36,458 (2010 Census); 38,840 (2002 census); 47,751 (1989 Soviet census). The population of Tavricheskoye accounts for 36.0% of the district's total population.

== Notable residents ==
- Ilya Berkovski (born 2000), football player, born in Tavricheskoye
- Ivan Yagan (1934–2022), writer, born in Baydakovka
