= Baydakovka =

Baydakovka Байдаковка
- Selo
- Location within Bashkortostan Location within Russia
- Coordinates: 53°56′N 55°21′E
- Country: Russia
- Region: Bashkortostan
- District: Alsheyevsky District
- Time zone: UTC+5:00

Baydakovka (Russian: Байдаковка) is a rural locality (a selo) in Nigmatullinsky Selsoviet, Alsheyevsky District, Bashkortostan, Russia. The population was 218 as of 2010. There are 3 streets.

== Geography ==
Baydakovka is located 43 km southeast of Rayevsky (the district's administrative centre) by road. Belyakovka is the nearest rural locality.
