= Tavricheskoye, Omsk Oblast =

Tavricheskoye Таврическое
- Urban-type settlement
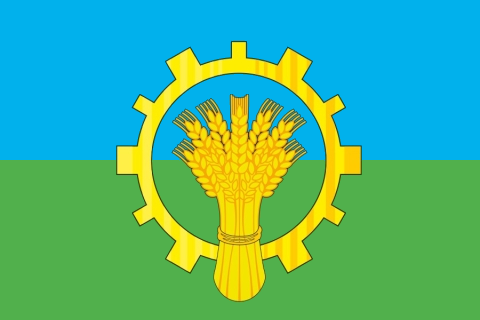
- Flag
- Interactive map of Tavricheskoye
- Location of Tavricheskoye Tavricheskoye (Omsk Oblast)
- Coordinates: 54°35′4″N 73°38′17″E
- Country: Russia
- Federal subject: Omsk Oblast
- Administrative district: Tavrichesky District
- Founded: 1900
- Elevation: 93 m (305 ft)

Population (2010 Census)
  - Total: 13,141
  - Estimate (2025): 11,485 (−12.6%)
- Time zone: UTC+6 (MSK+3)
- Postal code: 646800
- OKTMO ID: 52653151051

Tavricheskoye (Russian: Таврическое) is an urban locality (a work settlement) and the administrative center of the Tavrichesky District in Omsk Oblast, Russia. Population: 13,141 (2010 census); 13,222 (2002 census);
