= 2024–25 FC Pari Nizhny Novgorod season =

FC Pari Nizhny Novgorod
2024–25 season
- Manager: Saša Ilić
- Stadium: Nizhny Novgorod Stadium
- Russian Premier League: 15th
- Russian Cup: Group stage
- All statistics correct as of 27 July 2024.

The 2024–25 season is the 10th season in the history of FC Pari Nizhny Novgorod, and the club's fourth consecutive season in Russian Premier League. In addition to the domestic league, the team is scheduled to participate in the Russian Cup.

== Transfers ==
=== In ===
Pos.	Player	Transferred from	Fee	Date	Source
MF	(Russia) Nikita Ermakov	(Russia) CSKA Moscow		1 July 2024	
FW	(Serbia) Ognjen Ožegović	(Greece) A.E. Kifisia	Undisclosed	4 July 2024	
MF	(Slovenia) Luka Vešner Tičić	(Slovenia) FC Koper	Undisclosed	8 July 2024	
MF	(Israel) Dan Glazer	(Greece) OFI		9 July 2024	

=== Out ===
Pos.	Player	Transferred to	Fee	Date	Source
GK	(Russia) Artur Nigmatullin	(Russia) Rubin Kazan		1 July 2024	
FW	(Russia) Timur Suleymanov	(Russia) Lokomotiv Moscow	End of contract	1 July 2024	
MF	(Russia) Konstantin Kuchayev	(Russia) Rostov	End of contract	1 July 2024	

== Friendlies ==
=== Pre-season ===
26 June 2024 Friendly	Pari Nizhny Novgorod (Russia)	0–4	(Russia) Yenisey Krasnoyarsk
15:00 UTC+3			Lomakin 17', 24'; Savelyev 28'; Chukanov 41'

30 June 2024 Friendly	Pari Nizhny Novgorod (Russia)	2–1	(Serbia) Sloboda Užice
17:00 UTC+3	[[]] 50'; [[]] 64'; [[]] (red card) 74'		[[]] 78'

4 July 2024 Friendly	Pari Nizhny Novgorod (Russia)	1–0	(Montenegro) FK Arsenal Tivat
17:00 UTC+3	Zé Turbo 55'

7 July 2024 Friendly	Novi Pazar (Serbia)	0–1	(Russia) Pari Nizhny Novgorod
19:00 UTC+3			Magkeev 25'

12 July 2024 Friendly	OFK Petrovac (Montenegro)	0–3	(Russia) Pari Nizhny Novgorod

== Competitions ==
=== Overall record ===
Competition	First match	Last match	Starting round	Record							
Competition	First match	Last match	Starting round	Pld	W	D	L	GF	GA	GD	Win %
Russian Premier League	19–22 July 2024	24 May 2025	Matchday 1	0	0	0	0	0	0	+0	—
Russian Cup	30 July–1 August 2024			0	0	0	0	0	0	+0	—
Total				0	0	0	0	0	0	+0	—

Source: Soccerway

=== Russian Premier League ===
==== League table ====
Pos	Team	Pld	W	D	L	GF	GA	GD	Pts	Qualification or relegation
11	Dynamo Makhachkala	30	6	11	13	27	35	−8	29 (Note: Dynamo Makhachkala 4–1 Khimki, Khimki 1–1 Dynamo Makhachkala)	
12	Khimki (D, R)	30	6	11	13	35	56	−21	29	Administratively relegated, then dissolved. (Note: Khimki were not issued the 2025–26 RPL license and were administratively relegated. They were replaced by Pari Nizhny Novgorod. Khimki were then dissolved.)
13	Pari Nizhny Novgorod (X)	30	7	6	17	27	54	−27	27	Qualification to relegation play-offs
14	Akhmat Grozny (O)	30	4	13	13	27	48	−21	25	Qualification to relegation play-offs
15	Orenburg (Note: Orenburg was originally relegated, then returned to Russian Premier League on 11 July 2025 to replace Torpedo Moscow which was originally promoted and then removed from the league for attempted match-fixing in the previous season.)	30	4	7	19	28	56	−28	19	

Source: Premier Liga
Rules for classification: 1) Points; 2) Head-to-head points; 3) Head-to-head matches won; 4) Head-to-head goal difference; 5) Head-to-head goals scored; 6) Matches won; 7) Goal difference; 8) Goals scored; 9) 2023–24 position (not applicable to final standings); 10) Play-off. Note: if teams tied on points did not play an equal number of head-to-head games, head-to-head results are not considered for the standings.
(D) Disqualified; (O) Play-off winners; (R) Relegated; (X) Lost in the play-offs, reprieved from relegation after Khimki was administratively relegated.

==== Results summary ====
Overall								Home						Away					
Pld	W	D	L	GF	GA	GD	Pts	W	D	L	GF	GA	GD	W	D	L	GF	GA	GD
2	0	0	2	2	7	−5	0	0	0	1	2	4	−2	0	0	1	0	3	−3

Last updated: 27 July 2024.

==== Results by round ====
Round	1	2	3
Ground	H	H	A
Result	L	L	
Position	15	15	

Updated to match(es) played on 27 July 2024. Source:
A = Away; H = Home; W = Win; D = Draw; L = Loss

==== Matches ====
The match schedule was released on 20 June 2024.

22 July 2024 1	Pari Nizhny Novgorod	v	Rubin Kazan

=== Russian Cup ===
==== Group stage ====
Pari Nizhny Novgorod	v	CSKA Moscow	Nizhny Novgorod
			Stadium: Nizhny Novgorod Stadium

Pari Nizhny Novgorod	v	Krasnodar	Nizhny Novgorod
			Stadium: Nizhny Novgorod Stadium

Pari Nizhny Novgorod	v	Akhmat Grozny	Nizhny Novgorod
			Stadium: Nizhny Novgorod Stadium

CSKA Moscow	v	Pari Nizhny Novgorod	Moscow

Krasnodar	v	Pari Nizhny Novgorod	Krasnodar

Akhmat Grozny	v	Pari Nizhny Novgorod	Grozny
