= FC Nizhny Novgorod =

Association football club in Russia

Nizhny Novgorod
- Full name: Football Club Nizhny Novgorod
- Founded: 2015; 11 years ago
- Ground: Nizhny Novgorod Stadium
- Capacity: 44,899
- Owner: City of Nizhny Novgorod
- General director: David Melik-Guseynov
- Manager: Vadim Garanin
- League: Russian First League
- 2025–26: Russian Premier League, 15th of 16 (relegated)
- Website: fcnn.ru
Home colours	Away colours

FC Nizhny Novgorod (Russian: ФК «Нижний Новгород»), also known as simply Nizhny Novgorod, is a Russian professional football club from Nizhny Novgorod, founded in 2015. It returned to the second-tier Russian First League for the 2026–27 season after 5 years in the Russian Premier League.

== History ==
The club has been known under different names:

- 2015–2016: FC Volga-Olimpiyets Nizhny Novgorod
- 2016–2018: FC Olimpiyets Nizhny Novgorod
- 2018–2022: FC Nizhny Novgorod
- 2022–2026: FC Pari Nizhny Novgorod
- 2026– : FC Nizhny Novgorod

In the 2015–16 season, it began to play in the third-tier Russian Professional Football League. It was founded as a farm club for FC Volga Nizhny Novgorod. On 15 June 2016, the parent club Volga was dissolved, with Olimpiyets becoming the top club in Nizhny Novgorod. At the end of the 2016–17, Olimpiyets won their PFL zone and were promoted to the second-level Russian Football National League. At the end of the 2018–19 season, they qualified for the Russian Premier League promotion play-offs, but lost to PFC Krylia Sovetov Samara with an aggregate score of 2–3.

In the 2020–21 season, the club finished 3rd in FNL. As the second-placed club FC Orenburg failed to receive a Premier League license due to issues with their stadium, Nizhny Novgorod was promoted to the RPL for the first time for the 2021–22 season.

Former Nigeria striker Sylvester Igboun suspended his contract with the team because of the Russian invasion of Ukraine.

On 10 June 2022, the club announced that the name of the club will be changed to FC Pari Nizhny Novgorod (or Pari NN for short) due to a sponsorship deal with a bookmaker Pari, previously known as Paribet. The name change was approved by the Russian Football Union on the same day. Pari NN finished the 2022–23 season in 14th place, qualifying for relegation play-offs against FC Rodina Moscow. After winning the first leg of the play-offs away with the score of 3–0, Pari lost 0–2 at home and won 3–2 on aggregate, retaining their Premier League spot.

In the 2023–24 season, Pari NN finished 14th once again, qualifying for the relegation play-offs. Pari defeated Arsenal Tula with the aggregate score of 3–2 and remained in the Premier League.

On 26 December 2024, four players of Pari's Under-19 squad have been punished by the Russian Football Union for match fixing games of the Under-19 Russian Championship. Nikita Milyukov has been banned from football for life, Zakhar Mozin, Maksim Galochkin and Pavel Shalimov were banned for one year (with an additional four years suspended sentence and a two years probation), and Denis Chuprunov received a three-year suspended sentence ban with a two-year probation. None of the club management or staff were punished.

In the 2024–25 season, Pari finished 13th and qualified for relegation play-offs. However, as 12th-placed Khimki was denied the 2025–26 RPL license, Pari was not expected be relegated even if they lost in the play-offs, as they would be the priority replacement for Khimki in that case. Pari lost to Sochi in the playoffs with an aggregate score of 3–4. On 16 June 2025, Russian Football Union confirmed that Pari will remain in the Premier League.

On 17 May 2026, Pari NN was relegated back to Russian First League after five seasons in the top level.

Edgardo Fariña was selected to represent Panama at the 2026 FIFA World Cup.

The club was renamed back to FC Nizhny Novgorod in July 2026.

=== League ===
Season	League										Russian Cup	Europe	Top goalscorer		Manager
Season	Div.	Pos.	Pl.	W	D	L	GF	GA	GD	P	Russian Cup	Europe	Name	Goals	Manager
2015–16	3rd	3rd	27	15	8	4	38	19	19	53	2R	—	(Russia) Igor Belyakov	11	(Russia) Valeri Bogdanets (Russia) Konstantin Galkin
2016–17	3rd	1st	24	17	4	3	47	17	30	55	2R	—	(Russia) Igor Gorbunov	10	(Russia) Konstantin Galkin (Russia) Nikolai Pisarev
2017–18	2nd	12th	38	11	11	16	37	50	-13	55	R16	—	(Russia) Radik Khayrullov	9	(Russia) Nikolai Pisarev
2018–19	2nd	4th	38	18	8	12	41	31	+10	62	R16	—	(Russia) Maksim Paliyenko	9	(Russia) Dmitri Cheryshev
2019–20	2nd	11th	27	9	9	9	28	29	-1	36	R16	—	(Russia) Maksim Paliyenko (Russia) Pavel Ignatovich (Russia) Igor Portnyagin	5	(Russia) Dmitri Cheryshev (Russia) Robert Yevdokimov
2020–21	2nd	3rd	42	27	7	8	67	28	+39	88	R16	—	(Russia) Timur Suleymanov	9	(Russia) Robert Yevdokimov
2021–22	1st	11th	30	8	9	13	26	39	-13	33	R16	—	(Russia) Nikolay Kalinsky	8	(Russia) Aleksandr Kerzhakov

== Players ==
=== Current squad ===
As of 11 September 2026, according to the First League website.

Note: Flags indicate national team as defined under FIFA eligibility rules; some limited exceptions apply. Players may hold more than one non-FIFA nationality.

No.	Pos.	Nation	Player
2	DF	RUS	Viktor Aleksandrov
3	DF	RUS	Yury Koledin
4	DF	RUS	Roman Yevgenyev
7	MF	RUS	Ivan Bobyor
8	MF	MLI	Mamadou Maiga
9	FW	RUS	Vladislav Sarveli
11	MF	RUS	Gleb Popolitov (on loan from CSKA Moscow)
15	DF	RUS	Aleksandr Ektov
17	DF	RUS	Gleb Shilnikov
18	MF	RUS	Artyom Sokolov
19	MF	RUS	Nikita Yermakov
22	DF	RUS	Nikita Kakkoyev
24	DF	PAN	Edgardo Fariña
25	DF	SLO	Sven Karič

No.	Pos.	Nation	Player
27	FW	RUS	Vyacheslav Grulyov
30	GK	RUS	Nikita Medvedev
32	DF	BLR	Vadim Pigas
66	DF	RUS	Yan Gudkov
72	FW	RUS	Timofey Komissarov
77	MF	RUS	Andrey Ivlev
78	MF	RUS	Nikolay Kalinsky
80	MF	RUS	Valeri Tsarukyan
81	GK	RUS	Nikita Generalov
91	FW	RUS	Vladimir Ignatenko
93	FW	RUS	Stanislav Lapinsky
94	MF	RUS	Artyom Timofeyev
98	GK	RUS	Islam Imamov

=== Other players under contract ===
Note: Flags indicate national team as defined under FIFA eligibility rules; some limited exceptions apply. Players may hold more than one non-FIFA nationality.

No.	Pos.	Nation	Player
—	FW	RUS	Matvey Fyodorov

=== Out on loan ===
Note: Flags indicate national team as defined under FIFA eligibility rules; some limited exceptions apply. Players may hold more than one non-FIFA nationality.

No.	Pos.	Nation	Player
—	GK	RUS	Semyon Fadeyev (at Tekstilshchik Ivanovo until 30 June 2027)
—	GK	RUS	Yevgeni Latyshonok (at Baltika Kaliningrad until 30 June 2027)
—	DF	RUS	Artyom Chistyakov (at Tver until 31 December 2026)
—	DF	RUS	Yaroslav Krashevsky (at Arsenal Tula until 30 June 2027)
—	DF	RUS	Artyom Krutovskikh (at Tekstilshchik Ivanovo until 30 June 2027)
—	DF	RUS	Yevgeny Lukinykh (at Kaluga until 31 December 2026)
—	MF	GEO	Vakho Bedoshvili (at Iberia 1999 until 31 December 2026)
—	MF	RUS	Ramil Gaynullin (at Chertanovo Moscow until 31 December 2026)

No.	Pos.	Nation	Player
—	MF	RUS	Vladislav Karapuzov (at Ural Yekaterinburg until 30 June 2027)
—	MF	RUS	Yegor Kavtrev (at Chertanovo Moscow until 31 December 2026)
—	MF	RUS	Daniil Lesovoy (at Dynamo Makhachkala until 30 June 2027)
—	MF	RUS	Georgy Safronov (at Chertanovo Moscow until 31 December 2026)
—	FW	URU	Adrián Balboa (at Banfield until 30 June 2027)
—	FW	RUS	Nikolay Ishchenko (at Tekstilshchik Ivanovo until 30 June 2027)
—	FW	RUS	Matvey Urvantsev (at Chelyabinsk until 30 June 2027)

== Honours ==
- Russian Third Division
  - Champions (1): 2016–17

== Club officials ==
As of 16 June 2022

Position	Staff
Chairman	(Russia) Ravil Izmaylov
Director of Football	(Russia) Igor Kudryashov
Manager	(Russia) Artyom Gorlov
Assistant managers	(Russia) Leonid Ablizin
First-team coach	(Russia) Oleg Levin
Senior Goalkeeper Coach	(Russia) Valeriy Kleimenov
Fitness coach	(Russia) Dmitriy Polyanin (Russia) Kirill Zhinkin
Chief analyst	(Russia) Vladimir Savchenko
Video analyst	(Russia) Andrey Ankudimov
Scout	(Russia) Pavel Naboyshchikov
Head of Medical	(Russia) Oleg Vinokurov
Doctor	(Russia) Sergey Vjalitsyn
Masseur	(Russia) Vyacheslav Vishnevskiy
Team Organiser	(Russia) Aleksandr Trishin
