= 2024–25 FC Zenit Saint Petersburg season =

FC Zenit Saint Petersburg
2024–25 season
- Chairman: Alexander Medvedev
- Manager: Sergei Semak
- Stadium: Krestovsky Stadium
- Premier League: 2nd
- Russian Cup: RPL path final
- Super Cup: Winners
- Top goalscorer: League: Luciano Gondou (10); All: Mateo Cassierra (12)
- Highest home attendance: 57,101 vs Krasnodar (13 April 2025)
- Lowest home attendance: 20,570 vs Akhmat Grozny (6 November 2024)
- Average home league attendance: 35,691 (24 May 2025)
Home colours	Away colours

The 2024–25 season was the 100th season in the history of FC Zenit Saint Petersburg, and the club's 33rd consecutive season in the Russian top division. In addition to the domestic league, the team participated in the Russian Cup and won the Russian Super Cup.

== Season events ==
On 20 January, Zenit and Botafogo announced that Luiz Henrique had signed for Zenit on a four-year contract with the option of a fifth year, with Artur moving in the opposite direction and Wendel agreeing to join Botafogo at the end of the season.

On 22 January, Zenit announced that Claudinho had left the club to sign for Al Sadd.

On 12 February, Zenit announced the signing of Ognjen Mimović on loan for the remainder of the season from Fenerbahçe.

On 21 February, Zenit announced the signing of Saša Zdjelar from CSKA Moscow on a contract until the summer of 2026.

On 28 February, Zenit announced that Rodrigão had left the club after his contract was terminated early.

On 21 May, Wendel's proposed move to Botafogo fell through after the US Government imposed new economic sanctions on Zenit.

== Squad ==
As of match played 24 May 2025

No.	Name	Nationality	Position	Date of birth (age)	Signed from	Signed in	Contract ends	Apps.	Goals
Goalkeepers
1	Yevgeni Latyshonok	(Russia)	GK	21 June 1998 (aged 26)	Baltika Kaliningrad	2024	2028 (+1)	28	0
16	Denis Adamov	(Russia)	GK	20 February 1998 (aged 27)	Sochi	2023	2027 (+1)	32	0
41	Mikhail Kerzhakov	(Russia)	GK	28 January 1987 (aged 38)	Anzhi Makhachkala	2015	2025	137	0
	Nikita Goylo	(Russia)	GK	10 August 1998 (aged 26)	Academy	2016		0	0
	Georgy Korolyov	(Russia)	GK	22 August 2003 (aged 21)	Academy	2024		0	0
Defenders
2	Dmitri Chistyakov	(Russia)	DF	13 January 1994 (aged 31)	Rostov	2021	2025	90	2
3	Douglas Santos (captain)	(Brazil)	DF	22 March 1994 (aged 31)	Hamburger SV	2019	2027 (+1)	217	7
4	Yuri Gorshkov	(Russia)	DF	21 June 1998 (aged 26)	Krylia Sovetov	2024	2027 (+1)	26	0
6	Vanja Drkušić	(Slovenia)	DF	30 October 1999 (aged 25)	Sochi	2024	2029	10	0
15	Vyacheslav Karavayev	(Russia)	DF	20 May 1995 (aged 30)	Vitesse	2019	2026(+1)	165	4
25	Strahinja Eraković	(Serbia)	DF	22 January 2001 (aged 24)	Red Star Belgrade	2023	2027(+1)	66	0
27	Nino	(Brazil)	DF	10 April 1997 (aged 28)	Fluminense	2024	2028	51	3
28	Nuraly Alip	(Kazakhstan)	DF	22 December 1999 (aged 25)	Kairat	2023	2025(+1)	71	2
70	Ognjen Mimović	(Serbia)	DF	17 August 2004 (aged 20)	on loan from Fenerbahçe	2025	2025	5	0
82	Sergei Volkov	(Russia)	DF	9 September 2002 (aged 22)	Krasnodar	2024	2028 (+1)	3	0
Midfielders
5	Wilmar Barrios	(Colombia)	MF	16 October 1993 (aged 31)	Boca Juniors	2019	2027	225	3
8	Wendel	(Brazil)	MF	28 August 1997 (aged 27)	Sporting CP	2020	2027	149	21
14	Saša Zdjelar	(Serbia)	MF	20 March 1995 (aged 30)	CSKA Moscow	2025	2026	9	0
17	Andrei Mostovoy	(Russia)	MF	5 November 1997 (aged 27)	Khimki	2019	2027(+1)	174	35
21	Aleksandr Yerokhin	(Russia)	MF	13 October 1989 (aged 35)	Rostov	2017	2025	249	42
31	Gustavo Mantuan	(Brazil)	MF	20 June 2001 (aged 23)	Corinthians	2023	2027(+1)	104	14
70	Nikita Vershinin	(Russia)	MF	8 December 2004 (aged 20)	Academy	2024		2	0
77	Ilzat Akhmetov	(Russia)	MF	31 December 1997 (aged 27)	Krasnodar	2024	2026(+1)	21	0
79	Dmitri Vasilyev	(Russia)	MF	16 June 2004 (aged 20)	Academy	2023	2028	25	2
Forwards
7	Aleksandr Sobolev	(Russia)	FW	7 March 1997 (aged 28)	Spartak Moscow	2024	2027 (+1)	31	7
11	Luiz Henrique	(Brazil)	FW	2 February 2001 (aged 24)	Botafogo	2025	2028 (+1)	14	2
24	Pedro	(Brazil)	FW	5 February 2006 (aged 19)	Corinthians	2024		53	8
30	Mateo Cassierra	(Colombia)	FW	13 April 1997 (aged 28)	Sochi	2022	2025(+1)	110	41
32	Luciano Gondou	(Argentina)	FW	22 June 2001 (aged 23)	Argentinos Juniors	2024	2028 (+1)	29	11
67	Maksim Glushenkov	(Russia)	FW	28 July 1999 (aged 25)	Lokomotiv Moscow	2024	2028 (+1)	27	11
86	Yevgeny Pshennikov	(Russia)	FW	16 May 2004 (aged 21)	Academy	2024		1	0
Also under contract
83	Kirill Stolbov	(Russia)	MF	8 April 2004 (aged 21)	Academy	2024		1	0
Away on loan
	Bogdan Moskvichyov	(Russia)	GK	30 April 2004 (aged 21)	Academy	2022		0	0
	Daniil Odoyevsky	(Russia)	GK	12 January 2003 (aged 22)	Academy	2020		11	0
	Robert Renan	(Brazil)	DF	11 October 2003 (aged 21)	Corinthians	2023	2028	18	0
	Arsen Adamov	(Russia)	DF	20 October 1999 (aged 25)	Ural Yekaterinburg	2022	2026	21	0
	Matvey Bardachyov	(Russia)	DF	24 March 2006 (aged 19)	Academy	2023		0	0
	Ilya Kirsh	(Russia)	DF	21 September 2004 (aged 20)	Academy	2023		0	0
	Du Queiroz	(Brazil)	MF	7 January 2000 (aged 25)	Corinthians	2023	2028	16	1
	Zelimkhan Bakayev	(Russia)	MF	1 July 1996 (aged 28)	Spartak Moscow	2022	2025(+1)	33	2
	Aleksei Sutormin	(Russia)	MF	10 January 1994 (aged 31)	Rubin Kazan	2019	2025	126	13
	Yaroslav Mikhaylov	(Russia)	MF	28 April 2003 (aged 22)	Pari Nizhny Novgorod	2023	2027	1	0
Left during the season
6	Mário Fernandes	(Russia)	DF	19 September 1990 (aged 34)	Internacional	2023	2024	18	0
9	Artur	(Brazil)	MF	15 February 1998 (aged 27)	Palmeiras	2024	2027(+1)	36	7
10	Wilson Isidor	(France)	FW	27 August 2000 (aged 24)	Lokomotiv Moscow	2024		26	4
11	Claudinho	(Brazil)	MF	28 January 1997 (aged 28)	Red Bull Bragantino	2021	2027	124	21
33	Ivan Sergeyev	(Russia)	FW	11 May 1995 (aged 30)	Krylia Sovetov	2022	2025	93	29
55	Rodrigão	(Brazil)	DF	11 September 1995 (aged 29)	Sochi	2022	2025	56	3
69	Artur Maksimchuk	(Russia)	FW	2 January 2002 (aged 23)	Metallurg Lipetsk	2024		0	0
73	Kirill Dontsov	(Russia)	DF	21 December 2001 (aged 23)	on loan from Rotor Volgograd	2024		0	0
98	Maksim Timofeyev	(Russia)	GK	1 May 2002 (aged 23)	Krylia Sovetov Samara	2024	2024	0	0

== Transfers ==
=== In ===
Date	Position	Nationality	Name	From	Fee	Ref.
14 June 2024	GK	(Russia)	Yevgeni Latyshonok	Baltika Kaliningrad	Undisclosed	
20 June 2024	MF	(Russia)	Maksim Glushenkov	Lokomotiv Moscow	Undisclosed	
24 June 2024	DF	(Russia)	Yuri Gorshkov	Krylia Sovetov Samara	Undisclosed	
24 June 2024	DF	(Russia)	Sergei Volkov	Krasnodar	Undisclosed	
5 July 2024	FW	(France)	Wilson Isidor	Lokomotiv Moscow	Undisclosed	
6 July 2024	GK	(Russia)	Maksim Timofeyev	Krylia Sovetov Samara	Undisclosed	
13 August 2024	DF	(Slovenia)	Vanja Drkušić	Sochi	Undisclosed	
27 August 2024	FW	(Argentina)	Luciano Gondou	Argentinos Juniors	Undisclosed	
30 August 2024	FW	(Russia)	Aleksandr Sobolev	Spartak Moscow	Undisclosed	
20 January 2025	FW	(Brazil)	Luiz Henrique	Botafogo	Undisclosed	
21 February 2025	MF	(Serbia)	Saša Zdjelar	CSKA Moscow	Undisclosed	

=== Loans in ===
Date from	Position	Nationality	Name	From	Date to	Ref.
12 February 2025	DF	(Serbia)	Ognjen Mimović	Fenerbahçe	End of season	

=== Out ===
Date	Position	Nationality	Name	To	Fee	Ref.
19 June 2024	MF	(Russia)	Ilya Rodionov	Chernomorets Novorossiysk	Undisclosed	
21 June 2024	MF	(Russia)	Aleksey Baranovsky	Orenburg	Undisclosed	
22 June 2024	MF	(Russia)	Vladislav Saus	Baltika Kaliningrad	Undisclosed	
4 July 2024	FW	(Russia)	Stanislav Lapinsky	Pari Nizhny Novgorod	Undisclosed	
5 July 2024	DF	(Belarus)	Ilya Moskalenchik	Alania Vladikavkaz	Undisclosed	
16 August 2024	MF	(Russia)	Aleksandr Kovalenko	Orenburg	Undisclosed	
5 September 2024	FW	(Russia)	Ivan Sergeyev	Krylia Sovetov Samara	Undisclosed	
20 January 2025	MF	(Brazil)	Artur	Botafogo	Undisclosed	
22 January 2025	MF	(Brazil)	Claudinho	Al Sadd	Undisclosed	
1 February 2025	FW	(France)	Wilson Isidor	Sunderland	Undisclosed	

=== Loans out ===
Date from	Position	Nationality	Name	To	Date to	Ref.
14 June 2024	DF	(Russia)	Ilya Kirsh	Dynamo Makhachkala	End of season	
20 June 2024	DF	(Russia)	Arsen Adamov	Akhmat Grozny	End of season	
21 June 2024	GK	(Russia)	Bogdan Moskvichyov	Orenburg	End of season	
11 July 2024	MF	(Russia)	Kirill Stolbov	Chernomorets Novorossiysk	6 September 2024	
19 July 2024	GK	(Russia)	Daniil Odoyevsky	Rostov	End of season	
2 August 2024	MF	(Russia)	Zelimkhan Bakayev	Khimki	End of season	
16 August 2024	DF	(Slovenia)	Vanja Drkušić	Red Star Belgrade	End of season	
15 August 2024	MF	(Russia)	Aleksei Sutormin	Rostov	End of season	
20 August 2024	GK	(Russia)	Nikita Goylo	Dynamo Makhachkala	End of season	
23 August 2024	FW	(France)	Wilson Isidor	Sunderland	1 February 2025	
29 August 2024	DF	(Russia)	Matvey Bardachyov	Ural Yekaterinburg	Undisclosed	
3 September 2024	DF	(Brazil)	Robert Renan	Al Shabab	End of season	
26 February 2025	MF	(Brazil)	Du Queiroz	Sport Recife	31 December 2025	

=== Released ===
Date	Position	Nationality	Name	Joined	Date	Ref.
3 June 2024	GK	(Russia)	Aleksandr Vasyutin	Akron Tolyatti	21 June 2024	
3 June 2024	DF	(Russia)	Danil Krugovoy	CSKA Moscow	4 June 2024	
30 June 2024	DF	(Russia)	Stefan Kalinov			
30 June 2024	DF	(Russia)	Artemy Kosogorov	Shinnik Yaroslavl	1 July 2024	
30 June 2024	DF	(Russia)	Damir Shaykhtdinov	Rodina Moscow		
30 June 2024	MF	(Russia)	Roman Nogtev			
30 June 2024	FW	(Russia)	Akim Belokhonov	Rodina-2 Moscow		
30 June 2024	FW	(Russia)	Igor Bugayenko	Khimik Dzerzhinsk		
30 June 2024	FW	(Russia)	Aleksey Kolyshev			
31 July 2024	DF	(Russia)	Mário Fernandes			
31 December 2024	GK	(Russia)	Maksim Timofeyev			
31 December 2024	FW	(Russia)	Artur Maksimchuk	Kaluga		
28 February 2025	DF	(Brazil)	Rodrigão			

== Friendlies ==
2 July 2024	Zenit St.Petersburg	5–2	Sochi
16:00 MSK (UTC+3)	Wendel (yellow card) 14'; Cassierra 20', 24'; Mostovoy 45+1'; Rodrigão (yellow card) 60'; Yerokhin 67'; Mantuan 69'; Sutormin (yellow card) 85'	Report	Alves 32'; Zaika 41'

5 July 2024	Zenit St.Petersburg	1–0	Talleres
19:30 MSK (UTC+3)	Mantuan 65' (pen.); Vasilyev (yellow card) 85'; Alip (red card) 90+3'	Report	Botta (red card) 61'; Herrera (red card) 90+4'; Saavedra (red card) 90+4'

8 July 2024	Zenit St.Petersburg	1–2	Red Star Belgrade
19:30 MSK (UTC+3)	Claudinho 5'; Rodrigão (yellow card) 36'; Barrios (yellow card) 60'; Pedro (yellow card) 77'	Report	Katai 49'; Leković 86'; Ndiaye (yellow card) 90'

8 September 2024	Kairat	3–4	Zenit St.Petersburg	Almaty
17:00 MSK (UTC+3)	Shvyryov (yellow card) 19' (goal) 90+2'; Artur 54' (o.g.); Sorokin (yellow card) 61'; Paulo (yellow card) 65'; Stanojev 66'	Report	Yerokhin 37'; Cassierra 51'; Gondou 73', 78' (yellow card) 83'	Stadium: Central Stadium

12 October 2024	Zenit St.Petersburg	4–1	Vojvodina	Saint Petersburg
19:00 MSK (UTC+3)	Sobolev 10', 39'; Mantuan 45'; Gondou 48'	Report	Crnomarković (yellow card) 14' (goal) 25'; Yusuf (yellow card) 20'; Savićević (yellow card) 20'	Stadium: Krestovsky Stadium; Attendance: 17,822; Referee: Artem Lyubimov

15 November 2024	Fenerbahçe	2–1	Zenit St.Petersburg	Istanbul
20:00 MSK (UTC+3)	Tosun 20'; Mercan 63'	Report	Yerokhin 35'	Stadium: Şükrü Saracoğlu Stadium; Attendance: 47,430; Referee: Ozan Ergün (Turkey)

21 January 2025	Zenit St.Petersburg	1–1	Jordan	Doha, Qatar
17:00 MSK (UTC+3)	Glushenkov 64'	Report	Al-Rosan 53'	Stadium: Abdullah bin Khalifa Stadium

24 January 2025	Zenit St.Petersburg	1-0	Jordan	Doha, Qatar
20:00 MSK (UTC+3)	Gondou (yellow card) 44'; Yerokhin (yellow card) 52'; Sobolev 62'	Report		Stadium: Grand Hamad Stadium

27 January 2025	Zenit St.Petersburg	1–3	Dynamo Moscow	Al Rayyan, Qatar
11:00 MSK (UTC+3)	Wendel (yellow card) 37'; Barrios (yellow card) 78'; Sobolev 80'; Chernov (yellow card) 83'	Report	Marichal 58'; Fomin 70'; Dasa (yellow card) 76'; Gladyshev 86'	Stadium: Aspire Dome

27 January 2025	Zenit St.Petersburg	1–2	Noah	Al Rayyan, Qatar
17:30 MSK (UTC+3)	Yerokhin 75'	Report	Gregório 30' (pen.); Khudaverdyan (yellow card) 43'; Aiás 70'	Stadium: Aspire Dome

4 February 2025	Zenit St.Petersburg	2–2 (4–1 p)	CSKA Moscow	Abu Dhabi, United Arab Emirates
19:30 MSK (UTC+3)	Mostovoy (yellow card) 23'; Glushenkov (yellow card) 29'; Douglas 49'; Sobolev 90'	Report	Zdjelar (yellow card) 43'; Willyan (yellow card) 48'; Kislyak 57'; Shumansky 88'	Stadium: Al Nahyan Stadium; Referee: Artem Chistyakov
	Penalties
	Sobolev (penalty scored); Cassierra (penalty scored); Akhmetov (penalty scored); Gorshkov (penalty scored)		(penalty missed) Fayzullaev; (penalty scored) Bistrović; (penalty missed) Shumansky

7 February 2025	Rostov	1–2	Zenit St.Petersburg	Abu Dhabi, United Arab Emirates
15:00 MSK (UTC+3)	Shchetinin (yellow card) 30'; Radchenko 89'; Petrov (yellow card) 90+2'	Report	Akhmetov 32'; Gondou 85'	Stadium: Al Nahyan Stadium

11 February 2025	Zenit St.Petersburg	2–0	Pyunik	Abu Dhabi, United Arab Emirates
10:00 MSK (UTC+3)	Yerokhin 38'; Alip (yellow card) 74'; Sobolev 86'	Report		Stadium: Emirates Palace

11 February 2025	Zenit St.Petersburg	3–0	Spartak Moscow	Abu Dhabi, United Arab Emirates
19:30 MSK (UTC+3)	Henrique 15'; Wendel 28'; Cassierra 32'; Drkušić (yellow card) 34'; Barrios (yellow card) 71'	Report	Denisov (yellow card) 12'; Martins (yellow card) 55' (yellow-red card) 69'; Khlusevich (yellow card) 78'; Babić (yellow card) 90'	Stadium: Al Nahyan Stadium; Referee: Kirill Levnikov

22 March 2025	Zenit St.Petersburg	5–0	BATE Borisov	Saint Petersburg
17:00 MSK (UTC+3)	Akhmetov 14'; Wendel 16'; Nino 25'; Sobolev 56', 62'; Khokhlov (yellow card) 86'	Report	Lyakh (yellow card) 12'; Charles (yellow card) 25'; Piletsky (yellow card) 66'	Stadium: Krestovsky Stadium; Attendance: 23,890; Referee: Ivan Saraev

== Competitions ==
=== Overall record ===
Competition	First match	Last match	Starting round	Final position	Record							
Competition	First match	Last match	Starting round	Final position	Pld	W	D	L	GF	GA	GD	Win %
Premier League	20 July 2024	24 May 2025	Matchday 1	2nd	30	20	6	4	58	18	+40	66.67
Russian Cup	30 July 2024	14 May 2025	Group stage	RPL path Final	12	10	1	1	23	5	+18	83.33
Super Cup	13 July 2024		Final	Winners	1	1	0	0	4	2	+2	100.00
Total					43	31	7	5	85	25	+60	72.09

Last updated: 24 May 2025
Source: Soccerway

=== Super Cup ===
13 July 2024	Zenit St.Petersburg	4–2	Krasnodar	Volgograd
20:30 MSK (UTC+3)	Rodrigão 13'; Wendel 33'; Glushenkov 42', 68'; Mantuan (yellow card) 86'	Report	Pina (yellow card) 39'; Krivtsov 65'; Smolov 70'	Stadium: Volgograd Arena; Attendance: 41,084; Referee: Pavel Kukuian

=== Premier League ===
==== League table ====
Pos	Team	Pld	W	D	L	GF	GA	GD	Pts
1	Krasnodar (C)	30	20	7	3	59	23	+36	67
2	Zenit Saint Petersburg	30	20	6	4	58	18	+40	66
3	CSKA Moscow	30	17	8	5	47	21	+26	59
4	Spartak Moscow	30	17	6	7	56	25	+31	57
5	Dynamo Moscow	30	16	8	6	61	35	+26	56

Source: Premier Liga
Rules for classification: 1) Points; 2) Head-to-head points; 3) Head-to-head matches won; 4) Head-to-head goal difference; 5) Head-to-head goals scored; 6) Matches won; 7) Goal difference; 8) Goals scored; 9) 2023–24 position (not applicable to final standings); 10) Play-off. Note: if teams tied on points did not play an equal number of head-to-head games, head-to-head results are not considered for the standings.
(C) Champions

==== Results summary ====
Overall								Home						Away					
Pld	W	D	L	GF	GA	GD	Pts	W	D	L	GF	GA	GD	W	D	L	GF	GA	GD
30	20	6	4	56	17	+39	66	10	3	2	28	9	+19	10	3	2	28	8	+20

Last updated: 18 May 2025.

==== Results by round ====
Round	1	2	3	4	5	6	7	8	9	10	11	12	13	14	15	16	17	18	19	20	21	22	23	24	25	26	27	28	29	30
Ground	A	A	H	H	A	H	A	A	H	A	H	A	H	H	A	A	H	H	H	A	A	H	A	H	H	A	H	A	A	H
Result	W	W	W	W	D	D	W	W	W	L	W	W	D	W	W	W	L	L	D	W	L	W	D	W	W	D	W	W	W	W
Position	1	1	1	1	1	2	1	1	1	3	3	2	2	2	2	1	1	2	3	2	3	2	3	2	2	2	2	2	2	2

Updated to match(es) played on 24 May 2025. Source:
A = Away; H = Home; W = Win; D = Draw; L = Loss

==== Matches ====
The match schedule was released on 20 June 2024.

20 July 2024 1	Krylia Sovetov Samara	0–4	Zenit St.Petersburg	Samara
17:30 MSK (UTC+3)		Report	Glushenkov 6', 45+2'; Cassierra 18'; Artur (yellow card) 33'; Pedro 90+3'	Stadium: Solidarnost Samara Arena; Attendance: 15,839; Referee: Sergey Ivanov

27 July 2024 2	Rubin Kazan	0–4	Zenit St.Petersburg	Kazan
17:30 MSK (UTC+3)	Teslenko (yellow card) 48'; Daku (yellow card) 89'	Report	Glushenkov 36'; Cassierra 44' (pen.); Pedro 55'; Isidor 90+2'	Stadium: Ak Bars Arena; Attendance: 14,575; Referee: Artem Chistyakov

3 August 2024 3	Zenit St.Petersburg	5–0	Rostov	Saint Petersburg
17:30 MSK (UTC+3)	Pedro 19'; Glushenkov 25', 35', 67'; Cassierra 32'; Nino (yellow card) 58'	Report	Glebov (yellow card) 36'	Stadium: Krestovsky Stadium; Attendance: 24,949; Referee: Vitali Meshkov

10 August 2024 4	Zenit St.Petersburg	1–0	Dynamo Moscow	Saint Petersburg
17:30 MSK (UTC+3)	Glushenkov 55', (yellow card) 57'; Claudinho (yellow card) 69'; Barrios (yellow card) 87'	Report	Carrascal (yellow card) 47'; Moumi Ngamaleu (yellow card) 62'; Dasa (yellow card) 89'	Stadium: Krestovsky Stadium; Attendance: 34,917; Referee: Sergey Ivanov

18 August 2024 5	Khimki	1–1	Zenit St.Petersburg	Khimki
15:00 MSK (UTC+3)	Zabolotnyi (yellow card) 39'; Fariña 56'; Rudenko (yellow card) 70'	Report	Mostovoy 89'	Stadium: Arena Khimki; Attendance: 4,238; Referee: Aleksey Sukhoy

24 August 2024 6	Zenit St.Petersburg	0–0	Spartak Moscow	Saint Petersburg
17:30 MSK (UTC+3)	Eraković (yellow card) 56' (yellow-red card); Santos (yellow card) 90+4'	Report	Martins (yellow card) 12'; Medina (yellow card) 34'; Umyarov (yellow card) 36'; Denisov (yellow card) 65'	Stadium: Krestovsky Stadium; Attendance: 48,534; Referee: Vitali Meshkov

31 August 2024 7	Pari Nizhny Novgorod	0–3	Zenit St.Petersburg	Nizhny Novgorod
17:30 MSK (UTC+3)	Mukhin (yellow card) 49'	Report	Gondou 30', 56'; Wendel 69'	Stadium: Nizhny Novgorod Stadium; Attendance: 14,205; Referee: Sergey Ivanov

14 September 2024 8	CSKA Moscow	0–1	Zenit St.Petersburg	Moscow
16:30 MSK (UTC+3)	Gajić (yellow card) 33'; Moisés (yellow card) 80'; Oblyakov (yellow card) 83'; Khellven (yellow card) 90+3'	Report	Gondou 43'; Wendel (yellow card) 44'; Barrios (yellow card) 45+1'; Alip (yellow card) 80'; Nino (yellow card) 83'	Stadium: VEB Arena; Attendance: 22,851; Referee: Aleksey Sukhoy

21 September 2024 9	Zenit St.Petersburg	3–1	Fakel Voronezh	Saint Petersburg
16:30 MSK (UTC+3)	Sobolev (yellow card) 43'; Cassierra 52'; Gondou 67' (yellow card) 83'; Yerokhin 87'	Report	Markov 8' (pen.) (yellow card) 45'; Yakimov (yellow card) 58'; Alshin (yellow card) 61'	Stadium: Krestovsky Stadium; Attendance: 29,442; Referee: Pavel Kukuyan

28 September 2024 10	Krasnodar	2–0	Zenit St.Petersburg	Krasnodar
19:30 MSK (UTC+3)	Tormena (yellow card) 14'; Chernikov (yellow card) 43'; Córdoba 88'; Smolov 90+4'	Report	Mantuan (yellow card) 23'; Claudinho (yellow card) 27'; Nino (yellow card) 62'	Stadium: Krasnodar Stadium; Attendance: 34,538; Referee: Aleksey Sukhoy

5 October 2024 11	Zenit St.Petersburg	1–0	Orenburg	Saint Petersburg
16:30 MSK (UTC+3)	Mantuan 61' (pen.); Wendel (yellow card) 71'	Report	Malykh (yellow card) 60'; Sidorov (yellow card) 73'; Oganesyan (yellow card) 74'; Ghorbani (yellow card) 90+'	Stadium: Krestovsky Stadium; Attendance: 24,316; Referee: Roman Safyan

18 October 2024 12	Akron Togliatti	0–5	Zenit St.Petersburg	Samara
18:00 MSK (UTC+3)	Savichev (yellow card) 49' (yellow-red card) 75'	Report	Mostovoy 16', 39'; Cassierra 45'; Gondou 52'; Artur 85'	Stadium: Solidarnost Samara Arena; Attendance: 4,693; Referee: Evgeniy Bulanov

27 October 2024 13	Zenit St.Petersburg	1–1	Lokomotiv Moscow	Saint Petersburg
19:30 MSK (UTC+3)	Claudinho (yellow card) 45'; Mostovoy 51'; Wendel (yellow card) 59'; Mantuan (yellow card) 90+'	Report	Vorobyov (yellow card) 33'; Batrakov (yellow card) 59' (goal) 68'; Suleymanov (yellow card) 86'; Barinov (yellow card) 90+'	Stadium: Krestovsky Stadium; Attendance: 38,779; Referee: Sergei Karasev

2 November 2024 14	Zenit St.Petersburg	2–1	Dynamo Makhachkala	Saint Petersburg
18:00 MSK (UTC+3)	Nino 12'; Gondou 15' (yellow card) 36'; Mantuan (yellow card) 90+'	Report	Kirsh (yellow card) 4'; Glushkov (yellow card) 45+'; Kagermazov 61'	Stadium: Krestovsky Stadium; Attendance: 20,952; Referee: Vitali Meshkov

10 November 2024 15	Akhmat Grozny	1–2	Zenit St.Petersburg	Grozny
17:30 MSK (UTC+3)	Adamov 2'; Sadulayev (yellow card) 51'; Kamilov (red card) 90+'	Report	Mantuan 9'; Cassierra 21'; Barrios (yellow card) 82'	Stadium: Akhmat-Arena; Attendance: 4,883; Referee: Artem Chistyakov

23 November 2024 16	Orenburg	0–1	Zenit St.Petersburg	Orenburg
12:00 MSK (UTC+3)	Kovalenko (red card) 31'	Report	Sobolev (yellow card) 20'; Yerokhin 90+'	Stadium: Gazovik Stadium; Attendance: 3,815; Referee: Sergei Karasev

1 December 2024 17	Zenit St.Petersburg	2–3	Krylia Sovetov Samara	Saint Petersburg
16:30 MSK (UTC+3)	Glushenkov 4'; Alip 72'	Report	Sergeyev 17', 28'; Oleynikov 18'; Oroz (yellow card) 36'; Pesyakov (yellow card) 90+'	Stadium: Krestovsky Stadium; Attendance: 28,820; Referee: Evgeniy Kukulyak

7 December 2024 18	Zenit St.Petersburg	1–2	Akron Tolyatti	Saint Petersburg
16:30 MSK (UTC+3)	Mostovoy 21'; Wendel (yellow card) 49'; Gondou (yellow card) 90+'	Report	Lončar 10' (yellow card) 45+'; Dzyuba 40'; Danilin (yellow card) 49' (yellow-red card) 55'; Bokoyev (yellow card) 63'; Bardybakhin (yellow card) 87'; Fernández (yellow card) 90+'	Stadium: Krestovsky Stadium; Attendance: 30,006; Referee: Vladimir Moskalyov

1 March 2025 19	Zenit St.Petersburg	0–0	CSKA Moscow	Saint Petersburg
16:30 MSK (UTC+3)	Eraković (yellow card) 58'; Yerokhin (yellow card) 90+'	Report	Pjanić (yellow card) 47'; Willyan (yellow card) 67'; Kislyak (yellow card) 90+'	Stadium: Krestovsky Stadium; Attendance: 50,544; Referee: Sergey Ivanov

8 March 2025 20	Fakel Voronezh	0–2	Zenit St.Petersburg	Voronezh
14:30 MSK (UTC+3)	Moțpan (yellow card) 8'; Dziov (yellow card) 32'; Yakimov (red card) 37'; Senhadji (yellow card) 44'	Report	Gondou 19'; Cassierra 57'; Wendel (red card) 74'; Vershinin (yellow card) 78'	Stadium: Fakel Stadium; Attendance: 8,973; Referee: Vitali Meshkov

16 March 2025 21	Spartak Moscow	2–1	Zenit St.Petersburg	Moscow
19:45 MSK (UTC+3)	Babić (yellow card) 27'; Umyarov (yellow card) 31'; Martins 45+', 90' (yellow card) 81'; Reabciuk (yellow card) 73'	Report	Henrique (yellow card) 53' (goal) 83'; Eraković (yellow card) 90+'	Stadium: Lukoil Arena; Attendance: 40,109; Referee: Sergey Ivanov

30 March 2025 22	Zenit St.Petersburg	4–0	Rubin Kazan	Saint Petersburg
19:30 MSK (UTC+3)	Mantuan (yellow card) 34' (goal) 59'; Gondou 51'; Cassierra 73'; Mostovoy 74'	Report	Gritsayenko (yellow card) 45' (yellow-red card) 54'; Zotov (yellow card) 88'	Stadium: Krestovsky Stadium; Attendance: 33,806; Referee: Pavel Kukuyan

5 April 2025 23	Lokomotiv Moscow	1–1	Zenit St.Petersburg	Moscow
17:30 MSK (UTC+3)	Nenakhov (yellow card) 32'; Batrakov 62'; Barinov (yellow card) 90+'	Report	Pedro (yellow card) 81' (yellow-red card) 90+'; Sobolev 85'	Stadium: RZD Arena; Attendance: 20,941; Referee: Artem Chistyakov

13 April 2025 24	Zenit St.Petersburg	4–1	Krasnodar	Saint Petersburg
17:00 MSK (UTC+3)	Mostovoy 29' (yellow card) 73'; Gondou 38'; Mantuan (yellow card) 73'; Henrique (yellow card) 76' (goal) 90'; Glushenkov 80'	Report	Krivtsov 16'; Chernikov (yellow card) 53'; Olaza (yellow card) 71'; Pina (yellow card) 88'	Stadium: Krestovsky Stadium; Attendance: 57,101; Referee: Pavel Kukuyan

20 April 2025 25	Zenit St.Petersburg	1–0	Khimki	Saint Petersburg
16:30 MSK (UTC+3)	Gondou 22'	Report	Vera (yellow card) 84'	Stadium: Krestovsky Stadium; Attendance: 30,821; Referee: Pavel Shadykhanov

26 April 2025 26	Dynamo Moscow	1–1	Zenit St.Petersburg	Moscow
14:00 MSK (UTC+3)	Pedro 18'; Glushenkov (yellow card) 60'; Barrios (yellow card) 90+'	Report	Gladyshev 41'; Fomin (yellow card) 47'; Fernández (yellow card) 67'	Stadium: VTB Arena; Attendance: 19,126; Referee: Vitali Meshkov

4 May 2025 27	Zenit St.Petersburg	2–1	Pari Nizhny Novgorod	Saint Petersburg
19:30 MSK (UTC+3)	Glushenkov (yellow card) 26'; Sobolev 54', 83'	Report	Grulyov 14'; Karapuzov (yellow card) 27'; Agapov (yellow card) 58'	Stadium: Krestovsky Stadium; Attendance: 29,581; Referee: Sergei Karasev

10 May 2025 28	Dynamo Makhachkala	0–1	Zenit St.Petersburg	Kaspiysk
17:00 MSK (UTC+3)		Report	Nino 37'; Sobolev (yellow card) 81'; Latyshonok (yellow card) 90+'	Stadium: Anzhi Arena; Attendance: 10,882; Referee: Artem Chistyakov

18 May 2025 29	Rostov	0–1	Zenit St.Petersburg	Rostov-on-Don
19:00 MSK (UTC+3)	Ignatov (yellow card) 28'; Shamonin (yellow card) 51'; Langovich (yellow card) 55'; Koltakov (yellow card) 59'; Osipenko (yellow card) 90+'	Report	Sobolev 30'; Barrios (yellow card) 90+'	Stadium: Rostov Arena; Attendance: 28,315; Referee: Evgeniy Kukulyak

24 May 2025 30	Zenit St.Petersburg	3–0	Akhmat Grozny	Saint Petersburg
16:30 MSK (UTC+3)	Mostovoy 25' (pen.), 45+' (pen.); Pedro 59'	Report	Zhirov (yellow card) 12'; Kamilov (yellow card) 23'; Samorodov (yellow card) 32'	Stadium: Krestovsky Stadium; Attendance: 52,799; Referee: Sergey Ivanov

=== Russian Cup ===
==== Group stage ====
Pos	Team	Pld	W	PW	PL	L	GF	GA	GD	Pts	Qualification
1	Zenit Saint Petersburg	6	5	0	1	0	13	2	+11	16	Qualification to the Knockout phase (RPL path)
2	Rubin Kazan	6	3	0	0	3	7	4	+3	9	Qualification to the Knockout phase (RPL path)
3	Akron Tolyatti	6	2	1	0	3	6	12	−6	8	Qualification to the Knockout phase (regions path)
4	Fakel Voronezh	6	1	0	0	5	2	10	−8	3	

Source: Russian Football Union (in Russian), Soccerway
Rules for classification: 1) Points; 2) Head-to-head points; 3) Head-to-head matches won; 4) Head-to-head goal difference; 5) Head-to-head goals scored; 6) Matches won; 7) Goal difference; 8) Goals scored; 9) Penalty shoot-out goal difference; 10) Draw.

30 July 2024 1	Zenit St.Petersburg	3–0	Fakel Voronezh	Saint Petersburg
21:00 MSK (UTC+3)	Erokhin 25'; Nino (yellow card) 66'; Cherov 70' (o.g.); Isidor 84'	Report	Dziov (yellow card) 9'; Bagamev (red card) 88'	Stadium: Krestovsky Stadium; Attendance: 27,927; Referee: Rafael Shafeev

14 August 2024 2	Rubin Kazan	0–1	Zenit St.Petersburg	Kazan
17:15 MSK (UTC+3)	Ashurmatov (yellow card) 33'; Rakhmonaliyev (yellow card) 83'; Vujačić (yellow card) 90+3'; Zotov (yellow card) 90+7'; Ivanov (yellow card) 90+7'	Report	Vasiljev 59'	Stadium: Ak Bars Arena; Attendance: 14,112; Referee: Mikhail Cheremnykh

27 August 2024 3	Akron Tolyatti	1–1 (5–4 p)	Zenit St.Petersburg	Samara
18:15 MSK (UTC+3)	Esanov (yellow card) 48'; Timoshenko 54' (pen.); Khubulov (yellow card) 65'; Bakaev (yellow card) 73'	Report	Alip (yellow card) 37'; Vasiljev 45+2', (yellow card) 84'	Stadium: Solidarnost Samara Arena; Attendance: 4,834; Referee: Sergey Tsyganok
	Penalties
	Kuzmin (penalty scored); Bakaev (penalty scored); Timoshenko (penalty scored); Júnior (penalty scored); Khubulov (penalty scored)		Mantuan (penalty scored); Pedro (penalty scored); Akhmetov (penalty scored); Artur (penalty missed); Claudinho (penalty scored)

17 September 2024 4	Zenit St.Petersburg	2–0	Rubin Kazan	Saint Petersburg
20:00 MSK (UTC+3)	Sobolev (yellow card) 4'; Mantuan 26'; Chistyakov 59'; Artur (yellow card) 89'	Report	Apshatsev (yellow card) 44'	Stadium: Krestovsky Stadium; Attendance: 30,140; Referee: Evgeniy Kukulyak

1 October 2024 5	Zenit St.Petersburg	5–1	Akron Tolyatti	Saint Petersburg
21:15 MSK (UTC+3)	Yerokhin (yellow card) 2' (goal) 6'; Artur 13', 43'; Pedro (yellow card) 39'; Sobolev 61'; Mostovoy 87' (pen.)	Report	Bardybakhin (yellow card) 46' (red card) 80'; Esanov (yellow card) 79'; Moskvichyov 90+2'	Stadium: Krestovsky Stadium; Attendance: 21,777; Referee: Egor Egorov

22 October 2024 6	Fakel Voronezh	0–1	Zenit St.Petersburg	Voronezh
16:15 MSK (UTC+3)	Masternoy (yellow card) 28'; Bryzgalov (yellow card) 90+5'	Report	Yerokhin 44'	Stadium: Fakel Stadium; Attendance: 7,154; Referee: Ivan Abrosimov

==== Knockout phase ====
6 November 2024 RPL path Quarterfinals 1st leg	Zenit St.Petersburg	3–0	Akhmat Grozny	Saint Petersburg
20:45 MSK (UTC+3)	Claudinho 20'; Chistyakov (yellow card) 41'; Cassierra 53'; Sobolev 88'	Report	Silva (yellow card) 5'; Samorodov (yellow card) 84'	Stadium: Krestovsky Stadium; Attendance: 20,570; Referee: Evgeniy Kukulyak

27 November 2024 RPL path Quarterfinals 2nd leg	Akhmat Grozny	1–2 (1–5 agg.)	Zenit St.Petersburg	Grozny
18:15 MSK (UTC+3)	Kamilov (yellow card) 31'; Felippe (yellow card) 49'; Samorodov 90+1'	Report	Gondou 14'; Artur 72'	Stadium: Akhmat-Arena; Attendance: 5,648; Referee: Egor Egorov

12 March 2025 RPL path Semifinals 1st leg	Rostov	0–1	Zenit St.Petersburg	Rostov-on-Don
18:15 MSK (UTC+3)	Poyarkov (yellow card) 55'; Mohebi (yellow card) 90'	Report	Henrique (yellow card) 55'; Cassierra 79'; Barrios (yellow card) 90'	Stadium: Rostov Arena; Attendance: 27,895; Referee: Aleksey Sukhoy

16 April 2025 RPL path Semifinals 2nd leg	Zenit St.Petersburg	2–0 (3–0 agg.)	Rostov	Saint Petersburg
18:00 MSK (UTC+3)	Sobolev 57'; Cassierra 64'	Report	Sako (yellow card) 62'	Stadium: Krestovsky Stadium; Attendance: 32,050; Referee: Vitali Meshkov

30 April 2025 RPL path Final 1st leg	Zenit St.Petersburg	2–0	CSKA Moscow	Saint Petersburg
20:30 MSK (UTC+3)	Cassiera 17'; Gorshkov (yellow card) 54'; Mostovoy 57' (pen.); Adamov (yellow card) 63'; Zdjelar (yellow card) 72'; Gondou (yellow card) 90+5'	Report	Gajić (yellow card) 8'; Torop (yellow card) 55'; Glebov (yellow card) 63'	Stadium: Krestovsky Stadium; Attendance: 51,580; Referee: Sergey Ivanov

14 May 2025 RPL path Final 2nd leg	CSKA Moscow	2–0 (2–2 agg.) (4–3 p)	Zenit St.Petersburg	Moscow
19:30 MSK (UTC+3)	Kislyak 37' (yellow card) 73'; Oblyakov (penalty missed) 45+2'; Willyan (yellow card) 45+5'; Musayev 90+2'	Report		Stadium: VEB Arena; Attendance: 30,433; Referee: Vitali Meshkov
	Penalties
	Diveyev (penalty scored); Alerrandro (penalty scored); Kislyak (penalty scored); Krugovoy (penalty scored)		(penalty missed) Sobolev; (penalty scored) Douglas; (penalty scored) Mostovoy; (penalty scored) Henrique; (penalty missed) Mantuan

== Squad statistics ==
As of match played 24 May 2025

=== Appearances and goals ===
No.	Pos	Nat	Player	Total		Premier League		Russian Cup		Super Cup	
No.	Pos	Nat	Player	Apps	Goals	Apps	Goals	Apps	Goals	Apps	Goals
1	GK	(Russia) RUS	Yevgeni Latyshonok	28	0	27	0	0	0	1	0
2	DF	(Russia) RUS	Dmitri Chistyakov	8	1	0	0	6+2	1	0	0
3	DF	(Brazil) BRA	Douglas Santos	38	0	30	0	1+6	0	1	0
4	DF	(Russia) RUS	Yuri Gorshkov	26	0	3+12	0	9+1	0	0+1	0
5	MF	(Colombia) COL	Wilmar Barrios	36	0	28	0	5+2	0	1	0
6	DF	(Slovenia) SLO	Vanja Drkušić	10	0	5+2	0	3	0	0	0
7	FW	(Russia) RUS	Aleksandr Sobolev	31	7	9+14	4	5+3	3	0	0
8	MF	(Brazil) BRA	Wendel	27	2	22	1	2+2	0	1	1
11	FW	(Brazil) BRA	Luiz Henrique	14	2	11	2	2+1	0	0	0
14	MF	(Serbia) SRB	Saša Zdjelar	9	0	3+4	0	2	0	0	0
15	DF	(Russia) RUS	Vyacheslav Karavayev	18	0	8+4	0	4+1	0	1	0
16	GK	(Russia) RUS	Denis Adamov	16	0	3+1	0	12	0	0	0
17	MF	(Russia) RUS	Andrei Mostovoy	35	11	16+9	9	7+2	2	1	0
21	MF	(Russia) RUS	Aleksandr Yerokhin	30	5	0+20	2	8+2	3	0	0
24	FW	(Brazil) BRA	Pedro	37	5	16+10	5	7+3	0	0+1	0
25	DF	(Serbia) SRB	Strahinja Eraković	29	0	19+3	0	3+3	0	1	0
27	DF	(Brazil) BRA	Nino	35	2	30	2	5	0	0	0
28	DF	(Kazakhstan) KAZ	Nuraly Alip	29	1	7+12	1	8+1	0	0+1	0
30	FW	(Colombia) COL	Mateo Cassierra	39	12	20+10	8	5+3	4	1	0
31	MF	(Brazil) BRA	Gustavo Mantuan	39	5	20+8	4	5+5	1	0+1	0
32	FW	(Argentina) ARG	Luciano Gondou	28	11	14+8	10	2+4	1	0	0
67	FW	(Russia) RUS	Maksim Glushenkov	27	11	19+2	9	1+4	0	1	2
70	DF	(Serbia) SRB	Ognjen Mimović	6	0	1+3	0	2	0	0	0
77	MF	(Russia) RUS	Ilzat Akhmetov	15	0	0+5	0	7+3	0	0	0
79	MF	(Russia) RUS	Dmitri Vasilyev	9	2	0+2	0	3+4	2	0	0
82	DF	(Russia) RUS	Sergei Volkov	6	0	2+1	0	3	0	0	0
86	FW	(Russia) RUS	Yevgeny Pshennikov	1	0	0	0	0+1	0	0	0
Players away from the club on loan:
70	MF	(Russia) RUS	Nikita Vershinin	2	0	0+1	0	0+1	0	0	0
Players who appeared for Zenit but left during the season:
9	MF	(Brazil) BRA	Artur	19	4	1+10	1	7	3	0+1	0
10	FW	(France) FRA	Wilson Isidor	5	2	0+3	1	0+2	1	0	0
11	MF	(Brazil) BRA	Claudinho	20	1	15+1	0	2+1	1	1	0
33	FW	(Russia) RUS	Ivan Sergeyev	5	0	0+3	0	2	0	0	0
55	DF	(Brazil) BRA	Rodrigão	7	1	1+1	0	4	0	1	1

=== Goal scorers ===
Place	Position	Nation	Number	Name	Premier League	Russian Cup	Super Cup	Total
1	FW	(Colombia)	30	Mateo Cassierra	8	4	0	12
2	FW	(Argentina)	32	Luciano Gondou	10	1	0	11
2	MF	(Russia)	17	Andrei Mostovoy	9	2	0	11
2	FW	(Russia)	67	Maksim Glushenkov	9	0	2	11
5	FW	(Russia)	7	Aleksandr Sobolev	4	3	0	7
6	FW	(Brazil)	24	Pedro	5	0	0	5
6	MF	(Russia)	21	Aleksandr Yerokhin	2	3	0	5
8	MF	(Brazil)	31	Gustavo Mantuan	3	1	0	4
8	MF	(Russia)	9	Artur	1	3	0	4
10	FW	(Brazil)	11	Luiz Henrique	2	0	0	2
10	DF	(Brazil)	27	Nino	2	0	0	2
10	FW	(France)	10	Wilson Isidor	1	1	0	2
10	MF	(Brazil)	8	Wendel	1	0	1	2
10	MF	(Russia)	79	Dmitri Vasilyev	0	2	0	2
15	DF	(Kazakhstan)	28	Nuraly Alip	1	0	0	1
15	DF	(Russia)	2	Dmitri Chistyakov	0	1	0	1
15	MF	(Brazil)	11	Claudinho	0	1	0	1
15	DF	(Brazil)	55	Rodrigão	0	0	1	1
15				Own goal	0	1	0	0
Total					58	23	4	85

=== Clean sheets ===
Place	Position	Nation	Number	Name	Premier League	Russian Cup	Super Cup	Total
1	GK	(Russia)	1	Yevgeni Latyshonok	16	0	1	17
2	GK	(Russia)	16	Denis Adamov	1	8	0	9
Total					17	8	1	26

=== Disciplinary record ===
Number	Nation	Position	Name	Premier League		Russian Cup		Super Cup		Total	
Number	Nation	Position	Name	Yellow card	Red card	Yellow card	Red card	Yellow card	Red card	Yellow card	Red card
1	(Russia)	GK	Yevgeni Latyshonok	1	0	0	0	0	0	1	0
2	(Russia)	DF	Dmitri Chistyakov	0	0	1	0	0	0	1	0
3	(Brazil)	DF	Douglas Santos	1	0	0	0	0	0	1	0
4	(Russia)	DF	Yuri Gorshkov	0	0	1	0	0	0	1	0
5	(Colombia)	MF	Wilmar Barrios	5	0	1	0	0	0	6	0
7	(Russia)	FW	Aleksandr Sobolev	3	0	1	0	0	0	4	0
8	(Brazil)	MF	Wendel	4	1	0	0	0	0	4	1
11	(Brazil)	FW	Luiz Henrique	2	0	1	0	0	0	3	0
14	(Serbia)	MF	Saša Zdjelar	0	0	1	0	0	0	1	0
16	(Russia)	GK	Denis Adamov	0	0	1	0	0	0	1	0
17	(Russia)	MF	Andrei Mostovoy	1	0	0	0	0	0	1	0
21	(Russia)	MF	Aleksandr Yerokhin	1	0	1	0	0	0	2	0
24	(Brazil)	FW	Pedro	2	1	1	0	0	0	3	1
25	(Serbia)	DF	Strahinja Eraković	4	1	0	0	0	0	4	1
27	(Brazil)	DF	Nino	3	0	1	0	0	0	4	0
28	(Kazakhstan)	DF	Nuraly Alip	1	0	1	0	0	0	2	0
31	(Brazil)	MF	Gustavo Mantuan	5	0	0	0	1	0	6	0
32	(Argentina)	FW	Luciano Gondou	3	0	1	0	0	0	4	0
67	(Russia)	FW	Maksim Glushenkov	3	0	0	0	0	0	3	0
70	(Russia)	MF	Nikita Vershinin	1	0	0	0	0	0	1	0
79	(Russia)	MF	Dmitri Vasilyev	0	0	1	0	0	0	1	0
Players away on loan:
Players who left Akhmat Grozny during the season:
9	(Brazil)	MF	Artur	1	0	1	0	0	0	2	0
11	(Brazil)	MF	Claudinho	3	0	0	0	0	0	3	0
Total				44	3	14	0	1	0	59	3
