= Nuraly Alip =

Kazakh footballer (born 1999)

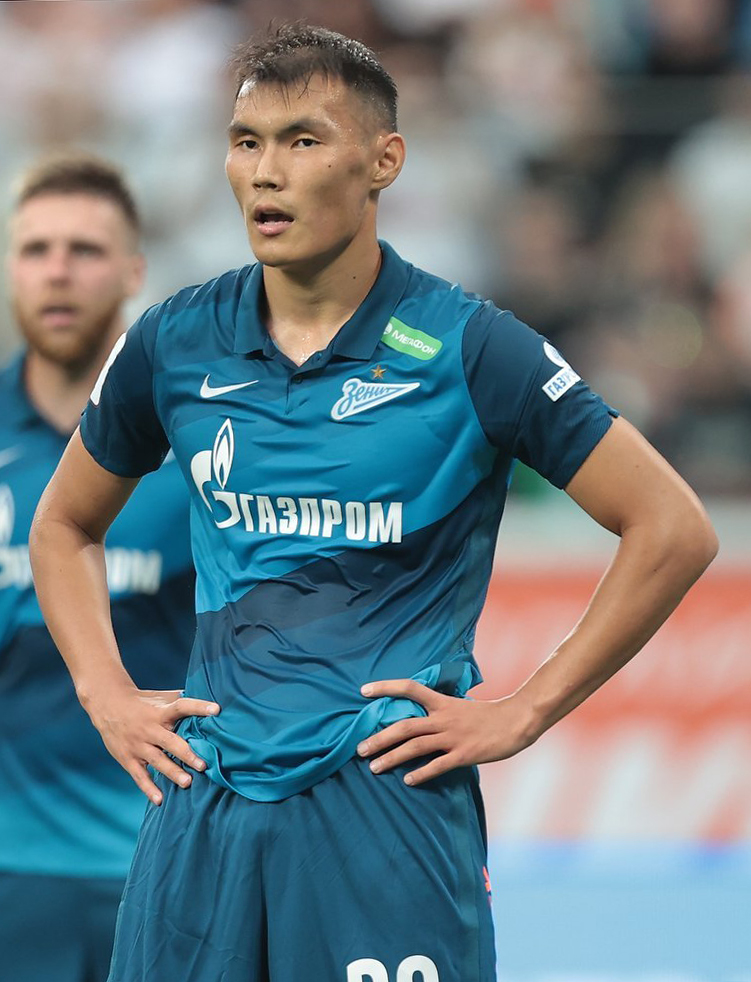
- Alip with Zenit in 2022

Personal information
- Full name: Nuraly Paktuly Alip
- Date of birth: 22 December 1999 (age 26)
- Place of birth: Aktau, Kazakhstan
- Height: 1.88 m (6 ft 2 in)
- Position: Centre-back

Team information
- Current team: Zenit Saint Petersburg
- Number: 28

Youth career
- 2008–2015: Caspiy
- 2015–2018: Kairat

Senior career*
Years	Team	Apps	(Gls)
2018–2022	Kairat	74	(4)
2022	→ Zenit Saint Petersburg (loan)	14	(0)
2023–	Zenit Saint Petersburg	76	(2)

International career^{‡}
2017	Kazakhstan U19	1	(0)
2019	Kazakhstan U21	4	(0)
2018–	Kazakhstan	59	(2)
- * Club domestic league appearances and goals as of 21 November 2026 ‡ National team caps and goals as of 18 November 2026

Nuraly Paktuly Alip (Kazakh: Нұралы Пақтұлы Әліп, Nūraly Paqtūly Älıp, [no̙rɑˈɫɯ ˈpɑqtʰo̙ɫɯ ælˈɘp]; born 22 December 1999) is a Kazakh professional footballer who plays as a centre-back for Russian Premier League club Zenit Saint Petersburg and captains the Kazakhstan national team.

After passing through the youth academies of Caspiy and Kairat, Alip made his debut for the senior Almaty team in 2018. Scoring four goals in 74 appearances, he joined Zenit Saint Petersburg on loan in 2022. Later that same year, Alip signed the club on a permanent deal. With Zenitchiki, he has won three league titles, one Russian Cup title, and one Russian Super Cup title.

== Club career ==
=== Kairat ===
Trained in Caspiy, where he began in 2008, he joined the youth setup of Kairat in 2015. In March 2018, he joined the main team of the Almaty club. He played his first game on 11 March against Kyzylzhar, who won this 2–1 victory.

==== 2021–22: Loan to Zenit Saint Petersburg ====
In January 2022, Alip joined up with Zenit Saint Petersburg for a trial during their week long training camp in the United Arab Emirates. On 16 February 2022, Alip joined Zenit on loan until the end of 2022, with an option to buy.

=== Zenit Saint Petersburg ===
On 14 December 2022, Alip moved to Zenit on a permanent basis and signed a contract until the end of the 2024–25 season, with an option to extend for a year.

On 2 June 2024, Alip scored the winning goal in added time in the 2024 Russian Cup final.

On 7 August 2024, Alip extended his contract with Zenit until the summer of 2028.

== International career ==
=== Youth ===
Alip previously played with Kazakhstan's U-19 and under-21 teams.

=== Senior ===
Alip made his debut with the Kazakhstan national team on 26 March 2018 in a friendly match against Bulgaria which ended with a 2–1 win in favour of the Bulgarian combined after the goals of Ivelin Popov and Nikolay Bodurov for Bulgaria, and Yerkebulan Tungyshbayev for Kazakhstan.

== Career statistics ==
=== Club ===
As of match played 21 November 2026

Appearances and goals by club, season and competition
Club	Season	League			National cup (Note: Includes Kazakhstan Cup, Russian Cup)		Continental		Other		Total	
Club	Season	Division	Apps	Goals	Apps	Goals	Apps	Goals	Apps	Goals	Apps	Goals
Kairat	2018	Kazakhstan Premier League	15	0	4	0	2 (Note: Appearances in UEFA Europa League)	0	0	0	21	0
Kairat	2019	Kazakhstan Premier League	20	0	1	0	0	0	0	0	21	0
Kairat	2020	Kazakhstan Premier League	14	4	0	0	2	0	–		16	4
Kairat	2021	Kazakhstan Premier League	25	0	6	0	13 (Note: Four appearances and one goal in UEFA Champions League, two appearances in UEFA Europa League, seven appearances in UEFA Europa Conference League)	1	1 (Note: Appearance in Kazakhstan Super Cup)	0	45	1
Kairat	Total		74	4	11	0	17	1	1	0	103	5
Zenit Saint Petersburg (loan)	2021–22	Russian Premier League	10	0	2	0	–		0	0	12	0
Zenit Saint Petersburg (loan)	2022–23	Russian Premier League	4	0	3	0	–		1 (Note: Appearance in Russian Super Cup)	0	8	0
Zenit Saint Petersburg (loan)	Total		14	0	5	0	0	0	1	0	20	0
Zenit Saint Petersburg	2022–23	Russian Premier League	4	0	1	0	–		0	0	5	0
Zenit Saint Petersburg	2023–24	Russian Premier League	25	0	12	1	–		0	0	37	1
Zenit Saint Petersburg	2024–25	Russian Premier League	19	1	9	0	–		1	0	29	1
Zenit Saint Petersburg	2025–26	Russian Premier League	16	1	11	0	–		–		27	1
Zenit Saint Petersburg	2026–27	Russian Premier League	11	0	3	0	–		–		14	0
Zenit Saint Petersburg	Total		76	2	36	1	–		1	0	113	3
Zenit Saint Petersburg	Club total		90	2	41	1	–		2	0	133	3
Career total			164	6	52	1	17	1	3	0	236	8

=== International ===
As of match played 16 November 2026

Kazakhstan
Year	Apps	Goals
2018	1	0
2020	5	0
2021	6	0
2022	10	0
2023	8	0
2024	8	0
2025	10	0
2026	11	2
Total	59	2

Scores and results list Kazakhstan's goal tally first, score column indicates score after each Alip goal.

List of international goals scored by Nuraly Alip
No.	Date	Venue	Cap	Opponent	Score	Result	Competition
1	2 October 2026	Astana Arena, Astana, Kazakhstan	55	Moldova	1–2	1–2	2026–27 UEFA Nations League C
2	6 October 2026	Astana Arena, Astana, Kazakhstan	56	Faroe Islands	2–2	2–2	2026–27 UEFA Nations League C

== Honours ==
Kairat

- Kazakhstan Premier League: 2020
- Kazakhstan Cup: 2018, 2021
- Kazakhstan Super Cup runner-up: 2018, 2019

Zenit Saint Petersburg

- Russian Premier League: 2021–22, 2022–23, 2023–24, 2025–26
- Russian Cup: 2023–24
- Russian Super Cup: 2022, 2024, 2026
