= Nino (footballer, born 1997) =

Brazilian footballer

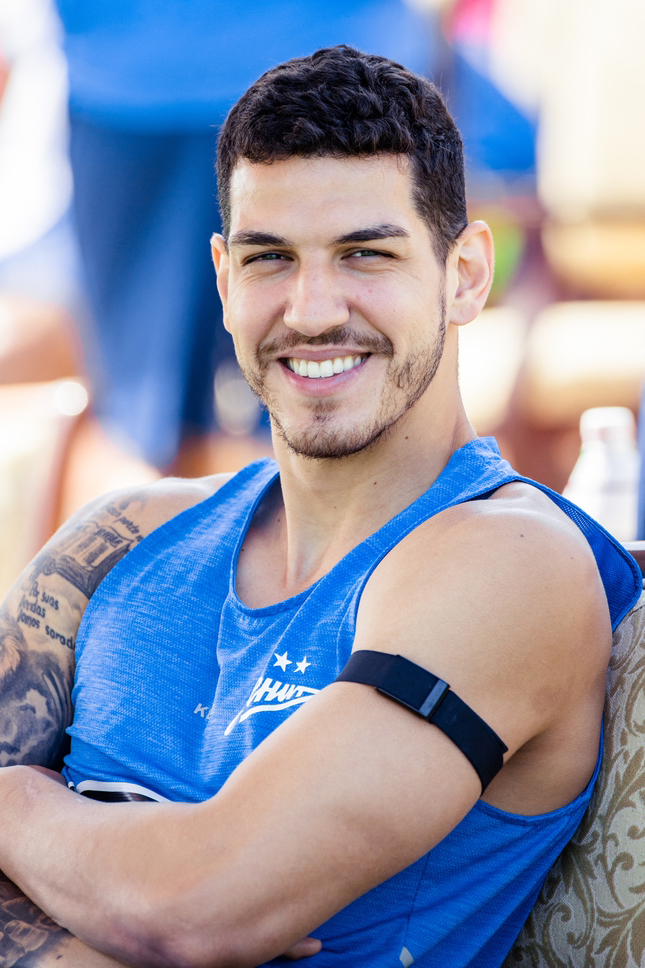
- Nino in 2025

Personal information
- Full name: Marcilio Florencio Mota Filho
- Date of birth: 10 April 1997 (age 29)
- Place of birth: Recife, Brazil
- Height: 1.88 m (6 ft 2 in)
- Position: Centre-back

Team information
- Current team: Zenit Saint Petersburg
- Number: 33

Youth career
- Sport Recife
- Criciúma

Senior career*
Years	Team	Apps	(Gls)
2016–2019	Criciúma	78	(1)
2019	→ Fluminense (loan)	38	(1)
2020–2023	Fluminense	138	(8)
2024–	Zenit Saint Petersburg	81	(3)

International career^{‡}
2020–2021	Brazil U23	6	(0)
2023–	Brazil	1	(0)
Medal record
Men's football
Representing Brazil
Olympic Games
Gold medal – first place	2020 Tokyo	Team
- * Club domestic league appearances and goals as of 21 November 2026 ‡ National team caps and goals as of 14:49, 22 November 2023 (UTC)

Marcilio Florencio Mota Filho, commonly known as Nino, (born 10 April 1997) is a Brazilian professional footballer who plays as a centre-back for Russian Premier League club Zenit Saint Petersburg and the Brazil national team.

== Club career ==
Nino is a product of the Sport Recife and Criciúma youth systems. On 18 February 2016, in a Campeonato Catarinense match against Camboriú, he made his debut for the main squad of the latter. On 20 May 2017, in a match against Oeste, he made his debut in the Campeonato Brasileiro Série B. On 17 June 2018, in a match against Oeste, he scored his first goal for Criciúma. At the beginning of 2019, Nino moved to Fluminense on a loan deal. On 29 April, in a match against Goiás, he made his debut in the Campeonato Brasileiro Série A. On 18 May, in a match against Cruzeiro, Nino scored his first goal for Fluminense. At the end of the loan spell, the club exercised the option to purchase his transfer for 1.1 million euros. In 2023, he helped the club win the Copa Libertadores but would later score an own goal in the 2023 FIFA Club World Cup final against Manchester City F.C.

On 4 January 2024, Nino joined Russian Premier League club Zenit Saint Petersburg on a four-and-a-half-year contract for a fee reported to be around €5 million.

On 2 June 2024, Nino scored a late equalizer in the 2024 Russian Cup final which Zenit eventually won in added time.

== International career ==
On 17 June 2021, Nino was named in the Brazilian squad for the 2020 Summer Olympics.

In August 2023, he received his first call-up to the Brazil national team by interim head coach Fernando Diniz, for two 2026 FIFA World Cup qualification matches against Bolivia and Peru. He made his debut on 21 November 2023 in a World Cup qualifier 0–1 home loss against Argentina, he substituted Marquinhos at half-time. That was Brazil's first home loss in World Cup qualifiers in history.

== Career statistics ==
As of match played 21 November 2026

Appearances and goals by club, season and competition
Club	Season	League			State League		Cup		Continental		Other		Total	
Club	Season	Division	Apps	Goals	Apps	Goals	Apps	Goals	Apps	Goals	Apps	Goals	Apps	Goals
Criciúma	2016	Série B	0	0	2	0	0	0	—		1 (Note: Appearance(s) in Primeira Liga)	0	3	0
Criciúma	2017	Série B	24	0	3	0	0	0	—		2	0	29	0
Criciúma	2018	Série B	29	1	15	0	2	0	—		—		46	1
Criciúma	2019	Série B	0	0	5	0	0	0	—		—		5	0
Criciúma	Total		53	1	25	0	2	0	0	0	3	0	83	1
Fluminense	2019	Série A	36	1	2	0	6	0	6 (Note: Appearance(s) in Copa Sudamericana)	0	—		50	1
Fluminense	2020	Série A	26	3	8	0	6	1	0	0	—		40	4
Fluminense	2021	Série A	25	2	9	1	2	0	8 (Note: Appearance(s) in Copa Libertadores)	0	—		44	3
Fluminense	2022	Série A	30	0	7	0	8	0	8	0	—		53	0
Fluminense	2023	Série A	26	2	13	1	4	1	11	1	—		54	5
Fluminense	Total		143	8	39	2	26	2	33	1	0	0	241	13
Zenit Saint Petersburg	2023–24	Russian Premier League	12	0	—		4	1	—		—		16	1
Zenit Saint Petersburg	2024–25	Russian Premier League	30	2	—		5	0	—		0	0	35	2
Zenit Saint Petersburg	2025–26	Russian Premier League	27	1	—		5	0	—		—		32	1
Zenit Saint Petersburg	2026–27	Russian Premier League	12	0	—		3	0	—		1 (Note: Appearance in Russian Super Cup)	0	16	0
Zenit Saint Petersburg	Total		81	3	0	0	17	1	0	0	1	0	99	4
Career total			277	12	64	2	45	3	33	1	4	0	423	18

== Honours ==
Fluminense

- Taça Rio: 2020
- Taça Guanabara: 2022, 2023
- Campeonato Carioca: 2022, 2023
- Copa Libertadores: 2023

Zenit Saint Petersburg

- Russian Premier League: 2023–24, 2025–26
- Russian Cup: 2023–24
- Russian Super Cup: 2026

Brazil Olympic

- Summer Olympics: 2020

Individual

- Campeonato Carioca Team of the Year: 2021, 2022, 2023
- Copa Libertadores Team of the Tournament: 2023
- South America Team of the Year: 2023
- Russian Premier League Team of the Season: 2025–26
