= Luciano Gondou =

Argentine association football player

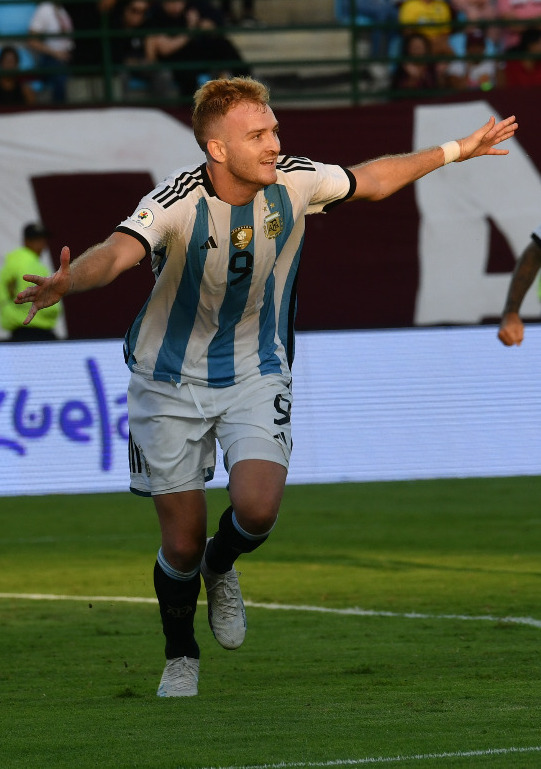
- Gondou in 2024

Personal information
- Full name: Luciano Emilio Gondou Zanelli
- Date of birth: 22 June 2001 (age 25)
- Place of birth: Rufino, Santa Fe, Argentina
- Height: 1.89 m (6 ft 2 in)
- Position: Forward

Team information
- Current team: CSKA Moscow
- Number: 32

Youth career
- –2019: Sarmiento
- 2019–2021: River Plate

Senior career*
Years	Team	Apps	(Gls)
2021–2023	Sarmiento	82	(17)
2023–2024	Argentinos Juniors	39	(12)
2024–2025	Zenit Saint Petersburg	37	(10)
2026–	CSKA Moscow	23	(4)

International career^{‡}
2023–2024	Argentina U23	19	(6)
- * Club domestic league appearances and goals as of 21 November 2026 ‡ National team caps and goals as of 6 October 2024

Luciano Emilio Gondou Zanelli (born 22 June 2001) is an Argentine professional footballer who plays as an striker for the Russian Premier League club CSKA Moscow.

== Club career ==
Born in Rufino, Santa Fe, Gondou was in the youth academy at Sarmiento before joining River Plate in 2019. He started his career as a left-sided midfielder before developing into a left-footed forward player. With River Plate, he reached the final of the 2020 U-20 Copa Libertadores, which they lost to Ecuadorean side Independiente del Valle. In March 2021, he returned to Sarmiento and signed a professional contract with the club. The following month he made his senior debut.

In July 2023, Gondou signed for Argentinos Juniors agreeing to a four-year contract with Argentinos Juniors reportedly paying a fee of $3,500,000 for 80% of his playing rights. He made his debut in the Copa Libertadores against Fluminense in August 2023. He scored his first goals for Argentinos Juniors on 21 August 2023, against his former club River Plate, scoring a brace as his side completed a comeback 3–2 league win.

On 27 August 2024, Gondou signed a four-year contract with Russian Premier League champions Zenit St. Petersburg. Four days later on his debut against Pari NN he scored twice in a 3–0 Zenit away victory.

On 11 January 2026, Gondou moved to CSKA Moscow on a four-and-a-half-year contract. On 7 April 2026, he scored a hat-trick in a Russian Cup Regions Path semi-final against Krylia Sovetov Samara.

== International career ==
In November 2023, Gondou was called up to the Argentina national under-23 football team by coach Javier Mascherano. In January 2024, he scored in his first two appearances for Argentina U23, against Paraguay U23 and Peru U23. He also scored the only goal of the game as Argentina beat Brazil U23 to secure qualification for the 2024 Olympic Games.

In June 2024, he was named in the provisional Argentina squad for the 2024 Paris Olympics.

== Career statistics ==
As of match played 21 November 2026

Appearances and goals by club, season and competition
Club	Season	League			National cup (Note: Includes Copa Argentina, Russian Cup)		Continental		Total	
Club	Season	Division	Apps	Goals	Apps	Goals	Apps	Goals	Apps	Goals
Sarmiento	2020	Primera Nacional	0	0	1	0	—		1	0
Sarmiento	2021	Argentine Primera División	26	6	1	0	—		27	6
Sarmiento	2022	Argentine Primera División	34	5	1	0	—		35	5
Sarmiento	2023	Argentine Primera División	22	6	1	0	—		23	6
Sarmiento	Total		82	17	4	0	—		86	17
Argentinos Juniors	2023	Argentine Primera División	14	9	1	0	2 (Note: Appearances in Copa Libertadores)	0	17	9
Argentinos Juniors	2024	Argentine Primera División	16	3	2	1	3 (Note: Appearances in Copa Sudamericana)	1	21	5
Argentinos Juniors	Total		30	12	3	1	5	1	38	14
Zenit Saint Petersburg	2024–25	Russian Premier League	23	10	6	1	—		29	11
Zenit Saint Petersburg	2025–26	Russian Premier League	14	0	7	2	—		21	2
Zenit Saint Petersburg	Total		37	10	13	3	0	0	50	13
CSKA Moscow	2025–26	Russian Premier League	9	1	4	3	—		13	4
CSKA Moscow	2026–27	Russian Premier League	14	3	3	0	—		17	3
CSKA Moscow	Total		23	4	7	3	0	0	30	7
Career total			172	43	27	7	5	1	204	51

== Honours ==
Sarmiento

- Primera Nacional: 2020

Zenit Saint Petersburg

- Russian Premier League: 2025–26
