= Vyacheslav Karavayev =

Russian footballer (born 1995)

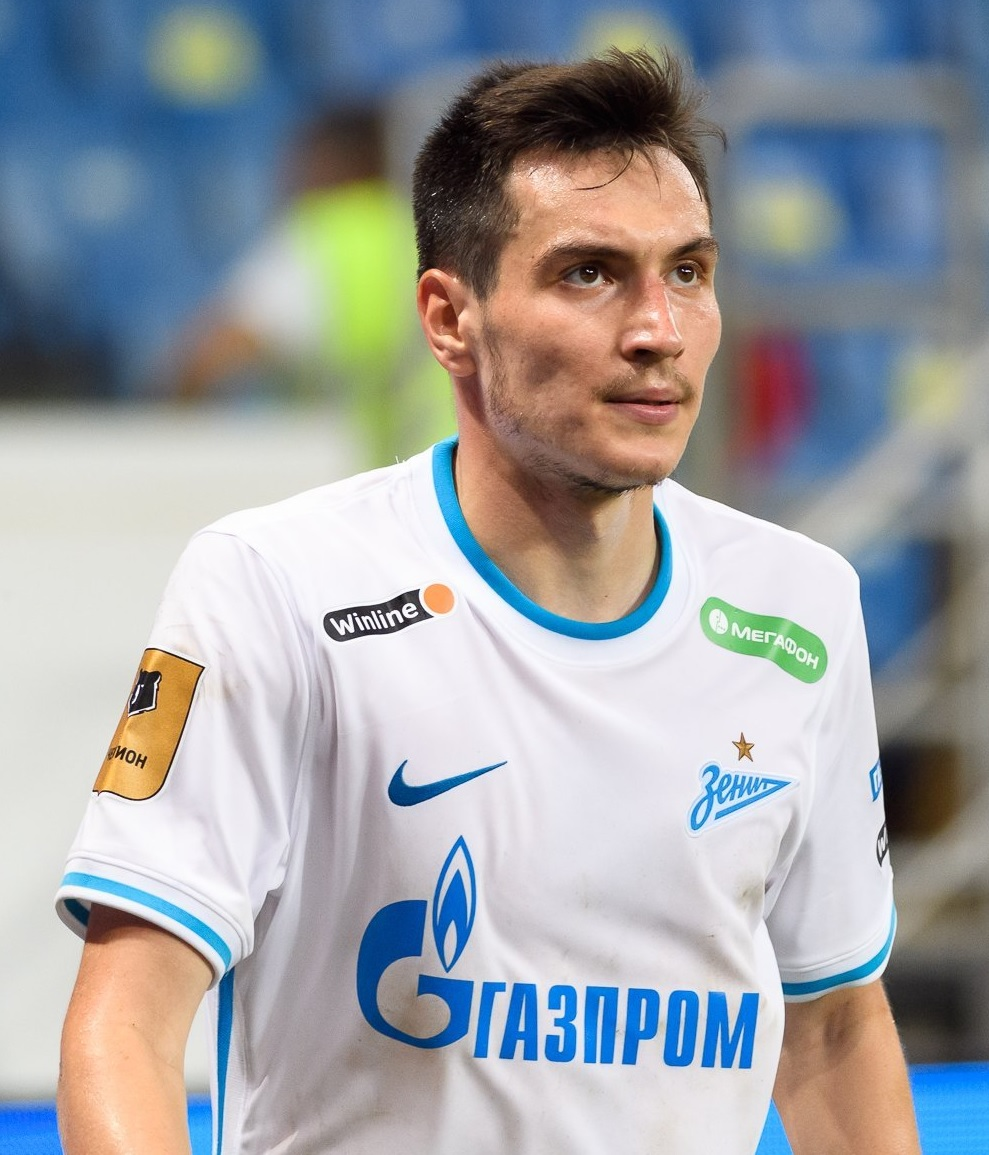
- Karavayev with Zenit St. Petersburg in 2021

Personal information
- Full name: Vyacheslav Sergeyevich Karavayev
- Date of birth: 20 May 1995 (age 31)
- Place of birth: Moscow, Russia
- Height: 1.75 m (5 ft 9 in)
- Position: Right-back

Team information
- Current team: Zenit Saint Petersburg
- Number: 15

Youth career
- 2001–2014: CSKA Moscow

Senior career*
Years	Team	Apps	(Gls)
2013–2016	CSKA Moscow	2	(0)
2014–2015	→ Dukla Prague (loan)	29	(0)
2015–2016	→ Jablonec (loan)	29	(3)
2016–2018	Sparta Prague	30	(3)
2018–2019	Vitesse	49	(2)
2019–	Zenit Saint Petersburg	127	(4)

International career^{‡}
2010–2011	Russia U17	8	(0)
2011–2012	Russia U19	9	(0)
2014–2016	Russia U21	20	(1)
2019–	Russia	26	(2)
- * Club domestic league appearances and goals as of 16 September 2026 ‡ National team caps and goals as of 15 November 2024

Vyacheslav Sergeyevich Karavayev (Russian: Вячеслав Сергеевич Караваев; born 20 May 1995) is a Russian professional footballer who plays as a right back for Russian Premier League club Zenit St. Petersburg and the Russia national team.

== Club career ==
Karavayev made his debut in the Russian Premier League for CSKA Moscow on 2 December 2013 in a game against FC Rostov.

Karavayev joined Dukla Prague of the Czech First League on a season-long loan deal during the summer of 2014.

On 16 August 2016, he returned to the Czech Republic, signing on the permanent basis with AC Sparta Prague.

On 31 January 2018, he signed a 3.5-year contract with Eredivisie club Vitesse who paid €2.5 million for him.

On 2 September 2019, he signed a 4-year contract with the Russian Premier League champion Zenit St. Petersburg. On 4 April 2023, Karavayev extended his contract with Zenit until the end of the 2025–26 season, with an option for another season. In January 2025, Karavayev suffered an Achilles tendon rupture and was expected to be out of play for 7 months. He made his first appearance after recovering in March 2026. Zenit extended Karavayev's contract for two years (with an optional third year) on 9 June 2026.

== International ==
On 11 March 2019, he was called up to the Russia national football team for the Euro 2020 qualifiers against Belgium on 21 March 2019 and Kazakhstan on 24 March 2019. He made his debut on 13 October 2019 in a Euro 2020 qualifier against Cyprus. He substituted Sergei Petrov in the 38th minute due to an injury to Petrov.

On 3 September 2020 he scored his first goal for Russia national team against Serbia in 2020–21 UEFA Nations League B.

On 11 May 2021, he was included in the preliminary extended 30-man squad for UEFA Euro 2020. On 2 June 2021, he was included in the final squad. In Russia's opening game against Belgium on 12 June 2021, he substituted injured Yuri Zhirkov late in the first half, as Russia lost 0–3. In the second game against Finland on 16 June, he once again had to come on as a first-half substitute for an injured teammate, this time Mário Fernandes, Russia won the game 1–0. He appeared as a second-half substitute on 21 June in the last group game against Denmark as Russia lost 1–4 and was eliminated.

== Career statistics ==
=== Club ===
As of match played 29 October 2026

Appearances and goals by club, season and competition
Club	Season	League			Cup		Europe		Other		Total	
Club	Season	Division	Apps	Goals	Apps	Goals	Apps	Goals	Apps	Goals	Apps	Goals
CSKA Moscow	2013–14	Russian Premier League	2	0	1	0	1	0	0	0	4	0
Dukla Prague (loan)	2014–15	Czech First League	29	0	0	0	—		—		29	0
Jablonec (loan)	2015–16	Czech First League	29	3	7	0	4	0	—		40	3
Sparta Prague	2016–17	Czech First League	27	3	1	0	9	1	—		37	4
Sparta Prague	2017–18	Czech First League	3	0	2	0	2	0	—		7	0
Sparta Prague	Total		30	3	3	0	11	1	—		44	4
Vitesse U21	2017–18	Derde Divisie	1	1	—		—		—		1	1
Vitesse	2017–18	Eredivisie	11	0	—		—		4 (Note: Appearances in the Eredivisie Europa League play-offs)	0	15	0
Vitesse	2018–19	Eredivisie	33	1	4	0	4	0	4	0	45	1
Vitesse	2019–20	Eredivisie	5	1	—		—		—		5	1
Vitesse	Total		49	2	4	0	4	0	8	0	65	2
Zenit St. Petersburg	2019–20	Russian Premier League	20	1	5	0	6	0	—		31	1
Zenit St. Petersburg	2020–21	Russian Premier League	25	3	1	0	4	0	1 (Note: Appearance in the Russian Super Cup)	0	31	3
Zenit St. Petersburg	2021–22	Russian Premier League	17	0	1	0	5	0	1	0	24	0
Zenit St. Petersburg	2022–23	Russian Premier League	24	0	6	0	—		—		30	0
Zenit St. Petersburg	2023–24	Russian Premier League	23	0	7	0	—		1	0	31	0
Zenit St. Petersburg	2024–25	Russian Premier League	12	0	5	0	—		1	0	18	0
Zenit St. Petersburg	2025–26	Russian Premier League	2	0	1	0	—		—		3	0
Zenit St. Petersburg	2026–27	Russian Premier League	4	0	5	0	—		—		9	0
Zenit St. Petersburg	Total		127	4	31	0	15	0	4	0	177	4
Career total			267	13	46	0	35	1	12	0	360	14

=== International ===
As of match played 15 November 2024

Appearances and goals by national team and year
National team	Year	Apps	Goals
Russia	2019	1	0
Russia	2020	8	1
Russia	2021	11	1
Russia	2022	2	0
Russia	2023	2	0
Russia	2024	2	0
Total		26	2

=== International goals ===
Scores and results list Russia's goal tally first.

No.	Date	Venue	Opponent	Score	Result	Competition
1.	3 September 2020	VTB Arena, Moscow, Russia	Serbia	2–0	3–1	2020–21 UEFA Nations League B
2.	1 June 2021	Stadion Miejski, Wrocław, Poland	Poland	1–1	1–1	Friendly

== Honours ==
=== Club ===
CSKA Moscow

- Russian Premier League: 2013–14

Zenit Saint Petersburg

- Russian Premier League: 2019–20, 2020–21, 2021–22, 2022–23, 2023–24, 2025–26
- Russian Cup: 2019–20, 2023–24
- Russian Super Cup: 2020, 2021, 2023, 2024, 2026
