= Wilmar Barrios =

Colombian footballer (born 1993)

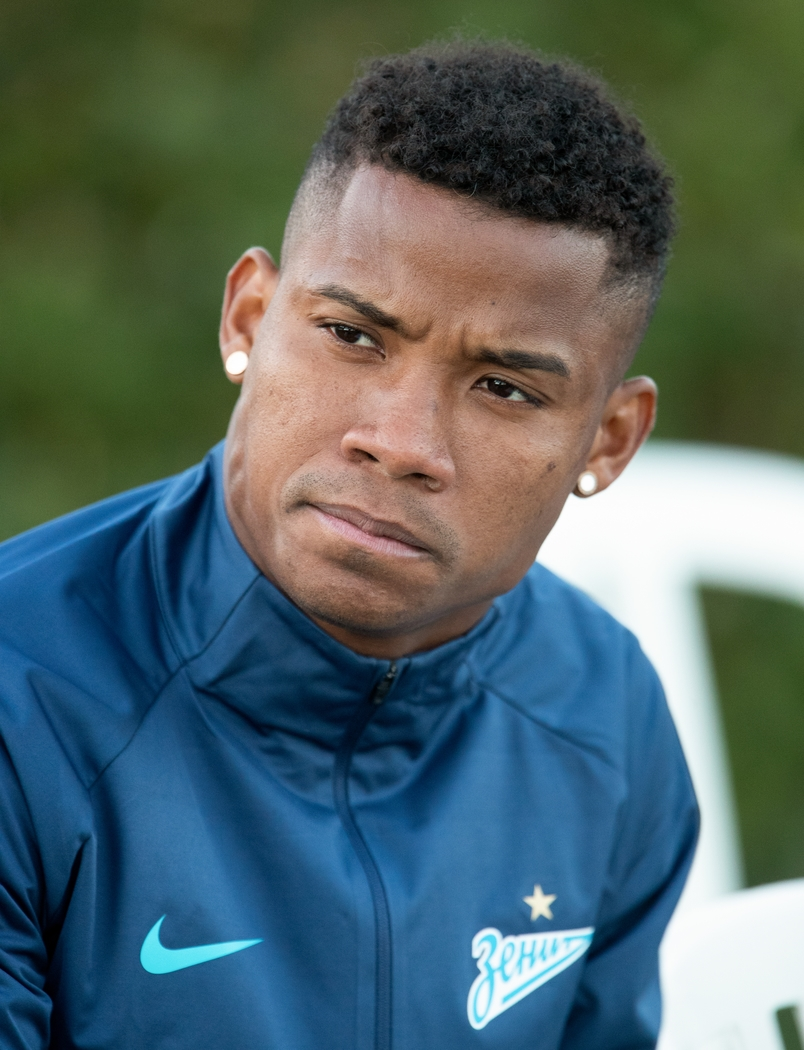
- Barrios with Zenit Saint Petersburg in 2019

Personal information
- Full name: Wilmar Enrique Barrios Terán
- Date of birth: 16 October 1993 (age 33)
- Place of birth: Cartagena, Colombia
- Height: 1.78 m (5 ft 10 in)
- Position: Defensive midfielder

Team information
- Current team: Zenit Saint Petersburg
- Number: 5

Senior career*
Years	Team	Apps	(Gls)
2013–2016	Deportes Tolima	102	(3)
2016–2018	Boca Juniors	48	(1)
2019–	Zenit Saint Petersburg	219	(3)

International career^{‡}
2016	Colombia Olympic	9	(0)
2016–2023	Colombia	57	(1)
Medal record
Representing Colombia
Men's football
Copa América
Third place	2021 Brazil
- * Club domestic league appearances and goals as of 21 November 2026 ‡ National team caps and goals as of 17 October 2023

Wilmar Enrique Barrios Terán (born 16 October 1993) is a Colombian professional footballer who plays as a defensive midfielder for Russian Premier League club Zenit Saint Petersburg and the Colombia national team.

Born in Cartagena, Colombia, Barrios relocated to Ibagué where he made professional football debut with Deportes Tolima. During his time with Tolima, Barrios notably won the Copa Colombia in 2014. In 2016, he was acquired by Argentine giants Boca Juniors. Barrios won two trophies with the Xeneizes: the Primera División in 2017 and 2018. In 2019, he joined Russian Premier League side FC Zenit Saint Petersburg on an initial 4,5-year contract; in 2021, his contract was extended until 2026. Since his arrival to the club, Barrios has won six trophies with Zenit, including four league titles, the Russian Cup and the Russian Super Cup.

Before debuting with Colombia in 2016, Barrios represented his country's Olympic team at the 2016 Summer Olympics. Since then, he has earned over 50 caps. Barrios was part of the Colombia squad that took part in the 2018 World Cup. Additionally, Barrios represented Colombia at the 2019 and 2021 editions of the Copa América, achieving a third-place finish in the latter.

== Club career ==
Barrios was given a red card for two bookable offences during the second leg of the 2018 Copa Libertadores Finals against rivals River Plate held at the Santiago Bernabéu Stadium.

On 1 February 2019, he signed a 4,5-year contract with Zenit Saint Petersburg. On 19 October 2021, Barrios extended his contract with Zenit until the end of the 2025–26 season. On 31 August 2023, he extended his contract with Zenit until June 2027.

== International career ==
Barrios was named in Colombia's provisional squad for Copa América Centenario, but was cut from the final squad.

In May 2018, he was named in Colombia's final 23-man squad for the 2018 World Cup in Russia.

On 27 September 2022, Barrios scored his first goal for Colombia, the winning goal in a 3–2 friendly win against Mexico.

== Career statistics ==
=== Club ===
As of match played 21 November 2026

Appearances and goals by club, season and competition
Club	Season	League			Cup		Continental		Other		Total	
Club	Season	Division	Apps	Goals	Apps	Goals	Apps	Goals	Apps	Goals	Apps	Goals
Deportes Tolima	2013	Categoría Primera A	11	0	12	0	—		—		23	0
Deportes Tolima	2014	Categoría Primera A	36	0	13	1	0	0	—		49	1
Deportes Tolima	2015	Categoría Primera A	37	3	8	0	4	0	—		49	3
Deportes Tolima	2016	Categoría Primera A	18	0	5	1	0	0	—		23	1
Deportes Tolima	Total		102	3	38	2	4	0	—		144	5
Boca Juniors	2016–17	Argentine Primera División	19	0	1	0	0	0	0	0	20	0
Boca Juniors	2017–18	Argentine Primera División	23	1	3	0	4	0	1 (Note: Appearance in Supercopa Argentina)	0	31	1
Boca Juniors	2018–19	Argentine Primera División	6	0	2	0	8	0	0	0	16	0
Boca Juniors	Total		48	1	6	0	12	0	1	0	67	1
Zenit Saint Petersburg	2018–19	Russian Premier League	10	1	—		4	0	—		14	1
Zenit Saint Petersburg	2019–20	Russian Premier League	26	1	3	0	6	0	—		35	1
Zenit Saint Petersburg	2020–21	Russian Premier League	26	0	0	0	6	0	1 (Note: Appearance in Russian Super Cup)	0	33	0
Zenit Saint Petersburg	2021–22	Russian Premier League	27	0	2	0	8	0	0	0	37	0
Zenit Saint Petersburg	2022–23	Russian Premier League	28	1	2	0	—		1	0	31	1
Zenit Saint Petersburg	2023–24	Russian Premier League	29	0	9	0	—		1	0	39	0
Zenit Saint Petersburg	2024–25	Russian Premier League	28	0	7	0	—		1	0	36	0
Zenit Saint Petersburg	2025–26	Russian Premier League	30	0	5	0	—		—		35	0
Zenit Saint Petersburg	2026–27	Russian Premier League	15	0	1	0	—		1	0	17	0
Zenit Saint Petersburg	Total		219	3	29	0	24	0	5	0	277	3
Career total			369	7	73	2	40	0	6	0	488	9

=== International ===
Colombia
Year	Apps	Goals
2016	3	0
2017	5	0
2018	9	0
2019	12	0
2020	4	0
2021	16	0
2022	4	1
2023	4	0
Total	57	1

Scores and results list Colombia's goal tally first, score column indicates score after each Barrios goal.

List of international goals scored by Wilmar Barrios
No.	Date	Venue	Opponent	Score	Result	Competition
1	27 September 2022	Levi's Stadium, Santa Clara, United States	Mexico	3–2	3–2	Friendly

== Honours ==
Deportes Tolima

- Copa Colombia: 2014

Boca Juniors

- Argentine Primera División: 2016–17, 2017–18

Zenit Saint Petersburg

- Russian Premier League: 2018–19, 2019–20, 2020–21, 2021–22, 2022–23, 2023–24, 2025–26
- Russian Cup: 2019–20, 2023–24
- Russian Super Cup: 2020, 2022, 2023, 2024, 2026

Individual

- Superliga Colombiana Team of the Year: 2015
- Copa Libertadores Team of the Tournament: 2018
- Russian Premier League Defensive Midfielder of the Season: 2019–20
