= Sergei Volkov (footballer, born 2002) =

Russian footballer

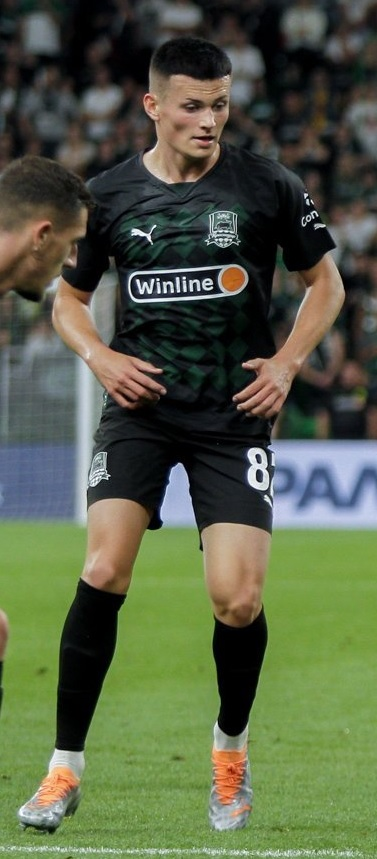
- Volkov with Krasnodar in 2022

Personal information
- Full name: Sergei Yevgenyevich Volkov
- Date of birth: 9 September 2002 (age 24)
- Place of birth: Chita, Russia
- Height: 1.82 m (6 ft 0 in)
- Position: Right-back

Team information
- Current team: Zenit Saint Petersburg
- Number: 82

Youth career
- Krasnodar

Senior career*
Years	Team	Apps	(Gls)
2018–2019	Krasnodar-3	11	(0)
2021–2022	Krasnodar-2	25	(1)
2021–2024	Krasnodar	53	(2)
2024–	Zenit Saint Petersburg	4	(0)
2025	→ Zenit-2 Saint Petersburg	2	(0)
2025–2026	→ Sochi (loan)	21	(0)

International career^{‡}
2017–2018	Russia U-16	14	(2)
2018	Russia U-17	4	(0)
2022	Russia U-21	3	(0)
2023–	Russia	3	(0)
- * Club domestic league appearances and goals as of 5 September 2026 ‡ National team caps and goals as of 21 March 2024

Sergei Yevgenyevich Volkov (Russian: Сергей Евгеньевич Волков; born 9 September 2002) is a Russian football player who plays as a right-back for Zenit Saint Petersburg and the Russia national team.

== Club career ==
He made his debut in the Russian Football National League for Krasnodar-2 on 10 July 2021 in a game against Spartak-2 Moscow.

He made his Russian Premier League debut for Krasnodar on 9 April 2022 against Rubin Kazan and scored a late winner in a 1–0 away victory.

On 24 June 2024, Volkov joined Zenit Saint Petersburg on a four-year contract with an optional fifth year. In early September 2024, Volkov suffered an ACL tear which would leave him recovering for several months.

On 22 July 2025, Volkov was loaned by Sochi for the 2025–26 season.

== International career ==
Volkov was first called up to the Russia national football team for a training camp in September 2023. He made his debut on 12 September 2023 in a friendly against Qatar.

== Career statistics ==
=== Club ===
As of match played 29 October 2026

Appearances and goals by club, season and competition
Club	Season	League			Cup		Other		Total	
Club	Season	Division	Apps	Goals	Apps	Goals	Apps	Goals	Apps	Goals
Krasnodar-3	2018–19	Russian Second League	4	0	—		—		4	0
Krasnodar-3	2019–20	Russian Second League	7	0	—		—		7	0
Krasnodar-3	Total		11	0	—		—		11	0
Krasnodar-2	2021–22	Russian First League	24	1	—		—		24	1
Krasnodar-2	2022–23	Russian First League	1	0	—		—		1	0
Krasnodar-2	Total		25	1	—		—		25	1
Krasnodar	2021–22	Russian Premier League	4	1	0	0	—		4	1
Krasnodar	2022–23	Russian Premier League	27	1	13	0	—		40	1
Krasnodar	2023–24	Russian Premier League	22	0	7	0	—		29	0
Krasnodar	Total		53	2	20	0	—		73	2
Zenit Saint Petersburg	2024–25	Russian Premier League	3	0	3	0	—		6	0
Zenit Saint Petersburg	2026–27	Russian Premier League	1	0	3	0	1 (Note: Appearance in Russian Super Cup)	0	5	0
Zenit Saint Petersburg	Total		4	0	6	0	1	0	11	0
Zenit-2 Saint Petersburg	2025	Russian Second League B	2	0	—		—		2	0
Sochi (loan)	2025–26	Russian Premier League	21	0	1	0	—		22	0
Career total			116	3	27	0	1	0	144	3

=== International ===
As of match played 21 March 2024

Appearances and goals by national team and year
National team	Year	Apps	Goals
Russia	2023	2	0
Russia	2024	1	0
Total		3	0

== Honours ==
Zenit Saint Petersburg

- Russian Super Cup: 2024, 2026
