= Pedro (footballer, born 2006) =

Brazilian footballer

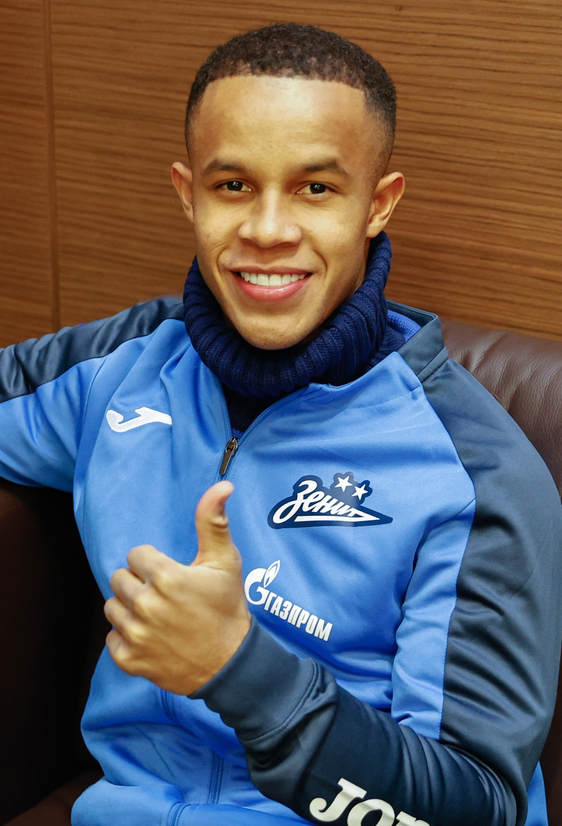
- Pedro with Zenit Saint Petersburg in 2024

Personal information
- Full name: Pedro Henrique Silva dos Santos
- Date of birth: 5 February 2006 (age 20)
- Place of birth: São Paulo, Brazil
- Height: 1.72 m (5 ft 8 in)
- Position: Forward

Team information
- Current team: Zenit Saint Petersburg
- Number: 20

Youth career
- 2015–2022: Corinthians

Senior career*
Years	Team	Apps	(Gls)
2023–2024	Corinthians	16	(1)
2024–	Zenit Saint Petersburg	79	(8)

International career^{‡}
2022	Brazil U16	4	(1)
2022–2023	Brazil U17	4	(2)
2023–	Brazil U20	17	(4)
Medal record
Men's football
Representing Brazil
South American U-20 Championship
Winner	2023 Colombia
Winner	2025 Venezuela
- * Club domestic league appearances and goals as of 21 November 2026 ‡ National team caps and goals as of 16:27, 17 February 2025 (UTC)

Pedro Henrique Silva dos Santos (born 5 February 2006), known as Pedro or Pedrinho, is a Brazilian professional footballer who plays as a forward for Russian Premier League club Zenit Saint Petersburg.

== Club career ==
Pedro joined Corinthians at the age of nine, initially playing for the club's futsal team. He signed his first professional contract with Corinthians in March 2022, keeping him with the club until 2025. In September of the same year, he trained with the club's first team for the first time.

On 29 June 2023, Russian champions FC Zenit Saint Petersburg announced that the agreement was reached with Corinthians for the transfer of Pedro which took effect when Pedro turned 18 years old in February 2024.

On 27 January 2026, Pedro extended his contract with Zenit to June 2030.

== International career ==
Pedro was first called up for the Brazil under-16 team for the 2022 Montaigu Tournament, scoring against Mexico enroute to the final. He was called up to the Brazil under-17 for four friendlies against Chile and Paraguay later in the same year, scoring twice.

== Personal life ==
Pedro is close friends with Real Madrid player Endrick, with the two first meeting at under-11 level, and going on to represent Brazil at youth level together.

== Career statistics ==
As of match played 21 November 2026

Appearances and goals by club, season and competition
Club	Season	League			National cup		Continental		Other		Total	
Club	Season	Division	Apps	Goals	Apps	Goals	Apps	Goals	Apps	Goals	Apps	Goals
Corinthians	2023	Série A	14	1	1	0	4 (Note: Three appearances in Copa Libertadores, one appearance in Copa Sudamericana)	0	2 (Note: Appearance(s) in Campeonato Paulista)	0	21	1
Zenit St. Petersburg	2023–24	Russian Premier League	11	1	5	2	—		—		16	3
Zenit St. Petersburg	2024–25	Russian Premier League	26	5	10	0	—		1 (Note: Appearances in Russian Super Cup)	0	37	5
Zenit St. Petersburg	2025–26	Russian Premier League	28	2	8	1	—		—		36	3
Zenit St. Petersburg	2026–27	Russian Premier League	14	0	1	0	—		1	0	16	0
Zenit St. Petersburg	Total		79	8	24	3	—		2	0	105	11
Career total			93	9	25	3	4	0	4	0	126	12

== Honours ==
Zenit Saint Petersburg

- Russian Premier League: 2023–24, 2025–26
- Russian Cup: 2023–24
- Russian Super Cup: 2024, 2026

Brazil U20

- South American U-20 Championship: 2023, 2025
