= Andrei Mostovoy =

Russian footballer (born 1997)

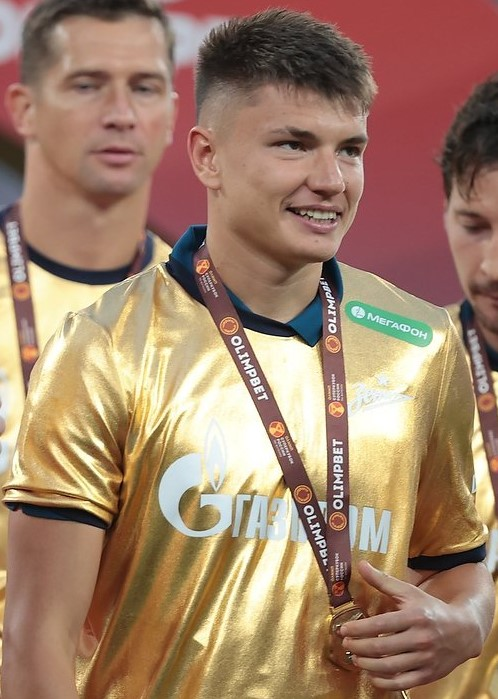
- Mostovoy with Zenit in 2022

Personal information
- Full name: Andrei Andreyevich Mostovoy
- Date of birth: 5 November 1997 (age 29)
- Place of birth: Omsk, Russia
- Height: 1.80 m (5 ft 11 in)
- Position: Winger

Team information
- Current team: Lokomotiv Moscow (on loan from Zenit St. Petersburg)
- Number: 77

Youth career
- 2002–2011: CSKA Moscow
- 2012–2015: Lokomotiv Moscow

Senior career*
Years	Team	Apps	(Gls)
2016	FSK Dolgoprudny	10	(2)
2016–2019	Khimki	83	(4)
2019–	Zenit Saint Petersburg	153	(37)
2019	→ Zenit-2 Saint Petersburg	13	(5)
2019–2020	→ Sochi (loan)	26	(6)
2026–	→ Lokomotiv Moscow (loan)	8	(2)

International career^{‡}
2020–	Russia	20	(3)
- * Club domestic league appearances and goals as of 22 November 2026 ‡ National team caps and goals as of 4 September 2025

Andrei Andreyevich Mostovoy (Russian: Андрей Андреевич Мостовой; born 5 November 1997) is a Russian professional footballer who plays for Lokomotiv Moscow on loan from Zenit Saint Petersburg, and the Russia national team. He mostly plays as a left winger with some appearances as a right winger as well.

== Club career ==
Mostovoy made his debut in the Russian Professional Football League for FSK Dolgoprudny on 10 April 2016 in a game against FC Znamya Truda Orekhovo-Zuyevo and scored a goal on his debut in his team's 2–0 victory.

On 19 July 2019, he joined PFC Sochi on loan for the 2019–20 season.

Upon his return from loan, on 7 August 2020 he made his debut for FC Zenit Saint Petersburg's senior squad, as a substitute in the 2020 Russian Super Cup game, which Zenit won.

On 5 May 2021, he extended his contract with Zenit throughout the 2023–24 season. On 10 October 2023, Mostovoy extended his contract with Zenit once more until June 2027 with an option for the 2027–28 season.

On 4 September 2026, Mostovoy was loaned by Lokomotiv Moscow for the rest of the 2026–27 season.

== International career ==
Mostovoy was called up for the Russia national team for the first time for UEFA Nations League games against Serbia and Hungary in September 2020. He made his debut on 8 October 2020 in a friendly against Sweden.

On 11 May 2021, he was included in the preliminary extended 30-man squad for UEFA Euro 2020. On 2 June 2021, he was included in the final squad. On 11 June 2021, he was removed from the squad after testing positive for COVID-19 and replaced by Roman Yevgenyev.

He scored his first international goal on 11 November 2021 in a World Cup qualifier against Cyprus.

== Career statistics ==
=== Club ===
As of match played 22 November 2026

Appearances and goals by club, season and competition
Club	Season	League			Cup		Continental		Other		Total	
Club	Season	Division	Apps	Goals	Apps	Goals	Apps	Goals	Apps	Goals	Apps	Goals
Dolgoprudny	2015–16	Russian Second League	10	2	—		—		—		10	2
Khimki	2016–17	Russian First League	29	1	2	0	—		—		31	1
Khimki	2017–18	Russian First League	34	3	1	0	—		—		35	3
Khimki	2018–19	Russian First League	20	0	2	0	—		2 (Note: Appearances in the FNL Cup)	0	24	0
Khimki	Total		83	4	5	0	0	0	2	0	90	4
Zenit Saint Petersburg	2019–20	Russian Premier League	0	0	0	0	0	0	0	0	0	0
Zenit Saint Petersburg	2020–21	Russian Premier League	26	6	1	0	5	0	1 (Note: Appearances in the Russian Super Cup)	0	33	6
Zenit Saint Petersburg	2021–22	Russian Premier League	28	5	2	2	7	0	1	0	38	7
Zenit Saint Petersburg	2022–23	Russian Premier League	29	8	6	0	—		1	0	36	8
Zenit Saint Petersburg	2023–24	Russian Premier League	21	3	8	0	—		1	0	30	3
Zenit Saint Petersburg	2024–25	Russian Premier League	26	9	9	2	—		1	0	36	11
Zenit Saint Petersburg	2025–26	Russian Premier League	22	6	9	1	—		—		31	7
Zenit Saint Petersburg	2026–27	Russian Premier League	1	0	1	0	—		1	0	3	0
Zenit Saint Petersburg	Total		153	37	36	5	12	0	6	0	207	42
Zenit-2 Saint Petersburg	2018–19	Russian First League	13	5	—		—		—		13	5
Sochi (loan)	2019–20	Russian Premier League	26	6	1	0	—		—		27	6
Lokomotiv Moscow (loan)	2026–27	Russian Premier League	8	2	1	0	—		—		9	2
Career total			293	56	43	5	12	0	8	0	356	61

=== International ===
As of match played 4 September 2025

Appearances and goals by national team and year
National team	Year	Apps	Goals
Russia	2020	5	0
Russia	2021	5	1
Russia	2022	3	0
Russia	2023	1	1
Russia	2024	2	1
Russia	2025	4	0
Total		20	3

==== International goals ====
Scores and results list Russia's goal tally first.

No.	Date	Venue	Opponent	Score	Result	Competition
1.	11 November 2021	Krestovsky Stadium, Saint Petersburg, Russia	Cyprus	3–0	6–0	2022 FIFA World Cup qualification
2.	20 November 2023	Volgograd Arena, Volgograd, Russia	Cuba	8–0	8–0	Friendly
3.	15 November 2024	Krasnodar Stadium, Krasnodar, Russia	Brunei	8–0	11–0	Friendly

== Honours ==
=== Club ===
Zenit Saint Petersburg

- Russian Premier League: 2020–21, 2021–22, 2022–23, 2023–24, 2025–26
- Russian Cup: 2023–24
- Russian Super Cup: 2020, 2021, 2022, 2023, 2024, 2026
