= Denis Adamov =

Russian footballer (born 1998)

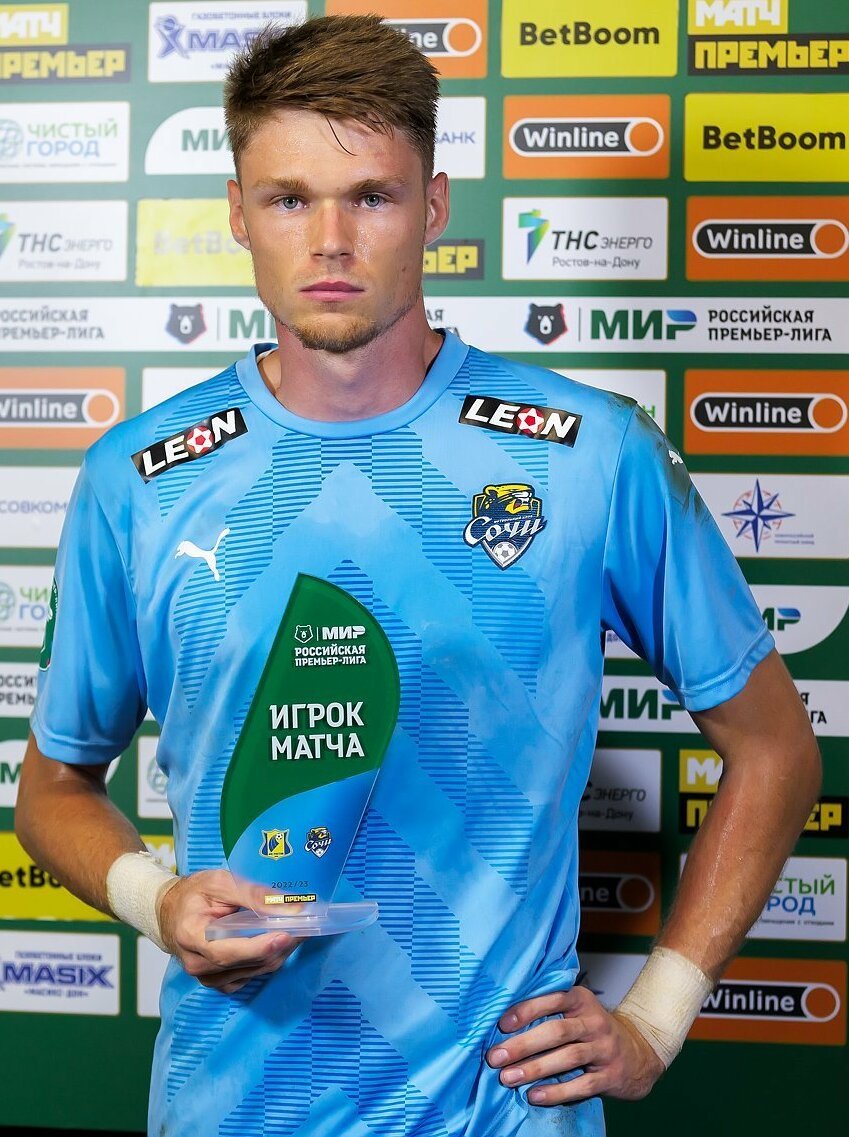
- Adamov with PFC Sochi in 2022

Personal information
- Full name: Denis Andreyevich Adamov
- Date of birth: 20 February 1998 (age 28)
- Place of birth: Ulyanovsk, Russia
- Height: 1.96 m (6 ft 5 in)
- Position: Goalkeeper

Team information
- Current team: Zenit Saint Petersburg
- Number: 16

Youth career
- 2010–2018: Krasnodar

Senior career*
Years	Team	Apps	(Gls)
2015–2020	Krasnodar-2	88	(0)
2016–2021	Krasnodar	2	(0)
2018–2019	Krasnodar-3	3	(1)
2021–2023	Sochi	28	(0)
2023–	Zenit Saint Petersburg	50	(0)

International career^{‡}
2015	Russia U17	1	(0)
2015–2016	Russia U18	9	(0)
2016	Russia U19	2	(0)
2026–	Russia	1	(0)
- * Club domestic league appearances and goals as of 18 October 2026 ‡ National team caps and goals as of 9 June 2026

Denis Andreyevich Adamov (Russian: Дени́с Андре́евич Ада́мов; born 20 February 1998) is a Russian professional footballer who plays as a goalkeeper for Zenit Saint Petersburg and the Russia national team.

== Club career ==
Adamov made his debut in the Russian Professional Football League for Krasnodar-2 on 17 May 2016 in a game against MITOS Novocherkassk.

He made his debut for the main squad of Krasnodar on 20 September 2017 in a Russian Cup game against Tom Tomsk.

Adamov made his Russian Football National League debut for Krasnodar-2 on 8 September 2018 in a game against Avangard Kursk.

On 4 October 2019, in a PFL game of Krasnodar-3 against Inter Cherkessk Adamov scored a winning goal with a header after a corner kick, deep into added time to establish the final score of 3–2.

He made his Russian Premier League debut for Krasnodar on 19 July 2020 in a game against Dynamo Moscow, as a substitute in the 20th minute after Matvei Safonov was sent off.

On 25 January 2021, Adamov signed with Sochi.

On 25 July 2023, Adamov signed a four-year contract with Zenit Saint Petersburg, with the option for another year.

== International career ==
He was on the roster for the Russia national under-17 football team at the 2015 UEFA European Under-17 Championship and the 2015 FIFA U-17 World Cup, but did not play in any games at either tournament behind the first-choice goalkeeper Aleksandr Maksimenko.

Adamov was first called up to the senior Russia national football team for friendlies against Jordan and Qatar in September 2025.

He made his debut on 9 June 2026 in a friendly against Trinidad and Tobago.

== Honours ==
Zenit Saint Petersburg

- Russian Premier League: 2023–24, 2025–26.
- Russian Cup: 2023–24
- Russian Super Cup: 2024, 2026

== Career statistics ==
=== Club ===
As of match played 29 October 2026

Appearances and goals by club, season and competition
Club	Season	League			Cup		Europe		Other		Total	
Club	Season	Division	Apps	Goals	Apps	Goals	Apps	Goals	Apps	Goals	Apps	Goals
Krasnodar-2	2015–16	Russian Second League	1	0	—		—		—		1	0
Krasnodar-2	2016–17	Russian Second League	17	0	—		—		—		17	0
Krasnodar-2	2017–18	Russian Second League	14	0	—		—		1 (Note: Appearances in the FNL Cup)	0	15	0
Krasnodar-2	2018–19	Russian First League	23	0	—		—		2	0	25	0
Krasnodar-2	2019–20	Russian First League	18	0	—		—		—		18	0
Krasnodar-2	2020–21	Russian First League	15	0	—		—		—		15	0
Krasnodar-2	Total		88	0	—		—		3	0	91	0
Krasnodar	2016–17	Russian Premier League	0	0	0	0	0	0	—		0	0
Krasnodar	2017–18	Russian Premier League	0	0	1	0	0	0	—		1	0
Krasnodar	2018–19	Russian Premier League	0	0	0	0	0	0	—		0	0
Krasnodar	2019–20	Russian Premier League	2	0	0	0	0	0	—		2	0
Krasnodar	2020–21	Russian Premier League	0	0	0	0	0	0	—		0	0
Krasnodar	Total		2	0	1	0	0	0	—		3	0
Krasnodar-3	2018–19	Russian Second League	2	0	—		—		—		2	0
Krasnodar-3	2019–20	Russian Second League	1	1	—		—		—		1	1
Krasnodar-3	Total		3	1	—		—		—		3	1
Sochi	2020–21	Russian Premier League	0	0	1	0	—		—		1	0
Sochi	2021–22	Russian Premier League	11	0	0	0	0	0	—		11	0
Sochi	2022–23	Russian Premier League	17	0	4	0	—		—		21	0
Sochi	Total		28	0	5	0	—		—		33	0
Zenit St. Petersburg	2023–24	Russian Premier League	9	0	7	0	—		—		16	0
Zenit St. Petersburg	2024–25	Russian Premier League	4	0	12	0	—		—		16	0
Zenit St. Petersburg	2025–26	Russian Premier League	26	0	2	0	—		—		28	0
Zenit St. Petersburg	2026–27	Russian Premier League	11	0	1	0	—		1 (Note: Appearance in Russian Super Cup)	0	13	0
Zenit St. Petersburg	Total		50	0	22	0	—		1	0	73	0
Career total			171	1	28	0	0	0	4	0	203	1

=== International ===
As of match played 9 June 2026

Appearances and goals by national team and year
National team	Year	Apps	Goals
Russia	2026	1	0
Total		1	0
