= Gustavo Mantuan =

Brazilian footballer (born 2001)

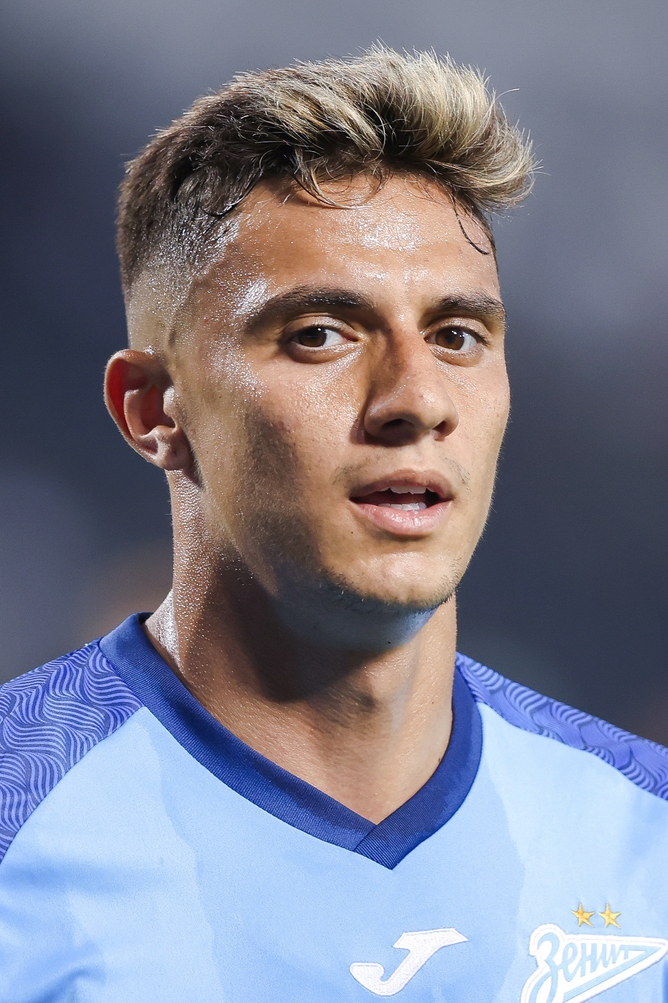
- Mantuan with Zenit Saint Petersburg in 2024

Personal information
- Date of birth: 20 June 2001 (age 25)
- Place of birth: Santo André, Brazil
- Height: 1.74 m (5 ft 9 in)
- Position: Right-back

Team information
- Current team: Zenit Saint Petersburg
- Number: 31

Youth career
- 2007–2020: Corinthians

Senior career*
Years	Team	Apps	(Gls)
2020–2023	Corinthians	23	(4)
2022–2023	→ Zenit Saint Petersburg (loan)	22	(6)
2023–	Zenit Saint Petersburg	91	(10)
- * Club domestic league appearances and goals as of 21 November 2026

Gustavo Mantuan (born 20 June 2001) is a Brazilian professional footballer who plays as a midfielder for Russian Premier League club Zenit Saint Petersburg.

== Club career ==
=== Corinthians ===
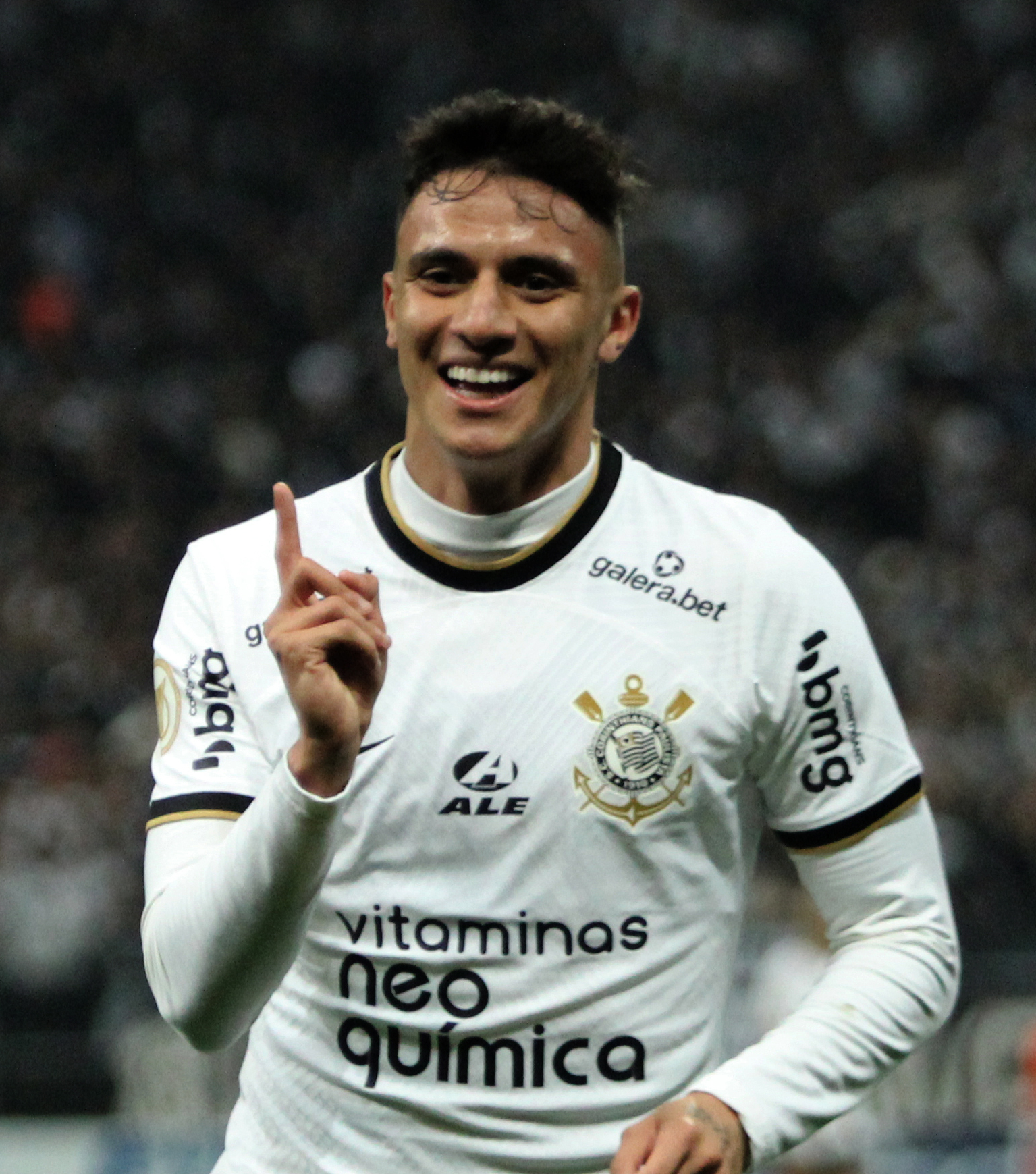
Mantuan with Corinthians in 2022

Mantuan started his career when he was six years old at Corinthians' youth squad, playing futsal until age 13, before changing full time to the football team.

He made his professional debut for Corinthians in a 2020 Campeonato Brasileiro Série A away match against Sport Recife on 24 September 2020.

=== Zenit St. Petersburg ===
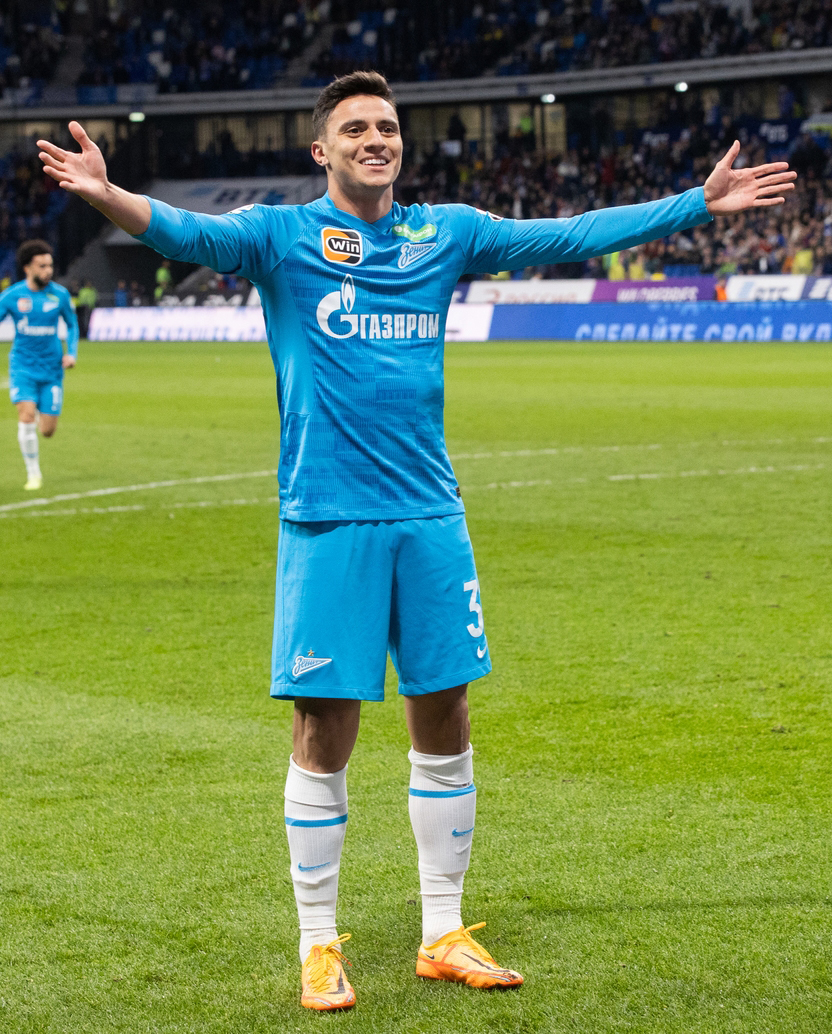
Mantuan with Zenit in 2022

On 29 June 2022, Russian champions FC Zenit Saint Petersburg announced an agreement with Corinthians under which Mantuan and Ivan would move on loan to Zenit and Yuri Alberto would be loaned in the opposite direction. On 13 August 2022, he scored his first goal for Zenit, a late winning goal in a 2–1 home win over PFC CSKA Moscow, in his debut game with Zenit.

On 23 June 2023, Zenit made the transfer permanent and signed a four-year contract with Mantuan, with an optional fifth year.

On 2 October 2025, his Zenit contract was extended to June 2030.

== Personal life ==
He is the younger brother of former Corinthians player Guilherme Mantuan.

== Career statistics ==
As of match played 21 November 2026

Appearances and goals by club, season and competition
Club	Season	League			State League		Cup (Note: Includes Copa do Brasil, Russian Cup)		Continental		Other		Total	
Club	Season	Division	Apps	Goals	Apps	Goals	Apps	Goals	Apps	Goals	Apps	Goals	Apps	Goals
Corinthians	2020	Série A	7	1	0	0	0	0	0	0	—		7	1
Corinthians	2021	Série A	3	0	0	0	0	0	0	0	—		3	0
Corinthians	2022	Série A	14	3	9	1	3	1	7	0	—		33	5
Corinthians	Total		24	4	9	1	3	1	7	0	—		43	6
Zenit St. Petersburg (loan)	2022–23	Russian Premier League	22	6	—		7	0	—		—		29	6
Zenit St. Petersburg	2023–24	Russian Premier League	26	3	—		10	1	—		1 (Note: Appearances in Russian Super Cup)	0	37	4
Zenit St. Petersburg	2024–25	Russian Premier League	27	3	—		10	1	—		1	0	38	4
Zenit St. Petersburg	2025–26	Russian Premier League	24	3	—		7	1	—		—		31	4
Zenit St. Petersburg	2026–27	Russian Premier League	14	1	—		4	0	—		1	0	19	1
Zenit St. Petersburg	Total		91	10	—		31	3	—		3	0	125	13
Zenit St. Petersburg	Club total		113	16	—		38	3	—		3	0	154	19
Career total			137	20	9	1	41	4	7	0	3	0	197	25

== Honours ==
Zenit St. Petersburg

- Russian Premier League: 2022–23, 2023–24, 2025–26
- Russian Cup: 2023–24
- Russian Super Cup: 2023, 2024, 2026
