= 2026 Russian Super Cup =

Football match in Nizhny Novgorod, Russia

Zenit Saint Petersburg	Spartak Moscow
1	1
- Zenit Saint Petersburg won 4–2 on penalties
- Date: 18 July 2026
- Venue: Nizhny Novgorod Stadium, Nizhny Novgorod
- Referee: Evgeniy Bulanov
- Attendance: 42,139

The 2026 Russian Super Cup (Russian: Суперкубок России по футболу 2026, full name Olimpbet 2026 Russian Super Cup for sponsorship reasons) was the 24th edition of the Russian Super Cup, an annual football match organised jointly by the Russian Football Union and the Russian Premier League. It was contested by the reigning champions of the Russian Premier League, Zenit Saint Petersburg and holders of the Russian Cup, Spartak Moscow. It was played at Nizhny Novgorod Stadium in Nizhny Novgorod, Russia. Zenit won 4–2 in a penalty shoot-out after the game ended in a 1–1 tie for its tenth title of Russian Super Cup.

== Teams ==
Team	Qualification	Previous participations (bold indicates winners)
Zenit Saint Petersburg	2025–26 Russian Premier League champions	12 (**2008**, **2011**, 2012, 2013, **2015**, **2016**, 2019, **2020**, **2021**, **2022**, **2023**, **2024**)
Spartak Moscow	2025–26 Russian Cup winners	5 (2004, 2006, 2007, **2017**, 2022)

== Match ==
=== Details ===
18 July 2026
19:30 MSK (UTC+3)

Zenit Saint Petersburg	1–1	Spartak Moscow
Sobolev 90+8' (pen.)	Report	Martins 25'
Penalties
Diveyev (penalty scored); Felipe Augusto (penalty scored); Mostovoy (penalty missed); Jhon Jhon (penalty scored); Sobolev (penalty scored)	4–2	(penalty scored) Solari; (penalty missed) Umyarov; (penalty missed) Dmitriyev; (penalty scored) Wooh

Nizhny Novgorod Stadium, Nizhny Novgorod
Attendance: 42,139
Referee: Evgeniy Bulanov (Saransk)

GK	16	(Russia) Denis Adamov	(yellow card) 90+4'
RB	6	(Slovenia) Vanja Drkušić		(substituted off) 46'
CB	78	(Russia) Igor Diveyev
CB	33	(Brazil) Nino	(yellow card) 53'	(substituted off) 59'
LB	66	(Argentina) Román Vega
CM	5	(Colombia) Wilmar Barrios (c)		(substituted off) 59'
CM	8	(Brazil) Wendel
RW	10	(Russia) Maksim Glushenkov		(substituted off) 75'
AM	20	(Brazil) Pedro	(yellow card) 58'
LW	31	(Brazil) Gustavo Mantuan		(substituted off) 88'
CF	7	(Russia) Aleksandr Sobolev
Substitutes:
GK	1	(Russia) Yevgeni Latyshonok
GK	57	(Russia) Bogdan Moskvichyov
DF	4	(Russia) Yuri Gorshkov
DF	15	(Russia) Vyacheslav Karavayev
DF	25	(Colombia) Kevin Andrade		(substituted on) 59'
DF	28	(Kazakhstan) Nuraly Alip	(yellow card) 90+11'
DF	82	(Russia) Sergei Volkov		(substituted on) 88'
MF	14	(Brazil) Jhon Jhon		(substituted on) 46'
MF	17	(Russia) Andrei Mostovoy		(substituted on) 75'
MF	21	(Russia) Aleksandr Yerokhin
MF	61	(Russia) Daniil Kondakov
FW	9	(Brazil) Felipe Augusto		(substituted on) 59'
Manager:
(Russia) Sergei Semak

GK	98	(Russia) Aleksandr Maksimenko
RB	83	(Portugal) Gedson Fernandes	(yellow card) 38'	(substituted off) 81'
CB	3	(Cameroon) Christopher Wooh
CB	6	(Serbia) Srđan Babić		(substituted off) 74'
LB	47	(Russia) Roman Zobnin (c)
CM	68	(Russia) Ruslan Litvinov
CM	18	(Russia) Nail Umyarov
RW	7	(Argentina) Pablo Solari
AM	35	(Luxembourg) Christopher Martins		(substituted off) 74'
LW	10	(Brazil) Marquinhos		(substituted off) 83'
CF	5	(Argentina) Esequiel Barco		(substituted off) 81'
Substitutes:
GK	1	(Russia) Ilya Pomazun
GK	56	(Russia) Aleksandr Dovbnya
DF	4	(Ghana) Alexander Djiku		(substituted on) 74'
DF	33	(Spain) Víctor Parada
DF	82	(Russia) Daniil Khlusevich
DF	97	(Russia) Daniil Denisov		(substituted on) 74'
MF	17	(Russia) Vladislav Saus
MF	24	(Russia) Nikita Massalyga
MF	25	(Russia) Danil Prutsev		(substituted on) 81'
MF	27	(Russia) Igor Dmitriyev		(substituted on) 83'
FW	9	(Costa Rica) Manfred Ugalde		(substituted on) 81'
FW	11	(Trinidad and Tobago) Levi García
Manager:
(Spain) Juan Carlos Carcedo

Assistant referees:
Dmitry Safyan (Moscow)
Alexander Bogdanov (Vereya)
Fourth official:
Andrey Prokopov (Yaroslavl)
VAR:
Sergei Karasev (Moscow)
AVAR:
Anton Frolov (Moscow)
Inspector:
Viktor Kulagin (Moscow)

**Match rules**

- 90 minutes
- No extra time
- Penalty shoot-out if scores still level
- Eleven named substitutes
- Maximum of five substitutions
