= Wendel (footballer, born 1997) =

Brazilian association football player

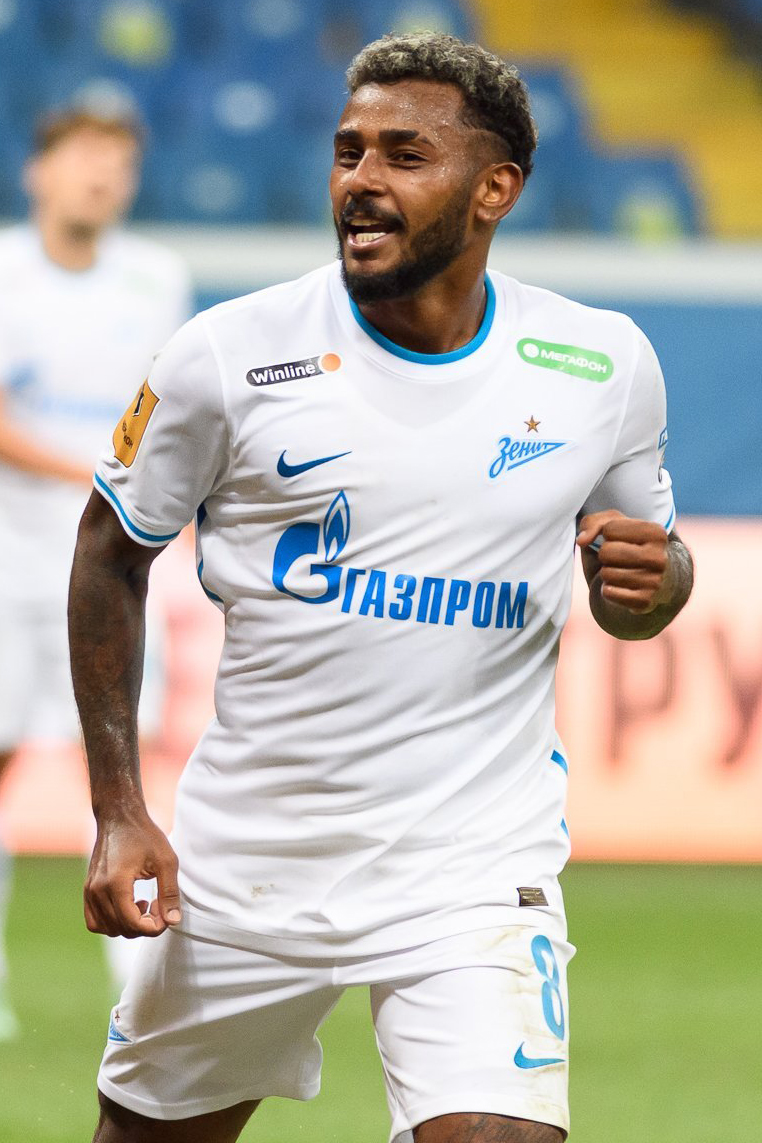
- Wendel with Zenit in 2021

Personal information
- Full name: Marcus Wendel Valle da Silva
- Date of birth: 28 August 1997 (age 29)
- Place of birth: Duque de Caxias, Brazil
- Height: 1.80 m (5 ft 11 in)
- Position: Midfielder

Team information
- Current team: Zenit Saint Petersburg
- Number: 8

Youth career
- Tigres do Brasil
- 2016–2017: Fluminense

Senior career*
Years	Team	Apps	(Gls)
2017–2018	Fluminense	42	(6)
2018–2020	Sporting CP	54	(4)
2020–	Zenit Saint Petersburg	149	(20)

International career^{‡}
2019–2020	Brazil U23	12	(1)
- * Club domestic league appearances and goals as of 21 November 2026 ‡ National team caps and goals as of 2 July 2021

Marcus Wendel Valle da Silva (born 28 August 1997), commonly known as Wendel, is a Brazilian footballer who plays for Russian club Zenit Saint Petersburg. He plays as a central midfielder, an attacking midfielder or a left midfielder.

== Club career ==
=== Fluminense ===
Wendel started his career at Tigres do Brasil's youth team, and then in 2015, he moved to Fluminense. He made his debut in the Campeonato Brasileiro Série A on 14 May 2017, in a match against Santos. He scored his first goal in the league on 18 June 2017, in a match against Flamengo. In the 2017 Campeonato Brasileiro Série A season, Wendel played 33 matches and scored 5 goals.

=== Sporting CP ===
Wendel signed a contract with Sporting Clube de Portugal in January 2018, valid until 2023, with a termination clause, with Fluminense receiving 10% of the money. Wendel initially had difficulty adapting to the tempo and tactics of European football which led to low playing time during the early campaign. However, after the appointment of Marcel Keizer as manager of the club, Wendel became a usual starter. In the beginning of December, Wendel suffered a left knee sprain which sidelined him for 2 months.

=== Zenit Saint Petersburg ===
On 6 October 2020, Wendel joined Russian club Zenit Saint Petersburg on a five-year contract. On 21 July 2022, Wendel extended his contract with Zenit until 2027. On 11 September 2022, Wendel scored the first hat-trick of his career in a 8–0 victory against FC Orenburg. In August 2024, he extended his contract with Zenit to June 2028.

On 20 January 2025, Russian champions Zenit St. Petersburg announced the transfer of Luiz Henrique to Zenit, with Artur moving in the opposite direction, following by Wendel also moving to Botafogo at the end of the 2024–25 Russian season in June 2025.

However, the transfer was voided after the US Government imposed new economic sanctions over the Russian club's owners, as informed by Botafogo via press release on 21 May 2025.

On 1 November 2025, Wendel extended his contract with Zenit to June 2029.

== Career statistics ==
As of match played 21 November 2026

Appearances and goals by club, season and competition
Club	Season	League			National cup (Note: Includes Copa do Brasil, Taça de Portugal, Russian Cup)		League cup (Note: Includes Taça da Liga)		Continental		Other		Total	
Club	Season	Division	Apps	Goals	Apps	Goals	Apps	Goals	Apps	Goals	Apps	Goals	Apps	Goals
Fluminense	2017	Série A	33	5	5	0	—		8	1	9 (Note: Appearances in Campeonato Carioca)	1	55	7
Sporting	2017–18	Primeira Liga	4	0	0	0	0	0	0	0	—		4	0
Sporting	2018–19	Primeira Liga	21	1	5	1	4	1	3	0	—		33	3
Sporting	2019–20	Primeira Liga	28	3	0	0	4	0	6	0	1 (Note: Appearance in Supertaça Cândido de Oliveira)	0	39	3
Sporting	2020–21	Primeira Liga	1	0	0	0	0	0	2	0	—		3	0
Sporting	Total		54	4	5	1	8	1	11	0	1	0	79	6
Zenit	2020–21	Russian Premier League	15	2	1	0	—		4	0	—		20	2
Zenit	2021–22	Russian Premier League	25	3	1	0	—		8	1	1 (Note: Appearance in Russian Super Cup)	0	35	4
Zenit	2022–23	Russian Premier League	25	8	6	0	—		—		1	1	32	9
Zenit	2023–24	Russian Premier League	27	4	8	0	—		—		0	0	35	4
Zenit	2024–25	Russian Premier League	22	1	4	0	—		—		1	1	27	2
Zenit	2025–26	Russian Premier League	27	2	3	0	—		—		—		30	2
Zenit	2026–27	Russian Premier League	8	0	0	0	—		—		1	0	9	0
Zenit	Total		149	20	23	0	—		12	1	4	2	188	23
Career total			236	29	33	1	8	1	31	2	14	3	322	36

== Honours ==
Sporting

- Primeira Liga: 2020–21
- Taça de Portugal: 2018–19
- Taça da Liga: 2018–19

Zenit Saint Petersburg

- Russian Premier League: 2020–21, 2021–22, 2022–23, 2023–24, 2025–26
- Russian Cup: 2023–24
- Russian Super Cup: 2021, 2022, 2024, 2026

Individual

- Russian Premier League Team of the Season: 2022–23, 2023–24, 2025–26
