= Dmitri Vasilyev (footballer, born 2004) =

Russian footballer

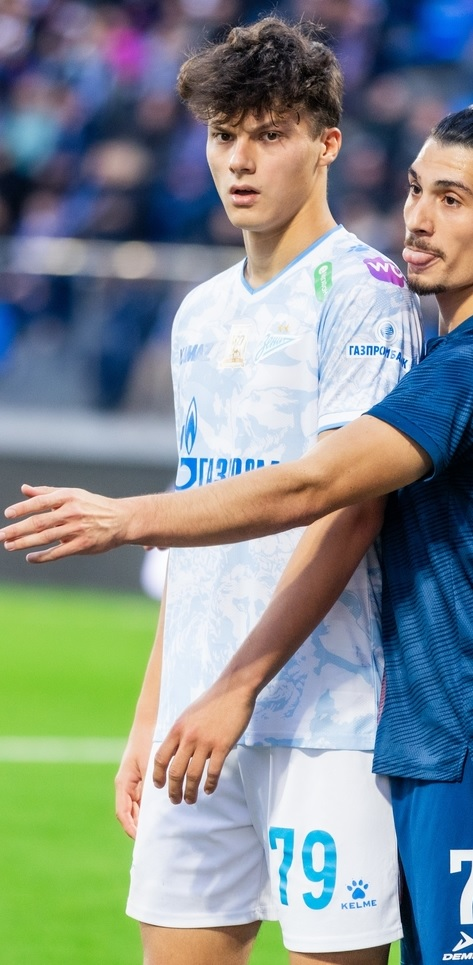
- Vasilyev with Zenit Saint Petersburg in 2024

Personal information
- Full name: Dmitri Alekseyevich Vasilyev
- Date of birth: 16 June 2004 (age 22)
- Place of birth: Saint Petersburg, Russia
- Height: 1.84 m (6 ft 0 in)
- Position: Defensive midfielder

Team information
- Current team: Orenburg
- Number: 18

Youth career
- –2023: Zenit Saint Petersburg

Senior career*
Years	Team	Apps	(Gls)
2021–2023	Zenit-2 Saint Petersburg	3	(0)
2022	→ Orenburg (loan)	5	(0)
2022	→ Orenburg-2 (loan)	5	(0)
2023–2026	Zenit Saint Petersburg	11	(0)
2025	→ Zenit-2 Saint Petersburg	3	(0)
2025–2026	→ Sochi (loan)	25	(2)
2026–	Orenburg	2	(0)

International career^{‡}
2019	Russia U15	6	(0)
2019	Russia U16	6	(0)
2021	Russia U18	5	(0)
2023–2025	Russia U21	7	(0)
2023	Russia U23	2	(0)
- * Club domestic league appearances and goals as of 21 November 2026 ‡ National team caps and goals as of 15 November 2025

Dmitri Alekseyevich Vasilyev (Russian: Дми́трий Алексе́евич Васи́льев; born 16 June 2004) is a Russian football player who plays as a defensive midfielder for Orenburg.

== Club career ==
He made his debut for Zenit Saint Petersburg in the Russian Super Cup match on 15 July 2023 against CSKA Moscow at the 89th minute, replacing Du Queiroz.

He made his Russian Premier League debut for Zenit on 13 August 2023 in a game against Fakel Voronezh.

On 14 December 2023, Vasilyev extended his contract with Zenit until the end of the 2027–28 season.

On 9 July 2025, Vasilyev was loaned by Sochi.

On 3 August 2026, he returned to Orenburg, where he previously played on loan, on a permanent basis.

== International career ==
Vasilyev was first called up to the Russia national football team for a training camp in September 2023.

== Career statistics ==
As of match played 21 November 2026

Appearances and goals by club, season and competition
Club	Season	League			Cup		Other		Total	
Club	Season	Division	Apps	Goals	Apps	Goals	Apps	Goals	Apps	Goals
Zenit-2 Saint Petersburg	2021–22	Russian Second League	3	0	–		–		3	0
Orenburg (loan)	2021–22	Russian First League	5	0	–		–		5	0
Orenburg-2 (loan)	2021–22	Russian Second League	1	0	–		–		1	0
Orenburg-2 (loan)	2022–23	Russian Second League	4	0	–		–		4	0
Orenburg-2 (loan)	Total		5	0	–		–		5	0
Zenit St. Petersburg	2022–23	Russian Premier League	0	0	0	0	–		0	0
Zenit St. Petersburg	2023–24	Russian Premier League	9	0	6	0	1 (Note: Appearance in Russian Super Cup)	0	16	0
Zenit St. Petersburg	2024–25	Russian Premier League	2	0	7	2	–		9	2
Zenit St. Petersburg	Total		11	0	13	2	1	0	25	2
Sochi (loan)	2025–26	Russian Premier League	25	2	5	1	–		30	3
Orenburg	2026–27	Russian Premier League	2	0	2	0	–		4	0
Orenburg	Club total		7	0	2	0	0	0	9	0
Career total			51	2	20	3	1	0	72	5

== Honours ==
=== Zenit Saint Petersburg ===
- Russian Premier League: 2023–24
- Russian Cup: 2023–24
- Russian Super Cup: 2023
