= Bogdan Moskvichyov =

Russian footballer (born 2004)

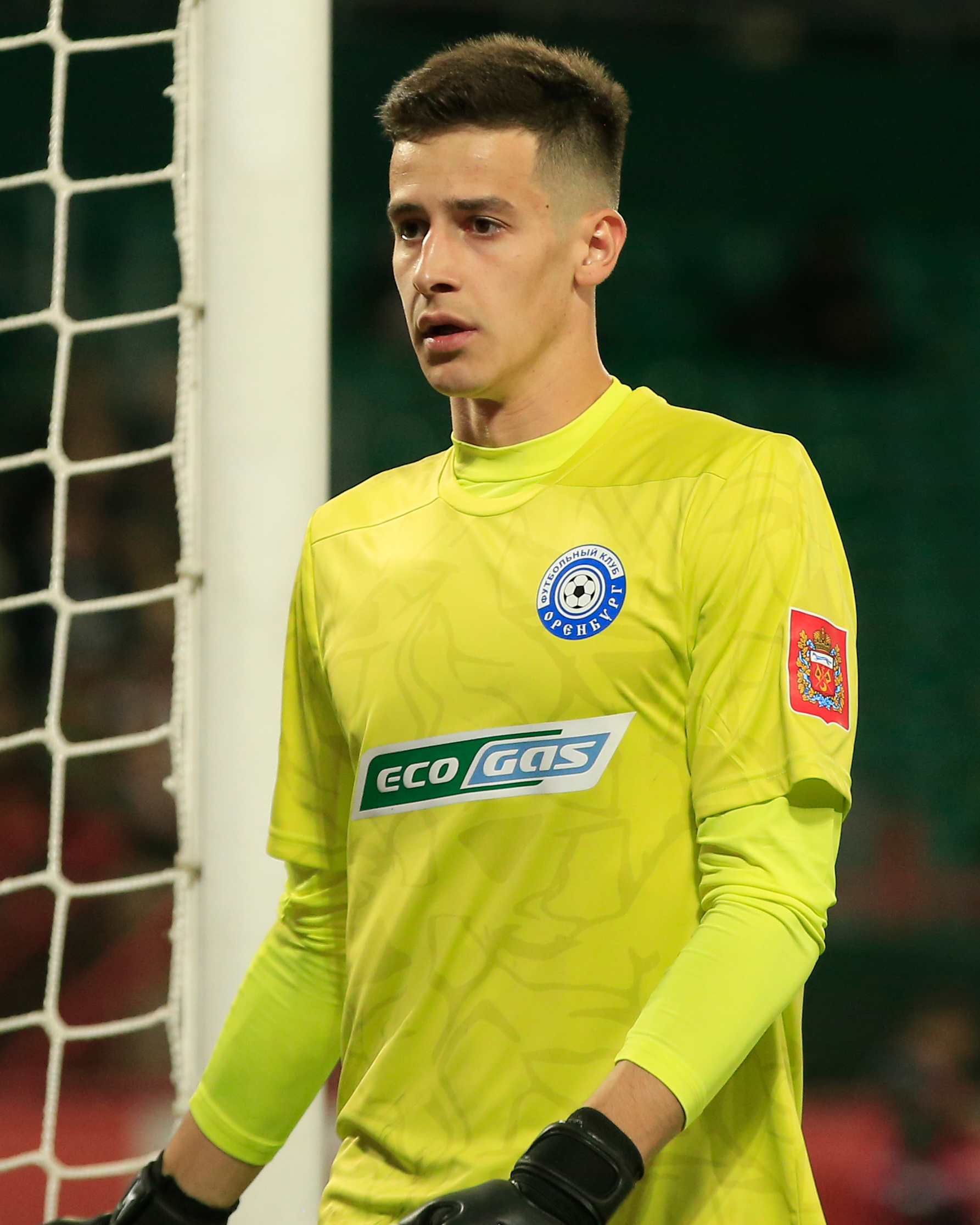
- Moskvichyov with Orenburg in 2024

Personal information
- Full name: Bogdan Aleksandrovich Moskvichyov
- Date of birth: 30 April 2004 (age 22)
- Place of birth: Saint Petersburg, Russia
- Height: 1.93 m (6 ft 4 in)
- Position: Goalkeeper

Team information
- Current team: Zenit St. Petersburg
- Number: 57

Youth career
- 2013–2021: Zenit St. Petersburg

Senior career*
Years	Team	Apps	(Gls)
2022–	Zenit St. Petersburg	4	(0)
2022	→ Zenit-2 St. Petersburg	1	(0)
2024	→ Chayka Peschanokopskoye (loan)	13	(0)
2024–2025	→ Orenburg (loan)	17	(0)

International career^{‡}
2019–2020	Russia U-16	4	(0)
2021	Russia U-17	1	(0)
2021	Russia U-18	2	(0)
2023–2025	Russia U-21	4	(0)
- * Club domestic league appearances and goals as of 21 November 2026 ‡ National team caps and goals as of 22 March 2025

Bogdan Aleksandrovich Moskvichyov (Russian: Богдан Александрович Москвичёв; born 30 April 2004) is a Russian football player who plays as a goalkeeper for Zenit St. Petersburg.

== Career ==
On 21 June 2024, Moskvichyov moved on loan to Russian Premier League club Orenburg for the 2024–25 season.

Moskvichyov made his debut for Orenburg on 31 July 2024 in a Russian Cup game against Khimki. He made his Russian Premier League debut for Orenburg on 17 August 2024 against Rostov. He saved a penalty kick in the game, but Orenburg lost 2–3. He then saved two more penalty kicks in his third and fourth league games against Dynamo Moscow and Lokomotiv Moscow respectively.

== Honours ==
Zenit Saint Petersburg

- Russian Super Cup: 2026

== Career statistics ==
As of 21 November 2026

Club	Season	League			Cup		Total	
Club	Season	Division	Apps	Goals	Apps	Goals	Apps	Goals
Zenit-2 St. Petersburg	2021–22	Russian Second League	1	0	–		1	0
Zenit St. Petersburg	2022–23	Russian Premier League	0	0	0	0	0	0
Zenit St. Petersburg	2025–26	Russian Premier League	0	0	0	0	0	0
Zenit St. Petersburg	2026–27	Russian Premier League	4	0	4	0	8	0
Zenit St. Petersburg	Total		4	0	4	0	8	0
Chayka Peschanokopskoye (loan)	2023–24	Russian Second League A	13	0	–		13	0
Orenburg (loan)	2024–25	Russian Premier League	17	0	5	0	22	0
Career total			35	0	9	0	44	0
