= List of Russian football transfers summer 2024 =

This is a list of Russian football transfers in the 2024 summer transfer window by club. Only clubs of the 2024–25 Russian Premier League are included.

== Russian Premier League 2024–25 ==
=== Akhmat Grozny ===
In: Note: Flags indicate national team as defined under FIFA eligibility rules; some limited exceptions apply. Players may hold more than one non-FIFA nationality.

No.	Pos.	Nation	Player
2	DF	RUS	Aleksandr Zhirov (from Baltika Kaliningrad)
11	MF	BRA	Ismael Silva
19	MF	ARG	Mauro Luna Diale (from (Argentina) Unión de Santa Fe)
20	FW	KAZ	Maksim Samorodov (from (Kazakhstan) Aktobe)
30	FW	BRA	Felippe Cardoso (from (Portugal) Casa Pia)
47	MF	RUS	Daniil Utkin (on loan from Rostov)
95	DF	RUS	Arsen Adamov (on loan from Zenit St. Petersburg)
98	FW	BUL	Svetoslav Kovachev (from (Bulgaria) Arda Kardzhali, previously on loan)

Out: Note: Flags indicate national team as defined under FIFA eligibility rules; some limited exceptions apply. Players may hold more than one non-FIFA nationality.

No.	Pos.	Nation	Player
6	DF	BIH	Jasmin Čeliković (on loan to (Greece) Panetolikos, previously from (Bosnia and Herzegovina) Tuzla City, previously on loan from Tuzla City)
9	FW	RUS	Gamid Agalarov (to Dynamo Makhachkala)
13	FW	BFA	Mohamed Konaté (to (Saudi Arabia) Al-Riyadh)
15	DF	RUS	Andrei Semyonov
21	MF	RUS	Ivan Oleynikov (to Krylia Sovetov Samara)
29	FW	RUS	Vladimir Ilyin (to Fakel Voronezh)
47	FW	CIV	Néné Gbamblé (to Torpedo Moscow)
94	MF	RUS	Artyom Timofeyev (to Lokomotiv Moscow)
—	GK	RUS	Rizvan Tashayev (on loan to Sokol Kazan, previously on loan to Dynamo Bryansk)
—	DF	RUS	Vladislav Volkov (on loan to Volgar Astrakhan, previously on loan to Leningradets Leningrad Oblast)
—	MF	RUS	Ilya Moseychuk (to Kuban Krasnodar, previously on loan)

=== Akron Tolyatti ===
In: Note: Flags indicate national team as defined under FIFA eligibility rules; some limited exceptions apply. Players may hold more than one non-FIFA nationality.

No.	Pos.	Nation	Player
4	DF	BRA	Paulo Vitor (from (Brazil) Maguary)
5	MF	SRB	Aleksa Đurasović (from (Serbia) Spartak Subotica)
6	MF	RUS	Maksim Kuzmin (from Baltika Kaliningrad)
11	FW	CPV	Benchimol (from (Portugal) Estoril)
13	FW	CGO	Mavis Tchibota (from (Israel) Hapoel Tel Aviv)
14	FW	RUS	Vladimir Khubulov (on loan from Krylia Sovetov Samara)
15	MF	MNE	Stefan Lončar (from (Hungary) Debrecen)
17	FW	RUS	Soltmurad Bakayev (from Rubin Kazan)
21	DF	BOL	Roberto Fernández (on loan from (Bolivia) Bolívar)
22	DF	BLR	Nikita Baranok (from (Belarus) Shakhtyor Soligorsk)
24	FW	RUS	Artem Dzyuba (from Lokomotiv Moscow)
25	MF	UZB	Sherzod Esanov (from (Uzbekistan) Andijon)
26	DF	POR	Rodrigo Escoval (from (Portugal) Vizela)
65	MF	RUS	Vladimir Moskvichyov (on loan from Torpedo Moscow)
69	FW	RUS	Arseni Dmitriyev (from Akron-2 Tolyatti)
78	GK	RUS	Aleksandr Vasyutin (from Zenit St. Petersburg)
80	DF	RUS	Vyacheslav Bardybakhin (from Yenisey Krasnoyarsk)
99	FW	RUS	Ivan Timoshenko (on loan from Rodina Moscow)

Out: Note: Flags indicate national team as defined under FIFA eligibility rules; some limited exceptions apply. Players may hold more than one non-FIFA nationality.

No.	Pos.	Nation	Player
5	DF	RUS	Dzhamaldin Khodzhaniyazov (to (Uzbekistan) Surkhon Termez)
6	MF	RUS	Sergei Makarov (to Alania Vladikavkaz)
8	MF	RUS	Yevgeni Pesegov (to Leningradets Leningrad Oblast)
9	MF	RUS	Nikita Glushkov (to Baltika Kaliningrad)
11	FW	VEN	Andrés Ponce (to (Colombia) Atlético Bucaramanga)
13	MF	RUS	David Khubayev (to KAMAZ Naberezhnye Chelny)
15	DF	RUS	Yegor Danilkin (to Torpedo Moscow)
16	GK	RUS	Timur Akmurzin (to Dynamo Bryansk)
17	DF	RUS	Nikita Krivoruchko (to Akron-2 Tolyatti)
18	MF	RUS	Anton Kilin (to (Armenia) Urartu)
19	GK	RUS	David Sangaré (end of loan from Rodina Moscow)
22	MF	RUS	Vladislav Galkin (end of loan from Dynamo Moscow)
24	MF	RUS	Artyom Pogosov (end of loan from Ufa)
26	DF	SRB	Nemanja Anđelković (to Khimki)
27	MF	RUS	Ivan Chudin (to Ural Yekaterinburg)
35	GK	RUS	Vitali Sychyov (to Torpedo Vladimir)
37	DF	RUS	Vladislav Konovalov (to Akron-2 Tolyatti)
52	DF	RUS	Vadim Konyukhov (end of loan from CSKA Moscow)
55	DF	RUS	Aleksandr Popov (to Akron-2 Tolyatti)
58	MF	RUS	Makar Pestov (end of loan from CSKA Moscow)
59	FW	RUS	Ruslan Bart (to Sochi)
67	MF	RUS	Ali Kartoyev (to Akron-2 Tolyatti)
70	FW	RUS	Abu-Said Eldarushev (to Baltika Kaliningrad)
75	MF	RUS	Vyacheslav Vinnikov (to Akron-2 Tolyatti)
78	MF	RUS	Aleksey Gusev (to Akron-2 Tolyatti)
87	MF	RUS	Nikita Shershov (to Akron-2 Tolyatti)
—	FW	RUS	Ruslan Apekov (to KAMAZ Naberezhnye Chelny, previously on loan to Leningradets Leningrad Oblast)

=== CSKA Moscow ===
In: Note: Flags indicate national team as defined under FIFA eligibility rules; some limited exceptions apply. Players may hold more than one non-FIFA nationality.

No.	Pos.	Nation	Player
3	DF	RUS	Danil Krugovoy (from Zenit St. Petersburg)
8	FW	BLR	Artyom Shumansky (from (Cyprus) Aris Limassol)
9	FW	VEN	Saúl Guarirapa (on loan from Sochi)
15	MF	BIH	Miralem Pjanić (from (United Arab Emirates) Sharjah)
19	MF	RUS	Rifat Zhemaletdinov (from Lokomotiv Moscow)
20	FW	MLI	Sékou Koïta (from (Austria) Red Bull Salzburg)
23	GK	RUS	Ilya Pomazun (end of loan to Ural Yekaterinburg)
25	MF	CRO	Kristijan Bistrović (end of loan to Baltika Kaliningrad)
45	GK	RUS	Danila Bokov (end of loan to Chayka Peschanokopskoye)
46	FW	RUS	Vladislav Yakovlev (end of loan to Khimki)
50	FW	RUS	Dmitry Koverov (from own Under-19 squad)
81	MF	RUS	Daniil Reznichenko (from Yunost Moskvy-Torpedo academy)

Out: Note: Flags indicate national team as defined under FIFA eligibility rules; some limited exceptions apply. Players may hold more than one non-FIFA nationality.

No.	Pos.	Nation	Player
9	FW	RUS	Fyodor Chalov (to (Greece) PAOK)
7	FW	CHI	Víctor Dávila (to (Mexico) América)
14	DF	RUS	Kirill Nababkin (to SKA Rostov-on-Don)
19	MF	ALG	Sid Ahmed Aissaoui (on loan to (Moldova) Sheriff Tiraspol)
34	MF	CHI	Víctor Méndez (on loan to Krylia Sovetov Samara)
38	FW	ARG	Adolfo Gaich (on loan to (Turkey) Antalyaspor, previously on loan to (Turkey) Çaykur Rizespor)
47	FW	RUS	Renat Golybin (on loan to Neftekhimik Nizhnekamsk)
61	MF	RUS	Roman Chenchikov (to Murom)
68	DF	RUS	Mikhail Ryadno (on loan to Rodina Moscow)
86	GK	RUS	Vladimir Shaykhutdinov (on loan to Volga Ulyanovsk)
91	FW	RUS	Anton Zabolotny (to Khimki)
96	DF	IRI	Amirhossein Reyvandi (on loan to (Uzbekistan) Bukhara, previously from (Iran) KIA, previously on loan from KIA)
—	DF	RUS	Vadim Karpov (to Ufa, previously on loan)
—	DF	RUS	Vadim Konyukhov (to Veles Moscow, previously on loan to Akron Tolyatti)
—	DF	RUS	Yegor Noskov (on loan to SKA-Khabarovsk, previously on loan to Volga Ulyanovsk)
—	MF	RUS	Makar Pestov (to Torpedo Vladimir, previously on loan to Akron Tolyatti)
—	MF	RUS	Andrey Savinov (on loan to Tyumen, previously on loan to SKA-Khabarovsk)
—	MF	RUS	Nikita Yermakov (to Pari Nizhny Novgorod, previously on loan)
—	FW	NGR	Chidera Ejuke (to (Spain) Sevilla, previously on loan to (Belgium) Royal Antwerp)
—	FW	BLR	Ilya Shkurin (to (Poland) Stal Mielec, previously on loan)

=== Dynamo Makhachkala ===
In: Note: Flags indicate national team as defined under FIFA eligibility rules; some limited exceptions apply. Players may hold more than one non-FIFA nationality.

No.	Pos.	Nation	Player
1	GK	RUS	Nikita Goylo (on loan from Zenit St. Petersburg)
5	DF	GEO	Jemal Tabidze (from (Greece) Panetolikos)
8	MF	CIV	Victorien Angban (on loan from Sochi)
10	MF	IRI	Mohammad Javad Hosseinnejad (from (Iran) Sepahan)
16	MF	ALG	Houssem Eddine Mrezigue (from (Algeria) CR Belouizdad)
25	FW	RUS	Gamid Agalarov (from Akhmat Grozny)
54	DF	RUS	Ilya Kirsh (on loan from Zenit St. Petersburg)
70	DF	RUS	Valentin Paltsev (from KAMAZ Naberezhnye Chelny)
82	DF	RUS	Nikita Kotin (on loan from Rostov)
71	DF	SLO	Jan Đapo (from (Slovenia) Domžale)

Out: Note: Flags indicate national team as defined under FIFA eligibility rules; some limited exceptions apply. Players may hold more than one non-FIFA nationality.

No.	Pos.	Nation	Player
6	DF	COL	Francisco Campo (on loan to (Kazakhstan) Shakhter Karagandy)
10	FW	RUS	Ramazan Abduragimov (to Mashuk-KMV Pyatigorsk)
34	DF	RUS	Maksim Khramtsov (on loan to Tyumen)
38	DF	RUS	Artyom Kasimov (end of loan from FC Zenit-2 Saint Petersburg)
46	DF	RUS	Yevgeni Goshev (to Tyumen)
70	MF	RUS	Mikhail Kostyukov (end of loan from Rubin Kazan)
—	DF	RUS	Kamil Ibragimov (to Chayka Peschanokopskoye, previously on loan)
—	FW	RUS	Magomed Nasibov (to Veles Moscow, previously on loan to Ufa)

=== Dynamo Moscow ===
In: Note: Flags indicate national team as defined under FIFA eligibility rules; some limited exceptions apply. Players may hold more than one non-FIFA nationality.

No.	Pos.	Nation	Player
1	GK	RUS	Andrey Lunyov (from (Azerbaijan) Qarabağ)
11	FW	BRA	Arthur Gomes (from (Brazil) Cruzeiro)
14	FW	MAR	El Mehdi Maouhoub (from (Morocco) Raja)
37	DF	RUS	Vitaly Letechin (from Orenburg academy)
89	MF	RUS	Gleb Miroshnichenko (on loan from Chertanovo Moscow)
98	MF	RUS	Stepan Laskin (from Dynamo-2 Moscow)

Out: Note: Flags indicate national team as defined under FIFA eligibility rules; some limited exceptions apply. Players may hold more than one non-FIFA nationality.

No.	Pos.	Nation	Player
1	GK	RUS	Anton Shunin
4	DF	RUS	Sergei Parshivlyuk (retired)
10	FW	RUS	Fyodor Smolov (to Krasnodar)
11	FW	RUS	Daniil Lesovoy (on loan to (Cyprus) AEL Limassol, previously on loan to (Israel) Maccabi Haifa)
27	DF	RUS	Ruslan Shagiakhmetov (to Sochi)
32	FW	RUS	Ulvi Babayev (on loan to Krylia Sovetov Samara)
38	FW	RUS	Aleksandr Chupayov (to Torpedo Moscow)
53	FW	RUS	Mikhail Gulyayev (to Rubin-2 Kazan)
63	FW	RUS	Stepan Obryvkov (to 2DROTS Moscow)
76	GK	RUS	Ilya Kuptsov (on loan to KAMAZ Naberezhnye Chelny)
85	GK	RUS	Denis Davydov (to Tver)
91	DF	RUS	Yan Tses (to Yenisey Krasnoyarsk)
—	DF	UKR	Ivan Ordets (to (Germany) VfL Bochum, previously on loan)
—	MF	RUS	Vladislav Galkin (to Torpedo Moscow, previously on loan to Akron Tolyatti)
—	MF	RUS	Vladislav Karapuzov (to Pari Nizhny Novgorod, previously on loan)
—	MF	RUS	Ivan Zazvonkin (on loan to Baltika Kaliningrad, previously on loan to Chernomorets Novorossiysk)

=== Fakel Voronezh ===
In: Note: Flags indicate national team as defined under FIFA eligibility rules; some limited exceptions apply. Players may hold more than one non-FIFA nationality.

No.	Pos.	Nation	Player
4	DF	RUS	Maks Dziov (from (Belarus) Dynamo Brest)
6	MF	NED	Dylan Mertens (from (Bulgaria) Botev Plovdiv)
7	FW	FRA	Mohamed Brahimi (from (Bulgaria) Botev Plovdiv)
9	FW	RUS	Aleksei Kashtanov (on loan from Ural Yekaterinburg)
15	FW	RUS	Vladimir Ilyin (from Akhmat Grozny)
17	MF	RUS	Nikolai Giorgobiani (from Alania Vladikavkaz)
21	MF	RUS	Mikhail Shchetinin (on loan from Lokomotiv Moscow)
24	DF	RUS	Shota Chikhradze (from own Under-19 squad)
98	FW	RUS	Ilya Vasin (from own Under-19 squad)

Out: Note: Flags indicate national team as defined under FIFA eligibility rules; some limited exceptions apply. Players may hold more than one non-FIFA nationality.

No.	Pos.	Nation	Player
2	DF	RUS	Vasili Cherov (to Chernomorets Novorossiysk)
7	MF	RUS	Roman Akbashev (to KAMAZ Naberezhnye Chelny)
9	FW	RUS	Maksim Maksimov (to Torpedo Moscow)
14	FW	RUS	Khyzyr Appayev (to Baltika Kaliningrad)
15	DF	RUS	Kirill Suslov (to Sochi)
18	MF	RUS	Andrei Mendel (to Baltika Kaliningrad)
28	DF	RUS	Ruslan Magal (to Sochi)
71	DF	RUS	Nikolai Poyarkov (end of loan from Rostov)
—	MF	RUS	Daniil Chernyakov (to Chayka Peschanokopskoye, previously on loan to Metallurg Lipetsk)
—	MF	RUS	Nikita Yershov (to (Belarus) Arsenal Dzerzhinsk, previously on loan to Irtysh Omsk)
—	FW	RUS	Matvey Ivakhnov (on loan to Tekstilshchik Ivanovo, previously on loan to Sokol Saratov)

=== Khimki ===
In: Note: Flags indicate national team as defined under FIFA eligibility rules; some limited exceptions apply. Players may hold more than one non-FIFA nationality.

No.	Pos.	Nation	Player
11	FW	RUS	Reziuan Mirzov (from (Azerbaijan) Neftçi)
14	DF	RUS	Georgi Dzhikiya (from Spartak Moscow)
15	DF	VEN	Diego Luna (on loan from Baltika Kaliningrad)
17	MF	RUS	Ilya Berkovski (from Lokomotiv Moscow, previously on loan)
18	MF	RUS	Zelimkhan Bakayev (on loan from Zenit St. Petersburg)
21	FW	UZB	Alisher Odilov (from (Uzbekistan) Olympic Tashkent)
22	MF	COL	Robert Mejía (on loan from (Colombia) Once Caldas)
24	DF	PAN	Edgardo Fariña (from (Panama) Independiente)
25	DF	RUS	Aleksandr Filin (from (Belgium) Eupen)
26	DF	SRB	Nemanja Anđelković (from Akron Tolyatti)
27	DF	CIV	Cédric Gogoua (from Shinnik Yaroslavl)
32	MF	ARG	Lucas Vera (from Orenburg)
39	MF	RUS	Mark Vysochenko (from Ural Yekaterinburg Under-19)
47	DF	RUS	Rasul Guseynov (from Khimki-M)
52	DF	RUS	Oleg Dzantiyev (from Khimki-M)
55	MF	BLR	Kirill Kaplenko (from Baltika Kaliningrad)
64	MF	RUS	Grigory Loskov
68	MF	RUS	Pavel Malozyomov (from Khimki-M)
70	MF	RUS	Ruslan Ozdoyev (from Khimki-M)
72	DF	ESP	Dani Fernández (from (Spain) Racing de Santander)
74	FW	RUS	Artyom Anoshin (from Khimki-M)
76	MF	RUS	Maksim Gavrilov (from Khimki-M)
77	MF	ESP	Álex Corredera (from (Spain) Tenerife)
85	DF	RUS	Artyom Beskibalny (end of loan to Dynamo-2 Moscow)
87	GK	RUS	Nikita Kokarev (from Arsenal Tula)
88	MF	RUS	Denis Glushakov (from (Armenia) Urartu)
91	FW	RUS	Anton Zabolotny (from CSKA Moscow)
93	GK	RUS	Ilya Tuseyev (end of loan to Leon Saturn Ramenskoye)
95	DF	RUS	Vladislav Goldin (from (Serbia) Red Star Belgrade Under-19)
99	DF	BRA	Orinho (from Rodina Moscow)

Out: Note: Flags indicate national team as defined under FIFA eligibility rules; some limited exceptions apply. Players may hold more than one non-FIFA nationality.

No.	Pos.	Nation	Player
1	GK	RUS	Anton Mitryushkin (to Lokomotiv Moscow)
4	MF	RUS	Oleg Isayenko (on loan to Baltika Kaliningard)
11	FW	ARM	Arshak Koryan (to Torpedo Moscow)
14	MF	RUS	Artur Yusupov (to Ural Yekaterinburg, previously from Sochi)
19	MF	RUS	Aleksey Larin (to Spartak Kostroma)
20	FW	RUS	Vladislav Yakovlev (end of loan from CSKA Moscow)
21	DF	RUS	Amir Mokhammad (to Baltika Kaliningard)
22	MF	KAZ	Lev Skvortsov (on loan to Shinnik Yaroslavl)
23	DF	BLR	Zakhar Volkov (to Arsenal Tula)
24	DF	RUS	Stanislav Poroykov (on loan to Tyumen)
27	DF	RUS	Yuri Zhuravlyov (end of loan from Torpedo Moscow)
31	MF	RUS	Timur Kasimov (on loan to Rotor Volgograd)
32	MF	RUS	Artyom Kulishev (to Tyumen)
36	DF	URU	Cristian González (to (Portugal) Feirense, previously on loan to (Portugal) Torreense)
52	MF	RUS	Ravil Netfullin (to Torpedo Moscow)
57	MF	BLR	Roman Yuzepchuk (on loan to Sokol Saratov)
62	MF	BUL	Lachezar Kotev (to (Bulgaria) Arda Kardzhali, previously on loan)
66	DF	BRA	Léo Andrade (to (Greece) Lamia)
67	DF	RUS	Sergey Varatynov (to Baltika Kaliningrad)
99	GK	RUS	Ivan Pavlov (to Arsenal-2 Tula)
—	DF	RUS	Artur Chyorny (to Shinnik Yaroslavl, previously on loan to Zenit-2 St. Petersburg)
—	MF	CIV	Boni Amian (on loan to (Belarus) Dinamo Minsk, previously on loan to (Belarus) Dnepr Mogilev)
—	MF	ARM	Petros Avetisyan (to Alashkert, previously on loan to Ararat-Armenia)
—	MF	CIV	Mory Gbane (to (Portugal) Gil Vicente, previously on loan)
—	MF	RUS	Danila Yanov (to Chayka Peschanokopskoye, previously on loan to Murom)
—	FW	RUS	Ilya Porokhov (on loan to Ural Yekaterinburg, previously from Tyumen)

=== Krasnodar ===
In: Note: Flags indicate national team as defined under FIFA eligibility rules; some limited exceptions apply. Players may hold more than one non-FIFA nationality.

No.	Pos.	Nation	Player
4	DF	BRA	Diego Costa (from (Brazil) São Paulo)
8	MF	RUS	Danila Kozlov (from Baltika Kaliningrad)
13	GK	RUS	Yury Dyupin (from Rubin Kazan)
18	MF	RUS	Yury Gazinsky (from Ural Yekaterinburg)
19	FW	RUS	Fyodor Smolov (from Dynamo Moscow)
20	DF	URU	Giovanni González (from (Spain) Mallorca)
36	DF	RUS	Danila Gayvoronsky (end of loan to Chernomorets Novorossiysk)
37	GK	RUS	Yegor Postrigan (from own academy)
38	DF	RUS	Kirill Zhitlov (from own academy)
41	MF	RUS	Timur Abdrashitov (from Kaluga)
42	DF	RUS	Emin Eskerov (from own academy)
43	DF	RUS	Yegor Kartashov (from own academy)
48	DF	RUS	Bogdan Surikov (from own academy)
56	GK	RUS	Stepan Cherednikov (from own academy)
57	FW	RUS	Ivan Kovrechenkov (from own academy)
64	MF	RUS	Pavel Golubkov (from own academy)
65	FW	RUS	Yaroslav Sosnikhin (from own academy)
69	MF	RUS	Artyom Sidorenko (from own academy)
72	DF	RUS	Artyom Kuzmenko (from own academy)
81	MF	RUS	Dmitry Paderin (end of loan to Ural-2 Yekaterinburg)
82	GK	RUS	Ivan Fedko (from own academy)
91	MF	RUS	Marat Mamedov (from own academy)
97	FW	RUS	Aleksi Gvenetadze (from own academy)
99	FW	RUS	Aleksandr Beketov (from own academy)

Out: Note: Flags indicate national team as defined under FIFA eligibility rules; some limited exceptions apply. Players may hold more than one non-FIFA nationality.

No.	Pos.	Nation	Player
4	DF	PAR	Júnior Alonso (to (Brazil) Atlético Mineiro)
14	MF	SRB	Mihajlo Banjac (on loan to (Serbia) TSC)
20	FW	BRA	Kady Borges (to (Hungary) Ferencváros)
21	FW	RUS	Danil Karpov (on loan to Tyumen)
23	DF	RUS	Aleksandr Ektov (on loan to Pari Nizhny Novgorod)
28	DF	RUS	Grigory Zhilkin (on loan to Arsenal Tula)
36	FW	RUS	Kamil Mullin (to Ufa)
39	GK	RUS	Matvei Safonov (to (France) Paris Saint-Germain)
41	DF	RUS	Mikhail Sukhoruchenko (on loan to Tyumen)
45	DF	RUS	Aleksandr Kulikov (on loan to Spartak Kostroma)
48	FW	RUS	Yuri Zheleznov (end of loan from Ural Yekaterinburg)
54	DF	RUS	Ivan Churikov (to Sokol Saratov)
56	MF	RUS	Ruslan Chobanov (on loan to Sokol Saratov)
57	MF	RUS	Nikita Plotnikov (on loan to Rotor Volgograd)
73	GK	RUS	Mikhail Shtepa (on loan to Chayka Peschanokopskoye)
81	DF	RUS	Nikita Semenenko (to Sibir Novosibirsk)
82	DF	RUS	Sergei Volkov (to Zenit St. Petersburg)
—	MF	RUS	David Kokoyev (on loan to Alania Vladikavkaz, previously on loan to Neftekhimik Nizhnekamsk)
—	FW	RUS	Rustam Khalnazarov (to (Uzbekistan) Lokomotiv Tashkent, previously on loan to (Georgia (country)) Telavi)
—	FW	NGR	Jonathan Okoronkwo (to (Turkey) Hatayspor, previously on loan to Arsenal Tula)
—	FW	RUS	Magomed-Shapi Suleymanov (to (Greece) Aris Thessaloniki, previously on loan)
—	FW	RUS	Aleksandr Yegurnev (on loan to Spartak Kostroma, previously on loan to Khimik Dzerzhinsk)

=== Krylia Sovetov Samara ===
In: Note: Flags indicate national team as defined under FIFA eligibility rules; some limited exceptions apply. Players may hold more than one non-FIFA nationality.

No.	Pos.	Nation	Player
3	DF	CHI	Thomas Galdames (from (Argentina) Godoy Cruz)
5	DF	CRO	Dominik Oroz (from (Netherlands) Vitesse)
13	FW	RUS	Ivan Sergeyev (from Zenit St. Petersburg)
17	FW	RUS	Ulvi Babayev (on loan from Dynamo Moscow)
19	MF	RUS	Ivan Oleynikov (from Akhmat Grozny)
28	MF	RUS	Igor Dmitriyev (on loan from Spartak Moscow)
30	GK	RUS	Sergei Pesyakov (from Rostov)
34	MF	CHI	Víctor Méndez (on loan from CSKA Moscow)
51	MF	RUS	Konstantin Lyakhov (from Krylia Sovetov-2 Samara)
58	MF	RUS	Denis Malikov (from own Under-19 squad)
59	MF	RUS	Danila Savelyev (from own Under-19 squad)
96	MF	RUS	Yegor Borisov (from own Under-19 squad)

Out: Note: Flags indicate national team as defined under FIFA eligibility rules; some limited exceptions apply. Players may hold more than one non-FIFA nationality.

No.	Pos.	Nation	Player
5	DF	RUS	Yuri Gorshkov (to Zenit St. Petersburg)
9	FW	RUS	Vladimir Khubulov (on loan to Akron Tolyatti)
14	MF	RUS	Nikita Saltykov (end of loan from Lokomotiv Moscow)
17	FW	BLR	Yegor Karpitsky (on loan to Sokol Saratov)
30	MF	RUS	Artyom Sokolov (on loan to Torpedo Moscow)
31	DF	RUS	Georgi Zotov (to Orenburg)
57	FW	RUS	Rasil Asaydulin (to Kaluga)
69	MF	RUS	Andrey Tsorn (to Salyut Belgorod)
72	DF	RUS	Vladislav Teplyakov (to Murom)
77	FW	RUS	Vladimir Pisarsky (on loan to Sochi)
—	GK	RUS	Daniil Veselov (to Lokomotiv Moscow, previously on loan to Chelyabinsk)
—	DF	RUS	Yan Gudkov (to Chelyabinsk, previously on loan to Sokol Saratov)
—	DF	RUS	Aleksei Nikitenkov (to Chelyabinsk, previously on loan)
—	MF	RUS	Danil Lipovoy (to Arsenal Tula, previously on loan to Neftekhimik Nizhnekamsk)
—	MF	RUS	Nikita Pershin (on loan to SKA-Khabarovsk, previously on loan to Chelyabinsk)
—	FW	SRB	Aleksandar Ćirković (to (Serbia) TSC, previously on loan)
—	FW	RUS	Leonid Gerchikov (on loan to Murom, previously on loan to Chelyabinsk)

=== Lokomotiv Moscow ===
In: Note: Flags indicate national team as defined under FIFA eligibility rules; some limited exceptions apply. Players may hold more than one non-FIFA nationality.

No.	Pos.	Nation	Player
1	GK	RUS	Anton Mitryushkin (from Khimki)
7	MF	ARM	Edgar Sevikyan (on loan from (Hungary) Ferencváros)
10	FW	RUS	Dmitry Vorobyov (from Orenburg)
14	MF	RUS	Nikita Saltykov (end of loan to Krylia Sovetov Samara)
16	GK	RUS	Daniil Veselov (from Krylia Sovetov Samara)
23	DF	MEX	César Montes (from (Spain) Almería)
37	FW	RUS	Dmitry Radikovsky (end of loan to (Belarus) Arsenal Dzerzhinsk)
39	DF	RUS	Pavel Berlov (from own academy)
46	FW	RUS	Bogdan Tsybrov (from Strogino Moscow)
47	DF	RUS	Yegor Vedernikov (from Strogino Moscow)
48	MF	RUS	Daniil Dementyev (from own academy)
49	DF	RUS	Yevgeny Aksyonov (from own academy)
53	GK	RUS	Stanislav Nuzha (from own academy)
54	GK	RUS	Daniil Kopnichev (from own academy)
57	FW	RUS	Marat Atipov (from own academy)
59	DF	RUS	Yegor Pogostnov (end of loan to (Belarus) Arsenal Dzerzhinsk)
61	FW	RUS	Matvey Lykov (from own academy)
65	DF	RUS	Artyom Syomin (from own academy)
76	DF	RUS	Matvey Zakharzhevsky (from own academy)
78	MF	RUS	Fyodor Bondar (from own academy)
94	MF	RUS	Artyom Timofeyev (from Akhmat Grozny)
99	FW	RUS	Timur Suleymanov (from Pari Nizhny Novgorod, previously on loan)

Out: Note: Flags indicate national team as defined under FIFA eligibility rules; some limited exceptions apply. Players may hold more than one non-FIFA nationality.

No.	Pos.	Nation	Player
1	GK	RUS	Guilherme
4	MF	RUS	Stanislav Magkeyev (to Pari Nizhny Novgorod)
7	FW	RUS	Artem Dzyuba (to Akron Tolyatti)
11	MF	RUS	Anton Miranchuk (to (Switzerland) Sion)
15	MF	RUS	Maksim Glushenkov (to Zenit St. Petersburg)
17	MF	RUS	Rifat Zhemaletdinov (to CSKA Moscow)
21	DF	ALB	Mario Mitaj (on loan to (Saudi Arabia) Al-Ittihad)
23	MF	RUS	Mikhail Shchetinin (on loan to Fakel Voronezh)
51	GK	RUS	Timofey Mitrov (on loan to Shinnik Yaroslavl)
52	GK	RUS	Roland Dzhobava (on loan to Spartak Kostroma)
53	GK	RUS	Daniil Khudyakov (to (Austria) Sturm Graz)
61	DF	RUS	Yevgeny Lukinykh (to Pari Nizhny Novgorod)
80	DF	RUS	Kirill Volkov (on loan to (Belarus) Arsenal Dzerzhinsk)
92	MF	RUS	Timofey Shchelkunov (to Baltika Kaliningrad)
97	FW	BIH	Said Hamulić (end of loan from (France) Toulouse)
—	DF	BLR	Arseniy Ageyev (on loan to (Belarus) Arsenal Dzerzhinsk, previously from Arsenal Dzerzhinsk)
—	DF	CRO	Tin Jedvaj (to (Greece) Panathinaikos, previously on loan)
—	MF	RUS	Ilya Berkovski (to Khimki, previously on loan)
—	MF	RUS	Nikolai Titkov (on loan to Baltika Kaliningrad, previously on loan to Orenburg)
—	FW	FRA	Wilson Isidor (to Zenit St. Petersburg, previously on loan)
—	FW	SUR	Gyrano Kerk (to (Belgium) Royal Antwerp, previously on loan)
—	FW	RUS	Andrey Nikitin (on loan to Arsenal Tula, previously on loan to SKA-Khabarovsk)
—	FW	RUS	Denis Pushkaryov (to Chelyabinsk, previously on loan)
—	FW	MNE	Marko Rakonjac (on loan to (Hungary) Diósgyőr, previously on loan to (Serbia) TSC)

=== Orenburg ===
In: Note: Flags indicate national team as defined under FIFA eligibility rules; some limited exceptions apply. Players may hold more than one non-FIFA nationality.

No.	Pos.	Nation	Player
1	GK	RUS	Bogdan Moskvichyov (on loan from Zenit St. Petersburg)
10	FW	IRI	Saeid Saharkhizan (from (Iran) Gol Gohar)
16	FW	CHI	Jordhy Thompson (from (Chile) Colo-Colo, previously on loan)
18	MF	RUS	Aleksandr Kovalenko (from Zenit St. Petersburg)
19	FW	ECU	Justin Cuero (from (Ecuador) Independiente del Valle, previously on loan)
20	MF	RUS	Dmitri Rybchinsky (from Baltika Kaliningrad)
31	DF	RUS	Georgi Zotov (from Krylia Sovetov Samara)
35	DF	TUR	Kazımcan Karataş (on loan from (Turkey) Galatasaray)
38	DF	RUS	Artyom Kasimov (from Zenit-2 St. Petersburg)
94	MF	RUS	Dmitry Miller (from own Under-19 squad)
96	MF	RUS	Aleksey Baranovsky (from Zenit-2 St. Petersburg)

Out: Note: Flags indicate national team as defined under FIFA eligibility rules; some limited exceptions apply. Players may hold more than one non-FIFA nationality.

No.	Pos.	Nation	Player
2	DF	RUS	Vladimir Poluyakhtov (retired)
3	DF	BLR	Mikhail Sivakow (to SKA Rostov-on-Don)
5	DF	RUS	Leo Goglichidze (end of loan from Ural Yekaterinburg)
6	DF	RUS	Arsen Adamov (end of loan from Zenit St. Petersburg)
10	FW	RUS	Dmitry Vorobyov (to Lokomotiv Moscow)
13	FW	RUS	Vladimir Obukhov
15	DF	BIH	Renato Gojković (to (Israel) Maccabi Petah Tikva)
23	MF	ARG	Lucas Vera (to Khimki)
31	MF	RUS	Danila Knyazev (to Avangard Kursk)
38	MF	RUS	Nikolai Titkov (end of loan from Lokomotiv Moscow)
95	GK	RUS	Andrey Khodanovich (on loan to Chayka Peschanokopskoye)
—	DF	BLR	Aleksandr Pavlovets (to Ararat-Armenia, previously on loan to (Cyprus) Karmiotissa)
—	MF	RUS	Yevgeni Bolotov (to Rotor Volgograd, previously on loan to Tyumen)
—	MF	RUS	Danil Kapustyansky (on loan to Amkar Perm, previously on loan to Ufa)

=== Pari Nizhny Novgorod ===
In: Note: Flags indicate national team as defined under FIFA eligibility rules; some limited exceptions apply. Players may hold more than one non-FIFA nationality.

No.	Pos.	Nation	Player
7	MF	RUS	Vladislav Karapuzov (from Dynamo Moscow, previously on loan)
15	DF	RUS	Aleksandr Ektov (on loan from Krasnodar)
17	FW	RUS	Stanislav Lapinsky (from Zenit St. Petersburg)
18	MF	ISR	Dan Glazer (from (Greece) OFI Crete)
19	MF	RUS	Nikita Yermakov (from CSKA Moscow, previously on loan)
25	DF	SLO	Sven Karič (from (Slovenia) Maribor)
29	MF	SLO	Luka Vešner Tičić (from (Slovenia) Koper)
30	GK	RUS	Nikita Medvedev (from Rostov)
52	DF	RUS	Artyom Chistyakov (from CSKA Moscow academy)
54	MF	RUS	Daniil Yakunchikov (from Pari NN-2 Nizhny Novgorod)
61	DF	RUS	Yevgeny Lukinykh (from Lokomotiv Moscow)
90	FW	SRB	Ognjen Ožegović (from (Greece) A.E. Kifisia)
99	MF	RUS	Stanislav Magkeyev (from Lokomotiv Moscow)
—	MF	RUS	David Kobesov (end of loan to Alania Vladikavkaz)

Out: Note: Flags indicate national team as defined under FIFA eligibility rules; some limited exceptions apply. Players may hold more than one non-FIFA nationality.

No.	Pos.	Nation	Player
17	DF	RUS	Mikhail Tikhonov (to Yenisey Krasnoyarsk)
18	MF	RUS	Konstantin Kuchayev (to Rostov)
25	GK	RUS	Artur Nigmatullin (to Rubin Kazan)
44	FW	RUS	Ilya Kukharchuk (on loan to Rotor Volgograd)
89	DF	RUS	Dmitry Stotsky (to Ufa)
—	MF	RUS	Ivan Sutugin (to Khimik Dzerzhinsk, previously on loan to Veles Moscow)
—	FW	RUS	Timur Suleymanov (to Lokomotiv Moscow, previously on loan)

=== Rostov ===
In: Note: Flags indicate national team as defined under FIFA eligibility rules; some limited exceptions apply. Players may hold more than one non-FIFA nationality.

No.	Pos.	Nation	Player
1	GK	TJK	Rustam Yatimov (from (Tajikistan) Istiklol)
3	DF	NIG	Oumar Sako (from (Bulgaria) Arda Kardzhali, previously on loan)
11	MF	RUS	Aleksei Sutormin (on loan from Zenit St. Petersburg)
13	GK	BIH	Hidajet Hankić (from (Bulgaria) Botev Plovdiv)
18	MF	RUS	Konstantin Kuchayev (from Pari Nizhny Novgorod)
23	FW	RUS	Roman Tugarev (end of loan to Torpedo Moscow)
71	GK	RUS	Daniil Odoyevsky (on loan from Zenit St. Petersburg)
77	MF	RUS	Stepan Melnikov (end of loan to Alania Vladikavkaz)
89	MF	URU	Rodrigo Saravia (from (Uruguay) Peñarol)

Out: Note: Flags indicate national team as defined under FIFA eligibility rules; some limited exceptions apply. Players may hold more than one non-FIFA nationality.

No.	Pos.	Nation	Player
1	GK	RUS	Nikita Medvedev (to Pari Nizhny Novgorod)
5	DF	RUS	Denis Terentyev (to Baltika Kaliningrad)
30	GK	RUS	Sergei Pesyakov (to Krylia Sovetov Samara)
44	DF	RUS	Ilya Kirsh (end of loan from Zenit St. Petersburg)
47	MF	RUS	Daniil Utkin (on loan to Akhmat Grozny)
64	DF	RUS	David Semenchuk (to Arsenal Tula)
93	GK	RUS	Yaroslav Solovyov (on loan to Tekstilshchik Ivanovo)
—	GK	RUS	Aleksandr Dyachkov (on loan to Chernomorets Novorossiysk, previously on loan to Mashuk-KMV Pyatigorsk)
—	GK	RUS	Aleksandr Grigoryev (on loan to Leningradets Leningrad Oblast, previously on loan to Tekstilshchik Ivanovo)
—	DF	RUS	Nikita Kotin (on loan to Dynamo Makhachkala, previously on loan to Shinnik Yaroslavl)
—	DF	RUS	Nikolai Poyarkov (on loan to SKA-Khabarovsk, previously on loan to Fakel Voronezh)
—	MF	BIH	Armin Gigović (to (Germany) Holstein Kiel, previously on loan to (Denmark) Midtjylland)
—	MF	NOR	Magnus Knudsen (to (Germany) Holstein Kiel, previously on loan to (Denmark) AGF)
—	FW	SWE	Pontus Almqvist (to (Italy) Parma, previously on loan to (Italy) Lecce)
—	FW	GAM	Ali Sowe (on loan to (Turkey) Çaykur Rizespor, previously on loan to (Turkey) Ankaragücü)
—	FW	RUS	Maksim Turishchev (to Arsenal Tula, previously on loan to Rodina Moscow)

=== Rubin Kazan ===
In: Note: Flags indicate national team as defined under FIFA eligibility rules; some limited exceptions apply. Players may hold more than one non-FIFA nationality.

No.	Pos.	Nation	Player
7	MF	AUT	Aleksandar Jukić (from Sochi)
20	FW	GHA	Joel Fameyeh (end of loan to Baltika Kaliningrad)
22	MF	CRO	Veldin Hodža (from (Croatia) Rijeka)
25	GK	RUS	Artur Nigmatullin (from Pari Nizhny Novgorod)
38	GK	RUS	Yevgeni Staver (from Yenisey Krasnoyarsk)
39	GK	RUS	Ilya Yezhov (from own Under-19 squad)
71	DF	RUS	Konstantin Nizhegorodov (end of loan to Arsenal Tula)
77	FW	RUS	Daniil Kuznetsov (end of loan to Rodina Moscow)
87	FW	RUS	Enri Mukba (from Rubin-2 Kazan)
90	FW	ALB	Marvin Çuni (from (Italy) Frosinone)
96	MF	RUS	Nikita Vasilyev (from Rubin-2 Kazan)
97	FW	RUS	Daniil Motorin (from Rubin-2 Kazan)

Out: Note: Flags indicate national team as defined under FIFA eligibility rules; some limited exceptions apply. Players may hold more than one non-FIFA nationality.

No.	Pos.	Nation	Player
4	DF	BLR	Alyaksandr Martynovich (to (Kazakhstan) Kairat)
7	FW	SRB	Lazar Ranđelović (end of loan from (Greece) Olympiacos)
10	MF	SUI	Darko Jevtić (to (Serbia) Jedinstvo Ub)
22	GK	RUS	Yury Dyupin (to Krasnodar)
26	DF	SRB	Uroš Drezgić (on loan to (Hungary) Diósgyőr)
31	DF	POL	Maciej Rybus
50	GK	RUS	Yegor Shamov (to Yenisey Krasnoyarsk)
66	GK	RUS	Nikita Yanovich (on loan to Neftekhimik Nizhnekamsk)
77	FW	SRB	Luka Bijelović (end of loan from (Serbia) Spartak Subotica)
88	FW	BLR	Vitaly Lisakovich (to Baltika Kaliningrad, previously on loan)
—	DF	RUS	Lenar Fattakhov (released, previously on loan to Kuban Krasnodar)
—	MF	RUS	Daniil Rodin (on loan to Neftekhimik Nizhnekamsk, previously on loan to KAMAZ Naberezhnye Chelny)
—	MF	RUS	Mikhail Kostyukov (to SKA-Khabarovsk, previously on loan to Dynamo Makhachkala)
—	MF	RUS	Leon Musayev (to Rodina Moscow, previously on loan to Kuban Krasnodar)
—	FW	RUS	Soltmurad Bakayev (to Akron Tolyatti, previously on loan to Rodina Moscow)

=== Spartak Moscow ===
In: Note: Flags indicate national team as defined under FIFA eligibility rules; some limited exceptions apply. Players may hold more than one non-FIFA nationality.

No.	Pos.	Nation	Player
5	MF	ARG	Esequiel Barco (from (Argentina) River Plate)
8	FW	BRA	Marquinhos (from (Hungary) Ferencváros)
11	FW	JAM	Shamar Nicholson (end of loan to (France) Clermont)
12	FW	BRA	Willian José (from (Spain) Real Betis)
14	DF	SUR	Myenty Abena (from (Hungary) Ferencváros)
16	GK	RUS	Aleksandr Dovbnya (from Shinnik Yaroslavl)
29	DF	POR	Ricardo Mangas (from (Portugal) Vitória de Guimarães)
37	MF	RUS	Ivan Starkov (from Spartak-2 Moscow)
38	MF	RUS	Yegor Gulyayev (from Spartak-2 Moscow)
54	MF	RUS	Daniil Lukin (from Spartak-2 Moscow)
60	MF	RUS	Abdullo Dzhebov (from Spartak-2 Moscow)
87	FW	RUS	Arseny Filev (from Zvezda St. Petersburg)
89	FW	RUS	Viktor Solopov (from own academy)
94	FW	RUS	Aleksandr Pomalyuk (from Chertanovo)

Out: Note: Flags indicate national team as defined under FIFA eligibility rules; some limited exceptions apply. Players may hold more than one non-FIFA nationality.

No.	Pos.	Nation	Player
5	DF	RUS	Leon Klassen (to (Denmark) Lyngby)
7	FW	RUS	Aleksandr Sobolev (to Zenit St. Petersburg)
8	MF	NGR	Victor Moses (to (England) Luton Town)
10	FW	NED	Quincy Promes (to (United Arab Emirates) United)
14	DF	RUS	Georgi Dzhikiya (to Khimki)
20	DF	POR	Tomás Tavares (on loan to (Austria) LASK)
39	DF	RUS	Pavel Maslov (on loan to Sochi)
50	MF	RUS	Maksim Nikiforov (to Murom)
61	DF	RUS	Nikita Bozov (to Baltika Kaliningrad)
62	FW	RUS	Maksim Ofitserov (on loan to Torpedo Miass)
70	FW	RUS	Pavel Melyoshin (on loan to Sochi, previously on loan to (Belarus) Dinamo Minsk)
88	GK	RUS	Ilya Svinov (to Baltika Kaliningrad)
81	GK	RUS	Anton Roshchin (on loan to Metallurg Lipetsk)
—	DF	RUS	Yaroslav Krashevsky (to Khimik Dzerzhinsk, previously on loan to Rotor Volgograd)
—	DF	RUS	Nikolai Tolstopyatov (on loan to Neftekhimik Nizhnekamsk, previously on loan to Sokol Saratov)
—	DF	RUS	Maksim Vedeneyev (to Kuban Krasnodar, previously on loan)
—	MF	CZE	Alex Král (to (Germany) Union Berlin, previously on loan)
—	MF	RUS	Maksim Laykin (on loan to Yenisey Krasnoyarsk, previously on loan to Arsenal Tula)
—	MF	RUS	Konstantin Shiltsov (to Neftekhimik Nizhnekamsk, previously on loan)
—	FW	SEN	Keita Baldé (to (Turkey) Sivasspor, previously on loan to (Spain) Espanyol)
—	FW	RUS	Igor Dmitriyev (on loan to Krylia Sovetov Samara, previously from Ural Yekaterinburg)
—	FW	RUS	Vitali Shitov (on loan to Torpedo Moscow, previously on loan to Tyumen)

=== Zenit Saint Petersburg ===
In: Note: Flags indicate national team as defined under FIFA eligibility rules; some limited exceptions apply. Players may hold more than one non-FIFA nationality.

No.	Pos.	Nation	Player
1	GK	RUS	Yevgeni Latyshonok (from Baltika Kaliningrad)
2	DF	RUS	Dmitri Chistyakov (end of loan to Sochi)
4	DF	RUS	Yuri Gorshkov (from Krylia Sovetov Samara)
7	FW	RUS	Aleksandr Sobolev (from Spartak Moscow)
32	FW	ARG	Luciano Gondou (from (Argentina) Argentinos Juniors)
67	MF	RUS	Maksim Glushenkov (from Lokomotiv Moscow)
69	FW	RUS	Artur Maksimchuk (from Metallurg Lipetsk)
73	DF	RUS	Kirill Dontsov (on loan from Rotor Volgograd)
80	DF	RUS	Ilya Bulygin
82	DF	RUS	Sergei Volkov (from Krasnodar)
83	MF	RUS	Kirill Stolbov (end of loan to Chernomorets Novorossiysk, previously on loan to Rostov)
96	FW	RUS	Denis Rubanov (on loan from Sochi)
98	GK	RUS	Maksim Timofeyev

Out: Note: Flags indicate national team as defined under FIFA eligibility rules; some limited exceptions apply. Players may hold more than one non-FIFA nationality.

No.	Pos.	Nation	Player
1	GK	RUS	Aleksandr Vasyutin (to Akron Tolyatti)
4	DF	RUS	Danil Krugovoy (to CSKA Moscow)
6	DF	RUS	Mário Fernandes
7	MF	RUS	Zelimkhan Bakayev (on loan to Khimki, previously on loan to (United Arab Emirates) Al Wahda)
10	FW	FRA	Wilson Isidor (on loan to (England) Sunderland, previously from Lokomotiv Moscow, previously on loan)
18	MF	RUS	Aleksandr Kovalenko (to Orenburg)
19	MF	RUS	Aleksei Sutormin (on loan to Rostov, previously on loan to Sochi)
33	FW	RUS	Ivan Sergeyev (to Krylia Sovetov Samara)
53	DF	RUS	Matvey Bardachyov (on loan to Ural Yekaterinburg)
56	FW	RUS	Aleksey Kolyshev
58	MF	RUS	Roman Nogtev
60	FW	RUS	Igor Bugayenko (to Khimik Dzerzhinsk)
80	DF	RUS	Artemy Kosogorov (to Shinnik Yaroslavl)
83	FW	RUS	Akim Belokhonov (to Rodina-2 Moscow)
89	FW	RUS	Stanislav Lapinsky (to Pari Nizhny Novgorod)
96	FW	RUS	Aleksey Baranovsky (to Orenburg)
98	DF	RUS	Stefan Kalinov
—	GK	RUS	Nikita Goylo (on loan to Dynamo Makhachkala, previously on loan to Sochi)
—	GK	RUS	Bogdan Moskvichyov (on loan to Orenburg, previously on loan to Chayka Peschanokopskoye)
—	GK	RUS	Daniil Odoyevsky (on loan to Rostov, previously on loan to Volgar Astrakhan)
—	DF	RUS	Arsen Adamov (on loan to Akhmat Grozny, previously on loan to Orenburg)
—	DF	SLO	Vanja Drkušić (on loan to (Serbia) Red Star Belgrade, previously from Sochi)
—	DF	RUS	Ilya Kirsh (on loan to Dynamo Makhachkala, previously on loan to Rostov)
—	DF	BLR	Ilya Moskalenchik (to Alania Vladikavkaz, previously on loan to Tyumen)
—	DF	BRA	Robert Renan (on loan to (Saudi Arabia) Al Shabab, previously on loan to (Brazil) Internacional)
—	DF	RUS	Damir Shaykhtdinov (to Rodina Moscow, previously on loan to Volgar Astrakhan)
—	MF	RUS	Ilya Rodionov (to Chernomorets Novorossiysk, previously on loan)
—	MF	RUS	Vladislav Saus (to Baltika Kaliningrad, previously on loan to Shinnik Yaroslavl)
