= 2022–23 FC Zenit Saint Petersburg season =

Zenit season Page

Zenit Saint Petersburg
2022–23 season
- Owner: Gazprom
- President: Alexander Medvedev
- Head coach: Sergei Semak
- Stadium: Krestovsky Stadium
- Premier League: 1st
- Russian Cup: Quarter-finals
- Super Cup: Winners
- UEFA Champions League: Excluded
- Top goalscorer: League: Malcom (23); All: Malcom (26)
- Highest home attendance: 51,174 vs CSKA Moscow (13 August 2022)
- Lowest home attendance: 19,705 vs Nizhny Novgorod (4 March 2023)
- Average home league attendance: 30,790 (12 March 2023)
- Biggest win: 8–0 vs Orenburg, Russian Premier League, 11 September 2022
- Biggest defeat: 0–3 vs Spartak Moscow, Russian Cup, 29 September 2022
Home colours	Away colours

The 2022–23 season was the 98th season in the existence of FC Zenit Saint Petersburg and the club's 27th consecutive season in the top flight of Russian football. In addition to the domestic league, Zenit Saint Petersburg participated in this season's editions of the Russian Cup. The club won the Russian Super Cup before the season with their participation in the UEFA Champions League still on hold due to the ongoing Russian conflict with Ukraine.

== Squad ==
As of match played 3 June 2023

No.	Name	Nationality	Position	Date of birth (age)	Signed from	Signed in	Contract ends	Apps.	Goals
Goalkeepers
1	Aleksandr Vasyutin	(Russia)	GK	4 March 1995 (aged 28)	Sarpsborg 08	2019	2023	7	0
41	Mikhail Kerzhakov	(Russia)	GK	28 January 1987 (aged 36)	Anzhi Makhachkala	2015	2022	115	0
71	Daniil Odoyevsky	(Russia)	GK	22 January 2003 (aged 20)	Academy	2019		11	0
Defenders
2	Dmitri Chistyakov	(Russia)	DF	13 January 1994 (aged 29)	Rostov	2021	2025	74	1
3	Douglas Santos (captain)	(Brazil)	DF	22 March 1994 (aged 29)	Hamburger SV	2019	2026	144	4
4	Danil Krugovoy	(Russia)	DF	28 May 1998 (aged 25)	Ufa	2019	2024	86	1
15	Vyacheslav Karavayev	(Russia)	DF	20 May 1995 (aged 28)	Vitesse	2019	2023	115	4
23	Arsen Adamov	(Russia)	DF	1 October 2002 (aged 20)	Ural Yekaterinburg	2022	2026	20	0
28	Nuraly Alip	(Kazakhstan)	DF	22 December 1999 (aged 23)	Kairat	2023	2025(+1)	25	0
55	Rodrigão	(Brazil)	DF	11 September 1995 (aged 27)	Sochi	2022	2025(+1)	26	1
77	Robert Renan	(Brazil)	DF	11 October 2003 (aged 19)	Corinthians	2023		10	0
Midfielders
5	Wilmar Barrios	(Colombia)	MF	16 October 1993 (aged 29)	Boca Juniors	2019	2026	150	3
7	Zelimkhan Bakayev	(Russia)	MF	1 July 1996 (aged 26)	Spartak Moscow	2022	2025(+1)	26	3
8	Wendel	(Brazil)	MF	28 August 1997 (aged 25)	Sporting CP	2020	2025	88	15
11	Claudinho	(Brazil)	MF	28 January 1997 (aged 26)	Red Bull Bragantino	2021	2026	61	15
14	Daler Kuzyayev	(Russia)	MF	15 January 1993 (aged 30)	Zenit St.Petersburg	2020	2023	182	21
17	Andrei Mostovoy	(Russia)	MF	5 November 1997 (aged 25)	Khimki	2019		108	21
19	Aleksei Sutormin	(Russia)	MF	10 January 1994 (aged 29)	Rubin Kazan	2019	2025	115	12
21	Aleksandr Yerokhin	(Russia)	MF	13 October 1989 (aged 33)	Rostov	2017	2024	192	36
31	Gustavo Mantuan	(Brazil)	MF	20 June 2001 (aged 21)	on loan from Corinthians	2022	2023	29	6
94	Danila Kozlov	(Russia)	MF	19 January 2005 (aged 18)	Academy	2022		3	0
Forwards
10	Malcom	(Brazil)	FW	26 February 1997 (aged 26)	Barcelona	2019	2024	107	42
30	Mateo Cassierra	(Colombia)	FW	13 April 1997 (aged 26)	Sochi	2022	2025(+1)	34	6
33	Ivan Sergeyev	(Russia)	FW	11 May 1995 (aged 28)	Krylia Sovetov	2022	2025	49	19
Away on loan
35	Vladislav Saus	(Russia)	MF	6 August 2003 (aged 19)	Academy	2022		1	0
61	Aleksey Baranovsky	(Russia)	MF	25 January 2005 (aged 18)	Academy	2022		3	0
98	Yaroslav Mikhaylov	(Russia)	MF	28 April 2003 (aged 20)	Academy	2022		1	0
Left during the season
1	Ivan	(Brazil)	GK	7 February 1997 (aged 26)	on loan from Corinthians	2022	2023	4	0
6	Dejan Lovren	(Croatia)	DF	5 July 1989 (aged 33)	Liverpool	2020	2023	63	3
45	Dmitry Sergeyev	(Russia)	MF	3 April 2000 (aged 23)	Academy	2018		2	0
	Daniil Shamkin	(Russia)	MF	22 June 2002 (aged 20)	Academy	2019		9	0
	Yuri Alberto	(Brazil)	FW	18 March 2001 (aged 22)	Internacional	2022	2026	15	6

== Transfers ==
=== In ===
Date	Position	Nationality	Name	From	Fee	Ref.
15 June 2022	MF	(Russia)	Zelimkhan Bakayev	Unattached	Free	
30 June 2022	FW	(Colombia)	Mateo Cassierra	Sochi	Undisclosed	
7 July 2022	DF	(Brazil)	Rodrigão	Sochi	Undisclosed	
14 December 2022	DF	(Kazakhstan)	Nuraly Alip	Kairat	Undisclosed	
10 January 2023	DF	(Brazil)	Robert Renan	Corinthians	Player Swap	
1 July 2023	MF	(Brazil)	Du Queiroz	Corinthians	Player Swap	

=== Loans in ===
Date from	Position	Nationality	Name	From	Date to	Ref.
29 June 2022	MF	(Brazil)	Gustavo Mantuan	Corinthians	30 June 2023	
29 June 2022	GK	(Brazil)	Ivan	Corinthians	10 January 2023	

=== Out ===
Date	Position	Nationality	Name	To	Fee	Ref.
22 July 2022	MF	(Russia)	Kirill Kravtsov	Sochi	Undisclosed	
2 January 2023	DF	(Croatia)	Dejan Lovren	Lyon	Undisclosed	
9 January 2023	DF	(Russia)	Danila Khotulyov	Orenburg	Undisclosed	
10 January 2023	FW	(Brazil)	Yuri Alberto	Corinthians	Player Swap	

=== Loans out ===
Date from	Position	Nationality	Name	To	Date to	Ref.
10 February 2022	DF	(Russia)	Danila Khotulyov	Orenburg	9 January 2023	
29 June 2022	FW	(Brazil)	Yuri Alberto	Corinthians	10 January 2023	
2 July 2022	FW	(Russia)	Daniil Shamkin	KAMAZ	30 June 2023	

== Competitions ==
=== Overall record ===
Competition	First match	Last match	Starting round	Final position	Record							
Competition	First match	Last match	Starting round	Final position	Pld	W	D	L	GF	GA	GD	Win %
Premier League	15 July 2022	3 June 2023	Matchday 1	Winners	30	21	7	2	74	20	+54	70.00
Russian Cup	31 August 2022	15 March 2023	Group stage	Regions Quarterfinal Second Stage	8	4	2	2	10	7	+3	50.00
Super Cup	9 July 2022		Final	Winners	1	1	0	0	4	0	+4	100.00
Total					39	26	9	4	88	27	+61	66.67

Source: Soccerway

=== Super Cup ===
9 July 2022	Zenit St.Petersburg	4–0	Spartak Moscow	Saint Petersburg
19:00 MSK (UTC+3)	Sergeyev 29'; Malcom 34'; Wendel 47'; Barrios (yellow card) 89'; Cassiera 90+'	Report	Chernov (yellow card) 57'; Nicholson (yellow card) 89'	Stadium: Gazprom Arena; Attendance: 55,608; Referee: Vladimir Moskalyov

=== Premier League ===
==== League table ====
Pos	Team	Pld	W	D	L	GF	GA	GD	Pts
1	Zenit Saint Petersburg (C)	30	21	7	2	74	20	+54	70
2	CSKA Moscow	30	17	7	6	56	27	+29	58
3	Spartak Moscow	30	15	9	6	60	38	+22	54
4	Rostov	30	15	8	7	48	44	+4	53
5	Akhmat Grozny	30	15	5	10	51	39	+12	50

Source: Premier Liga
Rules for classification: 1) Points; 2) Head-to-head points; 3) Head-to-head matches won; 4) Head-to-head goal difference; 5) Head-to-head goals scored; 6) Matches won; 7) Goal difference; 8) Goals scored; 9) 2021–22 position (not applicable to final standings); 10) Play-off.
(C) Champions

==== Results summary ====
Overall								Home						Away					
Pld	W	D	L	GF	GA	GD	Pts	W	D	L	GF	GA	GD	W	D	L	GF	GA	GD
30	21	7	2	74	20	+54	70	13	1	1	48	11	+37	8	6	1	26	9	+17

Source: See Results

==== Results ====
15 July 2022 1	Khimki	1–1	Zenit St.Petersburg	Khimki
20:00 MSK (UTC+3)	Bozhenov (yellow card) 44'; Mirzov 84'	Report	Wendel 17'; Sutormin (yellow card) 67'	Stadium: Arena Khimki; Attendance: 4,028; Referee: Evgeny Kukulyak

22 July 2022 2	Zenit St.Petersburg	3-0	Krylia Sovetov Samara	Saint Petersburg
20:00 MSK (UTC+3)	Mostovoy (penalty missed) 5' 5', 31'; Kuzyayev 12' (pen.)	Report	Gorshkov (yellow card) 26'; Soldatenkov (yellow card) 29'; Gaponov (yellow card) 39'	Stadium: Krestovsky Stadium; Attendance: 26,701; Referee: Artem Chistyakov

30 July 2022 3	Zenit St.Petersburg	5-0	Lokomotiv Moscow	Saint Petersburg
17:30 MSK (UTC+3)	Wendel 63'; Claudinho 75'; Sergeyev 80', 90+3'; Bakayev 90+1' (pen.)	Report	Kamano (yellow card) 44'; Tiknizyan (yellow card) 81'; Barinov (red card) 90'	Stadium: Krestovsky Stadium; Attendance: 35,163; Referee: Sergei Karasev

6 August 2022 4	Akhmat Grozny	0-0	Zenit St.Petersburg	Grozny
20:00 MSK (UTC+3)	Troshechkin (yellow card) 11'; Sadulayev (yellow card) 45+'; Nižić (yellow card) 48'; Timofeyev (yellow card) 81'; Shvets (yellow card) 89'	Report	Lovren (yellow card) 32'; Sutormin (yellow card) 36'; Odoyevsky (red card) 41'	Stadium: Akhmat-Arena; Attendance: 9,620; Referee: Sergey Ivanov

13 August 2022 5	Zenit St.Petersburg	2-1	CSKA Moscow	Saint Petersburg
17:00 MSK (UTC+3)	Malcom 45+2'; Barrios (yellow card) 62' Mantuan 85' (yellow card) 90+'	Report	Kuchayev (yellow card) 38'; Akinfeev (yellow card) 54'; Mukhin (yellow card) 54'; Nababkin (yellow card) 62'; Chalov 63' (pen.); Zdjelar (yellow card) 84'	Stadium: Krestovsky Stadium; Attendance: 51,174; Referee: Pavel Kukuyan

21 August 2022 6	Zenit St.Petersburg	2-0	Torpedo Moscow	Saint Petersburg
17:30 MSK (UTC+3)	Sergeyev 84'; Malcom 87'	Report	Samsonov (yellow card) 27'; Pomerko (yellow card) 35'	Stadium: Krestovsky Stadium; Attendance: 33,158; Referee: Aleksey Sukhoy

28 August 2022 7	Ural Yekaterinburg	0-4	Zenit St.Petersburg	Yekaterinburg
15:00 MSK (UTC+3)	Bicfalvi (yellow card) 2'; Gerasimov (yellow card) 19'; Kashtanov (yellow card) 24'	Report	Malcom 50', 60' (yellow card) 76'; Mostovoy 54'; Rodrigão 72'	Stadium: Ekaterinburg Arena; Attendance: 8,538; Referee: Pavel Shadykhanov

4 September 2022 8	Spartak Moscow	1-2	Zenit St.Petersburg	Moscow
20:00 MSK (UTC+3)	Sobolev 21'; Promes (yellow card) 42'; Rybus (yellow card) 89'; Dzhikiya (yellow card) FT	Report	Wendel (yellow card) 42'; Lovren 48'; Mostovoy 60'; Rodrigão (yellow card) 62'	Stadium: Otkritie Arena; Attendance: 14,950; Referee: Pavel Kukuyan

11 September 2022 9	Zenit St.Petersburg	8-0	Orenburg	Saint Petersburg
17:30 MSK (UTC+3)	Wendel 3', 43', 68'; Kuzyayev (yellow card) 10'; Sergeyev 17'; Kuzyayev 19'; Malcom 29', 59'; Pavlovets 51' (o.g.)	Report	Ektov (yellow card) 22'; Vera (yellow card) 56'; Poluyakhtov (yellow card) 78'; Bašić (yellow card) 86'	Stadium: Krestovsky Stadium; Attendance: 30,943; Referee: Evgeny Turbin

17 September 2022 10	Dynamo Moscow	0-2	Zenit St.Petersburg	Moscow
19:00 MSK (UTC+3)	Laxalt (yellow card) 32'; Fernández (yellow card) 43' (yellow-red card) 64'; Zakharyan (yellow card) 69'; Skopintsev (yellow card) 79'	Report	Santos (yellow card) 14'; Mostovoy 35'; Mantuan 90+3'	Stadium: VTB Arena; Attendance: 22,721; Referee: Sergei Karasev

2 October 2022 11	Zenit St.Petersburg	3-1	Rostov	Saint Petersburg
16:30 MSK (UTC+3)	Malcom 14'; Wendel 65'; Kuzyayev 77'	Report	Komlichenko 47'	Stadium: Krestovsky Stadium; Attendance: 40,346; Referee: Vladimir Moskalyov

8 October 2022 12	Fakel Voronezh	1-1	Zenit St.Petersburg	Voronezh
14:00 MSK (UTC+3)	Gongadze 12'; Suslov (yellow card) 36'	Report	Malcom 28'	Stadium: Tsentralnyi Profsoyuz Stadion; Attendance: 15,967; Referee: Pavel Kukuyan

16 October 2022 13	Pari Nizhny Novgorod	0-3	Zenit St.Petersburg	Nizhny Novgorod
16:30 MSK (UTC+3)		Report	Kuzyayev 22'; Claudinho 45'; Karavayev (yellow card) 51'; Malcom 65'	Stadium: Nizhny Novgorod Stadium; Attendance: 16,286; Referee: Artem Chistyakov

24 October 2022 14	Zenit St.Petersburg	7-0	Sochi	Saint Petersburg
20:00 MSK (UTC+3)	Sergeyev 2', 25'; Malcom 11', 74'; Wendel 32'; Barrios 53'; Mantuan 76'	Report	Meshchaninov (red card) 20'	Stadium: Krestovsky Stadium; Attendance: 20,184; Referee: Evgeny Kukulyak

30 October 2022 15	Krasnodar	0-1	Zenit St.Petersburg	Krasnodar
19:30 MSK (UTC+3)	Spertsyan (yellow card) 39'; Volkov (yellow card) 47'; Petrov (yellow card) 69'; Ramírez (yellow card) 82'	Report	Alip (yellow card) 43'; Kuzyayev (yellow card) 79' (goal) 87' (pen.)	Stadium: Krasnodar Stadium; Attendance: 33,757; Referee: Vladimir Moskalyov

5 November 2022 16	Zenit St.Petersburg	1-2	Akhmat Grozny	Saint Petersburg
16:30 MSK (UTC+3)	Mostovoy 65'; Douglas (yellow card) 87'	Report	Kharin 1'; Konaté 8'; Timofeyev (yellow card) 46'	Stadium: Krestovsky Stadium; Attendance: 34,565; Referee: Pavel Kukuyan

12 November 2022 17	Torpedo Moscow	0-2	Zenit St.Petersburg	Moscow
16:30 MSK (UTC+3)	Samsonov (yellow card) 43'; Le Tallec (yellow card) 78'	Report	Malcom 70'; Claudinho 81'	Stadium: Luzhniki Stadium; Attendance: 7,888; Referee: Sergei Karasev

4 March 2023 18	Zenit St.Petersburg	3-0	Pari Nizhny Novgorod	Saint Petersburg
16:30 MSK (UTC+3)	Malcom 12', 47'; Kuzyayev (penalty missed) 38'; Yerokhin 82'	Report	Stotsky (yellow card) 25'	Stadium: Krestovsky Stadium; Attendance: 19,705; Referee: Roman Galimov

12 March 2023 19	Zenit St.Petersburg	3-2	Khimki	Saint Petersburg
13:00 MSK (UTC+3)	Malcom 19', 55'; Kerzhakov (yellow card) 84'; Mantuan 90+1' (yellow card) 90+'	Report	Melentijević (yellow card) 50'; Magomedov 75', 86' (pen.); Idowu (yellow card) 79'	Stadium: Krestovsky Stadium; Attendance: 15,965; Referee: Artur Fedorov

19 March 2023 20	CSKA Moscow	1-0	Zenit St.Petersburg	Moscow
18:30 MSK (UTC+3)	Willyan (yellow card) 54'; Chalov 72'	Report	Rodrigão (yellow card) 37'	Stadium: VEB Arena; Attendance: 9,974; Referee: Sergei Karasev

1 April 2023 21	Zenit St.Petersburg	2–0	Ural Yekaterinburg	Saint Petersburg
19:00 MSK (UTC+3)	Sergeyev 75', 86'; Wendel (yellow card) 79'	Report	Kulakov (yellow card) 42'	Stadium: Krestovsky Stadium; Attendance: 23,966; Referee: Artem Chistyakov

9 April 2023 22	Lokomotiv Moscow	1–2	Zenit St.Petersburg	Moscow
20:00 MSK (UTC+3)	Glushenkov 26'; Nenakhov (yellow card) 31'	Report	Wendel 40'; Cassierra 77'; Rodrigão (yellow card) 90+5'	Stadium: RZD Arena; Attendance: 10,859; Referee: Pavel Kukuian

16 April 2023 23	Rostov	0-0	Zenit St.Petersburg	Rostov-on-Don
19:00 MSK (UTC+3)	Mironov (yellow card) 38'; Silyanov (yellow card) 41'; Komarov (yellow card) 74'	Report	Claudinho (yellow card) 32'	Stadium: Rostov Arena; Attendance: 13,711; Referee: Sergei Karasev

22 April 2023 24	Zenit St.Petersburg	3–1	Dynamo Moscow	Saint Petersburg
19:00 MSK (UTC+3)	Malcom 45+1' (pen.), 68'; Mostovoy 87'	Report	Gladyshev (yellow card) 77'; Fomin 80'	Stadium: Krestovsky Stadium; Attendance: 27,724; Referee: Vitali Meshkov

29 April 2023 25	Krylia Sovetov Samara	1–5	Zenit St.Petersburg	Samara
14:00 MSK (UTC+3)	Babkin 9'; Bijl (yellow card) 18' (yellow-red card) 41'; Tsypchenko (yellow card) 39'; Rasskazov (yellow card) 51'; Rahmanović (yellow card) 72'	Report	Malcom 19' (pen.), 55', 68', 74'; Claudinho 30'	Stadium: Solidarnost Arena; Attendance: 9,612; Referee: Sergey Ivanov

7 May 2023 26	Zenit St.Petersburg	3–2	Spartak Moscow	Saint Petersburg
18:00 MSK (UTC+3)	Claudinho 13'; Mostovoy 40'; Wendel (yellow card) 74'; Chistyakov (yellow card) 84'; Sergeyev 90+'; Kerzhakov (yellow card) 90+'	Report	Baldé 33'; Zinkovsky (yellow card) 35'; Chernov (yellow card) 50'; Duarte (red card) 75'; Promes 85' (pen.)	Stadium: Krestovsky Stadium; Attendance: 44,704; Referee: Pavel Kukuyan

13 May 2023 27	Zenit St.Petersburg	2–2	Krasnodar	Saint Petersburg
16:30 MSK (UTC+3)	Malcom 15'; Claudinho (yellow card) 78'; Kuzyayev (yellow card) 84'; Cassierra 90+'; Krugovoy (yellow card) 90+'	Report	Cobnan (yellow card) 29'; Banjac 51'; Ionov 58'	Stadium: Krestovsky Stadium; Attendance: 25,508; Referee: Roman Safyan

20 May 2023 28	Orenburg	2–2	Zenit St.Petersburg	Orenburg
16:30 MSK (UTC+3)	Ektov 41'; Mansilla (yellow card) 58'; Gojković 62'; Sivakow (yellow card) 85'	Report	Barrios (yellow card) 8'; Mantuan 28'; Chistyakov (yellow card) 60'; Claudinho (yellow card) 76'; Sergeyev 90+'	Stadium: Gazovik Stadium; Attendance: 5,653; Referee: Aleksey Sukhoy

27 May 2023 29	Sochi	1–1	Zenit St.Petersburg	Sochi
19:00 MSK (UTC+3)	Yusupov 1'; Terekhov (yellow card) 13'; Joãozinho (yellow card) 84'	Report	Mantuan 50'	Stadium: Fisht Olympic Stadium; Attendance: 5,049; Referee: Rafael Shafeev

3 June 2023 30	Zenit St.Petersburg	1–0	Fakel Voronezh	Saint Petersburg
17:00 MSK (UTC+3)	Yerokhin	Report	Kalinin (yellow card) 54'	Stadium: Krestovsky Stadium; Attendance: 30,594; Referee: Artem Chistyakov

=== Russian Cup ===
On 12 August 2022, the Russian Football Union announced a new format with modifications to both the group and knockout phases. As Zenit have previously been involved in European completion, the new format change marked the club's first participation in the (now-expanded) group stage since its addition to the competition in 2020.

==== Group stage ====
Pos	Team	Pld	W	PW	PL	L	GF	GA	GD	Pts	Qualification
1	Spartak Moscow	6	4	0	1	1	10	3	+7	13	Qualification to the Knockout phase (RPL path)
2	Krylya Sovetov Samara	6	4	0	0	2	7	4	+3	12	Qualification to the Knockout phase (RPL path)
3	Zenit Saint Petersburg	6	3	1	0	2	6	6	0	11	Qualification to the Knockout phase (regions path)
4	Fakel Voronezh	6	0	0	0	6	1	11	−10	0	

Source: Russian Football Union (in Russian), Soccerway
Rules for classification: 1) Points; 2) Head-to-head points; 3) Head-to-head matches won; 4) Head-to-head goal difference; 5) Head-to-head goals scored; 6) Matches won; 7) Goal difference; 8) Goals scored; 9) Penalty shoot-out goal difference; 10) Draw.

31 August 2022 1	Zenit St.Petersburg	2–0	Fakel Voronezh	Saint Petersburg
19:00 MSK (UTC+3)	Cassierra 23', 33'; Bakayev (yellow card) 62'	Report	Chernyakov (yellow card) 13'; Dashayev (yellow card) 60'; Morozov (yellow card) 69'	Stadium: Krestovsky Stadium; Attendance: 15,156; Referee: Aleksey Amelin

14 September 2022 2	Krylya Sovetov Samara	2–0	Zenit St.Petersburg	Samara
17:30 MSK (UTC+3)	Gorshkov (yellow card) 4'; Tsypchenko (yellow card) 74' (goal) 83'; Glushenkov 90+2'	Report	Claudinho (yellow card) 74' (yellow-red card) 76'; Yerokhin (yellow card) 76'	Stadium: Solidarnost Samara Arena; Attendance: 8,496; Referee: Evgeny Kukulyak

29 September 2022 3	Spartak Moscow	3–0	Zenit St.Petersburg	Moscow
20:30 MSK (UTC+3)	Sobolev (yellow card) 22' (goal) 86'; Promes (yellow card) 45' (goal) 79', 90+5'	Report	Lovren (yellow card) 31'; Wendel (yellow card) 31'; Malcom (yellow card) 45+1'; Alip (yellow card) 84'	Stadium: Otkritie Arena; Attendance: 7,360; Referee: Vitali Meshkov

20 October 2022 4	Zenit St.Petersburg	2–1	Krylya Sovetov Samara	Saint Petersburg
20:30 MSK (UTC+3)	Sergeyev 17', 46'; Rodrigão (yellow card) 82'	Report	Vityugov (yellow card) 19'; Ćirković 79'	Stadium: Krestovsky Stadium; Attendance: 16,080; Referee: Sergey Ivanov

16 November 2022 5	Fakel Voronezh	0–2	Zenit St.Petersburg	Voronezh
18:00 MSK (UTC+3)	Chernyakov (yellow card) 24'; Akbashev (yellow card) 25'; Masternoy (yellow card) 85'	Report	Malcom 46', 82'; Adamov (yellow card) 87'	Stadium: Tsentralnyi Profsoyuz Stadion; Attendance: 12,067; Referee: Pavel Shadykhanov

27 November 2022 6	Zenit St.Petersburg	0–0 (4–2 p)	Spartak Moscow	Saint Petersburg
16:00 MSK (UTC+3)	Rodrigão (yellow card) 74' (red card) 90+5'; Kuzyayev (yellow card) 74'; Yerokhin (yellow card) 88'; Barrios (yellow card) 90+4' (red card) 90+5'; Malcom (red card) 90+5'	Report	Dzhikiya (yellow card) 60'; Prutsev (yellow card) 63'; Klassen (yellow card) 65'; Nicholson (yellow card) 74' (red card) 90+5'; Zobnin (yellow card) 74'; Rybus (yellow card) 87'; Selikhov (red card) 90+5'; Sobolev (red card) 90+5'	Stadium: Krestovsky Stadium; Attendance: 51,813; Referee: Vladimir Moskalyov
	Penalties
	Kuzyayev (penalty scored); Mantuan (penalty scored); Mostovoy (penalty scored); Santos (penalty missed); Bakayev (penalty scored)		(penalty scored) Khlusevich; (penalty missed) Zinkovsky; (penalty scored) Litvinov; (penalty missed) Denisov

==== Knockout stage ====
25 February 2023 Regions path Quarter-final Stage 1	Volga Ulyanovsk	0–3	Zenit St.Petersburg	Ulyanovsk
14:30 MSK (UTC+3)	Rakhmanov (yellow card) 59'	Report	Bakayev 33'; Kuzyayev (yellow card) 63'; Cassierra 78'; Sergeyev 90+1'	Stadium: Trud Stadium; Attendance: 7,900; Referee: Aleksey Sukhoy

15 March 2023 Regions path Quarter-final Stage 2	Zenit St.Petersburg	1–1 (a.e.t.) (4–5 p)	Dynamo Moscow	Saint Petersburg
20:00 MSK (UTC+3)	Bakayev 37' (yellow card) 71'; Kuzyayev (yellow card) 79'	Report	Ngamaleu 1'; Skopintsev (yellow card) 76'	Stadium: Krestovsky Stadium; Attendance: 31,087; Referee: Yevgeniy Kukulyak
	Penalties
	Adamov (penalty scored); Sutormin (penalty scored); Mostovoy (penalty scored); Kuzyayev (penalty missed); Claudinho (penalty scored); Santos (penalty missed)		(penalty scored) Fomin; (penalty missed) Grulyov; (penalty scored) Normann; (penalty scored) Lesovoy; (penalty scored) Gagnidze; (penalty scored) Dasa

== Squad statistics ==
As of match played 3 June 2023

=== Appearances and goals ===
No.	Pos	Nat	Player	Total		Premier League		Russian Cup		Super Cup	
No.	Pos	Nat	Player	Apps	Goals	Apps	Goals	Apps	Goals	Apps	Goals
1	GK	(Russia) RUS	Aleksandr Vasyutin	4	0	3	0	1	0	0	0
2	DF	(Russia) RUS	Dmitri Chistyakov	23	0	9+6	0	7	0	1	0
3	DF	(Brazil) BRA	Douglas Santos	36	0	27+1	0	7	0	1	0
4	DF	(Russia) RUS	Danil Krugovoy	27	0	5+14	0	4+3	0	0+1	0
5	MF	(Colombia) COL	Wilmar Barrios	31	1	27+1	1	2	0	1	0
7	MF	(Russia) RUS	Zelimkhan Bakayev	26	3	1+16	1	5+3	2	0+1	0
8	MF	(Brazil) BRA	Wendel	33	9	24+1	8	5+2	0	1	1
10	FW	(Brazil) BRA	Malcom	33	26	27	23	3+2	2	1	1
11	MF	(Brazil) BRA	Claudinho	30	5	19+5	5	5	0	1	0
14	MF	(Russia) RUS	Daler Kuzyayev	35	5	22+4	5	6+2	0	1	0
15	DF	(Russia) RUS	Vyacheslav Karavayev	30	0	23+1	0	5+1	0	0	0
17	MF	(Russia) RUS	Andrei Mostovoy	37	8	23+6	8	1+6	0	0+1	0
19	MF	(Russia) RUS	Aleksei Sutormin	20	0	5+9	0	3+2	0	1	0
21	MF	(Russia) RUS	Aleksandr Yerokhin	28	2	1+19	2	4+3	0	0+1	0
23	DF	(Russia) RUS	Arsen Adamov	14	0	1+8	0	2+3	0	0	0
28	DF	(Kazakhstan) KAZ	Nuraly Alip	13	0	6+2	0	3+1	0	1	0
30	FW	(Colombia) COL	Mateo Cassierra	34	6	17+9	2	5+2	3	0+1	1
31	MF	(Brazil) BRA	Gustavo Mantuan	29	6	4+18	6	5+2	0	0	0
33	FW	(Russia) RUS	Ivan Sergeyev	34	14	14+12	10	3+4	3	1	1
41	GK	(Russia) RUS	Mikhail Kerzhakov	28	0	23+1	0	4	0	0	0
55	DF	(Brazil) BRA	Rodrigão	26	1	21+1	1	3+1	0	0	0
71	GK	(Russia) RUS	Daniil Odoyevsky	5	0	4	0	0	0	1	0
77	DF	(Brazil) BRA	Robert Renan	10	0	9	0	1	0	0	0
94	MF	(Russia) RUS	Danila Kozlov	3	0	0+2	0	0+1	0	0	0
Players away from the club on loan:
35	MF	(Russia) RUS	Vladislav Saus	1	0	0+1	0	0	0	0	0
61	MF	(Russia) RUS	Aleksey Baranovsky	3	0	0+3	0	0	0	0	0
98	MF	(Russia) RUS	Yaroslav Mikhaylov	1	0	0+1	0	0	0	0	0
Players who left Zenit during the season:
1	GK	(Brazil) BRA	Ivan	4	0	0	0	4	0	0	0
6	DF	(Croatia) CRO	Dejan Lovren	16	1	15	1	1	0	0	0
45	MF	(Russia) RUS	Dmitry Sergeyev	1	0	0	0	0+1	0	0	0

=== Goal scorers ===
Place	Position	Nation	Number	Name	Premier League	Russian Cup	Super Cup	Total
1	FW	(Brazil)	10	Malcom	23	2	1	26
2	FW	(Russia)	33	Ivan Sergeyev	10	3	1	14
3	MF	(Brazil)	8	Wendel	8	0	1	9
4	MF	(Russia)	17	Andrei Mostovoy	8	0	0	8
5	MF	(Brazil)	31	Gustavo Mantuan	6	0	0	6
5	FW	(Colombia)	30	Mateo Cassierra	2	3	1	6
7	MF	(Brazil)	11	Claudinho	5	0	0	5
7	MF	(Russia)	14	Daler Kuzyayev	5	0	0	5
9	MF	(Russia)	7	Zelimkhan Bakayev	1	2	0	3
10	MF	(Russia)	21	Aleksandr Yerokhin	2	0	0	2
11	DF	(Brazil)	55	Rodrigão	1	0	0	1
11	DF	(Croatia)	6	Dejan Lovren	1	0	0	1
11	MF	(Colombia)	5	Wilmar Barrios	1	0	0	1
11				Own goal	1	0	0	1
				TOTALS	74	10	4	88

=== Clean sheets ===
Place	Position	Nation	Number	Name	Premier League	Russian Cup	Super Cup	Total
1	GK	(Russia)	41	Mikhail Kerzhakov	12	2	0	14
2	GK	(Russia)	1	Aleksandr Vasyutin	1	2	0	3
3	GK	(Russia)	71	Daniil Odoyevsky	3	0	1	4
				TOTALS	16	4	1	21

=== Disciplinary record ===
Number	Nation	Position	Name	Premier League		Russian Cup		Super Cup		Total	
Number	Nation	Position	Name	Yellow card	Red card	Yellow card	Red card	Yellow card	Red card	Yellow card	Red card
2	(Russia)	DF	Dmitri Chistyakov	2	0	0	0	0	0	2	0
3	(Brazil)	DF	Douglas Santos	2	0	0	0	0	0	2	0
4	(Russia)	DF	Danil Krugovoy	1	0	0	0	0	0	1	0
5	(Colombia)	MF	Wilmar Barrios	3	0	1	1	1	0	5	1
7	(Russia)	MF	Zelimkhan Bakayev	0	0	2	0	0	0	1	0
8	(Brazil)	MF	Wendel	3	0	1	0	0	0	4	0
10	(Brazil)	FW	Malcom	1	0	1	1	0	0	2	1
11	(Brazil)	MF	Claudinho	3	0	1	1	0	0	4	0
14	(Russia)	MF	Daler Kuzyayev	3	0	3	0	0	0	6	0
15	(Russia)	DF	Vyacheslav Karavayev	1	0	0	0	0	0	1	0
19	(Russia)	MF	Aleksei Sutormin	2	0	0	0	0	0	2	0
21	(Russia)	MF	Aleksandr Yerokhin	0	0	2	0	0	0	1	0
23	(Russia)	DF	Arsen Adamov	0	0	1	0	0	0	1	0
28	(Kazakhstan)	DF	Nuraly Alip	1	0	1	0	0	0	2	0
31	(Brazil)	MF	Gustavo Mantuan	2	0	0	0	0	0	2	0
41	(Russia)	GK	Mikhail Kerzhakov	2	0	0	0	0	0	2	0
55	(Brazil)	DF	Rodrigão	3	0	2	1	0	0	5	1
71	(Russia)	GK	Daniil Odoyevsky	0	1	0	0	0	0	0	1
Players away on loan:
Players who left Zenit during the season:
6	(Croatia)	DF	Dejan Lovren	1	0	1	0	0	0	2	0
			TOTALS	0	0	0	0	1	0	0	0
