= Rodrigão (footballer, born 1995) =

Brazilian footballer

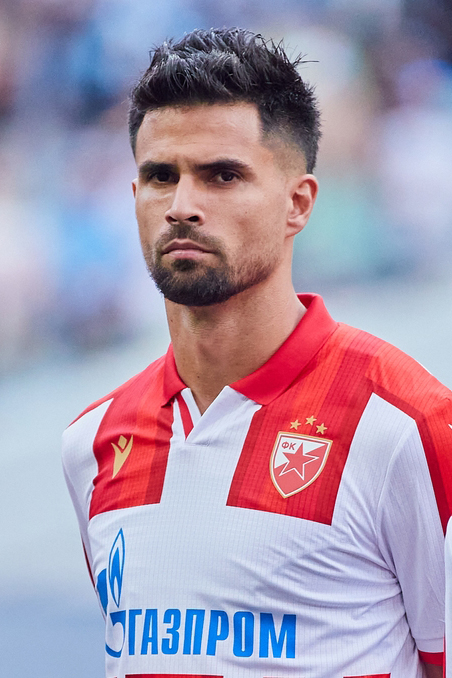
- Rodrigão with Red Star Belgrade in 2025

Personal information
- Full name: Rodrigo de Souza Prado
- Date of birth: 11 September 1995 (age 31)
- Place of birth: Brasília, Brazil
- Height: 1.91 m (6 ft 3 in)
- Position: Centre-back

Team information
- Current team: Red Star Belgrade
- Number: 5

Youth career
- 2009–2015: Atlético Mineiro

Senior career*
Years	Team	Apps	(Gls)
2016–2019	Atlético Mineiro	3	(0)
2016	→ Caldense (loan)	1	(0)
2016	→ Coimbra (loan)	9	(1)
2018	→ Boa Esporte (loan)	13	(0)
2019	→ Ferroviária (loan)	9	(0)
2019–2021	Gil Vicente	47	(3)
2021–2022	Sochi	26	(2)
2022–2024	Zenit Saint Petersburg	40	(2)
2025–2026	Red Star Belgrade	24	(3)
- * Club domestic league appearances and goals as of 30 August 2026

Rodrigo de Souza Prado (born 11 September 1995), simply known as Rodrigão, is a Brazilian footballer who plays as a centre-back for Serbian SuperLiga club Red Star Belgrade.

== Club career ==
A graduate of the Atlético Mineiro club, he signed his first professional contract with the same club. Early in his adult career, he played on loan for the clubs Caldense, Coimbra, Boa Esporte, and Ferroviária in the lower leagues of Brazil and at the state championship level. In 2017, he played 3 incomplete matches for the main squad of Atlético Mineiro in Campeonato Brasileiro Série A. He played his debut match in the top division on August 8, 2017, against Avaí.

In the summer of 2019, he moved to the Primeira Liga club in Portugal, Gil Vicente, where he spent two seasons, playing 47 matches and scoring 3 goals in the league, as well as participating in 6 cup matches.

On 1 July 2021, he signed with Russian Premier League club PFC Sochi. He scored a goal in his debut official match for the club on July 22, 2021, in the UEFA Europa Conference League against the club Shamakhi, This goal also became the first in the club's history in European competitions.

On 7 July 2022, Rodrigão signed with Russian champions Zenit Saint Petersburg on a three-year contract with an option to extend. On 28 February 2025, Zenit announced that they reached an agreement for the early termination of Rodrigão's contract.

== Career statistics ==
As of match played 30 August 2026

Appearances and goals by club, season and competition
Club	Season	League			State League		Cup		Continental		Other		Total	
Club	Season	Division	Apps	Goals	Apps	Goals	Apps	Goals	Apps	Goals	Apps	Goals	Apps	Goals
Caldense	2016	Série D	1	0	0	0	—		—		—		1	0
Atlético Mineiro	2017	Série A	3	0	—		0	0	—		—		3	0
Boa Esporte	2018	Série B	13	0	—		—		—		—		13	0
Ferroviária	2019	Série D	—		9	0	—		—		—		9	0
Gil Vicente	2019–20	Primeira Liga	17	2	—		0	0	—		2 (Note: Appearances in Taça da Liga)	0	19	2
Gil Vicente	2020–21	Primeira Liga	30	1	—		4	0	—		—		34	1
Gil Vicente	Total		47	3	0	0	4	0	0	0	2	0	53	3
Sochi	2021–22	Russian Premier League	26	2	—		1	0	4 (Note: Appearances in the UEFA Europa Conference League)	1	—		31	3
Zenit St. Petersburg	2022–23	Russian Premier League	22	1	—		4	0	—		—		26	1
Zenit St. Petersburg	2023–24	Russian Premier League	16	1	—		7	0	—		—		23	1
Zenit St. Petersburg	2024–25	Russian Premier League	2	0	—		4	0	—		1 (Note: Appearance in Russian Premier League)	1	7	1
Zenit St. Petersburg	Total		40	2	—		15	0	—		1	1	56	3
Red Star Belgrade	2025–26	Serbian SuperLiga	22	3	—		3	1	11 (Note: Four appearances in UEFA Champions League, seven appearances in UEFA Europa League)	0	—		36	4
Red Star Belgrade	2026–27	Serbian SuperLiga	2	0	—		0	0	1 (Note: One appearance in UEFA Europa League)	0	—		3	0
Red Star Belgrade	Total		24	3	—		3	1	12	0	—		39	4
Career total			154	9	0	0	23	1	16	1	3	1	196	12

== Honours ==
Zenit St. Petersburg

- Russian Premier League: 2022–23, 2023–24
- Russian Cup: 2023–24
- Russian Super Cup: 2022, 2024

Red Star

- Serbian SuperLiga: 2025–26
- Serbian Cup: 2025–26

=== Individual ===
- Russian Premier League Centre-back of the Season: 2021–22
