= Arsen Adamov =

Russian footballer (born 1999)

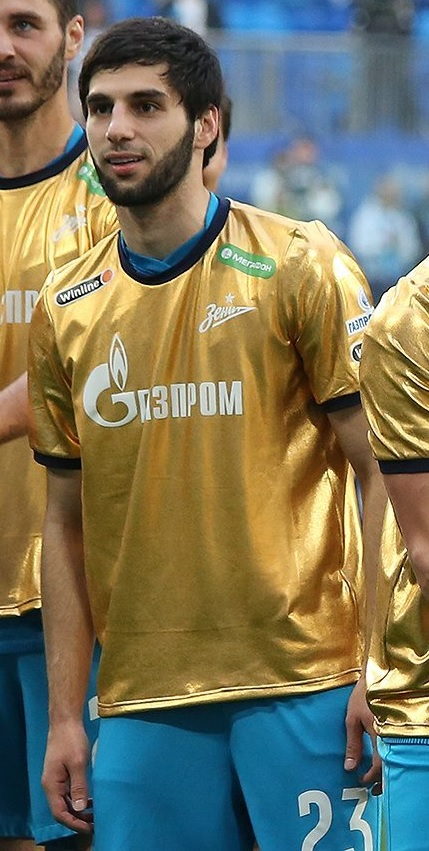
- Adamov with Zenit St. Petersburg in 2022

Personal information
- Full name: Arsen Ruslanovich Adamov
- Date of birth: 20 October 1999 (age 27)
- Place of birth: Nizhny Tagil, Russia
- Height: 1.80 m (5 ft 11 in)
- Position: Right-back

Team information
- Current team: Akhmat Grozny
- Number: 95

Youth career
- Kislovodsk Sport School
- 2010–2020: Akhmat Grozny

Senior career*
Years	Team	Apps	(Gls)
2017–2020	Akhmat Grozny	4	(0)
2021–2022	Ural Yekaterinburg	25	(1)
2022–2026	Zenit Saint Petersburg	17	(0)
2023–2024	→ Orenburg (loan)	24	(1)
2024–2025	→ Akhmat Grozny (loan)	30	(1)
2026–	Akhmat Grozny	15	(0)

International career^{‡}
2020–2021	Russia U20	4	(0)
2023–	Russia	8	(2)
- * Club domestic league appearances and goals as of 21 November 2026 ‡ National team caps and goals as of 3 October 2026

Arsen Ruslanovich Adamov (Russian: Арсен Русланович Адамов; born 20 October 1999) is a Russian professional footballer who plays as a right-back for Akhmat Grozny and the Russia national team. He is of Chechen descent.

== Club career ==
Adamov was first included in the senior team of Akhmat Grozny in July 2017 for a game against Dynamo Moscow and remained on the bench in that game.

He made his debut in the Russian Premier League for Akhmat Grozny three years later, on 22 July 2020 in a game against Krasnodar, as a starter.

On 15 January 2021, Adamov signed with Ural Yekaterinburg.

On 25 January 2022, Zenit St.Petersburg announced the signing of Adamov from Ural Yekaterinburg on a contract until the end of 2025–26 season.

On 1 August 2023, Adamov joined Orenburg on loan until the end of the 2023–24 season.

On 20 June 2024, Adamov returned on loan to Akhmat Grozny for the 2024–25 season.

In May 2026, Adamov's contract with Zenit St.Petersburg expired, and it was not renewed.

On 9 June 2026, Adamov returned to Akhmat Grozny and signed a three-year contract.

== International career ==
He was called up to the Russia national football team for the first time for World Cup qualifiers against Slovakia and Slovenia in October 2021. He made his debut on 16 October 2023 in a friendly against Kenya.

== Personal life ==
Adamov is a grandson of Chechen football coach and politician Khaydar Alkhanov.

== Career statistics ==
=== Club ===
As of match played 21 November 2026

Appearances and goals by club, season and competition
Club	Season	League			Cup		Europe		Other		Total	
Club	Season	Division	Apps	Goals	Apps	Goals	Apps	Goals	Apps	Goals	Apps	Goals
Akhmat Grozny	2017–18	Russian Premier League	0	0	0	0	—		—		0	0
Akhmat Grozny	2019–20	Russian Premier League	1	0	0	0	—		—		1	0
Akhmat Grozny	2020–21	Russian Premier League	3	0	2	0	—		—		5	0
Akhmat Grozny	Total		4	0	2	0	0	0	—		6	0
Ural Yekaterinburg	2020–21	Russian Premier League	8	0	1	0	—		—		9	0
Ural Yekaterinburg	2021–22	Russian Premier League	17	1	2	0	—		—		19	1
Ural Yekaterinburg	Total		25	1	3	0	0	0	—		28	1
Zenit St. Petersburg	2021–22	Russian Premier League	4	0	2	0	0	0	—		6	0
Zenit St. Petersburg	2022–23	Russian Premier League	9	0	5	0	—		—		14	0
Zenit St. Petersburg	2023–24	Russian Premier League	1	0	0	0	—		0	0	1	0
Zenit St. Petersburg	2025–26	Russian Premier League	3	0	6	1	—		—		9	1
Zenit St. Petersburg	Total		17	0	13	1	0	0	0	0	30	1
Orenburg (loan)	2023–24	Russian Premier League	24	1	1	0	—		—		25	1
Akhmat Grozny (loan)	2024–25	Russian Premier League	30	1	4	0	—		2 (Note: Appearances in the relegation play-offs)	0	36	1
Akhmat Grozny	2026–27	Russian Premier League	15	0	1	0	—		—		16	0
Akhmat Grozny	Club total		49	1	7	0	0	0	2	0	58	1
Career total			115	3	24	1	0	0	2	0	141	4

=== International ===
As of match played 3 October 2026

Appearances and goals by national team and year
National team	Year	Apps	Goals
Russia	2023	1	0
Russia	2024	3	1
Russia	2025	3	1
Russia	2026	1	0
Total		8	2

=== International goals ===
No.	Date	Venue	Opponent	Score	Result	Competition
1.	15 November 2024	Krasnodar Stadium, Krasnodar, Russia	Brunei	11–0	11–0	Friendly
2.	19 March 2025	VTB Arena, Moscow, Russia	Grenada	2–0	5–0	Friendly

== Honours ==
=== Club ===
Zenit Saint Petersburg

- Russian Premier League: 2021–22, 2022–23, 2025–26
- Russian Super Cup: 2022, 2023
