= Aleksandr Vasyutin =

Russian footballer (born 1995)

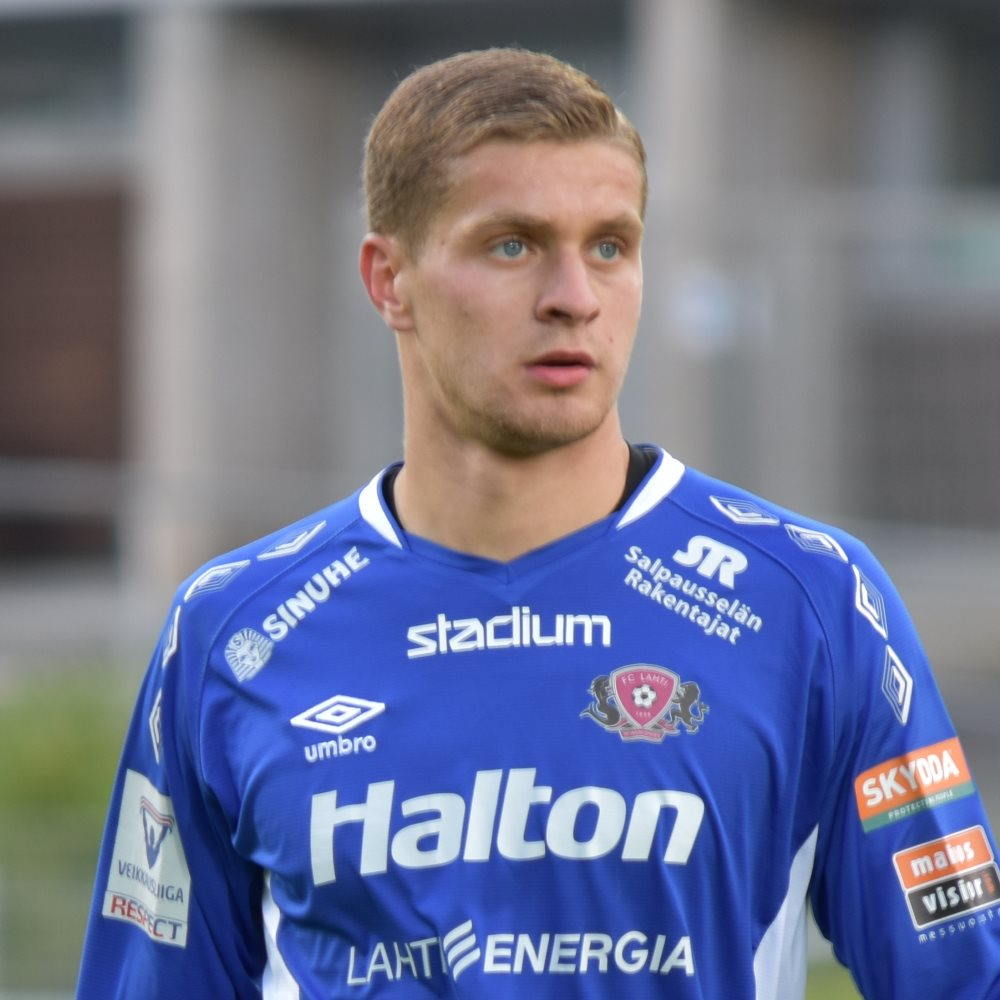
- Vasyutin with FC Lahti in 2017

Personal information
- Full name: Aleksandr Yuryevich Vasyutin
- Date of birth: 4 March 1995 (age 31)
- Place of birth: Saint Petersburg, Russia
- Height: 1.88 m (6 ft 2 in)
- Position: Goalkeeper

Youth career
- Zenit Saint Petersburg

Senior career*
Years	Team	Apps	(Gls)
2012–2018	Zenit Saint Petersburg	0	(0)
2016–2018	→ Lahti (loan)	44	(1)
2018–2019	Sarpsborg 08	25	(0)
2019–2024	Zenit Saint Petersburg	6	(0)
2021–2022	→ Djurgården (loan)	12	(0)
2024–2026	Akron Tolyatti	17	(0)
- * Club domestic league appearances and goals as of 17 May 2026

Aleksandr Yuryevich Vasyutin (Russian: Александр Юрьевич Васютин; born 4 March 1995) is a Russian football player who plays as a goalkeeper.

== Club career ==
In Vasyutin's first game for Lahti on 13 August 2016 against PK-35 Vantaa, he scored a last-minute equalizer for his team. He won FC Lahti's player of the year, FC Lahti fans' player of the year and Finnish league goalkeeper of the year awards in 2017.

Vasyutin rejoined Lahti on a new loan in April 2018.

On 5 July 2018 he joined Norwegian club Sarpsborg 08, signing a 2.5-year contract.

On 23 July 2019, Vasyutin returned to Zenit, signing a four-year contract. He made his first competitive appearance for Zenit's senior squad on 30 October 2019 in a Russian Cup game against Tom Tomsk. He made his Russian Premier League debut for Zenit on 15 July 2020, when he started the game against Orenburg.

On 11 February 2021, he joined Swedish club Djurgårdens IF on loan. The club had an option to make the transfer permanent after the loan period. On 10 January 2022, the loan was extended until the end of 2022.

On 3 June 2024, Vasyutin left Zenit as his contract expired.

On 21 June 2024, Vasyutin joined the Russian Premier League newcomer Akron Tolyatti. He left Akron as his contract expired in June 2026.

== Career statistics ==
As of match played 17 May 2026

Appearances and goals by club, season and competition
Club	Season	League			National cup (Note: Includes Finnish Cup, Russian Cup, Svenska Cupen)		Continental		Other		Total	
Club	Season	Division	Apps	Goals	Apps	Goals	Apps	Goals	Apps	Goals	Apps	Goals
Zenit Saint Petersburg	2013–14	Russian Premier League	0	0	0	0	—		—		0	0
Zenit Saint Petersburg	2014–15	Russian Premier League	0	0	0	0	—		—		0	0
Zenit Saint Petersburg	2015–16	Russian Premier League	0	0	0	0	—		—		0	0
Zenit Saint Petersburg	2016–17	Russian Premier League	0	0	0	0	—		—		0	0
Zenit Saint Petersburg	Total		0	0	0	0	—		—		0	0
Lahti (loan)	2016	Veikkausliiga	12	1	0	0	—		—		12	1
Lahti (loan)	2017	Veikkausliiga	23	0	1	0	—		—		24	0
Lahti (loan)	2018	Veikkausliiga	9	0	0	0	0	0	—		9	0
Lahti (loan)	Total		44	1	1	0	—		—		45	1
Sarpsborg 08	2018	Eliteserien	12	0	0	0	—		—		12	0
Sarpsborg 08	2019	Eliteserien	13	0	0	0	11 (Note: Appearances in UEFA Europa League)	0	—		24	0
Sarpsborg 08	Total		25	0	0	0	11	0	—		36	0
Zenit Saint Petersburg	2019–20	Russian Premier League	2	0	1	0	0	0	—		3	0
Zenit Saint Petersburg	2020–21	Russian Premier League	0	0	0	0	0	0	—		0	0
Zenit Saint Petersburg	2022–23	Russian Premier League	3	0	1	0	—		—		4	0
Zenit Saint Petersburg	2023–24	Russian Premier League	1	0	4	0	—		0	0	5	0
Zenit Saint Petersburg	Total		6	0	6	0	—		0	0	12	0
Djurgården (loan)	2021	Allsvenskan	10	0	4	0	—		—		14	0
Djurgården (loan)	2022	Allsvenskan	2	0	0	0	3 (Note: Appearances in UEFA Europa Conference League)	0	—		5	0
Djurgården (loan)	Total		12	0	4	0	3	0	—		19	0
Akron Tolyatti	2024–25	Russian Premier League	15	0	3	0	—		—		18	0
Akron Tolyatti	2025–26	Russian Premier League	2	0	3	0	—		—		5	0
Akron Tolyatti	Total		17	0	6	0	0	0	0	0	23	0
Career total			104	1	17	0	14	0	0	0	135	1

== Honours ==
Zenit Saint Petersburg

- Russian Premier League: 2019–20, 2022–23, 2023–24
- Russian Cup: 2019–20, 2023–24

=== Individual ===
- Veikkausliiga Goalkeeper of the Year: 2017
- Veikkausliiga Team of the Year: 2017
