= Aleksei Sutormin =

Russian footballer (born 1994)

Aleksei Sutormin Алексей Сутормин
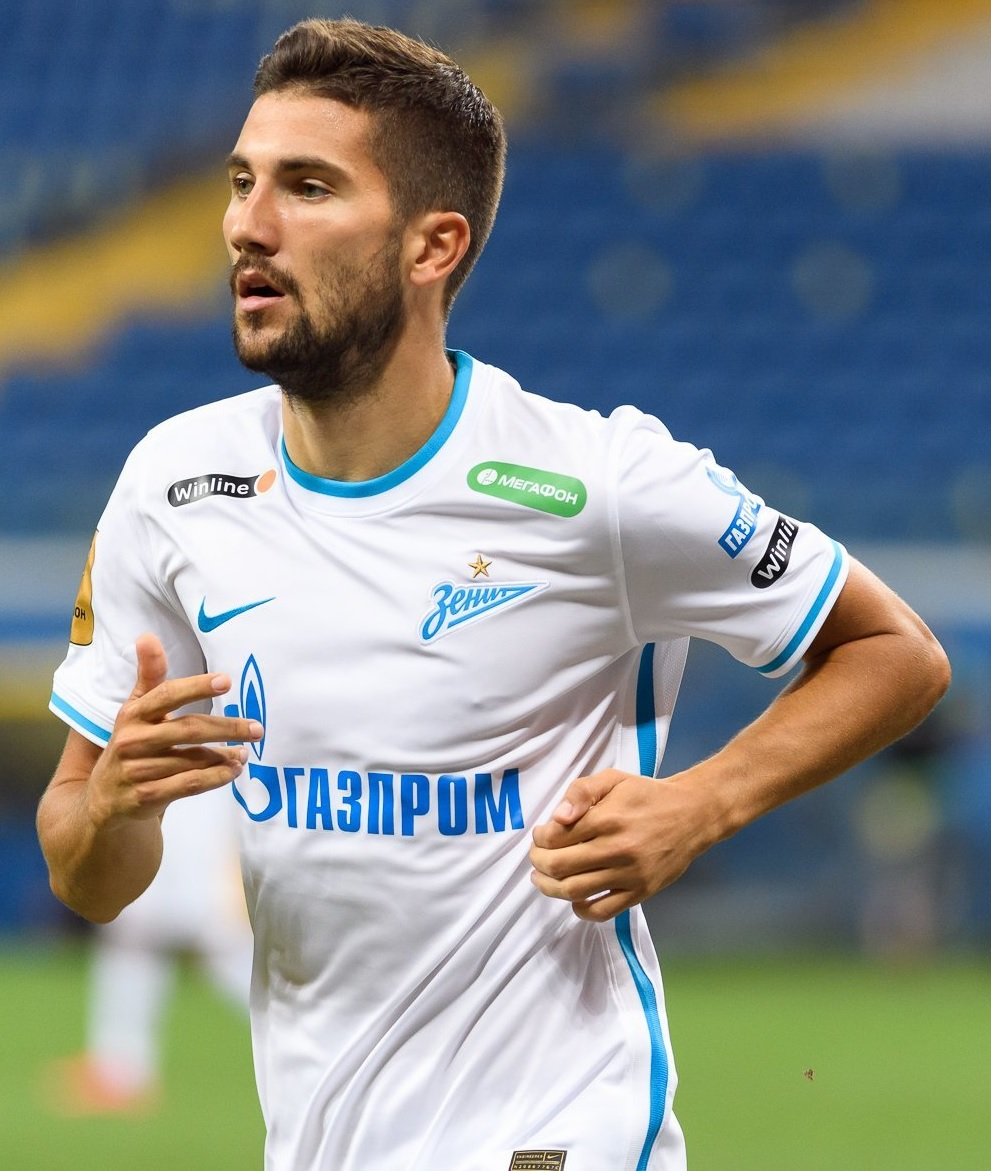
- Sutormin with Zenit Saint Petersburg in 2021

Personal information
- Full name: Aleksei Sergeyevich Sutormin
- Date of birth: 10 January 1994 (age 32)
- Place of birth: Moscow, Russia
- Height: 1.88 m (6 ft 2 in)
- Positions: Winger; right-back

Team information
- Current team: Fakel Voronezh
- Number: 11

Youth career
- Strogino Moscow
- 2007–2010: Khimki
- 2010–2012: Zenit Saint Petersburg

Senior career*
Years	Team	Apps	(Gls)
2013–2015	Strogino Moscow	56	(15)
2015–2017	Volgar Astrakhan	92	(22)
2018–2019	Orenburg	42	(11)
2019	Rubin Kazan	0	(0)
2019–2025	Zenit St. Petersburg	96	(10)
2024	→ Sochi (loan)	10	(2)
2024–2025	→ Rostov (loan)	24	(0)
2025–2026	Krylia Sovetov Samara	16	(0)
2026–	Fakel Voronezh	10	(1)

International career^{‡}
2015–2016	Russia U21	7	(1)
2021	Russia	3	(1)
- * Club domestic league appearances and goals as of 21 November 2026 ‡ National team caps and goals as of 11 November 2021

Aleksei Sergeyevich Sutormin (Russian: Алексей Серге́евич Сутормин; born 10 January 1994) is a Russian professional footballer who plays as a midfielder for Fakel Voronezh. He has also been successfully used as a right-back.

== Club career ==
He made his debut in the Russian Second Division for Strogino Moscow on 15 July 2013 in a game against Torpedo Vladimir.

On 29 June 2019, he signed a 4-year contract with Rubin Kazan. Just 9 days later on 8 July 2019, after playing in 2 friendlies for Rubin, he moved again, signing a 3-year contract with 1-year extension option with Russian champion Zenit St. Petersburg. On 21 September 2019, he scored a brace against his former club Rubin Kazan in the Russian Premier League.

On 7 April 2022, Sutormin signed a new contract with Zenit through the 2024–25 season.

On 11 February 2024, Sutormin moved on loan to Sochi. On 15 August 2024, he was loaned to Rostov.

On 8 July 2025, Sutormin joined Krylia Sovetov Samara on a one-seadon deal. He left Krylia Sovetov as his contract expired in June 2026.

On 16 July 2026, Sutormin signed a one-year contract with Fakel Voronezh.

== International career ==
He was called up to the Russia national football team for the first time for World Cup qualifiers against Croatia, Cyprus and Malta in September 2021. He made his debut on 8 October 2021 against Slovakia. In his second game three days later against Slovenia, he was chosen as team captain. In his next game against Cyprus on 11 November 2021, he scored his first goal for the national team.

== Honours ==
Zenit Saint Petersburg

- Russian Premier League: 2019–20, 2020–21, 2021–22, 2022–23,
- Russian Cup: 2019–20
- Russian Super Cup: 2021, 2022, 2023

== Career statistics ==
=== Club ===
As of match played 21 November 2026

Appearances and goals by club, season and competition
Club	Season	League			Cup		Continental		Other		Total	
Club	Season	Division	Apps	Goals	Apps	Goals	Apps	Goals	Apps	Goals	Apps	Goals
Strogino Moscow	2013–14	Russian Second League	31	6	3	2	–		–		34	8
Strogino Moscow	2014–15	Russian Second League	25	9	1	0	–		–		26	9
Strogino Moscow	Total		56	15	4	2	0	0	0	0	60	17
Volgar-2 Astrakhan	2015–16	Russian Amateur Football League	–		–		–		1 (Note: Appearance(s) in the FNL Cup)	1	1	1
Volgar Astrakhan	2015–16	Russian First League	33	4	1	0	–		5 (Note: Three appearances, one goal in the FNL Cup, two appearances in the promotion play-offs)	1	39	5
Volgar Astrakhan	2016–17	Russian First League	38	9	1	0	–		4	3	43	12
Volgar Astrakhan	2017–18	Russian First League	23	9	0	0	–		–		23	9
Volgar Astrakhan	Total		94	22	2	0	0	0	9	4	105	26
Orenburg	2017–18	Russian First League	13	3	–		–		–		13	3
Orenburg	2018–19	Russian Premier League	29	8	2	1	–		–		31	9
Orenburg	Total		42	11	2	1	0	0	0	0	44	12
Zenit St. Petersburg	2019–20	Russian Premier League	24	3	5	2	2	0	–		31	5
Zenit St. Petersburg	2020–21	Russian Premier League	26	3	1	0	5	0	–		32	3
Zenit St. Petersburg	2021–22	Russian Premier League	25	4	2	0	5	1	–		32	5
Zenit St. Petersburg	2022–23	Russian Premier League	14	0	4	0	–		1 (Note: Appearance in the Russian Super Cup)	0	19	0
Zenit St. Petersburg	2023–24	Russian Premier League	7	0	4	0	–		1	0	12	0
Zenit St. Petersburg	Total		96	10	16	2	12	1	2	0	126	13
Sochi (loan)	2023–24	Russian Premier League	10	2	0	0	–		–		10	2
Rostov (loan)	2024–25	Russian Premier League	24	0	9	2	–		–		33	2
Krylia Sovetov Samara	2025–26	Russian Premier League	16	0	6	0	–		–		22	0
Fakel Voronezh	2026–27	Russian Premier League	10	1	3	0	–		–		13	1
Career total			348	61	42	7	12	1	12	5	414	74

=== International ===
As of match played 11 November 2021

Appearances and goals by national team and year
National team	Year	Apps	Goals
Russia	2021	3	1
Total		3	1

Scores and results list Russia's goal tally first.

No.	Date	Venue	Opponent	Score	Result	Competition
1.	11 November 2021	Krestovsky Stadium, Saint Petersburg, Russia	Cyprus	4–0	6–0	2022 FIFA World Cup qualification
