= Dmitri Chistyakov =

Russian footballer (born 1994)

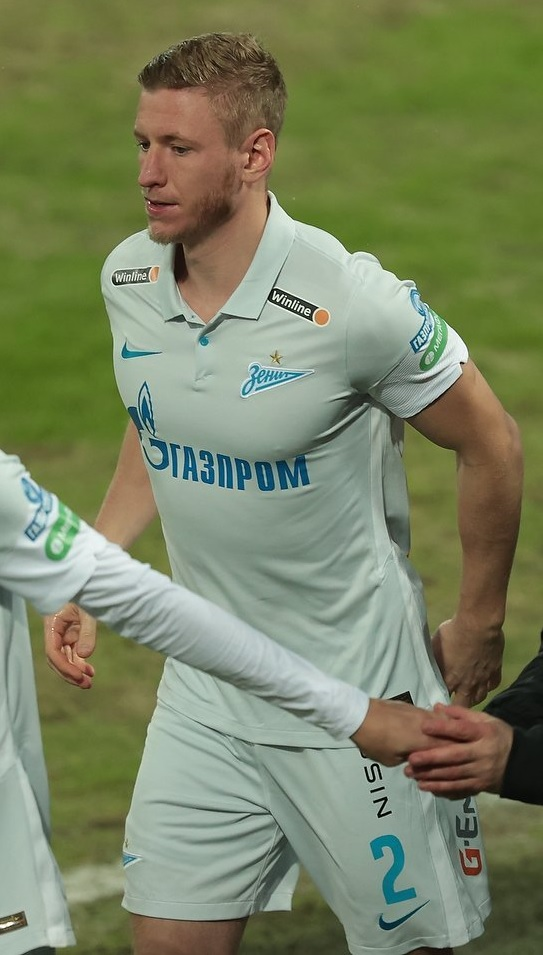
- Chistyakov with Zenit in 2021

Personal information
- Full name: Dmitri Yuryevich Chistyakov
- Date of birth: 13 January 1994 (age 32)
- Place of birth: Pikalyovo, Russia
- Height: 1.85 m (6 ft 1 in)
- Position: Centre-back

Team information
- Current team: Rostov
- Number: 78

Youth career
- 2000–2007: Metallurg Pikalyovo
- 2007–2012: Zenit St. Petersburg

Senior career*
| Years | Team | Apps | (Gls) |
| 2012–2016 | Zenit St. Petersburg | 0 | (0) |
| 2012 | → Rostov (loan) | 0 | (0) |
| 2013–2015 | → Zenit-2 St. Petersburg | 44 | (0) |
| 2015–2016 | → Mika (loan) | 17 | (0) |
| 2016–2018 | Shinnik Yaroslavl | 65 | (5) |
| 2018–2019 | Tambov | 26 | (3) |
| 2019–2021 | Rostov | 24 | (1) |
| 2020–2021 | → Zenit St. Petersburg (loan) | 14 | (0) |
| 2021–2025 | Zenit St. Petersburg | 48 | (1) |
| 2024 | → Sochi (loan) | 6 | (0) |
| 2025– | Rostov | 24 | (0) |

International career
| 2012 | Russia U-18 | 1 | (1) |
| 2013 | Russia U-19 | 3 | (0) |
| 2019–2021 | Russia | 4 | (0) |
- * Club domestic league appearances and goals as of 20 November 2026

Dmitri Yuryevich Chistyakov (Russian: Дми́трий Ю́рьевич Чистяко́в; born 13 January 1994) is a Russian professional footballer who plays as a centre-back for Russian Premier League club Rostov.

== Club career ==
He made his professional debut in the Russian Professional Football League for FC Zenit-2 St. Petersburg on 15 July 2013 in a game against FC Tosno.

On 7 June 2019, he left Zenit and signed a 4-year contract with FC Rostov. He made his debut in the Russian Premier League for Rostov on 13 July 2019 in a game against FC Orenburg.

On 15 October 2020, he returned to Zenit St. Petersburg on loan. On 3 June 2021, he moved to Zenit on a permanent basis and subsequently signed a 4-year contract with the club.

On 14 January 2024, Chistyakov moved to fellow Russian side Sochi on loan until the end of the season.

On 22 June 2025, Chistyakov returned to Rostov, having been away from the club since 2019.

== International career ==
He was called up to the Russia national football team for the first time for UEFA Euro 2020 qualifying matches against Scotland and Cyprus, on 10 and 13 October 2019.

On 11 May 2021, Chistyakov was named as a standby player in Russia's 26-man squad for the UEFA Euro 2020. He was later cut from the final list.

He made his debut for Russia on 8 October 2021, in a World Cup qualifier against Slovakia.

== Career statistics ==
=== Club ===
As of match played 20 November 2026

Appearances and goals by club, season and competition
| Club | Season | League | | | Cup | | Europe | | Other | | Total | |
| Club | Season | Division | Apps | Goals | Apps | Goals | Apps | Goals | Apps | Goals | Apps | Goals |
|---|---|---|---|---|---|---|---|---|---|---|---|---|
| Zenit-2 St. Petersburg | 2013–14 | Russian Second League | 28 | 0 | — | | — | | — | | 28 | 0 |
| Zenit-2 St. Petersburg | 2014–15 | Russian Second League | 15 | 0 | — | | — | | — | | 15 | 0 |
| Zenit-2 St. Petersburg | 2015–16 | Russian First League | 1 | 0 | — | | — | | — | | 1 | 0 |
| Zenit-2 St. Petersburg | Total | | 44 | 0 | 0 | 0 | 0 | 0 | 0 | 0 | 44 | 0 |
| Mika (loan) | 2015–16 | Armenian Premier League | 17 | 0 | 5 | 0 | — | | — | | 22 | 0 |
| Shinnik Yaroslavl | 2016–17 | Russian First League | 30 | 2 | 2 | 0 | — | | 5 (Note: Appearances in the FNL Cup) | 0 | 37 | 2 |
| Shinnik Yaroslavl | 2017–18 | Russian First League | 35 | 3 | 2 | 1 | — | | — | | 37 | 4 |
| Shinnik Yaroslavl | Total | | 65 | 5 | 4 | 1 | 0 | 0 | 5 | 0 | 74 | 6 |
| Tambov | 2018–19 | Russian First League | 26 | 3 | 1 | 0 | — | | 3 | 0 | 30 | 3 |
| Rostov | 2019–20 | Russian Premier League | 22 | 1 | 1 | 0 | — | | — | | 23 | 1 |
| Rostov | 2020–21 | Russian Premier League | 2 | 0 | — | | 0 | 0 | — | | 2 | 0 |
| Rostov | Total | | 24 | 1 | 1 | 0 | 0 | 0 | 0 | 0 | 25 | 1 |
| Zenit St. Petersburg (loan) | 2020–21 | Russian Premier League | 14 | 0 | 0 | 0 | 0 | 0 | — | | 14 | 0 |
| Zenit St. Petersburg | 2021–22 | Russian Premier League | 27 | 1 | 2 | 0 | 7 (Note: Five appearance in UEFA Champions League, two appearances in UEFA Europa League) | 0 | 1 (Note: Appearance in the Russian Super Cup) | 0 | 37 | 1 |
| Zenit St. Petersburg | 2022–23 | Russian Premier League | 15 | 0 | 6 | 0 | — | | 1 | 0 | 22 | 0 |
| Zenit St. Petersburg | 2023–24 | Russian Premier League | 6 | 0 | 2 | 0 | — | | 1 | 0 | 9 | 0 |
| Zenit St. Petersburg | 2024–25 | Russian Premier League | 0 | 0 | 8 | 1 | — | | — | | 8 | 1 |
| Zenit St. Petersburg | Total | | 48 | 1 | 18 | 1 | 7 | 0 | 3 | 0 | 76 | 2 |
| Sochi (loan) | 2023–24 | Russian Premier League | 6 | 0 | 1 | 0 | — | | — | | 7 | 0 |
| Rostov | 2025–26 | Russian Premier League | 22 | 0 | 6 | 1 | — | | — | | 28 | 1 |
| Rostov | 2026–27 | Russian Premier League | 2 | 0 | 2 | 0 | — | | — | | 4 | 0 |
| Rostov | Total | | 24 | 0 | 8 | 1 | 0 | 0 | 0 | 0 | 32 | 1 |
| Career total | | | 268 | 10 | 38 | 3 | 7 | 0 | 11 | 0 | 324 | 13 |

== Honours ==
Zenit Saint Petersburg

- Russian Premier League: 2020–21, 2021–22, 2022–23, 2023–24
- Russian Cup: 2023–24
- Russian Super Cup: 2021, 2022, 2023, 2024
