= Robert Renan =

Brazilian footballer (born 2003)

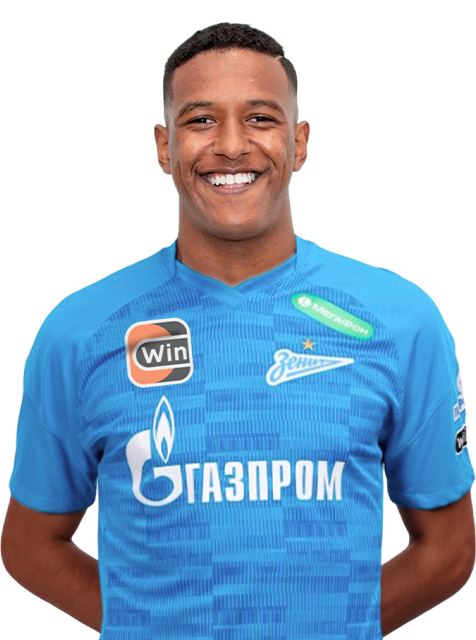
- Renan with Zenit Saint Petersburg in 2023

Personal information
- Full name: Robert Renan Alves Barbosa
- Date of birth: 11 October 2003 (age 23)
- Place of birth: Ceilândia, Federal District, Brazil
- Height: 1.86 m (6 ft 1 in)
- Position: Centre-back

Team information
- Current team: Vasco da Gama
- Number: 30

Youth career
- 2018–2019: Novorizontino
- 2019–2022: Corinthians

Senior career*
Years	Team	Apps	(Gls)
2022–2023	Corinthians	10	(0)
2023–	Zenit Saint Petersburg	13	(0)
2024	→ Internacional (loan)	24	(0)
2024–2025	→ Al Shabab (loan)	31	(0)
2025–	→ Vasco da Gama (loan)	33	(1)

International career^{‡}
2021	Brazil U18	3	(0)
2022–2023	Brazil U20	18	(1)
2023–	Brazil U23	1	(0)
Medal record
Men's football
Representing Brazil
South American U-20 Championship
Winner	2023 Colombia
- * Club domestic league appearances and goals as of 8 April 2026 ‡ National team caps and goals as of 7 September 2023

Robert Renan Alves Barbosa (born 11 October 2003) is a Brazilian footballer who plays as a centre-back for Brasileirão club Vasco da Gama on loan from Russian Premier League club Zenit Saint Petersburg.

== Early life ==
Robert Renan was born in Ceilândia, Federal District.

== Club career ==
Robert Renan made his first team debut on 20 April 2022 in 1–1 away draw against Portuguesa da Ilha in Copa do Brasil. He made his Série A debut on 26 June 2022 in a 0–0 home draw against Santos.

In January 2023, Robert Renan signed for Russian Premier League club Zenit Saint Petersburg on a five-year contract. On 4 January 2024, Zenit announced Renan's loan to Internacional until the end of 2024.

On 3 September 2024, Renan was sent on loan to Al Shabab in Saudi Arabia.

On 28 August 2025, Renan was loaned to Vasco da Gama until 30 June 2026. At the end of the loan, it was extended until the end of 2026.

== International career ==
Robert Renan has played internationally for Brazil at under-18 and under-20 levels.

On 3 March 2023, Robert received his first call-up to the senior Brazil national team by the interim manager Ramon Menezes for a friendly against Morocco. He did not play.

== Career statistics ==
=== Club ===
As of match played 31 October 2023

Appearances and goals by club, season and competition
Club	Season	League			National cup		Continental		Other		Total	
Club	Season	Division	Apps	Goals	Apps	Goals	Apps	Goals	Apps	Goals	Apps	Goals
Corinthians	2022	Série A	10	0	3	0	0	0	0	0	13	0
Zenit Saint Petersburg	2022–23	Russian Premier League	9	0	1	0	—		—		10	0
Zenit Saint Petersburg	2023–24	Russian Premier League	4	0	3	0	—		1 (Note: Appearance in Russian Super Cup)	0	8	0
Zenit Saint Petersburg	Total		13	0	4	0	—		1	0	18	0
Internacional (loan)	2024	Série A	0	0	0	0	—		0	0	0	0
Career total			23	0	7	0	0	0	1	0	31	0

== Honours ==
Zenit Saint Petersburg

- Russian Premier League: 2022–23, 2023–24
- Russian Cup: 2023–24
- Russian Super Cup: 2023

Brazil U20

- South American U-20 Championship: 2023
