= Konstantin Lyakhov =

Russian footballer

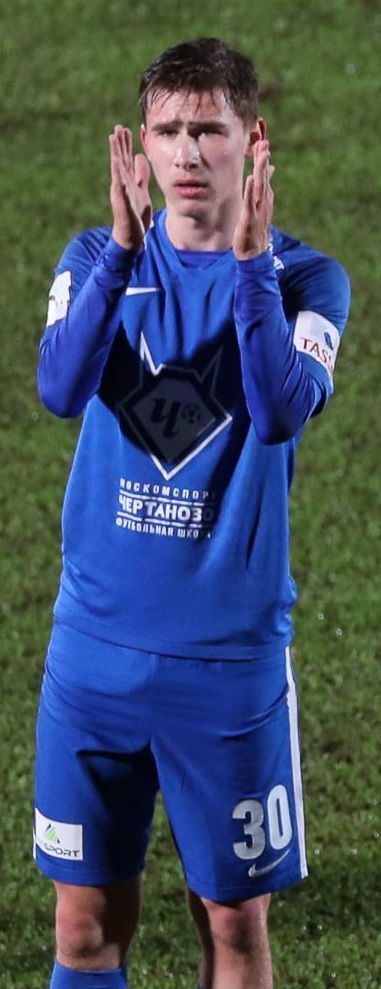
- Lyakhov with Chertanovo in 2021

Personal information
- Full name: Konstantin Yuryevich Lyakhov
- Date of birth: 17 October 2002 (age 24)
- Height: 1.77 m (5 ft 9 1/2 in)
- Position: Defender

Youth career
- Chertanovo Education Center

Senior career*
Years	Team	Apps	(Gls)
2020–2022	Chertanovo Moscow	41	(0)
2023–2024	Chertanovo Moscow	2	(0)
2024–2025	Krylia Sovetov-2 Samara	32	(2)

International career^{‡}
2019	Russia U-18	2	(0)
- * Club domestic league appearances and goals as of 6 July 2025 ‡ National team caps and goals as of 18 November 2019

Konstantin Yuryevich Lyakhov (Russian: Константин Юрьевич Ляхов; born 17 October 2002) is a Russian football player.

== Club career ==
He made his debut in the Russian Football National League for Chertanovo Moscow on 22 August 2020 in a game against Neftekhimik Nizhnekamsk.
