= Aleksey Baranovsky =

Russian footballer (born 2005)

Personal information
- Full name: Aleksey Timofeyevich Baranovsky
- Date of birth: 25 January 2005 (age 21)
- Place of birth: Saint Petersburg, Russia
- Height: 1.84 m (6 ft 0 in)
- Position: Centre-forward

Team information
- Current team: Orenburg
- Number: 94

Youth career
- Zenit Saint Petersburg

Senior career*
Years	Team	Apps	(Gls)
2023–2024	Zenit Saint Petersburg	3	(0)
2023–2024	→ Zenit-2 St. Petersburg	19	(3)
2024–	Orenburg	14	(0)
2025–	→ Orenburg-2	3	(1)
2025–2026	→ Ufa (loan)	17	(1)

International career^{‡}
2019–2020	Russia U15	4	(2)
2021	Russia U16	7	(2)
2021–2022	Russia U17	5	(2)
2022	Russia U18	4	(2)
2023	Russia U19	1	(0)
2023	Russia U21	1	(0)
- * Club domestic league appearances and goals as of 16 May 2026 ‡ National team caps and goals as of 15 June 2023

Aleksey Timofeyevich Baranovsky (Russian: Алексей Тимофеевич Барановский; born 25 January 2005) is a Russian football player who plays as a centre-forward for Orenburg.

== Career ==
Baranovsky joined the senior squad of Zenit St. Petersburg in the summer of 2022. On 13 January 2023, he extended his contract with Zenit until June 2026.

Baranovsky made his debut in the Russian Premier League for Zenit on 20 May 2023 in a game against Orenburg.

On 21 June 2024, Baranovsky moved to Orenburg. On 4 September 2025, he was loaned by Ufa.

== Career statistics ==
=== Club ===
As of match played 16 May 2026

Appearances and goals by club, season and competition
Club	Season	League			Cup		Total	
Club	Season	Division	Apps	Goals	Apps	Goals	Apps	Goals
Zenit St. Petersburg	2022–23	Russian Premier League	3	0	—		3	0
Zenit-2 Saint Petersburg	2023	Russian Second League B	8	1	—		8	1
Zenit-2 Saint Petersburg	2024	Russian Second League B	11	2	—		11	2
Zenit-2 Saint Petersburg	Total		19	3	0	0	19	3
Orenburg	2024–25	Russian Premier League	13	0	6	1	19	1
Orenburg	2025–26	Russian Premier League	1	0	2	0	3	0
Orenburg	Total		14	0	8	1	22	1
Orenburg-2	2025	Russian Second League B	3	1	—		3	1
Ufa (loan)	2025–26	Russian First League	17	1	3	0	20	1
Career total			56	6	11	1	67	6

== Honours ==
=== Club ===
Zenit Saint Petersburg

- Russian Premier League: 2022–23
