= Daniil Odoyevsky =

Russian footballer (born 2003)

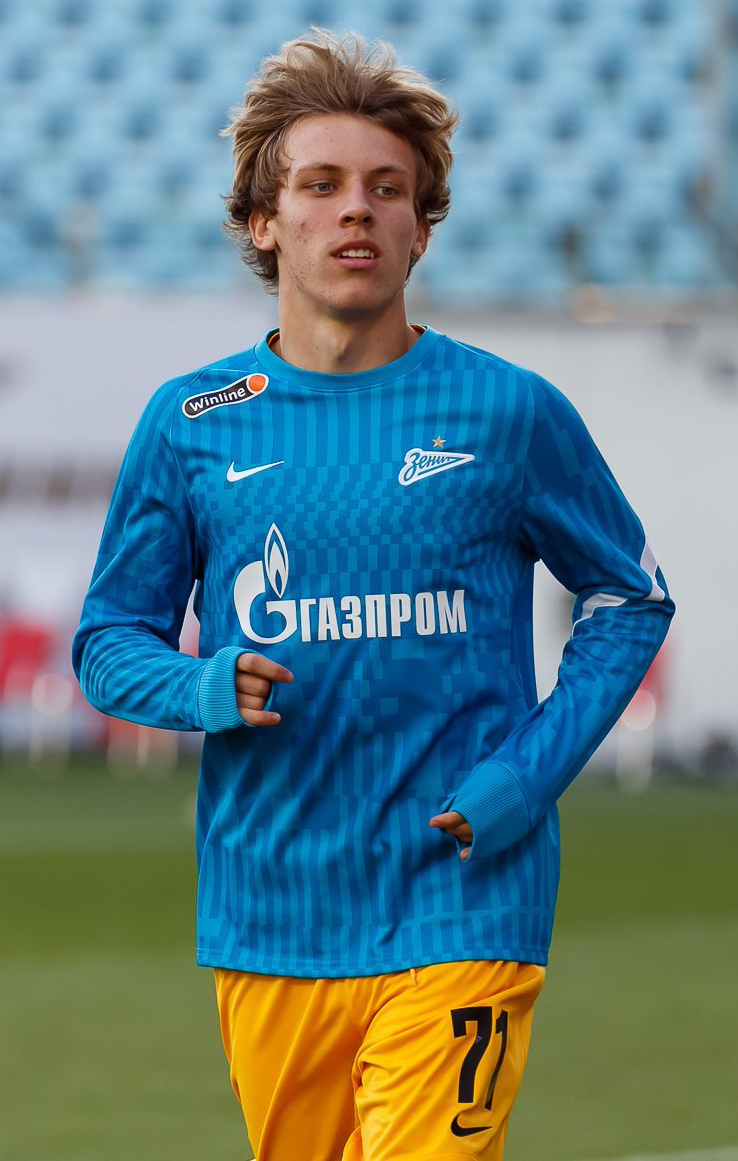
- Odoyevsky with Zenit Saint Petersburg in 2021

Personal information
- Full name: Daniil Sergeyevich Odoyevsky
- Date of birth: 22 January 2003 (age 23)
- Place of birth: Saint Petersburg, Russia
- Height: 1.90 m (6 ft 3 in)
- Position: Goalkeeper

Team information
- Current team: Zenit Saint Petersburg
- Number: 71

Youth career
- Zenit Saint Petersburg

Senior career*
Years	Team	Apps	(Gls)
2019–2021	Zenit-2 Saint Petersburg	14	(0)
2020–	Zenit Saint Petersburg	9	(0)
2023–2024	→ Volgar Astrakhan (loan)	25	(0)
2024–2026	→ Rostov (loan)	10	(0)

International career^{‡}
2018–2019	Russia U16	7	(0)
2019–2020	Russia U17	5	(0)
2021	Russia U18	1	(0)
2021	Russia U19	2	(0)
- * Club domestic league appearances and goals as of 21 April 2026 ‡ National team caps and goals as of 7 September 2021

Daniil Sergeyevich Odoyevsky (Russian: Дании́л Серге́евич Одо́евский; born 22 January 2003) is a Russian football player who plays for Zenit Saint Petersburg.

== Club career ==
He made his debut in the Russian Premier League for Zenit Saint Petersburg on 16 May 2021 in a game against Tambov.

On 3 July 2023, Odoyevsky extended his contract with Zenit until June 2027.

On 12 July 2023, Odoyevsky moved on loan to Volgar Astrakhan.

On 19 July 2024, he was loaned to Rostov for the 2024–25 season. On 22 June 2025, the loan was renewed for the 2025–26 season.

== Career statistics ==
=== Club ===
As of match played 21 April 2026

Appearances and goals by club, season and competition
Club	Season	League			Cup		Europe		Other		Total	
Club	Season	Division	Apps	Goals	Apps	Goals	Apps	Goals	Apps	Goals	Apps	Goals
FC Zenit-2 Saint Petersburg	2019–20	Russian Second League	3	0	—		—		—		3	0
FC Zenit-2 Saint Petersburg	2020–21	Russian Second League	5	0	—		—		—		5	0
FC Zenit-2 Saint Petersburg	2021–22	Russian Second League	6	0	—		—		—		6	0
FC Zenit-2 Saint Petersburg	Total		14	0	—		—		—		14	0
FC Zenit Saint Petersburg	2020–21	Russian Premier League	1	0	0	0	0	0	0	0	1	0
FC Zenit Saint Petersburg	2021–22	Russian Premier League	4	0	0	0	1 (Note: Appearance in the UEFA Europa League)	0	0	0	5	0
FC Zenit Saint Petersburg	2022–23	Russian Premier League	4	0	0	0	—		1 (Note: Appearance in the Russian Super Cup)	0	5	0
FC Zenit Saint Petersburg	Total		9	0	0	0	1	0	1	0	11	0
Volgar Astrakhan (loan)	2023–24	Russian First League	25	0	1	0	—		—		26	0
Rostov (loan)	2024–25	Russian Premier League	9	0	4	0	—		—		13	0
Rostov (loan)	2025–26	Russian Premier League	1	0	7	0	—		—		8	0
Rostov (loan)	Total		10	0	11	0	0	0	0	0	21	0
Career total			58	0	12	0	1	0	1	0	72	0

== Honours ==
=== Club ===
Zenit Saint Petersburg

- Russian Premier League: 2020–21, 2021–22, 2022–23
- Russian Super Cup: 2022
