= Ivan Sergeyev (footballer) =

Russian footballer (born 1995)

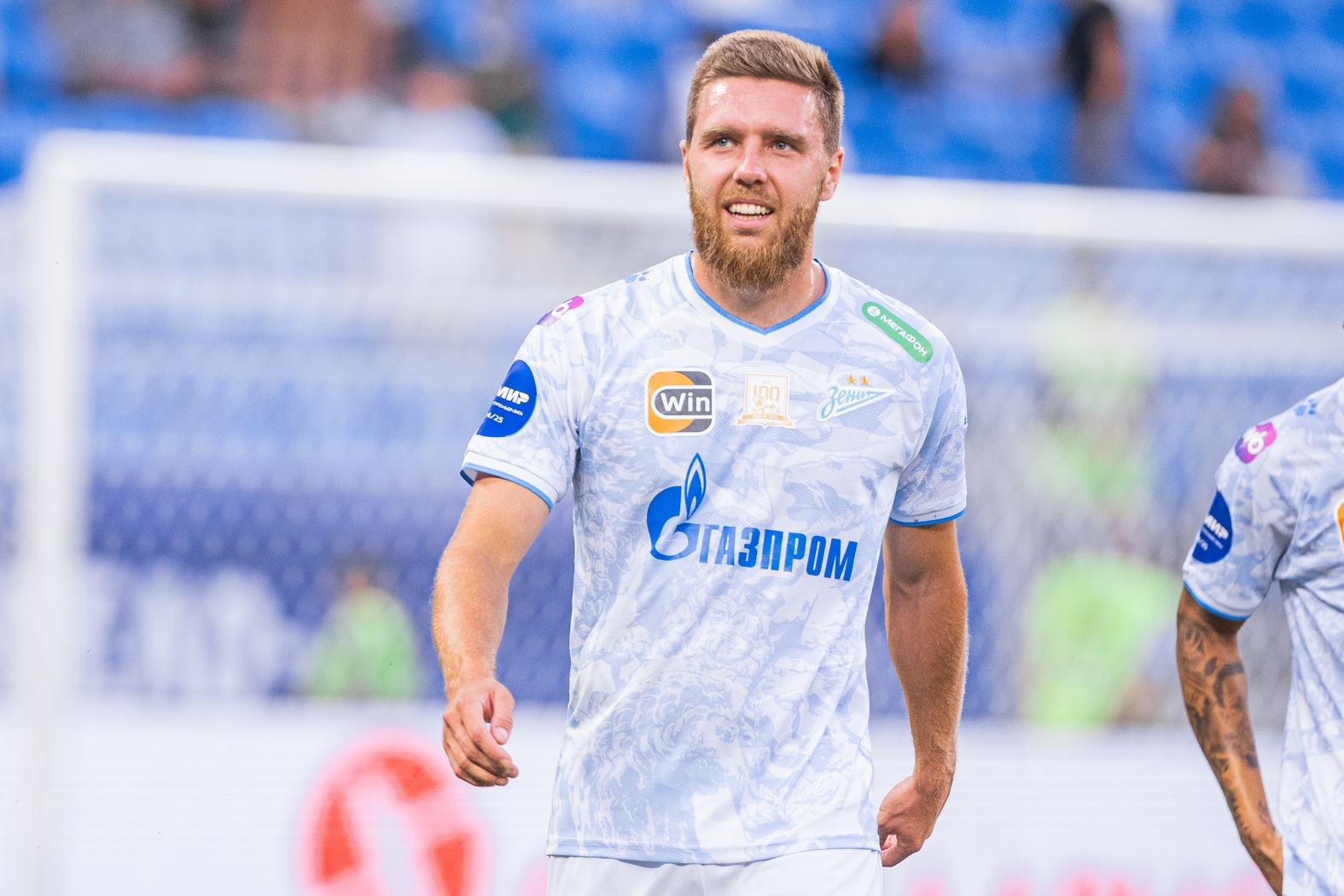
- Sergeyev with Zenit in 2024

Personal information
- Full name: Ivan Vladimirovich Sergeyev
- Date of birth: 11 May 1995 (age 31)
- Place of birth: Cherepovets, Russia
- Height: 1.84 m (6 ft 0 in)
- Position: Forward

Team information
- Current team: Dynamo Moscow
- Number: 33

Youth career
- 2001–2012: DYuSSh Severstal Cherepovets

Senior career*
Years	Team	Apps	(Gls)
2012–2013	Cherepovets-Aist (amateur)		
2013–2017	Strogino Moscow	84	(34)
2016	→ Riga (loan)	7	(1)
2018–2019	Tambov	7	(0)
2018–2019	→ Torpedo Moscow (loan)	26	(16)
2019–2020	Torpedo Moscow	30	(14)
2020–2021	Krylia Sovetov	57	(46)
2022–2024	Zenit Saint Petersburg	66	(20)
2024–2025	Krylia Sovetov	23	(9)
2025–	Dynamo Moscow	44	(9)

International career^{‡}
2023–	Russia	13	(3)
- * Club domestic league appearances and goals as of 22 November 2026 ‡ National team caps and goals as of 9 June 2026

Ivan Vladimirovich Sergeyev (Russian: Иван Владимирович Сергеев; born 11 May 1995) is a Russian professional footballer who plays as a striker for Russian Premier League club Dynamo Moscow and the Russia national team.

== Club career ==
=== Strogino Moscow ===
He made his professional debut in the Russian Professional Football League for Strogino Moscow on 19 April 2014 in a game against Lokomotiv-2 Moscow.

=== Tambov ===
He made his Russian Football National League debut for Tambov on 4 March 2018 in a game against Rotor Volgograd.

=== Torpedo Moscow ===
On 11 June 2019, he signed a 2-year contract with Torpedo Moscow after playing for the club on loan in the 2018–19 season.

=== Krylia Sovetov ===
On 14 August 2020, he signed a 2-year contract with Krylia Sovetov Samara. His first season with Krylia Sovetov was extremely productive, Krylia Sovetov won the 2020–21 Russian Football National League and Sergeyev has set a new record for most goals in one season of the Russian second tier, with 39 goals scored as of 5 May 2021. He finished the season with 40 goals. He made his Russian Premier League debut for Krylia Sovetov Samara on 25 July 2021 in a game against Akhmat Grozny.

=== Zenit Saint Petersburg ===
On 10 January 2022, Zenit Saint Petersburg announced the signing of Sergeyev with a 3-season contract.

On 7 May 2023, Sergeyev scored an added-time winner in a game against Spartak Moscow that secured the 2022–23 Russian Premier League title for Zenit.

=== Return to Krylia Sovetov ===
On 5 September 2024, Sergeyev returned to Krylia Sovetov on a three-year contract. On 1 December 2024, he scored twice and was chosen man of the match on his return to Gazprom Arena, as Krylia Sovetov defeated Zenit with the score of 3–2.

=== Dynamo Moscow ===
On 4 July 2025, Sergeyev signed a contract with Dynamo Moscow for three seasons, with an option to extend for fourth.

== International career ==
He was called up to the Russia national football team for the first time in October 2021 for the World Cup qualifiers against Cyprus and Croatia. He was included in the extended 41-players list of candidates. He made his debut on 16 October 2023 in a friendly against Kenya.

== Career statistics ==
=== Club ===
As of match played 22 November 2026

Appearances and goals by club, season and competition
Club	Season	League			National cup (Note: Includes Russian Cup, Latvian Football Cup)		Europe		Other		Total	
Club	Season	Division	Apps	Goals	Apps	Goals	Apps	Goals	Apps	Goals	Apps	Goals
Strogino Moscow	2013–14	Russian Second League	6	0	—		—		—		6	0
Strogino Moscow	2014–15	Russian Second League	29	6	1	0	—		—		30	6
Strogino Moscow	2015–16	Russian Second League	23	10	1	0	—		—		24	10
Strogino Moscow	2016–17	Russian Second League	10	2	—		—		—		10	2
Strogino Moscow	2017–18	Russian Second League	16	16	1	1	—		—		17	17
Strogino Moscow	Total		84	34	3	1	—		—		87	35
Riga (loan)	2016	Virslīga	7	1	1	0	—		—		8	1
Tambov	2017–18	Russian First League	7	0	—		—		6 (Note: One appearance in promotion play-offs, five appearances in the FNL Cup)	0	13	0
Torpedo Moscow	2018–19	Russian Second League	26	16	4	2	—		—		30	18
Torpedo Moscow	2019–20	Russian First League	27	14	4	3	—		—		31	17
Torpedo Moscow	2020–21	Russian First League	3	0	—		—		—		3	0
Torpedo Moscow	Total		56	30	8	5	—		—		64	35
Krylia Sovetov Samara	2020–21	Russian First League	39	40	7	3	—		—		46	43
Krylia Sovetov Samara	2021–22	Russian Premier League	18	6	2	2	—		—		20	8
Krylia Sovetov Samara	Total		57	46	9	5	—		—		66	50
Zenit Saint Petersburg	2021–22	Russian Premier League	11	4	2	1	2 (Note: Appearances in UEFA Europa League)	0	—		15	5
Zenit Saint Petersburg	2022–23	Russian Premier League	26	10	7	3	—		1 (Note: Appearance in Russian Super Cup)	0	34	13
Zenit Saint Petersburg	2023–24	Russian Premier League	26	6	12	5	—		1	0	39	11
Zenit Saint Petersburg	2024–25	Russian Premier League	3	0	2	0	—		0	0	5	0
Zenit Saint Petersburg	Total		66	20	23	9	2	0	2	0	93	29
Krylia Sovetov Samara	2024–25	Russian Premier League	23	9	2	0	—		—		25	9
Dynamo Moscow	2025–26	Russian Premier League	29	9	11	3	—		—		40	12
Dynamo Moscow	2026–27	Russian Premier League	15	0	5	1	—		—		20	1
Dynamo Moscow	Total		44	9	16	4	0	0	0	0	60	13
Career total			344	149	62	24	2	0	8	0	416	173

=== International ===
As of match played 9 June 2026

Appearances and goals by national team and year
National team	Year	Apps	Goals
Russia	2023	1	0
Russia	2024	2	1
Russia	2025	8	2
Russia	2026	2	0
Total		13	3

==== International goals ====
Scores and results list Russia's goal tally first.

No.	Date	Venue	Opponent	Score	Result	Competition
1	21 March 2024	VTB Arena, Moscow, Russia	Serbia	4–0	4–0	Friendly
2.	7 September 2025	Jassim bin Hamad Stadium, Al Rayyan, Qatar	Qatar	3–0	4–1	Friendly
3.	14 October 2025	VTB Arena, Moscow, Russia	Bolivia	3–0	3–0	Friendly

== Honours ==
=== Torpedo Moscow ===
- Russian Professional Football League (Zone Center): 2019

=== Krylia Sovetov Samara ===
- Russian Football National League: 2021

=== Zenit Saint Petersburg ===
- Russian Premier League: 2021–22, 2022–23, 2023–24
- Russian Cup: 2023–24
- Russian Super Cup: 2022, 2023, 2024

=== Individual ===
- Russian Professional Football League Zone Center top scorer (16 goals) (2017–18)
- Russian Professional Football League Zone Center top scorer (16 goals) (2018–19).
- Russian Football National League top scorer (14 goals) (2019–20).
- Russian Football National League top scorer (40 goals) (2020–21).
- Russian Premier League goal of the month: March 2025 (first goal on 28 March 2025 against Lokomotiv Moscow).
