= Daniil Chernyakov =

Russian footballer (born 2001)

Personal information
- Full name: Daniil Romanovich Chernyakov
- Date of birth: 7 January 2001 (age 25)
- Height: 1.78 m (5 ft 10 in)
- Position: Midfielder

Team information
- Current team: Metallurg Lipetsk
- Number: 14

Youth career
- Lokomotiv Moscow

Senior career*
Years	Team	Apps	(Gls)
2020–2022	Kazanka Moscow	32	(0)
2022–2024	Fakel Voronezh	4	(0)
2023–2024	→ Metallurg Lipetsk (loan)	26	(1)
2024–2025	Chayka Peschanokopskoye	17	(0)
2025–	Metallurg Lipetsk	24	(1)

International career^{‡}
2017	Russia U16	2	(0)
2017	Russia U17	4	(0)
2018	Russia U18	2	(0)
- * Club domestic league appearances and goals as of 31 October 2026 ‡ National team caps and goals as of 16 October 2018

Daniil Romanovich Chernyakov (Russian: Даниил Романович Черняков; born 7 January 2001) is a Russian footballer who plays as a midfielder for Metallurg Lipetsk.

== Club career ==
Chernyakov made his debut for Fakel Voronezh on 31 August 2022 in a Russian Cup game against Zenit Saint Petersburg. He made his Russian Premier League debut for Fakel on 22 October 2022 in a game against FC Rostov.

On 3 August 2023, Chernyakov joined Russian Second League club Metallurg Lipetsk on loan for the 2023–24 season, with an option for Fakel to terminate the loan early at the end of 2023.

On 25 June 2024, Chernyakov signed a two-year contract with Chayka Peschanokopskoye.

== Career statistics ==
As of 27 November 2022

Club	Season	League			Cup		Continental		Total	
Club	Season	Division	Apps	Goals	Apps	Goals	Apps	Goals	Apps	Goals
Kazanka Moscow	2020–21	Second League	22	0	–		–		22	0
Kazanka Moscow	2021–22	Second League	10	0	–		–		10	0
Kazanka Moscow	Total		32	0	0	0	0	0	32	0
Fakel Voronezh	2022–23	RPL	4	0	4	0	–		8	0
Career total			36	0	4	0	0	0	40	0
