= List of Russian football transfers summer 2026 =

This is a list of Russian football transfers in the 2026 summer transfer window by club. Only clubs of the 2026–27 Russian Premier League are included.

== Russian Premier League 2026–27 ==
=== Akhmat Grozny ===
In: Note: Flags indicate national team as defined under FIFA eligibility rules; some limited exceptions apply. Players may hold more than one non-FIFA nationality.

No.	Pos.	Nation	Player
6	MF	MLI	Kalidou Sidibé (from (France) Guingamp)
10	MF	RUS	Kirill Shchetinin (from Rostov)
18	MF	BRA	Júlio Romão (from (Hungary) Ferencváros)
54	DF	RUS	Kirill Kistenyov (on loan from Krasnodar)
71	GK	RUS	Rasul Mitsayev (from Veles Moscow)
76	FW	ALB	Erald Maksuti (from (Albania) Flamurtari)
95	DF	RUS	Arsen Adamov (from Zenit St. Petersburg)
97	FW	RUS	Aleksey Kasadzhikov (from Zenit St. Petersburg academy)

Out: Note: Flags indicate national team as defined under FIFA eligibility rules; some limited exceptions apply. Players may hold more than one non-FIFA nationality.

No.	Pos.	Nation	Player
2	DF	RUS	Dzhamalutdin Abdulkadyrov (end of loan from CSKA Moscow)
9	MF	ARG	Braian Mansilla (on loan to Rodina Moscow)
10	MF	RUS	Rifat Zhemaletdinov
22	DF	IRI	Mohammadmehdi Zare (to (Iran) Persepolis)
27	MF	RUS	Akhmed Davlitgereyev (on loan to Ufa, previously from Nart Cherkessk, previously on loan from Nart)
37	MF	SEN	Papa Amady Gadio (on loan to (Serbia) Novi Pazar)
40	DF	RUS	Rizvan Utsiyev (retired)
72	GK	RUS	Yakhya Magomedov (on loan to Tyumen)
80	DF	RUS	Valeri Tsarukyan (end of loan from Pari Nizhny Novgorod)
82	DF	RUS	Daniil Khlusevich (end of loan from Spartak Moscow)
—	FW	MAR	Anas El Mahraoui (on loan to (Morocco) MAS, previously on loan to Orenburg)
—	FW	ARG	Mauro Luna Diale (on loan to (Argentina) Unión de Santa Fe, previously on loan to (Argentina) Platense)

=== Akron Tolyatti ===
In: Note: Flags indicate national team as defined under FIFA eligibility rules; some limited exceptions apply. Players may hold more than one non-FIFA nationality.

No.	Pos.	Nation	Player
6	MF	ARM	Karlen Hovhannisyan (from (Armenia) Pyunik)
9	FW	SRB	Slobodan Tedić (from (Serbia) Čukarički)
11	FW	BRA	Dudu Rodrigues (on loan from (Greece) Aris)
13	DF	RUS	Vyacheslav Bardybakhin (end of loan to Rotor Volgograd)
14	MF	RUS	Yuri Zheleznov (from Ural Yekaterinburg)
17	MF	RUS	Artyom Sidorenko (from Nizhny Novgorod)
55	MF	SRB	Milutin Vidosavljević (on loan from (Serbia) Vojvodina)
99	FW	BLR	Artyom Shumansky (on loan from CSKA Moscow)

Out: Note: Flags indicate national team as defined under FIFA eligibility rules; some limited exceptions apply. Players may hold more than one non-FIFA nationality.

No.	Pos.	Nation	Player
3	DF	BRA	Paulo Vitor (released, previously on loan to (Portugal) AVS)
6	MF	RUS	Maksim Kuzmin (to Sochi)
7	FW	ARM	Edgar Sevikyan (end of loan from (Hungary) Ferencváros)
22	FW	RUS	Artem Dzyuba
35	MF	BIH	Ifet Đakovac (to (Serbia) Vojvodina)
—	GK	RUS	Sergey Volkov (to Rodina Moscow, previously on loan)
—	DF	MKD	Bojan Dimoski (to (North Macedonia) Shkëndija, previously on loan to (Serbia) TSC)
—	MF	RUS	Kirill Danilin (to (Belarus) Gomel, previously on loan)

=== Baltika Kaliningrad ===
In: Note: Flags indicate national team as defined under FIFA eligibility rules; some limited exceptions apply. Players may hold more than one non-FIFA nationality.

No.	Pos.	Nation	Player
1	GK	RUS	Yevgeni Latyshonok (on loan from Nizhny Novgorod)
3	DF	RUS	Ilya Kirsh (from Zenit St. Petersburg)
7	MF	RUS	Konstantin Shiltsov (from Neftekhimik Nizhnekamsk)
11	FW	RUS	Ilya Porokhov (from Shinnik Yaroslavl)
18	DF	MAR	Fahd Moufi (from Orenburg)
19	DF	RUS	Maksim Shnaptsev (from Pari Nizhny Novgorod)
21	DF	PAN	Eduardo Anderson (from (Panama) Alianza, previously on loan)
24	DF	FRA	Loris Mouyokolo (from (France) Grenoble)
66	DF	RUS	Dmitry Begun (end of loan to Tyumen)
69	FW	RUS	Yegor Golenkov (from Rostov)

Out: Note: Flags indicate national team as defined under FIFA eligibility rules; some limited exceptions apply. Players may hold more than one non-FIFA nationality.

No.	Pos.	Nation	Player
11	MF	BLR	Yury Kavalyow (to (Belarus) BATE Borisov)
11	MF	RUS	Nikolai Titkov (to Lokomotiv Moscow)
15	FW	NGR	Tenton Yenne (on loan to (Turkey) Vanspor)
16	DF	COL	Kevin Andrade (to Zenit St. Petersburg)
17	FW	RUS	Kirill Nikishin (on loan to Neftekhimik Nizhnekamsk)
18	FW	BRA	Derik Lacerda (end of loan from (Brazil) Cuiabá)
39	FW	RUS	Kirill Stepanov (on loan to Sibir Novosibirsk, previously on loan to Volga Ulyanovsk)
40	FW	RUS	Dmitry Nikitin (on loan to Leningradets Leningrad Oblast, previously on loan to Sibir Novosibirsk)
46	DF	RUS	Kirill Obonin (end of loan from Zenit-2 St. Petersburg)
67	GK	RUS	Maksim Borisko (to CSKA Moscow)
69	MF	RUS	Irakli Manelov (on loan to Rotor Volgograd)
—	DF	RUS	Nikita Bozov (on loan to Torpedo Moscow, previously on loan to Shinnik Yaroslavl)
—	MF	RUS	Yaroslav Arbuzov (on loan to Shinnik Yaroslavl, previously on loan to Rotor Volgograd)
—	FW	RUS	Abu-Said Eldarushev (to Rotor Volgograd, previously on loan)

=== CSKA Moscow ===
In: Note: Flags indicate national team as defined under FIFA eligibility rules; some limited exceptions apply. Players may hold more than one non-FIFA nationality.

No.	Pos.	Nation	Player
19	MF	RUS	Ivan Oleynikov (from Krylia Sovetov Samara)
21	DF	ALG	Mohamed Azzi (from Dynamo Makhachkala)
23	DF	RUS	Dzhamalutdin Abdulkadyrov (end of loan to Akhmat Grozny)
39	GK	RUS	Maksim Borisko (from Baltika Kaliningrad)

Out: Note: Flags indicate national team as defined under FIFA eligibility rules; some limited exceptions apply. Players may hold more than one non-FIFA nationality.

No.	Pos.	Nation	Player
8	FW	BLR	Artyom Shumansky (on loan to Akron Tolyatti, previously on loan to Krylia Sovetov Samara)
14	FW	RUS	Yegor Ushakov (to Rodina-2 Moscow)
19	FW	COL	Daniel Ruiz (end of loan from (Colombia) Millonarios)
—	DF	RUS	Ilya Agapov (to Ufa, previously on loan)
—	DF	IRI	Amirhossein Reyvandi (released, previously on loan to (Croatia) Jarun Zagreb)
—	MF	RUS	Maksim Mukhin (to Rostov, previously on loan to Sochi)
—	FW	MLI	Sékou Koïta (to (Turkey) Gençlerbirliği, previously on loan)
—	FW	RUS	Gleb Popolitov (on loan to Pari Nizhny Novgorod, previously on loan to Chayka Peschanokopskoye)

=== Dynamo Makhachkala ===
In: Note: Flags indicate national team as defined under FIFA eligibility rules; some limited exceptions apply. Players may hold more than one non-FIFA nationality.

No.	Pos.	Nation	Player
6	MF	RUS	Marat Apshatsev (on loan from Rubin Kazan)
8	MF	RUS	Vladimir Khubulov (from Krylia Sovetov Samara)
14	MF	RUS	Daler Kuzyayev (from Rubin Kazan)
23	DF	UZB	Makhmud Makhamadzhonov (from (Uzbekistan) Andijon)
24	DF	COL	Andrés Alarcón (from (Colombia) Patriotas, previously on loan)
30	MF	RUS	Dmitri Aleksandrov (on loan from Dynamo Moscow)
52	MF	RUS	Yegor Smelov (from Dynamo Moscow)
88	MF	RUS	Daniil Lesovoy (on loan from Pari Nizhny Novgorod)

Out: Note: Flags indicate national team as defined under FIFA eligibility rules; some limited exceptions apply. Players may hold more than one non-FIFA nationality.

No.	Pos.	Nation	Player
5	DF	GEO	Jemal Tabidze (to (Turkey) Kayserispor)
6	MF	MAR	El Mehdi El Moubarik (end of loan from (United Arab Emirates) Al Ain)
7	FW	TUN	Hazem Mastouri (to (Tunisia) Espérance Tunis)
17	DF	SLO	Jan Đapo
22	DF	ALG	Mohamed Azzi (to CSKA Moscow)
55	FW	ALG	Diaa Eddine Mechid (on loan to (Algeria) ES Ben Aknoun)
98	FW	RUS	Gadzhi Budunov (on loan to Mashuk-KMV Pyatigorsk)
—	MF	RUS	Shamil Gadzhiyev (on loan to Pobeda Khasavyurt, previously on loan to (Belarus) Naftan Novopolotsk)
—	MF	RUS	Shamil Isayev (to Ufa, previously on loan)
—	MF	RUS	Anton Krachkovsky (to Mashuk-KMV Pyatigorsk, previously on loan to Chernomorets Novorossiysk)
—	FW	RUS	Kirill Pomeshkin (on loan to Mashuk-KMV Pyatigorsk, previously on loan to Chernomorets Novorossiysk)

=== Dynamo Moscow ===
In: Note: Flags indicate national team as defined under FIFA eligibility rules; some limited exceptions apply. Players may hold more than one non-FIFA nationality.

No.	Pos.	Nation	Player
28	MF	CHI	Maximiliano Gutiérrez (from (Argentina) Independiente)
34	MF	GEO	Luka Gagnidze (end of loan to (Spain) Granada)
77	MF	HAI	Josué Casimir (on loan from (France) Auxerre)

Out: Note: Flags indicate national team as defined under FIFA eligibility rules; some limited exceptions apply. Players may hold more than one non-FIFA nationality.

No.	Pos.	Nation	Player
13	FW	CMR	Moumi Ngamaleu (to (Cyprus) Pafos)
14	FW	MAR	El Mehdi Maouhoub (on loan to (United Arab Emirates) Dubai United)
17	FW	RUS	Ulvi Babayev (on loan to Rubin Kazan)
30	MF	RUS	Dmitri Aleksandrov (on loan to Dynamo Makhachkala)
47	GK	BLR	Andrey Kudravets (on loan to (Belarus) Dinamo Minsk)
52	MF	RUS	Yegor Smelov (to Dynamo Makhachkala, previously on loan to Pari Nizhny Novgorod)
—	DF	RUS	Ivan Lepsky (to Krylia Sovetov Samara, previously on loan)
—	MF	RUS	Yegor Nazarenko (on loan to Orenburg, previously on loan to Spartak Kostroma)
—	FW	RUS	Denis Bokov (on loan to Ural Yekaterinburg, previously on loan to Spartak Kostroma)

=== Fakel Voronezh ===
In: Note: Flags indicate national team as defined under FIFA eligibility rules; some limited exceptions apply. Players may hold more than one non-FIFA nationality.

No.	Pos.	Nation	Player
7	FW	RUS	Maksim Turishchev (from Rostov, previously on loan)
11	MF	RUS	Aleksei Sutormin (from Krylia Sovetov Samara)
17	MF	BLR	Anton Kavalyow (end of loan to (Belarus) BATE Borisov)
22	DF	MAR	Hodaifa El Mhassani (from (Morocco) FUS Rabat)
35	GK	RUS	Vyacheslav Dorovskikh (end of loan to Kaluga)
40	DF	BRA	Clayton (on loan from (Brazil) Internacional)
53	DF	RUS	Matvey Bardachyov (on loan from Zenit St. Petersburg)
90	FW	RUS	Aleksandr Koksharov (on loan from Krasnodar)

Out: Note: Flags indicate national team as defined under FIFA eligibility rules; some limited exceptions apply. Players may hold more than one non-FIFA nationality.

No.	Pos.	Nation	Player
2	DF	RUS	Vasili Cherov (to Ufa)
11	MF	MDA	Nichita Moțpan (to SKA-Khabarovsk)
70	MF	RUS	Nuri Abdokov (on loan to Veles Moscow)
93	MF	RUS	Merabi Uridia
95	DF	RUS	Ilya Gaponov
—	DF	RUS	Maks Dziov (on loan to Volga Ulyanovsk, previously on loan to (Belarus) Dynamo Brest)
—	FW	RUS	Luka Bagateliya (to Volga Ulyanovsk, previously on loan)
—	FW	RUS	Georgi Gongadze (to Ufa, previously on loan to Chelyabinsk)

=== Krasnodar ===
In: Note: Flags indicate national team as defined under FIFA eligibility rules; some limited exceptions apply. Players may hold more than one non-FIFA nationality.

No.	Pos.	Nation	Player
2	DF	URU	Maizon Rodríguez (from (Argentina) Unión de Santa Fe)
10	FW	RUS	Dmitry Vorobyov (from Lokomotiv Moscow)
18	MF	BRA	Christian (from (Brazil) Cruzeiro)
21	MF	RUS	Magomed Ozdoyev (from (Greece) PAOK)
40	DF	RUS	Ilya Vakhaniya (from Rostov)
47	MF	RUS	Daniil Utkin (from Rostov)

Out: Note: Flags indicate national team as defined under FIFA eligibility rules; some limited exceptions apply. Players may hold more than one non-FIFA nationality.

No.	Pos.	Nation	Player
2	DF	RUS	Vitali Stezhko (on loan to Ural Yekaterinburg)
4	DF	BRA	Diego Costa (on loan to (Greece) PAOK)
7	FW	BRA	Victor Sá (to (Brazil) São Paulo)
10	MF	ARM	Eduard Spertsyan (to (Saudi Arabia) Al-Ahli)
20	DF	URU	Giovanni González (to (Argentina) River Plate)
67	FW	RUS	Kazbek Mukailov (on loan to Krylia Sovetov Samara)
90	FW	NGR	Moses Cobnan (on loan to (Greece) Levadiakos)
96	FW	RUS	Aleksandr Koksharov (on loan to Fakel Voronezh)
—	GK	RUS	Daniil Golikov (on loan to Rostov, previously on loan to Chelyabinsk)
—	DF	RUS	Kirill Kistenyov (on loan to Akhmat Grozny, previously on loan to Veles Moscow)
—	MF	BRA	Gustavo Furtado (on loan to (Greece) Volos, previously on loan to Sochi)
—	MF	RUS	Dmitry Kuchugura (to Veles Moscow, previously on loan to Neftekhimik Nizhnekamsk)
—	MF	RUS	Mikhail Umnikov (on loan to Rotor Volgograd, previously on loan to Volga Ulyanovsk)
—	FW	RUS	Yevgeny Kovalevsky (on loan to Volgar Astrakhan, previously on loan to Kuban Krasnodar)
—	FW	NGR	Olakunle Olusegun (to Rostov, previously on loan to Pari Nizhny Novgorod)

=== Krylia Sovetov Samara ===
In: Note: Flags indicate national team as defined under FIFA eligibility rules; some limited exceptions apply. Players may hold more than one non-FIFA nationality.

No.	Pos.	Nation	Player
4	DF	RUS	Yuri Gorshkov (from Zenit St. Petersburg)
10	FW	SLO	Martin Kramarič (from Sochi)
14	MF	RUS	Nikita Saltykov (on loan from Lokomotiv Moscow)
17	MF	KAZ	Islam Chesnokov (on loan from (Kazakhstan) Tobol)
18	DF	RUS	Ivan Lepsky (from Dynamo Moscow, previously on loan)
23	DF	RUS	Nikita Chernov (from Spartak Moscow, previously on loan)
67	FW	RUS	Kazbek Mukailov (on loan from Krasnodar)
73	FW	RUS	Vladislav Shitov (end of loan to Torpedo Moscow)
77	FW	RUS	Denis Makarov (from (Turkey) Kayserispor)
97	MF	RUS	Ilzat Akhmetov (from Zenit St. Petersburg, previously on loan)

Out: Note: Flags indicate national team as defined under FIFA eligibility rules; some limited exceptions apply. Players may hold more than one non-FIFA nationality.

No.	Pos.	Nation	Player
6	MF	RUS	Sergei Babkin (to Lokomotiv Moscow)
9	MF	RUS	Aleksei Sutormin (to Fakel Voronezh)
9	FW	NGR	Geoffrey Chinedu (on loan to (Cyprus) AEL Limassol)
10	MF	RUS	Vladimir Khubulov (to Dynamo Makhachkala)
17	MF	RUS	Ivan Bobyor (to Nizhny Novgorod, previously on loan to Neftekhimik Nizhnekamsk)
19	MF	RUS	Ivan Oleynikov (to CSKA Moscow)
24	DF	RUS	Roman Yevgenyev (to Pari Nizhny Novgorod)
31	DF	ARG	Gonzalo Requena (end of loan from (Argentina) Instituto)
65	DF	RUS	Ilya Gribakin (to Chelyabinsk)
70	FW	BLR	Artyom Shumansky (end of loan from CSKA Moscow)
91	FW	RUS	Vladimir Ignatenko (to Nizhny Novgorod)
—	MF	RUS	Dmytro Ivanisenya (on loan to Tekstilshchik Ivanovo, previously on loan to Ural Yekaterinburg)
—	MF	RUS	Nikita Pershin (on loan to Tekstilshchik Ivanovo, previously on loan to Chelyabinsk)
—	FW	RUS	Pavel Popov (to Volna Nizhny Novgorod Oblast, previously on loan to Veles Moscow)

=== Lokomotiv Moscow ===
In: Note: Flags indicate national team as defined under FIFA eligibility rules; some limited exceptions apply. Players may hold more than one non-FIFA nationality.

No.	Pos.	Nation	Player
6	MF	RUS	Sergei Babkin (from Krylia Sovetov Samara)
8	MF	RUS	Aleksandr Kovalenko (on loan from Sochi)
14	DF	RUS	Georgi Dzhikiya (from (Turkey) Antalyaspor)
18	MF	RUS	Nikolai Titkov (from Baltika Kaliningrad)
77	MF	RUS	Andrei Mostovoy (on loan from Zenit St. Petersburg)

Out: Note: Flags indicate national team as defined under FIFA eligibility rules; some limited exceptions apply. Players may hold more than one non-FIFA nationality.

No.	Pos.	Nation	Player
8	FW	RUS	Vladislav Sarveli (to Pari Nizhny Novgorod)
10	MF	RUS	Aleksey Batrakov (to (Turkey) Galatasaray)
10	FW	RUS	Dmitry Vorobyov (to Krasnodar)
14	MF	RUS	Nikita Saltykov (on loan to Krylia Sovetov Samara)
25	MF	RUS	Danil Prutsev (end of loan from Spartak Moscow)
93	MF	RUS	Artyom Karpukas (to Zenit St. Petersburg)
94	MF	RUS	Artyom Timofeyev (to Pari Nizhny Novgorod)
—	GK	RUS	Timofey Mitrov (on loan to Sochi, previously from Shinnik Yaroslavl)
—	DF	BLR	Arseny Ageyev (on loan to (Belarus) Torpedo-BelAZ Zhodino, previously on loan to (Belarus) Slavia Mozyr)
—	DF	UKR	Mark Mampassi (to (Norway) Rosenborg, previously on loan to (Azerbaijan) Turan Tovuz)
—	FW	RUS	Artyom Korneyev (on loan to Tekstilshchik Ivanovo, previously on loan to Sochi)

=== Orenburg ===
In: Note: Flags indicate national team as defined under FIFA eligibility rules; some limited exceptions apply. Players may hold more than one non-FIFA nationality.

No.	Pos.	Nation	Player
7	FW	COL	Jersson González (on loan from (Colombia) Independiente Santa Fe)
11	MF	RUS	Yegor Nazarenko (on loan from Dynamo Moscow)
14	MF	COL	Robert Mejía (from (Colombia) Once Caldas)
18	MF	RUS	Dmitri Vasilyev (from Zenit St. Petersburg)
21	FW	ARG	Benjamín Bosch (on loan from (Argentina) Talleres)
22	DF	BLR	Anton Lukashov (from (Belarus) Slavia Mozyr)
24	DF	COD	Maxime Sivis (from (Romania) Dinamo București)
35	GK	RUS	Aleksandr Dyogtev (on loan from Zenit St. Petersburg)
44	DF	POR	João Silva (from (Brazil) Sport Recife)
59	DF	RUS	Maksim Syshchenko (end of loan to Chernomorets Novorossiysk)
77	FW	RUS	Andrey Kasadzhikov (on loan from Zenit St. Petersburg)
94	MF	RUS	Aleksey Baranovsky (end of loan to Ufa)

Out: Note: Flags indicate national team as defined under FIFA eligibility rules; some limited exceptions apply. Players may hold more than one non-FIFA nationality.

No.	Pos.	Nation	Player
7	FW	TUR	Emircan Gürlük (to (Turkey) Çorum)
11	FW	RUS	Stepan Oganesyan (to Torpedo Moscow)
18	DF	MAR	Fahd Moufi (to Baltika Kaliningrad)
22	MF	ARM	Pavel Gorelov (to Rotor Volgograd)
29	FW	MAR	Anas El Mahraoui (end of loan from Akhmat Grozny)
32	DF	PAR	Alexis Cantero (end of loan from (Paraguay) Olimpia)
59	MF	ARM	Tigran Avanesyan (end of loan from Arsenal Tula)
33	MF	GEO	Irakli Kvekveskiri
37	MF	BRA	Du Queiroz (end of loan from Zenit St. Petersburg)
95	GK	RUS	Andrey Khodanovich (on loan to Volga Ulyanovsk)
99	GK	RUS	Nikolai Sysuyev
—	MF	MNE	Vladan Bubanja (on loan to (Romania) Rapid București, previously on loan to (Croatia) Osijek)
—	MF	RUS	Nikolay Koserik (to Orenburg-2, previously on loan to Mashuk-KMV Pyatigorsk)
—	FW	RUS	Ivan Ignatyev (released, previously on loan to Arsenal Tula)
—	FW	BLR	Timofey Martynov (on loan to (Belarus) Isloch Minsk Raion, previously on loan to (Belarus) Dnepr Mogilev)
—	FW	RUS	Atsamaz Revazov (on loan to Rotor Volgograd, previously on loan to KAMAZ Naberezhnye Chelny)

=== Rodina Moscow ===
In: Note: Flags indicate national team as defined under FIFA eligibility rules; some limited exceptions apply. Players may hold more than one non-FIFA nationality.

No.	Pos.	Nation	Player
7	FW	RUS	German Onugkha (from (Turkey) Kayserispor)
8	MF	ESP	Iker Pozo (from (Croatia) Gorica)
11	MF	ARG	Braian Mansilla (on loan from Akhmat Grozny)
13	GK	RUS	Sergey Volkov (from Akron Tolyatti, previously on loan)
15	DF	RUS	Dmitry Shadrintsev (end of loan to Neftekhimik Nizhnekamsk)
19	DF	RUS	Dmitri Tananeyev (end of loan to KAMAZ Naberezhnye Chelny)
20	DF	COL	Deiver Machado (from (France) Nantes)
50	DF	BRA	Rodrigo Becão (on loan from (Turkey) Fenerbahçe)
75	DF	FRA	Mickaël Nadé (on loan from (United Arab Emirates) United)

Out: Note: Flags indicate national team as defined under FIFA eligibility rules; some limited exceptions apply. Players may hold more than one non-FIFA nationality.

No.	Pos.	Nation	Player
7	MF	PAR	Teodoro Arce (on loan to (Ecuador) Emelec)
77	FW	ARM	Arshak Koryan (to SKA-Khabarovsk)

=== Rostov ===
In: Note: Flags indicate national team as defined under FIFA eligibility rules; some limited exceptions apply. Players may hold more than one non-FIFA nationality.

No.	Pos.	Nation	Player
5	MF	RUS	Yaroslav Mikhaylov (from Zenit St. Petersburg)
6	FW	NGR	Olakunle Olusegun (from Krasnodar)
16	MF	RUS	Maksim Mukhin (from CSKA Moscow)
26	DF	RUS	Daniil Khlusevich (from Spartak Moscow)
34	GK	RUS	Daniil Golikov (on loan from Krasnodar)
40	DF	BRA	Ygor Nogueira (from (Azerbaijan) Sabah)
73	FW	RUS	Imran Aznaurov (end of loan to Rotor Volgograd)

Out: Note: Flags indicate national team as defined under FIFA eligibility rules; some limited exceptions apply. Players may hold more than one non-FIFA nationality.

No.	Pos.	Nation	Player
6	DF	RUS	Aleksandr Tarasov (on loan to Spartak Kostroma)
9	FW	IRI	Mohammad Mohebi (to (Croatia) Rijeka)
10	MF	RUS	Kirill Shchetinin (to Akhmat Grozny)
17	FW	RUS	Yegor Golenkov (to Baltika Kaliningrad)
19	MF	ARM	Khoren Bayramyan (to Ural Yekaterinburg)
28	DF	RUS	Yevgeni Chernov
34	DF	EGY	Eyad El Askalany (on loan to (Egypt) Pyramids)
40	DF	RUS	Ilya Vakhaniya (to Krasnodar)
71	GK	RUS	Daniil Odoyevsky (end of loan from Zenit St. Petersburg)
—	DF	BIH	Dennis Hadžikadunić (to (Croatia) Hajduk Split, previously on loan to (Italy) Sampdoria)
—	DF	RUS	Aleksandr Mukhin (to SKA-Khabarovsk, previously on loan)
—	MF	RUS	Daniil Utkin (to Krasnodar, previously on loan to Torpedo Moscow)
—	FW	RUS	Maksim Turishchev (to Fakel Voronezh, previously on loan)

=== Rubin Kazan ===
In: Note: Flags indicate national team as defined under FIFA eligibility rules; some limited exceptions apply. Players may hold more than one non-FIFA nationality.

No.	Pos.	Nation	Player
7	FW	RUS	Ulvi Babayev (on loan from Dynamo Moscow)
13	DF	UZB	Jakhongir Urozov (on loan from (Uzbekistan) Dinamo Samarqand)
14	MF	CHI	Ignacio Saavedra (from Sochi, previously on loan)
18	DF	RUS	Maksim Ignatyev (from Spartak Kostroma)
71	DF	RUS	Ilya Samoshnikov (on loan from Spartak Moscow)
86	GK	RUS	Nikita Korets (end of loan to Torpedo Moscow)
89	MF	RUS	Matvey Ivanov (from Zenit-2 St. Petersburg)

Out: Note: Flags indicate national team as defined under FIFA eligibility rules; some limited exceptions apply. Players may hold more than one non-FIFA nationality.

No.	Pos.	Nation	Player
1	GK	RUS	Aleksei Kenyaykin (to (Azerbaijan) Turan Tovuz)
9	FW	RUS	Aleksandr Lomovitsky (to (Belarus) Torpedo-BelAZ Zhodino)
10	FW	ALB	Mirlind Daku (to Spartak Moscow)
14	MF	RUS	Daler Kuzyayev (to Dynamo Makhachkala)
18	MF	RUS	Marat Apshatsev (on loan to Dynamo Makhachkala)
19	MF	RUS	Oleg Ivanov (retired)
21	MF	RUS	Aleksandr Zotov
24	FW	SRB	Nikola Čumić (to (Serbia) Partizan, previously on loan to (Spain) Zaragoza)
26	DF	SRB	Uroš Drezgić (on loan to (Serbia) Mačva Šabac)
30	MF	RUS	Anton Shvets (retired)
39	GK	RUS	Ilya Yezhov (to Neftekhimik Nizhnekamsk)
87	FW	RUS	Enri Mukba (on loan to Neftekhimik Nizhnekamsk)
96	MF	RUS	Nikita Vasilyev (on loan to Neftekhimik Nizhnekamsk)
—	GK	RUS	Artyom Ismagilov (to Neftekhimik Nizhnekamsk, previously on loan to Shinnik Yaroslavl)
—	MF	RUS	Daniil Rodin (to Leningradets Leningrad Oblast, previously on loan to FC Neftekhimik Nizhnekamsk)
—	FW	ALB	Marvin Çuni (on loan to (Slovenia) Olimpija Ljubljana, previously on loan to (Italy) Bari)
—	FW	IRI	Kasra Taheri (to (Iran) Nassaji Mazandaran, previously on loan to (Iran) Paykan)

=== Spartak Moscow ===
In: Note: Flags indicate national team as defined under FIFA eligibility rules; some limited exceptions apply. Players may hold more than one non-FIFA nationality.

No.	Pos.	Nation	Player
19	FW	ALB	Mirlind Daku (from Rubin Kazan)
25	MF	RUS	Danil Prutsev (end of loan to Lokomotiv Moscow)
33	DF	ESP	Víctor Parada (from (Spain) Alavés)
77	FW	RUS	Anton Zinkovsky (end of loan to Sochi)

Out: Note: Flags indicate national team as defined under FIFA eligibility rules; some limited exceptions apply. Players may hold more than one non-FIFA nationality.

No.	Pos.	Nation	Player
2	DF	MDA	Oleg Reabciuk (to (Belgium) Anderlecht)
11	FW	TTO	Levi García (on loan to (Greece) Panathinaikos)
14	DF	RUS	Ilya Samoshnikov (on loan to Rubin Kazan)
77	FW	COD	Théo Bongonda (to (Saudi Arabia) Al Faisaly)
82	DF	RUS	Daniil Khlusevich (to Rostov, previously on loan to Akhmat Grozny)
91	FW	RUS	Anton Zabolotny (to SKA Rostov-on-Don)
—	DF	RUS	Nikita Chernov (to Krylia Sovetov Samara, previously on loan)
—	DF	RUS	Yegor Guziyev (on loan to Tekstilshchik Ivanovo, previously on loan to Chayka Peschanokopskoye)

=== Zenit Saint Petersburg ===
In: Note: Flags indicate national team as defined under FIFA eligibility rules; some limited exceptions apply. Players may hold more than one non-FIFA nationality.

No.	Pos.	Nation	Player
9	FW	BRA	Felipe Augusto (from (Turkey) Trabzonspor)
25	DF	COL	Kevin Andrade (from Baltika Kaliningrad)
71	GK	RUS	Daniil Odoyevsky (end of loan to Rostov)
82	DF	RUS	Sergei Volkov (end of loan to Sochi)
93	MF	RUS	Artyom Karpukas (from Lokomotiv Moscow)

Out: Note: Flags indicate national team as defined under FIFA eligibility rules; some limited exceptions apply. Players may hold more than one non-FIFA nationality.

No.	Pos.	Nation	Player
1	GK	RUS	Yevgeni Latyshonok (to Nizhny Novgorod)
4	DF	RUS	Yuri Gorshkov (to Krylia Sovetov Samara)
6	DF	SLO	Vanja Drkušić (on loan to (Spain) Espanyol)
9	FW	COL	Jhon Durán (end of loan from (Saudi Arabia) Al-Nassr)
17	MF	RUS	Andrei Mostovoy (on loan to Lokomotiv Moscow)
18	MF	RUS	Yaroslav Mikhaylov (to Rostov)
23	DF	RUS	Arsen Adamov (to Akhmat Grozny)
41	GK	RUS	Mikhail Kerzhakov (retired)
—	GK	RUS	Aleksandr Dyogtev (on loan to Orenburg, previously from Sochi)
—	DF	RUS	Matvey Bardachyov (on loan to Fakel Voronezh, previously on loan to Ural Yekaterinburg)
—	DF	SRB	Strahinja Eraković (on loan to (Turkey) Samsunspor, previously on loan to (Serbia) Red Star Belgrade)
—	DF	RUS	Ilya Kirsh (to Baltika Kaliningrad, previously on loan to Pari Nizhny Novgorod)
—	MF	BRA	Du Queiroz (on loan to (Azerbaijan) Sabah, previously on loan to Orenburg)
—	MF	RUS	Ilzat Akhmetov (to Krylia Sovetov Samara, previously on loan)
—	MF	RUS	Dmitri Vasilyev (to Orenburg, previously on loan to Sochi)
—	FW	RUS	Andrey Kasadzhikov (on loan to Orenburg, previously at Zenit-2 St. Petersburg)
