= 2023–24 FC Zenit Saint Petersburg season =

Zenit Saint Petersburg
2023–24 season
- President: Alexander Medvedev
- Head coach: Sergei Semak
- Stadium: Krestovsky Stadium
- Russian Premier League: 1st
- Russian Cup: Winners
- Russian Super Cup: Winners
- Top goalscorer: League: Mateo Cassierra (16); All: Mateo Cassierra (18)
- Highest home attendance: 57,858 vs Spartak Moscow, 2 March 2024, Russian Premier League
- Lowest home attendance: 13,037 vs Rubin Kazan, 24 April 2024, Russian Premier League
- Average home league attendance: 35,447
- Biggest win: 4–0 vs Ural (H), 26 August 2023, Russian Premier League; 4–1 vs Ural (A), 9 March 2024, Russian Premier League
- Biggest defeat: 1–3 vs Orenburg (H), 30 September 2023, Russian Premier League
| colours | Away colours | Champions colours |

The 2023–24 season was FC Zenit Saint Petersburg's 99th season in existence and 28th consecutive in the Russian Premier League. They also competed in the Russian Cup and the Russian Super Cup.

== Management ==
| Position | Name |
|---|---|
| Manager | (Russia) Sergey Semak |
| Assistant managers | (Brazil) William Artur de Oliveira (Russia) Igor Simutenkov (Ukraine) Anatoliy Tymoshchuk (Russia) Aleksandr Anyukov |
| Goalkeeping coach | (Russia) Mikhail Biryukov (Belarus) Yuri Zhevnov |
| Fitness coach | (Italy) Ivan Carminati (Italy) Andrea Scanavino |
| Doctor | (Russia) Mikhail Grishin |

Source: http://fc-zenit.ru/zenit/coaches/

== Players ==
=== First-team squad ===
As of match played 24 April 2024

| No. | Name | Nationality | Position | Date of birth (age) | Signed in | Contract ends | Signed from | Transfer fee | Apps. | Goals |
Goalkeepers
| 1 | Aleksandr Vasyutin | (Russia) | GK | 4 March 1995 (age 31) | 2019 | 2024 | (Norway) Sarpsborg | €700k | 6 | 0 |
| 16 | Denis Adamov | (Russia) | GK | 20 February 1998 (age 28) | 2023 | 2027 | (Russia) Sochi | €1M | 7 | 0 |
| 41 | Mikhail Kerzhakov | (Russia) | GK | 28 January 1987 (age 39) | 2015 | 2024 | (Russia) Orenburg | Free | 98 | 0 |
Defenders
| 2 | Dmitri Chistyakov | (Russia) | CB | 13 January 1994 (age 32) | 2021 | 2025 | (Russia) Rostov | €3.25m | 47 | 1 |
| 3 | Douglas Santos | (Brazil) | LB | 22 March 1994 (age 32) | 2019 | 2026 | (Germany) Hamburger SV | €14m | 133 | 5 |
| 4 | Danil Krugovoy | (Russia) | LB | 28 May 1998 (age 28) | 2019 | 2024 | (Russia) Ufa | €2m | 76 | 2 |
| 6 | Mário Fernandes | (Russia) | LB | 19 September 1990 (age 36) | 2023 | 2024 | (Brazil) Internacional | €365k | 12 | 0 |
| 15 | Vyacheslav Karavayev | (Russia) | RB | 20 May 1995 (age 31) | 2019 | 2026 | (Netherlands) Vitesse | €8m | 104 | 4 |
| 25 | Strahinja Eraković | (Serbia) | CB | 22 January 2001 (age 25) | 2023 | 2027 | (Serbia) Red Star Belgrade | €8M | 22 | 0 |
| 27 | Nino | (Brazil) | CB | 10 April 1997 (age 29) | 2024 | 2028 | (Brazil) Fluminense | €5M | 7 | 0 |
| 28 | Nuraly Alip | (Kazakhstan) | CB | 22 December 1999 (age 26) | 2023 | 2025 | (Kazakhstan) Kairat Almaty | €2m | 25 | 0 |
| 55 | Rodrigão | (Brazil) | CB | 11 September 1995 (age 31) | 2022 | 2025 | (Russia) Sochi | €2m | 36 | 2 |
| 77 | Robert Renan | (Brazil) | CB | 11 October 2003 (age 23) | 2023 | 2028 | (Brazil) Corinthians | Free | 13 | 0 |
Midfielders
| 5 | Wilmar Barrios | (Colombia) | DM | 16 October 1993 (age 33) | 2019 | 2026 | (Argentina) Boca Juniors | €15M | 141 | 3 |
| 8 | Wendel | (Brazil) | CM | 28 August 1997 (age 29) | 2020 | 2027 | (Portugal) Sporting CP | €20.3m | 87 | 17 |
| 11 | Claudinho | (Brazil) | AM | 28 January 1997 (age 29) | 2021 | 2027 | (Brazil) RB Bragantino | €12m | 72 | 17 |
| 18 | Aleksandr Kovalenko | (Russia) | CM | 8 August 2003 (age 23) | 2023 | 2028 | (Russia) Sochi | €2M | 4 | 0 |
| 21 | Aleksandr Yerokhin | (Russia) | AM | 13 October 1989 (age 37) | 2017 | 2024 | (Russia) Rostov | €5M | 154 | 31 |
| 35 | Vladislav Saus | (Russia) | AM | 6 August 2003 (age 23) | 2022 | 2024 | Academy | – | 1 | 0 |
| 37 | Du Queiroz | (Brazil) | DM | 7 January 2000 (age 26) | 2023 | 2028 | (Brazil) Corinthians | Free | 10 | 0 |
| 77 | Ilzat Akhmetov | (Russia) | AM | 31 December 1997 (age 28) | 2024 | 2026 | (Russia) Krasnodar | €850k | 2 | 0 |
| 79 | Dmitri Vasilyev | (Russia) | DM | 16 June 2004 (age 22) | 2022 | 2024 | Academy | – | 6 | 0 |
| 94 | Danila Kozlov (U19) | (Russia) | AM | 19 January 2005 (age 21) | 2023 | 2026 | Academy | – | 2 | 0 |
Forwards
| 7 | Zelimkhan Bakayev | (Russia) | RW | 1 July 1996 (age 30) | 2022 | 2025 | (Russia) Spartak Moscow | Free | 21 | 1 |
| 9 | Artur | (Brazil) | RW | 15 February 1998 (age 28) | 2024 | 2027 | (Brazil) Palmeiras | €15M | 7 | 2 |
| 10 | Wilson Isidor | (France) | ST | 27 August 2000 (age 26) | 2023 | 2024 | (Russia) Lokomotiv Moscow | Loan | 12 | 1 |
| 17 | Andrei Mostovoy | (Russia) | LW | 5 November 1997 (age 29) | 2019 | 2024 | Academy | – | 101 | 22 |
| 19 | Aleksei Sutormin | (Russia) | RW | 10 January 1994 (age 32) | 2019 | 2025 | (Russia) Rubin Kazan | €3M | 95 | 10 |
| 24 | Pedro | (Brazil) | LW | 5 February 2006 (age 20) | 2024 | 2028 | (Brazil) Corinthians | €9M | 7 | 1 |
| 30 | Mateo Cassierra | (Colombia) | ST | 13 April 1997 (age 29) | 2022 | 2025 | (Russia) Sochi | €4.5M | 48 | 18 |
| 31 | Gustavo Mantuan | (Brazil) | LW | 20 June 2001 (age 25) | 2023 | 2027 | (Brazil) Corinthians | €2M | 22 | 2 |
| 33 | Ivan Sergeyev | (Russia) | ST | 11 May 1995 (age 31) | 2022 | 2025 | (Russia) Krylia Sovetov Samara | €2.15M | 59 | 20 |
| 96 | Aleksey Baranovsky (U19) | (Russia) | ST | 25 January 2005 (age 21) | 2023 | 2026 | Academy | – | 3 | 0 |

== Transfers ==
=== In ===
==== Summer ====
| Date | Pos | Player | From | Fee | Ref. |
|---|---|---|---|---|---|
| 1 July 2023 | CM | (Russia) Aleksandr Kovalenko | (Russia) Sochi | €2,000,000 | |
| 1 July 2023 | DM | (Brazil) Du Queiroz | (Brazil) Corinthians | Free transfer | |
| 1 July 2023 | LW | (Brazil) Gustavo Mantuan | (Brazil) Corinthians | €2,000,000 | |
| 1 July 2023 | GK | (Russia) Nikita Goylo | (Russia) Nizhny Novgorod | €540,000 | |
| 17 July 2023 | LB | (Russia) Mário Fernandes | (Brazil) Internacional | €365,000 | — |
| 23 July 2023 | CB | (Serbia) Strahinja Eraković | (Serbia) Red Star Belgrade | €8,000,000 | – |
| 25 July 2023 | GK | (Russia) Denis Adamov | (Russia) Sochi | €1,000,000 | |
| 10 September 2023 | ST | (France) Wilson Isidor | (Russia) Lokomotiv Moscow | Loan | |

==== Winter ====
| Date | Pos | Player | From | Fee | Ref. |
|---|---|---|---|---|---|
| 4 January 2024 | CB | (Brazil) Nino | (Brazil) Fluminense | €5,000,000 | – |
| 5 February 2024 | LW | (Brazil) Pedro | (Brazil) Corinthians | €9,000,000 | |

=== Out ===
==== Summer ====
| Date | Pos. | Player | To | Fee | Ref. |
|---|---|---|---|---|---|
| 10 July 2023 | AM | (Russia) Daniil Shamkin | (Russia) Torpedo Moscow | €200,000 | |
| 12 July 2023 | CM | (Russia) Daler Kuzyaev | (France) Le Havre | Free transfer | |
| 26 July 2023 | RW | (Brazil) Malcom | (Saudi Arabia) Al Hilal | €60,000,000 | |

=== Loans out ===
==== Summer ====
| Date | Pos. | Player | To | Until | Ref. |
|---|---|---|---|---|---|
| 25 July 2023 | GK | (Russia) Nikita Goylo | (Russia) Sochi | 30 June 2024 | |
| 1 August 2023 | LB | (Russia) Arsen Adamov | (Russia) Orenburg | 30 June 2024 | |

==== Winter ====
| Date | Pos. | Player | To | Until | Ref. |
|---|---|---|---|---|---|
| 11 January 2024 | CB | (Brazil) Robert Renan | (Brazil) Internacional | 30 June 2024 | – |
| 14 January 2024 | CB | (Russia) Dmitri Chistyakov | (Russia) Sochi | 30 June 2024 | |

== New contracts ==
| Position | Player | Until | Ref. |
|---|---|---|---|
| GK | (Russia) Mikhail Kerzhakov | June 2024 | |
| GK | (Russia) Daniil Odoyevsky | June 2027 | |

== Pre-season and friendlies ==
| 1 July 2023 PARI Premier Cup | Zenit Saint Petersburg (Russia) | 3–1 | (Azerbaijan) Neftchi Baku | Saint Petersburg |
| 19:30 | Mantuan 47'; Claudinho 69'; Bakaev 79' | | Saldanha 38' (pen.) | Stadium: Krestovsky Stadium |

| 4 July 2023 PARI Premier Cup | Red Star Belgrade (Serbia) | 2–1 | (Russia) Zenit Saint Petersburg | Saint Petersburg |
| 19:30 | Ivanić 40'; Krasso 88' (pen.) | | Queiroz 62' | Stadium: Krestovsky Stadium; Referee: Aleksey Amelin |

| 9 July 2023 PARI Premier Cup | Zenit Saint Petersburg (Russia) | 0–0 (4–3 p) | (Turkey) Fenerbahçe | Saint Petersburg |
| 19:30 | | | | Stadium: Krestovsky Stadium; Attendance: 35,421; Referee: Sergey Ivanov |
| | Penalties |
| | Malcom (penalty scored); Adamov (penalty scored); Mostovoy (penalty scored); Sutormin (penalty scored); Bakaev (penalty missed) | | (penalty scored) Yüksek; (penalty scored) Osayi-Samuel; (penalty scored) João Pedro; (penalty missed) Rossi; (penalty missed) Kahveci |

| 10 July 2023 Friendly | Zenit Saint Petersburg (Russia) | 4–0 | (Russia) Dynamo Saint Petersburg | Saint Petersburg |
| 17:00 | Yerokhin 56', 58', 80'; Mostovoy 79' | | | Stadium: Krestovsky Stadium |

| 7 September 2023 Friendly | Zenit Saint Petersburg (Russia) | 4–1 | (Iran) Sepahan | Saint Petersburg |
| 20:00 MSK (UTC+3) | Sergeev 19'; Bakaev 22'; Erokhin 29' (pen.); Wendel (yellow card) 52'; Mantuan 90+2' | Report | Mohammadi (yellow card) 27'; Ahmadi (yellow card) 37'; Ahmadzadeh (yellow card) 87'; Alekasir 90' | Stadium: Gazprom Arena; Attendance: 16,331; Referee: Andrey Vereteshkin |

| 14 October 2023 Friendly | Kairat Almaty (Kazakhstan) | 2–2 | (Russia) Zenit Saint Petersburg | Almaty |
| 17:00 ALMT (UTC+6) | Paulo 8' (yellow card) 77'; Shvyryov (yellow card) 38'; Arad 69'; Krachkovskiy (yellow card) 81' | Report | Erokhin 29'; Mantuan 85' | Stadium: Almaty Central Stadium |

| 19 November 2023 Friendly | Neftçi (Azerbaijan) | 2–1 | (Russia) Zenit Saint Petersburg | Baku |
| 21:00 AZT (UTC+4) | Mirzov 9', 62' | Report | Queiroz 56' | Stadium: Neftçi Arena |

| 21 January 2024 Friendly | Zenit Saint Petersburg (Russia) | 5–1 | (Uzbekistan) Dinamo Samarqand | Abu Dhabi |
| 16:00 GST (UTC+4) | Fernandes 13'; Wendel 26'; Mostovoy 30'; Vasiljev 53'; Pedro 78' | Report | Khozhimirzaev 37' | Stadium: Zayed Sports City Stadium; Attendance: 43,206 |

| 24 January 2024 Friendly | Zenit Saint Petersburg (Russia) | 5–1 | (South Korea) Jeonbuk Hyundai Motors | Abu Dhabi |
| 18:00 GST (UTC+4) | Cassierra 22'; Barrios (yellow card) 32'; Pedro 58'; Sergeev 66'; Mantuan 70'; Bardachyov 74' | Report | Seung-ho 26' | Stadium: Zayed Sports City Stadium; Attendance: 43,206 |

| 27 January 2024 Friendly | Zenit Saint Petersburg (Russia) | 1–0 | (Russia) Ural | Abu Dhabi |
| 18:00 GST (UTC+4) | Cassierra 88' | Report | | Stadium: Zayed Sports City Stadium; Attendance: 43,206 |

| 28 January 2024 Friendly | Zenit Saint Petersburg (Russia) | 1–1 | (Saudi Arabia) Al Fateh | Abu Dhabi |
| 15:00 GST (UTC+4) | Claudinho 4' | Report | Tello 14' | Stadium: Zayed Sports City Stadium; Attendance: 43,206 |

| 5 February 2024 Equality Cup | Zenit Saint Petersburg (Russia) | 2–0 | (Qatar) Al-Duhail | Doha |
| 16:00 AST (UTC+3) | Claudinho 8', (yellow card) 57'; Artur 72' | Report | Al-Sibai (yellow card) 29'; Gannan (yellow card) 48' | Stadium: Jassim bin Hamad Stadium |

| 6 February 2024 Friendly | Zenit Saint Petersburg (Russia) | 0–0 | (Armenia) Noah | Saint Petersburg |
| 17:00 MSK (UTC+4) | Bardachyov (yellow card) 45'; Karavaev (yellow card) 73' | Report | | Stadium: Krestovsky Stadium |

| 8 February 2024 Equality Cup | Zenit Saint Petersburg (Russia) | 6–0 | (China) Shanghai Shenhua | Doha |
| 16:00 AST (UTC+3) | Pedro 2'; Cassierra 43', 46', 61'; Santos 54'; Mantuan 82'; Eraković (yellow card) 89' | Report | Yangyang (yellow card) 40'; Amadou (yellow card) 59'; Yunding (yellow card) 89'; Malele (yellow card) 89' | Stadium: Jassim bin Hamad Stadium |

| 9 February 2024 Friendly | Zenit Saint Petersburg (Russia) | 2–4 | (Qatar) Al-Rayyan | Doha |
| 17:00 AST (UTC+3) | Kovalenko 58'; Sergeev 74' | Report | Sutormin 48' (o.g.); Mendes 54' (pen.); Amaro 72'; Al-Abdullah 84' | Stadium: Ahmed bin Ali Stadium |

| 13 February 2024 Equality Cup | Zenit Saint Petersburg (Russia) | 4–1 | (Brazil) Santos | Doha |
| 17:00 AST (UTC+3) | Karavaev 10'; Mostovoy 31'; Claudinho 55'; Pedro 84' | Report | Rodrigo 77' | Stadium: Jassim bin Hamad Stadium |

== Competitions ==
=== Overall record ===
| Competition | First match | Last match | Starting round | Final position | Record | | | | | | | |
| Competition | First match | Last match | Starting round | Final position | Pld | W | D | L | GF | GA | GD | Win % |
|---|---|---|---|---|---|---|---|---|---|---|---|---|
| Russian Premier League | 22 July 2023 | 25 May 2024 | Matchday 1 | 1st | 30 | 17 | 6 | 7 | 52 | 27 | +25 | 56.67 |
| Russian Cup | 25 July 2023 | 2 June 2024 | Group stage | Winners | 13 | 7 | 4 | 2 | 12 | 9 | +3 | 53.85 |
| Russian Super Cup | 15 July 2023 | | Final | Winners | 1 | 1 | 0 | 0 | 0 | 0 | +0 | 100.00 |
| Total | | | | | 44 | 25 | 10 | 9 | 64 | 36 | +28 | 56.82 |

Last updated: 2 June 2024
Source: Soccerway

=== Super Cup ===
| 15 July 2023 Final | Zenit Saint Petersburg | 0–0 (5–4 p) | CSKA Moscow | Kazan |
| 17:00 MSK (UTC+3) | Claudinho (yellow card) 45+3' | | Gajić (yellow card) 45+3' | Stadium: Kazan Arena; Attendance: 42,873; Referee: Sergei Karasev |
| | Penalties |
| | Malcom (penalty scored); Sutormin (penalty scored); Mostovoy (penalty scored); Bakaev (penalty scored); Sergeev (penalty missed); Renan (penalty scored) | | Chalov (penalty scored); Gaich (penalty scored); Nababkin (penalty scored); Zabolotny (penalty scored); Gajić (penalty missed); Ermakov (penalty missed) |

=== Russian Premier League ===
==== League table ====
| Pos | Team | Pld | W | D | L | GF | GA | GD | Pts |
|---|---|---|---|---|---|---|---|---|---|
| 1 | Zenit Saint Petersburg (C) | 30 | 17 | 6 | 7 | 52 | 27 | +25 | 57 |
| 2 | Krasnodar | 30 | 16 | 8 | 6 | 45 | 29 | +16 | 56 (Note: Krasnodar is ahead of Dynamo on head-to-head points: Krasnodar 6, Dynamo 0) |
| 3 | Dynamo Moscow | 30 | 16 | 8 | 6 | 53 | 39 | +14 | 56 |
| 4 | Lokomotiv Moscow | 30 | 14 | 11 | 5 | 52 | 38 | +14 | 53 |
| 5 | Spartak Moscow | 30 | 14 | 8 | 8 | 41 | 32 | +9 | 50 |

Source: Premier Liga
Rules for classification: 1) Points; 2) Head-to-head points; 3) Head-to-head matches won; 4) Head-to-head goal difference; 5) Head-to-head goals scored; 6) Matches won; 7) Goal difference; 8) Goals scored; 9) 2022–23 position (not applicable to final standings); 10) Play-off. Note: if teams tied on points played an equal number of head-to-head games, head-to-head results are considered in aggregate, in a separate 'table'. If teams tied on points played a different number of head-to-head games, head-to-head criteria are considered in one-on-one pairs for each team against each other, then the teams are ordered by the number of one-on-one matchups they have advantage in.
(C) Champions

==== Results summary ====
| Overall | | | | | | | | Home | | | | | | Away | | | | | |
| Pld | W | D | L | GF | GA | GD | Pts | W | D | L | GF | GA | GD | W | D | L | GF | GA | GD |
|---|---|---|---|---|---|---|---|---|---|---|---|---|---|---|---|---|---|---|---|
| 30 | 17 | 6 | 7 | 52 | 27 | +25 | 57 | 9 | 2 | 4 | 23 | 12 | +11 | 8 | 4 | 3 | 29 | 15 | +14 |

Last updated: 25 May 2024.

==== Results by round ====
| Round | 1 | 2 | 3 | 4 | 5 | 6 | 7 | 8 | 9 | 10 | 11 | 12 | 13 | 14 | 15 | 16 | 17 | 18 | 19 | 20 | 21 | 22 | 23 | 24 | 25 | 26 | 27 | 28 | 29 | 30 |
|---|---|---|---|---|---|---|---|---|---|---|---|---|---|---|---|---|---|---|---|---|---|---|---|---|---|---|---|---|---|---|
| Ground | A | A | H | H | A | H | A | A | H | A | A | H | H | A | H | H | A | H | H | A | A | H | A | H | H | A | A | H | A | H |
| Result | W | D | L | W | W | W | D | W | L | L | W | W | W | W | D | W | L | W | D | W | D | W | W | W | L | L | D | L | W | W |
| Position | 2 | 4 | 6 | 8 | 4 | 2 | 4 | 2 | 3 | 4 | 3 | 2 | 2 | 2 | 2 | 2 | 2 | 2 | 2 | 1 | 1 | 1 | 1 | 1 | 1 | 1 | 1 | 2 | 1 | 1 |

Updated to match(es) played on 25 May 2024. Source:
A = Away; H = Home; W = Win; D = Draw; L = Loss

==== Matches ====
The league fixtures were unveiled on 24 June 2023.

| 22 July 2023 1 | Nizhny Novgorod | 0–2 | Zenit Saint Petersburg | Nizhny Novgorod |
| 15:15 MSK (UTC+3) | Kalinsky (yellow card) 27'; Aleksandrov (red card) 48'; Sevikyan (yellow card) 53' | Report | Cassierra 57', 83'; Bakaev (yellow card) 75' | Stadium: Nizhny Novgorod Stadium; Attendance: 12,036; Referee: Sergey Ivanov |

| 29 July 2023 2 | Rostov | 1–1 | Zenit Saint Petersburg | Rostov-on-Don |
| 20:00 MSK (UTC+3) | Bayramyan (yellow card) 50'; Akbashev (yellow card) 68'; Terentjev (yellow card) 88'; Mironov (yellow card) 90+2'; Komlichenko 90+3' (pen.) | Report | Cassierra 43'; Mantuan (yellow card) 50' | Stadium: Rostov Arena; Attendance: 16,413; Referee: Yevgeni Kukulyak |

| 6 August 2023 3 | Zenit Saint Petersburg | 2–3 | Dynamo Moscow | Saint Petersburg |
| 15:00 MSK (UTC+3) | Balbuena 10' (o.g.); Eraković (yellow card) 79'; Sergeev 90'; Barrios (red card) 90+4' | Report | Tyukavin 2', 33'; Makarov (yellow card) 41'; Grulev 90+6'; Smolov (yellow card) 90+7' | Stadium: Krestovsky Stadium; Attendance: 24,672; Referee: Aleksey Amelin |

| 13 August 2023 4 | Zenit Saint Petersburg | 2–0 | Fakel Voronezh | Saint Petersburg |
| 16:30 MSK (UTC+3) | Sergeev 16'; Santos (yellow card) 38'; Karavaev (yellow card) 62'; Alip (yellow card) 86'; Eraković (yellow card) 90+6'; Mantuan 90+8' | Report | Bozhin (yellow card) 62'; Appaev (yellow card) 86'; Kvekveskiri (yellow card) 90+7' | Stadium: Krestovsky Stadium; Attendance: 19,588; Referee: Pavel Shadykhanov |

| 20 August 2023 5 | Spartak Moscow | 1–3 | Zenit Saint Petersburg | Moscow |
| 19:30 MSK (UTC+3) | Ignatov (yellow card) 10'; Sobolev 81' (pen.) | Report | Wendel 32', 73'; Cassierra 90+4', (yellow card) 90+6' | Stadium: Otkritie Arena; Attendance: 33,852; Referee: Sergey Karasev |

| 26 August 2023 6 | Zenit Saint Petersburg | 4–0 | Ural Yekaterinburg | Saint Petersburg |
| 15:00 MSK (UTC+3) | Sergeev 8'; Alip (yellow card) 21'; Cassierra 30', 68'; Claudinho 45+1' | Report | Cissé (yellow card) 20'; Ishkov (yellow card) 50' | Stadium: Krestovsky Stadium; Attendance: 25,723; Referee: Artem Chistyakov |

| 3 September 2023 7 | CSKA Moscow | 1–1 | Zenit Saint Petersburg | Moscow |
| 17:30 MSK (UTC+3) | Zabolotnyi 4', (yellow card) 90+6'; Willyan (yellow card) 90+5'; Méndez (yellow card) 90+6' | Report | Santos 88', (yellow card) 90+5'; Alip (yellow card) 90+5'; Claudinho (yellow card) 90+6' | Stadium: VEB Arena; Attendance: 20,497; Referee: Pavel Kukuyan |

| 17 September 2023 8 | Rubin Kazan | 0–3 | Zenit Saint Petersburg | Kazan |
| 16:30 MSK (UTC+3) | Kabutov (yellow card) 18'; Zotov (yellow card) 62' | Report | Isidor 8'; Cassierra 55'; Claudinho 59'; Wendel (yellow card) 67'; Sutormin (yellow card) 89' | Stadium: Kazan Arena; Attendance: 10,429; Referee: Rafael Shafeev |

| 24 September 2023 9 | Zenit Saint Petersburg | 1–2 | Lokomotiv Moscow | Saint Petersburg |
| 16:30 MSK (UTC+3) | Cassierra 22', (yellow card) 29'; Rodrigão (yellow card) 88'; Sergeev (yellow card) 90+7'; Wendel (yellow card) 90+7' | Report | Miranchuk (yellow card) 40'; Glushenkov 60' (yellow card) 90+5'; Tiknizyan 90+1' (yellow card) 90+3' (yellow-red card) 90+7' | Stadium: Gazprom Arena; Attendance: 36,283; Referee: Vladimir Moskalev |

| 30 September 2023 10 | Orenburg | 3–1 | Zenit Saint Petersburg | Orenburg |
| 14:00 YEKT (UTC+5) | Vorobyev 7'; Gojković (yellow card) 14'; Pérez 25'; Mansilla 36' (yellow card) 72'; Sidorov (yellow card) 50'; Cuero (yellow card) 81'; Bašić (yellow card) 90+2' | Report | Mantuan 2'; Isidor (yellow card) 82'; Rodrigão (yellow card) 90+1' | Stadium: Gazovik Stadium; Attendance: 5,842; Referee: Sergey Ivanov |

| 7 October 2023 11 | Sochi | 0–2 | Zenit Saint Petersburg | Sochi |
| 14:00 MSK (UTC+3) | Zaika (yellow card) 84' | Report | Claudinho 9' (pen.); Cassierra 30' | Stadium: Fisht Olympic Stadium; Attendance: 5,617; Referee: Vladislav Bezborodov |

| 22 October 2023 12 | Zenit Saint Petersburg | 3–1 | Krylia Sovetov Samara | Saint Petersburg |
| 16:30 MSK (UTC+3) | Wendel 53', 80'; Sergeev (yellow card) 58'; Mostovoy 90+6' | Report | Rasskazov (yellow card) 36'; Ezhov (yellow card) 75' (goal) 90+8' | Stadium: Krestovsky Stadium; Attendance: 24,402; Referee: Artem Chistyakov |

| 28 October 2023 13 | Zenit Saint Petersburg | 2–1 | Akhmat Grozny | Saint Petersburg |
| 19:00 MSK (UTC+3) | Sergeev 32'; Cassierra 37'; Alip (yellow card) 52'; Eraković (yellow card) 90+3' | Report | Konaté 24'; Timofeyev (yellow card) 36' | Stadium: Krestovsky Stadium; Attendance: 17,967; Referee: Sergey Karasev |

| 4 November 2023 14 | Baltika | 0–2 | Zenit Saint Petersburg | Kaliningrad |
| 18:00 EET (UTC+2) | | Report | Sergeev 63'; Cassierra 77' | Stadium: Kaliningrad Stadium; Attendance: 16,929; Referee: Aleksey Sukhoy |

| 11 November 2023 15 | Zenit Saint Petersburg | 1–1 | Krasnodar | Saint Petersburg |
| 19:30 MSK (UTC+3) | Cassierra 70' | Report | Spertsyan 63'; Olaza (yellow card) 66' | Stadium: Krestovsky Stadium; Attendance: 46,695; Referee: Sergey Karasev |

| 25 November 2023 16 | Zenit Saint Petersburg | 3–0 | Sochi | Saint Petersburg |
| 15:15 MSK (UTC+3) | Rodrigão 45+2'; Claudinho 53'; Isidor 59'; Mostovoy 89' | Report | Ignatjev (yellow card) 3' | Stadium: Krestovsky Stadium; Attendance: 21,964; Referee: Kirill Levnikov |

| 3 December 2023 17 | Lokomotiv Moscow | 3–1 | Zenit Saint Petersburg | Moscow |
| 17:00 MSK (UTC+3) | Glushenkov 8', 60'; Pinyaev (yellow card) 63'; Nenakhov (yellow card) 71'; Maradishvili (yellow card) 83'; Tiknizyan 88' | Report | Cassierra 41'; Eraković (yellow card) 90+1' | Stadium: RZD Arena; Attendance: 10,060; Referee: Aleksey Sukhoy |

| 9 December 2023 18 | Zenit Saint Petersburg | 1–0 | Nizhny Novgorod | Saint Petersburg |
| 19:45 MSK (UTC+3) | Cassierra 15' | Report | | Stadium: Gazprom Arena; Attendance: 24,951; Referee: Sergey Ivanov |

| 2 March 2024 19 | Zenit Saint Petersburg | 0–0 | Spartak Moscow | Saint Petersburg |
| 16:00 MSK (UTC+3) | Eraković (yellow card) 59'; Douglas Santos (yellow card) 77'; Barrios (yellow card) 88'; Wendel (yellow card) 90' | Report | Duarte (yellow card) 22'; Khlusevich (yellow card) 80'; Martins (yellow card) 82'; Prutsev (yellow card) 90' | Stadium: Gazprom Arena; Attendance: 57,858; Referee: Sergei Karasev |

| 9 March 2024 20 | Ural | 1–4 | Zenit Saint Petersburg | Yekaterinburg |
| 18:00 MSK (UTC+5) | Miškić (yellow card) 42'; Bicfalvi 90+3' | Report | Santos 38'; Mostovoy 57'; Cassierra 67'; Sergeev 81' | Stadium: Central Stadium; Attendance: 11,373; Referee: Pavel Kukuyan |

| 30 March 2024 21 | Krylya Sovetov Samara | 1–1 | Zenit Saint Petersburg | Samara |
| 15:00 SMT (UTC+4) | Shitov 1'; Rahmanović (yellow card) 59'; Vityugov (yellow card) 67' | Report | Artur 23'; Nino (yellow card) 82' | Stadium: Metallurg Stadium; Attendance: 8,904; Referee: Rafael Shafeev |

| 7 April 2024 22 | Zenit Saint Petersburg | 1–0 | Baltika | Saint Petersburg |
| 16:30 MSK (UTC+3) | Pedro 42'; Wendel (yellow card) 45+1' | Report | | Stadium: Krestovsky Stadium; Attendance: 21,798; Referee: Aleksei Sukhoy |

| 13 April 2024 23 | Krasnodar | 1–2 | Zenit Saint Petersburg | Krasnodar |
| 17:00 MSK (UTC+3) | Olaza 16'; Tormena (yellow card) 90' (yellow-red card); Spertsyan (yellow card) 61'; Alonso (yellow card) 68'; Chernikov (yellow card) 87' | Report | Cassierra 48'; Artur 63'; Eraković (yellow card) 72'; Santos (yellow card) 80' | Stadium: Krasnodar Stadium; Attendance: 35,250; Referee: Sergey Ivanov |

| 21 April 2024 24 | Zenit Saint Petersburg | 1–0 | Orenburg | Saint Petersburg |
| 16:15 MSK (UTC+3) | Claudinho 23'; Nino (yellow card) 82' | Report | Pérez (yellow card) 45'; Goglichidze (yellow card) 55'; Sidorov (yellow card) 66'; Prokhin (yellow card) 70' | Stadium: Krestovsky Stadium; Attendance: 17,992; Referee: Vladislav Bezborodov |

| 24 April 2024 25 | Zenit Saint Petersburg | 0–2 | Rubin Kazan | Saint Petersburg |
| 20:30 MSK (UTC+3) | Eraković (yellow card) 70' | Report | Daku 50'; Martynovich 67'; Dyupin (yellow card) 90+6'; Rybus (yellow card) 90+7'; Gritsayenko (yellow card) 90+8' | Stadium: Krestovsky Stadium; Attendance: 13,037; Referee: Artem Chistyakov |

| 28 April 2024 26 | Dynamo Moscow | 1–0 | Zenit Saint Petersburg | Moscow |
| 19:15 MSK (UTC+3) | Tyukavin 77'; Smolov (yellow card) 90' | Report | | Stadium: VTB Arena; Attendance: 17,071; Referee: Pavel Kukuyan |

| 6 May 2024 27 | Fakel | 1–1 | Zenit Saint Petersburg | Voronezh |
| 18:00 MSK (UTC+3) | Appaev (yellow card) 81'; Markov 90+12' | Report | Santos 41'; Barrios (yellow card) 44'; Claudinho (yellow card) 90' | Stadium: Trade Unions Central Stadium; Attendance: 12,749; Referee: Aleksey Sukhoy |

| 11 May 2024 28 | Zenit Saint Petersburg | 0–1 | CSKA Moscow | Saint Petersburg |
| 19:00 MSK (UTC+3) | Santos (yellow card) 28'; Claudinho (yellow card) 84' | Report | Zabolotnyi (yellow card) 26'; Moisés (yellow card) 47'; Chalov 58'; Zdjelar (yellow card) 80'; Willyan (yellow card) 84'; Torop (yellow card) 90+3' | Stadium: Krestovsky Stadium; Attendance: 33,027; Referee: Sergey Ivanov |

| 19 May 2024 29 | Akhmat Grozny | 1–5 | Zenit Saint Petersburg | Grozny |
| 19:00 MSK (UTC+3) | Konaté 11'; Šatara (yellow card) 25'; Timofeev (yellow card) 77'; Oleynikov (yellow card) 87' | Report | Cassierra 4', 9', 44', 47', 51'; Kovalenko (yellow card) 84' | Stadium: Akhmat-Arena; Attendance: 5,843; Referee: Sergei Karasev |

| 25 May 2024 30 | Zenit Saint Petersburg | 2–1 | Rostov | Saint Petersburg |
| 16:30 MSK (UTC+3) | Karavaev (yellow card) 22'; Mantuan 65' (pen.); Artur 85', (yellow card) 85' | Report | Ronaldo 54'; Sako (yellow card) 61'; Komarov (yellow card) 68' | Stadium: Krestovsky Stadium; Attendance: 36,456; Referee: Vitali Meshkov |

=== Russian Cup ===
==== Group stage ====
| Pos | Team | Pld | W | PW | PL | L | GF | GA | GD | Pts | Qualification |
|---|---|---|---|---|---|---|---|---|---|---|---|
| 1 | Zenit Saint Petersburg | 6 | 4 | 1 | 0 | 1 | 9 | 5 | +4 | 14 | Qualification to the Knockout phase (RPL path) |
| 2 | Baltika Kaliningrad | 6 | 4 | 0 | 0 | 2 | 12 | 7 | +5 | 12 | Qualification to the Knockout phase (RPL path) |
| 3 | Akhmat Grozny | 6 | 2 | 0 | 1 | 3 | 10 | 12 | −2 | 7 | Qualification to the Knockout phase (regions path) |
| 4 | Krylia Sovetov Samara | 6 | 1 | 0 | 0 | 5 | 5 | 12 | −7 | 3 | |

Source: Russian Football Union (in Russian), Soccerway
Rules for classification: 1) Points; 2) Head-to-head points; 3) Head-to-head matches won; 4) Head-to-head goal difference; 5) Head-to-head goals scored; 6) Matches won; 7) Goal difference; 8) Goals scored; 9) Penalty shoot-out goal difference; 10) Draw.

| 25 July 2023 Matchday 1 | Zenit Saint Petersburg | 2–0 | Akhmat Grozny | Saint Petersburg |
| 20:45 MSK (UTC+3) | Mantuan 39'; Queiroz (yellow card) 59'; Claudinho 80'; Vasilyev (yellow card) 89' | Report | Todorović (yellow card) 30' | Stadium: Krestovsky Stadium; Attendance: 29,644; Referee: Sergey Tsyganok |

| 9 August 2023 Matchday 2 | Krylia Sovetov Samara | 0–1 | Zenit Saint Petersburg | Samara |
| 18:30 MSK (UTC+3) | | Report | Sergeev 50'; Queiroz (yellow card) 90+6' | Stadium: Metallurg Stadium; Attendance: 18,617; Referee: Sergei Cheban |

| 30 August 2023 Matchday 3 | Baltika Kaliningrad | 1–0 | Zenit Saint Petersburg | Kaliningrad |
| 18:30 EET (UTC+2) | Henríquez 42'; Latyshonok (yellow card) 84'; Guzina (yellow card) 90+4' | Report | Wendel (yellow card) 90+3'; Claudinho (yellow card) 90+4' | Stadium: Kaliningrad Stadium; Attendance: 27,961; Referee: Sergey Tsyganok |

| 19 September 2023 Matchday 4 | Akhmat Grozny | 3–3 (3–4 p) | Zenit Saint Petersburg | Grozny |
| TBD MSK (UTC+3) | Kovachev 4'; Oleynikov 14'; Utsiev (yellow card) 51'; Bystrov (red card) 90+2' | | Sergeev 27', 33'; Cassierra 42'; Krugovoy (yellow card) 90+4' | Stadium: Akhmat-Arena; Attendance: 13,383; Referee: Roman Galimov |
| | Penalties |
| | Iljin (penalty missed); Todorović (penalty scored); Kharin (penalty scored); Júnior (penalty missed) | | Cassierra (penalty scored); Isidor (penalty scored); Queiroz (penalty missed); Renan (penalty scored); Claudinho (penalty scored) |

| 3 October 2023 Matchday 5 | Zenit Saint Petersburg | 2–1 | Baltika Kaliningrad | Saint Petersburg |
| 17:15 MSK (UTC+3) | Sergeev 18'; Queiroz 64' | Report | Bistrović 24'; Musaev (yellow card) 90+2' | Stadium: Gazprom Arena; Attendance: 13,700; Referee: Aleksey Sukhoy |

| 31 October 2023 Matchday 6 | Zenit Saint Petersburg | 1–0 | Krylia Sovetov Samara | Saint Petersburg |
| 19:30 MSK (UTC+3) | Renan (yellow card) 4'; Sergeev 87' | Report | | Stadium: Gazprom Arena; Attendance: 24,519; Referee: Pavel Kukuyan |

==== Knockout stage ====
| 28 November 2023 First Leg | Dynamo Moscow | 1–0 | Zenit St.Petersburg | Moscow |
| 18:15 MSK (UTC+3) | Carrascal (yellow card) 14' (yellow-red card) 69'; Parshivlyuk (yellow card) 39'; Balbuena (yellow card) 53'; Smolov 74'; Shunin (yellow card) 90+4' | Report | Santos (yellow card) 79' | Stadium: VTB Arena; Attendance: 17,831; Referee: Pavel Kukuyan |

| 13 March 2024 Second Leg | Zenit St.Petersburg | 2–0 (2–1 agg.) | Dynamo Moscow | Saint Petersburg |
| 20:15 MSK (UTC+3) | Cassierra 13', 21'; Fernandes (yellow card) 51'; Wendel (yellow card) 62'; Barrios (yellow card) 76' | Report | Laxalt (yellow card) 38'; Parshivlyuk (yellow card) 42' | Stadium: Gazprom Arena; Attendance: 45,407; Referee: Sergey Ivanov |

| 3 April 2024 RPL Semi-finals | Spartak Moscow | 1–2 | Zenit St. Petersburg | Moscow |
| 20:30 MSK (UTC+3) | Ugalde 12', (yellow card) 41'; Nail Umyarov (yellow card) 57'; Babić (yellow card) 59' | Report | Alip (yellow card) 41'; Pedro 55', 65', (yellow card) 67' | Stadium: Lukoil Arena; Attendance: 23,849; Referee: Sergei Karasev |

| 17 April 2024 RPL Semi-finals | Zenit St. Petersburg | 0–0 (2–1 agg.) | Spartak Moscow | Saint Petersburg |
| 16:00 MSK (UTC+3) | | Report | Ugalde (yellow card) 78'; Sobolev (yellow card) 90+1' | Stadium: Gazprom Arena; Attendance: 56,740; Referee: Aleksei Sukhoy |

| 2 May 2024 RPL Final | CSKA Moscow | 1–1 | Zenit St. Petersburg | Moscow |
| 19:15 MSK (UTC+3) | Zabolotnyi 53' | Report | Erokhin 84' | Stadium: VEB Arena; Attendance: 23,158; Referee: Sergei Karasev |

| 15 May 2024 RPL Final | Zenit St. Petersburg | 0–0 (1–1 agg.) (5–4 p) | CSKA Moscow | Saint Petersburg |
| 20:45 MSK (UTC+3) | Vasiljev (yellow card) 12'; Isidor (yellow card) 83' | Report | Diveev (yellow card) 83' | Stadium: Krestovsky Stadium; Attendance: 68,134; Referee: Pavel Kukuyan |
| | Penalties |
| | Cassierra (penalty scored); Isidor (penalty scored); Mostovoy (penalty scored); Alip (penalty scored); Claudinho (penalty scored) | | Dávila (penalty scored); Oblyakov (penalty scored); Zabolotny (penalty missed); Diveev (penalty scored); Musaev (penalty scored) |

| 2 June 2024 Final | Baltika | 1–2 | Zenit St. Petersburg | Moscow |
| 18:00 MSK (UTC+3) | Fernandes 41' | Report | Erokhin (yellow card) 68'; Claudinho (yellow card) 77'; Nino 81'; Alip 90+5' | Stadium: Luzhniki Stadium; Attendance: Sergei Karasev; Referee: 41,776 |

== Statistics ==
=== Goalscorers ===
| Rank | No. | Pos. | Player | Russian Premier League | Russian Cup | Russian Super Cup | Total |
|---|---|---|---|---|---|---|---|
| 1 | 31 | FW | Mateo Cassierra | 16 | 1 | 0 | 17 |
| 2 | 33 | FW | Ivan Sergeyev | 6 | 5 | 0 | 11 |
| 3 | 8 | FW | Wendel | 4 | 0 | 0 | 4 |
| 4 | 11 | MF | Claudinho | 4 | 1 | 0 | 5 |
| 5 | 17 | FW | Andrei Mostovoy | 3 | 0 | 0 | 3 |
| 5 | 3 | DF | Douglas Santos | 3 | 0 | 0 | 3 |
7
| 7 | 30 | FW | Gustavo Mantuan | 2 | 0 | 0 | 2 |
| 7 | 10 | FW | Wilson Isidor | 2 | 0 | 0 | 2 |
| 7 | 9 | FW | Artur | 2 | 0 | —N/a | 2 |
| 10 | 55 | DF | Rodrigão | 1 | 0 | 0 | 1 |
| 10 | 21 | MF | Yerokhin | 0 | 1 | 0 | 1 |
| Totals | | | | 43 | 8 | 0 | 51 |

Last updated: 6 May 2024.
Source: FBref.com

=== Clean sheets ===
| Rank | No | Pos | Nat | Name | Premier Liga | Russian Cup | Russian Super Cup | Total |
|---|---|---|---|---|---|---|---|---|
| 1 | 41 | GK | (Russia) | Mikhail Kerzhakov | 8 | 0 | 1 | 9 |
| 2 | 16 | GK | (Russia) | Denis Adamov | 2 | 3 | 0 | 5 |
| 3 | 1 | GK | (Russia) | Aleksandr Vasyutin | 0 | 2 | 0 | 2 |
| Total | | | | | 10 | 5 | 1 | 16 |

Last updated: 15 May 2024.
