= Omar Minatulayev =

Russian footballer (born 2006)

Personal information
- Full name: Omar Magomedzagirovich Minatulayev
- Date of birth: 4 January 2006 (age 20)
- Place of birth: Makhachkala, Russia
- Height: 1.80 m (5 ft 11 in)
- Position: Central midfielder

Team information
- Current team: Orenburg
- Number: 63

Youth career
- Anzhi Makhachkala
- 2023–2024: FShM Moscow
- 2024: Orenburg

Senior career*
Years	Team	Apps	(Gls)
2025–	Orenburg-2	33	(13)
2025–	Orenburg	2	(0)
- * Club domestic league appearances and goals as of 1 November 2026

Omar Magomedzagirovich Minatulayev (Russian: Омар Магомедзагирович Минатулаев; born 4 January 2006) is a Russian football player who plays as a central midfielder for Orenburg and their reserve team Orenburg-2.

== Career ==
Minatulayev started his youth development in the academies of Anzhi Makhachkala and FShM Moscow, before joining the youth system of Orenburg in April 2024. He made his senior debut for Orenburg-2 in the fourth-tier Second League in 2025.

Minatulayev played his first game for the senior squad of Orenburg on 30 September 2025 in a Russian Cup game against Akhmat Grozny. He made his Russian Premier League debut on 22 August 2026 in a game against Fakel Voronezh.

== Career statistics ==
As of 1 November 2026

Club	Season	League			Cup		Total	
Club	Season	Division	Apps	Goals	Apps	Goals	Apps	Goals
Orenburg-2	2025	Russian Second League B	20	9	—		20	9
Orenburg-2	2026	Russian Second League B	13	4	—		13	4
Orenburg-2	Total		33	13	0	0	33	13
Orenburg	2025–26	Russian Premier League	0	0	2	0	2	0
Orenburg	2026–27	Russian Premier League	2	0	2	0	4	0
Orenburg	Total		2	0	4	0	6	0
Career total			35	13	4	0	39	13

== Personal life ==
His twin brother Osman Minatulayev is also a footballer.
