= Stanislav Poroykov =

Russian footballer (born 2004)

Personal information
- Full name: Stanislav Alekseyevich Poroykov
- Date of birth: 24 April 2004 (age 22)
- Place of birth: Moscow, Russia
- Height: 1.80 m (5 ft 11 in)
- Position: Right back

Team information
- Current team: Orenburg
- Number: 2

Youth career
- –2017: CSKA Moscow
- 2018–2021: Lokomotiv Moscow
- 2022: Strogino Moscow
- 2022: Khimki

Senior career*
Years	Team	Apps	(Gls)
2023–2025	Khimki	3	(0)
2023–2024	→ Khimki-M	27	(2)
2024–2025	→ Tyumen (loan)	22	(0)
2025–	Orenburg	7	(0)
2025	→ Orenburg-2	1	(0)
- * Club domestic league appearances and goals as of 17 May 2026

Stanislav Alekseyevich Poroykov (Russian: Станислав Алексеевич Поройков; born 24 April 2004) is a Russian football player who plays as a right back for Orenburg.

== Career ==
On 5 July 2025, Poroykov signed with Russian Premier League club Orenburg.

He made his RPL debut for Orenburg on 17 August 2025 in a game against Akron Tolyatti.

== Career statistics ==
As of 5 August 2026

Club	Season	League			Cup		Total	
Club	Season	Division	Apps	Goals	Apps	Goals	Apps	Goals
Khimki-M	2022–23	Russian Second League	10	1	–		10	1
Khimki-M	2023	Russian Second League B	14	1	–		14	1
Khimki-M	2024	Russian Second League B	3	0	–		3	0
Khimki-M	Total		27	2	0	0	27	2
Khimki	2023–24	Russian First League	3	0	1	0	4	0
Tyumen (loan)	2024–25	Russian First League	22	0	4	2	26	2
Orenburg-2	2025	Russian Second League B	1	0	–		1	0
Orenburg	2025–26	Russian Premier League	7	0	7	2	14	2
Orenburg	2026–27	Russian Premier League	0	0	1	0	1	0
Orenburg	Total		7	0	8	2	15	2
Career total			60	2	13	4	73	6
