= Mikhail Pykhcheyev =

Russian footballer (born 2006)

Personal information
- Full name: Mikhail Denisovich Pykhcheyev
- Date of birth: 1 July 2006 (age 20)
- Place of birth: Sergiyev Posad, Russia
- Height: 1.83 m (6 ft 0 in)
- Position: Defensive midfielder

Team information
- Current team: Orenburg/ Orenburg-2
- Number: 80

Youth career
- –2016: DYuSSh Sergiyev Posad
- 2016–2024: Spartak Moscow

Senior career*
Years	Team	Apps	(Gls)
2025	Spartak-2 Moscow	0	(0)
2025	→ Kosmos Dolgoprudny (loan)	7	(1)
2025–	Orenburg-2	21	(0)
2026–	Orenburg	2	(0)
- * Club domestic league appearances and goals as of 8 November 2026

Mikhail Denisovich Pykhcheyev (Russian: Михаил Денисович Пыхчеев; born 1 July 2006) is a Russian football player who plays as a defensive midfielder for Orenburg and Orenburg-2.

== Career ==
Pykhcheyev was raised in the youth system of Spartak Moscow, but never appeared for the club on the senior level. In the summer of 2025, he joined Orenburg-2, the reserve team of Russian Premier League club Orenburg.

He made his debut for Orenburg's senior squad on 2 September 2026 in a Russian Cup game against Rubin Kazan. On 17 September 2026, Pykcheyev made his Russian Premier League debut for Orenburg against Krasnodar.

== Career statistics ==
As of 8 November 2026

Club	Season	League			Cup		Total	
Club	Season	Division	Apps	Goals	Apps	Goals	Apps	Goals
Kosmos Dolgoprudny (loan)	2025	Russian Second League B	7	1	—		7	1
Orenburg-2	2025	Russian Second League B	5	0	—		5	0
Orenburg-2	2026	Russian Second League B	16	0	—		16	0
Orenburg-2	Total		21	0	0	0	21	0
Orenburg	2026–27	Russian Premier League	2	0	3	0	5	0
Career total			30	1	3	0	33	1
