= Ivan Ivashchenko =

Russian footballer (born 2007)

Personal information
- Full name: Ivan Andreyevich Ivashchenko
- Date of birth: 31 October 2007 (age 19)
- Place of birth: Novotroitsk, Russia
- Height: 1.82 m (6 ft 0 in)
- Positions: Defensive midfielder; central midfielder

Team information
- Current team: Orenburg/Orenburg-2
- Number: 65

Youth career
- –2023: Nosta Novotroitsk
- 2024: Orenburg

Senior career*
Years	Team	Apps	(Gls)
2023	Nosta Novotroitsk	1	(0)
2025–	Orenburg-2	38	(2)
2025–	Orenburg	3	(0)
- * Club domestic league appearances and goals as of 1 November 2026

Ivan Andreyevich Ivashchenko (Russian: Иван Андреевич Иващенко; born 31 October 2007) is a Russian football player who plays as a defensive midfielder or central midfielder for Orenburg and Orenburg-2.

== Career ==
Ivashchenko was raised in the youth academy of Nosta Novotroitsk and moved to Orenburg in early 2024 at the age of 16.

He made his debut in the Russian Premier League for Orenburg on 25 April 2026 in a game against Rostov, he started and played the full game.

== Career statistics ==
As of 1 November 2026

Club	Season	League			Cup		Total	
Club	Season	Division	Apps	Goals	Apps	Goals	Apps	Goals
Nosta Novotroitsk	2023	Russian Second League B	1	0	1	0	2	0
Orenburg-2	2025	Russian Second League B	24	2	—		24	2
Orenburg-2	2026	Russian Second League B	14	0	—		14	0
Orenburg-2	Total		38	2	0	0	38	2
Orenburg	2025–26	Russian Premier League	2	0	0	0	2	0
Orenburg	2026–27	Russian Premier League	1	0	3	0	4	0
Orenburg	Total		3	0	3	0	6	0
Career total			42	2	4	0	46	2
