= Andrey Khodanovich =

Russian footballer (born 2004)

Personal information
- Full name: Andrey Aleksandrovich Khodanovich
- Date of birth: 8 September 2004 (age 22)
- Place of birth: Orenburg, Russia
- Height: 1.95 m (6 ft 5 in)
- Position: Goalkeeper

Team information
- Current team: Volga Ulyanovsk (on loan from Orenburg)
- Number: 95

Youth career
- –2022: Orenburg

Senior career*
Years	Team	Apps	(Gls)
2022–	Orenburg	1	(0)
2022–	→ Orenburg-2	30	(0)
2024–2025	→ Chayka Peschanokopskoye (loan)	6	(0)
2026–	→ Volga Ulyanovsk (loan)	0	(0)
- * Club domestic league appearances and goals as of 18 May 2026

Andrey Aleksandrovich Khodanovich (Russian: Андрей Александрович Ходанович; born 8 September 2004) is a Russian football player who plays as a goalkeeper for Volga Ulyanovsk on loan from Orenburg.

== Career ==
Khodanovich made his debut for Orenburg on 9 August 2023 in a Russian Cup game against Sochi. He made his Russian Premier League debut on 20 August 2023 in a game against Akhmat Grozny.

On 12 July 2024, Khodanovich joined Chayka Peschanokopskoye on a season-long loan.

== Career statistics ==
As of 2 September 2026

Club	Season	League			Cup		Total	
Club	Season	Division	Apps	Goals	Apps	Goals	Apps	Goals
Orenburg-2	2022–23	Russian Second League	10	0	–		10	0
Orenburg-2	2023	Russian Second League B	11	0	–		11	0
Orenburg-2	2024	Russian Second League B	6	0	–		6	0
Orenburg-2	Total		27	0	0	0	27	0
Orenburg	2022–23	Russian Premier League	0	0	0	0	0	0
Orenburg	2023–24	Russian Premier League	1	0	5	0	6	0
Orenburg	2025–26	Russian Premier League	0	0	2	0	2	0
Orenburg	2026–27	Russian Premier League	0	0	2	0	2	0
Total		1	0	9	0	10	0	
Chayka Peschanokopskoye (loan)	2024–25	Russian First League	6	0	3	0	9	0
Career total			34	0	12	0	46	0
