= Dmitri Aleksandrov =

Russian footballer (born 2006)

Personal information
- Full name: Dmitri Mikhaylovich Aleksandrov
- Date of birth: 31 July 2006 (age 20)
- Place of birth: Volokolamsk, Moscow Oblast, Russia
- Height: 1.95 m (6 ft 5 in)
- Position: Defensive midfielder

Team information
- Current team: Dynamo Makhachkala (on loan from Dynamo Moscow)
- Number: 30

Youth career
- –2023: Dynamo Moscow

Senior career*
Years	Team	Apps	(Gls)
2023–	Dynamo Moscow	9	(0)
2023–	→ Dynamo-2 Moscow	32	(6)
2026–	→ Dynamo Makhachkala (loan)	5	(0)

International career^{‡}
2021	Russia U-15	5	(2)
2021	Russia U-16	3	(0)
2024	Russia U-19	4	(0)
2025	Russia U-21	2	(0)
- * Club domestic league appearances and goals as of 25 October 2026 ‡ National team caps and goals as of 8 June 2025

Dmitri Mikhaylovich Aleksandrov (Russian: Дмитрий Михайлович Александров; born 31 July 2006) is a Russian football player who plays as a defensive midfielder for Dynamo Makhachkala on loan from Dynamo Moscow.

== Career ==
Aleksandrov made his debut for Dynamo Moscow on 18 September 2024 in a Russian Cup game against Dynamo Makhachkala. He made his Russian Premier League debut for Dynamo on 24 November 2024 against Fakel Voronezh.

On 27 August 2026, Aleksandrov was loaned by Dynamo Makhachkala.

== Career statistics ==
As of 29 October 2026

Club	Season	League			Cup		Total	
Club	Season	Division	Apps	Goals	Apps	Goals	Apps	Goals
Dynamo-2 Moscow	2023	Russian Second League Division B	4	0	–		4	0
Dynamo-2 Moscow	2024	Russian Second League Division B	18	5	–		18	5
Dynamo-2 Moscow	2024–25	Russian Second League Division A	5	1	–		5	1
Dynamo-2 Moscow	2025–26	Russian Second League Division A	1	0	–		1	0
Dynamo-2 Moscow	2026–27	Russian Second League Division A	4	0	–		4	0
Dynamo-2 Moscow	Total		32	6	0	0	32	6
Dynamo Moscow	2024–25	Russian Premier League	6	0	3	0	9	0
Dynamo Moscow	2025–26	Russian Premier League	3	0	4	0	7	0
Dynamo Moscow	Total		9	0	7	0	16	0
Dynamo Makhachkala (loan)	2026–27	Russian Premier League	5	0	3	0	8	0
Career total			46	6	10	0	56	6
