= Aleksey Kasadzhikov =

Russian footballer (born 2007)

Personal information
- Full name: Aleksey Sergeyevich Kasadzhikov
- Date of birth: 2 October 2007 (age 19)
- Place of birth: Saint Petersburg, Russia
- Height: 1.82 m (6 ft 0 in)
- Position: Centre-forward

Team information
- Current team: Akhmat Grozny
- Number: 97

Youth career
- Zenit St. Petersburg

Senior career*
Years	Team	Apps	(Gls)
2026–	Akhmat Grozny	3	(0)
- * Club domestic league appearances and goals as of 18 October 2026

Aleksey Sergeyevich Kasadzhikov (Russian: Алексей Сергеевич Касаджиков; born 2 October 2007) is a Russian football player who plays as a centre-forward for Akhmat Grozny.

== Career ==
Kasadzhikov was raised in the youth system of Zenit St. Petersburg and appeared for their youth teams up to the Under-19 squad

On 10 July 2026, Kasadzhikov signed a five-year contract with Russian Premier League club Akhmat Grozny.

He made his debut in the RPL for Akhmat on 15 August 2026 in a game against Krasnodar.

== Personal life ==
His twin brother Andrey Kasadzhikov is also a footballer. Andrey signed his Russian Premier League contract with Orenburg one day after Aleksey signed with Akhmat.

Some sources credit Aleksey with Russian Second League appearances for Zenit-2 St. Petersburg in 2025 and 2026. Official Russian Second League website credits all those appearances to Andrey, and none to Aleksey.

== Career statistics ==
As of 18 October 2026

Club	Season	League			Cup		Total	
Club	Season	Division	Apps	Goals	Apps	Goals	Apps	Goals
Akhmat Grozny	2026–27	Russian Premier League	3	0	1	0	4	0
Career total			3	0	1	0	4	0
