= FC Orenburg-2 =

Russian football club

Orenburg-2
- Full name: FC Orenburg-2
- Founded: 2001
- Ground: Gazovik Stadium
- Capacity: 10,046
- Chairman: Igor Degtyaryov
- Manager: Yevgeny Mikhaylov
- League: Russian Second League, Division B, Group 4
- 2026: 7th
- Website: fcorenburg.ru

FC Orenburg-2 (Russian: ФК «Оренбург-2») is a Russian football team based in Orenburg. It is the farm club for FC Orenburg. For 2017–18 season, it received the license for the third-tier Russian Professional Football League. The team previously played as FC Gazovik-2 Orenburg in the Russian Amateur Football League. Following parent club's return to the Russian Premier League, Orenburg-2 was dissolved as a standalone team in summer 2018. After Orenburg's relegation at the end of the 2019–20 Russian Premier League, Orenburg-2 was registered for PFL again for the 2020–21 season. The finished in the relegation zone in the 2023 Russian Second League Division B, but were licensed for the 2024 season.

== Current squad ==
As of 14 September 2026, according to the Second League website.

Note: Flags indicate national team as defined under FIFA eligibility rules; some limited exceptions apply. Players may hold more than one non-FIFA nationality.

No.	Pos.	Nation	Player
1	GK	RUS	Bogdan Ovsyannikov
2	DF	RUS	Stanislav Poroykov
9	FW	RUS	Maksim Savelyev
17	FW	RUS	Osman Minatulayev
31	MF	RUS	Vladislav Galkin
34	DF	RUS	Semyon Zverev
38	DF	RUS	Artyom Kasimov
45	DF	RUS	Vladislav Davydov
48	MF	RUS	Yegor Antsiperov
51	FW	RUS	Yegor Berketov
52	MF	RUS	Timofey Yefimov
54	DF	RUS	Nikolay Koserik
56	DF	RUS	Yevgeny Novikov
59	DF	RUS	Maksim Syshchenko
63	MF	RUS	Omar Minatulayev
64	GK	RUS	Yegor Postrigan
65	MF	RUS	Ivan Ivashchenko
66	DF	RUS	Leonid Ivanov
67	MF	RUS	Yaroslav Pitintsev
68	DF	RUS	Sevastyyan Bulatov

No.	Pos.	Nation	Player
69	DF	RUS	Yaroslav Svanson
74	MF	RUS	Samir Zakirzyanov
76	DF	RUS	Pavel Klinov
79	DF	RUS	Gleb Levadny
80	MF	RUS	Mikhail Pykhcheyev
82	FW	RUS	Ilya Vsyakikh
83	MF	RUS	Dmitry Cherkasov
84	DF	RUS	Arkhip Yefremov
85	MF	RUS	Aleksandr Chernykh
86	DF	RUS	Umakhan Chamsadinov
87	DF	RUS	Oleg Nekrasov
88	GK	RUS	Maksim Rudakov
89	FW	RUS	Yaroslav Frolov
91	MF	RUS	Ivan Morozov
92	GK	RUS	Timofey Visyagin
93	GK	RUS	Kirill Mikheyev
96	MF	RUS	Kirill Dudarin
97	DF	RUS	Sergey Kazhura
98	MF	RUS	Bakhammad Khadzhimusala
