= Hodaifa El Mhassani =

Moroccan footballer (born 1999)

Personal information
- Date of birth: 13 November 1999 (age 27)
- Place of birth: Tétouan, Morocco
- Height: 1.66 m (5 ft 5 in)
- Position: Right-back

Team information
- Current team: Fakel Voronezh
- Number: 22

Youth career
- MA Tétouan

Senior career*
Years	Team	Apps	(Gls)
2018–2024	MA Tétouan		
2024–2026	FUS Rabat	50	(4)
2026–	Fakel Voronezh	5	(0)
- * Club domestic league appearances and goals as of 21 November 2026

Hodaifa El Mhassani (Arabic: حذيفة المحساني; born 13 November 1999) is a Moroccan football player who plays as a right-back for Russian club Fakel Voronezh.

== Career ==
El Mhassani was raised in the youth system of MA Tétouan and played for the club for the first several years of his senior career, before switching to FUS Rabat in the summer of 2024.

On 3 August 2026, El Mhassani signed a contract with Russian Premier League club Fakel Voronezh for two seasons, with an option for the third season.

He made his RPL debut for Fakel on 5 September 2026 in a game against Rostov.
