= Vyacheslav Dorovskikh =

Russian footballer (born 2003)

Personal information
- Full name: Vyacheslav Vladimirovich Dorovskikh
- Date of birth: 14 September 2003 (age 23)
- Place of birth: Voronezh, Russia
- Height: 1.98 m (6 ft 6 in)
- Position: Goalkeeper

Team information
- Current team: Fakel Voronezh
- Number: 35

Youth career
- 2010–2023: Fakel Voronezh

Senior career*
Years	Team	Apps	(Gls)
2022–	Fakel Voronezh	1	(0)
2025–2026	→ Kaluga (loan)	19	(0)
- * Club domestic league appearances and goals as of 10 October 2026

Vyacheslav Vladimirovich Dorovskikh (Russian: Вячеслав Владимирович Доровских; born 14 September 2003) is a Russian football player who plays as a goalkeeper for Fakel Voronezh.

== Career ==
Dorovskikh was raised in the academy of Fakel Foronezh and signed his first professional contract with the club in March 2022. He was first included in the senior team's matchday lineup in November 2022 as a substitute and appeared on the bench many times in the 2023–24 and 2024–25 seasons.

In 2025, Dorovskikh was loaned twice to the third-tier Russian Second League Division A club Kaluga, where he made his professional debut in May.

Dorovskikh made his senior debut for Fakel on 1 September 2026 in a Russian Cup game against Krasnodar. On 10 October 2026, he made his Russian Premier League debut for Fakel against Lokomotiv Moscow in a 0–5 Fakel loss.

== Personal life ==
Earlier in his career, he used the patronymic Sergeyevich (Vyacheslav Sergeyevich Dorovskikh) which is still referenced in many sources. The official Russian Premier League website lists his patronymic as Vladimirovich.

== Career statistics ==
As of 10 October 2026

Club	Season	League			Cup		Total	
Club	Season	Division	Apps	Goals	Apps	Goals	Apps	Goals
Fakel Voronezh	2022–23	Russian Premier League	0	0	0	0	0	0
Fakel Voronezh	2023–24	Russian Premier League	0	0	0	0	0	0
Fakel Voronezh	2024–25	Russian Premier League	0	0	0	0	0	0
Fakel Voronezh	2026–27	Russian Premier League	1	0	1	0	2	0
Fakel Voronezh	Career total		1	0	1	0	2	0
Kaluga (loan)	2024–25	Russian Second League A	1	0	0	0	1	0
Kaluga (loan)	2025–26	Russian Second League A	18	0	0	0	18	0
Kaluga (loan)	Total		19	0	0	0	19	0
Career total			20	0	1	0	21	0
