= Maksim Syshchenko =

Russian footballer (born 2004)

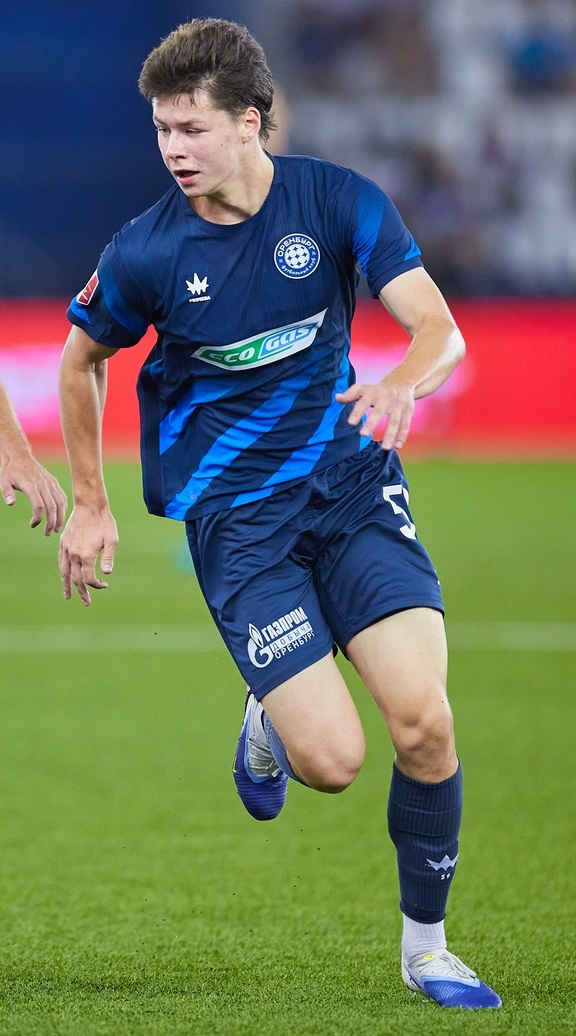
- Syshchenko with Orenburg in 2025

Personal information
- Full name: Maksim Andreyevich Syshchenko
- Date of birth: 24 June 2004 (age 22)
- Place of birth: Donetsk, Ukraine
- Height: 1.85 m (6 ft 1 in)
- Position: Centre-back

Team information
- Current team: Orenburg
- Number: 59

Youth career
- –2015: DFL Podolsk
- 2016–2020: Chertanovo
- 2020–2022: FShM Moscow
- 2022–2023: Torpedo Moscow

Senior career*
Years	Team	Apps	(Gls)
2020	Vityaz Podolsk (amateur)		
2023–	Orenburg	3	(0)
2023–2025	→ Orenburg-2	39	(2)
2025–2026	→ Chernomorets Novorossiysk (loan)	10	(0)
- * Club domestic league appearances and goals as of 1 November 2026

Maksim Andreyevich Syshchenko (Russian: Максим Андреевич Сыщенко; born 24 June 2004) is a Russian football player who plays as a centre-back for Orenburg.

== Career ==
Syshchenko made his debut in the Russian Premier League for Orenburg on 19 April 2025 in a game against Dynamo Makhachkala. He started and played the full game.

On 31 August 2025, Syshchenko moved on loan to Chernomorets Novorossiysk.

== Career statistics ==
As of 1 November 2026

Club	Season	League			Cup		Total	
Club	Season	Division	Apps	Goals	Apps	Goals	Apps	Goals
Orenburg-2	2023	Russian Second League B	15	0	–		15	0
Orenburg-2	2024	Russian Second League B	20	2	–		20	2
Orenburg-2	2025	Russian Second League B	1	0	–		1	0
Orenburg-2	2026	Russian Second League B	3	0	–		3	0
Orenburg-2	Total		39	2	0	0	39	2
Orenburg	2023–24	Russian Premier League	0	0	0	0	0	0
Orenburg	2024–25	Russian Premier League	3	0	0	0	3	0
Orenburg	2025–26	Russian Premier League	0	0	3	0	3	0
Orenburg	2026–27	Russian Premier League	0	0	2	0	2	0
Orenburg	Total		3	0	5	0	8	0
Chernomorets Novorossiysk (loan)	2025–26	Russian First League	10	0	2	0	12	0
Career total			52	2	7	0	59	2
