= Andrey Kasadzhikov =

Russian footballer (born 2007)

Personal information
- Full name: Andrey Sergeyevich Kasadzhikov
- Date of birth: 2 October 2007 (age 19)
- Place of birth: St. Petersburg, Russia
- Height: 1.85 m (6 ft 1 in)
- Position: Left winger

Team information
- Current team: Orenburg (on loan from Zenit Saint Petersburg)
- Number: 77

Youth career
- 2022–2024: SShor Zenit
- 2024–2025: Zenit St. Petersburg

Senior career*
Years	Team	Apps	(Gls)
2025–	Zenit-2 St. Petersburg	18	(7)
2025–	Zenit St. Petersburg	0	(0)
2026–	→ Orenburg (loan)	14	(2)

International career^{‡}
2025–	Russia U19	7	(1)
- * Club domestic league appearances and goals as of 21 November 2026 ‡ National team caps and goals as of 9 June 2026

Andrey Sergeyevich Kasadzhikov (Russian: Андрей Сергеевич Касаджиков; born 2 October 2007) is a Russian football player who plays as a left winger for Orenburg on loan from Zenit St. Petersburg.

== Youth career ==
In the 2022–23 season, Andrey Kasadzhikov joined SShor Zenit, making his Youth Football League (U 15) debut with the club. During his time with the SShor Zenit, Kasadzhikov made 70 appearances, scoring 33 goals and providing 10 assists.

In late 2024, Kasadzhikov moved to FC Zenit U19. The following season, he featured in the Youth Football League A, helping the team secure the championship title. Kasadzhikov also finished as the tournament's third-highest scorer with 16 goals.

== Club career ==
He made his senior debut for the reserve squad Zenit-2 St. Petersburg in the fourth-tier Russian Second League Division B in 2025. He also appeared on the bench for the main Zenit squad for the first time late in 2025 in a Russian Cup game.

On 11 July 2026, Kasadzhikov was loaned by Russian Premier League club Orenburg. He made his RPL debut for Orenburg on 26 July 2026 in a game against Rostov. He was substituted in the 65th minute with Orenburg down 0–1, in the 84th minute he assisted on the equalizer by Ruslan Kul, and in the added time Andrey scored to complete a 2–1 comeback. He was chosen as player of the match.

== Personal life ==
His twin brother Aleksey Kasadzhikov is also a football player. Aleksey signed his own Russian Premier League contract with Akhmat Grozny one day before Andrey signed with Orenburg.

== Career statistics ==
As of 21 November 2026

Club	Season	League			Cup		Total	
Club	Season	Division	Apps	Goals	Apps	Goals	Apps	Goals
Zenit-2 St. Petersburg	2025	Russian Second League B	2	0	—		2	0
Zenit-2 St. Petersburg	2025–26	Russian Second League A	16	7	—		16	7
Zenit-2 St. Petersburg	Total		18	7	0	0	18	7
Zenit St. Petersburg	2025–26	Russian Premier League	0	0	0	0	0	0
Orenburg (loan)	2026–27	Russian Premier League	14	2	4	3	18	5
Career total			32	9	4	3	36	12
