= Matvey Bardachyov =

Russian footballer (born 2006)

Personal information
- Full name: Matvey Alekseyevich Bardachyov
- Date of birth: 24 March 2006 (age 20)
- Place of birth: Krasnodar, Russia
- Height: 1.87 m (6 ft 2 in)
- Position: Centre-back

Team information
- Current team: Fakel Voronezh (on loan from Zenit St. Petersburg)
- Number: 53

Youth career
- –2021: Krasnodar Krai Football Academy
- 2021–2024: Zenit St. Petersburg

Senior career*
Years	Team	Apps	(Gls)
2024–	Zenit St. Petersburg	0	(0)
2024–	→ Zenit-2 St. Petersburg	13	(0)
2024–2025	→ Ural Yekaterinburg (loan)	5	(0)
2025–2026	→ Ural Yekaterinburg (loan)	22	(4)
2026–	→ Fakel Voronezh (loan)	12	(1)

International career^{‡}
2022	Russia U16	2	(0)
2022–2023	Russia U17	4	(0)
2023	Russia U18	3	(0)
2024–	Russia U21	12	(1)
- * Club domestic league appearances and goals as of 21 November 2026 ‡ National team caps and goals as of 9 June 2026

Matvey Alekseyevich Bardachyov (Russian: Матвей Алексеевич Бардачёв; born 24 March 2006) is a Russian football player who plays as a centre-back for Fakel Voronezh on loan from Zenit St. Petersburg.

== Career ==
Bardachyov joined the academy of Zenit St. Petersburg in 2021 and was regularly called up to the main squad in 2024, but remained on the bench in all official games, appearing in several friendlies. He was loaned to Ural Yekaterinburg in the Russian First League for the first half of the 2024–25 season, and then again for the 2025–26 season.

On 24 July 2026, Bardachyov was loaned by Russian Premier League club Fakel Voronezh.

Bardachyov made his debut in the RPL for Fakel on 10 August 2026 in a game against Akhmat Grozny.

== Career statistics ==
As of 21 November 2026

Club	Season	League			Cup		Other		Total	
Club	Season	Division	Apps	Goals	Apps	Goals	Apps	Goals	Apps	Goals
Zenit St. Petersburg	2023–24	Russian Premier League	0	0	0	0	—		0	0
Zenit St. Petersburg	2024–25	Russian Premier League	0	0	0	0	—		0	0
Zenit St. Petersburg	Total		0	0	0	0	0	0	0	0
Zenit-2 St. Petersburg	2024	Russian Second League B	12	0	—		—		12	0
Zenit-2 St. Petersburg	2025	Russian Second League B	1	0	—		—		1	0
Zenit-2 St. Petersburg	Total		13	0	0	0	0	0	13	0
Ural Yekaterinburg (loan)	2024–25	Russian First League	5	0	1	0	—		6	0
Ural Yekaterinburg (loan)	2025–26	Russian First League	22	4	0	0	1 (Note: Appearance in promotion play-offs)	0	23	4
Ural Yekaterinburg (loan)	Total		27	4	1	0	1	0	29	4
Fakel Voronezh (loan)	2026–27	Russian Premier League	12	1	3	0	—		15	1
Career total			52	5	4	0	1	0	57	5
