= Artyom Kasimov =

Russian footballer (born 2003)

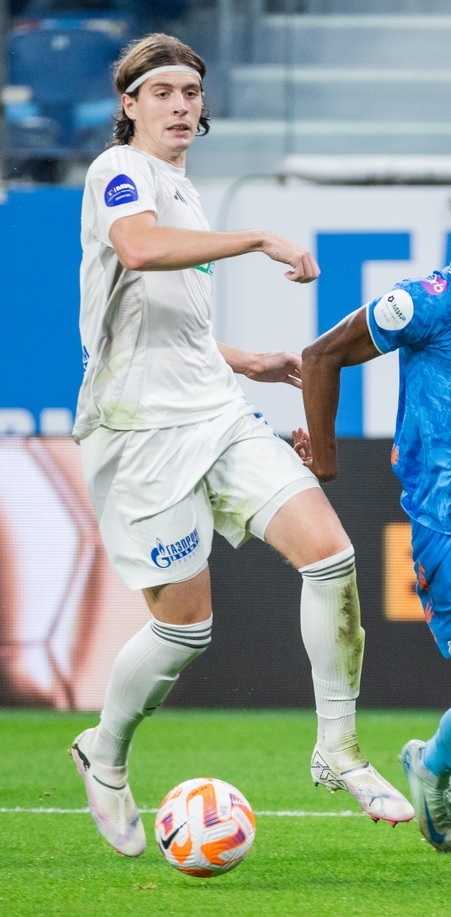
- Kasimov with Orenburg in 2024

Personal information
- Full name: Artyom Timurovich Kasimov
- Date of birth: 17 April 2003 (age 23)
- Place of birth: Astrakhan, Russia
- Height: 1.92 m (6 ft 4 in)
- Position: Centre-back

Team information
- Current team: Orenburg
- Number: 38

Youth career
- –2013: DYuSSh №8 Astrakhan
- 2013–2014: Olimpia Volgograd
- 2014–2017: Krasnodar
- 2018: Rotor Volgograd
- 2018: Urozhay Krasnodar
- 2019–2020: Zenit St. Petersburg

Senior career*
Years	Team	Apps	(Gls)
2021–2024	Zenit St. Petersburg	0	(0)
2021–2023	→ Zenit-2 St. Petersburg	47	(5)
2024	→ Dynamo Makhachkala (loan)	11	(0)
2024–	Orenburg	28	(1)

International career^{‡}
2021	Russia U-18	2	(0)
2021	Russia U-19	2	(1)
- * Club domestic league appearances and goals as of 21 November 2026 ‡ National team caps and goals as of 7 September 2021

Artyom Timurovich Kasimov (Russian: Артём Тимурович Касимов; born 17 April 2003) is a Russian football player who plays as a centre-back for Orenburg.

== Career ==
On 16 June 2024, Kasimov signed with Russian Premier League club Orenburg.

Kasimov made his debut for Orenburg on 31 July 2024 in a Russian Cup game against Khimki. He made his Russian Premier League debut on 5 October 2024 against Zenit St. Petersburg.

== Career statistics ==
As of 21 November 2026

Club	Season	League			Cup		Total	
Club	Season	Division	Apps	Goals	Apps	Goals	Apps	Goals
Zenit-2 St. Petersburg	2020–21	Russian Second League	2	0	–		2	0
Zenit-2 St. Petersburg	2021–22	Russian Second League	15	2	–		15	2
Zenit-2 St. Petersburg	2022–23	Russian Second League	16	1	–		16	1
Zenit-2 St. Petersburg	2023	Russian Second League B	14	2	–		14	2
Zenit-2 St. Petersburg	Total		47	5	0	0	47	5
Dynamo Makhachkala (loan)	2023–24	Russian First League	11	0	–		11	0
Orenburg	2024–25	Russian Premier League	11	1	5	0	16	1
Orenburg	2025–26	Russian Premier League	15	0	5	0	20	0
Orenburg	2026–27	Russian Premier League	2	0	5	0	7	0
Orenburg	Total		28	1	15	0	43	1
Career total			86	6	15	0	101	6
