= Strahinja Eraković =

Serbian footballer (born 2001)

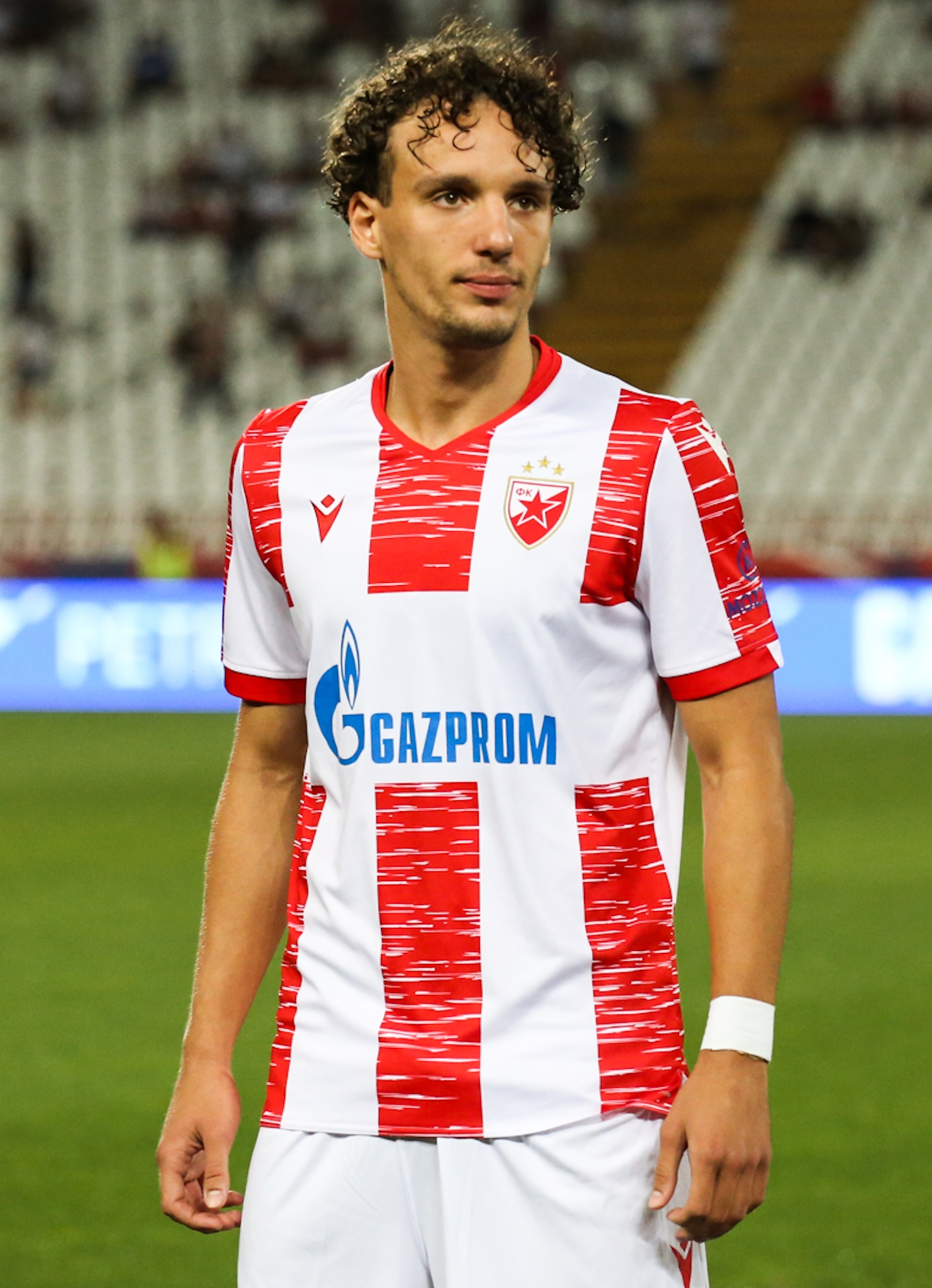
- Eraković with Red Star Belgrade in 2021

Personal information
- Full name: Strahinja Eraković
- Date of birth: 22 January 2001 (age 25)
- Place of birth: Belgrade, FR Yugoslavia
- Height: 1.86 m (6 ft 1 in)
- Position: Centre-back

Team information
- Current team: Samsunspor (on loan from Zenit Saint Petersburg)
- Number: 16

Youth career
- 2010–2019: Red Star Belgrade

Senior career*
Years	Team	Apps	(Gls)
2019–2023	Red Star Belgrade	79	(0)
2019–2020	→ Grafičar Beograd (loan)	21	(2)
2023–	Zenit Saint Petersburg	61	(0)
2026	→ Red Star Belgrade (loan)	16	(1)
2026–	→ Samsunspor (loan)	8	(0)

International career^{‡}
2017–2018	Serbia U17	11	(1)
2019–2020	Serbia U19	7	(1)
2021	Serbia U20	1	(0)
2020–2022	Serbia U21	6	(1)
2022–	Serbia	26	(1)
- * Club domestic league appearances and goals as of 21 November 2026 ‡ National team caps and goals as of 16 November 2026

Strahinja Eraković (Serbian Cyrillic: Страхиња Ераковић; born 22 January 2001) is a Serbian professional footballer who plays as a centre-back for Turkish club Samsunspor on loan from Russian club Zenit Saint Petersburg, and the Serbia national team.

== Club career ==
=== Red Star Belgrade ===
Eraković joined Red Star Belgrade in 2010 at the age of nine. He played for every youth category for the Belgrade club and was the captain of the Under-19 side. Eraković represented the club in UEFA Youth League, playing matches against Napoli and Paris Saint-Germain.

Eraković made his first-team debut for Red Star Belgrade on 1 August 2020 in a Superliga match against Novi Pazar. Despite being just 19, he quickly became a regular footballer for the champions of Serbia. In his first season, Eraković played against Hoffenheim, Gent and Slovan Liberec in the UEFA Europa League. He was a part of the Red Star Belgrade club that won the first league and cup double after a 14-year wait.

In the 2021–22 season, Eraković became one of the most important players for the club and ranked among the players with most minutes spent on the pitch. He was a first-team regular in European competition as well, playing against Braga, Midtjylland and Ludogorets in the Europa League group stage. He captained the side in the away match at Ludogorets. Red Star Belgrade qualified for the competition's knockout stage and Eraković played in both legs as Red Star Belgrade bowed out of the competition with a 4–2 aggregate defeat against Rangers FC of Scotland. Eraković played as Red Star Belgrade secured back-to-back Superliga and Kup Srbije doubles.

At the start of the 2022–23 season, Eraković signed a new contract to remain at Red Star Belgrade until June 2026.

=== Loan to Grafičar ===
Eraković spent the 2019–20 season playing for RFK Grafičar, Red Star Belgrade's affiliate club in the Prva liga Srbije, the second tier of Serbian football. Eraković appeared in 21 games and scored two goals for Grafičar.

=== Zenit Saint Petersburg ===
On 23 July 2023, Eraković agreed to join Russian champions Zenit Saint Petersburg on a four-year contract, with the option to extend for another year.

On 4 February 2026, Eraković returned to Red Star Belgrade on loan with an option to buy.

On 5 September 2026, Zenit announced a new loan for Eraković to Samsunspor in Turkey.

== International career ==
Eraković was eligible to represent Australia via his mother, who has Australian citizenship, but he rejected the offer.

Having been captain of all Serbian youth national teams, Eraković debuted for the Serbian senior squad in a 2022–23 UEFA Nations League match against Norway. In November 2022, he was selected in Serbia's squad for the 2022 FIFA World Cup in Qatar, but did not appear in any match.

== Career statistics ==
=== Club ===
As of match played 11 August 2026

Appearances and goals by club, season and competition
Club	Season	League			National cup (Note: Includes Serbian Cup, Russian Cup)		Europe		Other		Total	
Club	Season	Division	Apps	Goals	Apps	Goals	Apps	Goals	Apps	Goals	Apps	Goals
Grafičar Beograd (loan)	2019–20	Serbian First League	21	2	0	0	—		—		21	2
Red Star Belgrade	2020–21	Serbian SuperLiga	13	0	2	0	4	0	—		19	0
Red Star Belgrade	2021–22	Serbian SuperLiga	33	0	2	0	6	0	—		41	0
Red Star Belgrade	2022–23	Serbian SuperLiga	33	0	0	0	10	0	—		43	0
Red Star Belgrade	Total		79	0	4	0	20	0	—		103	0
Zenit	2023–24	Russian Premier League	27	0	10	0	—		—		37	0
Zenit	2024–25	Russian Premier League	22	0	6	0	—		1 (Note: Appearance in Russian Super Cup)	0	29	0
Zenit	2025–26	Russian Premier League	12	0	7	0	—		—		19	0
Zenit	Total		61	0	23	0	—		1	0	85	0
Red Star Belgrade (loan)	2025–26	Serbian SuperLiga	13	1	1	0	2	0	—		16	1
Red Star Belgrade (loan)	2026–27	Serbian SuperLiga	3	0	0	0	2	0	—		5	0
Red Star Belgrade (loan)	Total		16	1	1	0	4	0	—		21	1
Career total			177	3	28	0	24	0	1	0	230	3

=== International ===
As of 16 November 2026

Appearances and goals by national team and year
National team	Year	Apps	Goals
Serbia	2022	2	0
Serbia	2023	4	1
Serbia	2024	6	0
Serbia	2025	6	0
Serbia	2026	8	0
Total		26	1

Scores and results list Serbia's goal tally first.

No.	Date	Venue	Cap	Opponent	Score	Result	Competition
1.	16 June 2023	Franz Horr Stadium, Vienna, Austria	5	Jordan	1–0	3–2	Friendly

== Honours ==
Red Star Belgrade

- Serbian SuperLiga: 2020–21, 2021–22, 2022–23, 2025–26
- Serbian Cup: 2020–21, 2021–22, 2022–23, 2025–26

Zenit Saint Petersburg

- Russian Premier League: 2023–24, 2025–26
- Russian Cup: 2023–24
- Russian Super Cup: 2024

Individual

- Serbian SuperLiga Team of the Season: 2022–23
- Serbian SuperLiga Young Player of the Season: 2022–23
