= Yegor Nazarenko =

Russian footballer (born 2005)

Personal information
- Full name: Yegor Alekseyevich Nazarenko
- Date of birth: 3 August 2005 (age 21)
- Place of birth: Kostroma, Russia
- Height: 1.83 m (6 ft 0 in)
- Positions: Attacking midfielder; winger

Team information
- Current team: Orenburg (on loan from Dynamo Moscow)
- Number: 11

Youth career
- 2012–2017: Dynamo Kostroma
- 2017–2021: Dynamo Moscow

Senior career*
Years	Team	Apps	(Gls)
2022–	Dynamo Moscow	1	(0)
2022–2025	→ Dynamo-2 Moscow	61	(8)
2025–2026	→ Spartak Kostroma (loan)	24	(4)
2026–	→ Orenburg (loan)	12	(0)

International career^{‡}
2019–2020	Russia U-15	6	(3)
2021	Russia U-16	2	(0)
2021–2022	Russia U-17	5	(0)
- * Club domestic league appearances and goals as of 1 November 2026 ‡ National team caps and goals as of 10 February 2022

Yegor Alekseyevich Nazarenko (Russian: Егор Алексеевич Назаренко; born 3 August 2005) is a Russian football player who plays as an attacking midfielder or winger for Orenburg on loan from Dynamo Moscow.

== Club career ==
In March 2024, Nazarenko extended his contract with Dynamo Moscow until June 2027.

Nazarenko made his debut for the main squad of Dynamo Moscow on 2 April 2024 in a Russian Cup game against SKA-Khabarovsk. He made his Russian Premier League debut on 27 July 2024 against Lokomotiv Moscow.

On 19 June 2026, Nazarenko was loaned to Orenburg for the 2026–27 season, with an option to buy.

== Career statistics ==
As of match played 1 November 2026

Appearances and goals by club, season and competition
Club	Season	League			Cup		Total	
Club	Season	Division	Apps	Goals	Apps	Goals	Apps	Goals
Dynamo-2 Moscow	2021–22	Russian Second League	1	0	—		1	0
Dynamo-2 Moscow	2022–23	Russian Second League	11	1	—		11	1
Dynamo-2 Moscow	2023	Russian Second League B	16	4	—		16	4
Dynamo-2 Moscow	2024	Russian Second League B	19	2	—		19	2
Dynamo-2 Moscow	2024–25	Russian Second League A	14	1	—		14	1
Dynamo-2 Moscow	Total		61	8	—		61	8
Dynamo Moscow	2023–24	Russian Premier League	0	0	1	0	1	0
Dynamo Moscow	2024–25	Russian Premier League	1	0	2	0	3	0
Dynamo Moscow	Total		1	0	3	0	4	0
Spartak Kostroma (loan)	2025–26	Russian First League	24	4	1	0	25	4
Orenburg (loan)	2026–27	Russian Premier League	12	0	5	1	17	1
Career total			98	12	9	1	!107	13
