= Aleksandr Kovalenko (footballer) =

Russian footballer (born 2003)

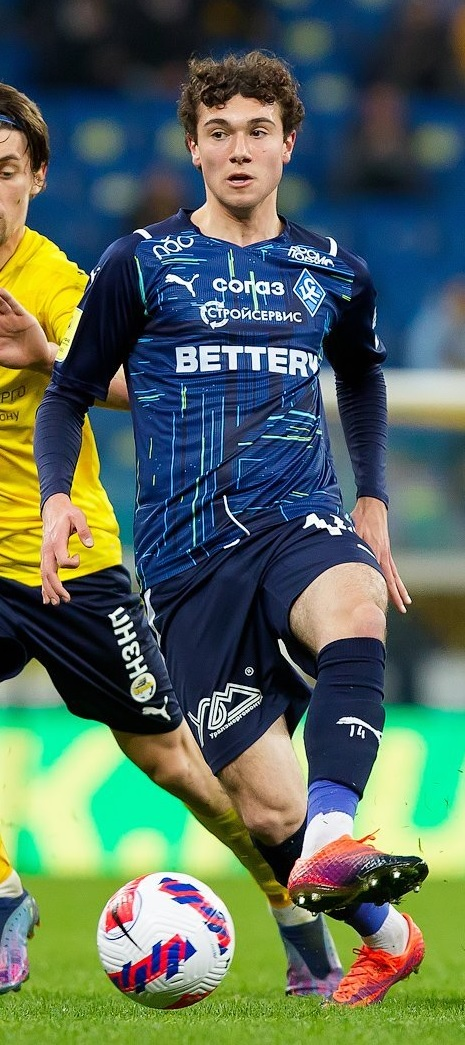
- Kovalenko with Krylia Sovetov Samara in 2022

Personal information
- Full name: Aleksandr Igorevich Kovalenko
- Date of birth: 8 August 2003 (age 23)
- Place of birth: Moscow, Russia
- Height: 1.77 m (5 ft 10 in)
- Position: Midfielder

Team information
- Current team: Lokomotiv Moscow (on loan from Sochi)
- Number: 8

Youth career
- Dynamo Moscow
- 2015–2021: Chertanovo Education Center

Senior career*
Years	Team	Apps	(Gls)
2021	Chertanovo Moscow	13	(0)
2022	Krylia Sovetov Samara	14	(0)
2022–2023	Sochi	0	(0)
2022–2023	→ Krylia Sovetov Samara (loan)	21	(1)
2023–2024	Zenit Saint Petersburg	6	(0)
2024–2025	Orenburg	17	(0)
2025–	Sochi	24	(0)
2026–	→ Lokomotiv Moscow (loan)	10	(1)

International career^{‡}
2021	Russia U18	2	(1)
2021	Russia U19	9	(2)
2022	Russia U21	2	(0)
2022–	Russia	1	(0)
- * Club domestic league appearances and goals as of 6 November 2026 ‡ National team caps and goals as of 5 January 2023

Aleksandr Igorevich Kovalenko (Russian: Александр Игоревич Коваленко; born 8 August 2003) is a Russian football player who plays for Lokomotiv Moscow on loan from Sochi.

== Club career ==
After beginning his career with Chertanovo Moscow, on 5 February 2022 Kovalenko joined Russian Premier League club Krylia Sovetov Samara. He made his RPL debut for Krylia Sovetov on 6 March 2022 in a game against Arsenal Tula.

On 25 July 2022, Kovalenko signed with Sochi and was loaned back to Krylia Sovetov.

On 30 June 2023, Kovalenko moved to Zenit St. Petersburg, signing a five-year contract.

On 16 August 2024, Kovalenko signed with Orenburg.

On 25 July 2025, Kovalenko returned to Sochi on a four-year contract.

On 23 June 2026, Kovalenko moved to Lokomotiv Moscow on a season-long loan with an option to buy.

== International career ==
Kovalenko was called up to the Russia national football team for the first time for a friendly against Kyrgyzstan in September 2022. He made his debut in that game on 24 September 2022.

== Personal life ==
Kovalenko was born to a Ukrainian-Armenian father and an Armenian mother.

His grandfather, also called Aleksandr Kovalenko, won the Soviet Top League once and Soviet Cup twice with Ararat Yerevan.

== Career statistics ==
As of match played 6 November 2026

Appearances and goals by club, season and competition
Club	Season	League			Cup		Other		Total	
Club	Season	Division	Apps	Goals	Apps	Goals	Apps	Goals	Apps	Goals
Chertanovo Moscow	2021–22	Russian Second League	13	0	1	0	—		14	0
Krylia Sovetov Samara	2021–22	Russian Premier League	12	0	—		—		12	0
Sochi	2022–23	Russian Premier League	0	0	0	0	—		0	0
Krylia Sovetov Samara (loan)	2022–23	Russian Premier League	21	1	3	1	—		24	2
Zenit St. Petersburg	2023–24	Russian Premier League	6	0	8	0	0	0	14	0
Orenburg	2024–25	Russian Premier League	17	0	4	0	—		21	0
Sochi	2025–26	Russian Premier League	24	0	4	0	—		28	0
Lokomotiv Moscow (loan)	2026–27	Russian Premier League	10	1	5	1	—		15	2
Career total			103	2	25	2	0	0	128	4

== Honours ==
Zenit Saint Petersburg

- Russian Premier League: 2023–24
- Russian Cup: 2023–24
- Russian Super Cup: 2023
