= FC Fakel Voronezh =

Russian football club

Fakel Voronezh
- Full name: Football club «Fakel» Voronezh
- Nicknames: Fakelony (Torchs); Sine-Belie (The Blue-Whites)
- Founded: 1947; 79 years ago
- Ground: Fakel Stadium
- Capacity: 10,052
- President: Roman Askhabadze
- Head Coach: Khasanbi Bidzhiyev
- League: Russian Premier League
- 2025–26: Russian First League, 2nd of 18 (promoted)
- Website: fakelfc.ru
Home colours

FC Fakel Voronezh (Russian: Футбольный клуб "Факел" Воронеж) is a Russian professional football club based in Voronezh. Founded in 1947, the club has played in the Soviet Top League and the Russian Premier League. The club will return to the Russian Premier League in the 2026–27 season. The club holds the record for fan attendance in Eastern Europe.

== History ==
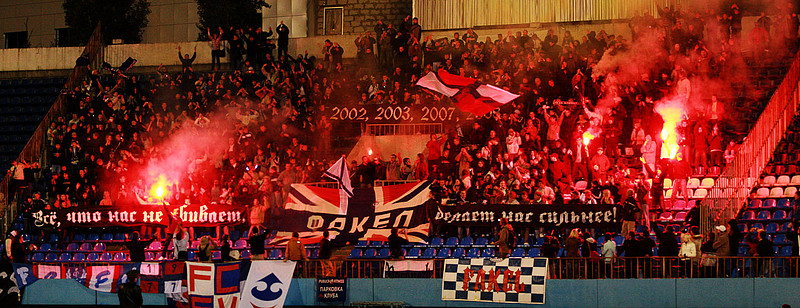
Fakel fans in the Amateur League

The club was founded in 1947 at a then classified airplane plant. For reasons of secrecy, the team was not officially given a name and was referred to as the Voronezh city team. In 1959 the team became a part of Trud sports society and was renamed Trud Voronezh. In 1977 the team was renamed Fakel, meaning "Torch".

The team played in the Soviet League since 1954:

- 1954–1960 in Class B
- 1961 in Class A (Soviet Top League)
- 1962 in Class B
- 1963–1970 in Class A, Group 2
- 1971–1978 in Second League
- 1979–1984 in First League
- 1985 in Top League
- 1986–1987 in First League
- 1988 in Second League
- 1989–1991 in First League
- Premier League: 1961, 1985, 1992, 1997, 2000, 2001, 2022–23, 2023–24, 2024–25
- First League: 1993, 1995–1996, 1998–1999, 2002–2003, 2005–2006, 2011–2012, 2015–2022, 2025–
- Second League: 1994, 2004, 2010, 2012–2015
- Russian Amateur Football League: 2007–2008

The best finish achieved by Fakel in the Premier League was 11th in the 2023–24 season. The club has won 3 Second Division titles.

Fakel has also experienced several short-lived name changes: to Fakel-Profsoyuz in 1992, Voronezh in 2002 and Fakel-Voronezh in 2002–2003.

Fakel and FC Yelets were excluded from the Russian Second Division for attempts to bribe and threaten the referee on 18 July 2009. At the time of exclusion (21 August), Fakel were sixth with 31 points from 19 games, while Yelets were 16th with 9 points from 19 games.

A new club called FC Fakel Voronezh technically independent from the club that played in 2009 as FC Fakel-Voronezh Voronezh was founded in 2010 and played in the Russian Second Division (FSA Voronezh failed licensing for 2010 and the new Fakel was the only Voronezh professional team for 2010). It employed the manager and 6 players from the 2009 FC Fakel-Voronezh roster. The reserve team FC Fakel-d Voronezh played in the Amateur Football League in 2010 (view – FC Fakel-M Voronezh).

Before the 2011–12 season FC Saturn Moscow Oblast dropped out of Russian Premier League due to financial problems. FC Krasnodar replaced them in the Premier League, creating a vacancy in the Russian First Division. Despite only coming in 4th in their Russian Second Division zone in 2010, Fakel volunteered to take the First Division spot, and the Russian Football Union decided to promote the team. They were relegated back to the third level in the same 2011–12 season. They returned to the Russian Football National League in the 2015–16 season. Despite finishing in the relegation zone at the end of the 2017–18 season, the club was not relegated as other clubs ahead in the standings failed to obtain the league license for 2018–19.

They finished in the relegation zone once again in the 2018–19 season, but due to failure of FC Sakhalin Yuzhno-Sakhalinsk and FC Anzhi Makhachkala to acquire a 2019–20 license, they were not relegated.

The 2019–20 season was abandoned due to the COVID-19 pandemic in Russia with Fakel once again in relegation spot. However, due to the pandemic, none of the teams, including Fakel, were relegated.

Fakel finished 2nd in the 2021–22 Russian Football National League to secure promotion to the Russian Premier League for the first time since the 2001 season.

The club's return to the top division was marked by high attendance levels at home matches, fiery support from the stands and loud crowd singing of the biggest hits of Sektor Gaza, a famous local punk rock band. Fakel came 3rd by average attendance in the 2022–23 Russian Premier League just behind FC Zenit Saint Petersburg and FC Krasnodar.

Fakel finished their first season upon return in 14th place, qualifying for relegation play-offs against FC Yenisey Krasnoyarsk. They managed to keep their Premier League spot after defeating Yenisey 3–0 on aggregate.

In 2024 the club moved to the newly built Fakel Stadium from the Trade Unions Central Stadium which was to be demolished and rebuilt.

On 11 May 2025, Fakel lost chances of avoiding relegation to the Russian First League for the 2025–26 season. The club secured return to the top tier on 8 May 2026.

== Current squad ==
As of 10 September 2026

Note: Flags indicate national team as defined under FIFA eligibility rules; some limited exceptions apply. Players may hold more than one non-FIFA nationality.

No.	Pos.	Nation	Player
1	GK	RUS	Daniil Frolkin
5	DF	RUS	Albert Gabarayev
7	FW	RUS	Maksim Turishchev
8	MF	RUS	Abdula Bagamayev
9	FW	FRA	Axel Gnapi
10	MF	RUS	Ilnur Alshin
11	MF	RUS	Aleksei Sutormin
17	MF	BLR	Anton Kavalyow
18	MF	RUS	Kirill Simonov
19	FW	ALB	Belajdi Pusi
20	DF	RUS	Igor Yurganov
22	DF	MAR	Hodaifa El Mhassani
23	MF	RUS	Vyacheslav Yakimov

No.	Pos.	Nation	Player
25	FW	RUS	Aleksandr Belyayev
27	DF	RUS	Stanislav Magkeyev
35	GK	RUS	Vyacheslav Dorovskikh
40	DF	BRA	Clayton (on loan from Internacional)
44	DF	RUS	Yuri Zhuravlyov
52	MF	RUS	Ravil Netfullin
53	DF	RUS	Matvey Bardachyov (on loan from Zenit St. Petersburg)
55	DF	BIH	Darko Todorović
90	FW	RUS	Aleksandr Koksharov (on loan from Krasnodar)
96	GK	RUS	Igor Obukhov
97	MF	RUS	Butta Magomedov
99	MF	RUS	Nikolai Giorgobiani

=== Out on loan ===
Note: Flags indicate national team as defined under FIFA eligibility rules; some limited exceptions apply. Players may hold more than one non-FIFA nationality.

No.	Pos.	Nation	Player
—	DF	RUS	Shota Chikhradze (at Metallurg Lipetsk until 31 December 2026)
—	DF	RUS	Maks Dziov (at Volga Ulyanovsk until 30 June 2027)

No.	Pos.	Nation	Player
—	MF	RUS	Nuri Abdokov (at Veles Moscow until 30 June 2027)
—	FW	RUS	Ilya Vasin (at Arsenal Dzerzhinsk until 31 December 2026)

== Reserve squad ==
Fakel's reserve squad played professionally as FC Fakel-d Voronezh in the Russian Third League in 1997. It re-entered professional football as FC Fakel-M Voronezh for the 2020–21 season.

== Notable players ==
Had international caps for their respective countries. Players whose name is listed in bold represented their countries while playing for Fakel.

Russia/USSR

- (Soviet Union) Viktor Losev
- (Soviet Union) Valeri Shmarov
- (Commonwealth of Independent States) (Russia) Valery Karpin
- (Russia) Aleksandr Filimonov
- (Russia) Lyubomir Kantonistov
- (Russia) Fyodor Kudryashov
- (Russia) Ilya Lantratov
- (Russia) Arseniy Logashov
- (Russia) Artyom Makarchuk
- (Russia) Yevgeny Morozov
- (Russia) Andrei Novosadov
- (Russia) Maksim Osipenko
- (Russia) Ivan Saenko
- (Russia) Roman Vorobyov
- (Russia) Valery Yesipov
- (Russia) Anton Zabolotny

Europe

- (Azerbaijan) Qurban Qurbanov
- (Belarus) Anton Amelchenko
- (Belarus) Radaslaw Arlowski
- (Belarus) Eduard Boltrushevich
- (Belarus) **Anton Kavalyow**
- (Belarus) Andrei Kovalenko
- (Belarus) Vitali Lanko
- (Belarus) Yuri Shukanov
- (Belarus) **Ihar Tarlowski**
- (Latvia) Oļegs Aleksejenko
- (Latvia) Oļegs Karavajevs
- (Latvia) Juris Laizāns
- (Latvia) **Raimonds Laizāns**
- (Latvia) Ivans Lukjanovs
- (Lithuania) Aivaras Laurišas
- (Lithuania) Edgaras Jankauskas
- (Lithuania) **Andrius Jokšas**
- (Lithuania) Pavelas Leusas
- (Lithuania) Andrius Sriubas
- (Romania) Emilian Dolha
- (Serbia) Nemanja Pejčinović
- (Ukraine) Andriy Yudin

Asia

- (Tajikistan) Valeriy Gorbach
- (Uzbekistan) Andrey Akopyants
- (Uzbekistan) Igor Kichigin
- (Uzbekistan) **Vladimir Shishelov**

== Coaching staff ==
Position	Staff
Manager	(Russia) Dmitri Pyatibratov
Assistant Manager	(Russia) Aleksei Rebko
First-Team Coach	(Russia) Valeri Klimov
Goalkeeper Coach	(Russia) Vladimir Sychyov
Fitness Coach	(Russia) Dmitry Sorokin
Team Leader	(Russia) Stanislav Sukhina
Physiotherapist	(Russia) Alexey Muzalevsky
Masseur	(Russia) Alexey Melnikov (Russia) Vladimir Yakushin
Administrator	(Russia) Ruslan Taratukhin (Russia) Vladimir Kopaev
