= FC Orenburg =

Russian football club

Orenburg
- Full name: Football Club Orenburg
- Founded: 1976; 50 years ago
- Ground: Gazovik Stadium
- Capacity: 10,046
- Owner: Gazprom (through subsidiaries)
- Chairman: Vasily Eremyakin
- Manager: Ildar Akhmetzyanov
- League: Russian Premier League
- 2025–26: 12th of 16
- Website: fcorenburg.ru
Home colours	Away colours

FC Orenburg (Russian: ФК «Оренбург») is a Russian professional football club based in Orenburg. Founded in 1976, it plays in the Russian Premier League.

== History ==
It played professionally as Gazovik from 1976 to 1982 and from 1989 on. Before 1976 another Orenburg team, Lokomotiv Orenburg, played professionally, including three seasons in the second-highest Soviet First League in 1960–62. In 1989 Gazovik was called Progress Orenburg. Gazovik began Russian League at Zone 5 of Second League and relegated from Zone 6 from one to Third League in 1993. They stayed in Zone 5 of Third League until 1997 season, when they returned to third level. They finished Ural Povolzhye (Volga Region in Russian) as runner-up in 2006, 2007 and 2008 seasons and finally promoted to the Russian First League in 2010.

On 2 May 2016, the club secured top-two finish in the 2015–16 Russian National Football League and with that, the promotion to the Russian Premier League for the 2016–17 season for the first time in club's history.

On 25 May 2016, the club was renamed from its historical name FC Gazovik Orenburg to FC Orenburg.

The club was relegated back to the second tier at the end of the 2016–17 season after losing a penalty shootout in the relegation playoffs to FC SKA-Khabarovsk. It was promoted back to the Russian Premier League after one season in the second tier. It was relegated at the end of the 2019–20 Russian Premier League season. They were forced to forfeit two games late in the season due to COVID-19 infections in the squad and play more games with a weakened line-up. On 8 May 2021, they secured a second-place finish in the FNL and return to the Russian Premier League after one season in the second tier. However, Russian Football Union rejected the club's application for a RPL license on 5 May 2021 due to the stadium not passing capacity requirements and other conditions, and their appeal was rejected on 12 May 2021. The club considered filing a complaint with the Court of Arbitration for Sport. On 24 May 2021, the club announced they will not file a lawsuit with CAS and will accept the RFU decision. They also announced that the club will begin the stadium reconstruction in June 2021 to bring it up to Premier League standards.

In the 2021–22 season, Orenburg led the FNL for most of the season, before dropping out of the direct promotion spot to the 3rd place on the last matchday. That qualified Orenburg for the promotion play-offs against FC Ufa, which finished 14th in the Premier League. Orenburg won the play-offs 4–3 on aggregate thanks to the second-leg added-time goal by Andrei Malykh and returned to the Russian Premier League after two seasons in the second tier. They finished their first season upon return in 7th place.

On 17 May 2025, Orenburg lost their chances of avoiding relegation from the Russian Premier League.

On 11 July 2025, Orenburg was returned to the Russian Premier League to replace Torpedo Moscow, who were excluded from the league for attempted match-fixing in the previous season.

== Honours ==
Domestic Competitions

- Russian National Football League
  - Champions (2): 2015–16, 2017–18

== Current squad ==
As of 10 September 2026, according to the official RPL website.

Note: Flags indicate national team as defined under FIFA eligibility rules; some limited exceptions apply. Players may hold more than one non-FIFA nationality.

No.	Pos.	Nation	Player
1	GK	RUS	Bogdan Ovsyannikov
2	DF	RUS	Stanislav Poroykov
3	DF	RUS	Danila Vedernikov
4	DF	RUS	Danila Khotulyov
5	DF	RUS	Aleksei Tatayev
6	DF	COL	Jhon Palacios
7	FW	COL	Jersson González (on loan from Independiente Santa Fe)
8	MF	ARG	Damián Puebla
9	FW	RUS	Maksim Savelyev
10	FW	CHI	Jordhy Thompson
11	MF	RUS	Yegor Nazarenko (on loan from Dynamo Moscow)
14	MF	COL	Robert Mejía
18	MF	RUS	Dmitri Vasilyev
19	FW	BRA	Alexandre Jesus
20	MF	RUS	Dmitri Rybchinsky
21	FW	ARG	Benjamín Bosch (on loan from Talleres)
22	DF	BLR	Anton Lukashov
24	DF	COD	Maxime Sivis

No.	Pos.	Nation	Player
26	MF	BUL	Emil Tsenov
27	MF	RUS	Renat Golybin
30	FW	BIH	Gedeon Guzina
35	GK	RUS	Aleksandr Dyogtev (on loan from Zenit St. Petersburg)
38	DF	RUS	Artyom Kasimov
44	DF	POR	João Silva
53	GK	RUS	Vyacheslav Korobov
57	MF	RUS	Yevgeni Bolotov
59	DF	RUS	Maksim Syshchenko
63	MF	RUS	Omar Minatulayev
65	MF	RUS	Ivan Ivashchenko
77	FW	RUS	Andrey Kasadzhikov (on loan from Zenit St. Petersburg)
78	MF	RUS	Ruslan Kul
80	MF	RUS	Mikhail Pykhcheyev
88	GK	RUS	Maksim Rudakov
94	MF	RUS	Aleksey Baranovsky
96	MF	RUS	Kirill Dudarin

=== Out on loan ===
Note: Flags indicate national team as defined under FIFA eligibility rules; some limited exceptions apply. Players may hold more than one non-FIFA nationality.

No.	Pos.	Nation	Player
—	GK	RUS	Andrey Khodanovich (at Volga Ulyanovsk until 30 June 2027)
—	DF	RUS	Semyon Stolbov (at Torpedo Miass until 31 December 2026)
—	MF	MNE	Vladan Bubanja (at Rapid București until 30 June 2027)

No.	Pos.	Nation	Player
—	FW	BLR	Timofey Martynov (at Isloch Minsk Raion until 31 December 2026)
—	FW	RUS	Atsamaz Revazov (at Rotor Volgograd until 30 June 2027)

== Coaching staff ==
- Manager – Vladimir Slišković
- Assistant managers – Ilshat Aitkulov (senior), Ivan Bubalo, Muhamed Berberović, Vladimir Poluyakhtov
- Goalkeeping coach – Yuriy Okroshidze
- Conditioning coach – Semir Čilić

== Managers ==
- (Russia) Valeri Bogdanov (1997–1998)
- (Russia) Aleksandr Korolyov (1999–2001)
- (Russia) Adyam Kuzyayev (interim) (2003)
- (Russia) Andrei Piatnitski (2003)
- (Russia) Yevgeni Smertin (2004)
- (Russia) Aleksandr Averyanov (2006–2009)
- (Russia) Ilshat Aitkulov (interim) (2009)
- (Russia) Konstantin Galkin (2009–2011)
- (Russia) Robert Yevdokimov (2011–2017)
- (Georgia (country)) Temur Ketsbaia (2017)
- (Russia) Vladimir Fedotov (2017–2019)
- (Russia) Konstantin Yemelyanov (2019–2020)
- (Russia) Konstantin Paramonov (2020)
- (Russia) Ilshat Aitkulov (interim) (2020)
- (Czech Republic) Marcel Lička (2020–2023)
- (Czech Republic) Jiří Jarošík (2023–2023)
- (Bosnia and Herzegovina) Vladimir Slišković (2024–2025)

== Notable players ==
Had international caps for their respective countries. Players whose name is listed in bold represented their countries while playing for Orenburg.

Russia

- (Russia) **Arsen Adamov**
- (Russia) Aleksandr Kovalenko
- (Russia) Aleksei Mironov
- (Russia) Aleksei Sutormin
- (Russia) **Vladimir Sychevoy**
- (Russia) Sergei Terekhov
- (Russia) Dmitry Vorobyov
- (Russia) Roman Vorobyov
- (Russia) Dmitry Yefremov

Europe

- (Belarus) Vital Bulyga
- (Belarus) **Kirill Kaplenko**
- (Belarus) Yury Kavalyow
- (Belarus) **Anton Lukashov**
- (Belarus) **Pavel Nyakhaychyk**
- (Belarus) **Aleksandr Pavlovets**
- (Belarus) **Kiryl Pyachenin**
- (Belarus) **Mikhail Sivakow**
- (Bosnia and Herzegovina) **Ivan Bašić**
- (Bosnia and Herzegovina) Renato Gojković
- (Kazakhstan) Almir Mukhutdinov
- (Kazakhstan) Ivan Popov
- (Latvia) **Artūrs Zjuzins**
- (Lithuania) **Mantas Savėnas**
- (Moldova) **Serghei Pașcenco**
- (Slovakia) Michal Ďuriš
- (Slovenia) Žiga Škoflek

Africa

- (Ghana) Joel Fameyeh

Asia

- (Kyrgyzstan) Nazim Ajiev
- (Kyrgyzstan) Igor Sergeyev
- (Tajikistan) **Farkhod Vosiyev**
- (Turkmenistan) Farhat Bazarow
- (Uzbekistan) Vadim Afonin
- (Uzbekistan) **Sanzhar Tursunov**
- (Uzbekistan) Ruslan Uzakov

CONCACAF

- (Costa Rica) Jimmy Marín
