= 2020–21 FC Zenit Saint Petersburg season =

Zenit Saint Petersburg
2020–21 season
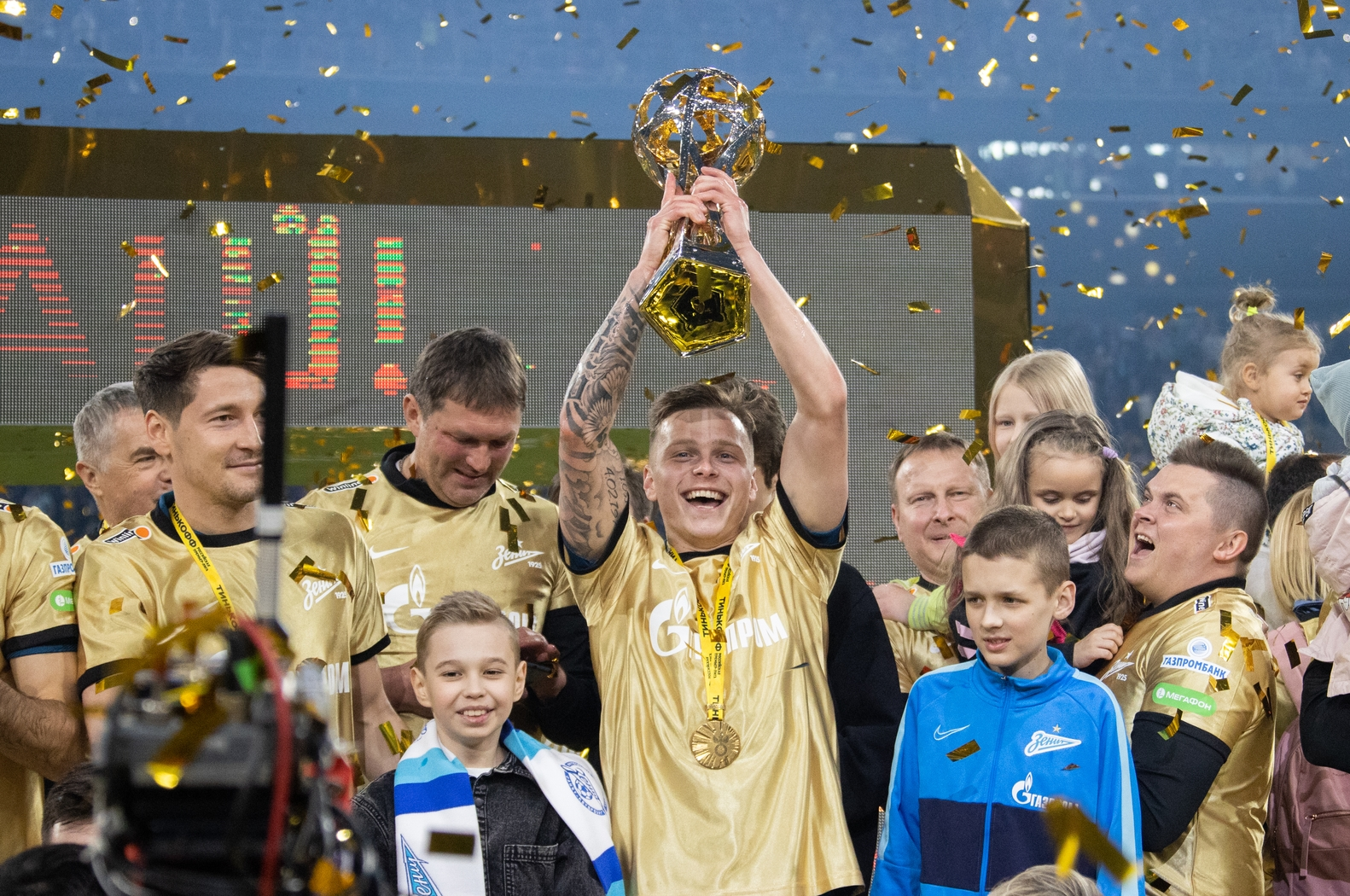
- FC Zenit players and fans celebrating their Russian Premier League title win
- Chairman: Aleksander Medvedev
- Manager: Sergei Semak
- Stadium: Gazprom Arena
- Premier League: Champions
- Russian Cup: Round of 16
- Super Cup: Winners
- UEFA Champions League: Group stage
- Top goalscorer: League: Artem Dzyuba (20); All: Artem Dzyuba (22)
- Highest home attendance: 39,793 vs Lokomotiv Moscow (2 May 2021)
- Lowest home attendance: 1,184 vs Ural Yekaterinburg (5 December 2020)
- Average home league attendance: 18,912 (2 May 2021)
Home colours	Away colours

The 2020–21 FC Zenit Saint Petersburg season was the club's 96th season in existence and the 25th consecutive season in the top flight of Russian football. In addition to the domestic league, Zenit Saint Petersburg participated in this season's editions of the Russian Cup and UEFA Champions League. The season covers the period from August 2020 to 30 June 2021. Zenit ended the season as Premier League and Super Cup champions, reached the Round of 16 in the Russian Cup and finished 4th in their UEFA Champions League Group.

== Season events ==
On 27 July, Zenit announced the signing of Dejan Lovren from Liverpool on a three-year contract.

On 29 July, Oleg Shatov, Igor Smolnikov and Branislav Ivanović all left Zenit after their contracts expired.

On 30 July, Artem Dzyuba signed a new two-year contract with Zenit, with the option of a third.

On 31 July, Zenit announced that Yuri Zhirkov had signed a new contract until the end of the season, whilst Mikhail Kerzhakov had signed a new one-year contract with the option of an additional year.

On 7 August, Emanuel Mammana moved to Sochi on a season-long loan deal.

On 6 October, Zenit announced the signing of Wendel from Sporting CP, on a contract until the end of the 2024/25 season, the departure of Emiliano Rigoni to Elche on a permanent deal, and the re-signing of Daler Kuzyayev on a contract until the summer of 2023 after his contract had expired at the end of the previous season.

On 15 October, Zenit signed Dmitri Chistyakov on loan from Rostov for the remainder of the season, with an option to make the move permanent, whilst Denis Terentyev left the club to return to Rostov on a permanent deal.

On 19 October, the Moscow Oblast governor, Andrey Vorobyov, announced that all sporting events in the area must take place behind closed doors from 21 October until 7 November, meaning Zenits trip to Khimki on 1 November will be played without fans.

== Squad ==
As of match played 16 May 2021

No.	Name	Nationality	Position	Date of birth (age)	Signed from	Signed in	Contract ends	Apps.	Goals
Goalkeepers
41	Mikhail Kerzhakov	(Russia)	GK	28 January 1987 (aged 34)	Anzhi Makhachkala	2015	2021 (+1)	62	0
71	Daniil Odoyevskiy	(Russia)	GK	22 January 2003 (aged 18)	Academy	2019		1	0
99	Andrey Lunyov	(Russia)	GK	13 November 1991 (aged 29)	Ufa	2016	2021	117	0
Defenders
2	Dmitri Chistyakov	(Russia)	DF	13 January 1994 (aged 27)	loan from Rostov	2020		14	0
3	Douglas Santos	(Brazil)	DF	22 March 1994 (aged 27)	Hamburger SV	2019	2024	71	3
4	Danil Krugovoy	(Russia)	DF	28 May 1998 (aged 22)	Ufa	2019	2024	23	0
6	Dejan Lovren	(Croatia)	DF	5 July 1989 (aged 31)	Liverpool	2020	2023	28	2
15	Vyacheslav Karavayev	(Russia)	DF	20 May 1995 (aged 25)	Vitesse	2019	2023	61	4
44	Yaroslav Rakitskyi	(Ukraine)	DF	3 August 1989 (aged 31)	Shakhtar Donetsk	2019	2022	85	5
54	Saba Sazonov	(Russia)	DF	1 February 2002 (aged 19)	Academy	2020		1	0
75	Sergei Chibisov	(Russia)	DF	1 March 2000 (aged 21)	Academy	2020		1	0
80	Ilya Skrobotov	(Russia)	DF	6 July 2000 (aged 20)	Academy	2017		4	1
87	Danila Prokhin	(Russia)	DF	24 May 2001 (aged 19)	Academy	2019		10	0
88	Dmitri Bogayev	(Russia)	DF	24 January 1994 (aged 27)	Palanga	2017	2020	7	0
94	Danila Khotulyov	(Russia)	DF	1 October 2002 (aged 18)	Academy	2020		4	0
Midfielders
5	Wílmar Barrios	(Colombia)	MF	16 October 1993 (aged 27)	Boca Juniors	2019	2023	82	2
14	Daler Kuzyayev	(Russia)	MF	15 January 1993 (aged 28)	Zenit St.Petersburg	2020	2023	118	14
17	Andrei Mostovoy	(Russia)	MF	5 November 1997 (aged 23)	Khimki	2019		33	6
18	Yuri Zhirkov	(Russia)	MF	20 August 1983 (aged 37)	Dynamo Moscow	2016	2021	125	5
19	Aleksei Sutormin	(Russia)	MF	10 January 1994 (aged 27)	Rubin Kazan	2019	2022	63	8
20	Wendel	(Brazil)	MF	28 August 1997 (aged 23)	Sporting CP	2020	2025	20	2
21	Aleksandr Yerokhin	(Russia)	MF	13 October 1989 (aged 31)	Rostov	2017	2022	125	25
27	Magomed Ozdoyev	(Russia)	MF	5 November 1992 (aged 28)	Rubin Kazan	2018	2022	99	6
64	Kirill Kravtsov	(Russia)	MF	14 June 2002 (aged 18)	Academy	2020		4	0
74	Sergei Ivanov	(Russia)	MF	7 January 1997 (aged 24)	Academy	2015		1	0
84	Ilya Vorobyov	(Russia)	MF	11 July 1999 (aged 21)	Academy	2017		1	0
	Nikita Koldunov	(Russia)	MF	19 April 2000 (aged 21)	loan from Sochi	2021		0	0
Forwards
7	Sardar Azmoun	(Iran)	FW	1 January 1995 (aged 26)	Rubin Kazan	2019	2022	82	50
8	Malcom	(Brazil)	FW	26 February 1997 (aged 24)	Barcelona	2019	2024	39	7
11	Sebastián Driussi	(Argentina)	FW	9 February 1996 (aged 25)	River Plate	2017	2021	137	25
22	Artem Dzyuba	(Russia)	FW	22 August 1988 (aged 32)	Spartak Moscow	2015	2022 (+1)	208	95
36	Stanislav Krapukhin	(Russia)	FW	28 March 1998 (aged 23)	Zvezda St.Petersburg	2020		4	0
82	Ivan Tarasov	(Russia)	FW	30 January 2000 (aged 21)	Academy	2017		0	0
92	Daniil Shamkin	(Russia)	FW	22 June 2002 (aged 18)	Academy	2020		9	0
	Pavel Dolgov	(Russia)	FW	16 August 1996 (aged 24)	Tom Tomsk	2021		11	0
Away on loan
24	Emanuel Mammana	(Argentina)	DF	10 February 1996 (aged 25)	Lyon	2017	2022	41	0
55	Kirill Kaplenko	(Russia)	MF	15 June 1999 (aged 21)	Krasnodar	2017		3	0
78	Aleksandr Vasyutin	(Russia)	GK	4 March 1995 (aged 26)	Sarpsborg 08	2019	2023	3	0
Left during the season
10	Emiliano Rigoni	(Argentina)	MF	4 February 1993 (aged 28)	Independiente	2017	2021	62	12
34	Denis Terentyev	(Russia)	DF	13 August 1992 (aged 28)	Rostov	2017		13	0
38	Leon Musayev	(Russia)	MF	25 January 1999 (aged 22)	Academy	2016		19	0

=== Out on loan ===
Note: Flags indicate national team as defined under FIFA eligibility rules; some limited exceptions apply. Players may hold more than one non-FIFA nationality.

No.	Pos.	Nation	Player
24	DF	ARG	Emanuel Mammana (at Sochi)
55	MF	RUS	Kirill Kaplenko (at Orenburg)
78	GK	RUS	Aleksandr Vasyutin (at Djurgårdens IF)

No.	Pos.	Nation	Player
—	GK	RUS	Nikita Goylo (at Akron Tolyatti)
—	FW	RUS	Kirill Makeyev (at BFC Daugavpils)

== Transfers ==
=== In ===
Date	Position	Nationality	Name	From	Fee	Ref.
27 July 2020	DF	(Croatia)	Dejan Lovren	Liverpool	Undisclosed	
6 October 2020	MF	(Brazil)	Wendel	Sporting CP	Undisclosed	
12 February 2021	FW	(Russia)	Pavel Dolgov	Tom Tomsk	Undisclosed	

=== Loans in ===
Date from	Position	Nationality	Name	To	Date to	Ref.
15 October 2020	DF	(Russia)	Dmitri Chistyakov	Rostov	End of season	
12 February 2021	MF	(Russia)	Nikita Koldunov	Sochi	End of season	

=== Out ===
Date	Position	Nationality	Name	To	Fee	Ref.
28 July 2020	DF	(Russia)	Nikita Kakkoyev	Nizhny Novgorod	Undisclosed	
28 July 2020	DF	(Russia)	Tomas Rukas	Yenisey Krasnoyarsk	Undisclosed	
28 July 2020	DF	(Russia)	Anton Sinyak	Tom Tomsk	Undisclosed	
31 July 2020	MF	(Brazil)	Hernani	Parma	Undisclosed	
6 October 2020	MF	(Argentina)	Emiliano Rigoni	Elche	Undisclosed	
15 October 2020	DF	(Russia)	Denis Terentyev	Rostov	Undisclosed	
29 January 2021	MF	(Russia)	Leon Musayev	Rubin Kazan	Undisclosed	

=== Loans out ===
Date from	Position	Nationality	Name	To	Date to	Ref.
28 July 2020	GK	(Russia)	Nikita Goylo	Akron Tolyatti	End of season	
28 July 2020	FW	(Russia)	Kirill Makeyev	BFC Daugavpils	End of season	
7 August 2020	DF	(Argentina)	Emanuel Mammana	Sochi	End of season	
11 February 2021	GK	(Russia)	Aleksandr Vasyutin	Djurgården	End of season	
22 February 2021	DF	(Russia)	Danila Prokhin	Sochi	End of season	

=== Released ===
Date	Position	Nationality	Name	Joined	Date	Ref.
28 July 2020	MF	(Russia)	Dmitry Bogayev	Zvezda St.Petersburg		
28 July 2020	FW	(Russia)	Aleksei Gasilin	Volgar Astrakhan	5 June 2020	
28 July 2020	MF	(Russia)	Dmitri Kirillov			
28 July 2020	MF	(Russia)	Maksim Levin	Zvezda St.Petersburg		
29 July 2020	DF	(Russia)	Igor Smolnikov	Krasnodar	29 July 2020	
29 July 2020	DF	(Serbia)	Branislav Ivanović	West Bromwich Albion	15 September 2020	
29 July 2020	MF	(Russia)	Oleg Shatov	Rubin Kazan	29 July 2020	
31 July 2020	MF	(Russia)	Daler Kuzyayev	Zenit St.Petersburg	6 October 2020	
31 July 2020	FW	(Russia)	Aleksandr Kokorin	Spartak Moscow	2 August 2020	
30 June 2021	GK	(Russia)	Andrey Lunyov	Bayer Leverkusen	10 July 2021	
30 June 2021	DF	(Russia)	Saba Sazonov	Dynamo Moscow	9 July 2021	
30 June 2021	DF	(Russia)	Sergei Chibisov	Yenisey Krasnoyarsk	1 July 2021	
30 June 2021	DF	(Russia)	Danila Prokhin	Rostov	1 July 2021	
30 June 2021	MF	(Russia)	Yuri Zhirkov	Khimki	12 January 2022	
30 June 2021	FW	(Russia)	Stanislav Krapukhin	Riga	18 August 2021	
30 June 2021	FW	(Russia)	Mikhail Pogorelov	Olimp-Dolgoprudny	9 July 2021	

== Friendlies ==
21 January 2021	Riga (Latvia)	0–4	(Russia) Zenit St.Petersburg	Dubai, United Arab Emirates
16:00 MSK (UTC+3)		Report	Driussi 35'; Wendel 36'; Mostovoy 84' (pen.); Krapukhin 90'	Stadium: Nad Al Sheba Stadium; Referee: Ahmed Zayed (United Arab Emirates)

24 January 2021	Pakhtakor Tashkent (Uzbekistan)	0–3	(Russia) Zenit St.Petersburg	Dubai, United Arab Emirates
10:00 MSK (UTC+3)		Report	Mostovoy 2', 57' (pen.); Krapukhin 17'; Sazonov (yellow card) 73'	Stadium: Nad Al Sheba Stadium

24 January 2021	Shakhtyor Soligorsk (Belarus)	0–2	(Russia) Zenit St.Petersburg	Dubai, United Arab Emirates
16:00 MSK (UTC+3)		Report	Kuzyayev 7'; Azmoun 33'	Stadium: Nad Al Sheba Stadium; Referee: Michal Okeanas (Slovakia)

27 January 2021	Ural Yekaterinburg	2–3	Zenit St.Petersburg	Dubai, United Arab Emirates
11:00 MSK (UTC+3)	Malcom 43'; Azmoun 49'; Wendel 57'	Report	Yegorychev 37', 46'	Stadium: Nad Al Sheba Stadium; Referee: Ivan Mladenovic (Serbia)

4 February 2021	Ararat-Armenia	0–4	(Russia) Zenit St.Petersburg	Dubai, United Arab Emirates
13:00 MSK (UTC+3)		Report	Sutormin 30' (pen.) (yellow card) 85'; Malcom 67', 71'; Wendel 81'	Stadium: Nad Al Sheba Stadium; Referee: Dusan Dimitrievich (Serbia)

4 February 2021	Noah (Armenia)	0–3	(Russia) Zenit St.Petersburg	Dubai, United Arab Emirates
16:00 MSK (UTC+3)		Report	Chistyakov 25'; Krapukhin 38'; M.Pogorelov 86'	Stadium: Nad Al Sheba Stadium

9 February 2021	Jordan	0–1	(Russia) Zenit St.Petersburg	Dubai, United Arab Emirates
MSK (UTC+3)		Report	Dzyuba 56'	Stadium: Nad Al Sheba Stadium; Referee: Dusan Dimitrievich (Serbia)

12 February 2021	Uzbekistan	0–4	(Russia) Zenit St.Petersburg	Dubai, United Arab Emirates
09:30 MSK (UTC+3)		Report		Stadium: Nad Al Sheba Stadium; Attendance: 0

12 February 2021	Pyunik (Armenia)	–	(Russia) Zenit St.Petersburg	Dubai, United Arab Emirates
MSK (UTC+3)				Stadium: Nad Al Sheba Stadium
Note: Match cancelled on 11 February.

== Competitions ==
Competition	First match	Last match	Starting round	Final position	Record							
Competition	First match	Last match	Starting round	Final position	Pld	W	D	L	GF	GA	GD	Win %
Premier League	11 August 2020	May 2021	Matchday 1	Winners	30	19	8	3	76	26	+50	63.33
Russian Cup	20 February 2021	20 February 2021	Round of 32	Round of 32	1	0	0	1	1	2	−1	0.00
Super Cup	7 August 2020		Final	Winners	1	1	0	0	2	1	+1	100.00
Champions League	20 October 2020	8 December 2020	Group stage	Group stage	6	0	1	5	4	13	−9	0.00
Total					38	20	9	9	83	42	+41	52.63

Last updated: 16 May 2021
Source: Competitions

=== Super Cup ===
7 August 2020	Zenit St.Petersburg	2–1	Lokomotiv Moscow	Moscow
19:00 MSK (UTC+3)	Dzyuba 14'; Driussi (yellow card) 59'; Ozdoyev (yellow card) 67' (goal) 69'; Zhirkov (yellow card) 84'; Azmoun (yellow card) 90+2'	Report	Rybus (yellow card) 19'; Magkeyev (yellow card) 48'; Al.Miranchuk (yellow card) 64'; Ćorluka 72'; Barinov (yellow card) 72'; An.Miranchuk (yellow card) 78'	Stadium: VEB Arena; Attendance: 5,942; Referee: Mikhail Vilkov

=== Premier League ===
==== League table ====
Pos	Team	Pld	W	D	L	GF	GA	GD	Pts	Qualification or relegation
1	Zenit Saint Petersburg (C)	30	19	8	3	76	26	+50	65	Qualification for the Champions League group stage
2	Spartak Moscow	30	17	6	7	56	37	+19	57	Qualification for the Champions League third qualifying round
3	Lokomotiv Moscow	30	17	5	8	45	35	+10	56	Qualification for the Europa League group stage (Note: FC Lokomotiv Moscow qualified for the Europa League group stage by winning the 2020–21 Russian Cup. The Europa Conference League spot awarded to the third-placed team is passed to fourth-placed team, and the spot awarded to the fourth-placed team is passed to fifth-placed team.)
4	Rubin Kazan	30	16	5	9	42	33	+9	53 (Note: Head-to-head points: Rubin 3, Sochi 3. Overall matches won: Rubin 16, Sochi 15.)	Qualification for the Europa Conference League third qualifying round
5	Sochi	30	15	8	7	49	33	+16	53	Qualification for the Europa Conference League second qualifying round

Source: Premier Liga
Rules for classification: 1) Points; 2) Head-to-head points; 3) Head-to-head matches won; 4) Head-to-head goal difference; 5) Head-to-head goals scored; 6) Matches won; 7) Goal difference; 8) Goals scored; 9) Play-off.
(C) Champions

==== Results summary ====
Overall								Home						Away					
Pld	W	D	L	GF	GA	GD	Pts	W	D	L	GF	GA	GD	W	D	L	GF	GA	GD
30	19	8	3	76	26	+50	65	13	1	1	53	13	+40	6	7	2	23	13	+10

Last updated: 16 May 2021.
Source: See Results

==== Results by round ====
Round	1	2	3	4	5	6	7	8	9	10	11	12	13	14	15	16	17	18	19	20	21	22	23	24	25	26	27	28	29	30
Ground	A	A	H	H	A	A	H	A	H	A	H	H	A	H	A	A	H	H	H	H	A	H	A	H	A	A	H	H	A	A
Result	W	W	W	W	L	D	W	D	W	D	W	L	W	W	D	D	W	W	W	D	L	W	W	W	W	D	W	W	D	W
Position	2	1	1	1	1	2	1	1	1	1	1	2	2	2	2	1	1	1	1	1	1	1	1	1	1	1	1	1	1	1

Updated to match(es) played on 16 May 2021. Source: Premier Liga
A = Away; H = Home; W = Win; D = Draw; L = Loss

==== Results ====
11 August 2020 1	Rotor Volgograd	0–2	Zenit St.Petersburg	Volgograd
18:00 MSK (UTC+3)	Stepanov (yellow card) 49'	Report	Dzyuba 22'; Karavayev (yellow card) 41'; Driussi 79'	Stadium: Volgograd Arena; Attendance: 12,438; Referee: Aleksei Matyunin

15 August 2020 2	Rostov	0–2	Zenit St.Petersburg	Rostov-on-Don
20:00 MSK (UTC+3)	Normann (yellow card) 3'; Chernov (yellow card) 23'	Report	Malcom (yellow card) 1'; Azmoun (penalty missed) 24' 24' (yellow card) 70'; Rakitskiy (yellow card) 55' (yellow-red card) 78'; Lovren 87'; Barrios (yellow card) 90+'	Stadium: Rostov Arena; Attendance: 11,353; Referee: 11,353

19 August 2020 3	Zenit St.Petersburg	2–1	CSKA Moscow	Saint Petersburg
20:00 MSK (UTC+3)	Azmoun 19', 69' (yellow card) 59'	Report	Maradishvili (yellow card) 24'; Vlašić 26' (yellow card) 33'; Diveyev (yellow card) 34'; Oblyakov (yellow card) 90+4'	Stadium: Krestovsky Stadium; Attendance: 28,602; Referee: Vitali Meshkov

22 August 2020 4	Zenit St.Petersburg	4–1	Tambov	Saint Petersburg
18:00 MSK (UTC+3)	Driussi (yellow card) 21'; Douglas 41'; Malcom 47'; Yerokhin 68'; Azmoun 74'	Report	Chicherin (yellow card) 5'; Kabakhidze (yellow card) 65'; Panchenko 85'	Stadium: Krestovsky Stadium; Attendance: 20,782; Referee: Igor Panin

26 August 2020 5	Dynamo Moscow	1–0	Zenit St.Petersburg	Moscow
20:45 MSK (UTC+3)	Šunjić 40'; Szymański (yellow card) 53'; Parshivlyuk (yellow card) 66'; Skopintsev (red card) 73'; Moro (yellow card) 79'; Pliyev (yellow card) 85'; Yevgenyev (yellow card) 87'; Kaboré (yellow card) 89'; Shunin (yellow card) 90+'	Report	Karavayev (yellow card) 39'; Barrios (yellow card) 49' (yellow-red card) 83'; Rigoni (yellow card) 90+'; Lovren (yellow card) FT	Stadium: VTB Arena; Attendance: 5,885; Referee: Stanislav Vasiliev

30 August 2020 6	Lokomotiv Moscow	0–0	Zenit St.Petersburg	Moscow
16:00 MSK (UTC+3)	Rybus (yellow card) 26'; Ćorluka (yellow card) 85'; Zhemaletdinov (yellow card) 87'	Report		Stadium: RZD Arena; Attendance: 7,739; Referee: Vladimir Moskalyov

14 September 2020 7	Zenit St.Petersburg	3–1	Arsenal Tula	Saint Petersburg
18:30 MSK (UTC+3)	Mostovoy 25'; Dzyuba 31'; Barrios (yellow card) 37'; Yerokhin 87'	Report	Burlak (yellow card) 21'; Khlusevich (yellow card) 45+'; Kavalyow 60'; Tkachyov (yellow card) 79'	Stadium: Krestovsky Stadium; Attendance: 21,559; Referee: Pavel Kukuyan

19 September 2020 8	Ural Yekaterinburg	1–1	Zenit St.Petersburg	Yekaterinburg
16:30 MSK (UTC+3)	Miškić (yellow card) 19'; Zolotov (yellow card) 40'; Panyukov 69'	Report	Dzyuba 4'; Ozdoyev (yellow card) 44'	Stadium: Central Stadium; Attendance: 13,488; Referee: Sergei Karasev

26 September 2020 9	Zenit St.Petersburg	6–0	Ufa	Saint Petersburg
16:30 MSK (UTC+3)	Azmoun 24', 61'; Dzyuba 32' (pen.), 72', 88'; Yerokhin (yellow card) 63'; Sutormin 90+'	Report	Nedelcearu (yellow card) 29'	Stadium: Krestovsky Stadium; Attendance: 22,697; Referee: Alexey Sukhoi

3 October 2020 10	Spartak Moscow	1–1	Zenit St.Petersburg	Moscow
19:00 MSK (UTC+3)	Sobolev (yellow card) 59'; Ponce 86'; Yeshchenko (yellow card) 90'	Report	Douglas (yellow card) 37'; Yerokhin 65'; Barrios (yellow card) 88'; Lovren (yellow card) 89'	Stadium: Otkritie Arena; Attendance: 17,150; Referee: Pavel Kukuyan

17 October 2020 11	Zenit St.Petersburg	3–1	Sochi	Saint Petersburg
14:00 MSK (UTC+3)	Karavayev 16'; Yerokhin 24'; Rakitskiy (yellow card) 33'; Douglas 90+'	Report	Mammana (yellow card) 23'; Zaika 57' (yellow card) 73'; Yusupov (yellow card) 90+'	Stadium: Krestovsky Stadium; Attendance: 21,231; Referee: Sergey Ivanov

24 October 2020 12	Zenit St.Petersburg	1–2	Rubin Kazan	Saint Petersburg
16:30 MSK (UTC+3)	Yerokhin 26'; Kuzyayev (yellow card) 87'; Rakitskiy (yellow card) 90+'	Report	Uremović (yellow card) 25'; Despotović 43'; Jevtić 69'	Stadium: Krestovsky Stadium; Attendance: 20,847; Referee: Nikolay Voloshin

1 November 2020 13	Khimki	0–2	Zenit St.Petersburg	Khimki
14:00 MSK (UTC+3)	Idowu (yellow card) 82'	Report	Mostovoy 18'; Sutormin (yellow card) 27'; Yerokhin (yellow card) 37' (goal) 78'; Zhirkov (yellow card) 61'	Stadium: Arena Khimki; Referee: Aleksei Matyunin

8 November 2020 14	Zenit St.Petersburg	3–1	Krasnodar	Saint Petersburg
19:00 MSK (UTC+3)	Wendel (yellow card) 13'; Dzyuba (penalty missed) 45' 79'; Kuzyayev 65' (yellow card) 88'; Sutormin 90+'	Report	Berg 17' (pen.) (yellow card) 30'; Kaio (yellow card) 84'	Stadium: Krestovsky Stadium; Attendance: 24,068; Referee: Vladimir Moskalyov

21 November 2020 15	Akhmat Grozny	1–1	Zenit St.Petersburg	Grozny
16:30 MSK (UTC+3)	Berisha 26', 53' (pen.)	Report	Kuzyayev 16'; Lovren 48'; Chistyakov (yellow card) 52'; Rakitskiy (yellow card) 55' (yellow-red card) 90+'	Stadium: Akhmat-Arena; Attendance: 6,241; Referee: Sergei Karasev

28 November 2020 16	Arsenal Tula	0–0	Zenit St.Petersburg	Tula
14:00 MSK (UTC+3)	Lomovitsky (yellow card) 37'; K.Kangwa (yellow card) 39'; Kostadinov (yellow card) 72'; Panchenko (yellow card) 90+'	Report	Barrios (yellow card) 90+'	Stadium: Arsenal Stadium; Attendance: 1,916; Referee: Evgeny Kukulyak

5 December 2020 17	Zenit St.Petersburg	5–1	Ural Yekaterinburg	Saint Petersburg
19:00 MSK (UTC+3)	Azmoun 17', 22', 76' (pen.); Dzyuba 30' (pen.); Douglas 45'	Report	Augustyniak (yellow card) 32'; Magomadov (yellow card) 75'; Shabolin 82'	Stadium: Krestovsky Stadium; Attendance: 1,184; Referee: Igor Panin

12 December 2020 18	Zenit St.Petersburg	3–1	Dynamo Moscow	Saint Petersburg
19:00 MSK (UTC+3)	Dzyuba 14', 34' (pen.); Ozdoyev (yellow card) 55'; Azmoun 84'; Chistyakov (yellow card) 90+'	Report	Parshivlyuk (yellow card) 34'; Komlichenko 56' (pen.) (yellow card) 81'	Stadium: Krestovsky Stadium; Attendance: 1,909; Referee: Sergey Ivanov

16 December 2020 19	Zenit St.Petersburg	3–1	Spartak Moscow	Saint Petersburg
20:00 MSK (UTC+3)	Azmoun 8'; Malcom (yellow card) 39'; Rakitskiy 74'; Sutormin (yellow card) 78'; Barrios (yellow card) 83'; Dzyuba 90+'	Report	Zobnin (yellow card) 25'; Larsson (yellow card) 36'; Dzhikiya (yellow card) 54'; Lovren 67' (o.g.)	Stadium: Krestovsky Stadium; Attendance: 1,993; Referee: Sergei Karasev

27 February 2021 20	Zenit St.Petersburg	2–2	Rostov	Saint Petersburg
16:30 MSK (UTC+3)	Lovren (yellow card) 54'; Kuzyayev (yellow card) 61' (goal) 78'; Poyarkov 73' (o.g.)	Report	Normann (yellow card) 16'; Poyarkov (yellow card) 18'; Sowe (yellow card) 29' (goal) 44', 89'; Almqvist (yellow card) 45+'; Osipenko (red card) 56'; Bayramyan (yellow card) 77'	Stadium: Krestovsky Stadium; Attendance: 23,165; Referee: Aleksei Matyunin

8 March 2021 21	Rubin Kazan	2–1	Zenit St.Petersburg	Kazan
16:30 MSK (UTC+3)	Despotović 41' (pen.); Zuyev (yellow card) 83'; Makarov 90+'	Report	Azmoun 75'; Lovren (yellow card) 77'; Dzyuba (penalty missed) 90+'	Stadium: Ak Bars Arena; Attendance: 9,211; Referee: Sergei Karasev

13 March 2021 22	Zenit St.Petersburg	4–0	Akhmat Grozny	Saint Petersburg
16:30 MSK (UTC+3)	Douglas (yellow card) 36'; Karavayev 52'; Azmoun 65' (pen.); Rakitskiy (yellow card) 67'; Dzyuba 74'; Mostovoy 80'	Report	Berisha (yellow card) 62'; Putsko (yellow card) 64'; Semyonov (yellow card) 65'	Stadium: Krestovsky Stadium; Attendance: 22,551; Referee: Vitali Meshkov

17 March 2021 23	CSKA Moscow	2–3	Zenit St.Petersburg	Moscow
20:00 MSK (UTC+3)	Rondón 28'; Akinfeev (yellow card) 45'; Akhmetov (red card) 53'; Vlašić 90+'	Report	Dzyuba 33' (penalty missed) 45; Wendel 50', 77'	Stadium: VEB Arena; Attendance: 11,275; Referee: Evgeny Kukulyak

5 April 2021 24	Zenit St.Petersburg	2–0	Khimki	Saint Petersburg
19:00 MSK (UTC+3)	Lovren (yellow card) 10'; Karavayev 45+'; Azmoun (yellow card) 86'; Mostovoy 90+'	Report	Idowu (yellow card) 66'	Stadium: Krestovsky Stadium; Attendance: 20,708; Referee: Pavel Shadykhanov

11 April 2021 25	Sochi	1–2	Zenit St.Petersburg	Sochi
16:30 MSK (UTC+3)	Prokhin (yellow card) 38'; Burmistrov 58'; Rudenko (yellow card) 85'; Miladinović (yellow card) 90+'	Report	Barrios (yellow card) 42'; Azmoun 63', 80'	Stadium: Fisht Olympic Stadium; Attendance: 9,328; Referee: Vladimir Moskalyov

17 April 2021 26	Krasnodar	2–2	Zenit St.Petersburg	Krasnodar
19:00 MSK (UTC+3)	Ionov 7', 61'; Olsson (yellow card) 54'; Chernov (yellow card) 71'; Claesson (yellow card) 89'	Report	Chistyakov (yellow card) 44'; Azmoun 75' (yellow card) 90+'; Mostovoy 86'	Stadium: Krasnodar Stadium; Attendance: 17,590; Referee: Sergey Ivanov

24 April 2021 27	Zenit St.Petersburg	6–0	Rotor Volgograd	Saint Petersburg
16:30 MSK (UTC+3)	Kvirkvelia 45+'; Malcom 56'; Mostovoy 65'; Dzyuba 75'; Yerokhin 77'; Sutormin 87' (yellow card) 90'	Report		Stadium: Krestovsky Stadium; Attendance: 24,807; Referee: Vitali Meshkov

2 May 2021 28	Zenit St.Petersburg	6 – 1	Lokomotiv Moscow	Saint Petersburg
19:00 MSK (UTC+3)	Dzyuba 19', 51'; Rakitskiy (yellow card) 36'; Azmoun 39', 45+' (pen.), 46'; Malcom 67'; Kuzyayev (yellow card) 69'	Report	Krychowiak (yellow card) 22'; Mukhin (yellow card) 38'; Pablo (yellow card) 45+'; Kamano 56'; Miranchuk (yellow card) 61'; Rybchinsky (yellow card) 87'	Stadium: Krestovsky Stadium; Attendance: 39,793; Referee: Sergei Karasev

8 May 2021 29	Ufa	0 – 0	Zenit St.Petersburg	Ufa
14:00 MSK (UTC+3)	Pliyev (yellow card) 80'; Belenov (yellow card) 90+'	Report	Azmoun (penalty missed) 45+'; Barrios (yellow card) 81'; Khotulyov (yellow card) 84'	Stadium: Neftyanik Stadium; Attendance: 9,660; Referee: Vladimir Moskalyov

16 May 2021 30	Tambov	1 – 5	Zenit St.Petersburg	Saransk
14:00 MSK (UTC+3)	Klimov 45'	Report	Dzyuba 11', 55', 72', 74'; Ozdoyev (yellow card) 45+'; Vosiyev 90+' (o.g.)	Stadium: Mordovia Arena; Attendance: 7,119; Referee: Anton Frolov

=== Russian Cup ===
20 February 2021 Round of 16	Zenit St.Petersburg	1–2	Arsenal Tula	Saint Petersburg
17:00 MSK (UTC+3)	Kuzyayev 19'; Rakitskiy (yellow card) 24'; Krapukhin (yellow card) 86'; Ozdoyev (yellow card) 89'	Report	Panchenko 25' (yellow card) 71'; Bauer (yellow card) 27' (goal) 37' (pen.); E.Kangwa (yellow card) 76'; Grigalava (yellow card) 89'	Stadium: Krestovsky Stadium; Attendance: 18,463; Referee: Stanislav Vasilyev

=== UEFA Champions League ===
==== Group stage ====
Pos	Team	Pld	W	D	L	GF	GA	GD	Pts	Qualification
1	(Germany) Borussia Dortmund	6	4	1	1	12	5	+7	13	Advance to knockout phase
2	(Italy) Lazio	6	2	4	0	11	7	+4	10	Advance to knockout phase
3	(Belgium) Club Brugge	6	2	2	2	8	10	−2	8	Transfer to Europa League
4	(Russia) Zenit Saint Petersburg	6	0	1	5	4	13	−9	1	

Source: UEFA
Rules for classification: Group stage tiebreakers

20 October 2020 1	Zenit St.Petersburg (Russia)	1–2	(Belgium) Club Brugge	Saint Petersburg, Russia
19:55 MSK (UTC+3)	Lovren (yellow card) 53'; Horvath 74' (o.g.)	Report	Mata (yellow card) 12'; Dennis (yellow card) 14' (goal) 63'; Rits (yellow card) 33'; Vanaken (yellow card) 85'; De Ketelaere 90+3'	Stadium: Krestovsky Stadium; Attendance: 16,682; Referee: Benoît Bastien (France)

28 October 2020 2	Borussia Dortmund (Germany)	2–0	(Russia) Zenit St.Petersburg	Dortmund, Germany
23:00 MSK (UTC+3)	Sancho 78' (pen.); Haaland 90+1'	Report	Kuzyayev (yellow card) 25'; Karavayev (yellow card) 78'	Stadium: Westfalenstadion; Attendance: 0 Referee: Björn Kuipers (Netherlands)

4 November 2020 3	Zenit St.Petersburg (Russia)	1–1	(Italy) Lazio	Saint Petersburg, Russia
20:55 MSK (UTC+3)	Kuzyayev (yellow card) 7'; Yerokhin 32'; Barrios (yellow card) 78'; Lovren (yellow card) 85'; Krugovoy (yellow card) 86'	Report	Akpa Akpro (yellow card) 5'; Milinković-Savić (yellow card) 59'; Caicedo (yellow card) 78' (goal) 82'; Reina (yellow card) 85'	Stadium: Krestovsky Stadium; Attendance: 17,427; Referee: Artur Soares Dias (Portugal)

24 November 2020 4	Lazio (Italy)	3–1	(Russia) Zenit St.Petersburg	Rome, Italy
23:00 MSK (UTC+3)	Immobile 3', 55' (pen.); Parolo 22'; Acerbi (yellow card) 89'	Report	Dzyuba 25'; Barrios (yellow card) 38'; Lovren (yellow card) 48'; Rakitskiy (yellow card) 76'	Stadium: Stadio Olimpico; Attendance: 0 Referee: Michael Oliver (England)

2 December 2020 4	Club Brugge (Belgium)	3–0	(Russia) Zenit St.Petersburg	Bruges, Belgium
23:00 MSK (UTC+3)	De Ketelaere 33'; Vanaken 58' (pen.); Lang 73'	Report	Sutormin (yellow card) 67'; Prokhin (yellow card) 90'	Stadium: Jan Breydel Stadium; Attendance: 0 Referee: Serdar Gözübüyük (Netherlands)

8 December 2020 6	Zenit St.Petersburg (Russia)	1–2	(Germany) Borussia Dortmund	Saint Petersburg, Russia
20:55 MSK (UTC+3)	Azmoun (yellow card) 10'; Driussi 16'	Report	Piszczek 68'; Witsel 79'	Stadium: Krestovsky Stadium; Attendance: 10,860; Referee: István Kovács (Romania)

== Squad statistics ==
As of match played 16 May 2021

=== Appearances and goals ===
No.	Pos	Nat	Player	Total		Premier League		Russian Cup		Super Cup		Champions League	
No.	Pos	Nat	Player	Apps	Goals	Apps	Goals	Apps	Goals	Apps	Goals	Apps	Goals
2	DF	(Russia) RUS	Dmitri Chistyakov	14	0	9+5	0	0	0	0	0	0	0
3	DF	(Brazil) BRA	Douglas Santos	34	3	28	3	0	0	1	0	5	0
4	DF	(Russia) RUS	Danil Krugovoy	24	0	5+14	0	0+1	0	0	0	1+3	0
5	MF	(Colombia) COL	Wílmar Barrios	33	0	26	0	0	0	1	0	6	0
6	DF	(Croatia) CRO	Dejan Lovren	28	2	21	2	1	0	1	0	4+1	0
7	FW	(Iran) IRI	Sardar Azmoun	29	19	21+3	19	0	0	1	0	3+1	0
8	FW	(Brazil) BRA	Malcom	25	3	20+1	3	0	0	1	0	3	0
11	FW	(Argentina) ARG	Sebastián Driussi	22	2	11+5	1	0	0	1	0	4+1	1
14	MF	(Russia) RUS	Daler Kuzyayev	25	4	14+4	3	1	1	0	0	6	0
15	DF	(Russia) RUS	Vyacheslav Karavayev	31	3	25	3	1	0	1	0	3+1	0
17	MF	(Russia) RUS	Andrei Mostovoy	33	6	8+18	6	1	0	0+1	0	1+4	0
18	MF	(Russia) RUS	Yuri Zhirkov	20	0	7+8	0	1	0	0+1	0	2+1	0
19	MF	(Russia) RUS	Aleksei Sutormin	32	3	9+17	3	1	0	0	0	2+3	0
20	MF	(Brazil) BRA	Wendel	20	2	13+2	2	1	0	0	0	1+3	0
21	MF	(Russia) RUS	Aleksandr Yerokhin	32	8	9+16	7	0+1	0	0+1	0	4+1	1
22	FW	(Russia) RUS	Artem Dzyuba	34	22	26+1	20	1	0	1	1	4+1	1
27	MF	(Russia) RUS	Magomed Ozdoyev	35	1	21+7	0	1	0	1	1	3+2	0
36	FW	(Russia) RUS	Stanislav Krapukhin	4	0	0+3	0	0+1	0	0	0	0	0
41	GK	(Russia) RUS	Mikhail Kerzhakov	25	0	18	0	0	0	1	0	6	0
44	DF	(Ukraine) UKR	Yaroslav Rakitskiy	32	1	24	1	1	0	1	0	6	0
54	DF	(Russia) RUS	Saba Sazonov	1	0	0+1	0	0	0	0	0	0	0
75	DF	(Russia) RUS	Sergei Chibisov	1	0	0+1	0	0	0	0	0	0	0
64	MF	(Russia) RUS	Kirill Kravtsov	4	0	0+4	0	0	0	0	0	0	0
71	GK	(Russia) RUS	Daniil Odoyevskiy	1	0	1	0	0	0	0	0	0	0
87	DF	(Russia) RUS	Danila Prokhin	7	0	1+4	0	0	0	0	0	2	0
92	FW	(Russia) RUS	Daniil Shamkin	5	0	0+3	0	0	0	0	0	0+2	0
94	DF	(Russia) RUS	Danila Khotulyov	4	0	1+3	0	0	0	0	0	0	0
99	GK	(Russia) RUS	Andrey Lunyov	13	0	11+1	0	1	0	0	0	0	0
Players away from the club on loan:
Players who left Zenit during the season:
10	MF	(Argentina) ARG	Emiliano Rigoni	8	0	1+6	0	0	0	0+1	0	0	0
34	DF	(Russia) RUS	Denis Terentyev	1	0	0+1	0	0	0	0	0	0	0
38	MF	(Russia) RUS	Leon Musayev	6	0	0+3	0	0	0	0+1	0	0+2	0

=== Goal scorers ===
Place	Position	Nation	Number	Name	Premier League	Russian Cup	Super Cup	Champions League	Total
1	FW	(Russia)	22	Artem Dzyuba	20	0	1	1	22
2	FW	(Iran)	7	Sardar Azmoun	19	0	0	0	19
3	MF	(Russia)	21	Aleksandr Yerokhin	7	0	0	1	8
4	MF	(Russia)	17	Andrei Mostovoy	6	0	0	0	6
5	MF	(Russia)	14	Daler Kuzyayev	3	1	0	0	4
5				Own goal	3	0	0	1	4
7	DF	(Brazil)	3	Douglas Santos	3	0	0	0	3
7	DF	(Russia)	15	Vyacheslav Karavayev	3	0	0	0	3
7	FW	(Brazil)	8	Malcom	3	0	0	0	3
10	MF	(Russia)	19	Aleksei Sutormin	3	0	0	0	3
10	DF	(Croatia)	6	Dejan Lovren	2	0	0	0	2
10	MF	(Brazil)	20	Wendel	2	0	0	0	2
10	FW	(Argentina)	11	Sebastián Driussi	1	0	0	1	2
14	DF	(Ukraine)	44	Yaroslav Rakitskiy	1	0	0	0	1
14	MF	(Russia)	27	Magomed Ozdoyev	0	0	1	0	1
				TOTALS	76	1	2	4	83

=== Clean sheets ===
Place	Position	Nation	Number	Name	Premier League	Russian Cup	Super Cup	Champions League	Total
1	GK	(Russia)	41	Mikhail Kerzhakov	7	0	0	0	7
2	GK	(Russia)	99	Andrey Lunyov	3	0	0	0	3
				TOTALS	10	0	0	0	10

=== Disciplinary record ===
Number	Nation	Position	Name	Premier League		Russian Cup		Super Cup		Champions League		Total	
Number	Nation	Position	Name	Yellow card	Red card	Yellow card	Red card	Yellow card	Red card	Yellow card	Red card	Yellow card	Red card
2	(Russia)	DF	Dmitri Chistyakov	3	0	0	0	0	0	0	0	3	0
3	(Brazil)	DF	Douglas Santos	2	0	0	0	0	0	0	0	2	0
4	(Russia)	DF	Danil Krugovoy	0	0	0	0	0	0	1	0	1	0
5	(Colombia)	MF	Wílmar Barrios	9	1	0	0	0	0	2	0	11	1
6	(Croatia)	DF	Dejan Lovren	5	0	0	0	0	0	3	0	8	0
7	(Iran)	FW	Sardar Azmoun	4	0	0	0	1	0	1	0	6	0
8	(Brazil)	FW	Malcom	2	0	0	0	0	0	0	0	2	0
11	(Argentina)	FW	Sebastián Driussi	1	0	0	0	1	0	0	0	2	0
14	(Russia)	MF	Daler Kuzyayev	4	0	0	0	0	0	2	0	6	0
15	(Russia)	DF	Vyacheslav Karavayev	2	0	0	0	0	0	1	0	3	0
18	(Russia)	MF	Yuri Zhirkov	1	0	0	0	1	0	0	0	2	0
19	(Russia)	MF	Aleksei Sutormin	3	0	0	0	0	0	1	0	4	0
20	(Brazil)	MF	Wendel	1	0	0	0	0	0	0	0	1	0
21	(Russia)	MF	Aleksandr Yerokhin	2	0	0	0	0	0	0	0	2	0
27	(Russia)	MF	Magomed Ozdoyev	3	0	1	0	1	0	0	0	5	0
36	(Russia)	FW	Stanislav Krapukhin	0	0	1	0	0	0	0	0	1	0
44	(Ukraine)	DF	Yaroslav Rakitskiy	8	2	1	0	0	0	1	0	10	2
87	(Russia)	DF	Danila Prokhin	0	0	0	0	0	0	1	0	1	0
94	(Russia)	DF	Danila Khotulyov	1	0	0	0	0	0	0	0	1	0
Players away on loan:
Players who left Zenit during the season:
10	(Argentina)	MF	Emiliano Rigoni	1	0	0	0	0	0	0	0	1	0
			TOTALS	52	3	3	0	4	0	13	0	72	3
