= 2019 Granatkin Memorial =

Tournament details
- Host country: Russia
- City: Saint Petersburg
- Dates: 4 to 14 June 2019
- Teams: 12 (from 3 confederations)
- Venue: 3 (in 1 host city)

Tournament statistics
- Matches played: 24
- Goals scored: 65 (2.71 per match)
- Top scorer(s): (Russia) Kirill Kosarev (4 goals)
- All statistics correct as of 12 June 2019.

The 2019 Valentin Granatkin Memorial Cup is its 19th edition after dissolution of the USSR. The tournament was held at Saint Petersburg, Russia from 4 to 14 June 2019, being organised by Russian Football Union.

== Participating nations ==
Total of 12 National U-18 teams from three different confederations namely AFC, CONMEBOL and UEFA, participated in this edition of the tournament. The teams are further divided in three different groups, where Group A have Bulgaria, India, Moldova and host Russia, Group B have Kyrgyzstan, Kazakhstan, Turkey and Greece and Group C have Argentina, Iran, Armenia and second team of host Russia as Russia 2.

== Group stage ==
- All times are Further-eastern European Time (UTC+03:00).

The participants will play each other in each group and the winners of each group and the best of the teams finished second in each group will play for the semifinals. The remaining teams will play for 5–8 places.

=== Group A ===
Team	Pld	W	D	L	GF	GA	GD	Pts
Russia	3	3	0	0	7	0	+7	9
Moldova	3	1	1	1	2	2	0	4
Bulgaria	3	0	2	1	1	4	−3	2
India	3	0	1	2	2	6	−4	1

Source: RFS Granatkin
4 June 2019
12:00

Bulgaria	0–0	Moldova
	BFU FMF

Petrovsky Stadium, Saint Petersburg
Attendance: 300
Referee: Jan Bobrovsky (Russia)
4 June 2019
18:00

Russia	3–0	India
Kosarev 50', 73', 82'	RFS AIFF

Petrovsky Stadium, Saint Petersburg
Attendance: 500
Referee: Dmitry Streltsov (Russia)

6 June 2019
12:00

Moldova	2–1	India
Puşcaş 54'; Gaiu 56' (pen.)	FMF AIFF	Danu 34'

Petrovsky Stadium, Saint Petersburg
Attendance: 250
Referee: Yunus Koshko (Russia)
6 June 2019
18:00

Russia	3–0	Bulgaria
Prokhin 44', 54'; Fayzullin 57'	RFS BFU

Petrovsky Stadium, Saint Petersburg
Attendance: 1000
Referee: Artyom Chistyakov (Russia)

9 June 2019
12:00

India	1–1	Bulgaria
Mishra 50'	AIFF BFU	Rafi 7' (o.g.)

Petrovsky Stadium, Saint Petersburg
Attendance: 100
Referee: Oleg Sokolov (Russia)
9 June 2019
18:00

Moldova	0–1	Russia
	FMF RFS	Petrov 9'

Petrovsky Stadium, Saint Petersburg
Attendance: 400
Referee: Evgeny Bulanov (Russia)

=== Group B ===
Team	Pld	W	D	L	GF	GA	GD	Pts
Turkey	3	2	1	0	6	0	+6	7
Greece	3	1	2	0	8	5	+3	5
Tajikistan	3	0	2	1	5	10	−5	2
Kyrgyzstan	3	0	1	2	2	6	−4	1

Source: RFS Granatkin
5 June 2019
12:00

Greece	4–4	Tajikistan
Thymianis 10'; Michelis 42'; Tzimas 44'; Tsakiris 66'	RFS FFT	Rahmatov 34'; Soirov 63' (pen.), 70'; Zairov 67'

Stadium Turbostroitel, Saint Petersburg
Attendance: 300
Referee: Andrey Fissenko (Russia)
5 June 2019
19:00

Turkey	1–0	Kyrgyzstan
Arslantas 40'	RFS TFF

Stadium Turbostroitel, Saint Petersburg
Attendance: 300
Referee: Evgeny Bulanov (Russia)

7 June 2019
12:00

Tajikistan	1–1	Kyrgyzstan
Kamolov 90+3'	FFT RFS	Shigaibaev 25'

Stadium Turbostroitel, Saint Petersburg
Attendance: 350
Referee: Konstantin Averyanov (Russia)
7 June 2019
19:00

Turkey	0–0	Greece
	RFS TFF

Stadium Turbostroitel, Saint Petersburg
Attendance: 250
Referee: Artem Petrenko (Russia)

10 June 2019
12:00

Kyrgyzstan	1–4	Greece
Artykbaev 72'	RFS	Vrakas 17' (pen.), 49'; Tzimas 27'; Pournaras 29'

Stadium Turbostroitel, Saint Petersburg
Attendance: 300
Referee: Maksim Matyunin (Russia)
10 June 2019
19:00

Tajikistan	0–5	Turkey
	RFS TFF	İşler 15'; Akgün 39', 41'; Yeşilay 56'; Arslantas 90+1'

Stadium Turbostroitel, Saint Petersburg
Attendance: 450
Referee: Jan Bobrovsky (Russia)

=== Group C ===
Team	Pld	W	D	L	GF	GA	GD	Pts
Argentina	3	3	0	0	8	3	+5	9
Russia 2	3	2	0	1	5	3	+2	6
Iran	3	1	0	2	5	6	−1	3
Armenia	3	0	0	3	0	6	−6	0

Source: RFS Granatkin
5 June 2019
12:00

Argentina	2–0	Armenia
Orozco 56'; Palacios 60'	AFA FFA

Roshchino Arena, Saint Petersburg
Attendance: 400
Referee: Oleg Sokolov (Russia)
5 June 2019
19:00

Russia 2	2–1	Iran
Iosifov 56' (pen.), 65'	RFS FFIRI	Sobhani 88'

Roshchino Arena, Saint Petersburg
Attendance: 550
Referee: Maksim Matyunin (Russia)

7 June 2019
12:00

Armenia	0–2	Iran
	FFA FFIRI	Sobhani 25'; Jalali 34'

Roshchino Arena, Saint Petersburg
Attendance: 300
Referee: Andrey Fissenko (Russia)
7 June 2019
19:00

Russia 2	1–2	Argentina
Iosifov 13'	RFS AFA	Orozco 76'; Lecanda 78'

Roshchino Arena, Saint Petersburg
Attendance: 1,200
Referee: Sergey Kulikov (Russia)

9 June 2019
12:00

Iran	2–4	Argentina
Barzegar 14'; Moharrami 89'	FFIRI AFA	Zeballos 39' (pen.); Godoy 78'; Medina 84'; Cano 88'

Roshchino Arena, Saint Petersburg
Attendance: 300
Referee: Dmitry Streltsov (Russia)
9 June 2019
19:00

Armenia	0–2	Russia 2
	FFA RFS	Apshatsev 7'; Petukhov 90+1'

Roshchino Arena, Saint Petersburg
Attendance: 600
Referee: Andrey Fissenko (Russia)

== Placement matches ==
=== Places 9–12 ===
11 June 2019
12:00

Kyrgyzstan	1–1	India
Shigaibaev 88'	RFS AIFF	Mishra 75'
Penalties
Artykbaev (penalty scored); Kanybekov (penalty scored); Rusakov (penalty scored)	3–1	Rohit Danu (penalty scored); H.Singh (penalty missed); Sailo (penalty missed); J.Singh (penalty missed)

Stadium Turbostroitel, Saint Petersburg
Attendance: 300
Referee: Artem Petrenko (Russia)
11 June 2019
19:00

Tajikistan	0–3	Armenia
	RFS FFA	Alaverdyan 35'; Grigoryan 45'; Kolozyan 53'

Roshchino Arena, Saint Petersburg
Attendance: 350
Referee: Ilya Ivanov (Russia)

==== 11th Place ====
13 June 2019
12:00

India	0–1	Tajikistan
	AIFF RFS	Panzhiev 39'

Stadium Turbostroitel, Saint Petersburg
Attendance: 300
Referee: Jan Bobrovsky (Russia)

==== 9th Place ====
13 June 2019
12:00

Kyrgyzstan	0–3	Armenia
	RFS	Petrosyan 21', 50'; Avetisyan 23'

Roshchino Arena, Saint Petersburg
Attendance: 300
Referee: Oleg Sokolov (Russia)

=== Places 5–8 ===
11 June 2019
12:00

Moldova	1–2	Iran
Ghiderman 39'	FMF RFS	Barzegar 55'; Sobhani 90+1'

Roshchino Arena, Saint Petersburg
Attendance: 400
Referee: Artyom Chistyakov (Russia)
11 June 2019
19:00

Greece	2–0	Bulgaria
Fakkis 10'; Tzimas 33'	RFS

Stadium Turbostroitel, Saint Petersburg
Attendance: 300
Referee: Konstantin Averyanov (Russia)

==== 7th Place ====
13 June 2019
12:00

Moldova	1–1	Bulgaria
Dolghi 90' (pen.)	RFS	Petkov 80'
Penalties
	3–4

Stadium Turbostroitel, Saint Petersburg
Attendance: 300
Referee: Artem Petrenko (Russia)

==== 5th Place ====
13 June 2019
12:00

Iran	0–1	Greece
		Tzimas 81'

Roshchino Arena, Saint Petersburg

=== Semifinals ===
12 June 2019
12:00

Argentina	2–0	Turkey
Lecanda 28'; Palacios 65' (pen.)	RFS

Petrovsky Stadium, Saint Petersburg
Attendance: 700
Referee: Yunus Koshko (Russia)
12 June 2019
18:00

Russia	1–1	Russia 2
Kosarev 30'	RFS	Pelikh 15'
Penalties
Litvinov (penalty scored); Gerchikov (penalty scored); Suleymanov (penalty scored); Oganesyan (penalty scored); Vladimirov (penalty scored)	5–3	Petukhov (penalty scored); Joseph (penalty missed); Zakharov (penalty scored); Bem (penalty scored)

Petrovsky Stadium, Saint Petersburg
Referee: Sergey Kulikov (Russia)

=== Third place ===
14 June 2019
12:00

Turkey	4–2	Russia 2
Kol 21'; Gulli 26', 73'; Arslantas 90+1'		Petukhov 13' (pen.); Shkolik 89'

Petrovsky Stadium, Saint Petersburg

=== Final ===
14 June 2019
18:00

Argentina	1–0	Russia
Lecanda 74'

Petrovsky Stadium, Saint Petersburg

== Final ranking ==
Pos	Team	Pld	W	D	L	GF	GA	GD	Pts
1	Argentina	5	5	0	0	11	3	+8	15
2	Russia	5	3	1	1	8	2	+6	10
3	Turkey	5	3	1	1	10	4	+6	10
4	Russia 2	5	2	1	2	8	8	0	7
5	Greece	5	3	2	0	11	5	+6	11
6	Iran	5	2	0	3	7	8	−1	6
7	Bulgaria	5	0	3	2	2	7	−5	3
8	Moldova	5	1	2	2	4	5	−1	5
9	Armenia	5	2	0	3	6	6	0	6
10	Kyrgyzstan	5	0	2	3	3	0	+3	2
11	Tajikistan	5	1	2	2	6	13	−7	5
12	India	5	0	2	3	3	8	−5	2

Source: Granatkin

== Goalscorers ==
There were 69 goals scored in 26 matches, for an average of 2.65 goals per match.

4 goals

- (Russia) Kirill Kosarev

3 goals

- (Greece) Panagiotis Tzimas
- (Iran) Ali Sobhani
- (Russia) Nikita Iosifov

2 goals

- (Argentina) Franco Orozco
- (Argentina) Matías Palacios
- (Argentina) Tomas Leonardo Lecanda
- (Armenia) Grenik Petrosyan
- (Greece) Georgios Vrakas
- (India) Akash Mishra
- (Iran) Aria Barzegar
- (Kyrgyzstan) Emir Shigaibaev
- (Russia) Danila Prokhin
- (Tajikistan) Rustam Soirov
- (Turkey) Muhammet Arslantas
- (Turkey) Oğuzhan Akgün

1 goal

- (Argentina) Oscar Exequiel Zeballos
- (Argentina) Matías Godoy
- (Argentina) Cristian Nicholas Medina
- (Argentina) Lautaro Ezequiel Cano
- (Armenia) Narek Alaverdyan
- (Armenia) Narek Grigoryan
- (Armenia) Aram Kolozyan
- (Armenia) Patvakan Avetisyan
- (Greece) Konstantinos Thymianis
- (Greece) Nikolaos Michelis
- (Greece) Ioannis Tsakiris
- (Greece) Theodoros Pournaras
- (Greece) Ioannis Fakkis
- (India) Rohit Danu
- (Iran) Ahmad Jalali
- (Iran) Reza Mohammad Moharrami
- (Kyrgyzstan) Ryskeldi Artykbaev
- (Moldova) Dan Pușcaș
- (Moldova) Valeriu Gaiu
- (Moldova) Ilie Ghiderman
- (Russia) Denis Faizullin
- (Russia) Maksim Petrov
- (Russia) Marat Apshatsev
- (Russia) Ilya Petukhov
- (Russia) Danil Pelikh
- (Tajikistan) Sharifbek Rahmatov
- (Tajikistan) Islom Zairov
- (Tajikistan) Amadoni Kamolov
- (Tajikistan) Ozodbek Panzhiev
- (Turkey) Ilkay İşler
- (Turkey) Burak Yasin Yeşilay

1 own goal

- (India) Muhammed Rafi (against Bulgaria)
