= 2016 Granatkin Memorial =

Tournament details
- Country: Russia
- Teams: 14

Final positions
- Champions: Slovenia
- Runners-up: Saint Petersburg–U18
- Third place: Russia

Tournament statistics
- Matches played: 35
- Goals scored: 122 (3.49 per match)
- All statistics correct as of 12 January 2016.

The 2016 Granatkin Memorial is its 16th edition after dissolution of the USSR. Russia under-18 is its defending champion.

== Groups ==
- All times are Further-eastern European Time (UTC+03:00).

=== Group A ===
| Team | Pld | W | D | L | GF | GA | GD | Pts |
|---|---|---|---|---|---|---|---|---|
| Saint Petersburg–U18 | 4 | 3 | 1 | 0 | 12 | 4 | +8 | 10 |
| Slovakia | 4 | 2 | 1 | 1 | 5 | 2 | +3 | 7 |
| Belarus | 4 | 2 | 0 | 2 | 8 | 7 | +1 | 6 |
| Japan | 4 | 1 | 1 | 2 | 8 | 10 | −2 | 4 |
| Lithuania | 4 | 0 | 1 | 3 | 3 | 13 | −10 | 1 |

| 3 January 2016 | Slovakia | 3–0 | Japan | Saint Petersburg |
| 14:15 | Jánošík 42'; Tupta 54'; Kele 85' | Report | | Stadium: Peterburgsky SCC; Referee: Maxim Chernetsov |

| 3 January 2016 | Belarus | 4–1 | Lithuania | Saint Petersburg |
| 19:00 | Saramakha 20'; Shvetsou 23'; Kuptsov 47', 61' | Report | Obolevičius 71' | Stadium: Peterburgsky SCC; Attendance: 300; Referee: Alexey Kuznetsov |

| 4 January 2016 | Saint Petersburg–U18 | 4–3 | Japan | Saint Petersburg |
| 19:00 | Krapukhin 5'; Obliakov 55', 86'; Kirillov 62' | Report | Ryotaro 27', 40'; Nakamura 64' | Stadium: Peterburgsky SCC |

| 5 January 2016 | Lithuania | 0–2 | Slovakia | Saint Petersburg |
| 19:00 | | Report | Oravec 8'; Kele 42' | Stadium: Peterburgsky SCC; Referee: Vladimir Babaev |

| 6 January 2016 | Saint Petersburg–U18 | 3–1 | Belarus | Saint Petersburg |
| 19:00 | Obliakov 29', 54'; Skliarov 58' | Report | Shvetsou 4' | Stadium: Peterburgsky SCC; Attendance: 1500; Referee: Maxim Chernetsov |

| 7 January 2016 | Lithuania | 2–2 | Japan | Saint Petersburg |
| 14:15 | Šešplaukis 11'; Jankauskas 38' | Report | Ito 85'; Nakamura 88' | Stadium: Peterburgsky SCC; Referee: Petr Miroshnichenko |

| 7 January 2016 | Slovakia | 0–0 | Saint Petersburg–U18 | Saint Petersburg |
| 19:00 | | Report | | Stadium: Peterburgsky SCC; Referee: Dmitry Nedvizhai |

| 8 January 2016 | Belarus | 2–0 | Slovakia | Saint Petersburg |
| 16:30 | Kuptsou 40'; Lisakovich 68' | Report | | Stadium: Peterburgsky SCC; Referee: Yunus Koshko |

| 9 January 2016 | Japan | 3–1 | Belarus | Saint Petersburg |
| 14:15 | Yoshihira 10'; Kajiyama 13'; Ito 65' | Report | Kuchynski 67' | Stadium: Peterburgsky SCC; Referee: Vasily Tikhonov |

| 9 January 2016 | Lithuania | 0–5 | Saint Petersburg–U18 | Saint Petersburg |
| 19:00 | | Report | Krapukhin 39', 57'; Kazakov 82'; Makeyev 84'; Kirillov 88' | Stadium: Peterburgsky SCC; Referee: Alexey Amelin |

=== Group B ===
| Team | Pld | W | D | L | GF | GA | GD | Pts |
|---|---|---|---|---|---|---|---|---|
| Russia | 4 | 2 | 2 | 0 | 14 | 5 | +9 | 8 |
| Finland | 4 | 1 | 3 | 0 | 5 | 4 | +1 | 6 |
| Kazakhstan | 4 | 1 | 1 | 2 | 3 | 8 | −5 | 4 |
| Moldova | 4 | 0 | 3 | 1 | 3 | 4 | −1 | 3 |
| Estonia | 4 | 0 | 3 | 1 | 6 | 10 | −4 | 3 |

| 3 January 2016 | Estonia | 2–2 | Moldova | Saint Petersburg |
| 12:00 | Mihhailov 24'; Kanter 58' | Report | Stână 4', 33' (pen.) | Stadium: Peterburgsky SCC; Referee: Yunus Koshko |

| 3 January 2016 | Kazakhstan | 0–5 | Russia | Saint Petersburg |
| 16:45 | | Report | Krugovoy 22'; Terekhov 42'; Kamenschikov 66'; Zakharov 68'; Tsygankov 79' (pen.) | Stadium: Peterburgsky SCC; Attendance: 3000; Referee: Gennady Anoshin |

| 4 January 2016 | Finland | 0–0 | Moldova | Saint Petersburg |
| 16:30 | | Report | | Stadium: Peterburgsky SCC; Referee: Vasily Tikhonov |

| 5 January 2016 | Russia | 5–1 | Estonia | Saint Petersburg |
| 16:30 | Terekhov 36', 39'; Yegor Denisov 38'; Lelukhin 56', 70' | Report | Kuusma 69' (pen.) | Stadium: Peterburgsky SCC; Referee: Alexey Amelin |

| 6 January 2016 | Finland | 1–0 | Kazakhstan | Saint Petersburg |
| 12:00 | Mäenpää 17' | Report | | Stadium: Peterburgsky SCC; Referee: Ivan Sidenkov |

| 7 January 2016 | Estonia | 1–1 | Finland | Saint Petersburg |
| 12:00 | Sorga 76' | Report | Källman 77' | Stadium: Peterburgsky SCC; Attendance: 150; Referee: Denis Savin |

| 7 January 2016 | Russia | 1–1 | Moldova | Saint Petersburg |
| 16:30 | Kamenschikov 17' | Report | Dros 20' | Stadium: Peterburgsky SCC; Attendance: 1500; Referee: Evgenii Galimov |

| 8 January 2016 | Kazakhstan | 2–2 | Estonia | Saint Petersburg |
| 12:00 | Bakhtiyarov 29'; Kassym 89' | Report | Lepik 39'; Mutso 87' (pen.) | Stadium: Peterburgsky SCC; Referee: Ilya Parfentiev |

| 9 January 2016 | Moldova | 0–1 | Kazakhstan | Saint Petersburg |
| 12:00 | | Report | Kassym 62' | Stadium: Peterburgsky SCC; Referee: Konstantin Averyanov |

| 9 January 2016 | Russia | 3–3 | Finland | Saint Petersburg |
| 16:30 | | | | Stadium: Peterburgsky SCC |

=== Group C ===
| Team | Pld | W | D | L | GF | GA | GD | Pts |
|---|---|---|---|---|---|---|---|---|
| Slovenia | 3 | 2 | 1 | 0 | 9 | 2 | +7 | 7 |
| Latvia | 3 | 1 | 2 | 0 | 3 | 2 | +1 | 5 |
| Azerbaijan | 3 | 1 | 1 | 1 | 3 | 5 | −2 | 4 |
| Bulgaria | 3 | 0 | 0 | 3 | 1 | 7 | −6 | 0 |

| 4 January 2016 | Slovenia | 4–1 | Bulgaria | Saint Petersburg |
| 12:00 | Bužinel 5', 19'; Sredojevič 26', 82' | Report | Ivanov 11' (pen.) | Stadium: Peterburgsky SCC; Attendance: 300; Referee: Dmitry Ermakov |

| 4 January 2016 | Azerbaijan | 1–1 | Latvia | Saint Petersburg |
| 14:15 | Mehdiyev 40' | Report | Uldriķis 45' (pen.) | Stadium: Peterburgsky SCC; Referee: Dmitry Nedvizhai |

| 6 January 2016 | Latvia | 1–1 | Slovenia | Saint Petersburg |
| 14:15 | Uldriķis 71' | Report | Bužinel 72' | Stadium: Peterburgsky SCC; Referee: Ivan Abrosimov |

| 6 January 2016 | Azerbaijan | 2–0 | Bulgaria | Saint Petersburg |
| 16:30 | Güler 68'; Gadirzade 90' | Report | | Stadium: Peterburgsky SCC; Referee: Evgeny Mamoyko |

| 8 January 2016 | Bulgaria | 0–1 | Latvia | Saint Petersburg |
| 14:15 | | Report | Uldriķis 21' (pen.) | Stadium: Peterburgsky SCC; Referee: Alexey Kuznetsov |

| 8 January 2016 | Slovenia | 4–0 | Azerbaijan | Saint Petersburg |
| 19:00 | Žižek 18', 36'; Šoštarič Karič 57'; Žurga 90' | Report | | Stadium: Peterburgsky SCC; Referee: Gennady Anoshin |

== Places 13-14 ==
| 11 January 2016 | Lithuania | 0–2 | Estonia | Saint Petersburg |
| 10:00 | | | | Stadium: Peterburgsky SCC |

== Places 11-12 ==
| 11 January 2016 | Moldova | 2–3 | Bulgaria | Saint Petersburg |
| 12:15 | | | | Stadium: Peterburgsky SCC |

== Places 9-10 ==
| 11 January 2016 | Kazakhstan | 2–3 | Japan | Saint Petersburg |
| 14:30 | | | | Stadium: Peterburgsky SCC |

== Semifinals ==
| 11 January 2016 | Finland | 1–5 | Slovenia | Saint Petersburg |
| 17:00 | | | | Stadium: Peterburgsky SCC |

| 11 January 2016 | Russia | 1–5 | Saint Petersburg–U18 | Saint Petersburg |
| 19:30 | | | | Stadium: Peterburgsky SCC |

== Places 7-8 ==
| 12 January 2016 | Azerbaijan | 1–2 | Belarus | Saint Petersburg |
| 12:00 | | | | Stadium: Peterburgsky SCC |

== Places 5-6 ==
| 12 January 2016 | Latvia | 2–2 (4–3 p) | Slovakia | Saint Petersburg |
| 14:15 | | | | Stadium: Peterburgsky SCC |

== Places 3-4 ==
| 12 January 2016 | Finland | 1–6 | Russia | Saint Petersburg |
| 16:30 | | | | Stadium: Peterburgsky SCC |

== Final ==
| 12 January 2016 | Slovenia | 1–0 | Saint Petersburg–U18 | Saint Petersburg |
| 19:00 | | | | Stadium: Peterburgsky SCC |
