= Julián Aude =

Argentine footballer (born 2003)

Personal information
- Full name: Julián Ezequiel Aude Bernardi
- Date of birth: 24 March 2003 (age 23)
- Place of birth: Lanús, Argentina
- Height: 1.80 m (5 ft 11 in)
- Position: Left-back

Team information
- Current team: LA Galaxy
- Number: 3

Youth career
- CBP Nicolás Avellaneda
- Lanús

Senior career*
Years	Team	Apps	(Gls)
2020–2023	Lanús	25	(0)
2023–	LA Galaxy	57	(1)

International career
2018–2019	Argentina U17		
- * Club domestic league appearances and goals as of 15:48, 4 May 2025 (UTC)

Julián Ezequiel Aude Bernardi (born 24 March 2003) is an Argentine professional footballer who plays as a left-back for Major League Soccer club LA Galaxy.

== Club career ==
Aude began his footballing career at the age of five with Club Biblioteca Popular Nicolás Avellaneda, a year prior to his arrival at Lanús. Having trained with the senior set-up in December 2019, Aude made the breakthrough into the first-team towards the end of 2020. Luis Zubeldía initially selected him on the substitute's bench on five occasions, three times in the Copa de la Liga Profesional and twice in the Copa Sudamericana. Aude's senior debut soon arrived in the former competition on 29 November 2020 against Talleres, as he featured for the final six minutes of a home win after replacing Facundo Quignon.

On 21 March 2023, Aude signed with Major League Soccer side LA Galaxy on a five-year deal for an undisclosed fee.

== International career ==
In 2018, Aude began representing Argentina at U17 level. After featuring in a friendly against the United States, Aude made six appearances at the 2019 South American U-17 Championship as they won the trophy. He wasn't selected for the subsequent FIFA U-17 World Cup, due to the fact he was recovering from surgery after being diagnosed with knee tendonitis. In 2019, as well as one for the U16s, Aude received a call-up from the U17s for the 2019 Granatkin Memorial; which they won.

== Personal life ==
Aude was born in Argentina and is of Italian descent, holding dual citizenship.

== Career statistics ==
As of 30 November 2020

Appearances and goals by club, season and competition
Club	Season	League			National Cup		League Cup		Continental		Other		Total	
Club	Season	Division	Apps	Goals	Apps	Goals	Apps	Goals	Apps	Goals	Apps	Goals	Apps	Goals
Lanús	2020–21 (Note: Soccerway counts Copa de la Liga Profesional appearances as league appearances.)	Primera División	1	0	0	0	0	0	0	0	0	0	1	0
Career total			1	0	0	0	0	0	0	0	0	0	1	0

== Honours ==
LA Galaxy

- MLS Cup: 2024

Argentina U17

- South American U-17 Championship: 2019
- Granatkin Memorial: 2019
