= 2015 Granatkin Memorial =

Tournament details
- Host country: Russia
- Teams: 18

Final positions
- Champions: Russia
- Runners-up: South Korea

Tournament statistics
- Goals scored: 112

The 2015 Granatkin Memorial is its 15th edition after dissolution of the USSR. Japan under-18 is its defending champion.

== Groups ==
=== Group A ===
Team	Pld	W	D	L	GF	GA	GD	Pts
Russia	2	2	0	0	4	0	+4	6
Lithuania	2	1	0	1	1	2	−1	3
Moldova	2	0	0	2	0	3	−3	0

3 January 2015	Russia	2–0	Moldova	Saint Petersburg
	Kipiani 9'; Melkadze 45'	Report		Stadium: Peterburgsky SCC; Attendance: 4,000; Referee: Maxim Chernitsov

4 January 2015	Moldova	0–1	Lithuania	Saint Petersburg
		Report	Matulevicius 85'	Stadium: Peterburgsky SCC; Attendance: 50; Referee: Yevgeni Kukulyak

5 January 2015	Russia	2–0	Lithuania	Saint Petersburg
	Kipiani 22'; Akhmetov 76'	Report		Stadium: Peterburgsky SCC; Attendance: 3,200; Referee: Pavel Shadykhanov

=== Group B ===
Team	Pld	W	D	L	GF	GA	GD	Pts
Belarus	2	2	0	0	4	1	+3	6
Latvia	2	1	0	1	6	2	+4	3
Estonia	2	0	0	2	0	7	−7	0

3 January 2015	Belarus	2–1	Latvia	Saint Petersburg
	Kapskiy 14'; Alexandrovich 22' (pen.)	Report	Dobrecovs 5' (pen.)	Stadium: SC Zenit; Attendance: 60; Referee: Dmitry Lipovoy

4 January 2015	Estonia	0–2	Belarus	Saint Petersburg
		Report	Kukharchyk 10' (pen.); Velko 74'	Stadium: Peterburgsky SCC; Attendance: 300; Referee: Evgeny Galimov

5 January 2015	Latvia	5–0	Estonia	Saint Petersburg
	Zalaks 19', 65', 68'; Dobrecovs 39' (pen.); Silings 56'	Report		Stadium: Peterburgsky SCC; Attendance: 300; Referee: Ilya Parfentiev

=== Group C ===
Team	Pld	W	D	L	GF	GA	GD	Pts
Slovenia	2	2	0	0	2	0	+2	6
Bulgaria	2	1	0	1	2	1	+1	3
Kazakhstan	2	0	0	2	0	3	−3	0

3 January 2015	Bulgaria	2–0	Kazakhstan	Saint Petersburg
	Georgiev 15'; Ignatov 73'	Report		Stadium: Peterburgsky SCC; Attendance: 300; Referee: Artem Lyubimov

4 January 2015	Slovenia	1–0	Bulgaria	Saint Petersburg
	Repas 36'	Report		Stadium: Peterburgsky SCC; Attendance: 300; Referee: Gennady Anoschin

5 January 2015	Kazakhstan	0–1	Slovenia	Saint Petersburg
		Report	Žužek 43' (pen.)	Stadium: Peterburgsky SCC; Attendance: 300; Referee: Ivan Sidenkov

=== Group D ===
Team	Pld	W	D	L	GF	GA	GD	Pts
Saint Petersburg u-18	2	1	1	0	3	2	+1	4
Slovakia	2	1	0	1	2	2	0	3
Greece	2	0	1	1	3	4	−1	1

3 January 2015	Slovakia	2–1	Greece	Saint Petersburg
	Kopičár 38', 72'	Report	Melissopoulos 32'	Stadium: SC Zenit; Attendance: 400; Referee: Dmitriy Veselov

4 January 2015	Saint Petersburg u-18	2–2	Greece	Saint Petersburg
	Andreyev 37'; Martirosian 68' (pen.)	Report	Angelopoulos 8' (pen.); Karakoutis 42'	Stadium: Peterburgsky SCC; Attendance: 2,500; Referee: Igor Panin

5 January 2015	Saint Petersburg u-18	1–0	Slovakia	Saint Petersburg
	Tiaglo 90'	Report		Stadium: Peterburgsky SCC; Attendance: 3,000; Referee: Denis Zabotin

=== Group E ===
Team	Pld	W	D	L	GF	GA	GD	Pts
South Korea	2	1	1	0	3	1	+2	4
Finland	2	1	1	0	2	1	+1	4
FK Moscow	2	0	0	2	0	3	−3	0

3 January 2015	FK Moscow under-18	0–1	Finland	Saint Petersburg
		Report	Lehtonen 69'	Stadium: Peterburgsky SCC; Attendance: 900; Referee: Anton Batalov

4 January 2015	Finland	1–1	South Korea	Saint Petersburg
	Haglund 14'	Report	Jihun 89'	Stadium: Peterburgsky SCC; Attendance: 1,500; Referee: Aleksey Avtukhovich

5 January 2015	South Korea	2–0	FK Moscow under-18	Saint Petersburg
	Lee Dong-jun 18' (pen.); Kang Jihun 71'	Report		Stadium: SC Zenit; Attendance: 300; Referee: Ivan Abrosimov

=== Group F ===
Team	Pld	W	D	L	GF	GA	GD	Pts
Azerbaijan	2	2	0	0	5	2	+3	6
Japan	2	1	0	1	3	2	+1	3
Russia-2	2	0	0	2	3	7	−4	0

3 January 2015	Japan	0–1	Azerbaijan	Saint Petersburg
		Report	Jafarov 7'	Stadium: Peterburgsky SCC; Attendance: 900; Referee: Alexander Borisov

4 January 2015	Azerbaijan	4–2	Russia-2	Saint Petersburg
	Sadigov 31', 57'; Jafarov 48'; Madatov 73'	Report	Galadjan 11'; Selukov 90' (pen.)	Stadium: SC Zenit; Attendance: 500; Referee: Ilya Trishin

5 January 2015	Russia-2	1–3	Japan	Saint Petersburg
	Makhatadze 57' (pen.)	Report	Kishimoto 39'; Ogawa 55'; Noda 71'	Stadium: Peterburgsky SCC; Attendance: 700; Referee: Pavel Kukuyan

=== Group G Places 1-6 ===
Team	Pld	W	D	L	GF	GA	GD	Pts
Russia	2	2	0	0	10	0	+10	6
Slovenia	2	1	1	0	2	5	−3	4
Belarus	2	0	0	2	1	8	−7	0

7 January 2015	Russia	4–0	Slovenia	Saint Petersburg
	Melkadze 34'; Kipiani 40'; Obolsky 57' (pen.); Mamin 62'	Report		Stadium: Peterburgsky SCC; Attendance: 5,300; Referee: Artyom Lyubimov

8 January 2015	Slovenia	2–1	Belarus	Saint Petersburg
	Omerovič 69', 77'	Report	Gromiko 16'	Stadium: Peterburgsky SCC; Attendance: 600; Referee: Aleksandr Borisov

9 January 2015	Russia	6–0	Belarus	Saint Petersburg
	Melkadze 10', 12'; Kipiani 45'; Akhmetov 73' (pen.); Mamin 84'; Poluboyarinov 89'	Report		Stadium: Peterburgsky SCC; Attendance: 2,300; Referee: Igor Panin

=== Group H Places 1-6 ===
Team	Pld	W	D	L	GF	GA	GD	Pts
South Korea	2	2	0	0	4	0	+4	6
Saint Petersburg u-18	2	1	0	1	4	3	+1	3
Azerbaijan	2	0	0	2	2	7	−5	0

7 January 2015	Saint Petersburg u-18	4–2	Azerbaijan	Saint Petersburg
	Andreev 9'; Starikov 54'; Ponikarov 79'; Ivanov 90'	Report	Madatov 26'; Sadigov 68'	Stadium: Peterburgsky SCC; Attendance: 5,000; Referee: Dmitriy Veselov

8 January 2015	Azerbaijan	0–3	South Korea	Saint Petersburg
		Report	Kim Minho 7'; Kang Jihun 56'; Minhyeok Lim 72'	Stadium: Peterburgsky SCC; Attendance: 2,500; Referee: Gennady Anoshin

9 January 2015	South Korea	1–0	Saint Petersburg u-18	Saint Petersburg
	Kang Jihun 30'	Report		Stadium: Peterburgsky SCC; Attendance: 3,800; Referee: Evgeniy Galimov

=== Group I Places 7-12 ===
Team	Pld	W	D	L	GF	GA	GD	Pts
Bulgaria	2	1	1	0	3	1	+2	4
Lithuania	2	1	0	1	2	2	0	3
Latvia	2	0	1	1	1	3	−2	1

7 January 2015	Lithuania	0–2	Bulgaria	Saint Petersburg
		Report	Ignatov 80'; Georgiev 87'	Stadium: Peterburgsky SCC; Attendance: 300; Referee: Maksim Chernetsov

8 January 2015	Bulgaria	1–1	Latvia	Saint Petersburg
	Kirilov 15'	Report	Juhnevičs 84'	Stadium: Peterburgsky SCC; Attendance: 300; Referee: Denis Zabotin

9 January 2015	Latvia	0–2	Lithuania	Saint Petersburg
		Report	Jurgelevičius 44'; Barauskas 50'	Stadium: Peterburgsky SCC; Attendance: 300; Referee: Ilya Trishin

=== Group J Places 7-12 ===
Team	Pld	W	D	L	GF	GA	GD	Pts
Japan	2	1	1	0	2	0	+2	4
Slovakia	2	1	0	1	2	2	0	3
Latvia	2	0	1	1	0	2	−2	1

7 January 2015	Slovakia	0–2	Japan	Saint Petersburg
		Report	Miyoshi 19'; Ogawa 34'	Stadium: Peterburgsky SCC; Attendance: 300; Referee: Petr Miroshnichenko

8 January 2015	Japan	0–0	Finland	Saint Petersburg
		Report		Stadium: Peterburgsky SCC; Attendance: 600; Referee: Dmitry Lipovoy

9 January 2015	Finland	0–2	Slovakia	Saint Petersburg
		Report	Mráz 30', 45'	Stadium: Peterburgsky SCC; Attendance: 500; Referee: Ivan Abrosinov

=== Group K Places 13-18 ===
Team	Pld	W	D	L	GF	GA	GD	Pts
Moldova	2	2	0	0	4	0	+4	6
Estonia	2	1	0	1	5	3	+2	3
Kazakhstan	2	0	0	2	2	8	−6	0

7 January 2015	Moldova	3–0	Kazakhstan	Saint Petersburg
	Muftolla 5' (o.g.); Matei 6'; Mandrîcenco 77'	Report		Stadium: SC Zenit; Attendance: 300; Referee: Yevgeniy Kukulyak

8 January 2015	Kazakhstan	2–5	Estonia	Saint Petersburg
	Luhay 39'; Mirsalimbaev 90+1'	Report	Tauts 28', 31'; Roosnupp 66', 71'; Riiberg 77'	Stadium: SC Zernit; Attendance: 300; Referee: Pavel Shadykhanov

9 January 2015	Estonia	0–1	Moldova	Saint Petersburg
		Report	Cobeţ 61'	Stadium: SC Zenit; Attendance: 300; Referee: Anton Batalov

=== Group K Places 13-18 ===
Team	Pld	W	D	L	GF	GA	GD	Pts
Greece	2	2	0	0	6	1	+5	6
Moscow u-18	2	1	0	1	4	5	−1	3
Russia-2	2	0	0	2	1	5	−4	0

7 January 2015	Greece	2–0	Russia-2	Saint Petersburg
	Lamprou 55'; Plegas 62'	Report		Stadium: SC Zenit; Attendance: 300; Referee: Aleksandr Dobrolyubov

8 January 2015	Russia-2	1–3	Moscow u-18	Saint Petersburg
	Makhatadze 41' (pen.)	Report	Tumentsev 3' (pen.); Sarveli 83', 89'	Stadium: SC Zernit; Attendance: 400; Referee: Yevgeniy Kukulyak

9 January 2015	Moscow u-18	1–4	Greece	Saint Petersburg
	Sarveli 60'	Report	Karakoutis 29'; Plegas 49' (pen.); Kakko 71'; Regkakos 74'	Stadium: SC Zenit; Attendance: 300; Referee: Pavel Kukuyan

=== Match for 17th place ===
11 January 2015	Russia-2	4–2	Kazakhstan	Saint Petersburg
	Makhatadze 8' (pen.); Pletnyov 55'; Tsigankov 60'; Selukov 69'	Report	Kirillov 54' (o.g.); Mirsalimbaev 56'	Stadium: SC Zenit; Attendance: 450; Referee: Aleksandr Borisov

=== Match for 15th place ===
11 January 2015	Moscow u-18	2–0	Estonia	Saint Petersburg
		Report

=== Match for 13th place ===
11 January 2015	Moldova	0–1	Greece	Saint Petersburg
		Report	Retsos 77'	Stadium: SC Zenit; Attendance: 350; Referee: Artyom Lyubimov

=== Match for 11th place ===
11 January 2015	Latvia	0–1	Finland	Saint Petersburg

=== Match for 9th place ===
11 January 2015	Lithuania	0–0 (3–4 p)	Slovakia	Saint Petersburg

=== Match for 7th place ===
11 January 2015	Bulgaria	0–3	Japan	Saint Petersburg

=== Match for 5th place ===
11 January 2015	Belarus	1–1 (4–5 p)	Azerbaijan	Saint Petersburg

=== Match for 3rd place ===
11 January 2015	Saint Petersburg u-18	0–1	Slovenia	Saint Petersburg

=== Final ===
11 January 2015	Russia	2–1	South Korea	Saint Petersburg
