= Chibisov =

Chibisov or feminine Chibisova may refer to:

== Chibisov ==
- Andrei Chibisov (born 1993), Russian ice hockey player
- Gennady Chibisov (1946–2008), Soviet/Russian cosmologist
- Nikandr Chibisov (1892–1959), Soviet military commander and Hero of the Soviet Union
- Sergei Chibisov (born 2000), Russian footballer

== Chibisova ==
- Ksenia Chibisova (born 1988), Russian judoka
- Oksana Chibisova (born 1977), Russian shot putter

== See also ==
- Chebyshev (disambiguation)
