= Matías Palacios =

Argentine footballer (born 2002)

Personal information
- Full name: Matías Damián Palacios
- Date of birth: 10 May 2002 (age 24)
- Place of birth: General Pico, Argentina
- Height: 1.68 m (5 ft 6 in)
- Position: Central midfielder

Team information
- Current team: Al Ain
- Number: 20

Youth career
- San Lorenzo

Senior career*
Years	Team	Apps	(Gls)
2018–2021	San Lorenzo	5	(0)
2021–2022	Basel	31	(1)
2021–2022	Basel U21	5	(3)
2022–	Al Ain	79	(11)

International career^{‡}
2017	Argentina U15		
2018–2019	Argentina U17	17	(5)
2018	Argentina U20	3	(0)
- * Club domestic league appearances and goals as of 16 March 2026 ‡ National team caps and goals as of 14:31, 21 March 2021 (UTC)

Matías Damián Palacios (born 10 May 2002) is an Argentine professional footballer who plays as a central midfielder for UAE Pro League side Al Ain.

== Club career ==
=== San Lorenzo ===
Palacios began his career with San Lorenzo. He made his professional football debut on 21 September 2018, featuring for the final twenty-nine minutes of a 3–2 victory over Patronato at the Estadio Pedro Bidegain. Aged 16, it meant Palacios became the club's youngest ever player in Primera División history. He made five further appearances for the club, which included his one and only start on 10 January 2021 against Banfield.

=== Basel ===
On 15 February 2021, Palacios signed with Swiss Super League club Basel; penning a contract until 2025. He joined Basel's first team for their 2020–21 season under head coach Ciriaco Sforza. Palacios played his domestic league debut for his new club in the away game in the Kybunpark on 27 February as Basel were defeated 1–3 by St. Gallen. He scored his first goal for the club on 15 August 2021 in the Swiss Cup away game as Basel won 7–0 against amateur club FC Schönenwerd-Niedergösgen. He scored his first league goal for the club in the away game in the Swissporarena on 28 November as Basel won 3–1 against Luzern.

At the beginning of the next season Palacios left the club because he had only been used as a substitute. During his time with them, Palacios played a total of 62 games for Basel scoring a total of four goals. 31 of these games were in the Swiss Super League, three in the Swiss Cup, 12 in the Europa Conference League and 16 were friendly games. He scored one goal in the domestic league, two in the cup and the other was scored during the test games.

=== Al Ain ===
Palacios moved on to play for Al Ain in the United Arab Emirates.

== International career ==
Palacios represented Argentina at U15, U17 and U20 level. For the U15s, Palacios won the 2017 South American Championship prior to winning the 2016 COTIF Tournament with the U20s. Pablo Aimar selected Palacios for the 2019 South American U-17 Championship on 3 March. Diego Placente called him up for the U17s' trip to Russia for the 2019 Granatkin Memorial. He scored in game one against Armenia, prior to netting versus Turkey in the semi-finals on the way to Argentina winning the competition. He was also chosen as the tournament's best midfielder. In October 2019, Palacios was picked for the 2019 FIFA U-17 World Cup in Brazil.

== Personal life ==
His brother, Julián, is a fellow footballer; he also started off in San Lorenzo's youth academy.

== Career statistics ==
As of 26 May 2024.

Appearances and goals by club, season and competition
Club	Season	League			National cup (Note: Includes Swiss Cup, UAE President's Cup)		League cup (Note: Includes UAE League Cup)		Continental		Other		Total	
Club	Season	Division	Apps	Goals	Apps	Goals	Apps	Goals	Apps	Goals	Apps	Goals	Apps	Goals
San Lorenzo	2018–19	Argentine Primera División	1	0	1	0	0	0	—		—		2	0
San Lorenzo	2019–20	Argentine Primera División	0	0	0	0	0	0	—		—		0	0
San Lorenzo	2020–21	Argentine Primera División	4	0	0	0	0	0	—		—		4	0
San Lorenzo	Total		5	0	1	0	0	0	0	0	0	0	6	0
Basel	2020–21	Swiss Super League	9	0	0	0	—		0	0	—		9	0
Basel	2021–22	Swiss Super League	22	1	3	2	—		12 (Note: Appearances in UEFA Europa Conference League)	0	—		37	3
Basel	Total		31	1	3	2	—		12	0	0	0	45	3
Al Ain	2022–23	UAE Pro League	21	0	5	1	5	1	—		1 (Note: Appearance in UAE Super Cup)	0	32	2
Al Ain	2023–24	UAE Pro League	12	2	1	1	5	1	9 (Note: Appearances in AFC Champions League)	0	0	0	27	4
Al Ain	Total		33	2	6	2	10	2	9	0	1	0	59	6
Career total			69	3	10	4	10	2	21	0	1	0	111	9

== Honours ==
Argentina U15

- South American U-15 Championship: 2017

Argentina U17

- South American U-17 Championship: 2019
- Granatkin Memorial: 2019

Argentina U20

- L'Alcúdia International Football Tournament: 2018

Al Ain

- AFC Champions League: 2023-24
