= Tomás Lecanda =

Argentine footballer (born 2002)

Personal information
- Full name: Tomás Leonardo Lecanda
- Date of birth: 29 January 2002 (age 24)
- Place of birth: Martínez, Argentina
- Height: 1.81 m (5 ft 11 in)
- Position: Centre-back

Team information
- Current team: Agropecuario (on loan from Tigre)

Youth career
- 2011–2021: River Plate

Senior career*
Years	Team	Apps	(Gls)
2021–2024	River Plate	1	(0)
2022	→ Barracas Central (loan)	5	(0)
2022	→ Aldosivi (loan)	10	(0)
2023	→ Argentinos Juniors (loan)	0	(0)
2024–	Tigre	3	(0)
2024	→ Imbabura (loan)	12	(0)
2025	→ San Martín SJ (loan)	14	(1)
2026–	→ Agropecuario (loan)	2	(0)

International career
2017	Argentina U17	9	(3)
2019	Argentina U18	8	(2)
- * Club domestic league appearances and goals as of 15:12, 19 March 2026 (UTC)

Tomás Leonardo Lecanda (born 29 January 2002) is an Argentine professional footballer who plays as a centre-back for Agropecuario, on loan from Tigre.

== Career ==
Lecanda is product of River Plate's youth academy, having joined in 2011. On 27 September 2019, he signed his first professional contract with his childhood club. Lecanda made his professional debut with River Plate in a 2–1 Copa Libertadores win over Independiente Santa Fe on 19 May 2021; the game was noteworthy as River Plate was hit by a COVID-19 outbreak, resulting in them having no substitute players, and their outfielder Enzo Pérez had to play as goalkeeper.

In January 2022, Lecanda was loaned out to Barracas Central until the end of the year. In June 2022, the spell was terminated and Lecenda instead joined fellow league club Aldosivi on loan for the rest of the year.

On 23 July 2024, Lecanda joined Imbabura in Ecuador.

== International career ==
Lecanda is a youth international for Argentina. He represented the Argentina U17s in their campaign at the 2019 FIFA U-17 World Cup, and helped them win the 2019 South American U-17 Championship. He was part of the Argentina U18s that won the 2019 Granatkin Memorial, scoring a goal in the final.

== Honours ==
Argentina U17

- South American U-17 Championship: 2019

Argentina U18

- Granatkin Memorial: 2019 Granatkin Memorial
