= Ryskeldi Artykbayev =

Kyrgyz footballer

Personal information
- Full name: Ryskeldi Artykbayevich Artykbayev
- Date of birth: 9 April 2001 (age 25)
- Place of birth: Bishkek, Kyrgyzstan
- Height: 1.80 m (5 ft 11 in)
- Position: Striker

Team information
- Current team: Dordoi Bishkek
- Number: 17

Youth career
- –2020: Dordoi Bishkek

Senior career*
Years	Team	Apps	(Gls)
2020–	Alay Osh	17	(8)

International career^{‡}
2021–	Kyrgyzstan	1	(0)
- * Club domestic league appearances and goals as of 16:28, 8 September 2021 (UTC) ‡ National team caps and goals as of 16:28, 8 September 2021 (UTC)

Ryskeldi Artykbayevich Artykbayev (Kyrgyz: Рыскелди Артыкбаев; Russian: Рыскелди Артыкбаевич Артыкбаев; born 9 April 2001 in Bishkek) is a Kyrgyz professional footballer who plays for Alay Osh, and the Kyrgyzstan national team.

== Club career ==
Artykbayev is a graduate of the Dordoi Bishkek Academy. He made his unofficial first-team debut in a 10–1 friendly victory over FC Zhivoye Pivo on 20 August 2018. He scored his first goal in the match also.

== International career ==
In June 2019 Artykbayev competed with the Kyrgyzstan U20 team at the 2019 Granatkin Memorial tournament in Saint Petersburg, Russia. He scored against India in a penalty shootout on the way to securing a 10th-place finish in the competition. He also scored against Greece in the group stage. Later that year he was part of the squad again for 2020 AFC U-19 Championship qualification and scored against the United Arab Emirates in the eventual 2–0 victory. In March 2021 he appeared for the national U23 side against the senior teams of Bangladesh and Nepal in a friendly tournament in Kathmandu, Nepal.

Artykbayev was named to Kyrgyzstan's senior roster for the 2021 Three Nations Cup held in Bishkek in September 2021. He made his senior international debut in his team's second match, coming on as a second-half substitute for Eldar Moldozhunusov against Bangladesh on 7 September. Kyrgyzstan won the match 4–1.

=== International career statistics ===
As of match played 7 September 2021.

Kyrgyzstan national team
Year	Apps	Goals
2021	1	0
Total	1	0
