= Chebyshev (disambiguation) =

Chebyshev may refer to:

- Pafnuty Chebyshev: A Russian mathematician
  - Chebyshev function: Number-theory functions
  - Chebyshev polynomials
  - Chebyshev filter
  - Chebyshev's inequality
  - Chebyshev distance
- Chebyshev (crater): A lunar crater
- 2010 Chebyshev: An asteroid from the asteroid belt

== See also ==
- Chibisov (disambiguation)
