= Konstantinos Plegas =

Greek association football player (born 1997)

Personal information
- Date of birth: 20 April 1997 (age 29)
- Place of birth: Kalavryta, Greece
- Height: 1.84 m (6 ft 1/2 in)
- Position: Defensive midfielder

Team information
- Current team: Niki Volos
- Number: 6

Youth career
- Apollon Eglykada

Senior career*
Years	Team	Apps	(Gls)
2012–2014	Panachaiki	23	(1)
2014–2017	Olympiacos	0	(0)
2014	→ Panachaiki (loan)	5	(0)
2016–2017	→ Panthrakikos (loan)	11	(3)
2017–2018	Panionios	0	(0)
2018–2019	Panachaiki	32	(0)
2019–2020	Doxa Drama	16	(1)
2020–2021	Chania	23	(0)
2021–2022	Anagennisi Karditsa	26	(2)
2022–2024	AEL	51	(2)
2024–2026	Levadiakos	16	(0)
2026–	Niki Volos	6	(0)

International career^{‡}
2014	Greece U17	1	(0)
2015	Greece U18	5	(2)
2015	Greece U19	2	(0)
2016	Greece U21	1	(0)
- * Club domestic league appearances and goals as of 20 April 2026 ‡ National team caps and goals as of 11 November 2016

Konstantinos Plegas (Greek: Κωνσταντίνος Πλέγας; born 20 April 1997) is a Greek professional association football player who plays as a defensive midfielder for Super League Greece 2 club Niki Volos.

== Honours ==
=== Olympiacos ===
- Super League: 2015–16
