= Nikos Michelis =

Greek footballer

Nikos Michelis Νίκος Μιχελής
Personal information
- Full name: Nikolaos Michelis
- Date of birth: 23 March 2001 (age 25)
- Place of birth: Athens, Greece
- Height: 1.92 m (6 ft 4 in)
- Position: Centre-back

Team information
- Current team: Académico de Viseu
- Number: 2

Youth career
- 2017–2019: Asteras Tripolis
- 2019–2021: AC Milan

Senior career*
Years	Team	Apps	(Gls)
2021–2022	AC Milan	0	(0)
2021–2022	→ Willem II (loan)	13	(0)
2022–2024	Mirandés	16	(0)
2023–2024	→ Osasuna B (loan)	25	(1)
2024–	Académico de Viseu	48	(3)

International career^{‡}
2019	Greece U18	5	(1)
2019	Greece U19	1	(0)
2022	Greece U21	3	(1)
- * Club domestic league appearances and goals as of 19 June 2026 ‡ National team caps and goals as of 11 June 2022

Nikolaos "Nikos" Michelis (Greek: Νικόλαος "Νίκος" Μιχελής; born 23 March 2001) is a Greek professional footballer who plays as a centre-back for Primeira Liga club Académico de Viseu.

== Club career ==
=== AC Milan ===
During his maiden full campaign in Italy, Michelis made 15 appearances for AC Milan's youth team in the Campionato Nazionale Primavera, popping up with the one assist in a 5–2 victory against Virtus Entella youth sector at home in November 2019.

==== Loan to Willem II ====
On 13 July 2021, Michelis was loaned to Eredivisie club Willem II until the end of the season, with an option to buy when the loan is over.

=== Mirandés ===
On 30 July 2022, Michelis signed a three-year contract with Spanish Segunda División side Mirandés.

==== Loan to Osasuna B ====
On 16 July of the following year, he was loaned to Primera Federación side CA Osasuna B for the season.

=== Académico de Viseu ===
On 15 August 2024, Michelis moved to Portugal, and joined Liga Portugal 2 club Académico de Viseu as a free agent.

== International career ==
Michelis has represented Greece internationally with the under-18s, under-19s and under-21s.
