= Muhammet Arslantaş =

Turkish footballer (born 2001)

Personal information
- Date of birth: 27 January 2001 (age 25)
- Place of birth: Bayburt, Turkey
- Height: 1.88 m (6 ft 2 in)
- Position: Forward

Team information
- Current team: Çorluspor 1947
- Number: 9

Youth career
- 2012–2014: Trakya Fenerspor
- 2014–2017: Bucaspor
- 2017–2019: İstanbul Başakşehir

Senior career*
Years	Team	Apps	(Gls)
2019–2025	İstanbul Başakşehir	3	(0)
2020–2021	→ Boluspor (loan)	7	(1)
2021	→ Turgutluspor (loan)	16	(1)
2021–2022	→ Belediye Kütahyaspor (loan)	31	(14)
2023–2024	→ Şanlıurfaspor (loan)	14	(2)
2024	→ Kastamonuspor 1966 (loan)	12	(3)
2024–2025	→ Elazığspor (loan)	12	(1)
2025	→ Muğlaspor (loan)	14	(12)
2025–	Çorluspor 1947	11	(4)

International career^{‡}
2017–2018	Turkey U17	11	(0)
2018–2019	Turkey U18	9	(2)
2019–2020	Turkey U19	12	(7)
- * Club domestic league appearances and goals as of 30 November 2025 ‡ National team caps and goals as of 21:18, 11 August 2022 (UTC)

Muhammet Arslantaş (born 27 January 2001) is a Turkish professional footballer who plays as a forward for TFF 3. Lig club Çorluspor 1947.

== Professional career ==
Arslantaş is a youth product of the academies of Trakya Fenerspor, Bucaspor and İstanbul Başakşehir. On 4 January 2019, he signed his first professional contract with İstanbul Başakşehir. He made his professional debut with İstanbul Başakşehir in a 1–1 Süper Lig tie with Denizlispor on 8 December 2019. On 10 September 2020, he joined Boluspor on loan for the 2020-21 season in the TFF First League. His loan was cut short, and moved to Turgutluspor for the second half of the season on 30 January 2021. He spent the 2021-22 season on loan with Belediye Kütahyaspor, and had a prolific spell with 14 goals in 31 matches.

== International career ==
Arslantaş is a youth international for Turkey, having played up to the Turkey U19s.

== Honours ==
İstanbul Başakşehir

- Süper Lig: 2019–20
