= Granatkin Memorial =

International football tournament

- Founded: 1981
- Region: International
- Teams: 12 (2019)
- Current champions: Argentina (1st title)
- Most championships: Russia (20 titles)
- Website: Official website

The Granatkin Memorial (Russian: Мемориал Гранаткина) is a youth association football tournament which traditionally features invited national teams composed of U-17/U-18/U-19 players. The tournament is held in Saint Petersburg since 2006 (previously in Moscow and Leningrad / Saint Petersburg), and since 2017 the final is held in summer (previously indoors in winter).

== Tournament history ==
In 1981 in Moscow started the first Granatkin Memorial – the International youth football tournament initiated by the FIFA President Joao Havelange to perpetuate the memory of the FIFA First Vice-President Valentin Granatkin.

The tournament attracted the attention of both professionals and football fans. The matches of the Memorial were attended by the President of the International Olympic Committee Juan Antonio Samaranch. The prize to the winners was presented by Granatkin’s daughter Marina Valentinovna.

In 1981 and 1982 the tournament was held in Moscow. Since 1983 Leningrad became the Memorial residence. Till 1992 in twelve tournaments have taken part combined teams from 16 countries.

The second period of the Memorial started in the year 2001. Since that time the scheme of the competition radically changed. The number of the participants increased to 8 combined teams, which are divided into two groups. Every group plays round robin. When in play-off teams contest the places from 1 to 8.

Granatkin tournament is noted as a place of discoveries. Memorial is a first loud word from the future stars of world football – Andreas Moeller, Tony Meola, Oliver Bierhoff, Carsten Jancker, Marcel Desailly, Igor Kolyvanov, Anatoliy Tymoshchuk and Alexandr Mostovoi — many used to participate in the tournament.

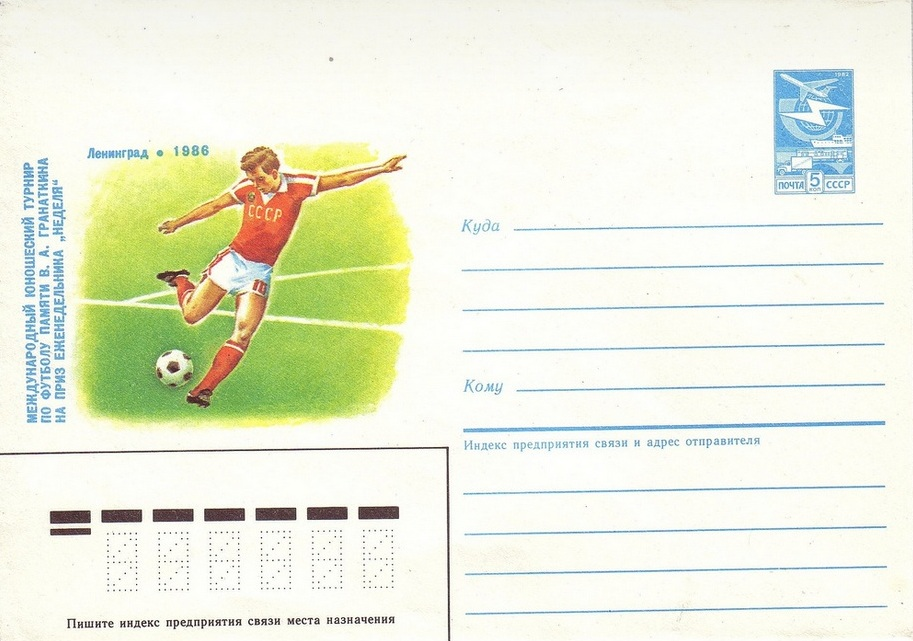
Cover of the Soviet Union, 1985

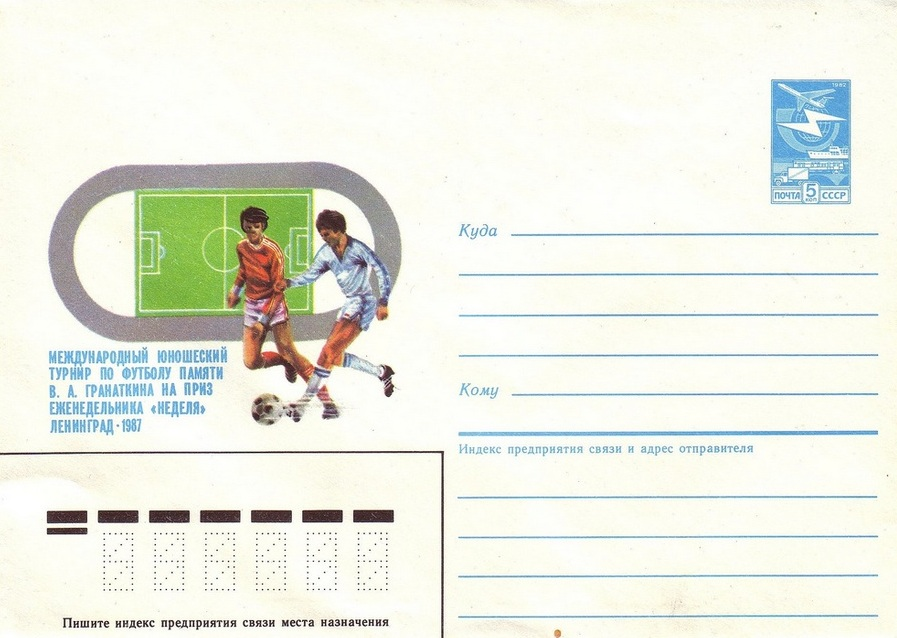
Cover of the Soviet Union, 1986

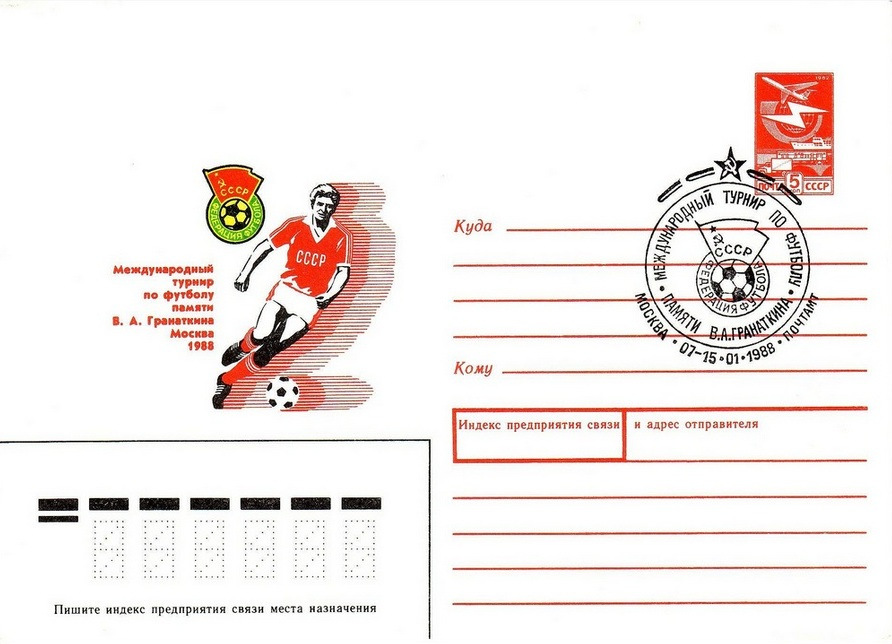
Cover of the Soviet Union, 1987

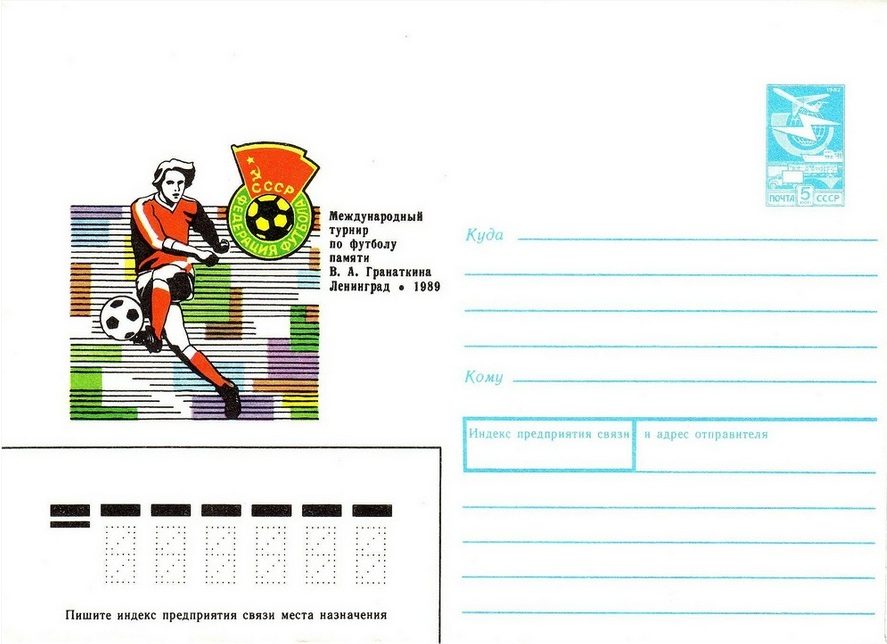
Cover of the Soviet Union, 1988

== Results ==
Edition	Year	Winner	Runner up	3rd places
1	1981	West Germany	Soviet Union-1	Spain
2	1982	Soviet Union-1	Brazil	Soviet Union-2
3	1983	Soviet Union-1	France	Czechoslovakia
4	1984	West Germany	Soviet Union-1	Belgium
5	1985	Soviet Union-1	France	Soviet Union-2
6	1986	Soviet Union-1	West Germany	France
7	1987	Soviet Union-1	Soviet Union-2	France
8	1988	Soviet Union-1	China	Soviet Union-2
9	1989	Soviet Union-1	Belgium	Soviet Union-2
10	1990	Soviet Union-1	China	West Germany
11	1991	Soviet Union-2	Soviet Union-1	China
12	1992	Germany	CIS-1	China
13	2001	Russia	China	Iran
14	2002	Russia	Lithuania	Ukraine
15	2003	South Korea	China	Belarus
16	2004	Russia	Poland	Belarus
17	2005	Russia	Ukraine	Belarus
18	2006	Germany	Slovakia	Russia
19	2007	Belarus	Turkey	Russia
20	2008	Russia	Belarus	Ukraine
21	2009	Russia	Turkey	Ukraine
22	2010	Russia	Ukraine	Turkey
23	2011	Finland	China	Ukraine
24	2012	Italy	Finland	Turkey
25	2013	Russia	Saint Petersburg	Ukraine
26	2014	Japan	Russia	Slovakia
27	2015	Russia	South Korea	Slovenia
28	2016	Slovenia	Saint Petersburg	Russia
29	2017	Russia	Kazakhstan	Saint Petersburg
30	2018	Saint Petersburg	Turkey	Russia
31	2019	Argentina	Russia	Turkey
—	2020	Cancelled due to the COVID-19 pandemic in Russia		
32	2021			

== Statistics ==
=== Performances by countries ===
In total, eight countries celebrated the victory in the tournament. Young players from 22 countries finished in top 3. The most titled is team USSR / Russia with 20 wins. Young talents from Germany won gold medals four times. The third in the list of successful teams is Belarus (1 gold, 1 silver and 3 bronze medals). In terms of the number of medals, the leaders are: USSR / Russia (38 medals), China and Ukraine (7 medals each).

Team	Titles	Runners-up	Third place
Russia (including USSR, CIS and Saint Petersburg XI)	20: Soviet Union-1: 1982, 1983, 1985, 1986, 1987, 1988, 1989, 1990; Soviet Union-2: 1991; Russia: 2001, 2002, 2004, 2005, 2008, 2009, 2010, 2013, 2015, 2017; Saint Petersburg: 2018	9: Soviet Union-1: 1981, 1984, 1991; Soviet Union-2: 1987; CIS-1: 1992; Saint Petersburg: 2013, 2016; Russia: 2014, 2019	9: Soviet Union-2: 1982, 1985, 1988, 1989; Russia: 2006, 2007, 2016, 2018; Saint Petersburg: 2017
Germany (including West Germany)	4 (1981, 1984, 1992, 2006)	1 (1986)	1 (1990)
Belarus	1 (2007)	1 (2008)	3 (2003, 2004, 2005)
Finland	1 (2011)	1 (2012)	
South Korea	1 (2003)	1 (2015)	
Slovenia	1 (2016)		1 (2015)
Italy	1 (2012)		
Japan	1 (2014)		
Argentina	1 (2019)		
China		5 (1988, 1990, 2001, 2003, 2011)	2 (1991, 1992)
Turkey		3 (2007, 2009, 2018)	3 (2010, 2012, 2019)
Ukraine		2 (2005, 2010)	5 (2002, 2008, 2009, 2011, 2013)
France		2 (1983, 1985)	2 (1986, 1987)
Belgium		1 (1989)	1 (1984)
Slovakia		1 (2006)	1 (2014)
Brazil		1 (1982)	
Lithuania		1 (2002)	
Poland		1 (2004)	
Kazakhstan		1 (2017)	
Spain			1 (1981)
Czech Republic (including Czechoslovakia)			1 (1983)
Iran			1 (2001)

=== Performances by confederations ===
Confederation	Titles	Runners-up
UEFA	28 (1981–2002, 2004–2013, 2015–2018)	24 (1981, 1983–1987, 1989, 1991–1992, 2002, 2004–2010, 2012–2014, 2016–2019)
AFC	2 (2003, 2014)	5 (1988, 1990, 2001, 2003, 2011)
CONMEBOL	1 (2019)	1 (1982)
CAF	–	–
CONCACAF	–	–

== See also ==
- Toulon Tournament, a similar youth football competition held in France.
