= Ahmadreza Jalali =

Iranian footballer

Personal information
- Date of birth: 14 August 2001 (age 25)
- Place of birth: Dasht-e Azadegan, Iran
- Height: 1.75 m (5 ft 9 in)
- Position: Left back

Youth career
- –2018: Foolad

Senior career*
Years	Team	Apps	(Gls)
2018–2019	Foolad	2	(0)
2019	Shahr Khodro	0	(0)
2019–2022	Foolad	4	(0)
2022–2023	Aluminium Arak	3	(0)
2023–2024	Esteghlal Khuzestan	10	(0)

International career^{‡}
2016	Iran U16	4	(0)
2017	Iran U17	5	(0)
2019	Iran U19	7	(2)
2021	Iran U23	1	(0)
- * Club domestic league appearances and goals as of 1 June 2024 ‡ National team caps and goals as of 25 October 2021

Ahmadreza Jalali (Persian: احمدرضا جلالی; born 14 August 2001) is an Iranian footballer who plays as a left-back.

== Honours ==
Foolad

- Hazfi Cup: 2020–21
- Iranian Super Cup: 2021

Iran U16

- AFC U-16 Championship runner-up: 2016

Iran U19

- CAFA Junior Championship 2019
