= Danil Pelikh =

Russian footballer

Personal information
- Full name: Danil Andreyevich Pelikh
- Date of birth: 2 January 2001 (age 25)
- Place of birth: Bryukhovetskaya, Russia
- Height: 1.77 m (5 ft 10 in)
- Position: Right-back

Team information
- Current team: Volgar Astrakhan
- Number: 26

Youth career
- 2017–2019: Krasnodar

Senior career*
Years	Team	Apps	(Gls)
2018–2020	Krasnodar-3	6	(0)
2018–2021	Krasnodar-2	48	(0)
2020	Krasnodar	0	(0)
2022–2024	Rotor Volgograd	72	(1)
2024–2025	Chayka Peschanokopskoye	33	(0)
2025–	Volgar Astrakhan	34	(0)

International career^{‡}
2016	Russia U-15	5	(1)
2016–2017	Russia U-16	9	(0)
2017	Russia U-17	4	(0)
2019	Russia U-18	5	(1)
- * Club domestic league appearances and goals as of 15 November 2026 ‡ National team caps and goals as of 14 June 2019

Danil Andreyevich Pelikh (Russian: Данил Андреевич Пелих; born 2 January 2001) is a Russian football player who plays for Volgar Astrakhan.

== Club career ==
He made his debut in the Russian Professional Football League for Krasnodar-2 on 24 March 2018 in a game against Legion-Dynamo Makhachkala. He made his Russian Football National League debut for Krasnodar-2 on 10 November 2018 in a game against Tambov.
