= Stanislav Krapukhin =

Russian footballer

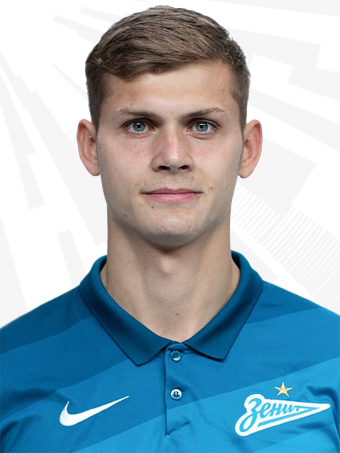
- Krapukhin with Zenit in 2020

Personal information
- Full name: Stanislav Avenirovich Krapukhin
- Date of birth: 28 March 1998 (age 28)
- Place of birth: Saint Petersburg, Russia
- Height: 1.90 m (6 ft 3 in)
- Position: Forward

Team information
- Current team: Bistrica
- Number: 9

Youth career
- –2011: Kolomyagi St. Petersburg
- 2011–2015: Zenit St. Petersburg

Senior career*
Years	Team	Apps	(Gls)
2015–2018	Zenit St. Petersburg	0	(0)
2017–2018	→ Zenit-2 St. Petersburg	19	(1)
2018–2020	Tom Tomsk	10	(0)
2019–2020	→ Novosibirsk (loan)	11	(0)
2020	Zvezda St. Petersburg	0	(0)
2020–2021	Zenit St. Petersburg	3	(0)
2020–2021	→ Zenit-2 St. Petersburg	29	(19)
2021–2023	Riga	8	(2)
2022	→ Auda (loan)	30	(8)
2023	Caspiy	10	(0)
2023	Radnički Beograd	16	(4)
2024	Aluminij	9	(1)
2024–	Bistrica	12	(4)

International career
2016	Russia U18	6	(1)
2016	Russia U19	3	(0)
- * Club domestic league appearances and goals as of 2 November 2024

Stanislav Avenirovich Krapukhin (Russian: Станислав Авенирович Крапухин; born 28 March 1998) is a Russian football player who plays for Bistrica in the Slovenian Second League.

== Club career ==
He made his debut in the Russian Football National League for Zenit-2 St. Petersburg on 8 March 2017 in a game against Neftekhimik Nizhnekamsk.

He made his Russian Premier League debut for Zenit St. Petersburg on 21 November 2020 in a game against Akhmat Grozny. He substituted Aleksandr Yerokhin in the 87th minute.

On 18 August 2021, he joined Latvian club Riga.

== Honours ==
Zenit Saint Petersburg

- Russian Premier League: 2020–21

== Career statistics ==
As of 4 June 2021

Club	Season	League			Cup		Continental		Other		Total	
Club	Season	Division	Apps	Goals	Apps	Goals	Apps	Goals	Apps	Goals	Apps	Goals
Zenit-2 St. Petersburg	2016–17	FNL	7	1	–		–		5 (Note: Appearances in the FNL Cup)	1	12	2
Zenit-2 St. Petersburg	2017–18	FNL	12	0	–		–		–		12	0
Tom Tomsk	2018–19	FNL	10	0	1	0	–		1 (Note: Appearance in the promotion play-offs)	0	12	0
Novosibirsk	2019–20	PFL	11	0	1	0	–		–		12	0
Zvezda St. Petersburg	2020–21	PFL	–		1	0	–		–		1	0
Zenit-2 St. Petersburg	2020–21	PFL	27	17	–		–		–		27	17
Zenit-2 St. Petersburg	Total		46	18	0	0	0	0	5	1	51	19
Zenit St. Petersburg	2020–21	Russian Premier League	3	0	1	0	–		–		4	0
Career total			70	18	4	0	0	0	6	1	80	19
