= Sergei Chibisov =

Russian footballer

Personal information
- Full name: Sergei Aleksandrovich Chibisov
- Date of birth: 1 March 2000 (age 26)
- Height: 1.83 m (6 ft 0 in)
- Position: Defender

Team information
- Current team: FC Kaluga
- Number: 14

Youth career
- FC Zenit Saint Petersburg

Senior career*
| Years | Team | Apps | (Gls) |
| 2019–2021 | FC Zenit Saint Petersburg | 1 | (0) |
| 2019–2020 | → FC Åland (loan) | | |
| 2020–2021 | → FC Zenit-2 Saint Petersburg | 26 | (0) |
| 2021–2023 | FC Yenisey Krasnoyarsk | 10 | (0) |
| 2021–2023 | FC Yenisey-2 Krasnoyarsk | 33 | (3) |
| 2023 | FC Chayka Peschanokopskoye | 6 | (0) |
| 2023–2024 | FC Tver | 15 | (1) |
| 2024–2025 | FC Avangard Kursk | 54 | (1) |
| 2025–2026 | FC Volna Nizhny Novgorod Oblast | 12 | (0) |
| 2026– | FC Kaluga | 33 | (0) |
- * Club domestic league appearances and goals as of 15 November 2026

Sergei Aleksandrovich Chibisov (Russian: Сергей Александрович Чибисов; born 1 March 2000) is a Russian football player who plays for FC Kaluga.

== Club career ==
He started his senior career on loan in the fourth-tier Finnish club FC Åland.

He made his debut in the Russian Premier League for FC Zenit Saint Petersburg on 16 May 2021 in a game against FC Tambov. He substituted Daler Kuzyayev in the 78th minute.

On 29 June 2021, he signed a 2-year contract with an extension option with FC Yenisey Krasnoyarsk.

== Honours ==
=== Club ===
Zenit Saint Petersburg

- Russian Premier League: 2020–21
