= Kirill Makeyev =

Russian footballer

Personal information
- Full name: Kirill Sergeyevich Makeyev
- Date of birth: 18 May 1998 (age 28)
- Place of birth: Saint Petersburg, Russia
- Height: 1.82 m (6 ft 0 in)
- Position: Forward

Youth career
- Smena-Zenit

Senior career*
Years	Team	Apps	(Gls)
2016–2020	Zenit	0	(0)
2018–2019	→ Zenit-2	20	(3)
2020	→ Daugavpils (loan)	23	(4)
2021	Zvezda St. Petersburg	12	(0)
2021–2023	Irtysh Omsk	41	(8)
2023–2024	Kirovets St. Petersburg		
2024	Murom	13	(0)
- * Club domestic league appearances and goals as of 16 November 2024

Kirill Sergeyevich Makeyev (Russian: Кирилл Сергеевич Макеев; born 18 May 1998) is a Russian football player.

== Club career ==
He made his debut in the Russian Football National League for FC Zenit-2 Saint Petersburg on 17 July 2018 in a game against FC Tambov.
