= Dmitri Kirillov =

Russian footballer

Personal information
- Full name: Dmitri Igorevich Kirillov
- Date of birth: 16 June 1998 (age 28)
- Place of birth: Tver, Russia
- Height: 1.72 m (5 ft 7 1/2 in)
- Position: Midfielder

Youth career
- –2018: FC Zenit Saint Petersburg

Senior career*
| Years | Team | Apps | (Gls) |
| 2017–2020 | FC Zenit-2 Saint Petersburg | 33 | (3) |
| 2023 | FC Znamya Truda Orekhovo-Zuyevo | 0 | (0) |

International career
| 2014–2015 | Russia U-17 | 8 | (1) |
- * Club domestic league appearances and goals

Dmitri Igorevich Kirillov (Russian: Дмитрий Игоревич Кириллов; born 16 June 1998) is a Russian former football player.

== Club career ==
He made his debut in the Russian Football National League for FC Zenit-2 Saint Petersburg on 8 July 2017 in a game against FC Shinnik Yaroslavl.
