= 2016–17 FC Orenburg season =

FC Orenburg
2016–17 season
- Chairman: Vasily Stolypin
- Manager: Robert Yevdokimov
- Stadium: Gazovik Stadium
- Premier League: 14th (relegated)
- Russian Cup: Round of 16 vs Krasnodar
- Top goalscorer: League: Blagoy Georgiev (6); All: Blagoy Georgiev (6)
Home colours	Away colours

The 2016–17 FC Orenburg season is the club's first season in the Russian Premier League, the highest tier of association football in Russia.

== Squad ==
Note: Flags indicate national team as defined under FIFA eligibility rules; some limited exceptions apply. Players may hold more than one non-FIFA nationality.

No.	Pos.	Nation	Player
1	GK	RUS	Aleksandr Rudenko
2	DF	RUS	Vladimir Poluyakhtov
3	DF	BLR	Mikhail Sivakow
4	MF	CRO	Ivica Žunić
5	MF	RUS	Roman Vorobyov
8	MF	RUS	Marat Shogenov
9	MF	RUS	Vladimir Parnyakov
10	FW	RUS	Anzor Sanaya
12	DF	RUS	Andrei Malykh
13	MF	BLR	Pavel Nyakhaychyk
15	DF	RUS	Dmitri Andreyev (Captain)
16	FW	SVK	Michal Ďuriš
17	MF	RUS	Dmitri Yefremov
20	MF	RUS	Aleksei Pomerko

No.	Pos.	Nation	Player
22	MF	RUS	Georgy Gabulov
23	MF	RUS	Sergei Breyev
24	MF	RUS	Igor Koronov
27	DF	BLR	Maksim Bardachow
29	MF	UZB	Vadim Afonin
30	GK	BLR	Alyaksandr Hutar
32	MF	SLO	Denis Popović
33	GK	RUS	Dmitry Abakumov
40	MF	BUL	Blagoy Georgiev
41	GK	RUS	Mikhail Kerzhakov
45	FW	GEO	Elguja Lobjanidze
48	MF	RUS	Maksim Grigoryev
50	MF	BLR	Stanislaw Drahun
58	DF	RUS	Adessoye Oyewole

=== On loan ===
Note: Flags indicate national team as defined under FIFA eligibility rules; some limited exceptions apply. Players may hold more than one non-FIFA nationality.

No. / Pos. / Nation / Player; 26 / DF / TJK / Farkhod Vosiyev (at Istiklol until the end of the 2016–17 season)	No. / Pos. / Nation / Player; — / FW / RUS / Artyom Delkin (at Tambov until the end of the 2016–17 season)

=== Reserve squad ===
Note: Flags indicate national team as defined under FIFA eligibility rules; some limited exceptions apply. Players may hold more than one non-FIFA nationality.

No.	Pos.	Nation	Player
7	MF	RUS	Andrei Boyko
14	FW	RUS	Anton Mikhailov
19	MF	RUS	Ilya Altyshev
21	DF	RUS	Pavel Pikin
25	MF	RUS	Denis Makarov
28	DF	RUS	Viktor Cheryazov
35	MF	RUS	Sergei Pikalov
36	DF	RUS	Valentin Prilepin
38	DF	RUS	Daniil Krivoruchko
39	MF	RUS	Denis Fedenko
42	DF	RUS	Maksim Kazachkov
44	MF	RUS	Stepan Oplesnin
55	GK	RUS	Vladislav Trubitsyn
60	MF	RUS	Danila Kozlov
66	MF	RUS	Sergei Mitrenko
69	FW	RUS	Aleksandr Matveychuk

No.	Pos.	Nation	Player
70	MF	RUS	Dinar Khaybullin
71	MF	RUS	Dmitri Rudakov
77	MF	RUS	Dmitry Lesovsky
78	MF	RUS	Ilya Ivanov
80	MF	RUS	Anton Antonenko
81	FW	RUS	Maksim Gribanov
89	MF	RUS	Stanislav Ivanov
91	DF	RUS	Denis Kaykov
92	GK	RUS	Aleksei Kenyaykin
93	FW	RUS	Mikhail Kukushkin
94	DF	RUS	Sergei Kovalyov
96	MF	RUS	Nikita Arsenyev
97	FW	RUS	Andrei Rybkin
98	GK	RUS	Vladislav Dolgopol
99	MF	RUS	Vladislav Kalinin

== Transfers ==
=== Summer ===
In: Note: Flags indicate national team as defined under FIFA eligibility rules; some limited exceptions apply. Players may hold more than one non-FIFA nationality.

No.	Pos.	Nation	Player
4	DF	CRO	Ivica Žunić (from (Ukraine) Volyn Lutsk)
6	MF	CIV	Yacouba Bamba (from (Moldova) Zaria Bălți)
7	MF	RUS	Andrei Boyko (from (Russia) FC Gazovik-2 Orenburg)
10	FW	RUS	Anzor Sanaya (from (Russia) Tom Tomsk)
13	MF	BLR	Pavel Nyakhaychyk (from (Russia) Tom Tomsk)
14	FW	RUS	Anton Mikhailov (from (Russia) FC Gazovik-2 Orenburg)
17	MF	RUS	Dmitri Yefremov (on loan from (Russia) CSKA Moscow)
18	FW	RUS	Aleksandr Prudnikov (from (Russia) Amkar Perm)
19	MF	RUS	Ilya Altyshev (from (Russia) FC Gazovik-2 Orenburg)
20	MF	RUS	Aleksei Pomerko (from (Russia) Krylia Sovetov Samara)
21	DF	RUS	Pavel Pikin (from (Russia) FC Gazovik-2 Orenburg)
22	MF	RUS	Georgy Gabulov (from (Russia) Krylia Sovetov Samara)
28	DF	RUS	Viktor Cheryazov (from (Russia) FC Gazovik-2 Orenburg)
30	GK	BLR	Alyaksandr Hutar (from (Belarus) Dinamo Minsk)
34	MF	RUS	Aleksandr Katsalapov (from (Russia) Ufa)
35	MF	RUS	Sergei Pikalov
36	DF	RUS	Valentin Prilepin
38	DF	RUS	Daniil Krivoruchko (from (Russia) FC Gazovik-2 Orenburg)
40	MF	BUL	Blagoy Georgiev (from (Russia) Rubin Kazan)
44	MF	RUS	Stepan Oplesnin (from (Russia) FC Gazovik-2 Orenburg)
54	DF	RUS	Vadim Bilyukov (from (Russia) FC Gazovik-2 Orenburg)
55	GK	RUS	Vladislav Trubitsyn (from (Russia) FC Gazovik-2 Orenburg)
57	MF	RUS	Vladimir Pereverzev
66	MF	RUS	Sergei Mitrenko (from (Russia) FC Gazovik-2 Orenburg)
69	FW	RUS	Aleksandr Matveychuk (from (Russia) FC Gazovik-2 Orenburg)
70	MF	RUS	Dinar Khaybullin (from (Russia) Mordovia Saransk)
71	MF	RUS	Dmitri Rudakov (from (Russia) FC Gazovik-2 Orenburg)
77	MF	RUS	Dmitry Lesovsky (from (Russia) FC Gazovik-2 Orenburg)
78	MF	RUS	Ilya Ivanov (from (Russia) FC Gazovik-2 Orenburg)
81	FW	RUS	Maksim Gribanov
88	DF	RUS	Maksim Batov (on loan from (Russia) Rubin Kazan)
89	MF	RUS	Stanislav Ivanov (from (Russia) FC Gazovik-2 Orenburg)
91	DF	RUS	Denis Kaykov (from (Russia) LFK Lokomotiv Moscow)
92	GK	RUS	Aleksei Kenyaykin
97	FW	RUS	Andrei Rybkin (from (Russia) FC Gazovik-2 Orenburg)
98	GK	RUS	Vladislav Dolgopol (from (Russia) FC Gazovik-2 Orenburg)
99	MF	RUS	Vladislav Kalinin (from (Russia) FC Gazovik-2 Orenburg)

Out: Note: Flags indicate national team as defined under FIFA eligibility rules; some limited exceptions apply. Players may hold more than one non-FIFA nationality.

No.	Pos.	Nation	Player
3	MF	RUS	Inal Getigezhev (end of loan from (Russia) Rubin Kazan)
4	DF	RUS	Almaz Askarov
7	DF	RUS	Kamalutdin Akhmedov (to (Russia) Tyumen)
11	FW	RUS	Khyzyr Appayev (to (Russia) Arsenal Tula)}
11	FW	RUS	Ivan Markelov (to (Russia) Dynamo Moscow)
17	MF	LAT	Artūrs Zjuzins (to (Russia) Tambov)
22	FW	RUS	Anton Kobyalko (to (Russia) SKA-Khabarovsk)
30	MF	RUS	Aleksei Druzin (to (Russia) SKA-Khabarovsk)
55	GK	RUS	Dmitri Chvanov
87	FW	RUS	Nikita Satalkin (to (Russia) Fakel Voronezh)

=== Winter ===
In: Note: Flags indicate national team as defined under FIFA eligibility rules; some limited exceptions apply. Players may hold more than one non-FIFA nationality.

No.	Pos.	Nation	Player
3	DF	BLR	Mikhail Sivakow (from (Ukraine) Zorya Luhansk)
16	FW	SVK	Michal Ďuriš (from (Czech Republic) Viktoria Plzeň)
25	MF	RUS	Denis Makarov
27	DF	BLR	Maksim Bardachow (on loan from (Russia) Tom Tomsk)
32	MF	SLO	Denis Popović (from (Poland) Wisła Kraków)
39	MF	RUS	Denis Fedenko
41	GK	RUS	Mikhail Kerzhakov (on loan from (Russia) Zenit St. Petersburg)
42	DF	RUS	Maksim Kazachkov
45	FW	GEO	Elguja Lobjanidze (from (Georgia (country)) Dinamo Batumi)
48	MF	RUS	Maksim Grigoryev (on loan from (Russia) Rostov)
50	MF	BLR	Stanislaw Drahun (from (Russia) Dynamo Moscow)
60	MF	RUS	Danila Kozlov
80	MF	RUS	Anton Antonenko
93	FW	RUS	Mikhail Kukushkin
96	MF	RUS	Nikita Arsenyev (from (Russia) Rotor Volgograd academy)
94	DF	RUS	Sergei Kovalyov

Out: Note: Flags indicate national team as defined under FIFA eligibility rules; some limited exceptions apply. Players may hold more than one non-FIFA nationality.

No.	Pos.	Nation	Player
6	MF	CIV	Yacouba Bamba
18	FW	RUS	Aleksandr Prudnikov (to (Russia) Anzhi Makhachkala)
26	DF	TJK	Farkhod Vosiyev (loan to (Tajikistan) Istiklol)
34	MF	RUS	Aleksandr Katsalapov
54	DF	RUS	Vadim Bilyukov (to (Russia) Nosta Novotroitsk)
57	MF	RUS	Vladimir Pereverzev
75	FW	RUS	Samat Sarsenov
88	DF	RUS	Maksim Batov (end of loan from (Russia) Rubin Kazan)
90	FW	RUS	Artyom Delkin (on loan to (Russia) Tambov)

== Competitions ==
=== Russian Premier League ===
==== Results by round ====
Round	1	2	3	4	5	6	7	8	9	10	11	12	13	14	15	16	17	18	19	20	21	22	23	24	25	26	27	28	29	30
Ground	A	H	H	A	H	H	H	H	A	H	A	H	A	H	A	A	A	H	A	A	A	A	H	A	H	A	H	A	H	H
Result	L	L	D	D	D	D	L	L	L	W	L	W	D	D	L	L	L	W	D	L	L	L	W	W	L	D	W	L	D	W
Position	13	16	15	15	15	15	15	15	16	15	15	12	12	12	12	14	14	13	13	13	14	15	14	13	13	13	13	13	14	13

Updated to match(es) played on 21 May 2017. Source: See Results
A = Away; H = Home; W = Win; D = Draw; L = Loss

==== Matches ====
30 July 2016 1	Rostov	1 – 0	Orenburg	Rostov-on-Don
23:30 YEKT (UTC+5)	Novoseltsev 83'; Kalachou (yellow card) 88'	Report	Afonin (yellow card) 59'; Shogenov (yellow card) 67'; Poluyakhtov (yellow card) 82' (yellow-red card) 85'	Stadium: Olimp-2; Attendance: 6,000; Referee: Alexey Nikolaev

7 August 2016 2	Orenburg	0 – 1	CSKA Moscow	Orenburg
15:00 YEKT (UTC+5)	Afonin (yellow card) 57'; Vorobyov (yellow card) 83'	Report	Eremenko 84'; Ignashevich (yellow card) 90+2'	Stadium: Gazovik Stadium; Attendance: 5,600; Referee: Aleksandr Egorov

15 August 2016 3	Orenburg	0 – 0	Amkar Perm	Orenburg
19:30 YEKT (UTC+5)	Afonin (yellow card) 26'; Pomerko (yellow card) 59'; Sanaya (yellow card) 78'	Report	Shynder (yellow card) 33'; Salugin (yellow card) 73'; Idowu (yellow card) 90+2'	Stadium: Gazovik Stadium; Attendance: 5,083; Referee: Aleksey Eskov

22 August 2016 4	Arsenal Tula	0 – 0	Orenburg	Tula
21:30 YEKT (UTC+5)	Brown (yellow card) 44'; Shevchenko (yellow card) 62'	Report	Pomerko (yellow card) 34'; Malykh (yellow card) 50' (yellow-red card) 68'; Vorobyov (yellow card) 56'	Stadium: Arsenal Stadium; Attendance: 10,900; Referee: Mikhail Vilkov

27 August 2016 5	Orenburg	1 – 1	Rubin Kazan	Orenburg
15:00 YEKT (UTC+5)	Sanaya (yellow card) 23'; Katsalapov (yellow card) 38'; Yefremov 45+1'; Afonin (yellow card) 66'; Markelov (yellow card) 90+3'	Report	Bauer (yellow card) 26'; Kanunnikov 90+1'	Stadium: Gazovik Stadium; Attendance: 5,825; Referee: Sergei Karasev

10 September 2016 6	Orenburg	0 – 0	Anzhi Makhachkala	Orenburg
20:00 YEKT (UTC+5)	Georgiev (yellow card) 61'; Oyewole (yellow card) 75'	Report	Mensah (yellow card) 10'; Obertan (yellow card) 57'	Stadium: Gazovik Stadium; Attendance: 5,012; Referee: Artem Chistyakov

16 September 2016 7	Orenburg	1 – 3	Spartak Moscow	Orenburg
19:00 YEKT (UTC+5)	Andreyev (yellow card) 39'; Prudnikov (yellow card) 39'; Georgiev 41' (pen.) (yellow card) 90+1'; Vorobyov (yellow card) 59'; Afonin (yellow card) 85'	Report	Promes 2', 66'; Zé Luís (yellow card) 39'; Rômulo (yellow card) 39'; Ananidze 69'; Popov (yellow card) 89'; Kombarov (yellow card) 90+1'	Stadium: Gazovik Stadium; Attendance: 7,043; Referee: Vladimir Seldyakov

25 September 2016 8	Orenburg	0 – 1	Ural Yekaterinburg	Orenburg
14:00 YEKT (UTC+5)	Bamba (yellow card) 45+1'; Batov (yellow card) 90'	Report	Fidler (yellow card) 45+1'; Pavlyuchenko 60'	Stadium: Gazovik Stadium; Attendance: 5,000; Referee: Mikhail Vilkov

1 October 2016 9	Terek Grozny	2 – 1	Orenburg	Grozny
21:30 YEKT (UTC+5)	Semyonov (yellow card) 17'; Balaj 25'; Roshi (yellow card) 53'; Lebedenko 86'	Report	Vosiyev (yellow card) 27'; Oyewole (yellow card) 42'; Georgiev 90+3' (pen.)	Stadium: Akhmat-Arena; Attendance: 12,320; Referee: Sergey Karasev

16 October 2016 10	Orenburg	3 – 1	Tom Tomsk	Orenburg
18:30 YEKT (UTC+5)	Nyakhaychyk 12', 42', 90+2'; Pomerko (yellow card) 76'	Report	Vranješ (yellow card) 41'; Bicfalvi 77'; Solosin (yellow card) 90+1'	Stadium: Gazovik Stadium; Attendance: 4,416; Referee: Roman Galimov

24 October 2016 11	Zenit St.Petersburg	1 – 0	Orenburg	Saint Petersburg
21:30 YEKT (UTC+5)	Mak 17'; García (yellow card) 68'; Yusupov (yellow card) 81'	Report	Koronov (yellow card) 42'; Vorobyov (yellow card) 85'	Stadium: Petrovsky Stadium; Attendance: 17,685; Referee: Alexey Nikolaev

31 October 2016 12	Orenburg	1 – 0	Krylia Sovetov	Orenburg
19:00 YEKT (UTC+5)	Delkin 62'; Andreyev (yellow card) 89'; Hutar (yellow card) 90+1'	Report	Bozhin (yellow card) 33'; Chochiyev (yellow card) 45+1'	Stadium: Gazovik Stadium; Attendance: 3,750; Referee: Igor Fedotov

6 November 2016 13	Krasnodar	3 – 3	Orenburg	Krasnodar
21:30 YEKT (UTC+5)	Pereyra 9'; Ari 11'; Kaleshin (yellow card) 20'; Eboue (red card) 44'; Martynovich 75'	Report	Breyev 16'; Andreyev (yellow card) 19'; Poluyakhtov 21', 31'; Malykh (red card) 73'; Hutar (yellow card) 90+2'; Vorobyov (yellow card) 90+3'; Katsalapov (yellow card) 90+4'	Stadium: Krasnodar Stadium; Attendance: 22,415; Referee: Vitaly Meshkov

19 November 2016 14	Orenburg	1 – 1	Lokomotiv Moscow	Orenburg
16:30 YEKT (UTC+5)	Nyakhaychyk 59'; Andreyev (yellow card) 85'	Report	Kasaev 25'; Al.Miranchuk (yellow card) 69'; Maicon (yellow card) 88'	Stadium: Gazovik Stadium; Attendance: 5,622; Referee: Kirill Levnikov

25 November 2016 15	Ufa	1 – 0	Orenburg	Ufa
19:00 YEKT (UTC+5)	Sysuyev (yellow card) 20'; Vaněk 39'; Igboun (yellow card) 44'; Marcinho (yellow card) 90+4'	Report	Poluyakhtov (yellow card) 38'; Afonin (yellow card) 44'; Vorobyov (yellow card) 89'	Stadium: Neftyanik Stadium; Attendance: 5,350; Referee: Vladimir Moskalyov

30 November 2016 16	CSKA Moscow	2 – 0	Orenburg	Moscow
21:30 YEKT (UTC+5)	Natkho 26' (pen.); Tošić (yellow card) 53'; Ignashevich (yellow card) 68' (goal) 79'	Report	Pomerko (yellow card) 20'; Andreyev (yellow card) 59' (yellow-red card) 74'	Stadium: Arena CSKA; Attendance: 5,000; Referee: Sergey Ivanov

5 December 2016 17	Amkar Perm	3 – 0	Orenburg	Perm
16:00 YEKT (UTC+5)	Žunić 21' (o.g.); Zaytsev (yellow card) 25'; Prokofyev (yellow card) 29'; Idowu 35'; Zanev (yellow card) 80'; Dzhikiya (yellow card) 89'; Gigolayev 90+3'	Report	Koronov (yellow card) 31'; Malykh (yellow card) 84'	Stadium: Zvezda Stadium; Attendance: 4,250; Referee: Igor Fedotov

4 March 2017 18	Orenburg	3 – 0	Arsenal Tula	Orenburg
16:00 YEKT (UTC+5)	Georgiev 3', 21' (pen.); Grigoryev (yellow card) 12'; Vorobyov 50'; Poluyakhtov (yellow card) 74'	Report	Gorbatenko (yellow card) 36'; Burmistrov (yellow card) 70'	Stadium: Gazovik Stadium; Attendance: 4,232; Referee: Vladimir Seldyakov

11 March 2017 19	Rubin Kazan	0 – 0	Orenburg	Kazan
18:30 YEKT (UTC+5)	Kambolov (yellow card) 15'; Zambrano (yellow card) 30'; Kanunnikov (yellow card) 90'	Report	Ďuriš (yellow card) 60'; Malykh (yellow card) 74'; Sivakow (yellow card) 78'	Stadium: Kazan Arena; Attendance: 3,459; Referee: Aleksei Matyunin

17 March 2017 20	Anzhi Makhachkala	1 – 0	Orenburg	Kaspiysk
20:00 YEKT (UTC+5)	Asildarov (yellow card) 12'; Prudnikov 79' (yellow card) 80'	Report	Sivakow (yellow card) 49'	Stadium: Anzhi Arena; Attendance: 7,100; Referee: Vladislav Bezborodov

3 April 2017 21	Spartak Moscow	3 – 2	Orenburg	Moscow
21:30 YEKT (UTC+5)	Zobnin 34', 58'; Samedov (yellow card) 39'; Promes 90+5'	Report	Popović 70'; Ďuriš 71'	Stadium: Otkrytiye Arena; Attendance: 25,694; Referee: Arten Chistyakov

10 April 2017 22	Ural Yekaterinburg	2 – 0	Orenburg	Yekaterinburg
19:30 YEKT (UTC+5)	Novikov (yellow card) 21'; Ilyin 26'; Fidler (yellow card) 82'; Lungu 90'	Report	Poluyakhtov (yellow card) 25'; Malykh (yellow card) 40'; Georgiev (yellow card) 67'; Oyewole (yellow card) 87'	Stadium: SKB-Bank Arena; Attendance: 3,917; Referee: Evgeny Turbin

16 April 2017 23	Orenburg	2 – 1	Terek Grozny	Orenburg
14:30 YEKT (UTC+5)	Popović 27'; Ďuriš (yellow card) 31'; Pliyev 89' (o.g.)	Report	Ángel (yellow card) 3'; Grozav 73'; Pliyev (yellow card) 79'	Stadium: Gazovik Stadium; Attendance: 5,123; Referee: Aleksey Eskov

23 April 2017 24	Tom Tomsk	1 – 2	Orenburg	Tomsk
14:00 YEKT (UTC+5)	Pugin 36'; Makurin (yellow card) 39'	Report	Drahun (yellow card) 8'; Oyewole 22'; Georgiev 73'	Stadium: Trud Stadium; Attendance: 2,500; Referee: Sergey Karasev

26 April 2017 25	Orenburg	0 – 1	Zenit St.Petersburg	Orenburg
19:00 YEKT (UTC+5)		Report	Giuliano 17' (pen.); Neto (yellow card) 43'; Shatov (yellow card) 60'; Smolnikov (yellow card) 66'; Tsallagov (yellow card) 81'; García (yellow card) 90'	Stadium: Gazovik Stadium; Attendance: 5,543; Referee: Mikhail Vilkov

1 May 2017 26	Krylia Sovetov	1 – 1	Orenburg	Samara
17:30 YEKT (UTC+5)	Yatchenko 85' (pen.)	Report	Georgiev 68'; Malykh (yellow card) 84'	Stadium: Metallurg Stadium; Attendance: 7,915; Referee: Sergey Karasev

7 May 2017 27	Orenburg	1 – 0	Krasnodar	Orenburg
16:00 YEKT (UTC+5)	Parnyakov (yellow card) 40'; Afonin (yellow card) 40'; Lobjanidze 49'; Rudenko (yellow card) 86'	Report	Smolov (yellow card) 38'; Wánderson (yellow card) 39'; Gazinsky (yellow card) 51'	Stadium: Gazovik Stadium; Attendance: 6,805; Referee: Mikhail Vilkov

13 May 2017 28	Lokomotiv Moscow	4 – 0	Orenburg	Moscow
21:30 YEKT (UTC+5)	Tarasov (yellow card) 32'; Ari 37', 50'; Mykhalyk 72'; Fernandes 85'	Report	Georgiev (yellow card) 16'	Stadium: Lokomotiv Stadium; Attendance: 10,177; Referee: Kirill Levnikov

17 May 2017 29	Orenburg	1 – 1	Ufa	Orenburg
19:30 YEKT (UTC+5)	Malykh (yellow card) 67'; Afonin 90'	Report	Paurević (yellow card) 38'; Sukhov (yellow card) 89' (goal) 90+3'	Stadium: Gazovik Stadium; Attendance: 5,226; Referee: Aleksandr Egorov

21 May 2017 30	Orenburg	2 – 0	Rostov	Orenburg
17:00 YEKT (UTC+5)	Lobjanidze (yellow card) 21'; Koronov (yellow card) 22'; Vorobyov 52' (yellow card) 79'; Georgiev (yellow card) 72'; Breyev 75' (yellow card) 78'; Parnyakov (yellow card) 77'; Andreyev (yellow card) 90+2'; Ďuriš (red card) 90+2'	Report	Yerokhin (yellow card) 9'; Kalachev (yellow card) 49'; Terentyev (yellow card) 53'; Azmoun (yellow card) 86'; Gațcan (yellow card) 88'; Kudryashov (yellow card) 90+2'; Noboa (red card) 90+2'	Stadium: Gazovik Stadium; Attendance: 6,952; Referee: Dmitry Safyan

==== League table ====
Pos	Team	Pld	W	D	L	GF	GA	GD	Pts	Qualification or relegation
11	Ural Yekaterinburg	30	8	6	16	24	44	−20	30	
12	Anzhi Makhachkala	30	7	9	14	24	38	−14	30 (Note: Anzhi Makhachkala ahead of Orenburg on head-to-head points; Orenburg–Anzhi Makhachkala 0–0, Anzhi Makhachkala–Orenburg 1–0.)	
13	Orenburg (R)	30	7	9	14	25	36	−11	30	Qualification for the Relegation play-offs
14	Arsenal Tula (O)	30	7	7	16	18	40	−22	28	Qualification for the Relegation play-offs
15	Krylia Sovetov Samara (R)	30	6	10	14	31	39	−8	28	Relegation to Football National League

Source: Russian Premier League, Soccerway
Rules for classification: 1) Points; 2) Matches won; 3) Head-to-head points; 4) Head-to-head matches won; 5) Head-to-head goal difference; 6) Head-to-head goals scored; 7) Head-to-head away goals; 8) Goal difference; 9) Goals scored; 10) Away goals scored.
(O) Play-off winners; (R) Relegated

==== Relegation play-offs ====
25 May 2016 1st Leg	SKA-Khabarovsk	0 – 0	Orenburg	Khabarovsk
21:30 YEKT (UTC+5)	Mikuckis (yellow card) 54'; Udaly (yellow card) 74'	Report	Malykh (yellow card) 61'	Stadium: Lenin Stadium; Attendance: 11,300; Referee: Sergey Lapochkin

27 May 2016 2nd Leg	Orenburg	0 – 0 (a.e.t.) (0 – 0 agg.) (3 – 5 p)	SKA-Khabarovsk	Orenburg
17:00 YEKT (UTC+5)	Ďuriš (yellow card) 27'; Oyewole (yellow card) 70'; Afonin (yellow card) 105'; Malykh (yellow card) 109'	Report	Ediyev (yellow card) 3'; Druzin (yellow card) 38'; Kazankov (yellow card) 39'; Nikiforov (yellow card) 93'; Kobyalko (yellow card) 116'	Stadium: Gazovik Stadium; Attendance: 6,971; Referee: Aleksandr Egorov
	Penalties
	Koronov (penalty scored); Shogenov (penalty scored); Malykh (penalty missed); Sivakow (penalty scored)		(penalty scored) Kazankov; (penalty scored) Kobyalko; (penalty scored) Udaly; (penalty scored) Dedechko; (penalty scored) Koryan

=== Russian Cup ===
21 September 2016 Round of 32	Volgar Astrakhan	0 – 1	Orenburg	Astrakhan
20:00 YEKT (UTC+5)	Zuykov (yellow card) 7' (yellow-red card) 30'; Mashukov (yellow card) 16'	Report	Poluyakhtov (yellow card) 37'; Malykh (yellow card) 63'; Sanaya 80'	Stadium: Central Stadium; Attendance: 2,500; Referee: Igor Fedotov

27 October 2016 Round of 16	Krasnodar	3 – 2 (a.e.t.)	Orenburg	Krasnodar
21:00 YEKT (UTC+5)	Granqvist 58', 100' (yellow card) 99'; Izmailov 67' (yellow card) 97'; Kaboré (yellow card) 76'	Summary	Bamba (yellow card) 26'; Afonin (yellow card) 27'; Breyev 56' (yellow card) 65'; Oyewole 59' (yellow card) 70' (yellow-red card) 106'; Vorobyov (yellow card) 60'; Andreyev (yellow card) 62'; Malykh (yellow card) 102'	Stadium: Krasnodar Stadium; Attendance: 18,236; Referee: Evgeny Turbin

== Squad statistics ==
As of Match played 27 May 2017

=== Appearances and goals ===
No.	Pos	Nat	Player	Total		Premier League		Russian Cup		Playoffs	
No.	Pos	Nat	Player	Apps	Goals	Apps	Goals	Apps	Goals	Apps	Goals
1	GK	(Russia) RUS	Aleksandr Rudenko	9	0	7	0	0	0	2	0
2	DF	(Russia) RUS	Vladimir Poluyakhtov	29	2	25	2	2	0	2	0
3	DF	(Belarus) BLR	Mikhail Sivakow	14	2	12	2	0	0	2	0
4	MF	(Croatia) CRO	Ivica Žunić	3	0	2	0	1	0	0	0
5	MF	(Russia) RUS	Roman Vorobyov	27	0	20+4	0	1	0	2	0
8	MF	(Russia) RUS	Marat Shogenov	8	0	1+5	0	0+1	0	0+1	0
9	MF	(Russia) RUS	Vladimir Parnyakov	11	0	8+1	0	0	0	2	0
10	FW	(Russia) RUS	Anzor Sanaya	19	1	6+11	0	1	1	0+1	0
12	DF	(Russia) RUS	Andrei Malykh	30	0	26	0	1+1	0	2	0
13	MF	(Belarus) BLR	Pavel Nyakhaychyk	19	4	12+4	4	1+1	0	1	0
15	DF	(Russia) RUS	Dmitri Andreyev	22	0	19+2	0	1	0	0	0
16	FW	(Slovakia) SVK	Michal Ďuriš	12	1	10+1	1	0	0	1	0
17	MF	(Russia) RUS	Dmitry Yefremov	21	1	10+10	1	1	0	0	0
20	MF	(Russia) RUS	Aleksei Pomerko	14	0	10+3	0	0+1	0	0	0
23	MF	(Russia) RUS	Sergei Breyev	12	3	4+7	2	1	1	0	0
24	DF	(Russia) RUS	Igor Koronov	21	0	12+5	0	2	0	0+2	0
27	DF	(Belarus) BLR	Maksim Bardachow	1	0	1	0	0	0	0	0
29	MF	(Uzbekistan) UZB	Vadim Afonin	30	1	26	1	2	0	2	0
30	GK	(Belarus) BLR	Alyaksandr Hutar	14	0	12	0	2	0	0	0
32	MF	(Slovenia) SLO	Denis Popović	8	2	3+3	2	0	0	1+1	0
33	GK	(Russia) RUS	Dmitry Abakumov	6	0	6	0	0	0	0	0
40	MF	(Bulgaria) BUL	Blagoy Georgiev	24	6	21	6	1	0	2	0
41	GK	(Russia) RUS	Mikhail Kerzhakov	5	0	5	0	0	0	0	0
45	FW	(Georgia (country)) GEO	Elguja Lobjanidze	13	1	4+7	1	0	0	1+1	0
48	DF	(Russia) RUS	Maksim Grigoryev	10	0	10	0	0	0	0	0
50	MF	(Belarus) BLR	Stanislaw Drahun	11	0	8+3	0	0	0	0	0
58	DF	(Russia) RUS	Adessoye Oyewole	31	3	27	2	2	1	2	0
Players away from the club on loan:
26	DF	(Tajikistan) TJK	Farkhod Vosiyev	1	0	0+1	0	0	0	0	0
90	FW	(Russia) RUS	Artyom Delkin	16	1	8+6	1	0+2	0	0	0
Players who left Orenburg during the season:
6	MF	(Ivory Coast) CIV	Yacouba Bamba	12	0	7+3	0	2	0	0	0
11	FW	(Russia) RUS	Ivan Markelov	4	0	0+4	0	0	0	0	0
18	FW	(Russia) RUS	Aleksandr Prudnikov	4	0	2+2	0	0	0	0	0
34	MF	(Russia) RUS	Aleksandr Katsalapov	9	0	5+3	0	1	0	0	0
88	DF	(Russia) RUS	Maksim Batov	5	0	0+5	0	0	0	0	0

=== Goal scorers ===
Place	Position	Nation	Number	Name	Premier League	Russian Cup	Playoffs	Total
1	MF	(Bulgaria)	40	Blagoy Georgiev	6	0	0	6
2	MF	(Belarus)	13	Pavel Nyakhaychyk	4	0	0	4
3	MF	(Russia)	23	Sergei Breyev	2	1	0	3
4	DF	(Russia)	2	Vladimir Poluyakhtov	2	0	0	2
4	MF	(Russia)	5	Roman Vorobyov	2	0	0	2
4	DF	(Slovenia)	32	Denis Popović	2	0	0	2
4	DF	(Russia)	58	Adessoye Oyewole	1	1	0	2
8	MF	(Russia)	17	Dmitry Yefremov	1	0	0	1
8	FW	(Russia)	90	Artyom Delkin	1	0	0	1
8	FW	(Slovakia)	16	Michal Ďuriš	1	0	0	1
8	FW	(Georgia (country))	45	Elguja Lobjanidze	1	0	0	1
8	MF	(Uzbekistan)	29	Vadim Afonin	1	0	0	1
8	FW	(Russia)	10	Anzor Sanaya	0	1	0	1
8				Own goal	1	0	0	1
				TOTALS	25	3	0	28

=== Disciplinary record ===
Number	Nation	Position	Name	Premier League		Russian Cup		Playoffs		Total	
Number	Nation	Position	Name	Yellow card	Red card	Yellow card	Red card	Yellow card	Red card	Yellow card	Red card
1	(Russia)	GK	Aleksandr Rudenko	1	0	0	0	0	0	1	0
2	(Russia)	DF	Vladimir Poluyakhtov	5	1	1	0	0	0	6	1
3	(Belarus)	DF	Mikhail Sivakow	2	0	0	0	0	0	2	0
5	(Russia)	MF	Roman Vorobyov	7	0	1	0	0	0	8	0
6	(Ivory Coast)	MF	Yacouba Bamba	1	0	1	0	0	0	2	0
8	(Russia)	MF	Marat Shogenov	1	0	0	0	0	0	1	0
9	(Russia)	MF	Vladimir Parnyakov	2	0	0	0	0	0	2	0
10	(Russia)	FW	Anzor Sanaya	2	0	0	0	0	0	2	0
11	(Russia)	FW	Ivan Markelov	1	0	0	0	0	0	1	0
12	(Russia)	DF	Andrei Malykh	7	2	2	0	2	0	11	2
15	(Russia)	DF	Dmitri Andreyev	7	1	1	0	0	0	8	1
16	(Slovakia)	FW	Michal Ďuriš	2	1	0	0	1	0	3	1
18	(Russia)	FW	Aleksandr Prudnikov	1	0	0	0	0	0	1	0
20	(Russia)	MF	Aleksei Pomerko	4	0	0	0	0	0	4	0
23	(Russia)	MF	Sergei Breyev	1	0	1	0	0	0	2	0
24	(Russia)	DF	Igor Koronov	3	0	0	0	0	0	3	0
26	(Tajikistan)	DF	Farkhod Vosiyev	1	0	0	0	0	0	1	0
29	(Uzbekistan)	MF	Vadim Afonin	7	0	1	0	1	0	9	0
30	(Belarus)	GK	Alyaksandr Hutar	2	0	0	0	0	0	2	0
34	(Russia)	MF	Aleksandr Katsalapov	2	0	0	0	0	0	2	0
40	(Bulgaria)	MF	Blagoy Georgiev	4	0	0	0	0	0	4	0
45	(Georgia (country))	FW	Elguja Lobjanidze	1	0	0	0	0	0	1	0
48	(Russia)	DF	Maksim Grigoryev	1	0	0	0	0	0	1	0
50	(Belarus)	MF	Stanislaw Drahun	1	0	0	0	0	0	1	0
58	(Russia)	DF	Adessoye Oyewole	3	0	2	1	1	0	6	1
88	(Russia)	DF	Maksim Batov	1	0	0	0	0	0	1	0
			TOTALS	70	5	10	1	5	0	85	6
