= 2016–17 Russian Premier League =

25th season of top-tier football league in Russia

Russian Premier League
- Season: 2016–17
- Champions: Spartak Moscow; 10th Premier League title 22nd overall title
- Champions League: Spartak Moscow; CSKA Moscow
- Europa League: Lokomotiv Moscow; Zenit St. Petersburg; Krasnodar
- Matches: 240
- Goals: 512 (2.13 per match)
- Top goalscorer: Fyodor Smolov (18 goals)
- Biggest home win: Spartak 4–0 Arsenal; Krasnodar 4–0 Terek; Lokomotiv 4–0 Anzhi; Krylia Sovetov 4–0 Spartak; CSKA 4–0 Ural; CSKA 4–0 Tom; CSKA 4–0 Anzhi
- Biggest away win: Tom 0–6 Rostov
- Highest scoring: Tom 1–6 Lokomotiv
- Longest winning run: 6 matches: Spartak (15 Oct–26 Nov)
- Longest unbeaten run: 13 matches: CSKA (6 Nov–26 Apr)
- Longest winless run: 14 matches: Arsenal (14 Aug–30 Nov)
- Longest losing run: 5 matches: Arsenal (30 Oct–30 Nov); Tom (27 Nov-11 Mar)
- Highest attendance: 44,884; Spartak 3–1 CSKA Moscow (29 October 2016)
- Lowest attendance: 2,950; Tom 1–1 Ural (1 October 2016)
- Average attendance: 11,246

The 2016–17 Russian Premier League was the 25th season of the premier league football competition in Russia since the dissolution of the Soviet Union and the 15th under the current Russian Premier League name. CSKA Moscow came into the season as the defending champions of the 2015-16 season. Fixtures for the 2016–17 season were announced on 20 June 2016.

== Teams ==
Locations of teams in the 2016–17 Russian Premier League
Locations of teams in 2016–17 Russian Premier League (Tomsk)

As in the previous season, 16 teams played in the 2016–17 season. After the 2015–16 season, FC Kuban Krasnodar, FC Dynamo Moscow and FC Mordovia Saransk were relegated to the 2016–17 Russian National Football League. They were replaced by three clubs from the 2015–16 Russian National Football League, FC Arsenal Tula, FC Orenburg and FC Tom Tomsk.

=== Stadiums ===
Team	Stadium	City	Opened	Capacity
Amkar	Zvezda Stadium	Perm	1969	17,000
Anzhi	Anzhi Arena	Kaspiysk	2003	26,400
Arsenal	Arsenal Stadium	Tula	1959	20,048
CSKA	Arena CSKA	Moscow	2016	30,000
Krasnodar	Krasnodar Stadium	Krasnodar	2016	34,291
Krylia Sovetov	Metallurg Stadium	Samara	1957	33,001
Lokomotiv	Lokomotiv Stadium	Moscow	2002	28,800
Orenburg	Gazovik Stadium	Orenburg	2002	7,500
Rostov	Olimp-2	Rostov-on-Don	1930	15,840
Rubin	Kazan Arena	Kazan	2013	45,379
Spartak	Otkrytiye Arena	Moscow	2014	45,360
Terek	Akhmat-Arena	Grozny	2011	30,597
Tom	Trud Stadium	Tomsk	1929	10,028
Ufa	Neftyanik Stadium	Ufa	1967	15,234
Ural	SKB-Bank Arena	Yekaterinburg	1940	10,000
Zenit	Petrovsky	Saint Petersburg	1925	21,405

=== Personnel and sponsorship ===
Team	Location	Head coach
Amkar Perm	Perm	(Russia) Gadzhi Gadzhiyev
Anzhi Makhachkala	Makhachkala	(Russia) Aleksandr Grigoryan
Arsenal Tula	Tula	(Russia) Sergei Kiriakov
CSKA Moscow	Moscow	(Belarus) Viktor Goncharenko
Krasnodar	Krasnodar	(Russia) Igor Shalimov
Krylia Sovetov Samara	Samara	(Belarus) Vadim Skripchenko
Lokomotiv Moscow	Moscow	(Russia) Yuri Semin
Orenburg	Orenburg	(Russia) Robert Yevdokimov
Rostov	Rostov-on-Don	(Moldova) Ivan Daniliants
Rubin Kazan	Kazan	(Spain) Javi Gracia
Spartak Moscow	Moscow	(Italy) Massimo Carrera
Terek Grozny	Grozny	(Tajikistan) Rashid Rakhimov
Tom Tomsk	Tomsk	(Russia) Valery Petrakov
Ufa	Ufa	(Russia) Sergei Semak
Ural Sverdlovsk Oblast	Yekaterinburg	(Russia) Aleksandr Tarkhanov
Zenit Saint Petersburg	Saint Petersburg	(Romania) Mircea Lucescu

=== Managerial changes ===
Team	Outgoing	Manner	Date	Table	Incoming	Date	Table
Zenit	(Portugal) André Villas-Boas	Contract expired	24 May 2016	pre-season	(Romania) Mircea Lucescu	24 May 2016	pre-season
Rubin	(Ukraine) Valeriy Chaly	Contract expired	21 May 2016	pre-season	(Spain) Javi Gracia	27 May 2016	pre-season
Ufa	(Russia) Sergei Tomarov (caretaker)	Caretaking spell over	6 June 2016	pre-season	(Belarus) Viktor Goncharenko	6 June 2016	pre-season
Anzhi	(Uzbekistan) Ruslan Agalarov	Contract expired	31 May 2016	pre-season	(Czech Republic) Pavel Vrba	30 June 2016	pre-season
Spartak	(Russia) Dmitri Alenichev	Resigned	5 August 2016	1st	(Italy) Massimo Carrera (caretaker) (Italy) Massimo Carrera	5 August 2016 permanent since 17 August 2016	1st 2nd
Rostov	(Turkmenistan) Kurban Berdyev	Resigned	6 August 2016	4th	(Russia) Dmitri Kirichenko (caretaker)	6 August 2016	4th
Lokomotiv	(Tajikistan) Igor Cherevchenko	Resigned	10 August 2016	9th	(Uzbekistan) Oleg Pashinin (caretaker)	10 August 2016	9th
Lokomotiv	(Uzbekistan) Oleg Pashinin (caretaker)	Caretaking spell over	26 August 2016	12th	(Russia) Yuri Semin	26 August 2016	12th
Rostov	(Russia) Dmitri Kirichenko (caretaker)	Caretaking spell over	9 September 2016	7th	(Austria) Ivan Daniliants	9 September 2016	7th
Krasnodar	(Russia) Oleg Kononov	Resigned	13 September 2016	7th	(Russia) Igor Shalimov (caretaker) (Russia) Igor Shalimov	13 September 2016 permanent since 6 October 2016	7th 6th
Arsenal Tula	(Russia) Sergei Pavlov	Mutual consent	5 October 2016	14th	(Russia) Andrei Kozlov (caretaker)	5 October 2016	14th
Arsenal Tula	(Russia) Andrei Kozlov (caretaker)	Caretaking spell over	6 October 2016	14th	(Russia) Sergei Kiriakov	6 October 2016	14th
Ural Sverdlovsk Oblast	(Belarus) Vadim Skripchenko	Resigned	1 November 2016	13th	(Russia) Yuri Matveyev (caretaker)	1 November 2016	13th
Krylia Sovetov	(Belgium) Franky Vercauteren	Mutual consent	1 November 2016	16th	(Netherlands) Hans Visser (caretaker)	1 November 2016	16th
Krylia Sovetov	(Netherlands) Hans Visser (caretaker)	Caretaking spell over	3 November 2016	16th	(Belarus) Vadim Skripchenko	3 November 2016	16th
Ural Sverdlovsk Oblast	(Russia) Yuri Matveyev (caretaker)	Caretaking spell over	3 November 2016	13th	(Russia) Aleksandr Tarkhanov	3 November 2016	13th
CSKA Moscow	(Russia) Leonid Slutsky	Resigned	7 December 2016	3rd	(Belarus) Viktor Goncharenko	12 December 2016	3rd
Ufa	(Belarus) Viktor Goncharenko	Mutual consent	12 December 2016	8th	(Russia) Sergei Semak	30 December 2016	8th
Anzhi Makhachkala	(Czech Republic) Pavel Vrba	Mutual consent	30 December 2016	11th	(Armenia) Aleksandr Grigoryan	5 January 2017	11th

== Tournament format and regulations ==
=== Basic ===
The 16 teams played a round-robin tournament whereby each team plays each one of the other teams twice, once at home and once away. Thus, a total of 240 matches was played, with 30 matches played by each team.

=== Promotion and relegation ===
The teams that finish 15th and 16th will be relegated to the FNL, while the top 2 in that league will be promoted to the Premier League for the 2016–17 season.

The 13th and 14th Premier League teams will play the 4th and 3rd FNL teams respectively in two playoff games with the winners securing Premier League spots for the 2017–18 season.

== League table ==
Pos	Team	Pld	W	D	L	GF	GA	GD	Pts	Qualification or relegation
1	Spartak Moscow (C)	30	22	3	5	46	27	+19	69	Qualification for the Champions League group stage
2	CSKA Moscow	30	18	8	4	47	15	+32	62	Qualification for the Champions League third qualifying round
3	Zenit Saint Petersburg	30	18	7	5	50	19	+31	61	Qualification for the Europa League third qualifying round
4	Krasnodar	30	12	13	5	40	22	+18	49	Qualification for the Europa League third qualifying round
5	Terek Grozny	30	14	6	10	38	35	+3	48	
6	Rostov	30	13	9	8	36	18	+18	48	
7	Ufa	30	12	7	11	22	25	−3	43	
8	Lokomotiv Moscow	30	10	12	8	39	27	+12	42	Qualification for the Europa League group stage (Note: Lokomotiv Moscow qualified for the Europa League group stage by winning the 2016–17 Russian Cup.)
9	Rubin Kazan	30	10	8	12	30	34	−4	38	
10	Amkar Perm	30	8	11	11	25	29	−4	35	
11	Ural Yekaterinburg	30	8	6	16	24	44	−20	30	
12	Anzhi Makhachkala	30	7	9	14	24	38	−14	30 (Note: Anzhi Makhachkala ahead of Orenburg on head-to-head points; Orenburg–Anzhi Makhachkala 0–0, Anzhi Makhachkala–Orenburg 1–0.)	
13	Orenburg (R)	30	7	9	14	25	36	−11	30	Qualification for the Relegation play-offs
14	Arsenal Tula (O)	30	7	7	16	18	40	−22	28	Qualification for the Relegation play-offs
15	Krylia Sovetov Samara (R)	30	6	10	14	31	39	−8	28	Relegation to Football National League
16	Tom Tomsk (R)	30	3	5	22	17	64	−47	14	Relegation to Football National League

Source: Russian Premier League, Soccerway
Rules for classification: 1) Points; 2) Matches won; 3) Head-to-head points; 4) Head-to-head matches won; 5) Head-to-head goal difference; 6) Head-to-head goals scored; 7) Head-to-head away goals; 8) Goal difference; 9) Goals scored; 10) Away goals scored.
(C) Champions; (O) Play-off winners; (R) Relegated

== Relegation play-offs ==
The draw for relegation play-offs scheduling took place on 24 April 2017.

=== First leg ===
25 May 2017
12:00 UTC+3

SKA-Khabarovsk	0–0	Orenburg
	Report

Lenin Stadium, Khabarovsk
Attendance: 11,300
Referee: Sergey Lapochkin (St. Petersburg)

25 May 2017
15:30 UTC+3

Yenisey Krasnoyarsk	2–1	Arsenal Tula
Aleksandrov 11' (o.g.); Maloyan 90+1'	Report	72' Kombarov

Central Stadium, Krasnoyarsk
Attendance: 14,000
Referee: Vladislav Bezborodov (St. Petersburg)

=== Second leg ===
28 May 2017
15:00 UTC+3

Orenburg	0–0 (a.e.t.)	SKA-Khabarovsk
	Report
Penalties
Koronov (penalty scored); Shogenov (penalty scored); Malykh (penalty missed); Sivakow (penalty scored)	3–5	(penalty scored) Kazankov; (penalty scored) Kobyalko; (penalty scored) Udaly; (penalty scored) Dedechko; (penalty scored) Koryan

Gazovik Stadium, Orenburg
Attendance: 6,971
Referee: Alexander Yegorov (Saransk)

0–0 on aggregate. SKA-Khabarovsk won 5–3 on penalties and were promoted to the 2017–18 Russian Premier League; Orenburg were relegated to the 2017–18 Russian National Football League.

28 May 2017
18:00 UTC+3

Arsenal Tula	1–0	Yenisey Krasnoyarsk
Shevchenko 29'	Report

Arsenal Stadium, Tula
Attendance: 13,400
Referee: Vladimir Seldiakov (Balashikha)

2–2 on aggregate. Arsenal Tula won on away goals and retained their spot in the 2017–18 Russian Premier League; Yenisey Krasnoyarsk remained in the 2017–18 Russian National Football League.

== Results ==
Home \ Away	AMK	ANZ	ARS	CSK	KRA	KRY	LOK	ORE	ROS	RUB	SPA	TER	TOM	UFA	URA	ZEN
Amkar Perm	—	2–0	1–0	0–2	0–2	0–0	0–0	3–0	1–0	1–2	0–1	1–1	1–0	1–1	1–0	1–0
Anzhi Makhachkala	3–1	—	1–0	0–0	0–0	1–3	0–0	1–0	1–2	0–1	0–2	0–0	3–3	0–1	2–3	2–2
Arsenal Tula	0–0	1–0	—	0–1	0–0	2–0	0–3	0–0	1–0	1–0	3–0	0–0	3–0	0–2	2–0	0–5
CSKA Moscow	2–2	4–0	3–0	—	1–1	2–1	4–0	2–0	0–0	0–0	1–2	3–0	4–0	1–0	4–0	0–0
Krasnodar	1–0	0–0	2–0	1–1	—	1–1	1–2	3–3	2–1	1–0	2–2	4–0	3–0	0–0	3–0	2–1
Krylia Sovetov Samara	2–2	2–1	1–1	1–2	1–1	—	0–3	1–1	0–0	0–0	4–0	1–3	3–0	0–1	2–2	1–3
Lokomotiv Moscow	3–3	4–0	1–1	1–0	1–2	0–0	—	4–0	0–0	0–1	1–1	2–0	2–2	0–1	1–1	0–2
Orenburg	0–0	0–0	3–0	0–1	1–0	1–0	1–1	—	2–0	1–1	1–3	2–1	3–1	1–1	0–1	0–1
Rostov	1–0	2–0	4–1	2–0	0–0	2–1	1–0	1–0	—	4–2	3–0	0–0	3–0	1–0	0–0	0–0
Rubin Kazan	0–0	1–2	1–0	0–2	0–1	3–0	2–0	0–0	0–0	—	1–1	0–1	2–1	2–1	3–1	0–2
Spartak Moscow	1–0	1–0	4–0	3–1	2–0	1–0	1–0	3–2	1–0	2–1	—	3–0	1–0	0–1	1–0	2–1
Terek Grozny	1–3	0–1	3–1	0–1	2–1	1–0	1–1	2–1	2–1	3–1	0–1	—	0–0	0–1	5–2	2–1
Tom Tomsk	1–0	0–3	1–0	0–1	1–5	0–2	1–6	1–2	0–6	2–2	0–1	1–2	—	1–0	1–1	0–2
Ufa	1–1	2–1	1–0	0–2	0–0	1–0	0–1	1–0	0–0	2–3	1–3	1–3	1–0	—	1–0	0–0
Ural Yekaterinburg	1–0	0–1	1–1	0–1	1–1	1–3	1–2	2–0	1–0	1–0	0–1	1–4	1–0	2–0	—	0–2
Zenit Saint Petersburg	3–0	1–1	2–0	1–1	1–0	3–1	0–0	1–0	3–2	4–1	4–2	0–1	1–0	2–0	2–0	—

Source: Russian Premier League
Legend: Blue = home team win; Yellow = draw; Red = away team win.
For upcoming matches, an "a" indicates there is an article about the rivalry between the two participants.

=== Positions by round ===
The table lists the positions of teams after each week of matches. In order to preserve chronological evolvements, any postponed matches are not included to the round at which they were originally scheduled, but added to the full round they were played immediately afterwards.

Team ╲ Round	1	2	3	4	5	6	7	8	9	10	11	12	13	14	15	16	17	18	19	20	21	22	23	24	25	26	27	28	29	30
Spartak Moscow	1	2	2	1	1	1	1	1	1	1	1	1	1	1	1	1	1	1	1	1	1	1	1	1	1	1	1	1	1	1
CSKA Moscow	6	6	3	3	2	2	2	2	3	3	3	3	4	3	4	3	3	3	2	2	2	2	2	2	2	3	2	2	2	2
Zenit St. Petersburg	7	10	5	8	4	3	3	3	2	2	2	2	2	2	2	2	2	2	3	3	3	3	3	3	3	2	3	3	3	3
Krasnodar	2	1	1	4	6	7	5	6	6	6	4	5	5	5	3	5	5	4	4	4	4	4	4	4	4	4	4	4	5	4
Terek Grozny	5	7	10	7	3	5	7	8	7	7	5	4	3	4	5	4	4	5	7	8	8	5	6	8	6	6	5	5	6	5
Rostov	4	4	7	5	7	6	8	5	4	5	6	7	7	6	6	6	7	7	8	7	7	8	9	5	5	5	6	6	4	6
Ufa	14	12	16	16	13	13	9	9	9	10	9	9	10	9	8	9	8	6	5	5	5	6	7	7	9	7	7	7	8	7
Lokomotiv Moscow	8	9	12	12	9	9	11	13	13	12	11	11	11	11	11	11	10	10	10	10	9	9	5	6	7	8	8	8	7	8
Rubin Kazan	9	11	13	13	14	10	12	10	10	9	10	10	8	8	9	8	9	9	9	9	10	10	11	11	11	10	9	9	9	9
Amkar Perm	10	5	4	2	5	4	4	4	5	4	7	6	6	7	7	7	6	8	6	6	6	7	8	9	8	9	10	10	10	10
Ural Sverdlovsk Oblast	3	3	6	9	11	11	14	11	11	11	12	13	13	13	13	12	13	12	12	12	11	11	10	10	10	12	12	11	11	11
Anzhi Makhachkala	11	13	8	6	8	8	6	7	8	8	8	8	9	10	10	10	11	11	11	11	12	12	12	12	12	11	11	12	12	12
Orenburg	13	16	15	15	15	15	15	15	16	15	15	12	12	12	12	14	14	13	13	13	14	15	14	13	13	13	13	13	14	13
Arsenal Tula	16	8	11	10	10	12	13	14	14	14	13	14	14	15	16	16	15	15	14	15	13	13	15	15	14	15	15	15	15	14
Krylia Sovetov Samara	12	15	14	14	16	16	16	16	15	16	16	16	16	16	14	13	12	14	15	14	15	14	13	14	15	14	14	14	13	15
Tom Tomsk	15	14	9	11	12	14	10	12	12	13	14	15	15	14	15	15	16	16	16	16	16	16	16	16	16	16	16	16	16	16

Source: resultados-futbol.com

== Season statistics ==
=== Scoring ===
- First goal of the season: Ivan Novoseltsev for Rostov against Orenburg (30 July 2016)
- First double: Jano Ananidze for Spartak Moscow against Arsenal Tula (31 July 2016)
- First hat-trick: Pavel Nyakhaychyk for Orenburg against Tom Tomsk (16 October 2016)

=== Top goalscorers ===
Rank	Player	Team	Goals
1	(Russia) Fyodor Smolov	Krasnodar	18
2	(Russia) Artem Dzyuba	Zenit	13
3	(Netherlands) Quincy Promes	Spartak	12
4	(Brazil) Ari	Krasnodar/Lokomotiv	10
5	(Brazil) Jonathas	Rubin	9
5	(Albania) Bekim Balaj	Terek	9
7	(Russia) Denis Glushakov	Spartak	8
7	(Belarus) Sergei Kornilenko	Krylia Sovetov	8
7	(Brazil) Victor Giuliano	Zenit	8
10	(Senegal) Ablaye Mbengue	Terek	7
10	(Portugal) Manuel Fernandes	Lokomotiv	7
10	(Russia) Maksim Kanunnikov	Rubin	7
10	(Russia) Aleksandr Samedov	Lokomotiv/Spartak	7
10	(Russia) Dmitry Poloz	Rostov	7
10	(Iran) Sardar Azmoun	Rostov	7

Last updated: 28 May 2017

== Season events ==
=== Transfer bans ===
On 3 November 2016, FC Tom Tomsk was banned from registering new players for debts to PFC CSKA Moscow for Pyotr Ten's transfer fee. On 27 December 2016, the ban was re-confirmed for debts to a former player Andrei Lyakh. On 19 January 2017, the ban was re-confirmed for debts to player Sergey Kuznetsov and former players Maksim Tishkin, Artyom Yarmolitsky, Aslan Dudiyev, Aleksandr Zhirov, Sergey Samodin, Vitali Dyakov, Anton Kochenkov and Pyotr Ten. On 31 January 2017, the ban was re-confirmed for debts to former players Oleksandr Kasyan and Pavel Golyshev. On 10 February 2017, the ban was re-confirmed for debts to former players Pavel Golyshev and Kirill Pogrebnyak. On 20 February 2017, the ban was re-confirmed for debts to players Aleksei Pugin, Artyom Popov and Kirill Kombarov. By the time the winter player registration window closed on 24 February 2017, the ban remained as place. Most of the players who represented Tom in games played in 2016 left the club as free agents due to non-payment of wages, and as a result, Tom were forced to play out the 2017 games remaining on their schedule with the players registered for their Under-21 squad.

On 16 November 2016, FC Rubin Kazan was banned from registering new players for debts to former player Shota Bibilov. On 23 December 2016, the ban was re-confirmed for debts to player Ruslan Kambolov. On 17 February 2017, the ban was removed.

On 19 December 2016, FC Krylia Sovetov Samara, FC Tom Tomsk, FC Amkar Perm and FC Rubin Kazan were banned from registering new players by the licensing committee of the Russian Football Union for unspecified debts. Krylia Sovetov's ban was removed on 30 January 2017.

== Attendances ==
Pos	Team	Total	High	Low	Average	Change
1	Spartak Moscow	491,404	44,884	17,449	32,760	+30.1%
2	Zenit	278,354	30,673	15,813	18,557	+10.4%^{1}
3	Krasnodar	259,834	31,854	5,200	17,322	+58.4%^{2}
4	Terek Grozny	228,454	18,783	11,200	15,230	−6.3%
5	CSKA Moscow	216,806	27,352	5,000	14,454	+50.7%^{3}
6	Arsenal Tula	163,807	18,500	4,597	10,920	+67.4%^{4}
7	Lokomotiv Moscow	157,991	27,402	6,114	10,533	+7.2%
8	Rostov	153,770	14,800	6,000	10,251	−23.1%
9	Rubin Kazan	144,759	21,405	3,041	9,651	−18.7%^{5}
10	Amkar Perm	107,340	12,300	4,150	7,156	−10.8%
11	Krylia Sovetov	104,841	18,753	1,055	6,989	−37.2%^{6}
12	Ufa	102,164	12,300	3,152	6,811	−3.5%^{7}
13	Anzhi Makhachkala	101,603	16,500	2,100	6,774	−32.1%
14	Orenburg	81,232	7,043	3,750	5,415	+126.1%^{4}
15	Ural Yekaterinburg	79,783	8,800	2,340	5,319	−4.2%
16	Tom Tomsk	67,382	8,283	2,100	4,492	+63.3%^{8}
	League total	2,739,524	44,884	1,055	11,415	+3.4%

Notes:
1: Zenit played two of their home matches at Krestovsky Stadium.
2: Krasnodar played their first five home matches of the season at Kuban Stadium.
3: CSKA Moscow played last season at Arena Khimki.
4: Team played last season in the Russian Football National League.
5: Rubin Kazan played six of its home matches at Central Stadium and played eight of its home matches there last season.
6: Krylia Sovetov played one of their home matches at a Neftyanik Stadium and played three of their home matches last season at Start Stadium.
7: Ufa played one of its home matches last season at Start Stadium.
8: Tom Tomsk played its home matches against Rostov and Lokomotiv Moscow at the away team's stadium and played last season in the Russian Football National League.

== Awards ==
=== Top 33 ===
On 22 May 2017, Russian Football Union named its list of 33 top players:

Goalkeepers

1. (Russia) Igor Akinfeev (CSKA)
2. (Russia) Artyom Rebrov (Spartak)
3. (Russia) Gulherme (Lokomotiv)

Right backs

1. (Russia) Mário Fernandes (CSKA)
2. (Russia) Igor Smolnikov (Zenit)
3. (Russia) Vitali Kaleshin (Krasnodar)

Right-centre backs

1. (Russia) Vasili Berezutski (CSKA)
2. (Croatia) Vedran Ćorluka (Lokomotiv)
3. (Germany) Serdar Tasci (Spartak)

Left-centre backs

1. (Spain) César Navas (Rostov)
2. (Russia) Georgi Dzhikiya (Amkar/Spartak)
3. (Russia) Fyodor Kudryashov (Rostov)

Left backs

1. (Russia) Dmitri Kombarov (Spartak)
2. (Uzbekistan) Vitaliy Denisov (Lokomotiv)
3. (Italy) Domenico Criscito (Zenit)

Defensive midfielders

1. (Brazil) Fernando (Spartak)
2. (Ecuador) Christian Noboa (Rostov)
3. (Sweden) Pontus Wernbloom (CSKA)

Right midfielders

1. (Netherlands) Quincy Promes (Spartak)
2. (Belarus) Timofei Kalachev (Rostov)
3. (Russia) Aleksandr Samedov (Lokomotiv/Spartak)

Centre midfielders

1. (Russia) Denis Glushakov (Spartak)
2. (Russia) Alan Dzagoev (CSKA)
3. (Russia) Aleksandr Golovin (CSKA)

Left midfielders

1. (Russia) Roman Zobnin (Spartak)
2. (Russia) Yuri Zhirkov (Zenit)
3. (Russia) Oleg Shatov (Zenit)

Right forwards

1. (Russia) Artem Dzyuba (Zenit)
2. (Cape Verde) Zé Luís (Spartak)
3. (Russia) Aleksandr Bukharov (Rostov)

Left forwards

1. (Russia) Fyodor Smolov (Krasnodar)
2. (Russia) Dmitry Poloz (Rostov)
3. (Russia) Aleksei Miranchuk (Lokomotiv)

Other awards announced on the same day included:

Player of the year: Denis Glushakov.

Hope prize (under-21 players): Fyodor Chalov (CSKA).

Coach of the year: Massimo Carrera (Spartak).

Referee of the year: Vladislav Bezborodov.

Team of the year: FC Spartak Moscow.

For contribution to football development: Nikita Simonyan.
