= Aleksandr Rudenko =

Aleksandr Rudenko may refer to:

- Aleksandr Rudenko (footballer, born 1993), Russian football player
- Aleksandr Rudenko (footballer, born 1999), Russian football player
