= Yevgeni Falkovskiy =

Russian footballer

Personal information
- Full name: Yevgeni Aleksandrovich Falkovskiy
- Date of birth: 4 May 1985 (age 41)
- Place of birth: Krasnoyarsk, Russian SFSR
- Height: 1.73 m (5 ft 8 in)
- Position: Midfielder

Team information
- Current team: FC Rassvet Krasnoyarsk (assistant coach)

Youth career
- 1992–2000: Rotor Krasnoyarsk
- 2001–2002: FC Torpedo Moscow

Senior career*
Years	Team	Apps	(Gls)
2001–2005	FC Torpedo Moscow	0	(0)
2006	FC Volga Tver	34	(1)
2007	FC Torpedo Vladimir	27	(5)
2008–2010	FC Volga Tver	86	(3)
2011–2014	FC Zvezda Ryazan	88	(7)
2014–2015	FC Restavratsiya Krasnoyarsk		
2016–2019	FC Rassvet Krasnoyarsk		

Managerial career
- 2016–2019: FC Rassvet Krasnoyarsk (youth)
- 2019–: FC Rassvet Krasnoyarsk (assistant)
- * Club domestic league appearances and goals

Yevgeni Aleksandrovich Falkovskiy (Russian: Евгений Александрович Фальковский; born 4 May 1985) is a Russian professional football coach and a former player. He is an assistant coach with FC Rassvet Krasnoyarsk.

== Club career ==
He made his debut for FC Torpedo Moscow on 6 March 2005 in a Russian Cup game against FC Metallurg Lipetsk.
