= Prilepin =

Prilepin (masculine, Russian: Прилепин) or Prilepina (feminine, Russian: Прилепина) is a Russian surname. Notable people with the surname include:

- Valentin Prilepin (born 1999), Russian soccer player
- Zakhar Prilepin (born 1975), Russian journalist, politician, writer and paramilitary.
