= Danila Kozlov =

Danila Kozlov may refer to:

- Danila Kozlov (footballer, born 1997), Russian football defender for Leningradets Leningrad Oblast
- Danila Kozlov (footballer, born 2005), Russian football midfielder for CSKA Moscow
