= Andrei Kozlov (disambiguation) =

Andrey Kozlov (1965 – 2006) was a Russian banker.

Andrei Kozlov may also refer to:

- Andrei Kozlov (footballer, born 1973), Russian football player and manager
- Andrei Kozlov (footballer, born 1989), Russian football player
- Andrey Valerievich Kozlov (born 1982), Russian weightlifter
- Andrey Anatolyevich Kozlov (born 1960) producer of the show What? Where? When?
- Andrey Kozlov (born 1995 or 1996), a Russian-Israeli who was taken hostage by Hamas and rescued in the 2024 Nuseirat rescue operation
