= Ansor Khabibov =

Russian footballer (born 2003)

Personal information
- Full name: Ansor Mukhamaddovudovich Khabibov
- Date of birth: 20 July 2003 (age 23)
- Place of birth: Dushanbe, Tajikistan
- Height: 1.72 m (5 ft 8 in)
- Position: Left midfielder

Team information
- Current team: Ryazan
- Number: 7

Youth career
- –2016: Arsenal Tula
- 2016–2018: UOR #5 Yegoryevsk
- 2018–2022: Arsenal Tula

Senior career*
Years	Team	Apps	(Gls)
2021–2026	Arsenal-2 Tula	32	(12)
2021–2026	Arsenal Tula	53	(3)
2026	Tyumen	12	(0)
2026–	Ryazan	12	(1)
- * Club domestic league appearances and goals as of 31 October 2026

Ansor Mukhamaddovudovich Khabibov (Russian: Ансор Мухамаддовудович Хабибов; born 20 July 2003) is a Russian football player of Tajik origin who plays as a left midfielder for Ryazan. He has also been deployed in many other midfield positions.

== Club career ==
Khabibov made his debut in the Russian Premier League for Arsenal Tula on 6 March 2022 in a game against Krylia Sovetov Samara.

== Career statistics ==
As of 28 May 2022

Club	Season	League			Cup		Continental		Total	
Club	Season	Division	Apps	Goals	Apps	Goals	Apps	Goals	Apps	Goals
Arsenal-2 Tula	2021–22	FNL 2	4	1	–		–		4	1
Arsenal Tula	2021–22	RPL	8	0	0	0	–		8	0
Career total			12	1	0	0	0	0	12	1
