= David Sangaré =

Russian footballer (born 2000)

Personal information
- Date of birth: 19 August 2000 (age 26)
- Place of birth: Bamako, Mali
- Height: 1.88 m (6 ft 2 in)
- Position: Goalkeeper

Team information
- Current team: Ryazan
- Number: 45

Youth career
- –2014: Rotor Volgograd
- 2014–2020: Dynamo Moscow

Senior career*
| Years | Team | Apps | (Gls) |
| 2019–2022 | Dynamo Moscow | 0 | (0) |
| 2020–2022 | Dynamo-2 Moscow | 24 | (0) |
| 2022–2024 | Rodina Moscow | 15 | (0) |
| 2022–2024 | Rodina-2 Moscow | 19 | (0) |
| 2023–2024 | → Akron Tolyatti (loan) | 0 | (0) |
| 2023–2024 | → Akron-2 Tolyatti (loan) | 1 | (0) |
| 2025–2026 | Arsenal Tula | 1 | (0) |
| 2025–2026 | Arsenal-2 Tula | 4 | (0) |
| 2026– | Ryazan | 7 | (0) |

International career^{‡}
| 2015–2016 | Russia U16 | 3 | (0) |
| 2016–2017 | Russia U17 | 7 | (0) |
| 2019 | Russia U20 | 2 | (0) |
- * Club domestic league appearances and goals as of 31 October 2026 ‡ National team caps and goals as of 3 August 2019

David Sangaré (Russian: Дэвид Сангаре; born 19 August 2000) is a footballer who plays as a goalkeeper for Ryazan. Born in Mali, he is a Russia youth international.

== Early life ==
He was born in 2000 in Mali. He moved to Russia at the age of three.

== Club career ==
In 2022, he signed for Russian side Rodina. He was described as "one of the key figures in the decisive period of the [2022/23] season" while playing for the club.

== International career ==
He is a Russia youth international. He is eligible to represent Mali internationally.

== Style of play ==
He operates as a goalkeeper. He is known for his diving ability.

== Personal life ==
He was born to a Russian mother and Malian father. He is a native of Bamako, Mali.
