= 2017–18 UEFA Champions League =

European football tournament

- The NSC Olimpiyskiy in Kyiv hosted the final

Tournament details
- Dates: Qualifying: 27 June – 23 August 2017; Competition proper: 12 September 2017 – 26 May 2018
- Teams: Competition proper: 32; Total: 79 (from 54 associations)

Final positions
- Champions: (Spain) Real Madrid (13th title)
- Runners-up: (England) Liverpool

Tournament statistics
- Matches played: 125
- Goals scored: 401 (3.21 per match)
- Attendance: 5,821,673 (46,573 per match)
- Top scorer(s): Cristiano Ronaldo (Real Madrid); 15 goals
- Best players: Goalkeeper: Keylor Navas (Real Madrid); Defender: Sergio Ramos (Real Madrid); Midfielder: Luka Modrić (Real Madrid); Forward: Cristiano Ronaldo (Real Madrid)

The 2017–18 UEFA Champions League was the 63rd season of Europe's premier club football tournament organised by UEFA, and the 26th season since it was renamed from the European Champion Clubs' Cup to the UEFA Champions League.

The final was played between Real Madrid and Liverpool at the NSC Olimpiyskiy in Kyiv, Ukraine. Real Madrid beat Liverpool 3-1 to win a record-extending 13th title, their third title in a row and fourth in five seasons. It was also the fifth and final consecutive year that a Spanish club won the competition.

As winners, Real Madrid qualified as the UEFA representative for the 2018 FIFA Club World Cup in the United Arab Emirates, and also earned the right to play against the winners of the 2017–18 UEFA Europa League, Atlético Madrid, in the 2018 UEFA Super Cup, winning the former. Additionally, they would have been automatically qualified for the 2018–19 UEFA Champions League group stage, but since they had already qualified through their league performance, the berth reserved was given to the champions of the 2017–18 Czech First League, the 11th-ranked association according to the 2018–19 access list.

== Association team allocation ==
79 teams from 54 of the 55 UEFA member associations participated (the exception being Liechtenstein, which did not organise a domestic league). The association ranking based on the UEFA country coefficients was used to determine the number of participating teams for each association:

- Associations 1–3 each had four teams qualify.
- Associations 4–6 each had three teams qualify.
- Associations 7–15 each had two teams qualify.
- Associations 16–55 (except Liechtenstein) each had one team qualify.
- The winners of the 2016–17 UEFA Champions League and 2016–17 UEFA Europa League were each given an additional entry if they did not qualify for the 2017–18 UEFA Champions League through their domestic league. Because a maximum of five teams from one association could enter the Champions League, if both the Champions League title holders and the Europa League title holders were from the same top three ranked association and finished outside the top four of their domestic league, the fourth-placed team of their association was moved to the Europa League. For this season:
  - The winners of the 2016–17 UEFA Champions League, Real Madrid, qualified through their domestic league, meaning the additional entry for the Champions League title holders was not necessary.
  - The winners of the 2016–17 UEFA Europa League, Manchester United, did not qualify through their domestic league, meaning the additional entry for the Europa League title holders was necessary.

Kosovo, who became a UEFA member on 3 May 2016, made their debut in the UEFA Champions League.

=== Association ranking ===
For the 2017–18 UEFA Champions League, the associations were allocated places according to their 2016 UEFA country coefficients, which took into account their performance in European competitions from 2011–12 to 2015–16.

Apart from the allocation based on the country coefficients, associations could have additional teams participating in the Champions League, as noted below:

- (UEL) – Additional berth for UEFA Europa League title holders

Rank	Association	Coeff.	Teams	Notes
1	Spain	105.713	4	
2	Germany	80.177	4	
3	England	76.284	4	+1 (UEL)
4	Italy	70.439	3	
5	Portugal	53.082	3	
6	France	52.749	3	
7	Russia	51.082	2	
8	Ukraine	44.883	2	
9	Belgium	40.000	2	
10	Netherlands	35.563	2	
11	Turkey	34.600	2	
12	Switzerland	33.775	2	
13	Czech Republic	32.925	2	
14	Greece	29.700	2	
15	Romania	25.383	2	
16	Austria	25.100	1	
17	Croatia	23.875	1	
18	Poland	22.500	1	
19	Cyprus	22.175	1	

Rank	Association	Coeff.	Teams	Notes
20	Belarus	20.000	1	
21	Sweden	19.875	1	
22	Norway	19.250	1	
23	Israel	18.625	1	
24	Denmark	18.600	1	
25	Scotland	17.300	1	
26	Azerbaijan	14.875	1	
27	Serbia	14.625	1	
28	Kazakhstan	14.125	1	
29	Bulgaria	13.125	1	
30	Slovenia	13.125	1	
31	Slovakia	12.000	1	
32	Liechtenstein	10.500	0	
33	Hungary	9.875	1	
34	Moldova	9.125	1	
35	Iceland	8.750	1	
36	Georgia	8.125	1	
37	Finland	7.400	1	

Rank	Association	Coeff.	Teams	Notes
38	Bosnia and Herzegovina	7.125	1	
39	Albania	6.625	1	
40	Macedonia	6.000	1	
41	Republic of Ireland	5.450	1	
42	Latvia	5.375	1	
43	Luxembourg	5.250	1	
44	Montenegro	4.875	1	
45	Lithuania	4.625	1	
46	Northern Ireland	4.500	1	
47	Estonia	4.250	1	
48	Armenia	4.125	1	
49	Faroe Islands	3.625	1	
50	Malta	3.583	1	
51	Wales	3.500	1	
52	Gibraltar	1.000	1	
53	Andorra	0.999	1	
54	San Marino	0.333	1	
55	Kosovo	0.000	1	

=== Distribution ===
In the default access list, the Champions League title holders entered the group stage. However, since Real Madrid already qualified for the group stage (as the champions of the 2016–17 La Liga), the Champions League title holders berth in the group stage was given to the Europa League title holders, Manchester United. and the following changes to the default allocation system are made:

- The third-placed teams of associations 4 (Italy) and 5 (Portugal) are promoted from the third qualifying round to the play-off round.

		Teams entering in this round	Teams advancing from previous round
First qualifying round (10 teams)		10 champions from associations 46–55	
Second qualifying round (34 teams)		29 champions from associations 16–45 (except Liechtenstein)	5 winners from the first qualifying round
Third qualifying round	Champions Route (20 teams)	3 champions from associations 13–15	17 winners from the second qualifying round
Third qualifying round	League Route (10 teams)	9 runners-up from associations 7–15; 1 third-placed team from association 6	
Play-off round	Champions Route (10 teams)		10 winners from the third qualifying round (Champions Route)
Play-off round	League Route (10 teams)	2 third-placed teams from associations 4–5; 3 fourth-placed teams from associations 1–3	5 winners from the third qualifying round (League Route)
Group stage (32 teams)		Europa League title holders; 12 champions from associations 1–12; 6 runners-up from associations 1–6; 3 third-placed teams from associations 1–3	5 winners from the play-off round (Champions Route); 5 winners from the play-off round (League Route)
Knockout phase (16 teams)			8 group winners from the group stage; 8 group runners-up from the group stage

=== Teams ===
League positions of the previous season qualified via league position shown in parentheses. Manchester United qualified as Europa League title holders. (TH: Champions League title holders; EL: Europa League title holders).

Group stage
(Spain) Real Madrid (1st)^{TH}	(England) Chelsea (1st)	(Portugal) Benfica (1st)	(Belgium) Anderlecht (1st)
(Spain) Barcelona (2nd)	(England) Tottenham Hotspur (2nd)	(Portugal) Porto (2nd)	(Netherlands) Feyenoord (1st)
(Spain) Atlético Madrid (3rd)	(England) Manchester City (3rd)	(France) Monaco (1st)	(Turkey) Beşiktaş (1st)
(Germany) Bayern Munich (1st)	(England) Manchester United (EL)	(France) Paris Saint-Germain (2nd)	(Switzerland) Basel (1st)
(Germany) RB Leipzig (2nd)	(Italy) Juventus (1st)	(Russia) Spartak Moscow (1st)	
(Germany) Borussia Dortmund (3rd)	(Italy) Roma (2nd)	(Ukraine) Shakhtar Donetsk (1st)	
Play-off round
Champions Route	League Route		
	(Spain) Sevilla (4th)	(England) Liverpool (4th)	(Portugal) Sporting CP (3rd)
	(Germany) TSG Hoffenheim (4th)	(Italy) Napoli (3rd)	
Third qualifying round
Champions Route	League Route		
(Czech Republic) Slavia Prague (1st)	(France) Nice (3rd)	(Netherlands) Ajax (2nd)	(Greece) AEK Athens (2nd)
(Greece) Olympiacos (1st)	(Russia) CSKA Moscow (2nd)	(Turkey) İstanbul Başakşehir (2nd)	(Romania) FCSB (2nd)
(Romania) Viitorul Constanța (1st)	(Ukraine) Dynamo Kyiv (2nd)	(Switzerland) Young Boys (2nd)	
	(Belgium) Club Brugge (2nd)	(Czech Republic) Viktoria Plzeň (2nd)	
Second qualifying round
(Austria) Red Bull Salzburg (1st)	(Denmark) Copenhagen (1st)	(Hungary) Honvéd (1st)	(Republic of Ireland) Dundalk (1st)
(Croatia) Rijeka (1st)	(Scotland) Celtic (1st)	(Moldova) Sheriff Tiraspol (1st)	(Latvia) Spartaks Jūrmala (1st)
(Poland) Legia Warsaw (1st)	(Azerbaijan) Qarabağ (1st)	(Iceland) FH (1st)	(Luxembourg) F91 Dudelange (1st)
(Cyprus) APOEL (1st)	(Serbia) Partizan (1st)	(Georgia (country)) Samtredia (1st)	(Montenegro) Budućnost Podgorica (1st)
(Belarus) BATE Borisov (1st)	(Kazakhstan) Astana (1st)	(Finland) Mariehamn (1st)	(Lithuania) Žalgiris (1st)
(Sweden) Malmö FF (1st)	(Bulgaria) Ludogorets Razgrad (1st)	(Bosnia and Herzegovina) Zrinjski Mostar (1st)	
(Norway) Rosenborg (1st)	(Slovenia) Maribor (1st)	(Albania) Kukësi (1st)	
(Israel) Hapoel Be'er Sheva (1st)	(Slovakia) Žilina (1st)	(North Macedonia) Vardar (1st)	
First qualifying round
(Northern Ireland) Linfield (1st)	(Faroe Islands) Víkingur Gøta (1st)	(Gibraltar) Europa (1st)	(Kosovo) Trepça '89 (1st)
(Estonia) FCI Tallinn (1st)	(Malta) Hibernians (1st)	(Andorra) FC Santa Coloma (1st)	
(Armenia) Alashkert (1st)	(Wales) The New Saints (1st)	(San Marino) La Fiorita (1st)	

== Round and draw dates ==
The schedule of the competition was as follows (all draws were held at the UEFA headquarters in Nyon, Switzerland, unless stated otherwise).

Phase	Round	Draw date	First leg	Second leg
Qualifying	First qualifying round	19 June 2017	27–28 June 2017	4–5 July 2017
Qualifying	Second qualifying round	19 June 2017	11–12 July 2017	18–19 July 2017
Qualifying	Third qualifying round	14 July 2017	25–26 July 2017	1–2 August 2017
Play-off	Play-off round	4 August 2017	15–16 August 2017	22–23 August 2017
Group stage	Matchday 1	24 August 2017 (Monaco)	12–13 September 2017	
Group stage	Matchday 2	24 August 2017 (Monaco)	26–27 September 2017	
Group stage	Matchday 3	24 August 2017 (Monaco)	17–18 October 2017	
Group stage	Matchday 4	24 August 2017 (Monaco)	31 October – 1 November 2017	
Group stage	Matchday 5	24 August 2017 (Monaco)	21–22 November 2017	
Group stage	Matchday 6	24 August 2017 (Monaco)	5–6 December 2017	
Knockout phase	Round of 16	11 December 2017	13–14 & 20–21 February 2018	6–7 & 13–14 March 2018
Knockout phase	Quarter-finals	16 March 2018	3–4 April 2018	10–11 April 2018
Knockout phase	Semi-finals	13 April 2018	24–25 April 2018	1–2 May 2018
Knockout phase	Final	13 April 2018	26 May 2018 at NSC Olimpiyskiy, Kyiv	

== Qualifying rounds ==
In the qualifying rounds and the play-off round, teams were divided into seeded and unseeded teams based on their 2017 UEFA club coefficients, and then drawn into two-legged home-and-away ties. Teams from the same association could not be drawn against each other.

=== First qualifying round ===
The draw for the first qualifying round was held on 19 June 2017, 12:00 CEST. The first legs were played on 27 and 28 June, and the second legs were played on 4 July 2017.

Team 1	Agg.	Team 2	1st leg	2nd leg
Víkingur Gøta (Faroe Islands)	6–2	(Kosovo) Trepça '89	2–1	4–1
Hibernians (Malta)	3–0	(Estonia) FCI Tallinn	2–0	1–0
Alashkert (Armenia)	2–1	(Andorra) FC Santa Coloma	1–0	1–1
The New Saints (Wales)	4–3	(Gibraltar) Europa	1–2	3–1 (a.e.t.)
Linfield (Northern Ireland)	1–0	(San Marino) La Fiorita	1–0	0–0

=== Second qualifying round ===
The draw for the second qualifying round was held on 19 June 2017, 12:00 CEST (after the completion of the first qualifying round draw). The first legs were played on 11, 12 and 14 July, and the second legs were played on 18 and 19 July 2017.

Team 1	Agg.	Team 2	1st leg	2nd leg
APOEL (Cyprus)	2–0	(Luxembourg) F91 Dudelange	1–0	1–0
Žalgiris (Lithuania)	3–5	(Bulgaria) Ludogorets Razgrad	2–1	1–4
Qarabağ (Azerbaijan)	6–0	(Georgia (country)) Samtredia	5–0	1–0
Partizan (Serbia)	2–0	(Montenegro) Budućnost Podgorica	2–0	0–0
Hibernians (Malta)	0–6	(Austria) Red Bull Salzburg	0–3	0–3
Sheriff Tiraspol (Moldova)	2–2 (a)	(Albania) Kukësi	1–0	1–2
Spartaks Jūrmala (Latvia)	1–2 (Note: Order of legs reversed after original draw.)	(Kazakhstan) Astana	0–1	1–1
BATE Borisov (Belarus)	4–2	(Armenia) Alashkert	1–1	3–1
Žilina (Slovakia)	3–4	(Denmark) Copenhagen	1–3	2–1
Hapoel Be'er Sheva (Israel)	5–3	(Hungary) Honvéd	2–1	3–2
Rijeka (Croatia)	7–1	(Wales) The New Saints	2–0	5–1
Malmö FF (Sweden)	2–4	(North Macedonia) Vardar	1–1	1–3
Zrinjski Mostar (Bosnia and Herzegovina)	2–3	(Slovenia) Maribor	1–2	1–1
Dundalk (Republic of Ireland)	2–3	(Norway) Rosenborg	1–1	1–2 (a.e.t.)
FH (Iceland)	3–1	(Faroe Islands) Víkingur Gøta	1–1	2–0
Linfield (Northern Ireland)	0–6	(Scotland) Celtic	0–2	0–4
Mariehamn (Finland)	0–9	(Poland) Legia Warsaw	0–3	0–6

=== Third qualifying round ===
The draw for the third qualifying round was held on 14 July 2017, 12:00 CEST. The third qualifying round was split into two separate sections: Champions Route (for league champions) and League Route (for league non-champions). The losing teams in both sections entered the 2017–18 UEFA Europa League play-off round.

The first legs were played on 25 and 26 July, and the second legs were played on 1 and 2 August 2017.

Team 1	Agg.	Team 2	1st leg	2nd leg
Champions Route
Slavia Prague (Czech Republic)	2–2 (a)	(Belarus) BATE Borisov	1–0	1–2
Astana (Kazakhstan)	3–2	(Poland) Legia Warsaw	3–1	0–1
Maribor (Slovenia)	2–0	(Iceland) FH	1–0	1–0
Vardar (North Macedonia)	2–4 (Note: Order of legs reversed after original draw.)	(Denmark) Copenhagen	1–0	1–4
Celtic (Scotland)	1–0	(Norway) Rosenborg	0–0	1–0
Hapoel Be'er Sheva (Israel)	3–3 (a)	(Bulgaria) Ludogorets Razgrad	2–0	1–3
Viitorul Constanța (Romania)	1–4	(Cyprus) APOEL	1–0	0–4 (a.e.t.)
Red Bull Salzburg (Austria)	1–1 (a)	(Croatia) Rijeka	1–1	0–0
Qarabağ (Azerbaijan)	2–1	(Moldova) Sheriff Tiraspol	0–0	2–1
Partizan (Serbia)	3–5	(Greece) Olympiacos	1–3	2–2
League Route
FCSB (Romania)	6–3	(Czech Republic) Viktoria Plzeň	2–2	4–1
Nice (France)	3–3 (a)	(Netherlands) Ajax	1–1	2–2
Dynamo Kyiv (Ukraine)	3–3 (a)	(Switzerland) Young Boys	3–1	0–2
AEK Athens (Greece)	0–3	(Russia) CSKA Moscow	0–2	0–1
Club Brugge (Belgium)	3–5	(Turkey) İstanbul Başakşehir	3–3	0–2

== Play-off round ==
The draw for the play-off round was held on 4 August 2017, 12:00 CEST. The play-off round was split into two separate sections: Champions Route (for league champions) and League Route (for league non-champions). The losing teams in both sections entered the 2017–18 UEFA Europa League group stage.

The first legs were played on 15 and 16 August, and the second legs were played on 22 and 23 August 2017.

Team 1	Agg.	Team 2	1st leg	2nd leg
Champions Route
Qarabağ (Azerbaijan)	2–2 (a)	(Denmark) Copenhagen	1–0	1–2
APOEL (Cyprus)	2–0	(Czech Republic) Slavia Prague	2–0	0–0
Olympiacos (Greece)	3–1	(Croatia) Rijeka	2–1	1–0
Celtic (Scotland)	8–4	(Kazakhstan) Astana	5–0	3–4
Hapoel Be'er Sheva (Israel)	2–2 (a)	(Slovenia) Maribor	2–1	0–1
League Route
İstanbul Başakşehir (Turkey)	3–4	(Spain) Sevilla	1–2	2–2
Young Boys (Switzerland)	0–3	(Russia) CSKA Moscow	0–1	0–2
Napoli (Italy)	4–0	(France) Nice	2–0	2–0
TSG Hoffenheim (Germany)	3–6	(England) Liverpool	1–2	2–4
Sporting CP (Portugal)	5–1	(Romania) FCSB	0–0	5–1

== Group stage ==
Location of teams of the 2017–18 UEFA Champions League group stage.
Brown: Group A; Red: Group B; Orange: Group C; Yellow: Group D;
Green: Group E; Blue: Group F; Purple: Group G; Pink: Group H.

The draw for the group stage was held on 24 August 2017, 18:00 CEST, at the Grimaldi Forum in Monaco. The 32 teams were drawn into eight groups of four, with the restriction that teams from the same association could not be drawn against each other. For the draw, the teams were seeded into four pots based on the following principles (introduced starting 2015–16 season):

- Pot 1 contained the title holders and the champions of the top seven associations based on their 2016 UEFA country coefficients. As the title holders, Real Madrid, were one of the champions of the top seven associations, the champions of the association ranked eighth (Ukraine's Shakhtar Donetsk) were also seeded into Pot 1 (regulations Article 13.05).
- Pot 2, 3 and 4 contained the remaining teams, seeded based on their 2017 UEFA club coefficients.

In each group, teams played against each other home-and-away in a round-robin format. The group winners and runners-up advanced to the round of 16, while the third-placed teams entered the 2017–18 UEFA Europa League round of 32. The matchdays were 12–13 September, 26–27 September, 17–18 October, 31 October – 1 November, 21–22 November, and 5–6 December 2017.

The youth teams of the clubs that qualified for the group stage also participated in the 2017–18 UEFA Youth League on the same matchdays, where they competed in the UEFA Champions League Path (the youth domestic champions of the top 32 associations competed in a separate Domestic Champions Path until the play-offs).

Seventeen national associations were represented in the group stage. Qarabağ and RB Leipzig made their debut appearances in the group stage. Qarabağ were the first team from Azerbaijan to play in the Champions League group stage. For the first time since the 1997–98 edition, England's Arsenal did not qualify for the group stage.

Tiebreakers

Teams were ranked according to points (3 points for a win, 1 point for a draw, 0 points for a loss), and if tied on points, the following tiebreaking criteria were applied, in the order given, to determine the rankings (Regulations Articles 17.01):

1. Points in head-to-head matches among tied teams;
2. Goal difference in head-to-head matches among tied teams;
3. Away goals scored in head-to-head matches among tied teams;
4. If more than two teams are tied, and after applying all head-to-head criteria above, a subset of teams are still tied, all head-to-head criteria above are reapplied exclusively to this subset of teams;
5. Goal difference in all group matches;
6. Goals scored in all group matches;
7. Away goals scored in all group matches;
8. Wins in all group matches;
9. Away wins in all group matches;
10. Disciplinary points (red card = 3 points, yellow card = 1 point, expulsion for two yellow cards in one match = 3 points);
11. UEFA club coefficient.

=== Group A ===
Pos	Team	Pld	W	D	L	GF	GA	GD	Pts	Qualification	MUN	BSL	CSKA	BEN
1	(England) Manchester United	6	5	0	1	12	3	+9	15	Advance to knockout phase	—	3–0	2–1	2–0
2	(Switzerland) Basel	6	4	0	2	11	5	+6	12	Advance to knockout phase	1–0	—	1–2	5–0
3	(Russia) CSKA Moscow	6	3	0	3	8	10	−2	9	Transfer to Europa League	1–4	0–2	—	2–0
4	(Portugal) Benfica	6	0	0	6	1	14	−13	0		0–1	0–2	1–2	—

Source: UEFA

=== Group B ===
Pos	Team	Pld	W	D	L	GF	GA	GD	Pts	Qualification	PAR	BAY	CEL	AND
1	(France) Paris Saint-Germain	6	5	0	1	25	4	+21	15 (Note: Head-to-head results: Paris Saint-Germain 3–0 Bayern Munich, Bayern Munich 3–1 Paris Saint-Germain.)	Advance to knockout phase	—	3–0	7–1	5–0
2	(Germany) Bayern Munich	6	5	0	1	13	6	+7	15	Advance to knockout phase	3–1	—	3–0	3–0
3	(Scotland) Celtic	6	1	0	5	5	18	−13	3 (Note: Head-to-head results: Anderlecht 0–3 Celtic, Celtic 0–1 Anderlecht.)	Transfer to Europa League	0–5	1–2	—	0–1
4	(Belgium) Anderlecht	6	1	0	5	2	17	−15	3		0–4	1–2	0–3	—

Source: UEFA

=== Group C ===
Pos	Team	Pld	W	D	L	GF	GA	GD	Pts	Qualification	ROM	CHE	ATM	QRB
1	(Italy) Roma	6	3	2	1	9	6	+3	11 (Note: Head-to-head results: Chelsea 3–3 Roma, Roma 3–0 Chelsea.)	Advance to knockout phase	—	3–0	0–0	1–0
2	(England) Chelsea	6	3	2	1	16	8	+8	11	Advance to knockout phase	3–3	—	1–1	6–0
3	(Spain) Atlético Madrid	6	1	4	1	5	4	+1	7	Transfer to Europa League	2–0	1–2	—	1–1
4	(Azerbaijan) Qarabağ	6	0	2	4	2	14	−12	2		1–2	0–4	0–0	—

Source: UEFA

=== Group D ===
Pos	Team	Pld	W	D	L	GF	GA	GD	Pts	Qualification	BAR	JUV	SPO	OLY
1	(Spain) Barcelona	6	4	2	0	9	1	+8	14	Advance to knockout phase	—	3–0	2–0	3–1
2	(Italy) Juventus	6	3	2	1	7	5	+2	11	Advance to knockout phase	0–0	—	2–1	2–0
3	(Portugal) Sporting CP	6	2	1	3	8	9	−1	7	Transfer to Europa League	0–1	1–1	—	3–1
4	(Greece) Olympiacos	6	0	1	5	4	13	−9	1		0–0	0–2	2–3	—

Source: UEFA

=== Group E ===
Pos	Team	Pld	W	D	L	GF	GA	GD	Pts	Qualification	LIV	SEV	SPM	MRB
1	(England) Liverpool	6	3	3	0	23	6	+17	12	Advance to knockout phase	—	2–2	7–0	3–0
2	(Spain) Sevilla	6	2	3	1	12	12	0	9	Advance to knockout phase	3–3	—	2–1	3–0
3	(Russia) Spartak Moscow	6	1	3	2	9	13	−4	6	Transfer to Europa League	1–1	5–1	—	1–1
4	(Slovenia) Maribor	6	0	3	3	3	16	−13	3		0–7	1–1	1–1	—

Source: UEFA

=== Group F ===
Pos	Team	Pld	W	D	L	GF	GA	GD	Pts	Qualification	MCI	SHK	NAP	FEY
1	(England) Manchester City	6	5	0	1	14	5	+9	15	Advance to knockout phase	—	2–0	2–1	1–0
2	(Ukraine) Shakhtar Donetsk	6	4	0	2	9	9	0	12	Advance to knockout phase	2–1	—	2–1	3–1
3	(Italy) Napoli	6	2	0	4	11	11	0	6	Transfer to Europa League	2–4	3–0	—	3–1
4	(Netherlands) Feyenoord	6	1	0	5	5	14	−9	3		0–4	1–2	2–1	—

Source: UEFA

=== Group G ===
Pos	Team	Pld	W	D	L	GF	GA	GD	Pts	Qualification	BES	POR	RBL	MON
1	(Turkey) Beşiktaş	6	4	2	0	11	5	+6	14	Advance to knockout phase	—	1–1	2–0	1–1
2	(Portugal) Porto	6	3	1	2	15	10	+5	10	Advance to knockout phase	1–3	—	3–1	5–2
3	(Germany) RB Leipzig	6	2	1	3	10	11	−1	7	Transfer to Europa League	1–2	3–2	—	1–1
4	(France) Monaco	6	0	2	4	6	16	−10	2		1–2	0–3	1–4	—

Source: UEFA

=== Group H ===
Pos	Team	Pld	W	D	L	GF	GA	GD	Pts	Qualification	TOT	RMA	DOR	APO
1	(England) Tottenham Hotspur	6	5	1	0	15	4	+11	16	Advance to knockout phase	—	3–1	3–1	3–0
2	(Spain) Real Madrid	6	4	1	1	17	7	+10	13	Advance to knockout phase	1–1	—	3–2	3–0
3	(Germany) Borussia Dortmund	6	0	2	4	7	13	−6	2 (Note: Head-to-head results: APOEL 1–1 Borussia Dortmund, Borussia Dortmund 1–1 APOEL (tied on head-to-head results, ranked on total goal difference).)	Transfer to Europa League	1–2	1–3	—	1–1
4	(Cyprus) APOEL	6	0	2	4	2	17	−15	2		0–3	0–6	1–1	—

Source: UEFA

== Knockout phase ==
In the knockout phase, teams played against each other over two legs on a home-and-away basis, except for the one-match final. The mechanism of the draws for each round was as follows:

- In the draw for the round of 16, the eight group winners were seeded, and the eight group runners-up were unseeded. The seeded teams were drawn against the unseeded teams, with the seeded teams hosting the second leg. Teams from the same group or the same association could not be drawn against each other.
- In the draws for the quarter-finals onwards, there were no seedings, and teams from the same group or the same association could be drawn against each other.

=== Bracket ===
Round of 16
(Spain) Sevilla	0	2	2
(England) Manchester United	0	1	1
(Germany) Bayern Munich	5	3	8
(Turkey) Beşiktaş	0	1	1
(Italy) Juventus	2	2	4
(England) Tottenham Hotspur	2	1	3
(Spain) Real Madrid	3	2	5
(France) Paris Saint-Germain	1	1	2
(Portugal) Porto	0	0	0
(England) Liverpool	5	0	5
(Switzerland) Basel	0	2	2
(England) Manchester City	4	1	5
(England) Chelsea	1	0	1
(Spain) Barcelona	1	3	4
(Ukraine) Shakhtar Donetsk	2	0	2
(Italy) Roma (a)	1	1	2

Quarter-finals
(Spain) Sevilla	1	0	1
(Germany) Bayern Munich	2	0	2
(Italy) Juventus	0	3	3
(Spain) Real Madrid	3	1	4
(England) Liverpool	3	2	5
(England) Manchester City	0	1	1
(Spain) Barcelona	4	0	4
(Italy) Roma (a)	1	3	4

Semi-finals
(Germany) Bayern Munich	1	2	3
(Spain) Real Madrid	2	2	4
(England) Liverpool	5	2	7
(Italy) Roma	2	4	6

Final
26 May – Kyiv
(Spain) Real Madrid	3
(England) Liverpool	1

=== Round of 16 ===
The draw for the round of 16 was held on 11 December 2017, 12:00 CET. The first legs were played on 13, 14, 20 and 21 February, and the second legs were played on 6, 7, 13 and 14 March 2018.

Team 1	Agg.	Team 2	1st leg	2nd leg
Juventus (Italy)	4–3	(England) Tottenham Hotspur	2–2	2–1
Basel (Switzerland)	2–5	(England) Manchester City	0–4	2–1
Porto (Portugal)	0–5	(England) Liverpool	0–5	0–0
Sevilla (Spain)	2–1	(England) Manchester United	0–0	2–1
Real Madrid (Spain)	5–2	(France) Paris Saint-Germain	3–1	2–1
Shakhtar Donetsk (Ukraine)	2–2 (a)	(Italy) Roma	2–1	0–1
Chelsea (England)	1–4	(Spain) Barcelona	1–1	0–3
Bayern Munich (Germany)	8–1	(Turkey) Beşiktaş	5–0	3–1

=== Quarter-finals ===
The draw for the quarter-finals was held on 16 March 2018, 12:00 CET. The first legs were played on 3 and 4 April, and the second legs were played on 10 and 11 April 2018.

Team 1	Agg.	Team 2	1st leg	2nd leg
Barcelona (Spain)	4–4 (a)	(Italy) Roma	4–1	0–3
Sevilla (Spain)	1–2	(Germany) Bayern Munich	1–2	0–0
Juventus (Italy)	3–4	(Spain) Real Madrid	0–3	3–1
Liverpool (England)	5–1	(England) Manchester City	3–0	2–1

=== Semi-finals ===
The draw for the semi-finals was held on 13 April 2018, 13:00 CEST. The first legs were played on 24 and 25 April, and the second legs were played on 1 and 2 May 2018.

Team 1	Agg.	Team 2	1st leg	2nd leg
Bayern Munich (Germany)	3–4	(Spain) Real Madrid	1–2	2–2
Liverpool (England)	7–6	(Italy) Roma	5–2	2–4

=== Final ===
The final was played at the NSC Olimpiyskiy in Kyiv on 26 May 2018. The "home" team (for administrative purposes) was determined by an additional draw held after the semi-final draw.

26 May 2018
21:45 UTC+3

Real Madrid (Spain)	3–1	(England) Liverpool
Benzema 51'; Bale 63', 83'	Report	Mané 55'

NSC Olimpiyskiy, Kyiv
Attendance: 61,561
Referee: Milorad Mažić (Serbia)

== Statistics ==
Statistics exclude qualifying rounds and play-off round.

=== Top goalscorers ===
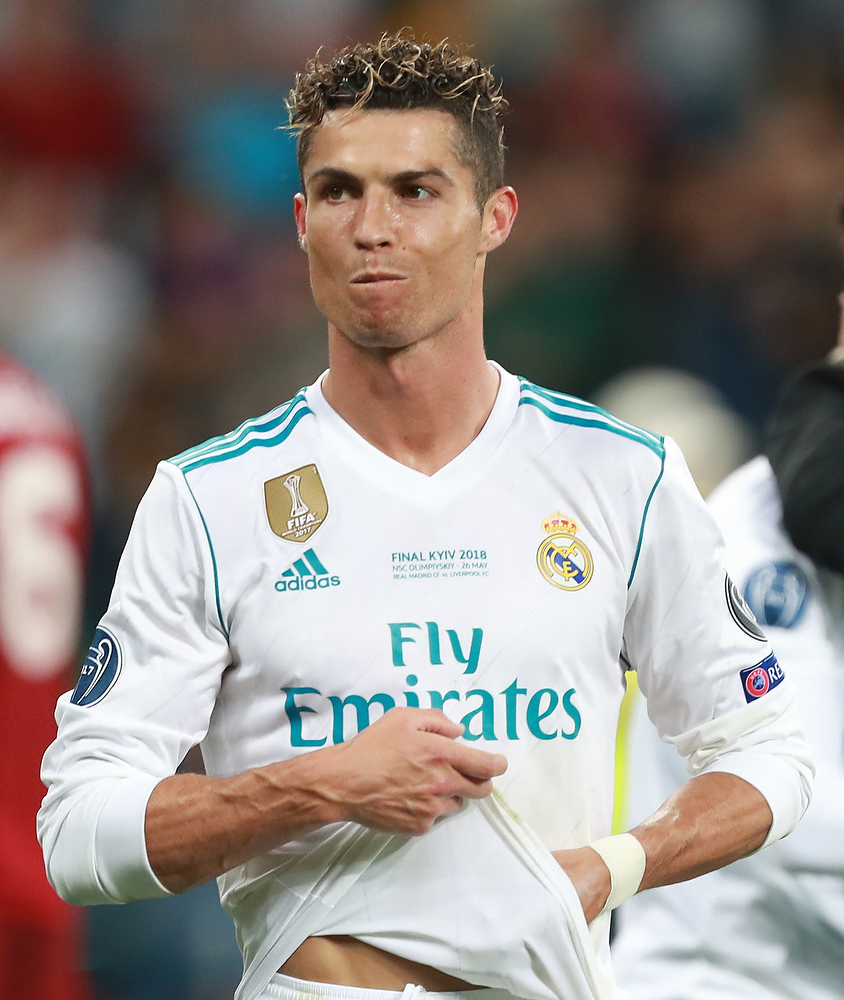
Real Madrid's Cristiano Ronaldo finished the tournament as the top goalscorer, having scored 15 goals.

Rank	Player	Team	Goals	Minutes played
1	(Portugal) Cristiano Ronaldo	(Spain) Real Madrid	15	1170
2	(Egypt) Mohamed Salah	(England) Liverpool	10	930
2	(Senegal) Sadio Mané	(England) Liverpool	10	940
2	(Brazil) Roberto Firmino	(England) Liverpool	10	1056
5	(France) Wissam Ben Yedder	(Spain) Sevilla	8	651
5	(Bosnia and Herzegovina) Edin Džeko	(Italy) Roma	8	1078
7	(England) Harry Kane	(England) Tottenham Hotspur	7	597
7	(Uruguay) Edinson Cavani	(France) Paris Saint-Germain	7	680
9	(Brazil) Neymar	(France) Paris Saint-Germain	6	630
9	(Argentina) Lionel Messi	(Spain) Barcelona	6	783

=== Squad of the season ===
The UEFA technical study group selected the following 18 players as the squad of the tournament.

Pos.	Player	Team
GK	(Costa Rica) Keylor Navas	(Spain) Real Madrid
GK	(Brazil) Alisson	(Italy) Roma
DF	(Germany) Joshua Kimmich	(Germany) Bayern Munich
DF	(Spain) Sergio Ramos	(Spain) Real Madrid
DF	(Brazil) Marcelo	(Spain) Real Madrid
DF	(Italy) Giorgio Chiellini	(Italy) Juventus
DF	(Netherlands) Virgil van Dijk	(England) Liverpool
DF	(France) Raphaël Varane	(Spain) Real Madrid
MF	(Belgium) Kevin De Bruyne	(England) Manchester City
MF	(Brazil) Casemiro	(Spain) Real Madrid
MF	(Croatia) Luka Modrić	(Spain) Real Madrid
MF	(Germany) Toni Kroos	(Spain) Real Madrid
MF	(Colombia) James Rodríguez	(Germany) Bayern Munich
FW	(Bosnia and Herzegovina) Edin Džeko	(Italy) Roma
FW	(Brazil) Roberto Firmino	(England) Liverpool
FW	(Argentina) Lionel Messi	(Spain) Barcelona
FW	(Portugal) Cristiano Ronaldo	(Spain) Real Madrid
FW	(Egypt) Mohamed Salah	(England) Liverpool

=== Players of the season ===
Votes were cast for players of the season by coaches of the 32 teams in the group stage, together with 55 journalists selected by the European Sports Media (ESM) group, representing each of UEFA's member associations. The coaches were not allowed to vote for players from their own teams. Jury members selected their top three players, with the first receiving five points, the second three and the third one. The shortlist of the top three players were announced on 9 August 2018. The award winners were announced and presented during the 2018–19 UEFA Champions League group stage draw in Monaco on 30 August 2018.

==== Goalkeeper of the season ====
Rank	Player	Team	Points
Shortlist of top three
1	(Costa Rica) Keylor Navas	(Spain) Real Madrid	222
2	(Brazil) Alisson	(Italy) Roma	197
3	(Italy) Gianluigi Buffon	(Italy) Juventus	92
Players ranked 4–10
4	(Germany) Marc-André ter Stegen	(Spain) Barcelona	47
5	(Belgium) Thibaut Courtois	(England) Chelsea	28
6	(Brazil) Ederson	(England) Manchester City	26
7	(France) Hugo Lloris	(England) Tottenham Hotspur	18
8	(Slovenia) Jan Oblak	(Spain) Atlético Madrid	16
9	(Spain) David de Gea	(England) Manchester United	7
10	(Germany) Sven Ulreich	(Germany) Bayern Munich	5

==== Defender of the season ====
Rank	Player	Team	Points
Shortlist of top three
1	(Spain) Sergio Ramos	(Spain) Real Madrid	184
2	(France) Raphaël Varane	(Spain) Real Madrid	167
3	(Brazil) Marcelo	(Spain) Real Madrid	145
Players ranked 4–10
4	(Italy) Giorgio Chiellini	(Italy) Juventus	40
5	(Croatia) Dejan Lovren	(England) Liverpool	37
6	(Netherlands) Virgil van Dijk	(England) Liverpool	24
7	(Uruguay) Diego Godín	(Spain) Atlético Madrid	15
8	(Germany) Joshua Kimmich	(Germany) Bayern Munich	14
9	(Germany) Mats Hummels	(Germany) Bayern Munich	13
10	(Spain) Gerard Piqué	(Spain) Barcelona	10

==== Midfielder of the season ====
Rank	Player	Team	Points
Shortlist of top three
1	(Croatia) Luka Modrić	(Spain) Real Madrid	347
2	(Belgium) Kevin De Bruyne	(England) Manchester City	114
3	(Germany) Toni Kroos	(Spain) Real Madrid	69
Players ranked 4–10
4	(Brazil) Casemiro	(Spain) Real Madrid	40
5	(England) James Milner	(England) Liverpool	18
6	(Spain) Andrés Iniesta	(Spain) Barcelona	16
7	(Croatia) Ivan Rakitić	(Spain) Barcelona	9
8	(Spain) Isco	(Spain) Real Madrid	6
8	(Senegal) Sadio Mané	(England) Liverpool	6
8	(Bosnia and Herzegovina) Miralem Pjanić	(Italy) Juventus	6
8	(Colombia) James Rodríguez	(Germany) Bayern Munich	6

==== Forward of the season ====
Rank	Player	Team	Points
Shortlist of top three
1	(Portugal) Cristiano Ronaldo	(Spain) Real Madrid	287
2	(Egypt) Mohamed Salah	(England) Liverpool	218
3	(Argentina) Lionel Messi	(Spain) Barcelona	43
Players ranked 4–10
4	(France) Kylian Mbappé	(France) Paris Saint-Germain	17
5	(Bosnia and Herzegovina) Edin Džeko	(Italy) Roma	15
5	(England) Harry Kane	(England) Tottenham Hotspur	15
7	(Brazil) Roberto Firmino	(England) Liverpool	13
8	(Wales) Gareth Bale	(Spain) Real Madrid	12
8	(France) Antoine Griezmann	(Spain) Atlético Madrid	12
8	(Senegal) Sadio Mané	(England) Liverpool	12

== See also ==
- 2017–18 UEFA Europa League
- 2018 UEFA Super Cup
- 2018 FIFA Club World Cup
- 2017–18 UEFA Women's Champions League
- 2017–18 UEFA Youth League
