= Dmitri Andreyev =

Russian footballer

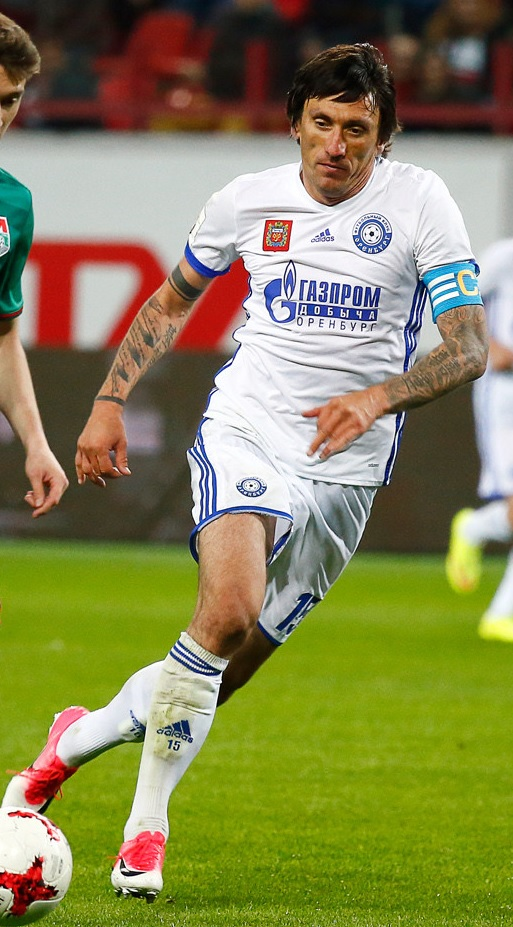
- Andreyev with Orenburg in 2017

Personal information
- Full name: Dmitri Stepanovich Andreyev
- Date of birth: 26 September 1980 (age 46)
- Place of birth: Elista, Russian SFSR
- Height: 1.88 m (6 ft 2 in)
- Position: Defender

Team information
- Current team: FC Orenburg (sporting director)

Senior career*
Years	Team	Apps	(Gls)
2000	FC Uralan Elista	8	(0)
2001	FC Zhemchuzhina Sochi	30	(3)
2002	FC Arsenal Tula	14	(0)
2003	FC Uralan Elista	0	(0)
2004–2007	FC Lada Togliatti	108	(8)
2007–2009	FC Volga Nizhny Novgorod	56	(9)
2010	FC Tyumen	24	(7)
2011–2019	FC Orenburg	204	(16)

Managerial career
- 2019–: FC Orenburg (sporting director)
- * Club domestic league appearances and goals

Dmitri Stepanovich Andreyev (Russian: Дмитрий Степанович Андреев; born 26 September 1980) is a Russian professional football official and a former player who played as centre-back. He is the sporting director for FC Orenburg.

== Club career ==
He made his debut in the Russian Premier League in 2000 for FC Uralan Elista.

== Honours ==
- Russian Second Division, Zone Ural-Povolzhye best defender: 2010.
