= Vadim Afonin =

Uzbek-Russian footballer

Vadim Sergeyevich Afonin
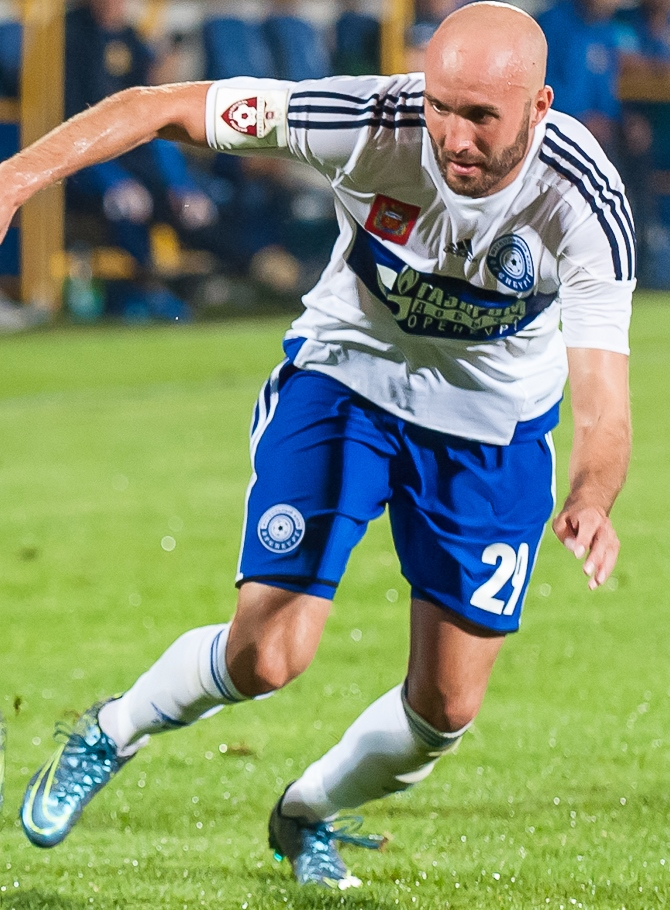
- Afonin with Orenburg in 2016

Personal information
- Full name: Vadim Sergeyevich Afonin
- Date of birth: 29 September 1987 (age 39)
- Place of birth: Tashkent, Uzbek SSR, Soviet Union
- Height: 1.76 m (5 ft 9 in)
- Position: Midfielder

Youth career
- Traktor Tashkent

Senior career*
Years	Team	Apps	(Gls)
2005	Traktor Tashkent	24	(0)
2006–2008	Rubin Kazan	0	(0)
2009–2012	Shurtan Guzar	69	(4)
2013	Salyut Belgorod	35	(2)
2014–2017	Orenburg	103	(5)
2017	Anzhi Makhachkala	13	(0)
2018–2019	Orenburg	49	(5)
2020	Lokomotiv Tashkent	15	(0)

International career
2004	Uzbekistan U-17	7	(2)
2007	Uzbekistan U-20	5	(0)
2009	Uzbekistan U-21	2	(0)
2012–2017	Uzbekistan	6	(0)
- * Club domestic league appearances and goals

Vadim Afonin (Russian: Вадим Афонин, born 29 September 1987) is an Uzbek-Russian former footballer who played as a defensive midfielder.

== Career ==
=== Club ===
In February 2014 Afonin signed for Gazovik Orenburg.

On 21 June 2017, FC Anzhi Makhachkala announced the signing of Afonin on a one-year contract with an option of a second year.

He returned to FC Orenburg on 11 January 2018. On 19 February 2020 he was removed by Orenburg from their squad registered with the league.

On 2 March 2020, he returned to Uzbekistan and signed with Lokomotiv Tashkent.
