= Dmitri Chvanov =

Russian football player

Personal information
- Full name: Dmitri Sergeyevich Chvanov
- Date of birth: 8 January 1994 (age 32)
- Place of birth: Krasnoyarsk, Russia
- Height: 1.87 m (6 ft 2 in)
- Position: Goalkeeper

Senior career*
Years	Team	Apps	(Gls)
2012–2016	FC Gazovik Orenburg	2	(0)
2017	FC Nosta Novotroitsk	6	(0)
2017–2018	FC Orenburg	0	(0)
2017	→ FC Orenburg-2	10	(0)
2018–2020	FC Khimik-August Vurnary		
2020–2023	FC Orenburg-2	38	(0)
- * Club domestic league appearances and goals

Dmitri Sergeyevich Chvanov (Russian: Дмитрий Сергеевич Чванов; born 8 January 1994) is a Russian former football player who played as a goalkeeper.

== Club career ==
He made his debut in the Russian Football National League for FC Gazovik Orenburg on 11 October 2014 in a game against FC SKA-Energiya Khabarovsk.
