= Anzor Sanaya =

Russian footballer

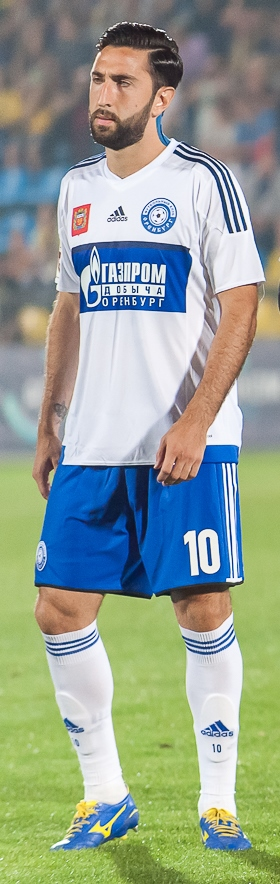
- Sanaya with FC Orenburg in 2016

Personal information
- Full name: Anzor Zurabovich Sanaya
- Date of birth: 22 May 1989 (age 37)
- Place of birth: Mineralnye Vody, Stavropol Krai, Russian SFSR
- Height: 1.88 m (6 ft 2 in)
- Position: Forward

Senior career*
Years	Team	Apps	(Gls)
2007	FC Baltika-2 Kaliningrad	16	(0)
2007	FC Sportakademklub Moscow	9	(1)
2008–2009	FC Baltika Kaliningrad	38	(3)
2009–2010	FC Lokomotiv-2 Moscow	28	(9)
2011–2012	FC Spartak Kostroma	51	(11)
2013–2014	FC Tekstilshchik Ivanovo	35	(20)
2014–2016	FC Tom Tomsk	56	(17)
2016–2017	FC Orenburg	18	(0)
2017–2018	FC Tom Tomsk	34	(4)
2018	PFC Sochi	22	(3)
2019–2020	FC Rotor Volgograd	31	(8)
2020–2023	FC Yenisey Krasnoyarsk	60	(13)

Managerial career
- 2023: Pari NN (assistant)
- 2023: FC Yenisey Krasnoyarsk (assistant)
- 2023: FC Yenisey Krasnoyarsk (sporting director)
- * Club domestic league appearances and goals

Anzor Zurabovich Sanaya (Russian: Анзор Зурабович Саная; born 22 May 1989) is a Russian professional football coach and a former player.

== Club career ==
He made his Russian Premier League debut for FC Orenburg on 30 July 2016 in a game against FC Rostov.

== Personal life ==
He is a son of Zurab Sanaya.
