= Aleksei Druzin =

Russian professional football player

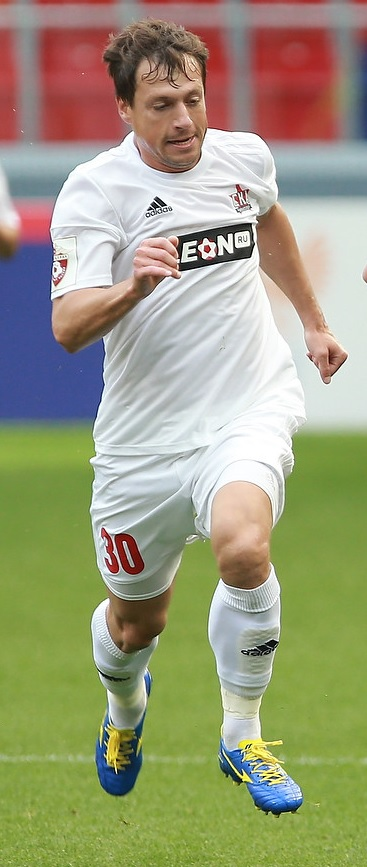
- Druzin with SKA-Khabarovsk in 2017

Personal information
- Full name: Aleksei Aleksandrovich Druzin
- Date of birth: 3 January 1987 (age 39)
- Place of birth: Volgograd, Russian SFSR
- Height: 1.76 m (5 ft 9 in)
- Position: Midfielder

Senior career*
Years	Team	Apps	(Gls)
2004	FC Rotor Volgograd	0	(0)
2005	FC Tekstilshchik Kamyshin	22	(1)
2006	FC Energetik Uren	23	(1)
2007–2008	FC Alnas Almetyevsk	57	(7)
2009–2010	FC Irtysh Omsk	58	(2)
2011–2012	FC KAMAZ Naberezhnye Chelny	42	(1)
2012–2016	FC Gazovik Orenburg	120	(10)
2016–2017	FC SKA-Khabarovsk	22	(0)
2018–2019	FC Rotor Volgograd	20	(1)
2019–2020	FC Novosibirsk	11	(2)
2020–2021	FC Volna Nizhny Novgorod Oblast	17	(1)
2021	FC Start Yeysk (amateur)		
- * Club domestic league appearances and goals

Aleksei Aleksandrovich Druzin (Russian: Алексей Александрович Друзин; born 3 January 1987) is a Russian former professional football player who played as a central midfielder.

== Club career ==
He made his Russian Premier League debut for FC SKA-Khabarovsk on 16 July 2017 in a game against FC Zenit Saint Petersburg.
