= Vladimir Parnyakov =

Russian footballer

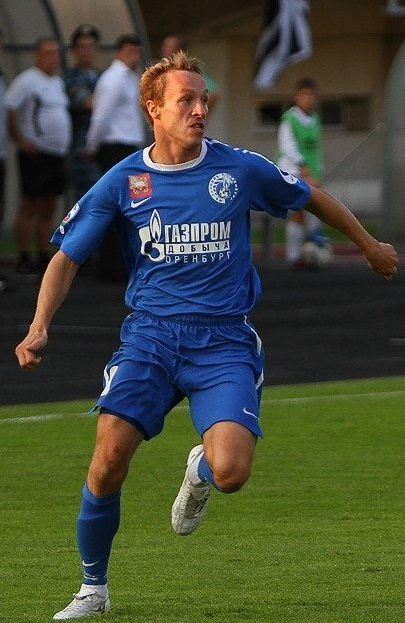
- Parnyakov with Gazovik Orenburg in 2011

Personal information
- Full name: Vladimir Aleksandrovich Parnyakov
- Date of birth: 30 January 1984 (age 42)
- Place of birth: Vologda, Russian SFSR
- Height: 1.73 m (5 ft 8 in)
- Position: Midfielder

Team information
- Current team: FC Dynamo Vologda (administrator)

Youth career
- –2001: SDYuSShOR №3 Vologda

Senior career*
Years	Team	Apps	(Gls)
2002–2006	FC Dynamo Vologda	150	(13)
2007–2008	FC Spartak Kostroma	62	(3)
2009	FC Dynamo Vologda	34	(7)
2010–2018	FC Orenburg	232	(24)
2018	FC Tyumen	22	(0)
2019	FC Cherepovets (amateur)		
2020	SDYuSShOR Vologda (amateur)		
2021–2022	FC Dynamo Vologda (amateur)		
2022–2025	FC Dynamo Vologda	47	(2)
Total		547	(49)

Managerial career
- 2024–2025: FC Dynamo Vologda (assistant)
- 2026–: FC Dynamo Vologda (administrator)
- * Club domestic league appearances and goals

Vladimir Aleksandrovich Parnyakov (Russian: Владимир Александрович Парняков; born 30 January 1984) is a Russian professional football coach and a former right midfielder. He works as an administrator for FC Dynamo Vologda.
