= Sergei Breyev =

Russian professional football player

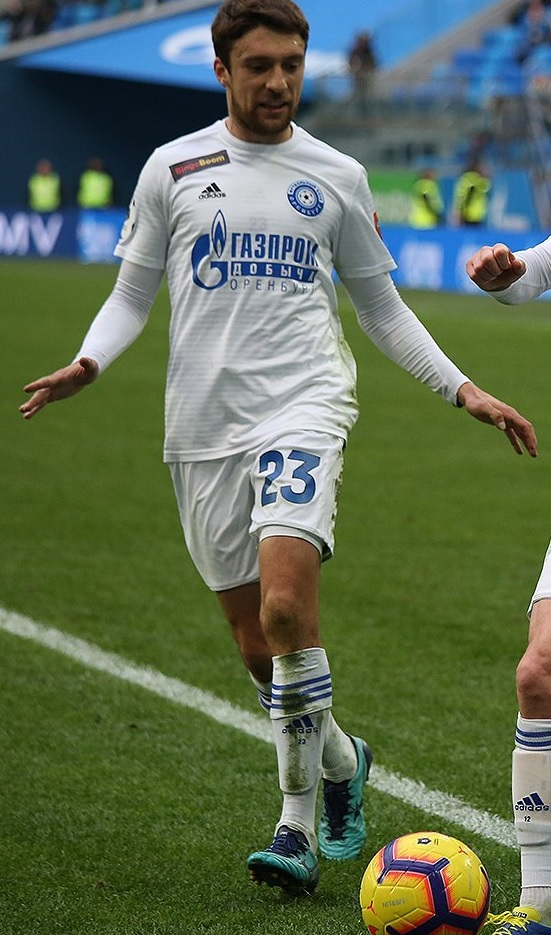
- Breyev with FC Orenburg in 2019

Personal information
- Full name: Sergei Gennadyevich Breyev
- Date of birth: 22 April 1987 (age 39)
- Place of birth: Brezhnev, Russian SFSR
- Height: 1.77 m (5 ft 10 in)
- Position: Midfielder

Senior career*
Years	Team	Apps	(Gls)
2004–2008	FC Rotor Volgograd	16	(0)
2007	→ FC Tekstilshchik Kamyshin (loan)	24	(2)
2008	FC Alnas Almetyevsk	8	(0)
2009	FC Irtysh Omsk	25	(1)
2010–2012	FC KAMAZ Naberezhnye Chelny	61	(4)
2012–2013	FC Khimki	26	(1)
2013–2019	FC Orenburg	137	(8)
2019–2020	FC Avangard Kursk	18	(0)
2020–2022	FC Orenburg	44	(4)
- * Club domestic league appearances and goals

Sergei Gennadyevich Breyev (Russian: Серге́й Геннадьевич Бреев; born 22 April 1987) is a Russian former professional football player. He played as a defensive midfielder.

== Club career ==
He made his Russian Premier League debut for FC Orenburg on 16 October 2016 in a game against FC Tom Tomsk.
