= Denis Fedenko =

Russian footballer

Personal information
- Full name: Denis Aleksandrovich Fedenko
- Date of birth: 9 February 1999 (age 27)
- Height: 1.77 m (5 ft 10 in)
- Position: Midfielder

Senior career*
Years	Team	Apps	(Gls)
2017–2019	FC Orenburg	0	(0)
2017–2018	→ FC Orenburg-2	21	(1)
2019–2020	FC Nosta Novotroitsk	9	(0)
2021–2024	FC Orenburg-2	102	(14)
- * Club domestic league appearances and goals as of 19 October 2024

Denis Aleksandrovich Fedenko (Russian: Денис Александрович Феденко; born 9 February 1999) is a Russian football player.

== Club career ==
He made his debut in the Russian Professional Football League for FC Orenburg-2 on 27 July 2017 in a game against FC Chelyabinsk.

He made his debut for the main squad of FC Orenburg on 25 September 2018 in a Russian Cup game against FC Dynamo Barnaul.
