= Andrei Malykh =

Russian footballer

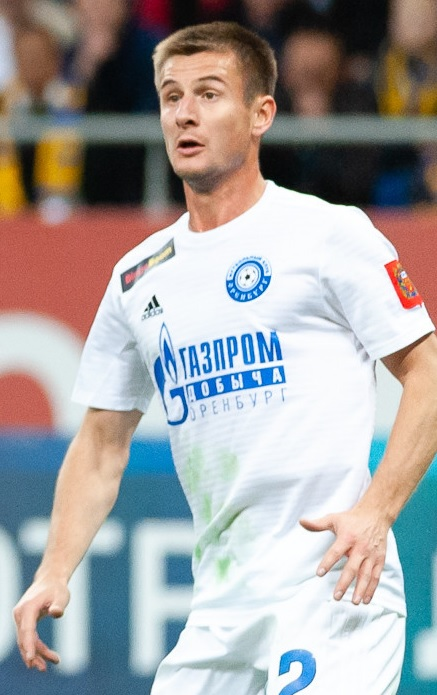
- Malykh with FC Orenburg in 2018

Personal information
- Full name: Andrei Sergeyevich Malykh
- Date of birth: 24 August 1988 (age 38)
- Place of birth: Kirov, Russian SFSR
- Height: 1.76 m (5 ft 9 in)
- Position: Right-back

Team information
- Current team: Dynamo Kirov
- Number: 12

Youth career
- DYuSSh-5 Kirov

Senior career*
Years	Team	Apps	(Gls)
2005–2009	Dynamo Kirov	95	(4)
2010–2025	Orenburg	362	(12)
2025–	Dynamo Kirov	47	(3)
- * Club domestic league appearances and goals as of 15 November 2026

Andrei Sergeyevich Malykh (Russian: Андрей Серге́евич Малых; born 24 August 1988) is a Russian professional football player who plays as a right-back for Dynamo Kirov.

== Club career ==
On 28 May 2022, Malykh scored an added-time winning goal for Orenburg in promotion play-offs against Ufa which secured Orenburg's victory and promotion to the Russian Premier League.

== Career statistics ==
As of match played 24 May 2025

Appearances and goals by club, season and competition
Club	Season	League			Cup		Europe		Other		Total	
Club	Season	Division	Apps	Goals	Apps	Goals	Apps	Goals	Apps	Goals	Apps	Goals
Dynamo Kirov	2005	Russian Second League	8	0	0	0	–		–		8	0
Dynamo Kirov	2006	Russian Second League	15	0	4	0	–		–		19	0
Dynamo Kirov	2007	Russian Second League	23	1	2	0	–		–		25	1
Dynamo Kirov	2008	Russian Second League	26	1	2	1	–		–		28	2
Dynamo Kirov	2009	Russian Second League	23	2	1	0	–		–		24	2
Dynamo Kirov	Total		95	4	9	1	0	0	0	0	104	5
Orenburg	2010	Russian Second League	21	0	3	1	–		–		24	1
Orenburg	2011–12	Russian First League	32	2	1	0	–		–		33	2
Orenburg	2012–13	Russian Second League	24	2	4	0	–		–		28	2
Orenburg	2013–14	Russian First League	29	0	2	0	–		–		31	0
Orenburg	2014–15	Russian First League	28	1	3	0	–		1 (Note: Appearances in the FNL Cup)	0	32	1
Orenburg	2015–16	Russian First League	32	2	1	0	–		2	0	35	2
Orenburg	2016–17	Russian Premier League	26	0	2	0	–		2 (Note: Appearances in the relegation play-offs)	0	30	0
Orenburg	2017–18	Russian First League	32	2	2	0	–		–		34	2
Orenburg	2018–19	Russian Premier League	23	0	2	0	–		–		25	0
Orenburg	2019–20	Russian Premier League	23	1	1	0	–		–		24	1
Orenburg	2020–21	Russian First League	32	0	0	0	–		–		32	0
Orenburg	2021–22	Russian First League	32	2	2	0	–		2 (Note: Appearances in the promotion play-offs)	2	36	4
Orenburg	2022–23	Russian Premier League	8	0	4	0	–		–		12	0
Orenburg	2023–24	Russian Premier League	2	0	2	0	–		–		4	0
Orenburg	2024–25	Russian Premier League	18	0	0	0	—		—		18	0
Orenburg	Total		362	12	29	1	0	0	7	2	398	15
Career total			456	16	38	2	0	0	7	2	501	20
