= FC Ryazan (2010) =

Football club from Ryazan, Russia

Ryazan FC
- Full name: Ryazan Football Club
- Founded: 2010
- Ground: Spartak Stadium, Ryazan
- Capacity: 5,880
- Chairman: Dmitry Malakhov
- Manager: Andrei Kozlov
- League: Russian Second League, Division B, Group 3
- 2026: 4th
- Website: pfcryazan.ru
Home colours	Away colours

Old logo

FC Ryazan (Russian: ФК "Рязань"), formerly FC Zvezda Ryazan or FC Star Ryazan, is an association football club from Ryazan, Russia, founded in 2010 after the previous FC Ryazan was dissolved. It plays in the fourth-tier Russian Second League Division B.

The team was originally named FC Zvezda Ryazan, but was renamed to FC Ryazan before the 2014–15 season.

== Current squad ==
As of 11 September 2026, according to the Second League website.

Note: Flags indicate national team as defined under FIFA eligibility rules; some limited exceptions apply. Players may hold more than one non-FIFA nationality.

No.	Pos.	Nation	Player
1	GK	RUS	Kirill Avdeyev
4	DF	RUS	Denis Perfilov
7	MF	RUS	Ansor Khabibov
8	MF	RUS	Artyom Borovitsky
10	FW	RUS	Stepan Obryvkov
11	FW	RUS	Nikita Pogrebnev
13	GK	RUS	Nikolay Zhuzhnev
14	FW	RUS	Artyom Yanin
15	DF	RUS	Roman Petrukhin
16	GK	RUS	Sergey Aminzhanov
17	FW	RUS	Stepan Avdyukhin
18	DF	RUS	Aleksandr Barkov
19	MF	RUS	Daniil Avdeyev
21	MF	RUS	Artyom Kotov

No.	Pos.	Nation	Player
22	FW	RUS	Yegor Dorokhov
23	MF	RUS	Konstantin Polyakov
25	MF	RUS	Dmitry Khokhlov
37	MF	RUS	Dmitry Gerasev
44	DF	RUS	Roman Shishkov (on loan from Shinnik Yaroslavl)
45	GK	RUS	David Sangaré
58	MF	RUS	Maksim Mishutin
76	DF	RUS	Arseny Prokurorov
77	DF	RUS	Islamzhan Nasyrov
82	DF	RUS	Svyatoslav Tses
87	MF	RUS	Yevgeny Yevgenyev
88	MF	RUS	Nikita Satarov
95	DF	RUS	Dmitry Li-Sa
99	MF	RUS	Ilya Tarasov

== Coaches ==
- (Soviet Union) Rizvan Tarasov
- (Soviet Union) Evgeny Kochargin
- (Russia) Igor Mythrenko
- (Russia) Oleg Lobanov
