= Dmitri Rudakov =

Russian footballer

Personal information
- Full name: Dmitri Igorevich Rudakov
- Date of birth: 10 April 1997 (age 29)
- Place of birth: Orenburg, Russia
- Height: 1.82 m (6 ft 0 in)
- Position: Forward

Youth career
- –2017: FC Orenburg

Senior career*
Years	Team	Apps	(Gls)
2017–2019	FC Orenburg	0	(0)
2017–2018	→ FC Orenburg-2	24	(4)
2018–2019	→ FC Neftekhimik Nizhnekamsk (loan)	14	(2)
2019–2020	FC Nosta Novotroitsk	16	(2)
2020–2021	FC Volna Nizhny Novgorod Oblast	12	(3)
2021–2022	FC Tekstilshchik Ivanovo	14	(0)
2022	FC Forte Taganrog	9	(2)
- * Club domestic league appearances and goals

Dmitri Igorevich Rudakov (Russian: Дмитрий Игоревич Рудаков; born 10 April 1997) is a Russian former football player.

== Club career ==
He made his debut in the Russian Football National League for FC Tekstilshchik Ivanovo on 10 July 2021 in a game against FC Rotor Volgograd.
