= Igor Koronov =

Russian footballer

Personal information
- Full name: Igor Petrovich Koronov
- Date of birth: 6 April 1986 (age 40)
- Place of birth: Brezhnev, Russia
- Height: 1.77 m (5 ft 10 in)
- Positions: Midfielder; defender

Senior career*
Years	Team	Apps	(Gls)
2006	FC Neftekhimik Nizhnekamsk	23	(4)
2007–2008	FC Alnas Almetyevsk	54	(3)
2009	→ FC Gornyak Uchaly (loan)	19	(1)
2010–2012	FC KAMAZ Naberezhnye Chelny	80	(16)
2012–2013	PFC Spartak Nalchik	52	(8)
2014–2018	FC Orenburg	89	(18)
2018	FC Tyumen	11	(0)
2019	FC KAMAZ Naberezhnye Chelny	5	(0)

International career
2005	Russia U-19	4	(0)
2011	Russia-2	1	(0)
- * Club domestic league appearances and goals

Igor Petrovich Koronov (Russian: Игорь Петрович Коронов; born 6 April 1986) is a Russian former professional football player. He played as a right midfielder.

== Club career ==
Koronov has played in the Russian Premier League with PFC Spartak Nalchik and FC Orenburg.
