= Aleksandr Rudenko (footballer, born 1993) =

Russian footballer

Personal information
- Full name: Aleksandr Stanislavovich Rudenko
- Date of birth: 4 March 1993 (age 33)
- Place of birth: Taganrog, Russia
- Height: 2.00 m (6 ft 6 1/2 in)
- Position: Goalkeeper

Team information
- Current team: Nosta Novotroitsk (manager)

Senior career*
Years	Team	Apps	(Gls)
2011–2012	Kuban Krasnodar	0	(0)
2012–2013	Torpedo Armavir	0	(0)
2013–2015	Chernomorets Novorossiysk	28	(0)
2015–2020	Orenburg	33	(0)

Managerial career
- 2022–2023: Orenburg (U19 GK coach)
- 2023: Orenburg (U19)
- 2024: Orenburg (U19 assistant)
- 2024: Orenburg (U19)
- 2025: Orenburg-2
- 2026–: Nosta Novotroitsk
- * Club domestic league appearances and goals

Aleksandr Stanislavovich Rudenko (Russian: Александр Станиславович Руденко; born 4 March 1993) is a Russian football coach and a former goalkeeper who is the manager of Nosta Novotroitsk.

== Club career ==
He made his debut in the Russian Second Division for Chernomorets Novorossiysk on 4 August 2013 in a game against Olimpia Volgograd.
