= Valentin Prilepin =

Russian footballer

Personal information
- Full name: Valentin Sergeyevich Prilepin
- Date of birth: 23 November 1999 (age 26)
- Height: 1.70 m (5 ft 7 in)
- Positions: Defender; midfielder

Senior career*
Years	Team	Apps	(Gls)
2016–2017	FC Orenburg	0	(0)
2017–2018	FC Orenburg-2	1	(0)
2018–2019	FC Orenburg	0	(0)
2019–2020	FC Zorky Krasnogorsk	11	(0)
2020	FC Volga Ulyanovsk	9	(0)
2021	FC Tambov	0	(0)
2021	FC Tuapse	1	(0)
- * Club domestic league appearances and goals

Valentin Sergeyevich Prilepin (Russian: Валентин Сергеевич Прилепин; born 23 November 1999) is a Russian former football player.

== Club career ==
He made his debut in the Russian Professional Football League for FC Orenburg-2 on 10 April 2018 in a game against FC Zenit-Izhevsk. He made his debut for the senior squad of FC Orenburg on 25 September 2018 in a Russian Cup game against FC Dynamo Barnaul.
