= Danila Kozlov (footballer, born 1997) =

Russian footballer (born 1997)

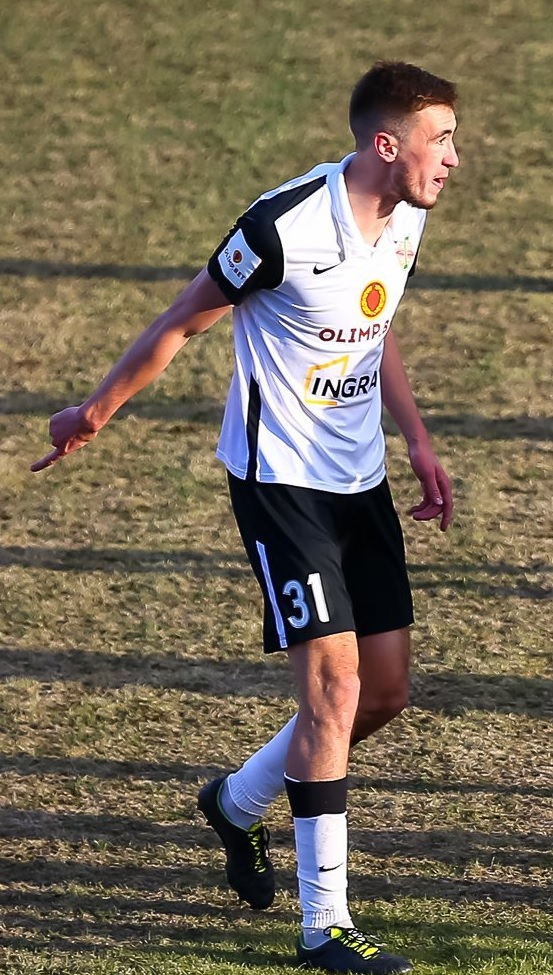
- Kozlov with Torpedo Moscow in 2021

Personal information
- Full name: Danila Igorevich Kozlov
- Date of birth: 18 June 1997 (age 29)
- Place of birth: Moscow, Russia
- Height: 1.95 m (6 ft 5 in)
- Position: Defender

Youth career
- Trudovyye Rezervy-Sportakademklub Moscow

Senior career*
| Years | Team | Apps | (Gls) |
| 2016–2017 | FC Sportakademklub Moscow (amateur) | | |
| 2017 | FC Orenburg | 0 | (0) |
| 2017 | FC Avangard Kursk | 0 | (0) |
| 2018–2021 | FC Volgar Astrakhan | 69 | (5) |
| 2021–2023 | FC Torpedo Moscow | 8 | (0) |
| 2021–2023 | → FC Volgar Astrakhan (loan) | 67 | (7) |
| 2023–2024 | FC Chelyabinsk | 35 | (4) |
| 2024–2026 | FC Leningradets Leningrad Oblast | 23 | (1) |
- * Club domestic league appearances and goals as of 13 June 2026

Danila Igorevich Kozlov (Russian: Данила Игоревич Козлов; born 18 June 1997) is a Russian football player.

== Club career ==
He made his debut in the Russian Football National League for FC Volgar Astrakhan on 17 March 2018 in a game against FC Shinnik Yaroslavl.

On 1 June 2021, he returned to FC Volgar Astrakhan on loan for the 2021–22 season. On 15 June 2022, he returned to Volgar once again for another season-long loan.
