= Andrei Kozlov (footballer, born 1973) =

Russian footballer and manager

Personal information
- Full name: Andrei Vasilyevich Kozlov
- Date of birth: 15 September 1973 (age 53)
- Place of birth: Belgorod, Russian SFSR
- Height: 1.78 m (5 ft 10 in)
- Positions: Forward; midfielder

Team information
- Current team: FC Ryazan (manager)

Youth career
- RO UOR Rostov-on-Don

Senior career*
Years	Team	Apps	(Gls)
1990	FC Atommash Volgodonsk	18	(0)
1991–1993	FC Rostselmash Rostov-on-Don	3	(0)
1992–1993	→ FC Rostselmash-2 Rostov-on-Don (loans)	44	(2)
1993	FC Shakhtyor Shakhty	20	(2)
1994–1995	FC SKA Rostov-on-Don	65	(17)
1996	FC Rostselmash Rostov-on-Don	2	(0)
1996	→ FC Rostselmash-2 Rostov-on-Don (loan)	5	(0)
1996	FC Torpedo Arzamas	18	(3)
1997–1998	FC Saturn Ramenskoye	49	(10)
1998	FC Lokomotiv Nizhny Novgorod	18	(3)
1999–2000	FC Amkar Perm	66	(3)
2001	FC Shinnik Yaroslavl	0	(0)
2002	FC Rubin Kazan	5	(0)
2002	FC Fakel-Voronezh Voronezh	5	(0)
2003	FC SKA-Energiya Khabarovsk	30	(4)
2004	FC Dynamo Stavropol	31	(7)
2004–2005	Khazar Lankaran FK		
2005	FC Gazovik-Gazprom Izhevsk	16	(0)
2006	FC Oryol	38	(0)
2007	FC SKA Rostov-on-Don	19	(0)
2008	FC Chayka Peschanokopskoye (amateur)		
2012	FC Viktor Ponedelnik Academy		

Managerial career
- 2008–2012: Viktor Ponedelnik Academy
- 2012–2014: FC SKVO Rostov-on-Don
- 2015–2017: FC Arsenal Tula (assistant)
- 2016: FC Arsenal Tula (caretaker)
- 2021–2022: FC SKA Rostov-on-Don
- 2022–2024: FC Arsenal-2 Tula
- 2026–: FC Ryazan
- * Club domestic league appearances and goals

Andrei Vasilyevich Kozlov (Russian: Андрей Васильевич Козлов; born 15 September 1973) is a Russian football manager and a former player who is the manager of FC Ryazan.
