= Marat Shogenov =

Russian footballer

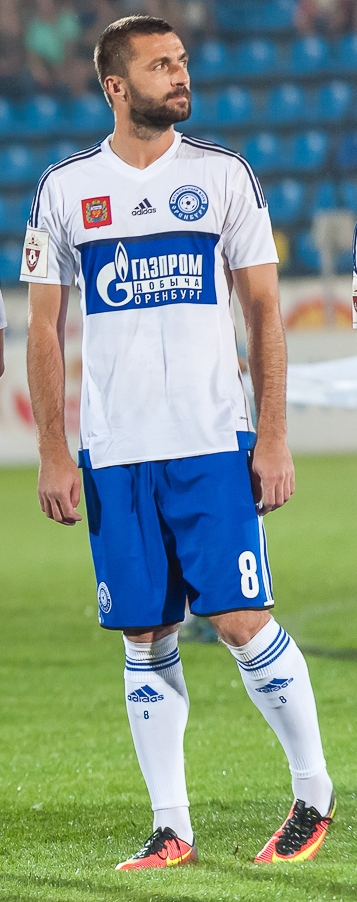
- Shogenov with FC Orenburg in 2016

Personal information
- Full name: Marat Zalimgeriyevich Shogenov
- Date of birth: 26 August 1984 (age 42)
- Place of birth: Nalchik, Soviet Union
- Height: 1.83 m (6 ft 0 in)
- Position: Midfielder

Senior career*
Years	Team	Apps	(Gls)
2002	FC Nart Nartkala	30	(0)
2003	PFC Spartak-2 Nalchik		
2004	PFC Spartak Nalchik	0	(0)
2004	FC Torpedo Volzhsky	14	(4)
2005	PFC Spartak Nalchik	14	(0)
2005	FC Torpedo Volzhsky	10	(4)
2006–2017	FC Orenburg	243	(84)
2012	→ PFC Spartak Nalchik (loan)	20	(4)
2017–2018	FC Avangard Kursk	9	(2)
2018	FC Fakel Voronezh	6	(0)
- * Club domestic league appearances and goals

Marat Zalimgeriyevich Shogenov (Russian: Марат Залимгериевич Шогенов; born 26 August 1984) is a Russian former professional football player.

== Honours ==
- Russian Second Division, Zone Ural-Povolzhye best player: 2010.
- Russian Second Division, Zone Ural-Povolzhye best midfielder: 2008, 2009, 2010.
- Russian Football National League player of the month: August 2015.
