= 2019–20 FC Orenburg season =

Orenburg
2019–20 season
- Chairman: Vasily Stolypin
- Manager: Vladimir Fedotov (until 8 December); Konstantin Yemelyanov (8 December - 22 May); Ilshat Aitkulov (caretaker) (from 22 May)
- Stadium: Gazovik Stadium
- Premier League: 16th (Relegated)
- Russian Cup: Round of 32 vs Khimki
- Top goalscorer: League: Đorđe Despotović (8); All: Đorđe Despotović (8)
Home colours	Away colours

The 2019–20 Orenburg season was the club's second season back in the Russian Premier League, the highest tier of association football in Russia, following their relegation at the end of the 2016–17, and their second in their 43-year history.

== Season events ==
On 8 December, manager Vladimir Fedotov resigned with Konstantin Yemelyanov being appointed as his replacement.

On 17 March, the Russian Premier League postponed all league fixtures until April 10 due to the COVID-19 pandemic.

On 1 April, the Russian Football Union extended the suspension of football until 31 May.

On 15 May, the Russian Football Union announced that the Russian Premier League season would resume on 21 June.

On 22 May, manager Konstantin Yemelyanov's contract expired, with Ilshat Aitkulov being appointed as caretaker manager.

On 26 June, it was announced that Orenburg's fixture against Krasnodar scheduled for 27 June would not take place due to an outbreak of COVID-19 in the Orenburg squad, and was subsequently awarded to Krasnodar as a 3-0 technical victory.

On 1 July, the Russian Premier League announced that that afternoon's game between Orenburg and Ural Yekaterinburg had been called off due to the continued outbreak of COVID-19 within the Orenburg squad.

== Squad ==
As of 11 June 2020

Note: Flags indicate national team as defined under FIFA eligibility rules; some limited exceptions apply. Players may hold more than one non-FIFA nationality.

No.	Pos.	Nation	Player
1	GK	RUS	Aleksandr Rudenko
3	DF	BLR	Mikhail Sivakow
4	DF	SRB	Uroš Radaković (on loan from Sparta Prague)
5	MF	RUS	Timur Ayupov
6	DF	ISR	Adi Gotlieb
8	MF	CRO	Danijel Miškić
10	MF	POR	Ricardo Alves
11	FW	RUS	Andrea Chukanov
12	DF	RUS	Andrei Malykh
13	DF	RUS	Sergei Terekhov
14	FW	SEN	Mamadou Sylla
15	DF	RUS	Georgi Zotov (on loan from Krylia Sovetov)
17	MF	SLO	Žiga Škoflek
18	DF	RUS	Danil Lipovoy (on loan from Dynamo Moscow)

No.	Pos.	Nation	Player
20	FW	GHA	Joel Fameyeh
22	FW	LTU	Fedor Černych (on loan from Dynamo Moscow)
23	MF	KAZ	Islambek Kuat
24	DF	RUS	Daniil Krivoruchko
31	DF	RUS	Vitali Shakhov
32	MF	RUS	Artyom Kulishev
33	MF	RUS	David Bidlovskiy
38	GK	BLR	Andrey Klimovich
42	DF	RUS	Ivan Lapshov
51	DF	RUS	Danil Khoroshkov
55	MF	RUS	Kirill Kaplenko (on loan from Zenit St.Petersburg)
57	MF	RUS	Yevgeni Bolotov
66	DF	RUS	Savely Kozlov

=== Out on loan ===
Note: Flags indicate national team as defined under FIFA eligibility rules; some limited exceptions apply. Players may hold more than one non-FIFA nationality.

No.	Pos.	Nation	Player
—	GK	RUS	Aleksei Kenyaykin (at Torpedo Moscow)

== Transfers ==
=== In ===
Date	Position	Nationality	Name	From	Fee	Ref.
12 July 2019	MF	(Russia)	Timur Ayupov	Nizhny Novgorod	Undisclosed	
12 July 2019	FW	(Ghana)	Joel Fameyeh	Wa All Stars	Undisclosed	
26 July 2019	MF	(Israel)	Adi Gotlieb	Hapoel Tel Aviv	Undisclosed	
23 August 2019	MF	(Slovenia)	Žiga Škoflek	Rudar Velenje	Undisclosed	
30 August 2019	GK	(Belarus)	Andrey Klimovich	Shakhtyor Soligorsk	Undisclosed	
2 September 2019	DF	(Russia)	Ivan Lapshov	Lokomotiv Moscow	Undisclosed	
2 September 2019	MF	(Sweden)	Filip Rogić	Örebro	Undisclosed	
1 January 2020	MF	(Kazakhstan)	Islambek Kuat	Kairat	Free	
5 January 2020	FW	(Senegal)	Mamadou Sylla	Gent	Undisclosed	

=== Loans in ===
Date from	Position	Nationality	Name	From	Date to	Ref.
26 July 2019	FW	(Russia)	Artyom Galadzhan	Lokomotiv Moscow	24 January 2020	
26 July 2019	DF	(Russia)	Georgi Zotov	Krylia Sovetov	End of Season	
21 August 2019	MF	(Russia)	Vladimir Moskvichyov	Dynamo Moscow	9 January 2020	
21 August 2019	FW	(Lithuania)	Fedor Černych	Dynamo Moscow	End of Season	
23 August 2019	DF	(Russia)	Danil Lipovoy	Dynamo Moscow	End of Season	
3 September 2019	DF	(Serbia)	Uroš Radaković	Sparta Prague	End of Season	
21 February 2020	MF	(Russia)	Kirill Kaplenko	Zenit St.Petersburg	End of Season	

=== Out ===
Date	Position	Nationality	Name	To	Fee	Ref.
27 June 2019	FW	(Russia)	Andrei Kozlov	Ufa	Undisclosed	
29 June 2019	DF	(Croatia)	Silvije Begić	Rubin Kazan	Undisclosed	
3 July 2019	MF	(Slovenia)	Denis Popović	Zürich	Undisclosed	
29 June 2019	MF	(Russia)	Aleksei Sutormin	Rubin Kazan	Undisclosed	

=== Loans out ===
Date from	Position	Nationality	Name	To	Date to	Ref.
4 July 2019	GK	(Russia)	Aleksei Kenyaykin	Torpedo Moscow	End of Season	

=== Released ===
Date	Position	Nationality	Name	Joined	Date
31 May 2019	MF	(Russia)	Sergei Breyev	Avangard Kursk	1 July 2019
31 May 2019	DF	(Russia)	Adessoye Oyewole	Tambov	8 June 2019
31 May 2019	MF	(Russia)	Grigori Chirkin	Avangard Kursk	7 June 2019
29 June 2019	GK	(Russia)	Yevgeny Frolov	Sochi	
1 July 2019	MF	(Russia)	Dmitri Andreyev	Retired	
19 February 2020	MF	(Russia)	Nikita Malyarov	Khimki	
19 February 2020	MF	(Uzbekistan)	Vadim Afonin	Lokomotiv Tashkent	2 March 2020
1 June 2020	GK	(Russia)	Aleksandr Dovbnya		
1 June 2020	FW	(Serbia)	Đorđe Despotović	Rubin Kazan	21 July 2020
11 June 2020	MF	(Sweden)	Filip Rogić		

== Friendlies ==
18 January 2020	Orenburg (Russia)	0–1	(Slovakia) Slovan Bratislava	Belek, Turkey
19:00 YEKT (UTC+5)		Report	Ljubičić 6'

21 January 2020	Orenburg (Russia)	2–3	(Bulgaria) Slavia Sofia	Belek, Turkey
18:30 YEKT (UTC+5)	Zotov 75'; Kulishev 89'	Report	Kirilov 44'; Stoev 62'; Yomov 84'

28 January 2020	Orenburg (Russia)	2–0	(Czech Republic) Sigma Olomouc	Belek, Turkey
19:00 YEKT (UTC+5)	Sivakow (red card) 24'	Report	González 24' (pen.); M.Chytil 58'

31 January 2020	Orenburg (Russia)	2–2	(Bosnia and Herzegovina) Borac Banja Luka	Belek, Turkey
19:00 YEKT (UTC+5)	Despotović 31', 35'	Report	Kajkut 26'; Vujaklija 75'

3 February 2020	Orenburg (Russia)	1–0	(Denmark) Esbjerg	Belek, Turkey
19:00 YEKT (UTC+5)	Sylla 47'	Report

6 February 2020	Orenburg (Russia)	1–0	(Latvia) Spartaks Jūrmala	Belek, Turkey
19:00 YEKT (UTC+5)	Despotović 19'	Report

14 February 2020	Orenburg (Russia)	1–0	(China) Dalian Professional	Marbella, Spain
20:00 YEKT (UTC+5)	Despotović 52'	Report

18 February 2020	Orenburg (Russia)	3–0	(Gibraltar) Europa	Marbella, Spain
20:00 YEKT (UTC+5)	Alves 59'; Lipovoy 83'; Kulishev 87'	Report

21 February 2020	Orenburg (Russia)	1–1	(Norway) Sarpsborg 08	Marbella, Spain
20:00 YEKT (UTC+5)	Fameyeh 67'	Report	Abdellaoue 82'

== Competitions ==
=== Premier League ===
==== Results by round ====
Round	1	2	3	4	5	6	7	8	9	10	11	12	13	14	15	16	17	18	19	20	21	22	23	24	25	26	27	28	29	30
Ground	A	A	H	A	H	H	A	A	H	H	A	H	H	A	A	H	H	A	A	H	A	H	A	H	H	A	H	H	A	A
Result	L	L	L	L	D	D	L	W	W	L	W	W	L	D	W	D	L	L	D	W	L	L	L	L	L	L	L	D	L	W
Position	12	14	15	16	16	16	16	15	13	14	11	8	12	12	8	8	10	14	14	11	11	13	15	15	16	16	16	16	16	16

Updated to match(es) played on 22 July 2020. Source: See Results
A = Away; H = Home; W = Win; D = Draw; L = Loss

==== Results ====
13 July 2019 1	Rostov	2 – 1	Orenburg	Rostov-on-Don
23:30 YEKT (UTC+5)	Shomurodov 11'; Bayramyan (yellow card) 26'; Ionov 42'; Normann (yellow card) 54'	Report	Malyarov (yellow card) 43'; Despotović 49'; Sivakow (yellow card) 52'; Afonin (yellow card) 81'	Stadium: Rostov Arena; Attendance: 14,584; Referee: Vladislav Bezborodov

20 July 2019 2	CSKA Moscow	2 – 1	Orenburg	Moscow
21:00 YEKT (UTC+5)	Vlašić 30'; Sigurðsson 38' (yellow card) 79'; Akinfeev (yellow card) 72'	Report	Malyarov 40'; Shakhov (yellow card) 53'; Ayupov (yellow card) 72'; Terekhov (yellow card) 79'	Stadium: VEB Arena; Attendance: 15,082; Referee: Evgeny Turbin

28 July 2019 3	Orenburg	0 – 2	Zenit St.Petersburg	Orenburg
16:00 YEKT (UTC+5)	Kozlov (yellow card) 54'; Dovbnya (yellow card) 89'	Report	Azmoun 1'; Dzyuba 55' (pen.) (yellow card) 65'; Sutormin (yellow card) 77'; Barrios (yellow card) 80'	Stadium: Gazovik Stadium; Attendance: 6,626; Referee: Sergei Karasev

5 August 2019 4	Akhmat Grozny	2 – 1	Orenburg	Grozny
22:00 YEKT (UTC+5)	Shvets (yellow card) 23'; Nižić (yellow card) 26'; Kharin 49'; Roshi 70'; Glushakov (yellow card) 90+3'	Report	Shakhov (yellow card) 4'; Despotović 64' (yellow card) 69'	Stadium: Akhmat-Arena; Attendance: 11,721; Referee: Nikolay Voloshin

10 August 2019 5	Orenburg	2 – 2	Tambov	Orenburg
16:00 YEKT (UTC+5)	Fameyeh 74', 78'; Shakhov (yellow card) 75'	Report	Gogoua 26'; Ciupercă (yellow card) 34' (yellow-red card) 85'; Mamtov 68'	Stadium: Gazovik Stadium; Attendance: 4,076; Referee: Pavel Kukuyan

16 August 2019 6	Orenburg	1 – 1	Sochi	Orenburg
20:00 YEKT (UTC+5)	Ayupov (yellow card) 22'; Miškić (yellow card) 42'; Kalugin 46' (o.g.); Despotović (yellow card) 84'	Report	Novoseltsev (yellow card) 19'; Tsallagov (yellow card) 63'; Poloz 68' (pen.); Noboa (yellow card) 90+2'	Stadium: Gazovik Stadium; Attendance: 4,411; Referee: Mikhail Vilkov

25 August 2019 7	Arsenal Tula	2 – 1	Orenburg	Tula
23:30 YEKT (UTC+5)	Lomovitsky 23'; Lutsenko 69'	Report	Despotović (yellow card) 21' (goal) 52'	Stadium: Arsenal Stadium; Attendance: 8,347; Referee: Aleksey Sukhoy

31 August 2019 8	Ufa	1 – 2	Orenburg	Yekaterinburg
13:30 YEKT (UTC+5)	Carp (yellow card) 2'; Putsko (yellow card) 39' (yellow-red card) 45+1'; Krotov 68'	Report	Shakhov (yellow card) 22' (yellow-red card) 53'; Despotović 40' (pen.); Ayupov (yellow card) 45'; Zotov 66'; Afonin (yellow card) 90+1'	Stadium: Central Stadium; Attendance: 6,892; Referee: Igor Panin

15 September 2019 9	Orenburg	2 – 1	Rubin Kazan	Orenburg
16:00 YEKT (UTC+5)	Škoflek (yellow card) 13'; Alves 49'; Ayupov (yellow card) 77'; Kulishev 89' (pen.)	Report	Bashkirov 53' (yellow card) 54'; Stepanov (yellow card) 59'; Uremović (yellow card) 88'; Pliyev (yellow card) 90'	Stadium: Gazovik Stadium; Attendance: 4,767; Referee: Sergey Lapochkin

22 September 2019 10	Orenburg	2 – 3	Lokomotiv Moscow	Orenburg
13:30 YEKT (UTC+5)	Rogić 69'; Kulishev 90+2'	Report	Barinov 10'; Ignatyev (yellow card) 33'; Zhivoglyadov (yellow card) 45+1'; Smolov 48' (pen.); Kolomeytsev (yellow card) 77'; Eder 88'	Stadium: Gazovik Stadium; Attendance: 4,854; Referee: Sergey Ivanov

29 September 2019 11	Spartak Moscow	1 – 2	Orenburg	Moscow
18:30 YEKT (UTC+5)	Kutepov (yellow card) 6'; Melgarejo 65'; Bakayev (yellow card) 90+4'		Terekhov (yellow card) 21'; Miškić (yellow card) 32' (yellow-red card) 71'; Malykh 45'; Despotović 63'	Stadium: Otkritie Arena; Attendance: 20,817; Referee: Stanislav Vasilyev

5 October 2019 12	Orenburg	2 – 0	Orenburg	Orenburg
16:00 YEKT (UTC+5)	Radaković (yellow card) 36' (goal) 88'; Kulishev 61'	Report	Yusupov (yellow card) 21' (yellow-red card) 42'; Yevgenyev (yellow card) 82'	Stadium: Gazovik Stadium; Attendance: 4,062; Referee: Pavel Kukuyan

20 October 2019 13	Orenburg	0 – 1	Krylia Sovetov	Orenburg
13:30 YEKT (UTC+5)	Rogić (yellow card) 45'; Alves (yellow card) 56'; Ayupov (yellow card) 90+3'	Report	Anton 18' (yellow card) 63'; Kanunnikov (yellow card) 27'; Ryzhikov (yellow card) 89'; Anyukov (red card) 90+3'	Stadium: Gazovik Stadium; Attendance: 4,311; Referee: Vasili Kazartsev

27 October 2019 14	Krasnodar	1 – 1	Orenburg	Krasnodar
21:00 YEKT (UTC+5)	Fernandes 43'; Berg (red card) 80'	Report	Despotović (yellow card) 19' (goal) 32'	Stadium: Krasnodar Stadium; Attendance: 30,638; Referee: Aleksei Matyunin

4 November 2019 15	Ural Yekaterinburg	1 – 2	Orenburg	Yekaterinburg
16:00 YEKT (UTC+5)	Haroyan (yellow card) 57'; Bicfalvi 64'; El Kabir (yellow card) 83'	Report	Fameyeh 4'; Ayupov (yellow card) 7'; Alves 45+1'; Terekhov (yellow card) 72'	Stadium: Central Stadium; Attendance: 6,797; Referee: Stanislav Vasilyev

10 November 2019 16	Orenburg	0 – 0	Ufa	Orenburg
13:30 YEKT (UTC+5)	Radaković (yellow card) 73'; Ayupov (yellow card) 90'	Report		Stadium: Gazovik Stadium; Attendance: 2,582; Referee: Mikhail Vilkov

23 November 2019 17	Orenburg	1 – 2	Akhmat Grozny	Orenburg
13:30 YEKT (UTC+5)	Ayupov (yellow card) 35'; Dovbnya (yellow card) 39'; Malykh (yellow card) 72'; Škoflek 90'	Report	Gigolayev (yellow card) 33'; Ponce 36' (pen.); Ivanov (yellow card) 64'; Roshi (yellow card) 66' (goal) 74'	Stadium: Gazovik Stadium; Attendance: 1,745; Referee: Aleksei Eskov

1 December 2019 18	Sochi	–	Orenburg	Sochi
16:00 YEKT (UTC+5)				Stadium: Fisht Olympic Stadium
Note: Match postponed due to a viral infection in the Sochi squad.

7 December 2019 19	Tambov	3 – 0	Orenburg	Saransk
16:00 YEKT (UTC+5)	Radaković 47' (o.g.); Obukhov 65'; Kilin 82'; Melkadze (yellow card) 88'	Report	Zotov (yellow card) 37' (yellow-red card) 51'; Škoflek (yellow card) 44'; Rogić (yellow card) 47'; Sivakow (yellow card) 52'; Miškić (yellow card) 67'	Stadium: Mordovia Arena; Attendance: 835; Referee: Vladislav Bezborodov
Note: Match played at the Mordovia Arena in Saransk instead of Tambov's regular Spartak Stadium.

28 February 2020 20	Krylia Sovetov	1 – 1	Orenburg	Samara
20:30 YEKT (UTC+5)	Mijailović (red card) 23'; Popović 42' (yellow card) 59'	Report	Despotović (penalty missed) 24' (yellow card) 73'; Kuat (yellow card) 31'; Malykh (yellow card) 40'; Alves 89'; Radaković (yellow card) 90+1'; Sivakow (yellow card) 90+2'	Stadium: Samara Arena; Attendance: 8,139; Referee: Vitali Meshkov

7 March 2020 21	Orenburg	2 – 0	Arsenal Tula	Orenburg
16:00 YEKT (UTC+5)	Despotović 13', 77'; Kuat (yellow card) 51'; Fameyeh (yellow card) 81'; Ayupov (yellow card) 90'	Report	Grigalava (yellow card) 16'; Čaušić (yellow card) 44'; Lomovitsky (yellow card) 50'; Bauer (yellow card) 65' (yellow-red card) 74'; Kombarov (yellow card) 70'	Stadium: Gazovik Stadium; Attendance: 2,457; Referee: Pavel Kukuyan

11 March 2020 18	Sochi	5 – 1	Orenburg	Sochi
21:30 YEKT (UTC+5)	Ayupov 24' (o.g.); Kokorin 35' (pen.), 62'; Mostovoy 73'; Noboa (yellow card) 78'	Report	Fameyeh 84' (yellow card) 87'	Stadium: Fisht Olympic Stadium; Attendance: 5,147; Referee: Evgeny Turbin
Note: Match originally scheduled for 1 December 2019 but postponed due to a viral infection in the Sochi squad.

14 March 2020 22	Orenburg	0 – 3	Spartak Moscow	Orenburg
16:00 YEKT (UTC+5)	Fameyeh 17'; Terekhov (yellow card) 45+3'; Miškić (yellow card) 56'	Report	Maslov (yellow card) 29'; Ponce 44'; Larsson 71'; Ayrton (yellow card) 90+3'; Mirzov 90+4'	Stadium: Gazovik Stadium; Attendance: 4,935; Referee: Vasiliy Kazartsev

21 June 2020 23	Lokomotiv Moscow	1 – 0	Orenburg	Moscow
19:30 YEKT (UTC+5)	Zhemaletdinov (yellow card) 19' (yellow-red card) 45+4'; Al.Miranchuk 38'; Murilo (yellow card) 52'; Barinov (yellow card) 79'; Eder (penalty missed) 90+4'	Report	Miškić (yellow card) 41' (yellow-red card) 58'; Malykh (yellow card) 57' (yellow-red card) 84'; Sylla (yellow card) 63'; Fameyeh (yellow card) 70'; Ayupov (yellow card) 71'; Zotov (yellow card) 80'; Radaković (yellow card) 90+3'	Stadium: RZD Arena; Referee: Stanislav Vasilyev
Note: Match originally scheduled for 21 March, but postponed on 17 March due to the COVID-19 pandemic.

27 June 2020 24	Orenburg	0 – 3	Krasnodar	Orenburg
16:00 YEKT (UTC+5)				Stadium: Gazovik Stadium
Note: Match originally scheduled for 5 April, but postponed on 17 March due to the COVID-19 pandemic. On 26 June it was the match would not take place due to an outbreak of COVID-19 in the Orenburg squad, and was awarded as a 3-0 victory to Krasnodar.

1 July 2020 25	Orenburg	0 – 3	Ural Yekaterinburg	Orenburg
17:00 YEKT (UTC+5)				Stadium: Gazovik Stadium
Note: Match originally scheduled for 11 April, but postponed on 1 April due to the COVID-19 pandemic. Match postponed again on 1 July due to an outbreak of COVID-19 in the Orenburg squad, and was awarded as a 3-0 victory to Ural.

5 July 2020 26	Rubin Kazan	1 – 0	Orenburg	Kazan
20:30 YEKT (UTC+5)	Makarov 67'; Samoshnikov (yellow card) 85'; Starfelt (yellow card) 90+2'	Report	Kulishev (yellow card) 23'; Zotov (yellow card) 72'	Stadium: Central Stadium; Referee: Kirill Levnikov
Note: Match originally scheduled for 18 April, but postponed on 1 April due to the COVID-19 pandemic.

8 July 2020 27	Orenburg	0 – 4	CSKA Moscow	Orenburg
20:30 YEKT (UTC+5)	Fameyeh (yellow card) 25'; Kulishev (yellow card) 51'; Krivoruchko (yellow card) 84'; Terekhov (yellow card) 90+1'	Report	Chalov 32'; Diveyev (yellow card) 47'; Nababkin (yellow card) 57'; Vlašić 59'; Shchennikov 78'; Oblyakov 90+4'	Stadium: Gazovik Stadium; Referee: Aleksey Sukhoy
Note: Match originally scheduled for 26 April, but postponed on 1 April due to the COVID-19 pandemic.

12 July 2020 28	Orenburg	0 – 0	Rostov	Orenburg
20:30 YEKT (UTC+5)	Malykh (yellow card) 19'	Report	Normann (yellow card) 44'	Stadium: Gazovik Stadium; Referee: Igor Panin
Note: Match originally scheduled for 2 May, but postponed on 1 April due to the COVID-19 pandemic.

15 July 2020 29	Zenit St.Petersburg	4 – 1	Orenburg	Saint Petersburg
22:30 YEKT (UTC+5)	Malykh 2' (o.g.); Ozdoyev (yellow card) 34'; Prokhin (yellow card) 53'; Azmoun 61', 77'; Shamkin (yellow card) 73'; Rakitskiy (yellow card) 75'; Dzyuba 90+1'	Report	Shakhov (yellow card) 30'; Fameyeh 32' (yellow card) 37'; Terekhov (yellow card) 65'; Škoflek (yellow card) 90'	Stadium: Krestovsky Stadium; Referee: Vitali Meshkov
Note: Match originally scheduled for 6 May, but postponed on 1 April due to the COVID-19 pandemic.

22 July 2020 30	Dynamo Moscow	0 – 1	Orenburg	Moscow
21:00 YEKT (UTC+5)	Philipp (yellow card) 34'; Morozov (yellow card) 90+1'	Report	Ayupov (yellow card) 35'; Fameyeh 29'; Terekhov (yellow card) 38'; Sivakow (yellow card) 39'	Stadium: VTB Arena; Referee: Sergey Lapochkin
Note: Match originally scheduled for 17 May, but postponed on 1 April due to the COVID-19 pandemic.

==== League table ====
Pos	Team	Pld	W	D	L	GF	GA	GD	Pts	Qualification or relegation
12	Sochi	30	8	9	13	40	39	+1	33	
13	Akhmat Grozny	30	7	10	13	27	46	−19	31 (Note: Head-to-head points: Akhmat Grozny 8, Tambov 4, Krylia Sovetov Samara 4. Head-to-head goal difference: Akhmat Grozny +3, Tambov 0, Krylia Sovetov Samara –3)	
14	Tambov	30	9	4	17	37	41	−4	31	
15	Krylia Sovetov Samara (R)	30	8	7	15	33	40	−7	31	Relegation to Football National League
16	Orenburg (R)	30	7	6	17	28	52	−24	27	Relegation to Football National League

Source: Russian Premier Liga, Soccerway
Rules for classification: 1) Points; 2) Head-to-head points; 3) Head-to-head matches won; 4) Head-to-head goal difference; 5) Head-to-head goals scored; 6) Matches won; 7) Goal difference; 8) Goals scored; 9) Play-off.
(R) Relegated

=== Russian Cup ===
25 September 2019 Round of 32	Chertanovo Moscow	0 – 2 (a.e.t.)	Orenburg	Chertanovo
21:00 YEKT (UTC+5)	Kondakov (yellow card) 12' (yellow-red card) 37'; Zavezyon (yellow card) 13'; Gorshkov (yellow card) 78'; Prutsev (yellow card) 96'	Report	Chukanov (yellow card) 48'; Ayupov (yellow card) 60'; Shakhov (yellow card) 64'; Radaković (yellow card) 68'; Sivakow (yellow card) 80'; Malykh (yellow card) 92'; Fameyeh 105'; Terekhov (yellow card) 111'; Kulishev 117'	Stadium: Arena Chertanovo; Attendance: 750; Referee: Anatoliy Zhabchenko

31 October 2019 Round of 32	Orenburg	1 – 2	Khimki	Orenburg
18:00 YEKT (UTC+5)	Alves (yellow card) 26'; Despotović 50' (yellow card) 80'; Terekhov (yellow card) 59'	Report	Polyarus 1', 21'; Pochivalin (yellow card) 15'; Dyadyun (yellow card) 28'; Barkov (yellow card) 81'; Troshechkin (yellow card) 90+1'	Stadium: Gazovik Stadium; Attendance: 2,356; Referee: Pavel Shadykhanov

== Squad statistics ==
As of match played 22 July 2020

=== Appearances and goals ===
No.	Pos	Nat	Player	Total		Premier League		Russian Cup	
No.	Pos	Nat	Player	Apps	Goals	Apps	Goals	Apps	Goals
1	GK	(Russia) RUS	Aleksandr Rudenko	3	0	3	0	0	0
3	DF	(Belarus) BLR	Mikhail Sivakow	21	0	17+2	0	2	0
4	DF	(Serbia) SRB	Uroš Radaković	17	1	15	1	2	0
5	MF	(Russia) RUS	Timur Ayupov	24	0	20+2	0	2	0
6	DF	(Israel) ISR	Adi Gotlieb	5	0	4+1	0	0	0
8	MF	(Croatia) CRO	Danijel Miškić	22	0	22	0	0	0
10	MF	(Portugal) POR	Ricardo Alves	22	3	21	3	1	0
11	FW	(Russia) RUS	Andrea Chukanov	18	0	9+8	0	1	0
12	DF	(Russia) RUS	Andrei Malykh	24	1	23	1	0+1	0
13	DF	(Russia) RUS	Sergei Terekhov	29	0	27	0	2	0
14	FW	(Senegal) SEN	Mamadou Sylla	5	0	3+2	0	0	0
15	DF	(Russia) RUS	Georgi Zotov	22	1	18+2	1	2	0
17	MF	(Slovenia) SLO	Žiga Škoflek	11	1	7+4	1	0	0
18	DF	(Russia) RUS	Danil Lipovoy	6	0	4+1	0	0+1	0
20	FW	(Ghana) GHA	Joel Fameyeh	25	8	11+12	7	0+2	1
22	FW	(Lithuania) LTU	Fedor Černych	12	0	5+6	0	1	0
23	MF	(Kazakhstan) KAZ	Islambek Kuat	3	0	3	0	0	0
24	DF	(Russia) RUS	Daniil Krivoruchko	2	0	0+2	0	0	0
31	DF	(Russia) RUS	Vitali Shakhov	20	0	18	0	2	0
32	MF	(Russia) RUS	Artyom Kulishev	19	4	10+8	3	1	1
33	MF	(Russia) RUS	David Bidlovskiy	2	0	0+2	0	0	0
38	GK	(Belarus) BLR	Andrey Klimovich	21	0	20	0	1	0
42	DF	(Russia) RUS	Ivan Lapshov	1	0	0+1	0	0	0
51	DF	(Russia) RUS	Danil Khoroshkov	1	0	0+1	0	0	0
55	MF	(Russia) RUS	Kirill Kaplenko	1	0	0+1	0	0	0
66	DF	(Russia) RUS	Savely Kozlov	9	0	5+4	0	0	0
Players away from the club on loan:
Players who appeared for Orenburg but left during the season:
7	MF	(Sweden) SWE	Filip Rogić	12	1	10+1	1	1	0
9	FW	(Serbia) SRB	Đorđe Despotović	22	9	20	8	1+1	1
29	MF	(Uzbekistan) UZB	Vadim Afonin	11	0	5+5	0	1	0
56	GK	(Russia) RUS	Aleksandr Dovbnya	6	0	5	0	1	0
77	MF	(Russia) RUS	Nikita Malyarov	4	1	3	1	0+1	0
88	FW	(Russia) RUS	Artyom Galadzhan	5	0	0+4	0	1	0

=== Goal scorers ===
Place	Position	Nation	Number	Name	Premier League	Russian Cup	Total
1	FW	(Serbia)	9	Đorđe Despotović	8	1	9
2	FW	(Ghana)	20	Joel Fameyeh	7	1	8
3	MF	(Russia)	32	Artyom Kulishev	3	1	4
4	MF	(Portugal)	10	Ricardo Alves	3	0	3
5	MF	(Russia)	77	Nikita Malyarov	1	0	1
5	DF	(Russia)	15	Georgi Zotov	1	0	1
5	MF	(Sweden)	7	Filip Rogić	1	0	1
5	DF	(Russia)	12	Andrei Malykh	1	0	1
5	DF	(Serbia)	4	Uroš Radaković	1	0	1
5	MF	(Slovenia)	17	Žiga Škoflek	1	0	1
5				Own goal	1	0	1
Total					28	3	31

=== Clean sheets ===
Place	Position	Nation	Number	Name	Premier League	Russian Cup	Total
1	GK	(Belarus)	38	Andrey Klimovich	5	0	5
2	GK	(Russia)	56	Aleksandr Dovbnya	0	1	1
Total					5	1	6

=== Disciplinary record ===
Number	Nation	Position	Name	Premier League		Russian Cup		Total	
Number	Nation	Position	Name	Yellow card	Red card	Yellow card	Red card	Yellow card	Red card
3	(Belarus)	DF	Mikhail Sivakow	4	0	1	0	5	0
4	(Serbia)	DF	Uroš Radaković	4	0	1	0	5	0
5	(Russia)	MF	Timur Ayupov	11	0	1	0	12	0
8	(Croatia)	MF	Danijel Miškić	7	2	0	0	7	2
10	(Portugal)	MF	Ricardo Alves	1	0	1	0	2	0
11	(Russia)	FW	Andrea Chukanov	0	0	1	0	1	0
12	(Russia)	DF	Andrei Malykh	5	1	1	0	6	1
13	(Russia)	DF	Sergei Terekhov	7	0	2	0	9	0
14	(Senegal)	FW	Mamadou Sylla	1	0	0	0	1	0
15	(Russia)	DF	Georgi Zotov	4	1	0	0	4	1
17	(Slovenia)	MF	Žiga Škoflek	3	0	0	0	3	0
20	(Ghana)	FW	Joel Fameyeh	5	0	0	0	5	0
23	(Kazakhstan)	MF	Islambek Kuat	2	0	0	0	2	0
24	(Russia)	DF	Daniil Krivoruchko	1	0	0	0	1	0
31	(Russia)	DF	Vitali Shakhov	6	1	1	0	7	1
32	(Russia)	MF	Artyom Kulishev	2	0	0	0	2	0
66	(Russia)	DF	Savely Kozlov	1	0	0	0	1	0
Players away on loan:
Players who left Orenburg during the season:
7	(Sweden)	MF	Filip Rogić	2	0	0	0	2	0
9	(Serbia)	FW	Đorđe Despotović	5	0	1	0	6	0
29	(Uzbekistan)	MF	Vadim Afonin	2	0	0	0	2	0
56	(Russia)	GK	Aleksandr Dovbnya	2	0	0	0	2	0
77	(Russia)	MF	Nikita Malyarov	1	0	0	0	1	0
Total				75	5	10	0	85	5
