= Timur Ayupov =

Russian football midfielder

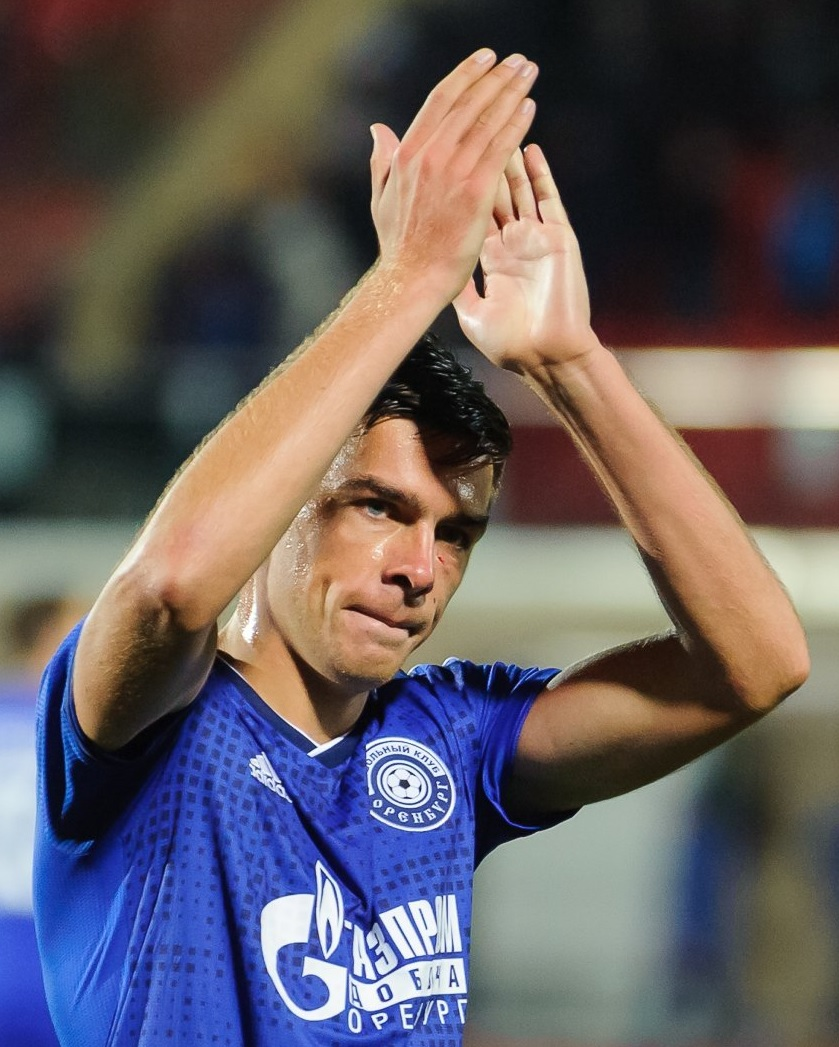
- Ayupov with FC Orenburg in 2019

Personal information
- Full name: Timur Ansarovich Ayupov
- Date of birth: 26 July 1993 (age 33)
- Place of birth: Moscow, Russia
- Height: 1.83 m (6 ft 0 in)
- Position: Defensive midfielder

Team information
- Current team: Rotor Volgograd
- Number: 8

Youth career
- 2013: FShM Moscow
- 2014–2015: Rubin Kazan

Senior career*
Years	Team	Apps	(Gls)
2013–2015	Rubin-2 Kazan	42	(4)
2016–2019	Nizhny Novgorod	92	(10)
2019–2023	Orenburg	108	(5)
2023–2026	Ural Yekaterinburg	75	(6)
2026–	Rotor Volgograd	0	(0)
- * Club domestic league appearances and goals as of 16 May 2026

Timur Ansarovich Ayupov (Russian: Тимур Ансарович Аюпов; born 26 July 1993) is a Russian football defensive midfielder who plays for Rotor Volgograd.

== Club career ==
He made his debut in the Russian Second Division for Rubin-2 Kazan on 1 August 2013 in a game against Nosta Novotroitsk.

On 12 July 2019, he signed a contract with Russian Premier League club Orenburg. He made his debut in the Russian Premier League for Orenburg on 13 July 2019 in a game against Rostov.

On 5 June 2023, Ayupov signed a two-year contract with Ural Yekaterinburg.

== Personal life ==
His father Ansar Ayupov also was a footballer.

== Career statistics ==
As of match played 14 July 2024

Appearances and goals by club, season and competition
Club	Season	League			Cup		Continental		Other		Total	
Club	Season	Division	Apps	Goals	Apps	Goals	Apps	Goals	Apps	Goals	Apps	Goals
Rubin-2 Kazan	2013–14	Russian Second League	24	2	—		—		—		24	2
Rubin-2 Kazan	2014–15	Russian Second League	18	2	—		—		—		18	2
Rubin-2 Kazan	Total		42	4	0	0	0	0	0	0	42	4
Nizhny Novgorod	2015–16	Russian Second League	9	0	—		—		—		9	0
Nizhny Novgorod	2016–17	Russian Second League	22	5	1	0	—		—		23	5
Nizhny Novgorod	2017–18	Russian First League	30	2	2	0	—		—		32	2
Nizhny Novgorod	2018–19	Russian First League	31	3	1	0	—		—		32	3
Nizhny Novgorod	Total		92	10	4	0	0	0	0	0	96	10
Orenburg	2019–20	Russian Premier League	22	0	2	0	—		—		24	0
Orenburg	2020–21	Russian First League	32	1	1	0	—		—		33	1
Orenburg	2021–22	Russian First League	31	0	1	0	—		2 (Note: Appearances in the promotion play-offs)	0	34	0
Orenburg	2022–23	Russian Premier League	23	4	4	0	—		—		27	4
Orenburg	Total		108	5	8	0	0	0	2	0	118	5
Ural Yekaterinburg	2023–24	Russian Premier League	24	1	7	1	–		1 (Note: Appearances in the relegation play-offs)	0	32	2
Ural Yekaterinburg	2024–25	Russian First League	1	1	0	0	—		—		1	1
Ural Yekaterinburg	Total		25	2	7	1	—		1	0	33	3
Career total			267	21	19	1	0	0	3	0	289	22
