= Ricardo Alves (footballer, born 1993) =

Portuguese footballer

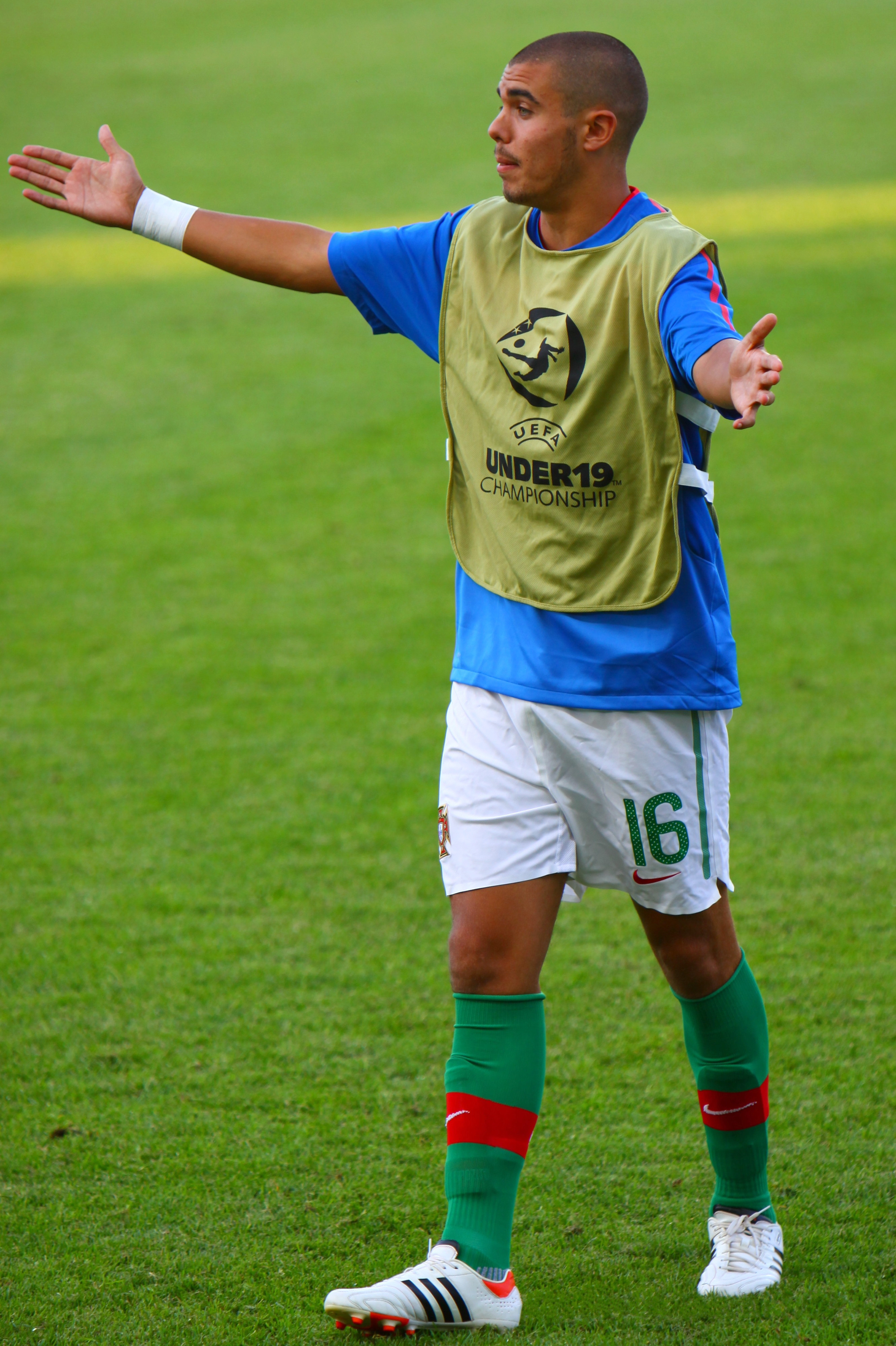

Personal information
- Full name: Ricardo Alves Coelho da Silva
- Date of birth: 25 March 1993 (age 33)
- Place of birth: Lourosa, Portugal
- Height: 1.84 m (6 ft 0 in)
- Position: Midfielder

Team information
- Current team: Sepahan
- Number: 10

Youth career
- 2001–2003: Lusitânia
- 2003–2006: Porto
- 2006: Boavista
- 2007: Pasteleira
- 2007–2008: Boavista
- 2008–2009: Padroense
- 2009–2012: Porto

Senior career*
Years	Team	Apps	(Gls)
2012–2014	Belenenses	13	(1)
2013–2014	→ Portimonense (loan)	15	(1)
2015	Rapid București	7	(0)
2015–2018	Olimpija Ljubljana	78	(15)
2018–2020	Orenburg	39	(7)
2021	Krylia Sovetov	12	(0)
2021–2022	Kairat	19	(0)
2022–2025	Tractor	82	(6)
2025–	Sepahan	16	(2)

International career
2008	Portugal U15	3	(0)
2009	Portugal U17	2	(0)
2011	Portugal U18	5	(4)
2011–2012	Portugal U19	12	(3)
2012–2013	Portugal U20	13	(1)
- * Club domestic league appearances and goals as of 08:24, 30 March 2026 (UTC)

Ricardo Alves Coelho da Silva (born 25 March 1993) is a Portuguese professional footballer who plays as a midfielder for Persian Gulf Pro League club Sepahan.

== Club career ==
=== Belenenses ===
Born in Lourosa (Santa Maria da Feira), Alves played youth football with mainly FC Porto, which he represented from ages 16 to 19 in his second stint. He made his senior debut with C.F. Os Belenenses on 1 August 2012, playing three minutes in a 1–0 home win against S.C. Freamunde in the first round of the Taça da Liga.

On 20 January 2013, Alves made his first appearance in the Segunda Liga, coming on as a second-half substitute in a 0–0 home draw with C.D. Santa Clara. In the ensuing summer he was loaned to Portimonense S.C. in the same league, which he later considered to be a "step back" in his career.

=== Olimpija ===
In the summer of 2015, after a short spell in Romania with FC Rapid București, Alves signed with NK Olimpija Ljubljana from the Slovenian PrvaLiga. He made his debut in top-flight football on 8 August, starting and scoring in a 2–0 away victory over NK Krško.

Alves and his team won the double in the 2017–18 campaign, with the player contributing a career-best ten league goals to the feat and adding one and two assists in the final of the domestic cup against NK Aluminij (6–1 in Ljubljana).

=== Later career ===
On 6 September 2018, Alves joined Russian Premier League club FC Orenburg. On 2 October 2020, his contract was terminated by mutual consent; he remained in the country nonetheless, moving to Football National League side PFC Krylia Sovetov Samara in February 2021.

Alves agreed to an 18-month contract with FC Kairat on 13 July 2021. One year later, he left for the Persian Gulf Pro League with Tractor SC. He won the national championship in his third season with the latter; one of his three goals was scored in the decisive match, from a penalty kick to close a 4–0 away win over Shams Azar FC.

Alves continued in the Iranian top division for 2025–26, with the 32-year-old joining Sepahan SC. The transfer sparked protests from Tractor, who claimed that he had a registered three-year contract with them. They subsequently filed a complaint with FIFA against both the club and the player; additionally, Alves took to the governing body to press charges against the Iranian Football League, citing lack of expedition in the handling of his case.

== International career ==
Alves was part of the Portugal squad at the 2013 FIFA U-20 World Cup held in Turkey, playing three matches in an eventual round-of-16 exit.

== Career statistics ==
As of match played 15 May 2025

Appearances and goals by club, season and competition
Club	Season	League			National cup (Note: Includes Taça de Portugal, Slovenian Football Cup, Russian Cup, Kazakhstan Cup, Hazfi Cup)		League cup (Note: Includes Taça da Liga)		Continental		Other		Total	
Club	Season	Division	Apps	Goals	Apps	Goals	Apps	Goals	Apps	Goals	Apps	Goals	Apps	Goals
Belenenses	2012–13	Segunda Liga	13	1	2	0	0	0	—		—		17	2
Portimonense (loan)	2013–14	Segunda Liga	15	1	0	0	2	0	—		—		18	1
Rapid București	2014–15	Liga I	7	0	0	0	—		—		—		7	0
Olimpija	2015–16	Slovenian PrvaLiga	24	3	2	0	—		—		—		26	3
Olimpija	2016–17	Slovenian PrvaLiga	21	2	4	0	—		2 (Note: Appearances in UEFA Champions League)	1	—		27	3
Olimpija	2017–18	Slovenian PrvaLiga	33	10	4	1	—		0	0	—		37	11
Olimpija	Total		78	15	10	1	—		2	1	—		90	17
Orenburg	2018–19	Russian Premier League	10	3	3	0	—		—		—		13	3
Orenburg	2019–20	Russian Premier League	21	3	1	0	—		—		—		22	3
Orenburg	2020–21	Russian First League	8	1	0	0	—		—		—		8	1
Orenburg	Total		39	7	4	0	—		—		—		43	7
Krylia Sovetov	2020–21	Russian First League	12	0	3	0	—		—		—		15	0
Kairat	2021	Kazakhstan Premier League	6	0	6	1	—		10 (Note: One appearance in UEFA Champions League, two appearances in UEFA Europa League, seven appearances and two goals in UEFA Europa Conference League)	2	—		22	3
Kairat	2022	Kazakhstan Premier League	13	0	0	0	—		0	0	1 (Note: Appearance in Kazakhstan Super Cup)	0	14	0
Kairat	Total		19	0	6	1	—		10	2	1	0	36	3
Tractor	2022–23	Persian Gulf Pro League	26	0	1	0	—		—		—		27	0
Tractor	2023–24	Persian Gulf Pro League	28	3	2	0	—		1 (Note: Appearance in AFC Champions League Elite)	0	—		31	3
Tractor	2024–25	Persian Gulf Pro League	28	3	1	0	—		8 (Note: Appearances in AFC Champions League Two)	2	0	0	37	5
Tractor	Total		82	6	4	0	—		9	2	0	0	95	8
Career total			265	30	29	2	2	0	21	5	1	0	318	37

== Honours ==
Belenenses

- Segunda Liga: 2012–13

Olimpija Ljubljana

- Slovenian PrvaLiga: 2015–16, 2017–18
- Slovenian Football Cup: 2017–18

Tractor

- Persian Gulf Pro League: 2024–25
