= Artyom Kulishev =

Russian footballer

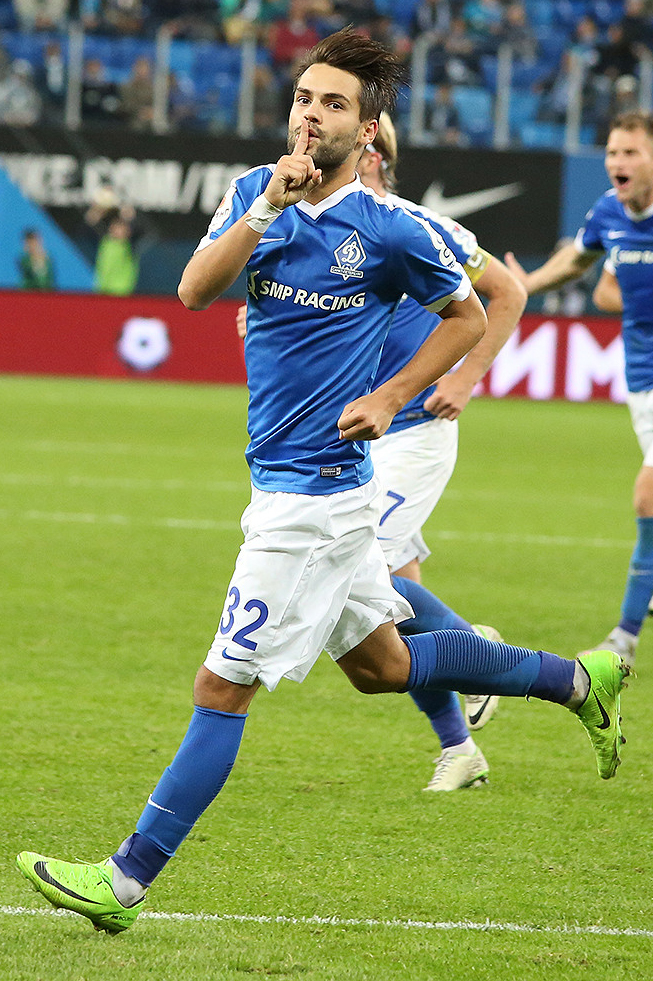
- Kulishev with Dynamo St. Petersburg in 2017

Personal information
- Full name: Artyom Aleksandrovich Kulishev
- Date of birth: 26 August 1993 (age 33)
- Place of birth: Rostov-on-Don, Russia
- Height: 1.77 m (5 ft 10 in)
- Position: Attacking midfielder

Team information
- Current team: Leningradets Leningrad Oblast
- Number: 32

Youth career
- Rostov

Senior career*
Years	Team	Apps	(Gls)
2012–2016	Rostov	2	(0)
2014–2015	→ Vityaz Podolsk (loan)	20	(8)
2015–2016	→ Dynamo St. Petersburg (loan)	17	(3)
2016–2018	Dynamo St. Petersburg	62	(30)
2018–2020	Orenburg	35	(6)
2020–2021	Chayka Peschanokopskoye	26	(5)
2021	Fakel Voronezh	21	(1)
2022	Kuban Krasnodar	9	(0)
2022–2023	Shinnik Yaroslavl	34	(5)
2023–2024	Khimki	14	(0)
2024–2025	Tyumen	20	(1)
2025–	Leningradets Leningrad Oblast	46	(10)
- * Club domestic league appearances and goals as of 13 June 2026

Artyom Aleksandrovich Kulishev (Russian: Артём Александрович Кулишев; born 26 August 1993) is a Russian professional football player who plays as an attacking midfielder for Leningradets Leningrad Oblast. He has also played as a second striker or a winger.

== Club career ==
He made his debut in the Russian Premier League on 3 August 2013 for Rostov in a game against Anzhi Makhachkala.

== Honours ==
=== Individual ===
- 2017–18 Russian Football National League top scorer with Dynamo St. Petersburg: 17 goals.

== Career statistics ==
As of 25 May 2024

Club	Season	League			Cup		Continental		Other		Total	
Club	Season	Division	Apps	Goals	Apps	Goals	Apps	Goals	Apps	Goals	Apps	Goals
Rostov	2012–13	Russian Premier League	0	0	0	0	–		0	0	0	0
Rostov	2013–14	Russian Premier League	2	0	1	0	–		–		3	0
Rostov	Total		2	0	1	0	0	0	0	0	3	0
Vityaz Podolsk (loan)	2014–15	Russian Second League	20	8	2	0	–		–		22	8
Dynamo St. Petersburg (loan)	2015–16	Russian Second League	17	3	1	0	–		–		18	3
Dynamo St. Petersburg	2016–17	Russian Second League	25	13	2	1	–		5 (Note: Appearances in the FNL Cup)	0	32	14
Dynamo St. Petersburg	2017–18	Russian First League	37	17	3	2	–		–		40	19
Dynamo St. Petersburg	Total		62	30	5	3	0	0	5	0	72	33
Orenburg	2018–19	Russian Premier League	9	1	3	0	–		–		12	1
Orenburg	2019–20	Russian Premier League	18	3	1	1	–		–		19	4
Orenburg	2020–21	Russian First League	8	2	1	0	–		–		9	2
Orenburg	Total		35	6	5	1	0	0	0	0	40	7
Chayka	2020–21	Russian First League	26	5	–		–		–		26	5
Fakel Voronezh	2021–22	Russian First League	21	1	3	1	–		–		24	2
Kuban Krasnodar	2021–22	Russian First League	9	0	1	0	–		–		10	0
Shinnik Yaroslavl	2022–23	Russian First League	34	5	1	0	–		–		35	5
Khimki	2023–24	Russian First League	14	0	2	0	–		–		16	0
Career total			240	58	21	5	0	0	5	0	266	63
