= Danil Lipovoy =

Russian footballer

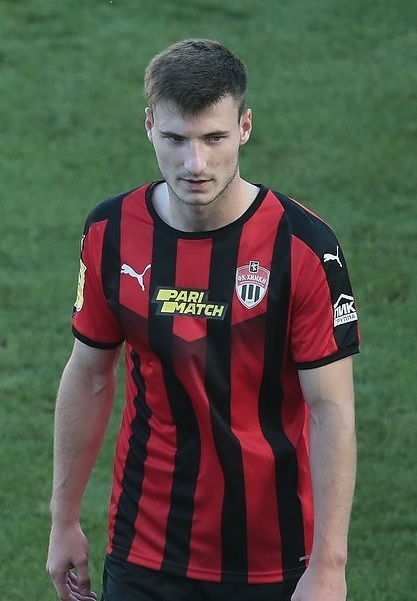
- Lipovoy with FC Khimki in 2020

Personal information
- Full name: Danil Nikolayevich Lipovoy
- Date of birth: 22 September 1999 (age 27)
- Place of birth: Kirov, Russia
- Height: 1.77 m (5 ft 10 in)
- Position: Right midfielder

Team information
- Current team: Ufa
- Number: 9

Youth career
- 2015: Krylia Sovetov Samara
- 2017–2019: Dynamo Moscow
- 2019: Orenburg

Senior career*
Years	Team	Apps	(Gls)
2017	Dynamo-2 Moscow	9	(4)
2018–2021	Dynamo Moscow	5	(0)
2019–2020	→ Orenburg (loan)	5	(0)
2020	→ Khimki (loan)	8	(0)
2021–2024	Krylia Sovetov Samara	19	(0)
2023	→ Volgar Astrakhan (loan)	14	(3)
2023–2024	→ Neftekhimik Nizhnekamsk (loan)	17	(2)
2024–2026	Arsenal Tula	49	(2)
2026–	Ufa	10	(0)

International career^{‡}
2017	Russia U18	4	(0)
2017	Russia U19	1	(0)
2018–2019	Russia U20	10	(0)
- * Club domestic league appearances and goals as of 16 May 2026 ‡ National team caps and goals as of 11 June 2019

Danil Nikolayevich Lipovoy (Russian: Дани́л Никола́евич Липово́й; born 22 September 1999) is a Russian football player who plays for Ufa. He plays as a wide midfielder, usually on the right.

== Club career ==
He made his debut in the Russian Professional Football League for Dynamo-2 Moscow on 2 April 2017 in a game against Dynamo Saint Petersburg.

He made his debut for the main squad of Dynamo Moscow on 26 September 2018 in a Russian Cup game against Torpedo Moscow. He made Russian Premier League debut for Dynamo on 30 November 2018 in a game against Rubin Kazan, as a 64th-minute substitute for Miguel Cardoso.

On 23 August 2019, he joined Orenburg on loan.

On 11 August 2020, he was loaned to Khimki for the 2020–21 season. On 24 December 2020, his loan was terminated early and he returned to Dynamo.

On 23 June 2021, he signed a 3-year contract with Krylia Sovetov Samara. On 25 January 2023, Lipovoy moved on loan to Volgar Astrakhan.

== Career statistics ==
As of 27 November 2022

Club	Season	League			Cup		Continental		Total	
Club	Season	Division	Apps	Goals	Apps	Goals	Apps	Goals	Apps	Goals
Dynamo-2 Moscow	2016–17	PFL	9	4	–		–		9	4
Dynamo Moscow	2018–19	RPL	3	0	2	0	–		5	0
Orenburg	2019–20	RPL	5	0	1	0	–		6	0
Khimki	2020–21	RPL	8	0	2	0	–		10	0
Dynamo Moscow	2020–21	RPL	2	0	1	0	–		3	0
Dynamo Moscow	Total		5	0	3	0	0	0	8	0
Krylia Sovetov Samara	2021–22	RPL	14	0	2	1	–		16	1
Krylia Sovetov Samara	2022–23	RPL	5	0	2	0	–		7	0
Krylia Sovetov Samara	Total		19	0	4	1	0	0	23	1
Career total			46	4	10	1	0	0	56	5
