= David Bidlovsky =

Russian footballer

Personal information
- Full name: David Vasilyevich Bidlovsky
- Date of birth: 22 January 1999 (age 27)
- Place of birth: Sumy, Ukraine
- Height: 1.75 m (5 ft 9 in)
- Position: Midfielder

Youth career
- Dynamo Moscow

Senior career*
| Years | Team | Apps | (Gls) |
| 2017–2018 | FC Afips-2 Afipsky | | |
| 2018–2021 | Orenburg | 15 | (0) |
| 2020 | → Urozhay (loan) | 1 | (0) |
| 2020–2021 | → Orenburg-2 | 10 | (1) |
| 2021 | → Akron Tolyatti (loan) | 1 | (0) |
| 2022–2023 | Forte Taganrog | 18 | (1) |
- * Club domestic league appearances and goals as of 25 September 2022

David Vasilyevich Bidlovsky (Russian: Давид Васильевич Бидловский; born 22 January 1999) is a Russian football player.

== Club career ==
He made his debut in the Russian Premier League for FC Orenburg on 5 July 2020 in a game against FC Rubin Kazan, replacing Adi Gotlieb in the 65th minute.
