= Filip Rogić =

Swedish footballer

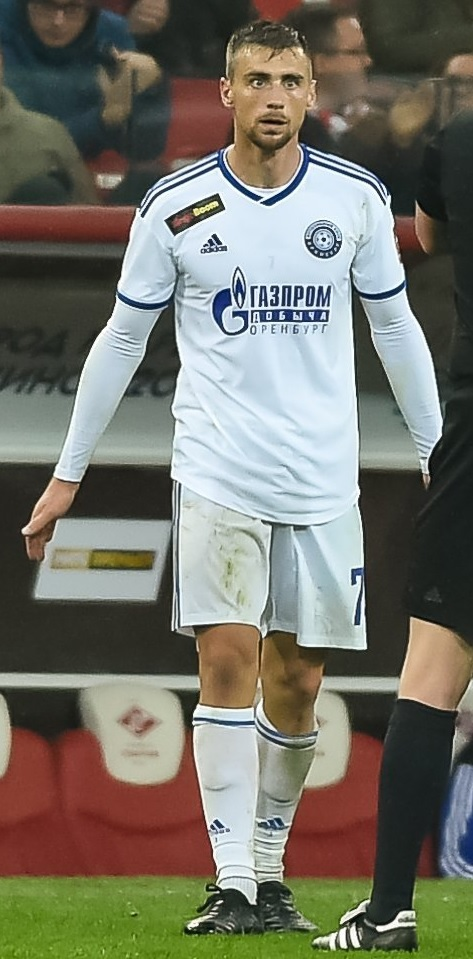
- Rogić with FC Orenburg in 2019

Personal information
- Full name: Filip Roberto Rogić
- Date of birth: 14 June 1993 (age 33)
- Place of birth: Eskilstuna, Sweden
- Height: 1.81 m (5 ft 11 1/2 in)
- Positions: Defensive midfielder; left back

Team information
- Current team: AFC Eskilstuna
- Number: 68

Youth career
- –2010: Eskilstuna City

Senior career*
Years	Team	Apps	(Gls)
2010–2012	Eskilstuna City	50	(11)
2013–2014	Östersund	9	(0)
2014	→ AFC United (loan)	26	(6)
2015–2016	AFC United	57	(7)
2017–2019	Örebro	73	(21)
2019–2020	Orenburg	11	(1)
2020–2021	AIK	27	(3)
2022	Sirius	27	(1)
2023	Buriram United	8	(0)
2023	HJK	7	(0)
2024	IMT Beograd	2	(0)
2024–2025	Nordic United	51	(2)
2026–	AFC Eskilstuna	12	(0)
- * Club domestic league appearances and goals as of 16 November 2026

Filip Roberto Rogić (born 14 June 1993) is a Swedish professional footballer who plays as a defensive midfielder for AFC Eskilstuna].

== Club career ==
Rogic began his senior career at Eskilstuna City FK, where he played from 2010 to 2012. In January 2013, he signed for Östersunds FK. During the 2014 season, Rogic was loaned to AFC United and later signed for them in February 2015.

In December 2016, Rogic signed for Örebro SK, where he signed a three-year contract. On 25 September 2016, Rogic scored a hat-trick in a 4–3 win against IK Sirius.

On 2 September 2019, he signed with the Russian Premier League club FC Orenburg. On 11 June 2020, his Orenburg contract was terminated by mutual consent.

Rogić signed with Finnish champions HJK on 24 July 2023 for the rest of the 2023 season.

In early March 2024 he joined Serbian club IMT Beograd. However 15 days later, on 19 March 2024, Rogić joined swedish side Nordic United, due to personal reasons.

== Personal life ==
Filip Rogic is married to Felicia Rogic (born 1993), a footballer who previously played for Eskilstuna United.

== Career statistics ==
As of 23 October 2024.

Appearances and goals by club, season and competition
Club	Season	League			Cup (Note: Includes Svenska Cupen, Russian Football Cup and Thai FA Cup)		Europe		Total	
Club	Season	Division	Apps	Goals	Apps	Goals	Apps	Goals	Apps	Goals
Eskilstuna City	2010	Swedish Division 2	3	0	–		–		3	0
Eskilstuna City	2011	Swedish Division 2	21	5	–		–		21	5
Eskilstuna City	2012	Swedish Division 1	26	6	–		–		26	6
Eskilstuna City	Total		50	11	0	0	0	0	50	11
Östersund	2013	Superettan	9	0	1	2	–		10	2
AFC United (loan)	2014	Swedish Division 1	26	6	5	2	–		31	8
AFC United	2015	Superettan	29	3	3	0	–		32	3
AFC United	2016	Superettan	28	4	1	0	–		29	4
AFC United	Total		57	7	4	0	0	0	61	7
Örebro	2017	Allsvenskan	25	6	4	0	–		29	6
Örebro	2018	Allsvenskan	28	7	4	2	–		32	9
Örebro	2019	Allsvenskan	20	8	3	0	–		23	8
Örebro	Total		73	21	11	2	0	0	84	23
Orenburg	2019–20	Russian Premier League	11	1	1	0	–		12	1
AIK	2020	Allsvenskan	11	1	2	1	–		13	2
AIK	2021	Allsvenskan	16	2	0	0	–		16	2
AIK	Total		27	3	2	1	0	0	29	4
Sirius	2022	Allsvenskan	27	1	4	0	–		31	1
Buriram United	2022–23	Thai League 1	8	0	2	0	–		10	0
HJK Helsinki	2023	Veikkausliiga	7	0	–		4 (Note: Appearances in UEFA Champions League, UEFA Europa League and UEFA Conference League)	0	11	0
IMT Beograd	2023–24	Serbian SuperLiga	2	0	–		–		2	0
Nordic United	2024	Ettan	29	2	–		–		29	2
Career total			326	52	30	7	4	0	360	59

== Honours ==
Buriram United

- Thai League 1: 2022–23

HJK

- Veikkausliiga: 2023
