= Joel Fameyeh =

Ghanaian professional footballer

Personal information
- Date of birth: 14 May 1997 (age 29)
- Place of birth: Kumasi, Ghana
- Height: 1.80 m (5 ft 11 in)
- Position: Striker

Team information
- Current team: Puskás Akadémia
- Number: 7

Youth career
- Asokwa Deportivo

Senior career*
Years	Team	Apps	(Gls)
2015	Asokwa Deportivo	30	(28)
2016–2019	Wa All Stars	0	(0)
2016	→ Belshina Bobruisk (loan)	12	(5)
2016–2019	→ Dinamo Brest (loan)	76	(22)
2019–2022	Orenburg	84	(34)
2022–2025	Rubin Kazan	48	(15)
2024	→ Baltika Kaliningrad (loan)	3	(1)
2025–	Puskás Akadémia	33	(4)

International career^{‡}
2015–	Ghana	6	(2)
- * Club domestic league appearances and goals as of 17 May 2026 ‡ National team caps and goals as of 22:40, 10 December 2022 (UTC)

Joel Fameyeh (born 14 May 1997) is a Ghanaian professional footballer who plays as a striker for Hungarian club Puskás Akadémia.

== Club career ==
From 2016 till 2019 Fameyeh played in Belarus for Belshina Bobruisk and Dinamo Brest on loan from Ghanaian Wa All Stars.

On 12 July 2019, he signed with Russian Premier League club FC Orenburg. On 10 August 2019, with Orenburg down 0–2 to FC Tambov at home in a league game, Fameyeh came on as a substitute in the 70th minute and scored twice in the next 8 minutes to establish the game's final score of 2–2.

On 2 June 2022, Fameyeh signed a three-year contract with FC Rubin Kazan.

On 8 February 2024, Fameyeh moved on loan to Baltika Kaliningrad.

On 31 January 2025, Fameyeh signed a two-and-a-half-year contract with Puskás Akadémia in Hungary.

== Career statistics ==
=== Club ===
As of match played 30 November 2024

Appearances and goals by club, season and competition
Club	Season	League			National Cup		Europe		Other		Total	
Club	Season	Division	Apps	Goals	Apps	Goals	Apps	Goals	Apps	Goals	Apps	Goals
Belshina Bobruisk	2015	Belarusian Premier League	0	0	2	1	—		—		2	1
Belshina Bobruisk	2016	Belarusian Premier League	12	5	1	0	—		—		13	5
Belshina Bobruisk	Total		12	5	3	1	—		—		16	1
Dynamo Brest	2016	Belarusian Premier League	15	5	6	2	—		—		21	7
Dynamo Brest	2017	Belarusian Premier League	27	5	7	8	2 (Note: Appearances in the UEFA Europa League)	0	0	0	36	13
Dynamo Brest	2018	Belarusian Premier League	24	7	0	0	3	0	1 (Note: Appearance in Belarusian Super Cup)	0	28	7
Dynamo Brest	2019	Belarusian Premier League	10	5	0	0	0	0	0	0	10	5
Dynamo Brest	Total		76	22	13	10	5	0	1	0	95	32
Orenburg	2019–20	Russian Premier League	23	7	2	1	—		—		25	8
Orenburg	2020–21	Russian First League	35	12	1	1	—		—		36	13
Orenburg	2021–22	Russian First League	26	15	1	0	—		—		27	15
Orenburg	Total		84	34	4	2	—		—		88	36
Rubin Kazan	2022–23	Russian First League	30	11	0	0	—		—		30	11
Rubin Kazan	2023–24	Russian Premier League	15	3	5	0	—		—		20	3
Rubin Kazan	2024–25	Russian Premier League	3	1	3	0	—		—		6	1
Rubin Kazan	Total		48	15	8	0	—		—		56	15
Baltika Kaliningrad (loan)	2023–24	Russian Premier League	3	1	1	0	—		—		4	1
Puskás Akadémia	2025	Nemzeti Bajnokság I	1	0	0	0	—		—		1	0
Career total			224	77	29	13	5	0	1	0	259	90

=== International ===
As of match played 6 September 2021

Appearances and goals by national team and year
National team	Year	Apps	Goals
Ghana	2015	2	2
Ghana	2021	4	0
Total		6	2

Scores and results list Ghana's goal tally first.

No	Date	Venue	Opponent	Score	Result	Competition
1.	18 October 2015	Baba Yara Stadium, Kumasi, Ghana	Ivory Coast	1–1	2–1	2016 African Nations Championship qualification
2.	18 October 2015	Baba Yara Stadium, Kumasi, Ghana	Ivory Coast	2–1	2–1	2016 African Nations Championship qualification

== Honours ==
Dynamo Brest

- Belarusian Cup: 2017, 2018
- Belarusian Super Cup: 2018, 2019

Orenburg

- Russian First Division Promotion: 2021–22

Rubin Kazan

- Russian First League: 2022–23
