= Aleksei Kenyaykin =

Russian footballer

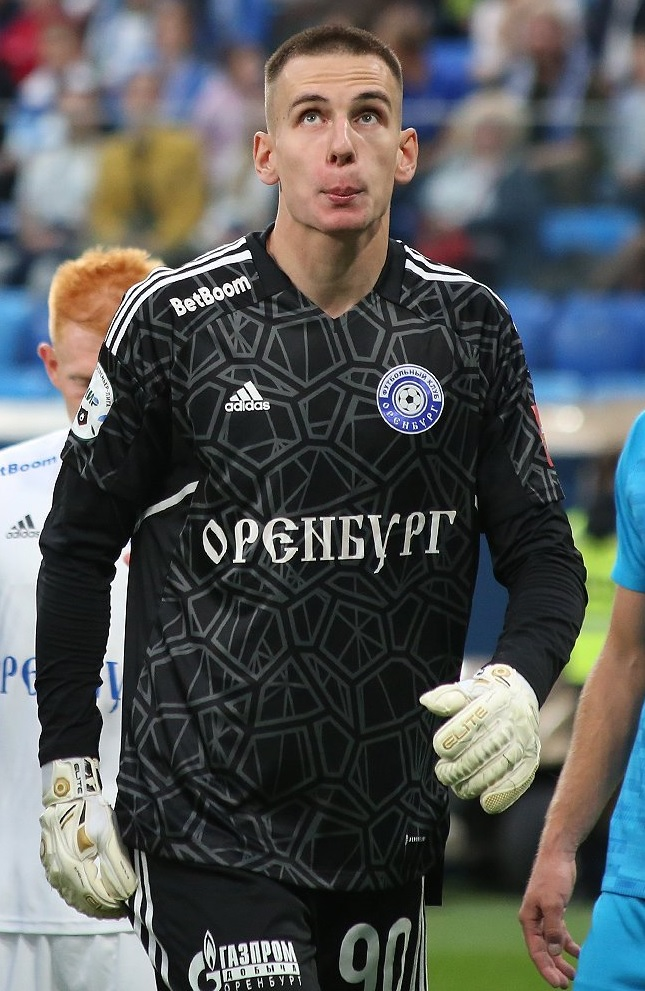
- Kenyaykin with Orenburg in 2022

Personal information
- Full name: Aleksei Nikolayevich Kenyaykin
- Date of birth: 23 August 1998 (age 28)
- Place of birth: Samara, Russia
- Height: 1.97 m (6 ft 6 in)
- Position: Goalkeeper

Team information
- Current team: Turan Tovuz

Youth career
- 2009–2014: SDYuSShOR №1 Samara
- 2014–2016: Krylia Sovetov Samara
- 2016–2017: Orenburg

Senior career*
Years	Team	Apps	(Gls)
2017–2025	Orenburg	43	(0)
2017–2018	→ Orenburg-2	5	(0)
2019–2020	→ Torpedo Moscow (loan)	20	(0)
2024–2025	→ Orenburg-2	3	(0)
2025–2026	Volga Ulyanovsk	29	(0)
2026	Rubin Kazan	0	(0)
2026–	Turan Tovuz	0	(0)
- * Club domestic league appearances and goals as of 29 November 2025

Aleksei Nikolayevich Kenyaykin (Russian: Алексей Николаевич Кеняйкин; born 23 August 1998) is a Russian football player who plays as a goalkeeper for Azerbaijani club Turan Tovuz.

== Club career ==
Kenyaykin made his debut in the Russian Professional Football League for Orenburg-2 on 18 August 2017 in a game against Anzhi-Yunior Zelenodolsk.

On 4 July 2019, he joined Torpedo Moscow on loan for the 2019–20 season. He made his Russian Football National League debut for Torpedo on 28 July 2019 in a game against Nizhny Novgorod.

Kenyaykin made his Russian Premier League debut for Orenburg on 3 September 2022 against Khimki.

On 17 January 2025, Kenyaykin moved to Volga Ulyanovsk.

On 18 February 2026, Kenyaykin signed a two-and-a-half-season contract with Rubin Kazan. He left Rubin by mutual consent on 16 June 2026.

On 4 July 2026, Kenyaykin signed a two-year contract with Turan Tovuz in Azerbaijan.

== Career statistics ==
As of 29 November 2025

Club	Season	League			Cup		Total	
Club	Season	Division	Apps	Goals	Apps	Goals	Apps	Goals
Orenburg-2	2017–18	Russian Second League	5	0	–		5	0
Orenburg-2	2024	Russian Second League B	3	0	–		3	0
Orenburg-2	Total		8	0	0	0	8	0
Orenburg	2017–18	Russian First League	0	0	0	0	0	0
Orenburg	2018–19	Russian Premier League	0	0	0	0	0	0
Orenburg	2020–21	Russian First League	7	0	1	0	8	0
Orenburg	2021–22	Russian First League	22	0	0	0	22	0
Orenburg	2022–23	Russian Premier League	11	0	1	0	12	0
Orenburg	2023–24	Russian Premier League	3	0	5	0	8	0
Orenburg	2024–25	Russian Premier League	0	0	0	0	0	0
Orenburg	Total		43	0	7	0	50	0
Torpedo Moscow (loan)	2019–20	Russian First League	20	0	2	0	22	0
Volga Ulyanovsk	2024–25	Russian Second League A	17	0	–		17	0
Volga Ulyanovsk	2025–26	Russian First League	12	0	1	0	13	0
Volga Ulyanovsk	Total		29	0	1	0	30	0
Rubin Kazan	2025–26	Russian Premier League	0	0	–		0	0
Career total			100	0	10	0	110	0
