= Konstantin Paramonov =

Russian footballer

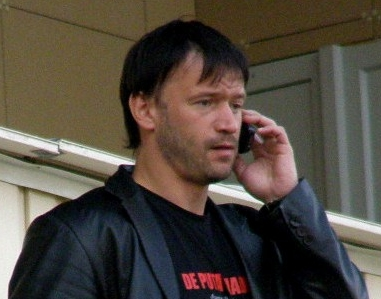
- Konstantin Paramonov in April 2008

Personal information
- Full name: Konstantin Valentinovich Paramonov
- Date of birth: 26 November 1973 (age 52)
- Place of birth: Perm, USSR
- Height: 1.81 m (5 ft 11 in)
- Position: Forward

Senior career*
Years	Team	Apps	(Gls)
1991–1995	FC Zvezda Perm	135	(16)
1996–2008	FC Amkar Perm	337	(171)
Total		472	(187)

Managerial career
- 2009–2014: FC Amkar Perm (reserves assistant)
- 2014: FC Amkar Perm (caretaker)
- 2014–2017: FC Amkar Perm (reserves)
- 2017–2018: FC Amkar Perm (academy)
- 2018–2019: FC Zvezda Perm
- 2019–2020: FC Orenburg (assistant)
- 2020: FC Orenburg
- 2020–2021: FC Lada Dimitrovgrad
- 2021: FC Zvezda Perm
- 2022–2023: FC Kolomna
- * Club domestic league appearances and goals

Konstantin Valentinovich Paramonov (Russian: Константин Валентинович Парамонов; born 26 November 1973) is a Russian football coach and a former player.

== Playing career ==
He scored the most league goals in Amkar's history (171). He was the top scorer in Russian First Division in 1999 (23 goals) and the top scorer in Russian Second Division in 1996 (34 goals, Zone Center) and 1998 (30 goals, Zone Ural).

== Coaching career ==
On 22 May 2020, Ilshat Aitkulov was appointed caretaker manager of FC Orenburg. As Aitkulov does not possess the mandatory UEFA Pro Licence, Paramonov was officially registered with the league as manager. He left Orenburg on 24 July 2020, following the club's relegation from the Russian Premier League.

== Personal life ==
His son Yevgeni Paramonov is a professional footballer.
