= 2019 Russian Cup final =

- Event: 2018–19 Russian Cup
Lokomotiv Moscow	Ural Yekaterinburg
1	0
- Date: 22 May 2019
- Venue: Samara Arena, Samara
- Referee: Sergey Lapochkin (Saint Petersburg)
- Attendance: 38,018

The 2019 Russian Cup final was the 27th Russian Cup Final, the final match of the 2018–19 Russian Cup. It was played at Samara Arena in Samara, Russia, on 22 May 2019, contested by Lokomotiv Moscow and Ural Yekaterinburg. Lokomotiv Moscow won the match 1–0, with the only goal coming from Dmitri Barinov in the 27th minute. Since Lokomotiv Moscow had already qualified for the 2019–20 UEFA Champions League, Arsenal Tula will enter the 2019–20 UEFA Europa League in the second qualifying round.

== Route to the final ==
=== Lokomotiv Moscow ===
Round	Opposition	Score
Round of 16	Yenisey Krasnoyarsk (H)	4–1
QF 1st leg	Rubin Kazan (H)	1–0
QF 2nd leg	Rubin Kazan (A)	1–0 aggregate (2–0)
SF 1st leg	Rostov (H)	2–2
SF 2nd leg	Rostov (A)	2–0 aggregate (4–0)
Key: (H) = Home venue; (A) = Away venue; (N) = Neutral venue.

=== Ural Yekaterinburg ===
Round	Opposition	Score
Round of 16	Nizhny Novgorod (H)	2–1
QF 1st leg	Spartak Moscow (A)	1–1
QF 2nd leg	Spartak Moscow (H)	1–0 aggregate (2–1)
SF 1st leg	Arsenal Tula (H)	1–0
SF 2nd leg	Arsenal Tula (A)	2–2 aggregate (3–2)
Key: (H) = Home venue; (A) = Away venue; (N) = Neutral venue.

== Match ==
=== Details ===
22 May 2019
19:30 SAMT

Lokomotiv Moscow	1–0	Ural Yekaterinburg
Barinov 27'	Report

Samara Arena, Samara
Attendance: 38,018
Referee: Sergey Lapochkin (Saint Petersburg)

Lokomotiv Moscow	Ural

GK	1	(Russia) Guilherme	(yellow card) 90'
DF	3	(Nigeria) Brian Idowu
DF	14	(Croatia) Vedran Ćorluka (c)
DF	84	(Russia) Mikhail Lysov
MF	4	(Portugal) Manuel Fernandes
MF	6	(Russia) Dmitri Barinov	27' (yellow card) 40'
MF	7	(Poland) Grzegorz Krychowiak
MF	11	(Russia) Anton Miranchuk		(substituted off) 67'
MF	59	(Russia) Aleksei Miranchuk
FW	9	(Russia) Fyodor Smolov		(substituted off) 90'
FW	74	(Russia) Rifat Zhemaletdinov
Substitutes:
GK	30	(Russia) Nikita Medvedev
GK	77	(Russia) Anton Kochenkov
DF	17	(Ukraine) Taras Mykhalyk
DF	36	(Russia) Innokenti Samokhvalov
DF	37	(Russia) Stanislav Magkeyev
DF	42	(Russia) Ivan Lapshov
MF	18	(Russia) Aleksandr Kolomeytsev
MF	21	(Georgia (country)) Khvicha Kvaratskhelia		(substituted in) 90'
MF	23	(Russia) Dmitri Tarasov		(substituted in) 67'
FW	67	(Russia) Roman Tugarev
MF	69	(Russia) Daniil Kulikov
FW	24	(Portugal) Eder
Manager:
(Russia) Yuri Semin

GK	31	(Russia) Yaroslav Hodzyur
DF	27	(Russia) Mikhail Merkulov	(yellow card) 83'
DF	15	(Ukraine) Denys Kulakov
DF	8	(Norway) Stefan Strandberg
MF	57	(Russia) Artyom Fidler (c)		(substituted off) 84'
MF	92	(Russia) Roman Yemelyanov	(yellow card) 87'
MF	13	(Cameroon) Petrus Boumal
MF	58	(Netherlands) Othman El Kabir
FW	88	(Russia) Pavel Pogrebnyak	(yellow card) 59'
FW	20	(Russia) Andrei Panyukov		(substituted off) 56'
FW	11	(Russia) Vladimir Ilyin
Substitutes:
GK	77	(Russia) Oleg Baklov
DF	7	(Russia) Aleksandr Dantsev
DF	4	(Russia) Sergei Bryzgalov
DF	5	(Serbia) Dominik Dinga
MF	3	(Armenia) Varazdat Haroyan
MF	14	(Russia) Yuri Bavin		(substituted in) 84'
MF	19	(Belarus) Dzyanis Palyakow
MF	21	(Switzerland) Marco Aratore		(substituted in) 56'
MF	70	(Russia) Ilya Zhigulyov
MF	94	(Russia) Anatoli Katrich
Manager:
(Russia) Dmytro Parfenov

Man of the Match:

Assistant referees:
Alexey Stipidi (Krasnodar)
Adlan Khatuyev (Grozny)
Fourth official:
Vitali Meshkov (Dimitrov)

Match rules

- 90 minutes
- 30 minutes of extra time if necessary
- Penalty shoot-out if scores still level
- twelve named substitutes
- Maximum of three substitutions, with a fourth allowed in extra time
