= Yegor Kondakov =

Russian footballer

Personal information
- Full name: Yegor Nikolayevich Kondakov
- Date of birth: 26 November 1998 (age 27)
- Height: 1.66 m (5 ft 5 in)
- Position: Defender

Senior career*
Years	Team	Apps	(Gls)
2015–2022	FC Chertanovo Moscow	109	(3)
2018–2019	FC Chertanovo-2 Moscow	7	(0)

International career
2016	Russia U-18	6	(0)
- * Club domestic league appearances and goals

Yegor Nikolayevich Kondakov (Russian: Егор Николаевич Кондаков; born 26 November 1998) is a Russian former football player.

== Club career ==
He made his debut in the Russian Professional Football League for FC Chertanovo Moscow on 6 May 2015 in a game against FC Lokomotiv Liski. He made his Russian Football National League debut for Chertanovo on 25 May 2019 in a game against FC Rotor Volgograd.
