= Konstantin Yemelyanov =

Russian footballer

Personal information
- Full name: Konstantin Vladilenovich Yemelyanov
- Date of birth: 28 March 1970 (age 56)
- Place of birth: Vladivostok, Russian SFSR
- Height: 1.85 m (6 ft 1 in)
- Position: Defender

Senior career*
Years	Team	Apps	(Gls)
1988	FC Luch Vladivostok	23	(1)
1989	FC SKA Khabarovsk	10	(0)
1990–1996	FC Luch Vladivostok	220	(10)
1997–1998	FC Irtysh Omsk	76	(0)
1999–2001	FC Gazovik-Gazprom Izhevsk	60	(0)
2001–2002	FC Irtysh Omsk	20	(0)

Managerial career
- 2005–2006: FC Luch-Energiya Vladivostok (assistant)
- 2007–2008: FC Luch-Energiya Vladivostok (reserves assistant)
- 2009–2012: FC Luch-Energiya Vladivostok (assistant)
- 2009: FC Luch-Energiya Vladivostok (caretaker)
- 2012–2013: FC Luch-Energiya Vladivostok
- 2013–2017: FC Luch-Energiya Vladivostok (assistant)
- 2017: FC Luch-Energiya Vladivostok
- 2017–2019: FC Orenburg (assistant)
- 2019–2020: FC Orenburg
- 2021–2022: FC Shakhter Karagandy (assistant)
- 2022: FC Shakhter Karagandy (caretaker)
- 2023–2024: FC Dynamo Vladivostok (assistant)
- 2024: FC Shakhter Karagandy (caretaker)
- 2025: FC KDV Tomsk
- * Club domestic league appearances and goals

Konstantin Vladilenovich Yemelyanov (Russian: Константин Владиленович Емельянов; born 28 March 1970) is a Russian professional football coach and a former player.

== Coaching career ==
On 8 December 2019, he was appointed manager of Russian Premier League club FC Orenburg after working there as an assistant for the two previous seasons. On 22 May 2020, Orenburg announced that Yemelyanov's contract expired and will not be extended.
