= Ivan Lapshov =

Russian footballer

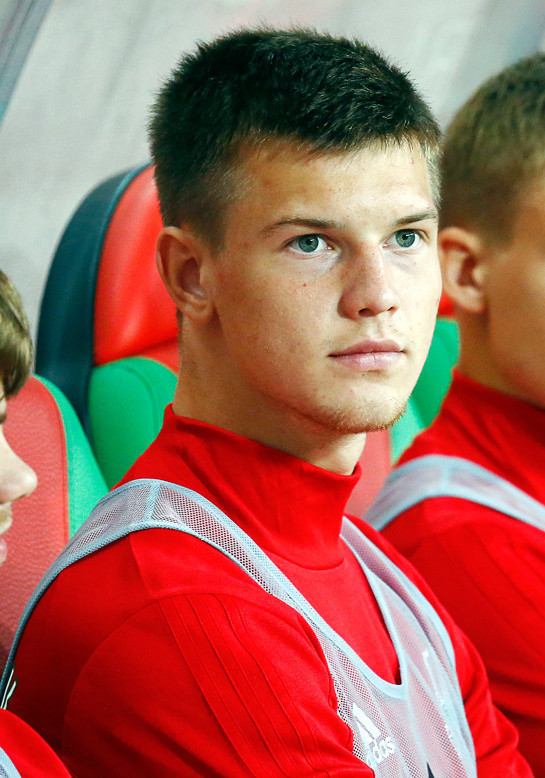
- Lapshov with Lokomotiv in 2017

Personal information
- Full name: Ivan Aleksandrovich Lapshov
- Date of birth: 1 May 1999 (age 27)
- Place of birth: Moscow, Russia
- Height: 1.88 m (6 ft 2 in)
- Position: Defender

Youth career
- –2011: Megasfera-Obruchevsky Moscow
- 2011–2015: Chertanovo Education Center
- 2015–2017: FC Lokomotiv Moscow

Senior career*
Years	Team	Apps	(Gls)
2016–2019	FC Lokomotiv Moscow	1	(0)
2018–2019	→ FC Kazanka Moscow	26	(0)
2019–2022	FC Orenburg	1	(0)
2020–2021	→ FC Tom Tomsk (loan)	23	(1)
2021–2022	→ FC Yenisey Krasnoyarsk (loan)	22	(1)
2021–2022	→ FC Yenisey-2 Krasnoyarsk (loan)	2	(0)
2023	FC Orenburg-2	0	(0)
2023	FC Irtysh Omsk	15	(1)
2024	FC Metallurg Lipetsk	20	(3)
2025	FC KDV Tomsk	5	(0)

International career^{‡}
2014	Russia U-15	1	(0)
2015	Russia U-16	2	(0)
2016–2017	Russia U-18	9	(0)
2016–2017	Russia U-19	9	(0)
2017	Russia U-20	1	(0)
2019	Russia U-21	2	(0)
- * Club domestic league appearances and goals as of 19 October 2025 ‡ National team caps and goals as of 5 June 2019

Ivan Aleksandrovich Lapshov (Russian: Иван Александрович Лапшов; born 1 May 1999) is a Russian football player.

== Club career ==
He made his debut in the Russian Professional Football League for FC Kazanka Moscow on 30 March 2018 in a game against FC Chertanovo Moscow.

He made his Russian Premier League debut for FC Lokomotiv Moscow on 10 May 2019 in a game against FC Rubin Kazan.

On 2 September 2019, he signed with FC Orenburg. On 1 October 2020, he was loaned to FC Tom Tomsk.
