= Edi Gotlieb =

Israeli association footballer, who holds a Russian passport

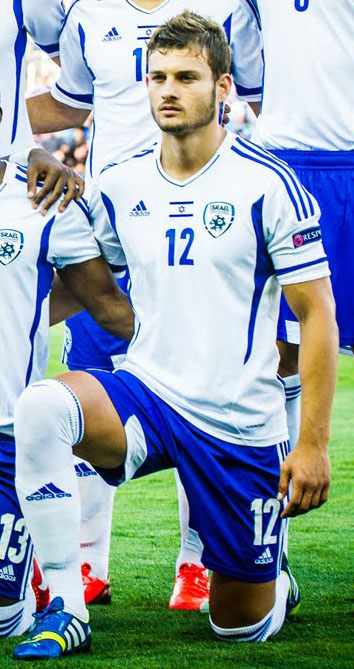
- Gotlieb with Israel U-21 in 2013

Personal information
- Full name: Eduard Eduardovich Gotlib
- Date of birth: 16 August 1992 (age 34)
- Place of birth: Karmi'el, Israel
- Height: 1.87 m (6 ft 1 1/2 in)
- Position: Centre-back

Senior career*
Years	Team	Apps	(Gls)
2011–2015	Hapoel Acre	116	(3)
2015–2019	Hapoel Tel Aviv	94	(10)
2019–2020	Orenburg	5	(0)
2020–2023	Hapoel Tel Aviv	68	(2)
2023–2024	Beitar Jerusalem	15	(1)

International career
2011–2013	Israel U21	6	(0)
- * Club domestic league appearances and goals

Edi Gotlieb (or Gotliv, Hebrew: אדי גוטליב; born 16 August 1992) is an Israeli former professional footballer who played as a centre-back.

== Early and personal life ==
Gotlieb was born in Karmi'el, Israel.

He also holds a Russian passport as Eduard Eduardovich Gotlib (Russian: Эдуард Эдуардович Готлиб), and was registered with the Russian Premier League as a local player.

In May 2021, he married Israeli cosmetician Natali (née Levi).

== Club career ==
On 5 August 2019, he signed with Russian Premier League club FC Orenburg. His Orenburg contract was terminated by mutual consent on 3 August 2020.

== International career ==
He has been an Israel under-21 international since between 2011 and 2013.

He was called up for the senior Israel national team in October 2021, during their 2022 FIFA World Cup qualifiers - UEFA.
