= Ilshat Aitkulov =

Russian footballer (born 1969)

Personal information
- Full name: Ilshat Nurgaliyevich Aitkulov
- Date of birth: 15 February 1969 (age 57)
- Place of birth: Zobovo, Russian SFSR
- Height: 1.77 m (5 ft 9 1/2 in)
- Position: Midfielder

Senior career*
Years	Team	Apps	(Gls)
1990–2003	FC Gazovik Orenburg	396	(40)

Managerial career
- 2003–2005: FC Gazovik Orenburg (assistant)
- 2004: FC Gazovik Orenburg (caretaker)
- 2005: FC Orenburg
- 2005–2026: FC Gazovik Orenburg (assistant)
- 2006: FC Gazovik Orenburg (caretaker)
- 2009: FC Gazovik Orenburg (caretaker)
- 2011: FC Gazovik Orenburg (caretaker)
- 2020: FC Orenburg (caretaker)
- 2024: FC Orenburg (caretaker)
- * Club domestic league appearances and goals

Ilshat Nurgaliyevich Aitkulov (Bashkir: Ильшат Нурғәли улы Айытҡолов, romanized: İlşat Nurğäli ulı Ayıtqolov; Russian: Ильшат Нургалиевич Айткулов; born 15 February 1969) is a Russian professional football coach and a former player. He devoted his whole career to FC Orenburg.

== Club career ==
On 22 May 2020, he was appointed caretaker manager of FC Orenburg. As he does not possess the mandatory UEFA Pro Licence, Konstantin Paramonov was officially registered with the league as manager.

On 3 October 2024, Aitkulov was appointed caretaker manager of Orenburg once again, following the firing of David Deogracia.
