= 2020–21 Russian Football National League =

Football season

Russian Football National League
- Season: 2020–21
- Dates: 1 August 2020 - 15 May 2021
- Champions: Krylia Sovetov
- Promoted: Krylia Sovetov; Nizhny Novgorod
- Relegated: Chayka Peschanokopskoye; Irtysh Omsk; Dynamo Bryansk; Chertanovo Moscow; Shinnik Yaroslavl
- Matches: 462
- Goals: 1,132 (2.45 per match)
- Top goalscorer: Ivan Sergeyev (40 goals)
- Biggest home win: Krylia Sovetov 7–0 Dynamo Bryansk (23 September 2020); Krasnodar-2 7–0 Spartak-2 (5 December 2020)
- Biggest away win: Irtysh 0–5 Spartak-2 (22 August 2020); Veles 0–5 Torpedo (30 August 2020)
- Highest scoring: Alania 4–4 Shinnik (17 October 2020); Fakel 6–2 Krasnodar-2 (15 November 2020); Spartak-2 3–5 Fakel (28 April 2021)
- Longest winning run: 11 matches Krylia Sovetov (5 December 2020 - 17 April 2021)
- Longest unbeaten run: 18 matches Nizhny Novgorod (9 September 2020 - 28 November 2020)
- Longest winless run: 18 matches Shinnik (25 November 2020 - 8 May 2021)
- Longest losing run: 7 matches Chertanovo (16 August 2020 - 19 September 2020); Shinnik (25 November 2020 - 13 March 2021); Irtysh (11 April 2021 - 15 May 2021)
- All statistics correct as of 15 May 2021.

The 2020–21 Russian Football National League was the 29th season of Russia's second-tier football league since the dissolution of the Soviet Union. The season began on August 1, 2020, and end on 15 May 2021.

== Stadia by capacity ==
| Club | City | Stadium | Capacity |
|---|---|---|---|
| Akron | Tolyatti | Kristall Stadium, Zhigulyovsk | 1,565 |
| Alania | Vladikavkaz | Republican Spartak Stadium | 32,464 |
| Baltika | Kaliningrad | Arena Baltika | 35,212 |
| Chayka | Peschanokopskoye | Chayka Central Stadium | 3,000 |
| Chertanovo | Moscow | Sports Village, Luzhniki Olympic Complex | 1,872 |
| Dynamo Bryansk | Bryansk | Dynamo Stadium | 10,100 |
| Fakel | Voronezh | Tsentralnyi Profsoyuz | 31,793 |
| Irtysh Omsk | Omsk | Red Star Stadium | 18,000 |
| Krasnodar-2 | Krasnodar | Krasnodar Academy | 3,500 |
| Krylia Sovetov Samara | Samara | Samara Arena | 44,918 |
| Neftekhimik | Nizhnekamsk | Neftekhimik Stadium | 3,100 |
| Nizhny Novgorod | Nizhny Novgorod | Nizhny Novgorod | 44,899 |
| Orenburg | Orenburg | Gazovik Stadium | 7,520 |
| Shinnik | Yaroslavl | Shinnik Stadium | 22,990 |
| SKA | Khabarovsk | Lenin Stadium | 15,200 |
| Spartak-2 | Moscow | Spartak Academy | 3,077 |
| Tekstilshchik | Ivanovo | Tekstilshchik | 9,565 |
| Tom | Tomsk | Trud | 10,028 |
| Torpedo Moscow | Moscow | Sports Village, Luzhniki Olympic Complex | 1,872 |
| Veles Moscow | Moscow | Avangard Stadium, Domodedovo | 5,503 |
| Volgar Astrakhan | Astrakhan | Central Stadium | 21,500 |
| Yenisey | Krasnoyarsk | Central Stadium | 15,000 |

1. Alania plays at Akhmat-Arena, Grozny, capacity 30,000, while their own stadium is under reconstruction
2. Torpedo's own Eduard Streltsov Stadium is under reconstruction

== Team changes ==
=== To FNL ===
Promoted from PFL

- Akron
- Dynamo Bryansk
- Irtysh Omsk
- Veles Moscow
- Volgar Astrakhan
- Alania Vladikavkaz

Relegated from Premier League

- Krylia Sovetov Samara
- Orenburg

=== From FNL ===
Relegated to PFL

- Avangard Kursk

Demoted to lower divisions

- Luch Vladivostok
- Armavir

Unable to pay for licensing

- Mordovia

Promoted to Premier League

- Khimki
- Rotor Volgograd

== Stadia by locations ==
Location of teams in 2020–21 FNL.
Location of Moscow teams.

== League table ==
| Pos | Team | Pld | W | D | L | GF | GA | GD | Pts | Promotion, qualification or relegation |
|---|---|---|---|---|---|---|---|---|---|---|
| 1 | Krylia Sovetov Samara (C, P) | 42 | 32 | 5 | 5 | 100 | 26 | +74 | 101 | Promotion to Russian Premier League |
| 2 | Orenburg | 42 | 28 | 10 | 4 | 78 | 33 | +45 | 94 | Failed Russian Premier League licensing (Note: Orenburg and Alania Vladikavkaz failed to receive a 2021–22 Premier League license due to deficiencies with their stadiums. The promotion play-offs will not be held and Nizhny Novgorod is promoted directly.) |
| 3 | Nizhny Novgorod (P) | 42 | 27 | 7 | 8 | 67 | 28 | +39 | 88 | Promotion to Russian Premier League |
| 4 | Alania Vladikavkaz | 42 | 22 | 11 | 9 | 74 | 40 | +34 | 77 | Failed Russian Premier League licensing |
| 5 | Baltika Kaliningrad | 42 | 22 | 7 | 13 | 49 | 35 | +14 | 73 | |
| 6 | Torpedo Moscow | 42 | 21 | 9 | 12 | 65 | 41 | +24 | 72 | |
| 7 | Neftekhimik Nizhnekamsk | 42 | 20 | 10 | 12 | 64 | 44 | +20 | 70 | |
| 8 | Veles Moscow | 42 | 18 | 12 | 12 | 54 | 46 | +8 | 66 | |
| 9 | Fakel Voronezh | 42 | 17 | 13 | 12 | 57 | 43 | +14 | 64 | |
| 10 | Yenisey Krasnoyarsk | 42 | 19 | 6 | 17 | 52 | 54 | −2 | 63 | |
| 11 | SKA-Khabarovsk | 42 | 17 | 9 | 16 | 52 | 47 | +5 | 60 | |
| 12 | Chayka Peschanokopskoye (Note: On 2 July 2021, Russian Football Union decided to relegate Chayka from FNL back to PFL for the 2021–22 season for fixing games in the 2018–19 season. According to that, Tom Tomsk avoided relegation to the PFL.) (R) | 42 | 15 | 11 | 16 | 44 | 53 | −9 | 56 | Relegation to lower divisions |
| 13 | Volgar Astrakhan | 42 | 14 | 12 | 16 | 47 | 45 | +2 | 54 | |
| 14 | Spartak-2 Moscow | 42 | 14 | 7 | 21 | 53 | 77 | −24 | 49 | Ineligible for promotion |
| 15 | Tekstilshchik Ivanovo | 42 | 12 | 11 | 19 | 32 | 51 | −19 | 47 | |
| 16 | Krasnodar-2 | 42 | 11 | 12 | 19 | 46 | 68 | −22 | 45 | Ineligible for promotion |
| 17 | Akron Tolyatti (Note: On 15 May 2021, FNL confirmed that FC Tambov, which placed last in the Premier League and was expected to be relegated to FNL, did not apply for the FNL license for the 2021–22 season and therefore Akron will not be relegated.) | 42 | 10 | 12 | 20 | 35 | 54 | −19 | 42 | |
| 18 | Tom Tomsk | 42 | 10 | 11 | 21 | 32 | 50 | −18 | 41 | |
| 19 | Irtysh Omsk (R) | 42 | 9 | 8 | 25 | 33 | 61 | −28 | 35 | Relegation to lower divisions |
| 20 | Dynamo Bryansk (R) | 42 | 10 | 5 | 27 | 24 | 66 | −42 | 32 (Note: Dynamo Bryansk deducted 3 points for fielding players who tested positive for COVID-19.) | Relegation to lower divisions |
| 21 | Chertanovo Moscow (R) | 42 | 7 | 6 | 29 | 35 | 80 | −45 | 27 | Relegation to lower divisions |
| 22 | Shinnik Yaroslavl (R) | 42 | 5 | 10 | 27 | 39 | 90 | −51 | 25 | Relegation to lower divisions |

Source: Soccerway
Rules for classification: 1) Points; then in case of a two-way tie: 2) Head-to-head points; 3) Head-to-head matches won; 4) Head-to-head goal difference; 5) Head-to-head goals scored; 6) Head-to-head away goals scored; 7) Matches won; 8) Goal difference; 9) Goals scored; 10) Away goals scored; 11) Drawing lots; in case of a three-or-more-way tie: 2) Matches won; 3) Head-to-head points; 4) Head-to-head matches won; 5) Head-to-head goal difference; 6) Head-to-head goals scored; 7) Head-to-head away goals scored; 8) Goal difference; 9) Goals scored; 10) Away goals scored; 11) Drawing lots.
(C) Champions; (P) Promoted; (R) Relegated

== Results ==
| Home \ Away | AKR | ALA | BAL | CHA | CHE | DYN | FAK | IRT | KRA | KRY | NEF | NIZ | ORE | SHI | SKA | SPA | TEK | TOM | TOR | VEL | VOL | YEN |
|---|---|---|---|---|---|---|---|---|---|---|---|---|---|---|---|---|---|---|---|---|---|---|
| Akron | | 1–2 | 0–2 | 0–2 | 1–0 | 1–1 | 0–2 | 1–1 | 1–0 | 1–2 | 3–4 | 0–0 | 1–1 | 2–1 | 1–1 | 0–0 | 3–1 | 0–0 | 0–1 | 0–1 | 0–3 | 3–0 |
| Alania | 5–1 | | 5–0 | 1–1 | 3–1 | 3–0 | 2–0 | 1–0 | 3–1 | 0–1 | 1–1 | 0–0 | 2–1 | 4–4 | 2–4 | 2–1 | 3–1 | 2–3 | 1–1 | 0–0 | 2–0 | 3–0 |
| Baltika | 1–0 | 2–0 | | 0–1 | 1–2 | 2–0 | 0–0 | 3–2 | 2–0 | 0–1 | 0–1 | 1–2 | 1–2 | 2–0 | 1–0 | 1–0 | 3–1 | 0–1 | 0–0 | 1–2 | 2–0 | 1–0 |
| Chayka | 0–1 | 3–3 | 0–1 | | 1–1 | 1–0 | 2–1 | 2–1 | 2–1 | 0–3 | 1–0 | 1–1 | 0–1 | 5–1 | 2–1 | 0–2 | 1–3 | 1–1 | 1–2 | 0–2 | 2–1 | 0–1 |
| Chertanovo | 0–1 | 0–3 | 1–2 | 1–2 | | 0–1 | 0–3 | 0–1 | 1–0 | 0–1 | 1–0 | 1–3 | 2–3 | 2–2 | 0–4 | 1–2 | 0–1 | 2–0 | 0–0 | 2–4 | 1–1 | 1–2 |
| Dynamo Bryansk | 2–0 | 0–2 | 1–3 | 0–1 | 1–2 | | 0–2 | 0–3 | 2–1 | 0–2 | 0–3 | 1–0 | 0–1 | 2–0 | 2–5 | 0–3 | 1–0 | 1–0 | 0–1 | 1–0 | 0–1 | 0–0 |
| Fakel | 1–0 | 0–0 | 0–1 | 1–1 | 4–1 | 0–0 | | 3–1 | 6–2 | 1–1 | 1–1 | 0–1 | 0–2 | 2–0 | 3–0 | 1–1 | 1–0 | 0–0 | 0–0 | 0–0 | 1–1 | 1–0 |
| Irtysh | 1–0 | 0–2 | 0–1 | 2–2 | 1–2 | 1–0 | 1–0 | | 0–0 | 0–4 | 1–2 | 0–1 | 0–4 | 0–0 | 1–2 | 0–5 | 0–1 | 1–0 | 0–2 | 1–2 | 1–0 | 1–2 |
| Krasnodar-2 | 1–1 | 0–4 | 3–1 | 1–1 | 1–0 | 0–0 | 3–1 | 2–0 | | 1–1 | 1–1 | 2–3 | 1–1 | 1–2 | 4–2 | 7–0 | 0–1 | 2–0 | 0–3 | 2–1 | 1–0 | 0–2 |
| Krylia Sovetov | 3–0 | 2–0 | 0–0 | 2–1 | 5–0 | 7–0 | 5–1 | 3–1 | 6–0 | | 2–0 | 3–0 | 0–1 | 4–1 | 2–0 | 2–1 | 4–0 | 2–0 | 5–1 | 2–1 | 3–0 | 4–0 |
| Neftekhimik | 3–2 | 0–0 | 2–1 | 1–1 | 3–0 | 5–1 | 3–1 | 1–0 | 5–0 | 1–1 | | 0–1 | 1–2 | 1–1 | 3–2 | 0–1 | 4–0 | 2–0 | 2–2 | 2–0 | 1–1 | 2–0 |
| Nizhny Novgorod | 3–0 | 1–1 | 2–1 | 2–0 | 3–2 | 3–0 | 1–2 | 2–0 | 3–0 | 0–1 | 0–1 | | 0–0 | 3–0 | 1–0 | 4–0 | 2–1 | 1–0 | 4–1 | 1–0 | 1–0 | 1–2 |
| Orenburg | 0–0 | 2–0 | 2–2 | 3–0 | 3–1 | 3–2 | 1–2 | 0–0 | 1–0 | 2–1 | 1–0 | 2–1 | | 3–0 | 2–2 | 5–2 | 1–1 | 2–0 | 3–0 | 3–0 | 2–1 | 1–3 |
| Shinnik | 1–3 | 0–1 | 1–3 | 0–0 | 1–1 | 0–1 | 0–2 | 0–3 | 0–0 | 2–2 | 1–2 | 1–3 | 1–4 | | 2–3 | 1–2 | 0–3 | 2–3 | 1–0 | 1–2 | 2–1 | 3–0 |
| SKA-Khabarovsk | 2–0 | 1–2 | 0–0 | 0–0 | 2–0 | 1–0 | 1–0 | 1–1 | 0–0 | 0–1 | 3–2 | 0–1 | 1–0 | 2–1 | | 3–0 | 1–0 | 1–1 | 2–4 | 1–1 | 1–0 | 0–1 |
| Spartak-2 Moscow | 1–0 | 3–3 | 0–2 | 1–2 | 4–3 | 0–0 | 3–5 | 1–2 | 1–2 | 0–2 | 0–1 | 0–4 | 0–3 | 4–2 | 1–0 | | 1–1 | 1–2 | 1–1 | 2–1 | 2–0 | 1–1 |
| Tekstilshchik | 0–2 | 0–2 | 1–0 | 1–1 | 1–0 | 1–0 | 0–0 | 2–1 | 0–0 | 0–3 | 0–1 | 1–0 | 0–2 | 0–0 | 1–0 | 0–2 | | 1–1 | 1–3 | 0–0 | 1–1 | 2–2 |
| Tom | 2–1 | 0–1 | 0–1 | 3–0 | 1–2 | 0–2 | 0–3 | 1–1 | 1–1 | 1–3 | 0–0 | 1–1 | 0–1 | 3–0 | 1–2 | 1–2 | 0–2 | | 1–0 | 0–0 | 1–3 | 1–0 |
| Torpedo | 1–1 | 2–0 | 1–1 | 1–2 | 3–0 | 3–0 | 4–1 | 1–0 | 4–2 | 3–1 | 4–0 | 0–2 | 1–2 | 0–1 | 0–0 | 1–0 | 2–1 | 1–0 | | 0–1 | 1–0 | 0–1 |
| Veles | 1–1 | 1–1 | 0–1 | 0–1 | 3–0 | 2–1 | 1–1 | 2–1 | 2–2 | 3–1 | 3–1 | 1–3 | 1–1 | 4–2 | 1–0 | 5–0 | 2–1 | 0–0 | 0–5 | | 1–0 | 1–1 |
| Volgar | 1–1 | 1–0 | 0–0 | 2–1 | 1–0 | 2–1 | 2–1 | 1–1 | 3–0 | 0–1 | 3–1 | 1–1 | 2–2 | 1–1 | 0–1 | 2–0 | 0–0 | 2–1 | 3–2 | 1–2 | | 1–1 |
| Yenisey | 0–1 | 3–2 | 1–2 | 3–2 | 1–1 | 1–0 | 1–3 | 2–1 | 0–1 | 3–1 | 1–0 | 0–1 | 1–2 | 6–0 | 2–0 | 4–2 | 1–0 | 0–1 | 0–3 | 2–0 | 1–4 | |

Source: Soccerway
Legend: Blue = home team win; Yellow = draw; Red = away team win.

== Season statistics ==
=== Top goalscorers ===
As of matches played on 15 May 2021.

| Rank | Player | Club | Goals |
|---|---|---|---|
| 1 | (Russia) Ivan Sergeyev | Krylia Sovetov | 40 |
| 2 | (Russia) Dmitry Vorobyov | Orenburg | 24 |
| 3 | (Russia) Merabi Uridia | Neftekhimik Nizhnekamsk | 17 |
| 4 | (Armenia) Eduard Spertsyan | Krasnodar-2 | 16 |
| 5 | (Russia) Yegor Golenkov | Krylia Sovetov | 14 |
| 6 | (Russia) Batraz Gurtsiyev | Alania Vladikavkaz | 13 |
| 7 | (Russia) Konstantin Bazelyuk | SKA-Khabarovsk | 12 |
| 7 | (Ghana) Joel Fameyeh | Orenburg | 12 |
| 7 | (Russia) Amur Kalmykov | Torpedo Moscow | 12 |
| 7 | (Russia) Andrei Razborov | Fakel Voronezh | 12 |
