= 2018–19 FC Orenburg season =

Orenburg
2018–19 season
- Chairman: Vasily Stolypin
- Manager: Vladimir Fedotov
- Stadium: Gazovik Stadium
- Russian Premier League: 7th
- Russian Cup: Quarterfinal vs Arsenal Tula
- Top goalscorer: League: Aleksei Sutormin (8); All: Aleksei Sutormin (9)
Home colours	Away colours

The 2018–19 Orenburg season was the club's first season return in the Russian Premier League, the highest tier of association football in Russia, following their relegation at the end of the 2016–17, and their second in their 42 year history.

== Squad ==
Note: Flags indicate national team as defined under FIFA eligibility rules; some limited exceptions apply. Players may hold more than one non-FIFA nationality.

No.	Pos.	Nation	Player
1	GK	RUS	Aleksandr Rudenko
3	DF	BLR	Mikhail Sivakow
6	DF	CRO	Silvije Begić
7	FW	SRB	Đorđe Despotović
8	MF	CRO	Danijel Miškić
9	FW	RUS	Andrei Kozlov
10	MF	SLO	Denis Popović
11	FW	RUS	Andrea Chukanov
12	DF	RUS	Andrei Malykh
13	DF	RUS	Sergei Terekhov
15	DF	RUS	Dmitri Andreyev (captain)
16	MF	POR	Ricardo Alves
19	MF	RUS	Aleksei Sutormin

No.	Pos.	Nation	Player
23	MF	RUS	Sergei Breyev
29	MF	UZB	Vadim Afonin
31	DF	RUS	Vitali Shakhov
32	MF	RUS	Artyom Kulishev
56	GK	RUS	Aleksandr Dovbnya
58	DF	RUS	Adessoye Oyewole
60	DF	RUS	Savely Kozlov
66	MF	RUS	Mikhail Bakayev
77	MF	RUS	Nikita Malyarov
86	MF	RUS	Grigori Chirkin
88	FW	RUS	Artyom Galadzhan (on loan from Lokomotiv Moscow)
91	GK	RUS	Yevgeni Frolov

== Transfers ==
=== Summer ===
In: Note: Flags indicate national team as defined under FIFA eligibility rules; some limited exceptions apply. Players may hold more than one non-FIFA nationality.

No.	Pos.	Nation	Player
3	DF	BLR	Mikhail Sivakow (from (Russia) Amkar Perm)
7	FW	SRB	Đorđe Despotović (from (Kazakhstan) Astana)
8	MF	CRO	Danijel Miškić (from (Slovenia) Olimpija Ljubljana)
11	FW	RUS	Andrea Chukanov (from (Russia) Tyumen)
31	DF	RUS	Vitali Shakhov (from (Russia) Tosno)
32	MF	RUS	Artyom Kulishev (from (Russia) Dynamo Saint Petersburg)
38	DF	RUS	Daniil Krivoruchko (from (Russia) Orenburg-2)
41	DF	RUS	Sergei Pikalov
42	DF	RUS	Valentin Prilepin (from (Russia) Orenburg-2)
46	MF	RUS	Artyom Apalkin (from (Russia) Orenburg-2)
54	DF	RUS	Yuri Popov
56	GK	RUS	Aleksandr Dovbnya (from (Russia) SKA-Khabarovsk)
59	MF	RUS	Ilya Anokhin
62	MF	RUS	Vladislav Kalinin
63	GK	RUS	Ilya Uchkin
64	MF	RUS	Andrei Kireyev
65	MF	RUS	Anton Antonenko (from (Russia) Orenburg-2)
66	MF	RUS	Mikhail Bakayev (from (Russia) Anzhi Makhachkala)
67	DF	RUS	Kirill Artemyev
69	FW	RUS	Aleksandr Matveychuk (from (Russia) Orenburg-2)
77	MF	RUS	Nikita Malyarov (from (Russia) Kuban Krasnodar)
81	DF	RUS	Lev Belousov
82	MF	RUS	Vildan Amerkhanov (from (Russia) Orenburg-2)
84	MF	RUS	Aleksandr Belousov
88	FW	RUS	Artyom Galadzhan (on loan from (Russia) Lokomotiv Moscow)
90	GK	RUS	Aleksei Kenyaykin (from (Russia) Orenburg-2)
92	MF	RUS	Denis Fedenko (from (Russia) Orenburg-2)
93	FW	RUS	Mikhail Kukushkin (from (Russia) Orenburg-2)

Out: Note: Flags indicate national team as defined under FIFA eligibility rules; some limited exceptions apply. Players may hold more than one non-FIFA nationality.

No.	Pos.	Nation	Player
3	DF	RUS	Maksim Plopa (to (Russia) Baltika Kaliningrad)
5	MF	RUS	Roman Vorobyov (to (Russia) Rotor Volgograd)
9	MF	RUS	Vladimir Parnyakov (to (Russia) Tyumen)
11	MF	RUS	Dmitri Yefremov (end of loan from (Russia) CSKA Moscow)
20	MF	RUS	Andrei Mironov (to (Russia) Torpedo Moscow)
21	MF	RUS	Denis Kaykov (to (Russia) Volga Ulyanovsk)
24	MF	RUS	Igor Koronov (to (Russia) Tyumen)
26	MF	TJK	Farkhod Vosiyev (to (Russia) Tyumen)
27	MF	RUS	Artyom Popov (to (Russia) Rotor Volgograd)
33	MF	RUS	Igor Udaly (end of loan from (Russia) Anzhi Makhachkala)
43	MF	RUS	Igor Yepifanov
52	GK	RUS	Yuri Panteleyev
54	MF	RUS	Vadim Bilyukov (to (Russia) Volga Ulyanovsk)
55	MF	RUS	Dmitri Chvanov
84	DF	RUS	Yegor Strizhakov
90	FW	RUS	Artyom Delkin (to (Russia) Olimpiyets Nizhny Novgorod)
99	FW	RUS	Khasan Mamtov (to (Russia) Tambov)
—	FW	SVK	Michal Ďuriš (to (Cyprus) Anorthosis Famagusta, previously on loan)
—	FW	RUS	Islam Mashukov (released, previously on loan to (Russia) Khimki)

== Competitions ==
=== Russian Premier League ===
==== Results by round ====
Round	1	2	3	4	5	6	7	8	9	10	11	12	13	14	15	16	17	18	19	20	21	22	23	24	25	26	27	28	29	30
Ground	A	A	H	A	H	A	H	A	H	A	H	A	H	A	H	A	H	A	H	A	H	H	A	H	A	H	A	H	A	H
Result	L	W	W	W	D	L	L	D	L	W	D	D	W	L	W	L	L	D	W	L	W	L	W	W	L	D	L	D	W	W
Position	15	6	3	3	4	4	8	6	9	8	8	8	7	10	8	10	12	12	10	10	8	10	7	6	7	7	9	9	8	7

Updated to match(es) played on 26 May 2019. Source: See Results
A = Away; H = Home; W = Win; D = Draw; L = Loss

==== Results ====
28 July 2018 1	Spartak Moscow	1 – 0	Orenburg	Moscow
21:00 YEKT (UTC+5)	Gigot 4'	Report	Frolov (yellow card) 4'; Terekhov (yellow card) 36'; Oyewole (yellow card) 36'	Stadium: Otkritie Arena; Attendance: 36,672; Referee: Roman Galimov

5 August 2018 2	Krylia Sovetov	0 – 3	Orenburg	Samara
18:30 YEKT (UTC+5)	Mijailović (penalty missed) 37'; Sobolev (yellow card) 90'	Report	Kozlov 26', 45+1' (yellow card) 36'; Breyev (yellow card) 34' (goal) 38'; Sutormin (yellow card) 62'; Chirkin (yellow card) 68'	Stadium: Cosmos Arena; Attendance: 22,930; Referee: Vladislav Bezborodov

12 August 2018 3	Orenburg	1 – 0	Lokomotiv Moscow	Orenburg
16:00 YEKT (UTC+5)	Miškić (yellow card) 78'; Chukanov 90+1'; Begić (yellow card) 90+5'	Report	Al.Miranchuk (yellow card) 14'; Ćorluka (yellow card) 20'; Lysov (yellow card) 67'	Stadium: Gazovik Stadium; Attendance: 7,023; Referee: Sergey Ivanov

17 August 2018 4	Anzhi Makhachkala	1 – 3	Orenburg	Kaspiysk
21:30 YEKT (UTC+5)	Novoseltsev 12' (yellow card) 68'; Markelov (penalty missed) 41' (yellow card) 54'; Udaly (yellow card) 60'; Rabiu (yellow card) 72'	Report	Chirkin (yellow card) 8'; Begić (yellow card) 40'; Popović 69' (pen.); Sivakow (yellow card) 71'; Sutormin 77'; Chukanov 83'	Stadium: Anzhi Arena; Attendance: 6,253; Referee: Aleksei Eskov

26 August 2018 5	Orenburg	1 – 1	Krasnodar	Orenburg
16:00 YEKT (UTC+5)	Kozlov 22'	Report	Spajić (yellow card) 44'; Kaboré (yellow card) 57'; Stotsky (yellow card) 66'; Suleymanov 88'	Stadium: Gazovik Stadium; Attendance: 7,083; Referee: Sergei Karasev

2 September 2018 6	Dynamo Moscow	2 – 0	Orenburg	Khimki
18:30 YEKT (UTC+5)	Černych (yellow card) 34'; Rausch (yellow card) 36'; Sow (yellow card) 38'; Markov (yellow card) 63'; Lutsenko 90+4'	Report	Begić (yellow card) 55'; Sutormin (yellow card) 75'; Andreyev (yellow card) 80'	Stadium: Arena Khimki; Attendance: 6,909; Referee: Sergey Lapochkin

16 September 2018 7	Orenburg	1 – 2	Zenit St.Petersburg	Orenburg
16:00 YEKT (UTC+5)	Miškić (yellow card) 41'; Oyewole 48'	Report	Yerokhin 14', 45'; Smolnikov (yellow card) 50'; Neto (yellow card) 53'	Stadium: Gazovik Stadium; Attendance: 7,023; Referee: Vitali Meshkov

22 September 2018 8	Akhmat Grozny	1 – 1	Orenburg	Grozny
21:00 YEKT (UTC+5)	Ángel 22'; Doumbia (yellow card) 50'; Berisha (yellow card) 80'	Report	Popović (yellow card) 60'; Afonin (yellow card) 63' (goal) 67'; Oyewole (yellow card) 80'	Stadium: Akhmat-Arena; Attendance: 9,742; Referee: Sergey Ivanov

28 September 2018 9	Orenburg	0 – 1	CSKA Moscow	Orenburg
19:30 YEKT (UTC+5)	Afonin (yellow card) 30'; Sutormin (yellow card) 34'; Terekhov (yellow card) 39'; Kozlov (yellow card) 55'; Begić (yellow card) 77'; Chirkin (yellow card) 85'	Report	Chalov 32' (pen.); Bijol (yellow card) 42'	Stadium: Gazovik Stadium; Attendance: 6,917; Referee: Vladislav Bezborodov

6 October 2018 10	Rostov	0 – 1	Orenburg	Rostov-on-Don
18:30 YEKT (UTC+5)	Parshivlyuk (yellow card) 37'; Gațcan (yellow card) 90+1'	Report	Terekhov 11'; Andreyev (yellow card) 23'; Afonin (yellow card) 54'; Miškić (yellow card) 83'; Sutormin (yellow card) 90+2'; Oyewole (yellow card) 90+2'; Chukanov (yellow card) 90+3'	Stadium: Rostov Arena; Attendance: 25,147; Referee: Mikhail Vilkov

20 October 2018 11	Orenburg	0 – 0	Yenisey Krasnoyarsk	Orenburg
13:30 YEKT (UTC+5)	Popović (yellow card) 40'	Report	Gritsayenko (yellow card) 44'	Stadium: Gazovik Stadium; Attendance: 4,422; Referee: Nikolay Voloshin

27 October 2018 12	Arsenal Tula	2 – 2	Orenburg	Tula
18:30 YEKT (UTC+5)	Gorbatenko (yellow card) 21'; Mirzov 42'; Đorđević 64'; Tkachyov (yellow card) 78'	Report	Oyewole (yellow card) 38'; Sivakow (yellow card) 50'; Terekhov 61'; Popović 76' (yellow card) 85'	Stadium: Arsenal Stadium; Attendance: 8,744; Referee: Aleksey Sukhoy

5 November 2018 13	Orenburg	1 – 0	Rubin Kazan	Orenburg
16:00 YEKT (UTC+5)	Begić (yellow card) 18'; Sutormin 57' (pen.); Afonin (yellow card) 72'	Report	Kambolov (yellow card) 18'; Kudryashov (yellow card) 56'; Konovalov (yellow card) 63'; Sorokin (red card) 87'	Stadium: Gazovik Stadium; Attendance: 4,014; Referee: Sergey Lapochkin

10 November 2018 14	Ural Yekaterinburg	2 – 1	Orenburg	Yekaterinburg
16:00 YEKT (UTC+5)	Dimitrov 31', 86'; Fidler (yellow card) 84'; Ilyin (yellow card) 90+1'	Report	Miškić (yellow card) 45'; Malykh (yellow card) 62'; Begić 89'	Stadium: Central Stadium; Attendance: 4,213; Referee: Sergey Karasev

24 November 2018 15	Orenburg	1 – 0	Ufa	Orenburg
18:30 YEKT (UTC+5)	Popović (penalty missed) 58'; Sutormin 80'	Report	Alikin (yellow card) 52' (yellow-red card) 59'; Belenov (yellow card) 59'	Stadium: Gazovik Stadium; Attendance: 3,167; Referee: Vitaly Meshkov

1 December 2018 16	Orenburg	Postponed	Krylia Sovetov	Orenburg
18:30 YEKT (UTC+5)		Report		Stadium: Gazovik Stadium
Note: Match postponed due to the temperature dropping below -15 degrees.

8 December 2018 17	Lokomotiv Moscow	2 – 1	Orenburg	Moscow
19:30 YEKT (UTC+5)	Krychowiak (yellow card) 69'; Farfán 76', 81'; Barinov (yellow card) 90+2'	Report	Despotović 9' (yellow card) 66'; Sutormin (yellow card) 17'	Stadium: RZD Arena; Attendance: 7,218; Referee: Kirill Levnikov

1 March 2019 18	Orenburg	0 – 1	Anzhi Makhachkala	Orenburg
18:30 YEKT (UTC+5)	Begić (yellow card) 34'; Sivakow (yellow card) 39' (yellow-red card) 56'; Sutormin (yellow card) 53'	Report	Markelov (yellow card) 32'; Kulik 58'; Katsayev (yellow card) 69'; Dyupin (yellow card) 86'	Stadium: Gazovik Stadium; Attendance: 2,453; Referee: Vasiliy Kazartsev

11 March 2019 19	Krasnodar	2 – 2	Orenburg	Krasnodar
21:30 YEKT (UTC+5)	Ari (penalty missed) 10' 63'; Pereyra (yellow card) 23'; Skopintsev 73'; Suleymanov (yellow card) 86'	Report	Sutormin 41'; S.Kozlov (yellow card) 72'; Oyewole 89'	Stadium: Krasnodar Stadium; Attendance: 2,453; Referee: Aleksei Matyunin

16 March 2019 20	Orenburg	1 – 0	Dynamo Moscow	Orenburg
13:30 YEKT (UTC+5)	Begić (yellow card) 29'; Breyev (yellow card) 36'; Despotović 52' (yellow card) 53'; Andreyev (yellow card) 60'; Popović (yellow card) 74'	Report	Černych (yellow card) 15'; Holmén (yellow card) 38'; Lutsenko (yellow card) 62'; Tetteh (yellow card) 67'	Stadium: Gazovik Stadium; Attendance: 3,850; Referee: Sergey Ivanov

31 March 2019 21	Zenit St.Petersburg	3 – 1	Orenburg	Saint Petersburg
16:00 YEKT (UTC+5)	Zhirkov (yellow card) 40'; Azmoun 48', 88'; Rakitskiy (yellow card) 76' (goal) 81'	Report	Sutormin 33'; Malykh (yellow card) 75'	Stadium: Krestovsky Stadium; Attendance: 43,154; Referee: Nikolay Voloshin

3 April 2019 16	Orenburg	3 – 1	Krylya Sovetov	Orenburg
18:00 YEKT (UTC+5)	Sutormin 8' (pen.); Oyewole (yellow card) 11'; Begić 17'; Sivakow 54'; Popović (yellow card) 70'; Miškić (yellow card) 90+1'	Report	Sheydayev 12' (pen.); Zotov (yellow card) 19'; Burlak (yellow card) 53'; Anton (yellow card) 73'	Stadium: Gazovik Stadium; Attendance: 3,684; Referee: Pavel Kukuyan
Note: Match originally scheduled for 1 December 2018, bu postponed due to the temperature dropping below -15 degrees.

8 April 2019 22	Orenburg	1 – 3	Akhmat Grozny	Orenburg
19:00 YEKT (UTC+5)	Kozlov (yellow card) 3'; Terekhov 4'; Breyev (yellow card) 25'; Sivakow (yellow card) 60'; Popović (yellow card) 73'; Malykh (yellow card) 90+1'	Report	Ravanelli 37'; Ivanov 48'; Balaj 56'	Stadium: Gazovik Stadium; Attendance: 4,425; Referee: Vladislav Bezborodov

13 April 2019 23	CSKA Moscow	2 – 3	Orenburg	Moscow
16:00 YEKT (UTC+5)	Oblyakov 14'; Fernandes (yellow card) 19' (yellow-red card) 25'; Hernández 32'; Nishimura (yellow card) 74'; Sigurðsson (yellow card) 81'	Report	Popović (yellow card) 15'; Oyewole 18'; Sutormin 24'; Miškić (yellow card) 31'; Despotović 54' (yellow card) 79'; Malykh (yellow card) 69'; Frolov (yellow card) 90+5'	Stadium: VEB Arena; Attendance: 16,419; Referee: Sergey Lapochkin

20 April 2019 24	Orenburg	3 – 0	Rostov	Orenburg
16:00 YEKT (UTC+5)	Normann 41' (o.g.); Galadzhan 60' (yellow card) 81'; Chirkin 90+1'	Report	Normann (yellow card) 39'; Novoseltsev (yellow card) 82'	Stadium: Gazovik Stadium; Attendance: 5,471; Referee: Mikhail Vilkov

25 April 2019 25	Yenisey Krasnoyarsk	2 – 1	Orenburg	Krasnoyarsk
18:00 YEKT (UTC+5)	Sobolev 36' (pen.); Khubulov (yellow card) 84'; Ogude (yellow card) 90'; Kutyin 90+3'	Report	Popović (yellow card) 31'; Oyewole (yellow card) 32'; Chirkin (yellow card) 35' (yellow-red card) 64'; Sutormin (yellow card) 45'; S.Kozlov (yellow card) 64'; Sivakow (yellow card) 76'; Despotović 80'	Stadium: Central Stadium; Attendance: 5,709; Referee: Vasili Kazartsev

29 April 2019 26	Orenburg	1 – 1	Arsenal Tula	Orenburg
19:00 YEKT (UTC+5)	Afonin (yellow card) 15'; Malyarov (yellow card) 22'; Alves 78' (yellow card) 80'	Report	Mohammed (yellow card) 41'; Đorđević 62'; Mirzov (yellow card) 88'; Grigalava (yellow card) 90+1'	Stadium: Gazovik Stadium; Attendance: 3,553; Referee: Nikolay Voloshin

3 May 2019 27	Rubin Kazan	2 – 0	Orenburg	Kazan
18:30 YEKT (UTC+5)	Tsallagov (yellow card) 31'; Bashkirov 35'; Poloz 77' (pen.)	Report	Popović (yellow card) 27'; Malykh (yellow card) 45'; Sivakow (yellow card) 76'	Stadium: Kazan Arena; Attendance: 8,107; Referee: Vladimir Moskalyov

10 May 2019 28	Orenburg	2 – 2	Ural Yekaterinburg	Orenburg
13:30 YEKT (UTC+5)	Terekhov (yellow card) 55'; Malykh (yellow card) 60'; Miškić (yellow card) 65'; Sutormin 72'; Galadzhan 87' (yellow card) 90+4'; Popović (yellow card) 90+6'	Report	Aratore (yellow card) 42'; Oyewole 51' (o.g.); Pogrebnyak 90+6'	Stadium: Gazovik Stadium; Referee: Aleksei Eskov

18 May 2019 29	Ufa	0 – 2	Orenburg	Ufa
16:00 YEKT (UTC+5)	Salatić (yellow card) 73'; Alikin (yellow card) 83'	Report	Alves 15'; Miškić 87'	Stadium: Neftyanik Stadium; Attendance: 9,134; Referee: Aleksei Matyunin

26 May 2019 30	Orenburg	2 – 0	Spartak Moscow	Orenburg
16:00 YEKT (UTC+5)	Alves 8'; Popović (yellow card) 11'; Despotović (yellow card) 12'; Malykh (yellow card) 78'; Dovbnya (yellow card) 90'; Kulishev 90+4' (yellow card) 90+4'	Report	Guliyev (yellow card) 27'; Melgarejo (yellow card) 78'	Stadium: Gazovik Stadium; Attendance: 6,927; Referee: Kirill Levnikov

==== League table ====
Pos	Team	Pld	W	D	L	GF	GA	GD	Pts	Qualification or relegation
5	Spartak Moscow	30	14	7	9	36	31	+5	49	Qualification for the Europa League third qualifying round (Note: Lokomotiv Moscow won the 2018–19 Russian Cup. As they already qualified for the Champions League, the Europa League group stage spot (originally designated for the Cup winner) goes to the fourth-placed team, third qualifying round spot goes to fifth-placed team and second qualifying round spot goes to sixth-placed team.)
6	Arsenal Tula	30	12	10	8	40	33	+7	46	Qualification for the Europa League second qualifying round
7	Orenburg	30	12	7	11	39	34	+5	43	
8	Akhmat Grozny	30	11	9	10	29	30	−1	42	
9	Rostov	30	10	11	9	25	23	+2	41	

Updated to match(es) played on 26 May 2019. Source: Russian Premier League, Soccerway
Rules for classification: 1) Points; 2) Head-to-head points; 3) Head-to-head matches won; 4) Head-to-head goal difference; 5) Head-to-head goals scored; 6) Head-to-head away goals; 7) Matches won; 8) Goal difference; 9) Goals scored; 10) Away goals scored; 11) Play-off.

=== Russian Cup ===
25 September 2018 Round of 32	Dynamo Barnaul	0 – 2	Orenburg	Barnaul
15:00 YEKT (UTC+5)	Viktor Lipin (yellow card) 40'; Nesterenko (yellow card) 59'	Report	Galadzhan (yellow card) 37' (goal) 42'; Chukanov (yellow card) 79'; Kozlov 80'; Krivoruchko (yellow card) 85'	Stadium: Dynamo Stadium; Attendance: 6,500; Referee: Evgeny Turbin

31 October 2018 Round of 16	Orenburg	1 – 0	Tyumen	Orenburg
16:00 YEKT (UTC+5)	Sutormin 32' (pen.) (yellow card) 90+3'; Galadzhan (yellow card) 39'; Kulishev (yellow card) 54'	Report	Obukhov (yellow card) 31'; Karpov (yellow card) 90+2'	Stadium: Gazovik Stadium; Attendance: 2,509; Referee: Vladimir Moskalyov

28 November 2018 Quarterfinal 1st leg	Orenburg	2 – 4	Arsenal Tula	Orenburg
18:00 YEKT (UTC+5)	Sutormin (yellow card) 18'; Begić 41' (yellow card) 90'; Despotović 79'; Terekhov (yellow card) 90+2'	Report	Kangwa 7', 21'; Ožegović (yellow card) 30'; Kombarov 62'; Levashov (yellow card) 90+4'; Đorđević 90+5'	Stadium: Gazovik Stadium; Attendance: 1,615; Referee: Aleksei Matyunin

6 March 2019 Quarterfinal 2nd leg	Arsenal Tula	1 – 1 (5 – 3 agg.)	Orenburg	Khimki
21:00 YEKT (UTC+5)	Kombarov (yellow card) 39'; Grigalava 54'	Report	Begić (yellow card) 51'; Malyarov (yellow card) 70'; Popović 86' (pen.)	Stadium: Arena Khimki; Attendance: 740; Referee: Aleksey Eskov

== Squad statistics ==
As of match played 26 May 2019

=== Appearances and goals ===
No.	Pos	Nat	Player	Total		Premier League		Russian Cup	
No.	Pos	Nat	Player	Apps	Goals	Apps	Goals	Apps	Goals
1	GK	(Russia) RUS	Aleksandr Rudenko	1	0	0	0	1	0
3	DF	(Belarus) BLR	Mikhail Sivakow	24	1	19+3	1	2	0
6	DF	(Croatia) CRO	Silvije Begić	26	3	23	2	3	1
7	FW	(Serbia) SRB	Đorđe Despotović	25	5	20+3	4	1+1	1
8	MF	(Croatia) CRO	Danijel Miškić	30	1	26+1	1	3	0
9	FW	(Russia) RUS	Andrei Kozlov	23	4	9+12	3	2	1
10	MF	(Slovenia) SLO	Denis Popović	25	3	21+3	2	1	1
11	FW	(Russia) RUS	Andrea Chukanov	22	2	4+15	2	2+1	0
12	DF	(Russia) RUS	Andrei Malykh	25	0	22+1	0	2	0
13	DF	(Russia) RUS	Sergei Terekhov	31	3	28	3	3	0
15	DF	(Russia) RUS	Dmitri Andreyev	15	0	11+3	0	1	0
16	MF	(Portugal) POR	Ricardo Alves	13	3	3+7	3	2+1	0
19	MF	(Russia) RUS	Aleksei Sutormin	31	9	29	8	2	1
23	MF	(Russia) RUS	Sergei Breyev	14	1	12+1	1	1	0
29	MF	(Uzbekistan) UZB	Vadim Afonin	26	1	19+7	1	0	0
31	DF	(Russia) RUS	Vitali Shakhov	8	0	5+1	0	2	0
32	MF	(Russia) RUS	Artyom Kulishev	12	1	1+8	1	2+1	0
38	DF	(Russia) RUS	Daniil Krivoruchko	1	0	0	0	1	0
42	DF	(Russia) RUS	Valentin Prilepin	1	0	0	0	1	0
56	GK	(Russia) RUS	Aleksandr Dovbnya	11	0	9	0	2	0
57	MF	(Russia) RUS	Yevgeni Bolotov	1	0	0	0	0+1	0
58	DF	(Russia) RUS	Adessoye Oyewole	24	3	22	3	2	0
60	DF	(Russia) RUS	Savely Kozlov	9	0	8	0	1	0
77	MF	(Russia) RUS	Nikita Malyarov	14	0	8+2	0	3+1	0
86	MF	(Russia) RUS	Grigori Chirkin	18	1	6+9	1	1+2	0
88	FW	(Russia) RUS	Artyom Galadzhan	11	3	4+4	2	2+1	1
91	GK	(Russia) RUS	Yevgeni Frolov	23	0	22	0	1	0
92	MF	(Russia) RUS	Denis Fedenko	1	0	0	0	0+1	0
Players away from the club on loan:
Players who left Orenburg during the season:

=== Goal scorers ===
Place	Position	Nation	Number	Name	Premier League	Russian Cup	Total
1	MF	(Russia)	19	Aleksei Sutormin	8	1	9
2	FW	(Serbia)	7	Đorđe Despotović	4	1	5
3	FW	(Russia)	9	Andrei Kozlov	3	1	4
4	DF	(Russia)	13	Sergei Terekhov	3	0	3
4	DF	(Russia)	58	Adessoye Oyewole	3	0	3
4	MF	(Portugal)	16	Ricardo Alves	3	0	3
4	MF	(Slovenia)	10	Denis Popović	2	1	3
4	DF	(Croatia)	6	Silvije Begić	2	1	3
4	FW	(Russia)	88	Artyom Galadzhan	2	1	3
8	FW	(Russia)	11	Andrea Chukanov	2	0	2
11	MF	(Russia)	23	Sergei Breyev	1	0	1
11	MF	(Uzbekistan)	29	Vadim Afonin	1	0	1
11	DF	(Belarus)	3	Mikhail Sivakow	1	0	1
11	MF	(Russia)	86	Grigori Chirkin	1	0	1
11	MF	(Croatia)	8	Danijel Miškić	1	0	1
11	MF	(Russia)	32	Artyom Kulishev	1	0	1
11				Own goal	1	0	1
				TOTALS	39	6	45

=== Disciplinary record ===
Number	Nation	Position	Name	Premier League		Russian Cup		Total	
Number	Nation	Position	Name	Yellow card	Red card	Yellow card	Red card	Yellow card	Red card
3	(Belarus)	DF	Mikhail Sivakow	7	1	0	0	7	1
6	(Croatia)	DF	Silvije Begić	7	0	2	0	9	0
7	(Serbia)	FW	Đorđe Despotović	4	0	0	0	4	0
8	(Croatia)	MF	Danijel Miškić	7	0	0	0	7	0
9	(Russia)	FW	Andrei Kozlov	2	0	0	0	2	0
10	(Slovenia)	MF	Denis Popović	11	0	0	0	11	0
11	(Russia)	FW	Andrea Chukanov	1	0	1	0	2	0
12	(Russia)	DF	Andrei Malykh	7	0	0	0	7	0
13	(Russia)	DF	Sergei Terekhov	3	0	1	0	4	0
15	(Russia)	DF	Dmitri Andreyev	3	0	0	0	3	0
16	(Portugal)	MF	Ricardo Alves	1	0	0	0	1	0
19	(Russia)	MF	Aleksei Sutormin	7	0	2	0	9	0
23	(Russia)	MF	Sergei Breyev	3	0	0	0	3	0
29	(Uzbekistan)	MF	Vadim Afonin	5	0	0	0	5	0
32	(Russia)	MF	Artyom Kulishev]	1	0	1	0	2	0
38	(Russia)	DF	Daniil Krivoruchko	0	0	1	0	1	0
56	(Russia)	GK	Aleksandr Dovbnya	1	0	0	0	1	0
58	(Russia)	DF	Adessoye Oyewole	6	0	0	0	6	0
60	(Russia)	DF	Savely Kozlov	3	0	0	0	3	0
77	(Russia)	MF	Nikita Malyarov	1	0	1	0	2	0
86	(Russia)	MF	Grigori Chirkin	5	1	0	0	5	1
88	(Russia)	FW	Artyom Galadzhan	2	0	2	0	4	0
91	(Russia)	MF	Yevgeni Frolov	2	0	0	0	2	0
			TOTALS	89	2	11	0	100	2
