= 2018–19 Russian Cup =

Tournament details
- Country: Russia
- Teams: 97

Final positions
- Champions: Lokomotiv Moscow (8th title)
- Runners-up: Ural Yekaterinburg

Tournament statistics
- Matches played: 92
- Goals scored: 236 (2.57 per match)

The 2018–19 Russian Cup, also known as the Olimp Russian Cup, was the 27th season of the Russian football knockout tournament since the dissolution of Soviet Union. The Russian Cup is organized by the Russian Football Union.

The competition started on 21 July 2018 and concluded on 22 May 2019.

== First round ==
21 July 2018 First round	Kuban Holding Pavlovskaya (5)	2–0	Urozhay Krasnodar (3)	Pavlovskaya
23:00 MSK (UTC+3)	Zhdanov 18'; Vagidov 85'	Report		Stadium: Stadion Central'ny; Attendance: 1700; Referee: M. Vasilchenko

21 July 2018 First round	Dynamo Stavropol (3)	2–0	Angusht Nazran (3)	Stavropol
22:00 MSK (UTC+3)	Yesin 36'; Lyadnev 42' (pen.)	Report		Stadium: Dynamo Stavropol Stadium; Attendance: 1000; Referee: A. Koltunov

21 July 2018 First round	Biolog-Novokubansk (3)	1–0	Akademiya Futbola (4)	Novokubansk
17:00 MSK (UTC+3)	Kasyanov 31'	Report		Stadium: Stadion Biolog; Attendance: 800; Referee: A. Ivannikov

22 July 2018 First round	Avtofavorit Pskov (4)	0–2	Luki-Energiya (3)	Pskov
21:00 MSK (UTC+3)		Report	Smirnov 11'; Sorokin 42' (o.g.)	Stadium: Sportivnyj Kompleks 747; Attendance: 250; Referee: A. Fedotov

22 July 2018 First round	Atom Novovoronezh (4)	0–1	Metallurg Lipetsk (3)	Novovoronezh
23:00 MSK (UTC+3)		Report	Ivannikov 16'	Stadium: Start Stadium; Attendance: 300; Referee: S. Kostevich

== Second round ==
West and Center

30 July 2018 Second round	Luki-Energiya	1–0	Pskov-747	Velikiye Luki
18:30	Reshetnikov 90+'	Report		Stadium: Ekspress Stadium; Attendance: 1,500; Referee: Y. Bobrovskiy

30 July 2018 Second round	Zvezda Saint Petersburg	3–1	Leningradets Leningrad Oblast	Saint Petersburg
17:00	Agafonov 31'; Ulyanenkov 45'; Sablin 81'	Report	Petrov 29' (pen.)	Stadium: Nova Arena; Attendance: 1,000; Referee: A. Smolin

30 July 2018 Second round	Kaluga	2–1	Veles Moscow
18:30	Yevstigneyev 50'; Volgin 75'	Report	Zaikin 65' (pen.)

== Round of 32 ==
The round of 32 was played from 25 September 2018 to 10 October 2018.

25 September 2018	FC Dynamo Barnaul	0–2	Gazovik Orenburg	Barnaul
12:00 MSK		Report	Galadzhan 42'; Kozlov 80'	Stadium: Dynamo Stadium; Attendance: 6500; Referee: Evgeny Turbin

25 September 2018	FC Neftekhimik Nizhnekamsk	2–3	FC Ural	Nizhnekamsk
17:00 MSK	Babyr 63'; Morozov 86'	Report	Bavin 42'; Morozov 52' (o.g.); Zhigulyov 60'	Stadium: Neftekhimik Stadium; Attendance: 2000; Referee: Igor Nizovtsev

26 September 2018	FC Sakhalin	1-2	Arsenal Tula	Tomsk
10:00 MSK	Gagloyev 70'	Report	Mohammed 10'; Denisov 29'	Stadium: Stadion Temp; Attendance: 500; Referee: Pavel Shadykhanov

26 September 2018	FC SKA-Khabarovsk	3-3 (a.e.t.) (2-4 p)	FC Akhmat Grozny	Khabarovsk
11:00 MSK	Kabaev 78'; Dedechko 87'; Kvekveskiri 119'	Report	Sadayev 26'; Mitrishev 85'; Balaj 109' (o.g.)	Stadium: Lenin Stadium; Attendance: 3901; Referee: Vladimir Moskalyov

26 September 2018	FC Syzran-2003	0–4	FK Rostov	Syzran
16:00 MSK		Report	Shomurodov 21'; Salétros 31'; Kjartansson 64', 69'	Stadium: Kristall Stadium; Attendance: 2070; Referee: Ivan Saraev

26 September 2018	Luki-Energia	1–2	Yenisey	Velikiye Luki
16:30 MSK	Sagirov 5'	Report	Ovsyankin 35' (o.g.); Ogude 87'	Stadium: Stadion Ekspress; Attendance: 3500; Referee: Vasiliy Kazartsev

26 September 2018	Volgar Astrakhan	0–4	Zenit Saint Peterburg	Astrakhan
17:00 MSK		Report	Anyukov 8'; Mak 35'; Zabolotny 61'; Kokorin 88'	Stadium: Central Stadium; Attendance: 16200; Referee: Aleksey Sukhoy

26 September 2018	Chernomorets	0–1	Spartak Moscow	Novorossiysk
17:30 MSK		Report	Zé Luís 28'	Stadium: Central Stadium "Trud"; Attendance: 12500; Referee: Kirill Levnikov

26 September 2018	FC Chayka	1–2	Anzhi Mahachkala	Peschanokopskoye
18:00 MSK	Khokhlachev 57'	Report	Dolgov 41'; Chancellor 84'	Stadium: Chayka Central Stadium; Attendance: 1980; Referee: Vladimir Seldyakov

26 September 2018	FC Khimki	0–1 (a.e.t.)	Rubin Kazan	Khimki
18:00 MSK		Report	Ryazantsev 98' (o.g.)	Stadium: Rodina Stadium; Attendance: 1400; Referee: Ivan Sidenkov

26 September 2018	FC Nizhny Novgorod	0–0 (a.e.t.) (5-3 p)	FC Ufa	Nizhny Novgorod
18:00 MSK		Report		Stadium: Nizhny Novgorod Stadium; Attendance: 17193; Referee: Vitaly Meshkov

26 September 2018	Torpedo Moscow	0–1	Dynamo Moscow	Moscow
19:15 MSK		Report	Markov 34' (pen.)	Stadium: Eduard Streltsov Stadium; Attendance: 4096; Referee: Aleksey Eskov

26 September 2018	Baltika Kaliningrad	2–3 (a.e.t.)	Lokomotiv Moscow	Kaliningrad
20:00 MSK	Kasaev 28'; Magal 64'	Report	A. Miranchuk 35', 105'; Éder 88'	Stadium: Kaliningrad Stadium; Attendance: 25231; Referee: Aleksey Amelin

27 September 2018	Avangard Kursk	0–2	FC Krasnodar	Kursk
16:00 MSK		Report	Markov 9'; Shishkin 65'	Stadium: Trudovye Rezervy Stadium; Attendance: 6500; Referee: Stanislav Vasilyev

27 September 2018	FC Tambov	1–2 (a.e.t.)	Krylia Sovetov Samara	Novosibirsk
18:30 MSK	Klenkin 37'	Report	Chicherin 72'; Anton 95'	Stadium: Spartak Stadium; Attendance: 4600; Referee: Nikolay Voloshin

10 October 2018	FC Tyumen	1–1 (a.e.t.) (3-0 p)	CSKA Moscow	Tyumen
16:00 MSK	Stolyarenko 120'	Report	Pukhov 109'	Stadium: Geolog Stadium; Attendance: 10400; Referee: Sergey Ivanov

== Round of 16 ==
The round of 16 was played from 25 October 2018 to 1 November 2018.

25 October 2018	Rubin Kazan	1–0	Dynamo Moscow	Kazan
18:00 MSK	Azmoun 48'	Report		Stadium: Kazan Arena; Attendance: 4112; Referee: Vasilyev Stanislav

31 October 2018	Orenburg	1–0	Tyumen	Orenburg
14:00 MSK	Sutormin 19'	Report		Stadium: Gazovik Stadium; Attendance: 2509; Referee: Vladimir Moskalyov

31 October 2018	Ural Yekaterinburg	2–0 (a.e.t.)	Nizhny Novgorod	Yekaterinburg
17:00 MSK	Dimitrov 104'; Yevseyev 120'	Report	Abazov (red card) 108'	Stadium: Central Stadium; Attendance: 3528; Referee: Evgeny Turbin

31 October 2018	Lokomotiv Moscow	4–1	Yenisey Krasnoyarsk	Moscow
19:30 MSK	Eder 13'; An. Miranchuk 39' 57'; Al. Miranchuk 48'	Report	Kutyin 84'	Stadium: RZD Arena; Attendance: 8276; Referee: Alexey Sukhoy

31 October 2018	Akhmat Grozny	0–2	Arsenal Tula	Grozny
19:30 MSK		Report	Đorđević 16'; Mirzov 70'	Stadium: Akhmat-Arena; Attendance: 9328; Referee: Kirill Levnikov

1 November 2018	Krylia Sovetov Samara	1–2 (a.e.t.)	Krasnodar	Samara
18:00 MSK	Sobolev 54'	Report	Claesson 76'; Ignatyev 111'	Stadium: Cosmos Arena; Attendance: 11093; Referee: Vasily Kazartsev

1 November 2018	Rostov	3–1	Zenit Saint Petersburg	Rostov-on-Don
19:00 MSK	Logashov 4'; Yusupov 82'; Hadžikadunić 90'	Report	Driussi 11'	Stadium: Rostov Arena; Attendance: 35086; Referee: Roman Galimov

1 November 2018	Spartak Moscow	1–0	Anzhi Makhachkala	Moscow
20:00 MSK	Hanni 20'	Report		Stadium: Otkritie Arena; Attendance: 15848; Referee: Nikolay Voloshin

== Quarter-finals ==
The first legs were played on 28 November 2018 and 6 December 2018. The second legs were played on 24 February 2019.

Team 1	Agg.	Team 2	1st leg	2nd leg
Lokomotiv Moscow	2–0	Rubin Kazan	1–0	1–0
Spartak Moscow	1–2	Ural Yekaterinburg	1–1	0–1
Orenburg	3–5	Arsenal Tula	2–4	1–1
Krasnodar	2–3	FC Rostov	2–2	0–1

=== First leg ===
28 November 2018 First leg	Orenburg (1)	2–4	Arsenal Tula (1)	Orenburg
21:00 MSK	Begić 41'; Despotović 79'	Report	Kangwa 7', 21'; Kombarov 79'; Đorđević 90+5'	Stadium: Gazovik Stadium; Attendance: 1,615; Referee: Aleksei Matyunin

6 December 2018 First leg	Lokomotiv Moscow (1)	1–0	Rubin Kazan (1)	Moscow
00:30 MSK	Ćorluka 54'	Report		Stadium: RZD Arena; Attendance: 8,290; Referee: Nikolay Voloshin

6 December 2018 First leg	Krasnodar (1)	2–2	Rostov (1)	Krasnodar
00:30 MSK	Ignatyev 17'; Cueva 36'	Report	Skopintsev 40'; Gaţcan 89'	Stadium: Krasnodar Stadium; Attendance: 15,428; Referee: Evgeny Turbin

6 December 2018 First leg	Spartak Moscow (1)	1–1	Ural Yekaterinburg (1)	Moscow
00:30 MSK	Hanni 48'	Report	Ilyin 67'	Stadium: Otkritie Arena; Attendance: 9,333; Referee: Vasily Kazartsev

=== Second leg ===
24 February 2019 Second leg	Rostov (1)	1–0 (3–2 agg.)	Krasnodar (1)	Rostov-on-Don
19:00 MSK	Popov 87'	Report		Stadium: Rostov Arena; Attendance: 35,097; Referee: Vladimir Moskalyov

6 March 2019 Second leg	Arsenal Tula (1)	1–1 (5–3 agg.)	Orenburg (1)	Khimki
19:00 MSK	Grigalava 54'	Report	Popović 86' (pen.)	Stadium: Arena Khimki; Attendance: 740; Referee: Aleksey Eskov

6 March 2019 Second leg	Rubin Kazan (1)	0–1 (0–2 agg.)	Lokomotiv Moscow (1)	Kazan
19:00 MSK		Report	Höwedes 77'	Stadium: Kazan Arena; Attendance: 10,349; Referee: Sergey Ivanov

7 March 2019 Second leg	Ural Yekaterinburg (1)	1–0 (2–1 agg.)	Spartak Moscow (1)	Yekaterinburg
19:00 YEKT	Bicfalvi 34'	Report		Stadium: Central Stadium; Attendance: 18,292; Referee: Mikhail Vilkov

== Semi-finals ==
The first legs were played on 3 April 2019. The second legs were played on 15 May 2019.

Team 1	Agg.	Team 2	1st leg	2nd leg
Lokomotiv Moscow	4–2	FC Rostov	2–2	2–0
Ural Yekaterinburg	3–2	Arsenal Tula	1–0	2–2

=== First leg ===
3 April 2019 First leg	Lokomotiv Moscow (1)	2–2	Rostov (1)	Moscow
19:30 MSK	An. Miranchuk 67'; Novoseltsev 85' (o.g.)	Report	Eremonko 50'; Popov 84' (pen.)	Stadium: RZD Arena; Attendance: 10,171; Referee: Kirill Levnikov

3 April 2019 First leg	Ural Yekaterinburg (1)	1–0	Arsenal Tula (1)	Yekaterinburg
19:00 YEKT	Panyukov 17'	Report		Stadium: Central Stadium; Attendance: 12,304; Referee: Aleksei Eskov

=== Second leg ===
15 May 2019 Second leg	Rostov (1)	0–2 (2–4 agg.)	Lokomotiv Moscow (1)	Rostov-on-Don
19:30 MSK		Report	Zhemaletdinov 45+2'; Smolov 63'	Stadium: Rostov Arena; Attendance: 32,580; Referee: Sergey Lapochkin

15 May 2019 Second leg	Arsenal Tula (1)	2–2 (2–3 agg.)	Ural Yekaterinburg (1)	Tula
19:00 MSK	Haroyan 58' (o.g.); Mirzov 67'	Report	Bicfalvi 1'; El Kabir 24'	Stadium: Arsenal Stadium; Attendance: 12,850; Referee: Sergei Karasev

== Final ==
22 May 2019
19:30 SAMT

Lokomotiv Moscow	1–0	Ural Yekaterinburg
Barinov 27'	Report

Samara Arena, Samara
Attendance: 38,018
Referee: Sergey Lapochkin (Saint Petersburg)
