= Yevgeny Grachyov =

Russian footballer (born 2000)

Personal information
- Full name: Yevgeny Eduardovich Grachyov
- Date of birth: 11 December 2000 (age 25)
- Place of birth: Krasnoyarsk, Russia
- Height: 1.70 m (5 ft 7 in)
- Position: Midfielder

Senior career*
| Years | Team | Apps | (Gls) |
| 2018–2021 | FC Rassvet Krasnoyarsk | | |
| 2021–2022 | FC Yenisey-2 Krasnoyarsk | 25 | (3) |
| 2021–2022 | FC Yenisey Krasnoyarsk | 1 | (0) |
- * Club domestic league appearances and goals as of 10 June 2022

Yevgeny Eduardovich Grachyov (Russian: Евгений Эдуардович Грачев; born 11 December 2000) is a Russian football player.

== Club career ==
He made his debut in the Russian Football National League for FC Yenisey Krasnoyarsk on 17 October 2021 in a game against FC Krasnodar-2.
