= Ruslan Yunusov =

Russian footballer

Personal information
- Full name: Ruslan Anvarovich Yunusov
- Date of birth: 16 May 1999 (age 27)
- Place of birth: Krasnoyarsk, Russia
- Height: 1.90 m (6 ft 3 in)
- Position: Goalkeeper

Youth career
- Rotor Krasnoyarsk

Senior career*
Years	Team	Apps	(Gls)
2016	Achinsk		
2017–2018	Yenisey Krasnoyarsk	0	(0)
2019	Chita	19	(0)
2020–2021	Chayka Peschanokopskoye	5	(0)
2021–2022	Irtysh Omsk	13	(0)
2023–2025	Sakhalin	55	(0)
2025–2026	Yenisey Krasnoyarsk	0	(0)
2025–2026	Yenisey-2 Krasnoyarsk	12	(0)
- * Club domestic league appearances and goals as of 16 May 2026

Ruslan Anvarovich Yunusov (Russian: Руслан Анварович Юнусов; born 16 May 1999) is a Russian football player who plays as a goalkeeper. He also holds Tajikistani citizenship.

== Club career ==
He made his debut in the Russian Football National League for Chayka Peschanokopskoye on 16 August 2020 in a game against Krylia Sovetov Samara.
