= Antipin =

Antipin (Russian: Антипин) is a Russian masculine surname, its feminine counterpart is Antipina. It may refer to

- Stanislav Antipin (born 1995), Russian football player
- Viktor Antipin (born 1992), Kazakh ice-hockey player, son of Vladimir
- Vladimir Antipin (born 1970), Kazakh ice-hockey player
