= Andrea Chukanov =

Italian-born Russian football player (born 1995)

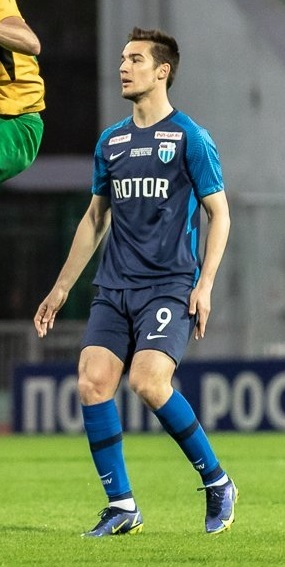
- Chukanov with Rotor Volgograd in 2022

Personal information
- Full name: Andrea Vyacheslavovich Chukanov
- Date of birth: 18 December 1995 (age 30)
- Place of birth: Cosenza, Italy
- Height: 1.88 m (6 ft 2 in)
- Positions: Midfielder; forward

Team information
- Current team: Yenisey Krasnoyarsk
- Number: 7

Youth career
- 2002–2004: Smena St. Petersburg
- 2004–2012: Khimki
- 2013–2015: Lokomotiv Moscow

Senior career*
Years	Team	Apps	(Gls)
2015–2018	Tyumen	86	(8)
2018–2021	Orenburg	59	(4)
2021	→ Veles Moscow (loan)	11	(1)
2021–2022	Rotor Volgograd	32	(9)
2022	Kuban Krasnodar	18	(2)
2023	Shinnik Yaroslavl	13	(0)
2023–2024	Tyumen	13	(1)
2024	Yenisey-2 Krasnoyarsk	4	(1)
2024–	Yenisey Krasnoyarsk	57	(2)

International career
2014	Russia U-19	5	(1)
- * Club domestic league appearances and goals as of 16 May 2026

Andrea Vyacheslavovich Chukanov (Russian: Андреа Вячеславович Чуканов; born 18 December 1995) is an Italian-born Russian football player who plays for Yenisey Krasnoyarsk.

== Career ==
He made his debut in the Russian Football National League for Tyumen on 30 August 2015 in a game against Zenit-2 St. Petersburg.

== Personal life ==
His father, Vyacheslav Chukanov, is the 1980 Olympic champion in equestrian show jumping.

He was born in Italy at the time when his father had been living and working there for six years. His mother is also Russian. As a result, he has an Italian birth certificate but not the passport; his family never applied for citizenship despite being eligible. When Chukanov was 6, his family moved back to Russia, namely St. Petersburg, where he started his youth career. While living in Cosenza, he developed an interest in football and started to support Lazio ‒ his father's favorite team. He has also cited Hernán Crespo as his childhood footballing idol.

== Career statistics ==
As of 16 May 2026

Club	Season	League			Cup		Other		Total	
Club	Season	Division	Apps	Goals	Apps	Goals	Apps	Goals	Apps	Goals
Tyumen	2015–16	Russian First League	16	1	1	0	2 (Note: Appearances in FNL Cup)	0	19	1
Tyumen	2016–17	Russian First League	38	3	1	0	3	2	42	5
Tyumen	2017–18	Russian First League	32	4	1	0	5	1	38	5
Tyumen	Total		86	8	3	0	10	3	99	11
Orenburg	2018–19	Russian Premier League	19	2	3	0	—		22	2
Orenburg	2019–20	Russian Premier League	17	0	1	0	—		18	0
Orenburg	2020–21	Russian First League	23	2	0	0	—		23	2
Orenburg	Total		59	4	4	0	0	0	63	4
Veles Moscow (loan)	2020–21	Russian First League	11	1	—		—		11	1
Rotor Volgograd	2021–22	Russian First League	32	9	3	1	—		35	10
Kuban Krasnodar	2022–23	Russian First League	18	2	2	0	—		20	2
Shinnik Yaroslavl	2022–23	Russian First League	13	0	—		—		13	0
Tyumen	2023–24	Russian First League	13	1	1	0	—		14	1
Yenisey-2 Krasnoyarsk	2024	Russian Second League B	4	1	—		—		4	1
Yenisey Krasnoyarsk	2024–25	Russian First League	33	0	0	0	—		33	0
Yenisey Krasnoyarsk	2025–26	Russian First League	24	2	2	0	—		26	2
Yenisey Krasnoyarsk	Total		57	2	2	0	0	0	59	2
Career total			293	28	15	1	10	3	318	32
