= Leonid Reshetnikov =

Leonid Reshetnikov may refer to:

- Leonid Reshetnikov (footballer)
- Leonid Petrovich Reshetnikov, Soviet and Russian secret service agent
