= Aleksandr Kanaplin =

Russian footballer

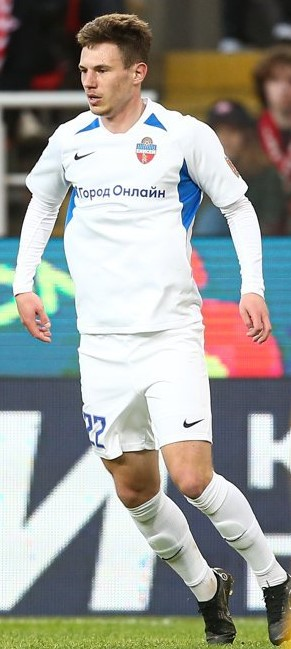
- Kanaplin with Yenisey in 2022

Personal information
- Full name: Aleksandr Yevgenyevich Kanaplin
- Date of birth: 3 September 2000 (age 26)
- Place of birth: Rostov-on-Don, Russia
- Height: 1.84 m (6 ft 0 in)
- Position: Forward

Team information
- Current team: FC Yenisey Krasnoyarsk
- Number: 8

Youth career
- FC Rostov

Senior career*
Years	Team	Apps	(Gls)
2019–2021	FC Strogino Moscow	32	(7)
2021–	FC Yenisey Krasnoyarsk	100	(7)
2021–2023	FC Yenisey-2 Krasnoyarsk	16	(5)
- * Club domestic league appearances and goals as of 16 May 2026

Aleksandr Yevgenyevich Kanaplin (Russian: Александр Евгеньевич Канаплин; born 3 September 2000) is a Russian football player who plays for FC Yenisey Krasnoyarsk.

== Club career ==
He made his debut in the Russian Football National League for FC Yenisey Krasnoyarsk on 31 July 2021 in a game against FC Alania Vladikavkaz.
