= Aleksandr Nadolsky =

Russian footballer

Personal information
- Full name: Aleksandr Vladimirovich Nadolsky
- Date of birth: 9 April 2001 (age 25)
- Place of birth: Kansk, Russia
- Height: 1.75 m (5 ft 9 in)
- Positions: Midfielder; defender

Team information
- Current team: FC Yenisey Krasnoyarsk
- Number: 18

Senior career*
Years	Team	Apps	(Gls)
2018–2019	FC Chertanovo-2 Moscow	16	(0)
2019–2023	FC Chertanovo Moscow	47	(3)
2021–2022	→ FC Yenisey Krasnoyarsk (loan)	6	(0)
2021–2022	→ FC Yenisey-2 Krasnoyarsk (loan)	13	(1)
2023–2024	FC Murom	34	(2)
2024–	FC Yenisey Krasnoyarsk	36	(3)
2024–	FC Yenisey-2 Krasnoyarsk	4	(3)

International career
2016–2017	Russia U-16	8	(1)
- * Club domestic league appearances and goals as of 16 May 2026

Aleksandr Vladimirovich Nadolsky (Russian: Александр Владимирович Надольский; born 9 April 2001) is a Russian football player who plays for FC Yenisey Krasnoyarsk.

== Club career ==
He made his debut in the Russian Professional Football League for FC Chertanovo-2 Moscow on 18 July 2018 in a game against FC Murom.

He made his Russian Football National League for FC Chertanovo Moscow on 12 October 2019 in a game against FC Avangard Kursk.
