= Stanislav Goncharov =

Russian footballer

Personal information
- Full name: Stanislav Viktorovich Goncharov
- Date of birth: 9 June 1983 (age 43)
- Height: 1.77 m (5 ft 9 1/2 in)
- Position: Midfielder

Youth career
- FC Dynamo Barnaul

Senior career*
Years	Team	Apps	(Gls)
2002	FC Zdorovy Mir Krasnoyarsk		
2003–2012	FC Yenisey Krasnoyarsk	242	(66)
2012–2013	FC Smena Komsomolsk-na-Amure	43	(13)
2014–2015	FC Restavratsiya Krasnoyarsk		
2016	FC Rassvet-Restavratsiya Krasnoyarsk		
- * Club domestic league appearances and goals

Stanislav Viktorovich Goncharov (Russian: Станислав Викторович Гончаров; born 9 June 1983) is a former Russian professional football player.

== Club career ==
He played two seasons in the Russian Football National League for FC Yenisey Krasnoyarsk.

== Honours ==
- Russian Second Division Zone East best player: 2005.
- Russian Second Division Zone East top scorer: 2005 (19 goals).
