= Yevgeny Frolov (footballer, born 1988) =

Russian footballer

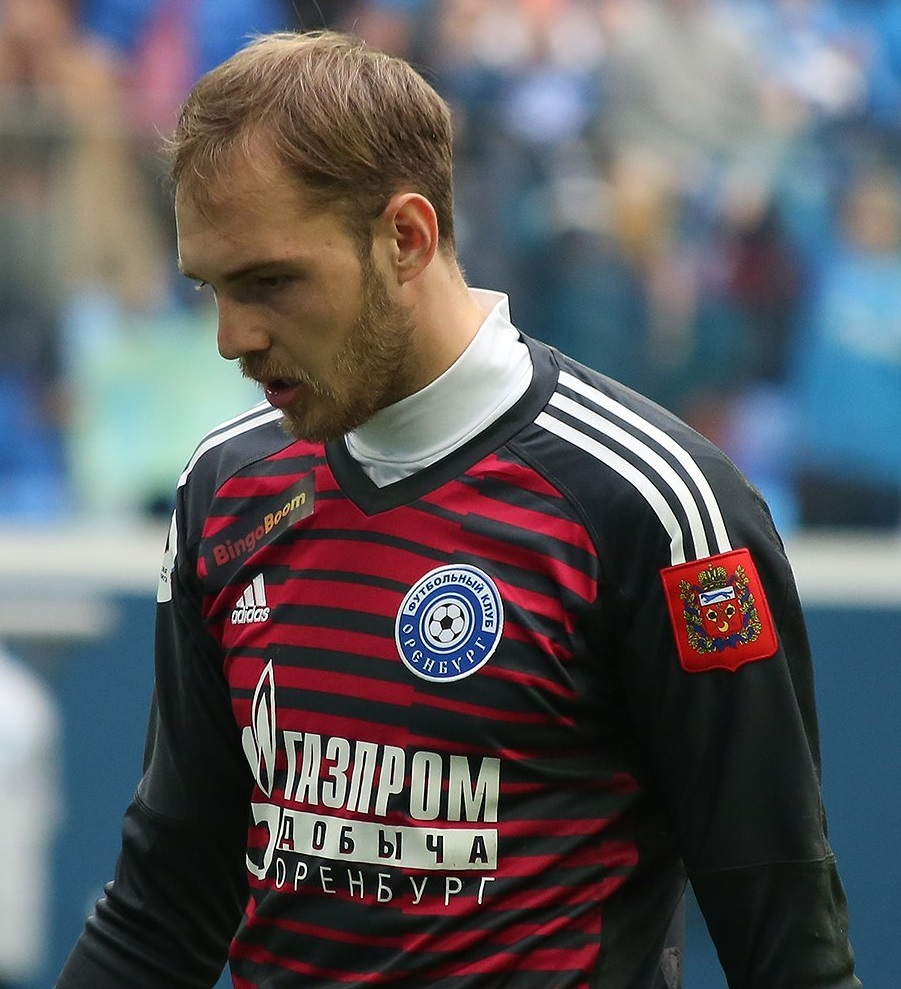
- Frolov with FC Orenburg in 2019

Personal information
- Full name: Yevgeny Konstantinovich Frolov
- Date of birth: 5 February 1988 (age 38)
- Place of birth: Zheleznogorsk, Krasnoyarsk Krai, Russian SFSR
- Height: 1.94 m (6 ft 4 in)
- Position: Goalkeeper

Team information
- Current team: Krylia Sovetov Samara
- Number: 39

Senior career*
Years	Team	Apps	(Gls)
2005–2011	Mordovia Saransk	41	(0)
2010	→ Znamya Truda Orekhovo-Zuyevo (loan)	14	(0)
2010	→ Torpedo Moscow (loan)	12	(0)
2011–2014	Dynamo Moscow	1	(0)
2014–2015	Sakhalin Yuzhno-Sakhalinsk	25	(0)
2015–2016	Kuban Krasnodar	13	(0)
2017	Baltika Kaliningrad	11	(0)
2017–2019	Orenburg	41	(0)
2019	Sochi	1	(0)
2020–	Krylia Sovetov Samara	32	(0)
2024–	Krylia Sovetov-2 Samara	1	(0)
- * Club domestic league appearances and goals as of 17 May 2026

Yevgeny Konstantinovich Frolov (Russian: Евгений Константинович Фролов; born 5 February 1988) is a Russian professional football player who plays as a goalkeeper for Krylia Sovetov Samara and Krylia Sovetov-2 Samara.

== Club career ==
On 29 June 2019, he signed with PFC Sochi.

On 2 February 2020, he signed a 2.5-year contract with Krylia Sovetov Samara.

In April 2020 he gave an interview to sports journalist in which he criticized President Putin, saying he failed to take tangible action to support businesses and the population amid the Coronavirus pandemic in Russia.

On 30 May 2022, Frolov signed a new 2-year contract with Krylia Sovetov.

== Career statistics ==
As of 29 October 2026

Club	Season	League			Cup		Continental		Other		Total	
Club	Season	Division	Apps	Goals	Apps	Goals	Apps	Goals	Apps	Goals	Apps	Goals
Mordovia Saransk	2005	Russian Second League	1	0	0	0	–		–		1	0
Mordovia Saransk	2006	Russian Second League	12	0	3	0	–		–		15	0
Mordovia Saransk	2007	Russian First League	7	0	0	0	–		–		7	0
Mordovia Saransk	2009	Russian Second League	3	0	1	0	–		–		4	0
Mordovia Saransk	2011–12	Russian First League	18	0	2	0	–		–		20	0
Mordovia Saransk	Total		41	0	6	0	0	0	0	0	47	0
Znamya Truda (loan)	2010	Russian Second League	14	0	1	0	–		–		15	0
Torpedo Moscow (loan)	2010	Russian Second League	12	0	–		–		–		12	0
Dynamo Moscow	2011–12	Russian Premier League	1	0	0	0	–		–		1	0
Dynamo Moscow	2012–13	Russian Premier League	0	0	0	0	0	0	–		0	0
Dynamo Moscow	2013–14	Russian Premier League	0	0	0	0	–		–		0	0
Dynamo Moscow	Total		1	0	0	0	0	0	0	0	1	0
Sakhalin	2014–15	Russian First League	25	0	0	0	–		3 (Note: Appearances in the FNL Cup)	0	28	0
Kuban Krasnodar	2015–16	Russian Premier League	0	0	1	0	–		–		1	0
Kuban Krasnodar	2016–17	Russian First League	13	0	0	0	–		–		13	0
Kuban Krasnodar	Total		13	0	1	0	0	0	0	0	14	0
Baltika Kaliningrad	2016–17	Russian First League	11	0	–		–		–		11	0
Orenburg	2017–18	Russian First League	19	0	1	0	–		–		20	0
Orenburg	2018–19	Russian Premier League	22	0	1	0	–		–		23	0
Orenburg	Total		41	0	2	0	0	0	0	0	43	0
Sochi	2019–20	Russian Premier League	1	0	1	0	–		–		2	0
Krylia Sovetov Samara	2019–20	Russian Premier League	10	0	–		–		–		10	0
Krylia Sovetov Samara	2020–21	Russian First League	18	0	2	0	–		–		20	0
Krylia Sovetov Samara	2021–22	Russian Premier League	0	0	0	0	–		–		0	0
Krylia Sovetov Samara	2022–23	Russian Premier League	3	0	0	0	–		–		3	0
Krylia Sovetov Samara	2023–24	Russian Premier League	0	0	2	0	–		–		2	0
Krylia Sovetov Samara	2024–25	Russian Premier League	0	0	1	0	–		–		1	0
Krylia Sovetov Samara	2025–26	Russian Premier League	1	0	1	0	–		–		2	0
Krylia Sovetov Samara	2026–27	Russian Premier League	0	0	2	0	–		–		2	0
Krylia Sovetov Samara	Total		32	0	8	0	0	0	0	0	40	0
Krylia Sovetov-2 Samara	2024	Russian Second League B	1	0	–		–		–		1	0
Career total			192	0	19	0	0	0	3	0	214	0
