= Stanislav Antipin =

Russian footballer

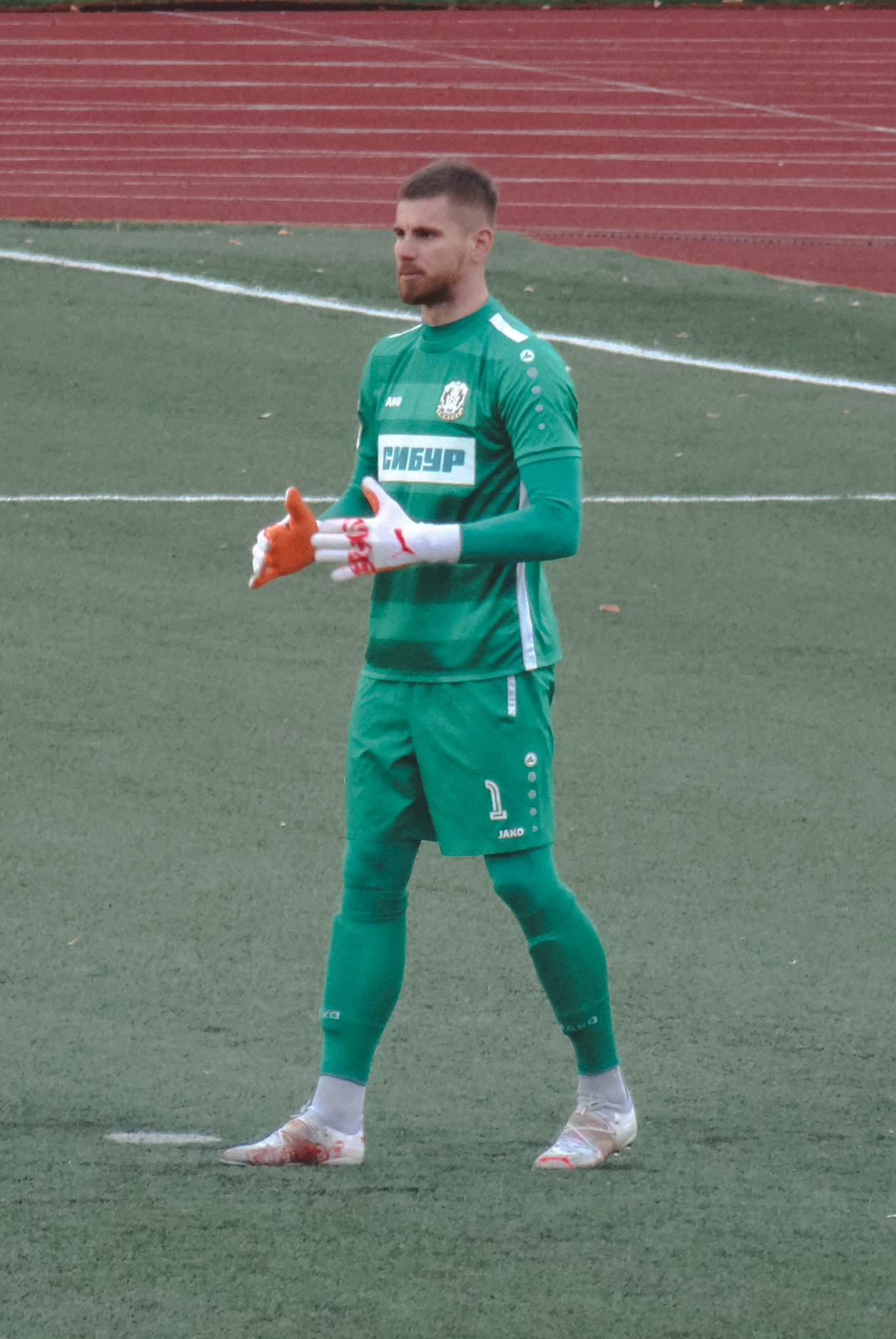

Personal information
- Full name: Stanislav Andreyevich Antipin
- Date of birth: 17 February 1995 (age 31)
- Place of birth: Tyumen, Russia
- Height: 1.88 m (6 ft 2 in)
- Position: Goalkeeper

Team information
- Current team: FC Yenisey Krasnoyarsk
- Number: 23

Youth career
- 2012–2014: FC Krasnodar

Senior career*
Years	Team	Apps	(Gls)
2013–2015	FC Krasnodar-2	3	(0)
2015	FC MITOS Novocherkassk	14	(0)
2016–2017	FC Zenit-Izhevsk	33	(0)
2017–2020	FC Shinnik Yaroslavl	20	(0)
2020–2021	FC Volgar Astrakhan	16	(0)
2021–2022	FC Tyumen	16	(0)
2022–	FC Yenisey Krasnoyarsk	46	(0)
2023–2024	FC Yenisey-2 Krasnoyarsk	1	(0)
- * Club domestic league appearances and goals as of 16 May 2026

Stanislav Andreyevich Antipin (Russian: Станислав Андреевич Антипин; born 17 February 1995) is a Russian football player who plays for FC Yenisey Krasnoyarsk.

== Club career ==
He made his debut in the Russian Professional Football League for FC Krasnodar-2 on 31 August 2013 in a game against FC Volgar Astrakhan.

He made his Russian Football National League debut for FC Shinnik Yaroslavl on 4 November 2017 in a game against FC Rotor Volgograd.
