= Leonid Reshetnikov (footballer) =

Russian footballer

Personal information
- Full name: Leonid Aleksandrovich Reshetnikov
- Date of birth: 30 May 1986 (age 40)
- Height: 1.78 m (5 ft 10 in)
- Position: Midfielder

Senior career*
Years	Team	Apps	(Gls)
2004	FC Rotor-2 Volgograd	10	(0)
2005	FC Tekstilshchik Kamyshin	24	(1)
2009	FC Dongazdobycha Sulin		
2010	FC Bataysk-2007	15	(2)
2012–2013	FC Taganrog	39	(8)
2013–2014	FC Khimki	29	(6)
2014–2015	FC Chernomorets Novorossiysk	21	(3)
2015–2016	FC Neftekhimik Nizhnekamsk	48	(12)
2017	FC Chayka Peschanokopskoye	11	(0)
2017	FC Mordovia Saransk	11	(1)
2018–2020	FC Luki-Energiya Velikiye Luki	45	(12)
- * Club domestic league appearances and goals

Leonid Aleksandrovich Reshetnikov (Russian: Леонид Александрович Решетников; born 30 May 1986) is a Russian former professional football player.

== Club career ==
He made his Russian Football National League debut for FC Neftekhimik Nizhnekamsk on 11 July 2016 in a game against FC Yenisey Krasnoyarsk.
