= Artyom Galadzhan =

Russian footballer (born 1998)

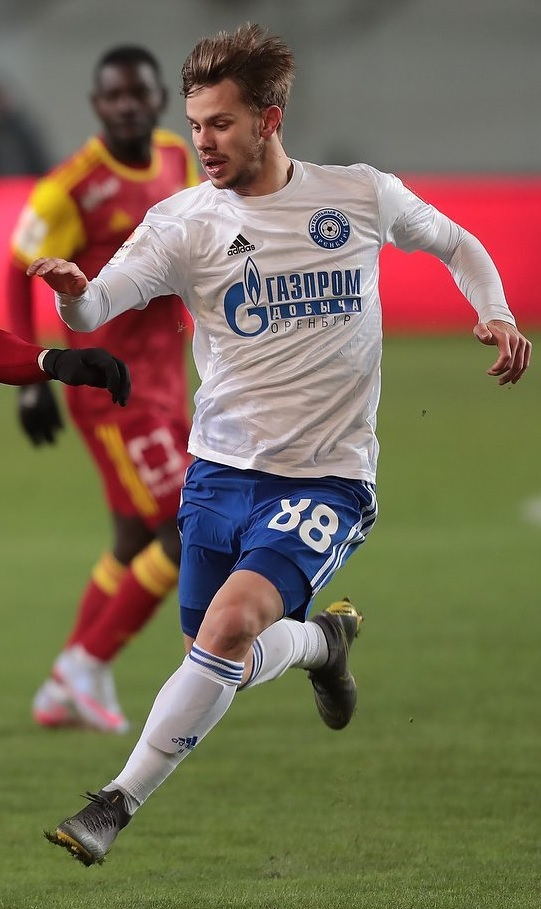
- Galadzhan with FC Orenburg in 2019

Personal information
- Full name: Artyom Sergeyevich Galadzhan
- Date of birth: 28 May 1998 (age 28)
- Place of birth: Novorossiysk, Russia
- Height: 1.80 m (5 ft 11 in)
- Position: Forward

Youth career
- 2010–2016: Lokomotiv Moscow

Senior career*
Years	Team	Apps	(Gls)
2016–2020	Lokomotiv Moscow	6	(0)
2017–2018	→ Kazanka Moscow	17	(10)
2018–2019	→ Orenburg (loan)	12	(2)
2020	→ Rotor Volgograd (loan)	2	(0)
2020–2021	Nizhny Novgorod	12	(0)
2022	Tom Tomsk	13	(2)
2023	Ural-2 Yekaterinburg	9	(0)
2024	Tver	5	(1)
2024–2025	Irtysh Omsk	14	(1)

International career
2013	Russia U15	4	(2)
2013–2014	Russia U16	9	(3)
2014–2015	Russia U17	23	(10)
- * Club domestic league appearances and goals as of 15 June 2025

Artyom Sergeyevich Galadzhan (Russian: Артём Сергеевич Галаджан; born 22 May 1998) is a Russian football player who plays as a forward.

== Club career ==
Galadzhan made his debut in the Russian Premier League for Lokomotiv Moscow on 26 November 2016 in a game against Ural Yekaterinburg.

On 28 August 2018, he joined Orenburg on loan for the 2018–19 season. On 26 July 2019, the loan was renewed for the 2019–20 season.

On 24 January 2020, Galadzhan moved on loan to Rotor Volgograd.

On 3 September 2020, Galadzhan signed a 2-year contract with Nizhny Novgorod.

== International ==
He represented Russia national under-17 football team at the 2015 UEFA European Under-17 Championship.

== Honours ==
=== Club ===
Lokomotiv Moscow

- Russian Premier League: 2017–18

== Career statistics ==
=== Club ===
As of 21 May 2022

Club	Season	League			Cup		Continental		Other		Total	
Club	Season	Division	Apps	Goals	Apps	Goals	Apps	Goals	Apps	Goals	Apps	Goals
Lokomotiv Moscow	2016–17	RPL	4	0	0	0	–		–		4	0
Lokomotiv Moscow	2017–18	RPL	2	0	0	0	0	0	–		2	0
Lokomotiv Moscow	Total		6	0	0	0	0	0	0	0	6	0
Kazanka Moscow	2017–18	PFL	16	10	–		–		4 (Note: Appearances in the FNL Cup)	0	20	10
Kazanka Moscow	2018–19	PFL	1	0	–		–		–		1	0
Kazanka Moscow	Total		17	10	0	0	0	0	4	0	21	10
Orenburg	2018–19	RPL	8	2	3	1	–		–		11	3
Orenburg	2019–20	RPL	4	0	1	0	–		–		5	0
Orenburg	Total		12	2	4	1	0	0	0	0	16	3
Rotor Volgograd	2019–20	FNL	2	0	–		–		5	1	7	1
Nizhny Novgorod	2020–21	FNL	9	0	0	0	–		–		9	0
Nizhny Novgorod	2021–22	RPL	3	0	2	0	–		–		5	0
Nizhny Novgorod	Total		12	0	2	0	0	0	0	0	14	0
Tom Tomsk	2021–22	FNL	13	2	–		–		–		13	2
Career total			58	14	6	1	0	0	9	1	73	16
