= Vladimir Yesin =

Russian footballer

Personal information
- Full name: Vladimir Aleksandrovich Yesin
- Date of birth: 11 January 1995 (age 31)
- Place of birth: Saint Petersburg, Russia
- Height: 1.84 m (6 ft 0 in)
- Positions: Midfielder; forward

Youth career
- Lokomotiv St. Petersburg

Senior career*
Years	Team	Apps	(Gls)
2013	Petrotrest St. Petersburg	2	(0)
2013–2015	Dynamo St. Petersburg	53	(4)
2016–2017	Zenit Penza	23	(2)
2017	Kaluga	12	(1)
2018	Kyzyltash Bakhchisaray	13	(2)
2018	Dynamo Stavropol	12	(1)
2019	Luftëtari	0	(0)
2019–2020	Kafa Feodosia	13	(2)
2020	Znojmo	1	(0)
2020–2021	Salyut Belgorod	27	(0)
2021–2022	Slavia Mozyr	31	(1)
2023	Smorgon	24	(0)
2024–2025	Murom	51	(0)
2025	Dynamo St. Petersburg	7	(3)
Total		269	(16)

International career
2014	Russia U19	3	(0)
- * Club domestic league appearances and goals as of 1 November 2025

Vladimir Aleksandrovich Yesin (Russian: Владимир Александрович Есин; born 11 January 1995) is a Russian football player.

== Club career ==
He made his debut in the Russian Football National League for FC Petrotrest Saint Petersburg on 20 May 2013 in a game against FC Rotor Volgograd.
