= Savely Kozlov =

Russian footballer

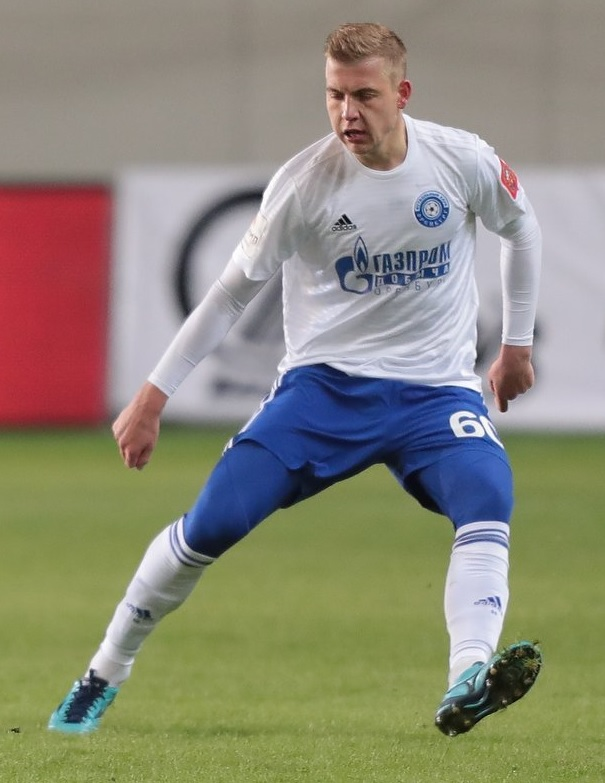
- Kozlov with Orenburg in 2019

Personal information
- Full name: Savely Alekseyevich Kozlov
- Date of birth: 19 January 1997 (age 29)
- Place of birth: Reutov, Russia
- Height: 1.92 m (6 ft 4 in)
- Position: Centre-back

Team information
- Current team: FC Dynamo Makhachkala (development director)

Youth career
- –2014: FC Lokomotiv Moscow
- 2015: FShM Moscow
- 2015–2016: FC Krylia Sovetov Samara
- 2016–2017: PFC CSKA Moscow

Senior career*
Years	Team	Apps	(Gls)
2018	FC Tyumen	23	(2)
2019–2022	FC Orenburg	34	(1)

Managerial career
- 2022–: FC Dynamo Makhachkala (development director)
- * Club domestic league appearances and goals

Savely Alekseyevich Kozlov (Russian: Савелий Алексеевич Козлов; born 19 January 1997) is a Russian football official and a former player. He works as a development director with FC Dynamo Makhachkala.

== Club career ==
He made his debut in the Russian Football National League for FC Tyumen on 4 March 2018 in a game against FC Olimpiyets Nizhny Novgorod.

He made his Russian Premier League debut for FC Orenburg on 11 March 2019 in a game against FC Krasnodar, as a starter.
