= Andrei Kozlov (footballer, born 1989) =

Russian footballer

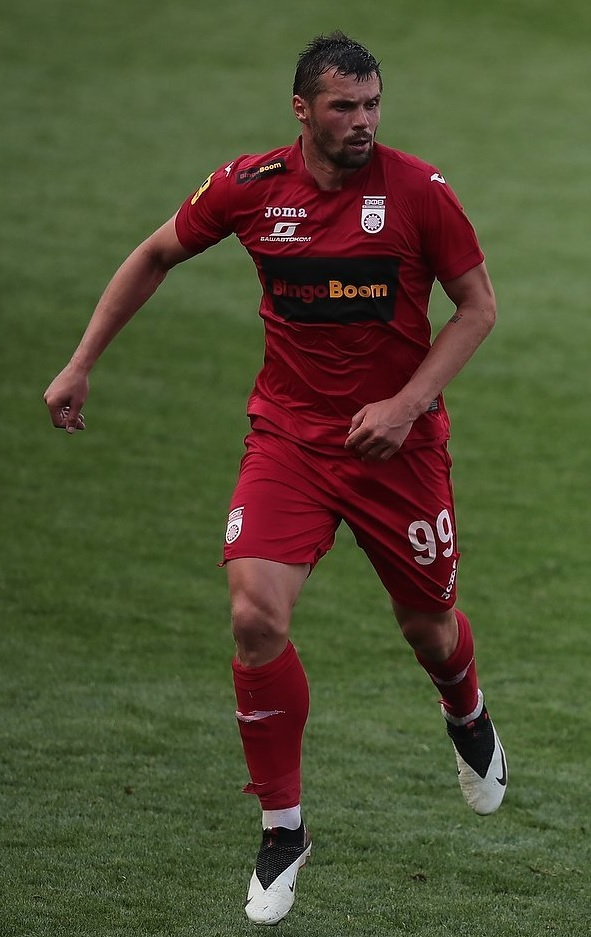
- Kozlov with FC Ufa in 2020

Personal information
- Full name: Andrei Vladimirovich Kozlov
- Date of birth: 23 February 1989 (age 37)
- Place of birth: Bryansk, Russian SFSR
- Height: 1.86 m (6 ft 1 in)
- Position: Forward

Senior career*
Years	Team	Apps	(Gls)
2008–2009	FC Yelets	47	(4)
2009	FC Dnepr Smolensk	9	(2)
2010	FC Gubkin	18	(3)
2010–2011	FC Fakel Voronezh	32	(6)
2012	FC Ufa	9	(3)
2012–2013	FC Torpedo Moscow	14	(0)
2013	FC Metallurg-Kuzbass Novokuznetsk	11	(0)
2013	FC Dynamo Bryansk	20	(7)
2014	FC Khimki	9	(5)
2014–2016	FC Volga Nizhny Novgorod	66	(13)
2016–2017	FC Yenisey Krasnoyarsk	61	(22)
2018–2019	FC Orenburg	30	(3)
2019–2020	FC Ufa	16	(1)
2020–2021	FC Orenburg	34	(6)
2021–2022	FC Kuban Krasnodar	21	(3)
2022–2023	FC Rotor Volgograd	14	(3)
2023	FC Amkar Perm	8	(0)
2024	FC Dynamo Bryansk	1	(0)
- * Club domestic league appearances and goals as of 16 November 2024

Andrei Vladimirovich Kozlov (Russian: Андрей Владимирович Козлов; born 23 February 1989) is a Russian former football player.

== Club career ==
On 27 June 2019, he returned to FC Ufa.
