= Dmitry Fedoseyev =

Russian football official and defender (born 1965)

Dmitry Fedoseev
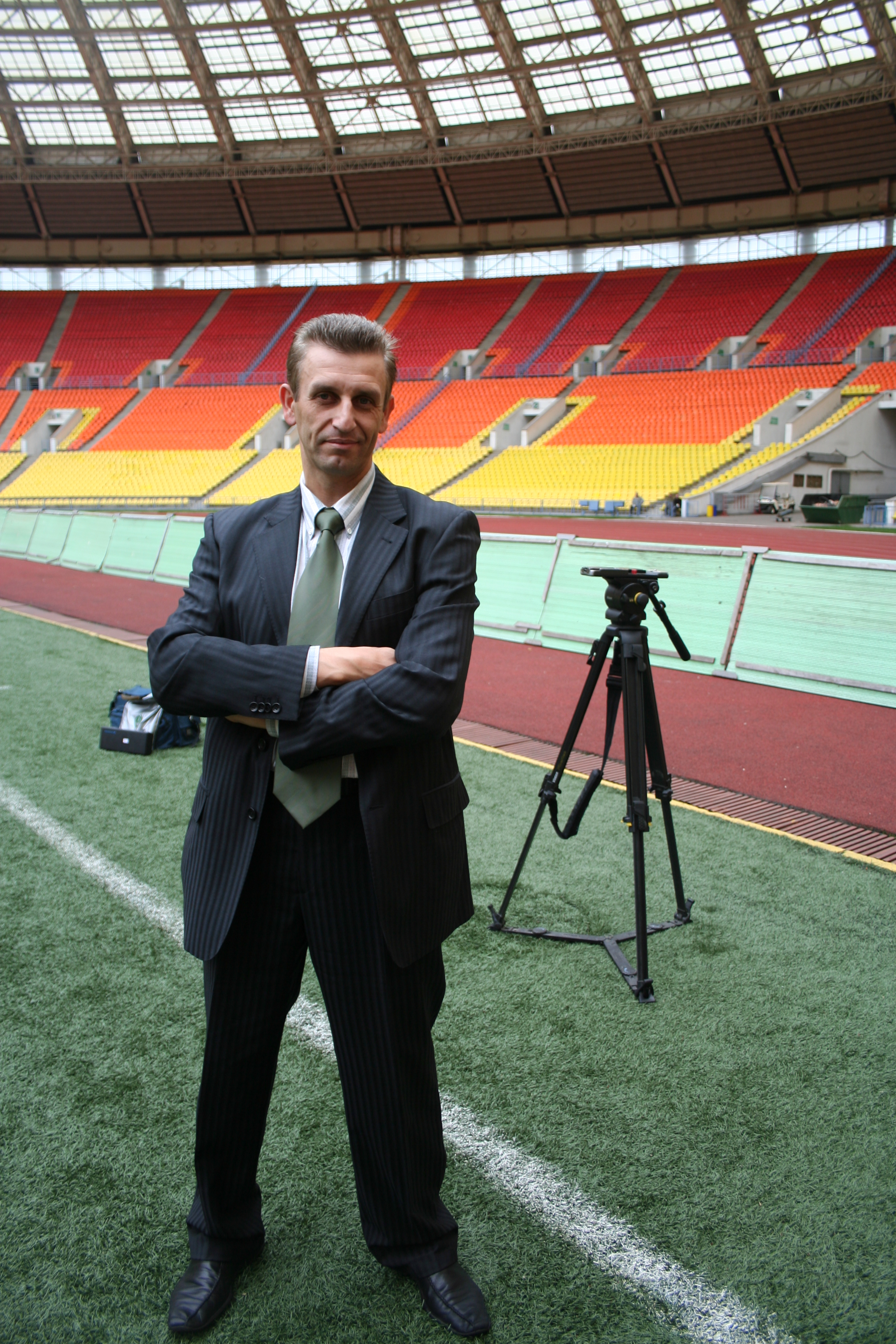

Personal information
- Full name: Dmitry Borisovich Fedoseev
- Date of birth: October 3, 1965 (age 61)
- Place of birth: Perm, RSFSR, USSR
- Position: Defender

Team information
- Current team: Yenisey Krasnoyarsk (director)

Senior career*
Years	Team	Apps	(Gls)
1993–1999	MFC Norilsk nickel		
- * Club domestic league appearances and goals

Dmitry Borisovich Fedoseev (Russian: Дмитрий Борисович Федосеев; born October 3, 1965) is a retired Russian football player (1993–1999), coach (1993–1998), and sports functionary (1993–1999). From 2004 to 2009 he was the chairman of the committee for physical culture, sports and tourism in the administration of Norilsk. From 2004 to 2009 he was the chief technologist of the Luzhniki Olympic Complex. He is the director of FC Yenisey Krasnoyarsk.

== Biography ==
Fedoseev was born on October 3, 1965, in Perm. From 1982 to 1987 he studied in the department of Cryolithology and Glaciology in the geographical faculty of Moscow State University. From 1987 to 1989 he served in the Soviet Army. In 1989, he moved to Norilsk. He worked in the scientific-research and design institute of bases and underground structures named after N. M. Gersevanov (NIIOSP). He was engaged in scientific-research works on construction and exploitation of buildings and structures in the conditions of permafrost soils. He also worked for some time in the institute of Norilskproekt and the MMC Norilsk Nickel.

Since childhood he had always played football at the amateur level, continuing to play while studying at the university, in the army, and in his free time in Norilsk. In 1993, at the age of 28 he began his professional football career. He was established in the Norilsk football club, Norilsk (in 1998 it was renamed as the mini-football club MFC Norilsk nickel). In this same club he moved from being a player (1993–1999), to being the head coach (1993–1998), to being the general director (1993–1999). In 2000, after a year of work as executive and technical director left the club, he became the founder of the club. Fodesoeev initiated and created the Norilsk branch of the Russian association of mini-football (NO RAMF), in which he was chairman. He organized a regional system of competitions (national, regional, district and city competitions) and worked with the fan club MFC Norilsk nickel.

From 2000 to 2002 he was the chairman of the committee for physical culture, sports and tourism in the administration of Norilsk. He was also the Founder of the Polar federation of alpine skiing and snowboarding.

In 2002, he moved to Moscow. From 2004 to 2009 — chief technologist of the Luzhniki Olympic Complex. He was the main executor of works on preparation of the Luzhniki Stadium to the Uefa Champions League final on 21 May 2008 (a portable natural field). At his own expense he built a mini-soccer field in the kindergarten in the Kuzminki, where he began to train children of preschool age. In 2010, he initiated and created a federation of football on the version of K2 (two touches). He is married with two children and is fluent in English.

== Bibliography ==
=== Interview ===
- Любимов Дмитрий. Тот прав, у кого больше трав // Московский комсомолец. — 28 марта 2007 года.

=== Articles ===
- Хантайский Л. Как следует вдохнули и... // Заполярная правда. — No. 101. — 24 июня 1998 года.
- Крамарева Т. Голы. Очки. Секунды // Заполярная правда. — No. 162. — 24 октября 2001 года.
- Шпенков Михаил. Финал Лиги чемпионов пройдет в «Лужниках» на мятлике и овсянице // Известия. — 5 октября 2007 года.
- Охнянский Олег. Мини-футбольная команда «Норильский никель»: как это было // Футбольный курьер. — 2008. — Январь.
- В «Лужниках» – новый газон // Советский спорт. — 5 июля 2008 года.
