= Silvije Begić =

Croatian footballer

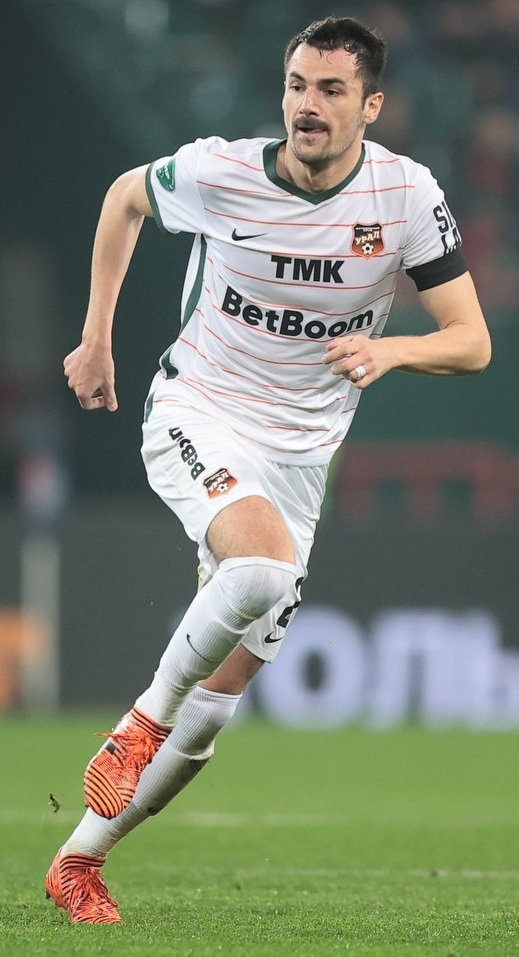
- Begić with Ural Yekaterinburg in 2022

Personal information
- Date of birth: 3 June 1993 (age 33)
- Place of birth: Posušje, Bosnia and Herzegovina
- Height: 1.97 m (6 ft 6 in)
- Position: Centre-back

Team information
- Current team: Ural Yekaterinburg
- Number: 2

Youth career
- 2004–2009: Posušje
- 2009–2011: Imotski

Senior career*
| Years | Team | Apps | (Gls) |
| 2012 | Posušje | | |
| 2012–2013 | Kamen Ivanbegovina | 25 | (2) |
| 2013–2015 | Rudeš | 29 | (3) |
| 2015–2017 | Inter Zaprešić | 39 | (1) |
| 2017–2019 | Orenburg | 51 | (4) |
| 2019–2022 | Rubin Kazan | 27 | (0) |
| 2021 | → Krylia Sovetov Samara (loan) | 10 | (1) |
| 2022– | Ural Yekaterinburg | 100 | (10) |
- * Club domestic league appearances and goals as of 16 May 2026

Silvije Begić (born 3 June 1993) is a Croatian-Russian professional footballer who plays as a centre-back for Ural Yekaterinburg in Russia.

== Club career ==
A native of the border town Posušje in Bosnia and Herzegovina, Begić spent most of his formative years at the local Posušje, before moving just across the border to Imotski. He remained there for two seasons at U17 and U19 levels, playing alongside future Split player Ante Majstorović, before returning to his home town where he made his senior debut. In the summer of 2012, he returned to Croatian football by joining the freshly promoted Treća HNL Jug side Kamen Ivanbegovina. He established himself as a first team player there immediately, and his games earned him a move up to the Druga HNL and Rudeš in Zagreb, one of his first games being a cup match against his former team Kamen.

The young defender established himself as a first team player there in the 2014/2015 season, making his name by scoring a goal where he reportedly "brought a high ball down to his feet, dribbled past three or four players, reached the goalkeeper and calmly scored". His games overall were noted by that season's Druga HNL champions NK Inter Zaprešić, and he joined them in the summer of 2015, following their promotion to the Prva HNL.

The start of the season saw him as a back-up for the young Josip Filipović, and he made his Prva HNL debut in the 4th round of the 2015–16 season as a starter in the 8 August 2015 away goalless draw with Istra 1961. After establishing himself as a first-team regular, he scored his first Prva HNL goal in the 13th round, in a 1–1 draw with Split, scoring the leading goal in the 78th minute of the match.

In August 2017, he moved to the second-tier Russian National Football League club Orenburg. The club was promoted to the Russian Premier League for the 2018–19 season.

On 29 June 2019, he signed a 4-year contract with another Russian team Rubin Kazan. Shortly after signing, he suffered an injury and did not make any appearances for Rubin in the 2019–20 season.

On 3 September 2021, Begić joined Krylia Sovetov Samara on loan for the 2021–22 season. Begić had started each of Rubin's first seven matches in all competitions, but the introduction of Montassar Talbi to the squad left him expendable. On 2 February 2022, Rubin terminated the loan early. On 7 March 2022, FIFA announced that foreign players in Russia would be able to unilaterally suspend their contracts with their clubs until 30 June 2022 and sign with a club outside of Russia until the same date. On 26 March 2022, Begić suspended his contract with Rubin under those regulations.

On 8 September 2022, Begić signed with Ural Yekaterinburg in the Russian Premier League. On 19 January 2024, he extended his contract with Ural.

== Career statistics ==
As of match played 23 May 2026

Appearances and goals by club, season and competition
| Club | Season | League | | | Cup | | Continental | | Other | | Total | |
| Club | Season | Division | Apps | Goals | Apps | Goals | Apps | Goals | Apps | Goals | Apps | Goals |
|---|---|---|---|---|---|---|---|---|---|---|---|---|
| Rudeš | 2013–14 | 2. HNL | 6 | 0 | — | | — | | — | | 6 | 0 |
| Rudeš | 2014–15 | 2. HNL | 23 | 3 | — | | — | | — | | 23 | 3 |
| Rudeš | Total | | 29 | 3 | 0 | 0 | 0 | 0 | 0 | 0 | 29 | 3 |
| Inter Zaprešić | 2015–16 | 1. HNL | 18 | 1 | 2 | 0 | — | | — | | 20 | 1 |
| Inter Zaprešić | 2016–17 | 1. HNL | 21 | 0 | 1 | 0 | — | | — | | 22 | 0 |
| Inter Zaprešić | 2017–18 | 1. HNL | 0 | 0 | — | | — | | — | | 0 | 0 |
| Inter Zaprešić | Total | | 39 | 1 | 3 | 0 | 0 | 0 | 0 | 0 | 42 | 1 |
| Orenburg | 2017–18 | Russian First League | 28 | 2 | 2 | 0 | — | | — | | 30 | 2 |
| Orenburg | 2018–19 | Russian Premier League | 23 | 2 | 3 | 1 | — | | — | | 26 | 3 |
| Orenburg | Total | | 51 | 4 | 5 | 1 | 0 | 0 | 0 | 0 | 56 | 5 |
| Rubin Kazan | 2019–20 | Russian Premier League | 0 | 0 | 0 | 0 | — | | — | | 0 | 0 |
| Rubin Kazan | 2020–21 | Russian Premier League | 18 | 0 | 2 | 1 | — | | — | | 20 | 1 |
| Rubin Kazan | 2021–22 | Russian Premier League | 9 | 0 | 1 | 0 | 2 (Note: Appearances in the UEFA Europa Conference League) | 0 | — | | 12 | 0 |
| Rubin Kazan | Total | | 27 | 0 | 3 | 1 | 2 | 0 | 0 | 0 | 32 | 1 |
| Krylia Sovetov Samara | 2021–22 | Russian Premier League | 10 | 1 | 1 | 0 | — | | — | | 11 | 1 |
| Ural Yekaterinburg | 2022–23 | Russian Premier League | 15 | 0 | 8 | 0 | — | | — | | 23 | 0 |
| Ural Yekaterinburg | 2023–24 | Russian Premier League | 26 | 5 | 4 | 0 | — | | 2 (Note: Appearances in relegation play-offs) | 2 | 32 | 7 |
| Ural Yekaterinburg | 2024–25 | Russian First League | 28 | 1 | 2 | 0 | — | | 2 (Note: Appearances in promotion play-offs) | 0 | 32 | 1 |
| Ural Yekaterinburg | 2025–26 | Russian First League | 31 | 4 | 2 | 0 | — | | 2 | 0 | 35 | 4 |
| Ural Yekaterinburg | Total | | 100 | 10 | 16 | 0 | 0 | 0 | 6 | 2 | 122 | 12 |
| Career total | | | 256 | 19 | 28 | 2 | 2 | 0 | 6 | 2 | 292 | 23 |
