= Daniil Krivoruchko =

Russian footballer

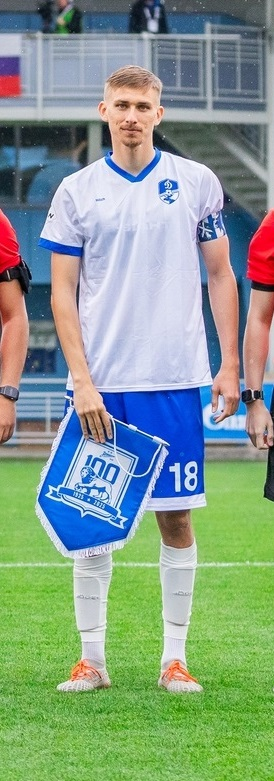
- Krivoruchko with Dynamo Vologda in 2025

Personal information
- Full name: Daniil Olegovich Krivoruchko
- Date of birth: 24 March 1998 (age 28)
- Place of birth: Orenburg, Russia
- Height: 1.93 m (6 ft 4 in)
- Position: Centre back

Team information
- Current team: FC Dynamo Vologda
- Number: 18

Youth career
- –2013: FC Gazovik Orenburg
- 2013–2015: Konoplyov football academy
- 2015–2017: FC Orenburg

Senior career*
Years	Team	Apps	(Gls)
2017–2021	FC Orenburg	2	(0)
2017–2018	→ FC Orenburg-2	21	(1)
2019	→ FC Nosta Novotroitsk (loan)	10	(1)
2019–2020	→ FC KAMAZ Naberezhnye Chelny (loan)	17	(1)
2020	→ FC KAMAZ Naberezhnye Chelny (loan)	7	(1)
2021	→ FC Tyumen (loan)	13	(1)
2021–2022	FC Tyumen	19	(3)
2022–2023	FC Novosibirsk	17	(2)
2023	FC Spartak Tambov	11	(0)
2024–	FC Dynamo Vologda	82	(10)
- * Club domestic league appearances and goals as of 1 November 2026

Daniil Olegovich Krivoruchko (Russian: Даниил Олегович Криворучко; born 24 March 1998) is a Russian football player who plays for FC Dynamo Vologda.

== Club career ==
He made his debut in the Russian Professional Football League for FC Orenburg-2 on 27 July 2017 in a game against FC Chelyabinsk.

He made his debut for the main squad of FC Orenburg on 25 September 2018 in a Russian Cup game against FC Dynamo Barnaul. He made his Russian Premier League debut for Orenburg on 5 July 2020 in a game against FC Rubin Kazan, replacing Žiga Škoflek in the 81st minute. Orenburg was relegated at the end of the 2019–20 season, and Krivoruchko returned on a second loan to FC KAMAZ Naberezhnye Chelny.
