= FC Yenisey-2 Krasnoyarsk =

Russian football team based in Krasnoyarsk

- Full name: Football Club Yenisey-2 Krasnoyarsk
- Founded: 1992
- Ground: Football Arena Yenisey
- Capacity: 3,000
- Chairman: Dmitry Fedoseyev
- Manager: Aleksandr Tarkhanov
- League: Russian Second League, Division B, Group 2
- 2026: 13th
- Website: фк-енисей.рф

FC Yenisey-2 Krasnoyarsk (Russian: ФК «Енисей» (Красноярск)) is a Russian football team based in Krasnoyarsk in Krasnoyarsk Krai. It is the reserves team for FC Yenisey Krasnoyarsk. It played on amateur levels throughout its existence, before getting licensed for the third-tier Russian Second League for the 2021–22 season.

== Current squad ==
As of 11 September 2026, according to the Second League website.

Note: Flags indicate national team as defined under FIFA eligibility rules; some limited exceptions apply. Players may hold more than one non-FIFA nationality.

No.	Pos.	Nation	Player
3	DF	RUS	Yan Tses
8	FW	RUS	Aleksandr Kanaplin
18	MF	RUS	Aleksandr Nadolsky
36	FW	RUS	Vladislav Lutashev
39	GK	RUS	Andrey Sorokin
42	DF	RUS	Mikhail Tsitrikov
45	FW	RUS	Aleksandr Shuvalov
51	MF	RUS	Dmitry Livanov
53	GK	RUS	Vladimir Shavkunov
54	MF	RUS	Yevgeny Gololobov
55	DF	RUS	Nikita Bogatyryov
56	GK	RUS	Igor Yepifantsev
57	MF	RUS	Yegor Shupyakov
58	DF	RUS	Albert Pokrovsky
59	DF	RUS	Andrey Ostrovsky
61	FW	RUS	Maksim Stepin
62	MF	RUS	Vladislav Kravtsov

No.	Pos.	Nation	Player
64	MF	RUS	Arseny Shchegolev
65	DF	RUS	Artyom Kolesov
66	DF	RUS	Zakhar Terpugov
67	DF	RUS	Denis Borzenkov
68	DF	RUS	Matvey Dmitruk
69	FW	RUS	Ivan Lapitsky
71	MF	RUS	Nazar Terpugov
73	FW	RUS	Daniil Valkov
76	DF	RUS	Semyon Musayev
79	GK	RUS	Ruslan Yunusov
83	DF	RUS	Danil Ambrosenok
84	MF	RUS	Ilya Maryasov
88	MF	RUS	Aleksandr Yegorov
92	MF	RUS	Aleksandr Gubanov
96	DF	RUS	Rodion Kazakov
97	MF	RUS	Vladislav Skavysh
99	GK	RUS	Rodion Konstantinov
