= Gazovik Stadium (Orenburg) =

Multi-purpose stadium in Orenburg, Russia

Coordinates: 51.78505°N 55.22116°E

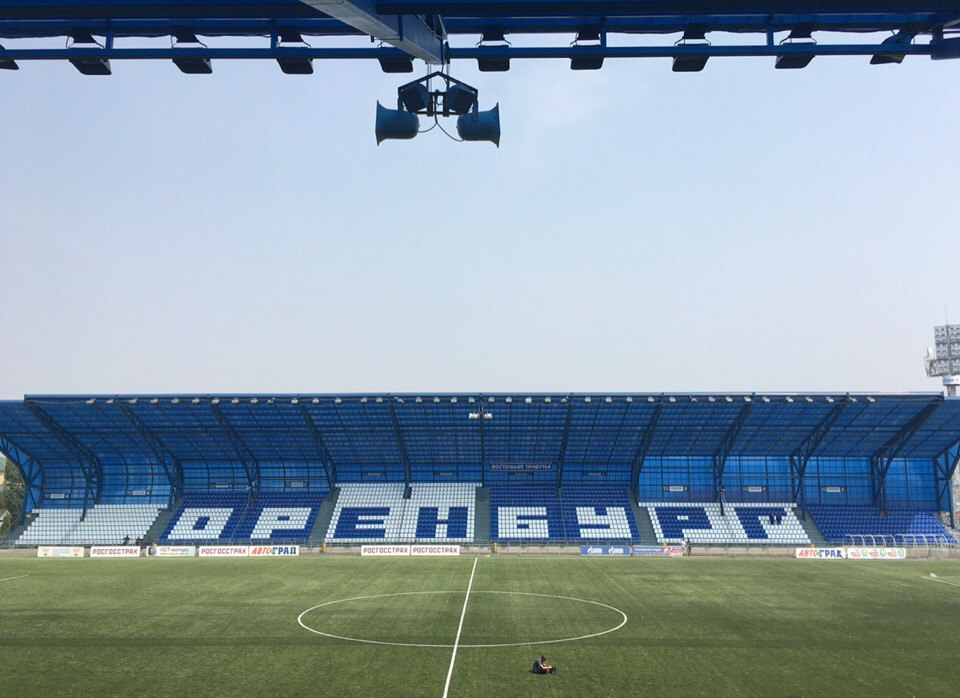
- Interactive map of Gazovik Stadium
- Location: Orenburg, Russia
- Capacity: 10,046 (Russian Premier League)
- Surface: Artificial turf

Construction
- Built: 2002
- Expanded: 2016, 2022

Tenant
- FC Orenburg (2002–present)

Gazovik Stadium is a multi-purpose stadium in Orenburg, Russia. It is currently used mostly for football matches and is the home stadium of FC Orenburg. The stadium holds 10,046 people, all seated.
