= Luka Đorđević =

Montenegrin footballer

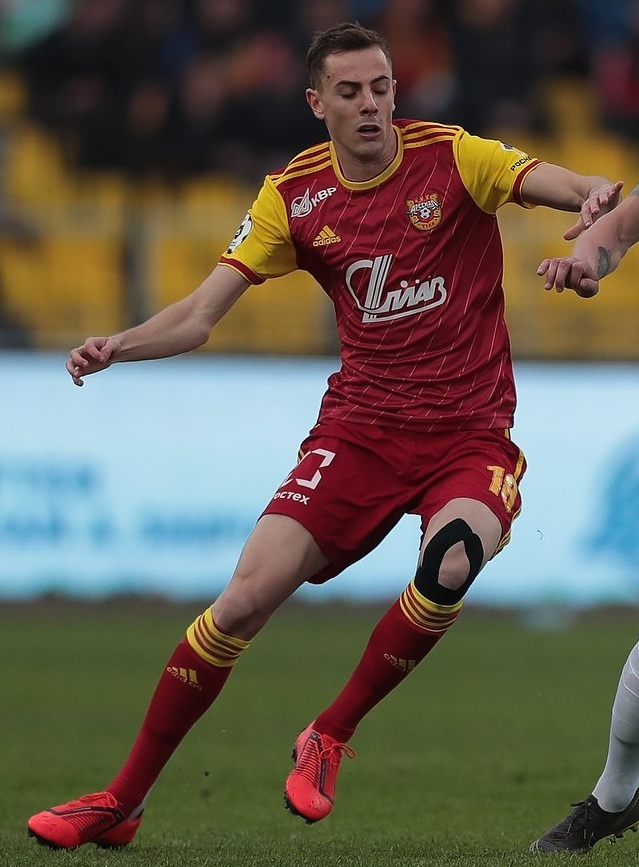
- Đorđević with Arsenal Tula in 2019

Personal information
- Date of birth: 9 July 1994 (age 32)
- Place of birth: Budva, FR Yugoslavia
- Height: 1.85 m (6 ft 1 in)
- Position: Forward

Team information
- Current team: BATE Borisov
- Number: 19

Youth career
- Mogren

Senior career*
| Years | Team | Apps | (Gls) |
| 2011–2012 | Mogren | 26 | (10) |
| 2012–2019 | Zenit Saint Petersburg | 18 | (1) |
| 2013–2014 | → Twente (loan) | 14 | (0) |
| 2013–2014 | → Jong Twente (loan) | 5 | (1) |
| 2014–2015 | → Sampdoria (loan) | 3 | (0) |
| 2015 | → Zenit-2 Saint Petersburg | 2 | (0) |
| 2015–2016 | → Ponferradina (loan) | 24 | (3) |
| 2017–2019 | → Arsenal Tula (loan) | 45 | (14) |
| 2019–2021 | Lokomotiv Moscow | 4 | (0) |
| 2020–2021 | → Arsenal Tula (loan) | 14 | (2) |
| 2021–2022 | Vejle | 20 | (5) |
| 2022–2023 | Sochi | 24 | (4) |
| 2024 | Abha | 7 | (0) |
| 2024–2025 | Karmiotissa | 15 | (1) |
| 2025 | Sogdiana | 2 | (0) |
| 2026– | BATE Borisov | 2 | (0) |

International career^{‡}
| 2011–2012 | Montenegro U19 | 10 | (3) |
| 2011–2016 | Montenegro U21 | 21 | (6) |
| 2012– | Montenegro | 11 | (1) |
- * Club domestic league appearances and goals as of 23 August 2026 ‡ National team caps and goals as of 20 November 2018

Luka Đorđević (Montenegrin: Лукa Ђорђевић, pronounced [lûːka dʑǒːrdʑeʋitɕ]; born 9 July 1994) is a Montenegrin professional footballer who plays as a forward for Belarusian Premier League club BATE Borisov.

== Club career ==
=== Zenit ===
On 11 August 2012, Đorđević made his first appearance for Zenit when he came in the 83rd minute as a substitute in the club's 5–0 win against Spartak Moskva.

==== Loan to Twente ====
Đorđević went on a one-season loan from Zenit to Twente in August 2013. On 11 January 2014, he scored his first goal for Twente in a friendly match against VfL Osnabrück.

==== Loan to Arsenal Tula ====
After spending the 2017–18 season on loan at FC Arsenal Tula, he rejoined Arsenal for another season-long loan on 4 August 2018. On 21 October 2018, Đorđević assisted teammate Reziuan Mirzov for the winning goal in a 3–2 upset against favorites Spartak Moscow. On 27 October 2018, he scored a goal using a mid-air heel which a journalist called a "scorpion" in a 1–1 tie with Orenburg.

=== Lokomotiv Moscow ===
On 12 August 2019, he signed with FC Lokomotiv Moscow. On 8 June 2021, his contract with Lokomotiv was terminated by mutual consent.

==== Arsenal Tula ====
On 14 October 2020, he returned to FC Arsenal Tula on loan until the end of the 2020–21 season.

=== Vejle ===
On 5 September 2021, he joined Danish club Vejle BK. After 6 goals in 26 games, Vejle confirmed in May 2022, that Đorđević would leave the club, as his contract would expire.

=== Sochi ===
On 19 September 2022, Đorđević returned to Russia and signed with Sochi. Đorđević extended his contract with Sochi on 24 June 2023. On 30 January 2024, Đorđević left Sochi by mutual consent.

=== Abha ===
On 11 February 2024, Đorđević signed with Abha in Saudi Arabia until the end of the season.

=== Karmiotissa ===
On 11 September 2024, Đorđević joined Cypriot First Division club Karmiotissa.

== International career ==
In August 2012 he participated in the Valeri Lobanovsky Memorial Tournament 2012, where his team lost in the final to Slovakia on penalties and took home silver medals. Đorđević received his first call-up for the Montenegro national football team on 27 August 2012 for matches against Poland and San Marino on September 7 and 11 respectively. He scored on his debut against San Marino on 11 September 2012. As of August 2020, he has earned a total of 11 caps, scoring 1 goal.

== Career statistics ==
=== Club ===
As of 12 November 2023

| Club | Season | League | | | Cup | | Continental | | Other | | Total | |
| Club | Season | Division | Apps | Goals | Apps | Goals | Apps | Goals | Apps | Goals | Apps | Goals |
|---|---|---|---|---|---|---|---|---|---|---|---|---|
| Mogren | 2010–11 | Montenegrin First League | 2 | 0 | 0 | 0 | 0 | 0 | – | | 2 | 0 |
| Mogren | 2011–12 | Montenegrin First League | 24 | 10 | 2 | 0 | 1 | 0 | – | | 27 | 10 |
| Mogren | Total | | 26 | 10 | 2 | 0 | 1 | 0 | 0 | 0 | 29 | 10 |
| Zenit St. Petersburg | 2012–13 | Russian Premier League | 7 | 0 | 2 | 0 | 1 | 0 | – | | 10 | 0 |
| Zenit St. Petersburg | 2013–14 | Russian Premier League | 1 | 0 | – | | 0 | 0 | – | | 1 | 0 |
| Zenit St. Petersburg | 2016–17 | Russian Premier League | 10 | 1 | 1 | 1 | 6 | 1 | 1 (Note: Appearances in the Russian Super Cup) | 0 | 18 | 3 |
| Zenit St. Petersburg | 2019–20 | Russian Premier League | 0 | 0 | – | | – | | 1 | 0 | 1 | 0 |
| Zenit St. Petersburg | Total | | 18 | 1 | 3 | 1 | 7 | 1 | 2 | 0 | 30 | 3 |
| Twente | 2013–14 | Eredivisie | 14 | 0 | 1 | 0 | – | | – | | 15 | 0 |
| Jong Twente | 2013–14 | Eerste Divisie | 5 | 1 | – | | – | | – | | 5 | 1 |
| Sampdoria | 2014–15 | Serie A | 3 | 0 | 2 | 0 | – | | – | | 5 | 0 |
| Zenit-2 St. Petersburg | 2015–16 | Russian First League | 2 | 0 | – | | – | | – | | 2 | 0 |
| Ponferradina | 2015–16 | Segunda División | 24 | 3 | 2 | 1 | – | | – | | 26 | 4 |
| Arsenal Tula | 2017–18 | Russian Premier League | 22 | 7 | 1 | 0 | – | | – | | 23 | 7 |
| Arsenal Tula | 2018–19 | Russian Premier League | 23 | 7 | 4 | 2 | – | | – | | 27 | 9 |
| Lokomotiv Moscow | 2019–20 | Russian Premier League | 4 | 0 | 1 | 0 | 0 | 0 | – | | 5 | 0 |
| Lokomotiv Moscow | 2020–21 | Russian Premier League | 0 | 0 | – | | – | | – | | 0 | 0 |
| Lokomotiv Moscow | Total | | 4 | 0 | 1 | 0 | 0 | 0 | 0 | 0 | 5 | 0 |
| Arsenal Tula | 2020–21 | Russian Premier League | 14 | 2 | 0 | 0 | – | | – | | 14 | 2 |
| Arsenal Tula | Total | | 59 | 16 | 5 | 2 | 0 | 0 | 0 | 0 | 64 | 18 |
| Vejle | 2021–22 | Danish Superliga | 20 | 5 | 6 | 1 | – | | – | | 26 | 6 |
| Sochi | 2022–23 | Russian Premier League | 13 | 2 | 4 | 0 | – | | – | | 17 | 2 |
| Sochi | 2023–24 | Russian Premier League | 11 | 2 | 3 | 0 | – | | – | | 14 | 2 |
| Sochi | Total | | 24 | 4 | 7 | 0 | – | | – | | 31 | 4 |
| Career total | | | 199 | 40 | 29 | 5 | 8 | 1 | 2 | 0 | 238 | 46 |

=== International ===
As of 20 November 2018

Montenegro
| Year | Apps | Goals |
|---|---|---|
| 2012 | 2 | 1 |
| 2014 | 2 | 0 |
| 2017 | 3 | 0 |
| 2018 | 4 | 0 |
| Total | 11 | 1 |

Scores and results list Montenegro's goal tally first, score column indicates score after each Ðorđević goal.

List of international goals scored by Luka Ðorđević
| No. | Date | Venue | Opponent | Score | Result | Competition |
|---|---|---|---|---|---|---|
| 1 | 11 September 2012 | Stadio Olimpico, Serravalle, San Marino | San Marino | 1–0 | 6–0 | 2014 FIFA World Cup qualification |

== Honors ==
Mogren

- Montenegrin First League: 2010–11

Zenit Saint Petersburg

- Russian Super Cup: 2016
