= FC Yenisey Krasnoyarsk =

Russian football club

Yenisey
- Full name: Futbolny Klub Yenisey Krasnoyarsk
- Nicknames: Lvy (The Lions); Krasno-sinie (The red-blues)
- Founded: 1937; 89 years ago
- Ground: Central Stadium, Krasnoyarsk
- Capacity: 15,000
- Chairman: Dmitry Fedoseyev
- Manager: Andrey Tikhonov
- League: Russian First League
- 2025–26: 6th of 18
Home colours	Away colours

FK Yenisey Krasnoyarsk (ФК Енисей Красноярск) is a Russian football club based in Krasnoyarsk, in Krasnoyarsk Krai. The club plays in the Russian First League.

== History ==
The club was founded in 1937 as Lokomotiv Krasnoyarsk and spent one season in Class D of the Soviet league. In 1957 the club was re-formed and entered the Far East zone of Class B. In 1968 Lokomotiv was renamed Rassvet and, in 1970, Avtomobilist. In 1991 it became Metallurg, a title it held until February 2010 when it was renamed Metallurg-Yenisey (formally, Metallurg was excluded from the league and a new independent club Metallurg-Yenisey was admitted into the league). In 2011, the club was renamed to Yenisey. The club is named after the Yenisei river, on which Krasnoyarsk is located.

Yenisey (or their predecessors) never played in the Soviet Top League or Russian Premier League until 2018. Their best result in Soviet League was a 2nd position in Group 7 of Class B in 1959, while their best result in Russian history is the 3rd position in Russian National Football League in 2016–17 and 2017–18. Since the end of the Soviet Union, the club has suffered relegation to the Second Division on five occasions, most recently in 2006. In the 2015–16 season, Yenisey took 16th spot in the FNL and should have been relegated, but one of the third-tier Russian Professional Football League zone winners, FC Smena Komsomolsk-na-Amure, refused to be promoted due to lack of financing, and Yenisey stayed in the FNL. At the end of the 2016–17 season, Yenisey reached the Russian Premier League promotion play-offs, but lost to FC Arsenal Tula on away goals rule (2–1 at home, 0–1 away) and stayed in the FNL. Despite spending a portion of the next 2017–18 season in the top-two direct-promotion spot, by the end of the season Yenisey dropped into 3rd position and qualified for promotion play-offs again. They defeated FC Anzhi Makhachkala 6–4 on aggregate in the promotion play-offs and were promoted to the Russian Premier League for the 2018–19 season for the first time in the team's history.

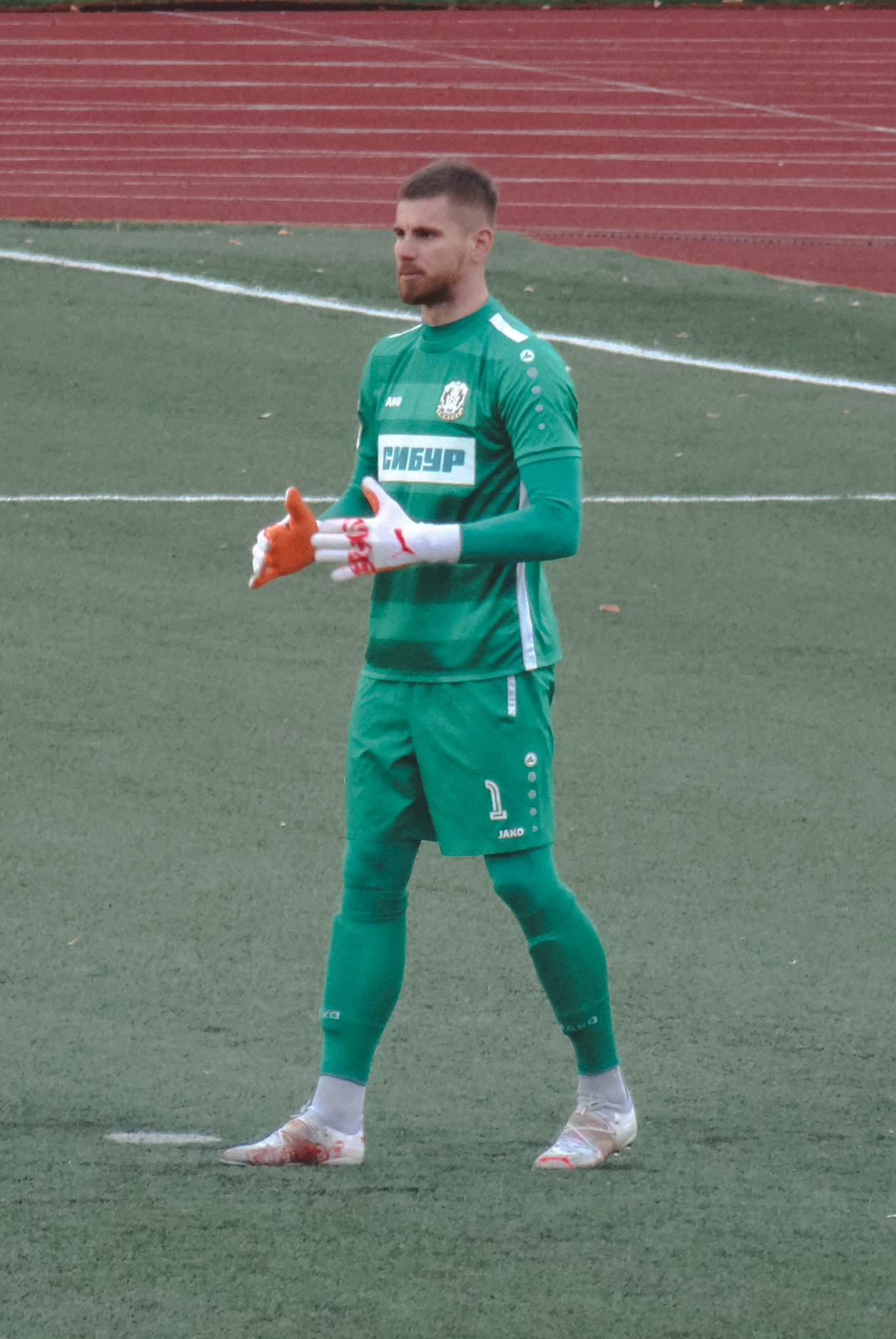
Stanislav Antipin joined FC Yenisey in 2022

They were relegated back to the second tier after one year in the Premier League.

Yenisey ended the 2022–23 season in 4th place in the First League and qualified for the promotion play-offs. Yenisey lost 0–3 on aggregate in the playoffs to Fakel Voronezh and remained in the First League.

=== Domestic history ===
Season	League									Russian Cup	Top goalscorer		Manager
Season	Div.	Pos.	Pl.	W	D	L	GS	GA	P	Russian Cup	Name	League	Manager
2007	3rd	6th	30	13	7	20	45	40	46	Round of 32	(Russia) Aleksei Bazanov	9	
2008	3rd	6th	27	9	7	11	38	34	34	Round of 16	(Russia) Stanislav Goncharov	13	
2009	3rd	3rd	27	15	5	7	51	27	50	Fourth round	(Russia) Stanislav Goncharov	10	
2010	2nd	11th	38	15	8	15	37	39	53	Fourth round	(Russia) Aleksei Bazanov	14	
2011–12	2nd	10th	48	17	15	16	53	53	66	Second round Round of 32	(Russia) Aleksei Bazanov	13	
2012–13	2nd	10th	32	9	12	11	30	31	39	Quarter-finals	(Russia) Sergei Pyatikopov (Russia) Aleksei Bazanov	7	
2013–14	2nd	13th	36	12	9	15	40	47	45	Fourth round	(Argentina) Juan Lescano	7	
2014–15	2nd	8th	34	11	9	14	39	42	42	Round of 32	(Russia) Ilya Gultyayev	5	
2015–16	2nd	16th	38	12	8	18	36	49	44	Round of 32	(Argentina) Juan Lescano	7	
2016–17	2nd	3rd	38	19	6	13	54	42	63	Round of 16	(Russia) Sergey Samodin	10	
2017–18	2nd	3rd	38	25	6	7	68	32	81	Round of 16	(Russia) Andrei Kozlov	15	(Russia) Dmitri Alenichev
2018–19	1st	16th	30	4	8	18	24	55	20	Round of 16	(Russia) Mikhail Kostyukov	4	(Russia) Dmitri Alenichev
2019–20	2nd	14th	27	7	7	13	23	40	28	Round of 32	(Russia) Andrei Kozlov	15	(Russia) Alexander Alekseev (Russia) Yuri Gazzaev
2020–21	2nd	10th	42	19	6	17	52	54	63	Round of 32	(Argentina) Juan Lescano	9	(Russia) Aleksandr Tarkhanov (Russia) Aleksandr Alfyorov
2021–22	2nd	5th	38	19	6	13	58	55	63	Semifinal			
2022–23	2nd	4th	34	13	15	6	43	35	54	Qualifying Round 5	(Russia) Nikita Glushkov	9	
2023–24	2nd	6th	34	15	6	13	55	40	51	Qualifying Round 5	(Russia) Aleksandr Lomakin	13	
2024–25	2nd	8th	34	14	7	13	36	39	49	Qualifying Round 4	(Russia) Aleksandr Lomakin	8	

== Current squad ==
As of 11 September 2026, according to the Official First League website. Note: Flags indicate national team as defined under FIFA eligibility rules; some limited exceptions apply. Players may hold more than one non-FIFA nationality.

No.	Pos.	Nation	Player
1	GK	RUS	Mikhail Oparin
3	DF	RUS	Yan Tses
6	MF	RUS	Amir Batyrev
7	MF	RUS	Andrea Chukanov
8	MF	RUS	Aleksandr Kanaplin
9	FW	RUS	Marat Tlekhugov
10	DF	AZE	Azer Aliyev
15	DF	RUS	Maksim Balakhonov (on loan from Dynamo Moscow)
17	MF	RUS	David Kokoyev
18	MF	RUS	Aleksandr Nadolsky
21	MF	RUS	Yegor Ivanov
22	DF	ARM	Artyom Gyurdzhan
23	GK	RUS	Stanislav Antipin

No.	Pos.	Nation	Player
25	DF	RUS	Nikita Shershov
27	FW	SRB	Luka Ratković
33	DF	RUS	Aleksandr Maslovsky
39	GK	RUS	Andrey Sorokin
55	DF	RUS	Nikita Bogatyryov
57	DF	RUS	Yegor Shupyakov
62	MF	RUS	Vladislav Kravtsov
75	FW	RUS	Andrey Okladnikov
77	MF	RUS	Rostislav Ogiyenko
81	MF	BLR	Rodion Pechura
87	MF	RUS	Andrey Mazurin
90	MF	RUS	Aleksandr Lomakin
99	GK	RUS	Rodion Konstantinov

=== Out on loan ===
Note: Flags indicate national team as defined under FIFA eligibility rules; some limited exceptions apply. Players may hold more than one non-FIFA nationality.

No. / Pos. / Nation / Player; — / MF / CMR / Olivier Kenfack (at Leningradets until 30 June 2027)	No. / Pos. / Nation / Player; — / MF / RUS / Artyom Nadolsky (at Kaluga until 31 December 2026)

== Notable players ==
Had international caps for their respective countries. Players whose name is listed in bold represented their countries while playing for Yenisey.

Russia/USSR

- (Russia) Mingiyan Beveyev
- (Russia) Nikita Chernov
- (Russia) Lyubomir Kantonistov
- (Soviet Union) Oleg Romantsev
- (Russia) Roman Sharonov
- (Russia) Aleksandr Sobolev
- (Soviet Union) Aleksandr Tarkhanov
- (Soviet Union) (Russia) Vladimir Tatarchuk
- (Soviet Union) Ivan Varlamov

Former USSR countries

- (Armenia) Barsegh Kirakosyan
- (Armenia) **Artur Sarkisov**
- (Armenia) David Yurchenko
- (Azerbaijan) Aleksey Isayev
- (Belarus) Vladimir Putrash
- (Belarus) Gennady Tumilovich
- (Kazakhstan) **Valeri Korobkin**
- (Kazakhstan) Almir Mukhutdinov
- (Kyrgyzstan) **Valery Kichin**
- (Latvia) **Edgars Gauračs**
- (Latvia) Konstantīns Igošins
- (Latvia) **Oļegs Laizāns**
- (Latvia) Valentīns Lobaņovs
- (Moldova) **Serghei Alexeev**
- (Moldova) Victor Bulat
- (Moldova) Valeriu Ciupercă
- (Turkmenistan) Wladimir Baýramow
- (Ukraine) Dmytro Tyapushkin
- (Ukraine) Ihor Zhabchenko

Europe

- (Albania) **Enis Gavazaj**
- (Bulgaria) **Petar Zanev**

Africa

- (Nigeria) Fegor Ogude

== Coaching staff ==
Position	Name
Manager	Artyom Gorlov
Assistant manager	Konstantin Zaitsev
First-team coach	Plenkin Denis Vladimirovich
Goalkeeping coach	Eduard Steinbrecher
Fitness coach	Suleimanov Artur Arturovich
Analyst	Sergey Klushantsev
Doctor	Vladimir Fomin
Rehabilitation Specialist	Michael Romanov
Masseur	Vadim Zhdanov
Masseur	Shevtsov Denis Igorevich
Team Administrator	Suleimanov Artur Arturovich
Team Administrator	Yudt Dmitry Evgenievich
Team Leader	Butan Evgenii
