= Danilovich =

Origin
- Languages: Belarusian, Russian, Ukrainian
- Meaning: the son of Daniil
- Region of origin: Belarus, Russia, Ukraine

Other names
- Variant form: Danilovych
- Cognates: Danilov, Danilin

Danilovich (Cyrillic: Данило́вич, Даніловіч) is a surname of Slavic origin.

A transliteration of the Ruthenian/Russian/Belarusian form is Danilovich, Ukrainian: Danilovych.

Also Danilovich (Cyrillic: Дани́лович, Данілавіч) and Danilovna are Eastern Slavic patronymics.

The surname should not be confused with the patronymics. Both literally mean the same, "son of Daniil (Danila, Danil)", but in the pronunciation of the surname the stress syllable is penultimate, while in the patronymic the second syllable is stressed.

The same surname in Polish is Danilowicz and in Serbian is Danilović.

== People with the surname ==
The surname may refer to:

- Jean Danilovich (born 1946), American amateur tennis player
- John J. Danilovich (born 1950), American business executive
- Ruvik Danilovich (born 1971), Israeli politician

== People with the patronymic but no surname ==
- Lev Danylovych (c. 1228 – 1301), Leo I of Galicia, king of Ruthenia
- Roman Danylovych (c. 1230 – 1261), Prince of Black Ruthenia
- Ivan I Danilovich (1288 – c. 1340), Prince of Moscow
