= Daniil =

Russian masculine given name

- Gender: Male
- Language: Russian

Origin
- Derivation: Daniel
- Region of origin: Russia

Daniil (Russian: Даниил) is a Russian masculine given name.

Daniil (Greek: Δανιήλ) can also be a surname.

Notable people with the name include:

== Given name ==
=== Arts and literature ===
- Daniil Andreyev (1906–1959), Russian writer, poet, and Christian mystic
- Daniil Atnilov (1913–1968), Mountain Jewish poet
- Daniil Chyorny (c. 1360–1430), Russian icon painter
- Daniil Granin (1919–2017), Russian writer
- Daniil Kashin (1769–1841), Russian composer, pianist, conductor, and folk-song collector
- Daniil Kharms (1905–1942), Russian writer and poet
- Daniil Khrabrovitsky (1923–1980), Russian scriptwriter and film director
- Daniil Kozlov (born 1997), Belarusian singer
- Daniil Mordovtsev (1830–1905), Russian writer and historian
- Daniil Moscopolites (1754–1825), Aromanian scholar
- Daniil Shafran (1923–1997), Russian cellist
- Daniil Simkin (born 1987), Russian ballet dancer
- Daniil Spivakovsky (born 1969), Russian actor
- Daniil Strakhov (born 1976), Russian actor
- Daniil Trifonov (born 1991), Russian pianist
- Daniil Vorobyov (born 1981), Russian actor

=== Religion ===
- Daniil of Bulgaria (born 1972), Bulgarian Patriarch
- Daniil Sihastrul (fl. 1400–1482), saint of the Romanian Orthodox Church
- Daniil Sysoev (1974–2009), Russian Orthodox priest

=== Sports ===
- Daniil Aldoshkin (born 2001), Russian speed skater
- Daniil Apalkov (born 1992), Russian ice hockey player
- Daniil Barantsev (born 1982), Russian–American ice dancer
- Daniil Davydov (born 1989), Russian futsal forward
- Daniil Eybog (born 1997), Russo-Uzbek speed skater
- Daniil Fominykh (born 1998), Kazakh cyclist
- Daniil Gleikhengauz (born 1991), Russian figure skater
- Daniil Glinka (born 2000), Estonian tennis player
- Daniil Golubev (born 2001), Russian tennis player
- Daniil Goriachev (born 1995), Russian curler
- Daniil Ilyin (born 1995), Russian ice hockey player
- Daniil Isayev (born 2000), Russian ice hockey player
- Daniil Ivanov (born 1986), Russian speedway rider
- Daniil Karpyuk, Russian ice hockey player
- Daniil Krutskikh (born 2000), Russian sailor
- Daniil Kvyat (born 1994), Russian racecar driver
- Daniil Markov, full name of Danny Markov (born 1976), Russian ice hockey player
- Daniil Markov (swimmer) (born 2000), Russian swimmer
- Daniil Medvedev (born 1996), Russian tennis player
- Daniil Move (born 1985), Russian racecar driver
- Daniil Ostapenkov (born 2003), Belarusian tennis player
- Daniil Parkman (born 1999), Russian pair skater
- Daniil Pasynkov (born 1994), Russian swimmer
- Daniil Samsonov (born 2005), Russian figure skater
- Daniil Sapljoshin (born 1970), Estonian kickboxer
- Daniil Shishkaryov (born 1988), Russian handball player
- Daniil Smirnov, Russian paralympic swimmer
- Daniil Sobchenko (1991–2011), Russian ice hockey player and plane crash victim
- Daniil Steptšenko (born 1986), Estonian biathlete
- Daniil Tarasov (ice hockey, born 1991), Russian ice hockey player
- Daniil Tarasov (ice hockey, born 1999), Russian ice hockey player
- Daniil Tsyplakov (born 1992), Russian high jumper
- Daniil Zharkov (born 1994), Russian ice hockey player
- Daniil Zhuravlyov (born 2000), Russian ice hockey player

==== Association football ====
- Daniil Agureyev (born 1999), Russian football forward
- Daniil Avdyushkin (born 1993), Russian football goalkeeper
- Daniil Bolshunov (born 1997), Russian football midfielder
- Daniil Chalov (born 1994), Russian football defender
- Daniil Chernyakov (born 2001), Russian football midfielder
- Daniil Chertov (born 1990), Russian footballer
- Daniil Denisov (born 2002), Russian football right back
- Daniil Dushevskiy (born 2004), Belarusian football midfielder
- Daniil Fomin (born 1997), Russian football midfielder
- Daniil Gavilovskiy (born 1990), Russian footballer
- Daniil Gorovykh (born 1997), Russian football midfielder
- Daniil Gridnev (born 1986), Russian footballer
- Daniil Grigoryev (born 2002), Russian football midfielder
- Daniil Ivankov (born 1999), Russian football midfielder
- Daniil Kamlashev (born 2002), Russian football midfielder
- Daniil Khlusevich (born 2001), Russian football midfielder
- Daniil Khrypchuk (born 2003), Ukrainian football midfielder
- Daniil Khudyakov (born 2004), Russian football goalkeeper
- Daniil Kornyushin (born 2001), Russian football defender
- Daniil Kovalev (born 2001), Belarusian football midfielder
- Daniil Krivoruchko (born 1998), Russian football center back
- Daniil Kulikov (born 1998), Russian football midfielder
- Daniil Kuznetsov (born 2003), Russianfootballer
- Daniil Lesovoy (born 1998), Russian footballer
- Daniil Lopatin (born 2000), Russian football forward
- Daniil Makeyev (born 1998), Russian footballer
- Daniil Martovoy (born 2003), Russian football midfielder
- Daniil Maykov (born 1997), Russian football defender
- Daniil Miroshnikov (born 2000), Belarusian football center back
- Daniil Nikolayev (footballer, born 1991), Russian football forward
- Daniil Nikolayev (footballer, born 2002), Russian football midfielder
- Daniil Odoyevsky (born 2003), Russian footballer
- Daniil Pavlov (born 2002), Russian football center-forward
- Daniil Penchikov (born 1998), Russian footballer
- Daniil Petrunin (born 1999), Russian football defender
- Daniil Polyansky (born 2001), Russian football goalkeeper
- Daniil Ratnikov (born 1988), Estonian footballer
- Daniil Savichev (born 1994), Russian football midfielder
- Daniil Savin (born 2005), Ukrainian football right wing
- Daniil Shamkin (born 2002), Russian football midfielder
- Daniil Shantaly (born 2001), Russian football midfielder
- Daniil Shapko (born 2001), Belarusian football goalkeeper
- Daniil Silinsky (born 2000), Belarusian footballer
- Daniil Utkin (born 1999), Russian football midfielder
- Daniil Vigovskiy (born 2001), Russian football defender
- Daniil Yermolov (born 2000), Ukrainian football goalkeeper
- Daniil Zorin (born 2004), Russian football midfielder

=== Other ===
- Daniil of Moscow (1261–1303), Prince of Moscow
- Daniil Varfolomeevič Avdeev (1917–1944), Soviet partisan killed in WWII
- Daniil Barchenkov (1917–1953), Soviet flying ace
- Daniil Bessarabov (born 1976), Russian politician
- Daniil Chwolson (1819–1911), Russian-Jewish orientalist
- Daniil Dondurey (1947–2017), Soviet-born Israeli film critic
- Daniil Dubov (born 1996), Russian chess grandmaster
- Daniil Khvolson (1819–1911), Russian-Jewish Arabologist
- Daniil Konstantinov (born 1984), Russian opposition politician
- Daniil Lintchevski (born 1990), Russian chess grandmaster
- Daniil Lunts (1912–1977), Soviet intelligence officer
- Daniil Novomirskii (1882–1936), Ukrainian Jewish anarcho-syndicalist
- Daniil Ostrogski (fl. 1344–1366), Prince of Turaŭ, first Prince of Ostroh, founder of Ostrogski House
- Daniil Semyonov, birth name of Daniel Elmen (1885–1932), Chuvash politician
- Daniil Shchenya (fl. 1489–1519), Russian military leader
- Daniil Sulimov (1891–1937), Soviet Russian politician
- Daniil Volkovich (1900–1937), Belarusian politician and great purge victim
- Daniil Yegorov (born 1975), Russian statesman
- Daniil Yuffa (born 1997), Russo-Spanish chess grandmaster

== Surname ==
- Vasilios Daniil (1938–2026), Greek footballer and manager

== See also ==
- Profitis Daniil, Athens
- Danil
- Danylo
