= Danilo =

- Gender: Male

Origin
- Origin: Hebrew

Danilo is a given name, a variant of Daniel. Notable people with the name include:

== Athletes ==
=== Footballers ===
- Danilo (footballer, born 1979), Brazilian footballer Danilo de Andrade
- Danilo (footballer, born 1980), Brazilian footballer Danilo Moreira Serrano
- Danilo (footballer, born 1981), Brazilian footballer Danilo Aguiar Rocha
- Danilo (footballer, born 1984), Brazilian footballer Danilo Larangeira
- Danilo (footballer, born 1985), Brazilian footballer Marcos Danilo Padinha (1985–2016)
- Danilo (footballer, born 1986), Brazilian footballer Danilo Vitalino Pereira
- Danilo (footballer, born 1990), Belgian footballer Richard Danilo Maciel Sousa Campos
- Danilo (footballer, born April 1991), Brazilian footballer Danilo Lopes Cezario
- Danilo (footballer, born July 1991), Brazilian footballer Danilo Luiz da Silva
- Danilo (footballer, born 1999), Brazilian footballer Danilo Pereira da Silva
- Danilo (footballer, born 2001), Brazilian footballer Danilo dos Santos de Oliveira
- Danilo Aceval (born 1975), Paraguayan footballer
- Danilo Acosta (born 1997), Ecuadorian footballer
- Danilo Alves, several Brazilian footballers
- Danilo Alvim (1920–1996), Brazilian footballer
- Danilo Arboleda (born 1995), Colombian footballer
- Danilo Arrieta (born 1987), Chilean-Danish footballer
- Danilo Barbosa (born 1996), Brazilian footballer
- Danilo Barcelos (born 1991), Brazilian footballer
- Danilo Cintra (born 1985), Brazilian footballer
- Danilo Cirino (born 1986), Brazilian footballer
- Danilo Clementino (born 1982), naturalized Equatoguinean footballer
- Danilo Dias (born 1985), Brazilian footballer
- Danilo Pantić (born 1996), Serbian footballer
- Danilo Pereira (born 1991), Portuguese footballer
- Danilo Popivoda (born 1947), footballer, Yugoslavija
- Danilo Quipapá (born 1994), Brazilian footballer
- Danilo Silva (born 1986), Brazilian footballer
- Danilo Wiebe (born 1994), German footballer
- Danilinho (footballer, born 1985), Brazilian footballer Danilo Caçador (1985–2018)
- Danilinho (footballer, born 1987), Brazilian footballer Danilo Veron Bairros

=== Other athletes ===
- Danilo Anđušić (born 1991), Serbian basketball player
- Danilo Gallinari (born 1988), Italian basketball player
- Danilo Ikodinović (born 1976), Serbian water polo player

== Artists and entertainers ==
- Danilo Arona (active since 1994), Italian writer
- Danilo Bach (born 1944), American screenwriter and film producer
- Danilo Bertazzi (born 1966), Italian actor
- Danilo De Girolamo (1956–2012), Italian voice actor
- Danilo Donati (1926–2001), Italian costume designer
- Danilo Gentili (born 1979), Brazilian reporter and comedian
- Danilo Kiš (1935–1989), Yugoslav novelist
- Danilo Kocevski (1947–2020), Macedonian writer
- Danilo Lazović (1951–2006), Serbian actor
- Danilo Pennone (born 1963), Italian writer
- Danilo Pérez (born 1965), Panamanian jazz pianist and composer
- Danilo Šerbedžija (born 1971), Serbian film director
- Danilo Stojković (1934–2002), Serbian actor

== Politicians, government officials and revolutionaries ==
- Danilo Anderson (1966–2004), assassinated Venezuelan environmental state prosecutor
- Danilo Astori (1940–2023), Uruguayan politician
- Danilo Golubović (born 1963), Serbian politician
- Danilo Ilić (1891–1915), Serbian revolutionary
- Danilo Lim (1955–2021), Filipino army general and government administrator
- Danilo Medina (born 1951), President of the Dominican Republic (2012-2020)
- Danilo Fernandez (born 1966), Filipino politician, actor, and optometrist
- Danilo Suarez (born 1942), Filipino politician and former governor of Quezon

== Religious leaders ==
- Danilo I, Serbian Archbishop (fl. 1271–1272)
- Danilo I, Metropolitan of Cetinje (1670–1735)
- Danilo II (Archbishop of Serbs), primate of the Serbian Orthodox Church (1324–1337)
- Danilo II, Metropolitan of Montenegro, in office (1961–1990)
- Danilo III (patriarch) (c. 1350–1400), Patriarch of the Serbian Orthodox Church, writer and poet
- Danilo Ulep (born 1962), Filipino bishop of the Catholic Church.

== Other people ==
- Danilo I, Prince of Montenegro (1826–1860), Prince of Montenegro
- Danilo, Crown Prince of Montenegro (1871–1939), crown prince of Montenegro
- Danilo Atienza (active 1974–1989), Filipino pilot
- Danilo Blanuša (1903–1987), Yugoslav mathematician and physicist
- Danilo Concepcion (born 1958), Filipino lawyer and former president of the University of the Philippines
- Danilo Lacuna (1938–2023), Filipino lawyer, retired politician, and former vice mayor of Manila

== See also ==
- Danilo (disambiguation)
- Danylo (given name)
- Danillo, a given name
- Danilović, a surname
- Danilov (surname)
- Danilovsky (disambiguation)
- Danilovo
- Danilo culture, Neolithic archaeological culture of prehistoric Croatia
