= Danil =

Russian masculine given name

Danil (also spelled Danyl) is a Central Asian and Russian male given name meaning "God is my judge" and "The Creator's Gift" in certain dialects of the Turkic languages. It is a variant of the Russian name Daniil. A Tatar and Bashkir national name, it is derived from the combination of two words Dan, which means glorious, and Il, which means country.

Notable people with the given name include:

- Danil Akhatov (born 2003), Russian football forward
- Danil Anisimov (born 1978), Kazakh alpine skier
- Danil Ankudinov (born 2003), Kazakh football forward
- Danil Anosov (born 2005), Russian football midfielder
- Danil Artyukh (born 2003), Kazakh water polo player
- Danil Benedyk (born 2001), Russian football midfielder
- Danil Bugakov (born 1988), Uzbek swimmer
- Danil Burkenya (born 1978), Russian track and field athlete
- Danil Chaban (born 1974), Russian luger
- Danil Domdjoni (born 1985), Croatian karate fighter
- Danil Faizullin (born 1993), Russian ice hockey player
- Danil Glebov (born 1999), Russian football midfielder
- Danil Gushchin (born 2002), Russian ice hockey player
- Danil Haustov (born 1980), Estonian swimmer
- Danil Ishutin, full name of Dendi (gamer) (born 1989), Ukrainian esports player
- Danyl Johnson, British singer who competed in The X Factor (British TV series) series 6
- Danil Junaidi (born 1986), Indonesian footballer
- Danil Kapustyansky (born 2004), Russian football winger
- Danil Karpov (born 1999), Russian football forward
- Danil Kazantsev (born 2001), Russian football midfielder
- Danil Khalimov (born 1978), Kazakh Greco-Roman wrestler
- Danil Khromov (born 2002), Russian football forward
- Danil Klyonkin (born 1990), Russian football player
- Danil Kopach (born 2000), Belarusian football midfielder
- Danil Krugovoy (born 1998), Russian football left-back
- Danil "Donk" Kryshkovets (born 2007), Russian Counter-Strike player.
- Danil Kuraksin (born 2003), Estonian football winger
- Danil Kutuzov (born 1987), Russian futsal player
- Danil Lavrentev (born 2003), Russian martial artist
- Danil Lipovoy (born 1999), Russian midfielder
- Danil Luppa (born 1998), Russian football defender
- Danil Lysenko (born 1997), Russian track and field athlete
- Danil Mamayev (born 1994), Russian ice hockey player
- Danyl Mashchenko (born 2002), Ukrainian footballer
- Danil Massurenko (born 1999), Russian football forward
- Danil Mussabayev (born 1998), Kazakh gymnast
- Danil Neplyuyev (born 1998), Russian football player
- Danil Pelikh (born 2001), Russian football right-back
- Danil Poluboyarinov (born 1997), Russian football player
- Danil Prutsev (born 2000), Russian football midfielder
- Danil Reshetnikov, full name of Diamondprox (born 1992), Russian esports player
- Danil Romantsev (born 1993), Russian ice hockey player
- Danil Sadreev (born 2003), Russian ski jumper
- Danil Savinykh (born 2001), Russian football defender
- Danil Skorko (born 2002), Ukrainian football defender
- Danil Stepanov (born 2000), Russian footballer
- Danil Tsupryk (born 2002), perpetrator of the Sakhanka and Leninske killings
- Danil Ustimenko (born 2000), Kazakh football goalkeeper
- Danil Yerdakov (born 1989), Russian ice hockey player
- Danil Yurtaikin (born 1997), Russian ice hockey player
- Danil Zhilkin (born 2003), Russian ice hockey player

== See also ==
- Daniel (given name)
- Daniil
- Danila (given name)
- Danylo
- Daniils
