= Daniils =

Latvian masculine given name

Daniils is a Latvian masculine given name. It is derived from the Russian Daniil, which itself is derived from Daniel, meaning "God is my judge". Notable individuals with the name include:

- Daniils Bobrovs (born 1997), Latvian swimmer
- Daniils Čiņajevs (born 2003), Latvian football midfielder
- Daniils Isačenko (born 1999), Lativan football goalkeeper
- Daniils Hvoiņickis (born 1998), Lativan football midfielder
- Daniils Kolodinskis (born 2000), Latvian speedway racer
- Daniils Skopenko (born 2000), Latvian football midfielder
- Daniils Turkovs (born 1988), Latvian football forward
- Daniils Ulimbaševs (born 1992), Latvian football midfielder

== See also ==
- Danil
- Danila (given name)
- Danylo
