= Danila (given name) =

Masculine given name

Danila is a given name that means "God is my judge" in Hebrew. It is a masculine name in Russian and other Slavic languages, as a variation on the name Daniel. Notable individuals with the surname include:

== Association football ==
- Danila Bokov (born 2002), Russian football goalkeeper
- Danila Buch (born 2008), Kazakh football goalkeeper
- Danila Bulgakov (born 2005), Finnish football goalkeeper
- Danila Buranov (born 1996), Russian football midfielder
- Danila Chechyotkin (born 2000), Russian football centerback
- Danila Godyayev (born 2004), Russian football midfielder
- Danila Kalikhanov (born 2001), Russian football defender
- Danila Kalin (born 2002), Russian football centerback
- Danila Khakhalev (born 1997), Russian footballer
- Danila Khotulyov (born 2002), Russian football player
- Danila Knyazev (born 2003), Russian football midfielder
- Danila Kozlov (footballer, born 1997), Russian football defender
- Danila Kozlov (footballer, born 2005), Russian football midfielder
- Danila Molodnyakov (born 2002), Russian football defender
- Danila Nechayev (born 1999), Belarusian football defender
- Danila Polshikov (born 2001), Russian football midfielder
- Danila Polyakov (born 1993), Russian football midfielder
- Danila Prokhin (born 2001), Russian football player
- Danila Proshlyakov (born 2000), Russian football forward
- Danila Savelyev (born 2008), Russian football midfielder
- Danila Smirnov (born 2001), Russian football midfielder
- Danila Sokirchenko (born 1995), Kyrgyz football defender
- Danila Sukhomlinov (born 2002), Russian football midfielder
- Danila Vedernikov (born 2001), Russian football left-back
- Danila Vorobyev (born 2003), Belarusian football forward
- Danila Yanov (born 2000), Russian football midfielder
- Danila Yashchuk (born 1995), Russian football left-wing
- Danila Yemelyanov (born 2000), Russian football midfielder
- Danila Yermakov (born 1998), Russian football goalkeeper
- Danila Yezhkov (born 2001), Russian football forward

== Other sports ==
- Danila Alistratov (born 1990), Russian ice hockey player
- Dănilă Artiomov (born 1994), Moldovan swimmer
- Danila Izotov (born 1991), Russian swimmer
- Danila Karaban (born 1996), Belarusian ice hockey player
- Danila Klimovich (born 2003), Belarusian ice hockey player
- Danila Kuznetsov (born 1976), Russian canoeist
- Danila Leykin (born 2007), American gymnast
- Danila Semerikov (born 1994), Russo-Uzbek speed skater
- Danila So Delgado (born 2001), Portuguese-Spanish handball player
- Danila Sotnikov (born 1993), Russian-Italian wrestler
- Danila Turchin (born 1978), Uzbek sprint canoeist
- Danila Yurov (born 2003), Russian ice hockey player

== Others ==
- Danila Antsiferov (died 1712), Russian explorer
- Danila Botha (born 1982), South African-born Canadian author
- Danila Kozlovsky (born 1985), Russian actor and director
- Danila De Lucia (born 1961), Italian politician
- Danila Matveyev, 17th-century Russian bellmaker
- Danila Comastri Montanari (1948–2023), Italian writer
- Dănilă Papp (1868–1950), Romanian general
- Danila Poperechny (born 1994), Russian comedian and YouTuber
- Danila Tkachenko (born 1989), Russian virtual artist
- Danila Vassilieff (1897–1958), Russian-Australian painter and sculptor

== See also ==
- Daniil
- Danil
- Danylo
