= Mamayev =

Mamayev or Mamaev (Russian: Мамаев) is a Slavic masculine surname originating from the Turkic name Mamai, its feminine counterpart is Mamayeva or Mamaeva. It may refer to

- Danil Mamayev (born 1994), Russian ice hockey player
- Eldar Mamayev (born 1985), Russian football player
- Nursultan Mamayev (born 1993), Kazakhstani taekwondo practitioner
- Oleg Mamayev (1925–1994), Russian oceanographer
- Pavel Mamayev (born 1988), Russian football player
- Yuri Mamaev (born 1984), Russian football midfielder

== See also ==
- Mamayev Kurgan, a hill in Volgograd, Russia, named after Mamai
