= CICAR =

CICAR may refer to:

- Cooperative Institute for Climate Applications and Research
- Cooperative Investigation of the Caribbean and Adjacent Regions
- Centre for Indian Christian Archaeological Research
