= Danilin =

Danilin (masculine), Danilina (feminine) (Russian: Данилин, Данилина) is a Russian surname that is derived from the male given name Danila and literally means Danila's. It may refer to:

- Anna Danilina
- Maksim Danilin (footballer, born 1979), Russian football player
- Maksim Danilin (footballer, born May 2001), Russian football player with FC Dynamo Moscow
- Maksim Danilin (footballer, born September 2001), Russian football player with FC Spartak-2 Moscow
- Nadejda Danilina
- Sergey Danilin (1901–1978), Soviet aviator
- Sergey Danilin (born 1960), Soviet luger
- Vyacheslav Danilin (born 1984), Russian football player
