= Maksim Danilin =

Maksim Danilin may refer to:

- Maksim Danilin (footballer, born 1979), Russian football player
- Maksim Danilin (footballer, born May 2001), Russian football player with FC Dynamo Moscow
- Maksim Danilin (footballer, born September 2001), Russian football player with FC Spartak-2 Moscow
