= Vasili Ilik =

Russian footballer

Personal information
- Full name: Vasili Valentinovich Ilik
- Date of birth: 5 November 2001 (age 25)
- Place of birth: Khor, Russia
- Height: 1.81 m (5 ft 11 1/2 in)
- Position: Right-back

Team information
- Current team: Dynamo Barnaul
- Number: 53

Senior career*
Years	Team	Apps	(Gls)
2020–2023	SKA-Khabarovsk	9	(0)
2021–2024	→ SKA-Khabarovsk-2	55	(4)
2022–2023	→ Novosibirsk (loan)	13	(0)
2024	Astrakhan	26	(0)
2025	Smorgon	1	(0)
2025–	Dynamo Barnaul	55	(0)
- * Club domestic league appearances and goals as of 1 November 2026

Vasili Valentinovich Ilik (Russian: Василий Валентинович Илик; born 5 November 2001) is a Russian football player who plays for Dynamo Barnaul.

== Club career ==
He made his debut in the Russian Football National League for FC SKA-Khabarovsk on 1 August 2020 in a game against Alania Vladikavkaz, he substituted Daniil Ivankov in the 89th minute.
