= Danillo =

Danillo is a given name. People with the name include:

- Danillo Villefort (born 1983), Brazilian professional mixed martial artist
- Danillo Sena, American politician in the Massachusetts House of Representatives
- Danillo Bala (born 1993), Brazilian footballer
- Danillo Ribeiro (born 1993), Brazilian footballer

== See also ==
- Danilo, a given name
- Danylo (disambiguation)
