= Romantsev =

Romantsev (Russian: Романцев) is a Russian masculine surname, its feminine counterpart is Romantseva. It may refer to:

- Danil Romantsev (born 1993), Russian ice hockey player; and
- Oleg Romantsev (born 1954), Russian football coach and former player.
