= Hans Falk =

Hans Falk may refer to:

- Hans Falk (painter), Swiss painter
- Hans Falk (bellmaker), Russian bellmaker
