= Danilov =

Danilov (masculine) or Danilova (feminine) may refer to:

- Danilov (surname) (Danilova), Russian last name
- Danilov (dynasty), see House of Durnovo
- Danilov, Yaroslavl Oblast, a town and the administrative center of Danilovsky District in Yaroslavl Oblast, Russia
- Danilov (inhabited locality) (or Danilova), several inhabited localities in Russia
- Danilov Monastery, a monastery in Moscow, Russia
