= Antipov =

Antipov (Russian: Антипов) is a Russian masculine surname, its feminine counterpart is Antipova. The surname is derived from the male given name Antip and literally means Antip's. It may refer to:

- Aleksandras Antipovas (born 1955), Lithuanian runner
- Anton Antipov (bodybuilder) (born 1983), American bodybuilder and model of Belarusian descent
- Anton Antipov (born 1990), Russian football player
- Artyom Antipov (born 1988), Russian football player
- Dmitry Antipov (born 1984), Russian water polo player
- Evgenia Antipova (1917–2009), Russian painter
- Ivan Antipov (born 1980), Brazilian Operations Manager
- Julia Antipova (born 1997), Russian pair skater
- Marina Antipova (born 1992), Russian ice dancer
- Nikita Antipov (born 1997), Russian football player
- Sergei Antipov (born 1974), Kazakhstani ice hockey player
- Sergey Antipov (1953–2018), Soviet canoer
- Svetlana Antipova (born 1966), Russian basketball player
- Tetyana Tereshchuk-Antipova (born 1969), Ukrainian hurdler
- Vadym Antipov (born 1988), Ukrainian football player
- Vladimir Antipov (born 1978), Russian ice hockey player
- Yuliya Antipova (born 1966), Soviet luger
