= Hans Falk (bellfounder) =

Dutch-Russian bellfounder

Hans Falk, (probably Nuremberg around 1578), also known as Ivan Falk or Johann Falk (Russian: Ганс Фальк), was a Dutch-Russian bellfounder of German origin. In the Netherlands, he was known as Hans Falck van Neurenberg. In the 1610s he lived and worked in Den Bosch and in 1619 he became a citizen of Leeuwarden, where he started a foundry. A lot of churches in Friesland and a few in Groningen bear his name on their bells. Around 1634/1635 he left Friesland for Russia. His foundry in Leeuwarden was taken over by Jacob Noteman.

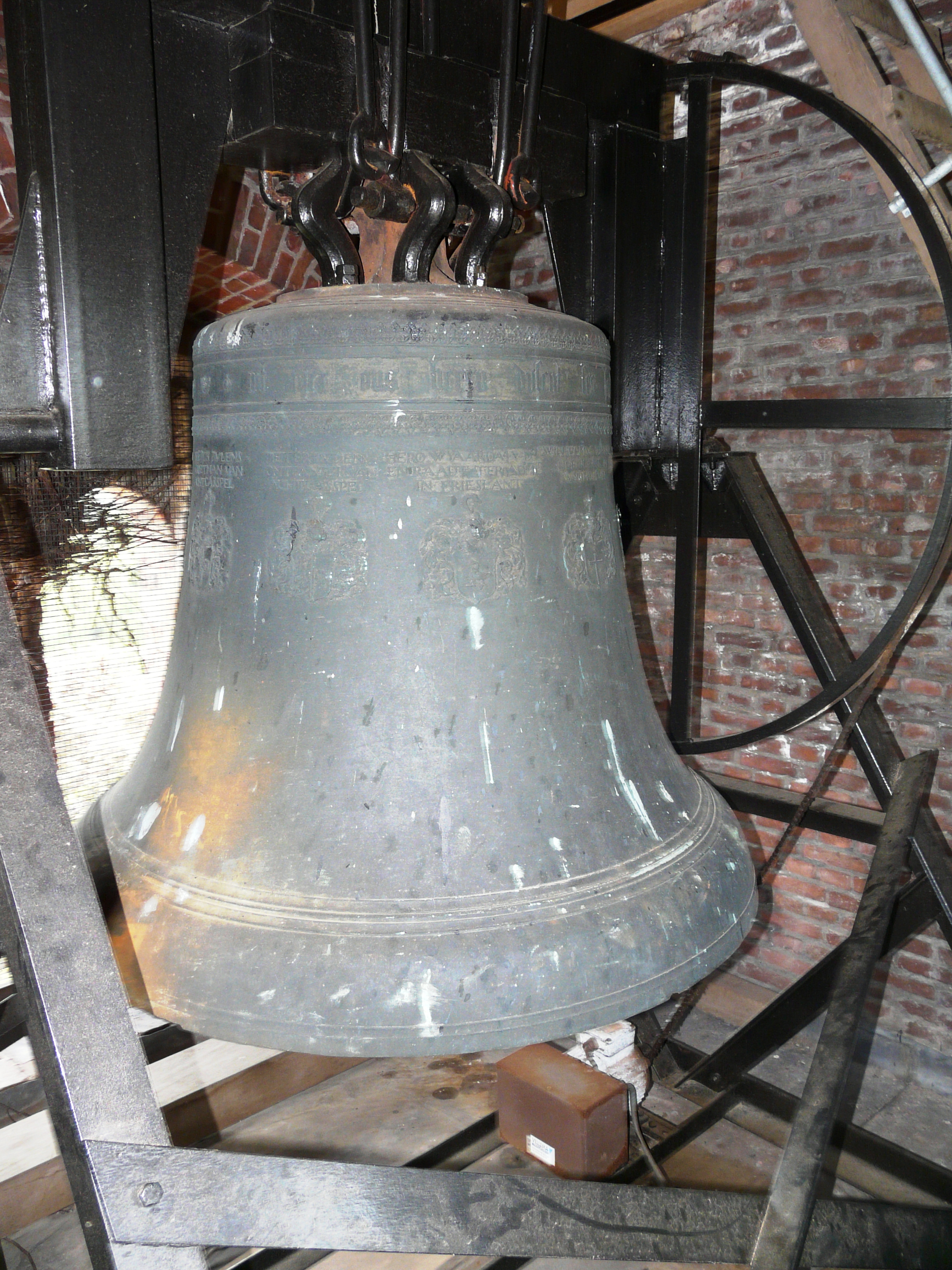
Bell made by Hans Falk yn the tower of the church in Surhuizum

The name of Hans Falk, as a Moscow Cannon Yard craftsman, was first mentioned in historical documents in 1627. From then on and until the late 1650s, he was considered as the main cannon and bellmaker of Moscow. Falk was paid an official salary and given a "gift from the tsar" once a year. He was granted a workshop made of stone at the Moscow Cannon Yard, while other Russian foundrymen had to work in those made of wood. Hans Falk lived at the household of Knyaz Mikhail Kozlovsky on Rozhdestvenskaya Street. In April 1641, he filed a petition in the name of Mikhail Fyodorovich, asking the tsar to provide him with his own household, which would soon happen.

A German scholar Adam Olearius, who travelled through Russia in the 1630s, mentions Hans Falk in his book Beschreibung der muscowitischen und persischen Reise, saying that he was a very experienced craftsman from Nuremberg and taught Russians how to cast cannons. Adam Olearius also says that Falk was able to make cannons that could discharge 26 pounds (11.8 kg) of iron with 25 pounds (11.3 kg) of gunpowder. According to Olearius, this is what made Hans Falk famous in Holland.

In Russia he kept his techniques secret, dismissing his Russian assistants at certain crucial parts of the process.

In 1641, Mikhail Fyodorovich ordered Hans Falk to cast a 700-pood (11,500 kg) bell for the Dormition Cathedral of the Moscow Kremlin, which would shatter 10 years later. In 1652, Falk took issuance with some of the Russian bellmakers (led by Danila Matveyev and Yemelyan Danilov) on recasting of this bell and lost the court battle.

Hans Falk worked in Russia for more than 25 years. He rarely affixed signatures on his works; therefore, only a few bells can be attributed to Falk:

- a bell for the Nativity Monastery in Vladimir (1632)
- a bell for the Annunciation Cathedral in Kazan (1640; signed by Falk)
- a bell for the Trinity Church in Nikitniki (1649; it is now a part of the State Historical Museum collection)
- a bell for the belfry of the Savva Storozhevsky Monastery near Zvenigorod (1652)
- a bell for the Transfiguration Cathedral in Yaroslavl (signed by Falk)
- possibly, the 35-pood (570 kg) Rodionovsky bell on the Ivan the Great Bell Tower of the Moscow Kremlin, cast in 1647

It is also known that Hans Falk recast one of the bells for the Ivan the Great Bell Tower and cast the Yunak harquebus.

It is not clear how Hans Falk's service at the Moscow Cannon Yard came to an end. He could have returned to his motherland, when his services were no longer needed, or he could have died of plague in the 1650s like many other Russian craftsmen. Nevertheless, his work had significant impact on the Russian founding art of the second half of the 17th century. Historical documents mention four of Falk's apprentices: Stepan Orefyev, Timofei Timofeyev Utinkov, Ivan Timofeyev Reztsov, and Ivan Ivanov. A certain succession of Falk's casting traditions can be traced in the works of Yemelyan Danilov, Alexander Grigoryev, and the Motorins.
