= Danilo (disambiguation) =

Danilo is a masculine given name.

Danilo may also refer to:

== People with the surname ==
- Jules Danilo (born 1995), Italian-born French motorcycle racer
- Paul Danilo (1919–2013), American soccer player, coach and administrator

== Other uses ==
- Danilo, Croatia, a village
- Danilo culture, a Neolithic culture located on the Dalmatian coast of Croatia and in parts of Bosnia
