= Kirill Kapustin =

Russian ice hockey player

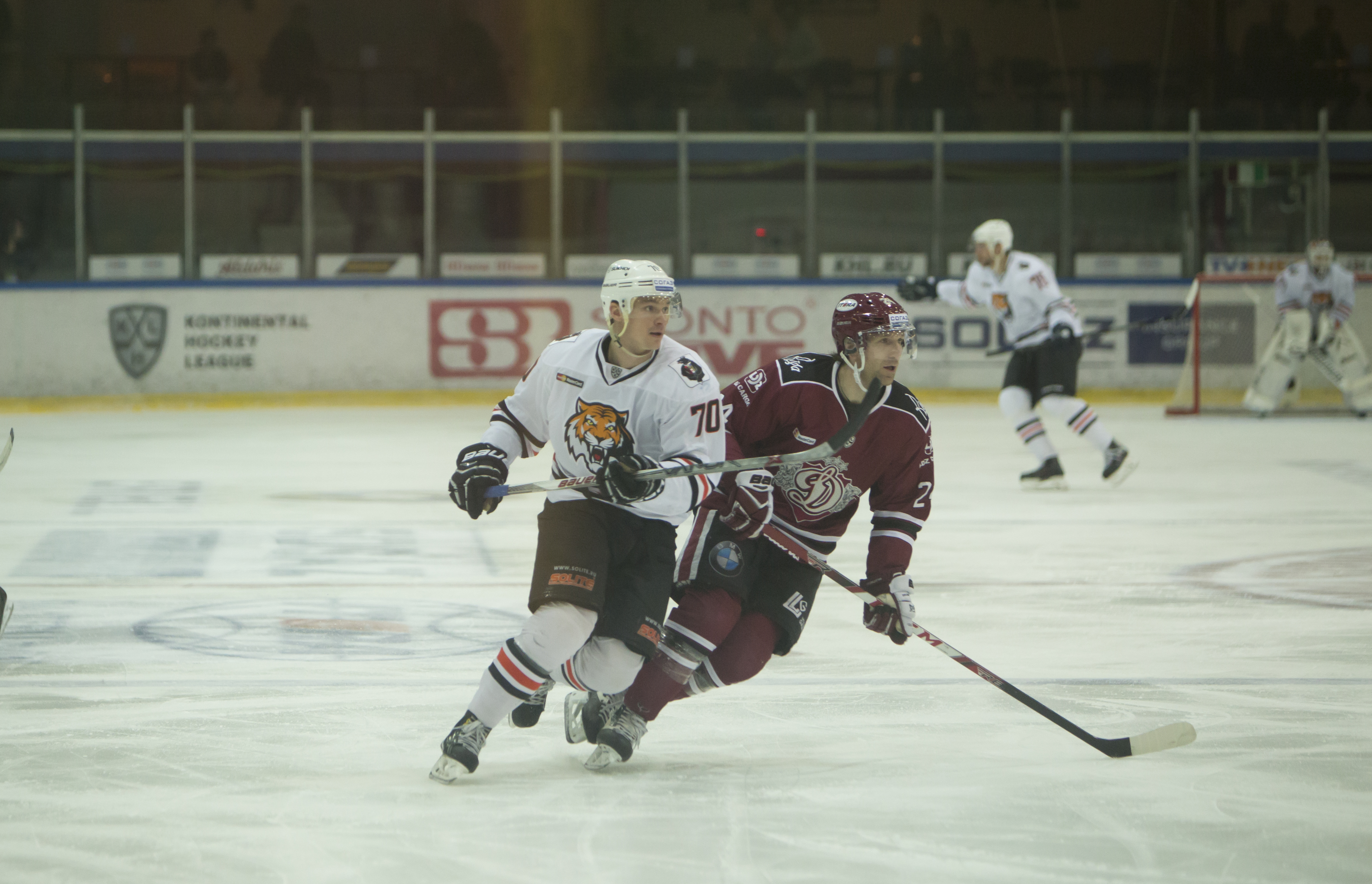
- Born: February 8, 1993 (age 33) Yaroslavl, Russia
- Height: 6 ft 1 in (185 cm)
- Weight: 192 lb (87 kg; 13 st 10 lb)
- Position: Forward
- Shoots: Left
- Slovak.1 team Former teams: HK Levice; Lokomotiv Yaroslavl; Amur Khabarovsk; Lada Togliatti; HC Sochi; Severstal Cherepovets; Traktor Chelyabinsk; Neftekhimik Nizhnekamsk
- Playing career: 2013–present

Kirill Kapustin (Кирилл Капустин; born February 8, 1993) is a Russian professional ice hockey player. He is currently playing under contract with HK Levice of the Slovak 1. Liga (Slovak.1).

== Playing career ==
Kapustin made his Kontinental Hockey League (KHL) debut playing with Lokomotiv Yaroslavl during the 2013–14 KHL season. On August 15, 2016, Kapustin ended his tenure with Lokomotiv as he was traded for compensation to fellow KHL team, Amur Khabarovsk.

On May 16, 2017, Kapustin was returned to Lokomotiv by Amur in a trade alongside Alexander Yelesin in exchange for Danil Romantsev.

After two seasons with Severstal Cherepovets, Kapustin left as a free agent and was signed to a two-year contract with his sixth KHL club, Traktor Chelyabinsk, on 6 May 2021.

At the conclusion of his contract with Traktor Chelyabinsk, Kapustin was signed to an initial tryout contract in a return to Amur Khabarovsk on 21 August 2023.
