= FC Dynamo Barnaul =

Russian football club

Dynamo Barnaul
- Full name: Football Club; Dynamo Barnaul
- Nicknames: Dynamite, Dynamiki (Loudspeakers)
- Founded: 1957; 69 years ago
- Ground: Dynamo, Barnaul
- Capacity: 16,000
- Chairman: Alexey Minin
- Manager: Aleksandr Dantsev
- League: Russian Second League, Division B, Group 4
- 2026: 5th
- Website: fcdb.ru
Home colours	Away colours

FC Dynamo Barnaul (Russian: ФК «Динамо-Барнаул») is a Russian professional club from Barnaul, founded in 1957. It plays in the fourth-tier Russian Second League Division B. It played amateur level football for the 2013–14 season, after failing its licence due to debts owed to players.

== Current squad ==
As of 13 September 2026, according to the official Second League website.

Note: Flags indicate national team as defined under FIFA eligibility rules; some limited exceptions apply. Players may hold more than one non-FIFA nationality.

No.	Pos.	Nation	Player
7	DF	RUS	Ivan Zhitnikov
8	MF	RUS	Nikita Antipov
10	MF	RUS	Mikhail Osipov
11	MF	RUS	Roman Kolmakov
13	MF	RUS	Anton Petukhov
14	FW	RUS	Stepan Mikhaylin
16	GK	RUS	Ilya Bychkov
17	DF	RUS	Savely Ulyanov
18	MF	RUS	Anton Shadura
20	MF	RUS	Savva Korshunov
21	MF	RUS	Andrey Zhigalov
23	MF	RUS	Nikita Vorona
24	DF	RUS	Ilya Khatuntsev
25	FW	RUS	Kirill Mogel
27	MF	RUS	Artyom Sablin

No.	Pos.	Nation	Player
28	DF	RUS	Aleksandr Reyz
32	MF	RUS	Daniil Chernobay
35	GK	RUS	Mikhail Kulish
38	MF	RUS	Yegor Perevoznikov
39	GK	RUS	Danil Barybin
49	MF	RUS	Dmitry Bakay
53	DF	RUS	Vasili Ilik
73	MF	RUS	Danil Reshetnikov
77	MF	RUS	Aleksandr Yegorov
81	MF	RUS	Timur Belousov
85	DF	RUS	Artyom Malfanov
90	DF	RUS	Ivan Gordeychik
95	GK	RUS	Maksim Yedapin
96	FW	RUS	Artyom Yarkin
