= Dmytro Dedko =

Lord of Ruthenia in 14th century

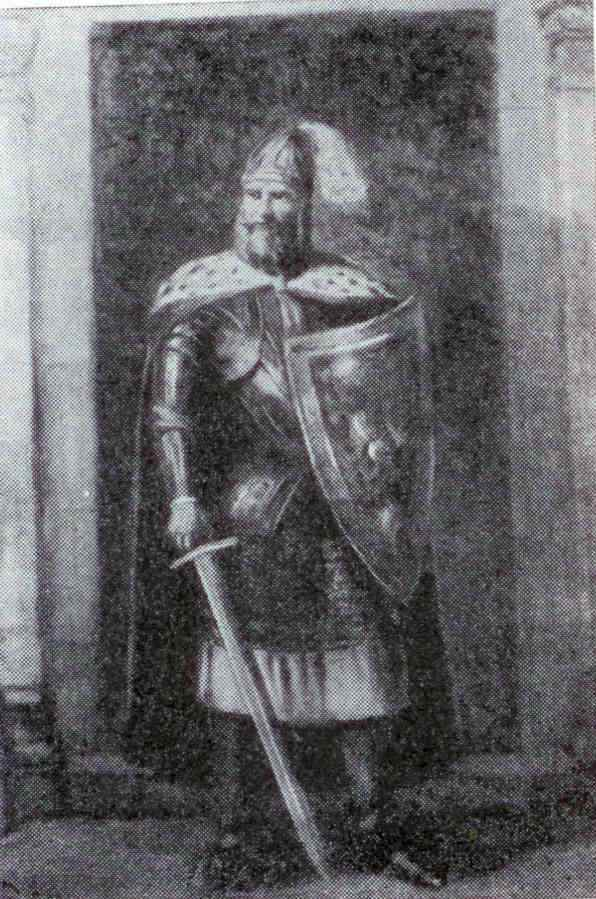
Illustration ("History of cities and villages of Soviet Ukraine". Ukrainian Soviet Encyclopedia, 1978)

Dmytro Dedko (Ukrainian: Дмитро Дедько; Latin: Demetrius Dedko) was a Lord of Ruthenia in 1340 (1323) – 1349. Commonly thought to be a Galician boyar, he could be one of sons of Yuriy I and Varvara (Barbara). Dmytro is possibly the progenitor of the Ostrozky family.

== Life ==
Dmytro is mentioned in a number of scientific works on history of that period such as "History of Ukraine-Ruthenia" by Mykhailo Hrushevsky, "Die polnische Geschichtschreibung des Mittelalters" by Heinrich Ritter von Zeissberg and others. The Russian historian Alexander Presnyakov argues Hrushevsky's claims that Dmytro was representative of Liubart in Galicia, rather in his declarations Dmytro states that Galician princes are his ancestors.

Among the most solid historical benchmarks signed by Dmytro in 1341 is a document "Letter to residents of Torun" that survived to our days where he calls to revive economical and social relationships between the city of Toruń and Halychyna.

During the Polish-Hungarian aggression against the Kingdom of Ruthenia, Dmytro successfully defended his territory, serving simultaneously as a vassal of three rulers: Lithuanian Liubartas, Casimir the Great and Louis I of Hungary. Nevertheless, in 1344-1345 Casimir succeeded in annexing Sanok.

With the death of Dmytro and agreement with the Khan of Golden Horde Janibeg, Casimir occupied Halychyna in 1349. In return for the Halychyna occupation, Poland promised a tribute to Golden Horde.

== Dmytro, son of Yuriy ==
Ukrainian writer Volodymyr Bilinsky argues that Dmytro Dedko is not a "Galician boyar", but rather a true Lord of Ruthenia and a son of Yuriy I of Galicia. Bilinsky also claims that Dmytro is a father of Danylo Ostrozky.

The writer also says that in the Kingdom of Ruthenia there was a diarchy where one ruler governed in Volhynia, while another governed in Halychyna. Bilinsky states that Dmytro governed Halychyna not since 1340, but rather 1323 after the death of both Andriy and Yuriy II and along with Yuriy-Boleslav Troidenovych (Bolesław Jerzy II of Mazovia).

== See also ==
- Ostrozky family

Dmytro Dedko Romanovichi Born: c. ???? Died: c. 1349
Regnal titles
Preceded by Yuriy II	Lord of Ruthenia; 1340–1349	Succeeded by adopted by Piast dynasty
