= King of Ruthenia =

Title of Princes of Galicia and Volhynia

- Rex Rutheniae
- Coat of arms of the Galicia–Volhynia

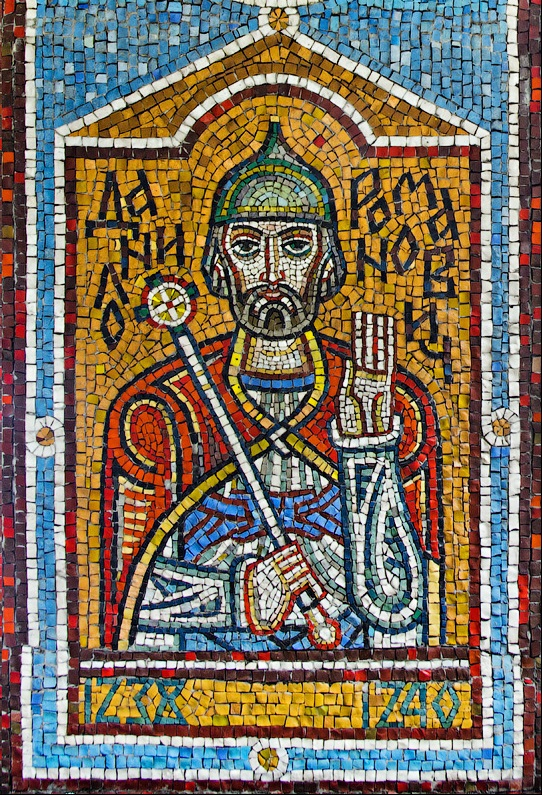
- Daniel of Galicia

Details
- First monarch: Daniel of Galicia
- Last monarch: Casimir III the Great
- Formed: 1253
- Abolished: 1370
- Residence: Kholm (1253-1271) Lviv (1271-1349)
- Appointer: Hereditary

The King of Ruthenia (Latin: Rex Rutheniae) or King of the Ruthenians (Latin: Rex Ruthenorum), also known as the King of Rus' or King of Russia (Latin: Rex Rusiae, Rex Russiae; Rex Rusciae; Ukrainian: Король Русі), were royal titles held or claimed by various medieval and later monarchs and dynasts, mainly among various East Slavic, but also Polish, Lithuanian and Hungarian rulers and princes. During the 13th and 14th centuries, principal claimants on those titles were rulers of Galicia–Volhynia.

== Title ==
In the 13th–14th centuries, many of the principalities of southwestern Rus' were united under the power of the Kingdom of Ruthenia (Latin: Regnum Russiae), known in historiography as the Kingdom of Galicia–Volhynia. Its ruler, Roman the Great, was variously named dux Rutenorum, princeps Ruthenorum or rex Ruthenorum by Polish chroniclers. Daniel of Galicia was crowned Rex Ruthenorum in 1253. Alternatively, Daniel and his brother Vasylko Romanovich were styled princeps Galiciae, rex Russiae, and rex Lodomeriae in Papal documents, while the population of Galicia and Volhynia was called Rusciae christiani and populus Russiae, amongst other names. The Gesta Hungarorum (c. 1280) stated that the Carpathian Mountains between Hungary and Galicia were situated in finibus Ruthenie ("on the borders of Ruthenia").

Galicia–Volhynia declined by mid-14th century due to the Galicia–Volhynia Wars that began after the poisoning of king Yuri II Boleslav by local Ruthenian nobles in 1340. Iohannes Victiensis Liber (page 218) records the death of Boleslav as Hoc anno rex Ruthenorum moritur (...) ("In that year the king of the Ruthenians died (...)").

== List of kings ==
=== Kingdom of Ruthenia ===
- Danylo I of Halych, king of Rus' (1253–1264).
- Lev I of Halych, king of Rus' (1293–1301), moved the capital from Kholm to Lviv in 1272.
- Yuri I of Halych, prince of Halych-Volhynia (1301–1308)
- Andrew I of Halych (Volhynia) and Lev II of Halych (Galicia), the last Romanovichi kings
- Yuri II Boleslav, married Maria co-ruler of Galicia (1325–1340) Maria was Andrew's and Leo's sister
- Dmytro Dedko, Lord of Rus', Prince of Galicia (1340-1349)
- Liubartas, married Euphemia (Hanna-Buch), co-ruler of Volhynia (1323–1366), prince of eastern Volhynia (1366–1384) Euphemia was Andrew's and Leo's sister
- Casimir III the Great, King of Poland (1333–1370), Lord of Rus' (1349-1370)

After the death of Boleslav-Yuri II of Halych, Galicia–Volhynia Wars ensued which resulted in Galicia gradually being annexed by the Kingdom of Poland, between 1349 and 1366, during the reign of Casimir III of Poland.

At the death of Casimir III the Great all of titulage was passed over to Louis I of Hungary

=== Kingdom of Hungary ===
- Andrew II of Hungary, the son of Béla III of Hungary, the first nominal king of Galicia who, as a Hungarian prince, reigned from 1188 to 1190.
- Coloman of Galicia-Lodomeria (Kálmán), the first king of Galicia and Lodomeria, lat. Rex Galiciae et Lodomeriae (1215–1219) and his wife Salomea of Poland, Reges Galiciae et Lodomeriae
- Andrew (András), the younger brother of Coloman, Hungarian prince, king of Galicia and Lodomeria (1219–1221)
- Louis I of Hungary, King of Hungary (1342–1382), King of Poland (1370–1382), incorporated Halych–Volhynia to Hungary
  - Władysław II Opolczyk, Silesian prince, Hungarian count palatine, Lord of Rus’/Ruthenia (1372–1378)

=== After 1378 ===
Grand Duke of Lithuania Gediminas called himself King of the Lithuanians and [many] Ruthenians in the 1320s. In the subsequent years, all Kings of Poland-Lithuania styled themselves Lord of Rus’ (or Ruthenia). Simultaneously, the tsars of Russia adopted from 1547 onwards the title Tsar of All-Rus’ . The Hungarian kings continued to claim the title of King in Halych and Volhynia, later taken over together with the Hungarian Crown by the Holy Roman emperors.

=== After the Partitions of Poland ===
After the Partitions of Poland, the tsars of Russia styled themselves Emperor of all the Russias, while the Holy Roman Emperors (later emperors of Austria and of Austria-Hungary) used the title of King of Galicia and Lodomeria drawn from the historical claims of Hungarian Kings to Halych–Volhynia to justify the annexations of territories belonging to Polish-Lithuanian Commonwealth, in spite of the fact that the newly established rump puppet Kingdom of Galicia and Lodomeria was included in the Austrian instead of Hungarian part of the empire, the true historical claimant of the region. Part of Galicia was included in the puppet Kingdom of Poland (1916-1918) re-established by the Central Powers and ruled by the Regency Council. All these monarchies were abolished upon the end of World War I. However, the Kingdom of Hungary was formally re-established in 1920 along with its royal titles and styles, and its territory even included at a time the Carpathian Ruthenia, following the breakup of the Second Czechoslovak Republic. Nevertheless, its throne remained vacant until the ultimate abolition of Hungarian monarchy in 1946.

== Sources ==
- Isaievych, Iaroslav (2004). "On the Titulature of Rulers in Eastern Europe" (PDF). Journal of Ukrainian Studies. 29 (1–2): 67–87. Archived from the original on 2025-12-22.
- Voloshchuk, Myroslav (2021). Ruthenians (the Rus') in the Kingdom of Hungary (11th to mid-14th Century): Settlement, Property, and Socio-Political Role. Leiden: Brill. p. 360. ISBN 9789004469709. Archived from the original on 14 April 2023.
