= Danila =

Danila, Dănilă or Dănila may refer to:

== People ==
- Danila (given name), a given name

== Places ==
- Dănila, a village in Dărmănești, Suceava, Romania
