= Vasily Danilov =

Vasily Danilov may refer to:

- Vasiliy Danilov (born 1941), Soviet/Russian footballer (soccer player)
- Vasilii Danilov (born 1988), 2004 and 2008 Olympic swimmer from Kyrgyzstan

== See also ==
- Danilov (disambiguation)
