= Oleg Mamayev =

Soviet oceanographer

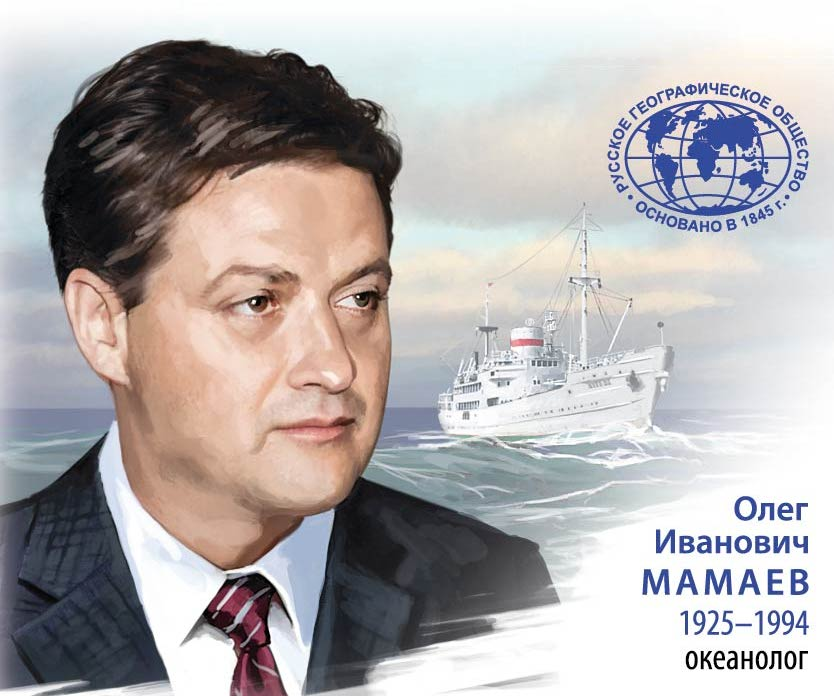
- Born: 7 November 1925; Moscow, Russia
- Died: 28 August 1994 (aged 68); Kaliningrad, Russia
- Education: Moscow State University (1953)
- Scientific career
- Fields: Oceanography

Oleg Ivanovich Mamayev (Russian: Олег Иванович Мамаев, 7 November 1925 – 28 August 1994) was a Soviet oceanographer, professor, and head of the Oceanology Department at the Moscow State University.

== Personal life ==
He was born to Ivan Kirillovich Mamayev (1895–1938) and Raisa Moiseyevna Mamayeva (1900–1982) and was married to Rimma Borisovna Mamayeva (1926–2011).

== Education ==
- 1941 – Graduated from the 8th grade of secondary school, Moscow.
- 1941–1942 – Worked and studied at the Navigation Department of River Technical School, did practical work along the Moscow River, was an external student and studied at courses for military translators, Moscow.
- 1948 – Graduated from a Secondary School for Working Young People, with a silver medal.
- 1948–1950 – Studied at the Faculty of Geography, Moscow State University (MSU).
- 1950 – Worked as an assistant for two expeditions of the Institute of Fisheries and Oceanography of the Sea of Azov and the Black Sea (AZCHERNIRO) – oceanographic survey of the Black Sea.
- 1950–1953 – Student, Department of Oceanology, Faculty of Geography, MSU
- 1951 – Participated in two cruises of the Institute of Fisheries and Oceanography of the Baltic Sea (BALTNIRO) on R/V "Alazan" in the North Sea.
- 1953 – Graduated cum laude from Moscow State University.

== Military service ==
He served in the Soviet Army from 1942 to 1946, serving in the 304th independent line signal battalion, 423rd independent cable-telegraph company, participated in the war against Japan (in the Far East).

== Professional career ==
- 1953 – Worked as a hydrographer during the winter cruise of the R/V "Vityaz" of the Institute of Oceanology of the USSR Academy of Sciences in the northern part of the Pacific Ocean and in the Bering Sea.
- 1953–1962 – Assistant at the Department of Oceanology, Faculty of Geography, MSU.
- 1955 – Worked as a hydrographer aboard the trawler "Lomonosov" during a research reconnaissance expedition of the BALTNIRO in the North Sea.
- 1957–1963 – Participated in the expeditions aboard the R/V "Mikhail Lomonosov" as a researcher, science secretary, the head of the hydrographical team.

== Academic career ==
- 1958 – Defended his Candidate of Science thesis: "Dynamical Surface of No Motion of the World Ocean."
- 1962–1969 – Assistant Professor of the Department of Oceanology, Faculty of Geography, MSU.
- 1965–1969 – Science Secretary of the hydrometeorological section of the Academic Council of the Faculty of Geography, MSU.
- 1966 – Defended his thesis "Basis of the T-S Analysis of the World Ocean Waters" for a degree of Doctor of Geographical Sciences.
- 1966–1969 – Principal Investigator of scientific work under contract with the Acoustics Institute.
- 1968 – Participated in an expedition of the Institute of Fisheries and Oceanography of the Pacific Ocean (TINRO) on the R/V "Professor Diryugin."
- 1969–1977 – Assistant Intergovernmental Oceanographic Commission, Secretary for Regional Programmes at the UNESCO Secretariat, Paris, France.
- 1969–1977 – Participated in developing, organizing and holding joint international research: CICAR, CIK, CINECA, CIESM, SOK, etc.
- 1970–1994 – Member of the working group of experts of UNESCO/ICES/SCOR/IAPSO on Oceanographic Tables and Standards (JPOTS).
- 1978 – Professor of the Department of Oceanology, MSU.
- 1978–1994 -Member of the Commission on the Problems of the World Ocean under the USSR Academy of Sciences.
- 1979–1989 – Deputy Chairman of the section Physics and Chemistry of the Ocean of the Commission on the Problems of the World Ocean under the USSR Academy of Sciences.
- 1979–1990 – Chairman of the Working Group of the USSR Academy of Sciences on Oceanographic Tables and Standards under the Commission on the Problems of the World Ocean.
- 1979–1985 – Member of the Council of Experts of the All-Union Attestation Committee on Earth Sciences.
- 1980–1992 – The Soviet National Co-ordinator on issues of training of experts, education in the field of marine sciences (TEMA), IOC, UNESCO.
- 1980–1991 – Member of the Academic Council of the State Committee for Science and Technology on The World Ocean Programme.
- 1981–1986 – Chairman of the Specialised Hydrometeorological Council at Moscow State University.
- 1986 – Chairman and organiser of the First meeting of the UNESCO/SCOR/ICES/IAPSO Joint Editorial Board on the new international manual "Processing of Oceanographic Station Data," Moscow,
- 1987–1994 – Head of the Department of Oceanology, MSU, member of the Academic Council of the Faculty of Geography, MSU.
- 1991–1994 – Member of the editorial board of Oceanology magazine.
- 1992 – Member of the international organising committee of a session on "Meso- and Microstructure of the Ocean – Records and Process Models", St. Petersburg, Russia.
- 1992 – Worked at the Science Applications International Corporation (SAIC) in Seattle, USA, and lectured at the University of Washington, Scripps Institution of Oceanography, La Jolla, and the University of British Columbia, Vancouver, Canada.
- 1992–1994 – Member of the National Oceanographic Committee of the Russian Federation.
- 1993 – Nominated the National Co-ordinator for the Training and Education in Marine Sciences (TREDMAR) program, the UNESCO Division of Marine Sciences

== Main publications ==
- Mamayev, O.I. (1962). Нулевая динамическая поверхность мирового океана: Под ред. А.Д. Добровольского. Изд-во Московского университета.
- Mamayev, O.I. (1970). Т, С-анализ вод Мирового океана. Gidrometeoizdat.
- Mamayev, O.I. (1975). Temperature-salinity Analysis of World Ocean Waters. Elsevier Scientific Publishing. ISBN 978-0-444-41251-5.
- Joint Panel on Oceanographic Tables and Standards (1991). Mamayev, O.I. (ed.). Processing of Oceanographic Station Data. Unesco Press. ISBN 978-92-3-102756-7.
- Mamayev, O.I. (1992). Abyssal Ocean Waters. Moscow State University.
