= Danilov (surname) =

Danilov (Russian: Дани́лов, masculine) or Danilova (Russian: Дани́лова, feminine) is a common Russian last name. Notable people with the surname include:

- Alexandra Danilova (1903–1997), Russian-born prima ballerina, who became an American citizen
- Angelina Danilova (born 1996), Russian singer, model and actress
- Elena Danilova (born 1987), Russian international association football player
- Galina Danilova (born 1968), Russian actress
- Irina Danilova (born 1993), Kazakhstani handball player
- Kirsha Danilov, probable compiler of first collection of Russian bylinas
- Maria Danilova (1793–1810), Russian ballet dancer
- Nichita Danilov (born 1952), Romanian writer
- Oleksiy Danilov (born 1962), Ukrainian politician
- Olga Danilova (born 1970), Russian Olympic cross country skier
- Olga Danilov (born 1973), Ukrainian-Israeli short track speed skater
- Pelageya Danilova (1918–2001), Russian artistic gymnast
- Sergei Danilov (born 1989), Russian association football player
- Tamara Danilova (born 1939), Russian Olympic discus thrower
- Valentin Danilov (born 1951), Russian physicist
- Vasily Danilov (disambiguation), list of people
- Viktor Danilov (1927–2016), Russian-born Belarusian Greek Catholic priest and Soviet dissident
- Viktor Danilov (historian) (1925–2004), Russian agricultural historian
- Vitaliy Danilov (born 1967), president of Ukrainian Premier League and Honorary President of FC Kharkiv
- Yuri Danilov (1866–1937), Russian military figure and historian

== Fictional characters ==
- Vladimir Danilov, half-demon from Danilov the Violinist
