= Profitis Daniil, Athens =

Profitis Daniil Προφήτης Δανιήλ
- Neighborhood
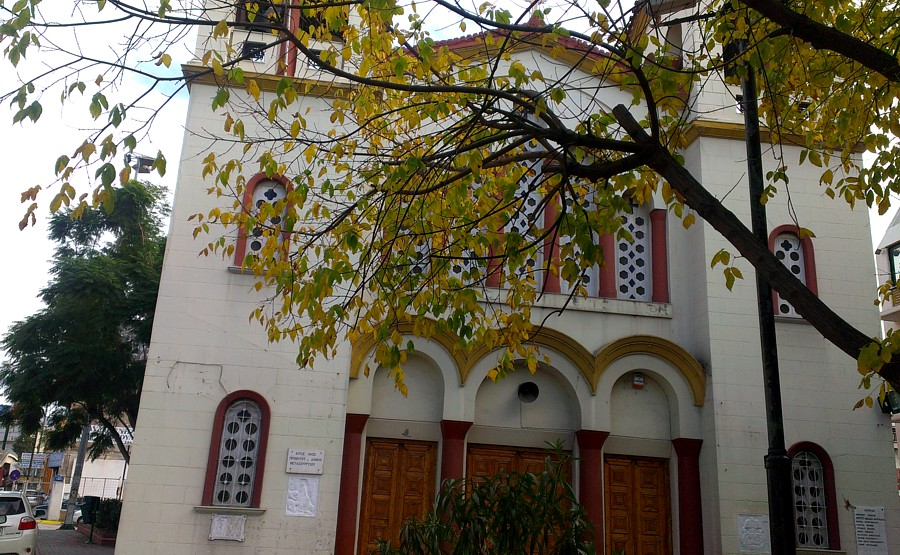
- Profitis Daniil church

- Location within Athens municipality
- Country: Greece
- Region: Attica
- City: Athens
- Postal code: 104 47
- Area code: 210
- Website: www.cityofathens.gr

Profitis Daniil (Greek: Προφήτης Δανιήλ pronounced [pɾoˈfi.tis ðaniˈil]) meaning 'Prophet Daniel' is a neighborhood of Athens, Greece. It takes its name from the main church on Athinon Avenue.
