= Viktor Danilov =

Viktor Danilov (20 July 1927 – 7 December 2016) was a parish priest of the Greek Catholic parish in Grodno, dean of the Belarusian Greek Catholic Church, chaplain, writer in Soviet times and religious dissident.

== Biography ==
Born in Yaroslavl in 1927 in a family of medical doctors. In 1947 he entered the Yaroslavl Pedagogical Institute. In 1948 he was arrested for his criticism of Stalin, accused of anti-Soviet propaganda. Danilov was convicted under Articles 58-10 and 58-11 of the Criminal Code of the Russian Federation to 10 years in labor camp. For preparation of the escape was second conviction for a period of 10 years. During the captivity of prisoners met the priests, to rethink their positions, abandoned Marxism and atheism and accepted Catholicism. In 1955, released under the amnesty.

Some time later, he was completely exonerated. Since December 1955 he continued his studies in the History Department of the Yaroslavl Pedagogical Institute. However, after his first diploma was not issued on the grounds that he was an active Catholic, as the administration of the Institute became aware of denunciation. Only persistence Daniel, his official request to government agencies, statements of religious discrimination allowed, under the "thaw", to defend their rights and receive a diploma. In 1960, he moved to Vilnius in 1963. In 1967 he moved to Grodno, where he engaged in underground missionary activity. Searched twice, he was summoned for questioning.

In the early 1970s, he received an offer to study for the priesthood of the Byzantine rite. In 1976, he was secretly ordained a priest in Lviv by Metropolitan Volodymyr Sterniuk. He returned to Grodno, becoming the first Greek Catholic priest in modern Belarus, and began a priestly ministry underground. Later legalised, in 1992 he began teaching religious education and theology. In 1999, he was named archpriest and dean of the Greek Catholic Church in Belarus. He died in Yaroslavl on 7 December 2016, aged 89.

== Reading ==
- Leanid Marakou, Represavanyya litaratary, navukoўtsy, rabotnіkі asveta, gramadskiya i kulturnyya dzeyachy of Belarus, 1794-1991 (2003); ISBN 985-6374-04-9.
- Vladimir Kolupaev, Proceedings of the International Scientific Conference (19 November 2010), dedicated to the 1000th anniversary of the city of Yaroslavl. Yaroslavl: Remder (2011), pp. 221–26; ISBN 978-5-94755-276-8
- Viktor Danilov, My way to God and to the Catholic Church. Grodno, (1997, 2003)
