= Danila Vorobyev =

Belarusian footballer

Personal information
- Date of birth: 16 December 2003 (age 22)
- Place of birth: Belarus
- Position: Forward

Team information
- Current team: Orsha
- Number: 99

Youth career
- 2019–2020: DSK Gomel
- 2020–2021: Sputnik Rechitsa

Senior career*
Years	Team	Apps	(Gls)
2021	Sputnik Rechitsa	2	(1)
2022–2024	Bumprom Gomel	54	(20)
2024–	Orsha	10	(1)
- * Club domestic league appearances and goals as of 10 December 2024

Danila Vorobyev (Belarusian: Даніла Вараб’ёў; Russian: Данила Воробьёв; born 16 December 2003) is a Belarusian professional footballer who plays for Orsha.
