= Danilo Pennone =

Italian writer

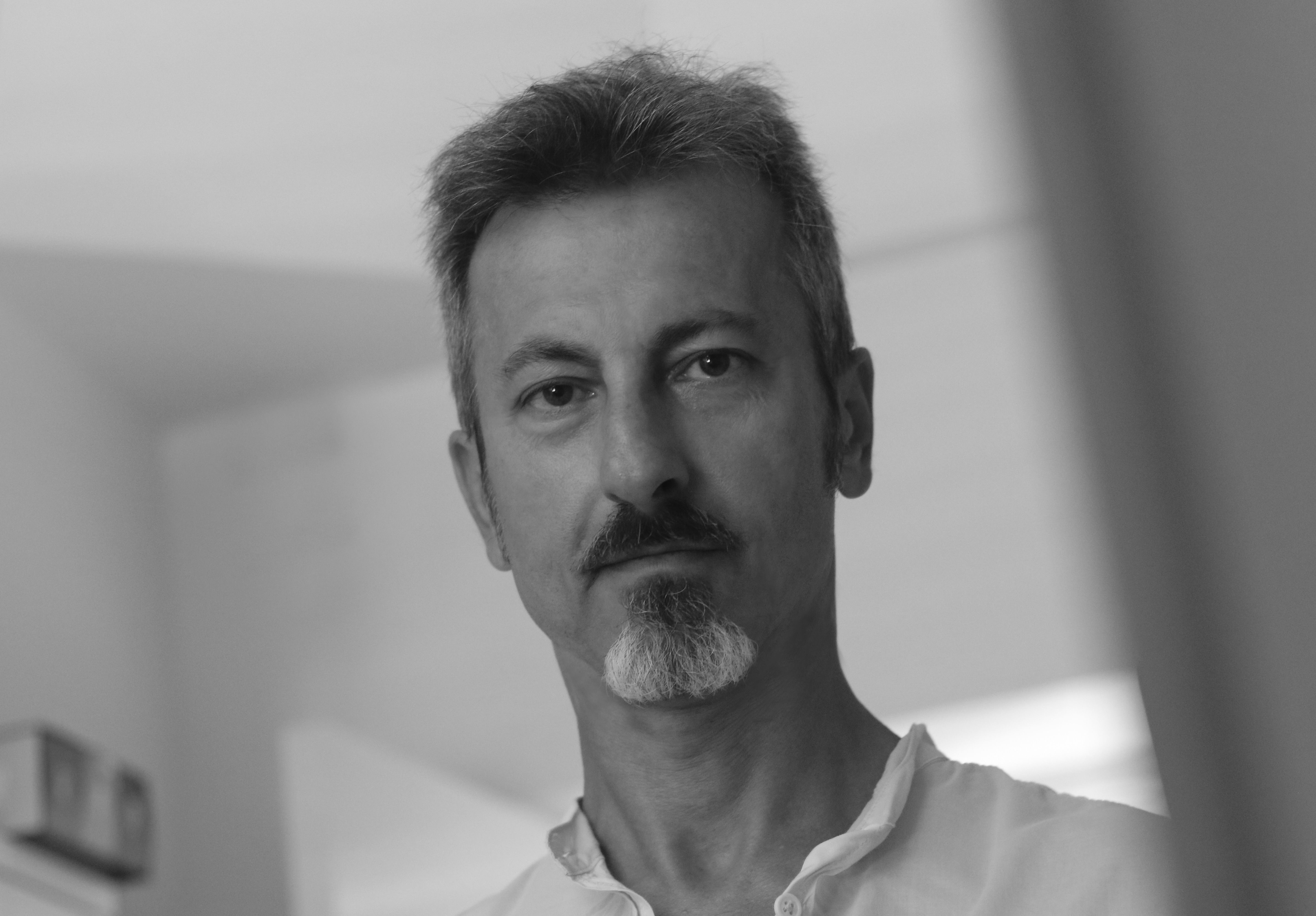
Pennone in 2018

Danilo Pennone (born July 14, 1963, in Rome) is an Italian writer.

== Biography ==
An Arts graduate, Pennone teaches in Rome. His first published works, essays on Celtic mythology, date back to the eighties. In 2008, his first novel, Confessioni di una mente criminale (Confessions of a Criminal Mind), was published from which has been adapted the theatrical production of the same name, staged at the Todi Art Festival 2009, under the artistic direction of Maurizio Costanzo, and in the Roman prisons Regina Coeli and Rebibbia.

He has recorded three CDs, sharing lyrics and musical credits as a co-author. Some of his compositions have been included in the main digital music platforms, on music blogs and international advanced music streaming services. In 2007, a production of his musical comedy Era l'estate dell'amore (That was the Summer of Love) was performed in Rome, directed by Greg, with Pennone as writer of both the script and music.

The story Grand Hotel due omicidi is shortlisted at the 2019 Giallo Ceresio Award. The novel Delitto di Ferragosto is shortlisted at the 2023 NebbiaGialla Award.

Since 2006, he has taught History of Cinema at the University of Rome 'La Sapienza'.

== Bibliography ==
=== Stories ===
- Diversivo coniugale, Storie, No 27/28, 1997
- Grand Hotel due omicidi, Delitti di lago 4, No 4, Morellini Editore, 2020 – ISBN 978-88-629-8744-8

=== Novels ===
- Confessioni di una mente criminale, Newton Compton Editori, 2008 – ISBN 88-541-1021-3

=== Inspector Mario Ventura ===
- Il cadavere del lago (Le indagini del commissario Ventura Vol. 1), Newton Compton Editori, 2019 – ISBN 978-88-227-2551-6
- Delitto alle saline (Le indagini del commissario Ventura Vol. 2), Newton Compton Editori, 2020 – ISBN 978-88-227-4293-3
- Delitto di Ferragosto (Le indagini del commissario Ventura Vol. 3), Newton Compton Editori, 2022 – ISBN 978-88-227-5976-4

=== Essays ===
- Il ritorno di Finn Mac Cool, Abstracta, No 41, 1989
- I druidi d'Irlanda, Abstracta, No 51, 1990
- Le fate irlandesi, Conservazione, No 13, 1990
- I Celti, miti e leggende, Stile Regina Editore, 1990
- La semiosi dello specchio e il suo uso simbolico nel cinema americano, Cimena, No 3, 2006– ISBN 88-89604-14-X
- Brian O'Nolan: uno scrittore tra eccentricità e sperimentazione, Avanguardia, No 34, 2007
- Il cibo e la fame nel cinema picaresco di Sergio Citti, Cimena, No 4, 2008– ISBN 978-88-89604-37-3
- Cinema spagnolo, Cineuropa. Storia del cinema europeo, 2009– ISBN 978-88-89604-59-5
- Cinema portoghese, Cineuropa. Storia del cinema europeo, 2009– ISBN 978-88-89604-59-5

== Plays ==
- 2007, Era l'estate dell'amore
- 2009, Confessioni di una mente criminale
- 2012, Un, deux, trois… Pam, Ham!

== Discography ==
- 2004, Benedetto amore (Interbeat INTS 20-04)
- 2006, Bastava che ci capissimo io e i miei (Interbeat INT 01-06), Storie di Note
- 2009, Il paese che non-c'è (Interbeat INTS 09)
- 2012, Straniero (Interbeat – Musica&Teste M&T 03-12), Egea

== See also ==
- Crime novel
- Music
- Theater
