= Danila Savelyev =

Russian footballer (born 2008)

Personal information
- Full name: Danila Romanovich Savelyev
- Date of birth: 28 January 2008 (age 18)
- Height: 1.73 m (5 ft 8 in)
- Position: Central midfielder

Team information
- Current team: Krylia Sovetov Samara; Krylia Sovetov-2 Samara
- Number: 59

Youth career
- Krylia Sovetov Samara

Senior career*
Years	Team	Apps	(Gls)
2025–	Krylia Sovetov-2 Samara	35	(1)
2025–	Krylia Sovetov Samara	1	(0)

International career^{‡}
2023–2024	Russia U16	8	(0)
2025	Russia U17	4	(0)
- * Club domestic league appearances and goals as of 1 November 2026 ‡ National team caps and goals as of 21 February 2025

Danila Romanovich Savelyev (Russian: Данила Романович Савельев; born 28 January 2008) is a Russian football player who plays as a central midfielder for Krylia Sovetov Samara and Krylia Sovetov-2 Samara.

== Career ==
Savelyev made his debut in the Russian Premier League for Krylia Sovetov Samara on 30 November 2025 in a game against Krasnodar.

== Career statistics ==
As of 1 November 2026

Club	Season	League			Cup		Total	
Club	Season	Division	Apps	Goals	Apps	Goals	Apps	Goals
Krylia Sovetov-2 Samara	2025	Russian Second League B	14	1	–		14	1
Krylia Sovetov-2 Samara	2026	Russian Second League B	21	0	–		21	0
Krylia Sovetov-2 Samara	Total		35	1	0	0	35	1
Krylia Sovetov Samara	2025–26	Russian Premier League	1	0	0	0	1	0
Career total			36	1	0	0	36	1
