= Daniil Karpyuk =

Russian ice hockey player

- Born: January 1, 1988 (age 38) Novosibirsk, Russian SFSR, Soviet Union
- Height: 5 ft 10 in (178 cm)
- Weight: 174 lb (79 kg; 12 st 6 lb)
- Position: Forward
- Shot: Right
- Played for: HC Sibir Novosibirsk
- Playing career: 2004–2012

Daniil Vladimirovich Karpyuk (Russian: Даниил Владимировчи Карпюк; born January 1, 1988) is a Russian former professional ice hockey forward.

Karpyuk played for HC Sibir Novosibirsk in the Russian Superleague and the Kontinental Hockey League. He also played two seasons in the Kazakhstan Hockey Championship for Arlan Kokshetau.
