= Danilović =

Danilović/Даниловић
- Pronunciation: [danǐːloʋitɕ]

Origin
- Language: Serbian
- Meaning: the son of Danilo
- Region of origin: Serbia

Danilović (Serbian Cyrillic: Даниловић) is a Serbian surname, meaning "the son of Danilo".

== People with this name ==
- Branislav Danilović (born 1988), football goalkeeper
- Goran Danilović, Serbian politician in Montenegro
- Olga Danilović (born 2001), Serbian tennis player
- Predrag Danilović (born 1970), Serbian basketball player
