= Centre for Indian Christian Archaeological Research =

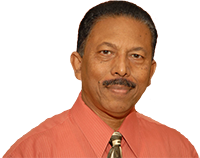
First Director of Centre for Indian Christian Archaeological Research

The Centre for Indian Christian Archaeological Research (CICAR) is an Indian organisation intended to draw research of the link between Indian and Christian cultures.

The organisation was founded in 1996. The enthusiasm and spirit of initiative of f. J. Vazhuthanapally and the support of the dioceses of Changanacheri led to the creation of the CICAR, which has already started to move in the planned direction in agreement with IsIAO.

This institution has Office in Firenze, Italy: Site at Lower Kodungallur, Thumbur, Kochi, Kerala
