= Salomea of Poland =

Queen of Halych (Galicia) and Poor Clare nun, beatified by the Catholic Church

Salome of Poland
- Queen of Halych (Galicia)
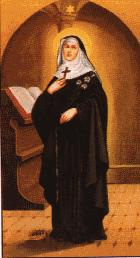
- Reign: 1215–1219
- Born: 1211/1212; Kraków, Kingdom of Poland
- Died: 1268; Skała, Lesser Poland Province, Crown of the Kingdom of Poland
- Burial: Basilica of St. Francis of Assisi, Kraków, Poland
- Spouses: Coloman of Galicia
- House: Piast
- Father: Leszek the White
- Mother: Grzymisława of Łuck
- Religion: Roman Catholic

Blessed Salome, O.S.C.

Virgin
- Venerated in: Catholic Church (Order of St. Clare)
- Beatified: 1672, Rome, Papal States, by Pope Clement X
- Major shrine: Basilica of St. Francis of Assisi, Kraków, Poland
- Feast: November 18

Salome of Poland (1211/2 – 1268), also known as Salome of Cracow or Blessed Salome (Polish: Błogosławiona Salomea), was a Polish princess and from 1215 to 1219 the Queen of Galicia by virtue of being the wife of King Coloman of Galicia.

== Life ==
Salomea was the daughter of Leszek I the White, who was the Duke of Kraków and thus the High Duke in Poland, and his wife Grzymisława of Łuck (or Lutsk). She was the older sister of Bolesław V the Chaste. Her marriage to Kálmán, who was the son of King András or Andrew II of Hungary, was negotiated when she was about three. Since her mother had ancestral connections to the lands of Galicia, and both her father and King Andrew wanted to dominate that area, this plan seemed to meet the needs of both parties. The marriage of Salomea and Kálmán, who was seven at the time, occurred in 1215. In 1219 their control in Galicia was ended and for a time they were taken as prisoners. After their release they returned to Hungary and lived in Szepes, now Spiš in the nation of Slovakia.

In 1226 Kálmán was named Duke of Slavonia by his father, and he took responsibility for the rule of Slavonia, Croatia, and Dalmatia. He died in 1241 from wounds suffered at the Battle of Mohi during the Mongol invasion of Europe.

Salomea supported the Franciscans in Poland. In 1245 she joined the Order of Poor Ladies and founded a monastery in Zawichost in which to live as nuns according to the Rule of Saint Clare. Because of the danger of a Mongol invasion into Poland, Salomea and the other Poor Ladies moved westward from Zawichost in March 1257, and relocated to Skała, north of Kraków. Salomea was considered saintly and it was said that a star flew out of her mouth when she died.

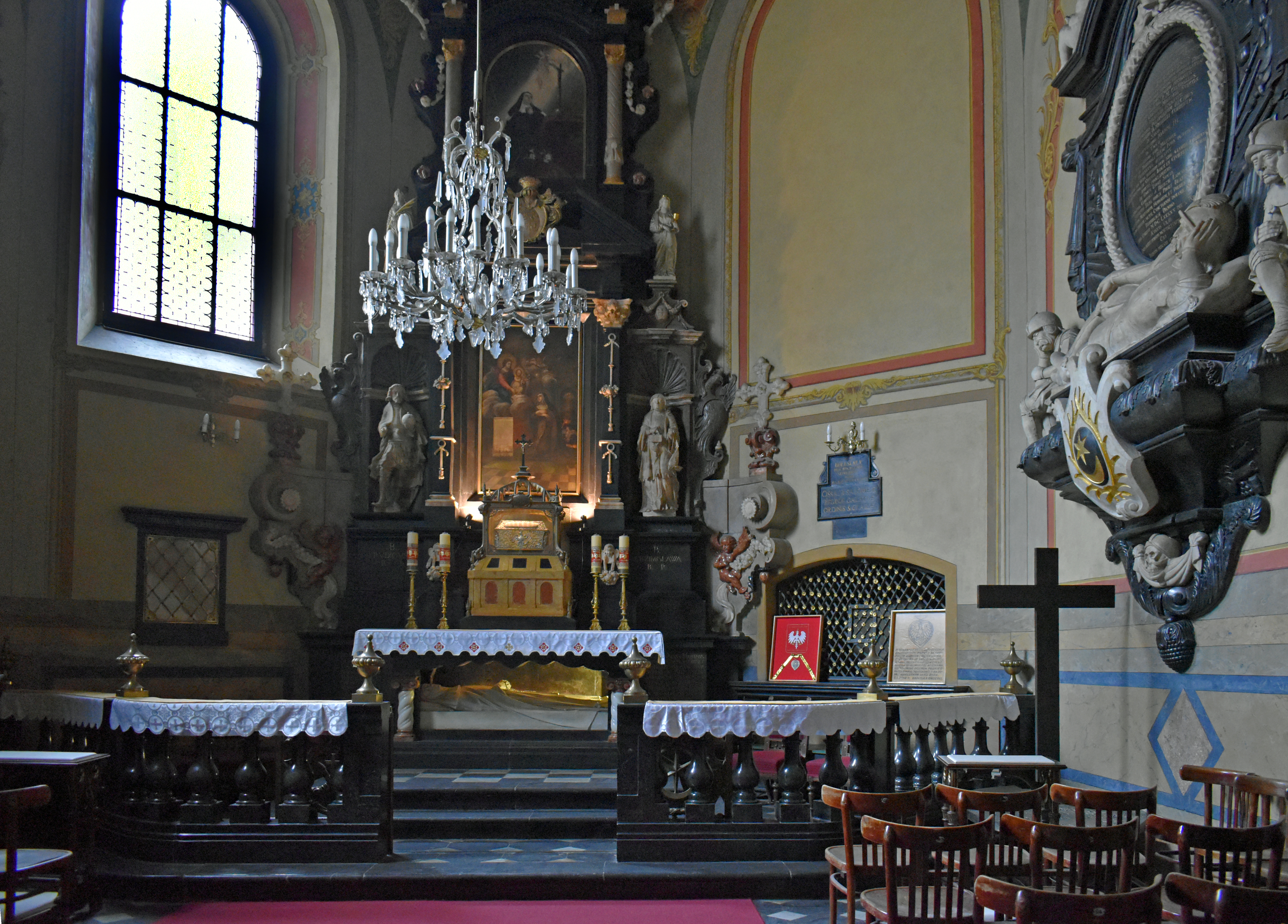
Chapel of Blessed Salomea, St. Francis of Assisi Church, Kraków, Poland

She was beatified in 1672 by Pope Clement X. Her tomb is in Kraków in a chapel within the Church of St. Francis of Assisi. She is also depicted in a stained glass window to the left of the main altar.

== Sources ==
- Gábor Klaniczay (14 March 2002). Holy Rulers and Blessed Princesses: Dynastic Cults in Medieval Central Europe. Cambridge University Press. ISBN 978-0-521-42018-1.
- Holly, Karol (2007). "Princess Salomea and Hungarian – Polish Relations in the Period 1214 – 1241". Historický časopis. 55 (Supplement): 5–32. ISSN 0018-2575.
