= Danilo (footballer, born 1981) =

Brazilian footballer

Personal information
- Full name: Danilo Aguiar Rocha
- Date of birth: 13 February 1981 (age 45)
- Place of birth: Alegre, Brazil
- Height: 1.88 m (6 ft 2 in)
- Position: Centre-back

Senior career*
Years	Team	Apps	(Gls)
2001–2002	Vitória		
2002–2003	Bellinzona		
2004	Estrela do Norte		
- Atlético Sorocaba
2005	São Bento		
2005–2006	Santa Clara		
2006–2009	Vitória de Guimarães		
2009–2010	Santa Clara		
2010–2011	Leixões		
- * Club domestic league appearances and goals

Danilo Aguiar Rocha (born 13 February 1981) is a Brazilian former professional footballer who played as a centre-back.
