= Danilov (inhabited locality) =

Danilov (Russian: Данилов; masculine) or Danilova (Данилова; feminine, or masculine genitive) is the name of several inhabited localities in Russia.

== Modern localities ==
Urban localities

- Danilov, Yaroslavl Oblast, a town in Danilovsky District of Yaroslavl Oblast

Rural localities

- Danilov, Rostov Oblast, a khutor in Grutsinovskoye Rural Settlement of Kamensky District in Rostov Oblast

== Abolished localities ==
- Danilov, Kostroma Oblast, a pochinok in Petretsovsky Selsoviet of Vokhomsky District of Kostroma Oblast; abolished on October 6, 2004

== Alternative names ==
- Danilova, alternative name of Danilovo, a village under the administrative jurisdiction of Domodedovo Town Under Oblast Jurisdiction in Moscow Oblast; 55°18′N 37°52′E
- Danilova, alternative name of Danilovo, a village in Averkiyevskoye Rural Settlement of Pavlovo-Posadsky District in Moscow Oblast; 55°40′N 38°46′E
- Danilova, alternative name of Danilovo, a village under the administrative jurisdiction of the Town of Yegoryevsk in Yegoryevsky District of Moscow Oblast; 55°25′N 39°4′E
