= Danil Kopach =

Belarusian footballer

Personal information
- Date of birth: 17 February 2000 (age 26)
- Place of birth: Grodno, Belarus
- Height: 1.80 m (5 ft 11 in)
- Position: Midfielder

Youth career
- 2016–2019: Neman Grodno

Senior career*
Years	Team	Apps	(Gls)
2019–2022	Neman Grodno	1	(0)
2020–2021	→ Smorgon (loan)	38	(1)
2021	→ Slonim-2017 (loan)	15	(2)
2022	→ Lida (loan)	14	(3)
- * Club domestic league appearances and goals as of 31 December 2022

Danil Kopach (Belarusian: Даніл Копач; Russian: Данил Копач; born 14 July 2000) is a Belarusian former professional footballer.
