= Danylo Dutkevych =

Ukrainian cyclist

Personal information
- Born: 27 June 1990 (age 36)

Cycling career
- Sport: Cycling
- Discipline: Track cycling
- Role: Rider
- Rider type: sprinter

Danylo Dutkevych (Ukrainian: Данило Дуткевич; born 27 June 1990) is a Ukrainian male track cyclist, riding for the national team. He competed in the team sprint event at the 2010 UCI Track Cycling World Championships. He placed top ten 3 times in his career.
