= Daniil Varfolomeevič Avdeev =

Soviet partisan killed in WWII (1917–1944)

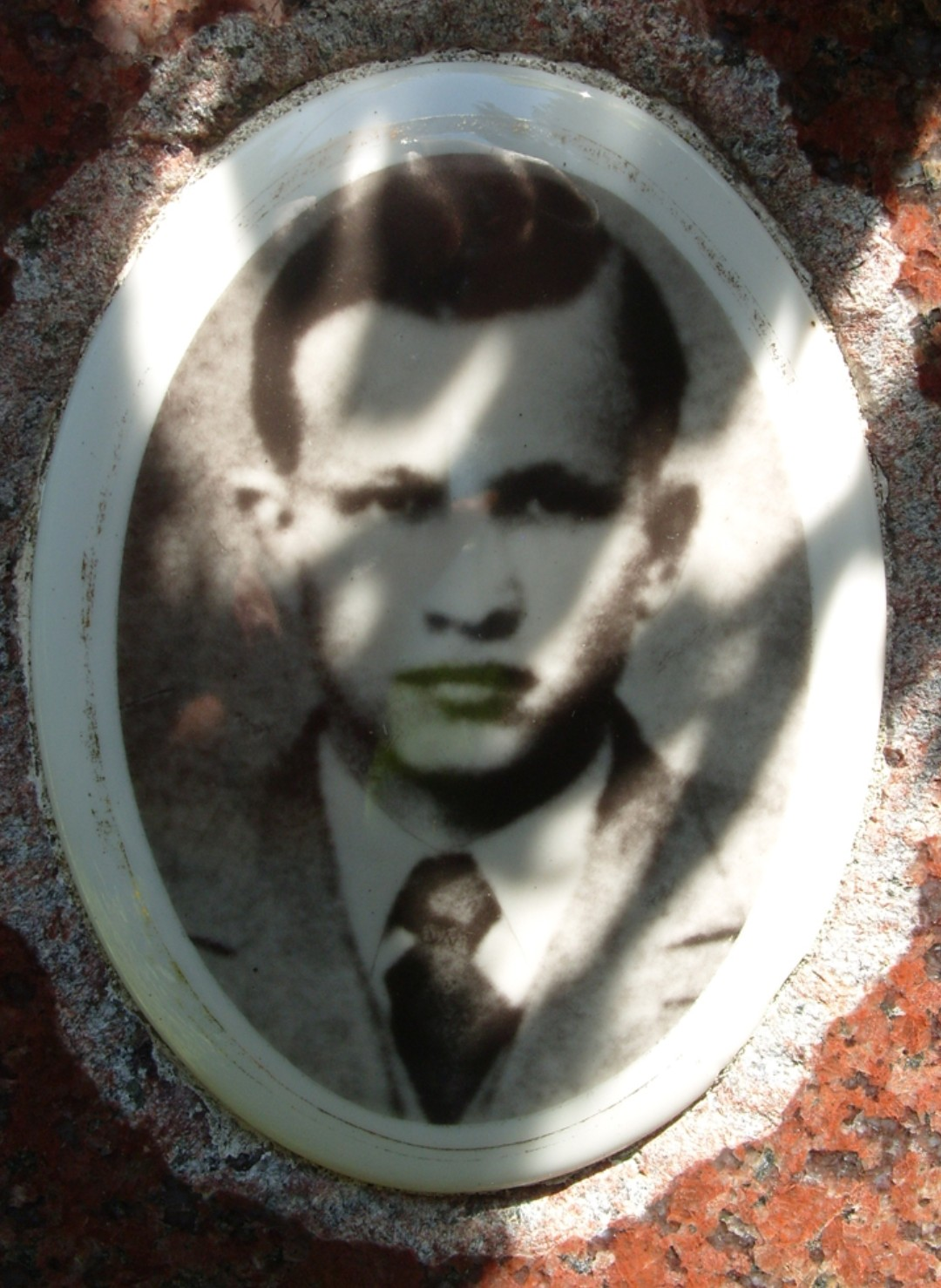
- Burial place picture of Daniil
- Born: 21 December 1917
- Died: 11 November 1944 (aged 26); San Francesco (Vito d'Asio)
- Burial place: Italy, Clauzetto
- Military career
- Allegiance: USSR; Italian Partisan Movement
- Nickname: Daniel
- Known for: His effort as a partisan, especially against Kosakenland
- Awards: Gold Medal of Military Valor

Daniil Varfolomeevič Avdeev (21 December 1917 – San Francesco, 11 November 1944), known by the battle nickname Commander Daniel, worked as a soldier in the Red Army and a Soviet partisan, before being killed in a battle in Italy against Kosakenland.

== Biography ==
Daniil was born into a poor family that was adept at farming, and he graduated from high school. Daniil was assigned as a commander of a cavalry division in the Red Army. However, in the same year, according to Soviet sources, he was reported missing in action. This was because he was taken prisoner by the Germans and in 1942 interned in a concentration camp, first in Muhlberg on the Elbe River, and then in northern France, where he met two other Soviet prisoners of war, Alexander Kopylkov and Anton Melnichuk. At different times, the three friends escaped from the camp and met in neutral Swiss territory. A few weeks later, Daniel and his companions decided to join the Italian partisans to fight against the Kosakenland in Carnia. To do this, they had to walk a long way, and after a hard and daring march lasting more than a month, they arrived in Friuli on May 24, 1944. They initially joined the Matteotti battalion. Daniel then gathered the Soviet citizens who had escaped Nazi captivity into a single unit and placed himself under the command of the Stalin Battalion (composed of Friulians, Russians, Slavs, and Poles) of the Garibaldi “Carnia” Brigade, participating in several battles in defense of the Free Republic of Carnia. On 11 November 1944, during the Nazi offensive along the Upper Tagliamento and Arzino valleys, Danijl Varfolomeevič Avdeev, along with some partisans, in an attempt to blow up the road from which the enemy was approaching, was overwhelmed by large forces and, after a strenuous defense, allowed the Italian partisans to disengage.

Thus, he died in combat attempting to obstacle the Nazi and Cossack reprisals in Val D'Arzino, located in San Francesco di Vito d’Asio (PN). His body would only be discovered days later; He was then buried on 11 November 1944 the outside the Clauzetto cemetery.

Oscar Luigi Scalfaro, awarded a Gold Medal of Military Valor to the memory of the Soviet officer, which was presented in 1987 by the Italian ambassador in Moscow to a great-granddaughter of Commander Daniel.

== Awards ==
Gold Medal of Military Valor - ribbon for ordinary uniform

Gold Medal of Military Valor
"An officer in the Soviet cavalry, he escaped Nazi deportation and, leading a group of compatriots through Switzerland, arrived in the Carnic Prealps in Friuli after a grueling and daring march. Here, he gathered all the Soviet citizens who had escaped Nazi captivity into a single unit and placed himself under the command of Garibaldi in Friuli, operating with courage and sagacity against the common enemy. In November 1944, during the violent Nazi offensive along the upper Tagliamento and Arzino valleys, Daniil Varfolomeevich Avdeev, along with some partisans, in an attempt to blow up the road from which the enemy was advancing, was overwhelmed by large Nazi forces. After a strenuous and heroic defense that allowed the Italian partisans to disengage, he fell in a sublime act of heroism, giving his young life to the cause of Italy's liberation."
— Pielungo di Vito d’Asio in Friuli, 15 November 1944

== Sources ==
- Alberto Buvoli (2005). Comandante Daniel. Un ufficiale russo nella Resistenza friulana. Comune di Pordenone.
- Mario Candotti (1975). "Il battaglione "Stalin" (6).
- Leonardo Picco (2002). Partigiani sovietici nella Valle d'Arzino. Sezione A.N.P.I. di Spilimbergo.
- Pieri Stefanutti (29 July 1996). "Quel russo che combatté assieme ai partigiani".
- Pieri Stefanutti (20 October 1982). "Partigiani sovietici nella Resistenza friulana".
- Pieri Stefanutti, Daniel e i suoi compagni. Partigiani sovietici nella Resistenza friulana tra la Valle del Lago, la Val d'Arzino e la Carnia, Kappa Vu Storia, 2023
