= Nadezhda Danilina =

Soviet luger (born 1967)

Nadezhda Danilina (sometimes spelled Nadejda Danilina; born 17 February 1967 in Novouralsk) is a Soviet luger. Competing in two Winter Olympics, she earned her best finish of eighth in the women's singles event at Calgary in 1988. Danilina was married to Sergey Danilin, who won the silver medal in the men's singles luge event at the 1984 Winter Olympics in Sarajevo and competed in four Winter Olympics overall.
