= Danilo Alves =

Danilo Alves may refer to:

- Danilo Alves (footballer, born 1991) (Danilo Almeida Alves), Brazilian football forward
- Danilo Alves (footballer, born 1996) (Danilo Alves Rodrigues), Brazilian football winger
