= Daniil Barchenkov =

Russian aviator

Daniil Gavrilovich Barchenkov
- Даниил Гаврилович Барченков
- Born: 17 December [O.S. 4 December] 1917; Goloshevka, Mogilev Governorate
- Died: 30 May 1950 (aged 32)
- Military career
- Allegiance: Soviet Union
- Branch: Soviet Air Force
- Service years: 1938–1950
- Rank: Lieutenant colonel
- Unit: 897th Fighter Aviation Regiment
- Conflicts: World War II
- Awards: Hero of the Soviet Union

Daniil Gavrilovich Barchenkov (Russian: Даниил Гаврилович Барченков; 17 December 1917 – 30 May 1953) was a Soviet fighter pilot during World War II who was awarded the title of Hero of the Soviet Union. A flying ace, his final tally at the end of the war stood at an estimated 19 shootdowns.
