= Danil Luppa =

Russian footballer

Personal information
- Full name: Danil Aleksandrovich Luppa
- Date of birth: 24 May 1998 (age 28)
- Place of birth: Bryansk, Russia
- Height: 1.80 m (5 ft 11 in)
- Position: Defender

Youth career
- 2015–2016: FC Dynamo Bryansk

Senior career*
Years	Team	Apps	(Gls)
2015	FC ArsenaL Bryansk		
2016–2024	FC Dynamo Bryansk	164	(5)
2024	FC Murom	5	(0)
- * Club domestic league appearances and goals as of 16 November 2024

Danil Aleksandrovich Luppa (Russian: Данил Александрович Луппа; born 24 May 1998) is a Russian football player.

== Club career ==
He made his debut in the Russian Football National League for FC Dynamo Bryansk on 8 August 2020 in a game against FC Yenisey Krasnoyarsk, he substituted Igor Khaymanov at half-time.
