= Nikita Antipov =

Russian footballer

Personal information
- Full name: Nikita Olegovich Antipov
- Date of birth: 5 August 1997 (age 29)
- Place of birth: Omsk, Russia
- Height: 1.81 m (5 ft 11 in)
- Position: Defender

Team information
- Current team: Dynamo Barnaul
- Number: 8

Senior career*
Years	Team	Apps	(Gls)
2016–2020	Irtysh Omsk	69	(1)
2020–2022	Kaluga	48	(0)
2022–2024	Irtysh Omsk	38	(2)
2024	Lada-Tolyatti	12	(0)
2025	Uralets-TS Nizhny Tagil	18	(0)
2026–	Dynamo Barnaul	7	(0)
- * Club domestic league appearances and goals as of 1 November 2026

Nikita Olegovich Antipov (Russian: Никита Олегович Антипов; born 5 August 1997) is a Russian football player who plays for Dynamo Barnaul.

== Club career ==
He made his debut in the Russian Football National League for Irtysh Omsk on 1 August 2020 in a game against Yenisey Krasnoyarsk, he substituted Stanislav Mareyev in the 90th minute.
