= Daniil Kamlashev =

Russian footballer (born 2002)

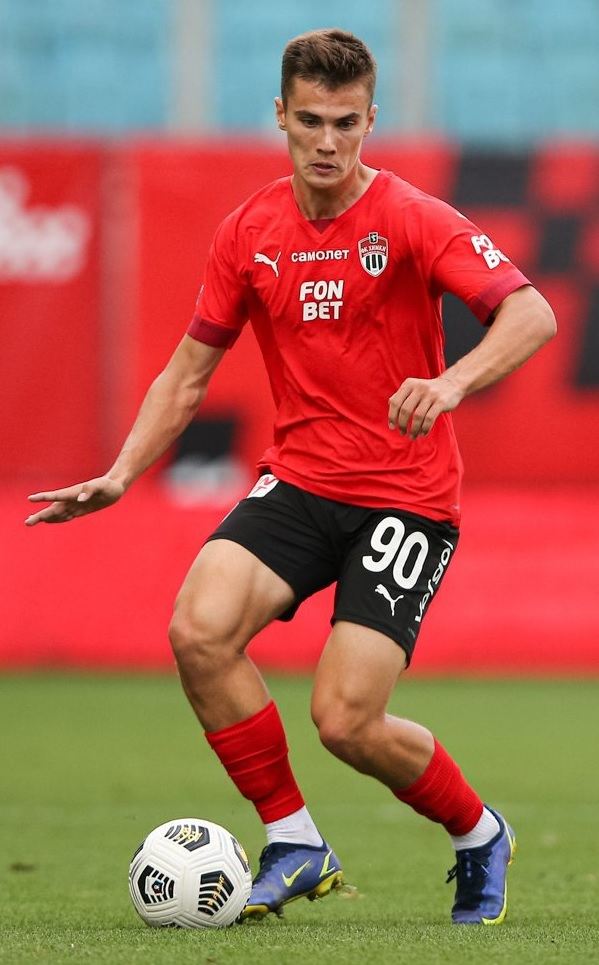
- Kamlashev with Khimki in 2022

Personal information
- Full name: Daniil Vyacheslavovich Kamlashev
- Date of birth: 11 September 2002 (age 24)
- Place of birth: Moscow, Russia
- Height: 1.80 m (5 ft 11 in)
- Position: Midfielder

Youth career
- Strogino Moscow

Senior career*
Years	Team	Apps	(Gls)
2021–2023	Strogino Moscow	31	(10)
2022–2023	→ Khimki-M (loan)	14	(4)
2022–2023	→ Khimki (loan)	0	(0)
2023	→ Volga Ulyanovsk (loan)	6	(0)
2023–2024	Rotor Volgograd	24	(1)
2025	Saturn Ramenskoye	14	(6)
2025–2026	Tyumen	25	(5)
- * Club domestic league appearances and goals as of 14 June 2026

Daniil Vyacheslavovich Kamlashev (Russian: Даниил Вячеславович Камлашев; born 11 September 2002) is a Russian footballer who plays as a midfielder.

== Career ==
Kamlashev made his debut for FC Khimki on 31 August 2022 in a Russian Cup game against FC Krasnodar.

== Career statistics ==
As of 27 November 2022

Club	Season	League			Cup		Continental		Total	
Club	Season	Division	Apps	Goals	Apps	Goals	Apps	Goals	Apps	Goals
Strogino Moscow	2020–21	Second League	9	0	0	0	–		9	0
Strogino Moscow	2021–22	Second League	22	10	1	0	–		23	10
Strogino Moscow	Total		31	10	1	0	0	0	32	10
Khimki	2022–23	RPL	0	0	3	0	–		3	0
Khimki-M	2022–23	Second League	14	4	–		–		14	4
Career total			45	14	4	0	0	0	49	14
