= Maksim Danilin (footballer, born 1979) =

Russian footballer

Personal information
- Full name: Maksim Vasilyevich Danilin
- Date of birth: 1 September 1979 (age 47)
- Height: 1.87 m (6 ft 2 in)
- Positions: Defender; midfielder

Senior career*
Years	Team	Apps	(Gls)
1999–2004	FC Amur Blagoveshchensk	125	(10)
2005–2006	FC Sibir Novosibirsk	35	(2)
2006	FC Metallurg-Kuzbass Novokuznetsk	15	(0)
2007–2008	FC Amur Blagoveshchensk	43	(1)
2009–2010	FC KUZBASS Kemerovo	44	(3)
2011	FC Amur-2010 Blagoveshchensk	17	(0)
- * Club domestic league appearances and goals

Maksim Vasilyevich Danilin (Russian: Максим Васильевич Данилин; born 1 September 1979) is a former Russian professional football player.

== Club career ==
He played in the Russian Football National League for FC Sibir Novosibirsk in 2005.

== Honours ==
- Russian Second Division Zone East best defender: 2004.
