= Danylo Ostrozky =

- Coat of arms: Ostrozky
- Died: after 1366
- Noble family: Ostrozky
- consort: Wassilisa

Danylo (Andriy) Ostrozky (Ukrainian: Данило Острозький; Polish: Daniel Ostrogski; died after 1366) was a Ruthenian nobleman, probably Prince of Turaŭ, first Prince of Ostroh, and founder of the Ostrozky House.

== Biography ==
It is not clear whether he was descendant of Pinsk–Turaŭ or Kingdom of Galicia–Volhynia branch of the Rurik dynasty. Some scholars claim that his grandfather was Vasylko Romanovych, Prince of Slonim and direct descendant of Roman of Galicia, others however claim his origin in line of Sviatopolk II of Kyiv and suppose that his father was Danylo. Kasper Niesiecki, an 18th-century writer, reported that "Danylo Vasyliovych, son of Danylo of Galicia`s brother, first started to call himself Prince of Ostroh". He could be also direct grandson of Danylo of Galicia and son of Mstyslav Danylovych.

Adam Naruszewicz wrote that Danylo Ostrozky was starost of Przemyśl, officer of Casimir III the Great when he inherited Galicia after the death of Boleslaw-Yuri II of Galicia. Danylo was probably only temporary supporting King Casimir, because in 1344 he called the Tatars to fight for Galicia in the Galicia–Volhynia Wars, like Dmytro Dedko who died in the same year. Finally Prince Danylo allied to Liubartas who also rivaled for Galicia with Tatars, Poles and Hungarians. He received Ostroh from Liubartas, King of Galicia–Volhynia, where he rebuilt the castle destroyed by the Tatars.

Was married to Wassilisa (?), father of Feodor Ostrozky and probably Wasyl.

== See also ==
- House of Ostrozky
- Dmytro Dedko
- List of szlachta
