= Daniil Ivankov =

Russian footballer

Personal information
- Full name: Daniil Sergeyevich Ivankov
- Date of birth: 29 August 1999 (age 27)
- Place of birth: Rostov-on-Don, Russia
- Height: 1.78 m (5 ft 10 in)
- Position: Midfielder

Team information
- Current team: Kyzyltash Bakhchisaray
- Number: 17

Youth career
- AF Rostov-on-Don

Senior career*
Years	Team	Apps	(Gls)
2016–2017	AF Rostov-on-Don (amateur)		
2018–2022	SKA Rostov-on-Don	52	(5)
2020–2021	→ SKA-Khabarovsk (loan)	15	(1)
2022	Kuban-Holding	17	(1)
2023–	Kyzyltash Bakhchisaray		
- * Club domestic league appearances and goals as of 13 November 2022

Daniil Sergeyevich Ivankov (Russian: Даниил Сергеевич Иванков; born 29 August 1999) is a Russian football player who plays for Kyzyltash Bakhchisaray.

== Club career ==
He made his debut in the Russian Football National League for FC SKA-Khabarovsk on 1 August 2020 in a game against FC Alania Vladikavkaz, he started the game and scored a goal on his FNL debut.
