= Danil Mamayev =

Russian ice hockey player (born 1994)

- Born: March 18, 1994 (age 31); Magnitogorsk, Russia
- Height: 6 ft 0 in (183 cm)
- Weight: 192 lb (87 kg; 13 st 10 lb)
- Position: Defence
- Shoots: Left
- team Former teams: Free agent Traktor Chelyabinsk; Beibarys Atyrau
- Playing career: 2014–present

Danil Mamayev (born March 18, 1994) is a Russian professional ice hockey defenceman.

Mamayev played 79 regular season games and eight playoff games for Traktor Chelyabinsk of the Kontinental Hockey League from 2016 to 2018. He then split the 2018–19 season with three different teams, playing in the Kazakhstan Hockey Championship for Beibarys Atyrau, the Supreme Hockey League for Yermak Angarsk and in the Chance Liga for HC RT Torax Poruba.
