= Danil Romantsev =

Russian ice hockey player

- Born: June 5, 1993 (age 33) Penza, Russia
- Height: 6 ft 3 in (191 cm)
- Weight: 212 lb (96 kg; 15 st 2 lb)
- Position: Forward
- Shoots: Left
- KHL team Former teams: Lokomotiv Yaroslavl; Neftekhimik Nizhnekamsk; Amur Khabarovsk; Sibir Novosibirsk; Avtomobilist Yekaterinburg
- Playing career: 2011–present

Danil Nikolaevich Romantsev (Романцев Даниил Николаевич; born June 5, 1993) is a Russian professional ice hockey player. He is currently under contract with Lokomotiv Yaroslavl of the Kontinental Hockey League (KHL).

== Playing career ==
Romantsev made his KHL debut playing with Lokomotiv Yaroslavl during the 2013–14 KHL season.

Romantsev briefly returned to Yaroslavl in a paper trade before returning to Amur Khabarovsk on May 16, 2017, Kapustin in exchange for Alexander Yelesin and Kirill Kapustin.

He played three seasons with HC Sibir Novosibirsk before leaving the club as a free agent following the 2020–21 season. On 7 May 2021, Romantsev agreed to a two-year contract with Avtomobilist Yekaterinburg.
