= Cooperative Investigation of the Caribbean and Adjacent Regions =

The Cooperative Investigation of the Caribbean and Adjacent Regions (CICAR) is an Intergovernmental Oceanographic Commission of UNESCO (IOC/UNESCO), a 15-nations cooperative scientific effort, which is intended to conduct oceanography operations and cooperation programs in the Gulf of Mexico and the Caribbean sea in the following themes:

- physical,
- fisheries,
- marine biology,
- geology,
- geophysics,
- meteorology.
