= Danila Matveyev =

17th-century Russian bellmaker

Danila Matveyev, also known as Nil Matveyev (Russian: Данила Матвеев, Нил Матвеев) (died c. 1651) was a prominent Russian bellmaker of the 17th century.

The information about Danila Matveyev's life and career is rather scarce. It is known that he worked at the Moscow Cannon Yard between 1622 and 1651. He was an apprentice to Kirill Samoylov, who, in turn, had once been a student of Andrey Chokhov. Danila Matveyev cast his first bells in 1622 and would receive an honorary title of "tsar's bellmaker" (государев колокольных дел мастер) in 1647 after having cast a 700-pood bell for the Ipatiev Monastery in Kostroma with his son Yemelyan Danilov. In 1651, Danila and Yemelyan began preparations for the recasting of the 800-pood Resurrection Bell (Воскресный колокол) for the Assumption belltower of the Moscow Kremlin. The casting of this bell was finished in 1652, but it was only Yemelyan Danilov's name that had been imprinted on its side. It is believed that Danila could not finish this assignment together with his son due to his death that same year.
