= Danylo =

Male given name

- Pronunciation: IPA: [dɐˈnɪlo])
- Gender: Male
- Language: Ukrainian

Origin
- Origin: Hebrew
- Meaning: God is my judge

Other names
- Variant form: Danyjila
- Derived: דָּנִיֵּאל

Danylo (Ukrainian: Дани́ло, IPA: [dɐˈnɪlo]) is a biblical Ukrainian male given name, which is a version of Daniel. The feminine Ukrainian version of this name is Danyjila (Ukrainian: Даниїла). The name means "God is my judge." It may also appear as a surname. It celebrates its name day on December 17th.

Notable people with the name include:

== Given name ==
=== Rulers ===
- Danylo of Galicia (1201–1264), first king of Ruthenia
- Danylo Apostol (1654–1734), Hetman of the Zaporizhian Host
- Danylo Ostrozky (died after 1366), Lithuanian nobleman, probably Prince of Turaŭ, first Prince of Ostroh

=== Footballers ===
- Danylo Arkusha (born 2001), Ukrainian footballer
- Danylo Beskorovaynyi (born 1999), Ukrainian footballer
- Danylo Dmytriyev (born 2002), Ukrainian footballer
- Danylo Honcharuk (born 2002), Ukrainian footballer
- Danylo Ihnatenko (born 1997), Ukrainian footballer
- Danylo Kanevtsev (born 1996), Ukrainian football goalkeeper
- Danylo Kaydalov (born 2006), Ukrainian footballer
- Danylo Kolesnyk (born 2001), Ukrainian footballer
- Danylo Kravchuk (born 2001), Ukrainian footballer
- Danylo Krevsun (born 2005), Ukrainian footballer
- Danylo Kucher (born 1997), Ukrainian football goalkeeper
- Danylo Lazar (born 1989), Ukrainian footballer
- Danylo Polonskyi (born 2001), Ukrainian footballer
- Danylo Ryabenko (born 1998), Ukrainian footballer
- Danylo Sahutkin, Ukrainian footballer
- Danylo Sikan (born 2001), Ukrainian footballer
- Danylo Sydorenko (footballer, born 1999), Ukrainian footballer
- Danylo Sydorenko (footballer, born 2003), Ukrainian footballer
- Danylo Udod (born 2004), Ukrainian footballer
- Danylo Varakuta (born 2001), Ukrainian football goalkeeper

=== Other athletes ===
- Danylo Chufarov (born 1989), Ukrainian paralympic swimmer
- Danylo Danylenko (born 1994), Ukrainian hurdler
- Danylo Dutkevych (born 1990), Ukrainian track cyclist
- Danylo Kalenichenko (born 1994), Ukrainian tennis player
- Danylo Konovalov (born 2003), Ukrainian diver
- Danylo Sapunov (born 1982), Kazakhstani and Ukrainian triathlete
- Danylo Semenykhin (born 2004), Ukrainian paralympic swimmer
- Danylo Seredin (fl. 2000), Ukrainian paralympic athlete
- Danylo Siianytsia (born 2000), Ukrainian pairs skater
- Daniil Sobchenko (1991–2011), Ukrainian-Russian professional ice hockey player

=== Other ===
- Danylo Lyder (1917–2002), Ukrainian set designer and teacher
- Danylo Matviienko (born 1990), Ukrainian operatic baritone
- Danylo Nechai (1612–1651), Ukrainian Cossack military commander during the Cossack-Polish War
- Danylo Pika (1901–1941), Ukrainian musician
- Danylo Shumuk (1914–2004), Ukrainian political activist
- Danylo Skoropadskyi (1904–1957), Ukrainian politician and Crown Prince of Ukraine
- Danylo Terpylo (1886–1919), Ukrainian military leader during the Russian Civil War
- Danylo Yanevskyi (born 1956), Ukrainian historian, journalist, TV personality and radio host

== Surname ==
- Bohdan Danylo (born 1971), Ukrainian Roman Catholic bishop in the United States
- Roman Danylo, Canadian comedian

== See also ==
- Danilo
