= 2018–19 FC Yenisey Krasnoyarsk season =

Yenisey Krasnoyarsk
2018–19 season
- Chairman: Viktor Kardashov
- Manager: Dmitri Alenichev
- Stadium: Geolog Stadium Rounds 1&3; Central Stadium
- Premier League: 16th
- Russian Cup: Round of 16 vs Lokomotiv Moscow
- Top goalscorer: League: Mikhail Kostyukov (4); All: Mikhail Kostyukov (4)
Home colours	Away colours

The 2018–19 Yenisey Krasnoyarsk season was the first season that the club will play in the Russian Premier League, the highest tier of association football in Russia. Yenisey finished the season in 16th position, being relegated back to the RFNL at the first opportunity.

== Season events ==
On 14 June, Pavel Komolov signed for Yenisey Krasnoyarsk from Amkar Perm.

On 18 June, goalkeeper David Yurchenko signed for Yenisey Krasnoyarsk.

On 25 June, Mikhail Kostyukov joined Yenisey Krasnoyarsk after his Amkar Perm contract expired, with Petar Zanev also joining from Amkar Perm the following day..

On 29 June, David Mildzikhov joined FC Khimki on loan until the end of the 2018/19 season.

On 5 July, Fegor Ogude became the fourth former Amkar Perm player to sign for Yenisey Krasnoyarsk.

On 13 July, Rade Dugalić signed for Yenisey Krasnoyarsk from Tosno.

On 13 July, Aleksei Gritsayenko signed for Yenisey Krasnoyarsk on a one-year loan deal from Krasnodar.

On 16 July, Enis Gavazaj signed from Skënderbeu Korçë with Dmitri Yatchenko signing the following day.

On 19 July, Darko Bodul signed for Yenisey Krasnoyarsk on a two-year contract.

On 20 July, Aleksandr Zotov signed for Yenisey Krasnoyarsk on a season-long loan, whilst Ali Gadzhibekov signed from Krylia Sovetov.

On 30 August, Dmitri Torbinski signed a one-year contract.

On 1 February 2019, Oleh Danchenko signed on loan from Shakhtar Donetsk for the rest of the season, whilst Aleksandr Sobolev joined on loan for the remainder of the season from Krylia Sovetov on 3 February. Also on 3 February, Arsen Khubulov signed on a permanent contract from BB Erzurumspor, whilst Babacar Sarr signed on 5 February, after his Molde FK contract was cancelled in January 2019.

== Squad ==
As of match played 26 May 2019

Number	Name	Nationality	Position	Date of birth (age)	Signed from	Signed in	Contract ends	Apps.	Goals
Goalkeepers
1	Yuri Nesterenko	(Russia)	GK	16 June 1991 (age 35)	Rubin Kazan	2018		14	0
55	David Yurchenko	(Russia)	GK	27 March 1986 (age 40)	Tosno	2018		18	0
95	Maksim Yedapin	(Russia)	GK	3 April 2000 (age 26)	loan from CSKA Moscow	2019		1	0
Defenders
2	Valery Kichin	(Kyrgyzstan)	DF	12 October 1992 (age 34)	Tyumen	2016		82	6
3	Dmitri Yatchenko	(Russia)	DF	25 August 1986 (age 40)	Krylia Sovetov	2018		24	2
12	Aleksandr Novikov	(Russia)	DF	12 October 1984 (age 42)	Ural Yekaterinburg	2017		31	2
13	Aleksei Gritsayenko	(Russia)	DF	25 May 1995 (age 31)	loan from Krasnodar	2018	2019	17	0
27	Pavel Rozhkov	(Russia)	DF	31 December 1986 (age 39)	Restavratsiya Krasnoyarsk	2016			
33	Petar Zanev	(Bulgaria)	DF	18 October 1985 (age 41)	Amkar Perm	2018		16	1
39	Maksim Vasilyev	(Russia)	DF	31 January 1987 (age 39)	Baltika Kaliningrad	2015		82	1
45	Ivan Shalonikov	(Russia)	DF	4 March 1999 (age 27)	Lada-Tolyatti	2019		0	0
63	Ali Gadzhibekov	(Russia)	DF	6 August 1989 (age 37)	Krylia Sovetov	2018		20	1
Midfielders
5	Pavel Komolov	(Russia)	MF	10 March 1989 (age 37)	Amkar Perm	2018		24	1
6	Dmitri Torbinski	(Russia)	MF	28 April 1984 (age 42)	Baltika Kaliningrad	2018	2019	14	1
7	Aleksandr Zotov	(Russia)	MF	27 August 1990 (age 36)	loan from Dynamo Moscow	2018		27	1
8	Fegor Ogude	(Nigeria)	MF	29 July 1987 (age 39)	Amkar Perm	2018		28	2
14	Maksim Semakin	(Russia)	MF	26 October 1983 (age 43)	Ufa	2017			
17	Konstantin Savichev	(Russia)	MF	6 March 1994 (age 32)	Anzhi Makhachkala	2019		27	1
21	Yegor Ivanov	(Russia)	MF	19 June 1992 (age 34)	CSKA Moscow	2014			
23	Babacar Sarr	(Senegal)	MF	15 February 1991 (age 35)	Molde	2019		13	1
77	Mikhail Kostyukov	(Russia)	MF	9 August 1991 (age 35)	Amkar Perm	2018		13	4
78	Arsen Khubulov	(Russia)	MF	13 December 1990 (age 35)	BB Erzurumspor	2019		8	0
83	Aleksandr Kharitonov	(Russia)	MF	4 April 1983 (age 43)	Sibir Novosibirsk	2016			
94	Oleh Danchenko	(Ukraine)	MF	1 August 1994 (age 32)	loan from Shakhtar Donetsk	2019	2019	11	0
Forwards
9	Aleksandr Sobolev	(Russia)	FW	7 March 1997 (age 29)	loan from Krylia Sovetov	2019	2019	10	3
10	Mikhail Komkov	(Russia)	FW	1 October 1984 (age 42)	FC Tosno	2016		60	3
11	Artur Sarkisov	(Armenia)	FW	19 January 1987 (age 39)	Mordovia Saransk	2017		56	6
20	Maksim Rudnev	(Russia)	FW	20 April 1997 (age 29)	Academy	2016		10	3
36	Stanislav Matyash	(Russia)	FW	23 April 1991 (age 35)	Neftekhimik Nizhnekamsk	2017		0	0
48	Aleksandr Kutyin	(Russia)	FW	13 February 1986 (age 40)	Tosno	2017		58	15
Out on loan
4	Shamil Gasanov	(Russia)	DF	30 July 1993 (age 33)	Tromsø	2018		13	0
15	Azim Fatullayev	(Russia)	MF	7 June 1986 (age 40)	Rostov	2015			
32	David Mildzikhov	(Russia)	DF	8 June 1994 (age 32)	Zenit-2 St.Petersburg	2017			
47	Mikhail Filippov	(Russia)	GK	10 June 1992 (age 34)	Spartak-2 Moscow	2017		36	0
Players who left during the season
9	Darko Bodul	(Croatia)	FW	11 January 1989 (age 37)	Amkar Perm	2018	2020	12	0
26	Rade Dugalić	(Serbia)	DF	5 November 1992 (age 34)	Tosno	2018		15	1
70	Enis Gavazaj	(Albania)	MF	9 August 1991 (age 35)	Skënderbeu Korçë	2018		8	0
91	Marko Obradović	(Montenegro)	FW	30 June 1991 (age 35)	Aktobe	2018		28	8
	Dmitri Tikhiy	(Russia)	DF	29 October 1992 (age 34)	Tom Tomsk	2019		0	0
	Artur Maloyan	(Russia)	MF	4 February 1989 (age 37)	Mordovia Saransk	2016		54	9
	Serder Serderov	(Russia)	FW	10 March 1994 (age 32)	Slavia Sofia	2017		35	2

== Transfers ==
=== In ===
Date	Position	Nationality	Name	From	Fee	Ref.
14 June 2018	MF	(Russia)	Pavel Komolov	Amkar Perm	Free	
18 June 2018	GK	(Russia)	David Yurchenko	Tosno	Undisclosed	
25 June 2018	MF	(Russia)	Mikhail Kostyukov	Amkar Perm	Free	
26 June 2018	DF	(Bulgaria)	Petar Zanev	Amkar Perm	Free	
5 July 2018	MF	(Nigeria)	Fegor Ogude	Amkar Perm	Free	
13 July 2018	DF	(Serbia)	Rade Dugalić	Tosno	Undisclosed	
16 July 2018	MF	(Albania)	Enis Gavazaj	Skënderbeu Korçë	Undisclosed	
17 July 2018	DF	(Russia)	Dmitri Yatchenko	Krylia Sovetov	Undisclosed	
19 July 2018	FW	(Croatia)	Darko Bodul	Amkar Perm	Free	
20 July 2018	DF	(Russia)	Ali Gadzhibekov	Krylia Sovetov	Undisclosed	
30 August 2018	MF	(Russia)	Dmitri Torbinski	Baltika Kaliningrad	Undisclosed	
19 January 2019	DF	(Russia)	Dmitri Tikhiy	Tom Tomsk	Undisclosed	
24 January 2019	MF	(Russia)	Konstantin Savichev	Anzhi Makhachkala	Undisclosed	
3 February 2019	MF	(Russia)	Arsen Khubulov	BB Erzurumspor	Undisclosed	
5 February 2019	MF	(Senegal)	Babacar Sarr	Molde	Undisclosed	

=== Out ===
Date	Position	Nationality	Name	To	Fee	Ref.
19 June 2018	DF	(Russia)	Nikita Chicherin	Krylia Sovetov	Undisclosed	
16 August 2018	FW	(Russia)	Serder Serderov	KS Cracovia	Undisclosed	
31 January 2019	MF	(Russia)	Artur Maloyan	Urozhay Krasnodar	Undisclosed	
17 February 2019	FW	(Austria)	Darko Bodul	Shakhtyor Soligorsk	Undisclosed	
19 February 2019	DF	(Russia)	Dmitri Tikhiy	Khimki	Undisclosed	

=== Loans in ===
Date from	Position	Nationality	Name	From	Date to	Ref.
14 July 2018	DF	(Russia)	Aleksei Gritsayenko	Krasnodar	End of season	
20 July 2018	MF	(Russia)	Aleksandr Zotov	Dynamo Moscow	End of season	
1 February 2019	MF	(Ukraine)	Oleh Danchenko	Shakhtar Donetsk	End of season	
3 February 2019	FW	(Russia)	Aleksandr Sobolev	Krylia Sovetov	End of season	

=== Loans out ===
Date from	Position	Nationality	Name	To	Date to	Ref.
29 June 2018	DF	(Russia)	David Mildzikhov	Khimki	End of season	
Summer 2018	MF	(Russia)	Artur Maloyan	Tyumen	Winter 2019	
Summer 2018	FW	(Russia)	Stanislav Matyash	Tyumen	Winter 2019	
16 February 2018	DF	(Russia)	Shamil Gasanov	Baltika Kaliningrad	End of Season	
19 February 2018	GK	(Russia)	Mikhail Filippov	Rotor Volgograd	End of Season	
19 February 2018	MF	(Russia)	Azim Fatullayev	Rotor Volgograd	End of Season	

=== Released ===
Date	Position	Nationality	Name	Joined	Date
12 June 2018	DF	(Russia)	Aleksandr Zhirov	Sandhausen	12 June 2018
12 June 2018	DF	(Russia)	Konstantin Garbuz	Tambov	13 June 2018
12 June 2018	DF	(Russia)	Pyotr Ten	Tom Tomsk	18 June 2018
16 June 2018	MF	(Latvia)	Vladimirs Kamešs	Liepāja	
	DF	(Serbia)	Rade Dugalić	Kairat	19 January 2019
16 January 2019	FW	(Montenegro)	Marko Obradović	Torpedo-BelAZ Zhodino	
22 February 2019	MF	(Albania)	Enis Gavazaj	Dinamo Minsk	
3 June 2019	GK	(Russia)	David Yurchenko	Shakhter Karagandy	22 January 2020
3 June 2019	GK	(Russia)	Yuri Nesterenko	Rotor Volgograd	
3 June 2019	DF	(Russia)	Dmitri Yatchenko	Dinamo Minsk	
3 June 2019	MF	(Russia)	Pavel Komolov	Nizhny Novgorod	
3 June 2019	MF	(Nigeria)	Fegor Ogude		
3 June 2019	MF	(Senegal)	Babacar Sarr	Damac	11 June 2019
3 June 2019	MF	(Russia)	Dmitri Torbinski		
3 June 2019	MF	(Russia)	Arsen Khubulov		
3 June 2019	MF	(Russia)	Mikhail Kostyukov	Tambov	
3 June 2019	FW	(Russia)	Aleksandr Kutyin	Luch Vladivostok	

== Friendlies ==
26 June 2018	Yenisey Krasnoyarsk (Russia)	1 – 1	(Bosnia and Herzegovina) Zrinjski Mostar	Moravske Toplice, Slovenia
22:30 KRAT (UTC+7)	Rozhkov 44'	Report	N.Laštro 68'	Stadium: Hotel Livada Prestige

30 June 2018	Yenisey Krasnoyarsk (Russia)	3 – 2	(Croatia) Gorica	Moravske Toplice, Slovenia
23:00 KRAT (UTC+7)	Kostyukov 36'; Rudnev 74'; Sarkisov 84'	Report	Lovrica 4'; Zwoliński 39'	Stadium: Hotel Livada Prestige

3 July 2018	Yenisey Krasnoyarsk (Russia)	0 – 2	(Russia) Ural Yekaterinburg	Moravske Toplice, Slovenia
21:00 KRAT (UTC+7)		Report	Bicfalvi 48'; Ilyin 51'	Stadium: Hotel Livada Prestige

11 July 2018	Yenisey Krasnoyarsk	2 – 1	FSK Dolgoprudny	Kratovo
21:00 KRAT (UTC+7)	Gasanov 13'; Obradović 59'	Report	Larionov 74'

16 July 2018	Yenisey Krasnoyarsk	4 – 0	Anzhi Makhachkala	Kratovo
21:00 KRAT (UTC+7)	Dugalić 16'; Komolov 39', 89'; Kostyukov 68'	Report

21 July 2018	CSKA Moscow	1 – 1	Yenisey Krasnoyarsk	Moscow
17:00 KRAT (UTC+7)	Yefremov 34'; Bijol (yellow card) 82'; Nababkin (yellow card) 90'	Report	Zanev (yellow card) 21'; Obradović 59' (pen.)	Stadium: VEB Arena

24 January 2019	Yenisey Krasnoyarsk (Russia)	3 – 0	(Romania) Viitorul Constanța	Belek, Turkey
KRAT (UTC+7)	Gadzhibekov 15'; Sarkisov 40', 44'	Report

30 January 2019	Yenisey Krasnoyarsk (Russia)	1 – 1	(Serbia) Radnički Niš	Belek, Turkey
KRAT (UTC+7)	Komkov 54'	Report	Nikolic 19'

3 February 2019	Yenisey Krasnoyarsk (Russia)	2 – 2	(Serbia) Vojvodina	Belek, Turkey
KRAT (UTC+7)	Torbinski 21'; Sobolev 75'	Report	Goal

7 February 2019	Yenisey Krasnoyarsk (Russia)	3 – 3	(Russia) Sochi	Belek, Turkey
KRAT (UTC+7)	Savichev 26'; Komkov 65' (pen.); Kutyin 86'	Report	Barsov 41'; Obolsky 58'; Gorbunov 77'

13 February 2019	Yenisey Krasnoyarsk (Russia)	4 – 0	(Kazakhstan) Shakhter Karagandy	Belek, Turkey
KRAT (UTC+7)	Sarkisov 71', 73', 87'; Ogude 89'	Report

17 February 2019	Yenisey Krasnoyarsk (Russia)	2 – 1	(Denmark) Silkeborg	Belek, Turkey
KRAT (UTC+7)	Torbinski 38'; Sobolev 90' (pen.)	Report	Helskjaer 49'

20 February 2019	Yenisey Krasnoyarsk (Russia)	0 – 0	(Georgia (country)) Dinamo Batumi	Belek, Turkey
KRAT (UTC+7)		Report

21 February 2019	Yenisey Krasnoyarsk (Russia)	5 – 3	(Georgia (country)) Dinamo Batumi	Belek, Turkey
KRAT (UTC+7)	Torbinski 11', 52', 85'; Sarkisov 22'; Kichin 76'	Report	Goal

26 February 2019	Yenisey Krasnoyarsk (Russia)	–	(Russia) Sochi	Belek, Turkey
19:00 KRAT (UTC+7)

== Competitions ==
=== Premier League ===
==== Results by round ====
Round	1	2	3	4	5	6	7	8	9	10	11	12	13	14	15	16	17	18	19	20	21	22	23	24	25	26	27	28	29	30
Ground	H	A	H	A	H	H	A	H	A	H	A	H	A	A	A	H	A	H	A	A	H	A	H	A	H	A	H	H	H	A
Result	L	L	D	L	W	D	L	L	L	L	D	L	L	L	W	D	L	D	L	L	D	L	D	L	W	L	W	L	D	L
Position	16	16	16	16	15	13	13	16	16	16	16	16	16	16	16	16	16	16	16	16	16	16	16	16	16	16	16	16	16	16

Updated to match(es) played on 26 May 2019. Source: See Results
A = Away; H = Home; W = Win; D = Draw; L = Loss

==== Results ====
29 July 2018 1	Yenisey Krasnoyarsk	0 – 2	Zenit St.Petersburg	Tyumen
18:00 KRAT (UTC+7)	Dugalić (yellow card) 23'; Yatchenko (yellow card) 67'	Report	Ivanović (yellow card) 32'; Smolnikov (yellow card) 45'; Dzyuba 81'; Kuzyayev 85'	Stadium: Geolog Stadium; Attendance: 10,724; Referee: Vladimir Moskalev
Note: Match played at the Geolog Stadium in Tyumen, due renovation work at Yenisey Krasnoyarsk's Central Stadium in Krasnoyarsk.

6 August 2018 2	Akhmat Grozny	1 – 0	Yenisey Krasnoyarsk	Grozny
01:30 KRAT (UTC+7)	Pliyev (yellow card) 52'; Ivanov 60' (yellow card) 77'; Utsiyev (yellow card) 90+3'	Report	Gasanov (yellow card) 38' (red card) 45'; Ogude (yellow card) 56'	Stadium: Akhmat-Arena; Attendance: 14,823; Referee: Aleksey Eskov

11 August 2018 3	Yenisey Krasnoyarsk	1 – 1	CSKA Moscow	Tyumen
20:30 KRAT (UTC+7)	Ogude (yellow card) 51'; Kostyukov 58'; Gadzhibekov (yellow card) 64'	Report	Nababkin (red card) 50'; Hernández 79' (pen.)	Stadium: Geolog Stadium; Attendance: 11,209; Referee: Roman Galimov
Note: Match played at the Geolog Stadium in Tyumen, due renovation work at Yenisey Krasnoyarsk's Central Stadium in Krasnoyarsk.

20 August 2018 4	Rostov	4 – 0	Yenisey Krasnoyarsk	Rostov-on-Don
01:30 KRAT (UTC+7)	Sigurðarson 31', 35'; Wilusz (yellow card) 57'; Ionov 58'; Skopintsev (yellow card) 60'; Guliyev 83'	Report	Dugalić (yellow card) 57'	Stadium: Rostov Arena; Attendance: 21,850; Referee: Vitali Meshkov

27 August 2018 5	Yenisey Krasnoyarsk	1 – 0	Krylya Sovetov	Tyumen
21:30 KRAT (UTC+7)	Obradović (yellow card) 35'; Bodul (yellow card) 38'; Kostyukov 44'; Kutyin (yellow card) 85'; Yurchenko (yellow card) 88'	Report	Lanin (yellow card) 31' (yellow-red card) 34'	Stadium: Geolog Stadium; Attendance: 1,510; Referee: Mikhail Vilkov
Note: Match played at the Geolog Stadium in Tyumen, due renovation work at Yenisey Krasnoyarsk's Central Stadium in Krasnoyarsk.

2 September 2018 6	Yenisey Krasnoyarsk	0 – 0	Arsenal Tula	Tyumen
18:00 KRAT (UTC+7)	Ogude (yellow card) 77'; Torbinski (yellow card) 90+3'	Report	Kostadinov (yellow card) 65'; Denisov (yellow card) 70'	Stadium: Geolog Stadium; Attendance: 1,285; Referee: Sergey Ivanov
Note: Match played at the Geolog Stadium in Tyumen, due renovation work at Yenisey Krasnoyarsk's Central Stadium in Krasnoyarsk.

15 September 2018 7	Rubin Kazan	1 – 0	Yenisey Krasnoyarsk	Kazan
18:00 KRAT (UTC+7)	Poloz 6'; Chico (yellow card) 64'; Granat (yellow card) 69'	Report	Dugalić (yellow card) 40'; Ogude (yellow card) 50'	Stadium: Kazan Arena; Attendance: 8,903; Referee: Vladislav Bezborodov

22 September 2018 8	Yenisey Krasnoyarsk	1 – 2	Ural Yekaterinburg	Krasnoyarsk
15:30 KRAT (UTC+7)	Zanev 59'	Report	Dimitrov (yellow card) 17'; Semakin 25' (o.g.); Ilyin 58'; Boumal (yellow card) 63'	Stadium: Central Stadium; Attendance: 12,098; Referee: Vitali Meshkov

29 September 2018 9	Ufa	2 – 1	Yenisey Krasnoyarsk	Ufa
20:30 KRAT (UTC+7)	Sysuyev (yellow card) 35'; Krotov 46' (yellow card) 63'; Igboun 69'	Report	Kostyukov 35'; Zotov (yellow card) 55'; Ogude (yellow card) 57'; Komolov (yellow card) 77'	Stadium: Neftyanik Stadium; Attendance: 3,187; Referee: Sergey Ivanov

7 October 2018 10	Yenisey Krasnoyarsk	2 – 3	Spartak Moscow	Krasnoyarsk
15:30 KRAT (UTC+7)	Zanev (yellow card) 15'; Dugalić 51' (yellow card) 58'; Yatchenko (yellow card) 61'; Kichin 69' (pen.); Fatullayev (yellow card) 79'	Report	Lomovitsky (yellow card) 18'; Zé Luís (yellow card) 45+1' (goal) 59' (pen.); Ignatov 47'; Bocchetti (yellow card) 68'; Timofeyev 90+2'	Stadium: Central Stadium; Attendance: 14,915; Referee: Sergey Lapochkin

20 October 2018 11	Orenburg	0 – 0	Yenisey Krasnoyarsk	Orenburg
15:30 KRAT (UTC+7)	Popović (yellow card) 40'	Report	Gritsayenko (yellow card) 44'	Stadium: Gazovik Stadium; Attendance: 4,422; Referee: Nikolay Voloshin

28 October 2018 12	Yenisey Krasnoyarsk	0 – 3	Lokomotiv Moscow	Krasnoyarsk
18:00 KRAT (UTC+7)	Sarkisov (yellow card) 6'; Zotov (yellow card) 41'	Report	Al.Miranchuk 22'; Krychowiak (yellow card) 45'; Krychowiak (yellow card) 48'; Fernandes 81'; Eder 84'; Tarasov (yellow card) 90+5'	Stadium: Central Stadium; Attendance: 11,436; Referee: Vladislav Bezborodov

5 November 2018 13	Anzhi Makhachkala	2 – 1	Yenisey Krasnoyarsk	Kaspiysk
23:00 KRAT (UTC+7)	Udaly (yellow card) 19'; Ponce 35' (pen.), 57' (pen.); Chancellor (yellow card) 65'; Glebov (yellow card) 78'	Report	Komkov (yellow card) 34'; Sarkisov 53'; Obradović (yellow card) 73'; Zotov (yellow card) 88'; Yurchenko (yellow card) 90+1'	Stadium: Anzhi Arena; Attendance: 3,050; Referee: Aleksei Matyunin

11 November 2018 14	Krasnodar	3 – 0	Yenisey Krasnoyarsk	Krasnodar
20:00 KRAT (UTC+7)	Spajić (yellow card) 22'; Gazinsky 60'; Claesson 70'; Kaboré 85'	Report	Torbinski (yellow card) 18'	Stadium: Krasnodar Stadium; Attendance: 15,167; Referee: Aleksei Eskov

24 November 2018 15	Dynamo Moscow	1 – 2	Yenisey Krasnoyarsk	Khimki
18:00 KRAT (UTC+7)	Yevgenyev (yellow card) 25'; Tetteh (yellow card) 37'; Joãozinho 53' (pen.); Cardoso (yellow card) 70'; Morozov (yellow card) 87' (yellow-red card) 89'	Report	Komkov 3'; Zanev (yellow card) 45+4'; Yatchenko 55'; Obradović (yellow card) 90+2'	Stadium: Arena Khimki; Attendance: 4,133; Referee: Vasili Kazartsev

1 December 2018 16	Yenisey Krasnoyarsk	1 – 1	Akhmat Grozny	Krasnoyarsk
18:00 KRAT (UTC+7)	Ogude (yellow card) 36'; Kichin 81' (pen.); Komkov (yellow card) 90+1'	Report	Semyonov (yellow card) 30'; Gashchenkov (yellow card) 33'; Mohammadi 69'; Rodolfo (yellow card) 81'	Stadium: Central Stadium; Attendance: 1,859; Referee: Vitali Meshkov

8 December 2018 17	CSKA Moscow	2 – 1	Yenisey Krasnoyarsk	Moscow
19:00 KRAT (UTC+7)	Shchennikov 4'; Vlašić 15'; Nababkin (yellow card) 61'	Report	Komolov 54'; Zotov (yellow card) 60'; Kichin (penalty missed) 62'; Torbinski (yellow card) 65'; Zanev (yellow card) 90+4'	Stadium: VEB Arena; Attendance: 9,013; Referee: Sergey Lapochkin

3 March 2019 18	Yenisey Krasnoyarsk	1 – 1	Rostov	Sochi
18:00 KRAT (UTC+7)	Gadzhibekov (yellow card) 23'; Khubulov (yellow card) 76'; Sobolev (yellow card) 80'; Sarr 83'; Danchenko (yellow card) 90+4'	Report	Normann (yellow card) 40'; Sigurðarson 68'	Stadium: Fisht Olympic Stadium; Attendance: 5,116; Referee: Aleksei Matyunin

9 March 2019 19	Krylia Sovetov	4 – 0	Yenisey Krasnoyarsk	Samara
18:00 KRAT (UTC+7)	Poluyakhtov (yellow card) 14'; Anton 37' (pen.); Kanunnikov 60'; Kornilenko 62' (pen.); Sheydayev 81'	Report	Ogude (yellow card) 34'; Torbinski (yellow card) 56'; Sarr (yellow card) 62'; Khubulov (yellow card) 87'	Stadium: Samara Arena; Attendance: 9,376; Referee: Sergey Lapochkin

16 March 2019 20	Arsenal Tula	2 – 0	Yenisey Krasnoyarsk	Tula
23:00 KRAT (UTC+7)	Đorđević (yellow card) 9'; Mirzov 29'; Gorbatenko (yellow card) 58' (goal) 87'; Tkachyov (yellow card) 59'; Levashov (yellow card) 71'	Report	Savichev (yellow card) 17'; Yatchenko (yellow card) 69'	Stadium: Arsenal Stadium; Attendance: 8,957; Referee: Vasiliy Kazartsev

30 March 2019 21	Yenisey Krasnoyarsk	1 – 1	Rubin Kazan	Krasnoyarsk
15:30 KRAT (UTC+7)	Ogude (yellow card) 42' (yellow-red card) 43'; Gadzhibekov 72'; Sobolev (yellow card) 90+5'	Report	Sorokin (yellow card) 20'; Podberyozkin (yellow card) 22'; Ustinov (yellow card) 45+1'; Uremović (yellow card) 47'; Bayramyan 59' (yellow card) 90+1'; Konovalov (yellow card) 68'	Stadium: Central Stadium; Attendance: 7,804; Referee: Vitali Meshkov

7 April 2019 22	Ural Yekaterinburg	3 – 2	Yenisey Krasnoyarsk	Yekaterinburg
18:00 KRAT (UTC+7)	Strandberg (yellow card) 13'; Dimitrov 72'; Pogrebnyak 85'; Panyukov 86'	Report	Yatchenko 21' (pen.); Torbinski (yellow card) 25'; Zotov 63'; Danchenko (yellow card) 83'; Kostyukov (yellow card) 90+2'	Stadium: Central Stadium; Attendance: 11,778; Referee: Evgeny Turbin

13 April 2019 23	Yenisey Krasnoyarsk	0 – 0	Ufa	Krasnoyarsk
15:30 KRAT (UTC+7)	Kichin (yellow card) 17'	Report	Thill (penalty missed) 7'; Carp (yellow card) 15'; Zhivoglyadov (yellow card) 45'	Stadium: Central Stadium; Attendance: 6,778; Referee: Sergei Karasev

21 April 2019 24	Spartak Moscow	2 – 0	Yenisey Krasnoyarsk	Moscow
23:00 KRAT (UTC+7)	Guliyev (yellow card) 21' (goal) 83'; Gigot (yellow card) 37'; Rasskazov 45+1'	Report	Danchenko (yellow card) 32'	Stadium: Otkritie Arena; Attendance: 26,655; Referee: Sergey Ivanov

25 April 2019 25	Yenisey Krasnoyarsk	2 – 1	Orenburg	Krasnoyarsk
20:00 KRAT (UTC+7)	Sobolev 36' (pen.); Khubulov (yellow card) 84'; Ogude (yellow card) 90'; Kutyin 90+3'	Report	Popović (yellow card) 31'; Oyewole (yellow card) 32'; Chirkin (yellow card) 35' (yellow-red card) 64'; Sutormin (yellow card) 45'; S.Kozlov (yellow card) 64'; Sivakow (yellow card) 76'; Despotović 80'	Stadium: Central Stadium; Attendance: 5,709; Referee: Vasili Kazartsev

28 April 2019 26	Lokomotiv Moscow	2 – 1	Yenisey Krasnoyarsk	Moscow
18:00 KRAT (UTC+7)	Kichin 67' (o.g.); Barinov (yellow card) 75'; Farfán 88'	Report	Khubulov (yellow card) 31'; Gritsayenko (yellow card) 41'; Kichin (yellow card) 54'; Zotov (yellow card) 81'; Kostyukov 84'	Stadium: RZD Arena; Attendance: 10,062; Referee: Sergey Lapochkin

3 May 2019 27	Yenisey Krasnoyarsk	3 – 1	Anzhi Makhachkala	Krasnoyarsk
18:00 KRAT (UTC+7)	Torbinski (yellow card) 8'; Komkov (yellow card) 26'; Sobolev 63', 66'; Ogude 82'	Report	Gapon (yellow card) 4'; Ponce (yellow card) 12'; Gigolayev (yellow card) 28' (yellow-red card) 58'; Dolgov 35'; Akhyadov (yellow card) 39'; Ondoua (yellow card) 79'	Stadium: Central Stadium; Attendance: 7,418; Referee: Pavel Kukuyan

11 May 2019 28	Yenisey Krasnoyarsk	0 – 4	Krasnodar	Krasnoyarsk
18:00 KRAT (UTC+7)	Khubulov (yellow card) 75'	Report	Claesson 31'; Gazinsky 36'; Pereyra (yellow card) 51'; Ignatyev 78'; Suleymanov 87'	Stadium: Central Stadium] Attendance: 10,409; Referee: Aleksei Matyunin

19 May 2019 29	Yenisey Krasnoyarsk	2 – 2	Dynamo Moscow	Krasnoyarsk
18:00 KRAT (UTC+7)	Kutyin 40' (pen.), 87'; Danchenko (yellow card) 64'	Report	Joãozinho 35' (pen.); Šunjić (yellow card) 55'; Yusupov 83'	Stadium: Central Stadium; Attendance: 7,568; Referee: Mikhail Vilkov

26 May 2019 30	Zenit St.Petersburg	4 – 1	Yenisey Krasnoyarsk	Saint Petersburg
18:00 KRAT (UTC+7)	Azmoun 26' (pen.); Yerokhin (yellow card) 50' (goal) 60'; Driussi 57', 71'	Report	Kutyin (yellow card) 25'; Torbinski 84'	Stadium: Krestovsky Stadium; Attendance: 50,073; Referee: Aleksey Sukhoy

==== League table ====
Pos	Team	Pld	W	D	L	GF	GA	GD	Pts	Qualification or relegation
12	Dynamo Moscow	30	6	15	9	28	28	0	33	
13	Krylia Sovetov Samara (O)	30	8	4	18	25	46	−21	28	Qualification for the Relegation play-offs
14	Ufa (O)	30	5	11	14	24	34	−10	26	Qualification for the Relegation play-offs
15	Anzhi Makhachkala (R)	30	5	6	19	13	50	−37	21	Relegation to Football National League
16	Yenisey Krasnoyarsk (R)	30	4	8	18	24	55	−31	20	Relegation to Football National League

Updated to match(es) played on 26 May 2019. Source: Russian Premier League, Soccerway
Rules for classification: 1) Points; 2) Head-to-head points; 3) Head-to-head matches won; 4) Head-to-head goal difference; 5) Head-to-head goals scored; 6) Head-to-head away goals; 7) Matches won; 8) Goal difference; 9) Goals scored; 10) Away goals scored; 11) Play-off.
(O) Play-off winner; (R) Relegated

=== Russian Cup ===
26 September 2018 Round of 32	Luki-Energiya Velikiye Luki	1 – 2	Yenisey Krasnoyarsk	Velikiye Luki
21:30 KRAT (UTC+7)	Sagirov 5'	Report	Ovsyankin 35' (o.g.); Obradović (yellow card) 36'; Ogude (yellow card) 70' (goal) 87'	Stadium: Stadion Ekspress; Attendance: 3,500; Referee: Vasilly Kazartsev

31 October 2018 Round of 16	Lokomotiv Moscow	4 – 1	Yenisey Krasnoyarsk	Moscow
23:30 KRAT (UTC+7)	Eder 13' (pen.); An.Miranchuk 40', 57'; Al.Miranchuk 48'; Krychowiak (yellow card) 60' (red card) 71'; Fernandes (yellow card) 68'; Tugarev (yellow card) 77'; Rotenberg (yellow card) 90+2'	Report	Dugalić (yellow card) 12'; Komkov (yellow card) 75'; Kutyin 84' (pen.)	Stadium: RZD Arena; Attendance: 8,276; Referee: Aleksey Sukhoy

== Squad statistics ==
As of match played 26 May 2019

=== Appearances and goals ===
No.	Pos	Nat	Player	Total		Premier League		Russian Cup	
No.	Pos	Nat	Player	Apps	Goals	Apps	Goals	Apps	Goals
1	GK	(Russia) RUS	Yuri Nesterenko	10	0	10	0	0	0
2	DF	(Kyrgyzstan) KGZ	Valery Kichin	27	2	25+1	2	1	0
3	DF	(Russia) RUS	Dmitri Yatchenko	24	2	22	2	2	0
5	MF	(Russia) RUS	Pavel Komolov	24	1	15+7	1	1+1	0
6	MF	(Russia) RUS	Dmitri Torbinski	14	1	12+2	1	0	0
7	MF	(Russia) RUS	Aleksandr Zotov	27	1	22+3	1	1+1	0
8	MF	(Nigeria) NGR	Fegor Ogude	28	2	26	1	2	1
9	FW	(Russia) RUS	Aleksandr Sobolev	10	3	7+3	3	0	0
10	FW	(Russia) RUS	Mikhail Komkov	21	1	12+7	1	0+2	0
11	FW	(Armenia) ARM	Artur Sarkisov	25	1	14+9	1	2	0
13	DF	(Russia) RUS	Aleksei Gritsayenko	17	0	13+2	0	1+1	0
14	MF	(Russia) RUS	Maksim Semakin	11	0	8+3	0	0	0
17	MF	(Russia) RUS	Konstantin Savichev	8	0	5+3	0	0	0
23	MF	(Senegal) SEN	Babacar Sarr	13	1	13	1	0	0
27	DF	(Russia) RUS	Pavel Rozhkov	4	0	2+2	0	0	0
33	DF	(Bulgaria) BUL	Petar Zanev	16	1	14+1	1	1	0
48	FW	(Russia) RUS	Aleksandr Kutyin	20	4	12+6	3	1+1	1
55	GK	(Russia) RUS	David Yurchenko	18	0	17	0	1	0
63	DF	(Russia) RUS	Ali Gadzhibekov	20	1	20	1	0	0
77	MF	(Russia) RUS	Mikhail Kostyukov	13	4	8+5	4	0	0
78	MF	(Russia) RUS	Arsen Khubulov	8	0	3+5	0	0	0
83	MF	(Russia) RUS	Aleksandr Kharitonov	5	0	5	0	0	0
94	MF	(Ukraine) UKR	Oleh Danchenko	11	0	11	0	0	0
95	GK	(Russia) RUS	Maksim Yedapin	1	0	0+1	0	0	0
Players away from the club on loan:
4	DF	(Russia) RUS	Shamil Gasanov	4	0	3	0	1	0
15	MF	(Russia) RUS	Azim Fatullayev	12	0	7+3	0	2	0
47	GK	(Russia) RUS	Mikhail Filippov	4	0	3	0	1	0
Players who left Yenisey Krasnoyarsk during the season:
9	FW	(Croatia) CRO	Darko Bodul	12	0	7+3	0	2	0
26	DF	(Serbia) SRB	Rade Dugalić	15	1	14	1	1	0
70	MF	(Albania) ALB	Enis Gavazaj	8	0	2+5	0	1	0
91	FW	(Montenegro) MNE	Marko Obradović	14	0	2+11	0	1	0

=== Goal Scorers ===
Place	Position	Nation	Number	Name	Premier League	Russian Cup	Total
1	MF	(Russia)	77	Mikhail Kostyukov	4	0	4
1	FW	(Russia)	48	Aleksandr Kutyin	3	1	4
3	FW	(Russia)	9	Aleksandr Sobolev	3	0	3
4	DF	(Kyrgyzstan)	2	Valery Kichin	2	0	2
4	DF	(Russia)	3	Dmitri Yatchenko	2	0	2
4	MF	(Nigeria)	8	Fegor Ogude	1	1	2
7	DF	(Bulgaria)	33	Petar Zanev	1	0	1
7	DF	(Serbia)	26	Rade Dugalić	1	0	1
7	FW	(Armenia)	11	Artur Sarkisov	1	0	1
7	FW	(Russia)	10	Mikhail Komkov	1	0	1
7	MF	(Russia)	5	Pavel Komolov	1	0	1
7	MF	(Senegal)	23	Babacar Sarr	1	0	1
7	DF	(Russia)	63	Ali Gadzhibekov	1	0	1
7	MF	(Russia)	7	Aleksandr Zotov	1	0	1
7	MF	(Russia)	6	Dmitri Torbinski	1	0	1
7				Own goal	0	1	1
				TOTALS	24	3	27

=== Disciplinary record ===
Number	Nation	Position	Name	Premier League		Russian Cup		Total	
Number	Nation	Position	Name	Yellow card	Red card	Yellow card	Red card	Yellow card	Red card
2	(Kyrgyzstan)	DF	Valery Kichin	2	0	0	0	2	0
3	(Russia)	DF	Dmitri Yatchenko	3	0	0	0	3	0
5	(Russia)	MF	Pavel Komolov	1	0	0	0	1	0
6	(Russia)	MF	Dmitri Torbinski	6	0	0	0	6	0
7	(Russia)	MF	Aleksandr Zotov	5	0	0	0	5	0
8	(Nigeria)	MF	Fegor Ogude	10	1	1	0	11	1
9	(Russia)	FW	Aleksandr Sobolev	2	0	0	0	2	0
10	(Russia)	FW	Mikhail Komkov	3	0	1	0	4	0
11	(Armenia)	FW	Artur Sarkisov	1	0	0	0	1	0
13	(Russia)	DF	Aleksei Gritsayenko	2	0	0	0	2	0
17	(Russia)	MF	Konstantin Savichev	1	0	0	0	1	0
23	(Senegal)	MF	Babacar Sarr	1	0	0	0	1	0
33	(Bulgaria)	DF	Petar Zanev	3	0	0	0	3	0
48	(Russia)	FW	Aleksandr Kutyin	2	0	0	0	2	0
55	(Russia)	GK	David Yurchenko	2	0	0	0	2	0
63	(Russia)	DF	Ali Gadzhibekov	2	0	0	0	2	0
77	(Russia)	MF	Mikhail Kostyukov	2	0	0	0	2	0
78	(Russia)	MF	Arsen Khubulov	5	0	0	0	5	0
94	(Ukraine)	MF	Oleh Danchenko	4	0	0	0	4	0
Players away on loan:
4	(Russia)	DF	Shamil Gasanov	1	1	0	0	1	1
15	(Russia)	MF	Azim Fatullayev	1	0	0	0	1	0
Players who left Yenisey Krasnoyarsk during the season:
9	(Croatia)	FW	Darko Bodul	1	0	0	0	1	0
26	(Serbia)	DF	Rade Dugalić	4	0	1	0	5	0
91	(Montenegro)	FW	Marko Obradović	3	0	1	0	4	0
			TOTALS	67	2	4	0	71	2
