= 2019–20 FC Zenit Saint Petersburg season =

FC Zenit Saint Petersburg
2019–20 season
- Chairman: Aleksander Medvedev
- Manager: Sergei Semak
- Stadium: Gazprom Arena
- Premier League: 1st
- Russian Cup: Champions
- Super Cup: Runners-up
- Champions League: Group stage
- Top goalscorer: League: Sardar Azmoun & Artem Dzyuba (17); All: Sardar Azmoun & Artem Dzyuba (21)
- Highest home attendance: 54,078 (vs. Krasnodar, 3 August 2019, Russian Premier League)
- Lowest home attendance: 42,431 (vs. Arsenal Tula, 13 September 2019, Russian Premier League)
Home colours	Away colours

The 2019–20 Zenit Saint Petersburg season was the 95th season in the club's history and its 24th consecutive season in the Russian Premier League. Zenit are the defending Premier League champions and as such participate in the UEFA Champions League group stage as well as the Super Cup and the Russian Cup.

== Season events ==
20 June, goalkeeper Igor Obukhov joined SKA-Khabarovsk on a season-long loan.

On 25 June, Zenit announced that Aleksandr Anyukov had retired from playing, and had taken up a coaching role with the club. On 10 June, Zenit announced that Claudio Marchisio had left the club after his contract was terminated by mutual consent.

On 4 July, Zenit announced the signing of Douglas Santos from Hamburger SV on a five-year contract, the departure of Dmitry Poloz to Sochi for an undisclosed fee, and the loan move of Daniil Lesovoy to Arsenal Tula until the end of the season.

On 5 July, Zenit announced that Mikhail Kerzhakov and Yuri Zhirkov had both signed new one-year contract with the club, keeping them at Zenit until the end of the 2019/20 season.

On 8 July, Zenit announced the signing of Aleksei Sutormin on a 3-year contract, with the option of a 1-year extension, from Rubin Kazan, and the departure of Elmir Nabiullin to Sochi.

On 12 July, Hernani joined Parma on a season-long loan deal, and Yegor Baburin moved permanently to Rostov.

On 13 July, Aleksandr Anyukov came out of retirement to join Krylia Sovetov Samara on loan for the 2019–20 season.

On 18 July, Aleksandr Yerokhin extended his contract with Zenit for another three-years. The following day, 19 July, Andrei Mostovoy moved to Sochi on a season-long loan deal.

On 23 July, Zenit announced the return of Aleksandr Vasyutin on a four-year contract from Sarpsborg 08

On 2 August, Zenit announced the signing of Malcom on a five-year contract from Barcelona.

On 5 August, Zenit announced that Christian Noboa had left the club to sign for Sochi on a permanent transfer, with Anton Zabolotny making the same move three days later.

On 12 August, Luka Đorđević left Zenit to sign for Lokomotiv Moscow on a permanent transfer.

On 21 August, Zenit announced the signing of Danil Krugovoy on a five-year contract from FC Ufa, with the defender staying in Ufa on loan for the remainder of the season.

On 29 August, Zenit announced the signing of Vladimir Khubulov on a season-long loan from Akhmat Grozny.

On 31 August, Zenit announced the arrival of Yordan Osorio on a season-long loan deal from Porto, with the option to make the move permanent at the end of the season.

On 2 September, Vyacheslav Karavayev signed for Zenit on a four-year contract from Vitesse, and Emiliano Rigoni moved to Sampdoria on loan until the end of season, with an option to make the move permanent at the end of the season, and Miha Mevlja moved to Sochi on a permanent transfer.

Also on September, Denis Terentyev extended his contract with Zenit for an additional year, and joined Ufa on loan for the remainder of the season.

On 21 January, Kokorin scored a hat-trick for Zenit in their 10–0 victory over Qatar club Al Uwaynah, before PFC Sochi announced they had signed Kokorin on loan until the end of the season.

On 24 January, Matías Kranevitter left Zenit by mutual consent.

On 1 February, Zenit announced the return of Emiliano Rigoni from his loan deal with Sampdoria.

On 12 February, Maksim Rudakov left Zenit to sign for Rostov.

On 17 February, Zenit confirmed that Kokorin had join Sochi on loan for the remainder of the season.

On 16 March, Zenit's away game against CSKA Moscow scheduled for 22 March, was postponed after the Mayor of Moscow banned outdoor sporting events due to the COVID-19 pandemic.

On 17 March, the Russian Premier League postponed all league fixtures until April 10 due to the COVID-19 pandemic.

On 1 April, the Russian Football Union extended the suspension of football until 31 May.

On 15 May, the Russian Football Union announced that the Russian Premier League season would resume on 21 June.

== Squad ==
As of match played 25 July 2020

No.	Name	Nationality	Position	Date of birth (age)	Signed from	Signed in	Contract ends	Apps.	Goals
Goalkeepers
41	Mikhail Kerzhakov	(Russia)	GK	28 January 1987 (aged 33)	Anzhi Makhachkala	2015	2020	38	0
71	Daniil Odoyevskiy	(Russia)	GK	22 January 2003 (aged 17)	Academy	2019		0	0
78	Aleksandr Vasyutin	(Russia)	GK	4 March 1995 (aged 25)	Sarpsborg 08	2019	2023	3	0
99	Andrey Lunyov	(Russia)	GK	13 November 1991 (aged 28)	Ufa	2016	2021	104	0
Defenders
3	Douglas Santos	(Brazil)	DF	22 March 1994 (aged 26)	Hamburger SV	2019	2024	38	0
4	Yordan Osorio	(Venezuela)	DF	10 May 1994 (aged 26)	loan from Porto	2019	2020	16	0
6	Branislav Ivanović	(Serbia)	DF	22 February 1984 (aged 36)	Chelsea	2017	2020	124	11
15	Vyacheslav Karavayev	(Russia)	DF	20 May 1995 (aged 25)	Vitesse	2019	2023	31	1
19	Igor Smolnikov	(Russia)	DF	8 August 1988 (aged 31)	Krasnodar	2013		198	10
24	Emanuel Mammana	(Argentina)	DF	10 February 1996 (aged 24)	Lyon	2017	2022	41	0
44	Yaroslav Rakitskyi	(Ukraine)	DF	3 August 1989 (aged 30)	Shakhtar Donetsk	2019	2022	53	4
54	Nikita Kakkoyev	(Russia)	DF	22 August 1999 (aged 20)	Academy	2016		1	0
80	Ilya Skrobotov	(Russia)	DF	6 July 2000 (aged 20)	Academy	2017		4	1
87	Danila Prokhin	(Russia)	DF	24 May 2001 (aged 19)	Academy	2019		4	0
88	Dmitri Bogayev	(Russia)	DF	24 January 1994 (aged 26)	Palanga	2017	2020	7	0
Midfielders
5	Wílmar Barrios	(Colombia)	MF	16 October 1993 (aged 26)	Boca Juniors	2019	2023	49	2
10	Emiliano Rigoni	(Argentina)	MF	4 February 1993 (aged 27)	Independiente	2017	2021	54	12
14	Daler Kuzyayev	(Russia)	MF	15 January 1993 (aged 27)	Terek Grozny	2017	2020	93	10
17	Oleg Shatov	(Russia)	MF	29 July 1990 (aged 29)	Anzhi Makhachkala	2013		191	30
18	Yuri Zhirkov	(Russia)	MF	20 August 1983 (aged 36)	Dynamo Moscow	2016	2020	106	5
21	Aleksandr Yerokhin	(Russia)	MF	13 October 1989 (aged 30)	Rostov	2017	2022	94	17
27	Magomed Ozdoyev	(Russia)	MF	5 November 1992 (aged 27)	Rubin Kazan	2018	2022	65	5
38	Leon Musayev	(Russia)	MF	25 January 1999 (aged 21)	Academy	2016		13	0
55	Kirill Kaplenko	(Russia)	MF	15 June 1999 (aged 21)	Krasnodar	2017		3	0
84	Ilya Vorobyov	(Russia)	MF	11 July 1999 (aged 21)	Academy	2017		1	0
91	Aleksei Sutormin	(Russia)	MF	10 January 1994 (aged 26)	Rubin Kazan	2019	2022	31	5
Forwards
7	Sardar Azmoun	(Iran)	FW	1 January 1995 (aged 25)	Rubin Kazan	2019	2022	54	33
8	Malcom	(Brazil)	FW	26 February 1997 (aged 23)	Barcelona	2019	2024	15	4
11	Sebastián Driussi	(Argentina)	FW	9 February 1996 (aged 24)	River Plate	2017	2021	115	23
22	Artem Dzyuba	(Russia)	FW	22 August 1988 (aged 31)	Spartak Moscow	2015		175	73
92	Daniil Shamkin	(Russia)	FW	22 June 2002 (aged 18)	Academy	2020		4	0
Away on loan
74	Sergei Ivanov	(Russia)	MF	7 January 1997 (aged 23)	Academy	2015		1	0
	Danil Krugovoy	(Russia)	DF	28 May 1998 (aged 22)	Ufa	2019	2024	0	0
	Denis Terentyev	(Russia)	DF	13 August 1992 (aged 27)	Rostov	2017		12	0
	Hernani	(Brazil)	MF	27 March 1994 (aged 26)	Atlético Paranaense	2016	2021	36	1
	Andrei Mostovoy	(Russia)	MF	5 November 1997 (aged 22)	Khimki	2019		0	0
	Aleksandr Kokorin	(Russia)	FW	19 March 1991 (aged 29)	Dynamo Moscow	2016		93	35
	Ivan Tarasov	(Russia)	FW	30 January 2000 (aged 20)	Academy	2017		0	0
Left during the season
16	Christian Noboa	(Ecuador)	MF	9 April 1985 (aged 35)	Rostov	2017	2020	22	1
20	Róbert Mak	(Slovakia)	MF	8 March 1991 (aged 29)	PAOK	2016	2020	71	14
23	Miha Mevlja	(Slovenia)	DF	12 June 1990 (aged 30)	Rostov	2017	2021	42	1
29	Anton Zabolotny	(Russia)	FW	13 June 1991 (aged 29)	Tosno	2018	2021	43	4
32	Matías Kranevitter	(Argentina)	MF	21 May 1993 (aged 27)	Atlético Madrid	2017	2021	52	0
34	Sergei Zuykov	(Russia)	DF	19 September 1993 (aged 26)	Volgar Astrakhan	2017		0	0
71	Yegor Baburin	(Russia)	GK	9 August 1993 (aged 26)	Academy	2010		7	0
77	Luka Đorđević	(Montenegro)	FW	9 July 1994 (aged 26)	Mogren	2012		30	3
	Igor Obukhov	(Russia)	GK	29 May 1996 (aged 24)	Academy	2012		0	0
	Maksim Rudakov	(Russia)	GK	22 January 1996 (aged 24)	Academy	2012		0	0
	Aleksandr Anyukov	(Russia)	DF	28 September 1982 (aged 37)	Coaching Staff	2019		417	13
	Daniil Lesovoy	(Russia)	MF	12 January 1998 (aged 22)	Dynamo Kyiv	2016		0	0

=== Out on loan ===
Note: Flags indicate national team as defined under FIFA eligibility rules; some limited exceptions apply. Players may hold more than one non-FIFA nationality.

No.	Pos.	Nation	Player
—	GK	RUS	Igor Obukhov (at SKA-Khabarovsk)
—	DF	RUS	Danil Krugovoy (at Ufa)
—	DF	RUS	Denis Terentyev (at Ufa)
—	MF	ARG	Emiliano Rigoni (at Sampdoria)
—	MF	BRA	Hernani (at Parma)

No.	Pos.	Nation	Player
—	MF	RUS	Sergei Ivanov (at Krylia Sovetov)
—	MF	RUS	Andrei Mostovoy (at Sochi)
—	FW	RUS	Aleksandr Kokorin (at Sochi)
—	FW	RUS	Ivan Tarasov (at HJK)

== Transfers ==
=== In ===
Date	Position	Nationality	Name	From	Fee	Ref.
4 July 2019	DF	(Brazil)	Douglas Santos	Hamburger SV	Undisclosed	
8 July 2019	MF	(Russia)	Aleksei Sutormin	Rubin Kazan	Undisclosed	
13 July 2019	DF	(Russia)	Aleksandr Anyukov	Coaching Staff	Free	
23 July 2019	GK	(Russia)	Aleksandr Vasyutin	Sarpsborg 08	Undisclosed	
2 August 2019	FW	(Brazil)	Malcom	Barcelona	Undisclosed	
21 August 2019	DF	(Russia)	Danil Krugovoy	Ufa	Undisclosed	
2 September 2019	DF	(Russia)	Vyacheslav Karavayev	Vitesse	Undisclosed	

=== Loans in ===
Date from	Position	Nationality	Name	To	Date to	Ref.
29 August 2019	MF	(Russia)	Vladimir Khubulov	Akhmat Grozny	End of Season	
31 August 2019	DF	(Venezuela)	Yordan Osorio	Porto	End of Season	

=== Out ===
Date	Position	Nationality	Name	To	Fee	Ref.
27 June 2019	FW	(Russia)	Andrei Panyukov	Ural Yekaterinburg	Undisclosed	
2 July 2019	DF	(Russia)	Ivan Novoseltsev	Sochi	Undisclosed	
2 July 2019	DF	(Russia)	Ibragim Tsallagov	Sochi	Undisclosed	
4 July 2019	FW	(Russia)	Dmitry Poloz	Sochi	Undisclosed	
4 July 2019	MF	(Russia)	Vitali Gorulyov	SKA-Khabarovsk	Undisclosed	
8 July 2019	DF	(Russia)	Elmir Nabiullin	Sochi	Undisclosed	
12 July 2019	GK	(Russia)	Yegor Baburin	Rostov	Undisclosed	
5 August 2019	MF	(Ecuador)	Christian Noboa	Sochi	Undisclosed	
8 August 2019	FW	(Russia)	Anton Zabolotny	Sochi	Undisclosed	
12 August 2019	FW	(Montenegro)	Luka Đorđević	Lokomotiv Moscow	Undisclosed	
2 September 2019	DF	(Slovenia)	Miha Mevlja	Sochi	Undisclosed	
24 January 2020	DF	(Russia)	Sergei Bugriyev	Tom Tomsk	Undisclosed	
30 January 2020	MF	(Slovakia)	Róbert Mak	Konyaspor	Undisclosed	
7 February 2020	DF	(Russia)	Sergei Zuykov	Nizhny Novgorod	Undisclosed	
12 February 2020	GK	(Russia)	Maksim Rudakov	Rostov	Undisclosed	
30 June 2020	GK	(Russia)	Igor Obukhov	SKA-Khabarovsk	Undisclosed	
3 July 2020	MF	(Russia)	Daniil Lesovoy	Arsenal Tula	Undisclosed	

=== Loans out ===
Date from	Position	Nationality	Name	To	Date to	Ref.
9 November 2018	GK	(Russia)	Maksim Rudakov	HJK	31 December 2019	
25 February 2019	FW	(Russia)	Ivan Tarasov	HJK	31 December 2019	
20 June 2019	GK	(Russia)	Igor Obukhov	SKA-Khabarovsk	End of Season	
4 July 2019	MF	(Russia)	Daniil Lesovoy	Arsenal Tula	3 July 2020	
12 July 2019	MF	(Brazil)	Hernani	Parma	End of Season	
13 July 2019	DF	(Russia)	Aleksandr Anyukov	Krylia Sovetov	End of Season	
19 July 2019	MF	(Russia)	Andrei Mostovoy	Sochi	End of Season	
21 August 2019	DF	(Russia)	Danil Krugovoy	Ufa	End of Season	
2 September 2019	MF	(Argentina)	Emiliano Rigoni	Sampdoria	1 February 2020	
2 September 2019	DF	(Russia)	Denis Terentyev	Ufa	End of Season	
6 February 2020	MF	(Russia)	Sergei Ivanov	Krylia Sovetov	End of Season	
17 February 2020	FW	(Russia)	Aleksandr Kokorin	Sochi	End of Season	

=== Released ===
Date	Position	Nationality	Name	Joined	Date	Ref.
Summer 2019	GK	(Russia)	Yuri Lodygin	Gazişehir Gaziantep	3 August 2019	
Summer 2019	MF	(Russia)	Nikita Koldunov	Sochi		
25 June 2019	DF	(Russia)	Aleksandr Anyukov	Retired		
1 July 2019	MF	(Italy)	Claudio Marchisio	Retired	3 October 2019	
24 January 2020	MF	(Argentina)	Matías Kranevitter	Monterrey	26 January 2020	
28 May 2020	DF	(Russia)	Aleksandr Anyukov	Retired		

== Friendlies ==
21 June 2019	Wacker Innsbruck (Austria)	1 – 6	(Russia) Zenit St.Petersburg	Sankt Ulrich am Pillersee, Austria
19:00 MSK (UTC+3)	11'	Report	Shatov 26', 27'; Rigoni 33'; Yerokhin 59'; Zabolotny 61', 66'	Stadium: Sankt Ulrich Sports Centre

25 June 2019	Levski Sofia (Bulgaria)	0 – 1	(Russia) Zenit St.Petersburg	Sankt Ulrich am Pillersee, Austria
19:00 MSK (UTC+3)		Report	Azmoun 48' (pen.)	Stadium: Sankt Ulrich Sports Centre

29 June 2019	Budapest Honvéd (Hungary)	0 – 3	(Russia) Zenit St.Petersburg	Austria
12:00 MSK (UTC+3)		Report	Mevlja 21'; Hernani 74'; Đorđević 86' (pen.)

29 June 2019	Red Star Belgrade (Serbia)	0 – 1	(Russia) Zenit St.Petersburg	Austria
17:30 MSK (UTC+3)		Report	Azmoun 39'; Ozdoyev (yellow card) 79'

8 September 2019	Zenit St.Petersburg	2 – 1	Sochi	Saint Petersburg, Russia
14:00 MSK (UTC+3)	Sutormin 3'; Bachinsky 22'	Report	Burmistrov 36'	Stadium: Stadion SDYuShOR Smena; Attendance: 1,868

21 January 2020	Al Uwaynah (Qatar)	0 – 10	(Russia) Zenit St.Petersburg	Doha, Qatar
17:00 MSK (UTC+3)		Report	Kokorin 6', 9', 36'; Dzyuba 34', 36'; Osorio 56'; Azmoun 59', 67', 83'; Driussi 72'	Stadium: Aspire Academy; Referee: Mohamed Nasser

25 January 2020	Red Bull Salzburg (Austria)	6 – 3	(Russia) Zenit St.Petersburg	Doha, Qatar
16:00 MSK (UTC+3)	Osorio (yellow card) 4' (goal) 53'; Rakitskiy (yellow card) 7'; Kerzhakov (yellow card) 29'; Shatov 54'; Mak 76'	Report	Berisha 5'; Ramalho 33'; Hwang 34'; Adeyemi 63'; Pokorný 78'; Koïta 90'	Stadium: Aspire Academy
Note: Match consisted of 3x40mins.

1 February 2020	Zenit St.Petersburg (Russia)	4 – 0	(Luxembourg) F91 Dudelange	La Nucia, Spain
17:00 MSK (UTC+3)	Osorio 2'; Driussi 20'; Smolnikov 27'; Sutormin 84' (pen.)	Report		Stadium: Camilo Cano Stadium

6 February 2020	Zenit St.Petersburg (Russia)	4 – 0	(Georgia (country)) Saburtalo Tbilisi	Benidorm, Spain
20:30 MSK (UTC+3)	Sutormin 21'; Barrios 38'; Shatov 60'; Shamkin 62'	Report		Referee: Manuel Muñoz

9 February 2020	CSKA Moscow	2 – 3	Zenit St.Petersburg	La Nucia, Spain
16:00 MSK (UTC+3)	Bistrović 22'; Chalov 43'	Report	Dzyuba 59', 61'; Azmoun 64'	Stadium: Camilo Cano

9 February 2020	Zenit St.Petersburg	3 – 1	Leningradets Leningrad Oblast	Benidorm, Spain
18:00 MSK (UTC+3)	Rigoni 31', 43'; Vorobyov 58'	Report	D.Luchin 63'

17 February 2020	Zenit St.Petersburg	4 – 2	Alania Vladikavkaz	Belek, Turkey
11:00 MSK (UTC+3)	Yerokhin 29', 64'; Musayev (yellow card) 31'; Rigoni 45', 54'; Vorobyov (yellow card) 50'; Zhirkov (yellow card) 59'; Shamkin (yellow card) 62'	Report	Mashukov 5'; Da.Kobesov 67' (pen.)

17 February 2020	Zenit St.Petersburg (Russia)	3 – 1	(Kazakhstan) Kairat	Belek, Turkey
17:00 MSK (UTC+3)	Ozdoyev (red card) 8'; Malcom 25'; Douglas 67'; Azmoun 68'	Report	Tungyshbayev 34'

22 February 2020	Zenit St.Petersburg (Russia)	1 – 1	(Belarus) Isloch	Belek, Turkey
11:00 MSK (UTC+3)	Driussi 51'		Osorio (o.g.)

22 February 2020	Zenit St.Petersburg (Russia)	1 – 1	(Belarus) Dinamo Minsk	Belek, Turkey
17:00 MSK (UTC+3)	Zhirkov 44'		Klimovich 33'

== Competitions ==
=== Super Cup ===
6 July 2019	Zenit St.Petersburg	2–3	Lokomotiv Moscow	Moscow
19:00 MSK (UTC+3)	Azmoun 45+2', 52'; Smolnikov (yellow card) 51'; Ozdoyev (yellow card) 68' (yellow-red card) 90+2'	Report	Smolov 6'; Zhivoglyadov (yellow card) 19'; Al.Miranchuk 79', 81'	Stadium: VTB Arena; Attendance: 21,382; Referee: Sergey Lapochkin

=== Premier League ===
==== Results by round ====
Round	1	2	3	4	5	6	7	8	9	10	11	12	13	14	15	16	17	18	19	20	21	22	23	24	25	26	27	28	29	30
Ground	H	A	A	H	A	H	A	A	H	H	A	A	H	A	H	A	A	H	H	H	H	H	A	H	A	A	H	A	H	A
Result	W	W	W	D	W	D	L	W	W	W	L	W	W	W	D	W	W	W	W	D	D	W	W	W	W	W	W	D	W	W
Position	3	2	1	1	1	1	5	2	2	1	5	4	2	1	1	1	1	1	1	1	1	1	1	1	1	1	1	1	1	1

Updated to match(es) played on 22 July 2020. Source: See Results
A = Away; H = Home; W = Win; D = Draw; L = Loss

==== Results ====
14 July 2019 1	Zenit St.Petersburg	2–1	Tambov	Saint Petersburg
19:00 MSK (UTC+3)	Yerokhin 46'; Dzyuba 48'; Rakitskiy (yellow card) 60'; Barrios (yellow card) 80'	Report	Benito 71'; Appayev (yellow card) 80'; Takazov (yellow card) 88'	Stadium: Krestovsky Stadium; Attendance: 46,231; Referee: Aleksei Eskov

21 July 2019 2	Sochi	0–2	Zenit St.Petersburg	Sochi
21:30 MSK (UTC+3)	Miladinović (yellow card) 29'; Novoseltsev (yellow card) 43'	Report	Azmoun 30' (pen.); Ozdoyev 88'	Stadium: Fisht Olympic Stadium; Attendance: 35,102; Referee: Aleksei Matyunin

28 July 2019 3	Orenburg	0–2	Zenit St.Petersburg	Orenburg
14:00 MSK (UTC+3)	Kozlov (yellow card) 54'; Dovbnya (yellow card) 89'	Report	Azmoun 1'; Dzyuba 55' (pen.) (yellow card) 65'; Sutormin (yellow card) 77'; Barrios (yellow card) 80'	Stadium: Gazovik Stadium; Attendance: 6,626; Referee: Sergei Karasev

3 August 2019 4	Zenit St.Petersburg	1–1	Krasnodar	Saint Petersburg
21:30 MSK (UTC+3)	Zhirkov (yellow card) 2'; Barrios (yellow card) 28'; Dzyuba 90+1'	Report	Vilhena (yellow card) 36'; Cabella (yellow card) 54'; Ramírez (yellow card) 61'; Ari (yellow card) 89'	Stadium: Krestovsky Stadium; Attendance: 54,078; Referee: Aleksei Eskov

10 August 2019 5	Dynamo Moscow	0–2	Zenit St.Petersburg	Moscow
19:00 MSK (UTC+3)	Joãozinho (yellow card) 26'; Panchenko (yellow card) 56'; Rykov (yellow card) 60'; Yusupov (yellow card) 69' (yellow-red card) 80'	Report	Dzyuba 10'; Ozdoyev (yellow card) 35' (goal) 88'; Azmoun (yellow card) 39'; Sutormin (yellow card) 59'	Stadium: VTB Arena; Attendance: 19,095; Referee: Evgeny Turbin

17 August 2019 6	Zenit St.Petersburg	0–0	Akhmat Grozny	Saint Petersburg
19:00 MSK (UTC+3)	Smolnikov (yellow card) 24'; Ozdoyev (yellow card) 74'; Rakitskiy (yellow card) 90+4'	Report	Utsiyev (red card) 7'; Berisha (yellow card) 14'; Roshi (yellow card) 66'; Nižić (yellow card) 90+4'	Stadium: Krestovsky Stadium; Attendance: 48,468; Referee: Aleksei Matyunin

24 August 2019 7	Ufa	1–0	Zenit St.Petersburg	Ufa
16:30 MSK (UTC+3)	Fomin (yellow card) 52' (goal) 79'; Carp (yellow card) 53'; Belenov (yellow card) 76'	Report	Ozdoyev (yellow card) 35'; Yerokhin (yellow card) 46'; Ivanović (yellow card) 87'; Rakitskiy (yellow card) 90'	Stadium: Neftyanik Stadium; Attendance: 13,368; Referee: Sergey Ivanov

1 September 2019 8	Spartak Moscow	0–1	Zenit St.Petersburg	Moscow
19:00 MSK (UTC+3)	Guliyev (yellow card) 3'; Ayrton (yellow card) 15'	Report	Ozdoyev (yellow card) 27'; Zhirkov 41' (yellow card) 54'; Rigoni (yellow card) 44'; Ivanović (yellow card) 61'; Douglas (yellow card) 65'	Stadium: Otkritie Arena; Attendance: 43,482; Referee: Vitali Meshkov

13 September 2019 9	Zenit St.Petersburg	3–1	Arsenal Tula	Saint Petersburg
20:00 MSK (UTC+3)	Dzyuba 6'; Azmoun (penalty missed) 22' (yellow card) 75'; Driussi 66' (pen.); Shatov 88'	Report	Denisov (yellow card) 39'; Bauer (yellow card) 42'; Berkhamov 56'; Lutsenko (yellow card) 67'	Stadium: Krestovsky Stadium; Attendance: 42,431; Referee: Pavel Kukyan

21 September 2019 10	Zenit St.Petersburg	5–0	Rubin Kazan	Saint Petersburg
19:00 MSK (UTC+3)	Ivanović 58'; Sutormin 65', 75'; Mak 82'; Shatov 87'	Report	Mogilevets (yellow card) 90+4'	Stadium: Krestovsky Stadium; Attendance: 43,598; Referee: Sergei Karasev

28 September 2019 11	Lokomotiv Moscow	1–0	Zenit St.Petersburg	Moscow
19:00 MSK (UTC+3)	Krychowiak (yellow card) 20' (goal) 48'	Report	Kuzyayev (yellow card) 83'; Barrios (yellow card) 85'; Rakitskiy (yellow card) 90'	Stadium: RZD Arena; Attendance: 21,598; Referee: Mikhail Vilkov

6 October 2019 12	Ural Yekaterinburg	1–3	Zenit St.Petersburg	Yekaterinburg
11:30 MSK (UTC+3)	Shatov 58' (o.g.)	Report	Ivanović 3'; Ozdoyev 27'; Azmoun 63'	Stadium: Central Stadium; Attendance: 22,432; Referee: Nikolay Voloshin

19 October 2019 13	Zenit St.Petersburg	6–1	Rostov	Saint Petersburg
19:00 MSK (UTC+3)	Dzyuba 14' (pen.), 20', 80' (pen.); Ozdoyev (yellow card) 17'; Azmoun 44'; Barrios (yellow card) 56' (goal) 90+2'; Karavayev 61'; Ivanović (yellow card) 81'	Report	Hadžikadunić (yellow card) 12'; Eremenko (yellow card) 19' (goal) 83' (pen.); Chistyakov (yellow card) 78'; Chernov (yellow card) 79'	Stadium: Krestovsky Stadium; Attendance: 58,639; Referee: Sergei Karasev

27 October 2019 14	Krylia Sovetov	0–2	Zenit St.Petersburg	Samara
14:00 MSK (UTC+3)	Mijailović (yellow card) 67'; Kombarov (yellow card) 88'	Report	Karavayev (yellow card) 23'; Zhirkov 28'; Dzyuba 90+3'	Stadium: Samara Arena; Attendance: 32,560; Referee: Stanislav Vasilyev

2 November 2019 15	Zenit St.Petersburg	1–1	CSKA Moscow	Saint Petersburg
19:00 MSK (UTC+3)	Yerokhin 73'; Azmoun (yellow card) 85'; Douglas (yellow card) 90+5'; Barrios (yellow card) 90+6'	Report	Vlašić 45+1'; Bijol (yellow card) 51' (yellow-red card) 54'; Karpov (yellow card) 54'; Oblyakov (yellow card) 86'; Fernandes (yellow card) 90+6'	Stadium: Krestovsky Stadium; Attendance: 48,141; Referee: Mikhail Vilkov

10 November 2019 16	Arsenal Tula	0–1	Zenit St.Petersburg	Tula
14:00 MSK (UTC+3)	Álvarez (yellow card) 54'; Tkachyov (yellow card) 69'	Report	Karavayev (yellow card) 23'; Azmoun 63'	Stadium: Arsenal Stadium; Attendance: 16,095; Referee: Aleksei Eskov

23 November 2019 17	Rubin Kazan	1–2	Zenit St.Petersburg	Kazan
14:00 MSK (UTC+3)	Danchenko (yellow card) 51'; Sorokin (yellow card) 61'; Markov 66'; Ig.Konovalov (yellow card) 82'	Report	Azmoun 8'; Driussi (yellow card) 53'; Karavayev (yellow card) 62'; Dzyuba 79'	Stadium: Central Stadium; Attendance: 8,351; Referee: Sergey Ivanov

1 December 2019 18	Zenit St.Petersburg	1–0	Spartak Moscow	Saint Petersburg
19:00 MSK (UTC+3)	Ozdoyev (yellow card) 15' (yellow-red card) 49'; Kutepov 21' (o.g.); Shatov (yellow card) 28'	Report	Bakayev (yellow card) 29'; Kutepov (yellow card) 34'; Umyarov (yellow card) 44'; Král (yellow card) 67'; Gigot (yellow card) 75'; Schürrle (yellow card) 88'	Stadium: Krestovsky Stadium; Attendance: 55,119; Referee: Vitali Meshkov

6 December 2019 19	Zenit St.Petersburg	3–0	Dynamo Moscow	Saint Petersburg
19:30 MSK (UTC+3)	Azmoun 6'; Yerokhin (yellow card) 26'; Ivanović 35'; Dzyuba 45+1'	Report	Szymański (yellow card) 15'; Philipp (yellow card) 22'; Yusupov (yellow card) 41'	Stadium: Krestovsky Stadium; Referee: Nikolay Voloshin

29 February 2020 20	Zenit St.Petersburg	0–0	Lokomotiv Moscow	Saint Petersburg
19:00 MSK (UTC+3)	Ivanović (yellow card) 69'; Rakitskiy (yellow card) 71'; Ozdoyev (yellow card) 74'	Report	Höwedes (yellow card) 14'; Guilherme (yellow card) 32'	Stadium: Krestovsky Stadium; Attendance: 51,463; Referee: Evgeny Turbin

9 March 2020 21	Zenit St.Petersburg	0–0	Ufa	Saint Petersburg
19:00 MSK (UTC+3)	Rakitskiy (yellow card) 50'; Barrios (yellow card) 77'	Report	Putsko (yellow card) 29'; Bizjak (yellow card) 45+1'; Jokić (yellow card) 52'	Stadium: Krestovsky Stadium; Attendance: 42,191; Referee: Aleksey Sukhoy

14 March 2020 22	Zenit St.Petersburg	7–1	Ural Yekaterinburg	Saint Petersburg
16:30 MSK (UTC+3)	Azmoun 8', 15', 61'; Dzyuba 12', 72' (pen.); Malcom 27'; Driussi 69'	Report	Kalinin (yellow card) 62'; Panyukov 65' (pen.)	Stadium: Krestovsky Stadium; Attendance: 33,677; Referee: Vladimir Moskalev

20 June 2020 23	CSKA Moscow	0–4	Zenit St.Petersburg	Moscow
19:00 MSK (UTC+3)	Diveyev (yellow card) 5'; Oblyakov (yellow card) 10'; Karpov (red card) 89'	Report	Ivanović 2'; Malcom 9', 45+2'; Ozdoyev (yellow card) 50'; Yerokhin (yellow card) 81'; Barrios (yellow card) 88'; Driussi 90+4'	Stadium: VEB Arena; Attendance: 2,904; Referee: Sergey Ivanov
Note: Match originally scheduled for 22 March, before being postponed on 16 March due to the COVID-19 pandemic. with all league games being postponed on 17 March.

26 June 2020 24	Zenit St.Petersburg	2–1	Krylia Sovetov	Saint Petersburg
20:30 MSK (UTC+3)	Kuzyayev (yellow card) 21'; Ivanović (yellow card) 47'; Dzyuba 64' (pen.), 67' (pen.)	Report	Chernov (yellow card) 30'; Glushenkov 44'; Kombarov (yellow card) 52'; Timofeyev (yellow card) 62'	Stadium: Krestovsky Stadium; Referee: Pavel Kukyan
Note: Match originally scheduled for 5 April, but postponed on 17 March due to the COVID-19 pandemic.

1 July 2020 25	Tambov	1–2	Zenit St.Petersburg	Nizhny Novgorod
17:30 MSK (UTC+3)	Ciupercă (yellow card) 12' (goal) 88' (pen.); Filin (yellow card) 90+2'	Report	Azmoun 43'; Rigoni 90+1'	Stadium: Nizhny Novgorod Stadium; Referee: Mikhail Vilkov
Note: Match played at the Nizhny Novgorod Stadium in Nizhny Novgorod instead of Tambov's regular Spartak Stadium. Match originally scheduled for 12 April, but postponed on 1 April due to the COVID-19 pandemic.

5 July 2020 26	Krasnodar	2–4	Zenit St.Petersburg	Krasnodar
20:30 MSK (UTC+3)	Utkin 29', 50'; Wanderson (penalty missed) 41'; Petrov (yellow card) 46'; Olsson (yellow card) 56'; Vilhena (yellow card) 58'; Martynovich (yellow card) 60'; Berg (yellow card) 73'	Report	Azmoun 5', 52'; Barrios (yellow card) 22'; Dzyuba 45+1' (pen.); Kuzyayev (yellow card) 45+3'; Sutormin 72'; Driussi (yellow card) 78'	Stadium: Krasnodar Stadium; Referee: Sergei Karasev
Note: Match originally scheduled for 19 April, but postponed on 1 April due to the COVID-19 pandemic.

8 July 2020 27	Zenit St.Petersburg	2–1	Sochi	Saint Petersburg
18:30 MSK (UTC+3)	Dzyuba (yellow card) 2'; Musayev (yellow card) 4'; Malcom 33'; Azmoun 76'	Report	Zabolotny 5' (yellow card) 6'; Tsallagov (yellow card) 26'; Poloz (yellow card) 42'	Stadium: Krestovsky Stadium; Referee: Evgeny Turbin
Note: Match originally scheduled for 26 April, but postponed on 1 April due to the COVID-19 pandemic.

11 July 2020 28	Akhmat Grozny	1 – 1	Zenit St.Petersburg	Grozny
18:30 MSK (UTC+3)	Ivanov 6'; Ismael (yellow card) 87'	Report	Rigoni (yellow card) 10' (yellow-red card) 34'; Driussi 22'	Stadium: Akhmat-Arena; Referee: Mikhail Vilkov
Note: Match originally scheduled for 1 May, but postponed on 1 April due to the COVID-19 pandemic.

15 July 2020 29	Zenit St.Petersburg	4 – 1	Orenburg	Saint Petersburg
20:30 MSK (UTC+3)	Malykh 2' (o.g.); Ozdoyev (yellow card) 34'; Prokhin (yellow card) 53'; Azmoun 61', 77'; Shamkin (yellow card) 73'; Rakitskiy (yellow card) 75'; Dzyuba 90+1'	Report	Shakhov (yellow card) 30'; Fameyeh 32' (yellow card) 37'; Terekhov (yellow card) 65'; Škoflek (yellow card) 90'	Stadium: Krestovsky Stadium; Referee: Vitali Meshkov
Note: Match originally scheduled for 6 May, but postponed on 1 April due to the COVID-19 pandemic.

22 July 2020 30	Rostov	1 – 2	Zenit St.Petersburg	Rostov-on-Don
19:00 MSK (UTC+3)	Zaynutdinov 18'; Normann (yellow card) 42'; Hadžikadunić (yellow card) 66'; Saplinov (yellow card) 90+1'	Report	Rigoni 72'; Azmoun 75'; Shatov (yellow card) 82'	Stadium: Rostov Arena; Referee: Sergei Karasev
Note: Match originally scheduled for 17 May, but postponed on 1 April due to the COVID-19 pandemic.

==== League table ====
Pos	Team	Pld	W	D	L	GF	GA	GD	Pts	Qualification or relegation
1	Zenit Saint Petersburg (C)	30	22	6	2	65	18	+47	72	Qualification for the Champions League group stage
2	Lokomotiv Moscow	30	16	9	5	41	29	+12	57	Qualification for the Champions League group stage
3	Krasnodar	30	14	10	6	49	30	+19	52	Qualification for the Champions League play-off round
4	CSKA Moscow	30	14	8	8	43	29	+14	50	Qualification for the Europa League group stage
5	Rostov	30	12	9	9	45	50	−5	45	Qualification for the Europa League third qualifying round

Source: Russian Premier Liga, Soccerway
Rules for classification: 1) Points; 2) Head-to-head points; 3) Head-to-head matches won; 4) Head-to-head goal difference; 5) Head-to-head goals scored; 6) Matches won; 7) Goal difference; 8) Goals scored; 9) Play-off.
(C) Champions

=== Russian Cup ===
25 September 2019 Round of 32	Yenisey Krasnoyarsk	1–2	Zenit St.Petersburg	Krasnoyarsk
15:30 MSK (UTC+3)	Savichev 14'; Dolgov (yellow card) 45'; Rozhkov (yellow card) 58'; Mildzikhov (yellow card) 74'; Zotov (yellow card) 75'	Report	Smolnikov (yellow card) 23'; Sutormin 58' (pen.) (yellow card) 63'; Mak 63'	Stadium: Central Stadium; Attendance: 11,783; Referee: Nikolay Voloshin

30 October 2019 Round of 16	Zenit St.Petersburg	4–0	Tom Tomsk	Saint Petersburg
20:00 MSK (UTC+3)	Smolnikov 13'; Sutormin 56'; Yerokhin 67'; Shatov 81'	Report	Kazankov (yellow card) 41'	Stadium: Krestovsky Stadium; Referee: Igor Panin

4 March 2020 Quarter-final	Akhmat Grozny	1 – 2 (a.e.t.)	Zenit St.Petersburg	Grozny
18:00 MSK (UTC+3)	Ivanov (yellow card) 56'; Roshi 59' (pen.); Ismael (yellow card) 67'; Nenakhov (yellow card) 71'; Ángel (yellow card) 85'; Ravanelli (yellow card) 114'	Report	Rigoni 78'; Zhirkov 97'	Stadium: Akhmat-Arena; Attendance: 16,411; Referee: Nikolay Voloshin

19 July 2020 Semi-final	Zenit St.Petersburg	2 – 1	Spartak Moscow	Saint Petersburg
19:30 MSK (UTC+3)	Douglas (yellow card) 2'; Barrios (yellow card) 17'; Dzyuba 24' (pen.); Rakitskiy (yellow card) 27'; Kuzyayev 45+3' (yellow card) 81'; Ozdoyev (yellow card) 89'	Report	Gaponov (yellow card) 24'; Sobolev (yellow card) 39' (goal) 45+1'; Ayrton (yellow card) 74'; Dzhikiya (yellow card) 81'; Gigot (yellow card) 90+1'	Stadium: Krestovsky Stadium; Referee: Sergey Ivanov

==== Final ====
25 July 2020	Zenit St.Petersburg	1 – 0	Khimki	Yekaterinburg
17:00 MSK (UTC+3)	Azmoun (yellow card) 37'; Rakitskiy (yellow card) 64'; Dzyuba 83' (pen.)	Report	Dyadyun (yellow card) 35'; Bozhenov (yellow card) 39'; Barkov (yellow card) 90'; Kukharchuk (yellow card) 90+2'	Stadium: Central Stadium; Referee: Vladimir Moskalyov

=== UEFA Champions League ===
==== Group stage ====
Pos	Team	Pld	W	D	L	GF	GA	GD	Pts	Qualification
1	(Germany) RB Leipzig	6	3	2	1	10	8	+2	11	Advance to knockout phase
2	(France) Lyon	6	2	2	2	9	8	+1	8	Advance to knockout phase
3	(Portugal) Benfica	6	2	1	3	10	11	−1	7 (Note: Tied on head-to-head points (3). Head-to-head goal difference: Benfica +1, Zenit Saint Petersburg −1.)	Transfer to Europa League
4	(Russia) Zenit Saint Petersburg	6	2	1	3	7	9	−2	7	

Source: UEFA
Rules for classification: Group stage tiebreakers
Notes:

17 September 2019 1	Lyon (France)	1–1	(Russia) Zenit St.Petersburg	Décines-Charpieu, France
19:55 MSK (UTC+3)	Depay 51' (pen.); Koné (yellow card) 71'	Report	Azmoun (yellow card) 38' (goal) 41'; Rakitskiy (yellow card) 61'; Kuzyayev (yellow card) 70'; Shatov (yellow card) 87'	Stadium: Parc Olympique Lyonnais; Attendance: 47,201; Referee: Michael Oliver (England)

2 October 2019 2	Zenit St.Petersburg (Russia)	3–1	(Portugal) Benfica	Saint Petersburg, Russia
22:00 MSK (UTC+3)	Dzyuba 22'; Rakitskiy (yellow card) 44'; Dias 70' (o.g.); Azmoun 78'	Report	De Tomás 85'	Stadium: Krestovsky Stadium; Attendance: 51,683; Referee: Carlos del Cerro Grande (Spain)

23 October 2019 3	RB Leipzig (Germany)	2–1	(Russia) Zenit St.Petersburg	Leipzig, Germany
19:55 MSK (UTC+3)	Laimer 49'; Sabitzer 59'	Report	Barrios (yellow card) 8'; Rakitskiy 25'	Stadium: Red Bull Arena; Attendance: 41,058; Referee: Ali Palabıyık (Turkey)

5 November 2019 4	Zenit St.Petersburg (Russia)	0–2	(Germany) RB Leipzig	Saint Petersburg, Russia
20:55 MSK (UTC+3)	Yerokhin (yellow card) 6'; Dzyuba (yellow card) 67'; Kuzyayev (yellow card) 88'	Report	Demme 45+5'; Sabitzer 63'; Upamecano (yellow card) 67'	Stadium: Krestovsky Stadium; Attendance: 50,452; Referee: Orel Grinfeld (Israel)

27 November 2019 5	Zenit St.Petersburg (Russia)	2–0	(France) Lyon	Saint Petersburg, Russia
20:55 MSK (UTC+3)	Kuzyayev (yellow card) 16'; Dzyuba 42'; Barrios (yellow card) 57'; Ozdoyev (yellow card) 73' (goal) 84'; Rakitskiy (yellow card) 89'	Report	Andersen (yellow card) 29'; Marçal (yellow card) 43'; Dubois (yellow card) 44'	Stadium: Krestovsky Stadium; Attendance: 51,183; Referee: Daniele Orsato (Italy)

10 December 2019 6	Benfica (Portugal)	3–0	(Russia) Zenit St.Petersburg	Lisbon, Portugal
23:00 MSK (UTC+3)	Gabriel (yellow card) 19'; Cervi 47'; Pizzi 58' (pen.); Azmoun 79' (o.g.)	Report	Douglas (yellow card) 17' (yellow-red card) 56'; Yerokhin (yellow card) 43'; Ozdoyev (yellow card) 55'	Stadium: Estádio da Luz; Attendance: 40,232; Referee: Antonio Mateu Lahoz (Spain)

== Squad statistics ==
As of match played 25 July 2020

=== Appearances and goals ===
No.	Pos	Nat	Player	Total		Premier League		Russian Cup		Super Cup		Champions League	
No.	Pos	Nat	Player	Apps	Goals	Apps	Goals	Apps	Goals	Apps	Goals	Apps	Goals
3	DF	(Brazil) BRA	Douglas Santos	38	0	27+1	0	4	0	0	0	6	0
4	DF	(Venezuela) VEN	Yordan Osorio	16	0	4+3	0	2+2	0	0	0	3+2	0
5	MF	(Colombia) COL	Wílmar Barrios	35	1	25+1	1	3	0	0	0	6	0
6	DF	(Serbia) SRB	Branislav Ivanović	35	4	25	4	3	0	1	0	6	0
7	FW	(Iran) IRI	Sardar Azmoun	38	21	24+4	17	2+1	0	1	2	6	2
8	FW	(Brazil) BRA	Malcom	15	4	9+3	4	3	0	0	0	0	0
10	MF	(Argentina) ARG	Emiliano Rigoni	14	3	6+6	2	1	1	1	0	0	0
11	FW	(Argentina) ARG	Sebastián Driussi	33	4	20+5	4	0+2	0	1	0	4+1	0
14	MF	(Russia) RUS	Daler Kuzyayev	28	1	9+11	0	4	1	0	0	1+3	0
15	DF	(Russia) RUS	Vyacheslav Karavayev	31	1	17+3	1	4+1	0	0	0	4+2	0
17	MF	(Russia) RUS	Oleg Shatov	20	3	5+7	2	2+2	1	0	0	3+1	0
18	MF	(Russia) RUS	Yuri Zhirkov	27	3	13+7	2	2+2	1	1	0	1+1	0
19	DF	(Russia) RUS	Igor Smolnikov	19	1	11+1	0	2+1	1	1	0	2+1	0
21	MF	(Russia) RUS	Aleksandr Yerokhin	30	3	9+14	2	2	1	0+1	0	2+2	0
22	FW	(Russia) RUS	Artem Dzyuba	37	21	25+3	17	2	2	1	0	6	2
24	DF	(Argentina) ARG	Emanuel Mammana	4	0	2+1	0	1	0	0	0	0	0
27	MF	(Russia) RUS	Magomed Ozdoyev	36	3	26	3	2+1	0	1	0	5+1	0
38	MF	(Russia) RUS	Leon Musayev	8	0	3+4	0	0+1	0	0	0	0	0
41	GK	(Russia) RUS	Mikhail Kerzhakov	18	0	9+1	0	4	0	0	0	4	0
44	DF	(Ukraine) UKR	Yaroslav Rakitskiy	37	1	27	0	4	0	1	0	5	1
74	MF	(Russia) RUS	Sergei Ivanov	1	0	0	0	0+1	0	0	0	0	0
78	GK	(Russia) RUS	Aleksandr Vasyutin	3	0	2	0	1	0	0	0	0	0
84	MF	(Russia) RUS	Ilya Vorobyov	1	0	0	0	0+1	0	0	0	0	0
87	DF	(Russia) RUS	Danila Prokhin	4	0	3	0	0+1	0	0	0	0	0
91	MF	(Russia) RUS	Aleksei Sutormin	31	5	8+16	3	3+2	2	0	0	0+2	0
92	FW	(Russia) RUS	Daniil Shamkin	4	0	1+3	0	0	0	0	0	0	0
99	GK	(Russia) RUS	Andrey Lunyov	22	0	19	0	0	0	1	0	2	0
Players away from the club on loan:
49	DF	(Russia) RUS	Denis Terentyev	2	0	1+1	0	0	0	0	0	0	0
Players who left Zenit during the season:
16	MF	(Ecuador) ECU	Christian Noboa	1	0	0	0	0	0	1	0	0	0
20	MF	(Slovakia) SVK	Róbert Mak	10	2	0+5	1	2	1	0+1	0	0+2	0
32	MF	(Argentina) ARG	Matías Kranevitter	4	0	0+2	0	2	0	0	0	0	0
77	FW	(Montenegro) MNE	Luka Đorđević	1	0	0	0	0	0	0+1	0	0	0

=== Goal Scorers ===
Place	Position	Nation	Number	Name	Premier League	Russian Cup	Super Cup	Champions League	Total
1	FW	(Russia)	22	Artem Dzyuba	17	2	0	2	21
1	FW	(Iran)	7	Sardar Azmoun	17	0	2	2	21
3	MF	(Russia)	91	Aleksei Sutormin	3	2	0	0	5
4	DF	(Serbia)	6	Branislav Ivanović	4	0	0	0	4
4	FW	(Brazil)	8	Malcom	4	0	0	0	4
4	FW	(Argentina)	11	Sebastián Driussi	4	0	0	0	4
4	MF	(Russia)	27	Magomed Ozdoyev	3	0	0	1	4
8	MF	(Russia)	17	Oleg Shatov	2	1	0	0	3
8	MF	(Russia)	21	Aleksandr Yerokhin	2	1	0	0	3
8	MF	(Russia)	18	Yuri Zhirkov	2	1	0	0	3
8	MF	(Argentina)	10	Emiliano Rigoni	2	1	0	0	3
8				Own goal	2	0	0	1	3
12	MF	(Slovakia)	20	Róbert Mak	1	1	0	0	2
12	DF	(Russia)	15	Vyacheslav Karavayev	1	0	0	0	1
12	MF	(Colombia)	5	Wílmar Barrios	1	0	0	0	1
12	DF	(Russia)	19	Igor Smolnikov	0	1	0	0	1
12	MF	(Russia)	14	Daler Kuzyayev	0	1	0	0	1
12	DF	(Venezuela)	44	Yaroslav Rakitskiy	0	0	0	1	1
				TOTALS	65	11	2	7	85

=== Clean Sheets ===
Place	Position	Nation	Number	Name	Premier League	Russian Cup	Super Cup	Champions League	Total
1	GK	(Russia)	99	Andrey Lunyov	9	0	0	0	9
2	GK	(Russia)	41	Mikhail Kerzhakov	4	1	0	1	6
3	GK	(Russia)	78	Aleksandr Vasyutin	0	1	0	0	1
				TOTALS	12	2	0	1	15

=== Disciplinary record ===
Number	Nation	Position	Name	Premier League		Russian Cup		Super Cup		Champions League		Total	
Number	Nation	Position	Name	Yellow card	Red card	Yellow card	Red card	Yellow card	Red card	Yellow card	Red card	Yellow card	Red card
3	(Brazil)	DF	Douglas Santos	2	0	1	0	0	0	2	1	5	1
5	(Colombia)	MF	Wílmar Barrios	9	0	1	0	0	0	2	0	12	0
6	(Serbia)	DF	Branislav Ivanović	5	0	0	0	0	0	0	0	5	0
7	(Iran)	FW	Sardar Azmoun	3	0	1	0	0	0	1	0	5	0
10	(Argentina)	MF	Emiliano Rigoni	3	1	0	0	0	0	0	0	3	1
11	(Argentina)	FW	Sebastián Driussi	2	0	0	0	0	0	0	0	2	0
14	(Russia)	MF	Daler Kuzyayev	4	0	1	0	0	0	3	0	8	0
15	(Russia)	DF	Vyacheslav Karavayev	2	0	0	0	0	0	0	0	2	0
17	(Russia)	MF	Oleg Shatov	2	0	0	0	0	0	1	0	3	0
18	(Russia)	MF	Yuri Zhirkov	2	0	0	0	0	0	0	0	2	0
19	(Russia)	DF	Igor Smolnikov	1	0	1	0	1	0	0	0	3	0
21	(Russia)	MF	Aleksandr Yerokhin	3	0	0	0	0	0	2	0	5	0
22	(Russia)	FW	Artem Dzyuba	2	0	0	0	0	0	1	0	3	0
27	(Russia)	MF	Magomed Ozdoyev	10	1	1	0	2	1	2	0	15	2
38	(Russia)	MF	Leon Musayev	2	0	0	0	0	0	0	0	2	0
44	(Ukraine)	DF	Yaroslav Rakitskiy	7	0	2	0	0	0	3	0	12	0
87	(Russia)	DF	Danila Prokhin	1	0	0	0	0	0	0	0	1	0
91	(Russia)	MF	Aleksei Sutormin	2	0	1	0	0	0	0	0	3	0
92	(Russia)	FW	Daniil Shamkin	1	0	0	0	0	0	0	0	1	0
Players away on loan:
Players who left Zenit St.Petersburg during the season:
			TOTALS	63	2	9	0	3	1	17	1	92	4
