= Rozhkov =

Rozhkov (Russian: Рожков), or Rozhkova (feminine; Рожкова) is a Russian surname. Notable people with the surname include:

- Anatoli Rozhkov (b. 1972), Russian professional football coach
- Andrey Rozhkov (b. 1944), Russian diplomat
- Igor Rozhkov (b. 1981), Belarusian professional footballer.
- Mikhail Rozhkov (b. 1983), Kazakhstan football player
- Nikolai Rozhkov (1868–1927), Russian revolutionary active in the Russian Social Democratic Labour Party
- Pavel Rozhkov (b. 1986), Russian professional football player
- Poļina Rožkova (born 1985), Latvian wheelchair curler
- Sergei Rozhkov (b. 1972), Russian biathlete
- Sergei Rozhkov (footballer) (1943–2026), Soviet football player and Russian coach
