= Daniil Shamkin =

Russian footballer (born 2002)

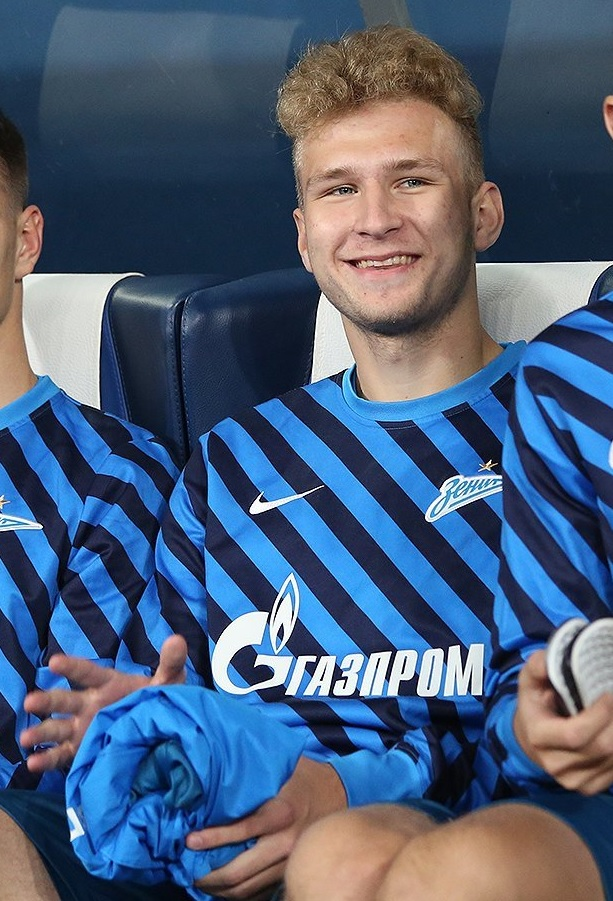
- Shamkin with Zenit Saint Petersburg in 2019

Personal information
- Full name: Daniil Dmitriyevich Shamkin
- Date of birth: 22 June 2002 (age 24)
- Place of birth: Saint Petersburg, Russia
- Height: 1.87 m (6 ft 2 in)
- Position: Midfielder

Team information
- Current team: Arsenal Tula
- Number: 8

Youth career
- 2007–2018: Zenit Saint Petersburg

Senior career*
Years	Team	Apps	(Gls)
2019–2023	Zenit Saint Petersburg	7	(0)
2019–2021	→ Zenit-2 Saint Petersburg	27	(6)
2021–2022	→ Baltika Kaliningrad (loan)	12	(0)
2022–2023	→ KAMAZ Naberezhnye Chelny (loan)	31	(5)
2023–2026	Torpedo Moscow	35	(1)
2025–2026	→ KAMAZ Naberezhnye Chelny (loan)	23	(2)
2026–	Arsenal Tula	0	(0)

International career^{‡}
2018–2019	Russia U-17	12	(2)
2019	Russia U-18	2	(0)
- * Club domestic league appearances and goals as of 16 May 2026 ‡ National team caps and goals as of 6 September 2019

Daniil Dmitriyevich Shamkin (Russian: Даниил Дмитриевич Шамкин; born 22 June 2002) is a Russian football player who plays as a midfielder for Arsenal Tula.

== Club career ==
Shamkin made his debut in the Russian Football National League for Zenit-2 Saint Petersburg on 3 March 2019 in a game against Shinnik Yaroslavl, as a starter.

He made his debut in the Russian Premier League for Zenit Saint Petersburg on 14 March 2020 in a game against Ural Yekaterinburg.

On 21 July 2021, Shamkin joined Baltika Kaliningrad on a season-long loan. On 2 July 2022, Shamkin was loaned to KAMAZ Naberezhnye Chelny.

On 10 July 2023, Shamkin joined Torpedo Moscow on a three-year contract.

== International career ==
He represented Russia at the 2019 UEFA European Under-17 Championship.

== Honours ==
Zenit Saint Petersburg

- Russian Premier League: 2019–20, 2020–21

== Career statistics ==
=== Club ===
As of 16 May 2026

Club	Season	League			Cup		Continental		Total	
Club	Season	Division	Apps	Goals	Apps	Goals	Apps	Goals	Apps	Goals
Zenit-2 Saint Petersburg	2018–19	Russian First League	4	1	–		–		4	1
Zenit-2 Saint Petersburg	2019–20	Russian Second League	13	3	–		–		13	3
Zenit-2 Saint Petersburg	2020–21	Russian Second League	9	1	–		–		9	1
Zenit-2 Saint Petersburg	2021–22	Russian Second League	1	1	–		–		1	1
Zenit-2 Saint Petersburg	Total		27	6	0	0	0	0	27	6
Zenit Saint Petersburg	2019–20	Russian Premier League	4	0	0	0	0	0	4	0
Zenit Saint Petersburg	2020–21	Russian Premier League	3	0	0	0	2 (Note: Appearances in the UEFA Champions League)	0	5	0
Zenit Saint Petersburg	Total		7	0	0	0	2	0	9	0
Baltika Kaliningrad (loan)	2021–22	Russian First League	12	0	0	0	–		12	0
KAMAZ (loan)	2022–23	Russian First League	31	5	3	0	–		34	5
Torpedo Moscow	2023–24	Russian First League	23	1	1	0	–		24	1
Torpedo Moscow	2024–25	Russian First League	6	0	0	0	–		6	0
Torpedo Moscow	2025–26	Russian First League	6	0	0	0	–		6	0
Torpedo Moscow	Total		35	1	1	0	0	0	36	1
KAMAZ (loan)	2025–26	Russian First League	23	2	4	1	–		27	3
Career total			135	14	8	1	2	0	145	15
