= Arsen Khubulov =

Russian footballer

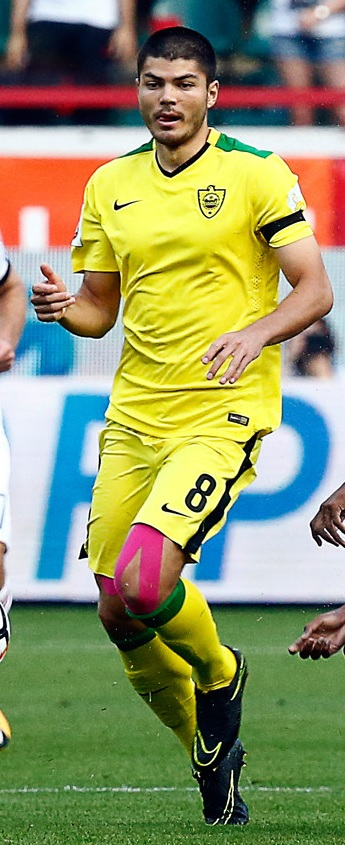
- Khubulov with Anzhi in 2017

Personal information
- Full name: Arsen Davidovich Khubulov
- Date of birth: 13 December 1990 (age 35)
- Place of birth: Vladikavkaz, Russian SFSR
- Height: 1.81 m (5 ft 11 1/2 in)
- Position: Midfielder

Youth career
- Yunost Vladikavkaz
- Konoplyov football academy

Senior career*
Years	Team	Apps	(Gls)
2008–2009	Avtodor Vladikavkaz	38	(5)
2010–2013	Alania Vladikavkaz	66	(9)
2013–2016	Kuban Krasnodar	73	(6)
2017–2018	Anzhi Makhachkala	36	(8)
2018–2019	BB Erzurumpspor	3	(0)
2019	Yenisey Krasnoyarsk	24	(1)
2020–2021	Shakhter Karagandy	31	(7)

International career
2012–2013	Russia U-21	4	(0)
- * Club domestic league appearances and goals

Arsen Davidovich Khubulov (Russian: Арсен Давидович Хубулов; born 13 December 1990) is a Russian former professional football player. He played as a right winger.

== Club career ==
He made his Russian Premier League debut for FC Alania Vladikavkaz on 10 May 2010 in a game against FC Spartak Moscow and scored the fourth goal in a 5–2 victory.

On 4 February 2019, he signed with FC Yenisey Krasnoyarsk.

On 14 February 2020, he joined Kazakhstan Premier League club FC Shakhter Karagandy.

== Career statistics ==
As of match played 13 April 2021

Club	Season	League			Cup		Continental		Other		Total	
Club	Season	Division	Apps	Goals	Apps	Goals	Apps	Goals	Apps	Goals	Apps	Goals
Avtodor Vladikavkaz	2008	PFL	8	0	1	0	–		–		9	0
Avtodor Vladikavkaz	2009	PFL	30	5	1	0	–		–		31	5
Avtodor Vladikavkaz	Total		38	5	2	0	0	0	0	0	40	5
Spartak Vladikavkaz	2010	Russian Premier League	8	1	3	0	–		–		11	1
Spartak Vladikavkaz	2011–12	FNL	44	6	1	0	4	0	–		49	6
Spartak Vladikavkaz	2012–13	Russian Premier League	14	2	0	0	–		–		14	2
Spartak Vladikavkaz	Total		66	9	4	0	4	0	0	0	74	9
Kuban Krasnodar	2013–14	Russian Premier League	14	1	1	1	5	0	–		20	2
Kuban Krasnodar	2014–15	Russian Premier League	15	0	2	0	–		–		17	0
Kuban Krasnodar	2015–16	Russian Premier League	26	2	1	0	–		–		27	2
Kuban Krasnodar	2016–17	FNL	18	3	0	0	–		–		18	3
Kuban Krasnodar	Total		73	6	4	1	5	0	0	0	82	7
Anzhi Makhachkala	2016–17	Russian Premier League	10	5	1	0	–		–		11	5
Anzhi Makhachkala	2017–18	Russian Premier League	26	3	0	0	–		1 (Note: One appearance in relegation play-offs)	0	27	3
Anzhi Makhachkala	Total		36	8	1	0	0	0	1	0	38	8
BB Erzurumspor	2018–19	Süper Lig	3	0	1	0	–		–		4	0
Yenisey Krasnoyarsk	2018–19	Russian Premier League	8	0	0	0	–		–		8	0
Yenisey Krasnoyarsk	2019–20	Russian Premier League	16	1	1	0	–		–		17	1
Yenisey Krasnoyarsk	Total		24	1	1	0	-	-	-	-	25	1
Shakhter Karagandy	2020	Kazakhstan Premier League	19	5	0	0	–		–		19	5
Shakhter Karagandy	2009	Kazakhstan Premier League	5	0	0	0	–		2	0	7	0
Shakhter Karagandy	Total		24	5	0	0	0	2	0	0	26	5
Career total			264	34	13	1	9	0	3	0	289	34

== Honours ==
=== FC Alania Vladikavkaz ===
- Russian Cup (1): Runner-up 2010-11

=== FC Kuban Krasnodar ===
- Russian Cup (1): Runner-up 2014-15
