= Fegor Ogude =

Nigerian footballer (born 1987)

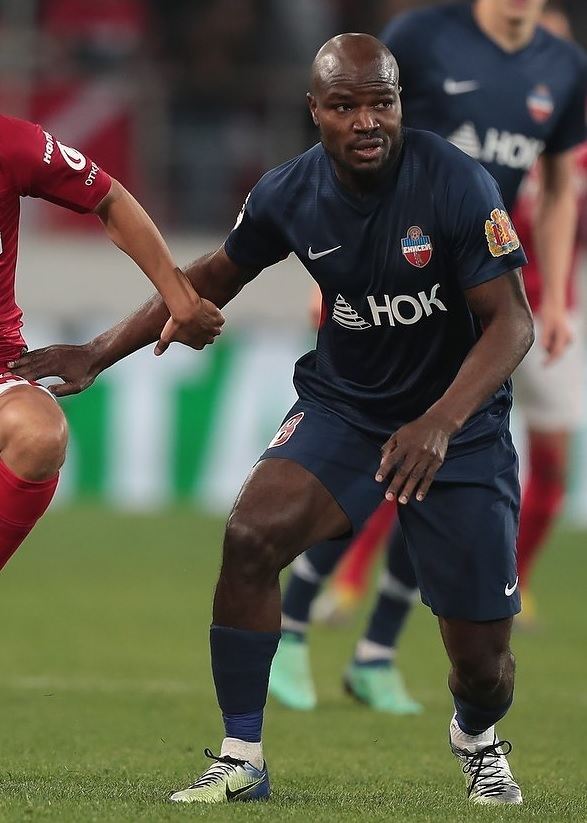
- Ogude with Yenisey Krasnoyarsk in 2019

Personal information
- Date of birth: 29 July 1987 (age 39)
- Place of birth: Lagos, Nigeria
- Height: 1.80 m (5 ft 11 in)
- Position: Midfielder

Senior career*
Years	Team	Apps	(Gls)
2007–2010	Warri Wolves	62	(17)
2010–2013	Vålerenga	51	(6)
2014–2018	Amkar Perm	88	(4)
2018–2019	Yenisey Krasnoyarsk	26	(1)
2020	Warri Wolves		

International career
2011–2013	Nigeria	16	(0)
Medal record
Men's football
Representing Nigeria
Africa Cup of Nations
Winner	2013 South Africa
- * Club domestic league appearances and goals

Fegor Ogude MON (born 29 July 1987) is a Nigerian former professional footballer who played as a central midfielder or centre-back.

== Club career ==
Ogude started his senior career in the Nigerian team Warri Wolves, where he was captain.

On 31 August 2010, he signed for Norwegian team Vålerenga. He had been followed closely by the club after being on trial at the club, in the summer of 2009. He also had offers from two other Norwegian clubs, but he chose Vålerenga Oslo.

On 14 January 2014, he signed a contract until June 2016 for Russian team Amkar Perm. In June 2016, Ogude signed a new two-year contract with Amkar Perm.

On 5 July 2018, Ogude signed for Yenisey Krasnoyarsk. Following Yenisey's relegation from the Russian Premier League at the end of the 2018–19 season, Ogude was released by the club.

== International career ==
Ogude was selected for the Nigerian national team in an Africa Cup of Nations qualifying match against Madagascar.

He was called up to Nigeria's 23-man squad for the 2013 Africa Cup of Nations. Ogude won the Africa Cup of Nations with Nigeria in 2013.

He was selected for Nigeria's squad at the 2013 FIFA Confederations Cup.

== Career statistics ==
=== Club ===
As of match played 26 May 2019

Appearances and goals by club, season and competition
Club	Season	League			National cup		Continental		Other		Total	
Club	Season	Division	Apps	Goals	Apps	Goals	Apps	Goals	Apps	Goals	Apps	Goals
Vålerenga	2010	Tippeligaen	6	0	0	0	–		–		6	0
Vålerenga	2011	Tippeligaen	25	6	1	3	4	0	–		30	9
Vålerenga	2012	Tippeligaen	8	0	0	0	–		–		8	0
Vålerenga	2013	Tippeligaen	12	0	0	0	–		–		12	0
Vålerenga	Total		51	6	1	3	4	0	0	0	56	9
Amkar Perm	2013–14	Russian Premier League	9	3	0	0	–		–		9	3
Amkar Perm	2014–15	Russian Premier League	24	1	1	0	–		–		25	1
Amkar Perm	2015–16	Russian Premier League	22	0	4	0	–		–		26	0
Amkar Perm	2016–17	Russian Premier League	18	0	0	0	–		–		18	0
Amkar Perm	2017–18	Russian Premier League	15	0	2	0	–		2 (Note: Two appearances in relegation play-offs)	0	19	0
Amkar Perm	Total		88	4	7	0	0	0	2	0	97	4
Yenisey Krasnoyarsk	2018–19	Russian Premier League	26	1	2	0	–		–		28	1
Career total			164	11	10	3	4	0	2	0	181	14

=== International ===
Appearances and goals by national team and year
National team	Year	Apps	Goals
Nigeria	2011	8	0
Nigeria	2012	0	0
Nigeria	2013	8	0
Total		16	0

== Honours ==
Nigeria

- Africa Cup of Nations (1): 2013

Orders

- Member of the Order of the Niger
