= Anatoli Rozhkov =

Russian football player and coach

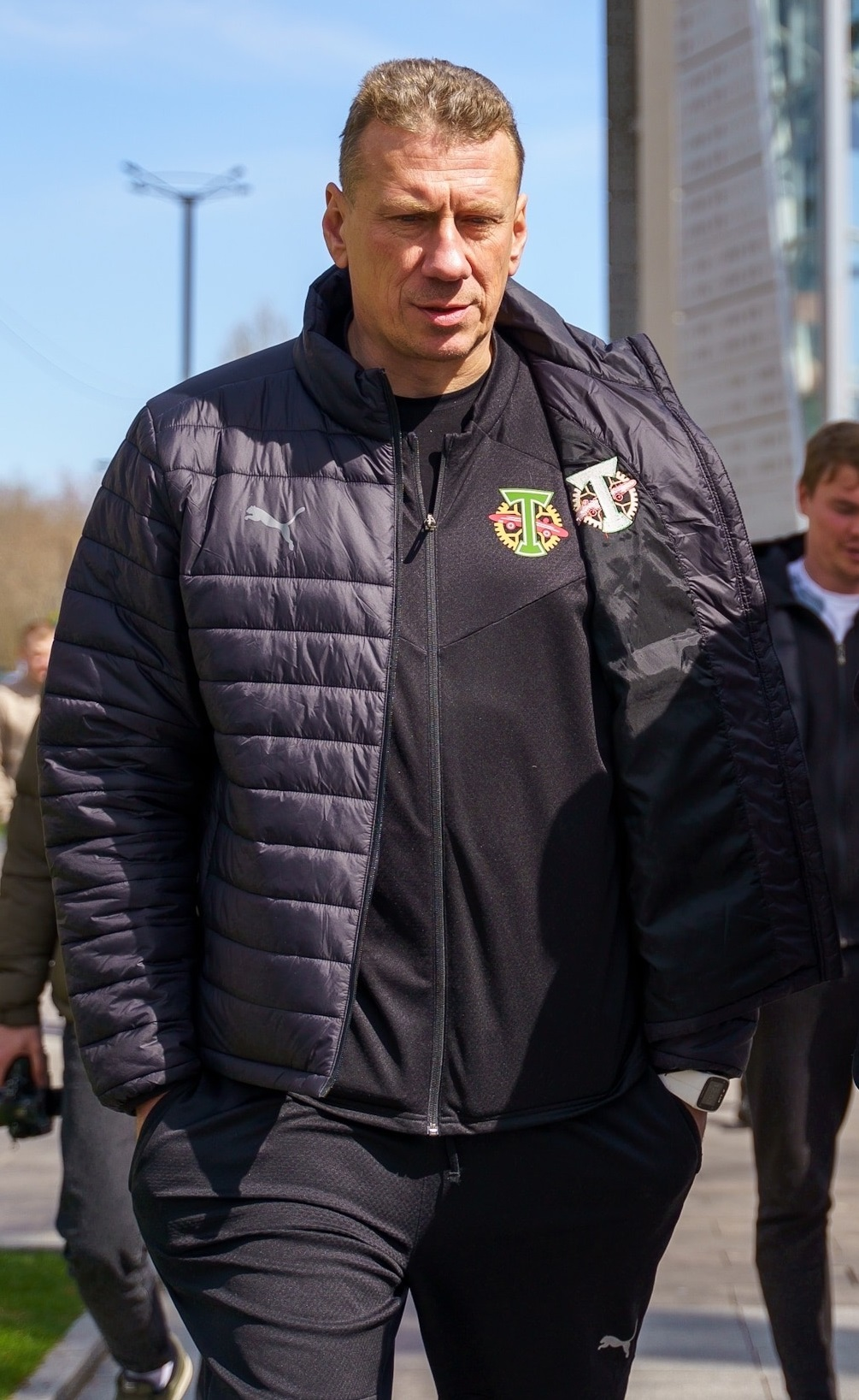
- Rozhkov with Torpedo Moscow in 2023

Personal information
- Full name: Anatoli Viktorovich Rozhkov
- Date of birth: 29 August 1972 (age 54)
- Place of birth: Moscow, Russian SFSR, Soviet Union
- Height: 1.95 m (6 ft 5 in)
- Position: Goalkeeper

Team information
- Current team: FC Arsenal Tula (GK coach)

Youth career
- SDYuShOR-3 SRONO Moscow

Senior career*
Years	Team	Apps	(Gls)
1989–1991	Torpedo Moscow	0	(0)
1992	Kinotavr Podolsk	7	(0)
1993–1996	FC Spartak Shchyolkovo	97	(0)
1997	FC MChS-Selyatino Selyatino	18	(0)
1998–1999	FC Torpedo-Viktoria Nizhny Novgorod	37	(0)
2000–2007	FC Khimki	110	(0)
2008	FC MVD Rossii Moscow	17	(0)
2011–2012	FC Khimki	0	(0)

Managerial career
- 2009: FC Saturn Moscow Oblast (GK coach)
- 2010: FC Saturn Moscow Oblast (U21 GK coach)
- 2011: FC Khimki (GK coach)
- 2012–2013: FC Sparta Shchyolkovo (GK coach)
- 2014–2016: FC Solyaris Moscow (GK coach)
- 2016–2017: FC Yenisey Krasnoyarsk (GK coach)
- 2017–2018: PFC Krylia Sovetov Samara (GK coach)
- 2019–2020: FC Yenisey Krasnoyarsk (GK coach)
- 2020–2021: FC Khimik-Arsenal (GK coach)
- 2021–2022: FC Ararat-Armenia (GK coach)
- 2022–2024: FC Torpedo Moscow (GK coach)
- 2024–2026: FC Yenisey Krasnoyarsk (GK coach)
- 2026–: FC Arsenal Tula (GK coach)
- * Club domestic league appearances and goals

Anatoli Viktorovich Rozhkov (Russian: Анатолий Викторович Рожков; born 29 August 1972) is a Russian professional football coach and former goalkeeper. He is the goalkeeping coach of FC Arsenal Tula.

== Career ==
On 18 August 2022 he joined the coaching staff of Nikolai Kovardayev in Torpedo Moscow.
