= Geolog Stadium =

Sports venue in Tyumen, Russia

Coordinates: 57.1617°N 65.5139°E

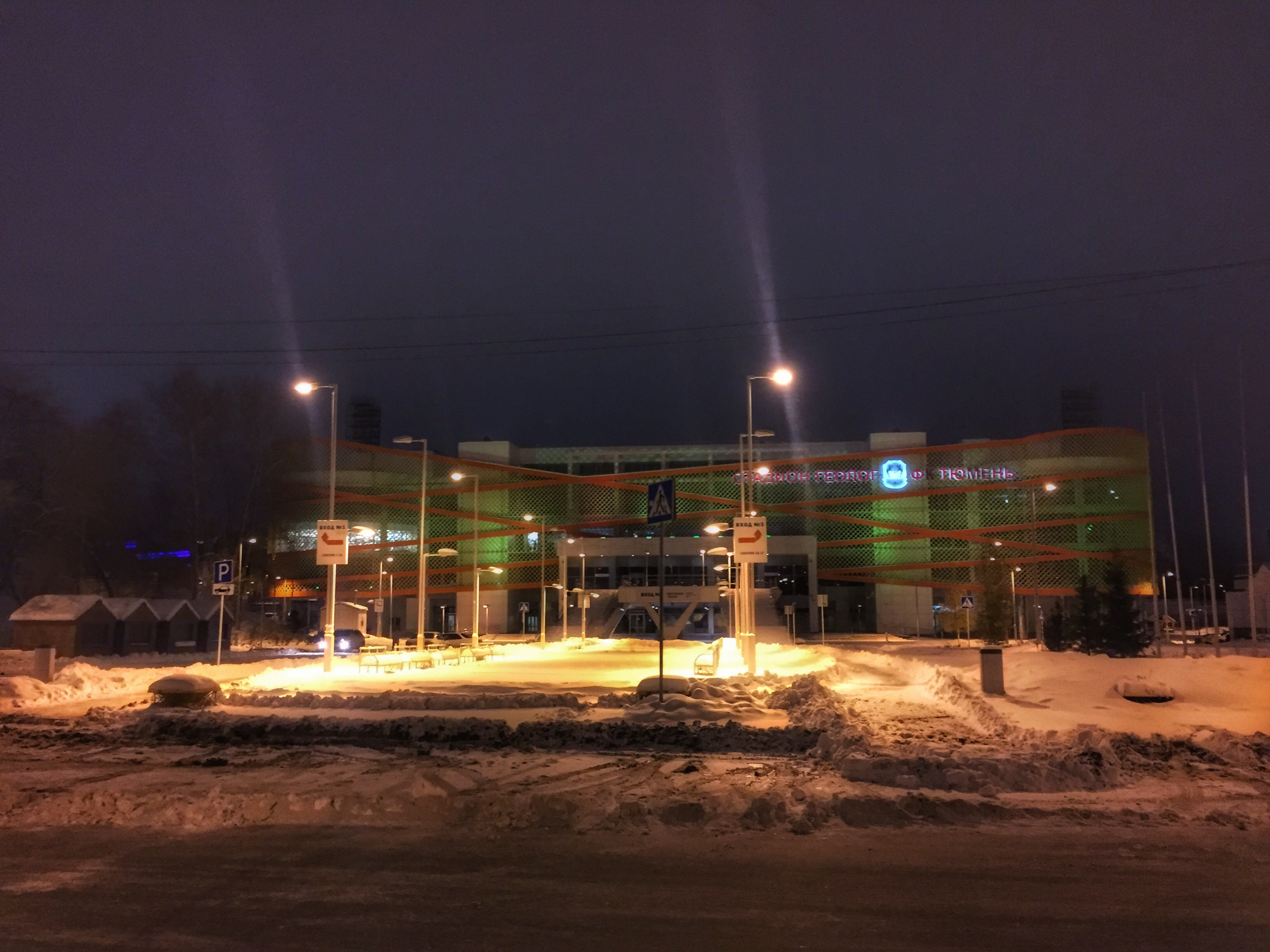
- Interactive map of Geolog Stadium
- Location: Tyumen, Russia
- Capacity: 13,057
- Surface: Artificial turf

Construction
- Built: 1982
- Opened: 1983
- Renovated: 2011

Tenants
- FC Tyumen, FC Ural (2014-2015)

Geolog Stadium is a multi-purpose stadium in Tyumen, Russia. It is currently used mostly for football matches and is the home stadium of FC Tyumen. The stadium holds 13,057 people, all seated. Since 2008, many health units including a sports hall and gymnasium, swimming pool, saunas, and a restaurant, have been added to the complex.
