= Mikhail Filippov =

Russian professional football player

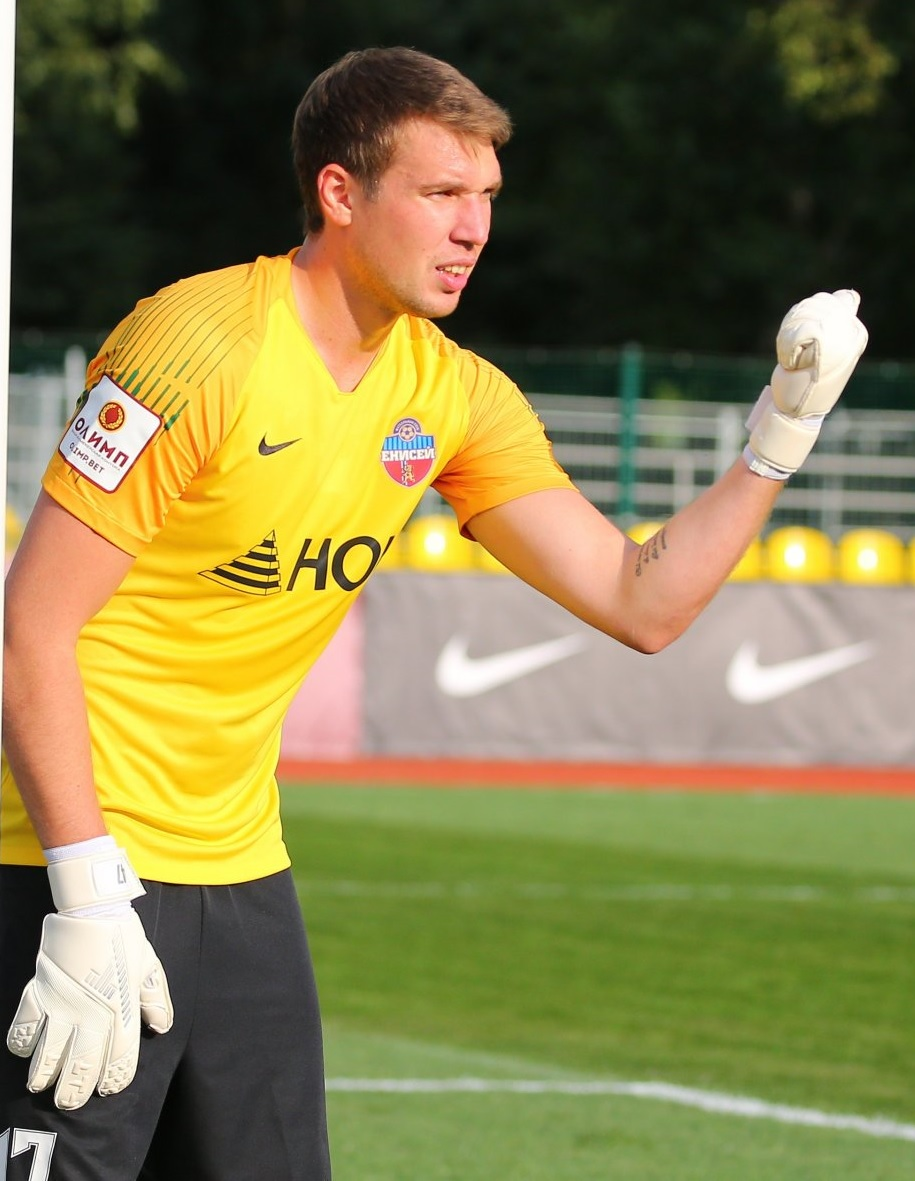
- Filippov with Yenisey Krasnoyarsk in 2019

Personal information
- Full name: Mikhail Mikhailovich Filippov
- Date of birth: 10 June 1992 (age 34)
- Place of birth: Volzhsky, Volgograd Oblast, Russia
- Height: 1.97 m (6 ft 6 in)
- Position: Goalkeeper

Team information
- Current team: FC Egrisi Moscow (amateur)

Youth career
- SDYuSShOR-4 Volzhsky
- –2006: FC Rotor Volgograd
- 2006–2008: Master-Saturn Yegoryevsk
- 2009–2010: FC Saturn Ramenskoye

Senior career*
Years	Team	Apps	(Gls)
2010–2011	FC Saturn Ramenskoye	18	(0)
2010	→ FC Saturn-2 Moscow Oblast	7	(0)
2011–2012	FC Tom Tomsk	0	(0)
2012–2013	FC Amur-2010 Blagoveshchensk	7	(0)
2013	FC Znamya Truda Orekhovo-Zuyevo	16	(0)
2014–2017	FC Spartak Moscow	0	(0)
2014–2017	→ FC Spartak-2 Moscow	57	(0)
2017–2019	FC Yenisey Krasnoyarsk	49	(0)
2019	→ FC Rotor Volgograd (loan)	4	(0)
2020	FC Torpedo Moscow	0	(0)
2020–2021	FC Chayka Peschanokopskoye	36	(0)
2021–2023	FC Shinnik Yaroslavl	44	(0)
2023	FC Chernomorets Novorossiysk	0	(0)
2024	FC SKA Rostov-on-Don (amateur)		
2024	FC Goats Moscow (amateur)		
2024	FC ZOV Moscow (amateur)		
2024	FC Goats Moscow (amateur)		
2024	FC 10 Moscow (amateur)		
2025–	FC Egrisi Moscow (amateur)		
- * Club domestic league appearances and goals

Mikhail Mikhailovich Filippov (Russian: Михаил Михайлович Филиппов; born 10 June 1992) is a Russian professional football player who plays as a goalkeeper for FC Egrisi Moscow.

== Club career ==
He made his Russian Premier League debut for FC Yenisey Krasnoyarsk on 7 October 2018 in a game against FC Spartak Moscow.

On 19 February 2019, he joined FC Rotor Volgograd on loan until the end of the 2018–19 season.
