= Oleh Danchenko =

Ukrainian footballer

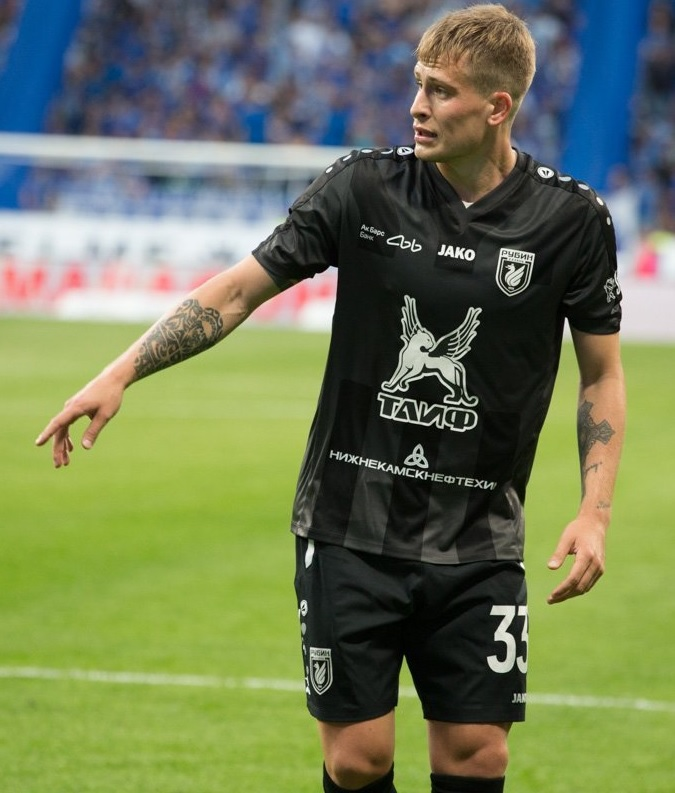
- Danchenko with Rubin Kazan in 2019

Personal information
- Full name: Oleh Serhiyovych Danchenko
- Date of birth: 1 August 1994 (age 32)
- Place of birth: Zaporizhzhia, Ukraine
- Height: 1.78 m (5 ft 10 in)
- Position: Right-back

Youth career
- 2007–2010: Metalurh Zaporizhzhia

Senior career*
Years	Team	Apps	(Gls)
2010–2011	Dynamo Khmelnytskyi	17	(2)
2012–2016	Chornomorets Odesa	44	(0)
2016–2019	Shakhtar Donetsk	9	(0)
2016–2017	→ Chornomorets Odesa (loan)	24	(0)
2017–2018	→ Anzhi Makhachkala (loan)	28	(3)
2019	→ Yenisey Krasnoyarsk (loan)	11	(0)
2019–2021	Rubin Kazan	19	(0)
2020–2021	→ Ufa (loan)	15	(0)
2021–2024	AEK Athens	7	(0)
2022–2024	→ Zorya Luhansk (loan)	23	(0)
Total		197	(5)

International career^{‡}
2014–2016	Ukraine U21	28	(3)
- * Club domestic league appearances and goals as of 15 March 2024 ‡ National team caps and goals as of 16 June 2019

Oleh Danchenko (Ukrainian: Олег Сергійович Данченко; born 1 August 1994) is a Ukrainian former professional footballer who played as a right-back.

== Career ==
Danchenko is a product of the youth team systems of FC Metalurh Zaporizhzhia. He made his debut for FC Chornomorets in a game against SC Tavriya Simferopol on 22 March 2014 in the Ukrainian Premier League.

In February 2016, he signed a contract with Shakhtar Donetsk, but remained to play on loan for the half-year term in FC Chornomorets.

On 31 January 2019, he joined FC Yenisey Krasnoyarsk on loan until the end of the 2018–19 season.

On 15 June 2019, he signed a four-year contract with Rubin Kazan. For 2020–21 season, a new limit of 8 foreign players was introduced in the Russian Premier League, and was not registered by the club with the league. On 15 August 2020, he joined Ufa on loan with an option to purchase.

On 31 January 2021, AEK Athens officially announced the signing of Danchenko on a contract running until the summer of 2024. On 14 January 2022 when he signed his contract with Zorya Luhansk, his wife was killed in a road accident.

== Career statistics ==
=== Club ===
As of 19 June 2024

Club	Season	League			Cup		Continental		Other		Total	
Club	Season	Division	Apps	Goals	Apps	Goals	Apps	Goals	Apps	Goals	Apps	Goals
Dynamo Khmelnytskyi	2010–11	Ukrainian Second League	6	1	0	0	—		—		6	1
Dynamo Khmelnytskyi	2011–12	Ukrainian Second League	11	1	1	0	—		—		12	1
Dynamo Khmelnytskyi	Total		17	2	1	0	—		—		18	2
Chornomorets Odesa	2011–12	Ukrainian Premier League	0	0	0	0	—		—		0	0
Chornomorets Odesa	2012–13	Ukrainian Premier League	0	0	0	0	—		—		0	0
Chornomorets Odesa	2013–14	Ukrainian Premier League	8	0	1	0	—		—		9	0
Chornomorets Odesa	2014–15	Ukrainian Premier League	15	0	2	0	1 (Note: One appearance in 2014–15 UEFA Europa League)	0	—		18	0
Chornomorets Odesa	2015–16	Ukrainian Premier League	21	0	2	0	—		—		23	0
Chornomorets Odesa	2016–17	Ukrainian Premier League	24	0	0	0	—		—		24	0
Chornomorets Odesa	Total		68	0	5	0	1	0	—		74	0
Anzhi Makhachkala (loan)	2017–18	Russian Premier League	28	3	0	0	—		1 (Note: One appearance in relegation play-offs)	0	29	3
Anzhi Makhachkala (loan)	Total		28	3	0	0	—		1	0	29	0
Shakhtar Donetsk	2018–19	Ukrainian Premier League	9	0	1	1	1 (Note: One appearance in 2018–19 UEFA Champions League)	0	1 (Note: One appearance in 2018 Ukrainian Super Cup)	0	12	1
Shakhtar Donetsk	Total		9	0	1	1	1	0	1	0	12	1
Yenisey Krasnoyarsk (loan)	2018–19	Russian Premier League	11	0	0	0	—		—		11	0
Yenisey Krasnoyarsk (loan)	Total		11	0	0	0	—		—		11	0
Rubin Kazan	2019–20	Russian Premier League	19	0	1	0	—		—		20	0
Rubin Kazan	Total		19	0	1	0	—		—		20	0
Ufa (loan)	2020–21	Russian Premier League	15	0	1	0	—		—		16	0
Ufa (loan)	Total		15	0	1	0	—		—		16	0
AEK Athens	2020–21	Superleague Greece	7	0	3	0	—		—		10	0
AEK Athens	2021–22	Superleague Greece	0	0	0	0	0	0	—		0	0
AEK Athens	Total		7	0	3	0	0	0	—		10	0
Zorya Luhansk (loan)	2021–22	Ukrainian Premier League	0	0	0	0	—		—		0	0
Zorya Luhansk (loan)	2022–23	Ukrainian Premier League	15	0	0	0	2 (Note: Two appearances in 2022–23 UEFA Europa Conference League qualifying phase and play-off round)	0	—		17	0
Zorya Luhansk (loan)	2023–24	Ukrainian Premier League	8	0	2	0	4 (Note: Four appearances in 2023–24 UEFA Europa Conference League group stage)	0	—		14	0
Zorya Luhansk (loan)	Total		23	0	2	0	6	0	—		31	0
Career total			197	5	14	1	8	0	2	0	221	6
