= Aleksandr Kutyin =

Russian footballer

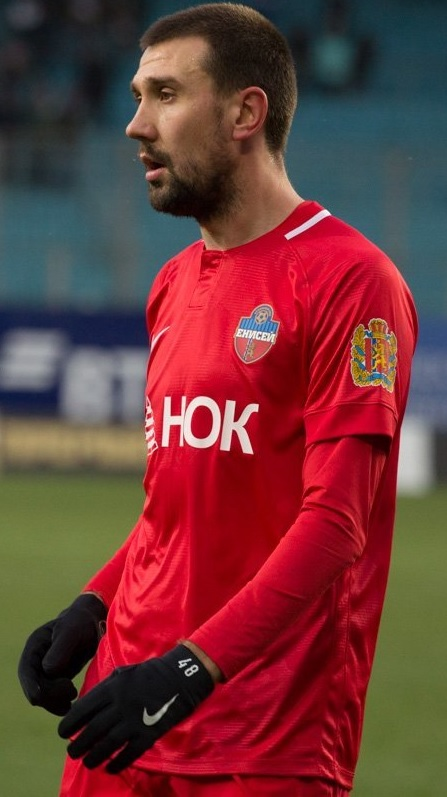
- Kutyin with Yenisey in 2018

Personal information
- Full name: Aleksandr Stanislavovich Kutyin
- Date of birth: 13 February 1986 (age 40)
- Place of birth: Yelets, Lipetsk Oblast, Russian SFSR
- Height: 1.88 m (6 ft 2 in)
- Position: Striker

Senior career*
Years	Team	Apps	(Gls)
2003–2007	FC Yelets	116	(33)
2008–2009	FC Metallurg Lipetsk	65	(10)
2010	FC Tyumen	10	(1)
2010–2012	FC Metallurg Lipetsk	47	(26)
2012–2015	FC Arsenal Tula	100	(46)
2016–2017	FC Tosno	51	(10)
2017–2019	FC Yenisey Krasnoyarsk	52	(12)
2019–2020	FC Luch Vladivostok	25	(2)
2020–2022	FC Metallurg Lipetsk	62	(18)
2022–2023	FC Yelets (amateur)		
- * Club domestic league appearances and goals

Aleksandr Stanislavovich Kutyin (Russian: Александр Станиславович Кутьин; born 13 February 1986) is a Russian former professional football player who played as a striker.

== Club career ==
He made his Russian Premier League debut for FC Arsenal Tula on 10 August 2014 in a game against FC Lokomotiv Moscow, after helping Arsenal achieve two consecutive promotions with 16 and 19 goals seasons respectively.

== Honours ==
- Russian National Football League top scorer: 2013–14.
- Russian Professional Football League Zone Center top scorer: 2012–13.
