= David Mildzikhov =

Russian footballer

Personal information
- Full name: David Vyacheslavovich Mildzikhov
- Date of birth: 8 June 1994 (age 32)
- Place of birth: Vladikavkaz, Russia
- Height: 1.78 m (5 ft 10 in)
- Positions: Defender; midfielder

Senior career*
Years	Team	Apps	(Gls)
2012	FC Akademiya Tolyatti	14	(0)
2013	FC Volgar-Astrakhan Astrakhan	4	(1)
2013–2014	FC Volgar Astrakhan	20	(1)
2014–2015	FC Metallurg Novokuznetsk	23	(4)
2015	FC Baikal Irkutsk	18	(0)
2016–2017	FC Zenit-2 Saint Petersburg	29	(3)
2017–2020	FC Yenisey Krasnoyarsk	25	(1)
2018–2019	→ FC Khimki (loan)	13	(0)
2020–2021	FC Tom Tomsk	13	(0)

International career
2016	Russia U21	3	(0)
- * Club domestic league appearances and goals

David Vyacheslavovich Mildzikhov (Russian: Давид Вячеславович Мильдзихов; born 8 June 1994) is a Russian former football player. He played as a right back.

== Club career ==
He made his debut in the Russian Second Division for FC Akademiya Tolyatti on 24 July 2012 in a game against FC Gornyak Uchaly.

He made his Russian Football National League debut for FC Baikal Irkutsk on 11 July 2015 in a game against FC Arsenal Tula.
