= Central Stadium (Krasnoyarsk) =

Multi-use stadium in Krasnoyarsk, Russia

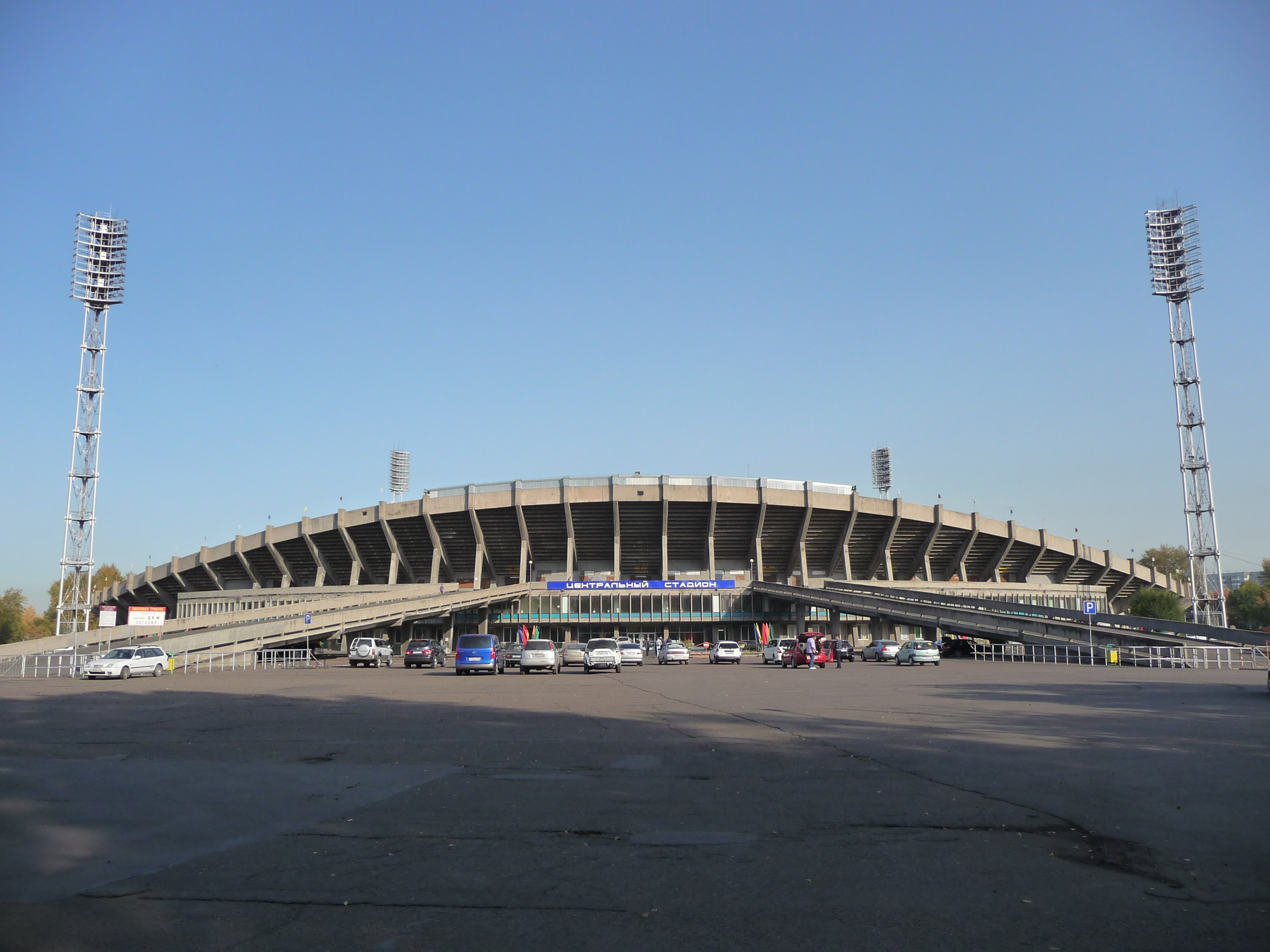
- Interactive map of Central Stadium
- Location: Krasnoyarsk, Russia
- Coordinates: 55°59′54.25″N 92°53′04.79″E
- Owner: Krasnoyarsk Krai
- Capacity: 15,000 seated
- Surface: Grass

Construction
- Opened: 29 October 1967

Tenant
- Yenisey Krasnoyarsk (1967–present)

The Central Stadium is a multi-use stadium in Island of Rest, Krasnoyarsk, Russia. It is currently used mostly for football matches and is the home ground of FC Yenisey Krasnoyarsk. It also hosts some matches of the Russian national rugby union team, Krasny Yar and Enisei-STM. The stadium was designed by the architect V. Orekhov in 2.5 years and was opened on 29 October 1967. The stadium borrows the area of 5.5 hectares and includes:

- football field with heating, the area 7,700 square meters;
- 8 racetracks 400х10 meters;
- 4 sectors for broad jumps;
- 2 sectors for high jumps;
- sector for pole vaults;
- sectors for javelin throw, a disk and standing jumps

The stadium holds 15,000 people.

== VHL Russian Classic ==
An outdoor ice hockey game named the Russian Classic was held on 17 February 2012 at the Central Stadium. It featured Sokol Krasnoyarsk against Lokomotiv Yaroslavl, both of the Supreme Hockey League (VHL).
