= Pavel Rozhkov =

Russian footballer

Personal information
- Full name: Pavel Andreyevich Rozhkov
- Date of birth: 31 December 1986 (age 39)
- Place of birth: Krasnoyarsk, Russian SFSR
- Height: 1.78 m (5 ft 10 in)
- Position: Midfielder

Youth career
- DYuSSh-2 Krasnoyarsk

Senior career*
Years	Team	Apps	(Gls)
2004–2010	FC Metallurg-Yenisey Krasnoyarsk	137	(5)
2011–2012	FC Irtysh Omsk	32	(7)
2012–2013	FC Yenisey Krasnoyarsk	29	(0)
2013	→ FC Luch-Energiya Vladivostok (loan)	9	(0)
2014	FC Sakhalin Yuzhno-Sakhalinsk	7	(1)
2014	FC Zenit Penza	3	(0)
2014–2015	FC Vityaz Podolsk	11	(1)
2015	FC Restavratsiya Krasnoyarsk		
2016–2021	FC Yenisey Krasnoyarsk	54	(1)
- * Club domestic league appearances and goals

Pavel Andreyevich Rozhkov (Russian: Павел Андреевич Рожков; born 31 December 1986) is a Russian former professional football player. He played as a defensive midfielder or centre back.

== Club career ==
He made his Russian Premier League debut for FC Yenisey Krasnoyarsk on 29 July 2018 in a game against FC Zenit Saint Petersburg.
