= List of Russian football transfers summer 2018 =

This is a list of Russian football transfers in the 2018 summer transfer window by club. Only clubs of the 2018–19 Russian Premier League are included.

== Russian Premier League 2018–19 ==
=== Akhmat Grozny ===
In: Note: Flags indicate national team as defined under FIFA eligibility rules; some limited exceptions apply. Players may hold more than one non-FIFA nationality.

No.	Pos.	Nation	Player
5	DF	RUS	Magomed Musalov (on loan from Anzhi Makhachkala)
6	MF	RUS	Mikhail Gashchenkov (from Amkar Perm)
8	MF	CIV	Idrissa Doumbia (from (Belgium) Anderlecht)
20	DF	CRO	Zoran Nižić (from (Croatia) Hajduk Split)
31	GK	RUS	Aleksandr Sheplyakov (from CRFSO Smolensk, previously on loan)
52	GK	RUS	Akhmed Bunkhoyev
59	MF	RUS	Yevgeni Kharin (from (Estonia) Levadia Tallinn)

Out: Note: Flags indicate national team as defined under FIFA eligibility rules; some limited exceptions apply. Players may hold more than one non-FIFA nationality.

No.	Pos.	Nation	Player
8	MF	BRA	Léo Jabá (to (Greece) PAOK)
21	MF	ALB	Odise Roshi (injury)
22	MF	RUS	Adlan Katsayev (to Anzhi Makhachkala)
24	MF	RUS	Roland Gigolayev (on loan to Anzhi Makhachkala)
39	MF	RUS	Said-Akhmed Tsatiyev
52	MF	RUS	Abdurakhman Akhilgov (to Angusht Nazran)
64	FW	RUS	Radzhab Isayev
66	DF	RUS	Mursalin Denilkhanov
69	MF	RUS	Ilya Moseychuk
75	FW	RUS	Khamzat Gabunukayev
84	MF	RUS	Magomed-Emi Khakiyev
88	MF	RUS	Askhab Chunchurov
90	FW	RUS	Islam Alsultanov
93	FW	RUS	Apti Akhyadov (on loan to Anzhi Makhachkala)
94	DF	BRA	Philipe Sampaio (to (Portugal) Feirense)
97	GK	RUS	Ramzan Mutuskhanov
98	MF	RUS	Chingiz Magomadov
—	DF	RUS	Idris Musluyev (released, previously on loan to Angusht Nazran)
—	MF	URU	Facundo Píriz (to (France) Montpellier, previously on loan)
—	MF	ROU	Gabriel Torje (to (Turkey) Sivasspor, previously on loan to (Romania) Dinamo București)

=== Anzhi Makhachkala ===
In: Note: Flags indicate national team as defined under FIFA eligibility rules; some limited exceptions apply. Players may hold more than one non-FIFA nationality.

No.	Pos.	Nation	Player
3	DF	RUS	Igor Udaly (end of loan to Orenburg)
5	MF	RUS	Vladislav Kulik (from Krylia Sovetov Samara)
9	FW	VEN	Andrés Ponce (from (Italy) Sampdoria)
10	MF	RUS	Adlan Katsayev (from Akhmat Grozny)
13	MF	RUS	Roland Gigolayev (on loan from Akhmat Grozny)
18	FW	RUS	Apti Akhyadov (on loan from Akhmat Grozny)
19	MF	RUS	Pavel Dolgov (end of loan to (Belarus) Torpedo-BelAZ Zhodino)
20	MF	GHA	Mohammed Rabiu (recovery from injury)
21	DF	RUS	Dmitry Belorukov (from Dynamo Moscow)
22	GK	RUS	Yury Dyupin (from Kuban Krasnodar)
24	MF	RUS	Konstantin Savichev (from SKA-Khabarovsk)
25	DF	RUS	Ivan Novoseltsev (on loan from Zenit Saint Petersburg)
27	FW	RUS	Amir Mokhammad (from Legion Dynamo Makhachkala)
29	MF	CMR	Gaël Ondoua (free agent)
30	DF	RUS	Yevgeni Gapon (from Kuban Krasnodar)
45	DF	RUS	Yusup Vagabov
49	DF	RUS	Sergei Mikhailov

Out: Note: Flags indicate national team as defined under FIFA eligibility rules; some limited exceptions apply. Players may hold more than one non-FIFA nationality.

No.	Pos.	Nation	Player
3	DF	RUS	Vladimir Poluyakhtov (to Krylia Sovetov Samara)
5	DF	RUS	Magomed Musalov (on loan to Akhmat Grozny)
8	DF	RUS	Arsen Khubulov (to (Turkey) Erzurumspor)
8	MF	ROU	Paul Anton (to Krylia Sovetov Samara)
9	FW	UKR	Pylyp Budkivskyi (end of loan from (Ukraine) Shakhtar Donetsk)
10	MF	GHA	Kwadwo Poku (to (United States) Tampa Bay Rowdies)
14	DF	MDA	Igor Armaș (to (Romania) Voluntari)
22	MF	RUS	Shakhban Gaydarov (to Legion Dynamo Makhachkala)
24	DF	RUS	Dzhambolat Bolatov
25	FW	RUS	Salam Dzhanbekov
28	DF	RUS	Rustam Isayev
29	MF	RUS	Ismail Ibragimov
35	MF	RUS	Marat Abulashev
36	FW	RUS	Raul Shikhayev (to Legion Dynamo Makhachkala)
40	MF	RUS	Shikhamir Isayev
44	DF	RUS	Bagautdin Rikmatullayev
47	GK	GEO	Giorgi Loria (end of loan from Krylia Sovetov Samara)
49	FW	RUS	Aleksandr Prudnikov (to (Latvia) Spartaks Jūrmala)
49	DF	RUS	Roman Kvataniya (to Lokomotiv Moscow)
51	MF	RUS	Aleksey Shishkin (to Legion Dynamo Makhachkala)
52	DF	SLO	Miral Samardžić (to Krylia Sovetov Samara)
53	DF	RUS	Shamil Abdurazakov
54	FW	RUS	Bagand Bagandov
59	MF	RUS	Mariz Saidov
59	MF	RUS	Muslim Shikhbabayev (to Legion Dynamo Makhachkala)
63	DF	RUS	Yarakhmed Makhmudov
64	GK	RUS	Khadzhimurad Gadzhiyev (to Legion Dynamo Makhachkala)
65	DF	RUS	Viktor Khugayev (to Chertanovo-2 Moscow)
66	MF	RUS	Amirkhan Temukov
67	DF	RUS	Stanislav Karakoz (end of loan from Chertanovo Moscow)
70	MF	RUS	Chingiz Agabalayev (to Legion Dynamo Makhachkala)
73	MF	RUS	Zalimkhan Yusupov (to Legion Dynamo Makhachkala)
74	FW	RUS	Ivan Ivanchenko (on loan to Zvezda Perm)
76	MF	RUS	Shamil Murtuzaliyev
77	DF	RUS	Islam Zhilov (to Urozhay Krasnodar)
78	MF	RUS	Mikhail Bakayev (to Orenburg)
80	MF	RUS	Tamerlan Ramazanov
83	FW	RUS	Semyon Belyakov (to SKA-Khabarovsk)
84	GK	RUS	Dmitry Gerasimov (to Khimik Novomoskovsk)
89	MF	RUS	Rustam Khalimbekov (to Angusht Nazran)
90	FW	RUS	Amur Kalmykov (on loan to Urozhay Krasnodar)
91	MF	RUS	Pavel Yakovlev (to Krylia Sovetov Samara)
92	DF	RUS	Sergei Bryzgalov (to Ural Yekaterinburg)
93	MF	RUS	Ramazan Abduragimov
94	MF	UKR	Oleh Danchenko (end of loan from (Ukraine) Shakhtar Donetsk)
95	DF	RUS	Magomed Elmurzayev
99	FW	ARG	Juan Lescano (on loan to (Kazakhstan) Tobol)
—	DF	RUS	Anton Belov (to Zorky Krasnogorsk, previously on loan)
—	MF	RUS	Anvar Gazimagomedov (to Legion Dynamo Makhachkala, previously on loan)
—	FW	RUS	Aleksandr Bataev (released, previously on loan to Chernomorets Novorossiysk)
—	FW	RUS	Rashid Magomedov (to Legion Dynamo Makhachkala, previously on loan)

=== Arsenal Tula ===
In: Note: Flags indicate national team as defined under FIFA eligibility rules; some limited exceptions apply. Players may hold more than one non-FIFA nationality.

No.	Pos.	Nation	Player
1	GK	RUS	Artur Nigmatullin (from Amkar Perm)
5	DF	GHA	Abdul Kadiri Mohammed (on loan from Austria Wien)
19	MF	RUS	Reziuan Mirzov (on loan from Rostov)
22	FW	RUS	Daniil Lesovoy (on loan from Zenit Saint Petersburg)
31	FW	RUS	Yegor Prilepsky (from Energomash Belgorod)
33	DF	RUS	Artyom Sokol (from Spartak Moscow)
45	FW	SRB	Ognjen Ožegović (on loan from (Serbia) Partizan)
50	GK	RUS	Yegor Shamov (from Luch Vladivostok)
57	MF	RUS	Kirill Orekhov (from Spartak Moscow)
69	FW	RUS	Nikita Yeryomenko
70	MF	BUL	Georgi Kostadinov (from (Israel) Maccabi Haifa)
78	MF	RUS	Zelimkhan Bakayev (on loan from Spartak Moscow)
87	MF	RUS	Yuri Petrovskiy
89	FW	RUS	Luchano Bobrov (from Dynamo Moscow academy)
90	DF	RUS	Aleksandr Krikunenko (from Khimik Novomoskovsk)
93	MF	RUS	Denis Patsev (from Spartak Moscow)
99	DF	RUS	Ilya Ivanov (from Spartak Moscow)

Out: Note: Flags indicate national team as defined under FIFA eligibility rules; some limited exceptions apply. Players may hold more than one non-FIFA nationality.

No.	Pos.	Nation	Player
1	GK	RUS	Igor Obukhov (end of loan from Zenit Saint Petersburg)
13	DF	ZAM	Stoppila Sunzu (end of loan from (France) Lille)
15	MF	CIV	Habib Maïga (end of loan from (France) Saint-Étienne)
16	GK	RUS	Aleksei Berezin (to (Belarus) Dnepr Mogilev)
19	FW	ARG	Federico Rasic (to (Cyprus) Pafos)
20	MF	SRB	Goran Čaušić (to (Serbia) Red Star Belgrade)
22	MF	RUS	Danila Buranov (to Strogino Moscow)
24	FW	RUS	Artem Dzyuba (end of loan from Zenit Saint Petersburg)
25	DF	RUS	Artyom Yarmolitsky (to Khimik Novomoskovsk)
33	FW	RUS	Aslanbek Sikoyev
35	GK	RUS	Nikita Makeyev (to Tekstilshchik Ivanovo)
41	MF	RUS	Dmitry Doronin (to Saturn Ramenskoye)
45	FW	RUS	Arkady Lobzin (to Torpedo Vladimir)
47	DF	RUS	Svyatoslav Artyushkin
52	DF	RUS	Ivan Novoseltsev (end of loan from Zenit Saint Petersburg)
55	MF	ROU	Alexandru Bourceanu (to (Romania) Dunărea Călărași)
65	DF	RUS	Boris Samoylov (to Khimki-M)
74	MF	RUS	Eduard Sholokh
87	MF	RUS	Ilya Maksimov
88	MF	RUS	Igor Shevchenko (to Syzran-2003)
91	FW	RUS	Konstantin Antipov (to Sibir-2 Novosibirsk)
95	DF	RUS	Andrei Shustov
98	MF	RUS	Denis Sedykh
—	DF	RUS	Aleksandr Stolyarenko (to Tyumen, previously on loan to Rotor Volgograd)
—	MF	RUS	Maksim Mashnev (to Luch-Energiya Vladivostok, previously on loan)
—	MF	RUS	Vladislav Ryzhkov (to Sibir Novosibirsk, previously on loan to Tambov)
—	MF	RUS	Vadim Steklov (to Avangard Kursk, previously on loan to Yenisey Krasnoyarsk)
—	FW	RUS	Roman Izotov (to Khimik Novomoskovsk, previously on loan to Torpedo Moscow)

=== CSKA Moscow ===
In: Note: Flags indicate national team as defined under FIFA eligibility rules; some limited exceptions apply. Players may hold more than one non-FIFA nationality.

No.	Pos.	Nation	Player
3	DF	RUS	Nikita Chernov (end of loan to Ural Yekaterinburg)
8	MF	CRO	Nikola Vlašić (on loan from (England) Everton)
11	FW	URU	Abel Hernández (from (England) Hull City)
15	MF	RUS	Dmitri Yefremov (end of loan to Orenburg)
17	MF	ISL	Arnór Sigurðsson (from (Sweden) Norrköping)
19	FW	JPN	Takuma Nishimura (from (Japan) Vegalta Sendai)
23	DF	ISL	Hörður Björgvin Magnússon (from (England) Bristol City)
29	MF	SLO	Jaka Bijol (from (Slovenia) Rudar Velenje)
31	MF	RUS	Aleksandr Makarov (end of loan to Tosno)
50	DF	BRA	Rodrigo Becão (on loan from (Brazil) Bahia)
52	DF	RUS	Daniil Fyodorov
53	DF	RUS	Maksim Yeleyev
54	DF	RUS	Danil Savinykh
56	FW	RUS	Yegor Shapovalov
58	MF	RUS	Kirill Shekhov
59	MF	RUS	Tigran Avanesyan
61	DF	RUS	Vadim Konyukhov
62	DF	RUS	Vadim Karpov
63	MF	RUS	Andrei Savinov
64	DF	RUS	Yevgeni Ignatovich
77	MF	RUS	Ilzat Akhmetov (from Rubin Kazan)
98	MF	RUS	Ivan Oblyakov (from Ufa)

Out: Note: Flags indicate national team as defined under FIFA eligibility rules; some limited exceptions apply. Players may hold more than one non-FIFA nationality.

No.	Pos.	Nation	Player
3	MF	SWE	Pontus Wernbloom (to (Greece) PAOK)
4	DF	RUS	Sergei Ignashevich (retired)
6	DF	RUS	Aleksei Berezutski (retired)
7	FW	NGR	Ahmed Musa (end of loan from (England) Leicester City)
8	MF	BUL	Georgi Milanov (to (Hungary) MOL Vidi)
11	FW	BRA	Vitinho (to (Brazil) Flamengo)
17	MF	RUS	Aleksandr Golovin (to (France) Monaco)
24	DF	RUS	Vasili Berezutski (retired)
43	MF	RUS	Nikita Matskharashvili (to Shinnik Yaroslavl)
61	MF	RUS	Kirill Leonov (to Zorky Krasnogorsk)
62	DF	SRB	Aleksandar Stanisavljević (to (Bulgaria) Slavia Sofia)
66	MF	ISR	Bibras Natkho (to (Greece) Olympiacos)
74	DF	RUS	Aleksandr Volkov
99	FW	NGR	Aaron Olanare (released, previously on loan to Amkar Perm)
—	MF	FIN	Roman Eremenko (to Spartak Moscow)
—	FW	RUS	Konstantin Bazelyuk (on loan to SKA-Khabarovsk, previously on loan to (Czech Republic) Zbrojovka Brno)

=== Dynamo Moscow ===
In: Note: Flags indicate national team as defined under FIFA eligibility rules; some limited exceptions apply. Players may hold more than one non-FIFA nationality.

No.	Pos.	Nation	Player
9	MF	POR	Miguel Cardoso (from (Portugal) Tondela)
22	MF	RUS	Joãozinho (from Krasnodar)
33	GK	RUS	Yegor Sedov (from Amkar Perm)
76	MF	RUS	Boburshokh Khasanov
85	DF	RUS	Vladislav Kozlov
89	MF	RUS	Maksim Danilin

Out: Note: Flags indicate national team as defined under FIFA eligibility rules; some limited exceptions apply. Players may hold more than one non-FIFA nationality.

No.	Pos.	Nation	Player
10	MF	RUS	Aleksandr Zotov (on loan to Yenisey Krasnoyarsk)
15	MF	RUS	Ibragim Tsallagov (end of loan from Zenit Saint Petersburg)
26	DF	RUS	Nikita Kalugin (to Sochi)
35	GK	RUS	Pyotr Kosarevsky (to Veles Moscow)
55	FW	RUS	Kirill Burykin (to (Latvia) Ventspils II)
68	MF	RUS	Georgi Chelidze (to (Belgium) Tubize)
70	MF	RUS	Artyom Gorbunov (to Krylia Sovetov Samara)
77	MF	RUS	Anatoli Katrich (to Krasnodar)
88	MF	RUS	Aleksandr Tashayev (to Spartak Moscow)
90	FW	RUS	Nikolay Obolsky (on loan to Sochi)
92	FW	RUS	Maksim Obolsky
—	DF	RUS	Dmitri Belorukov (to Anzhi Makhachkala, previously on loan to Amkar Perm)
—	DF	RUS	Pavel Lelyukhin (to (Cyprus) Pafos, previously on loan to Spartak Moscow)
—	DF	RUS	Maksim Nenakhov (on loan to SKA-Khabarovsk, previously on loan to Tyumen)
—	MF	RUS	Mikhail Mogulkin (to KAMAZ Naberezhnye Chelny, previously on loan to Veles Moscow)

=== Krasnodar ===
In: Note: Flags indicate national team as defined under FIFA eligibility rules; some limited exceptions apply. Players may hold more than one non-FIFA nationality.

No.	Pos.	Nation	Player
3	DF	ISL	Jón Guðni Fjóluson (from (Sweden) Norrköping)
5	DF	SRB	Uroš Spajić (from (Belgium) Anderlecht)
9	FW	RUS	Ari (end of loan to Lokomotiv Moscow)
15	DF	RUS	Nikolay Markov (from Kuban Krasnodar)
20	MF	PER	Christian Cueva (from (Brazil) São Paulo)
22	DF	RUS	Ivan Taranov (from Krylia Sovetov Samara)
23	MF	RUS	Anatoli Katrich (from Dynamo Moscow)
38	MF	RUS	David Kokoyev
46	DF	RUS	Sergei Novikov
56	MF	RUS	Bogdan Reykhmen
57	DF	RUS	Rashid Chichba
58	GK	RUS	Stanislav Agkatsev
60	FW	RUS	German Onugkha (from Volgar Astrakhan)
64	FW	RUS	Roman Simonov
71	FW	RUS	Roman Khodunov (from Akademiya Futbola Rostov-on-Don)
79	MF	RUS	Igor Yurchenko
80	GK	RUS	Denis Mukhin
82	FW	RUS	Sergei Volkov
83	DF	RUS	Stepan Nikitin
84	DF	RUS	Vyacheslav Litvinov
86	DF	RUS	Daniil Kornyushin
89	MF	RUS	Dmitry Stotsky (from Ufa)
91	MF	RUS	Nikita Molochnikov
95	DF	RUS	Danil Benedyk
96	MF	RUS	Vladislav Misan
97	FW	RUS	Ruslan Pidlisnyak

Out: Note: Flags indicate national team as defined under FIFA eligibility rules; some limited exceptions apply. Players may hold more than one non-FIFA nationality.

No.	Pos.	Nation	Player
6	DF	SWE	Andreas Granqvist (to (Sweden) Helsingborg)
9	FW	ROU	Andrei Ivan (on loan to (Austria) Rapid Wien)
10	FW	RUS	Fyodor Smolov (to Lokomotiv Moscow)
11	MF	RUS	Ilya Zhigulyov (on loan to Ural Yekaterinburg, previously on loan to Tosno)
13	DF	RUS	Ihor Kalinin (to Rubin Kazan)
18	MF	RUS	Oleg Shatov (end of loan from Zenit Saint Petersburg)
21	MF	COL	Ricardo Laborde (to (Cyprus) Anorthosis Famagusta)
22	MF	RUS	Joãozinho (to Dynamo Moscow)
26	DF	RUS	Aleksei Gritsayenko (on loan to Yenisey Krasnoyarsk)
44	MF	RUS	Konstantin Samarenkin
46	DF	RUS	Vitali Stezhko (on loan to (Armenia) Pyunik)
52	GK	RUS	Yevgeni Latyshonok (to Krasnodar-2)
55	DF	RUS	Renat Yanbayev (released)
57	DF	RUS	Ilya Nasonkin (to Rotor Volgograd)
58	FW	RUS	Aleksandr Sergeyev (to Volga Ulyanovsk)
71	FW	RUS	Aleksandr Butenko (on loan to (Moldova) Milsami Orhei)
73	GK	RUS	Nikita Yegyazarov (to Krasnodar-3)
83	MF	RUS	Inal Cherchesov
84	GK	RUS	Anton Fedyushkin
86	FW	RUS	Valeri Manko (to SKA Rostov-on-Don)
92	DF	RUS	Ivan Takhmazov (to Akademiya Futbola Rostov-on-Don)
96	FW	RUS	Dmitri Yaskov
—	DF	RUS	Yevgeny Nesterenko (to Biolog-Novokubansk, previously on loan to Chayka Peschanokopskoye)
—	DF	RUS	Maksim Starkov (to (Armenia) Ararat Yerevan, previously on loan to Dynamo Bryansk)
—	MF	RUS	Dmitri Bakay (to Syzran-2003, previously on loan to Chernomorets Novorossiysk)
—	MF	RUS	Aleksandr Morgunov (to Khimki, previously on loan to Afips Afipsky)
—	MF	RUS	Vyacheslav Podberyozkin (to Rubin Kazan, previously on loan)
—	FW	RUS	Ilya Belous (to Khimki, previously on loan to Afips Afipsky)
—	FW	RUS	Ruslan Bolov (to Khimki, previously on loan to Avangard Kursk)
—	FW	RUS	Dmitry Vorobyov (released, previously on loan to Afips Afipsky)

=== Krylia Sovetov Samara ===
In: Note: Flags indicate national team as defined under FIFA eligibility rules; some limited exceptions apply. Players may hold more than one non-FIFA nationality.

No.	Pos.	Nation	Player
1	GK	RUS	Sergey Ryzhikov (from Rubin Kazan)
2	DF	RUS	Vladimir Poluyakhtov (from Anzhi Makhachkala)
3	DF	RUS	Georgi Tigiyev (on loan from Spartak Moscow)
5	DF	SLO	Miral Samardžić (from Anzhi Makhachkala)
11	FW	AZE	Ramil Sheydayev (from (Turkey) Trabzonspor)\
18	DF	URU	Agustín Rogel (from (Uruguay) Nacional)
22	FW	SRB	Vanja Vučićević (from (Serbia) Red Star Belgrade)
28	MF	ROU	Paul Anton (from Anzhi Makhachkala)
39	DF	UZB	Vitaliy Denisov (on loan from Lokomotiv Moscow)
44	DF	RUS	Nikita Chicherin (from Yenisey Krasnoyarsk)
45	FW	RUS	Vladimir Tyavin
46	MF	RUS	Bakhadur Sokolov (from Krylia Sovetov-2 Samara)
47	MF	RUS	Aleksei Karasyov
48	MF	RUS	Maksim Mukhin
51	GK	RUS	Yegor Lyubakov (from Krylia Sovetov-2 Samara)
52	MF	RUS	Danila Smirnov (from Krylia Sovetov-2 Samara)
53	DF	RUS	Nikita Kotin
54	MF	RUS	Denis Kravchenko
55	MF	RUS	Aleksandr Bogomolov (from Krylia Sovetov-2 Samara)
56	MF	RUS	Ilya Buryukin (from Krylia Sovetov-2 Samara)
57	MF	RUS	Ilya Volnov (from Krylia Sovetov-2 Samara)
58	DF	RUS	Vladislav Shchetinin
59	MF	RUS	Konstantin Shamayev (from Krylia Sovetov-2 Samara)
60	DF	RUS	Aleksandr Nesterov (from Krylia Sovetov-2 Samara)
61	MF	RUS	Aleksandr Bosov (from Krylia Sovetov-2 Samara)
62	DF	RUS	Nikita Verkhunov (from Krylia Sovetov-2 Samara)
63	DF	RUS	Pablo Davydov (from Krylia Sovetov-2 Samara)
69	GK	RUS	Yegor Golenkov
71	GK	RUS	Danil Beltyukov
89	MF	FRA	Yohan Mollo (from (Qatar) Al-Rayyan)
91	MF	RUS	Pavel Yakovlev (from Anzhi Makhachkala)
94	MF	RUS	Viktor Gryazin
99	FW	RUS	Maksim Kanunnikov (from SKA-Khabarovsk)

Out: Note: Flags indicate national team as defined under FIFA eligibility rules; some limited exceptions apply. Players may hold more than one non-FIFA nationality.

No.	Pos.	Nation	Player
3	DF	RUS	Dmitri Yatchenko (to Yenisey Krasnoyarsk)
4	DF	RUS	Ivan Taranov (to Krasnodar)
5	DF	RUS	Ali Gadzhibekov (on loan to Yenisey Krasnoyarsk)
10	MF	RUS	Azer Aliyev (to Ufa)
22	FW	RUS	Sergey Samodin (to Shinnik Yaroslavl)
25	MF	RUS	Vladislav Kulik (to Anzhi Makhachkala)
25	GK	RUS	Mikhail Oparin (to SKA-Khabarovsk, previously from Tosno)
27	MF	RUS	Danil Klyonkin (to Tambov)
28	GK	RUS	Artyom Leonov (to SKA-Khabarovsk)
77	GK	GEO	Giorgi Loria (released, previously on loan to Anzhi Makhachkala)
77	MF	RUS	Svyatoslav Georgiyevsky
88	GK	RUS	Vitali Shilnikov (on loan to Syzran-2003)
98	FW	RUS	Ilya Viznovich (on loan to Luch Vladivostok)
—	GK	RUS	Bogdan Ovsyannikov (released, previously on loan to (Portugal) União de Leiria)
—	MF	RUS	Vyacheslav Zinkov (released, previously on loan to Zenit Saint Petersburg)

=== Lokomotiv Moscow ===
In: Note: Flags indicate national team as defined under FIFA eligibility rules; some limited exceptions apply. Players may hold more than one non-FIFA nationality.

No.	Pos.	Nation	Player
3	DF	NGR	Brian Idowu (from Amkar Perm)
5	DF	GER	Benedikt Höwedes (from (Germany) Schalke 04)
7	MF	POL	Grzegorz Krychowiak (on loan from (France) Paris Saint-Germain)
9	FW	RUS	Fyodor Smolov (from Krasnodar)
24	FW	POR	Eder (from (France) Lille, previously on loan)
32	MF	RUS	Georgi Makhatadze (from Rubin Kazan)
34	DF	RUS	Timofei Margasov (end of loan to Tosno)
35	DF	RUS	Roman Kvataniya (from Anzhi Makhachkala)
38	MF	RUS	Nikolai Titkov (from UOR #5 Yegoryevsk)
39	FW	RUS	Sergei Bely
41	MF	RUS	Kirill Klimov
48	DF	RUS	Dmitri Sukharev
49	GK	RUS	Daniil Kuznetsov
57	MF	RUS	Kirill Shchetinin (from own academy)
58	MF	RUS	Timur Lobanov (from Rubin Kazan)
60	DF	RUS	Maks Dziov
63	MF	RUS	Nikita Sharkov
66	GK	RUS	Timur Kraykov (on loan from Sokol Saratov)
68	DF	RUS	Georgi Chetvergov
73	MF	RUS	Maksim Petrov
78	DF	RUS	Daniil Chernyakov
82	DF	RUS	Ilya Petukhov
85	DF	RUS	Yaroslav Garastyuk
87	DF	RUS	Artyom Sukhanov (from own academy)
95	DF	RUS	German Osnov
96	FW	RUS	Rifat Zhemaletdinov (from Rubin Kazan)
99	MF	RUS	Nikita Frasinyuk

Out: Note: Flags indicate national team as defined under FIFA eligibility rules; some limited exceptions apply. Players may hold more than one non-FIFA nationality.

No.	Pos.	Nation	Player
5	DF	SRB	Nemanja Pejčinović (to (China) Changchun Yatai)
9	FW	RUS	Ari (end of loan from Krasnodar)
11	MF	RUS	Alan Kasaev (on loan to Baltika Kaliningrad)
13	MF	RUS	Arshak Koryan (on loan to Khimki)
19	FW	RUS	Dmitri Sychev
21	MF	RUS	Amir Natkho (to (Romania) Viitorul Constanța)
29	DF	UZB	Vitaliy Denisov (on loan to Krylia Sovetov Samara)
38	MF	RUS	Andrei Shigorev
39	MF	RUS	Artyom Ponikarov (to Torpedo Moscow)
41	GK	RUS	Miroslav Lobantsev (to Rotor Volgograd)
46	FW	RUS	Pavel Patsekin
48	MF	RUS	Oleg Kozhemyakin (to Shinnik Yaroslavl)
49	GK	RUS	Roman Khalanchuk
50	MF	RUS	Denis Anisimov (to Sokol Saratov)
52	DF	RUS	Mikhail Tarasov
53	FW	RUS	Ivan Zhurin
56	DF	RUS	Feodor Andryukhin
57	FW	RUS	Artyom Galadzhan (on loan to Orenburg)
58	MF	RUS	Fyodor Stukalov (to (Armenia) Ararat Yerevan)
63	GK	RUS	Dmitry Landakov (to Orenburg)
68	MF	RUS	Georgi Kyurdzhiyev (to Mashuk-KMV Pyatigorsk)
70	GK	RUS	Aleksandr Nikolayev
73	DF	RUS	Aleksei Tatarchuk (to Khimki-M)
74	GK	RUS	Pavel Kovalyov (to Dynamo Stavropol)
78	FW	RUS	Ilya Rubtsov (to Khimki-M)
80	DF	RUS	Erving Joe Botaka-Ioboma
82	DF	RUS	Aleksandr Zakuskin (to Murom)
85	MF	RUS	Roman Nuriyev
87	MF	RUS	Seyran Malkhasyan
92	DF	RUS	Aleksandr Yarkovoy (to Ryazan)
95	DF	RUS	Aleksei Gubochkin (to Akademiya Futbola Rostov-on-Don)
97	DF	RUS	Dzhamshed Rakhmonov
99	MF	RUS	Svyatoslav Muradov
—	FW	RUS	Igor Portnyagin (on loan to Khimki, previously on loan to Ural Yekaterinburg)

=== Orenburg ===
In: Note: Flags indicate national team as defined under FIFA eligibility rules; some limited exceptions apply. Players may hold more than one non-FIFA nationality.

No.	Pos.	Nation	Player
3	DF	BLR	Mikhail Sivakow (from Amkar Perm)
7	FW	SRB	Đorđe Despotović (from (Kazakhstan) Astana)
8	MF	CRO	Danijel Miškić (from (Slovenia) Olimpija Ljubljana)
11	FW	RUS	Andrea Chukanov (from Tyumen)
31	DF	RUS	Vitali Shakhov (from Tosno)
32	MF	RUS	Artyom Kulishev (from Dynamo Saint Petersburg)
38	DF	RUS	Daniil Krivoruchko (from Orenburg-2)
41	DF	RUS	Sergei Pikalov
42	DF	RUS	Valentin Prilepin (from Orenburg-2)
46	MF	RUS	Artyom Apalkin (from Orenburg-2)
54	DF	RUS	Yuri Popov
56	GK	RUS	Aleksandr Dovbnya (from SKA-Khabarovsk)
59	MF	RUS	Ilya Anokhin
62	MF	RUS	Vladislav Kalinin
63	GK	RUS	Ilya Uchkin
64	MF	RUS	Andrei Kireyev
65	MF	RUS	Anton Antonenko (from Orenburg-2)
66	MF	RUS	Mikhail Bakayev (from Anzhi Makhachkala)
67	DF	RUS	Kirill Artemyev
69	FW	RUS	Aleksandr Matveychuk (from Orenburg-2)
73	GK	RUS	Dmitry Landakov (from Lokomotiv Moscow)
77	MF	RUS	Nikita Malyarov (from Kuban Krasnodar)
81	DF	RUS	Lev Belousov
82	MF	RUS	Vildan Amerkhanov (from Orenburg-2)
84	MF	RUS	Aleksandr Belousov
88	FW	RUS	Artyom Galadzhan (on loan from Lokomotiv Moscow)
90	GK	RUS	Aleksei Kenyaykin (from Orenburg-2)
92	MF	RUS	Denis Fedenko (from Orenburg-2)
93	FW	RUS	Mikhail Kukushkin (from Orenburg-2)
—	MF	POR	Ricardo Alves (from (Slovenia) Olimpija Ljubljana)

Out: Note: Flags indicate national team as defined under FIFA eligibility rules; some limited exceptions apply. Players may hold more than one non-FIFA nationality.

No.	Pos.	Nation	Player
3	DF	RUS	Maksim Plopa (to Baltika Kaliningrad)
5	MF	RUS	Roman Vorobyov (to Rotor Volgograd)
9	MF	RUS	Vladimir Parnyakov (to Tyumen)
11	MF	RUS	Dmitri Yefremov (end of loan from CSKA Moscow)
20	MF	RUS	Andrei Mironov (to Torpedo Moscow)
21	MF	RUS	Denis Kaykov (to Volga Ulyanovsk)
24	MF	RUS	Igor Koronov (to Tyumen)
26	MF	TJK	Farkhod Vosiyev (to Tyumen)
27	MF	RUS	Artyom Popov (to Rotor Volgograd)
33	MF	RUS	Igor Udaly (end of loan from Anzhi Makhachkala)
43	MF	RUS	Igor Yepifanov
52	GK	RUS	Yuri Panteleyev
54	MF	RUS	Vadim Bilyukov (to Volga Ulyanovsk)
55	MF	RUS	Dmitri Chvanov
84	DF	RUS	Yegor Strizhakov
90	FW	RUS	Artyom Delkin (to Olimpiyets Nizhny Novgorod)
99	FW	RUS	Khasan Mamtov (to Tambov)
—	FW	SVK	Michal Ďuriš (to (Cyprus) Anorthosis Famagusta, previously on loan)
—	FW	RUS	Islam Mashukov (to Spartak Nalchik, previously on loan to Khimki)

=== Rostov ===
In: Note: Flags indicate national team as defined under FIFA eligibility rules; some limited exceptions apply. Players may hold more than one non-FIFA nationality.

No.	Pos.	Nation	Player
5	DF	SWE	Dennis Hadžikadunić (from (Sweden) Malmö)
7	MF	RUS	Artur Yusupov (from Zenit Saint Petersburg, previously on loan)
8	MF	RUS	Ayaz Guliyev (from Spartak Moscow, previously on loan)
10	MF	RUS	Aleksandr Zuyev (from Spartak Moscow, previously on loan)
17	MF	SWE	Anton Salétros (from (Sweden) AIK)
23	FW	ISL	Viðar Örn Kjartansson (from (Israel) Maccabi Tel Aviv)
25	DF	RUS	Arseny Logashov (from Baltika Kaliningrad)
51	MF	RUS	Sergei Lukyanov
57	MF	RUS	Nikita Kolotievskiy
62	GK	RUS	Artyom Yesaulenko (end of loan to Chayka Peschanokopskoye)
64	MF	RUS	Andrei Napolov (from SKA Rostov-on-Don)
65	DF	RUS	Pavel Zenzura (from Akademiya Futbola Rostov-on-Don)
67	MF	RUS	Vadim Lazarev (from CSKA Moscow academy)
68	MF	RUS	Ruslan Fishchenko (from CSKA Moscow academy)
79	GK	RUS	Daniil Frolkin
92	DF	RUS	Artyom Shchadin (from Kuban Krasnodar)
97	MF	RUS	Gocha Gogrichiani (from own academy)

Out: Note: Flags indicate national team as defined under FIFA eligibility rules; some limited exceptions apply. Players may hold more than one non-FIFA nationality.

No.	Pos.	Nation	Player
16	DF	RUS	Yevgeni Makeyev (to Sochi)
17	MF	MLI	Moussa Doumbia (to (France) Reims)
19	MF	RUS	Khoren Bayramyan (on loan to Rubin Kazan)
21	MF	RUS	Aleksandr Sapeta (to Nizhny Novgorod)
22	FW	RUS	Vladimir Dyadyun (to Baltika Kaliningrad)
22	MF	RUS	Reziuan Mirzov (on loan to Arsenal Tula, previously on loan to Tosno)
23	MF	MDA	Valeriu Ciupercă (to Tambov)
33	DF	RUS	Konstantin Pliyev (on loan to Baltika Kaliningrad)
37	MF	RUS	Sergei Zabrodin (to SKA Rostov-on-Don)
38	MF	RUS	Ilya Maletsky
42	DF	RUS	Maksim Skrynnik (on loan to SKA Rostov-on-Don)
72	MF	RUS	Sergei Ponedelnik
76	MF	RUS	Elvin Talibov
79	GK	RUS	Danila Yermakov (to Spartak Moscow)
82	MF	RUS	Nikita Kryukov (on loan to Zenit-Izhevsk)
93	FW	RUS	Dmitri Solovyov (on loan to Veles Moscow)
96	DF	RUS	Dmitri Khristis (to Akademiya Futbola Rostov-on-Don)
97	GK	RUS	Yevgeni Goshev (to Shinnik Yaroslavl)
98	DF	RUS	Sergei Kiryakov
99	MF	RUS	Andrei Potapov (to Saturn Ramenskoye)
—	MF	IRI	Saeid Ezatolahi (on loan to (England) Reading, previously on loan to Amkar Perm)
—	MF	RUS	Igor Kireyev (to Mordovia Saransk, previously on loan to Avangard Kursk)
—	MF	RUS	Aleksandr Troshechkin (on loan to Avangard Kursk, previously on loan to Tosno)
—	FW	GEO	Nika Kacharava (to (Cyprus) Anorthosis Famagusta, previously on loan to (Poland) Korona Kielce)

=== Rubin Kazan ===
In: Note: Flags indicate national team as defined under FIFA eligibility rules; some limited exceptions apply. Players may hold more than one non-FIFA nationality.

No.	Pos.	Nation	Player
3	DF	RUS	Ibragim Tsallagov (on loan from Zenit Saint Petersburg)
4	DF	ESP	Chico (from (Spain) Granada)
5	DF	CRO	Filip Uremović (from (Slovenia) Olimpija Ljubljana)
7	MF	RUS	Vyacheslav Podberyozkin (from Krasnodar, previously on loan)
10	FW	RUS	Dmitry Poloz (on loan from Zenit Saint Petersburg)
11	FW	RUS	Aleksandr Bukharov (free agent)
19	MF	RUS	Khoren Bayramyan (on loan from Rostov)
21	GK	RUS	Yegor Baburin (on loan from Zenit Saint Petersburg)
23	GK	RUS	Ivan Konovalov (from (Belarus) Torpedo-BelAZ Zhodino)
52	MF	RUS	Denis Fedorochev (from Amkar Perm)
54	DF	RUS	Stepan Ostanin (from Amkar Perm)
56	MF	RUS	Maksim Sedov (from Amkar Perm)
57	DF	RUS	Pavel Korkin (free agent)
70	MF	RUS	Georgy Bazayev
97	MF	RUS	Adil Mukhametzyanov
—	DF	RUS	Ihor Kalinin (from Krasnodar)

Out: Note: Flags indicate national team as defined under FIFA eligibility rules; some limited exceptions apply. Players may hold more than one non-FIFA nationality.

No.	Pos.	Nation	Player
1	GK	RUS	Sergey Ryzhikov (to Krylia Sovetov Samara)
2	DF	RUS	Oleg Kuzmin (retired)
26	DF	ROU	Gabriel Enache (to (Serbia) Partizan)
53	FW	RUS	Nikita Goldobin (on loan to Zvezda Perm)
58	MF	RUS	Timur Lobanov (to Lokomotiv Moscow)
61	MF	TUR	Gökdeniz Karadeniz (retired)
64	DF	RUS	Kirill Lukyanchikov (to Ural Yekaterinburg)
66	MF	ECU	Christian Noboa (end of loan from Zenit Saint Petersburg)
68	MF	RUS	Ilya Snezhkin
71	MF	BUL	Ivelin Popov (end of loan from Spartak Moscow)
72	FW	RUS	Nikita Tsygankov
74	MF	RUS	Maksim Lukoyanov (to Ural-2 Yekaterinburg)
75	MF	RUS	Nikita Torgashov (to Sokol Saratov)
76	DF	RUS	Semyon Ilyukhin
85	MF	RUS	Ilzat Akhmetov (to CSKA Moscow)
96	FW	RUS	Rifat Zhemaletdinov (to Lokomotiv Moscow)
—	MF	BEL	Maxime Lestienne (to (Belgium) Standard Liège, previously on loan to (Spain) Málaga)
—	DF	SWE	Emil Bergström (to (Netherlands) Utrecht, previously on loan to (Switzerland) Grasshoppers)
—	DF	RUS	Sergei Doronin (released, previously on loan to Neftekhimik Nizhnekamsk)
—	DF	ESP	Sergio Sánchez (to (Spain) Espanyol, previously on loan)
—	MF	RUS	Georgi Makhatadze (to Lokomotiv Moscow, previously on loan to SKA-Khabarovsk)
—	MF	RUS	Ruslan Shcherbin (to KAMAZ Naberezhnye Chelny, previously on loan)
—	FW	RUS	Dmitri Kamenshchikov (to Neftekhimik Nizhnekamsk, previously on loan)
—	FW	ESP	Rubén Rochina (to (Spain) Levante, previously on loan)

=== Spartak Moscow ===
In: Note: Flags indicate national team as defined under FIFA eligibility rules; some limited exceptions apply. Players may hold more than one non-FIFA nationality.

No.	Pos.	Nation	Player
2	DF	FRA	Samuel Gigot (from (Belgium) Gent)
26	MF	FIN	Roman Eremenko (from CSKA Moscow)
28	FW	SEN	Thierno Thioub (from (Senegal) Stade de Mbour)
30	GK	RUS	Danila Yermakov (from Rostov)
31	GK	RUS	Anton Shitov (from Ararat Moscow)
37	MF	RUS	Georgi Melkadze (end of loan to Tosno)
39	DF	RUS	Pavel Maslov (from Tyumen)
56	DF	RUS	Ilya Gaponov (from Strogino Moscow)
68	DF	RUS	Ruslan Litvinov
71	MF	BUL	Ivelin Popov (end of loan to Rubin Kazan)
75	DF	RUS	Fanil Sungatulin
78	MF	RUS	Maksim Danilin (from own academy)
85	FW	RUS	Nikita Sudarikov (from own academy)
88	MF	RUS	Aleksandr Tashayev (from Dynamo Moscow)
93	DF	RUS	Nikita Morgunov

Out: Note: Flags indicate national team as defined under FIFA eligibility rules; some limited exceptions apply. Players may hold more than one non-FIFA nationality.

No.	Pos.	Nation	Player
5	DF	GER	Serdar Tasci
10	MF	NED	Quincy Promes (to (Spain) Sevilla)
17	DF	RUS	Georgi Tigiyev (on loan to Krylia Sovetov Samara)
18	MF	RUS	Zelimkhan Bakayev (on loan to Arsenal Tula)
20	DF	RUS	Igor Leontyev (to Tyumen)
22	DF	RUS	Konstantin Shcherbakov (to Rotor-2 Volgograd)
31	DF	RUS	Oleg Krasilnichenko (to Neftekhimik Nizhnekamsk)
33	DF	SRB	Nikola Maksimović (end of loan from (Italy) Napoli)
39	DF	RUS	Ilya Ivanov (to Arsenal Tula)
41	GK	RUS	Sergei Lazarev (to Dolgoprudny)
42	MF	RUS	Denis Patsev (to Arsenal Tula)
49	FW	POR	Idrisa Sambú (on loan to (Belgium) Mouscron)
50	MF	CRO	Mario Pašalić (end of loan from (England) Chelsea)
56	GK	RUS	Vadim Averkiyev
60	FW	ZAM	Fashion Sakala (to (Belgium) Oostende)
63	DF	RUS	Shamsiddin Shanbiyev
69	FW	RUS	Denis Davydov (on loan to (Latvia) Spartaks Jūrmala)
70	FW	RUS	Yegor Nikulin (to Shinnik Yaroslavl)
78	DF	RUS	Pavel Lelyukhin (end of loan from Dynamo Moscow)
80	MF	RUS	Kirill Orekhov (to Arsenal Tula)
85	GK	RUS	Vlad Yeleferenko
93	DF	RUS	Artyom Sokol (to Arsenal Tula)
94	DF	RUS	Ivan Khomukha (to SKA-Khabarovsk)
—	MF	RUS	Ayaz Guliyev (to Rostov, previously on loan)
—	DF	RUS	Denis Kutin (to Armavir, previously on loan to Tosno)
—	MF	RUS	Aleksandr Zuyev (to Rostov, previously on loan)

=== Ufa ===
In: Note: Flags indicate national team as defined under FIFA eligibility rules; some limited exceptions apply. Players may hold more than one non-FIFA nationality.

No.	Pos.	Nation	Player
11	FW	SLO	Lovro Bizjak (from (Slovenia) Domžale)
15	DF	RUS	Aleksandr Putsko (end of loan to SKA-Khabarovsk)
29	MF	LUX	Olivier Thill (from (Luxembourg) Progrès Niederkorn)
45	MF	RUS	Marsel Yenikeyev
50	MF	RUS	Konstantin Kovalchuk
56	DF	RUS	Danil Krugovoy (from Zenit-2 Saint Petersburg)
58	DF	RUS	Nikita Nedorezkov
60	MF	RUS	Vladimir Zubarev (end of loan to Khimki)
61	GK	RUS	Igor Maltsev
62	GK	RUS	Airat Safin
63	GK	RUS	Nikita Yatsenko
64	MF	RUS	Nikita Mashko
67	DF	RUS	Lev Safronov
68	FW	RUS	Daniil Zaplakhov
70	FW	RUS	Igor Andreyev
71	DF	RUS	Nikita Gurkov
73	MF	RUS	Andrei Podgornov
74	DF	RUS	Ilya Vydrin
75	MF	RUS	Denis Reshetnikov
77	MF	RUS	Azer Aliyev (from Krylia Sovetov Samara)
79	MF	RUS	Yevgeni Bazhanov
82	MF	RUS	Nikita Belousov
84	DF	RUS	Eduard Gavrilov
85	DF	RUS	Ilya Shudrov
87	MF	RUS	Igor Bezdenezhnykh (end of loan to Olimpiyets Nizhny Novgorod)
89	FW	RUS	Denis Timofeyev
93	MF	RUS	Mikhail Izvekov
95	FW	RUS	Arseni Zhugin
96	FW	RUS	Daud Garifullin
97	MF	RUS	Mikhail Kolesnikov

Out: Note: Flags indicate national team as defined under FIFA eligibility rules; some limited exceptions apply. Players may hold more than one non-FIFA nationality.

No.	Pos.	Nation	Player
21	FW	NGR	Kehinde Fatai (to (Belarus) Dinamo Minsk)
22	DF	MDA	Victor Patrașco (on loan to Luch-Energiya Vladivostok)
23	MF	RUS	Danila Yemelyanov (to Ufa-2)
37	DF	RUS	Ruslan Khaziyev (to Ufa-2)
39	MF	RUS	Dmitry Stotsky (to Krasnodar)
47	MF	RUS	Artyom Yegorov (to Ufa-2)
51	MF	RUS	Mark Krivorog (to Ufa-2)
52	GK	RUS	Rem Saitgareyev (to Ufa-2)
54	GK	RUS	Yegor Podznyakov (to Ufa-2)
56	GK	RUS	Daniil Lyasov (to Ufa-2)
66	FW	RUS	Timur Kutlusurin (to Ufa-2)
67	MF	RUS	Artyom Shitov
69	DF	RUS	Nikita Popov (to Ufa-2)
70	MF	RUS	Nikolai Safronidi (retired)
72	MF	RUS	Valentin Videneyev (to Ufa-2)
77	FW	RUS	Yevgeni Priymak (to Ufa-2)
80	MF	RUS	Arseni Zdorovets (to Ufa-2)
81	DF	RUS	Anton Ladygin (to Ufa-2)
86	MF	RUS	Daniel Gumerov (to Ufa-2)
89	MF	RUS	Maksim Sidorov
91	MF	RUS	Andrey Vlasov (to Ufa-2)
92	DF	RUS	Vyacheslav Dyomin (to Ufa-2)
94	FW	RUS	Linar Mukhametshin (to Ufa-2)
98	MF	RUS	Ivan Oblyakov (to CSKA Moscow)
—	MF	RUS	Andrei Batyutin (on loan to Avangard Kursk, previously on loan to Dynamo Saint Petersburg)
—	FW	RUS	Islamnur Abdulavov (on loan to Rotor Volgograd, previously on loan to Tom Tomsk)

=== Ural Yekaterinburg ===
In: Note: Flags indicate national team as defined under FIFA eligibility rules; some limited exceptions apply. Players may hold more than one non-FIFA nationality.

No.	Pos.	Nation	Player
4	DF	RUS	Sergei Bryzgalov (from Anzhi Makhachkala)
18	DF	RUS	Dzhamaldin Khodzhaniyazov (from Baltika Kaliningrad)
20	FW	RUS	Andrei Panyukov (on loan from Zenit Saint Petersburg)
21	MF	SUI	Marco Aratore (from (Switzerland) St. Gallen)
33	GK	RUS	Vladimir Kutyryov
42	MF	RUS	Konstantin Sysoyev
49	FW	RUS	Sergei Itkin
54	MF	RUS	Sergei Krotov
56	MF	RUS	Vasili Koryukov
59	MF	RUS	Sergei Serchenkov (end of loan to (Armenia) Alashkert)
62	MF	RUS	Danil Khoroshev
64	DF	RUS	Ivan Vereshchagin
67	DF	RUS	Kirill Lukyanchikov (from Rubin Kazan)
70	MF	RUS	Ilya Zhigulyov (on loan from Krasnodar)
79	FW	RUS	Artyom Yusupov (end of loan to Tyumen)
88	FW	RUS	Pavel Pogrebnyak (from Tosno)

Out: Note: Flags indicate national team as defined under FIFA eligibility rules; some limited exceptions apply. Players may hold more than one non-FIFA nationality.

No.	Pos.	Nation	Player
2	DF	RUS	Vladimir Khozin (to Ararat-Armenia)
16	MF	RUS	Rezo Gavtadze
21	MF	UKR	Dmytro Khomchenovskyi (to (Ukraine) Zorya Luhansk)
22	DF	RUS	Kirill Kochnev (to Ural-2 Yekaterinburg)
24	GK	RUS	Yevgeni Zharikov
28	DF	RUS	Nikita Chernov (end of loan from CSKA Moscow)
29	FW	RUS	Elbeyi Guliyev
30	MF	RUS	Pavel Karpov
39	MF	RUS	Savva Knyazev
40	DF	RUS	Maksim Gorin (to Ural-2 Yekaterinburg)
41	FW	RUS	Vladislav Pavlyuchenko
42	FW	RUS	Nikita Belous (to Strogino Moscow)
43	MF	RUS	Aleksandr Golubtsov (to Ural-2 Yekaterinburg)
46	MF	RUS	Vyacheslav Berdnikov (to Ural-2 Yekaterinburg)
47	FW	RUS	Konstantin Reshetnikov (to Ural-2 Yekaterinburg)
51	MF	RUS	Volodya Israelyan (to Ural-2 Yekaterinburg)
54	MF	RUS	Nikita Muromsky
62	MF	RUS	Aleksandr Bunakov
64	MF	RUS	Pavel Kobzev (to Rotor-2 Volgograd)
69	MF	RUS	Andrey Sheptiy (to Ural-2 Yekaterinburg)
78	MF	RUS	Semyon Pomogayev
88	FW	RUS	Igor Portnyagin (end of loan from Lokomotiv Moscow)
91	GK	RUS	Aleksandr Shubin
99	FW	ARM	Edgar Manucharyan (to (Armenia) Alashkert)
—	GK	RUS	Dmitri Arapov (on loan to Chayka Peschanokopskoye, previously on loan to Volgar Astrakhan)
—	GK	RUS	Andrei Timofeyev (to Biolog-Novokubansk, previously on loan to Syzran-2003)
—	DF	RUS	Denis Fomin (to Tekstilshchik Ivanovo, previously on loan)
—	DF	SRB	Radovan Pankov (to (Serbia) Radnički Niš, previously on loan to (Cyprus) AEK Larnaca)
—	MF	RUS	Dmitri Korobov (to Avangard Kursk, previously on loan)
—	MF	RUS	Aleksandr Lomakin (on loan to Fakel Voronezh, previously on loan to Yenisey Krasnoyarsk)
—	MF	RUS	Aleksandr Shcherbakov (to (Cyprus) Enosis Neon Paralimni, previously on loan to (Armenia) Alashkert)
—	MF	RUS	Aleksandr Stavpets (to Tom Tomsk, previously on loan to Tyumen)

=== Yenisey Krasnoyarsk ===
In: Note: Flags indicate national team as defined under FIFA eligibility rules; some limited exceptions apply. Players may hold more than one non-FIFA nationality.

No.	Pos.	Nation	Player
3	DF	RUS	Dmitri Yatchenko (from Krylia Sovetov Samara)
5	MF	RUS	Pavel Komolov (from Amkar Perm)
6	MF	RUS	Dmitri Torbinski (from Baltika Kaliningrad)
7	MF	RUS	Aleksandr Zotov (on loan from Dynamo Moscow)
8	MF	NGR	Fegor Ogude (from Amkar Perm)
9	FW	AUT	Darko Bodul (from Amkar Perm)
13	DF	RUS	Aleksei Gritsayenko (on loan from Krasnodar)
18	MF	RUS	Aleksei Tretyakov
19	FW	RUS	Igor Abramov (from Dynamo Barnaul)
20	DF	RUS	Nikita Shestakov
25	MF	RUS	Timur Sakharov (from Kafa Feodosia)
26	DF	SRB	Rade Dugalić (from Tosno)
28	DF	RUS	Rostislav Vorobyov (from own academy)
29	DF	RUS	Matvey Uzhgin
31	GK	RUS	Roman Smirnov
33	DF	BUL	Petar Zanev (from Amkar Perm)
37	DF	RUS	Gleb Zakharov
50	MF	RUS	Yevgeni Morev
55	GK	RUS	David Yurchenko (from Tosno)
59	MF	RUS	Nikita Razdorskikh (from Dynamo Barnaul)
63	DF	RUS	Ali Gadzhibekov (on loan from Krylia Sovetov Samara)
69	MF	RUS	Aleksei Valyukov
70	MF	ALB	Enis Gavazaj (from (Albania) Skënderbeu Korçë)
76	MF	RUS	Timur Farrakhov (from Amkar Perm)
77	MF	RUS	Mikhail Kostyukov (from Amkar Perm)
80	MF	RUS	Danila Polshikov
88	MF	RUS	Denis Shnitov
90	MF	RUS	Denis Samoylov (from Tekstilshchik Ivanovo)
99	FW	RUS	Vladislav Lutashev

Out: Note: Flags indicate national team as defined under FIFA eligibility rules; some limited exceptions apply. Players may hold more than one non-FIFA nationality.

No.	Pos.	Nation	Player
3	DF	RUS	Aleksandr Zhirov (to (Germany) SV Sandhausen)
7	MF	RUS	Serder Serderov (to (Poland) Cracovia)
8	MF	LAT	Vladimirs Kamešs (to (Latvia) Liepāja)
12	DF	RUS	Aleksandr Novikov
19	DF	RUS	Konstantin Garbuz (to Tambov)
20	FW	RUS	Maksim Rudnev (on loan to Syzran-2003)
21	MF	RUS	Yegor Ivanov (injury)
32	DF	RUS	David Mildzikhov (on loan to Khimki)
36	FW	RUS	Stanislav Matyash (to Tyumen)
38	FW	RUS	Artur Maloyan (on loan to Tyumen)
39	DF	RUS	Maksim Vasilyev (to Rotor Volgograd)
44	DF	RUS	Nikita Chicherin (to Krylia Sovetov Samara)
55	MF	RUS	Aleksei Isayev (end of loan from Zenit Saint Petersburg)
77	MF	RUS	Vadim Steklov (end of loan from Arsenal Tula)
90	MF	RUS	Aleksandr Lomakin (end of loan from Ural Yekaterinburg)
92	DF	RUS	Pyotr Ten (to Tom Tomsk)
97	FW	RUS	Ilya Karpuk (to Ryazan)

=== Zenit Saint Petersburg ===
In: Note: Flags indicate national team as defined under FIFA eligibility rules; some limited exceptions apply. Players may hold more than one non-FIFA nationality.

No.	Pos.	Nation	Player
10	MF	ITA	Claudio Marchisio (from (Italy) Juventus)
13	DF	POR	Luís Neto (end of loan to (Turkey) Fenerbahçe)
16	MF	ECU	Christian Noboa (end of loan to Rubin Kazan)
17	MF	RUS	Oleg Shatov (end of loan to Krasnodar)
20	MF	SVK	Róbert Mak (end of loan to (Greece) PAOK)
22	FW	RUS	Artem Dzyuba (end of loan to Arsenal Tula)
28	DF	RUS	Yevgeni Chernov (end of loan to Tosno)
33	MF	BRA	Hernani (end of loan to (France) Saint-Étienne)
37	MF	RUS	Vadim Simutenkov
46	FW	RUS	Nikita Simdyankin
56	MF	RUS	Igor Vorobyov
57	DF	RUS	Aleksei Ivanov
58	FW	RUS	Roman Nogtev
60	MF	RUS	Daniil Knyazev
78	FW	RUS	Aleksandr Nekrasov (end of loan to (Latvia) Jelgava)
88	MF	RUS	Dmitry Bogayev (end of loan to SKA-Khabarovsk)
89	GK	RUS	Maksim Timofeyev

Out: Note: Flags indicate national team as defined under FIFA eligibility rules; some limited exceptions apply. Players may hold more than one non-FIFA nationality.

No.	Pos.	Nation	Player
4	DF	ITA	Domenico Criscito (to (Italy) Genoa)
7	FW	RUS	Dmitry Poloz (on loan to Rubin Kazan)
10	MF	ARG	Emiliano Rigoni (on loan to (Italy) Atalanta)
33	FW	RUS	Andrei Panyukov (on loan to Ural Yekaterinburg)
36	FW	RUS	Stanislav Krapukhin (to Tom Tomsk)
37	MF	RUS	Vladislav Sirotov (to (Poland) Zagłębie Lubin)
42	MF	RUS	Konstantin Kotov (to Luki-Energiya Velikiye Luki)
44	MF	ENG	Jacob Gardiner-Smith
46	FW	RUS	Ivan Kulyov
56	DF	RUS	Danil Krugovoy (to Ufa)
58	DF	RUS	Ilya Zuyev (to Urozhay Krasnodar)
64	FW	RUS	Daniil Lesovoy (on loan to Arsenal Tula)
68	MF	RUS	Yefim Boytsov (to Khimki)
71	GK	RUS	Yegor Baburin (on loan to Rubin Kazan)
88	MF	RUS	Vyacheslav Zinkov (end of loan from Krylia Sovetov Samara)
89	GK	RUS	Amir Fattakhov
91	FW	RUS	Yegor Denisov
94	FW	RUS	Nikita Povarov (to Leningradets Leningrad Oblast)
—	GK	RUS	Igor Obukhov (on loan to Tyumen, previously on loan to Arsenal Tula)
—	GK	RUS	Aleksandr Vasyutin (to (Norway) Sarpsborg, previously on loan to (Finland) Lahti)
—	DF	RUS	Maksim Karpov (on loan to Rotor Volgograd, previously on loan to SKA-Khabarovsk)
—	DF	RUS	Ivan Novoseltsev (on loan to Anzhi Makhachkala, previously on loan to Arsenal Tula)
—	MF	RUS	Aleksei Isayev (to (Azerbaijan) Sumgayit, previously on loan to Yenisey Krasnoyarsk)
—	MF	RUS	Viktor Fayzulin (retired)
—	MF	RUS	Aleksandr Ryazantsev (to Khimki, previously on loan to Amkar Perm)
—	MF	RUS	Ibragim Tsallagov (on loan to FC Rubin Kazan, previously on loan to Dynamo Moscow)
—	MF	RUS	Artur Yusupov (to Rostov, previously on loan)
