= 2016–17 FC Spartak Moscow season =

Spartak Moscow
2016–17 season
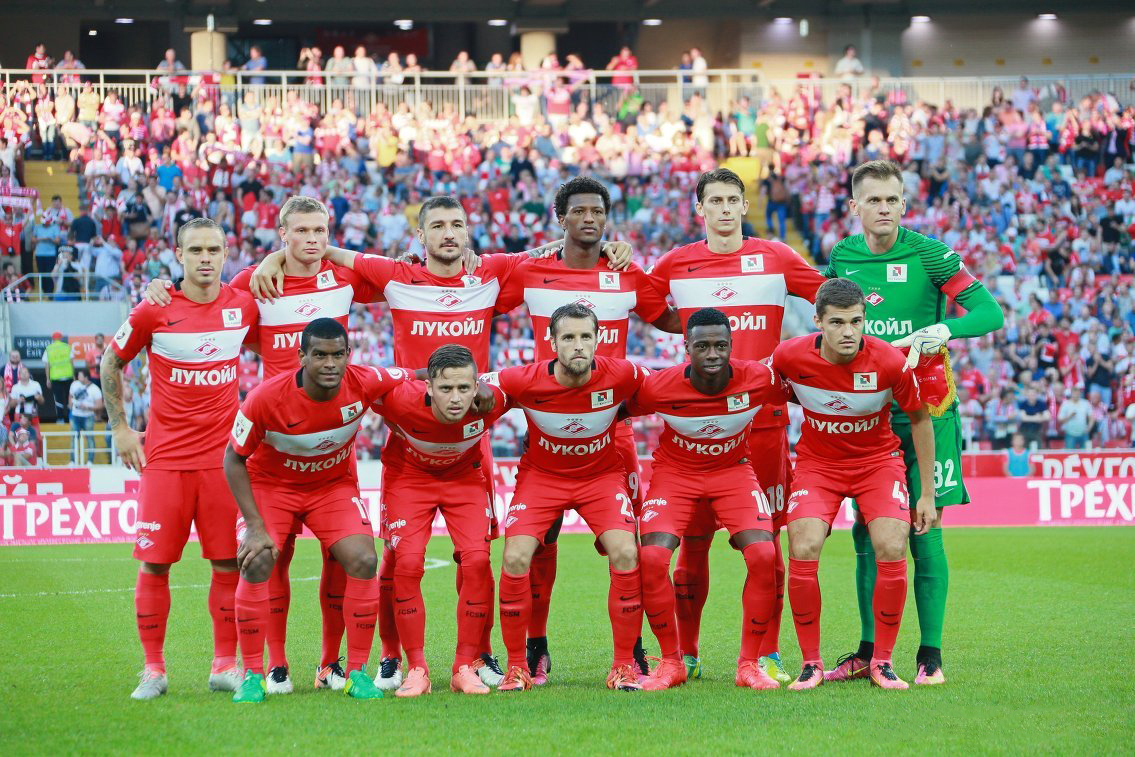
- Owner: Leonid Fedun
- Chairman: Sergey Rodionov
- Manager: Dmitri Alenichev (Until 5 August); Massimo Carrera (Caretaker) (5 August - 17 August); Massimo Carrera (Until 17 August)
- Stadium: Otkrytie Arena
- Premier League: 1st
- Russian Cup: Round of 32
- UEFA Europa League: Third qualifying round vs AEK Larnaca
- Top goalscorer: League: Quincy Promes (13); All: Quincy Promes (13)
- Highest home attendance: 44,884 vs CSKA Moscow
- Lowest home attendance: 17,449 vs Krylia Sovetov
Home colours	Away colours

The 2016–17 Spartak Moscow season was the 25th successive season that the club played in the Russian Premier League, the highest tier of association football in Russia.

== Key events ==
The pre-season friendlies were against NK Rudar Velenje, Istra 1961, FK Sarajevo, BSC Young Boys, and VfB Stuttgart. On 13 June former Juventus and Squadra Azzurra coach Massimo Carrera joined the club in an assistant manager role.

Manager Dmitri Alenichev resigned from his position after the Spartak's elimination from the UEFA Europa league third qualifying round by AEK Larnaka. Carrera was appointed caretaker manager. Coaches Egor Titov and Oleg Samatov also left the club. After a reported breaking down of the club's negotiations with Kurban Berdyev, on 17 August Massimo Carrera was promoted to a full managerial position after signing a two-year contract.

== Squad ==
As of match played 21 May 2017

No.	Name	Nationality	Position	Date of birth (age)	Signed from	Signed in	Contract ends	Apps.	Goals
Goalkeepers
1	Sergei Pesyakov	(Russia)	GK	28 May 1988 (aged 28)	Shinnik Yaroslavl	2009		44	0
21	Aleksandr Selikhov	(Russia)	GK	7 April 1994 (aged 23)	Amkar Perm	2016		1	0
30	Mikhail Filippov	(Russia)	GK	10 June 1992 (aged 24)	Znamya Truda Orekhovo-Zuyevo	2014		0	0
32	Artyom Rebrov	(Russia)	GK	4 March 1984 (aged 33)	Shinnik Yaroslavl	2011		110	0
41	Sergei Lazarev	(Russia)	GK	2 January 1998 (aged 19)	Youth Team	2016		0	0
56	Vadim Averkiyev	(Russia)	GK	1 June 1997 (aged 19)	Youth Team	2013		0	0
85	Vladislav Teryoshkin	(Russia)	GK	16 July 1995 (aged 21)	Youth Team	2012		0	0
86	Artyom Poplevchenkov	(Russia)	GK	9 June 2000 (aged 16)	Youth Team	2016		0	0
98	Aleksandr Maksimenko	(Russia)	GK	23 February 1998 (aged 19)	Youth Team	2014		0	0
Defenders
14	Georgi Dzhikiya	(Russia)	DF	21 November 1993 (aged 23)	Amkar Perm	2016		8	0
16	Salvatore Bocchetti	(Italy)	DF	30 November 1986 (aged 30)	Rubin Kazan	2013		74	4
17	Georgi Tigiyev	(Russia)	DF	20 June 1995 (aged 21)	loan from Anzhi Makhachkala	2017		4	0
18	Ilya Kutepov	(Russia)	DF	29 July 1993 (aged 23)	Akademiya Tolyatti	2012		38	0
22	Konstantin Shcherbakov	(Russia)	DF	20 March 1997 (aged 20)	Youth team	2013		0	0
23	Dmitri Kombarov	(Russia)	DF	22 January 1987 (aged 30)	Dynamo Moscow	2010		220	25
26	Leonid Mironov	(Russia)	DF	14 September 1998 (aged 18)	Youth team	2015		0	0
31	Oleg Krasilnichenko	(Russia)	DF	21 January 1997 (aged 20)	Youth team	2014		0	0
33	Maurício	(Brazil)	DF	20 September 1988 (aged 28)	loan from Lazio	2016		11	1
34	Yevgeni Makeyev	(Russia)	DF	24 July 1989 (aged 27)	Youth Team	2008		204	4
35	Serdar Tasci	(Germany)	DF	24 April 1987 (aged 30)	VfB Stuttgart	2013		62	3
38	Andrey Yeshchenko	(Russia)	DF	9 February 1984 (aged 33)	Anzhi Makhachkala	2016		27	1
46	Artyom Mamin	(Russia)	DF	25 July 1997 (aged 19)	Youth team	2014		0	0
48	Kirill Feofilaktov	(Russia)	DF	10 April 1998 (aged 19)	Youth team	2015		0	0
54	Ilya Ivanov	(Russia)	DF	9 January 1999 (aged 18)	Youth team	2015		0	0
60	Turgay Mokhbaliyev	(Russia)	DF	18 January 2000 (aged 17)	Youth team	2016		0	0
63	Shamsiddin Shanbiyev	(Russia)	DF	18 February 1997 (aged 20)	Youth team	2016		0	0
64	Denis Kutin	(Russia)	DF	5 October 1993 (aged 23)	Youth Team	2010		6	0
68	Daniil Petrunin	(Russia)	DF	10 June 1999 (aged 17)	Youth team	2015		0	0
76	Ivan Kostylev	(Russia)	DF	17 August 1996 (aged 20)	Youth team	2015		0	0
80	Ivan Khomukha	(Russia)	DF	14 July 1994 (aged 22)	Youth Team	2010		0	0
92	Nikolai Rasskazov	(Russia)	DF	4 January 1998 (aged 19)	Youth team	2015		0	0
93	Artyom Sokol	(Russia)	DF	11 June 1997 (aged 19)	Youth team	2014		0	0
94	Maksim Aktisov	(Russia)	DF	28 January 2000 (aged 17)	Youth team	2016		0	0
95	Audrey Yola Zepatta	(Cameroon)	DF	17 February 1999 (aged 18)	Universal Stars	2016		0	0
96	Aleksandr Likhachyov	(Russia)	DF	22 July 1996 (aged 20)	Youth team	2012		0	0
Midfielders
7	Jano Ananidze	(Georgia (country))	MF	10 October 1992 (aged 24)	Youth Team	2009		126	16
8	Denis Glushakov	(Russia)	MF	27 January 1987 (aged 30)	Lokomotiv Moscow	2013		114	15
10	Quincy Promes	(Netherlands)	MF	4 January 1992 (aged 25)	Twente	2014		91	44
11	Fernando	(Brazil)	MF	3 March 1992 (aged 25)	Sampdoria	2016		30	3
19	Aleksandr Samedov	(Russia)	MF	19 July 1984 (aged 32)	Lokomotiv Moscow	2017		68	12
25	Lorenzo Melgarejo	(Paraguay)	MF	10 August 1990 (aged 26)	Kuban Krasnodar	2016		33	4
27	Aleksandr Lomovitsky	(Russia)	MF	27 January 1998 (aged 19)	Youth team	2015		0	0
28	Yegor Rudkovsky	(Russia)	MF	4 March 1996 (aged 21)	Chertanovo Moscow	2016		0	0
29	Daniil Gorovykh	(Russia)	MF	30 January 1997 (aged 20)	Youth team	2014		0	0
37	Georgi Melkadze	(Russia)	MF	4 April 1997 (aged 20)	Youth team	2014		8	0
40	Artyom Timofeyev	(Russia)	MF	12 January 1994 (aged 23)	Your team	2012		9	0
42	Denis Patsev	(Russia)	MF	11 April 1999 (aged 18)	Youth team	2015		0	0
43	Pyotr Volodkin	(Russia)	MF	4 March 1999 (aged 18)	Youth team	2015		0	0
47	Roman Zobnin	(Russia)	MF	11 February 1994 (aged 23)	Dynamo Moscow	2016		32	2
51	Kirill Vollmer	(Russia)	MF	25 February 2000 (aged 17)	Youth team	2016		0	0
52	Igor Leontyev	(Russia)	MF	18 March 1994 (aged 23)	Your team	2011		6	0
53	Artyom Samsonov	(Russia)	MF	5 January 1994 (aged 23)	Your team	2011		1	0
57	Kirill Orekhov	(Russia)	MF	27 January 1999 (aged 18)	Youth team	2015		0	0
59	Nazar Gordeochuk	(Russia)	MF	11 April 1997 (aged 20)	Youth team	2014		0	0
71	Ivelin Popov	(Bulgaria)	MF	26 October 1987 (aged 29)	Kuban Krasnodar	2015		55	8
74	Nikita Kiselyov	(Russia)	MF	15 May 1998 (aged 19)	Youth team	2015		0	0
75	Mikhail Ignatov	(Russia)	MF	4 May 2000 (aged 17)	Youth team	2016		0	0
77	Konstantin Savichev	(Russia)	MF	6 March 1994 (aged 23)	Your team	2011		0	0
78	Zelimkhan Bakayev	(Russia)	MF	1 July 1996 (aged 20)	Youth team	2013		2	0
82	Ilya Mazurov	(Russia)	MF	7 June 1999 (aged 17)	Youth team	2015		0	0
83	Vladislav Panteleyev	(Russia)	MF	15 August 1996 (aged 20)	Youth team	2012		0	0
84	Boris Tsygankov	(Russia)	MF	17 April 1998 (aged 19)	Youth team	2015		0	0
87	Soltmurad Bakayev	(Russia)	MF	5 August 1999 (aged 17)	Youth team	2015		0	0
89	Vladlen Babayev	(Russia)	MF	12 October 1996 (aged 20)	Youth team	2012		0	0
97	Danil Poluboyarinov	(Russia)	MF	4 February 1997 (aged 20)	Youth team	2014		0	0
Forwards
9	Zé Luís	(Cape Verde)	FW	24 January 1991 (aged 26)	Braga	2015		48	15
12	Luiz Adriano	(Brazil)	FW	12 April 1987 (aged 30)	A.C. Milan	2016		8	2
36	Fashion Sakala	(Zambia)	FW	14 March 1997 (aged 20)	Zanaco	2016		0	0
39	Ippei Shinozuka	(Japan)	FW	20 March 1995 (aged 22)	Youth team	2012		0	0
49	Idrisa Sambú	(Portugal)	FW	27 March 1998 (aged 19)	Porto B	2016		0	0
61	Danila Proshlyakov	(Russia)	FW	8 March 2000 (aged 17)	Youth team	2016		0	0
66	Sylvanus Nimely	(Liberia)	FW	4 April 1998 (aged 19)	MFK Karviná	2016		0	0
67	Artyom Fedchuk	(Russia)	FW	20 December 1994 (aged 22)	Youth team	2011		0	0
69	Denis Davydov	(Russia)	FW	22 March 1995 (aged 22)	Youth team	2012		36	1
70	Yegor Nikulin	(Russia)	FW	16 January 1997 (aged 20)	U.D. Leiria	2016		0	0
79	Aleksandr Rudenko	(Russia)	FW	15 March 1999 (aged 18)	Youth team	2015		0	0
81	Daniil Lopatin	(Russia)	FW	20 December 2000 (aged 16)	Youth team	2016		0	0
Away on loan
17	Aleksandr Zuyev	(Russia)	MF	26 June 1996 (aged 20)	Youth team	2013		27	0
73	Ayaz Guliyev	(Russia)	MF	27 November 1996 (aged 20)	Youth team	2012		0	0
Players that left Spartak Moscow during the season
4	Sergei Parshivlyuk	(Russia)	DF	18 March 1989 (aged 28)	Youth Team	2007		170	3
5	Rômulo	(Brazil)	MF	19 September 1990 (aged 26)	Vasco da Gama	2012		70	3
13	Vladimir Granat	(Russia)	DF	22 May 1987 (aged 29)	Youth team	2015		15	0
36	Dmitri Malikov	(Russia)	FW	14 February 1997 (aged 20)	Youth team	2014		0	0
44	Pavel Yakovlev	(Russia)	FW	7 April 1991 (aged 26)	Youth Team	2008		92	12
45	Aleksandr Putsko	(Russia)	DF	24 February 1993 (aged 24)	Youth Team	2010		4	0
58	Aleksei Kozlov	(Russia)	GK	23 January 1999 (aged 18)	Youth Team	2015		0	0
94	Andrei Shigorev	(Russia)	DF	25 September 1997 (aged 19)	Youth team	2014		0	0
95	Vladislav Razdelkin	(Russia)	MF	13 April 1998 (aged 19)	Youth team	2015		0	0
	Yura Movsisyan	(Armenia)	FW	2 August 1987 (aged 29)	Krasnodar	2012		66	26

=== Out on loan ===
Note: Flags indicate national team as defined under FIFA eligibility rules; some limited exceptions apply. Players may hold more than one non-FIFA nationality.

No. / Pos. / Nation / Player; 17 / MF / RUS / Aleksandr Zuyev (at Krylia Sovetov)	No. / Pos. / Nation / Player; 73 / MF / RUS / Ayaz Guliyev (at Anzhi Makhachkala)

=== Left club during season ===
Note: Flags indicate national team as defined under FIFA eligibility rules; some limited exceptions apply. Players may hold more than one non-FIFA nationality.

No.	Pos.	Nation	Player
4	DF	RUS	Sergei Parshivlyuk (to Anzhi Makhachkala)
5	MF	BRA	Rômulo (to Flamengo)
13	DF	RUS	Vladimir Granat (to Rostov)
36	FW	RUS	Dmitri Malikov (to Nizhny Novgorod)
44	FW	RUS	Pavel Yakovlev (to Anzhi Makhachkala)

No.	Pos.	Nation	Player
45	DF	RUS	Aleksandr Putsko (to Ufa)
58	GK	RUS	Aleksei Kozlov
94	DF	RUS	Andrei Shigorev (to Saturn Ramenskoye)
95	MF	RUS	Vladislav Razdelkin (to Amkar Perm)
—	FW	ARM	Yura Movsisyan (to Real Salt Lake)

== Transfers ==
=== In ===
Date	Position	Nationality	Name	From	Fee	Ref.
Summer 2016	MF	(Russia)	Yegor Rudkovsky	Chertanovo Moscow	Undisclosed	
15 June 2016	MF	(Russia)	Roman Zobnin	Dynamo Moscow	Undisclosed	
16 June 2016	DF	(Russia)	Andrey Yeshchenko	Anzhi Makhachkala	Undisclosed	
14 July 2016	FW	(Russia)	Yegor Nikulin	União de Leiria	Undisclosed	
17 July 2016	MF	(Brazil)	Fernando	Sampdoria	Undisclosed	
22 November 2016	GK	(Russia)	Aleksandr Selikhov	Amkar Perm	Undisclosed	
26 December 2016	DF	(Russia)	Georgi Dzhikiya	Amkar Perm	Undisclosed	
16 January 2017	FW	(Brazil)	Luiz Adriano	A.C. Milan	Undisclosed	
16 January 2017	MF	(Russia)	Aleksandr Samedov	Lokomotiv Moscow	Undisclosed	
23 February 2017	DF	(Cameroon)	Audrey Yola Zepatta	Universal Stars	Undisclosed	
23 February 2017	FW	(Portugal)	Idrisa Sambú	Porto B	Undisclosed	
23 February 2017	FW	(Zambia)	Fashion Sakala	Zanaco	Undisclosed	
24 February 2017	FW	(Liberia)	Sylvanus Nimely	Karviná	Undisclosed	

=== Loans in ===
Date from	Position	Nationality	Name	From	Date to	Ref.
29 August 2016	DF	(Brazil)	Maurício	Lazio	End of Season	
24 February 2017	DF	(Russia)	Georgi Tigiyev	Anzhi Makhachkala	End of Season	

=== Out ===
Date	Position	Nationality	Name	To	Fee	Ref.
20 June 2016	FW	(Russia)	Aleksandr Kozlov	Tosno	Undisclosed	
23 June 2016	FW	(Russia)	Vladimir Obukhov	Kuban Krasnodar	Undisclosed	
10 October 2016	FW	(Armenia)	Yura Movsisyan	Real Salt Lake	Undisclosed	
20 February 2017	DF	(Russia)	Aleksandr Putsko	Ufa	Undisclosed	

=== Loans out ===
Date from	Position	Nationality	Name	To	Date to	Ref.
17 February 2017	MF	(Russia)	Aleksandr Zuyev	Krylia Sovetov	End of Season	
20 February 2017	MF	(Russia)	Ayaz Guliyev	Anzhi Makhachkala	End of Season	

=== Released ===
Date	Position	Nationality	Name	Joined	Date
14 June 2016	DF	(Russia)	Sergei Bryzgalov	Terek Grozny	14 June 2016
14 June 2016	MF	(Russia)	Aleksandr Zotov	Dynamo Moscow	15 June 2016
24 June 2016	DF	(Russia)	Kirill Kombarov	Tom Tomsk	26 June 2016
31 August 2016	DF	(Russia)	Vladimir Granat	Rostov	1 September 2016
31 August 2016	DF	(Russia)	Sergei Parshivlyuk	Anzhi Makhachkala	31 August 2016
31 August 2016	FW	(Russia)	Pavel Yakovlev	Anzhi Makhachkala	31 August 2016
31 December 2016	GK	(Russia)	Aleksei Kozlov		
31 December 2016	DF	(Russia)	Andrei Shigorev	Saturn Ramenskoye	
31 December 2016	MF	(Russia)	Vladislav Razdelkin	Amkar Perm	
31 December 2016	FW	(Russia)	Dmitri Malikov	Olimpiyets Nizhny Novgorod	
13 January 2017	MF	(Brazil)	Rômulo	Flamengo	13 January 2017
31 May 2017	GK	(Russia)	Mikhail Filippov	Yenisey Krasnoyarsk	
31 May 2017	DF	(Russia)	Ivan Kostylev	Spartak Kostroma	
31 May 2017	MF	(Russia)	Vladlen Babayev	Volgar Astrakhan	
31 May 2017	MF	(Russia)	Nazar Gordeochuk	Chayka Peschanokopskoye	
31 May 2017	MF	(Russia)	Daniil Gorovykh	Veles Moscow	
31 May 2017	MF	(Russia)	Nikita Kiselyov		

== Competitions ==
=== Russian Premier League ===
==== League table ====
Pos	Team	Pld	W	D	L	GF	GA	GD	Pts	Qualification or relegation
1	Spartak Moscow (C)	30	22	3	5	46	27	+19	69	Qualification for the Champions League group stage
2	CSKA Moscow	30	18	8	4	47	15	+32	62	Qualification for the Champions League third qualifying round
3	Zenit Saint Petersburg	30	18	7	5	50	19	+31	61	Qualification for the Europa League third qualifying round
4	Krasnodar	30	12	13	5	40	22	+18	49	Qualification for the Europa League third qualifying round
5	Terek Grozny	30	14	6	10	38	35	+3	48	

Source: Russian Premier League, Soccerway
Rules for classification: 1) Points; 2) Matches won; 3) Head-to-head points; 4) Head-to-head matches won; 5) Head-to-head goal difference; 6) Head-to-head goals scored; 7) Head-to-head away goals; 8) Goal difference; 9) Goals scored; 10) Away goals scored.
(C) Champions

==== Results by round ====
Round	1	2	3	4	5	6	7	8	9	10	11	12	13	14	15	16	17	18	19	20	21	22	23	24	25	26	27	28	29	30
Ground	H	H	A	H	A	H	A	H	A	H	A	H	A	H	A	A	H	A	H	A	H	A	H	A	H	A	H	A	H	A
Result	W	W	D	W	W	W	W	L	L	W	W	W	W	W	W	L	W	D	W	D	W	W	W	L	W	W	W	W	W	L
Position	1	2	2	1	1	1	1	1	1	1	1	1	1	1	1	1	1	1	1	1	1	1	1	1	1	1	1	1	1	1

Source: See Results
A = Away; H = Home; W = Win; D = Draw; L = Loss

==== Results ====
31 July 2016 1	Spartak Moscow	4–0	Arsenal Tula	Moscow
18:00 MSK (UTC+3)	Jano 6', 34'; Promes 47', 90+2'; Zuyev (yellow card) 74'	Report		Stadium: Otkritie Arena; Attendance: 28,052; Referee: Kirill Levnikov

8 August 2016 2	Spartak Moscow	1–0	Krylia Sovetov	Moscow
19:30 MSK (UTC+3)	Yeshchenko 70'; Fernando (yellow card) 71'	Report		Stadium: Otkritie Arena; Attendance: 17,449; Referee: Mikhail Vilkov

13 August 2016 3	Rubin Kazan	1–1	Spartak Moscow	Kazan
20:30 MSK (UTC+3)	Ozdoyev (yellow card) 21'; Dević 45'; Song (yellow card) 82'; Sánchez (yellow card) 90+1'	Report	Popov 21' (yellow card) 45'; Fernando (yellow card) 71'; Bocchetti (yellow card) 90'	Stadium: Central Stadium; Attendance: 17,339; Referee: Vitali Meshkov

21 August 2016 4	Spartak Moscow	2–0	Krasnodar	Moscow
18:00 MSK (UTC+3)	Luís 15', 74'; Fernando (yellow card) 66'; Kombarov (yellow card) 87'; Melgarejo (yellow card) 90+2'	Report	Smolov (yellow card) 71'	Stadium: Otkritie Arena; Attendance: 31,035; Referee: Vladislav Bezborodov

28 August 2016 5	Anzhi Makhachkala	0–2	Spartak Moscow	Kaspiysk
21:30 MSK (UTC+3)	Musalov (yellow card) 52'; Yambéré (yellow card) 57'; Lazić (yellow card) 62'; Mensah (yellow card) 85'	Report	Ananidze 18'; Yeshchenko (yellow card) 37' (yellow-red card) 72'; Kutepov (yellow card) 65'; Fernando (yellow card) 68'; Promes 81'	Stadium: Anzhi Arena; Attendance: 14,300; Referee: Sergei Ivanov

11 September 2016 6	Spartak Moscow	1–0	Lokomotiv Moscow	Moscow
16:30 MSK (UTC+3)	Popov 25'	Report	Maicon (yellow card) 79'	Stadium: Otkritie Arena; Attendance: 43,710; Referee: Aleksei Nikolaev

16 September 2016 7	Orenburg	1–3	Spartak Moscow	Orenburg
17:00 MSK (UTC+3)	Andreyev (yellow card) 39'; Prudnikov (yellow card) 39'; Georgiev 41' (pen.) (yellow card) 90+1'; Vorobyov (yellow card) 59'; Afonin (yellow card) 85'	Summary	Promes 2', 66'; Zé Luís (yellow card) 39'; Rômulo (yellow card) 39'; Ananidze 69'; Popov (yellow card) 89'; Kombarov (yellow card) 90+1'	Stadium: Gazovik Stadium; Attendance: 7,043; Referee: Vladimir Seldyakov

25 September 2016 8	Spartak Moscow	0–1	Ufa	Moscow
19:00 MSK (UTC+3)	Maurício (yellow card) 23'; Popov (yellow card) 87'	Report	Fatai 39'; Alikin (yellow card) 44'; Bezdenezhnykh (yellow card) 57'	Stadium: Otkritie Arena; Attendance: 26,117; Referee: Roman Galimov

2 October 2016 9	Zenit St.Petersburg	4–2	Spartak Moscow	Saint Petersburg
16:30 MSK (UTC+3)	Criscito 20' (pen.) (yellow card) 31'; Dzyuba 33' (yellow card) 34'; Witsel 61'; Giuliano 87' (pen.); Neto (yellow card) 90'	Report	Bocchetti 28' (yellow card) 54'; Zé Luís (yellow card) 31' (goal) 37'; Glushakov (yellow card) 49'; Yeshchenko (yellow card) 86'	Stadium: Petrovsky Stadium; Attendance: 18,684; Referee: Sergey Ivanov

15 October 2016 10	Spartak Moscow	1–0	Rostov	Moscow
19:30 MSK (UTC+3)	Fernando (yellow card) 30'; Glushakov 53'; Kombarov (yellow card) 66'	Report	Navas (yellow card) 30' (yellow-red card) 74'; Kudryashov (red card) 45+1'; Granat (yellow card) 86'; Yerokhin (yellow card) 90'	Stadium: Otkritie Arena; Attendance: 32,221; Referee: Vladislav Bezborodov

22 October 2016 11	Ural Yekaterinburg	0–1	Spartak Moscow	Yekaterinburg
17:00 MSK (UTC+3)	Kulakov (yellow card) 85'; Pavlyuchenko (yellow card) 87'	Report	Melgarejo 48'; Kutepov (yellow card) 72'	Stadium: SKB-Bank Arena; Attendance: 8,600; Referee: Alexander Yegorov

29 October 2016 12	Spartak Moscow	3–1	CSKA Moscow	Moscow
18:00 MSK (UTC+3)	Glushakov 19'; Zé Luís 76', 89'	Report	Strandberg 82'	Stadium: Otkritie Arena; Attendance: 44,884; Referee: Aleksei Nikolaev

5 November 2016 13	Tom Tomsk	0–1	Spartak Moscow	Tomsk
11:00 MSK (UTC+3)	Balyaikin (yellow card) 50'; Droppa (yellow card) 63'	Report	Fernando 42'; Popov (yellow card) 83'	Stadium: Trud Stadium; Attendance: 5,400; Referee: Alexander Yegorov

20 November 2016 14	Spartak Moscow	1–0	Amkar Perm	Moscow
17:00 MSK (UTC+3)	Maurício (yellow card) 69'; Glushakov 90+1'; Promes (yellow card) 90+4'	Report	Balanovich (yellow card) 67'; Idowu (yellow card) 76'; Komolov (yellow card) 76'; Dzhikiya (yellow card) 90+3'; Miljković (yellow card) 90+5'	Stadium: Otkritie Arena; Attendance: 27,446; Referee: Sergey Lapochkin

26 November 2016 15	Terek Grozny	0–1	Spartak Moscow	Grozny
18:00 MSK (UTC+3)	Roshi (yellow card) 68'; Balaj (yellow card) 86'	Report	Kutepov (yellow card) 10'; Maurício 27'	Stadium: Akhmat-Arena; Attendance: 15,232; Referee: Vitali Meshkov

1 December 2016 16	Krylia Sovetov	4–0	Spartak Moscow	Samara
18:00 MSK (UTC+3)	Mollo 17' (pen.); Tkachyov 45+2'; Pasquato 59'; Kornilenko 70'; Taranov (yellow card) 90+2'	Report	Maurício (yellow card) 38'; Fernando (yellow card) 90'	Stadium: Metallurg Stadium; Attendance: 7,370; Referee: Kirill Levnikov

5 December 2016 17	Spartak Moscow	2–1	Rubin Kazan	Moscow
19:30 MSK (UTC+3)	Promes 43' (yellow card) 45+1' (yellow-red card) 76'; Zobnin (yellow card) 69'; Glushakov 74'; Maurício (yellow card) 80'; Popov (yellow card) 81'	Report	Nabiullin (yellow card) 6' (yellow-red card) 71'; Jonathas 38' (yellow card) 74'; Caktaš (yellow card) 65'	Stadium: Otkritie Arena; Attendance: 20,512; Referee: Mikhail Vilkov

5 March 2017 18	Krasnodar	2–2	Spartak Moscow	Krasnodar
16:30 MSK (UTC+3)	Tasci 15' (o.g.); Smolov (yellow card) 63' (goal) 73' (pen.)	Report	Fernando 3'; Glushakov (yellow card) 45+2'; Adriano 54'; Zobnin (yellow card) 68'; Zé Luís (yellow card) 90+3'	Stadium: Krasnodar Stadium; Attendance: 31,250; Referee: Vladislav Bezborodov

12 March 2017 19	Spartak Moscow	1–0	Anzhi Makhachkala	Moscow
16:30 MSK (UTC+3)	Samedov 67'	Report	Phibel (yellow card) 3'; Yakovlev (yellow card) 28'; Khubulov (yellow card) 47'; Tetrashvili (yellow card) 57'	Stadium: Otkritie Arena; Attendance: 34,456; Referee: Alexander Yegorov

18 March 2017 20	Lokomotiv Moscow	1–1	Spartak Moscow	Moscow
16:30 MSK (UTC+3)	Ignatyev (yellow card) 34'; Ari 41' (yellow card) 84'; Fernandes (yellow card) 72'	Report	Fernando (yellow card) 29'; Promes 52'; Yeshchenko (yellow card) 79'	Stadium: Lokomotiv Stadium; Attendance: 27,402; Referee: Mikhail Vilkov

3 April 2017 21	Spartak Moscow	3–2	Orenburg	Moscow
17:00 MSK (UTC+3)	Zobnin 34', 58'; Samedov (yellow card) 39'; Promes 90+5'	Report	Popović 70'; Ďuriš 71'	Stadium: Otkritie Arena; Attendance: 25,694; Referee: Arten Chistyakov

9 April 2017 22	Ufa	1–3	Spartak Moscow	Ufa
14:00 MSK (UTC+3)	Vaněk (yellow card) 26'; Nikitin (yellow card) 55'; Oblyakov 85'; Stotsky (yellow card) 89'	Report	Glushakov 38'; Promes 56' (pen.); Melgarejo 90+1'	Stadium: Neftyanik Stadium; Attendance: 12,300; Referee: Sergey Lapochkin

16 April 2017 23	Spartak Moscow	2–1	Zenit St.Petersburg	Moscow
20:00 MSK (UTC+3)	Promes 21' (yellow card) 85'; Samedov 80'	Report	Dzyuba 66'	Stadium: Otkritie Arena; Attendance: 43,333; Referee: Alexander Yegorov

22 April 2017 24	Rostov	3–0	Spartak Moscow	Rostov-on-Don
16:30 MSK (UTC+3)	Bukharov 23', 50'; Bayramyan (yellow card) 43'; Gațcan 45+3'; Azmoun (yellow card) 80'	Report	Glushakov (red card) 75'	Stadium: Olimp-2; Attendance: 11,800; Referee: Mikhail Vilkov

25 April 2017 25	Spartak Moscow	1–0	Ural Yekaterinburg	Moscow
19:30 MSK (UTC+3)	Fernando 23'; Popov (yellow card) 51'	Report	Balažic (yellow card) 73'	Stadium: Otkritie Arena; Attendance: 30,823; Referee: Vladimir Seldyakov

30 April 2017 26	CSKA Moscow	1–2	Spartak Moscow	Moscow
17:00 MSK (UTC+3)	A.Berezutski 45'; Vasin (yellow card) 55'; Tošić (yellow card) 89'	Report	Adriano 32'; Dzhikiya (yellow card) 45+1'; Glushakov 51'; Yeshchenko (yellow card) 90+1'	Stadium: VEB Arena; Attendance: 27,352; Referee: Vladislav Bezborodov

6 May 2017 27	Spartak Moscow	1–0	Tom Tomsk	Moscow
19:00 MSK (UTC+3)	Promes 15' (pen.)	Report	Sobolev (yellow card) 29'; Gvineysky (yellow card) 30'; Miterev (yellow card) 33'	Stadium: Otkritie Arena; Attendance: 42070; Referee: Aleksey Sukhoy

13 May 2017 28	Amkar Perm	0–1	Spartak Moscow	Perm
14:30 MSK (UTC+3)	Zanev (yellow card) 76'	Report	Samedov 50'	Stadium: Zvezda Stadium; Attendance: 12,300; Referee: Sergey Lapochkin

17 May 2017 29	Spartak Moscow	3–0	Terek Grozny	Moscow
19:30 MSK (UTC+3)	Glushakov 15', 19'; Popov (yellow card) 23'; Promes 74' (yellow card) 74'	Report	Píriz (yellow card) 45+1'	Stadium: Otkritie Arena; Attendance: 43,602; Referee: Kirill Levnikov

21 May 2017 30	Arsenal Tula	3–0	Spartak Moscow	Tula
15:00 MSK (UTC+3)	Rasic 3', 63' (penalty missed) 35'; Maksimov 24'	Report	Dzhikiya (red card) 12'	Stadium: Arsenal Stadium; Attendance: 18,500; Referee: Alexander Yegorov

=== Russian Cup ===
21 September 2016 Round of 32	SKA-Khabarovsk	1–0	Spartak Moscow	Khabarovsk
12:00 MSK (UTC+3)	Cherevko (yellow card) 41'; Nikiforov 58'; Dedechko (yellow card) 90+1'; Kobyalko (yellow card) 90+1'; Dovbnya (yellow card) 90+4'	Report	Rômulo (yellow card) 45'; Fernando (yellow card) 54'	Stadium: Lenin Stadium; Attendance: 13,000; Referee: Artyom Chistyakov

=== UEFA Europa League ===
Having finished 5th in Russian Premier League in the previous season, the club qualified for UEFA Europe League 3rd qualifying stage.

==== Qualifying rounds ====
28 July 2016 Third qualifying round 1st leg	AEK Larnaca (Cyprus)	1–1	(Russia) Spartak Moscow	Larnaca, Cyprus
18:00 MSK (UTC+3)	Català (yellow card) 35'; Tomàs (yellow card) 64'; Alves 65'	Report	Zobnin (yellow card) 10'; Ananidze 38'; Kombarov (yellow card) 49'; Glushakov (yellow card) 90+1'	Stadium: Antonis Papadopoulos Stadium; Attendance: 4,323; Referee: Alejandro Hernández Hernández (Spain)
Note: Match played at the Antonis Papadopoulos Stadium in Larnaca, instead of AEK Larnaca's regular GSZ Stadium in Larnaca.

4 August 2016 Third qualifying round 2nd leg	Spartak Moscow (Russia)	0–1 (1–2 agg.)	(Cyprus) AEK Larnaca	Moscow, Russia
19:30 MSK (UTC+3)	Makeyev (yellow card) 77'; Rebrov (yellow card) 82'	Report	Murillo (yellow card) 78'; Trichkovski 89'	Stadium: Otkritie Arena; Attendance: 24,017; Referee: Alexander Harkam (Austria)

== Squad statistics ==
As of match played 21 May 2017

=== Appearances and goals ===
No.	Pos	Nat	Player	Total		Premier League		Russian Cup		UEFA Europa League	
No.	Pos	Nat	Player	Apps	Goals	Apps	Goals	Apps	Goals	Apps	Goals
1	GK	(Russia) RUS	Sergei Pesyakov	2	0	1	0	1	0	0	0
7	MF	(Georgia (country)) GEO	Jano Ananidze	24	5	14+8	4	0	0	2	1
8	MF	(Russia) RUS	Denis Glushakov	27	8	24+1	8	0	0	1+1	0
9	FW	(Cape Verde) CPV	Zé Luís	24	5	17+4	5	0+1	0	2	0
10	FW	(Netherlands) NED	Quincy Promes	30	13	26+1	13	0+1	0	2	0
11	MF	(Brazil) BRA	Fernando	30	3	27+1	3	1	0	1	0
12	FW	(Brazil) BRA	Luiz Adriano	8	2	6+2	2	0	0	0	0
14	DF	(Russia) RUS	Georgi Dzhikiya	8	0	8	0	0	0	0	0
16	DF	(Italy) ITA	Salvatore Bocchetti	17	1	14+1	1	0	0	2	0
17	DF	(Russia) RUS	Georgi Tigiyev	4	0	3+1	0	0	0	0	0
18	DF	(Russia) RUS	Ilya Kutepov	26	0	24	0	0	0	2	0
19	MF	(Russia) RUS	Aleksandr Samedov	10	3	7+3	3	0	0	0	0
21	GK	(Russia) RUS	Aleksandr Selikhov	1	0	1	0	0	0	0	0
23	DF	(Russia) RUS	Dmitri Kombarov	30	0	27	0	1	0	2	0
25	MF	(Paraguay) PAR	Lorenzo Melgarejo	22	2	7+14	2	0	0	0+1	0
32	GK	(Russia) RUS	Artyom Rebrov	30	0	28	0	0	0	2	0
33	DF	(Brazil) BRA	Maurício	11	1	9+1	1	1	0	0	0
34	DF	(Russia) RUS	Yevgeni Makeyev	3	0	1+1	0	0	0	1	0
35	DF	(Germany) GER	Serdar Tasci	19	0	17+1	0	1	0	0	0
37	MF	(Russia) RUS	Georgi Melkadze	2	0	0	0	1	0	0+1	0
38	DF	(Russia) RUS	Andrey Yeshchenko	27	1	21+4	1	0	0	2	0
40	MF	(Russia) RUS	Artyom Timofeyev	5	0	0+5	0	0	0	0	0
47	MF	(Russia) RUS	Roman Zobnin	32	2	29	2	0+1	0	2	0
52	MF	(Russia) RUS	Igor Leontyev	1	0	1	0	0	0	0	0
64	DF	(Russia) RUS	Denis Kutin	3	0	0+2	0	1	0	0	0
69	FW	(Russia) RUS	Denis Davydov	5	0	1+3	0	1	0	0	0
71	MF	(Bulgaria) BUL	Ivelin Popov	24	2	17+5	2	1	0	1	0
Players away from the club on loan:
17	MF	(Russia) RUS	Aleksandr Zuyev	8	0	1+5	0	1	0	0+1	0
Players who left Spartak Moscow during the season:
5	MF	(Brazil) BRA	Rômulo	10	0	3+5	0	1	0	0+1	0
45	DF	(Russia) RUS	Aleksandr Putsko	1	0	0+1	0	0	0	0	0

=== Goal scorers ===
Place	Position	Nation	Number	Name	Premier League	Russian Cup	UEFA Europa League	Total
1	FW	(Netherlands)	10	Quincy Promes	13	0	0	13
2	MF	(Russia)	8	Denis Glushakov	8	0	0	8
3	FW	(Cape Verde)	9	Zé Luís	5	0	0	5
3	MF	(Georgia (country))	7	Jano Ananidze	4	0	1	5
5	MF	(Brazil)	11	Fernando	3	0	0	3
5	MF	(Russia)	19	Aleksandr Samedov	3	0	0	3
7	MF	(Bulgaria)	71	Ivelin Popov	2	0	0	2
7	MF	(Russia)	47	Roman Zobnin	2	0	0	2
7	MF	(Paraguay)	25	Lorenzo Melgarejo	2	0	0	2
7	FW	(Brazil)	12	Luiz Adriano	2	0	0	2
11	DF	(Russia)	38	Andrey Yeshchenko	1	0	0	1
11	DF	(Italy)	16	Salvatore Bocchetti	1	0	0	1
11	DF	(Brazil)	33	Maurício	1	0	0	1
				TOTALS	47	0	1	48

=== Clean sheets ===
Place	Position	Nation	Number	Name	Premier League	Russian Cup	UEFA Europa League	Total
1	GK	(Russia)	32	Artyom Rebrov	14	0	0	14
2	GK	(Russia)	21	Aleksandr Selikhov	1	0	0	1
				TOTALS	15	0	0	15

=== Disciplinary record ===
Number	Nation	Position	Name	Premier League		Russian Cup		UEFA Europa League		Total	
Number	Nation	Position	Name	Yellow card	Red card	Yellow card	Red card	Yellow card	Red card	Yellow card	Red card
8	(Russia)	MF	Denis Glushakov	2	1	0	0	1	0	3	1
9	(Cape Verde)	FW	Zé Luís	3	0	0	0	0	0	3	0
10	(Netherlands)	FW	Quincy Promes	5	1	0	0	0	0	5	1
11	(Brazil)	MF	Fernando	7	0	1	0	0	0	8	0
14	(Russia)	DF	Georgi Dzhikiya	1	1	0	0	0	0	1	1
16	(Italy)	DF	Salvatore Bocchetti	2	0	0	0	0	0	2	0
18	(Russia)	DF	Ilya Kutepov	3	0	0	0	0	0	3	0
19	(Russia)	MF	Aleksandr Samedov	1	0	0	0	0	0	1	0
23	(Russia)	DF	Dmitri Kombarov	3	0	0	0	1	0	4	0
25	(Paraguay)	DF	Lorenzo Melgarejo	1	0	0	0	0	0	1	0
32	(Russia)	GK	Artyom Rebrov	0	0	0	0	1	0	1	0
33	(Brazil)	DF	Maurício	4	0	0	0	0	0	4	0
34	(Russia)	DF	Yevgeni Makeyev	0	0	0	0	1	0	1	0
38	(Russia)	DF	Andrey Yeshchenko	5	1	0	0	0	0	5	1
47	(Russia)	MF	Roman Zobnin	2	0	0	0	1	0	3	0
71	(Bulgaria)	MF	Ivelin Popov	7	0	0	0	0	0	7	0
Players away on loan:
17	(Russia)	MF	Aleksandr Zuyev	1	0	0	0	0	0	1	0
Players who left Spartak Moscow season during the season:
5	(Brazil)	MF	Rômulo	1	0	1	0	0	0	2	0
			TOTALS	48	4	2	0	5	0	55	4
