= 2024–25 FC Chernomorets Novorossiysk season =

FC Chernomorets Novorossiysk
2024–25 season
- Manager: Vadim Garanin
- Stadium: Central Stadium
- Russian First League: 15th
- Russian Cup: Pre-season

The 2024–25 season is the 118th season in the history of FC Chernomorets Novorossiysk, and the club's second consecutive season in the Russian First League. In addition to the domestic league, the team is scheduled to participate in the Russian Cup.

== Friendlies ==
=== Pre-season ===
28 June 2024 Friendly	Železničar Pančevo (Serbia)	3–1	(Russia) Chernomorets Novorossiysk

29 June 2024 Friendly	FK IMT (Serbia)	2–3	(Russia) Chernomorets Novorossiysk

6 July 2024 Friendly	KAMAZ Naberezhnye Chelny (Russia)	0–1	(Russia) Chernomorets Novorossiysk
17:00 UTC+3

6 July 2024 Friendly	KAMAZ Naberezhnye Chelny (Russia)	1–0	(Russia) Chernomorets Novorossiysk
19:00 UTC+3

== Competitions ==
=== Overall record ===
Competition	First match	Last match	Starting round	Record							
Competition	First match	Last match	Starting round	Pld	W	D	L	GF	GA	GD	Win %
Russian First League	13 July 2024		Matchday 1	4	1	0	3	4	7	−3	25.00
Russian Cup				0	0	0	0	0	0	+0	—
Total				4	1	0	3	4	7	−3	25.00

Last updated: 2 August 2024
Source: Soccerway

=== Russian First League ===
==== League table ====
Pos	Team	Pld	W	D	L	GF	GA	GD	Pts	Promotion, qualification or relegation
1	Baltika Kaliningrad (C, P)	34	19	12	3	50	18	+32	69	Promotion to Premier League
2	Torpedo Moscow (Note: The owner and the general director of Torpedo were arrested on 19 June 2025 and later charged with attempting to bribe a referee during the 2024–25 season. Russian Football Union conducted their own investigation. On 10 July 2025, Torpedo was excluded from the RPL for the 2025–26 season, cancelling their promotion. They remained in the Russian First League.)	34	17	14	3	51	25	+26	65	
3	Chernomorets Novorossiysk (Note: Chernomorets was not issued the 2025–26 RPL license and was replaced in the play-offs by Sochi.)	34	19	7	8	51	34	+17	64	
4	Ural Yekaterinburg	34	16	11	7	50	38	+12	59	Qualification to Premier League play-offs
5	Sochi (O, P)	34	16	9	9	55	34	+21	57	Qualification to Premier League play-offs

Source: Soccerway
Rules for classification: 1) Points; 2) Head-to-head points; 3) Head-to-head matches won; 4) Head-to-head goal difference; 5) Head-to-head goals scored; 6) Head-to-head away goals scored; 7) Matches won; 8) Goal difference; 9) Goals scored; 10) Away matches won; 11) Away goals scored; 12) Best disciplinary record (3 points for red card, 1 point for yellow card); 13) Drawing lots. If teams tied on points did not play an equal number of head-to-head games, head-to-head criteria and disciplinary record are not used for positioning. If 1st- and 2nd-placed teams are tied in the final standings on the first 12 criteria, a winner is determined in an additional play-off game, with no extra time and a penalty-shootout if tied at the end of regulation, instead of drawing lots.
(C) Champions; (O) Play-off winners; (P) Promoted

==== Results summary ====
Overall								Home						Away					
Pld	W	D	L	GF	GA	GD	Pts	W	D	L	GF	GA	GD	W	D	L	GF	GA	GD
4	1	0	3	4	7	−3	3	1	0	1	4	4	0	0	0	2	0	3	−3

Last updated: 2 August 2024.

==== Results by round ====
Round	1	2	3	4
Ground	A	H	H	A
Result	L	L	W	L
Position	14	14		

Updated to match(es) played on 2 August 2024. Source:
A = Away; H = Home; W = Win; D = Draw; L = Loss

==== Matches ====
The tentative match schedule was released on 27 June.

13 July 2024 1	Arsenal Tula	1–0	Chernomorets Novorossiysk	Tula
16:00 UTC+3	Lipovoy 52'			Stadium: Arsenal Stadium; Attendance: 3,616; Referee: Sergey Kulikov

21 July 2024 2	Chernomorets Novorossiysk	1–2	Chayka Peschanokopskoye	Novorossiysk
19:30 UTC+3	Khabalov 82'		Rudenko 63'; Khokhlachyov 90+1'	Stadium: Central Stadium; Attendance: 6,158; Referee: Stanislav Matveev

27 July 2024 3	Chernomorets Novorossiysk	3–2	Ural Yekaterinburg	Novorossiysk
19:30 UTC+3	Goglichidze 30' (o.g.); Rodionov 45'; Uridia 45+2'		Ishkov 9'; Ítalo 52'	Stadium: Central Stadium; Attendance: 7,019; Referee: Sergey Kulikov

2 August 2024 4	Baltika Kaliningrad	2–0	Chernomorets Novorossiysk	Kaliningrad
20:00 UTC+3	Alex Fernandes 13' (pen.), 39'			Stadium: Kaliningrad Stadium

10 August 2024 5	Sochi	2–1	Chernomorets Novorossiysk	Sochi
20:00	Guarirapa 5' (yellow card) 75'; Bart 8'; Litvinov (yellow card) 53'; Kramarič (yellow card) 65'; Marcelo Alves (yellow card) 86'	Report	Uridia (yellow card) 4'; Stezhko (yellow card) 23'; Okladnikov 37'; Khabalov (yellow card) 39'	Stadium: Fisht Olympic Stadium; Attendance: 5,816; Referee: (Russia) Ivan Sidenkov

18 August 2024 6	Chernomorets Novorossiysk	2–1	Tyumen	Novorossiysk
20:30	Uridia 20'; Yenin (yellow card) 58'; Antonov 79'; Lanin (yellow card) 90+5'	Report	Shavlokhov (yellow card) 13'; Olivier Kenfack 87' (yellow card) 90+5'; Voropayev (yellow card) 90+5'	Stadium: Central Stadium; Attendance: 5,312; Referee: (Russia) Vladislav Tselovalnikov

25 August 2024 7	Torpedo Moscow	1–1	Chernomorets Novorossiysk	Khimki
18:00	Chupayov 56'; Gorbunov (yellow card) 80'	Report	Fomin (yellow card) 35'; Ivanov 59'	Stadium: Arena Khimki; Attendance: 1,051; Referee: (Russia) Inal Tanashev

1 September 2024 8	Chernomorets Novorossiysk	2–2	Rodina Moscow	Novorossiysk
19:00	Stezhko (yellow card) 2'; Ilya Rodionov (yellow card) 33'; Križan 35' (o.g.); Chichinadze 67'; Krasilnichenko (yellow card) 78'; Antonov (yellow card) 90'	Report	Fishchenko (yellow card) 9'; Stezhko 34' (o.g.); Yushin 62'; Gordyushenko (yellow card) 79'	Stadium: Central Stadium; Attendance: 6,472; Referee: (Russia) Anton Anopa

7 September 2024 9	KAMAZ	0–1	Chernomorets Novorossiysk	Naberezhnye Chelny
18:30		Report	Krasilnichenko (yellow card) 27'; Cherov 39'; Krotov (yellow card) 78'	Stadium: KAMAZ Stadium; Attendance: 2,685; Referee: (Russia) Igor Panin

14 September 2024 10	Chernomorets Novorossiysk	2–1	Yenisey Krasnoyarsk	Novorossiysk
19:00	Shiryayev 31' (o.g.); Ivanov 73'	Report	Savelyev 9'; Chukanov (yellow card) 45'; Maslovsky (yellow card) 63'	Stadium: Central Stadium; Attendance: 5,172; Referee: (Russia) Kirill Silantyev

20 September 2024 11	Rotor Volgograd	1–2	Chernomorets Novorossiysk	Volgograd
20:30	Semyonov 45+3'; Nikita Plotnikov (yellow card) 60'	Report	Stezhko 38'; Krotov (yellow card) 57'; Uridia 82'; Frolkin (yellow card) 90+5'	Stadium: Volgograd Arena; Attendance: 18,463; Referee: (Russia) Igor Zakharov

29 September 2024	Chernomorets Novorossiysk	–	Sokol Saratov	Novorossiysk
				Stadium: Central Stadium

6 October 2024	Alania Vladikavkaz	–	Chernomorets Novorossiysk	Grozny
				Stadium: Sultan Bilimkhanov Stadium

12 October 2024	Ufa	–	Chernomorets Novorossiysk	Ufa
				Stadium: Neftyanik Stadium

19 October 2024	Chernomorets Novorossiysk	–	Neftekhimik Nizhnekamsk	Novorossiysk
				Stadium: Central Stadium

26 October 2024	SKA-Khabarovsk	–	Chernomorets Novorossiysk	Khabarovsk
				Stadium: Lenin Stadium

3 November 2024	Chernomorets Novorossiysk	–	Shinnik Yaroslavl	Novorossiysk
				Stadium: Central Stadium

10 November 2024	Tyumen	–	Chernomorets Novorossiysk	Tyumen
				Stadium: Geolog Stadium

17 November 2024	Rodina Moscow	–	Chernomorets Novorossiysk	Moscow
				Stadium: Sapsan Arena

24 November 2024	Chernomorets Novorossiysk	–	KAMAZ	Novorossiysk
				Stadium: Central Stadium

30 November 2024	Chernomorets Novorossiysk	–	Ufa	Novorossiysk
				Stadium: Central Stadium

=== Russian Cup ===
24 September 2024 Round 4	Amkar Perm	3-3 (4-3 p)	Chernomorets Novorossiysk	Perm
18:00	Daniil Promoshkin 2'; Stepanov (yellow card) 19'; Dibirgadzhiyev 24' 36'; Aleks Radzhabov (red card) 65'; Kirill Burykin (yellow card) 74'; Khamkhoyev (yellow card) 88'	Report	Ilya Rodionov 17'; Fomin (yellow card) 48' (goal) 88'; Ivanov (yellow card) 74'; Bocharov 86' (o.g.)	Stadium: Zvezda Stadium; Attendance: 2,500; Referee: (Russia) Aleksandr Mayun
