= Albert Lukmanov =

Russian footballer and coach

Personal information
- Full name: Albert Minnigareyevich Lukmanov
- Date of birth: 15 December 1974 (age 51)
- Place of birth: Ufa, Russian SFSR
- Height: 1.83 m (6 ft 0 in)
- Positions: Defender; midfielder

Team information
- Current team: FC Dynamo Vladivostok (assistant manager)

Youth career
- SK Gastello Ufa

Senior career*
Years	Team	Apps	(Gls)
1992–1995	FC Agidel Ufa	81	(6)
1997–2001	FC Sodovik Sterlitamak	144	(10)
2002–2005	FC Neftyanik Ufa	125	(13)
2006	FC Zenit Chelyabinsk	21	(2)
2008	FC Taksist Ufa		
2009	FC Bashinformsvyaz-Dynamo Ufa	23	(1)

Managerial career
- 2015: FC Ufa-M
- 2016–2018: FC Ufa (U21)
- 2018–2020: FC Ufa-2
- 2020–2022: FC Ufa (U19)
- 2022–2023: FC Veles Moscow (assistant)
- 2023: FC Ufa (assistant)
- 2024–: FC Dynamo Vladivostok (assistant)
- * Club domestic league appearances and goals

Albert Minnigareyevich Lukmanov (Russian: Альберт Миннигареевич Лукманов; born 15 December 1974) is a Russian professional football coach and a former player. He is an assistant coach with FC Dynamo Vladivostok.

== Club career ==
He played in the Russian Football National League for FC Gastello Ufa in 1992.
