= Vasili Cherov =

Russian football player

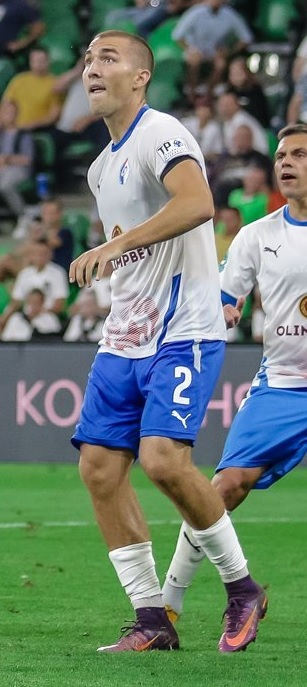
- Cherov with Fakel Voronezh in 2022

Personal information
- Full name: Vasili Sergeyevich Cherov
- Date of birth: 13 January 1996 (age 30)
- Place of birth: Slavyansk-na-Kubani, Russia
- Height: 1.85 m (6 ft 1 in)
- Position: Centre-back

Team information
- Current team: Ufa
- Number: 2

Youth career
- DYuSSh Olimp Slavyansk-na-Kubani
- 2013–2016: Krasnodar

Senior career*
Years	Team	Apps	(Gls)
2014–2017	Krasnodar-2	63	(1)
2016	→ Khimki (loan)	3	(0)
2018	Afips Afipsky	14	(1)
2018–2019	Druzhba Maykop	17	(0)
2019	Chernomorets Novorossiysk	13	(1)
2020	Kuban Krasnodar	14	(1)
2021–2024	Fakel Voronezh	96	(3)
2024–2025	Chernomorets Novorossiysk	20	(2)
2025–2026	Fakel Voronezh	14	(0)
2026–	Ufa	0	(0)

International career^{‡}
2014	Russia U-18	5	(1)
2015	Russia U-19	1	(0)
2015–2016	Russia U-21	3	(0)
- * Club domestic league appearances and goals as of 16 May 2026 ‡ National team caps and goals as of 14 November 2016

Vasili Sergeyevich Cherov (Russian: Василий Сергеевич Черов; born 13 January 1996) is a Russian football player who plays as a centre back for Ufa.

== Club career ==
He made his professional debut in the Russian Professional Football League for Krasnodar-2 on 15 April 2014 in a game against Vityaz Krymsk.

He made his Russian Football National League debut for Khimki on 23 July 2016 in a game against SKA-Khabarovsk.

Cherov made his Russian Premier League debut for Fakel Voronezh on 17 July 2022 against Krasnodar.

On 29 August 2024, Cherov returned to Chernomorets Novorossiysk.

== International ==
He represented Russia national under-19 football team at the 2015 UEFA European Under-19 Championship, where Russia came in second place.

== Career statistics ==
As of match played 16 May 2026

Club	Season	League			Cup		Other		Total	
Club	Season	Division	Apps	Goals	Apps	Goals	Apps	Goals	Apps	Goals
Krasnodar-2	2013–14	Russian Second League	10	0	–		–		10	0
Krasnodar-2	2014–15	Russian Second League	12	0	–		–		12	0
Krasnodar-2	2015–16	Russian Second League	23	0	–		4 (Note: Appearances in FNL Cup)	0	27	0
Krasnodar-2	2016–17	Russian Second League	17	1	–		4	0	21	1
Krasnodar-2	2017–18	Russian Second League	1	0	–		–		1	0
Krasnodar-2	Total		63	1	0	0	8	0	71	1
Khimki (loan)	2016–17	Russian First League	3	0	–		–		3	0
Afips Afipsky	2017–18	Russian Second League	14	1	–		–		14	1
Druzhba Maykop	2018–19	Russian Second League	17	0	–		–		17	0
Chernomorets Novorossiysk	2019–20	Russian Second League	13	1	2	0	–		15	1
Kuban Krasnodar	2019–20	Russian Second League	1	0	–		–		1	0
Kuban Krasnodar	2020–21	Russian Second League	13	1	2	0	–		15	1
Kuban Krasnodar	Total		14	1	2	0	0	0	16	1
Fakel Voronezh	2020–21	Russian First League	9	0	–		–		9	0
Fakel Voronezh	2021–22	Russian First League	37	2	2	0	–		39	2
Fakel Voronezh	2022–23	Russian Premier League	25	0	3	0	1 (Note: Appearance in relegation play-offs)	0	29	0
Fakel Voronezh	2023–24	Russian Premier League	24	1	4	1	–		28	2
Fakel Voronezh	2024–25	Russian Premier League	1	0	3	0	—		4	0
Fakel Voronezh	Total		96	3	12	1	1	0	109	4
Chernomorets Novorossiysk	2024–25	Russian First League	14	2	1	0	–		15	2
Chernomorets Novorossiysk	2025–26	Russian First League	6	0	0	0	–		6	0
Chernomorets Novorossiysk	Total		20	2	1	0	0	0	21	2
Fakel Voronezh	2025–26	Russian First League	14	0	0	0	–		14	0
Career total			220	7	16	1	9	0	245	8
