= Artyom Poplevchenkov =

Russian footballer

Personal information
- Full name: Artyom Aleksandrovich Poplevchenkov
- Date of birth: 9 June 2000 (age 26)
- Place of birth: Moscow, Russia
- Height: 1.97 m (6 ft 5 1/2 in)
- Position: Goalkeeper

Youth career
- –2013: Moskvich Moscow
- 2013–2020: FC Spartak Moscow

Senior career*
Years	Team	Apps	(Gls)
2018–2021	FC Spartak-2 Moscow	8	(0)
2018–2021	FC Spartak Moscow	0	(0)
2022	FC Kuban Krasnodar	0	(0)
2022–2023	FC Balashikha	6	(0)
2023	FC Rubin Yalta		
2023	PFC Dynamo Stavropol	7	(0)

International career^{‡}
2016	Russia U-16	1	(0)
- * Club domestic league appearances and goals as of 25 November 2023 ‡ National team caps and goals as of 30 April 2016

Artyom Aleksandrovich Poplevchenkov (Russian: Артём Александрович Поплевченков; born 9 June 2000) is a Russian football player.

== Club career ==
He made his debut in the Russian Football National League for FC Spartak-2 Moscow on 8 August 2020 in a game against FC Torpedo Moscow.
