= FC Ufa-2 =

- Full name: Football Club Ufa-2
- Founded: 2011
- Manager: Albert Lukmanov
- 2019–20: Russian Professional Football League, Zone Ural-Privolzhye, 12th

FC Ufa-2 (Russian: «Уфа-2» (Уфа)) is a Russian football team from Ufa. It is the farm-club for FC Ufa.

== History ==
The club participated in the amateur competitions since its establishment in 2011, including Russian Amateur Football League. For the 2018–19 season, it was licensed for the third-tier Russian Professional Football League. It left PFL after the 2019–20 season.
