= Dmitri Malikov (footballer) =

Russian footballer

Personal information
- Full name: Dmitri Anatolyevich Malikov
- Date of birth: 14 February 1997 (age 29)
- Place of birth: Usman, Russia
- Height: 1.74 m (5 ft 8 1/2 in)
- Positions: Midfielder; forward

Youth career
- FC Saturn Usman
- –2017: FC Spartak Moscow

Senior career*
Years	Team	Apps	(Gls)
2017	FC Olimpiyets Nizhny Novgorod	5	(0)
2017	FC Znamya Truda Orekhovo-Zuyevo	8	(0)
2018	FC Torpedo Vladimir	6	(0)
2018–2019	FC Fakel Voronezh	1	(0)
2019	FC Rodina Moscow	3	(0)
2020	FC Khimik-Arsenal	0	(0)

International career
2012	Russia U-15	2	(0)
2012–2013	Russia U-16	14	(12)
2013–2014	Russia U-17	5	(0)
2014–2015	Russia U-18	6	(0)
- * Club domestic league appearances and goals

Dmitri Anatolyevich Malikov (Russian: Дмитрий Анатольевич Маликов; born 14 February 1997) is a Russian former football player.

== Club career ==
He made his debut in the Russian Professional Football League for FC Olimpiyets Nizhny Novgorod on 24 April 2017 in a game against FC Chelyabinsk.

He made his Russian Football National League debut for FC Fakel Voronezh on 10 November 2018 in a game against FC Spartak-2 Moscow.
