= Rostislav Vorobyov =

Russian footballer

Personal information
- Full name: Rostislav Aleksandrovich Vorobyov
- Date of birth: 21 March 1998 (age 28)
- Place of birth: Krasnoyarsk, Russia
- Height: 1.75 m (5 ft 9 in)
- Position: Defender

Youth career
- 2005–2017: FC Yenisey Krasnoyarsk

Senior career*
Years	Team	Apps	(Gls)
2018–2020	FC Yenisey Krasnoyarsk	5	(0)
2020–2021	FC Yessentuki	15	(0)
2021–2022	FC Yenisey-2 Krasnoyarsk	35	(0)
- * Club domestic league appearances and goals as of 4 September 2022

Rostislav Aleksandrovich Vorobyov (Russian: Ростислав Александрович Воробьёв; born 21 March 1998) is a Russian football player.

== Club career ==
He made his debut in the Russian Football National League for FC Yenisey Krasnoyarsk on 20 July 2019 in a game against FC Rotor Volgograd.
