= Timur Sakharov =

Russian footballer

Personal information
- Full name: Timur Zinurovich Sakharov
- Date of birth: 19 July 1998 (age 28)
- Place of birth: Krasnoyarsk, Russia
- Height: 1.82 m (6 ft 0 in)
- Position: Midfielder

Youth career
- FC Yenisey Krasnoyarsk

Senior career*
Years	Team	Apps	(Gls)
2017	FC Yenisey Krasnoyarsk	1	(0)
2018	FC Kafa Feodosia		
2018–2019	FC Yenisey Krasnoyarsk	0	(0)
2019–2020	FC Nosta Novotroitsk	12	(0)
2020–2022	FC Yenisey Krasnoyarsk	8	(0)
2021–2023	FC Yenisey-2 Krasnoyarsk	29	(0)
2023–2025	FC Nosta Novotroitsk	38	(0)
- * Club domestic league appearances and goals as of 19 October 2025

Timur Zinurovich Sakharov (Russian: Тимур Зинурович Сахаров; born 19 July 1998) is a Russian football player.

== Club career ==
He made his debut in the Russian Football National League for FC Yenisey Krasnoyarsk on 5 August 2017 in a game against FC Spartak-2 Moscow.
