= Daniil Frolkin =

Russian footballer

Personal information
- Full name: Daniil Olegovich Frolkin
- Date of birth: 15 May 2001 (age 25)
- Place of birth: Rostov-on-Don, Russia
- Height: 1.89 m (6 ft 2 in)
- Position: Goalkeeper

Team information
- Current team: Fakel Voronezh
- Number: 1

Youth career
- –2015: Viktor Ponedelnik Academy
- 2015–2021: Rostov

Senior career*
| Years | Team | Apps | (Gls) |
| 2019–2021 | Rostov | 0 | (0) |
| 2021–2025 | Chernomorets Novorossiysk | 89 | (0) |
| 2025– | Fakel Voronezh | 31 | (0) |
- * Club domestic league appearances and goals as of 21 November 2026

Daniil Olegovich Frolkin (Russian: Даниил Олегович Фролкин; born 15 May 2001) is a Russian football player who plays as a goalkeeper for Fakel Voronezh.

== Career ==
Frolkin was raised in the youth system of Rostov and made several bench appearances for its senior team in the 2019–20 and 2020–21 seasons, but did not make his senior debut with the club.

Frolkin joined Fakel Voronezh in the summer of 2025. For most of their 2025–26 Russian First League campaign, he was the first-choice goalkeeper and contributed to their return to the Russian Premier League after one season in the second tier. Frolkin made his debut in the Russian Premier League for Fakel on 25 July 2026 in a game against Dynamo Makhachkala.

== Career statistics ==
As of 21 November 2026

| Club | Season | League | | | Cup | | Continental | | Total | |
| Club | Season | Division | Apps | Goals | Apps | Goals | Apps | Goals | Apps | Goals |
|---|---|---|---|---|---|---|---|---|---|---|
| Rostov | 2019–20 | Russian Premier League | 0 | 0 | 0 | 0 | — | | 0 | 0 |
| Rostov | 2020–21 | Russian Premier League | 0 | 0 | 0 | 0 | 0 | 0 | 0 | 0 |
| Rostov | Total | | 0 | 0 | 0 | 0 | 0 | 0 | 0 | 0 |
| Chernomorets Novorossiysk | 2021–22 | Russian Second League | 5 | 0 | 0 | 0 | — | | 5 | 0 |
| Chernomorets Novorossiysk | 2022–23 | Russian Second League | 30 | 0 | 3 | 0 | — | | 33 | 0 |
| Chernomorets Novorossiysk | 2023–24 | Russian First League | 34 | 0 | 0 | 0 | — | | 34 | 0 |
| Chernomorets Novorossiysk | 2024–25 | Russian First League | 20 | 0 | 0 | 0 | — | | 20 | 0 |
| Chernomorets Novorossiysk | Total | | 89 | 0 | 3 | 0 | 0 | 0 | 92 | 0 |
| Fakel Voronezh | 2025–26 | Russian First League | 21 | 0 | 2 | 0 | — | | 23 | 0 |
| Fakel Voronezh | 2026–27 | Russian Premier League | 10 | 0 | 1 | 0 | — | | 11 | 0 |
| Fakel Voronezh | Total | | 31 | 0 | 3 | 0 | 0 | 0 | 34 | 0 |
| Career total | | | 120 | 0 | 6 | 0 | 0 | 0 | 126 | 0 |
