= Idrisa Sambú =

Portuguese-Bissau-Guinean footballer

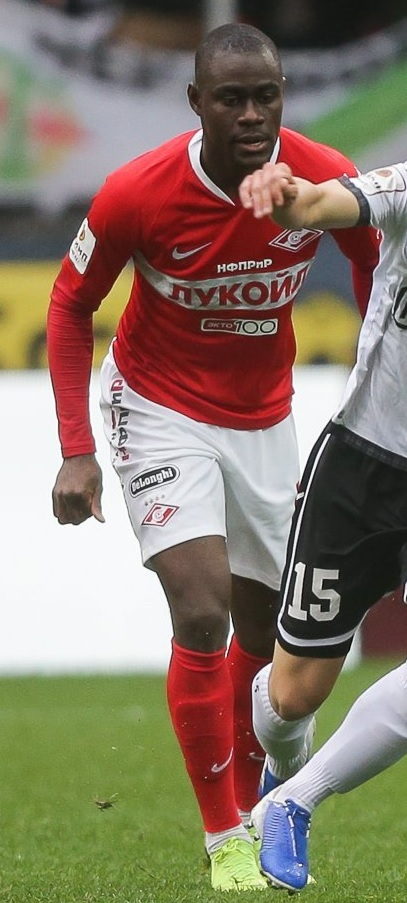
- Sambú with Spartak-2 Moscow in 2019

Personal information
- Full name: Idrisa Sidi Sambú
- Date of birth: 27 March 1998 (age 28)
- Place of birth: Bissau, Guinea-Bissau
- Height: 1.85 m (6 ft 1 in)
- Position: Forward

Youth career
- 2010–2013: Sporting
- 2013–2017: Porto

Senior career*
Years	Team	Apps	(Gls)
2016–2017	Porto B	1	(0)
2017–2020	Spartak-2 Moscow	43	(4)
2018–2019	→ Mouscron (loan)	7	(1)
2020–2021	Gaz Metan Mediaș	11	(1)
2022–2023	Vilafranquense	0	(0)
2023	→ Felgueiras 1932 (loan)	4	(0)
2023	AVS	0	(0)
2023–2024	1º Dezembro	13	(1)

International career
2013	Portugal U15	2	(1)
2013	Portugal U16	3	(2)
2013–2015	Portugal U17	13	(2)
2015–2016	Portugal U18	5	(1)
- * Club domestic league appearances and goals as of 1 July 2024

Idrisa Sidi Sambú (born 27 March 1998) is a professional footballer who plays as a forward. Born in Guinea-Bissau, he represented Portugal at youth level.

== Club career ==
=== Porto ===
On 2 April 2015, Sambú made his professional debut with Porto B in a 2015–16 Segunda Liga match against Académico Viseu.

=== Spartak Moscow ===
On 23 February 2017, Sambú signed with Russian Premier League club FC Spartak Moscow. He left Spartak upon the expiration of his contract on 1 June 2020.

==== Loan to Mouscron ====
On 29 June 2018, Sambú joined Mouscron on loan for the 2018–19 season.

=== Gaz Metan Medias ===
On 28 August 2020, Sambú signed with Romanian club Gaz Metan Mediaș.

=== Vilafranquense ===
On 17 July 2022, Sambú returned to Portugal, signing for Liga Portugal 2 club Vilafranquense.

In January 2023, Sambú was sent on loan until the end of the season to Liga 3 club Felgueiras.

After returning from loan to Vilafranquense, meanwhile rebranded as AVS Futebol SAD, Sambú had his contract terminated by mutual agreement, on 29 August.

=== 1º Dezembro ===
On 7 September 2023, Sambú signed a one-year contract with Liga 3 side 1º Dezembro.
