= Yegor Nikulin =

Russian footballer

Personal information
- Full name: Yegor Yuryevich Nikulin
- Date of birth: 16 January 1997 (age 29)
- Place of birth: Chelyabinsk, Russia
- Height: 1.80 m (5 ft 11 in)
- Position: Forward

Youth career
- 2016–2018: FC Spartak Moscow

Senior career*
Years	Team	Apps	(Gls)
2014–2015	FC Chertanovo Moscow	5	(0)
2015–2016	U.D. Leiria	2	(0)
2017–2018	FC Spartak-2 Moscow	3	(0)
2018–2019	FC Shinnik Yaroslavl	4	(0)
2019	→ FC Chertanovo Moscow (loan)	8	(0)
2019	→ FC Chertanovo-2 Moscow (loan)	4	(0)

International career
2012	Russia U15	5	(0)
2012	Russia U16	3	(0)
2013	Russia U17	6	(1)
- * Club domestic league appearances and goals

Yegor Yuryevich Nikulin (Russian: Егор Юрьевич Никулин; born 16 January 1997) is a Russian former football player.

== Club career ==
He made his professional debut in the Russian Professional Football League for FC Chertanovo Moscow on 28 August 2014 in a game against FC Kaluga.

He made his Russian Football National League debut for FC Spartak-2 Moscow on 22 July 2017 in a game against FC Tambov.

On 24 June 2018, he signed with FC Shinnik Yaroslavl.
