= Kirill Orekhov =

Russian footballer

Personal information
- Full name: Kirill Nikolayevich Orekhov
- Date of birth: 27 January 1999 (age 27)
- Place of birth: Oryol, Russia
- Height: 1.80 m (5 ft 11 in)
- Position: Midfielder

Youth career
- 2014–2018: Spartak Moscow
- 2018: Arsenal Tula

Senior career*
Years	Team	Apps	(Gls)
2019	Torpedo Minsk	1	(0)
2021	Ida-Virumaa FC Alliance	10	(5)
2021	Sakhalinets Moscow (amateur)		
- * Club domestic league appearances and goals

Kirill Nikolayevich Orekhov (Russian: Кирилл Николаевич Орехов; born 27 January 1999) is a Russian former football player.
