= Yegor Ivanov =

Russian footballer

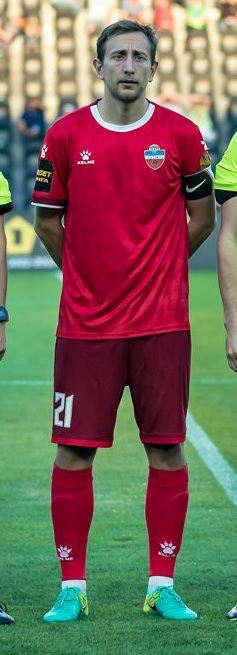
- Ivanov with Yenisey Krasnoyarsk in 2022

Personal information
- Full name: Yegor Olegovich Ivanov
- Date of birth: 19 June 1992 (age 34)
- Place of birth: Omsk, Russia
- Height: 1.83 m (6 ft 0 in)
- Position: Midfielder

Team information
- Current team: Yenisey Krasnoyarsk
- Number: 21

Senior career*
| Years | Team | Apps | (Gls) |
| 2010–2014 | CSKA Moscow | 0 | (0) |
| 2013–2014 | → Yenisey Krasnoyarsk (loan) | 32 | (0) |
| 2014–2024 | Yenisey Krasnoyarsk | 276 | (17) |
| 2024–2025 | Chernomorets Novorossiysk | 30 | (4) |
| 2025– | Yenisey Krasnoyarsk | 20 | (4) |

International career
| 2010 | Russia U-18 | 2 | (0) |
| 2011 | Russia U-19 | 7 | (0) |
| 2012 | Russia U-20 | 3 | (0) |
- * Club domestic league appearances and goals as of 16 May 2026

Yegor Olegovich Ivanov (Russian: Егор Олегович Иванов; born 19 June 1992) is a Russian football player who plays as a centre midfielder for Yenisey Krasnoyarsk.

== Club career ==
In June 2013 Ivanov joined Yenisey Krasnoyarsk on a season long loan from CSKA Moscow. He made his debut in the Russian Football National League for FC Yenisey Krasnoyarsk on 7 July 2013 in a game against FC Rotor Volgograd.
