= Oleg Krasilnichenko =

Russian footballer (born 1997)

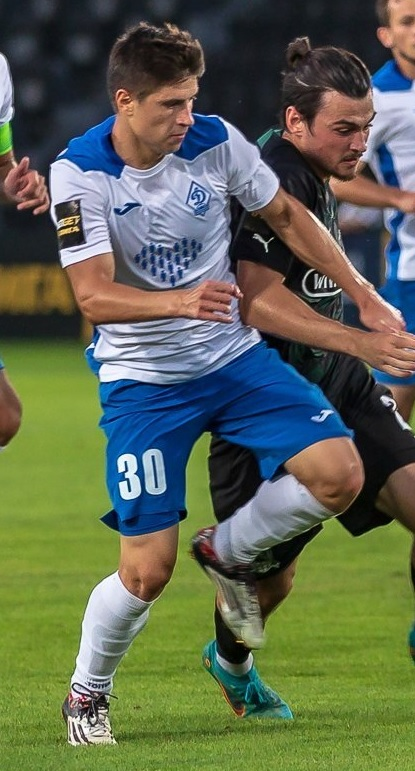
- Krasilnichenko with Dynamo Makhachkala in 2022

Personal information
- Full name: Oleg Sergeyevich Krasilnichenko
- Date of birth: 21 January 1997 (age 29)
- Place of birth: Krymsk, Russia
- Height: 1.73 m (5 ft 8 in)
- Position: Left back

Team information
- Current team: Volga Ulyanovsk
- Number: 3

Youth career
- ShBFR Gelendzhik
- –2017: Spartak Moscow

Senior career*
Years	Team	Apps	(Gls)
2017–2018	Spartak-2 Moscow	15	(0)
2018–2019	Neftekhimik Nizhnekamsk	16	(0)
2019–2020	Fakel Voronezh	18	(0)
2021	Fakel-M Voronezh	2	(0)
2021–2023	Dynamo Makhachkala	60	(3)
2023–2025	Chernomorets Novorossiysk	35	(0)
2025–	Volga Ulyanovsk	49	(0)

International career
2012	Russia U15	6	(0)
2012–2013	Russia U16	14	(0)
2013	Russia U17	6	(0)
2015	Russia U18	6	(0)
- * Club domestic league appearances and goals as of 16 May 2026

Oleg Sergeyevich Krasilnichenko (Russian: Олег Сергеевич Красильниченко; born 21 January 1997) is a Russian footballer who plays for Volga Ulyanovsk.

== Club career ==
He made his debut in the Russian Football National League for FC Spartak-2 Moscow on 8 July 2017 in a game against FC Sibir Novosibirsk.
