= 2018–19 FC Spartak Moscow season =

Spartak Moscow
2018–19 season
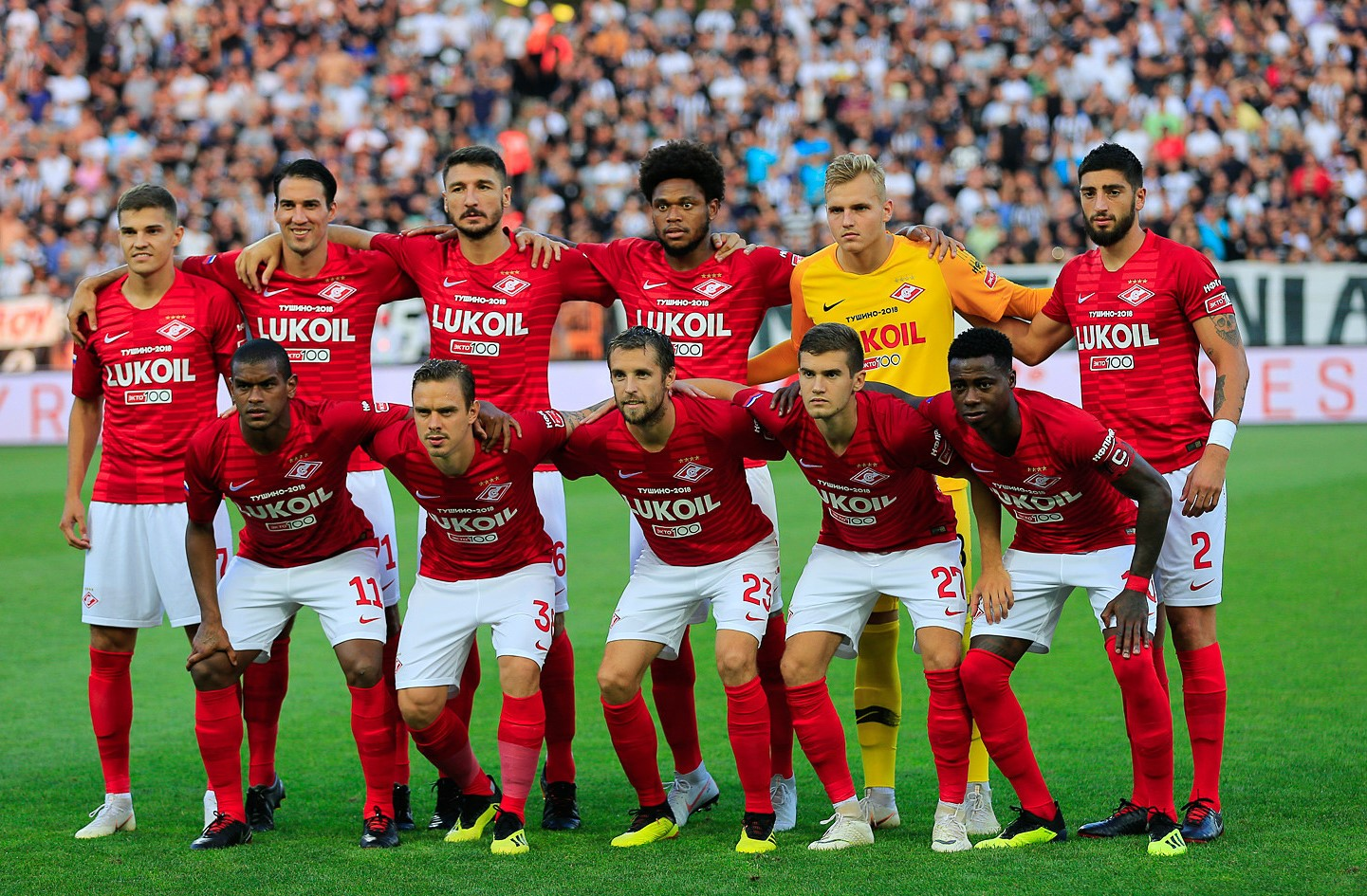
- Chairman: Sergey Rodionov
- Manager: Massimo Carrera (until 22 October); Raúl Riancho (Caretaker) (from 22 October); Oleg Kononov (from 12 November)
- Stadium: Otkrytiye Arena
- Premier League: 5th
- Russian Cup: Quarter-finals
- Champions League: Third qualifying round
- UEFA Europa League: Group stage
- Top goalscorer: League: Zé Luís (7); All: Zé Luís (11)
Home colours	Away colours

The 2018–19 Spartak Moscow season was the twenty-seventh successive season that the club played in the Russian Premier League, the highest tier of association football in Russia.

== Season events ==
On 22 October 2018, Massimo Carrera was sacked as manager, with Raúl Riancho being appointed as caretaker manager.

== Squad ==
As of match played 26 May 2019

No.	Name	Nationality	Position	Date of birth (age)	Signed from	Signed in	Contract ends	Apps.	Goals
Goalkeepers
30	Danila Yermakov	(Russia)	GK	29 December 1998 (aged 20)	Rostov	2018		0	0
31	Anton Shitov	(Russia)	GK	29 January 2000 (aged 19)	Ararat Moscow	2018		0	0
32	Artyom Rebrov	(Russia)	GK	4 March 1984 (aged 35)	Shinnik Yaroslavl	2011		129	0
48	Daniil Yarusov	(Russia)	GK	25 January 2001 (aged 18)	Youth team	2018		0	0
57	Aleksandr Selikhov	(Russia)	GK	7 April 1994 (aged 25)	Amkar Perm	2016		37	0
86	Artyom Poplevchenkov	(Russia)	GK	9 June 2000 (aged 18)	Youth team	2018		0	0
91	Daniil Markov	(Russia)	GK	1 January 2001 (aged 18)	Youth team	2018		0	0
95	Vladislav Teryoshkin	(Russia)	GK	16 July 1995 (aged 23)	Youth Team	2012		0	0
98	Aleksandr Maksimenko	(Russia)	GK	23 February 1998 (aged 21)	Youth Team	2014		32	0
Defenders
2	Samuel Gigot	(France)	DF	12 October 1993 (aged 25)	Gent	2018	2022	11	1
6	Ayrton Lucas	(Brazil)	DF	19 June 1997 (aged 21)	Fluminense	2018		14	0
14	Georgi Dzhikiya	(Russia)	DF	21 November 1993 (aged 25)	Amkar Perm	2016		68	2
16	Salvatore Bocchetti	(Italy)	DF	30 November 1986 (aged 32)	Rubin Kazan	2013		114	5
23	Dmitri Kombarov	(Russia)	DF	22 January 1987 (aged 32)	Dynamo Moscow	2010		274	26
29	Ilya Kutepov	(Russia)	DF	29 July 1993 (aged 25)	Akademiya Tolyatti	2012		78	2
34	Turgay Mokhbaliyev	(Russia)	DF	18 January 2000 (aged 19)	Youth team	2016		0	0
35	Leonid Mironov	(Russia)	DF	14 September 1998 (aged 20)	Youth team	2015		0	0
36	Artyom Voropayev	(Russia)	DF	30 October 1999 (aged 19)	loan from Lada-Tolyatti	2018	2019	0	0
38	Andrey Yeshchenko	(Russia)	DF	9 February 1984 (aged 35)	Anzhi Makhachkala	2016		76	1
39	Pavel Maslov	(Russia)	DF	14 April 2000 (aged 19)	Tyumen	2018		1	0
46	Artyom Mamin	(Russia)	DF	25 July 1997 (aged 21)	Youth team	2014		2	0
53	Artyom Gorbulin	(Russia)	DF	30 January 1999 (aged 20)	Dynamo Moscow	2018		0	0
56	Ilya Gaponov	(Russia)	DF	25 October 1997 (aged 21)	Strogino Moscow	2018		5	0
59	Audrey Yola Zepatta	(Cameroon)	DF	17 February 1999 (aged 20)	Universal Stars	2016		0	0
63	Daniil Petrunin	(Russia)	DF	10 June 1999 (aged 19)	Youth team	2015		0	0
92	Nikolai Rasskazov	(Russia)	DF	4 January 1998 (aged 21)	Youth team	2015		25	1
96	Maksim Aktisov	(Russia)	DF	28 January 2000 (aged 19)	Youth team	2016		0	0
Midfielders
4	Nikolai Tyunin	(Russia)	MF	6 January 1987 (aged 32)	Khimki	2018		1	0
7	Ayaz Guliyev	(Russia)	MF	27 November 1996 (aged 22)	Youth team	2012		11	1
8	Denis Glushakov	(Russia)	MF	27 January 1987 (aged 32)	Lokomotiv Moscow	2013		172	23
11	Fernando	(Brazil)	MF	3 March 1992 (aged 27)	Sampdoria	2016		96	11
15	Maksim Glushenkov	(Russia)	MF	28 July 1999 (aged 19)	Chertanovo Moscow	2019		5	0
22	Mikhail Ignatov	(Russia)	MF	4 May 2000 (aged 19)	Youth team	2016		12	1
25	Lorenzo Melgarejo	(Paraguay)	MF	10 August 1990 (aged 28)	Kuban Krasnodar	2016		98	16
27	Aleksandr Lomovitsky	(Russia)	MF	27 January 1998 (aged 21)	Youth team	2015		24	0
37	Georgi Melkadze	(Russia)	MF	4 April 1997 (aged 22)	Youth team	2014		19	0
42	Vladislav Vasilyev	(Russia)	MF	27 July 1999 (aged 19)	Dnepr Smolensk	2019		19	0
43	Pyotr Volodkin	(Russia)	MF	4 March 1999 (aged 20)	Youth team	2015		0	0
47	Roman Zobnin	(Russia)	MF	11 February 1994 (aged 25)	Dynamo Moscow	2016		85	3
54	Nail Umyarov	(Russia)	MF	27 June 2000 (aged 18)	Chertanovo Moscow	2019		5	0
70	Ivan Repyakh	(Russia)	MF	18 October 2001 (aged 17)	Youth team	2018		0	0
74	Dmitri Markitesov	(Russia)	MF	22 March 2001 (aged 18)	Youth team	2018		0	0
75	Fanil Sungatulin	(Russia)	MF	24 December 2001 (aged 17)	Youth team	2018		0	0
76	Maksim Kalachevsky	(Russia)	MF	5 February 1999 (aged 20)	Youth team	2018		0	0
80	Nikita Bakalyuk	(Russia)	MF	3 April 2001 (aged 18)	Youth team	2018		0	0
80	Nikita Bakalyuk	(Russia)	MF	3 April 2001 (aged 18)	Youth team	2018		0	0
82	Ilya Mazurov	(Russia)	MF	7 June 1999 (aged 19)	Youth team	2015		0	0
87	Soltmurad Bakayev	(Russia)	MF	5 August 1999 (aged 19)	Youth team	2015		1	0
88	Aleksandr Tashayev	(Russia)	MF	23 June 1994 (aged 24)	Dynamo Moscow	2018		24	0
89	Dmitri Mitroga	(Russia)	MF	2 December 2000 (aged 18)	Youth team	2018		0	0
90	Kirill Folmer	(Russia)	MF	25 February 2000 (aged 19)	Youth team	2018		0	0
94	Sofiane Hanni	(Algeria)	MF	4 March 1996 (aged 23)	Anderlecht	2018		38	6
97	Danil Poluboyarinov	(Russia)	MF	4 February 1997 (aged 22)	Youth team	2014		0	0
Forwards
9	Zé Luís	(Cape Verde)	FW	24 January 1991 (aged 28)	Braga	2015		108	35
12	Luiz Adriano	(Brazil)	FW	12 April 1987 (aged 32)	A.C. Milan	2016		75	34
28	Thierno Thioub	(Senegal)	FW	1 June 1998 (aged 20)	Stade de Mbour	2018		0	0
61	Danila Proshlyakov	(Russia)	FW	8 March 2000 (aged 19)	Youth team	2016		0	0
66	Sylvanus Nimely	(Liberia)	FW	4 April 1998 (aged 21)	MFK Karviná	2016		1	0
79	Aleksandr Rudenko	(Russia)	FW	15 March 1999 (aged 20)	Youth team	2015		0	0
81	Daniil Lopatin	(Russia)	FW	20 December 2000 (aged 18)	Youth team	2016		0	0
Away on loan
7	Jano Ananidze	(Georgia (country))	MF	10 October 1992 (aged 26)	Youth Team	2009		137	16
17	Georgi Tigiyev	(Russia)	DF	20 June 1995 (aged 23)	Anzhi Makhachkala	2017		7	0
18	Zelimkhan Bakayev	(Russia)	MF	1 July 1996 (aged 22)	Youth team	2013		7	0
40	Artyom Timofeyev	(Russia)	MF	12 January 1994 (aged 25)	Your team	2012		32	0
49	Idrisa Sambú	(Portugal)	FW	27 March 1998 (aged 21)	Porto B	2016		0	0
84	Boris Tsygankov	(Russia)	MF	17 April 1998 (aged 21)	Youth team	2015		0	0
99	Pedro Rocha	(Brazil)	FW	1 October 1994 (aged 24)	Grêmio	2017		19	1
Players that left Spartak Moscow during the season
3	Marko Petković	(Serbia)	DF	3 September 1992 (aged 26)	Red Star Belgrade	2017		16	0
10	Quincy Promes	(Netherlands)	MF	4 January 1992 (aged 27)	Twente	2014		136	67
19	Aleksandr Samedov	(Russia)	MF	19 July 1984 (aged 34)	Lokomotiv Moscow	2017		108	15
26	Roman Eremenko	(Finland)	MF	19 March 1987 (aged 32)	CSKA Moscow	2018		7	0
71	Ivelin Popov	(Bulgaria)	MF	26 October 1987 (aged 31)	Kuban Krasnodar	2015		96	9
83	Vladislav Panteleyev	(Russia)	MF	15 August 1996 (aged 22)	Youth team	2012		2	0

== Transfers ==
=== In ===
Date	Position	Nationality	Name	From	Fee	Ref.
Summer 2018	GK	(Russia)	Danila Yermakov	Rostov	Undisclosed	
Summer 2018	GK	(Russia)	Anton Shitov	Ararat Moscow	Undisclosed	
Summer 2018	DF	(Russia)	Ilya Gaponov	Strogino Moscow	Undisclosed	
Summer 2018	DF	(Russia)	Ruslan Litvinov			
Summer 2018	DF	(Russia)	Nikita Morgunov			
Summer 2018	DF	(Russia)	Fanil Sungatulin			
Summer 2018	MF	(Russia)	Maksim Danilin	Academy		
Summer 2018	FW	(Russia)	Nikita Sudarikov	Academy		
4 June 2018	DF	(France)	Samuel Gigot	Gent	Undisclosed	
13 June 2018	DF	(Russia)	Pavel Maslov	Tyumen	Undisclosed	
6 July 2018	MF	(Russia)	Aleksandr Tashayev	Dynamo Moscow	Undisclosed	
10 August 2018	MF	(Finland)	Roman Eremenko	CSKA Moscow	Free	
23 August 2018	FW	(Senegal)	Thierno Thioub	Stade de Mbour	Undisclosed	
17 December 2018	DF	(Brazil)	Ayrton Lucas	Fluminense	Undisclosed	
8 January 2019	MF	(Russia)	Maksim Glushenkov	Chertanovo Moscow	Undisclosed	
8 January 2019	MF	(Russia)	Nail Umyarov	Chertanovo Moscow	Undisclosed	
9 January 2019	MF	(Russia)	Ayaz Guliyev	Rostov	Undisclosed	
Winter 2019	GK	(Russia)	Aleksandr Alekseyev			
Winter 2019	MF	(Russia)	Stepan Melnikov			
Winter 2019	MF	(Russia)	Aslan Mutaliyev			
Winter 2019	MF	(Russia)	Stepan Oganesyan	UOR #5 Yegoryevsk	Undisclosed	
Winter 2019	MF	(Russia)	Vladislav Vasilyev	Dnepr Smolensk	Undisclosed	

=== Loans in ===
Date from	Position	Nationality	Name	From	Date to	Ref.
5 February 2018	MF	(Finland)	Sergei Eremenko	Spartaks Jūrmala	December 2018	

=== Out ===
Date	Position	Nationality	Name	To	Fee	Ref.
Summer 2018	DF	(Russia)	Igor Leontyev	Tyumen	Undisclosed	
29 June 2018	DF	(Russia)	Konstantin Shcherbakov	Rotor-2 Volgograd	Undisclosed	
9 July 2018	FW	(Zambia)	Fashion Sakala	Oostende	Undisclosed	
31 August 2018	MF	(Netherlands)	Quincy Promes	Sevilla	Undisclosed	
27 December 2018	MF	(Russia)	Vladislav Panteleyev	Rubin Kazan	Undisclosed	

=== Loans out ===
Date from	Position	Nationality	Name	To	Date to	Ref.
20 June 2018	FW	(Russia)	Denis Davydov	Spartaks Jūrmala	31 December 2018	
29 June 2018	FW	(Portugal)	Idrisa Sambú	Mouscron	End of Season	
1 August 2018	MF	(Russia)	Zelimkhan Bakayev	Arsenal Tula	End of Season	
31 August 2018	DF	(Russia)	Georgi Tigiyev	Krylia Sovetov	28 February 2019	
13 January 2019	MF	(Georgia (country))	Jano Ananidze	Krylia Sovetov	End of Season	
13 January 2019	MF	(Russia)	Artyom Timofeyev	Krylia Sovetov	End of Season	
28 February 2019	DF	(Russia)	Georgi Tigiyev	Dinamo Minsk	End of Season	
3 April 2019	FW	(Brazil)	Pedro Rocha	Cruzeiro	31 December 2019	

=== Released ===
Date	Position	Nationality	Name	Joined	Date
Summer 2018	GK	(Russia)	Vadim Averkiyev		
Summer 2018	GK	(Russia)	Sergei Lazarev	Dolgoprudny	
Summer 2018	GK	(Russia)	Vlad Yeleferenko		
Summer 2018	DF	(Russia)	Ilya Ivanov	Arsenal Tula	
Summer 2018	DF	(Russia)	Ivan Khomukha	SKA-Khabarovsk	28 June 2018
Summer 2018	DF	(Russia)	Oleg Krasilnichenko	Neftekhimik Nizhnekamsk	14 August 2018
Summer 2018	DF	(Russia)	Denis Kutin	Armavir	25 August 2018
Summer 2018	DF	(Russia)	Shamsiddin Shanbiyev	Ural Yekaterinburg	22 October 2018
Summer 2018	DF	(Russia)	Artyom Sokol	Arsenal Tula	27 July 2018
Summer 2018	MF	(Russia)	Ayaz Guliyev	Rostov	6 June 2018
Summer 2018	MF	(Russia)	Kirill Orekhov	Arsenal Tula	
Summer 2018	MF	(Russia)	Denis Patsev	Arsenal Tula	
Summer 2018	MF	(Russia)	Aleksandr Zuyev	Rostov	27 May 2018
Summer 2018	FW	(Russia)	Yegor Nikulin	Shinnik Yaroslavl	24 June 2018
30 June 2018	DF	(Germany)	Serdar Tasci	İstanbul Başakşehir	5 January 2019
5 January 2019	MF	(Russia)	Aleksandr Samedov	Krylia Sovetov Samara	13 January 2019
8 January 2019	DF	(Serbia)	Marko Petković		
8 January 2019	MF	(Bulgaria)	Ivelin Popov	Rostov	24 January 2019
8 January 2019	MF	(Finland)	Roman Eremenko	Rostov	18 January 2019
19 February 2019	FW	(Russia)	Denis Davydov	Nizhny Novgorod	27 February 2019
20 February 2019	DF	(Russia)	Aleksandr Likhachyov	Tyumen	
Winter 2019	FW	(Russia)	Nikita Sudarikov		

== Competitions ==
=== Russian Premier League ===
==== Results by round ====
Round	1	2	3	4	5	6	7	8	9	10	11	12	13	14	15	16	17	18	19	20	21	22	23	24	25	26	27	28	29	30
Ground	H	A	H	A	H	A	H	A	H	A	H	A	H	A	H	H	A	H	A	H	A	H	A	H	A	H	A	H	A	A
Result	W	D	W	W	W	D	L	D	L	W	L	D	L	L	W	W	W	D	W	D	W	L	L	W	L	D	W	W	W	L
Position	4	5	2	2	2	2	3	4	5	4	6	5	6	9	7	4	4	4	4	5	5	5	5	5	5	5	5	4	4	5

Updated to match(es) played on 26 May 2019. Source: See Results
A = Away; H = Home; W = Win; D = Draw; L = Loss

==== Results ====
28 July 2018 1	Spartak Moscow	1 – 0	Orenburg	Moscow
19:00 MSK (UTC+3)	Gigot 4'	Report	Frolov (yellow card) 4'; Terekhov (yellow card) 36'; Oyewole (yellow card) 36'	Stadium: Otkritie Arena; Attendance: 36,672; Referee: Roman Galimov

4 August 2018 2	Lokomotiv Moscow	0 – 0	Spartak Moscow	Moscow
19:00 MSK (UTC+3)	Denisov (yellow card) 60'	Report	Tashayev (yellow card) 27'; Promes (yellow card) 52'; Fernando (yellow card) 79'; Bocchetti (yellow card) 80'; Yeshchenko (yellow card) 90+3'	Stadium: RZD Arena; Attendance: 22,027; Referee: Vladimir Moskalev

11 August 2018 3	Spartak Moscow	1 – 0	Anzhi Makhachkala	Moscow
19:00 MSK (UTC+3)	Zé Luís 70'	Report	Rabiu (yellow card) 25'; Belorukov (yellow card) 45+2' (yellow-red card) 68'; Ponce (red card) 49'; Chaykovskyi (yellow card) 52'; Gapon (yellow card) 90+2'	Stadium: Otkritie Arena; Attendance: 27,856; Referee: Kirill Levnikov

18 August 2018 4	Krasnodar	0 – 1	Spartak Moscow	Krasnodar
19:00 MSK (UTC+3)	Stotsky (yellow card) 45+1'; Ari (yellow card) 85' (red card) 90+1'	Report	Fernando (yellow card) 55'; Tashayev (yellow card) 72'; Zé Luís 88'	Stadium: Krasnodar Stadium; Attendance: 34,302; Referee: Sergey Lapochkin

25 August 2018 5	Spartak Moscow	2 – 1	Dynamo Moscow	Moscow
19:00 MSK (UTC+3)	Promes 7' (pen.); Melgarejo 14'; Rasskazov (yellow card) 42'; Zobnin (yellow card) 63'; Luiz Adriano (yellow card) 90+3'	Report	Rykov (yellow card) 26' (goal) 82'; Sow (yellow card) 34'; Tetteh (yellow card) 49'	Stadium: Otkritie Arena; Attendance: 43,139; Referee: Evgeny Turbin

2 September 2018 6	Zenit St.Petersburg	0 – 0	Spartak Moscow	Saint Petersburg
19:00 MSK (UTC+3)	Ivanović (yellow card) 45'	Report	Bocchetti (yellow card) 34'; Rasskazov (yellow card) 44'; Zé Luís (yellow card) 54'; Melgarejo (yellow card) 83'; Popov (yellow card) 90+3'	Stadium: Krestovsky Stadium; Attendance: 61,467; Referee: Vladimir Moskalyov

16 September 2018 7	Spartak Moscow	1 – 2	Akhmat Grozny	Moscow
19:00 MSK (UTC+3)	Zobnin (yellow card) 34'; Hanni (yellow card) 38'; Dzhikiya 56'	Report	Rodolfo 20' (pen.); Berisha (yellow card) 25'; Ivanov (yellow card) 39'; Semyonov (yellow card) 42'; Gashchenkov (yellow card) 54'; Shvets 86'; Gorodov (yellow card) 90+2'	Stadium: Otkritie Arena; Attendance: 30,136; Referee: Vasily Kazartsev

23 September 2018 8	CSKA Moscow	1 – 1	Spartak Moscow	Moscow
19:00 MSK (UTC+3)	Becão (yellow card) 40'; Vlašić 63'; Chernov (yellow card) 90+1'; Nababkin (yellow card) 90+2'	Report	Fernando 30'; Samedov (yellow card) 40'	Stadium: VEB Arena; Attendance: 29,361; Referee: Sergei Karasev

30 September 2018 9	Spartak Moscow	0 – 1	Rostov	Moscow
19:00 MSK (UTC+3)		Report	Kalachev (yellow card) 13'; Parshivlyuk (yellow card) 23'; Zuyev 67'	Stadium: Otkritie Arena; Attendance: 33,328; Referee: Nikolay Voloshin

7 October 2018 10	Yenisey Krasnoyarsk	2 – 3	Spartak Moscow	Krasnoyarsk
11:30 MSK (UTC+3)	Zanev (yellow card) 15'; Dugalić 51' (yellow card) 58'; Yatchenko (yellow card) 61'; Kichin 69' (pen.); Fatullayev (yellow card) 79'	Report	Lomovitsky (yellow card) 18'; Zé Luís (yellow card) 45+1' (goal) 59' (pen.); Ignatov 47'; Bocchetti (yellow card) 68'; Timofeyev 90+2'	Stadium: Central Stadium; Attendance: 14,915; Referee: Sergey Lapochkin

21 October 2018 11	Spartak Moscow	2 – 3	Arsenal Tula	Moscow
16:30 MSK (UTC+3)	Zé Luís 13', 45+2'; Kutepov (yellow card) 35'; Fernando (yellow card) 40'; Petković (yellow card) 45+3'	Report	Ožegović (penalty missed) 35' 35' (yellow card) 40'; Lesovoy 48'; Mirzov 65'	Stadium: Otkritie Arena; Attendance: 31,684; Referee: Mikhail Vilkov

29 October 2018 12	Rubin Kazan	1 – 1	Spartak Moscow	Kazan
20:30 MSK (UTC+3)	Podberyozkin (yellow card) 47'; Ustinov (yellow card) 63'; Sorokin 90+2'	Report	Kombarov (yellow card) 41' (goal) 78' (pen.); Hanni (yellow card) 44'; Tashayev (yellow card) 79'; Zobnin (yellow card) 87'	Stadium: Kazan Arena; Attendance: 16,101; Referee: Vasily Kazartsev

4 November 2018 13	Spartak Moscow	1 – 2	Ural Yekaterinburg	Moscow
19:00 MSK (UTC+3)	Kutepov (yellow card) 28'; Dzhikiya (yellow card) 38'; Luiz Adriano 74'	Report	Haroyan (yellow card) 17'; Dimitrov 29'; Panyukov (yellow card) 38' (goal) 76'; Kulakov (yellow card) 45'; Bavin (yellow card) 47'; El Kabir (yellow card) 90'	Stadium: Otkritie Arena; Attendance: 23,237; Referee: Vitaly Meshkov

11 November 2018 14	Ufa	2 – 0	Spartak Moscow	Ufa
14:00 MSK (UTC+3)	Thill (yellow card) 56'; Putsko (yellow card) 72'; Sysuyev 75', (yellow card) 78'; Carp (yellow card) 89'; Bizjak 90+2'	Report	Popov (yellow card) 70'; Kutepov (yellow card) 86'	Stadium: Neftyanik Stadium; Attendance: 10,224; Referee: Kirill Levnikov

25 November 2018 15	Spartak Moscow	3 – 1	Krylia Sovetov	Moscow
14:00 MSK (UTC+3)	Zé Luís (yellow card) 46'; Hanni 59'; Melgarejo 61'; Luiz Adriano (yellow card) 88' (goal) 90'	Report	Bashkirov (yellow card) 9'; Kornilenko 49'; Sheydayev (yellow card) 83'	Stadium: Otkritie Arena; Attendance: 25,092; Referee: Vladimir Moskalyov

2 December 2018 16	Spartak Moscow	2 – 1	Lokomotiv Moscow	Moscow
19:00 MSK (UTC+3)	Glushakov 6' (yellow card) 62'; Luiz Adriano 38'; Rasskazov (red card) 67'	Report	Denisov (yellow card) 14'; Ćorluka (yellow card) 45'; Barinov (yellow card) 58'; Smolov (penalty missed) 69'; Farfán 79'; Kvirkvelia (yellow card) 90+3'	Stadium: Otkritie Arena; Attendance: 25,006; Referee: Sergei Karasev

8 December 2018 17	Anzhi Makhachkala	0 – 3	Spartak Moscow	Kaspiysk
20:00 MSK (UTC+3)	Gigolayev (yellow card) 14' (yellow-red card) 54'; Glebov (yellow card) 78'	Report	Zé Luís 45+1' (pen.), 84'; Luiz Adriano 55' (pen.); Popov (yellow card) 61'; Kutepov (yellow card) 78'	Stadium: Anzhi Arena; Attendance: 4,280; Referee: Vladislav Bezborodov

3 March 2019 18	Spartak Moscow	1 – 1	Krasnodar	Moscow
19:00 MSK (UTC+3)	Zé Luís 14'; Hanni (yellow card) 33'	Report	Pereyra 26'; Martynovich (yellow card) 49' (yellow-red card) 90+4'; Kaboré (yellow card) 52'; Ari (yellow card) 76'	Stadium: Otkritie Arena; Attendance: 27,662; Referee: Kirill Levnikov

10 March 2019 19	Dynamo Moscow	0 – 1	Spartak Moscow	Khimki
19:00 MSK (UTC+3)	Sow (yellow card) 15'; Yevgenyev (yellow card) 85'	Report	Dzhikiya 16' (yellow card) 76'; Guliyev (yellow card) 56'; Ayrton (yellow card) 69'; Luiz Adriano (yellow card) 80'; Zé Luís (yellow card) 83'	Stadium: Arena Khimki; Attendance: 14,674; Referee: Evgeny Turbin

17 March 2019 20	Spartak Moscow	1 – 1	Zenit St.Petersburg	Moscow
19:00 MSK (UTC+3)	Glushakov 13' (yellow card) 61'; Dzhikiya (yellow card) 34'; Zobnin (yellow card) 57'; Hanni (yellow card) 86'	Report	Barrios 27' (yellow card) 90+1'; Smolnikov (yellow card) 45'; Azmoun (yellow card) 55'	Stadium: Otkritie Arena; Attendance: 43,616; Referee: Vladimir Moskalev

30 March 2019 21	Akhmat Grozny	1 – 3	Spartak Moscow	Grozny
16:30 MSK (UTC+3)	Semyonov (yellow card) 6' (yellow-red card) 63'; Balaj 9'; Pliyev (yellow card) 18'; Ivanov (yellow card) 77'	Report	Luiz Adriano 7' (pen.), 68'; Zé Luís (yellow card) 16'; Bocchetti (yellow card) 21'; Ayrton (yellow card) 78'; Melkadze (yellow card) 83'; Guliyev (yellow card) 90'; Glushakov 90+3'	Stadium: Akhmat-Arena; Attendance: 10,124; Referee: Sergey Lapochkin

6 April 2019 22	Spartak Moscow	0 – 2	CSKA Moscow	Moscow
19:00 MSK (UTC+3)	Guliyev (yellow card) 63'; Dzhikiya (yellow card) 73'	Report	Sigurðsson 46', 55'; Becão (yellow card) 49'; Akhmetov (yellow card) 52'	Stadium: Otkritie Arena; Attendance: 44,486; Referee: Vitali Meshkov

14 April 2019 23	Rostov	2 – 1	Spartak Moscow	Rostov-on-Don
19:00 MSK (UTC+3)	Gațcan 13'; Parshivlyuk (yellow card) 28'; Glebov (yellow card) 45'; Logashov (yellow card) 56'; Eremenko (yellow card) 61'; Shomurodov 80'	Report	Zobnin 27'; Bocchetti (yellow card) 64'; Melkadze (yellow card) 77'	Stadium: Rostov Arena; Attendance: 41,097; Referee: Vladislav Bezborodov

21 April 2019 24	Spartak Moscow	2 – 0	Yenisey Krasnoyarsk	Moscow
19:00 MSK (UTC+3)	Guliyev (yellow card) 21' (goal) 83'; Gigot (yellow card) 37'; Rasskazov 45+1'	Report	Danchenko (yellow card) 32'	Stadium: Otkritie Arena; Attendance: 26,655; Referee: Sergey Ivanov

25 April 2019 25	Arsenal Tula	3 – 0	Spartak Moscow	Tula
20:30 MSK (UTC+3)	Kangwa 6'; Gorbatenko (yellow card) 22'; Tkachyov 24' (yellow card) 57'; Mirzov 37' (pen.); Kostadinov (yellow card) 60'	Report		Stadium: Arsenal Stadium; Attendance: 18,347; Referee: Mikhail Vilkov

29 April 2019 26	Spartak Moscow	1 – 1	Rubin Kazan	Moscow
19:30 MSK (UTC+3)	Lomovitsky (yellow card) 14'; Fernando 23'; Zé Luís (yellow card) 41'	Report	Sorokin (yellow card) 45+1' (goal) 87'	Stadium: Otkritie Arena; Attendance: 20,015; Referee: Vasily Kazartsev

4 May 2019 27	Ural Yekaterinburg	0 – 1	Spartak Moscow	Yekaterinburg
14:00 MSK (UTC+3)	Boumal (yellow card) 57'; Yegorychev (yellow card) 67'	Report	Yeshchenko (yellow card) 57'; Guliyev (yellow card) 64'; Fernando 82'	Stadium: Central Stadium; Attendance: 25,733; Referee: Kirill Levnikov

12 May 2019 28	Spartak Moscow	1 – 0	Ufa	Moscow
16:30 MSK (UTC+3)	Zé Luís 11'; Zobnin (yellow card) 39'	Report	Igboun (yellow card) 42'; Carp (yellow card) 45+1'; Thill (yellow card) 77'	Stadium: Otkritie Arena; Referee: Pavel Kukuyan

18 May 2019 29	Krylia Sovetov	1 – 2	Spartak Moscow	Samara
19:00 MSK (UTC+3)	Denisov (yellow card) 38'; Ryzhikov (yellow card) 43'; Burlak 83'	Report	Zé Luís 18' (pen.); Luiz Adriano (yellow card) 39'; Melgarejo (yellow card) 45' (goal) 50'; Gaponov (yellow card) 47'; Zobnin (yellow card) 48'; Fernando (yellow card) 88'; Guliyev (yellow card) 90+6'	Stadium: Samara Arena; Attendance: 37,276; Referee: Vasiliy Kazartsev

26 May 2019 30	Orenburg	2 – 0	Spartak Moscow	Orenburg
14:00 MSK (UTC+3)	Alves 8'; Popović (yellow card) 11'; Despotović (yellow card) 12'; Malykh (yellow card) 78'; Dovbnya (yellow card) 90'; Kulishev 90+4' (yellow card) 90+4'	Report	Guliyev (yellow card) 27'; Melgarejo (yellow card) 78'	Stadium: Gazovik Stadium; Attendance: 6,927; Referee: Kirill Levnikov

==== League table ====
Pos	Team	Pld	W	D	L	GF	GA	GD	Pts	Qualification or relegation
3	Krasnodar	30	16	8	6	55	23	+32	56 (Note: Head-to-head away goals: Lokomotiv 1, Krasnodar 0.)	Qualification for the Champions League third qualifying round
4	CSKA Moscow	30	14	9	7	46	23	+23	51	Qualification for the Europa League group stage (Note: Lokomotiv Moscow won the 2018–19 Russian Cup. As they already qualified for the Champions League, the Europa League group stage spot (originally designated for the Cup winner) goes to the fourth-placed team, third qualifying round spot goes to fifth-placed team and second qualifying round spot goes to sixth-placed team.)
5	Spartak Moscow	30	14	7	9	36	31	+5	49	Qualification for the Europa League third qualifying round
6	Arsenal Tula	30	12	10	8	40	33	+7	46	Qualification for the Europa League second qualifying round
7	Orenburg	30	12	7	11	39	34	+5	43	

Updated to match(es) played on 26 May 2019. Source: Russian Premier League, Soccerway
Rules for classification: 1) Points; 2) Head-to-head points; 3) Head-to-head matches won; 4) Head-to-head goal difference; 5) Head-to-head goals scored; 6) Head-to-head away goals; 7) Matches won; 8) Goal difference; 9) Goals scored; 10) Away goals scored; 11) Play-off.

=== Russian Cup ===
26 September 2018 Round of 32	Chernomorets Novorossiysk	0 – 1	Spartak Moscow	Novorossiysk
18:30 MSK (UTC+3)	Lezgintsev (yellow card) 48'; Mendel (yellow card) 51'; Zakharov (yellow card) 76' (yellow-red card) 90+1'	Report	Tashayev (yellow card) 16'; Zé Luís 28'; Lomovitsky (yellow card) 70'; Maslov (yellow card) 85'	Stadium: Central Stadium; Attendance: 12,500; Referee: Kirill Levnikov

1 November 2018 Round of 16	Spartak Moscow	1 – 0	Anzhi Makhachkala	Moscow
20:00 MSK (UTC+3)	Hanni 20'; Timofeyev (yellow card) 87'; Kutepov (yellow card) 90+2'	Report	Chancellor (yellow card) 40'; Khamdamov (yellow card) 90+1'	Stadium: Otkritie Arena; Attendance: 15,848; Referee: Nikolay Voloshin

5 December 2018 Quarterfinal 1st leg	Spartak Moscow	1 – 1	Ural Yekaterinburg	Moscow
19:30 MSK (UTC+3)	Kutepov (yellow card) 21'; Kombarov (yellow card) 40'; Hanni 48'; Glushakov (yellow card) 55'	Report	Bavin (yellow card) 13'; Yegorychev (yellow card) 53'; Ilyin 67'; El Kabir (yellow card) 90+2'	Stadium: Otkritie Arena; Attendance: 9,333; Referee: Vasiliy Kazartsev

7 March 2019 Quarterfinal 2nd leg	Ural Yekaterinburg	1 – 0	Spartak Moscow	Yekaterinburg
17:00 MSK (UTC+3)	Strandberg (yellow card) 24'; Bicfalvi 34'; Kulakov (yellow card) 60'; Palyakow (yellow card) 71'; Hodzyur (yellow card) 84'	Report	Rasskazov (yellow card) 40'; Melgarejo (yellow card) 44'; Zobnin (yellow card) 90+4'	Stadium: Central Stadium; Attendance: 18,292; Referee: Mikhail Vilkov

=== UEFA Champions League ===
==== Qualifying rounds ====
8 August 2018 Third qualifying round 1st leg	PAOK (Greece)	3 – 2	(Russia) Spartak Moscow	Thessaloniki, Greece
20:00 EEST (UTC+3)	Prijović 29' (pen.); Limnios 37'; Pelkas 44'; El Kaddouri (yellow card) 58'; Khacheridi (yellow card) 69'; Maurício (yellow card) 77'	Report	Popov 7'; Promes 17' (penalty missed) 71'; Gigot (yellow card) 19'; Zobnin (yellow card) 39'; Lomovitskiy (yellow card) 72'; Fernando (yellow card) 83'	Stadium: Toumba Stadium; Attendance: 24,463; Referee: Orel Grinfeld (Israel)

14 August 2018 Third qualifying round 2nd leg	Spartak Moscow (Russia)	0 – 0 (2 – 3 agg.)	(Greece) PAOK	Moscow, Russia
20:30 MSK (UTC+3)	Fernando (yellow card) 22'; Luiz Adriano (red card) 33'; Dzhikiya (yellow card) 37'; Zobnin (yellow card) 85'	Report	Léo Matos (yellow card) 25'; Paschalakis (yellow card) 34'; El Kaddouri (yellow card) 37'	Stadium: Otkritie Arena; Referee: Ruddy Buquet (France)

=== UEFA Europe League ===
==== Group stage ====
Pos	Team	Pld	W	D	L	GF	GA	GD	Pts	Qualification
1	(Spain) Villarreal	6	2	4	0	12	5	+7	10 (Note: Head-to-head points: Villarreal 4, Rapid Wien 1.)	Advance to knockout phase
2	(Austria) Rapid Wien	6	3	1	2	6	9	−3	10	Advance to knockout phase
3	(Scotland) Rangers	6	1	3	2	8	8	0	6	
4	(Russia) Spartak Moscow	6	1	2	3	8	12	−4	5	

Source: UEFA
Rules for classification: Group stage tiebreakers
Notes:

20 September 2018 1	Rapid Wien (Austria)	2–0	(Russia) Spartak Moscow	Vienna, Austria
19:55 MSK (UTC+3)	Ljubicic (yellow card) 11'; Timofeyev 50' (o.g.); Murg 68'	Report	Zé Luís (yellow card) 32'; Lomovitsky (yellow card) 70'	Stadium: Allianz Stadion; Attendance: 21,400; Referee: Sandro Schärer (Switzerland)

4 October 2018 2	Spartak Moscow (Russia)	3–3	(Spain) Villarreal	Moscow, Russia
22:00 MSK (UTC+3)	Zé Luís 34' (pen.), 82'; Dzhikiya (yellow card) 81'; Fernando (yellow card) 83'; Melgarejo 85'; Rasskazov (yellow card) 86'	Report	Toko Ekambi 13'; Fornals 49'; Sansone (yellow card) 51'; Gerard (yellow card) 81'; Cazorla 90+6' (pen.)	Stadium: Otkritie Arena; Attendance: 21,264; Referee: Daniel Siebert (Germany)

25 October 2018 3	Rangers (Scotland)	0–0	(Russia) Spartak Moscow	Glasgow, Scotland
22:00 MSK (UTC+3)	Morelos (yellow card) 45+2'; Candeias (yellow card) 59'	Report	Dzhikiya (yellow card) 33'; Fernando (yellow card) 45'	Stadium: Ibrox; Attendance: 49,068; Referee: Kevin Blom (Netherlands)

8 November 2018 4	Spartak Moscow (Russia)	4–3	(Scotland) Rangers	Moscow, Russia
20:55 MSK (UTC+3)	Popov (yellow card) 15'; Melgarejo 22', (yellow card) 77'; Rasskazov (yellow card) 28'; Fernando (yellow card) 30'; Goldson 35' (o.g.); Luiz Adriano 58'; Hanni 59'; Bocchetti (yellow card) 63'	Report	Eremenko 5' (o.g.); Candeias 27'; Coulibaly (yellow card) 34'; Middleton 41'; Morelos (yellow card) 78'	Stadium: Otkritie Arena; Attendance: 22,296; Referee: Ivan Bebek (Croatia)

29 November 2018 5	Spartak Moscow (Russia)	1–2	(Austria) Rapid Wien	Moscow, Russia
18:50 MSK (UTC+3)	Zé Luís 20'; Glushakov (yellow card) 73'	Report	Barać (yellow card) 27'; Martic (yellow card) 41'; Hofmann (yellow card) 59'; Müldür 80'; Schobesberger 90+1'	Stadium: Otkritie Arena; Attendance: 20,739; Referee: Paweł Gil (Poland)

13 December 2018 6	Villarreal (Spain)	2–0	(Russia) Spartak Moscow	Villarreal, Spain
20:55 MSK (UTC+3)	Chukwueze 11'; Ekambi 48'; Álvaro (yellow card) 71'; Costa (red card) 90'; Fernández (yellow card) 90+2'	Report	Lomovitsky (yellow card) 22'; Zé Luís (yellow card) 85'; Dzhikiya (yellow card) 90'; Kutepov (yellow card) 90+1'	Stadium: Estadio de la Cerámica; Attendance: 12,903; Referee: Andris Treimanis (Latvia)

== Squad statistics ==
As of match played 26 May 2019

=== Appearances and goals ===
No.	Pos	Nat	Player	Total		Premier League		Russian Cup		Champions League		Europa League	
No.	Pos	Nat	Player	Apps	Goals	Apps	Goals	Apps	Goals	Apps	Goals	Apps	Goals
2	DF	(France) FRA	Samuel Gigot	11	1	9	1	0	0	0	0	2	0
6	DF	(Brazil) BRA	Ayrton Lucas	14	0	12+1	0	1	0	0	0	0	0
7	MF	(Russia) RUS	Ayaz Guliyev	11	1	9+1	1	1	0	0	0	0	0
8	MF	(Russia) RUS	Denis Glushakov	25	3	15+3	3	3	0	1	0	2+1	0
9	FW	(Cape Verde) CPV	Zé Luís	36	14	22+3	10	3	1	0+2	0	5+1	3
11	MF	(Brazil) BRA	Fernando	28	3	20+1	3	0+1	0	2	0	4	0
12	FW	(Brazil) BRA	Luiz Adriano	29	7	15+7	6	2	0	2	0	3	1
14	DF	(Russia) RUS	Georgi Dzhikiya	35	2	25+1	2	3	0	1	0	5	0
15	MF	(Russia) RUS	Maksim Glushenkov	5	0	0+5	0	0	0	0	0	0	0
16	DF	(Italy) ITA	Salvatore Bocchetti	22	0	14+1	0	1+1	0	1	0	4	0
22	MF	(Russia) RUS	Mikhail Ignatov	12	1	3+5	1	0+1	0	0	0	2+1	0
23	DF	(Russia) RUS	Dmitri Kombarov	19	1	13	1	2	0	2	0	2	0
25	MF	(Paraguay) PAR	Lorenzo Melgarejo	33	5	19+4	3	3	0	0+1	0	6	2
27	MF	(Russia) RUS	Aleksandr Lomovitskiy	24	0	9+8	0	2	0	1	0	4	0
29	DF	(Russia) RUS	Ilya Kutepov	14	0	9	0	2	0	0	0	3	0
32	GK	(Russia) RUS	Artyom Rebrov	6	0	3	0	2	0	0	0	1	0
37	FW	(Russia) RUS	Georgi Melkadze	11	0	3+7	0	1	0	0	0	0	0
38	DF	(Russia) RUS	Andrey Yeshchenko	15	0	9+3	0	0	0	2	0	1	0
39	DF	(Russia) RUS	Pavel Maslov	1	0	0	0	1	0	0	0	0	0
46	DF	(Russia) RUS	Artyom Mamin	1	0	0	0	1	0	0	0	0	0
47	MF	(Russia) RUS	Roman Zobnin	33	1	25+1	1	0+1	0	2	0	4	0
54	MF	(Russia) RUS	Nail Umyarov	5	0	2+3	0	0	0	0	0	0	0
56	DF	(Russia) RUS	Ilya Gaponov	5	0	5	0	0	0	0	0	0	0
57	GK	(Russia) RUS	Aleksandr Selikhov	6	0	5	0	1	0	0	0	0	0
66	FW	(Liberia) LBR	Sylvanus Nimely	1	0	0+1	0	0	0	0	0	0	0
88	MF	(Russia) RUS	Aleksandr Tashayev	24	0	10+7	0	1+2	0	1	0	1+2	0
92	DF	(Russia) RUS	Nikolai Rasskazov	25	1	16	1	3	0	0+1	0	5	0
94	MF	(Algeria) ALG	Sofiane Hanni	27	4	15+3	1	3+1	2	0	0	3+2	1
98	GK	(Russia) RUS	Aleksandr Maksimenko	31	0	22+1	0	1	0	2	0	5	0
Players away from the club on loan:
7	MF	(Georgia (country)) GEO	Jano Ananidze	3	0	0+1	0	0+1	0	0	0	0+1	0
40	MF	(Russia) RUS	Artyom Timofeyev	15	0	1+6	0	3	0	0+1	0	2+2	0
99	FW	(Brazil) BRA	Pedro Rocha	5	0	1	0	0+2	0	0	0	1+1	0
Players who left Spartak Moscow during the season:
3	DF	(Serbia) SRB	Marko Petković	6	0	3+2	0	1	0	0	0	0	0
10	FW	(Netherlands) NED	Quincy Promes	7	2	5	1	0	0	2	1	0	0
19	MF	(Russia) RUS	Aleksandr Samedov	12	0	4+4	0	1	0	0+1	0	0+2	0
26	MF	(Finland) FIN	Roman Eremenko	7	0	1+3	0	1	0	0	0	1+1	0
71	MF	(Bulgaria) BUL	Ivelin Popov	20	1	6+6	0	0+2	0	1	0	2+3	1
83	MF	(Russia) RUS	Vladislav Panteleyev	2	0	0+1	0	1	0	0	0	0	0

=== Goal scorers ===
Place	Position	Nation	Number	Name	Premier League	Russian Cup	Champions League	Europa League	Total
1	FW	(Cape Verde)	9	Zé Luís	10	1	0	3	14
2	FW	(Brazil)	12	Luiz Adriano	6	0	0	1	7
3	MF	(Paraguay)	25	Lorenzo Melgarejo	3	0	0	2	5
4	MF	(Algeria)	94	Sofiane Hanni	1	2	0	1	4
5	MF	(Russia)	8	Denis Glushakov	3	0	0	0	3
5	MF	(Brazil)	11	Fernando	3	0	0	0	3
7	DF	(Russia)	14	Georgi Dzhikiya	2	0	0	0	2
7	FW	(Netherlands)	10	Quincy Promes	1	0	1	0	2
9	DF	(France)	2	Samuel Gigot	1	0	0	0	1
9	MF	(Russia)	22	Mikhail Ignatov	1	0	0	0	1
9	MF	(Russia)	40	Artyom Timofeyev	1	0	0	0	1
9	MF	(Russia)	23	Dmitri Kombarov	1	0	0	0	1
9	MF	(Russia)	47	Roman Zobnin	1	0	0	0	1
9	DF	(Russia)	92	Nikolai Rasskazov	1	0	0	0	1
9	MF	(Russia)	7	Ayaz Guliyev	1	0	0	0	1
9	MF	(Bulgaria)	71	Ivelin Popov	0	0	1	0	1
9				Own goal	0	0	0	1	1
				TOTALS	36	3	2	8	49

=== Clean sheets ===
Place	Position	Nation	Number	Name	Premier League	Russian Cup	Champions League	Europa League	Total
1	GK	(Russia)	98	Aleksandr Maksimenko	9	0	1	1	11
2	GK	(Russia)	32	Artyom Rebrov	0	2	0	0	2
3	GK	(Russia)	57	Aleksandr Selikhov	1	0	0	0	1
				TOTALS	10	2	1	1	14

=== Disciplinary record ===
Number	Nation	Position	Name	Premier League		Russian Cup		Champions League		Europa League		Total	
Number	Nation	Position	Name	Yellow card	Red card	Yellow card	Red card	Yellow card	Red card	Yellow card	Red card	Yellow card	Red card
2	(France)	DF	Samuel Gigot	1	0	0	0	1	0	0	0	2	0
6	(Brazil)	DF	Ayrton Lucas	2	0	0	0	0	0	0	0	2	0
7	(Russia)	MF	Ayaz Guliyev	7	0	0	0	0	0	0	0	7	0
8	(Russia)	MF	Denis Glushakov	2	0	1	0	0	0	1	0	4	0
9	(Cape Verde)	FW	Zé Luís	6	0	0	0	0	0	2	0	8	0
11	(Brazil)	MF	Fernando	4	0	0	0	2	0	3	0	9	0
12	(Brazil)	FW	Luiz Adriano	4	0	0	0	0	1	0	0	4	1
14	(Russia)	DF	Georgi Dzhikiya	4	0	0	0	1	0	3	0	8	0
16	(Italy)	DF	Salvatore Bocchetti	5	0	0	0	0	0	1	0	6	0
23	(Russia)	MF	Dmitri Kombarov	1	0	1	0	0	0	0	0	2	0
25	(Paraguay)	MF	Lorenzo Melgarejo	3	0	1	0	0	0	1	0	5	0
27	(Russia)	MF	Aleksandr Lomovitskiy	2	0	1	0	1	0	2	0	6	0
29	(Russia)	DF	Ilya Kutepov	4	0	2	0	0	0	1	0	7	0
37	(Russia)	FW	Georgi Melkadze	2	0	0	0	0	0	0	0	2	0
38	(Russia)	DF	Andrey Yeshchenko	2	0	0	0	0	0	0	0	2	0
39	(Russia)	DF	Pavel Maslov	0	0	1	0	0	0	0	0	1	0
47	(Russia)	MF	Roman Zobnin	6	0	1	0	2	0	0	0	9	0
56	(Russia)	DF	Ilya Gaponov	1	0	0	0	0	0	0	0	1	0
88	(Russia)	MF	Aleksandr Tashayev	3	0	1	0	0	0	0	0	4	0
92	(Russia)	DF	Nikolai Rasskazov	2	1	1	0	0	0	2	0	5	1
94	(Algeria)	MF	Sofiane Hanni	4	0	0	0	0	0	0	0	4	0
Players away on loan:
40	(Russia)	MF	Artyom Timofeyev	0	0	1	0	0	0	0	0	1	0
Players who left Spartak Moscow during the season:
3	(Serbia)	DF	Marko Petković	1	0	0	0	0	0	0	0	1	0
10	(Netherlands)	FW	Quincy Promes	1	0	0	0	0	0	0	0	1	0
19	(Russia)	MF	Aleksandr Samedov	1	0	0	0	0	0	0	0	1	0
71	(Bulgaria)	MF	Ivelin Popov	3	0	0	0	0	0	1	0	4	0
			TOTALS	72	1	11	0	7	1	17	0	107	2
