= Gaponov =

Russian surname

Gaponov, feminine: Gaponova is a Russian patronymic surname derived from the name Gapon. Notable people with the surname include:

- Andrey Gaponov-Grekhov, Soviet and Russian physicist
- Ganna Gaponova or Hanna Haponova, Ukrainian table tennis player
- Ilya Gaponov, Russian footballer
- Oleg Gaponov, musician from Zazerkalie (band)

== See also ==
- Gaponenko
