= Kuncewicz family =

Polish-Ruthenian gentry family

Kuncewicz
- Łabędź
- Current region: Ukraine, Belarus
- Members: Josaphat Kuntsevych; Piotr Kuncewicz

Kuncewicz is a Polish-Ruthenian gentry family, like many other Szlachta houses of the Kingdom of Poland and the Duchy of Ruthenia, later prominent in Polish history, science, and arts. They are descended from Jakub Kuncewicz (16th century – 1523).

The family used the Łabędź Coat of Arms.

== Notable members ==
- Jozafat Kuncewicz, Polish-Lithuanian monk
- Nikolay Frantsevich Kuntsevich, Russian musician
- Piotr Kuncewicz, Polish writer

== See also ==
- Poraj Coat of Arms
- Jelita Coat of Arms
- Łabędź Coat of Arms
- The Snow Queen
- History of Christianity in Ukraine
