= Gaponenko =

Gaponenko or Haponenko (Ukrainian: Гапоненко) is a Ukrainian surname. Notable people with the surname include:

- Inna Gaponenko (born 1976), Ukrainian chess player
- Marjana Gaponenko (born 1981), German writer

== See also ==
- Gaponov
