= Fernando (footballer, born 1992) =

Brazilian footballer (born 1992)

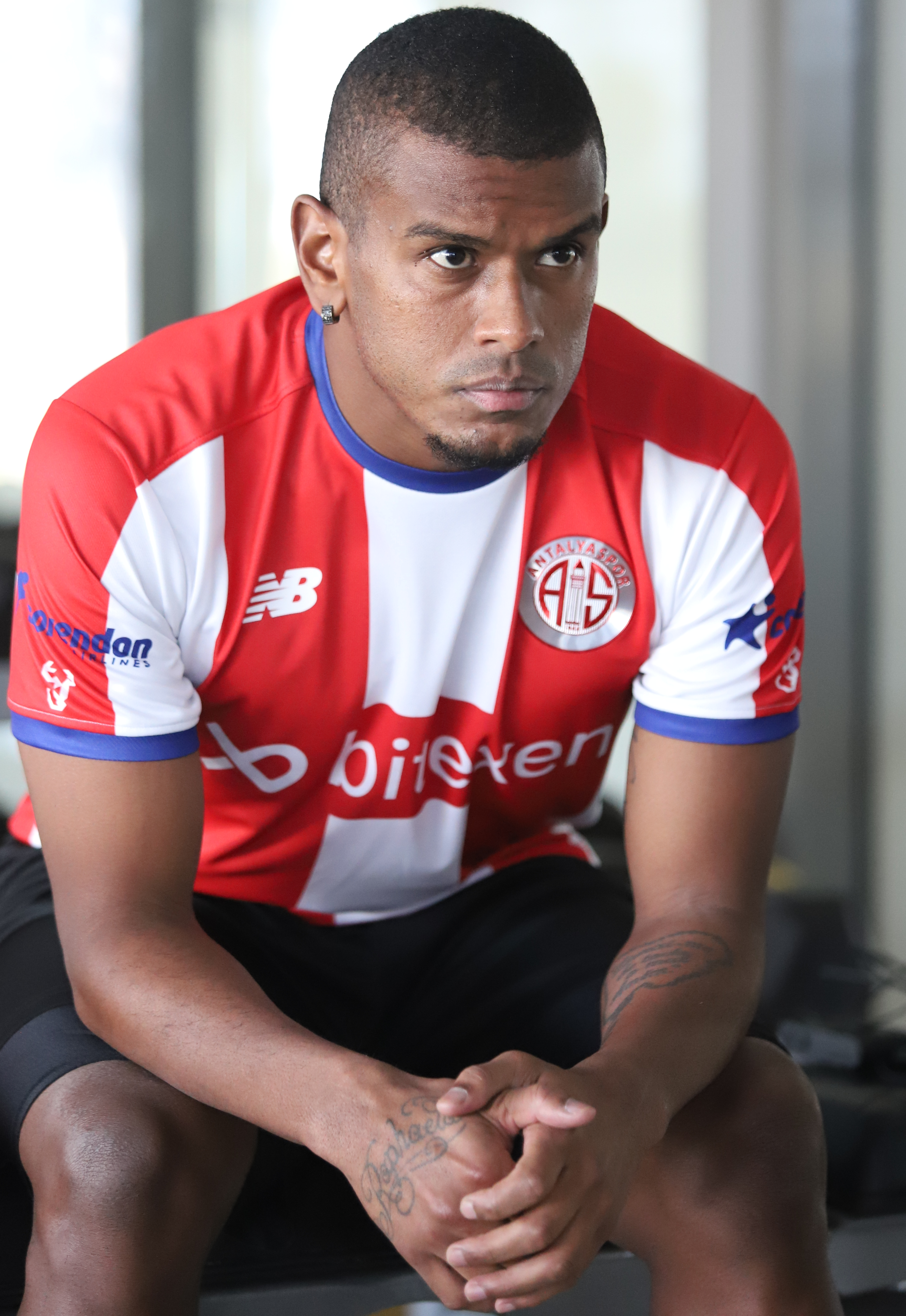
- Fernando in 2022

Personal information
- Full name: Fernando Lucas Martins
- Date of birth: 3 March 1992 (age 34)
- Place of birth: Erechim, Brazil
- Height: 1.75 m (5 ft 9 in)
- Position: Defensive midfielder

Team information
- Current team: Gulf United
- Number: 7

Youth career
- 2001–2009: Grêmio

Senior career*
Years	Team	Apps	(Gls)
2009–2013	Grêmio	69	(2)
2013–2015	Shakhtar Donetsk	27	(2)
2015–2016	Sampdoria	35	(4)
2016–2019	Spartak Moscow	78	(11)
2019–2021	Beijing Sinobo Guoan	18	(3)
2022–2023	Antalyaspor	47	(9)
2023–2026	Al-Jazira	28	(3)
2026–	Gulf United	4	(0)

International career^{‡}
2009	Brazil U17	3	(0)
2011	Brazil U20	15	(0)
2012–2013	Brazil	8	(0)
Medal record
Men's football
Representing Brazil
FIFA Confederations Cup
Winner	2013 Brazil
- * Club domestic league appearances and goals as of 18 September 2026 ‡ National team caps and goals as of 20:36, 22 June 2013 (UTC)

Fernando Lucas Martins (born 3 March 1992), more commonly known as Fernando, is a Brazilian professional footballer who plays as defensive midfielder for UAE First Division League club Gulf United.

== Club career ==
=== Shakhtar Donetsk ===
On 13 June 2013, Fernando signed a five-year contract with Shakhtar Donetsk. The transfer fee was reported to be €11 million.

=== Sampdoria ===
On 6 July 2015, Fernando was signed by Serie A club U.C. Sampdoria for €8 million. He made 33 league appearances, scoring four goals, for the club.

=== Spartak Moscow ===
On 19 July 2016, Sampdoria confirmed that Fernando had been sold to Russian club Spartak Moscow for around €12 million.

=== Beijing Sinobo Guoan ===
On 30 July 2019, Spartak Moscow confirmed that Fernando left for Chinese Super League side Beijing Guoan. Beijing announced that he joined the team on loan a day later to help provide cover for sidelined Jonathan Viera.

=== Antalyaspor ===
On 17 January 2022, Fernando signed with Turkish club Antalyaspor.

=== Al Jazira ===
On 5 August 2023, Fernando signed with Emirati club Al-Jazira.

== International career ==
In 2012, Fernando was called up by Brazil for matches against Iraq on 12 October and Japan on 16 October.

Fernando was part of the 23 players called by coach Luiz Felipe Scolari to play in the 2013 FIFA Confederations Cup on home soil.

== Personal life ==
Fernando became known for the "Robson case", in which he asked his driver Robson Oliveira to take a methadone-based medicine for his father-in-law in Russia, in February 2019. However, the medicine is prohibited by Russian law, and the driver was arrested for international drug trafficking. Fernando never helped the driver. Facing a maximum of 12 years, Oliveira was sentenced to three years in prison in December 2020, followed by deportation.

== Career statistics ==
=== Club ===
As of match played 2 June 2024

Appearances and goals by club, season and competition
Club	Season	League			State league		Cup		Continental		Other		Total	
Club	Season	Division	Apps	Goals	Apps	Goals	Apps	Goals	Apps	Goals	Apps	Goals	Apps	Goals
Grêmio	2009	Série A	1	0	—		0	0	0	0	—		1	0
Grêmio	2010	Série A	13	0	6 (Note: Appearances in the Campeonato Gaúcho)	0	0	0	0	0	—		19	0
Grêmio	2011	Série A	22	1	7	0	0	0	4	0	—		33	1
Grêmio	2012	Série A	32	1	19	4	0	0	6	0	—		57	5
Grêmio	2013	Série A	1	0	8	1	0	0	9	1	—		18	2
Grêmio	Total		69	2	40	5	0	0	19	1	—		128	8
Shakhtar Donetsk	2013–14	Ukrainian Premier League	14	1	—		3	1	5	0	—		22	2
Shakhtar Donetsk	2014–15	Ukrainian Premier League	13	1	—		4	0	7	0	1 (Note: Appearance in the Ukrainian Super Cup)	0	25	1
Shakhtar Donetsk	Total		27	2	—		7	1	12	0	1	0	47	3
Sampdoria	2015–16	Serie A	35	4	—		1	0	2	0	—		38	4
Spartak Moscow	2016–17	Russian Premier League	28	3	—		1	0	1	0	—		30	3
Spartak Moscow	2017–18	Russian Premier League	27	5	—		3	0	7	1	1 (Note: Appearance in the Russian Super Cup)	0	38	6
Spartak Moscow	2018–19	Russian Premier League	20	3	—		1	0	6	0	—		27	3
Spartak Moscow	2019–20	Russian Premier League	3	0	—		0	0	—		—		3	0
Spartak Moscow	Total		78	11	—		5	0	14	1	1	0	98	12
Beijing Guoan (loan)	2019	Chinese Super League	7	0	—		0	0	—		—		7	0
Beijing Guoan	2020	Chinese Super League	11	3	—		1	0	7	1	—		19	4
Beijing Guoan	Total		18	3	—		1	0	7	1	—		26	4
Antalyaspor	2021–22	Süper Lig	17	4	—		1	0	—		—		18	4
Antalyaspor	2022–23	Süper Lig	30	5	—		1	0	—		—		31	5
Antalyaspor	Total		47	9	—		2	0	—		—		49	9
Al-Jazira	2023–24	UAE Pro League	24	1	—		2	1	—		4 (Note: Appearances in the UAE League Cup)	2	30	4
Career total			298	32	40	5	18	2	54	3	6	2	406	44

=== International ===
As of match played 10 September 2013

Appearances and goals by national team and year
National team	Year	Apps	Goals
Brazil	2012	1	0
Brazil	2013	7	0
Total		8	0

== Honours ==
Grêmio

- Campeonato Gaúcho: 2010

Shakhtar Donetsk

- Ukrainian League: 2013–14
- Ukrainian Super Cup: 2014

Spartak Moscow

- Russian Premier League: 2016–17
- Russian Super Cup: 2017

Brazil U17

- South American Under-17 Football Championship: 2009

Brazil U20

- South American Youth Championship: 2011
- FIFA U-20 World Cup: 2011

Brazil

- FIFA Confederations Cup: 2013
