= Hapon =

Hapon is a surname. Notable people with the name include:

- Volodymyr Hapon (born 1979), Ukrainian footballer
- Yevhen Hapon, Ukrainian musician performing as Knjaz Varggoth

== See also ==
- Gapon (disambiguation), alternative transliteration
