= Nick Rock'n'Roll =

Russian punk musician

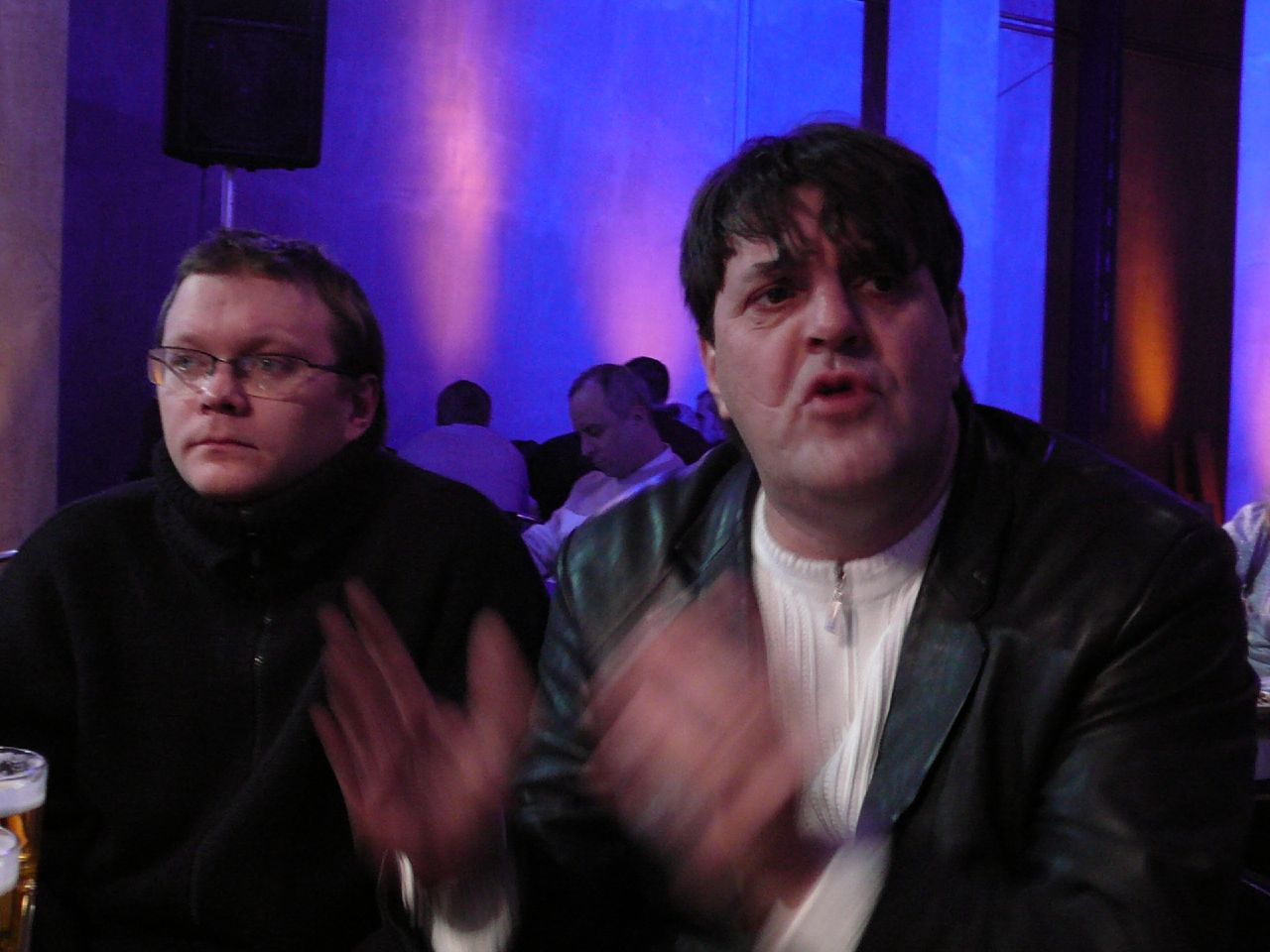
Nick Rock'n'Roll (right)

Nick Rock'n'Roll (real name Nikolay Frantsevich Kuntsevich, Russian: Николай Францевич Кунцевич; born 7 August 1960 in Orenburg) is a Russian punk-rocker. He is the lead singer of Masochist and Nick Rock'n'Roll & Trite Dushi.

== See also ==
- Tony Blackplait
- Kuncewicz
- Zazerkalie
