= Zé Luís =

Cape Verdean footballer (born 1991)

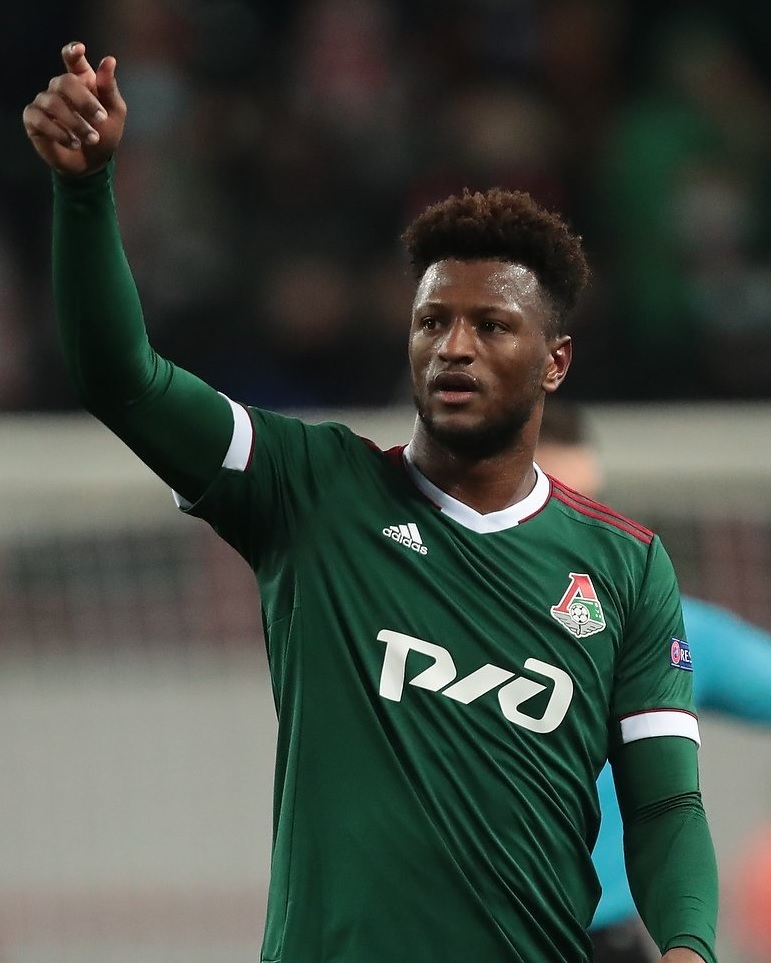
- Zé Luís with Lokomotiv Moscow in 2020

Personal information
- Full name: José Luís Mendes Andrade
- Date of birth: 24 January 1991 (age 35)
- Place of birth: Fogo, Cape Verde
- Height: 1.84 m (6 ft 0 in)
- Position: Striker

Youth career
- 2007: Académica Fogo
- 2008: Batuque
- 2009: Gil Vicente

Senior career*
Years	Team	Apps	(Gls)
2009–2011	Gil Vicente	27	(14)
2011–2013	Braga B	15	(4)
2011–2015	Braga	35	(12)
2012	→ Gil Vicente (loan)	13	(4)
2013–2014	→ Videoton (loan)	26	(9)
2015–2019	Spartak Moscow	86	(25)
2019–2020	Porto	20	(7)
2020–2022	Lokomotiv Moscow	11	(1)
2022	Al Taawoun	5	(0)
2022–2023	Hatayspor	14	(2)
2023–2024	Farense	15	(2)
2024–2025	AVS	25	(3)

International career
2010–2019	Cape Verde	19	(3)
Medal record
Men's football
Representing Cape Verde
Lusofonia Games
Gold medal – first place	Lisbon 2009	Team
- * Club domestic league appearances and goals as of 20 May 2025

José Luís Mendes Andrade (born 24 January 1991), known as Zé Luís, is a Cape Verdean professional footballer who plays as a striker.

He spent most of his career in Portugal, playing 108 Primeira Liga games and scoring 28 goals for Gil Vicente, Braga, Porto, Farense and AVS, winning a league title with Porto in 2020. He also competed in the Russian Premier League with Spartak Moscow and Lokomotiv Moscow, picking up a winners' medal with the former in the 2016–17 season.

== Club career ==
=== Gil Vicente and Braga ===
Born in Fogo, Zé Luís began his professional career at the age 18 with his last youth club, Gil Vicente FC. In his first season he played only five Segunda Liga games – his debut coming on 29 November 2009 in a 0–3 home loss against G.D. Chaves – but managed to score four goals.

In 2010–11, under new manager Paulo Alves, Zé Luís netted ten times for the Barcelos side as they achieved promotion to the Primeira Liga after a five-year absence, as champions. On 2 June 2011, he signed for S.C. Braga on a five-year contract.

Zé Luís served two loan spells during his tenure in Minho, spending three months with former club Gil and one full season with Videoton FC in Hungary; he also featured regularly for Braga B in the second tier. In between, he played for the main squad in the 2013 Taça da Liga final, as a substitute in a 1–0 win over FC Porto at the Estádio Cidade de Coimbra. On 7 April 2015, he scored his first career hat-trick, helping defeat Rio Ave F.C. 3–0 at home in the semi-finals of the Taça de Portugal (4–1 on aggregate). He battled for position with Eder during the campaign, finishing with 11 goals in all competitions.

=== Spartak Moscow ===
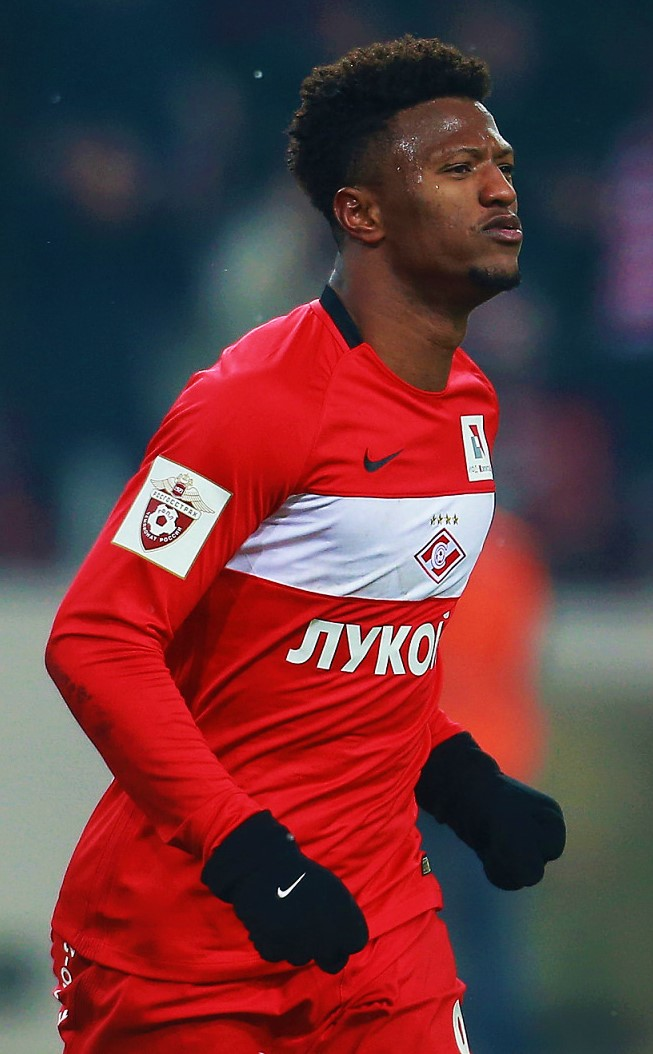
Zé Luís in action for Spartak in November 2016

On 7 July 2015, Zé Luís joined Russian Premier League club FC Spartak Moscow. He scored five times in the 2016–17 season, as his team won the domestic championship for the 22nd time in history.

In July 2017, Zé Luís extended his link to Spartak until 2021. In the same month, he won the Super Cup in a 2–1 victory over city rivals FC Lokomotiv Moscow. During the 2018–19 campaign, he contributed ten league goals – 14 in all competitions – to a fifth-place finish.

=== Porto ===
On 2 July 2019, Spartak announced that the transfer of Zé Luís to Porto had been agreed on, and a four-year contract was signed three days later. He scored three times in only his second league appearance, a 4–0 home rout of Vitória de Setúbal.

Zé Luís scored seven league goals in his only season at the Estádio do Dragão for the eventual champions, and ten overall as the team secured the double.

=== Later career ===
On 6 October 2020, Zé Luís returned to the Russian capital, when he joined Lokomotiv Moscow on a three-year deal for a €5 million fee. On 13 January 2022, his contract was terminated by mutual consent.

Zé Luís signed a six-month deal with Al Taawoun FC of the Saudi Professional League on 8 February 2022. He played nine games for the club and scored once on 14 April, in the first minute of the second half of a 3–0 home win over Sepahan S.C. in the AFC Champions League group stage.

On 7 September 2022, Zé Luís signed a one-season contract with Hatayspor in Turkey. His first Süper Lig goal came on 24 October, equalising a 2–1 home victory against Beşiktaş JK. The Antakya-based side withdrew from the season in February after an earthquake.

Zé Luís joined S.C. Farense (recently promoted to the Portuguese top tier) on 29 August 2023, on a one-year deal. In September 2024, the 33-year-old moved to AVS Futebol SAD also in the main division.

== International career ==
Zé Luís made his debut for Cape Verde on 24 May 2010, playing one minute in a friendly in Covilhã with Portugal, who were preparing for the FIFA World Cup in South Africa. He was selected by manager Lúcio Antunes for the squad that appeared at the 2013 Africa Cup of Nations, but withdrew for personal reasons.

Zé Luís scored his first goal for the national team on 6 September 2014, in a 3–1 away win against Niger for the 2015 Africa Cup of Nations qualifiers. His second came in the 2–1 home victory over Zambia for the same competition four days later, as the Blue Sharks eventually reached the finals in Equatorial Guinea. However, he was not picked for the tournament.

On 10 October 2019, Zé Luís scored the equaliser as Cape Verde came from behind to win 2–1 against Togo in an exhibition game in Fos-sur-Mer, France. It was his first appearance for over two years, and his first goal in more than five.

== Career statistics ==
=== Club ===
As of match played 22 April 2024

Club	Season	League			National cup (Note: Includes Taça de Portugal, Magyar Kupa, Russian Cup, King's Cup, Turkish Cup)		League cup (Note: Includes Taça da Liga, Ligakupa)		Continental		Other		Total	
Club	Season	Division	Apps	Goals	Apps	Goals	Apps	Goals	Apps	Goals	Apps	Goals	Apps	Goals
Gil Vicente	2009–10	Liga de Honra	5	4	0	0	0	0	—		—		5	4
Gil Vicente	2010–11	Liga de Honra	22	10	0	0	5	2	—		—		27	12
Gil Vicente	Total		27	14	0	0	5	2	—		—		32	16
Braga B	2012–13	Segunda Liga	15	4	—		—		—		—		15	4
Braga	2012–13	Primeira Liga	15	4	1	1	2	0	5 (Note: Appearances in UEFA Champions League)	0	—		23	5
Braga	2014–15	Primeira Liga	20	8	2	3	2	0	—		—		24	11
Braga	Total		35	12	3	4	4	0	5	0	—		47	16
Gil Vicente (loan)	2011–12	Primeira Liga	13	4	0	0	3	1	—		—		16	5
Videoton (loan)	2013–14	Nemzeti Bajnokság I	26	9	3	1	9	5	—		—		38	15
Spartak Moscow	2015–16	Russian Premier League	24	8	1	2	—		—		—		25	10
Spartak Moscow	2016–17	Russian Premier League	21	5	1	0	—		2 (Note: Appearances in UEFA Europa League)	0	—		24	5
Spartak Moscow	2017–18	Russian Premier League	16	2	2	2	—		5 (Note: Three appearances and two goals in UEFA Champions League, two appearances in UEFA Europa League)	2	1 (Note: Appearance in Russian Super Cup)	0	24	6
Spartak Moscow	2018–19	Russian Premier League	25	10	3	1	—		8 (Note: Two appearances in UEFA Champions League, six appearances and three goals in UEFA Europa League)	3	—		36	14
Spartak Moscow	Total		86	25	7	5	0	0	15	5	1	0	109	35
Porto	2019–20	Primeira Liga	19	7	3	2	1	0	8 (Note: Two appearances and one goal in UEFA Champions League, six appearances in UEFA Europa League)	1	—		31	10
Porto	2020–21	Primeira Liga	1	0	0	0	0	0	0	0	0	0	1	0
Porto	Total		20	7	3	2	1	0	8	1	0	0	32	10
Lokomotiv Moscow	2020–21	Russian Premier League	8	1	0	0	—		5	0	0	0	13	1
Lokomotiv Moscow	2021–22	Russian Premier League	3	0	0	0	—		—		—		3	0
Lokomotiv Moscow	Total		11	1	0	0	—		5	0	0	0	16	1
Al Taawoun	2021–22	Saudi Pro League	5	0	1	0	—		2 (Note: Appearances in AFC Champions League)	1	—		8	1
Hatayspor	2022–23	Süper Lig	14	2	1	0	—		—		—		15	2
Farense	2023–24	Primeira Liga	15	2	1	0	2	1	—		—		18	3
Career total			267	80	19	12	24	9	35	7	1	0	346	108

=== International ===
Cape Verde
Year	Apps	Goals
2010	2	0
2011	0	0
2012	6	0
2013	0	0
2014	4	2
2015	1	0
2016	2	0
2017	2	0
2018	0	0
2019	2	1
Total	19	3

Scores and results list Cape Verde's goal tally first, score column indicates score after each Zé Luís goal.

Goal	Date	Venue	Opponent	Score	Result	Competition
1.	6 September 2014	Stade Général Seyni Kountché, Niamey, Niger	Niger	3–0	3–1	2015 Africa Cup of Nations qualification
2.	10 September 2014	Estádio Nacional, Praia, Cape Verde	Zambia	1–0	2–1	2015 Africa Cup of Nations qualification
3.	10 October 2019	Stade Parsemain, Fos-sur-Mer, France	Togo	1–1	2–1	Friendly

== Honours ==
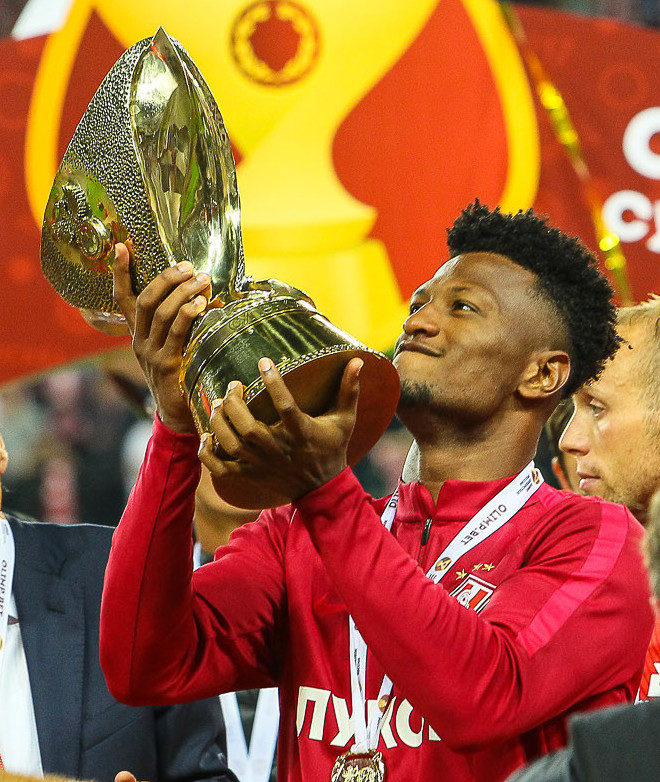
Zé Luís with the Russian Super Cup in 2017

Gil Vicente

- Segunda Liga: 2010–11

Braga

- Taça da Liga: 2012–13

Spartak Moscow

- Russian Premier League: 2016–17
- Russian Super Cup: 2017

Porto

- Primeira Liga: 2019–20
- Taça de Portugal: 2019–20

Cape Verde

- Lusofonia Games: 2009

Individual

- Russian Premier League Player of the Month: October 2016
- Russian Premier League Top 33 Players of the Season: 2016–17 (right forward Nº2), 2018–19 (left forward Nº3)
- Primeira Liga Forward of the Month: August 2019
- Primeira Liga Goal of the Month: December 2019
- Primeira Liga Goal of the Season: 2019–20
