= Ilya Gaponov =

Russian footballer

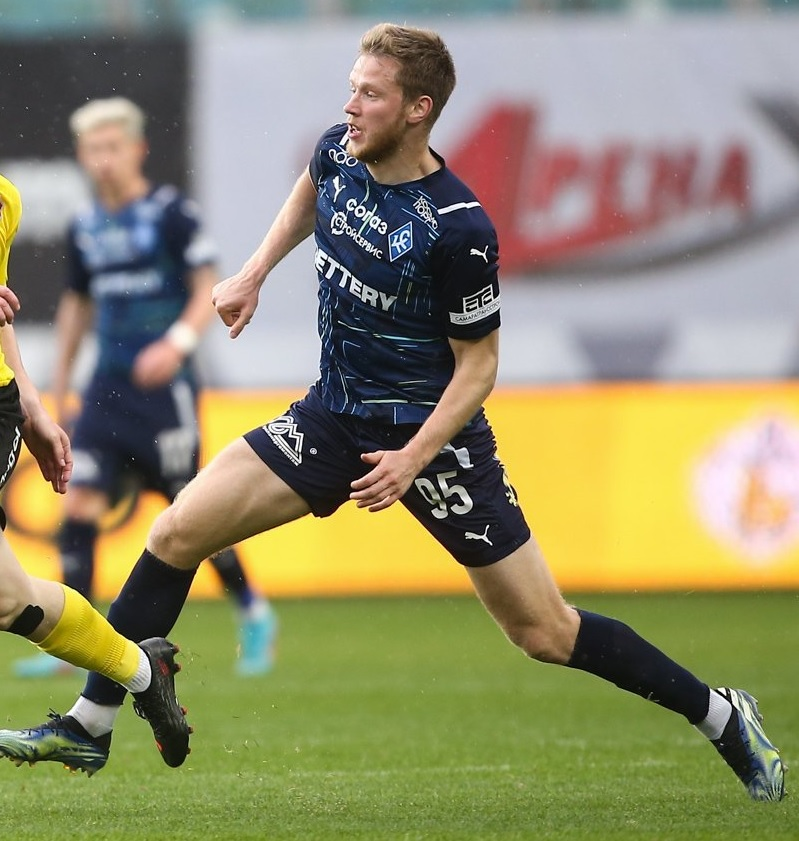
- Gaponov with Krylia Sovetov in 2022

Personal information
- Full name: Ilya Sergeyevich Gaponov
- Date of birth: 25 October 1997 (age 29)
- Place of birth: Oryol, Russia
- Height: 1.85 m (6 ft 1 in)
- Position: Centre-back

Team information
- Current team: Sokol Saratov
- Number: 95

Youth career
- –2009: DYuSSh-3 Oryol
- 2009–2010: DYuSSh Krylya Sovetov Moscow
- 2010: Lokomotiv Moscow
- 2010–2011: DYuSSh-3 Oryol
- 2011: Rusichi Oryol
- 2011–2013: UOR Master-Saturn Yegoryevsk
- 2013–2015: Strogino Moscow

Senior career*
Years	Team	Apps	(Gls)
2015–2018	Strogino Moscow	58	(0)
2018–2022	Spartak-2 Moscow	59	(1)
2018–2022	Spartak Moscow	20	(0)
2022	→ Krylia Sovetov Samara (loan)	6	(0)
2022–2025	Krylia Sovetov Samara	38	(1)
2025–2026	Fakel Voronezh	10	(1)
2026–	Sokol Saratov	8	(0)

International career^{‡}
2018	Russia U-21	1	(0)
- * Club domestic league appearances and goals as of 15 November 2026 ‡ National team caps and goals as of 7 September 2018

Ilya Sergeyevich Gaponov (Russian: Илья Сергеевич Гапонов; born 25 October 1997) is a Russian football player who plays as a centre-back for Sokol Saratov.

== Club career ==
He made his debut in the Russian Professional Football League for Strogino Moscow on 20 July 2015 in a game against Dolgoprudny.

He made his Russian Premier League debut for Spartak Moscow on 25 April 2019 in a game against Arsenal Tula, as a starter.

On 22 February 2022, Gaponov joined Krylia Sovetov Samara on loan. On 30 May 2022, Gaponov moved to Krylia Sovetov on a permanent basis and signed a three-year contract.

== Career statistics ==
As of match played 16 May 2026

Appearances and goals by club, season and competition
Club	Season	League			Cup		Continental		Total	
Club	Season	Division	Apps	Goals	Apps	Goals	Apps	Goals	Apps	Goals
Strogino Moscow	2015–16	Russian Second League	14	0	0	0	–		14	0
Strogino Moscow	2016–17	Russian Second League	20	0	1	0	–		21	0
Strogino Moscow	2017–18	Russian Second League	24	0	1	0	–		25	0
Strogino Moscow	Total		58	0	2	0	0	0	60	0
Spartak-2 Moscow	2018–19	Russian First League	27	1	–		–		27	1
Spartak-2 Moscow	2019–20	Russian First League	14	0	–		–		14	0
Spartak-2 Moscow	2020–21	Russian First League	12	0	–		–		12	0
Spartak-2 Moscow	2021–22	Russian First League	6	0	–		–		6	0
Spartak-2 Moscow	Total		59	1	0	0	0	0	59	1
Spartak Moscow	2018–19	Russian Premier League	5	0	0	0	0	0	5	0
Spartak Moscow	2019–20	Russian Premier League	4	0	1	0	0	0	5	0
Spartak Moscow	2020–21	Russian Premier League	11	0	2	0	–		13	0
Spartak Moscow	2021–22	Russian Premier League	0	0	0	0	0	0	0	0
Spartak Moscow	Total		20	0	3	0	0	0	23	0
Krylia Sovetov Samara (loan)	2021–22	Russian Premier League	6	0	–		–		6	0
Krylia Sovetov Samara	2022–23	Russian Premier League	16	1	6	1	–		22	2
Krylia Sovetov Samara	2023–24	Russian Premier League	13	0	1	0	–		14	0
Krylia Sovetov Samara	2024–25	Russian Premier League	9	0	6	1	–		15	1
Krylia Sovetov Samara	Total		38	1	13	2	0	0	51	3
Fakel Voronezh	2025–26	Russian First League	10	1	3	0	–		13	1
Career total			191	3	21	2	0	0	212	5
