= Dmitri Mitroga =

Russian footballer

Personal information
- Full name: Dmitri Sergeyevich Mitroga
- Date of birth: 2 December 2000 (age 25)
- Place of birth: Vyshny Volochyok, Tver Oblast, Russia
- Height: 1.65 m (5 ft 5 in)
- Position: Midfielder

Youth career
- DYuSSh-2 Vyshny Volochyok
- –2019: Spartak Moscow

Senior career*
Years	Team	Apps	(Gls)
2018–2019	Spartak-2 Moscow	2	(0)
2020	Gomel	4	(0)

International career
2016	Russia U16	6	(0)
2016	Russia U17	5	(0)
- * Club domestic league appearances and goals

Dmitri Sergeyevich Mitroga (Russian: Дмитрий Сергеевич Митрога; born 2 December 2000) is a Russian former footballer.

== Club career ==
He made his debut in the Russian Football National League for FC Spartak-2 Moscow on 8 September 2018 in a game against FC Nizhny Novgorod.
