= Nikita Bakalyuk =

Russian football player

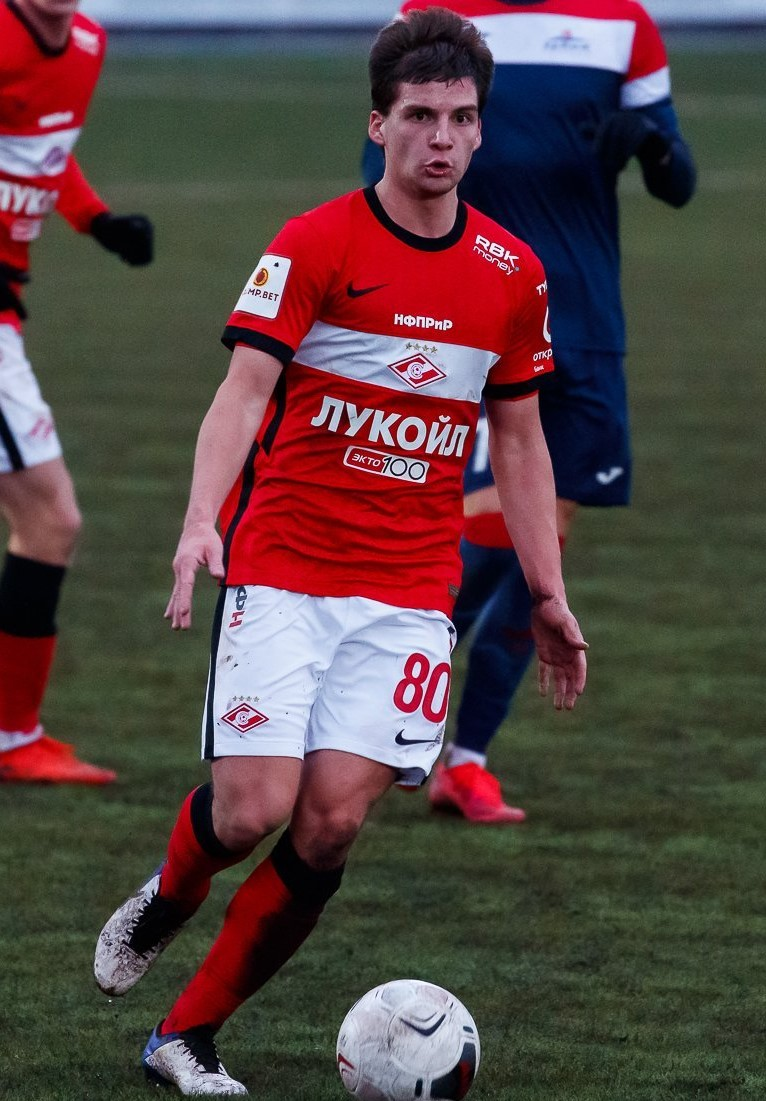

Personal information
- Full name: Nikita Sergeyevich Bakalyuk
- Date of birth: 3 April 2001 (age 25)
- Place of birth: Ivanteyevka, Russia
- Height: 1.75 m (5 ft 9 in)
- Position: Midfielder

Youth career
- –2015: TsDYuS Mytishchi
- 2015–2021: Spartak Moscow

Senior career*
Years	Team	Apps	(Gls)
2018–2022	Spartak-2 Moscow	77	(2)
2020–2023	Spartak Moscow	1	(0)
2022–2023	→ Arsenal Tula (loan)	11	(0)
2022–2023	→ Arsenal-2 Tula (loan)	2	(0)
2023–2025	Kuban Krasnodar	29	(1)

International career^{‡}
2017–2018	Russia U-17	6	(0)
2019–2020	Russia U-19	4	(0)
- * Club domestic league appearances and goals as of 17 November 2024 ‡ National team caps and goals as of 11 February 2020

Nikita Sergeyevich Bakalyuk (Russian: Никита Сергеевич Бакалюк; born 3 April 2001) is a Russian football player who plays as a central midfielder.

== Club career ==
He made his debut in the Russian Football National League for Spartak-2 Moscow on 23 September 2018 in a game against SKA-Khabarovsk.

He made his Russian Premier League debut for Spartak Moscow on 15 July 2020 in a game against Akhmat Grozny, replacing Alex Král in the 89th minute.

On 21 June 2022, Bakalyuk was loaned to Arsenal Tula.

Bakalyuk left Spartak on 10 August 2023.
