= Thierno Thioub =

Senegalese footballer

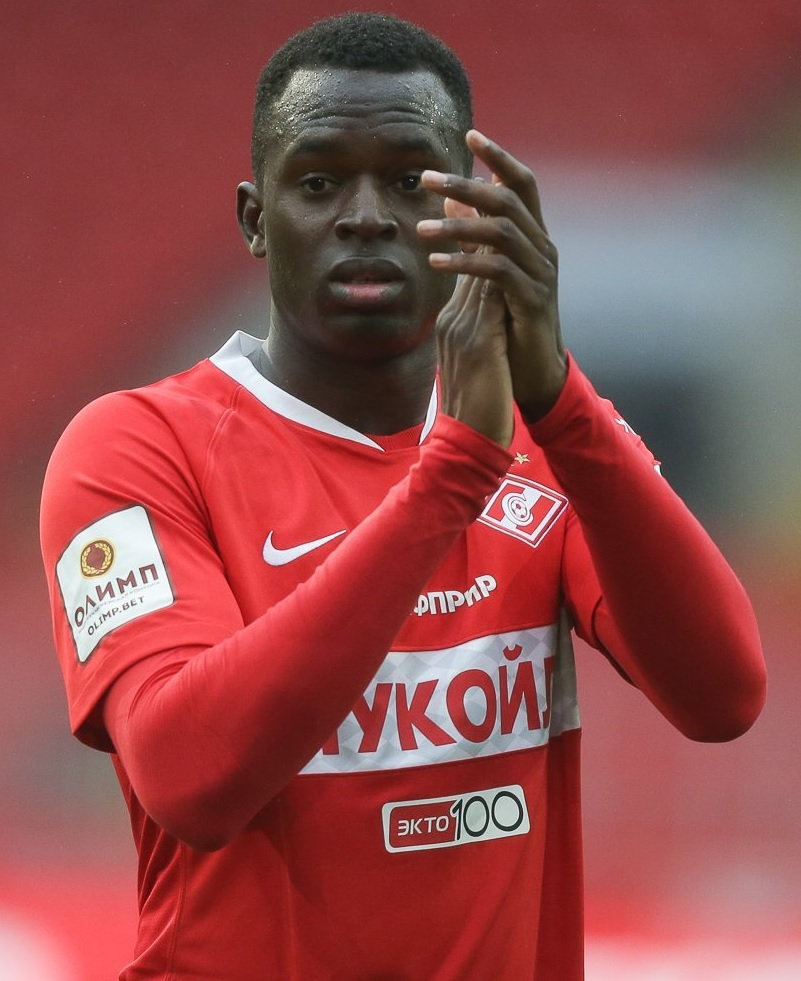
- Thioub with Spartak-2 Moscow in 2019

Personal information
- Date of birth: 1 June 1998 (age 28)
- Place of birth: Tivaouane, Senegal
- Height: 1.94 m (6 ft 4 in)
- Position: Forward

Youth career
- 2019: Spartak Moscow

Senior career*
Years	Team	Apps	(Gls)
–2016	Cayor Foot FC		
2016–2017	Guédiawaye FC		
2017–2018	Stade de Mbour	24	(15)
2018–2020	Spartak-2 Moscow	24	(2)
2020–2022	Pau FC	2	(0)
2022	Novi Pazar	2	(0)
2022–2023	Erzeni	10	(0)
2023	→ Oriku (loan)	11	(1)
- * Club domestic league appearances and goals as of 20 May 2023

Thierno Thioub (born 1 June 1998) is a Senegalese professional footballer who plays as a forward.

== Club career ==
Thioub became second best scorer in the 2017–18 Senegal Premier League with 15 goals for Stade de Mbour.

On 23 August 2018, he signed with the Russian Premier League club FC Spartak Moscow.

He made his debut in the Russian Football National League for FC Spartak-2 Moscow on 26 August 2018 in a game against Zenit-2 Saint Petersburg and scored a last-minute goal after coming on as a substitute in the second half.
