= Piotr Kuncewicz =

Piotr Kuncewicz (19 March 1936 – 9 April 2007) was a Polish writer and Freemason in the Grand Orient of Poland.

== Works ==
- Samotni wobec historii, 1967
- Antyk zmęczonej Europy, 1982, 1988
- Grochowiak, 1976
- Cień ręki, 1977
- W poszukiwaniu codzienności, 1979
- Szumy, 1976
- Dęby kapitolińskie, 1970, 1973
- Zamieć, 1972
- Agonia i nadzieja: T. I. Literatura od 1919 (1993), T. II. Literatura od 1939 (1993), T. III. Poezja polska od 1956, część 1 i 2 (1994)
- Goj patrzy na Żyda, 2000.
- Legenda Europy, 2005
