= 2018–19 Russian Premier League =

27th season of top-tier football league in Russia

Russian Premier League
- Season: 2018–19
- Champions: Zenit Saint Petersburg; 6th title
- Relegated: Anzhi; Yenisey
- Champions League: Zenit Saint Petersburg; Lokomotiv Moscow; Krasnodar
- Europa League: CSKA Moscow; Spartak Moscow; Arsenal
- Matches: 240
- Goals: 542 (2.26 per match)
- Top goalscorer: Fyodor Chalov (15 goals)
- Biggest home win: CSKA Moscow 6–0 Krylia Sovetov
- Biggest away win: Anzhi 0–4 Krasnodar
- Highest scoring: Zenit 5–3 Lokomotiv
- Longest winning run: 5 matches: Zenit (29 Jul–2 Sep)
- Longest unbeaten run: 8 matches: Zenit (29 Jul–30 Sep)
- Longest winless run: 9 matches: Yenisey (27 Aug-present)
- Longest losing run: 6 matches: Anzhi (6 Aug–22 Sep)
- Highest attendance: 61,500; Zenit 3–1 CSKA (12 May 2019)
- Lowest attendance: 1,285; Yenisey 0–0 Arsenal (2 September 2018)
- Total attendance: 4,036,196
- Average attendance: 16,817

The 2018–19 Russian Premier League was the 27th season of the premier football competition in Russia since the dissolution of the Soviet Union and the 17th under the current Russian Premier League name. Lokomotiv Moscow came into the season as the defending champions.

The new logo was presented on 24 July 2018, there was no title sponsor announced for the season.

== Teams ==
As in the previous season, 16 teams will play in the 2018–19 season. After the 2017–18 season, Anzhi Makhachkala, Tosno and SKA-Khabarovsk were relegated to the 2018–19 Russian National Football League. They were replaced by three clubs from the 2017–18 Russian National Football League, Orenburg, Krylya Sovetov Samara, and Yenisey Krasnoyarsk. Orenburg and Krylya Sovetov returned after one season of absence while Yenisey make their debut in the Premier League.

On 13 June 2018, FC Amkar Perm announced that the Russian Football Union recalled their 2018–19 season license, making them ineligible for the Russian Premier League or Russian Football National League. FC Anzhi Makhachkala, which was already licensed for the 2018–19 Premier League before losing in the 2017–18 relegation play-offs, was eligible to stay in the league ahead of the other relegation play-off losing club, FC Tambov. Anzhi re-applied for the Premier League membership on 15 June and was officially re-admitted into the Premier League on 22 June.

=== Venues ===
Zenit Saint Petersburg	Rubin Kazan	Rostov	Krylia Sovetov Samara
Krestovsky Stadium	Kazan Arena	Rostov Arena	Cosmos Arena
Capacity: 67,800	Capacity: 45,093	Capacity: 45,000	Capacity: 44,918
Spartak Moscow	Locations of teams in 2018–19 Russian Premier League Locations of teams in 2018–19 Russian Premier League		Ural Yekaterinburg
Otkritie Arena	Locations of teams in 2018–19 Russian Premier League Locations of teams in 2018–19 Russian Premier League		Central Stadium
Capacity: 44,307	Locations of teams in 2018–19 Russian Premier League Locations of teams in 2018–19 Russian Premier League		Capacity: 35,696
Krasnodar	Locations of teams in 2018–19 Russian Premier League Locations of teams in 2018–19 Russian Premier League		Akhmat Grozny
Krasnodar Stadium	Locations of teams in 2018–19 Russian Premier League Locations of teams in 2018–19 Russian Premier League		Akhmat-Arena
Capacity: 34,291	Locations of teams in 2018–19 Russian Premier League Locations of teams in 2018–19 Russian Premier League		Capacity: 30,597
CSKA Moscow	Locations of teams in 2018–19 Russian Premier League Locations of teams in 2018–19 Russian Premier League		Lokomotiv Moscow
VEB Arena	Locations of teams in 2018–19 Russian Premier League Locations of teams in 2018–19 Russian Premier League		RZD Arena
Capacity: 30,457	Locations of teams in 2018–19 Russian Premier League Locations of teams in 2018–19 Russian Premier League		Capacity: 27,320
Anzhi Makhachkala	Locations of teams in 2018–19 Russian Premier League Locations of teams in 2018–19 Russian Premier League		Yenisey Krasnoyarsk
Anzhi Arena	Locations of teams in 2018–19 Russian Premier League Locations of teams in 2018–19 Russian Premier League		Central Stadium
Capacity: 26,500	Locations of teams in 2018–19 Russian Premier League Locations of teams in 2018–19 Russian Premier League		Capacity: 22,500
Arsenal Tula	Dynamo Moscow	Ufa	Orenburg
Arsenal Stadium	Arena Khimki	Neftyanik Stadium	Gazovik Stadium
Capacity: 20,048	Capacity: 18,636	Capacity: 15,132	Capacity: 7,520

=== Personnel and kits ===
Team	Location	Head coach	Captain	Kit manufacturer	Shirt sponsor
Akhmat	Grozny	(Tajikistan) Rashid Rakhimov	(Russia) Rizvan Utsiyev	(Germany) Adidas	Akhmat Foundation
Anzhi	Makhachkala	(Russia) Magomed Adiyev	(Russia) Guram Tetrashvili	(Germany) Jako	
Arsenal	Tula	(Tajikistan) Igor Cherevchenko	(Russia) Kirill Kombarov	(Germany) Adidas	SPLAV
CSKA	Moscow	(Belarus) Viktor Goncharenko	(Russia) Igor Akinfeev	(England) Umbro	Rosseti
Dynamo	Moscow	(Russia) Dmitri Khokhlov	(Russia) Anton Shunin	(United States) Nike	VTB
Krasnodar	Krasnodar	(Russia) Murad Musayev	(Belarus) Alyaksandr Martynovich	(Germany) Puma	Constell Group
Krylia Sovetov	Samara	(Montenegro) Miodrag Božović	(Russia) Yevgeni Konyukhov	(Germany) Puma	Parimatch
Lokomotiv	Moscow	(Russia) Yuri Semin	(Russia) Igor Denisov	(United States) Under Armour	RZhD
Orenburg	Orenburg	(Russia) Vladimir Fedotov	(Russia) Dmitri Andreyev	(Germany) Adidas	Gazprom Dobycha Orenburg
Rostov	Rostov-on-Don	(Russia) Valeri Karpin	(Moldova) Alexandru Gațcan	(Spain) Joma	TNS Energo
Rubin	Kazan	(Turkmenistan) Kurban Berdyev	(Spain) César Navas	(Germany) Jako	Nizhnekamskneftekhim
Spartak	Moscow	(Russia) Oleg Kononov	(Russia) Denis Glushakov	(United States) Nike	Lukoil
Ufa	Ufa	(Russia) Vadim Evseev	(Russia) Pavel Alikin	(Spain) Joma	Terra Bashkiria
Ural	Yekaterinburg	(Ukraine) Dmytro Parfenov	(Russia) Artyom Fidler	(Spain) Joma	Renova, TMK
Yenisey	Krasnoyarsk	(Russia) Dmitri Alenichev	(Russia) David Yurchenko	(United States) Nike	HOK
Zenit	Saint Petersburg	(Russia) Sergei Semak	(Russia) Aleksandr Anyukov	(United States) Nike	Gazprom

=== Managerial changes ===
Team	Outgoing manager	Manner of departure	Date of vacancy	Position in table	Replaced by	Date of appointment
Zenit	(Italy) Roberto Mancini	Mutual consent	13 May 2018	pre-season	(Russia) Sergei Semak	29 May 2018
Ural	(Russia) Aleksandr Tarkhanov	Moved to the advisor position	21 May 2018	pre-season	(Ukraine) Dmytro Parfenov	21 May 2018
Arsenal	(Montenegro) Miodrag Božović	Contract expired	21 May 2018	pre-season	(Russia) Oleg Kononov	1 June 2018
Ufa	(Russia) Sergei Semak	Mutual consent	29 May 2018	pre-season	(Russia) Sergei Tomarov	13 June 2018
Anzhi	(Belarus) Vadim Skripchenko	Contract expired	31 May 2018	pre-season	(Russia) Magomed Adiyev	4 June 2018
Akhmat	(Russia) Igor Lediakhov	Resigned	2 September 2018	10th	(Azerbaijan) Ruslan İdiqov (caretaker)	2 September 2018
Akhmat	(Azerbaijan) Ruslan İdiqov (caretaker)	Caretaking spell over	5 September 2018	10th	(Tajikistan) Rashid Rakhimov	5 September 2018
Krylia Sovetov	(Russia) Andrey Tikhonov	Fired	5 October 2018	15th	(Montenegro) Miodrag Božović	5 October 2018
Spartak Moscow	(Italy) Massimo Carrera	Fired	23 October 2018	6th	(Spain) Raúl Riancho (caretaker)	23 October 2018
Ufa	(Russia) Sergei Tomarov	Resigned	7 November 2018	15th	(Russia) Dmitri Kirichenko	7 November 2018
Spartak Moscow	(Spain) Raúl Riancho	Caretaking spell over	12 November 2018	9th	(Russia) Oleg Kononov	12 November 2018
Arsenal Tula	(Russia) Oleg Kononov	Mutual consent	12 November 2018	11th	(Tajikistan) Igor Cherevchenko	13 November 2018
Ufa	(Russia) Dmitri Kirichenko	Mutual consent	27 March 2019	15th	(Russia) Vadim Evseev	27 March 2019

== Tournament format and regulations ==
=== Basic ===
The 16 teams will play a round-robin tournament whereby each team plays each one of the other teams twice, once at home and once away. Thus, a total of 240 matches will be played, with 30 matches played by each team.

=== Promotion and relegation ===
The teams that finish 15th and 16th will be relegated to the FNL, while the top 2 in that league will be promoted to the Premier League for the 2019–20 season.

The 13th and 14th Premier League teams will play the 4th and 3rd FNL teams respectively in two playoff games with the winners securing Premier League spots for the 2019–20 season.

== League table ==
Pos	Team	Pld	W	D	L	GF	GA	GD	Pts	Qualification or relegation
1	Zenit Saint Petersburg (C)	30	20	4	6	57	29	+28	64	Qualification for the Champions League group stage
2	Lokomotiv Moscow	30	16	8	6	45	28	+17	56 (Note: Head-to-head away goals: Lokomotiv 1, Krasnodar 0.)	Qualification for the Champions League group stage
3	Krasnodar	30	16	8	6	55	23	+32	56	Qualification for the Champions League third qualifying round
4	CSKA Moscow	30	14	9	7	46	23	+23	51	Qualification for the Europa League group stage (Note: Lokomotiv Moscow won the 2018–19 Russian Cup. As they already qualified for the Champions League, the Europa League group stage spot (originally designated for the Cup winner) goes to the fourth-placed team, third qualifying round spot goes to fifth-placed team and second qualifying round spot goes to sixth-placed team.)
5	Spartak Moscow	30	14	7	9	36	31	+5	49	Qualification for the Europa League third qualifying round
6	Arsenal Tula	30	12	10	8	40	33	+7	46	Qualification for the Europa League second qualifying round
7	Orenburg	30	12	7	11	39	34	+5	43	
8	Akhmat Grozny	30	11	9	10	29	30	−1	42	
9	Rostov	30	10	11	9	25	23	+2	41	
10	Ural Yekaterinburg	30	10	8	12	33	45	−12	38	
11	Rubin Kazan	30	7	15	8	24	30	−6	36	
12	Dynamo Moscow	30	6	15	9	28	28	0	33	
13	Krylia Sovetov Samara (O)	30	8	4	18	25	46	−21	28	Qualification for the Relegation play-offs
14	Ufa (O)	30	5	11	14	24	34	−10	26	Qualification for the Relegation play-offs
15	Anzhi Makhachkala (R)	30	5	6	19	13	50	−37	21	Relegation to Football National League
16	Yenisey Krasnoyarsk (R)	30	4	8	18	24	55	−31	20	Relegation to Football National League

Updated to match(es) played on 26 May 2019. Source: Russian Premier League, Soccerway
Rules for classification: 1) Points; 2) Head-to-head points; 3) Head-to-head matches won; 4) Head-to-head goal difference; 5) Head-to-head goals scored; 6) Head-to-head away goals; 7) Matches won; 8) Goal difference; 9) Goals scored; 10) Away goals scored; 11) Play-off.
(C) Champions; (O) Play-off winner; (R) Relegated

== Relegation play-offs ==
The draw for relegation play-offs scheduling took place on 16 May 2019. The referees (including VAR teams) were appointed on 27 May 2019.

=== First leg ===
30 May 2019
19:00 UTC+5

Ufa	2–0	Tom Tomsk
Igboun 28'; Ediyev 80' (o.g.)	Report

Neftyanik Stadium, Ufa
Attendance: 9,384
Referee: Mikhail Vilkov (Nizhny Novgorod)

30 May 2019
19:00 UTC+3

Nizhny Novgorod	1–3	Krylia Sovetov Samara
Fomin 23' (pen.)	Report	Fedoriv 65' (o.g.); Zinkovsky 90+1' (pen.); Shiskin 90+4'

Nizhny Novgorod Stadium, Nizhny Novgorod
Attendance: 21,800
Referee: Sergey Lapochkin (Saint Petersburg)

=== Second leg ===
2 June 2019
18:00 UTC+7

Tom Tomsk	1–0	Ufa
Gasilin 11'	Report

Trud Stadium, Tomsk
Attendance: 6,210
Referee: Vitali Meshkov (Dmitrov)

FC Ufa won 2–1 on aggregate and retained their spot in the 2019–20 Russian Premier League; Tom Tomsk remained in the 2019–20 Russian National Football League.

2 June 2019
18:00 UTC+4

Krylia Sovetov Samara	0–1	Nizhny Novgorod
	Report	Fomin 45' (pen.)

Samara Arena, Samara
Attendance: 23,441
Referee: Sergei Karasev (Moscow)

Krylia Sovetov won 3–2 on aggregate and retained their spot in the 2019–20 Russian Premier League; Nizhny Novgorod remained in the 2019–20 Russian National Football League.

== Results ==
Home \ Away	AKH	ANZ	ARS	CSK	DYN	KRA	KRY	LOK	ORE	ROS	RUB	SPA	UFA	URA	YEN	ZEN
Akhmat Grozny	—	0–0	2–0	0–2	0–0	1–1	2–1	1–3	1–1	1–0	1–1	1–3	2–1	1–1	1–0	1–1
Anzhi Makhachkala	0–1	—	0–1	0–2	1–1	0–4	0–2	0–2	1–3	1–1	1–1	0–3	0–0	0–2	2–1	2–1
Arsenal Tula	3–1	2–0	—	2–0	0–0	0–3	4–0	2–0	2–2	0–1	2–2	3–0	1–1	0–0	2–0	4–2
CSKA Moscow	1–0	2–0	3–0	—	2–2	1–2	6–0	0–1	2–3	0–1	3–0	1–1	2–2	4–0	2–1	2–0
Dynamo Moscow	0–0	0–1	3–3	0–0	—	1–1	1–0	0–1	2–0	0–0	1–1	0–1	3–0	4–0	1–2	1–0
Krasnodar	0–1	5–0	3–0	2–0	3–0	—	1–0	2–1	2–2	2–2	1–0	0–1	1–1	2–0	3–0	2–3
Krylia Sovetov Samara	1–2	1–0	0–1	0–0	1–0	0–3	—	0–1	0–3	1–0	1–0	1–2	1–1	0–1	4–0	0–1
Lokomotiv Moscow	2–0	2–1	3–1	1–1	1–1	1–0	2–2	—	2–1	2–1	4–0	0–0	1–0	1–2	2–1	1–1
Orenburg	1–3	0–1	1–1	0–1	1–0	1–1	3–1	1–0	—	3–0	1–0	2–0	1–0	2–2	0–0	1–2
Rostov	1–0	1–0	0–0	0–0	0–0	1–1	0–1	1–2	0–1	—	1–1	2–1	0–0	2–1	4–0	1–0
Rubin Kazan	1–0	0–0	0–0	1–1	1–1	2–1	2–1	0–0	2–0	0–2	—	1–1	1–1	1–0	1–0	0–1
Spartak Moscow	1–2	1–0	2–3	0–2	2–1	1–1	3–1	2–1	1–0	0–1	1–1	—	1–0	1–2	2–0	1–1
Ufa	0–1	3–0	1–2	0–3	1–2	0–1	1–2	0–0	0–2	1–0	0–0	2–0	—	4–1	2–1	0–2
Ural Yekaterinburg	2–1	0–1	2–1	0–1	1–1	1–2	1–1	2–2	2–1	1–1	2–1	0–1	1–1	—	3–2	0–1
Yenisey Krasnoyarsk	1–1	3–1	0–0	1–1	2–2	0–4	1–0	0–3	2–1	1–1	1–1	2–3	0–0	1–2	—	0–2
Zenit Saint Petersburg	1–0	5–0	1–0	3–1	2–0	2–1	4–2	5–3	3–1	2–0	1–2	0–0	2–1	4–1	4–1	—

Updated to match(es) played on 26 May 2019. Source: Russian Premier League
Legend: Blue = home team win; Yellow = draw; Red = away team win.
For upcoming matches, an "a" indicates there is an article about the rivalry between the two participants.

=== Positions by round ===
The table lists the positions of teams after each week of matches. In order to preserve chronological evolvements, any postponed matches are not included to the round at which they were originally scheduled, but added to the full round they were played immediately afterwards.

Team ╲ Round	1	2	3	4	5	6	7	8	9	10	11	12	13	14	15	16	17	18	19	20	21	22	23	24	25	26	27	28	29	30
Zenit St. Petersburg	1	1	1	1	1	1	1	1	1	1	1	1	1	1	1	1	1	1	1	1	1	1	1	1	1	1	1	1	1	1
Lokomotiv Moscow	6	11	14	9	5	8	10	11	7	7	4	3	2	3	4	5	5	5	5	3	2	4	2	2	2	2	2	2	2	2
Krasnodar	12	7	4	5	6	5	4	2	2	2	2	2	3	2	2	2	2	2	2	4	3	2	3	3	4	3	3	3	3	3
CSKA Moscow	7	12	13	7	8	6	5	5	4	6	3	6	5	5	3	3	3	3	3	2	4	3	4	4	3	4	4	5	5	4
Spartak Moscow	4	5	2	2	2	2	3	4	5	4	7	5	6	9	7	4	4	4	4	5	5	5	5	5	5	5	5	4	4	5
Arsenal Tula	9	14	7	10	10	12	11	10	13	12	10	10	12	11	11	10	11	9	9	9	7	7	8	8	6	6	6	6	6	6
Orenburg	15	6	3	3	4	4	8	6	9	8	8	8	7	10	8	7	10	12	12	10	8	10	7	6	7	7	9	9	8	7
Akhmat Grozny	13	8	10	12	13	9	7	8	10	9	9	9	10	8	10	11	8	8	8	8	10	9	10	9	9	9	8	7	9	8
Rostov	5	2	5	4	3	3	2	3	3	3	5	4	4	4	5	6	7	7	7	6	6	6	6	7	8	8	7	8	7	9
Ural Yekaterinburg	14	15	15	15	14	15	14	12	8	10	12	12	9	7	6	8	9	11	11	13	13	11	12	11	10	10	11	11	11	10
Rubin Kazan	2	4	8	8	9	11	6	7	6	5	6	7	8	6	9	9	6	6	6	7	9	8	9	10	11	11	10	10	10	11
Dynamo Moscow	10	10	12	6	7	7	9	9	11	14	11	11	11	12	12	12	12	10	10	12	12	13	13	12	12	12	12	12	12	12
Krylya Sovetov	11	13	9	13	12	10	12	13	15	11	13	13	13	13	13	15	13	13	13	11	11	12	11	13	13	13	13	13	13	13
Ufa	8	3	6	11	11	14	15	15	14	15	14	14	15	14	14	13	14	15	15	15	15	14	14	14	14	14	14	14	14	14
Anzhi Makhachkala	3	9	11	14	16	16	16	14	12	13	15	15	14	15	15	14	15	14	14	14	14	15	15	15	15	15	15	15	15	15
Yenisey Krasnoyarsk	16	16	16	16	15	13	13	16	16	16	16	16	16	16	16	16	16	16	16	16	16	16	16	16	16	16	16	16	16	16

Updated to match(es) played on 26 May 2019. Source: soccerway.com

== Season statistics ==
=== Top goalscorers ===
Top goalscorers
Rank	Player	Team	Goals
1	(Russia) Fyodor Chalov	CSKA Moscow	15
2	(Iran) Sardar Azmoun	Rubin Kazan; Zenit St. Petersburg	13
3	(Sweden) Viktor Claesson	Krasnodar	12
4	(Argentina) Sebastián Driussi	Zenit St. Petersburg	11
4	(Russia) Anton Miranchuk	Lokomotiv Moscow	11
6	(Cape Verde) Zé Luís	Spartak Moscow	10
7	(Nigeria) Sylvester Igboun	Ufa	9
8	(Russia) Ari	Krasnodar	8
8	(Russia) Zelimkhan Bakayev	Arsenal Tula	8
8	(Russia) Artem Dzyuba	Zenit St. Petersburg	8
8	(Peru) Jefferson Farfán	Lokomotiv Moscow	8
8	(Russia) Magomed-Shapi Suleymanov	Krasnodar	8
8	(Russia) Aleksei Sutormin	Orenburg	8

== Attendances ==
Pos	Team	Total	High	Low	Average	Change
1	Zenit	612,093	61,467	40,463	47,084	+7.1%
2	Spartak Moscow	438,584	44,486	20,015	31,327	+3.8%
3	Rostov	395,883	41,097	21,850	30,452	+139.2%
4	Krasnodar	343,102	34,652	12,313	24,507	−2.1%
5	CSKA Moscow	226,984	29,361	9,013	18,915	+21.2%
6	Krylya Sovetov	234,613	39,137	7,213	18,047	+127.2%^{1}
7	Lokomotiv Moscow	194,988	26,892	7,218	14,999	+18.0%
8	Ural Yekaterinburg	191,921	20,365	4,213	14,763	+81.9%
9	Akhmat Grozny	113,962	16,342	1,850	10,360	−31.7%
10	Rubin Kazan	132,894	26,531	3,282	10,222	+5.3%
11	Arsenal Tula	136,757	15,646	7,869	9,768	−18.1%
12	Ufa	106,075	10,926	3,187	7,576	+9.5%
13	Yenisey Krasnoyarsk	90,443	14,915	1,285	7,536	+158.1%^{1}
14	Dynamo Moscow	97,849	14,674	4,133	7,526	+10.8%
15	Orenburg	62,766	7,083	2,453	4,828	+57.6%^{1}
16	Anzhi Makhachkala	53,718	9,255	1,655	4,476	−29.9%
	League total	3,444,629	61,467	1,285	16,561	+18.7%

Updated to games played on 29 April 2019
Notes:
1: Team played last season in the Russian Football National League.

== Awards ==
=== Top 33 ===
On 26 June 2019, Russian Football Union named its list of 33 top players:

Goalkeepers

1. (Russia) Igor Akinfeev (CSKA)
2. (Russia) Gulherme (Lokomotiv)
3. (Russia) Andrey Lunyov (Zenit)

Right backs

1. (Russia) Mário Fernandes (CSKA)
2. (Russia) Vladislav Ignatyev (Lokomotiv)
3. (Russia) Sergei Petrov (Krasnodar)

Right-centre backs

1. (Serbia) Branislav Ivanović (Zenit)
2. (Russia) Andrei Semyonov (Akhmat)
3. (Russia) Maksim Belyayev (Arsenal)

Left-centre backs

1. (Russia) Georgi Dzhikiya (Spartak)
2. (Ukraine) Yaroslav Rakitskiy (Zenit)
3. (Serbia) Uroš Spajić (Krasnodar)

Left backs

1. (Russia) Yuri Zhirkov (Zenit)
2. (Russia) Fyodor Kudryashov (Rubin/İstanbul Başakşehir)
3. (Ecuador) Cristian Ramírez (Krasnodar)

Defensive midfielders

1. (Russia) Yury Gazinsky (Krasnodar)
2. (Croatia) Nikola Vlašić (CSKA)
3. (Russia) Magomed Ozdoyev (Zenit)

Right midfielders

1. (Brazil) Wanderson (Krasnodar)
2. (Russia) Aleksei Miranchuk (Lokomotiv)
3. (Russia) Aleksei Ionov (Rostov)

Centre midfielders

1. (Poland) Grzegorz Krychowiak (Lokomotiv)
2. (Russia) Roman Zobnin (Spartak)
3. (Colombia) Wílmar Barrios (Zenit)

Left midfielders

1. (Sweden) Viktor Claesson (Krasnodar)
2. (Russia) Anton Miranchuk (Lokomotiv)
3. (Russia) Reziuan Mirzov (Arsenal)

Right forwards

1. (Russia) Fyodor Chalov (CSKA)
2. (Iran) Sardar Azmoun (Rubin/Zenit)
3. (Montenegro) Luka Đorđević (Arsenal)

Left forwards

1. (Russia) Artem Dzyuba (Zenit)
2. (Peru) Jefferson Farfán (Lokomotiv)
3. (Cape Verde) Zé Luís (Spartak)

Other awards announced on the same day included:

Player of the year: Artem Dzyuba.

Hope prize (under-21 players): Matvei Safonov (Krasnodar).

Coach of the year: Sergei Semak (Zenit).

Team of the year: FC Zenit Saint Petersburg.

For contribution to football development: Stanislav Cherchesov.

== See also ==
- Russian National Football League
- Russian Cup
