= Zazerkalie =

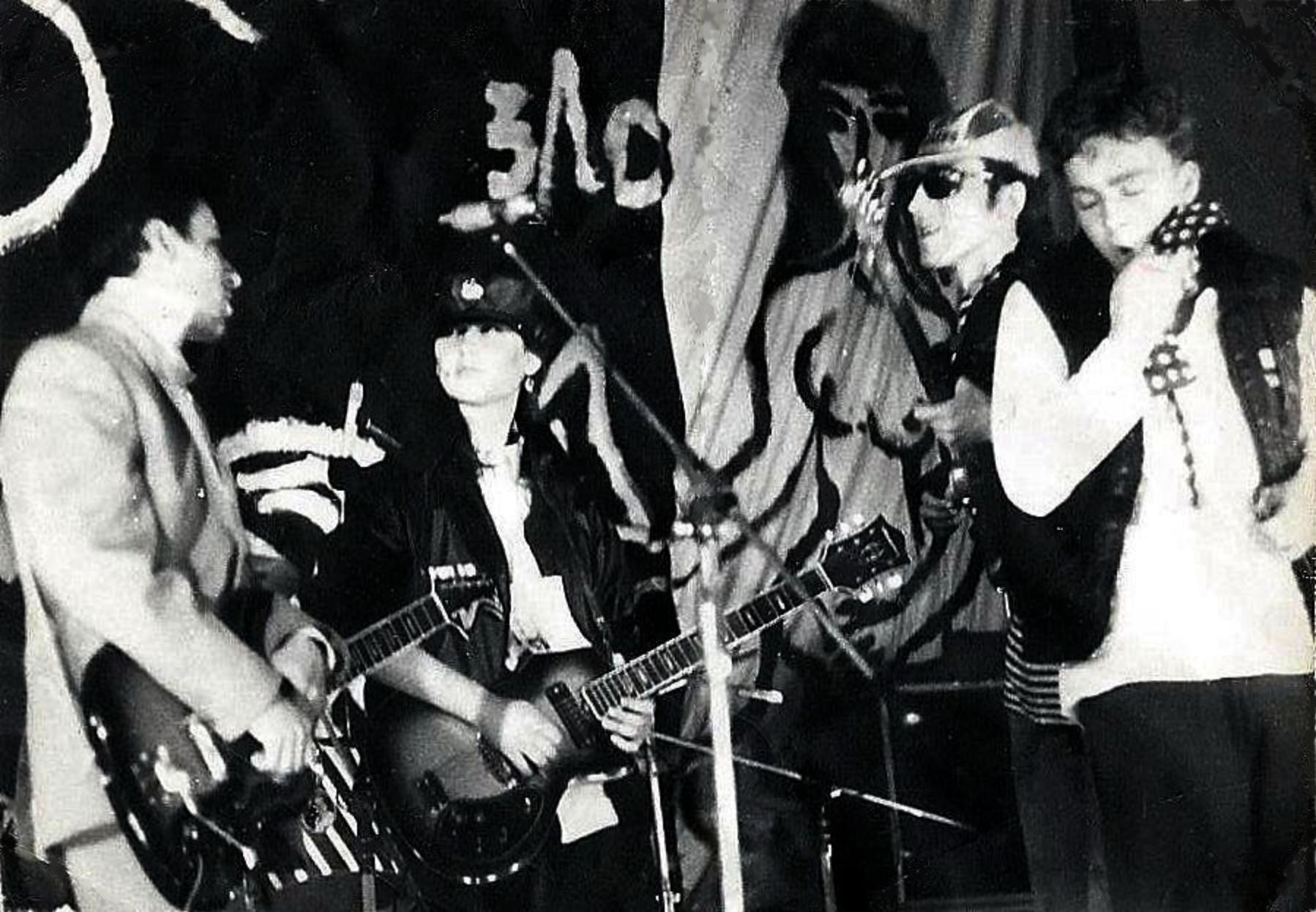
- Zazerkalie in 1989

Background information
- Origin: Rostov-on-Don, USSR
- Genres: punk-rock; post-punk
- Years active: 1987–2013

Zazerkalie (Russian: Зазеркалье) were a Soviet and Russian post-punk band, formed in Rostov-on-Don, USSR, in 1987. They were one of the most important rock bands of the Don rock of the 80-90s.

== History ==
Zazerkalie was founded in Rostov-on-Don in the fall of 1987 through the efforts of Boris Prodonenko, Anatoly Chebotarev, Nikolay Smirnov and Alexander Skrynnikov. The initial 4 years of existence of Zazerkalie were marked only by defiant behavior at concerts and dubious reputation in the scale of the Rostov region.

In 1988, after a scandalous performance at the Tagan-Rock festival in Taganrog, the band disassociated itself from the Rostov rock club and performed at various venues under constantly changing names: "Знамя и голубь мира" (Znamya i golub' mira), "Питсбург Пингвинс" (Pittsbourgh Penguins), "Индиры Ганди" (Indiry Gandi), "Давка Даунов" (Davka Daunov) etc. At the festival of Rostov rock-club Zakritaya Zona in 1989 the band performed under the name of "NKVD" (Nezhniye Kamertoni Vashih Dush).

In 1989 Oleg Gaponov came to Zazerkalie from the Rostov band "Пекин Роу-Роу".

In summer 1992 Zazerkalie undertook a series of concerts in Tyumen together with Nick Rock'n'Roll.

The peak of the band's popularity came in 1989-1993.

"Zazerkalie has always gravitated toward transforming life into an ancient Roman theater, experimenting with the forms and content of the contemporary underground, blending backyard and soldier folk with art noir in a daring way. Psychedelic, pseudo-Nietzschean texts with subtle mockery of domestic conspiracy, images of romantic and sentimental literature of the century before last are synthesized with odious musical genres such as post-punk, synth-punk, electro-punk, industrial, synth-pop and darkwave. Out of all this is born a bizarre and grotesque world, frightening and attractive at the same time. But having paid tribute to numerous genre experiments, the band gravitated to a simple form of synthesis of punk music with Russian chanson, such sound was largely determined by the characteristic vocal of Alexander Skrynnikov.

In 1994, Oleg Gaponov and Ivan Trofimov, the future leader of the band "Запрещённые барабанщики" (Zapreshchonnyye barabanshchiki), organized a regional branch of the National Bolshevik Party in Rostov-on-Don.

In January 2008, the audio-visual drama "Bright Light" created by the group Zazerkalie and the animation artist Yuri Bessmertny was presented in Rostov-on-Don.

Vocalist Aleksandr Skrynnikov died in July 2013.

== Discography ==
- 1991 — Солдатская совесть (Soldatskaya sovest)
- 1992 — Бугорки Безымянных Могил (Bugorky Bezymyannih Mogil)
- 1992 — Всё Золото Мира (Vse Zoloto Mira)
- 1993 — Jesus Christ Superstar
- 1993 — Crazy House Music
- 2005 — Власть Судьбы (Vlast Sudbi)
- 2006 — Весна Священная (Vesna Svyaschennaya)
- 2008 — Между мирами (Mezhdu mirami)
