= Gapon =

Gapon may refer to:

- Georgy Gapon (1870–1906), Russian Orthodox priest
- Yevgeny Gapon (b. 1991), Russian association football player
- Gapon, nickname of Jovan Grković (1879–1912), Serbian Orthodox monk and chetnik
- Gapon, a colloquial form of the Russian male first name Agafon
- Gafon, a diminutive of the Russian male first name Agafonik

== See also ==
- Hapon, alternative transliteration
