= Raúl Riancho =

Spanish football fitness coach (born 1960)

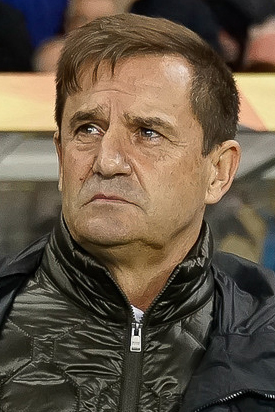

Personal information
- Full name: Raúl Ruiz González-Riancho
- Date of birth: 13 February 1960 (age 66)
- Place of birth: Ontaneda, Cantabria, Spain

Managerial career
- Years: Team
- Gimnástica de Torrelavega (assistant)
- Racing de Santander (fitness coach)
- 2006–2008: Levante (assistant)
- 2009–2014: Rubin Kazan (fitness coach)
- 2014–2016: Dynamo Kyiv (assistant)
- 2016–2018: Ukraine (assistant)
- 2018: Spartak Moscow (assistant)
- 2018: Spartak Moscow (caretaker)

Raúl Ruiz González–Riancho (born 13 February 1960) is a Spanish football fitness coach. From October to November 2018, he was the interim manager of Spartak Moscow.

== Career ==
He started his career in Gimnástica de Torrelavega as physical trainer and assistant coach working alongside Manuel Preciado Rebolledo. After that he worked for Racing de Santander, Levante UD, and FC Rubin Kazan.

In February 2014, he signed a contract with the Ukrainian side FC Dynamo Kyiv as fitness coach and assistant for Serhii Rebrov. Here he worked until 30 June 2016.

On 15 July 2016, he was appointed as assistant coach of the Ukraine national football team to help the head coach Andriy Shevchenko.
