= Istomin =

Istomin (masculine, Russian: Истомин) or Istomina (feminine, Russian: Истомина) is a Russian surname. Notable people with the surname include:

- Avdotia Istomina (1799–1848), Russian ballerina
- Denis Istomin (born 1986), Uzbekistani tennis player
- Denis Istomin (ice hockey) (born 1987), Russian ice hockey player
- Eugene Istomin (1925–2003), American pianist
- Ivan G. Istomin (1917—1988) — Nenets and Komi author
- Karina Istomina (born 1994), Russian disk jockey, blogger, and model
- Kateryna Istomina (born 1994), Ukrainian paralympic swimmer
- Marta Casals Istomin (born 1937), Puerto Rican musician
- Vladimir Istomin (1809–1855), Russian admiral
- Yuriy Istomin (1944–1999), Ukrainian soccer player
