= Matrena Vakhrusheva =

Mansi linguist and poet

Matrena Pankrat'yevna Vakhrusheva
- Матрена Панкратьевна Вахрушевa; Матрёна Панкратьевна Вахрушевa
- Born: Matrena Pankrat'yevna Vakhrusheva; 12 April 1918; Kharmpavyl, Kondinsky District, Ostyak–Vogul National Okrug, Soviet Russia
- Died: 1 January 2000 (aged 81); Saint Petersburg, Russia
- Other names: Matrona Pankratyevna Vakhrusheva; Matrena Pankratievna Vakhrusheva-Balandina
- Occupations: linguist, writer
- Years active: 1937-1995
- Spouse: Alexei Nikolayevich Balandin

Matrena Pankrat'yevna Vakhrusheva (Russian: Матрена Панкратьевна Вахрушевa also Russian: Матрёна Панкратьевна Вахрушевa; 12 April 1918 – 1 January 2000) was a Mansi linguist, philologist and writer. She is considered a pioneer in the development of Mansi literature and orthography for the Mansi language. She was the first Mansi woman to earn a scientific degree and co-wrote the first Mansi-Russian dictionary.

== Early life ==
Matrena Pankrat'yevna Vakhrusheva was born on 12 April 1918 in Kharmpavyl in the Kondinsky District of the Ostyak–Vogul National Okrug of Soviet Russia to Ekaterina Semenovna (née Alagulova) and Pankratia Mikhailovich Vakhrushev. The family of six children were raised on their ancestral lands, where their father engaged in farming, raising cattle, horses, and Siberian huskies. Prior to her marriage, Vakhrusheva's mother had worked in domestic service to the merchant Popov family in Nakhrachi. At 9, Vakhrusheva began attending school at the public school. The teacher, Kapitolina Andreevna taught in a one-room school with children of a broad range of ages. While she taught them Russian language, reading and writing, Andreevna studied Mansi, to enable her to communicate better with her students. By the end of the year, a new school was built which included music and drama courses. After finishing elementary school, Vakhrusheva and her brother Andrei were sent to Nakhrachi to attend a seven-year secondary school.

With the advent of the Great Depression, collectivization of farming, anti-kulak campaign and purges of the 1930s, the family were forcibly separated and their movable goods redistributed. Pankratia, as "the son of a kulak", was able to keep the ancestral land to feed his family, but had to move to various villages around Tobolsk, while Ekaterina cared for the younger children in Kharmpavyl. The family would not be reunited until 1943, when Ekaterina died. In 1933, Vakhrusheva and Andrei moved to Ostyako-Vogulsk, so that she could study at the newly established normal school. Encouraged by her instructors, Victoria Senkevich and Ilya Gudkov, she joined a group of students who actively worked write literary works and collect folklore and ethnographic material for publication in the newspaper Советский Север (Soviet North).

Vakhrusheva began writing her own poems and translated some of the stories of Vladimir Korolenko, Dmitry Mamin-Sibiryak, and Alexander Pushkin into the Mansi language. These were first published in the paper Остяко-Вогульская правда (Ostyako-Vogulsk Truth). In 1940, some of her works were included in the poetry compilation, Хантыйская и мансийская поэзия (Khanty and Mansi poetry) gathered together by Senkevich and Gudkov from their students. As Mansi literature had an oral tradition, writing poetry created complications and Vakhrusheva's style varied. When she tried to replicate Mansi lyric songs, Vakhrusheva "successfully preserved the choral measures and the inherent Mansi folk song melodic rhythms". When she attempted to write using the rules of Russian poetry, her works were not as successful. She graduated with honors, earning her certification to teach.

== Career ==
Vakhrusheva began teaching at a kindergarten in Evra. Wanting to continue her education, in 1938 she traveled to Leningrad and entered the Institute of the Peoples of the North. She joined the Komsomol and became secretary of the organization. When the Great Patriotic War broke out, she was sent to work as an instructor at a factory school and served as a recruiter. During the Siege of Leningrad in the day, she worked with the Sanitation squadron at the evacuation hospital and dug trenches, and at night helped extinguish bombs on building rooftops. In February 1942, the institute was evacuated to Omsk, where Vakhrusheva was assigned to work in the hospital and serve as a secretary in the criminal investigation department.

Returning to Kharmpavyl, Vakhrusheva began teaching at the elementary school she had attended and quickly became the director of the school. When the war ended, she was awarded the medals "For the Defence of Leningrad" and "For Valiant Labour in the Great Patriotic War 1941–1945". In 1943, she was sent to teach Mansi language courses at the normal school in Ostyako-Vogulsk, which had been renamed as Khanty-Mansiysk, where she remained until 1947. That year, Vakhrusheva returned to Leningrad to begin her graduate studies at Andrei A. Zhdanov State University on the grammar of the Mansi language. In 1949, while she was still working on her thesis, Формирование сложных слов мансийского языка на базе соматической лексики [на материале кондинского диалекта] (Formation of complex words of the Mansi language on the basis of somatic vocabulary [based on the material of the Kondinian dialect]), Vakhrusheva began teaching Mansi at the A. I. Herzen Pedagogical Institute.

One of her doctoral advisors, Alexei Nikolayevich Balandin, who would later become her husband, encouraged her to write literature to create texts in her native language for students. She published an autobiographical story in the Mansi language На берегу Малой Юконды (On the Shore of Malaya Yukonda) in 1949. The book told the story of her transformation from a traditional village girl to an educated communist woman. In a collection of 12 short stories, she began with a description of family life in the harsh northern climate and the resourcefulness of her people. She told of the difficulties of beginning school, when the teacher could only speak Russian and her students only spoke Mansi. Another story told of her arrival in the city and experiencing an urban environment with modern technology for the first time. Though written in a propagandistic style, praising the Soviet enhancements in favor of traditional life, she also employed a traditional artistic device, the confession-song of her people. The style incorporated folklore rhythms, respect for the natural world, and allegories to relay a life story. The book created a literary sensation when it was translated into Russian by Gennady Gor.

Completing her PhD in 1952, Vakhrusheva became the first Mansi woman to earn a scientific degree. Most of her research career was dedicated to creating textbooks and pedagogic materials for the Mansi and Khanty languages. She compiled a Mansi-Russian dictionary, a manual for teaching adult literacy, and designed curricula to train teachers in Mansi and Khanty. With her husband, she wrote the first complete orthography for Mansi grammar creating the foundation for the study of her native tongue. Teaching for 46 years at the A. I. Herzen Pedagogical Institute, she published around 24 textbooks and influenced generations of students, like Nina Lyskova, Evdokia Nemysova, Anastasia Saynakhova, Yuvan Shestalov, Valentina Solovar, and Andrei Tarkhanov, among others.

== Death and legacy ==
Vakhrusheva died on 1 January 2000 in Saint Petersburg and was interred at the Rzhevsky Cemetery. She is considered as one of the pioneers of the development of Mansi literature. On the centennial of her birth in 2018, her alma mater, now known as the Khanty-Mansiysk Technological and Pedagogical College, hosted a celebration to honor her contributions to their school and the indigenous community.

== Selected works ==
- Вахрушевa, М. П. (1940). Сенкевич, В. В.; Гудков, И. С. (eds.). Хантыйская и мансийская поэзия [Khanty and Mansi poetry] (in Russian). Omsk, USSR: Омское областное книжное издательство.
- Вахрушевa, М. П. (1949). "На берегу Малой Юконды". In Горa, Г. (translator) (ed.). Мы – люди Севера [We are the People of the North] (in Russian). Leningrad, USSR.
- Баландин, А. Н.; Вахрушевa, М. П. (1950). Русско-мансийский словарь [Russian-Mansi Dictionary] (in Russian). Leningrad, USSR: Учпедгиз.
- Вахрушевa, М. П. (1952). Методическое пособие для обучения грамоте взрослых манси [The Manual for Mansi Adult Literacy Education] (in Russian). Leningrad, USSR: Учпедгиз.
- Вахрушевa, М. П. (1957). Методика преподавания мансийского языка / Методика преподавания хантыйского языка [Methods of teaching the Mansi language / Methods of teaching the Khanty language] (in Russian). Leningrad, USSR.
- Баландин, А. Н.; Вахрушевa, М. П. (1972). Букварь [Primer] (in Russian). Leningrad, USSR: Просвещение.
- Вахрушевa, М. П. (1973). О грамматикализации лексических элементов в обско-угорских языках [On the grammatization of lexical elements in the Ob-Ugric languages] (in Russian). Leningrad, USSR: Leningrad State Pedagogical Institute.
- Вахрушевa, М. П. (1974). Керт, Г.М. (ed.). Выражение значения времени и места в языках угорской группы [The Expression of the Meaning of Time and Place in the Ugric Languages Group] (in Russian). Petrozavodsk, USSR: Institute of Linguistics of the Russian Academy of Sciences.
