= Ivan G. Istomin =

Soviet Nenets and Komi writer (1917–1988)

Ivan Grigoriyevich Istomin
- Born: February 7, 1917; Muzhi, Beryozovsky Uyezd, Tobolsk Governorate, Russian Empire
- Died: 1988
- Occupations: Novelist, painter
- Writing career
- Language: Nenets, Komi, Russian

Ivan Grigoryevich Istomin (Russian: Иван Григорьевич Истомин; February 7, 1917 – 1988) was a Nenets and Komi writer.

== Personal life ==
Istomin was born into a family of Komi fishermen. In 1934, he graduated from the seven-year middle school in Muzhi. He graduated with distinction from the national pedagogical institute in Salekhard four years later, in 1938. While studying at the pedagogical institute, he helped organize the institute's literary society.

== Career ==
From 1938 to 1950, he taught Russian, Nenets and drawing at schools in the Yamalo-Nenets Autonomous Okrug. After that, he worked as the sub-editor for the Nenets-language newspaper "Nyaryana Ngerm". In 1955, he was admitted to the Soviet Union of Writers. From 1958 to 1965, he served as the assistant managing editor of national literature at the Tyumen Publishing House.

In 1936, a local newspaper published his first poem ”Reindeer”. Later on, his poems and short stories were published in literary magazines such as Siberian Lights, Druzhba Narodov, Ural, Neva, Voyvyv kodzuv. In 1953, Our North, Istomin's first anthology of Nenets poems, was published as a stand-alone edition. Since then, more than 20 editions of his short stories, novellas, and novels, including his novels Zhivun and Vstany-trava, have been published in Russian, Nenets and Komi. In addition to his literary talents, Istomin also studied painting and two of his paintings are on display in the local museum in Salehkard.

== Honours and awards ==
- Order of the Badge of Honour (February 2, 1967)

== See also ==
- Yamal to Its Descendants
- Maria Barmich
