= Association to Save Yugra =

The Association to Save Yugra (or Save Yugra, Russian: Спасение Югры, Spaseniye Yugry) is an Indigenous-rights organisation of the nomadic Khanty, Mansi, and Nenets peoples of Western Siberia. The organisation was founded in 1989 to protect their traditional lands against extractive industries such as oil, gas, and logging. The organisation held its first congress in August 1989, and took a stance opposing logging in their forests.

The organisation is named for Yugra, the traditional homeland of the Uralic peoples, in what is now Northern Russia.

== See also ==
- Yamal to Its Descendants
