= Fyodor Smolov =

Russian footballer (born 1990)

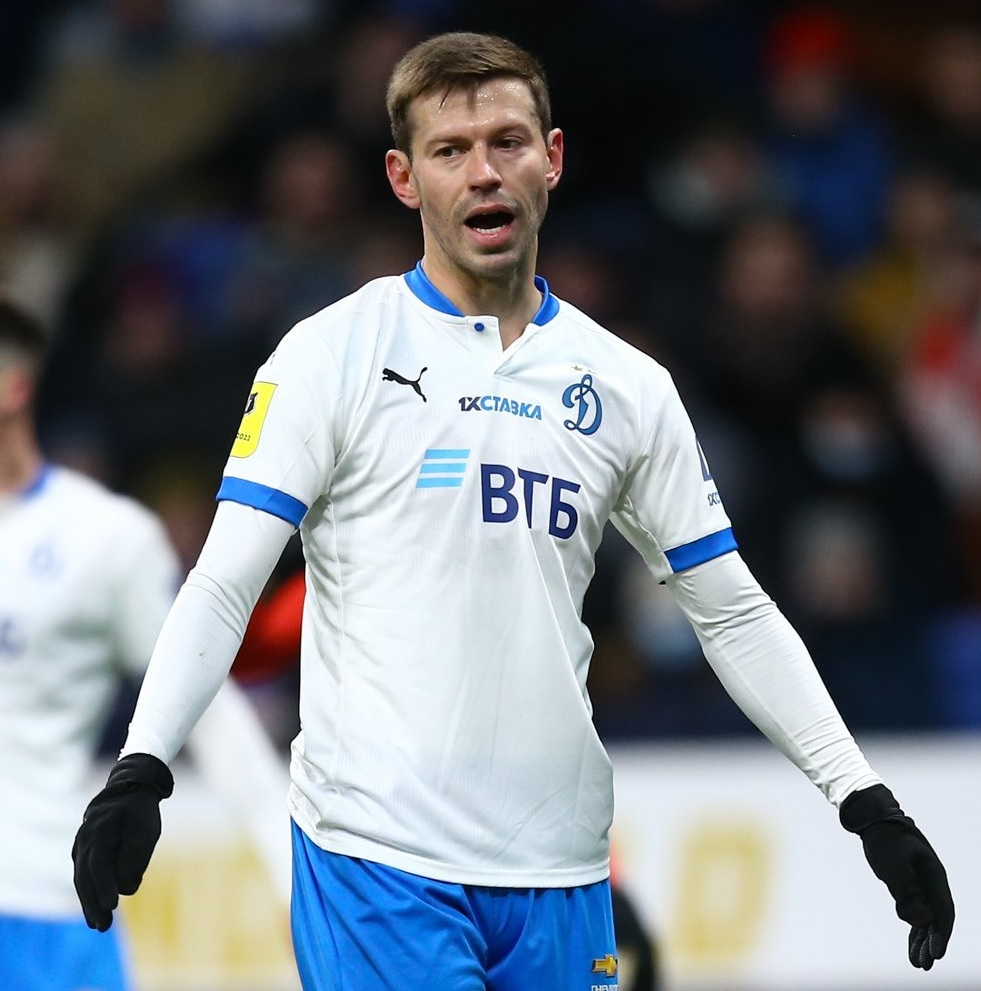
- Smolov with Dynamo Moscow in 2022

Personal information
- Full name: Fyodor Mikhailovich Smolov
- Date of birth: 9 February 1990 (age 36)
- Place of birth: Saratov, Russian SFSR, Soviet Union
- Height: 1.87 m (6 ft 2 in)
- Position: Striker

Youth career
- 1997–2004: Sokol Saratov
- 2005–2006: Master-Saturn Yegoryevsk
- 2006–2007: Saturn Moscow

Senior career*
Years	Team	Apps	(Gls)
2007–2015	Dynamo Moscow	68	(3)
2010	→ Feyenoord (loan)	11	(1)
2012–2013	→ Anzhi Makhachkala (loan)	15	(0)
2014	→ Anzhi Makhachkala (loan)	11	(2)
2014–2015	→ Ural Yekaterinburg (loan)	22	(8)
2015–2018	Krasnodar	75	(53)
2018–2022	Lokomotiv Moscow	72	(23)
2020	→ Celta Vigo (loan)	14	(2)
2022–2024	Dynamo Moscow	60	(19)
2024–2025	Krasnodar	16	(1)
2026	BB Fankom	1	(0)

International career^{‡}
2006–2007	Russia U17	11	(5)
2008	Russia U19	5	(3)
2008–2013	Russia U21	32	(16)
2012–2021	Russia	45	(16)
- * Club domestic league appearances and goals as of 13 April 2025 ‡ National team caps and goals as of 14 November 2021

Fyodor Mikhaylovich Smolov (Russian: Фёдор Миха́йлович Смо́лов, IPA: [ˈfʲɵdər mʲɪˈxajləvʲɪtɕ ˈsmoləf]; born 9 February 1990) is a Russian former professional footballer who played as a striker.

== Club career ==
Smolov is a graduate of the Master-Saturn Yegoryevsk football academy. In 2007, he joined Dynamo Moscow. He made his Russian Premier League debut for Dynamo on 28 April 2007 in a game against FC Luch-Energiya Vladivostok, at the age of 17, as a last-minute substitute for Cícero. Despite scoring prolifically for the national junior teams and Dynamo's own Under-21 squad, he only scored one goal for the senior team in the next 3.5 seasons and only started in 11 games up to that point. On 14 July 2010, the club announced that Smolov would join Feyenoord on a one-year loan deal.

Returning from loan, Smolov started 2011–12 season as a squad player, but after 9 matchdays his impact was limited to substitute appearances. So he was loaned again, this time to Anzhi Makhachkala - initially for whole 2012–13 season, and then for the second part of 2013–14 season.

=== Loan to Ural ===
On 1 September 2014, Smolov joined Ural Yekaterinburg on a season-long loan deal. Two weeks later, on his new club debut, he scored a goal in a 1–2 away loss to Amkar Perm. He provided 8 goals and 2 assists in 22 league appearances for Ural.

=== Krasnodar ===
On 2 June 2015, Smolov signed a four-year contract with the Russian Premier League club Krasnodar as a free agent. He made his competitive debut for his new club in a 1–0 away victory over Amkar Perm in his first league match on 20 July 2015, and scored his first goal in a 3–3 draw against Slovan Bratislava in the UEFA Europa League third qualifying round on 6 August.

On 10 April 2016, Smolov scored four goals in Krasnodar's 6–0 victory over his former club Ural Yekaterinburg. With 20 goals in 29 games, he became the top scorer of the 2015–16 Russian Premier League season, and he is the first Krasnodar player who achieved this title. He repeated as top scorer in the 2016–17 Russian Premier League, scoring 18 times. In the 2017–18 Russian Premier League, he came in second with 14 goals to Quincy Promes' 15.

=== Lokomotiv Moscow ===
On 9 August 2018, he joined the Russian Premier League champion FC Lokomotiv Moscow.

==== Loan to Celta ====
On 30 January 2020, he joined Spanish club Celta Vigo on loan until the end of the 2019–20 season. He scored his first goal for the new club on 16 February 2020 at Santiago Bernabéu Stadium against Real Madrid in a 2–2 away draw. Smolov scored the second goal of his loan spell in a 2–2 draw with Barcelona on 27 June.

==== Return to Lokomotiv ====
On 12 May 2021, he scored the go-ahead goal in the 2021 Russian Cup Final against Krylia Sovetov. He won his third trophy at Lokomotiv and also became the tournament's joint-top scorer with 4 goals, along with teammate François Kamano.

=== Return to Dynamo ===
On 12 January 2022, Dynamo announced the signing of Fyodor from Lokomotiv, making him return to the first club in his professional career. Also the Moscow club disclosed that the term of the contract is 1.5 years plus an additional optional year. On 26 February 2022, in his first competitive game back with Dynamo, he scored the opening goal of the 3–0 victory over FC Khimki, 11 years after he last scored for Dynamo.

On 31 May 2023, Smolov extended his contract with Dynamo for the 2023–24 season, with an option for the 2024–25 season.

=== Return to Krasnodar ===
On 18 June 2024, Smolov returned to Krasnodar on a one-year contract. On 24 May 2025, he won the Russian Premier League title for the first time in his career. Smolov left Krasnodar on 27 May 2025.

He ended his professional career in 2025.

== International career ==
Smolov was part of the Russia Under-21 side that was competing in the 2011 European Under-21 Championship qualification. He was an important factor in the U-21 team qualifying for the 2013 UEFA European Under-21 Football Championship in the next cycle, scoring three goals in the qualification play-offs against the Czech Republic. On 6 November 2012, Russia manager Fabio Capello included Smolov in the squad for a friendly game against the United States. During the game, he made his debut and scored his first goal for the national team, netting the opener in a 2–2 home draw on 14 November. Smolov scored his first competitive goal for the national team in a 7–0 away victory against Liechtenstein in a Euro 2016 qualifier on 8 September 2015. He was subsequently included in Russia's squad for the final tournament in France, where he started in all three matches as Russia finished 4th in group B. In the opening match of the 2017 FIFA Confederations Cup against New Zealand on 17 June at Krestovsky Stadium, Smolov scored Russia's second goal in a 2–0 win and was Man of the Match.

On 3 June 2018, he was included in the finalized World Cup squad. He started the tournament-opener game against Saudi Arabia and appeared as a substitute in every subsequent game. He scored the opening penalty kick in the shoot-out that helped Russia defeat Spain in the Round of 16, but had his shot saved by Danijel Subašić in the quarterfinal shoot-out which Russia lost to Croatia.

On 11 May 2021, he was named as a back-up player for Russia's UEFA Euro 2020 squad.

== Personal life ==
Smolov is fluent in English and has read Mario Puzo's books in the original language. From 2012, he was in a relationship with Russian model and TV hostess Victoria Lopyreva. The couple got married in December 2013 but then divorced in May 2015. He has supported AC Milan since the 1997–98 season and once cited George Weah and Andriy Shevchenko as his childhood favorite players. On 1 August 2018, Smolov crashed his BMW M5 into a traffic barrier in Krasnodar. He was later fined and had his driver's license suspended for one year for leaving the scene of the accident. On April 5, 2020 Smolov broke Spain's coronavirus protocols to return to Russia to celebrate the 18th birthday of his fiancee Maria Yumasheva, the granddaughter of Boris Yeltsin.

He is the first Russian footballer to speak out against the Russian invasion of Ukraine on 24 February 2022.

In June 2023 Smolov married DJ and blogger Karina Istomina. On the 15th of November of the same year the couple had a daughter named Laura.

== Career statistics ==
=== Club ===
As of match played 13 April 2025

Appearances and goals by club, season and competition
Club	Season	League			National cup (Note: Includes Russian Cup, KNVB Cup, Copa del Rey)		Continental		Other		Total	
Club	Season	Division	Apps	Goals	Apps	Goals	Apps	Goals	Apps	Goals	Apps	Goals
Dynamo Moscow	2007	Russian Premier League	3	0	0	0	—		—		3	0
Dynamo Moscow	2008	Russian Premier League	7	1	1	0	—		—		8	1
Dynamo Moscow	2009	Russian Premier League	18	0	3	1	2 (Note: One appearance in UEFA Champions League, one appearance in UEFA Europa League)	0	—		23	1
Dynamo Moscow	2010	Russian Premier League	2	0	0	0	—		—		2	0
Dynamo Moscow	2011–12	Russian Premier League	23	2	1	0	—		—		24	2
Dynamo Moscow	2013–14	Russian Premier League	13	0	1	0	—		—		14	0
Dynamo Moscow	2014–15	Russian Premier League	2	0	0	0	1 (Note: Appearance(s) in UEFA Europa League)	0	—		3	0
Dynamo Moscow	Total		68	3	6	1	3	0	0	0	77	4
Feyenoord (loan)	2010–11	Eredivisie	11	1	1	0	2	0	—		14	1
Anzhi Makhachkala (loan)	2012–13	Russian Premier League	15	0	3	0	8	1	—		26	1
Anzhi Makhachkala (loan)	2013–14	Russian Premier League	11	2	0	0	4	0	—		15	2
Anzhi Makhachkala (loan)	Total		26	2	3	0	12	1	0	0	41	3
Ural Yekaterinburg (loan)	2014–15	Russian Premier League	22	8	1	0	—		—		23	8
Krasnodar	2015–16	Russian Premier League	29	20	3	1	12	3	—		44	24
Krasnodar	2016–17	Russian Premier League	22	18	1	1	8	6	—		31	25
Krasnodar	2017–18	Russian Premier League	22	14	0	0	2	0	—		24	14
Krasnodar	2018–19	Russian Premier League	2	1	0	0	0	0	—		2	1
Krasnodar	Total		75	53	4	2	22	9	—		101	64
Lokomotiv Moscow	2018–19	Russian Premier League	22	6	4	1	3 (Note: Appearances in UEFA Champions League)	0	—		29	7
Lokomotiv Moscow	2019–20	Russian Premier League	14	3	0	0	4	0	1 (Note: Appearance in Russian Super Cup)	1	19	4
Lokomotiv Moscow	2020–21	Russian Premier League	21	7	3	4	3	0	1	0	28	11
Lokomotiv Moscow	2021–22	Russian Premier League	15	7	0	0	6	0	1	0	22	7
Lokomotiv Moscow	Total		72	23	7	5	16	0	3	1	98	29
Celta Vigo (loan)	2019–20	La Liga	14	2	0	0	—		—		14	2
Dynamo Moscow	2021–22	Russian Premier League	11	5	4	2	—		—		15	7
Dynamo Moscow	2022–23	Russian Premier League	24	10	7	2	—		—		31	12
Dynamo Moscow	2023–24	Russian Premier League	25	4	9	2	—		—		34	6
Dynamo Moscow	Total		60	19	20	6	—		—		80	25
Krasnodar	2024–25	Russian Premier League	16	1	7	2	—		1	1	24	4
Career total			364	112	49	16	55	10	4	2	472	140

=== International ===
As of 14 November 2021

National team	Year	Apps	Goals
Russia
Russia	2012	1	1
Russia	2013	4	1
Russia	2015	5	2
Russia	2016	9	2
Russia	2017	9	5
Russia	2018	9	1
Russia	2019	2	2
Russia	2021	6	2
Total		45	16

Scores and results list Russia's goal tally first.

No.	Date	Venue	Opponent	Score	Result	Competition
1.	14 November 2012	Kuban Stadium, Krasnodar, Russia	United States	1–0	2–2	Friendly
2.	19 November 2013	Zabeel Stadium, Dubai, United Arab Emirates	South Korea	1–1	2–1	Friendly
3.	8 September 2015	Rheinpark Stadion, Vaduz, Liechtenstein	Liechtenstein	5–0	7–0	UEFA Euro 2016 qualification
4.	17 November 2015	Olimp-2, Rostov-on-Don, Russia	Croatia	1–0	1–3	Friendly
5.	26 March 2016	Otkritie Arena, Moscow, Russia	Lithuania	1–0	3–0	Friendly
6.	6 September 2016	Lokomotiv Stadium, Moscow, Russia	Ghana	1–0	1–0	Friendly
7.	5 June 2017	Groupama Arena, Budapest, Hungary	Hungary	1–0	3–0	Friendly
8.	17 June 2017	Krestovsky Stadium, Saint Petersburg, Russia	New Zealand	2–0	2–0	2017 FIFA Confederations Cup
9.	7 October 2017	VEB Arena, Moscow, Russia	South Korea	1–0	4–2	Friendly
10.	14 November 2017	Krestovsky Stadium, Saint Petersburg, Russia	Spain	1–2	3–3	Friendly
11.	14 November 2017	Krestovsky Stadium, Saint Petersburg, Russia	Spain	3–3	3–3	Friendly
12.	27 March 2018	Krestovsky Stadium, Saint Petersburg, Russia	France	1–2	1–3	Friendly
13.	8 June 2019	Mordovia Arena, Saransk, Russia	San Marino	7–0	9–0	UEFA Euro 2020 qualification
14.	8 June 2019	Mordovia Arena, Saransk, Russia	San Marino	8–0	9–0	UEFA Euro 2020 qualification
15.	7 September 2021	Otkritie Arena, Moscow, Russia	Malta	1–0	2–0	2022 FIFA World Cup qualification
16.	11 November 2021	Krestovsky Stadium, Saint Petersburg, Russia	Cyprus	2–0	6–0	2022 FIFA World Cup qualification

== Honours ==
Lokomotiv Moscow

- Russian Cup: 2018–19, 2020–21
- Russian Super Cup: 2019

Krasnodar

- Russian Premier League: 2024–25

Individual

- Russian Premier League top goalscorer: 2015–16, 2016–17
- Footballer of the Year in Russia (Sport-Express): 2015–16, 2016–17, 2017–18
- Best sports YouTube channel in The Bookmakers Ratings Awards: 2025
