= Dmitry Stotsky =

Russian footballer

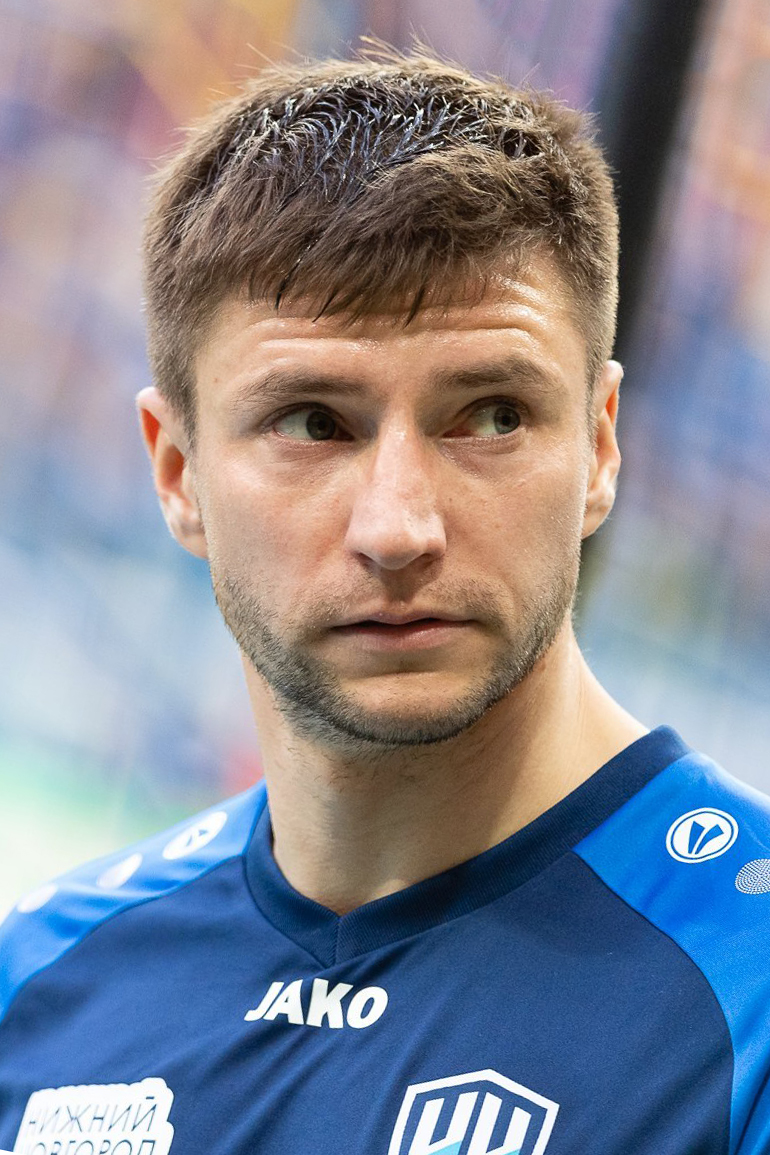
- Stotsky with Nizhny Novgorod in 2022

Personal information
- Full name: Dmitry Valeryevich Stotsky
- Date of birth: 1 December 1989 (age 36)
- Place of birth: Kaliningrad, Russian SFSR
- Height: 1.71 m (5 ft 7 in)
- Position: Right-back

Youth career
- 1996–2006: SDYuSSHoR-5 Yunost Kaliningrad
- 2006–2009: Baltika Kaliningrad

Senior career*
Years	Team	Apps	(Gls)
2008–2014	Baltika Kaliningrad	123	(8)
2010	→ Klaipėda (loan)	13	(1)
2015–2018	Ufa	97	(10)
2018–2022	Krasnodar	49	(2)
2022–2024	Pari NN	59	(5)
2024–2025	Ufa	20	(0)
2025	Chernomorets Novorossiysk	5	(0)

International career^{‡}
2018	Russia	1	(0)
- * Club domestic league appearances and goals as of 23 August 2025 ‡ National team caps and goals as of 10 September 2018

Dmitry Valeryevich Stotsky (Russian: Дми́трий Вале́рьевич Сто́цкий; born 1 December 1989) is a Russian former professional footballer. His current position is right-back, but he has been deployed to many other positions, including left-back and wide midfielder on either side.

== Club career ==
On 15 May 2018, Stotsky moved from FC Ufa to FC Krasnodar, signing a four-year contract. On 25 January 2022, his contract with Krasnodar was terminated by mutual consent. On the next day, he signed with Nizhny Novgorod. Stotsky left Pari NN in June 2024, as his contract expired.

He ended his professional career in September 2025.

== International ==
Stotsky made his debut for the Russia national team on 10 September 2018 in a friendly against Czech Republic.

== Career statistics ==
=== Club ===
As of match played 1 June 2024

Appearances and goals by club, season and competition
Club	Season	League			Cup		Continental		Other		Total	
Club	Season	Division	Apps	Goals	Apps	Goals	Apps	Goals	Apps	Goals	Apps	Goals
Baltika Kaliningrad	2009	Russian Football National League	1	0	0	0	–		–		1	0
Baltika Kaliningrad	2010	Russian Football National League	9	0	0	0	–		–		9	0
Baltika Kaliningrad	2011–12	Russian Football National League	30	4	1	0	–		–		31	4
Baltika Kaliningrad	2012–13	Russian Football National League	30	1	2	0	–		4 (Note: Appearances in the FNL Cup)	0	36	1
Baltika Kaliningrad	2013–14	Russian Football National League	33	2	1	1	–		–		34	3
Baltika Kaliningrad	2014–15	Russian Football National League	20	1	2	1	–		–		22	2
Baltika Kaliningrad	Total		123	8	6	2	0	0	4	0	133	10
Klaipėda (loan)	2010	A Lyga	13	1	0	0	–		–		13	1
Ufa	2014–15	Russian Premier League	10	2	–		–		–		10	2
Ufa	2015–16	Russian Premier League	30	2	1	0	–		–		31	2
Ufa	2016–17	Russian Premier League	29	3	3	0	–		–		32	3
Ufa	2017–18	Russian Premier League	28	3	1	0	–		–		29	3
Ufa	Total		97	10	5	0	0	0	0	0	102	10
Krasnodar	2018–19	Russian Premier League	25	1	4	0	8 (Note: Appearances in the UEFA Europa League)	0	–		37	1
Krasnodar	2019–20	Russian Premier League	12	0	1	0	4 (Note: Two appearances in the UEFA Champions League, two appearances in the UEFA Europa League)	0	–		17	0
Krasnodar	2020–21	Russian Premier League	6	1	0	0	0	0	–		6	1
Krasnodar	2021–22	Russian Premier League	6	0	2	0	–		–		8	0
Krasnodar	Total		49	2	7	0	12	0	0	0	68	2
Krasnodar-2	2020–21	Russian First League	1	0	–		–		–		1	0
Pari NN	2021–22	Russian Premier League	12	1	1	0	–		–		13	1
Pari NN	2022–23	Russian Premier League	25	2	3	0	–		–		28	2
Pari NN	2023–24	Russian Premier League	22	2	5	0	–		0	0	27	2
Pari NN	Total		59	5	9	0	0	0	0	0	68	5
Career total			342	26	27	2	12	0	4	0	385	28
