= Mansi people =

Indigenous ethnic group in Russia

Mansi
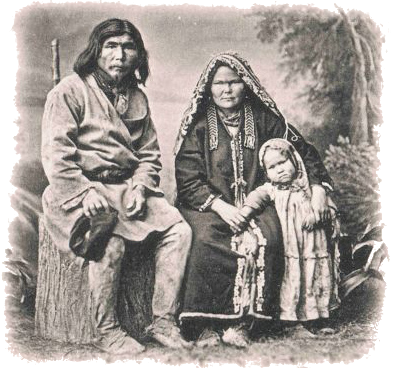
- Mansi family, 1901.

Total population
- 21,043 (2002)

Regions with significant populations
- Khanty-Mansi Autonomous Okrug (Russia)
- Russia: 21,000 (2002)

Languages
- Mansi, Russian

Religion
- Shamanism, Russian Orthodoxy

Related ethnic groups
- Khanty, Zabolotnie Tatars, peoples of the Volga-Ural region

The Mansi (Mansi: Ма̄ньщи / Мāньси / Мāньси мāхум, Māńsi / Māńsi māhum, [ˈmaːnʲsʲi, ˈmaːnʲsʲi ˈmaːxʊm]) are an Ob-Ugric indigenous people living in Khanty–Mansia, an autonomous okrug within Tyumen Oblast in Russia. In Khanty–Mansia, the Khanty and Mansi languages have co-official status with Russian. The Mansi language is one of the postulated Ugric languages of the Uralic family. The Mansi people were formerly known as the Voguls.

Together with the Khanty people, the Mansi are politically represented by the Association to Save Yugra, an organisation founded during Perestroika in the late 1980s. This organisation was among the first regional indigenous associations in Russia.

== Demographics ==
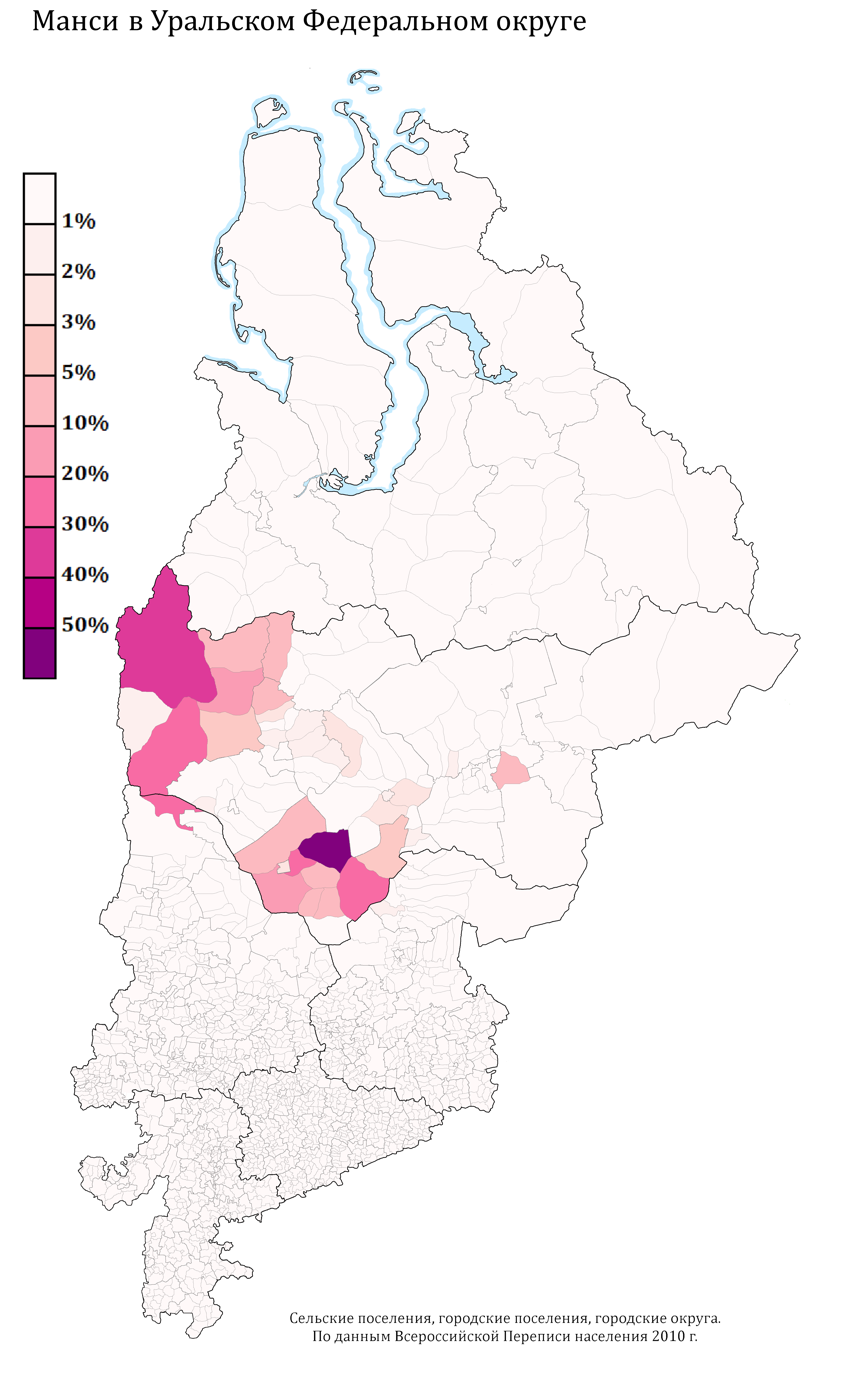
Settlement of Mansi in the Ural Federal District by urban and rural settlements in%, 2010 census

Mansi population according to 2021 census
	Total	Men	Women
Total	12,228	5,685	6,543
Tyumen Oblast	11,583	5,356	6,227
*Khanty-Mansi Autonomous Okrug	11,065	5,136	5,929
Sverdlovsk Oblast	334	170	164
Komi Republic	5	3	2

According to the 2021 census, there were 12,228 Mansi in Russia.

Historically the Mansi population was approximated as 6,000 in 1939 and 6,300 in 1926. A breakdown of the Mansi around the years 1900 to 1905 was recorded by linguist and ethnographer Artturi Kannisto, though excluding ethnic Mansi in regions / villages (e.g. along the Southern Sosva) where knowledge of the Mansi language had been fully lost:

Mansi population ca. 1905
Governorate	Region	Mansi people			Speakers of Mansi			Dialect group
Governorate	Region	Men	Women	Total	Men	Women	Total	Dialect group
Tobolsk	Konda	1026	1035	2061	1010	981	1991	Eastern Mansi
Tobolsk	Sosva	924	908	1832	924	908	1832	Northern Mansi
Tobolsk	Ob	184	182	366	184	182	366	Northern Mansi
Perm	Lozva	80	80	160	75	73	148	Northern Mansi (ca. 100); Western Mansi (ca. 40)
Tobolsk	Lozva	65	52	117	30	13	43	Western Mansi
Tobolsk	Pelymka	67	80	147	55	62	117	Western Mansi
Tobolsk	Vagilsk	52	39	91	40	24	64	Western Mansi
Tobolsk	Tavda	285	295	580	176	149	325	Southern Mansi
Total		2683	2671	5354	2494	2392	4886	

== History ==
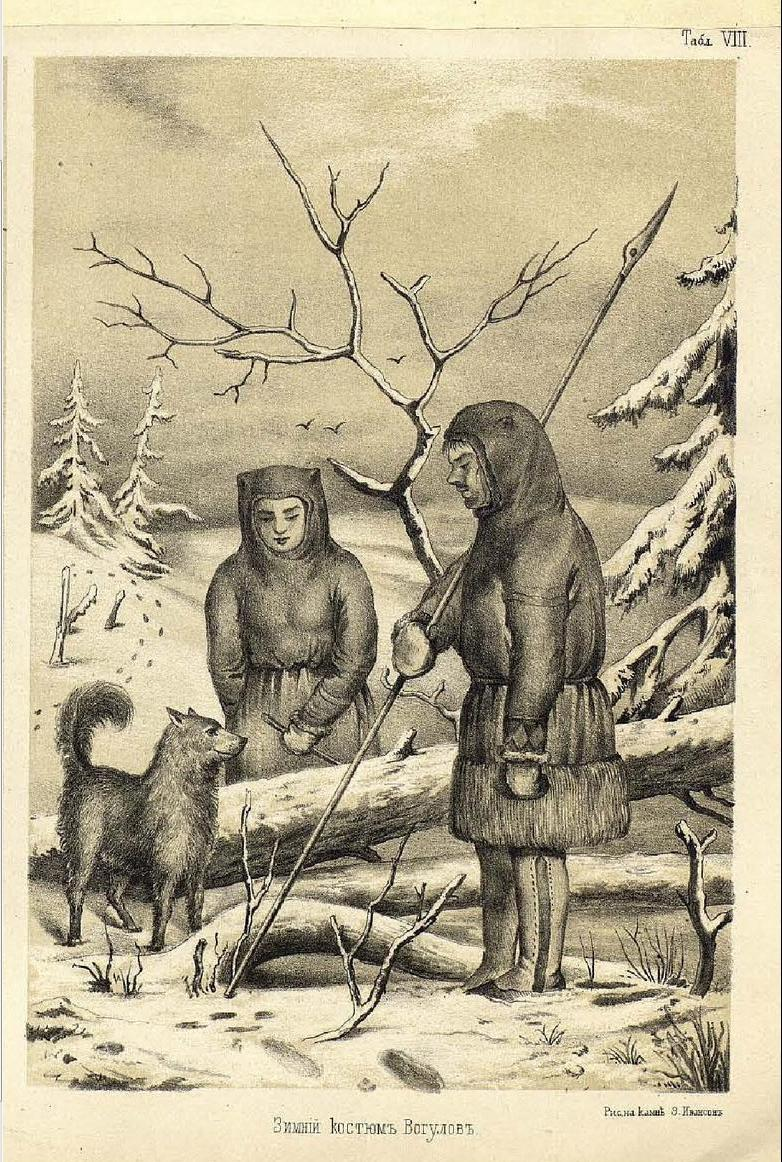
"Winter outfit of the Voguls" depicting Mansi people c. 1873

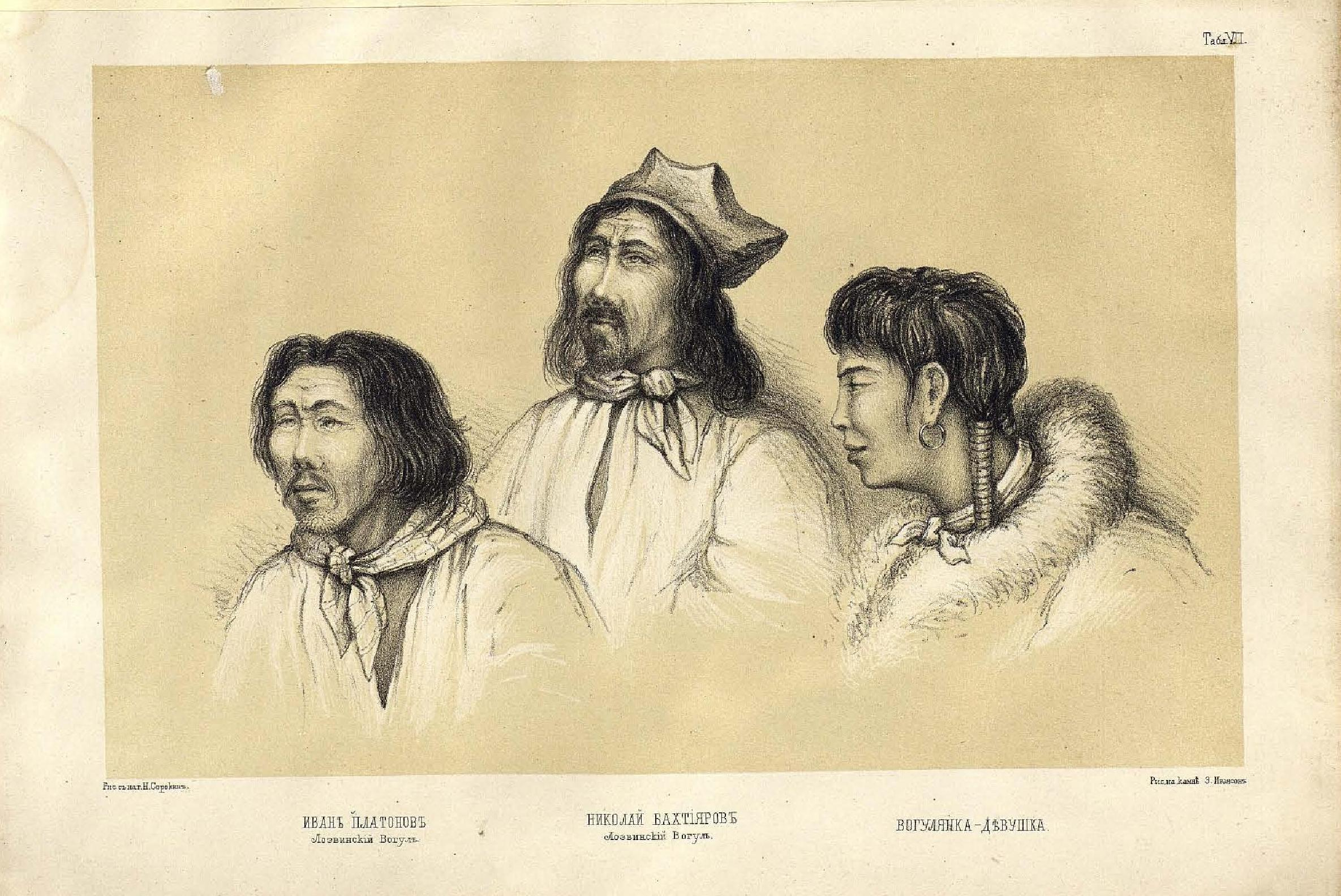
Voguls (Mansi) c. 1873

The ancestors of the Mansi populated the areas west of the Urals. Mansi findings have been unearthed in the vicinity of Perm. In the first millennium BC, they expanded to Western Siberia, where they assimilated with the native inhabitants. Other researchers say that the Khanty originated in the south Ural steppe and moved northwards into their current location in about 500 AD.

As per the Primary Chronicle, Uleb Ragnvaldsson, the posadnik of Novgorod, led a war party to conquer Yugra, the historical homeland of the Khanty (Ostyaks) and Mansi (Voguls). Ragnvaldsson was defeated near Syktyvkar, as the Mansi still inhabited large areas west of the Urals. This is one of the first records of Novgorod and later the unified Russian state claiming dominance over a land where they had no or negligible presence.

Some Russian historians claim that Yugra were subjugated during the 12th century, but historical records show that Russian power was only established in the middle of the 18th century. Most likely, the Khanty were not initially aware they had been claimed as subjects of Novgorod or Russia, and their "new" masters were not aware of who their subordinates were.

During the Middle Ages, it is possible that the Mansi considered the eastern territories of the Novgorod Republic and the Grand Principality of Moscow as their own. Russian folklore identifies the people of Yugra as being bloodthirsty, as natives of Yugra may have made raids into areas controlled by Novgorod or Moscow. The 15th to 17th centuries were the height of the Mansi conducting war parties on Russian lands. The Mansi principalities' leaders had sworn allegiance to the Russian tsar; however they did interpret this differently from the Russians. Mansi lords used these sworn allegiances to convince local Mansi populations that they were direct subjects of the Russian supreme leader, and hence had full right to punish Russian nobility for their wrongdoings. Raids and war parties against Russian nobility created confusion in the regions near the Ural Mountains. As a result, they were also popular with Russian peasants, as they gave them freedom to improve their lives by stealing with a "permit" from the tsar whatever they wished from the nobility.

During the 15th and 17th centuries, there were many conflicts among natives of Yugra in which sometimes Moscow was involved, but from the 17th century, Russia became the dominant power. There were many conflicts where the Mansi fought against the Khanty, Nenets, Tatars or Russians, changing allies as fit their needs.

The Mansi were divided into principalities such as Kondia. In the 15th and 16th century, these were divided into three categories: central, southern and northern. The central principalities were partially included in the Grand Principality of Moscow, while some southern principalities were subjects of the Siberian Khanate, and the northern principalities were independent as knowledge of them was limited outside of the region. At the end of the 16th century, Russia made the decision to conquer the principalities. The push came under the Russian Cossack Yermak, and its influence reached the natives in the Obi River region, starting a time of troubles lasting until the reign of Peter the Great in the 18th century. It took until the end of the 17th century for the Russians to reach every corner of their claimed areas. This resulted in number of wars between Mansi principalities and the Russians.

Kondia was the most powerful principality in Yugra in the 17th century, as it was still de facto independent at the beginning of the 18th century. During that period, there was an attempt to Christianize the Mansi and others living in the same region. Kondia raised an army of several hundred men and drove the missionaries out from their lands. Kondia was also unique in that it did not pay the yasak tax until 1620, when Russia started demanding it from them.

In 1609, the leadership of Kondia planned to push Russia out from Siberia and attacked Beryozovo. To increase their chances of success, alliances with other principalities, including Khanty principalities, were considered. Finally with the Obdorski, Belogorje and Sosva principalities, an attack was made on Beryozovo. The alliance with Khanty-run Obdorski may have been influenced by the fact that Obdorski destroyed a Russian war party in the tundra in 1600. The war was not successful and the Russians pushed for a change of leadership in Kondia. The noblewoman Anna stepped down but continued to rule behind the scenes through her son and grandson. As a result, the Russian yasak was not paid until 1620, when Russia started demanding it specifically. Peace did not last long, as the Khanty nobility formed another alliance with Khanty nobleman Mamruk to drive the Russians away. Another conflict began in 1611–1612, when Kondia started another war to drive the Russians out, unsuccessfully.

Kinema and Sueta, rulers of the Bardak principality, whose area is located in the present-day town of Surgut, attacked the village of Surgut in 1691. They stole the funds of the local administration and panic broke out in Surgut. The funds stolen had come from taxing the Nenets, as local Mansi were either excluded from paying taxes or chose to ignore taxes. The Russians responded to this offence by liquidating the principality and enforcing taxes on all the residents.

The last conflict between the Mansi and the Russian state was the Kazym rebellion in 1931–1934, where natives of Khanty-Mansi Autonomous Okrug rebelled. The rebellion was crushed by the Red Army. This was the last known conflict between Russia and any of the Siberian tribes.

=== Relationship with historical Magyar conquerors ===
The Mansi are one of the closest linguistic relatives of modern Hungarians. Genetic data by Maroti et al. revealed high genetic affinity between Magyar conquerors and modern day Volga Tatars and Bashkirs, with both being modeled as ~50% Mansi-like, ~35% Sarmatian-like, and ~15% Hun/Xiongnu-like. The admixture event is suggested to have taken place in the Southern Ural region in 643–431 BC.

== Culture ==
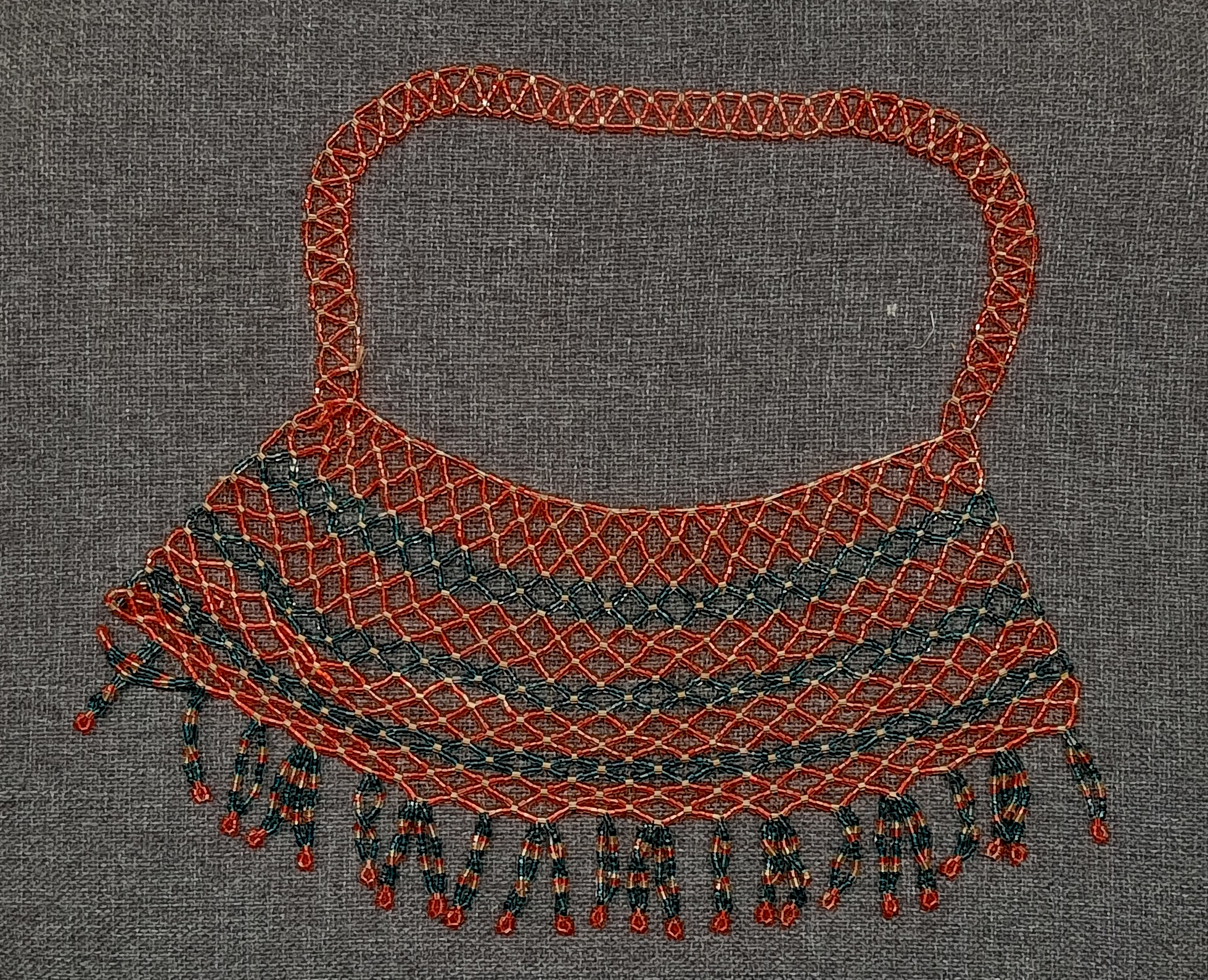
Mansi chestpiece, made out of stained glass beads, from the University of Szeged's Department of Finno-Ugric Linguistics

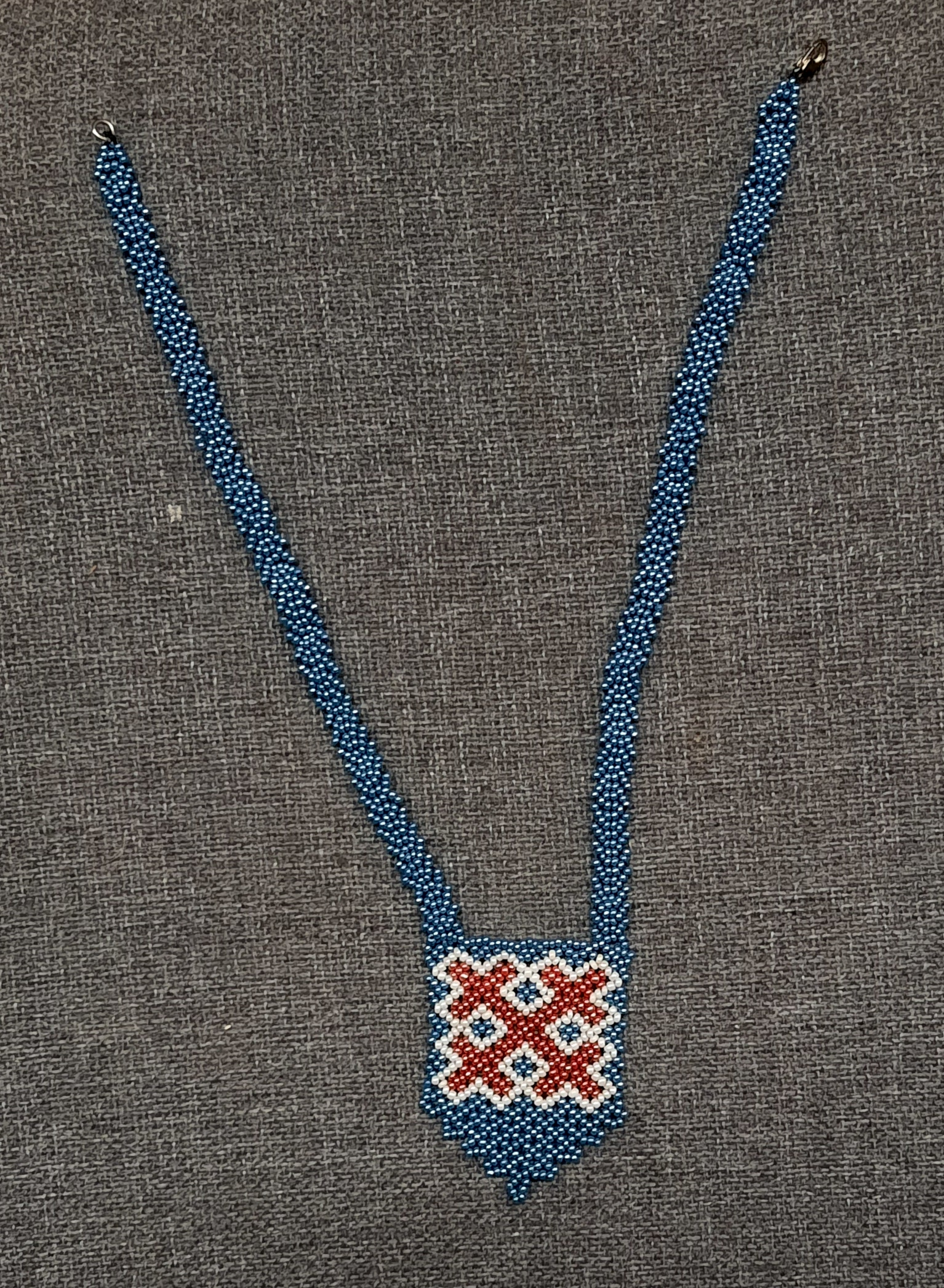
Mansi necklace

The Mansi share many similarities with the Khanty people, and together they are called the Ob-Ugric peoples. Their languages are closely related but clearly distinct from each other.

=== Traditional livelihood ===
The Mansi were semi-nomadic hunters and fishermen. Some Mansi also raised reindeer. A few Mansi engaged in agriculture (cultivating barley) and raised cattle and horses.

During the winter, the Mansi lived in stationary huts made out of earth and branches at permanent villages. During the spring, the Mansi moved towards hunting and fishing grounds, where they constructed temporary rectangular-shaped shelters out of birch bark and poles.

Weapons used by the Mansi were advanced for the period and included longbows, arrows, spears. They also wore iron helmets and chain mail.

=== Folk culture ===
A notable part of the traditional Mansi religion is the bear cult. A bear celebration is held in connection with the bear hunt (a similar concept to the Finnish peijaiset); it lasts for several days and involves songs, dances and plays. Mansi folklore also includes mythical and heroic stories and fate songs, which are biographical poems.

An example of the traditional material culture of Ob-Ugric peoples is ornamenting leather clothing and birch bark objects with mosaics.

== Genetics ==
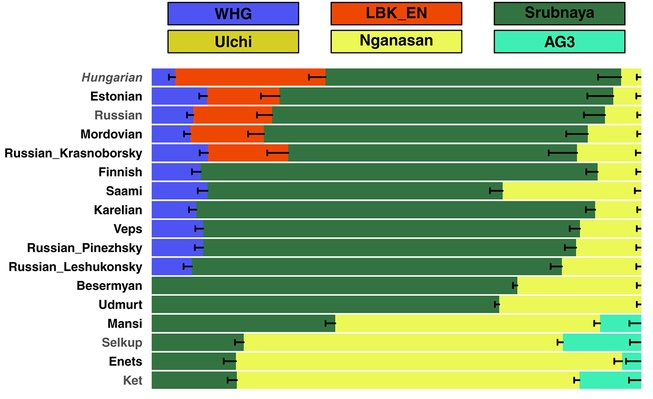
Estimated ancestry components among selected Eurasian populations. The yellow component represents Neo-Siberian ancestry (represented by Nganasans).

=== Y-DNA ===
The majority of Mansi men carry haplogroup N, which is commonly found among Uralic-speaking peoples. In Tambets et al, 2018, 60% of them carry its subclade N1b-P43 and 16% belong to subclade N1c. There is also an incidence of R1a at 19%, in one sample, indicating long contacts with Indo-European speakers, these samples being related to some of the R1a in Hungarians.

=== mtDNA ===
The maternal lineages among Mansi are more heterogeneous. The most common mitochondrial DNA haplogroup for Mansi is U, as about one in four has it. Most of them (16.6%) belong to its subgroup U4. Other haplogroups include C (18.6%), H (15.1%), J (13.1%) and D (12.6%).

=== Autosomal DNA ===
According to a 2019 study, in addition to having a high level of East Eurasian-like ancestry, the Mansi have also West Eurasian admixture. Their admixture can be modelled to be about 60% Bronze Age Baikal Lake-like and 40% Srubnaya-like, or about 54% Nganasan-like and about 38% Srubnaya-like, with additional ANE-related admixture.

In a 2018 study, Mansi samples showed variation in the amounts of West and East Eurasian admixtures. Some of them clustered with the Khanty, while outlier samples had additional West Eurasian admixture, making them closer to Uralic-speakers from the Volga-Ural region.

== Notable Mansi ==
- Matrena Pankratyevna Vakhrusheva (1918–2000), linguist, philologist, writer; co-wrote the first Mansi-Russian dictionary
- Yuvan Nikolayevich Shestalov (1937–2011), writer
- Ruslan Mikhailovich Provodnikov (b. 1984), boxer (Mansi mother)
- Sergey Aleksandrovich Ustiugov (b. 1992), cross-country skier (Mansi father)
