= 2018–19 FC Krasnodar season =

FC Krasnodar
2018–19 season
- Chairman: Sergey Galitsky
- Manager: Murad Musayev (caretaker)
- Stadium: Krasnodar Stadium
- Russian Premier League: 3rd
- Russian Cup: Quarter-final
- UEFA Europa League: Round of 16
- Top goalscorer: League: Viktor Claesson (12); All: Viktor Claesson (15)
Home colours	Away colours	Third colours

The 2018–19 FC Krasnodar season was the eighth successive season that Krasnodar played in the Russian Premier League, the highest tier of association football in Russia. They finished the previous season in 4th place, and as a result of FC Tosno failing to obtain a UEFA licence for their 2018–19 UEFA Europa League Group Stage spot, they qualified directly for the Groups Stage of the UEFA Europa League.

== Season events ==
Dmitry Stotsky was Krasnodar's first summer signing, penning a four-year contract on 15 May, with Uroš Spajić becoming the second summer signing 11 days later, when he signed a five-year contract on 26 May.

On 9 July, German Onugkha signed from Volgar Astrakhan on a four-year contract, whilst Ivan Taranov signed a one-year contract on 11 July. On 13 July, Nikolay Markov returned to Krasnodar, signing a one-year contract. 6 days later, 19 July, Krasnodar announced the signing of Christian Cueva on a four-year contract.

On 10 August, Krasnodar announced the signing of Jón Fjóluson on a three-year contract.

Following Pavel Mamayev's arrest for assault in October, Krasnodar announced that they had imposed the maximum fine they could on Mamayev, removed him from first team training and were investigating how to terminate his contract.

On 27 November, Viktor Claesson extended his contract with Krasnodar until the end of June 2021.

On 28 May, Alyaksandr Martynovich, Cristian Ramírez, Yury Gazinsky and Ari all signed new contracts with the club.

== Squad ==
As of match played 26 May 2019

Number	Name	Nationality	Position	Date of birth (age)	Signed from	Signed in	Contract ends	Apps.	Goals
Goalkeepers
1	Stanislav Kritsyuk	(Russia)	GK	1 December 1990 (aged 28)	Braga	2016	2020	66	0
39	Matvei Safonov	(Russia)	GK	25 February 1999 (aged 20)	Academy	2016		23	0
88	Andrei Sinitsyn	(Russia)	GK	23 June 1988 (aged 30)	Yenisey Krasnoyarsk	2012		103	0
Defenders
3	Jón Fjóluson	(Iceland)	DF	10 April 1989 (aged 30)	IFK Norrköping	2018	2021	11	0
4	Alyaksandr Martynovich	(Belarus)	DF	26 August 1987 (aged 31)	Dinamo Minsk	2010		197	4
5	Uroš Spajić	(Serbia)	DF	13 February 1993 (aged 26)	Anderlecht	2018	2023	39	0
6	Cristian Ramírez	(Ecuador)	DF	12 August 1994 (aged 24)	Ferencvárosi	2017		75	0
15	Nikolay Markov	(Russia)	DF	20 April 1985 (aged 34)	Kuban Krasnodar	2018	2019	97	3
22	Ivan Taranov	(Russia)	DF	22 June 1986 (aged 32)	Krylia Sovetov	2018	2019	1	0
47	Daniil Utkin	(Russia)	DF	12 October 1999 (aged 19)	Academy	2018		9	1
50	Artyom Golubev	(Russia)	DF	21 January 1999 (aged 20)	Academy	2018		5	0
98	Sergei Petrov	(Russia)	DF	2 January 1991 (aged 28)	Krylia Sovetov	2013		181	10
Midfielders
7	Wanderson	(Brazil)	MF	7 October 1994 (aged 24)	Red Bull Salzburg	2017		73	10
8	Yury Gazinsky	(Russia)	MF	20 July 1989 (aged 29)	Torpedo Moscow	2013		217	10
11	Dmitri Skopintsev	(Russia)	MF	2 March 1997 (aged 22)	Rostov	2019		9	1
14	Kristoffer Olsson	(Sweden)	MF	30 June 1995 (aged 23)	AIK	2019		11	0
16	Viktor Claesson	(Sweden)	MF	2 January 1992 (aged 27)	IF Elfsborg	2017	2021	94	32
17	Pavel Mamayev	(Russia)	MF	17 September 1988 (aged 30)	CSKA Moscow	2013		122	30
33	Mauricio Pereyra	(Uruguay)	MF	15 March 1990 (aged 29)	Lanús	2013		196	29
77	Charles Kaboré	(Burkina Faso)	MF	9 February 1988 (aged 31)	Kuban Krasnodar	2016		124	2
89	Dmitry Stotsky	(Russia)	MF	1 December 1989 (aged 29)	Ufa	2018	2022	37	1
Forwards
9	Ari	(Russia)	FW	11 December 1985 (aged 33)	Spartak Moscow	2013		136	44
85	Ivan Ignatyev	(Russia)	FW	6 January 1999 (aged 20)	Academy	2015		35	12
93	Magomed-Shapi Suleymanov	(Russia)	FW	16 December 1999 (aged 19)	Academy	2015		38	12
Away on loan
11	Ilya Zhigulyov	(Russia)	MF	1 February 1996 (aged 23)	Academy	2012		23	0
20	Christian Cueva	(Peru)	MF	23 November 1991 (aged 27)	São Paulo	2018	2022	23	1
41	Aleksei Tatayev	(Russia)	MF	8 October 1998 (aged 20)	Academy	2015		0	0
49	Roman Shishkin	(Russia)	DF	27 January 1987 (aged 32)	Lokomotiv Moscow	2017		35	1
90	Stefan Strandberg	(Norway)	DF	25 July 1990 (aged 28)	Rosenborg	2015		29	0
	Leo Goglichidze	(Russia)	DF	29 April 1997 (aged 22)	Academy	2013		1	0
	Aleksei Gritsayenko	(Russia)	DF	25 May 1995 (aged 24)	Luch Vladivostok	2017		11	1
	Vitali Stezhko	(Russia)	DF	29 January 1997 (aged 22)	Academy	2014		0	0
	Daniil Fomin	(Russia)	MF	2 March 1997 (aged 22)	Academy	2013		1	0
	Oleg Lanin	(Russia)	MF	22 January 1996 (aged 23)	Academy	2012		1	0
	Andrei Ivan	(Romania)	FW	4 January 1997 (aged 22)	Universitatea Craiova	2017		9	0
	German Onugkha	(Russia)	FW	6 July 1996 (aged 22)	Volgar Astrakhan	2018	2022	0	0
Players who left during the season
10	Fyodor Smolov	(Russia)	FW	9 February 1990 (aged 29)	Dynamo Moscow	2015		101	64
13	Ihor Kalinin	(Ukraine)	DF	11 November 1995 (aged 23)	Volgar Astrakhan	2018		2	0
23	Anatoli Katrich	(Russia)	MF	9 July 1994 (aged 24)	Dynamo Moscow	2018		1	0
70	Tornike Okriashvili	(Georgia (country))	MF	12 February 1992 (aged 27)	Genk	2016		20	3
	Mihailo Ristić	(Serbia)	MF	31 October 1995 (aged 23)	Red Star Belgrade	2017		8	0
	Nikolay Komlichenko	(Russia)	FW	29 June 1995 (aged 23)	Academy	2013		6	0

=== Out on loan ===
Note: Flags indicate national team as defined under FIFA eligibility rules; some limited exceptions apply. Players may hold more than one non-FIFA nationality.

No.	Pos.	Nation	Player
—	DF	RUS	Leo Goglichidze (at Nizhny Novgorod until 30 June 2019)
—	DF	RUS	Aleksei Gritsayenko (at Yenisey Krasnoyarsk until 30 June 2019)
—	DF	RUS	Vitali Stezhko (at Pyunik until 30 June 2019)
—	DF	RUS	Aleksei Tatayev (at Mladá Boleslav until 30 June 2019)
—	DF	RUS	Roman Shishkin (at Krylia Sovetov Samara until 30 June 2019)
—	DF	NOR	Stefan Strandberg (at Ural Yekaterinburg until 30 June 2019)

No.	Pos.	Nation	Player
—	MF	PER	Christian Cueva (at Santos until 31 January 2020)
—	MF	RUS	Daniil Fomin (at Nizhny Novgorod until 30 June 2019)
—	MF	RUS	Oleg Lanin (at Khimki until 30 June 2019)
—	MF	RUS	Ilya Zhigulyov (at Ural Yekaterinburg until 30 June 2019)
—	FW	ROU	Andrei Ivan (at Rapid Wien until 30 June 2019)

== Transfers ==
=== In ===
Date	Position	Nationality	Name	From	Fee	Ref.
15 May 2018	MF	(Russia)	Dmitry Stotsky	Ufa	Undisclosed	
26 May 2018	DF	(Serbia)	Uroš Spajić	Anderlecht	Undisclosed	
8 July 2018	MF	(Russia)	Anatoli Katrich	Dynamo Moscow	Undisclosed	
9 July 2018	FW	(Russia)	German Onugkha	Volgar Astrakhan	Undisclosed	
11 July 2018	DF	(Russia)	Ivan Taranov	Krylia Sovetov	Undisclosed	
13 July 2018	DF	(Russia)	Nikolay Markov	Kuban Krasnodar	Free	
19 July 2018	MF	(Peru)	Christian Cueva	São Paulo	Undisclosed	
10 August 2018	DF	(Iceland)	Jón Fjóluson	IFK Norrköping	Undisclosed	
7 January 2019	MF	(Sweden)	Kristoffer Olsson	AIK	Undisclosed	
19 February 2019	MF	(Russia)	Dmitri Skopintsev	Rostov	Undisclosed	

=== Out ===
Date	Position	Nationality	Name	To	Fee	Ref.
29 May 2018	MF	(Russia)	Vyacheslav Podberyozkin	Rubin Kazan	Undisclosed	
27 June 2018	MF	(Russia)	Aleksandr Morgunov	Khimki	Undisclosed	
27 June 2018	FW	(Russia)	Ilya Belous	Khimki	Undisclosed	
16 July 2018	FW	(Russia)	Ruslan Bolov	Khimki	Undisclosed	
9 August 2018	FW	(Russia)	Fyodor Smolov	Lokomotiv Moscow	Undisclosed	
12 January 2019	MF	(Serbia)	Mihailo Ristić	Montpellier	Undisclosed	
30 January 2019	FW	(Russia)	Nikolay Komlichenko	Mladá Boleslav	Undisclosed	

=== Loans out ===
Date from	Position	Nationality	Name	To	Date to	Ref.
24 June 2018	FW	(Romania)	Andrei Ivan	Rapid Wien	End of Season	
4 July 2018	DF	(Russia)	Vitali Stezhko	Pyunik	End of Season	
14 July 2018	DF	(Russia)	Aleksei Gritsayenko	Yenisey Krasnoyarsk	End of Season	
30 August 2018	MF	(Russia)	Ilya Zhigulyov	Ural Yekaterinburg	End of Season	
10 January 2019	DF	(Russia)	Aleksei Tatayev	Mladá Boleslav	End of Season	
13 January 2019	DF	(Russia)	Roman Shishkin	Krylia Sovetov	End of Season	
17 January 2019	DF	(Norway)	Stefan Strandberg	Ural Yekaterinburg	End of Season	
21 January 2019	MF	(Russia)	Oleg Lanin	Khimki	End of Season	
8 February 2019	MF	(Peru)	Christian Cueva	Santos	31 January 2020	

=== Released ===
Date	Position	Nationality	Name	Joined	Date
31 May 2018	DF	(Russia)	Ivan Takhmazov	Akademiya Futbola Rostov-on-Don	
31 May 2018	DF	(Sweden)	Andreas Granqvist	Helsingborg	
31 May 2018	MF	(Brazil)	Joãozinho	Dynamo Moscow	23 July 2018
31 May 2018	MF	(Colombia)	Ricardo Laborde	Anorthosis Famagusta	23 July 2018
24 July 2018	DF	(Russia)	Renat Yanbayev		
3 August 2018	DF	(Ukraine)	Ihor Kalinin	Rubin Kazan	20 September 2018
17 December 2018	MF	(Georgia (country))	Tornike Okriashvili	Anorthosis Famagusta	
20 December 2018	MF	(Russia)	Anatoli Katrich	Ural Yekaterinburg	22 February 2019
31 May 2019	DF	(Burkina Faso)	Charles Kaboré	Dynamo Moscow	17 July 2019
31 May 2019	DF	(Uruguay)	Mauricio Pereyra	Orlando City	31 July 2019

== Friendlies ==
14 January 2018	Krasnodar (Russia)	2 – 0	China U25	Marbella, Spain
18:00 MSK (UTC+3)	Suleymanov 45', 80'	Report		Stadium: Dame de Noche Football Centre; Attendance: 100; Referee: H.Gallegos

22 January 2018	Krasnodar (Russia)	0 – 2	(Switzerland) Basel	Marbella, Spain
18:00 MSK (UTC+3)	Ari (yellow card) 35'; Kaboré (yellow card) 35'; Ignatyev (yellow card) 65'	Report	Zambrano (yellow card) 38'; Bua 50'; Balanta 66' (yellow card) 70'	Stadium: Dame de Noche Football Centre; Attendance: 120; Referee: P.Muñoz

29 January 2018	Krasnodar (Russia)	1 – 1	(China) Beijing Renhe	Marbella, Spain
MSK (UTC+3)	Suleymanov 81'	Report	Diop 18'	Stadium: Dame de Noche Football Centre; Attendance: 120; Referee: A.Barba-Chamorra

3 February 2018	Krasnodar (Russia)	2 – 0	(United States) New England Revolution	Marbella, Spain
13:00 MSK (UTC+3)	Gazinsky (yellow card) 44'; Suleymanov 49', 73'	Report	Zahibo (yellow card) 44'; Fagúndez (yellow card) 54'	Stadium: Dame de Noche Football Centre; Attendance: 200; Referee: D.Duran

3 February 2018	Krasnodar (Russia)	2 – 0	(Sweden) Malmö	Marbella, Spain
14:00 MSK (UTC+3)	Claesson 82'; Ari 88' (pen.)	Report		Stadium: Dame de Noche Football Centre; Attendance: 300; Referee: Martin

6 February 2018	Krasnodar (Russia)	1 – 0	(Russia) Lokomotiv Moscow	Marbella, Spain
18:00 MSK (UTC+3)	Ignatyev 84'	Report		Stadium: Dame de Noche Football Centre; Attendance: 200; Referee: R.Chavet

== Competitions ==
=== Russian Premier League ===
==== Results by round ====
Round	1	2	3	4	5	6	7	8	9	10	11	12	13	14	15	16	17	18	19	20	21	22	23	24	25	26	27	28	29	30
Ground	A	A	A	H	A	H	A	A	H	A	H	A	H	H	H	H	H	A	H	A	H	H	A	H	A	H	A	A	A	H
Result	L	W	W	L	D	W	W	W	W	L	L	W	D	W	W	W	D	D	D	L	W	W	D	L	D	W	D	W	W	W
Position	12	7	4	5	6	5	4	2	2	2	2	2	3	2	2	2	2	2	2	4	3	2	3	3	4	3	3	3	3	3

Updated to match(es) played on 26 May 2019. Source: See Results
A = Away; H = Home; W = Win; D = Draw; L = Loss

==== Results ====
29 July 2018 1	Rubin Kazan	2 – 1	Krasnodar	Kazan
19:00 MSK (UTC+3)	Azmoun 9', 38'; Mogilevets (yellow card) 39'	Report	Smolov 31'; Spajić (yellow card) 43'	Stadium: Kazan Arena; Attendance: 13,884; Referee: Kirill Levnikov

4 August 2018 2	Ural Yekaterinburg	1 – 2	Krasnodar	Yekaterinburg
14:00 MSK (UTC+3)	Bicfalvi 6'; Yemelyanov (yellow card) 37'; Dimitrov (yellow card) 81'	Report	Kaboré (yellow card) 26'; Claesson 48'; Spajić (yellow card) 53'; Ramírez (yellow card) 86'; Mamayev 89'	Stadium: Central Stadium; Attendance: 20,326; Referee: Vasiliy Kazartsev

13 August 2018 3	Ufa	0 – 1	Krasnodar	Ufa
17:30 MSK (UTC+3)	Carp (yellow card) 29'; Vaněk (yellow card) 37'	Report	Ramírez (yellow card) 35' (yellow-red card) 90+3'; Wanderson 86'	Stadium: Neftyanik Stadium; Attendance: 7,016; Referee: Aleksei Matyunin

18 August 2018 4	Krasnodar	0 – 1	Spartak Moscow	Krasnodar
19:00 MSK (UTC+3)	Stotsky (yellow card) 45+1'; Ari (yellow card) 85' (red card) 90+1'	Report	Fernando (yellow card) 55'; Tashayev (yellow card) 72'; Zé Luís 88'	Stadium: Krasnodar Stadium; Attendance: 34,302; Referee: Sergey Lapochkin

26 August 2018 5	Orenburg	1 – 1	Krasnodar	Orenburg
14:00 MSK (UTC+3)	Kozlov 22'	Report	Spajić (yellow card) 44'; Kaboré (yellow card) 57'; Stotsky (yellow card) 66'; Suleymanov 88'	Stadium: Gazovik Stadium; Attendance: 7,083; Referee: Sergei Karasev

1 September 2018 6	Krasnodar	2 – 1	Lokomotiv Moscow	Krasnodar
19:00 MSK (UTC+3)	Wanderson 39' (yellow card) 60'; Mamayev (yellow card) 53'; Spajić (yellow card) 67'; Ramírez (yellow card) 87'; Suleymanov 90+3'	Report	Fernandes 33' (pen.)	Stadium: Krasnodar Stadium; Attendance: 25,714; Referee: Vladislav Bezborodov

16 September 2018 7	Anzhi Makhachkala	0 – 4	Krasnodar	Kaspiysk
16:30 MSK (UTC+3)	Khamdamov (yellow card) 54'; Belorukov (yellow card) 70'; Savichev (yellow card) 78'	Report	Wanderson 9'; Claesson 16'; Mamayev 58'; Ignatyev 82'; Suleymanov (yellow card) 87'	Stadium: Anzhi Arena; Attendance: 4,270; Referee: Sergey Ivanov

24 September 2018 8	Krylia Sovetov	0 – 3	Krasnodar	Samara
18:30 MSK (UTC+3)	Rogel (yellow card) 30'; Mijailović (yellow card) 32'; Tkachuk (yellow card) 36'	Report	Gazinsky (yellow card) 10'; Spajić (yellow card) 24'; Ari 69', 71'; Suleymanov 81'	Stadium: Samara Arena; Attendance: 17,198; Referee: Aleksei Matyunin

30 September 2018 9	Krasnodar	3 – 0	Dynamo Moscow	Krasnodar
16:30 MSK (UTC+3)	Ari 18'; Claesson 45+1', 55'	Report	Holmén (yellow card) 24'; Šunjić (yellow card) 35'; Rykov (yellow card) 42'; Rausch (yellow card) 69'	Stadium: Krasnodar Stadium; Attendance: 30,124; Referee: Roman Galimov

7 October 2018 10	Zenit St.Petersburg	2 – 1	Krasnodar	Saint Petersburg
16:30 MSK (UTC+3)	Kuzyayev (yellow card) 17'; Dzyuba 50'; Mak 65'; Neto (yellow card) 78'; Ivanović (yellow card) 80'; Paredes (yellow card) 83'	Report	Martynovich (yellow card) 14'; Stotsky (yellow card) 39'; Gazinsky (yellow card) 48'; Mamayev 81' (pen.); Petrov (red card) 85'; Claesson (yellow card) 90+1'	Stadium: Krestovsky Stadium; Attendance: 52,576; Referee: Aleksei Eskov

21 October 2018 11	Krasnodar	0 – 1	Akhmat Grozny	Krasnodar
19:00 MSK (UTC+3)	Spajić (yellow card) 48'; Gazinsky (yellow card) 67'; Pereyra (yellow card) 80'	Report	Rodolfo (yellow card) 36'; Gashchenkov (yellow card) 37'; Semyonov (yellow card) 42'; Ismael 60' (yellow card) 61'; Gorodov (yellow card) 87'	Stadium: Krasnodar Stadium; Attendance: 22,628; Referee: Vitali Meshkov

28 October 2018 12	CSKA Moscow	1 – 2	Krasnodar	Moscow
18:00 MSK (UTC+3)	Chernov (yellow card) 27'; Vlašić 54'	Report	Ari 79'; Claesson 81'	Stadium: VEB Arena; Attendance: 19,063; Referee: Roman Galimov

4 November 2018 13	Krasnodar	2 – 2	Rostov	Krasnodar
16:30 MSK (UTC+3)	Ari 16', 72'; Pereyra (yellow card) 56'; Stotsky (yellow card) 90+5'	Report	Shomurodov 7'; Ingason 81'; Parshivlyuk (yellow card) 90+5'	Stadium: Krasnodar Stadium; Attendance: 34,652; Referee: Mikhail Vilkov

11 November 2018 14	Krasnodar	3 – 0	Yenisey Krasnoyarsk	Krasnodar
16:00 MSK (UTC+3)	Spajić (yellow card) 22'; Gazinsky 60'; Claesson 70'; Kaboré 85'	Report	Torbinski (yellow card) 18'	Stadium: Krasnodar Stadium; Attendance: 15,167; Referee: Aleksei Eskov

25 November 2018 15	Krasnodar	3 – 0	Arsenal Tula	Krasnodar
16:30 MSK (UTC+3)	Wanderson 40'; Kaboré (yellow card) 41' (yellow-red card) 88'; Ignatyev 48'; Suleymanov 76'	Report	Đorđević (yellow card) 4'; Belyayev (yellow card) 45'; Bakayev (yellow card) 53'	Stadium: Krasnodar Stadium; Attendance: 16,628; Referee: Sergei Karasev

2 December 2018 16	Krasnodar	2 – 0	Ural Yekaterinburg	Krasnodar
14:00 MSK (UTC+3)	Petrov (yellow card) 23'; Suleymanov 56' (yellow card) 69'; Cueva (yellow card) 61'; Ignatyev 76'; Claesson (yellow card) 88'	Report	Haroyan (yellow card) 22'	Stadium: Krasnodar Stadium; Attendance: 12,313; Referee: Sergey Ivanov

9 December 2018 17	Krasnodar	1 – 1	Ufa	Krasnodar
16:30 MSK (UTC+3)	Ignatyev 26'; Spajić (yellow card) 50'	Report	Thill 14'; Bizjak (yellow card) 61'; Carp (yellow card) 64'; Salatić (yellow card) 84'; Igboun (yellow card) 87'	Stadium: Krasnodar Stadium; Attendance: 21,167; Referee: Aleksei Eskov

3 March 2019 18	Spartak Moscow	1 – 1	Krasnodar	Moscow
19:00 MSK (UTC+3)	Zé Luís 14'; Hanni (yellow card) 33'	Report	Pereyra 26'; Martynovich (yellow card) 49' (yellow-red card) 90+4'; Kaboré (yellow card) 52'; Ari (yellow card) 76'	Stadium: Otkritie Arena; Attendance: 27,662; Referee: Kirill Levnikov

11 March 2019 19	Krasnodar	2 – 2	Orenburg	Krasnodar
19:30 MSK (UTC+3)	Ari (penalty missed) 10' 63'; Pereyra (yellow card) 23'; Skopintsev 73'; Suleymanov (yellow card) 86'	Report	Sutormin 41'; S.Kozlov (yellow card) 72'; Oyewole 89'	Stadium: Krasnodar Stadium; Attendance: 16,367; Referee: Aleksei Matyunin

17 March 2019 20	Lokomotiv Moscow	1 – 0	Krasnodar	Moscow
16:30 MSK (UTC+3)	An.Miranchuk 69' (pen.)	Report	Kaboré (yellow card) 63' (yellow-red card) 68'	Stadium: RZD Arena; Attendance: 16,274; Referee: Mikhail Vilkov

31 March 2019 21	Krasnodar	5 – 0	Anzhi Makhachkala	Krasnodar
19:00 MSK (UTC+3)	Wanderson 18'; Petrov (yellow card) 30'; Claesson 38' (pen.); Suleymanov 55', 70'; Ignatyev 67'	Report	Belov (yellow card) 42'; Zakirov (yellow card) 87'	Stadium: Krasnodar Stadium; Attendance: 23,256; Referee: Vladislav Bezborodov

6 April 2019 22	Krasnodar	1 – 0	Krylia Sovetov	Krasnodar
16:30 MSK (UTC+3)	Martynovich (yellow card) 52'; Petrov (yellow card) 63' (red card) 71'; Claesson 90+2' (pen.)	Report	Timofeyev (yellow card) 5'; Samardžić (yellow card) 30'; Poluyakhtov (yellow card) 63'; Burlak (yellow card) 90+1'	Stadium: Krasnodar Stadium; Attendance: 22,885; Referee: Aleksei Eskov

14 April 2019 23	Dynamo Moscow	1 – 1	Krasnodar	Khimki
14:00 MSK (UTC+3)	Markov (yellow card) 36' (goal) 77'; Lutsenko (yellow card) 43'; Sow (yellow card) 83'	Report	Kaboré (yellow card) 25'; Wanderson (yellow card) 41' (goal) 87'	Stadium: Arena Khimki; Attendance: 5,873; Referee: Evgeny Turbin

20 April 2019 24	Krasnodar	2 – 3	Zenit St.Petersburg	Krasnodar
21:00 MSK (UTC+3)	Ignatyev 25'; Pereyra (yellow card) 67' (goal) 90+1'; Suleymanov (yellow card) 85'	Report	Dzyuba 19', 90+5'; Rigoni (yellow card) 35'; Smolnikov (yellow card) 45'; Rakitskiy (yellow card) 47' (goal) 69'; Barrios (yellow card) 71'; Anyukov (yellow card) 84'; Azmoun (yellow card) 90+7'	Stadium: Krasnodar Stadium; Attendance: 34,382; Referee: Sergei Karasev

24 April 2019 25	Akhmat Grozny	1 – 1	Krasnodar	Grozny
19:00 MSK (UTC+3)	Semyonov 2'; Shvets (yellow card) 63'	Report	Gazinsky (yellow card) 24'; Claesson 49' (pen.); Ignatyev (yellow card) 63'; Kaboré (yellow card) 68'; Martynovich (yellow card) 71' (yellow-red card) 90+4'	Stadium: Akhmat-Arena; Attendance: 11,997; Referee: Aleksei Eskov

28 April 2019 26	Krasnodar	2 – 0	CSKA Moscow	Krasnodar
19:00 MSK (UTC+3)	Utkin 7'; Ignatyev (yellow card) 34'; Kaboré (yellow card) 41'; Pereyra (yellow card) 44'; Stotsky 55'	Report	Oblyakov (yellow card) 25'; Vlašić (yellow card) 45+2' (yellow-red card) 88'	Stadium: Krasnodar Stadium; Attendance: 33,517; Referee: Sergey Ivanov

5 May 2019 27	Rostov	1 – 1	Krasnodar	Rostov-on-Don
19:00 MSK (UTC+3)	Novoseltsev (yellow card) 24'; Glebov (yellow card) 67'; Hadžikadunić (yellow card) 85'; Shomurodov 89'; Parshivlyuk (yellow card) 90+1'	Report	Claesson 25' (pen.); Gazinsky (yellow card) 72'	Stadium: Rostov Arena; Attendance: 34,044; Referee: Vasiliy Kazartsev

11 May 2019 28	Yenisey Krasnoyarsk	0 – 4	Krasnodar	Krasnoyarsk
14:00 MSK (UTC+3)	Khubulov (yellow card) 75'	Report	Claesson 31'; Gazinsky 36'; Pereyra (yellow card) 51'; Ignatyev 78'; Suleymanov 87'	Stadium: Central Stadium; Attendance: 10,409; Referee: Aleksei Matyunin

19 May 2019 29	Arsenal Tula	0 – 3	Krasnodar	Tula
16:30 MSK (UTC+3)	Kostadinov (yellow card) 67'	Report	Petrov 55'; Kaboré (yellow card) 59'; Spajić (yellow card) 60'; Pereyra 68'; Safonov (yellow card) 76'; Ari 82'	Stadium: Arsenal Stadium; Attendance: 14,470; Referee: Vitali Meshkov

26 May 2019 30	Krasnodar	1 – 0	Rubin Kazan	Krasnodar
14:00 MSK (UTC+3)	Gazinsky (yellow card) 57'; Claesson 59'; Ari (yellow card) 67'	Report	Bayramyan (yellow card) 40'; Stepanov (yellow card) 45+2'; Uremović (yellow card) 85'	Stadium: Krasnodar Stadium; Attendance: 34,897; Referee: Vladimir Moskalyov

==== League table ====
Pos	Team	Pld	W	D	L	GF	GA	GD	Pts	Qualification or relegation
1	Zenit Saint Petersburg (C)	30	20	4	6	57	29	+28	64	Qualification for the Champions League group stage
2	Lokomotiv Moscow	30	16	8	6	45	28	+17	56 (Note: Head-to-head away goals: Lokomotiv 1, Krasnodar 0.)	Qualification for the Champions League group stage
3	Krasnodar	30	16	8	6	55	23	+32	56	Qualification for the Champions League third qualifying round
4	CSKA Moscow	30	14	9	7	46	23	+23	51	Qualification for the Europa League group stage (Note: Lokomotiv Moscow won the 2018–19 Russian Cup. As they already qualified for the Champions League, the Europa League group stage spot (originally designated for the Cup winner) goes to the fourth-placed team, third qualifying round spot goes to fifth-placed team and second qualifying round spot goes to sixth-placed team.)
5	Spartak Moscow	30	14	7	9	36	31	+5	49	Qualification for the Europa League third qualifying round

Updated to match(es) played on 26 May 2019. Source: Russian Premier League, Soccerway
Rules for classification: 1) Points; 2) Head-to-head points; 3) Head-to-head matches won; 4) Head-to-head goal difference; 5) Head-to-head goals scored; 6) Head-to-head away goals; 7) Matches won; 8) Goal difference; 9) Goals scored; 10) Away goals scored; 11) Play-off.
(C) Champions

=== Russian Cup ===
27 September 2018 Round of 32	Avangard Kursk	0 – 2	Krasnodar	Kursk
17:00 MSK (UTC+3)	Troshechkin (yellow card) 48'; Bagayev (yellow card) 90+1'	Report	Markov 9'; Shishkin 65'; Katrich (yellow card) 83'	Stadium: Trudovye Rezervy Stadium; Attendance: 6,500; Referee: Stanislav Vasilyev

1 November 2018 Round of 16	Krylia Sovetov	1 – 2 (a.e.t.)	Krasnodar	Samara
18:00 MSK (UTC+3)	Sobolev (yellow card) 40' (goal) 54'; Mijailović (yellow card) 44'	Report	Stotsky (yellow card) 47'; Spajić (yellow card) 68'; Claesson 76'; Ignatyev 111'	Stadium: Samara Arena; Attendance: 11,093; Referee: Vasily Kazartsev

5 December 2018 Quarterfinal 1st leg	Krasnodar	2 – 2	Rostov	Krasnodar
19:30 MSK (UTC+3)	Ignatyev 17'; Cueva 31'	Report	Skopintsev 40'; Zuyev (yellow card) 56'; Majer (yellow card) 57'; Gațcan 89'	Stadium: Krasnodar Stadium; Attendance: 15,428; Referee: Evgeny Turbin

24 February 2019 Quarterfinal 2nd leg	Rostov	1 – 0	Krasnodar	Rostov-on-Don
19:00 MSK (UTC+3)	Zuyev (yellow card) 29'; Shomurodov (yellow card) 62'; Popov (yellow card) 83' (goal) 87'; Pesyakov (yellow card) 90+3'	Report	Gazinsky (yellow card) 39'; Spajić (yellow card) 48'; Ramírez (yellow card) 59'; Kaboré (yellow card) 64'	Stadium: Rostov Arena; Referee: Vladimir Moskalyov

=== UEFA Europa League ===
==== Group stage ====
Pos	Team	Pld	W	D	L	GF	GA	GD	Pts	Qualification
1	(Spain) Sevilla	6	4	0	2	18	6	+12	12 (Note: Head-to-head goal difference: Sevilla +2, Krasnodar –2.)	Advance to knockout phase
2	(Russia) Krasnodar	6	4	0	2	8	8	0	12	Advance to knockout phase
3	(Belgium) Standard Liège	6	3	1	2	7	9	−2	10	
4	(Turkey) Akhisarspor	6	0	1	5	4	14	−10	1	

Source: UEFA
Rules for classification: Group stage tiebreakers
Notes:

20 September 2018 1	Akhisarspor (Turkey)	0 – 1	(Russia) Krasnodar	Akhisar, Turkey
19:55 MSK (UTC+3)	Seleznyov (yellow card) 11'	Report	Claesson 26'; Kaboré (yellow card) 37'; Martynovich (yellow card) 81'	Stadium: Spor Toto Akhisar Stadium; Attendance: 6,555; Referee: Ville Nevalainen (Finland)

4 October 2018 2	Krasnodar (Russia)	2 – 1	(Spain) Sevilla	Krasnodar, Russia
22:00 MSK (UTC+3)	Pereyra 72' Okriashvili 88'	Report	Kaboré 43' (o.g.)	Stadium: Krasnodar Stadium; Attendance: 31,346; Referee: Martin Strömbergsson (Sweden)

25 October 2018 3	Standard Liège (Belgium)	2 – 1	(Russia) Krasnodar	Liège, Belgium
22:00 MSK (UTC+3)	Emond 47'; Laifis (yellow card) 50' (goal) 90+3'	Report	Ari 39'; Gazinsky (yellow card) 90+5'	Stadium: Stade Maurice Dufrasne; Attendance: 8,393; Referee: Manuel Schüttengruber (Austria)

8 November 2018 4	Krasnodar (Russia)	2 – 1	(Belgium) Standard Liège	Krasnodar, Russia
20:55 MSK (UTC+3)	Martynovich (yellow card) 14'; Pereyra (yellow card) 57'; Kaboré (yellow card) 72'; Gazinsky (yellow card) 73'; Suleymanov 79'; Wanderson 82' (yellow card) 83'	Report	Carcela 19'; Emond (yellow card) 90+4'	Stadium: Krasnodar Stadium; Attendance: 21,526; Referee: Aleksandar Stavrev (Macedonia)

29 November 2018 5	Krasnodar (Russia)	2 – 1	(Turkey) Akhisarspor	Krasnodar, Russia
20:55 MSK (UTC+3)	Stotsky (yellow card) 19'; Ari (yellow card) 36' (goal) 57'; Gazinsky 49'	Report	Serginho 24' (yellow card) 67'; Sissoko (yellow card) 40'; Vural (yellow card) 90+1'	Stadium: Krasnodar Stadium; Attendance: 11,008; Referee: Ivaylo Stoyanov (Bulgaria)

13 December 2018 6	Sevilla (Spain)	3 – 0	(Russia) Krasnodar	Seville, Spain
20:55 MSK (UTC+3)	Ben Yedder 5', 10'; Promes (yellow card) 40'; Banega 49' (pen.) (yellow card) 65'	Report	Gazinsky (yellow card) 14'; Ramírez (yellow card) 40' (yellow-red card) 48'	Stadium: Ramón Sánchez Pizjuán; Attendance: 34,114; Referee: Daniel Stefański (Poland)

==== Knockout phase ====
14 February 2019 Round of 32 1st Leg	Krasnodar (Russia)	0 – 0	(Germany) Bayer 04 Leverkusen	Krasnodar, Russia
20:55 MSK (UTC+3)	Pereyra (yellow card) 74'; Suleymanov (yellow card) 79'	Report		Stadium: Krasnodar Stadium; Attendance: 34,827; Referee: Davide Massa (Italy)

21 February 2019 Round of 32 2nd Leg	Bayer 04 Leverkusen (Germany)	1 – 1 (1 – 1 agg.)	(Russia) Krasnodar	Leverkusen, Germany
23:00 MSK (UTC+3)	Dragović (yellow card) 42'; Aránguiz 87'	Report	Olsson (yellow card) 37'; Pereyra (yellow card) 81'; Suleymanov 84'; Stotsky (yellow card) 90+3'	Stadium: BayArena; Attendance: 16,084; Referee: Gediminas Mažeika (Lithuania)

7 March 2019 Round of 16 1st Leg	Valencia (Spain)	2 – 1	(Russia) Krasnodar	Valencia, Spain
23:00 MSK (UTC+3)	Rodrigo 12', 24'; Parejo (yellow card) 55'; Coquelin (yellow card) 81'	Report	Kaboré (yellow card) 20'; Claesson (yellow card) 45' (goal) 63'; Martynovich (yellow card) 72'; Olsson (yellow card) 80'	Stadium: Mestalla; Attendance: 36,274; Referee: Orel Grinfeld (Israel)

14 March 2019 Round of 16 2nd Leg	Krasnodar (Russia)	1 – 1 (2 – 3 agg.)	(Spain) Valencia	Krasnodar, Russia
20:55 MSK (UTC+3)	Pereyra (yellow card) 29'; Gazinsky (yellow card) 78'; Suleymanov 85'	Report	Kondogbia (yellow card) 15'; Soler (yellow card) 75'; Guedes 90+3' (yellow card) 90+3'; Gameiro (yellow card) 90+4'	Stadium: Krasnodar Stadium; Attendance: 35,074; Referee: Anthony Taylor (England)

== Squad statistics ==
As of match played 26 May 2019

=== Appearances and goals ===
No.	Pos	Nat	Player	Total		Premier League		Russian Cup		UEFA Europa League	
No.	Pos	Nat	Player	Apps	Goals	Apps	Goals	Apps	Goals	Apps	Goals
1	GK	(Russia) RUS	Stanislav Kritsyuk	17	0	12	0	1	0	4	0
3	DF	(Iceland) ISL	Jón Fjóluson	11	0	5+1	0	3	0	2	0
4	DF	(Belarus) BLR	Alyaksandr Martynovich	40	0	28	0	3	0	9	0
5	DF	(Serbia) SRB	Uroš Spajić	39	0	28	0	2	0	9	0
6	DF	(Ecuador) ECU	Cristian Ramírez	35	0	17+6	0	4	0	8	0
7	MF	(Brazil) BRA	Wanderson	42	7	26+4	6	2	0	10	1
8	MF	(Russia) RUS	Yury Gazinsky	41	3	27+1	2	2+2	0	8+1	1
9	FW	(Russia) RUS	Ari	22	10	13+3	8	0	0	5+1	2
11	MF	(Russia) RUS	Dmitri Skopintsev	9	1	5+4	1	0	0	0	0
14	MF	(Sweden) SWE	Kristoffer Olsson	11	0	1+5	0	0+1	0	4	0
15	DF	(Russia) RUS	Nikolay Markov	5	1	3	0	2	1	0	0
16	MF	(Sweden) SWE	Viktor Claesson	42	15	28+1	12	3+1	1	9	2
17	MF	(Russia) RUS	Pavel Mamayev	13	3	8+2	3	1	0	2	0
22	DF	(Russia) RUS	Ivan Taranov	1	0	0	0	0	0	0+1	0
33	MF	(Uruguay) URU	Mauricio Pereyra	38	4	21+5	3	1+2	0	5+4	1
39	GK	(Russia) RUS	Matvei Safonov	21	0	14	0	2	0	5	0
47	DF	(Russia) RUS	Daniil Utkin	9	1	2+5	1	2	0	0	0
50	DF	(Russia) RUS	Artyom Golubev	5	0	0+2	0	0+1	0	0+2	0
77	MF	(Burkina Faso) BFA	Charles Kaboré	37	1	24	1	4	0	9	0
85	FW	(Russia) RUS	Ivan Ignatyev	29	9	13+7	7	3	2	3+3	0
88	GK	(Russia) RUS	Andrei Sinitsyn	7	0	4+1	0	1	0	1	0
89	MF	(Russia) RUS	Dmitry Stotsky	37	1	19+6	1	3+1	0	5+3	0
93	FW	(Russia) RUS	Magomed-Shapi Suleymanov	31	11	3+17	8	0+3	0	0+8	3
98	MF	(Russia) RUS	Sergei Petrov	33	1	22	1	1	0	9+1	0
Players away from the club on loan:
11	MF	(Russia) RUS	Ilya Zhigulyov	2	0	1+1	0	0	0	0	0
20	MF	(Peru) PER	Christian Cueva	23	1	3+12	0	2	1	3+3	0
49	DF	(Russia) RUS	Roman Shishkin	6	1	1+2	0	2	1	0+1	0
Players who left Krasnodar during the season:
10	FW	(Russia) RUS	Fyodor Smolov	2	1	2	1	0	0	0	0
23	MF	(Russia) RUS	Anatoli Katrich	1	0	0	0	0+1	0	0	0
70	MF	(Georgia (country)) GEO	Tornike Okriashvili	3	1	0+2	0	0	0	0+1	1

=== Goal scorers ===
Place	Position	Nation	Number	Name	Premier League	Russian Cup	UEFA Europa League	Total
1	MF	(Sweden)	16	Viktor Claesson	12	1	2	15
2	FW	(Russia)	93	Magomed-Shapi Suleymanov	8	0	3	11
3	FW	(Russia)	9	Ari	8	0	2	10
4	FW	(Russia)	85	Ivan Ignatyev	7	2	0	9
5	MF	(Brazil)	7	Wanderson	6	0	1	7
6	MF	(Uruguay)	33	Mauricio Pereyra	3	0	1	4
7	MF	(Russia)	17	Pavel Mamayev	3	0	0	3
7	MF	(Russia)	8	Yury Gazinsky	2	0	1	3
9	FW	(Russia)	10	Fyodor Smolov	1	0	0	1
9	MF	(Burkina Faso)	77	Charles Kaboré	1	0	0	1
9	MF	(Russia)	11	Dmitri Skopintsev	1	0	0	1
9	DF	(Russia)	47	Daniil Utkin	1	0	0	1
9	MF	(Russia)	89	Dmitry Stotsky	1	0	0	1
9	DF	(Russia)	98	Sergei Petrov	1	0	0	1
9	DF	(Russia)	15	Nikolay Markov	0	1	0	1
9	DF	(Russia)	49	Roman Shishkin	0	1	0	1
9	MF	(Peru)	20	Christian Cueva	0	1	0	1
9	MF	(Georgia (country))	70	Tornike Okriashvili	0	0	1	1
				TOTALS	55	6	11	72

=== Disciplinary record ===
Number	Nation	Position	Name	Premier League		Russian Cup		UEFA Europa League		Total	
Number	Nation	Position	Name	Yellow card	Red card	Yellow card	Red card	Yellow card	Red card	Yellow card	Red card
4	(Belarus)	DF	Alyaksandr Martynovich	6	2	0	0	3	0	9	2
5	(Serbia)	DF	Uroš Spajić	9	0	2	0	0	0	11	0
6	(Ecuador)	DF	Cristian Ramírez	4	1	1	0	1	1	6	2
7	(Brazil)	MF	Wanderson	2	0	0	0	1	0	3	0
8	(Russia)	MF	Yury Gazinsky	6	0	1	0	4	0	11	0
9	(Russia)	FW	Ari	3	1	0	0	1	0	4	1
14	(Sweden)	MF	Kristoffer Olsson	0	0	0	0	2	0	2	0
16	(Sweden)	MF	Viktor Claesson	2	0	0	0	1	0	3	0
17	(Russia)	MF	Pavel Mamayev	1	0	0	0	0	0	1	0
33	(Uruguay)	MF	Mauricio Pereyra	6	0	0	0	4	0	10	0
39	(Russia)	GK	Matvei Safonov	1	0	0	0	0	0	1	0
77	(Burkina Faso)	MF	Charles Kaboré	11	2	1	0	3	0	15	2
85	(Russia)	FW	Ivan Ignatyev	2	0	0	0	0	0	2	0
89	(Russia)	MF	Dmitry Stotsky	4	0	1	0	2	0	7	0
93	(Russia)	FW	Magomed-Shapi Suleymanov	4	0	0	0	1	0	5	0
98	(Russia)	MF	Sergei Petrov	3	2	0	0	0	0	3	2
Players away on loan:
20	(Peru)	MF	Christian Cueva	1	0	0	0	0	0	1	0
Players who left Krasnodar during the season:
23	(Russia)	MF	Anatoli Katrich	0	0	1	0	0	0	1	0
			TOTALS	65	8	7	0	23	1	95	9
