= Karina Istomina =

Russian DJ, blogger and model

Karina Smolova
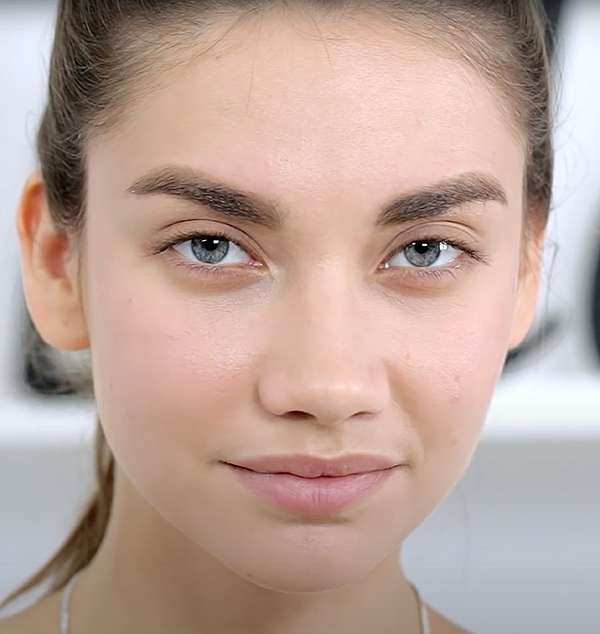
- Istomina in 2015

Background information
- Born: Karina Igorevna Istomina; 20 April 1994 (age 32); Moscow, Russia
- Genres: Funk, disco, new school hip hop, new wave, techno, pop, R&B, house, soul, lofi, EDM
- Occupations: DJ, blogger, YouTuber, podcaster, model (formerly), PR manager (formerly)
- Years active: 2009—2016 (modelling); 2015—present (music); 2019—present (blogging)
- Website: instagram.com/diamond_april/

Karina Igorevna Smolova née Istomina (Russian: Карина Игоревна Смолова (Истомина), born April 20, 1994) is a Russian DJ, blogger, podcaster, leading Instagram influencer, and ex-model.

== Biography ==
Karina Istomina was born in Moscow, Russia. She started her modelling career at the age of 15 and soon moved to New York City. She graduated from Higher School of Economics (Faculty of Media Communications) in 2016. She has also worked as a PR manager for Russian synthpop band Tesla Boy for a year.

As of 2021, Istomina is one of the most famous DJs in Moscow. She was the only Russian music blogger cooperating with Apple Music, for which she prepares exclusive playlists. In December 2019, Karina Istomina and Xenia Dukalis released the album Trendy Snakes (Russian: Подкомодные змеи, Podkomodnye zmei) in the genre of female alternative rap under the label ASC.

From 2019 to 2021 she was a co-host of the Girlfriends (Russian: Подруги, Podrugi) show on the YouTube channel Gentle Editor (Russian: Нежный редактор, Nezhny redaktor) together with Tatiana Mingalimova, Xenia Dukalis and Tatiana Starikova, where they have been discussing feminism, self-esteem, bullying, sex and other topics with experts and guest stars.

In February 2021 Istomina started a new show on TikTok the Musical Thursday (Russian: Музыкальный четверг, Muzykal'ny chetverg). In April 2021 Istomina launched the YouTube project It's easier to Cope (Russian: Справиться проще, Spravitsya proshe), dedicated to mental health problems.

In March 2022 Russia moved to block access to Instagram and thereby a major source of income for influencers including Istomina. She reacted saying, "To be honest with you, I am absolutely devastated that I am losing my page. I ran my profile for over 10 years. Most likely I will have to find new sources of income, will have to rediscover myself."

Karina Istomina on the show "THERE IS A THEME" (Russian: "ЕСТЬ ТЕМА")

== Personal life ==
In 2021 Istomina publicly announced her drug addiction, craving for self-harm and mental problems.

In June 2023 Istomina married a striker for Dynamo Moscow and the Russian national football team Fyodor Smolov. On the 15th of November of the same year the couple had a daughter named Laura.

== Filmography ==
- 2021 — Happy End as a DJ (cameo)
