= Yuvan Shestalov =

Yuvan Nikolayevich Shestalov (Russian: Юван Николаевич Шесталов; 1937–2011) was a Mansi writer from Russia.

== Life and work ==
Shestalov was born 22 June 1937 in Kamratka village, Beryozovsky District, Khanty-Mansi Autonomous Okrug.

Shestalov is arguably the best known author in the Mansi language although he mostly wrote in Russian. His work in Mansi and Russian has been widely translated and he worked actively to preserve his native language and culture. He also became a laureate of several Soviet and Russian literary prizes.

The first poetic book by Yu. Shestalov in the Mansi language "Makem At" ("Breath of the Earth") was published in 1958 in Tyumen. The first really successful work was "The Pagan Poem" (1971), in which the author tried to translate into the language of poetry the ritual culture of his people with its actions and multi-layered spiritual content.

After the breakup of the Soviet Union in 1991, he converted to Russian Orthodox.

Shestalov died on 5 November 2011, aged 75.
