= Muzhi =

Muzhi (Russian: Мужи) is the name of several rural localities in Russia:

- Muzhi, Pskov Oblast, a village in Pytalovsky District of Pskov Oblast
- Muzhi, Yamalo-Nenets Autonomous Okrug, a selo in Shuryshkarsky District of Yamalo-Nenets Autonomous Okrug
