= Yamal to Its Descendants =

Yamal to Its Descendants is an Indigenous organisation of the Nenets people, a Samoyedic group of the Yamalo-Nenets Autonomous Okrug of northern Russia. It was formally founded in 1989 as «Ямал-потомкам» ("Yamal-Detail"), but since 1953, the organisation's precursors have published a newspaper, Nyaryana ngerm ("The Red North") with articles in Nenets language and separate articles in Russian, covering issues pertinent to the Indigenous peoples of the region.
